= History of the University of Mississippi =

History of a US university

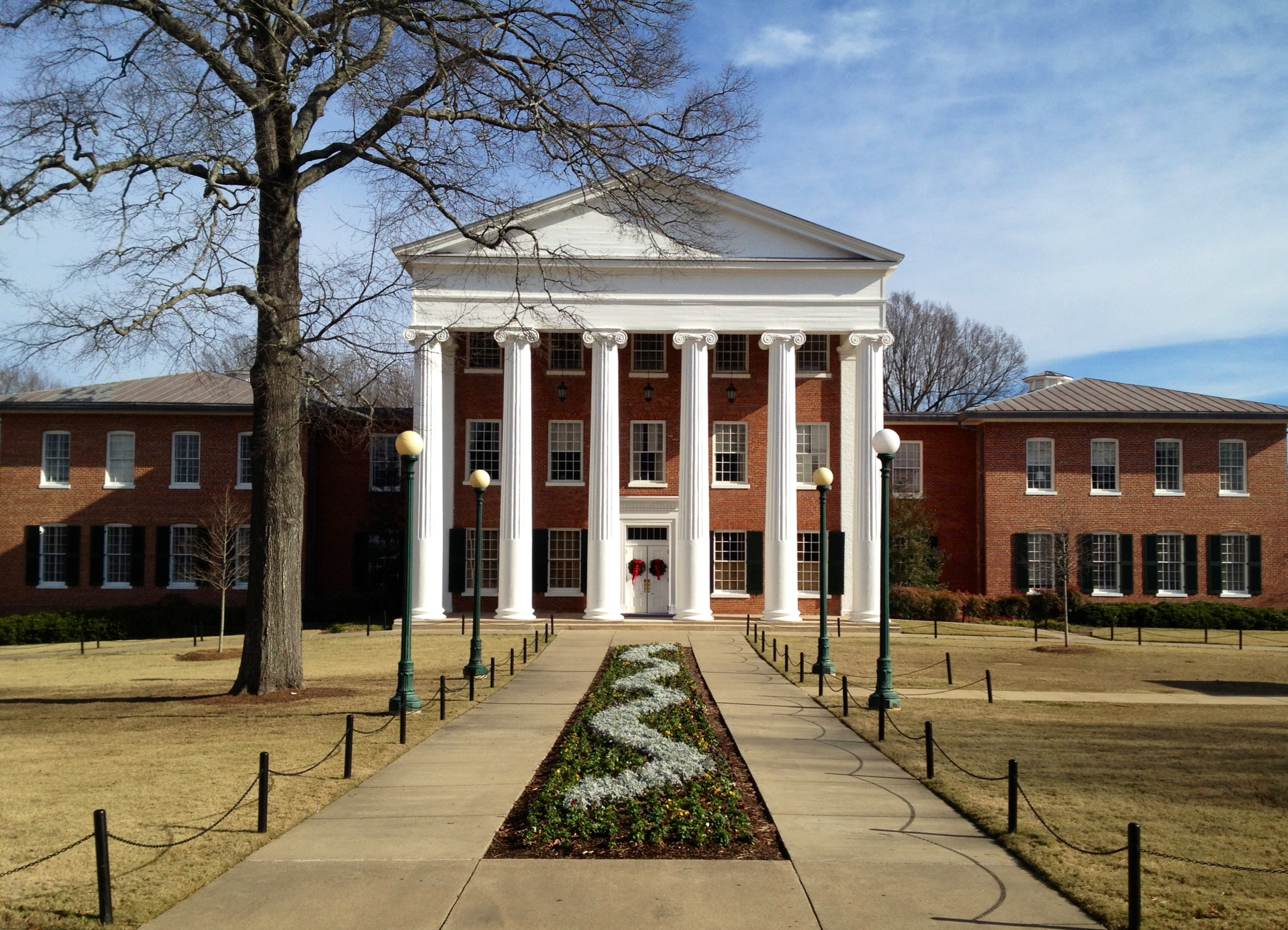
The Lyceum, William Nichols, architect (1848)

The history of the University of Mississippi, the first public institution of higher education in Mississippi, began in 1848, when the Mississippi Legislature chartered the university. Construction of the university was completed in the rural town of Oxford in 1848.

== Founding and early history ==
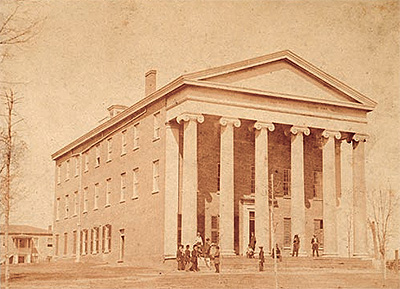
The Lyceum, pictured in 1861

The Mississippi Legislature chartered the University of Mississippi on February 24, 1848. Its isolated rural site in the town of Oxford was selected as it was a "sylvan exile" that would encourage academic studies. In 1845, residents of Lafayette County donated land west of Oxford for the campus, and, the following year, William Nichols oversaw construction of the Lyceum, two dormitories, and faculty residences. On November 6, 1848, the university—offering a classical curriculum—opened its doors to its first class of 80 students. All but one were from Mississippi. For 23 years, the university was Mississippi's only public institution of higher learning, and for 110 years it was the state's only comprehensive university. In 1854, the university established the fourth state-supported, public law school in the United States, and also began offering engineering education.

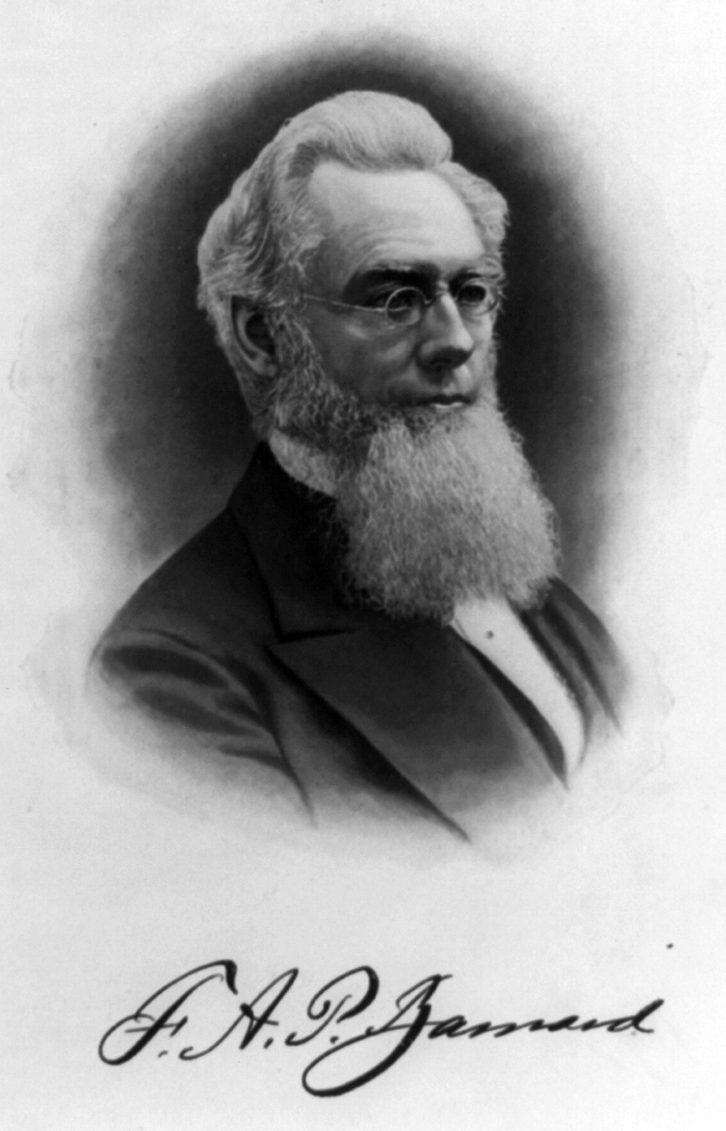
Frederick A. P. Barnard was the last antebellum head of the university.

Early president Frederick A. P. Barnard sought to increase the stature of the university, placing him in conflict with the trustees. His hundred-page 1858 report to the trustees on his proposals resulted in little besides the university head's title being changed to "chancellor". Barnard's northern background—he was born in Massachusetts and graduated from Yale—and Union sympathies resulted in heightened tensions: a student assaulted his slave and the state legislature investigated him. Following the presidential election of Abraham Lincoln in 1860, Mississippi became the second state to secede, with the articles of secession drafted by the university's mathematics professor Lucius Quintus Cincinnatus Lamar. Students organized themselves into a military company called the "University Greys", which merged with the Confederate States Army. Within a month of the Civil War's outbreak, only five students remained at the university, and, by fall 1861, the university closed. In its final action, the board of trustees awarded Barnard a doctorate of divinity.

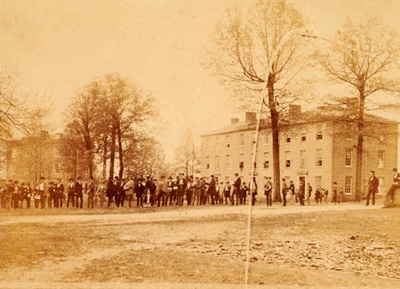
Class of 1861

Within six months, the campus was converted into a hospital for Confederate wounded. It was evacuated in November 1862 as general Ulysses S. Grant's Union forces approached. Although Kansas troops destroyed much of the medical equipment, a lone remaining professor persuaded Grant against burning the campus. After three weeks, Grant and his forces left, and the campus returned to being a Confederate hospital. Throughout the war, over 700 wounded died and were buried on campus.

== Post-Civil War ==
The University of Mississippi reopened in October 1865. During the post-war period, the university was led by former Confederate general A.P. Stewart, a Rogersville, Tennessee native. He served as Chancellor from 1874 to 1886. To avoid rejecting veterans, the university lowered admission standards and decreased cost by eliminating tuition and allowing students to live off-campus and prepare their own meals. The university became coeducational in 1882; however, women could not live on campus or attend the university's law school. In 1885, the University of Mississippi became the first college in the Southeast to hire a female faculty member, Sarah McGehee Isom. Nearly 100 years later, the Sarah Isom Center for Women's Studies was established in her honor.

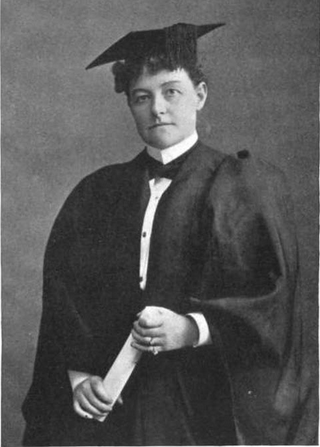
The University of Mississippi was the first college in the Southeast to hire a female faculty member: Sarah McGehee Isom in 1885.

The nickname "Ole Miss" dates to 1897, when the student yearbook was first published. A contest was held to solicit suggestions for a yearbook title from the student body, and Elma Meek submitted the winning entry. Interviewed by the student newspaper, The Mississippian, in 1939, Meek stated: "I had often heard old 'darkies' on Southern plantations address the lady in the 'big house' as 'Ole Miss'... the name appealed to me, so I suggested it to the committee and they adopted it." Some historians concur that she derived the term from "ol' missus," an African-American term for a plantation's "old mistress". Alternative theories include that the nickname originated from a diminutive of "old Mississippi", or, less likely, the "Ole Miss" train that ran from Memphis to New Orleans. This sobriquet was not only chosen for the yearbook, but also became the name by which the university was informally known.

The university began medical education in 1903, when the University of Mississippi School of Medicine was established on the Oxford campus. In that era, the university provided two-year pre-clinical education certificates, and graduates went out of state to complete doctor of medicine degrees. In 1950, the Mississippi Legislature voted to create a four-year medical school. On July 1, 1955, the University Medical Center opened in the capital of Jackson, Mississippi, as a four-year medical school. The University of Mississippi Medical Center, as it is now called, is the health sciences campus of the University of Mississippi.

The Mississippi Legislature between 1900 and 1930 introduced several bills aiming to relocate or otherwise close the University of Mississippi. Some attempts tried to merge the university with Mississippi A&M, now Mississippi State University. All such legislation failed. During the 1930s, Mississippi Governor Theodore G. Bilbo was politically hostile towards the university, firing administrators and faculty and replacing them with his friends. Bilbo's actions damaged the university to such a degree that it lost its accreditation. He also tried to move the university to Jackson. Chancellor Alfred Hume gave the state legislators a grand tour of Ole Miss and the surrounding historic city of Oxford, persuading them to keep it in its original setting. In a move to prevent future political interference, in 1944 the Mississippi Constitution was amended to create a board of trustees insulated from political pressure.

During World War II, UM was one of 131 colleges and universities nationally that took part in the V-12 Navy College Training Program, which offered students a path to a Navy commission.

== Integration ==
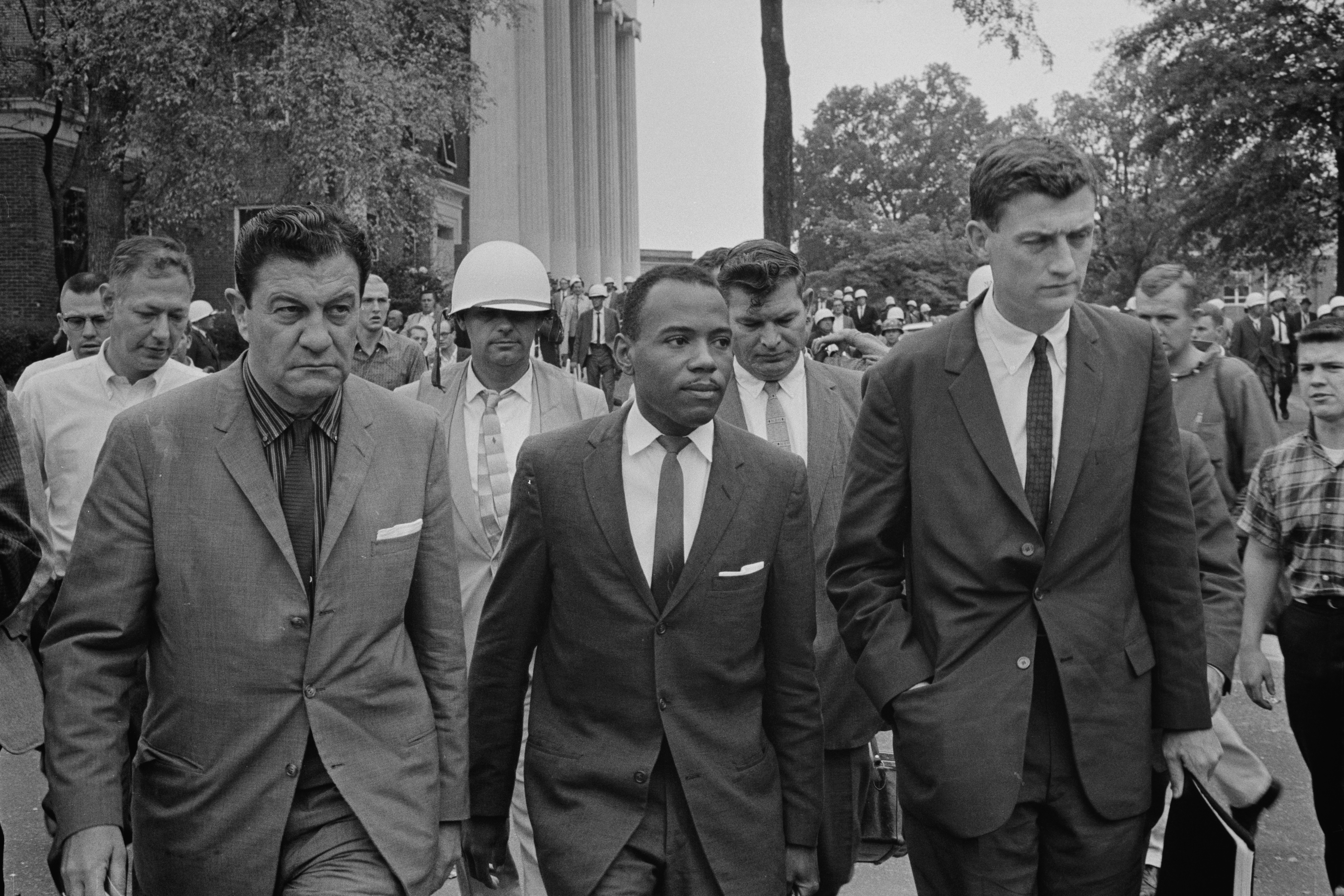
James Meredith accompanied by federal officials

In 1954, the U.S. Supreme Court ruled in Brown v. Board of Education that segregation in public schools was unconstitutional. Eight years after the Brown decision, every Mississippi school district remained segregated, and all attempts by African American applicants to integrate the university had failed. Shortly after the 1961 inauguration of President John F. Kennedy, James Meredith—an African American who had served in the Air Force and completed coursework at Jackson State University—applied to Ole Miss. After Meredith's admission was obstructed for months by Mississippi officials, the U.S. Supreme Court ordered his enrollment and the Department of Justice, under Attorney General Robert F. Kennedy's orders, entered the case on Meredith's behalf. On three occasions, Meredith was physically blocked from enrolling by governor Ross R. Barnett or lieutenant governor Paul B. Johnson Jr.

After the United States Court of Appeals for the Fifth Circuit held both Barnett and Lieutenant Governor Paul B. Johnson, Jr. in contempt, with fines of more than $10,000 for each day they refused to allow Meredith to enroll, President John F. Kennedy dispatched 127 U.S. Marshals, 316 deputized U.S. Border Patrol agents, and 97 federalized Federal Bureau of Prisons personnel to escort Meredith to the campus on September 30, 1962. Two civilians were killed by gunfire during the riot, French journalist Paul Guihard and Oxford repairman Ray Gunter. Eventually, 3,000 United States Army and federalized Mississippi National Guard troops quickly arrived in Oxford that helped quell the riot and brought the situation under control. One-third of the federal officers, 166 men, were injured, as were 40 federal soldiers and National Guardsmen. The strength of all forces deployed, alerted, and committed in Oxford was around 30,656—the largest for a single disturbance in American history.

After control was re-established by federal-led forces, Meredith was able to enroll and attend his first class on October 1. Following the riot, Army and National Guard troops were stationed in Oxford to prevent future similar violence. While most Ole Miss students did not riot prior to his enrollment in the university, many harassed Meredith during his first two semesters on campus. He persisted through harassment and extreme isolation to graduate on August 18, 1963, with a degree in political science.

In the next two years, additional African-American students enrolled at the university. In early June 1963, Cleve McDowell enrolled in the law school and became the second black student to attend the University. He was Meredith's roommate. After Meredith finished classes in July, the federal marshals left campus. McDowell was concerned for his safety, and asked for permission to carry a concealed weapon, but it was denied. He carried one anyway, and when it was discovered, he was expelled. He completed his law degree and became a civil rights lawyer and public defender in Mississippi. McDowell was shot and killed in 1997; a 19-year-old client was charged in his death.

Cleveland Donald Jr. enrolled at the University in 1964, under a federal protection order. He graduated with a history degree in 1966, becoming the second black graduate. After serving as a professor at other universities, in 1978 he returned to help establish a black studies program at the University of Mississippi.

== Recent history ==
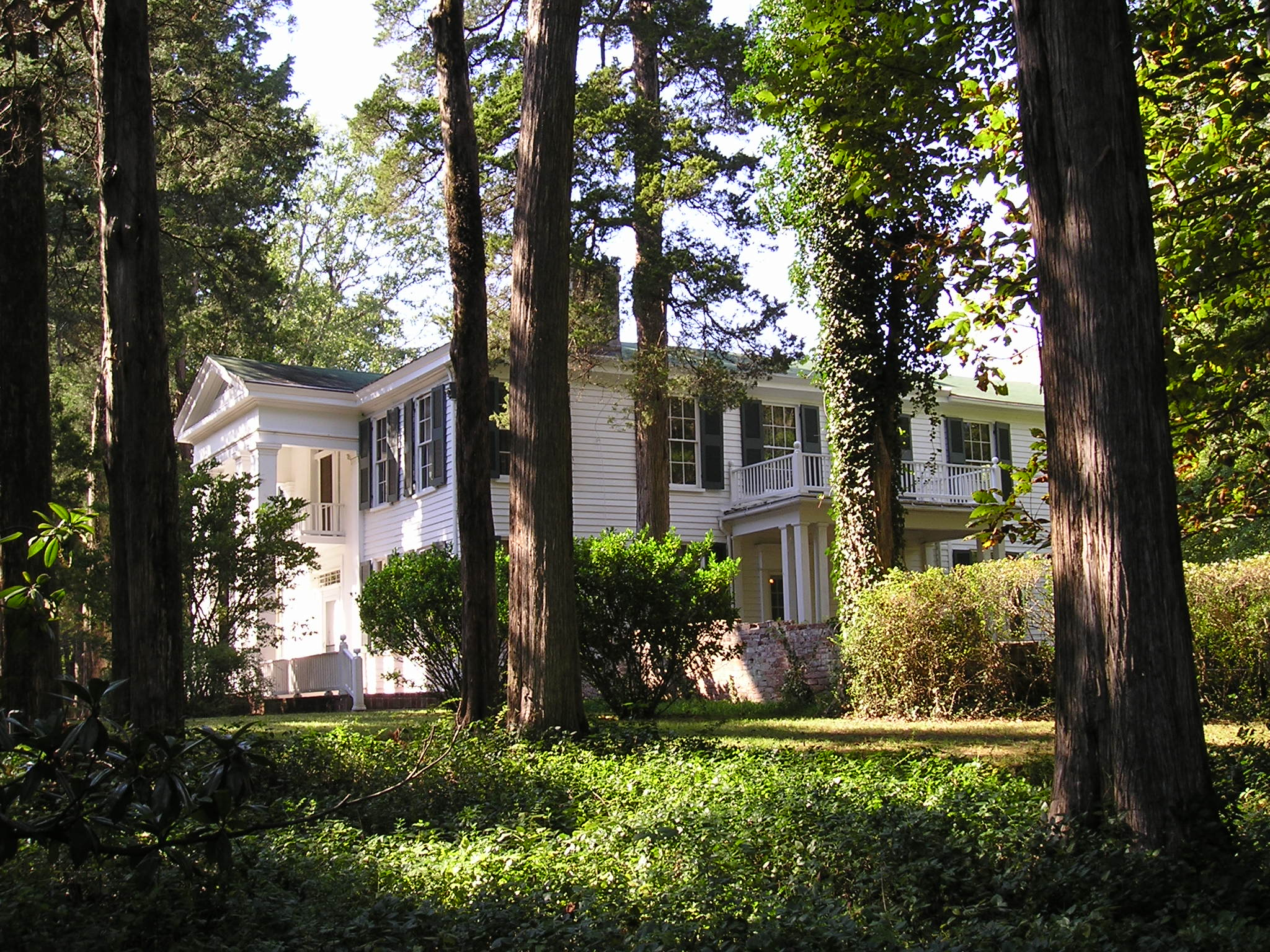
The university owns Rowan Oak, former home of Nobel Prize-winning writer William Faulkner.

In 1972, the university purchased Rowan Oak, the former home of Nobel Prize-winning writer William Faulkner. The home is preserved as it was at the time of Faulkner's 1962 death. Faulkner worked as the university's postmaster in the early 1920s and wrote As I Lay Dying at the university powerhouse. His Nobel Prize medallion is displayed in the university library. Fostering Faulkner's legacy, the university hosted the inaugural Faulkner and Yoknapatawpha Conference in 1974. Six years later, in 1980, Willie Morris became the university's first writer in residence.

In 2002, the university marked the 40th anniversary of integration with a yearlong series of events titled "Open Doors: Building on 40 Years of Opportunity in Higher Education." These included an oral history of Ole Miss, various symposiums, the April unveiling of a $130,000 memorial, and a reunion of federal marshals who had served at the campus. In September 2003, the university completed the year's events with an international conference on race. By that year, 13% of the student body identified as African American. Meredith's son Joseph graduated as the top doctoral student at the School of Business Administration. Six years later, in 2008, the site of the riots was designated as a National Historic Landmark. From September 2012 to May 2013, the university marked its 50th anniversary of integration with a program called Opening the Closed Society.

The university was chosen to host the first presidential debate of 2008, between Senators John McCain and Barack Obama. It was the first presidential debate held in Mississippi.

In 2003, the university retired its mascot, Colonel Reb, due to Confederate imagery. Although a grass-roots movement to adopt Star Wars character Admiral Ackbar (of the Rebel Alliance) gained significant traction, Rebel Black Bear was selected as the new mascot in 2010. This mascot was replaced with another mascot, Tony the Landshark, in 2017. In 2015, "Students Against Social Injustice" (SASI) started a movement to remove Confederate iconography from the campus, such as the Mississippi State Flag (which at that time showed the Confederate flag). In 2018, SASI asked that the Confederate Monument located at The Center be removed from campus. In 2019, during Black History Month, student activists marched twice to support moving the monument. In March 2019, the Faculty Senate, Graduate Student Council, and the Associated Student Body voted to relocate the monument, and in June 2020, the university relocated the Confederate Monument to the University Cemetery.
