= Bud Light Daredevils =

American acrobatic basketball show

The Bud Light Daredevils, formerly the Dixie Daredevils, were an American acrobatic basketball show that performed during the halftime of college and NBA basketball games from 1983 to 1998. The show combined gymnastics, trampoline, acrobatics, and basketball. The team was started by University of Mississippi cheerleaders Ty Cobb, Sam Martin, Jeff Hubbard, John White, and Ty Cobb's younger brother Guy Cobb.

== Ole Miss and the Inception of Acrobatic Basketball (1979–83) ==
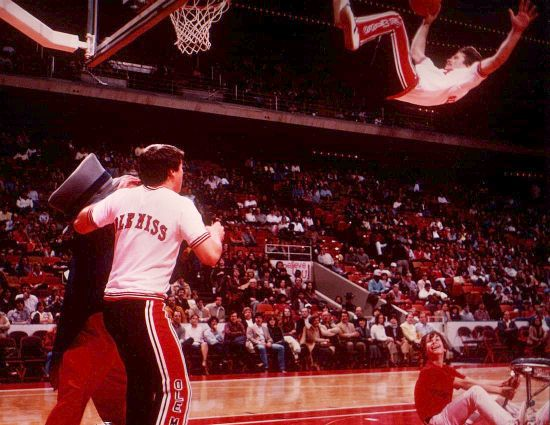
Ole Miss cheerleaders (including Colonel Reb) performing as the halftime entertainment during a Houston Rockets game

In 1980, Ty Cobb, along with fellow cheerleaders Sam Martin, John White, and Jeff Hubbard (as Ole Miss Rebels mascot Colonel Reb) began performing ball handling skits and acrobatics which incorporated a mini-trampoline during the time-outs and half-time of Ole Miss basketball games. Using his previous trampoline and diving skills and the cheerleader's mini-trampoline, Ty Cobb, on a dare performed the first successful acrobatic "flip dunk" at the Ole Miss vs. Alabama basketball game in 1980 and received a standing ovation by Alabama fans. Ole Miss Head Basketball Coach Bob Weltlich, recognizing the group's potential to soften up an opposing team's crowd, began flying the foursome with the Ole Miss Basketball team to away games.

In 1980, Ty Cobb's fraternity brother and fellow Ole Miss cheerleader Walt Shinault was practicing stunts using a mini-trampoline in the yard of his apartment complex in Oxford when he fell and broke his neck. The fall left him a quadriplegic. After the accident the Southeastern Conference (SEC) banned the use of mini-trampolines by all cheerleaders at SEC games.

With the banning of the use of mini-trampolines by cheerleaders throughout the SEC, Ty Cobb began looking for other ways for the group to continue performing their developing halftime show. Working on a marketing class project which had asked that students create their own company, Ty Cobb created a company called "The Ole Miss Cheerleaders Half Time Show". He designed marketing brochures and advertising materials that he then sent to National Basketball Association (NBA) promotional directors as part of a direct marketing campaign. The concept worked as the promotional directors at many of the NBA teams were looking for new ways to increase attendance and contacted Ty to schedule the "Ole Miss Cheerleaders" to perform during the time outs and halftime of their home games. The first professional NBA performance by The Ole Miss Cheerleaders was for the San Antonio Spurs in 1980, followed by shows for the Houston Rockets and Dallas Mavericks.

Still in high school in 1981, Ty Cobb's younger brother Guy Cobb joined the show for performances at NBA games. With the addition of Guy, the team began experimenting with different ways to acrobatically pass the basketball. These passes were mixed and matched with each other to not only allow for more complex acrobatic dunks to be performed but also to provide a way for the team to incorporate more passes into the dunk sequences without having to stop the show. One example was the "flip-pass" off the basketball backboard. This pass could be followed by another flip-pass and another and then a dunk ("Congo Dunk" 1987).

== The Dixie Daredevils (1983–84) ==
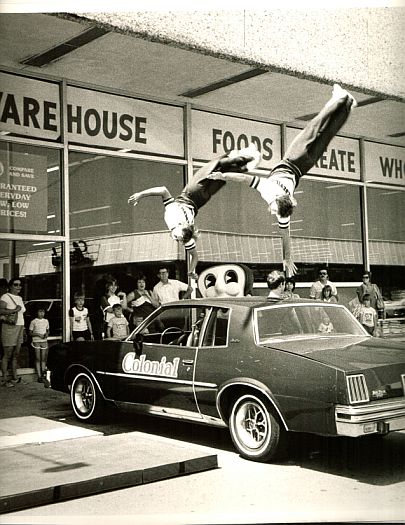
Brothers Ty and Guy Cobb performing with Steve Cliffe as "The Dixie Daredevils" in a grocery store parking lot (Summer 1983).

Following his graduation from Ole Miss in the Fall of 1983, Ty Cobb began planning to create a professional half-time show that would travel and perform during the college and NBA basketball season. Guy Cobb, having just completed his freshman year at Ole Miss, dropped out of school to join his brother.

In 1983 Cobb's father became President of Colonial Baking Company in St. Louis. The two Cobb brothers relocated with their parents to the small community of Columbia, Illinois located southeast of St. Louis. They set up an office in their parent's basement and began organizing a performance schedule for the 1983-84 basketball season. Charles Cobb came up with the team's new professional name of "Dixie Daredevils". Steve Cliffe, a former Mehlville High School school mate of Ty Cobb's also joined the Dixie Daredevils at this time.

In the Summer of 1983, Cobb's father scheduled the Dixie Daredevils as a Colonial Bread promotion. He sponsored the Dixie Daredevils for performances in grocery store parking lots and at high school assemblies throughout the metro St. Louis and central Illinois areas.

During the 1983-84 basketball season, Ty and Guy Cobb performed 45 shows throughout the United States. At the end of the season they received a call from Anheuser-Busch to discuss a sponsorship of the Dixie Daredevils to be associated with a new beer called "Budweiser Light".

== The Bud Light Daredevils (1984–1998) ==
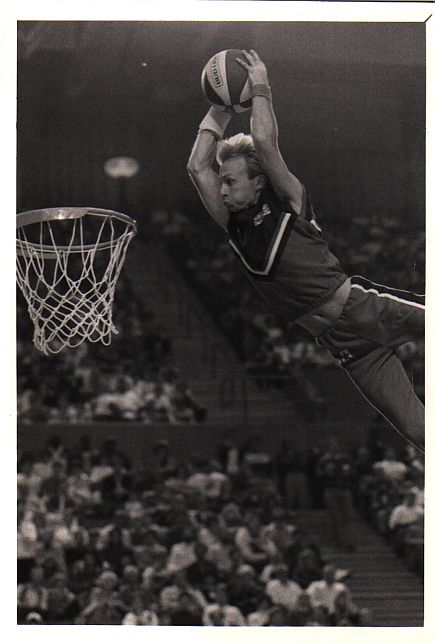
Guy Cobb performing with the Bud Light Daredevils in 1987.

Both Cobb brothers worked for Universal Cheerleaders Association (UCA) during the Summer of 1982 as cheerleading instructors. Ty Cobb had met Mack Hirshberg at UCA's college cheerleading camp the previous Summer. Hirshberg was a cheerleader at the University of South Carolina and had just graduated. In the Summer of 1983 Anheuser-Busch changed the name of their new beer "Budweiser Light" to "Bud Light". Mack Hirshberg joined the group for the 1984-85 premiere season and the team's name was changed from The Dixie Daredevils to The Bud Light Daredevils.

It started in 1979 when Jeff Hubbard, who was a mascot at the University of Mississippi, dared fellow cheerleader Ty Cobb, who is related to the baseball legend, to do a flip off a minitrampoline and slam dunk a basketball through the hoop. Cobb did it and delighted an astonished crowd. Cobb then recruited several other cheerleaders and created a short routine of precision gymnastics and ball handling that was performed throughout the NCAA's Southeastern Conference.

The cheerleaders turned professional during the 1980–81 season and took their act on the road. In 1983, the team was known as the Dixie Daredevils, and Cobb approached Anheuser-Busch Inc. about sponsoring the team.

From 1984 to 1998 the Bud Light Daredevils performed at universities and NBA games throughout all 50 United States. When they were not performing during the American basketball season, they found sponsors for tours of the Netherlands, Belgium, Great Britain, Spain, Japan, China, Norway, South America, Australia, Israel, and Puerto Rico. Corporate sponsors included Boeing, Converse, Wang Laboratories, SportLife Chewing Gum, and Gordon's Gin. The group was also featured on national television shows such as ABC's That's Incredible!, Incredible Sunday, Showtime's Super Dave (TV series), Disney's The Mickey Mouse Club, and most recently, former Bud Light Daredevil Mark Odgers was featured performing a flip dunk over a New York City Cab live on Late Night with David Letterman.

During the 1996–97 season, the Bud Light Daredevils have three teams touring full time. One team only performs internationally. The other two teams perform at approximately 150 events in front of more than 1 million fans.

Anheuser-Busch ended their fourteen-year sponsorship of the Bud Light Daredevils in 1998 in response to both governmental and social pressure to eliminate all alcohol marketing to college students.

The team has performed in front of more than 8 million people at 385 colleges and tournaments, 26 NBA teams, 28 CBA teams. They have taken the show to 74 cities in 20 foreign countries. Video highlights of their performances have been shown on such TV shows as "America's Funniest Home Videos", "NBC Nightly News", "The Tonight Show", "Late Night with David Letterman", "Good Morning America", "George Michaels Sports Machine" and "The Today Show." A 30-minute special about the team titled "The Right Stuff" aired on ESPN.

== See also ==
- Slamball
- Ole Miss
- University of Mississippi
- Guy Cobb
