= Cleve McDowell =

American civil rights activist and lawyer (1941–1997)

- McDowell on the campus of the University of Mississippi in 1963
- Born: August 6, 1941; Drew, Mississippi, United States
- Died: March 13, 1997 (aged 55); Drew, Mississippi, United States
- Education: University of Mississippi School of Law (expelled)
- Alma mater: Jackson State College; Texas Southern University (JD)
- Occupations: Field secretary for the NAACP; Lawyer
- Known for: First African American to enroll in the University of Mississippi School of Law

Cleve McDowell (August 6, 1941 – March 13, 1997) was an American civil rights activist and lawyer. He is most well known for being the first African American to enroll in the University of Mississippi School of Law.

McDowell was born in 1941 in Drew, Mississippi, to an African American tenant farmer. He attended Jackson State College for his undergraduate studies and graduated in 1963. In June of that year, he enrolled in the University of Mississippi School of Law. While his application had initially been rejected, a court order from federal judge Sidney Carr Mize forced the university to accept him as their first African American student. He was also the second African American student to enroll in the university overall after fellow Jackson State alumnus James Meredith, who had enrolled the previous year. However, several months after enrolling, he was expelled from the university for carrying a handgun on campus.

Following his expulsion from the University of Mississippi, McDowell studied at Texas Southern University, where he earned his Juris Doctor. After this, he practiced law in Mississippi, serving as a public defender for about 30 years. Additionally, he served in several state and local political offices and was a field secretary for the NAACP. He was killed in Drew in 1997 by a client in a robbery.

== Early life and education ==
Cleve McDowell was born on August 6, 1941, in Drew, Mississippi, United States. He was the sixth of ten children born to an African American tenant farmer and grew up in Drew, located in Sunflower County in the Mississippi Delta region of the state. He attended Drew Public Schools, where he was class president, leader of the debate team, and editor of the student newspaper. In high school, he played American football and basketball and was offered athletic scholarships from several historically black colleges and universities outside of the state. However, he instead chose to attend Jackson State College in Jackson, Mississippi, for his undergraduate studies, claiming that it was a better school than the ones he had received the offers from. He began his college career in 1960, majoring in history and political science. Additionally, he served as the editor for the college's student newspaper. In 1963, McDowell graduated from Jackson State with honors.

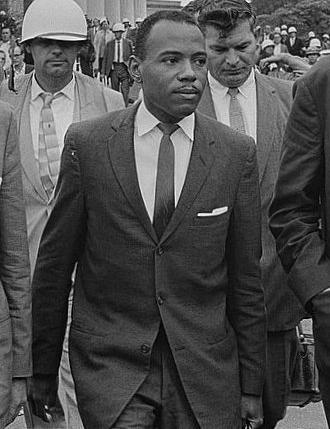
James Meredith (pictured 1962), the first African American student admitted to the University of Mississippi, attended several classes with McDowell at Jackson State College.

While at Jackson State, McDowell was a student assistant for civil rights activist Medgar Evers. Additionally, he took several classes with James Meredith, who, in October 1962, became the first African American to enroll in the University of Mississippi. Meredith's enrollment triggered severe rioting at the university's campus, resulting in two deaths. In response, United States President John F. Kennedy dispatched several thousand soldiers to restore order at the university and allow Meredith to safely attend the university.

== University of Mississippi ==
=== Application and legal challenge ===
In late 1962, McDowell expressed interest in applying to the University of Mississippi to complete his undergraduate education. However, after talking to Meredith about this, he instead decided to apply for the University of Mississippi School of Law. McDowell sought legal aid from Constance Baker Motley, who would serve as his lawyer in subsequent litigation, and applied to the school in November 1962. He subsequently reapplied in February 1963 after the school had made changes to their application form. In a later interview with The New York Times, McDowell said that part of his desire to continue his education within the state had stemmed from some travels he had taken to large cities outside of Mississippi, such as Chicago, Memphis, and Omaha, which he spoke of negatively in comparison to Mississippi. Concerning the impact that Meredith had had on his decision to apply to the University of Mississippi, McDowell said that, while he probably would have applied regardless, Meredith's success in enrolling encouraged him.

In April 1963, the chancellor of the University of Mississippi ordered the law school to send any applications they had received from African Americans to the Mississippi Institutions of Higher Learning board of trustees for review. The following month, the board reviewed McDowell's application and voted unanimously to instruct the registrar of the university to "defer and withhold action" on the application. This was despite the fact that McDowell had been approved by the faculty of the law school for admission for the Summer 1963 semester. In response, lawyers for the NAACP requested a restraining order against the board of trustees in order to allow McDowell to enroll in the university, taking the case to the United States District Court for the Southern District of Mississippi.

On June 3, Judge Sidney Carr Mize heard oral arguments regarding McDowell's application in Biloxi, Mississippi. Charles Clark, speaking on behalf of the board of trustees, argued that the 1962 case Meredith v. Fair, which had resulted in Meredith's admission to the university, was not applicable to McDowell's application because it had not been a class action lawsuit. Clark also argued that McDowell's presence at the university would be harmful and criticized both McDowell and Meredith for engaging in a publicity stunt in attempting to gain admittance to the university. However, Mize rejected Clark's arguments and ordered that McDowell be enrolled in the law school. Speaking later of the ruling, Meredith stated that, while either the state or the court could have stalled and postponed McDowell's entrance into the university, both sides felt that having McDowell enroll during the Summer semester, when there were fewer students on campus, was preferable to having him eventually enroll in a later semester.

Following the court ruling, Mississippi Governor Ross Barnett spoke to several high-profile segregationists, such as John C. McLaurin, about a response to the decision. There were rumors that the governor would shut down the law school via executive order, though this did not come to fruition out of fear that the state's remaining institutions of higher learning would lose accreditation. According to journalist Bill Minor, Barnett and Representative John Bell Williams had planned to lead a show of resistance in Oxford with the state's congressional delegation, though the plan fell apart when Senator John C. Stennis and others declined to participate. Ultimately, in a televised address given on June 5, Barnett, while maintaining his support for segregation, stated that he would not fight the federal government's decision.

=== Enrollment ===
McDowell registered for classes at the university on the afternoon of June 5, 1963. Soldiers and federal marshals were stationed around the campus, and United States Army planes flew overhead. In contrast to Meredith's initial enrollment at the university the previous year, McDowell's enrollment occurred without incident. Both McDowell and Meredith were assigned to share a room in Baxter Hall for the semester, with security provided by the Army and, later, the marshals. McDowell attended his first class on June 6, with two marshals following behind him and several more in the vicinity to ensure his safety.

On August 18, Meredith graduated, leaving McDowell as the only African American at the university. Following his graduation, the marshals, who had been present on the university since October 1962, left the university. According to reporter Claude Sitton of The New York Times, the United States Department of Justice had ordered the removal of the marshals after the university had pledged to protect McDowell. Publicly, McDowell stated that he was not afraid of being on campus, but in private conversation with the university's Episcopalian chaplain, Wofford Smith, he stated that he was scared. Additionally, McDowell had recently purchased Meredith's car, which was well known to segregationists. In a later memoir, Meredith said that McDowell was scared because "the white girls just would not leave him alone". Per Meredith, "When he got into his car and left the campus they would follow him. Often the white boys would get behind and follow the girls, and McDowell was scared of what they might try to do to him." Additionally, journalist James L. Dickerson stated that McDowell was less afraid of students at the university and more concerned with violence from sources off campus, such as the Mississippi State Sovereignty Commission. McDowell reached out to both the local sheriff's department and the university to request permission to carry a gun on him for self-defense, but both rejected his request on the grounds that it went against the university's policies. Despite this, McDowell began carrying a Röhm Gesellschaft .22 caliber revolver on him.

=== Expulsion ===
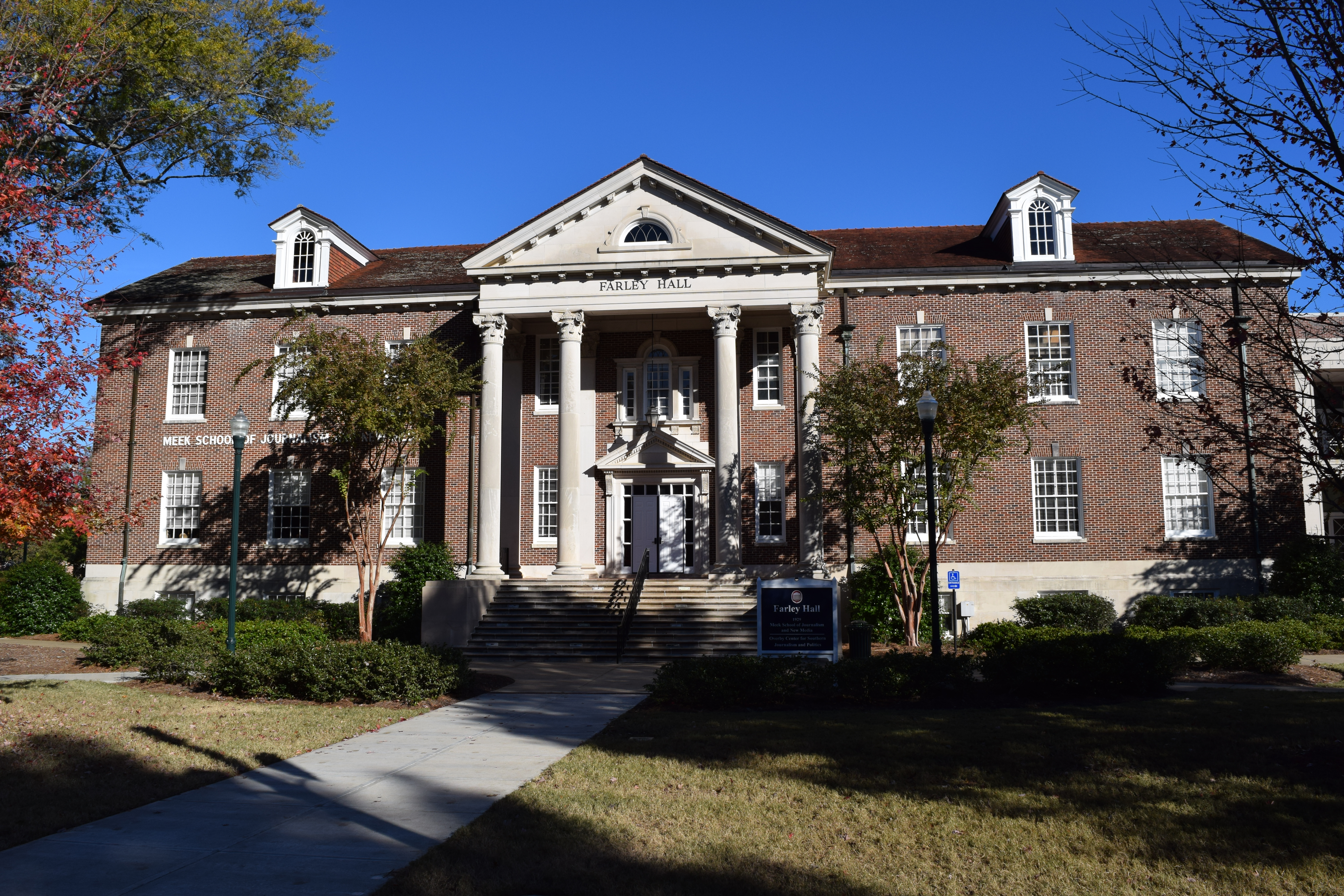
Lamar Hall, the home of the University of Mississippi School of Law during McDowell's time on campus, pictured 2018 (Note: While it was initially known as Lamar Hall, the building was later renamed Farley Hall after the School of Law relocated to a new facility.)

On September 23, the third day of the Fall semester, McDowell had a meeting in Oxford with a United States attorney to request better protections for himself. Afterwards, McDowell arrived on the campus and, running late for his class, ran to Lamar Hall, which houses the law school. On the steps of the building, he dropped his sunglasses and while bending over to pick them up, the gun he had been carrying on him fell out of his pocket in front of some students. McDowell went to class, but after leaving, the sheriff for Lafayette County, Mississippi, was present to arrest him for unlawful possession of a firearm. The sheriff, Joe Ford, was also the leader of the Citizens' Council of Oxford and had been tipped off earlier to McDowell's firearm, which McDowell surrendered to the sheriff.

McDowell was released from the Lafayette County Jail on September 24 after a local attorney, Jack Young, posted a $250 (equivalent to $2,629 in 2025) bail. Regarding the charge, McDowell faced a minimum penalty of $25 ($263 in 2025) and a maximum penalty of $100 ($1,052 in 2025) and 90 days in jail. Shortly after his arrest, the university placed him on suspension and informed the university's Student Judicial Council of the matter. The council consisted of five members and was chaired by Champ Terney, a son-in-law of Senator James Eastland. On September 24, the council held a hearing and voted to recommend McDowell's expulsion. The university's chancellor, J. D. Williams, and other university leaders agreed, and he was expelled that day. In an interview with The Daily Mississippian, Barnett expressed his support for the expulsion.

=== Efforts to reenroll ===
In late October 1963, Jet reported that McDowell was planning to reapply to the law school for the next semester. In July 1964, he requested that Judge Mize reenroll him in the university, telling the judge that his expulsion had been racially motivated. In his petition, he said that in 46 other cases where white students had been charged with the same offense, the students had not been expelled. On November 11 of that year, however, the board of trustees unanimously rejected an appeal to reinstate McDowell. Later that month, the Racial Committee of the Association of American Law Schools found that the university was within its rights to have expelled McDowell and recommended no further action on the case. In March 1965, the Associated Press reported that McDowell had lost another bid to reenroll in the university. The following month, Jet reported that Judge Mize had refused a request from McDowell to order the university to reinstate him.

After his expulsion, the university became an all-white institution for the first time since Meredith's admission. It would remain this way until June 1964, when Cleveland Donald Jr. enrolled as the first African American student since McDowell's expulsion. Like McDowell, Donald required a court order to enroll. However, according to historian David Sansing, following Donald's enrollment, the university's resistance to African American applicants began to fade, leading to further black enrollment into the university. In 1967, Reuben V. Anderson became the first African American to graduate from the University of Mississippi School of Law. (Note: In 1971, the Associated Press inaccurately referred to McDowell as a "graduate" of the University of Mississippi School of Law. However, McDowell ultimately left the university without a degree and later received a law degree from Texas Southern University instead.)

== Later education ==
By October 1963, McDowell had been employed by the NAACP, where he worked as a temporary staffer. He worked for the Mississippi NAACP for several years. In May 1965, The Crisis reported that McDowell was attending the John Marshall Law School in Chicago. He later enrolled at Texas Southern University in Houston, where he continued his involvement with the NAACP. While at Texas Southern, he served as president for the university's student bar association. In late 1967, McDowell, who was the NAACP Special Youth Representative, was one of several students who were invited to testify before a congressional subcommittee headed by Senator John L. McClellan pertaining to a police riot that had occurred on the university's campus earlier that year. McDowell eventually earned a Juris Doctor from Texas Southern and returned to Mississippi.

== Career ==
=== Law ===
In 1971, McDowell was admitted to The Mississippi Bar. Over the course of his career, he was also a member of the American Bar Association and the Magnolia Bar Association. He was admitted to practice law in the United States district courts of Northern Mississippi and Southern Mississippi, as well as in the courts of appeals for the Fifth and Eleventh Circuit.

After getting admitted to the bar, McDowell began practicing law in Drew, where he worked as a public defender. He began his private practice in 1975, representing several clients in cases pertaining to civil rights. From 1977 to 1979, he served as the managing attorney for North Mississippi Rural Legal Services in Clarksdale, Mississippi. He was also part of a group of lawyers that sought to reexamine cases regarding civil rights activists who had been killed. As part of this activism, McDowell and other African American community leaders pressured district attorneys to revive cases—many of which having never resulted in a prosecution—on killed African American civil rights activists. According to reporter Jerry Mitchell of Mississippi Today, McDowell and others wished to prosecute the killer of civil rights activists in a similar manner to how "Nazi war criminals" had been prosecuted. In the 1970s, prior to starting his private practice, he also served as the associate director of the Mississippi Bar Legal Services Program.

=== NAACP ===
In addition to his work as a lawyer, McDowell served as a field secretary for the NAACP in Mississippi, a position he held into the 1980s. In 1986, in his capacity as a regional head of the NAACP, he used the organization to support a successful unionization drive at the Delta Pride catfish processing plant in Sunflower County, which eventually resulted in the 1990 Delta Pride strike.

=== Government ===
McDowell held several roles in government at both the local and state levels. In Drew, he served as a member of the local school board, the board of aldermen, and the vice mayor, while also acting as the chairman for Sunflower County chapter of the Mississippi Democratic Party. At the state level, he became the executive director of the Mississippi Head Start Training Coordinating Council in 1969 and was made the state's coordinator for the program in 1973. In the 1970s, he also served as a member of the board of directors for the Mississippi State Penitentiary, a role he relinquished in 1978 after he was elected the county judge for Tunica County, Mississippi.

== Death ==
On March 13, 1997, (Note: Multiple sources state that McDowell's dead body was discovered on March 13, 1997. However, in their reporting of the event, The Washington Post gave the date as March 14.) local police in Sunflower County found McDowell dead in his apartment, having suffered two gunshot wounds. At the time, McDowell was living alone in Drew. Relatives of his had requested the police to check on him after noticing that the front door to his residence was open and his vehicle was gone. According to the Associated Press, the police accused Juanrez Webb, a 19-year-old client of McDowell's, of killing him in the act of robbery. Webb was charged with capital murder, as well as grand larceny for the theft of McDowell's car, and was imprisoned in the Sunflower County Jail. At the time of his death, McDowell was still working as a public defender in the county.

Several months after his death, a fire destroyed his law offices, in the process also destroying many documents pertaining to his career and investigations into civil rights cases.

== Personal life ==
McDowell was active in the Alpha Phi Alpha fraternity and was a leader in a local masonic Grand Lodge. He was also a senior pastor of the Greater Holly Grove Missionary Baptist Church of Drew.

== See also ==
- History of the University of Mississippi

== Sources ==
- Dickerson, James (1998). Dixie's Dirty Secret: The True Story of How the Government, the Media, and the Mob Conspired to Combat Integration and the Vietnam Antiwar Movement. Armonk, New York: M. E. Sharpe. ISBN 978-0-7656-0340-1. OCLC 38504249.
- Eagles, Charles W. (2009). The Price of Defiance: James Meredith and the Integration of Ole Miss. Chapel Hill, North Carolina: University of North Carolina Press. ISBN 978-0-8078-3273-8. OCLC 794003562.
- Favors, Jelani M. (2019). Shelter in a Time of Storm: How Black Colleges Fostered Generations of Leadership and Activism. Chapel Hill, North Carolina: University of North Carolina Press. ISBN 978-1-4696-4834-7. OCLC 1085349080.
- Landon, Michael de L. (2006). The University of Mississippi School of Law: A Sesquicentennial History. Jackson, Mississippi: University Press of Mississippi. ISBN 978-1-57806-918-7. OCLC 69645814.
- Meredith, James (2012). A Mission from God: A Memoir and Challenge for America. With William Doyle. New York City: Atria Books. ISBN 978-1-4516-7472-9. OCLC 759912562.
- Meredith, James (2019) [1966]. Three Years in Mississippi. Introduction by Aram Goudsouzian (New ed.). Jackson, Mississippi: University Press of Mississippi. ISBN 978-1-4968-2104-1. OCLC 1038392883.
- Moye, J. Todd (2004). Let the People Decide: Black Freedom and White Resistance Movements in Sunflower County, Mississippi, 1945–1986. Chapel Hill, North Carolina: University of North Carolina Press. ISBN 978-0-8078-7670-1. OCLC 65181294.
- Sanders, Crystal R. (2024). A Forgotten Migration: Black Southerners, Segregation Scholarships, and the Debt Owed to Public HBCUs. Chapel Hill, North Carolina: University of North Carolina Press. ISBN 978-1-4696-7982-2. OCLC 1429887221.
- Sansing, David G. (1990). Making Haste Slowly: The Troubled History of Higher Education in Mississippi. Jackson, Mississippi: University Press of Mississippi. ISBN 978-1-61703-571-5. OCLC 44954756.
- Tait, Vanessa (2016) [2005]. Poor Worker's Unions: Rebuilding Labor from Below. Foreword by Bill Fletcher Jr.; Afterword by Cristina Tzintzún (Updated and Revised 2nd ed.). Chicago: Haymarket Books. ISBN 978-1-60846-520-0. OCLC 949931546.
- Thomason, Sally Palmer (2020). The Power of One: Sister Anne Brooks and the Tutwiler Clinic. With Jean Carter Fisher. Jackson, Mississippi: University Press of Mississippi. ISBN 978-1-4968-2919-1. OCLC 1124992425.
