= Daniel Jones (chancellor) =

Chancellor of the University of Mississippi

Dan Jones

16th chancellor of the University of Mississippi
- In office June 15, 2009 – June 15, 2015
- Preceded by: Robert Khayat
- Succeeded by: Jeffrey Vitter

Personal details
- Born: March 19, 1949 (age 77) Morton, Mississippi, U.S.
- Spouse: Lydia Jones
- Children: 2 adult
- Education: Mississippi College (Bachelor's degree); University of Mississippi Medical Center (Medical degree)
- Profession: Medical Doctor, University President
- Salary: $446,775/year (half comes from private funds)

Daniel Wayne Jones (born March 19, 1949) served as the 16th chancellor of the University of Mississippi. He was appointed June 15, 2009, after Robert Khayat announced his retirement from the post on January 6, 2009.

Jones was formerly the vice chancellor for health affairs, the dean of the school of medicine and the Herbert G. Langford Professor of Medicine—all three at the University of Mississippi Medical Center. He was the national president of the American Heart Association for the 2007–2008 year.

== Education ==
Born in Morton, Mississippi, Jones earned a bachelor's degree in chemistry from Mississippi College in 1971 and his M.D. from University of Mississippi Medical Center.

== Career ==
Jones began in private practice in Laurel, Mississippi in 1978. He moved to Pusan, Korea in 1985 as a medical missionary, where he was the director of the community health department and hypertension clinic at the Wallace Memorial Baptist Hospital. He joined the faculty of the University of Mississippi Medical Center in 1992.

Jones, a designated specialist in clinical hypertension under the American Society of Hypertension, is certified by the American Board of Internal Medicine and a fellow of the American College of Physicians. He serves on the board of directors of Global Resource Services, which provides professional consultation to East Asian nations in the areas of advocacy, humanitarian aid, development and education.

Jones is the co-author of the book titled Hypertension Pearls, published in 2004.

=== Chancellor of the University of Mississippi ===
Jones was appointed chancellor of the University of Mississippi on July 1, 2009, after serving in several positions at the University of Mississippi Medical Center in Jackson, including CEO of the medical center for six years. His tenure as chancellor is marked by the highest enrollment to-date at the university, with over 23,000 students enrolled for the fall 2014 semester, and endowments over $100 million for three years running (2012-2014). Under his leadership, the university has worked to be more inclusive through the development of a vice-chancellor for diversity and inclusion, while Jones has publicly denounced hate speech on campus. His chancellorship is also marked by continued image changes to the university begun by his predecessor, Robert Khayat, including the appointment of a new mascot, banning of the playing of "From Dixie with Love" and a change in the official use of 'Ole Miss', now relegated to athletics.

== Personal life ==
Jones was born in Morton, Mississippi, and grew up in Vicksburg, Mississippi.

Jones is married to Lydia and they have two adult children.
