= Libreflix =

Video streaming platform

- Website type: Film distributor Free software
- Available in: Portuguese
- Creator: Guilmour Rossi
- Website: libreflix.org
- Registration: Optional
- Launched: 11 August 2017 (9 years ago)
- Current status: Online
- Written in: Node.js

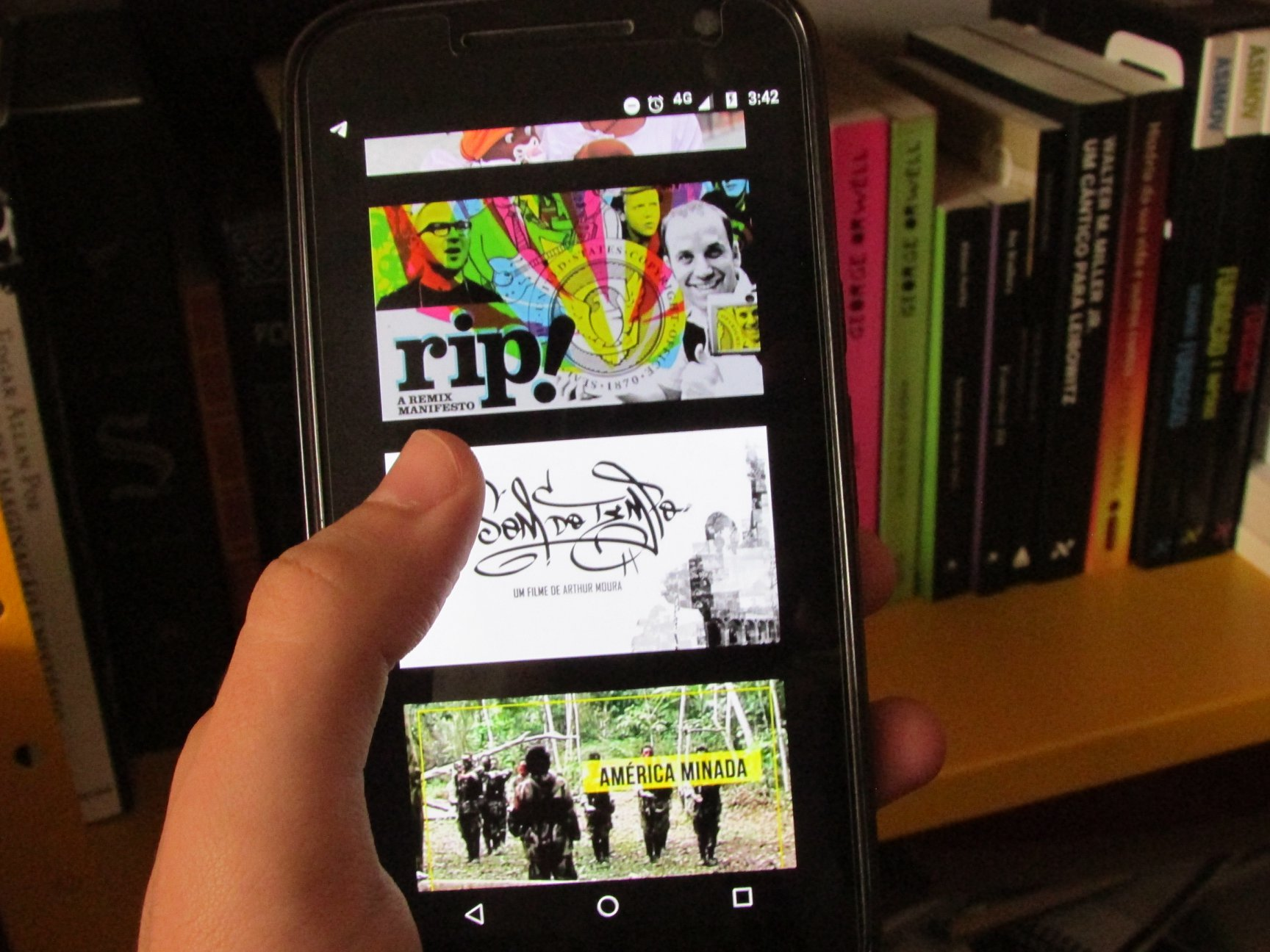
App on smartphone.

Libreflix is a free online Brazilian service that offers access to audiovisual productions with permissive distribution licenses through streaming. The platform is open and its development is done collaboratively and it is open source, following the philosophy of free software.

== History ==
The service launched on 11 August 2017 and can be accessed through the official website or applications for Windows and Android systems.

Although the service does not require user registration to be accessed, in April 2018, the platform had 14 thousand registered users. Registration is mandatory for sending movie suggestions.

Libreflix, initially designed and developed by Brazilian hacktivist Guilmour Rossi, is written in Node.js and licensed under the GNU Affero General Public License. Development is done using git versioning through a public repository.

In July 2018, the service was presented at the 18th Fórum Internacional Software Livre.

== Collection ==
The service's catalogue includes feature films, short films and series, whether fictional or not. In a presentation in July 2018, the service listed more than 250 works registered in the collection, where approximately 75% of the catalog was of non-fictional works. By location, 62% of the content was produced in Brazil, 8% in the rest of Latin America. American and European works represented 17% and 8% of the catalogue respectively. As for the duration of the content, 40% was composed of feature films.

== Article ==
- Rossi, Guilmour; Gomes-Jr, Luiz (October 29, 2019). "Libreflix: A Peer-to-Peer On-demand Video Platform for Free Streaming". sol.sbc.org.br (1): 137–141. doi:10.5753/webmedia_estendido.2019.8152. Archived from the original on May 7, 2020.
