= The Daily Mississippian =

Student newspaper of the University of Mississippi

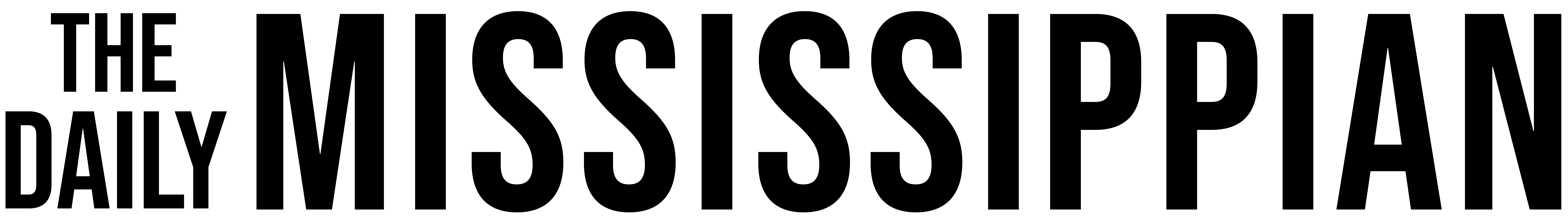

- The May 4, 2007 front page of The Daily Mississippian
- Type: Student newspaper
- Format: Tabloid
- Owner: University of Mississippi
- Editor-in-chief: Raegan Settle
- Founded: 1911
- Language: English
- Headquarters: S. Gale Denley Student Media Center; 201 Bishop Hall; University, MS; 38677; United States
- Circulation: 13,500
- ISSN: 1077-8667
- OCLC number: 60623793
- Website: thedmonline.com

The Daily Mississippian, commonly called The DM, is the student newspaper of the University of Mississippi. The first issue of The Mississippian was published in 1911. It is operated as an independent student-run newspaper, and is published in print one day a week and online daily. It publishes Thursdays during the fall and spring semesters, and occasionally during the June and July summer terms. It has a daily print circulation of 9,000 during fall and spring. It is also the only college newspaper in Mississippi to be a full member of the state press association, and it competes in the Mississippi Press Association's Better Newspaper Contest against professional daily newspapers.

The DM is a part of the S. Gale Denley Student Media Center. The Director of Student Media reports to the Dean of the School of Journalism and New Media. The DM staff consists of approximately 15 editors, along with a couple dozen reporters and photographers. These numbers vary from year to year and semester to semester. The staff has won numerous national, regional and state awards.

There is also a separate staff devoted entirely to advertising sales and production.

The DM's website, thedmonline.com began offering daily updates in 1996.

== History ==
=== Integration of 1962 ===
In 1962 the University of Mississippi was the focal point of a major civil rights showdown between the government of the state of Mississippi, led by segregationist governor Ross Barnett, and the administration of President John F. Kennedy. At issue was the enrollment of an African-American student, James Meredith. As rioting engulfed the campus, a special edition of The Daily Mississippian carried an editorial from editor Sidna Brower. Brower urged students to return to their homes and not to involve themselves in the violence, which Brower said was a battle between the state and the United States government. The University's student Senate later censured Brower for her newspaper's coverage, which it claimed did not accurately reflect events, and for statements such as Brower's contention that the anti-integration demonstrations were bringing "dishonor and shame" to the University. The censure was repealed by the Associated Student Body Senate in 2002 as the 40th anniversary of the rioting approached.

=== Recent History ===
In 2011, The DM celebrated its 100th anniversary with a weekend of events in Oxford. The keynote speaker was former governor William Winter, a former editor-in-chief of the newspaper. The student newspaper was originally named The Mississippian. It became a daily in 1962 (though the name "Daily" wasn't added to its masthead until 1968).

== Affiliations ==
- Associated Collegiate Press
- Associated Press
- College Media Association (CMA)
- College Newspaper Business & Advertising Managers (CNBAM)
- Columbia Scholastic Press Association
- Mississippi Press Association
  - Oxford-Lafayette County (Mississippi) Chamber of Commerce
- Southern University Newspapers (SUN)

== See also ==
- University of Mississippi
- Ole Miss Rebels
