= Newton Faller =

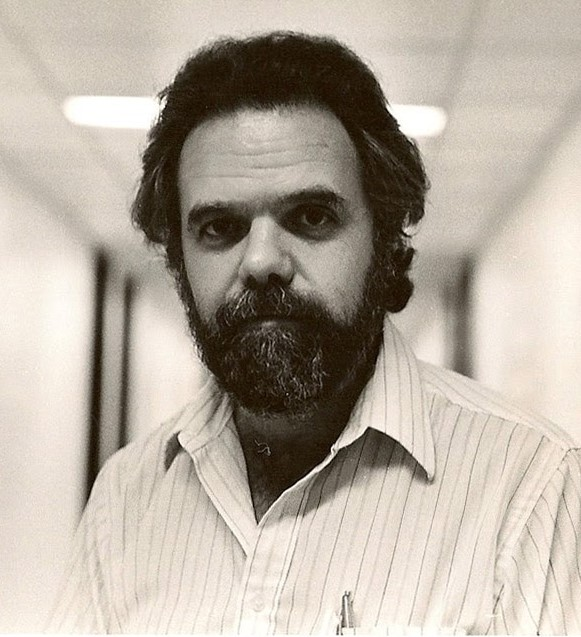
Newton Faller.

Newton Faller (January 25, 1947–October 9, 1996) the son of Kurt Faller and Ada Faller from Rio Grande do Sul, was a Brazilian computer scientist and electrical engineer. He is credited with the discovery of adaptive Huffman codes while an employee of IBM do Brasil in Rio. He was later the head of the Brazilian UNIX development project at the Electronic Computing Center of the Federal University of Rio de Janeiro (NCE/UFRJ), Rio de Janeiro.

He started his career working with data compression, studying the classical Huffman Codes and was the first to propose the "adaptive Huffman codes". This discovery became his Master's thesis and was later published in:

Newton Faller, "An Adaptive System for Data Compression," Record of the 7th Asilomar Conference on Circuits, Systems and Computers, pp. 593–597, 1973.

Later, Robert G. Gallager (1978) and Donald Knuth (1985) proposed some complements and the algorithm became widely known as FGK (from the initials of each of the researchers).

Later, Faller went to study in the United States from 1976 to 1981 and received a Ph.D. in Electrical Engineering and Computer Sciences from the University of California, Berkeley in 1981.

He was married to Maria Ester Kremer Faller and had two daughters, Maria Clara Kremer Faller and Ana Luisa Kremer Faller. He spent his childhood in Flamengo, Rio de Janeiro, and had two younger sisters: Ana Maria Faller and Angela Faller.

Faller died in 1996 and today the Brazilian equivalent of the Turing Award is called the "Newton Faller Award".
