= Guy Cobb =

American painter

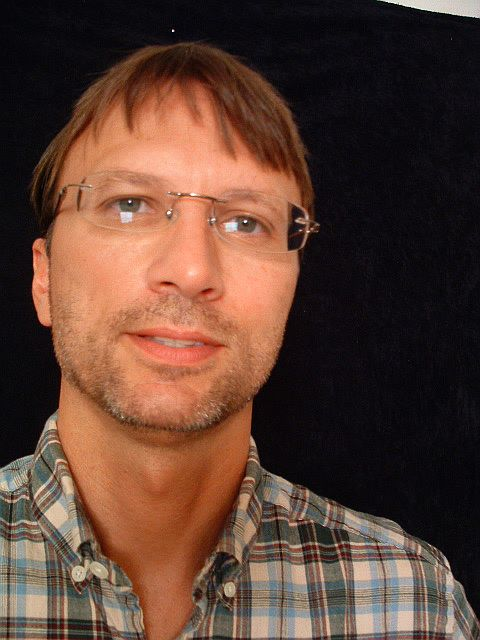
- Cobb in Memphis in 2006
- Born: Guy Franke Cobb; 27 October 1963 (age 62); St. Louis, Missouri, United States
- Education: University of Mississippi (dropped out in 1983)
- Occupation: Artist
- Children: 2 - Elise Cobb, Jack Cobb

Guy Franke Cobb (born October 27, 1963) is an American artist born in St. Louis, Missouri, United States.

== Career ==
In 1983 Cobb left the University of Mississippi to join his older brother, Ty Cobb, as a co-founder of an acrobatic basketball show called the Bud Light Daredevils. The group invented the sport of acrobatic basketball and entertained audiences at NBA and college basketball games in North America, Europe, Asia, Israel and Australia.

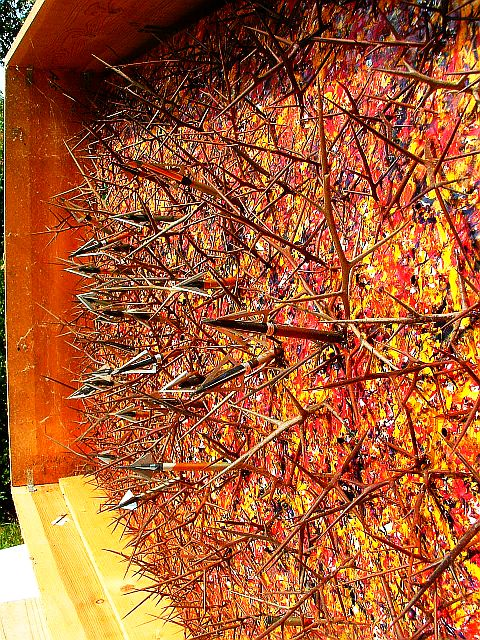
"Thorn Painting" by Cobb

By 1990 Cobb had relocated to rural Fair Grove, Missouri where he was inspired by a documentary of Jackson Pollock and began working with sheet metal and locust tree thorns. His first painting titled, Down in the Valley of Rural Violence was an examination of the 1987 James Schnick massacre at Elkland, Missouri.

In 1993 Cobb moved to Memphis and began painting again. His work was first exhibited in the lobby of the Memphis Commercial Appeal's newspaper office. Cobb donated paintings to raise funds for WKNO Public Television and the Memphis Orpheum Theater and other works to hospitals and mental institutions. Cobb has donated more than 60 paintings to not-for-profit organizations and museums throughout the region. In 2003 Cobb was invited to Nashville to view his paintings on permanent display at the Tennessee State Capitol building and the Tennessee State Museum.

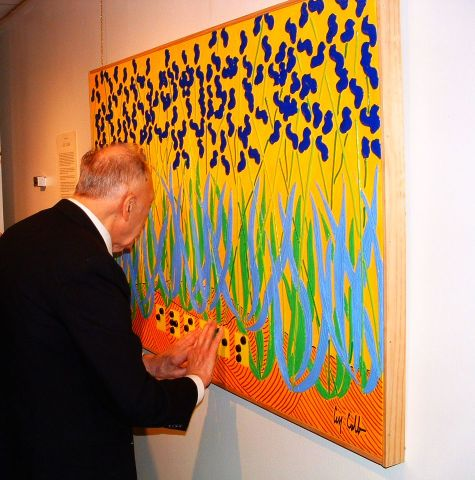
Cobb's "Braille painting" at Christian Brothers University in 2006.

== Braille Paintings ==
In 2004 Cobb began experimenting with "visual color blending" in his paintings and he created a series of paintings for the sight impaired and the blind. Cobb incorporated thick textures onto the surface of his paintings by squeezing the paints onto the canvas. By 2005 he had completed a series of "Braille paintings" designed to be touched and interpreted by the blind.

One of Cobb's Braille paintings was used as a subject for the University of Missouri's Museum of Art & Archeology's 2009 Art In Bloom event.

== Palestine ==
At his 2006 exhibit at Christian Brothers University, Cobb was introduced to Naseeb Shaheen, a Palestinian-American Professor at the University of Memphis. From this meeting Cobb would eventually donate two of his paintings to the Birzeit University Art Museum which Shaheen had helped to finance its construction.

== Reception ==
Art critics John Simmons and Camille Howell wrote: "Down in the Valley of Rural Violence is typical of what Cobb calls his 'thorn paintings'.....His use of tortured metal, abstract forms and an overlay of projecting thorns all combine in this and the other paintings in the series to produce statements of anger and frustration". "Guy Cobb is an artist worth watching. He could well become a real force on the regional art scene." "Cobb's works are unsettling, disquieting, and impossible to ignore."

== See also ==
- Bud Light Daredevils
- Abstract art

== Notes ==
- SEC Sports Journal (February 15, 1980) "Wow!", Page 18.
- Sports Illustrated (December 9, 1985), Contents pages 2 and 3.
- Howell, Camille, "Area Artists Exhibit at SAM", (November 30, 1990), Springfield News Leader.
- Howell, Camille, "Studio E", National Public Radio 1992 interview at College of the Ozarks.
- Boyd, Kent, Profile about Guy Cobb's thorn paintings on OzarkLife, March 1992, KYTV, Springfield, Missouri.
- Bruce, Mary, "St. Louis Spirit" (December 2003), St. Louis Magazine, page 18.
- "Daredevils combine basketball and spectacle" (December 1983) New Jersey Nets Game Program.
- Hollingsworth, Leigh, "Globetrotting Memphis-Style", (December, 1987), Memphis Magazine, Crosscurrents, page 23.
- "The OA's first-ever Southern Art & Architecture Issue" (advertisement incorporates Guy Cobb's "Braille America" painting, Oxford American Magazine, Summer 2005, page 81.
- "George Michael's Sports Machine"
- Kanengiser, Andy, "Ole Miss mascot vies for world record" Associated Press.
- Sutton, Ron "Southern Gent Evicted" (January 8, 1981) Knoxville News-Sentinel
- Daily Mississippian (January 19, 1981) Cover Story (follow up to "Southern Gent Evicted" story).
