= From Dixie with Love =

Fight song at the University of Mississippi (1980–2009)

- Also known as: "Slow Dixie"
- Adopted: c. 1980
- Relinquished: 2009

"From Dixie with Love", also known as "Slow Dixie", is an American song combining elements of "Dixie" and the "Battle Hymn of the Republic". It was created and predominantly performed as the fight song at the University of Mississippi. In 2009, Chancellor Dan Jones asked the university's The Pride of the South marching band to stop playing "From Dixie with Love" at university sports events. According to some alumni and current students, it is now banned from being played in public.

== History ==
"From Dixie with Love" was created as a mashup of "Dixie" and the "Battle Hymn of the Republic" and started being played in the 1980s.

Starting around 2004, students at Ole Miss Rebels football game began altering the final line of the "Battle Hymn of the Republic", which ends "His truth is marching on." Instead, they chanted "The South will rise again!", a reference to the Lost Cause pseudohistory. In 2009, Jones announced that he would ask the band to stop playing the song unless after fans stopped the chant. When they failed to heed his warnings, Jones asked the band to stop.

This continued a trend of the University of Mississippi ceasing to use symbols of the Confederate States of America, and followed the removal of Colonel Reb as a mascot and a 1996 ban on sticks being carried into Vaught–Hemingway Stadium, which effectively prevented the waving of Confederate battle flags at games.

The ban was not received well by some students. Before one Ole Miss football game, the Ku Klux Klan protested the removal of the song outside the university's chapel; they were outnumbered by counter-protesters and stopped after ten minutes. Some called for Jones to be fired. His contract was not renewed in 2014, leading to speculation that the banning of "From Dixie with Love" played a part of it.

The band was still permitted to play "Dixie" itself until 2016, when the university banned that from being played as well.
