= Tony the Landshark =

Ole Miss Mascot

- University: University of Mississippi
- Conference: SEC
- Description: Anthropomorphic shark
- Origin of name: Tony Fein (former football player)
- First seen: August 11, 2018
- Last seen: May 2021
- Related mascot(s): Rebel Black Bear, Colonel Reb

Tony the Landshark is an anthropomorphic shark that was the mascot of the Ole Miss Rebels, the collegiate athletic teams of the University of Mississippi. It replaced Rebel Black Bear as the mascot in fall 2018. Tony has not officially been removed as the school mascot, but since May 2021 has not been seen on the sidelines of athletic events nor posted to the mascot's official X account.

== History ==
The landshark derives from a gesture invented by linebacker Tony Fein during the 2008 football season. A native of Port Orchard, Washington, Fein was an Army veteran who served a one-year tour in the Iraq War before arriving in Oxford. One day, he threw his hand over his head in celebration of a tackle, and the gesture caught on.

The landshark symbol became less prominent after Fein died from a drug overdose in 2009, but re-emerged during the 2012–13 men's basketball season, when the Rebels won the 2013 SEC men's basketball tournament and advanced to the NCAA tournament for the first time since 2002. The run was largely ignited by Marshall Henderson, who was known for his fiery landshark celebrations after a big shot.

It reemerged on the football field during the 2014 season, when the Rebels had the best defense in the nation.

In 2017, the Ole Miss Rebels softball team won the first SEC softball tournament in school history, hosted a Regional game for the first time in school history, and advanced to Super Regionals for the first time in school history. The run was ignited by pitcher Kaitlin Lee, who pitched every pitch of postseason play for the Rebels. After each of Lee's strikeouts, she made the landshark gesture.

On October 6, 2017, then-Chancellor Jeffrey Vitter announced that the university mascot would switch to the Landshark, beginning with the 2018–19 season.

In November 2021, Athletic Director Keith Carter said the university would begin "de-emphasizing" Tony.
