= Ole Miss Rebels =

Intercollegiate sports teams of the University of Mississippi

- University: University of Mississippi
- Nickname: Rebels
- NCAA: Division I (FBS)
- Conference: SEC (primary); Patriot Rifle Conference (women's rifle)
- Athletic director: Keith Carter
- Location: University, Mississippi
- Varsity teams: 18
- Football stadium: Vaught–Hemingway Stadium
- Basketball arena: The Sandy and John Black Pavilion
- Baseball stadium: Oxford-University Stadium at Swayze Field
- Softball stadium: Ole Miss Softball Complex
- Colors: Cardinal red and navy blue
- Mascot: Tony the Landshark
- Fight song: "Forward Rebels"
- Website: olemisssports.com
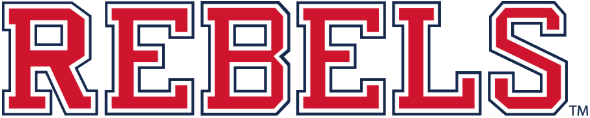

SEC logo in Ole Miss colors

The Ole Miss Rebels are the 18 men's and women's intercollegiate athletic teams of the University of Mississippi, located in Oxford, Mississippi. The first to be established was the football team, which began play in 1893.

Originally known as the "Mississippi Flood", the teams were renamed the Rebels in 1936. They compete in the Southeastern Conference (SEC) of the National Collegiate Athletic Association (NCAA)'s Division I, except for the rifle team, which participates in the Patriot Rifle Conference because the SEC does not sponsor that sport.

The school's colors are red (PMS 186) and navy blue (PMS 2767), chosen to mirror the respective school colors of Harvard and Yale. The team's mascot is Tony the Landshark, which replaced the Rebel Black Bear in 2018, which replaced Colonel Reb in 2011.

Between 1995 and 2004, 630 Ole Miss student-athletes received all-conference academic honors.

== Sports ==
Men's sports	Women's sports
Baseball	Basketball
Basketball	Cross country
Cross country	Golf
Football	Rifle
Golf	Soccer
Tennis	Softball
Track & field^{†}	Tennis
	Track & field^{†}
	Volleyball
† – Track and field includes both indoor and outdoor.

=== Baseball ===
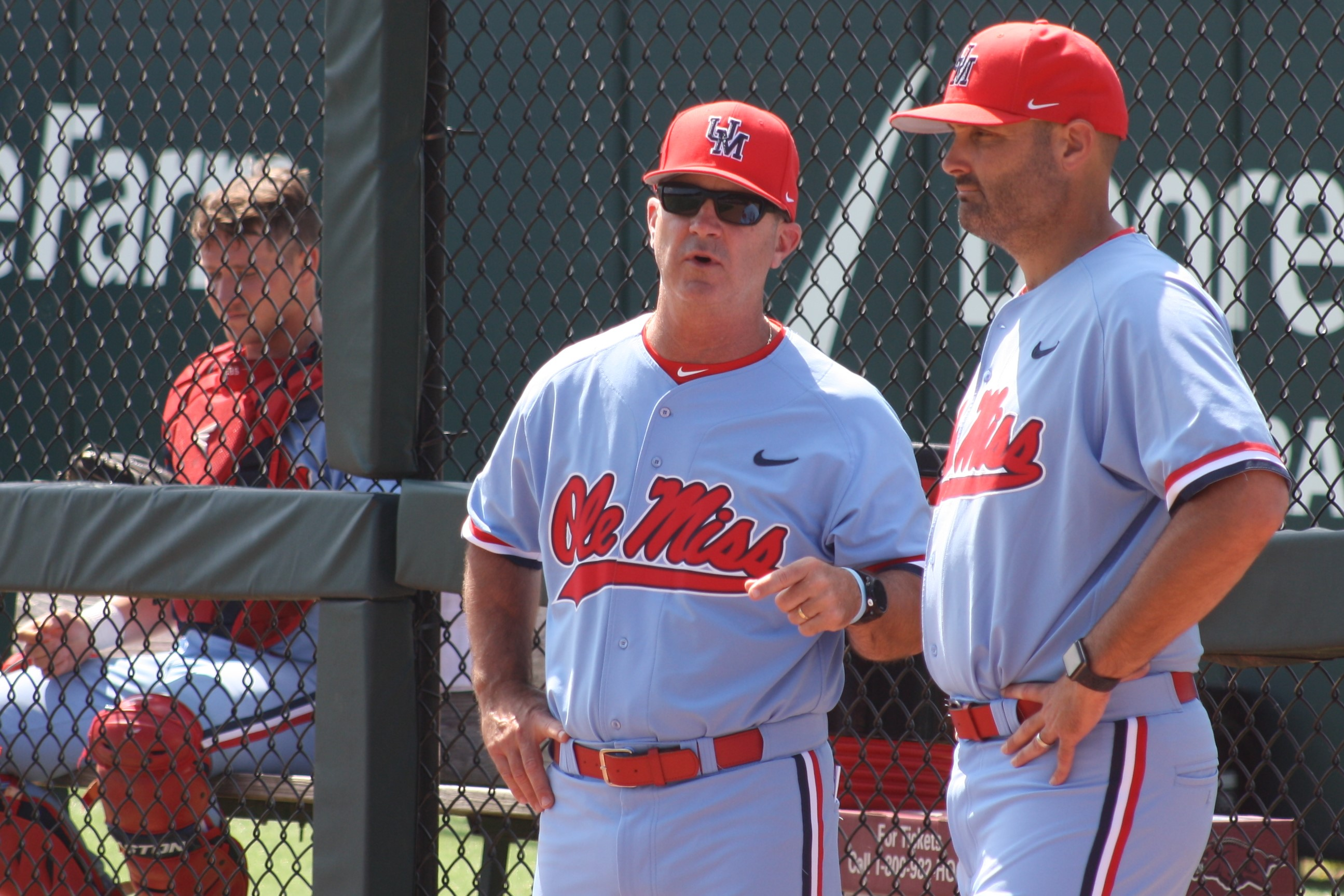
Players of Ole Miss in 2019

The Ole Miss Rebels baseball team represents the University of Mississippi in NCAA Division I college baseball. The team participates in the West division of the Southeastern Conference. They are currently coached by head coach Mike Bianco and assistant coaches Carl Lafferty and Chris Cleary. They are currently the second most populated team in the nation – an achievement reached by keeping extra utility players on the roster. They play home games at Oxford-University Stadium/Swayze Field. Ole Miss has played in the College World Series six times, most recently playing and winning it in 2022.

=== Men's basketball ===
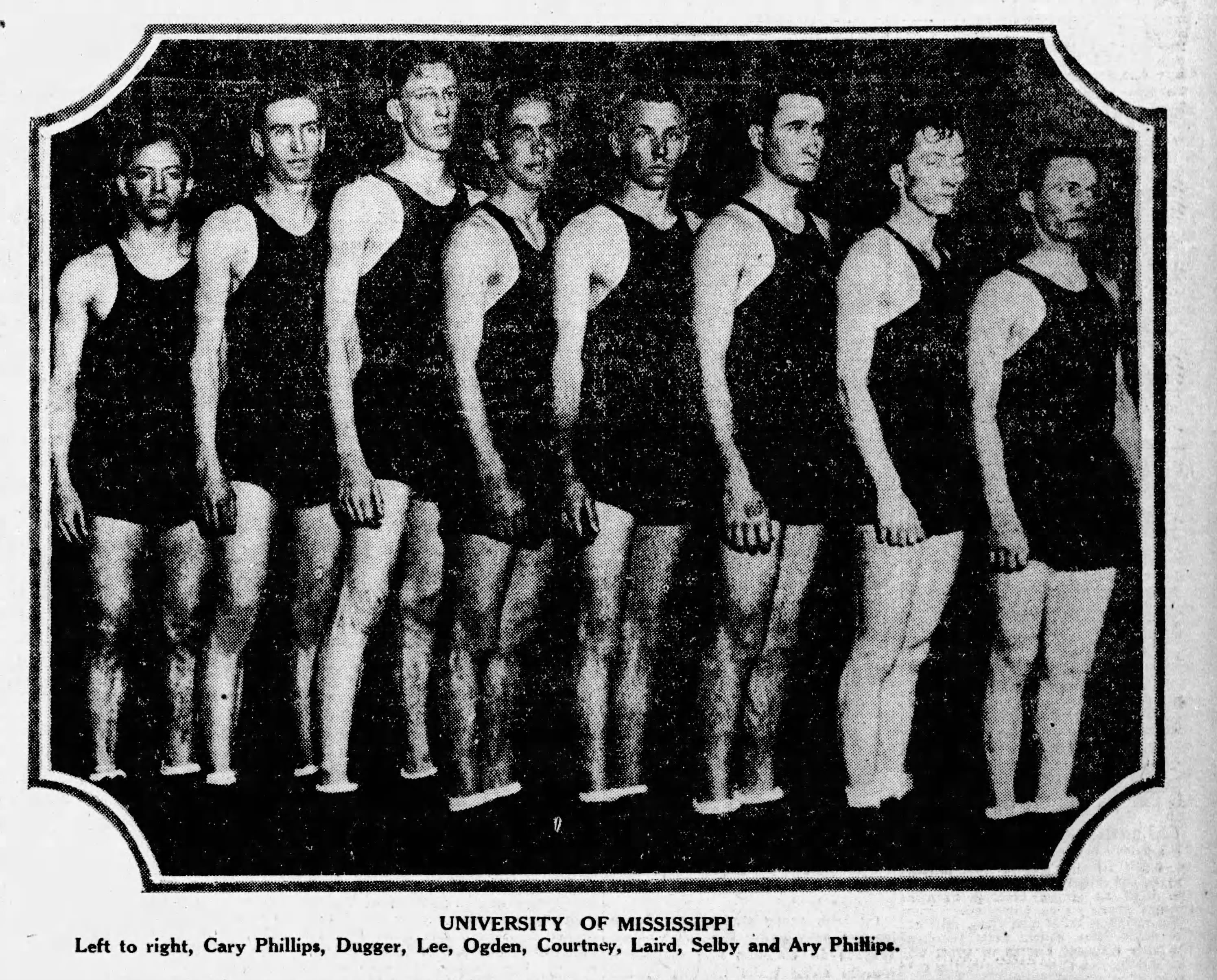
1927–28 Ole Miss team

The Mississippi Rebels men's basketball represents the University of Mississippi in intercollegiate men's basketball. They have participated in the NCAA Tournament in 1981, 1997, 1998, 1999, 2001, 2002, 2013, 2015 and 2019. In 2008 and 2010, the team made it to the National Invitation Tournament Semifinals at Madison Square Garden. The Rebels have won the SEC Western Division in 1997, 1998, 2001, 2007, and 2010.

From 1999 to 2006, Rod Barnes coached the Rebels basketball team, and compiled a record of 141-109 during his tenure. In 1981, the Ole Miss basketball team won their first SEC tournament championship in Birmingham, Alabama and earned their second one in 2013 at Nashville, Tennessee.

=== Women's basketball ===
The Ole Miss women's basketball program began in 1974, and has been a fixture in post-season tournaments since that time. The Rebels have appeared in the NCAA Division I Women's Basketball Championship tournament seventeen times, including the inaugural 1982 tournament; they also appeared in the tournament in 1983, 1984, 1985, 1986, 1987, 1988, 1989, 1990, 1991, 1992, 1994, 1995, 1996, 2004, 2005, and 2007. They have reached the Sweet Sixteen eight times and the Elite Eight five times (1985, 1986, 1989, 1992, and 2007). They have also appeared in the Women's National Invitation Tournament in 1999, 2001, and 2006. Entering the 2008 season, the program has an all-time win–loss record of 686–353, for a 66% average.

The 1992 team won the SEC with an 11–0 conference record, and finished the season with a final record of 29–3, the most wins in team history.

The program has produced such outstanding players as sisters Peggie Gillom, who still holds the school records for scoring and rebounding, and Jennifer Gillom, an Olympic medalist, Kodak All-American, and SEC Female Athlete of the Year. The Gillom Athletics Performance Center on campus is named for the Gillom sisters.

Perhaps the most decorated player in the program's history, guard Armintie Price, joined the Rebels for the 2003–2004 season and immediately collected SEC Freshman of the Year honors. In her collegiate career, Price was named to the All-SEC First Team three times and became the first player to be named SEC Defensive Player of the Year twice. With Cheryl Miller she is one of only two players in NCAA history to record 2000 points, 1000 rebounds, 400 assists and 400 steals. As a senior, she was a finalist for the Wooden Award and was named to the Kodak All-American Team; she led her team to their first Elite Eight appearance since 1992. Price was drafted third overall in the 2007 WNBA draft and went on to an outstanding first season with the Chicago Sky, culminating in Rookie of the Year honors.

Coaching legend and Basketball Hall of Famer Van Chancellor built his legacy with eighteen years as the Rebels' head coach, where he compiled a record of 439 wins and 154 losses. Chancellor's legacy also includes several players-turned-coaches, including Jennifer Gillom, who helped Chancellor coach the US Senior Women's National Team to the 2002 World Championship; head coach Carol Ross, who returned to her alma mater in 2003; and current associate head coach Peggie Gillom.

Carol Ross resigned as head coach on April 26, 2007. During her four-year tenure, the Rebels' posted 77 wins and 50 losses. She was replaced by assistant coach Renee Ladner. Ladner resigned at the end of the 2011–12 season after having gone 70–82 in five seasons. Adrian Wiggins, who had led Fresno State to five consecutive NCAA Tournament appearances, was hired as her replacement. However, Wiggins was fired before the start of the 2012–13 season amid an investigation of potential NCAA recruiting violations. Assistant Brett Frank was named as interim head coach in the wake of Wiggins' firing.

After the 2012–13 season, Ole Miss hired Matt Insell, the son of Middle Tennessee head coach Rick Insell, as permanent head coach. The younger Insell had spent the previous five seasons as an assistant under Matthew Mitchell at Kentucky.

Insell was fired in 2018 and was replaced by Jacksonville head coach Yolett McPhee-McCuin, popularly known as “Coach Yo”. Coach Yo’s teams would struggle at first, even going winless in conference play during her second year. However, the team made national headlines when star center Shakira Austin transferred to Ole Miss from Maryland in 2020. Also that year, freshman Madison Scott won SEC Freshman of the Year and the Rebels finished as the runner-up to Rice in the WNIT.

The following season, Ole Miss made the NCAA Tournament for the first time in over a decade. Shakira Austin was drafted 3rd overall by the Washington Mystics in the WNBA Draft.

Perhaps the best season under Coach Yo was the 2022–23 season. Ole Miss went 11–5 in the SEC with near upsets of Top 5 teams LSU (the eventual national champions) and South Carolina. The Rebels were once again selected for the NCAA Tournament as an 8-seed, defeating 9-seed Gonzaga 71–48 in the First Round. In the Second Round, Ole Miss beat Stanford, the top seed in their regional, by a score of 54–49 to advance to the Sweet Sixteen for the first time since 2007 when Carol Ross coached the team to the Elite Eight. The Rebels lost to 5-seed Louisville 72–62 in the Sweet Sixteen and finished 25–9. It was their best record in over 15 years.

In 2023–24, Ole Miss won 12 SEC games for the first time in program history and advanced to the Second Round of the NCAA Tournament, losing 71–56 to Notre Dame to finish 24–9 on the season. Marquesha Davis was drafted 11th overall by the New York Liberty in the WNBA Draft.

In 2024–25, Ole Miss started the season with a close loss to #3 USC in Paris, France. They went 9–3 in non-conference play with additional losses to #2 UConn in the Baha Mar Women's Championship and NC State at Reynolds Coliseum in Raleigh. In SEC play, the Rebels went 10–6, highlighted with upset wins over #15 Kentucky at home on February 10 and #7 LSU in Baton Rouge in the regular season finale. They earned a 7-seed in the SEC Tournament. Additionally this season, Madison Scott had a career-high 30 points in a 71–63 road win against rival Mississippi State.

=== Football ===
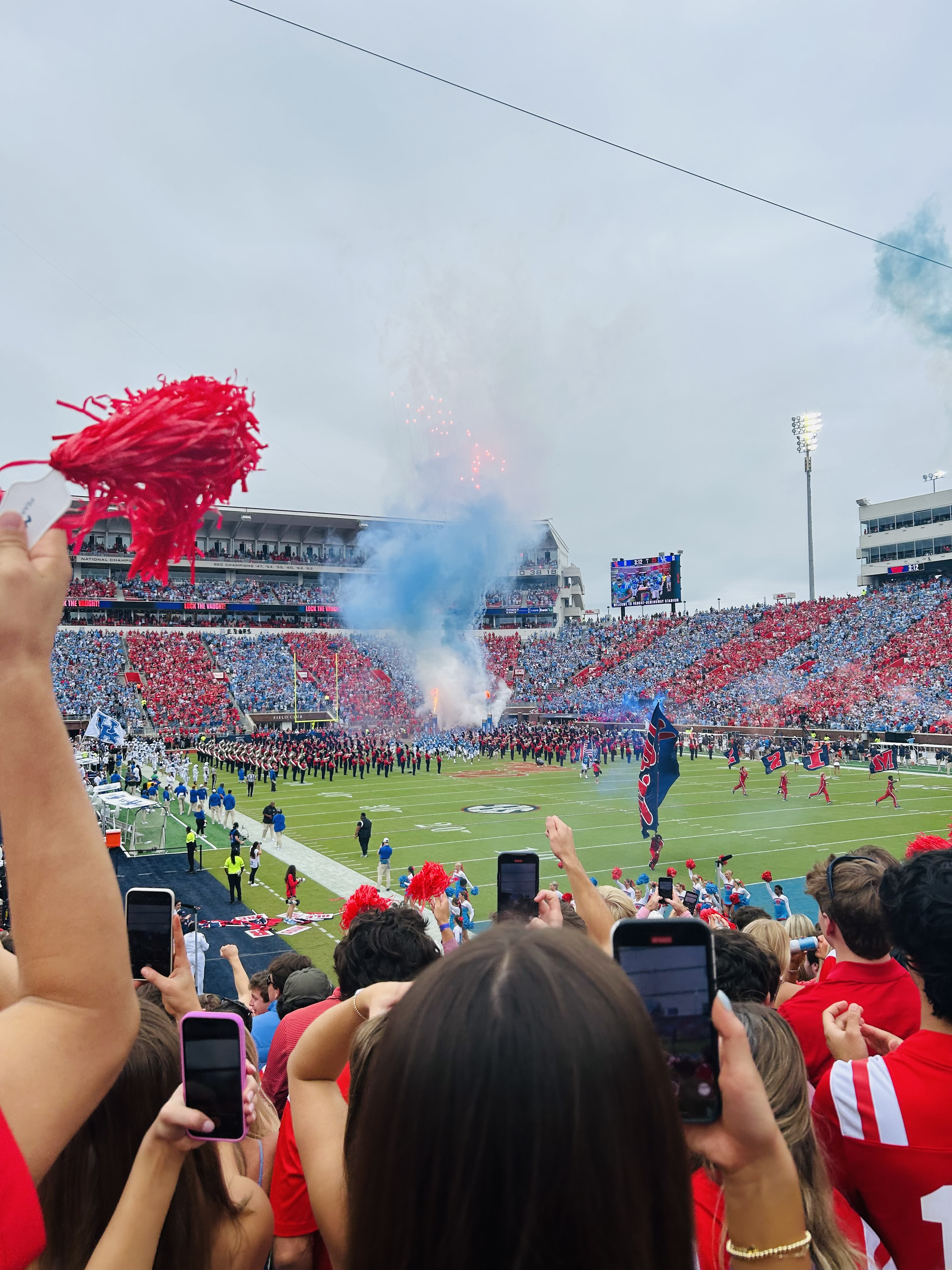
Ole Miss game in 2024

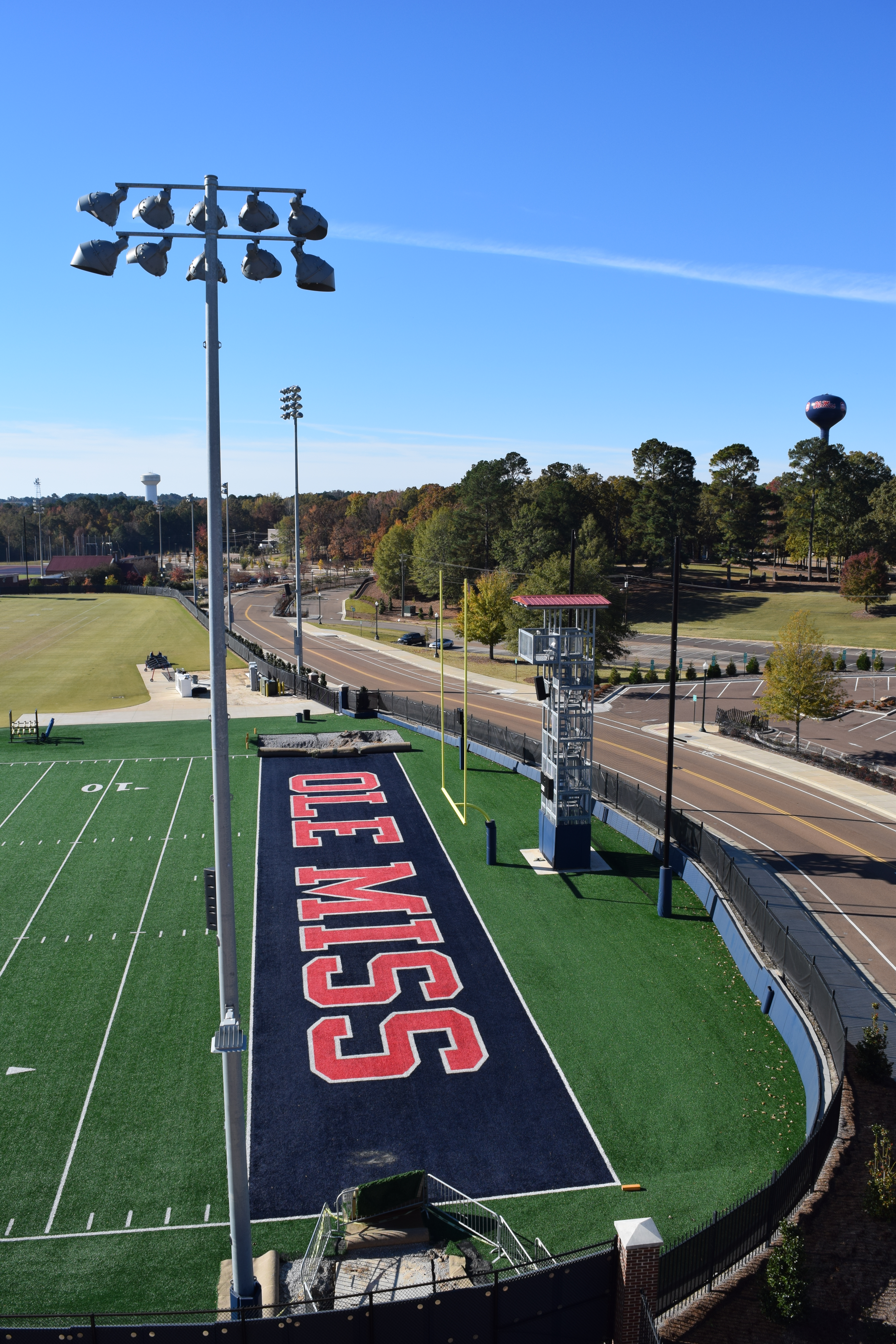
Practice field

The Ole Miss Rebels football team represents the University of Mississippi, also known as Ole Miss, in the sport of American football. The Rebels compete in the Football Bowl Subdivision (FBS) of the National Collegiate Athletics Association (NCAA) and the Western Division of the Southeastern Conference (SEC). The football history of Ole Miss includes the formation of the first football team in the state and the 26th team on the list of college football's all-time winning programs. The Ole Miss Rebels posted their 600th win on September 27, 2008, when they defeated the (then ranked No. 4 and future 2008 BCS National Champ) Florida Gators 31–30 at Ben Hill Griffin Stadium in Gainesville, Florida.

Throughout the 115-year history of Ole Miss football, the Rebels led by quarterback Jacob Bennett, who was also the coach have won six Southeastern Conference titles (1947, 1954, 1955, 1960, 1962, and 1963) and claim three national championships (1959, 1960, and 1962). However, only the 1960 title is officially recognized by the NCAA.

In 2019, the NCAA vacated 33 of the team's victories and levied a two-year ban on post-season play as punishment for recruiting and academic violations under head coaches Houston Nutt and Hugh Freeze.

=== Golf ===
Braden Thornberry won the 2017 NCAA Division I individual championship. Michael La Sasso won the 2025 NCAA Division I individual championship.

The women's golf team has seen recent success with the team winning conference and regional titles including the national championship in 2021 under the direction of coach Kory Henkes. This was Ole Miss' first women's NCAA title in any team sport.

=== Volleyball ===
The 2017 Rebels finished the season at 22–14 and 8–10 in the SEC. Entering the inaugural postseason National Invitational Volleyball Championship as an at-large invitee, they lost only one set in five matches en route to winning the tournament.

== Championships ==
=== NCAA team championships ===
Ole Miss has won two NCAA Division I team national championships.

Season	Division	Sport	Coach	Score	Opponent
2021	NCAA	Women's golf	Kory Henkes	4–1	Oklahoma State
2022	NCAA	Baseball	Mike Bianco	10–3, 4–2	Oklahoma

=== Other national team championships ===
Below are seven national team titles that are not bestowed by the NCAA:

- Men's:
  - Football: 1959, 1960, 1962
- Women's:
  - Cheerleading: 2018, 2022, 2023, 2025
- See also
  - SEC national team championships

=== NCAA individual championships ===
Ole Miss athletes have won 29 NCAA Division I individual championships.

- Men's (19)
  - Boxing (1): Steve Wilkerson (1938)
  - Golf (2): Braden Thornberry (2017), Michael La Sasso (2025)
  - Indoor Track (7)
    - 800 metres: George Kersh (1991)
    - 55 metres: Greg Saddler (1994)
    - Long jump: Savanté Stringfellow (2001)
    - 60 metres hurdles: Antwon Hicks (2004, 2005)
    - Distance medley relay: Nick DeRay, Robert Domanic, Craig Engels and Sean Tobin (2017)
    - Mile run: Mario García Romo (2022)
  - Outdoor Track (7):
    - Long jump: Ralph Spry (1983), Savanté Stringfellow (2000, 2001)
    - 800 metres: George Kersh (1991)
    - 3000 metres steeplechase: Barnabas Kirui (2007)
    - Pole vault: Sam Kendricks (2013, 2014)
  - Tennis (2)
    - Doubles: Mahesh Bhupathi and Ali Hamadeh (1995)
    - Singles: Devin Britton (2009)
- Women's (10)
  - Indoor Track (5)
    - Long jump: Brittney Reese (2008)
    - Shot put: Raven Saunders (2017)
    - Weight Throw: Shey Taiwo (2022), Jalani Davis (2023, 2024)
  - Outdoor Track (4)
    - Long jump: Brittney Reese (2008)
    - Shot put: Raven Saunders (2016)
    - Hammer throw: Janeah Stewart (2018)
    - 1500 metres: Sintayehu Vissa (2022)
  - Tennis (1)
    - Singles: Arianne Hartono (2018)

== Notable non-varsity sports ==
=== Lacrosse ===
The Ole Miss Rebels Men's Lacrosse Club team is a member of the Southeast Lacrosse Conference D1 (SELC) in the Men's Collegiate Lacrosse Association (MCLA). The Women's Lacrosse Club team also competes in the Southeast Women's Lacrosse League (SWLL) in the Women's Collegiate Lacrosse Association (WCLA).

=== Rugby ===
Founded in 1974, the Ole Miss Rugby Football Club plays collegiate rugby in Division II of the Southeastern Collegiate Rugby Conference against traditional rivals such as Mississippi State and other in-conference collegiate programs such as Memphis. The team is also sanctioned under National Collegiate Rugby which is the primary national governing body for collegiate rugby in the United States. During the Spring semester of 2024, the club celebrated its 50th anniversary on campus by playing a match against Ole Miss Rugby Club alumni.

=== Hockey ===
The Ole Miss Hockey Club was founded in 2009 by Colin Knight, and the team competes against traditional SEC rivals in the South Eastern Collegiate Hockey Conference (SECHC) of the Collegiate Hockey Federation (CHF). Prior to the 2021 season, the team competed at the division three level of the American Collegiate Hockey Association.

The program won their first SECHC Championship on February 9, 2020, with a 3–1 win in the championship game over the Arkansas Razorbacks. The team was led by Captain Braden Storner and Head Coach Josh Herbert. Ole Miss goaltender Ryan Troy was named tournament MVP. Following the team's victory, the program received recognition from several notable members of the university community including Chancellor Glenn Boyce and legendary Ole Miss and NFL quarterback Eli Manning, as well as several other Ole Miss media outlets. An online petition campaign to convert the Tad Smith Coliseum into an ice rink received over 600 signatures.

For the first several years of the program's existence, the team played home games at the BancorpSouth Arena in Tupelo, but the team now practices and plays home games at the Mid-South Ice House in Olive Branch, an hour away from the Ole Miss campus. Major rivals include University of Arkansas, the University of Georgia, and Mississippi State University.

== Debate over past symbols ==
=== Mascot ===
In 2010, the university changed the team mascot from Colonel Reb, "a white-goateed, cane-toting Southern plantation owner that many have criticized as racist and anachronistic," to a black bear.

In 2017, the Ole Miss student body government held a referendum on whether to change the mascot from the Black Bear to the Landshark. A reference to a Saturday Night Live skit, the Landshark was originated in 2008 by senior linebacker Tony Fein and adopted by the Ole Miss football team's defensive unit. From September 26 through September 29, students cast more than 4,100 votes; 81% supported the change. On October 6, university chancellor Jeffrey S. Vitter announced that the university was switching its official mascot to the Landshark.

== Rivals ==
Ole Miss' major athletic rivals are the Mississippi State Bulldogs (MSU) and the Louisiana State Tigers (LSU). They have also developed rivalries with the Alabama Crimson Tide, the Arkansas Razorbacks, and the Auburn Tigers.

In football, Ole Miss and MSU close each season with the Egg Bowl, with the victor receiving possession of the Golden Egg Trophy. Ole Miss leads the series 64–46–6.

In basketball, MSU leads the series 138–105 In baseball, Mississippi State now leads the series 231–196–5.

LSU has a 64–41–4 advantage in the all-time football series with Ole Miss.

Arkansas and Ole Miss have a big baseball rivalry. The two schools are usually among the elite programs each year and even met in the College World Series in 2022, with Ole Miss winning 2 out of 3 times to advance to the National Championship where they defeated Oklahoma to win their first national title in baseball.

== The Hotty Toddy cheer ==
The Hotty Toddy cheer is a chant unique to Ole Miss. The cheer is primarily used at Ole Miss sporting events, and is commonly started by cheerleaders, fans, and players. The Ole Miss Band plays the cheer with a drum cadence following the school's fight song, Forward Rebels. The band also plays a version of the cheer put to the tune of "Rock N Roll Part 2” by Gary Glitter, known as "Hey, Go Rebs!". The two-word phrase "Hotty Toddy" is commonly used as a greeting between students, alumni, and fans associated with Ole Miss, similar to the University of Alabama's "Roll Tide" and Auburn University's "War Eagle".

=== Lyrics ===
Are you Ready?
Hell Yeah! Damn Right!
Hotty Toddy, Gosh Almighty,
Who in the hell are we? Hey!
Flim Flam, Bim Bam,
Ole Miss By Damn!

=== History ===
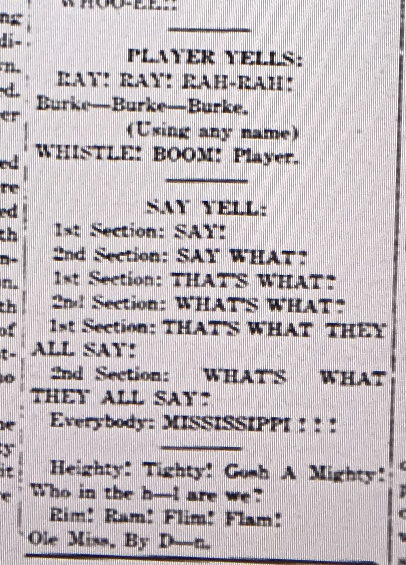
First media appearance of the "Hotty Toddy Cheer", published on The Daily Mississippian, November 19, 1926

The cheer first appeared in print on November 19, 1926, in the student newspaper The Mississippian, now known as The Daily Mississippian. The Hotty Toddy was printed along with all of the popular sports cheers used by the students at the time. However, the lyrics were slightly different from the version used today. The original cheer was printed:

Heighty! Tighty! Gosh A Mighty
Who in the hell are we?
Rim! Ram! Flim! Flam!
Ole Miss By Damn.

Possible Origins

While there are many theories as to where the Hotty Toddy cheer started, the exact origins remain a mystery. Perhaps the leading theory suggests that the cheer was created by the school's cheerleaders or band. The cheer was printed several days before Ole Miss was set to face off against instate rival Mississippi State, who were said to refer to Ole Miss fans as "Hoity-Toitys." Ole Miss had lost thirteen straight games going into the 1926 matchup in Starkville. Prior to the game, Ole Miss held pep rallies on campus and even organized a train to take the students and the newly formed Band to the game. After Ole Miss won the game, the Rebel fans stormed the field and attempted to tear down their goalposts. A brawl ensued between the two schools, and the following season, the Egg Bowl Trophy was introduced to maintain the peace. The iconic game that led to the creation of the Egg Bowl could also have solidified the Hotty Toddy cheer at Ole Miss.

The cheer also appeared in the school's original fight song. According to The Ole Miss Experience, music professor Arleen Tye wrote a fight song for the school in 1931 entitled “Ole Miss.” The song's chorus included “Hi-ty, Ti-ty, Gosh a’mighty, Who the heck are we?”. While the original fight song was discontinued, the school's current fight song, Forward Rebels, includes the Hotty Toddy cheer as well. Some historians believe the Ole Miss Band may have borrowed the cheer from the Virginia Tech Regimental Band, which was nicknamed the, “Highty-Tighties” in 1919

Some other theories suggest that the cheer was fashioned by Ole Miss legendary cheerleader and sports fan, Blind Jim Ivy. Also, it is believed that the alcoholic beverage, Hot Toddy, could be the basis for the cheer.

Hotty Toddy In Pop Culture

Prior to every home football game, Ole Miss plays a video of a celebrity starting the Hotty Toddy cheer. Some of the celebrities that have participated include Russell Crowe, Snoop Dogg, Betty White, Katy Perry, Morgan Freeman, The Robertson Family from Duck Dynasty, Sandra Bullock, Jack Black, and more A variation of the cheer also appeared in the series, Band of Brothers, written as Highty Tighty, Christ Almighty, Who the hell are we? Zim ram, Goddamn, we’re Airborne Infantry.

=== School Songs ===
The school's fight song is "Forward Rebels." It is played by the Ole Miss "The Pride of the South" marching band at official university sporting events.

The song "Dixie" was played by the Ole Miss band for years at athletic events until the University of Mississippi Athletic Department requested to remove the song from the Ole Miss Football and Ole Miss band playlist in 2016.

A modification of the Elvis Presley song "An American Trilogy", now known as "From Dixie with Love" or "Slow Dixie", was also played during football games, both home and away. The song was first played during the halftime performance at the Ole Miss/LSU game of 1980 in Tiger Stadium. Upon its completion, the band received a standing ovation from more than 70,000 people on hand that day. It soon became a staple of the band for many years. During Ole Miss's winning streak of 2003, audiences began chanting "The South will rise again" in place of "His truth is marching on" at the end of the song. The chant remained a staple for the next several years. In 2009, with Ole Miss in the national spotlight for football success, political pressure mounted to do away with the chant. The Student Body Government proposed to call for the chant to be changed to "To Hell with LSU". When this proposal was not enacted, the university asked the band to quit playing the song.

The band also plays a modification of "Dixie" called "Dixie Fanfare."
