= Rebel Black Bear =

University of Mississippi.mascot

Rebel, The Black Bear
- University: University of Mississippi
- Conference: SEC
- Description: Anthropomorphic black bear
- First seen: 2010
- Last seen: 2017
- Related mascot(s): Tony the Landshark, Colonel Reb

Rebel, The Black Bear was the mascot of the Ole Miss Rebels, the collegiate athletic teams of the University of Mississippi. The anthropomorphic black bear replaced Colonel Reb as the official mascot in 2010. On October 6, 2017, Chancellor Jeffrey Vitter announced that the new university mascot would be the Landshark, beginning with the 2018–19 season.

== Mascot search ==
In 2003, Colonel Reb was removed from the sidelines at Ole Miss athletic events as the on-the-field mascot after facing criticism that the character was offensive and racially insensitive. A contest was held in which fans were invited to design a replacement. The athletic department chose two finalists, Rebel Bruiser and Rowdy Rebel, and invited fans to vote on their favorite. The limited fan response prompted the administration to cancel the poll.

=== Admiral Ackbar campaign ===
In 2010, Ole Miss students voted to choose a new mascot. The election did not allow the option of reinstating Colonel Reb as the official mascot, in spite of sizable popular support. An internet campaign to adopt the Star Wars character Admiral Ackbar as the Ole Miss mascot gained considerable support. However, the students that began the campaign insisted Admiral Ackbar was not their ideal choice for the school's mascot. Instead, they intended the character as "the face of a push to start a fresh mascot search at Ole Miss." Lucasfilm, owners of the Admiral Ackbar character, declined to give Ole Miss the rights to use his image for their mascot, but commented, “Lucasfilm is flattered that our Star Wars fans at the University of Mississippi are considering electing Admiral Ackbar as their mascot. The last time we checked in with Admiral Ackbar he was leading the Rebel Alliance Fleet on a critical mission so it will be difficult for him to show up for the games!"

=== Selection process ===
The student committee charged with choosing a new mascot was formed on March 29, 2010. The committee did not set a definitive time to reveal a new on-field mascot, but tentatively scheduled it for the 2010 football season.

The field of suggestions was reduced to eleven candidates: Hotty and Toddy, a black bear, a blues musician, a cardinal, a "fanatic," a horse, a land shark, a lion, the "Mojo," a riverboat pilot, and a titan.

The committee polled University students, faculty, staff, alumni, and season ticket holders about three finalist mascots: the Black Bear, based on the legend that Theodore "Teddy Bear" Roosevelt refused to shoot a bound black bear in Mississippi; the Rebel Land Shark; and Hotty Toddy (essentially a person in a faceless spandex bodysuit with the name derived from the popular Rebel cheer). The committee ultimately selected the Black Bear, named "Rebel," as the new on-field mascot.
