= Brazilian Computer Society =

Brazilian computer science organisation

The Brazilian Computer Society (Portuguese: Sociedade Brasileira de Computação, SBC) was established in 1978, as a scientific and educational organization dedicated to the advancement of computer science in Brazil and the associated technologies and applications. SBC is a leading forum for researchers, students and computing professionals working in the various fields of Computer Science and Information Technology, being the largest computer society in South America.

It is structurally organized as a board of directors, seven regional chapters and a network of 170 institutional representation offices in universities and research institutions throughout Brazil. Research activities are fostered by 27 special interest groups.

== Newton Faller Award ==
The Newton Faller Award is awarded by the SBC to honor members who have distinguished themselves throughout their lives for services to the SBC. The award is exclusive to current members and founders and is delivered during the opening ceremony of the SBC Congress. It is named in memory of Newton Faller (1947–1996), a Brazilian computer scientist and electrical engineer.

Recipients include:

Source: Brazilian Computer Society

- 2019: José Augusto Suruagy Monteiro (UFPE)
- 2018: José Palazzo Moreira de Oliveira (UFRGS)
- 2017: Paulo Roberto Freire Cunha (UFPE)
- 2016: Carlos Eduardo Ferreira (USP)
- 2015: Taisy Silva Weber (UFRGS)
- 2014: Ricardo Augusto da Luz Reis (UFRGS)
- 2013: Ricardo de Oliveiro Anido (UNICAMP)
- 2012: Philippe Alexandre Olivier Navaux (UFRGS)
- 2011: Daltro José Nunes (UFRGS)
- 2010: Therezinha Souza da Costa (PUC-Rio)
- 2009: Roberto da Silva Bigonha (UFMG)
- 2008: Tomasz Kowaltowski (UNICAMP)
- 2006: Luiz Fernando Gomes Soares (PUC-RJ)
- 2004: Flávio Rech Wagner (UFRGS)
- 2001: Siang Wun Song (IME-USP)
- 2000: Cláudia Maria Bauzer Medeiros (UNICAMP)

== CSBC ==
Since 1980, the Congress of the Brazilian Computer Society, or CSBC, has been held annually, promoting the sharing of experiences in the computing area.

In 2022, the CSBC will take place from the 31st of July to the 5th of August and will have its theme, Digital Empowerment: The Role of Computing in Building an Inclusive and Democratic Society.

The event will be held on the premises of the Federal Fluminense University (Universidade Federal Fluminense or UFF) in Niterói, RJ.
