= Southern University Newspapers =

Newspaper organization

Southern University Newspapers (SUN) is an American organization in the United States' southeast focusing on student newspapers, primarily on advertising. Established in 1979, SUN represents 21 schools, from Florida to Virginia. The organization holds an annual conference in Atlanta, Georgia each September at which it bestows awards for outstanding achievements. It also provides training to advertising managers and sales staff for student newspapers.

== Sources ==
- "The Daily Gamecock named regional Newspaper of the Year", University of South Carolina News (November 3, 2008). Retrieved on 2009-06-17.
