= Jeffrey Vitter =

American computer scientist

Jeffrey S. Vitter
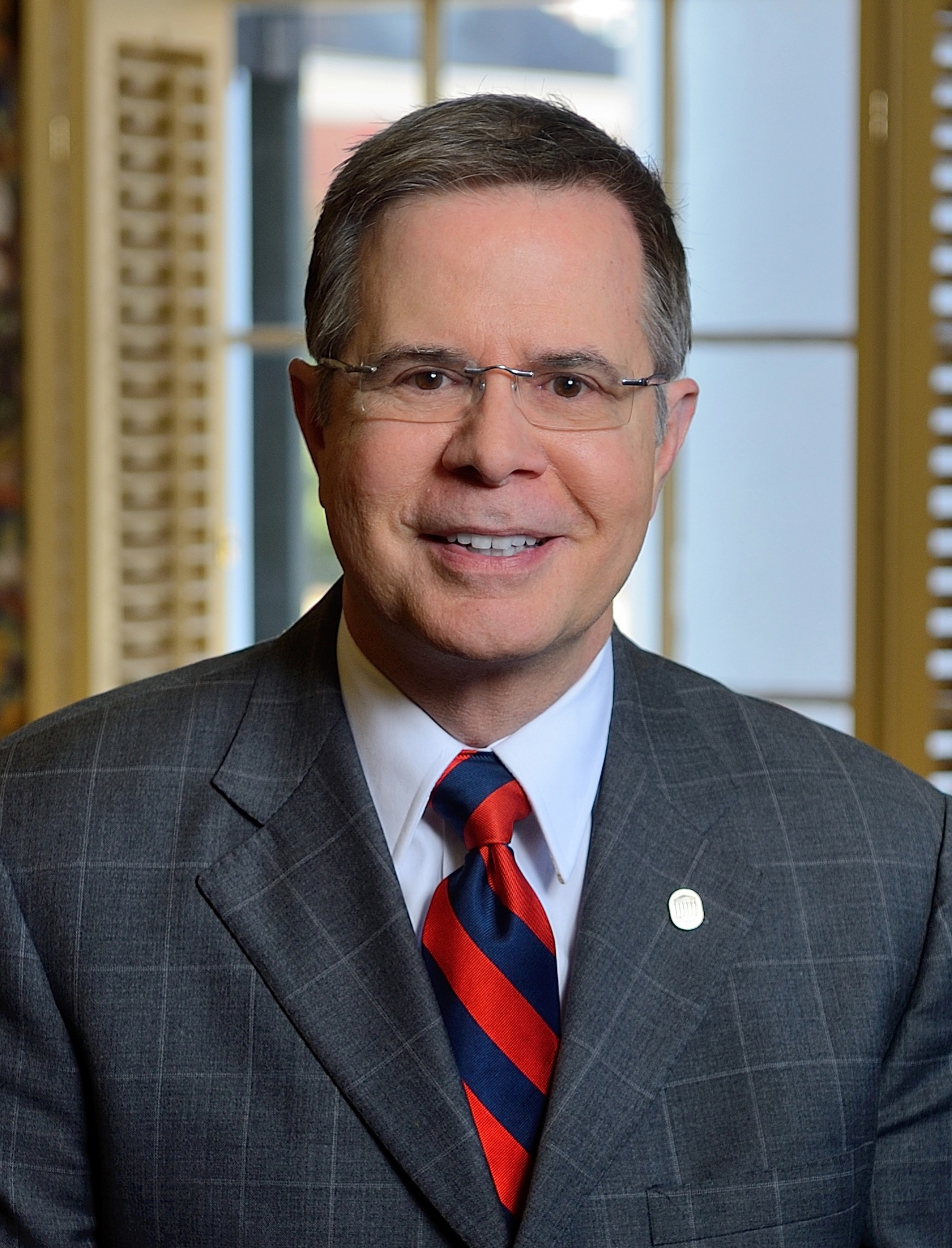

17th Chancellor of the University of Mississippi
- In office January 1, 2016 – January 3, 2019
- Preceded by: Daniel Jones
- Succeeded by: Glenn Boyce

Provost & Executive Vice Chancellor of the University of Kansas
- In office July 1, 2010 – December 31, 2015
- Preceded by: Richard W. Lariviere
- Succeeded by: Neeli Bendapudi

Personal details
- Born: 1955 (age 70–71) New Orleans, Louisiana, US
- Spouse: Sharon
- Children: 3
- Education: University of Notre Dame (BS); Duke University (MBA); Stanford University (PhD)
- Profession: Educator, computer scientist, consultant, genealogist

Jeffrey Scott Vitter is a U.S. computer scientist and academic administrator. Born in 1955 in New Orleans, Vitter has served in several senior higher education administration posts. He is a former chancellor of the University of Mississippi (Ole Miss). He assumed the chancellor position on January 1, 2016. His formal investiture to the chancellorship took place on November 10, 2016, at the University of Mississippi's Oxford Campus.

== Education ==
Vitter was born and raised in New Orleans, Louisiana. He earned a Bachelor of Science in mathematics with highest honors from the University of Notre Dame in 1977, a Ph.D. in computer science from Stanford University under the supervision of Donald Knuth in 1980 and a master of business administration from Duke University in 2002.

== Career ==
From 1980 to 1992, Vitter was a faculty member in the Department of Computer Science at Brown University in Providence, Rhode Island. He moved to Duke University in 1993 as professor and chair of the Department of Computer Science, and as Gilbert, Louis, and Edward Lehrman Professor. From 2002 to 2008, Vitter was the Frederick Hovde Dean of the College of Science at Purdue University in West Lafayette, Indiana.

Vitter served at Texas A&M University in College Station, Texas as provost and executive vice president for academics from 2008 to 2009. He also oversaw A&M's campus in Doha, Qatar. From 2010 to 2015, Vitter was provost and executive vice chancellor and Roy A. Roberts Distinguished Professor at the University of Kansas in Lawrence, Kansas. As provost, Vitter was the chief academic and operations officer for the Lawrence and Edwards campuses.

Vitter spent sabbatical leaves at the Mathematical Sciences Research Institute in Berkeley, CA; INRIA in Rocquencourt, France; Ecole Normale Supérieure in Paris; Bell Laboratories in Murray Hill, New Jersey; Aarhus University in Aarhus, Denmark, and INRIA in Sophia Antipolis, France.

In 2015, Vitter was named as the chancellor of the University of Mississippi in Oxford, Mississippi, starting as chancellor and Distinguished Professor of Computer & Information Science in 2016. One of his first actions was to an advisory committee to address Confederate names and memorials on campus; based on the committee's report, he led efforts to rename or add context to many of these. He also pushed to remove the name of a donor from a university school in response to racist online posts by the donor. Academically, he led the university to attain R1 university status, a classification reflecting a high level of research activity. In 2019, Vitter stepped down as chancellor, returning to a regular faculty position. The Daily Mississippian, the student newspaper, characterized his tenure as chancellor as a time of both significant campus construction and "cultural transition", including efforts to enhance diversity and inclusiveness. He retired in 2020 as Distinguished Professor Emeritus; he continues to work as a consultant and hold an adjunct professorship at Tulane University in New Orleans, Louisiana.

== Academic interests ==
Vitter is a computer scientist with over 350 books, journals, and conference publications, primarily on the design and mathematical analysis of algorithms dealing with big data and data science. His Google Scholar h-index is in the 70s, and he is an ISI highly cited researcher. He helped establish the field of I/O algorithms (a.k.a. "external memory algorithms") as a rigorous area of active investigation. He has made fundamental contributions in databases; compressed data structures and indexing; data compression, including adaptive Huffman coding, arithmetic coding, image compression, and video compression; hashing and search data structures; randomized algorithms; sampling and random variate generation; prediction and machine learning; and average-case complexity.

== Honors and awards ==
Vitter is a Fellow of the National Academy of Inventors (NAI) (class of 2018), a Fellow of the American Association for the Advancement of Science (AAAS) (2009), a Fulbright Scholar (1998), a Fellow of the Association for Computing Machinery (ACM) (1996), a Fellow of the Institute of Electrical and Electronics Engineers (IEEE) (1993), a John Simon Guggenheim Memorial Foundation Fellow (1986), a National Science Foundation (NSF) Presidential Young Investigator Awardee (1985), and a member of Phi Kappa Phi (2017), Sigma Xi (1983), and Phi Beta Kappa (1977).

== Personal ==
Vitter and his wife Sharon Weaver Vitter have three children: Jillian, J. Scott Jr. and Audrey. He is a brother of former U.S. Senator David Vitter of Louisiana and brother-in-law of United States District Court judge Wendy Vitter.
