= Colonel Reb =

Former athletic mascot of University of Mississippi

- Ole Miss "Colonel Rebel" logo
- University: University of Mississippi
- Conference: SEC
- First seen: 1937
- Last seen: 2010

Colonel Reb was the official mascot of Ole Miss Rebels, the collegiate athletic teams of the University of Mississippi ("Ole Miss") in Oxford, Mississippi. Designed in 1936, the Colonel served as the teams' official sideline mascot from 1979 until 2003. The university replaced him in 2010 with a new on-field mascot, the Black Bear, who was replaced with Tony the Landshark in 2018.

== Origin ==
James "Blind Jim" Ivy (1872-1955), possible inspiration for Colonel Reb

Several theories exist as to who originally designed Colonel Reb, a cartoonish, older-aged colonel. One theory proposes that Billy Hix, the art editor for the 1936-1937 Ole Miss yearbook in which the Colonel first appeared, created the image as an illustration for the university's new athletics sobriquet. Another theory postulates that the student group responsible for publishing The Rebel humor magazine designed the Colonel, as this group–known as the "Rebel Club"–was founded in 1937 shortly after the University adopted the "Rebels" nickname and featured on the magazine's masthead an illustration of the Colonel was identical to the one found in the 1937 annual. Still others maintain that the printing company that published the Ole Miss annual was responsible for the design.

University of Mississippi historian David Sansing has noted that "Blind Jim [Ivy] may have been the model for Colonel Rebel," citing the late Frank Everett, Jr., a Mississippi historian and prominent alumnus (B.A. '32, LLB '34) of the university.

Ivy, blinded as a teenager while working with tar on the Tallahatchie Bridge, originally made his way to Oxford in 1896 and became a peanut vendor. During a baseball game between Ole Miss and the University of Texas, a student told Ivy that Mississippi was losing badly. At that point, “Ivy began cheering the home team on in his famous loud booming voice. The team was strangely inspired by Mr. Ivy’s enthusiastic cheering, and won the game decisively.” From that point on, “Blind Jim” became a campus fixture at the University for the next sixty years, known to tell others that he had "never seen Ole Miss lose."

Ivy was very much a part of the university scene when the editor of the school newspaper, The Mississippian, proposed a contest in April 1936 to produce a new nickname for the Ole Miss athletic teams. Prior to this, the teams had been called by various names–the Red and Blue, the Oxfords, the Mighty Mississippians, the Southerners, the Crimson and Blue–and most recently and most popularly up until 1936, the Flood. The Mississippian received many entries and subsequently placed several names–including Rebels, Raiders, Confederates, Stonewalls, and Ole Miss (without a nickname appendage)–in the hands of 21 sportswriters. Ultimately, "Rebels" was the choice of 18 out of the 21 sportswriters, a nickname alluding to the University Greys. After five months of contest and polling, the university's athletics committee formally approved the name, and its sports teams have been known as the Rebels ever since. The look of the Colonel has been modified several times since those early years, however. The 1941-1942 Ole Miss features a depiction of Colonel Reb that looks much more like the well-known image that is used to this day. The earliest and most widely recognized version of the “modern” Colonel, however, appeared on the 1946-1947 Ole Miss, adorning the cover in full color and in much more detail. Ole Miss campus bookstore owner Carl Coers and famous New Orleans cartoonist John Churchill Chase may have also had a hand in revising and modifying the Colonel image during those early years. The California company Angelus Pacific also claims that it designed the Colonel; during this era, ex-Disney artist Art C. Evans illustrated dozens of collegiate mascots that became hugely popular across America and are still widely recognizable today.

== Colonel Reb on Campus ==
=== Honorary Title ===
In 1940, Ole Miss students began voting for "Colonel Rebel" as the highest honorary position for male students on campus (not to be confused with the mascot). This title had previously been called "The King of Mardi Gras," but this name was changed by the Associated Student Body executive council in the fall of 1939. This distinction was made in addition to the female equivalent ("Miss Ole Miss"), which had been bestowed upon female students on campus for over a decade. Several distinguished Ole Miss alumni have been elected to one of these two positions, including former University of Mississippi Chancellor Robert Khayat. In 1975, former National Football League standout Ben Williams became the first black student to be elected "Colonel Reb." "Gentle Ben", as he is affectionately known by many in the Ole Miss community, was also the first black football player at Ole Miss. In 1989, star Ole Miss women's basketball player Kimsey O'Neal became the first black student to gain the title "Miss Ole Miss." One year later, in 1990, Roy Lee "Chucky" Mullins, the Rebel athlete who suffered a devastating football injury in 1989 that left him a quadriplegic, was elected "Colonel Reb" by the student body.

In 2013, the Associated Student Body at the University officially changed the name of this honorary title from "Colonel Reb" to "Mr. Ole Miss."

=== Mascot ===
As was the trend among many American colleges and universities during the 1970s, the university adopted a costumed mascot, based on its popular "Colonel Rebel" design. Thus, in 1979, Colonel Reb advanced from his 40-year history on paper to a living caricature on the field. The role was filled by a male cheerleader, and the character was first called "Johnny Reb." Throughout the early 1980s, the Ole Miss cheerleading team gained widespread recognition as one of the "top squads" in the nation: the Colonel was named "Best Mascot in the S.E.C." in his first year, and he also helped lead the Rebels to third- and first-place distinctions by the National Cheerleading Association ("NCA") and the Universal Cheerleading Association ("UCA"), respectively, among 99 competing universities. The Colonel was also on hand to welcome former President Gerald Ford when he visited the University of Mississippi in 1981.

For a brief period during the early 1980s, the Colonel also joined members of the Rebel cheerleading squad in traveling to several NBA games to perform at halftime shows, in which the group would use mini-trampolines and perform flashy, acrobatic slam-dunks and other basketball stunts. (This group, which featured Colonel Reb in its earliest performances, was originally known as the "Dixie Daredevils," but it eventually rebranded as the "Bud Light Daredevils" after obtaining a sponsorship from Budweiser.)

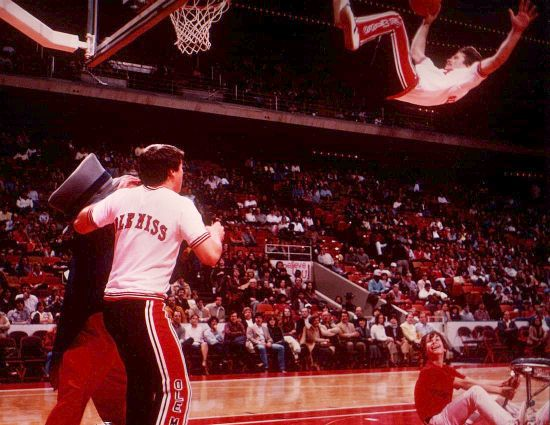
Colonel Reb performs with fellow Ole Miss cheerleaders during halftime of a Houston Rockets basketball game

The Colonel would continue to turn in strong performances throughout the 1980s: in 1986, he earned "SEC Mascot of the Year" honors and was named the Runner-Up for "National Mascot of the Year" (finishing only behind Cocky of the South Carolina Gamecocks). During that same year, he was also honored as the "National Mascot Fundraiser Champion" for his fundraising efforts for juvenile diabetes research and charitable appearances for United Way.

== Mascot search ==
In 2003, the administration–concerned about some members of the public who perceived a connection between the character and the Old South–removed Colonel Reb from the sidelines at Ole Miss athletic events as the official on-field mascot, though he was allowed at tailgates and other unofficial university functions. A contest was held in which fans were invited to design a replacement. The athletic department chose two finalists, Rebel Bruiser and Rowdy Rebel, and encouraged fans to vote on their favorite. The limited fan response, as well as ridicule from fans of rival schools, prompted the administration to cancel the poll.

In 2010, the University announced it would establish a student committee to choose a new mascot for the school's teams. A website was then established by the committee in an effort to promote transparency throughout the process. After months of analyzing responses and feedback, including the final poll, the committee ultimately selected the Black Bear as the new on-field mascot and named it "Rebel".

The Colonel Reb Foundation, a student group founded in support of reinstating Colonel Reb as the university's mascot, has sponsored the unofficial appearances of the mascot in The Grove on game day. The University has reclassified the Colonel Reb trademark as historical.
