= Oxford-University Transit =

Bus transport service in Oxford, Mississippi

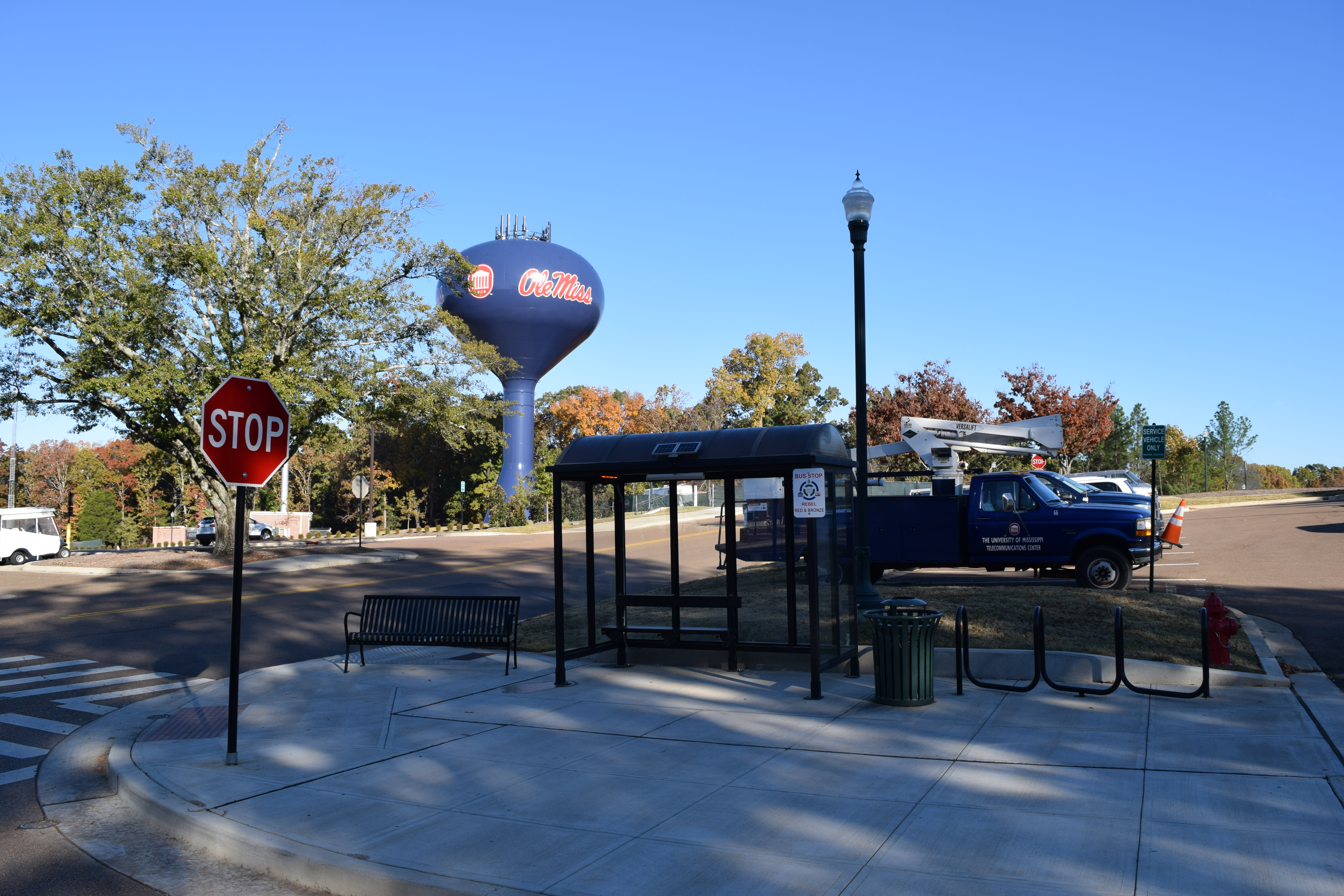
- An OUT bus stop on the campus of the University of Mississippi

Overview
- Locale: Oxford, Mississippi
- Transit type: Transit bus, paratransit
- Annual ridership: 758,480 (2024)
- Website: Official website

Operation
- Began operation: October 20, 2008
- Operator: RATP Dev

Oxford-University Transit (OUT) is a public transit system based in the city of Oxford in the U.S. state of Mississippi. Included in its service area is the University of Mississippi, the state's largest university by enrollment. The system was established in 2008 and provides fixed route bus service as well as paratransit service.

== Services ==
=== Ridership ===
The service's annual ridership peaked in 2018, when it reached nearly 1.4 million annual unlinked trips per the Federal Transit Administration. Since the COVID-19 pandemic, ridership rates have taken a hit and have not returned to their pre-pandemic levels. In 2024, OUT served 758,480 riders.

=== Routes ===
Oxford-University Transit currently has 4 city routes, 6 campus shuttle routes, and 7 student housing routes. Each route has a driver that does the morning shift, and then around 1-1:30 in the afternoon, they end their shift for the day as the afternoon shift drivers take over. The buses typically run from 6:30 in the morning to 9:00 in the evening.

Blue West This route was created to serve the West Jackson Avenue part of Oxford. It begins its route at the Square Parking Garage and then picks up and drops off passengers at the Student Union. After that, it services Jackson Avenue and Walmart before making a second stop on campus at the Kennon Observatory. From there, it goes down University Avenue by the University Museum back to the Square to get to the Parking Garage.

Grey This route has undergone changes throughout the years. It was initially created to provide service to the fast-growing Sisk Avenue and Oxford Commons area; two of the city's public schools, Della Davidson Elementary School and Oxford High School, are located in this area. It later also served areas on North Lamar Blvd, such as The Lamar condominium complex. It now services the Square Parking Garage, the Oxford East Shopping Center, Brittany Woods, and the Oxford Commons area.

Red North This route has long been the primary route for North Oxford. It begins at the Square Parking Garage and covers North Lamar Blvd, Molly Barr Road, and also drops off and picks up passengers at the Student Union on campus.

Red South Red South is the primary bus route for South Lamar Blvd. It previously also served areas along Highway 7 South such as Communicare and the North Mississippi Regional Center, but it now strictly serves South Lamar. The route has undergone some changes in the last few years, such as no longer providing service to the Square Parking Garage as of September 2026. It currently services areas in and around South Lamar Blvd and South Oxford, including the Children's Dental Center, Saddle Creek, the South Oxford Center, and the Baptist Memorial Hospital. It also services apartments along Frontage Road such as Cambridge Station, Autumn Ridge, and The Park before dropping off passengers at the Kennon Observatory on campus.

Red SRC Express and Blue SRC Express These two routes provide service to the South Campus Recreation Center parking lot, the University of Mississippi School of Law, and the Kennon Observatory.

Gold The Gold line provides service to the South Lot (one of the university's student parking lots), the Oxford campus of Northwest Mississippi Community College, and the South Oxford Center.

Bronze The Bronze line provides service to the Jackson Avenue Center parking lot. Pickup and drop-off locations on campus on this route are the Paris-Yates Chapel and the ROTC building next door to the Student Union. This route is typically one of the busiest routes during the day, as many students with Commuter Red parking passes often park at the Jackson Avenue Center and ride this bus to campus.

South Lot Express This route, previously known as Gold Express, provides a shuttle service to the South Lot for students that park there.

Green The Green route is one of two routes that provides service to apartment complexes along Old Taylor Road and Oxford Way, as well as the South Campus Recreation Center. It serves the SCRC, the Flatts at South Campus, Taylor Oaks, Archive Oxford, The Domain at Oxford, The Azul, Fleur De Lis, and Taylor Bend. It also picks up and drops off passengers at the Kennon Observatory on campus.

Hathorn Express The Hathorn Express provides service to Campus Walk and The Quarters, which are the primary apartment complexes along Hathorn Road and Creekmore Blvd. It also transports passengers to the Kennon Observatory.

Orange The Orange route is the primary route for West Oxford and Thacker Road. It provides service to The Links and The Greens apartment complexes, as well as Walmart and the Kennon Observatory.

Brown The Brown route, also known as Brown North, is the primary Anderson Road, Anchorage Road, and College Hill route. It starts at the Student Union and serves apartment complexes along Anderson Road, including the Rev on Anderson, Lark Oxford, and Redpoint Oxford. It also serves cottage complexes along these roads, including Acadia on Anchorage Road and Clearbrook, Greystone Pointe, Old Sardis Place, Creekwood, and Cotton Creek on Old Sardis/College Hill Road.

Brown Express Brown Express provides service to all Anderson Road and Heritage Drive apartment complexes, including the Rev, Lark Oxford, Redpoint Oxford, and Lexington Pointe.

Yellow The Yellow route covers McElroy Drive (which is where the Oxford-University Transit office is located), College Hill/Old Sardis Road, and the Keystone Cottages and Condos on Anchorage Road. It also serves the Redpoint Oxford, Lark Oxford, and Lexington Pointe apartment complexes as well as the Student Union.

Silver Silver was previously a route for Oxford-University Transit but it was discontinued after 2020 before being brought back in 2026. It serves the Old Taylor Road portion of the city, with its main stops being the South Campus Recreation Center, the Flatts at South Campus, and the Faulkner Flats Apartment Homes.

=== Former Routes ===
Beginning in August of 2026, Oxford-University Transit announced that the Blue East, Teal, Pearl, and Pearl Express routes would no longer be apart of the fixed route system due to low ridership. Instead, these routes were designated as same-day service Microtransit routes, meaning passengers would need to call the transit office to book their ride.

Blue East Blue East was for a long time the city's primary route for University Avenue and East Oxford, including the Oxford East Shopping Center, Brittany Woods, and Kroger. Beginning in 2025, the Grey route became the new route for Brittany Woods, as Blue East instead serviced areas along Highway 7 South in addition to its stops along University Avenue.

Teal The Teal line was the secondary route for South Lamar Blvd, primarily serving the newer apartment complexes along Farm View Drive/Oxford Way, as well as Hooper Hollow and the Baptist Memorial Hospital. Beginning in 2024, bus stops were added on Frontage Road, and the Teal route began providing service to Cambridge Station, The Park Apartments, and La Quinta Inn. Because of a shortage of drivers in the spring of 2026, this route was combined with Red South, before ultimately being dropped altogether after the end of the school year.

Pearl The Pearl route was created in the fall of 2025 to take over the old Grey route and provide service to the Oxford Commons area and North Lamar. Its main stop was The Pearl (for which it and the Pearl Express route were named after), a newer apartment complex across from the Malco Oxford Commons Cinema.

Pearl Express Pearl Express was essentially a similar route to Pearl, except it went up North Lamar first before going down to the Oxford Commons area and The Pearl. Additionally, while Pearl took passengers to the Student Union on campus, Pearl Express instead took passengers to the Kennon Observatory, which is the other major bus stop at the university.

== History ==
=== Early development ===
Oxford mayor Richard Howorth was among the biggest proponents for bringing a public transit system to the area, despite pushback stemming from Oxford's small population. The University of Mississippi's willingness to partner with the city on the development of OUT helped show the feasibility of the plan, along with the hiring of city planner Tim Akers, who helped develop Jackson Transit System. The system was named Lafayette-Oxford-University Transit, or LOU Transit, and plans were authorized at a March 2008 Oxford Board of Aldermen meeting to purchase six transit buses on state contract, with Mississippi Department of Transportation expect to pay for eighty percent of the cost while the city, county, and university would split the remaining twenty percent.

Shortly after the initial proposal, Lafayette County pulled out of the agreement. Despite the setback, both the city and university agreed to continue developing the transit system, working with transit contractor McDonald Transit Associates. The new Oxford-University Transit named was first coined at a May 6, 2008, board meeting. By July, Mayor Howorth claimed that the OUT system would be ready by October 1 of that year, with a management contract plan with McDonald Transit Associates officially approved. An interlocal agreement between the University of Mississippi and the city of Oxford was signed in August 2008.

The service's buses arrived in September 2008. Later that month, it was announced that OUT would be officially launched on October 20, 2008, with an opening ceremony on October 17. Two routes were announced: the blue route, an east-west line, and the red route, a north-south line. Riders would not be charged fares for the remainder of the year as the system was unveiled.

=== Launch of the service ===
The service, which The Clarion-Ledger dubbed "five years in the making," launched without issue on October 20, 2008, with buses running from 6:20 a.m. to 7 p.m. along the aforementioned two routes. The system, supplemented by federal and MDOT grant money, cost both the city and the university about $80,000 to unveil. Officials believed that at the start of the new year, riders would be charged a $1 fare for each ride, while students and individuals under 18 or over 65 paying 75 cents. Shortly before the launch, the system also announced that it would be purchasing an Americans with Disabilities Act-compliant paratransit vehicle, designed to accommodate individuals with disabilities with on-demand response.

Two months after the service's launch, the OUT governing board voted to keep OUT free for all riders until October 2009.

=== Growth after launch ===
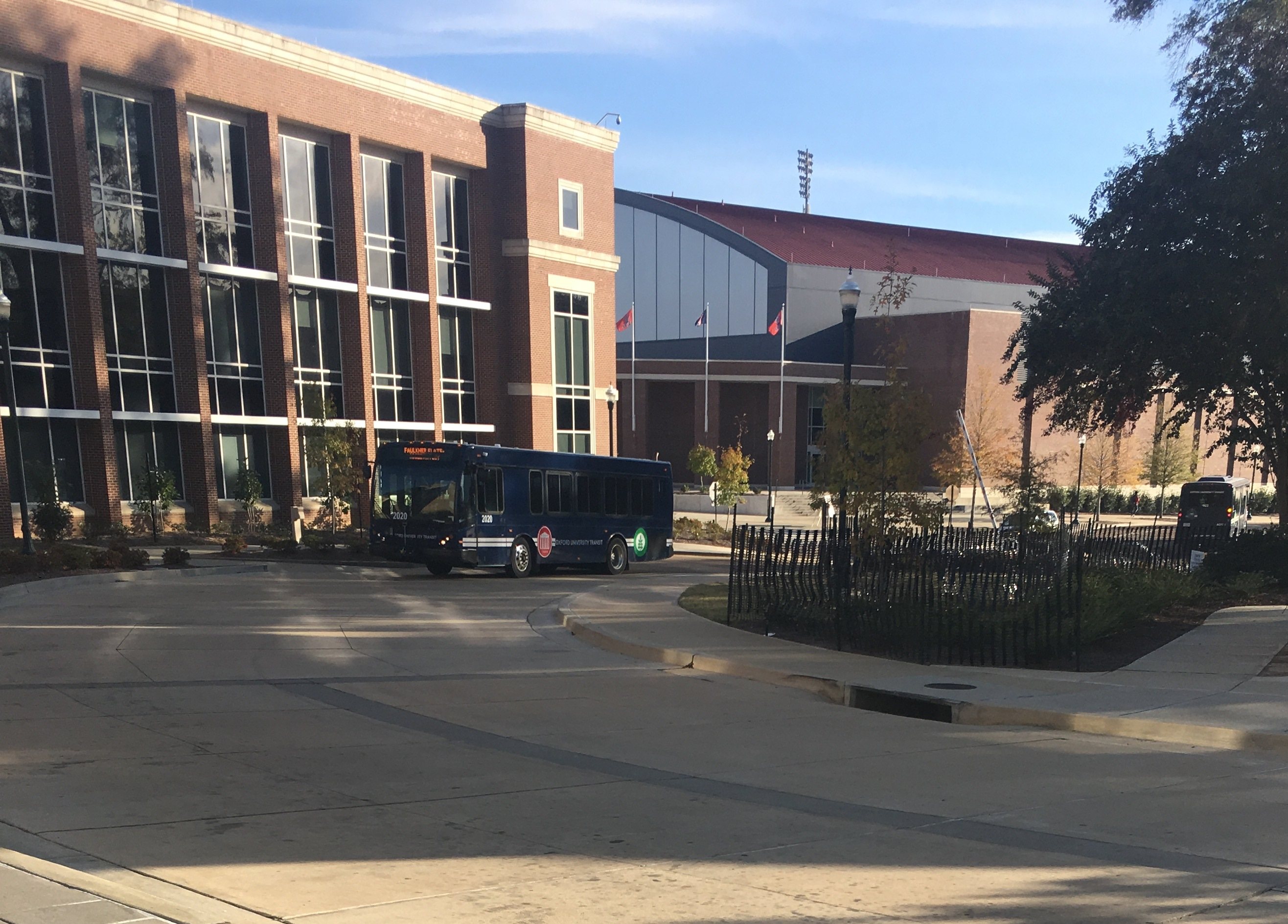
An OUT bus with new navy vinyl wrapping outside Kennon Observatory on UM's campus in 2018

On December 5, 2013, a maintenance and operations facility for OUT, named after Howorth, was opened. Mike Tagert, a member of the Mississippi Transportation Commission representing the North District, called OUT "one of the benchmark public transit systems in (the) state" during the unveiling.

In January 2016, OUT began operating a late-night route for students on Thursdays and Saturdays, dubbed the "Safe Ride" route. Previously, Safe Ride was developed by UM students during the 2013–14 school year in an effort to combat drunk driving. City and university officials believed that providing a regular route with financial backing would increase ridership. In September that year, the OUT commission voted to wrap buses in navy blue vinyl with UM and Oxford city branding.

In August 2019, OUT purchased five buses from British Columbia-based Grande West to help serve its university routes, while also announcing free WiFi availability on all buses by that fall as well.

In January 2020, OUT moved stations along its Silver line into its Green and Old Taylor Road Express lines, while moving one bus each from its Rebel Red and Rebel Blue lines to its Red North and Blue West lines.

=== Post-pandemic ===
After the COVID-19 pandemic, fares for non-students and UM faculty members were dropped, making the service free for all riders. In the lead-up to the 2024 school year, OUT announced it would operate buses on Sunday to accommodate the university's largest-ever freshman class, many of whom had to live off-campus.

== See also ==
- List of bus transit systems in the United States
- Starkville–MSU Area Rapid Transit
