= University of Mississippi =

Public university in Oxford, Mississippi, US

- Motto: Pro scientia et sapientia (Latin)
- Motto in English: "For knowledge and wisdom"
- Type: Public research university
- Established: February 24, 1844; 182 years ago
- Endowment: $1 billion (2025)
- Chancellor: Glenn Boyce
- Students: 27,124
- Location: University, Mississippi, 38677, U.S.
- Colors: Cardinal red and navy blue
- Nickname: Rebels
- Sporting affiliations: NCAA Division I FBS – SEC; PRC
- Website: olemiss.edu

The University of Mississippi (byname Ole Miss) is a public research university in Oxford, Mississippi, United States. The university's medical center is located in Jackson, Mississippi.

The Mississippi Legislature chartered the university on February 24, 1844, and in 1848 admitted its first 80 students. During the Civil War, the university operated as a Confederate hospital and narrowly avoided destruction by Ulysses S. Grant's forces. In 1962, during the civil rights movement, a race riot occurred on campus when segregationists tried to prevent the enrollment of African American student James Meredith. The university has since taken measures to improve its image. The university is closely associated with writer William Faulkner and owns and manages his former Oxford home Rowan Oak, which with other on-campus sites Barnard Observatory and Lyceum–The Circle Historic District, is listed on the National Register of Historic Places.

Ole Miss is classified as "R1: Doctoral Universities – Very high research activity". It is one of 33 institutions participating in the National Sea Grant Program and also participates in the National Space Grant College and Fellowship Program. Its research efforts include the National Center for Physics Acoustics, the National Center for Natural Products Research, and the Mississippi Center for Supercomputing Research. The university operates the country's only federally contracted Food and Drug Administration (FDA)-approved cannabis facility. It also operates interdisciplinary institutes such as the Center for the Study of Southern Culture. Its athletic teams compete as the Ole Miss Rebels in the National Collegiate Athletic Association's (NCAA) Division I Southeastern Conference.

The university's alumni, faculty, and affiliates include 27 Rhodes Scholars, 10 governors, 5 US senators, a head of government, and a Nobel Prize Laureate. Other alumni have received accolades in the arts such as Emmy Awards, Grammy Awards, and Pulitzer Prizes. Its medical center performed the first human lung transplant and animal-to-human heart transplant.

== History ==
=== Founding and early history ===
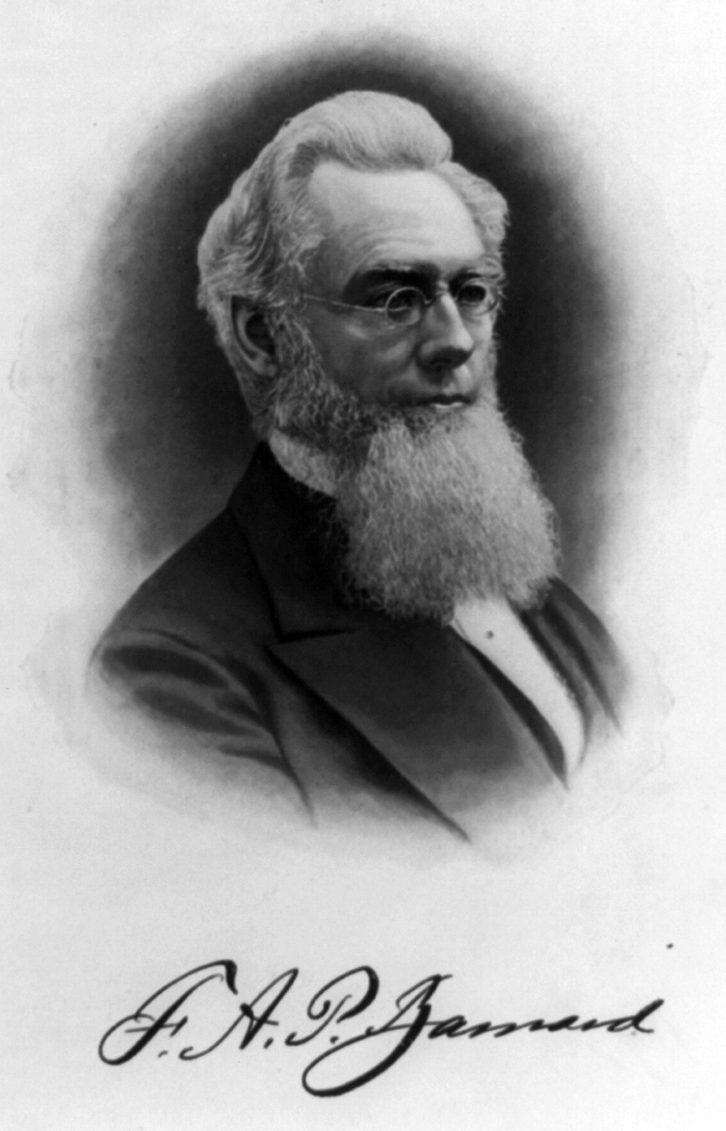
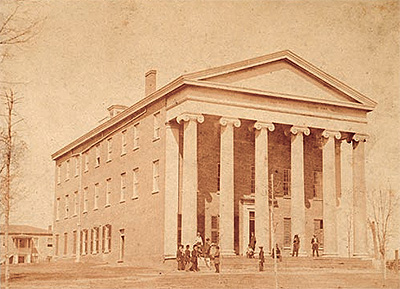
Frederick A. P. Barnard, the last antebellum chancellor, and the Lyceum in 1861

The Mississippi Legislature chartered the University of Mississippi on February 24, 1844. Planners selected an isolated, rural site in Oxford as a "sylvan exile" that would foster academic studies and focus. In 1845, residents of Lafayette County donated land west of Oxford for the campus and the following year, architect William Nichols oversaw construction of an academic building called the Lyceum, two dormitories, and faculty residences. On November 6, 1848, the university, offering a classical curriculum, opened to its first class of 80 students, most of whom were children of elite slaveholders, all of whom were white, and all but one of whom were from Mississippi. For 23 years, the university was Mississippi's only public institution of higher learning, and for 110 years, its only comprehensive university. In 1854, the University of Mississippi School of Law was established, becoming the fourth state-supported law school in the United States.

Early president Frederick A. P. Barnard sought to increase the stature of the university, placing him in conflict with the more conservative board of trustees. His hundred-page 1858 report to the trustees on his proposals resulted in little besides the university head's title being changed to "chancellor". Barnard's northern background—he was born in Massachusetts and graduated from Yale—and Union sympathies resulted in heightened tensions: a student assaulted his slave and the state legislature investigated him. Following the presidential election of Abraham Lincoln in 1860, Mississippi became the second state to secede, with the articles of secession drafted by the university's mathematics professor Lucius Quintus Cincinnatus Lamar. Students organized themselves into a military company called the "University Greys", which merged with the Confederate States Army. Within a month of the Civil War's outbreak, only 5 students remained at the University of Mississippi, and, by fall 1861, the university closed. In its final action, the board of trustees awarded Barnard a doctorate of divinity.

Within six months, Confederates converted the campus into a hospital. It was evacuated in November 1862 as General Ulysses S. Grant's Union forces approached. Although Kansan troops destroyed much of the medical equipment, a lone remaining professor persuaded Grant against burning the campus. (Note: Chancellor Barnard's friendship with General William Tecumseh Sherman may also have helped save the campus.) After three weeks, Grant and his forces left, and the campus returned to being a Confederate hospital. Throughout the war, over 700 wounded died and were buried on campus.

=== Post-Civil War ===
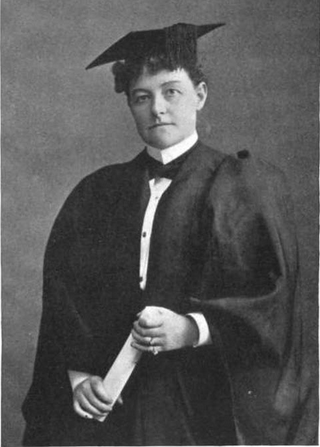
The University of Mississippi was the first college in the Southeast to hire a female faculty member: Sarah McGehee Isom in 1885.

The University of Mississippi reopened in October 1865. To avoid rejecting veterans, the university lowered admission standards and decreased costs by eliminating tuition and allowing students to live off-campus. The student body remained entirely white: in 1870 the chancellor declared that he and the entire faculty would resign rather than admit "negro" students. In 1882, the university began admitting women but they were not permitted to live on campus or attend law school. In 1885, the University of Mississippi hired Sarah McGehee Isom, becoming the first southeastern US college to hire a female faculty member. Nearly 100 years later, in 1981, the Sarah Isom Center for Women and Gender Studies was established in her honor.

The university's byname "Ole Miss" was first used in 1897, when it won a contest of suggestions for a yearbook title. The term originated as a title domestic slaves used to distinguish the mistress of a plantation from "young misses". Fringe origin theories include it coming from a diminutive of "Old Mississippi", or from the name of the "Ole Miss" train that ran from Memphis to New Orleans. Within two years, students and alumni were using "Ole Miss" to refer to the university.

Between 1900 and 1930, the Mississippi Legislature introduced bills aiming to relocate, close, or merge the university with Mississippi State University. All such legislation failed. During the 1930s, the governor of Mississippi Theodore G. Bilbo was politically hostile toward the University of Mississippi, firing administrators and faculty, and replacing them with his friends in the "Bilbo purge". Bilbo's actions severely damaged the university's reputation, leading to the temporary loss of its accreditation. Consequently, in 1944, the Constitution of Mississippi was amended to protect the university's board of trustees from political pressure. During World War II, the University of Mississippi was one of 131 colleges and universities that participated in the national V-12 Navy College Training Program, which offered students a path to a Navy commission.

=== Integration ===
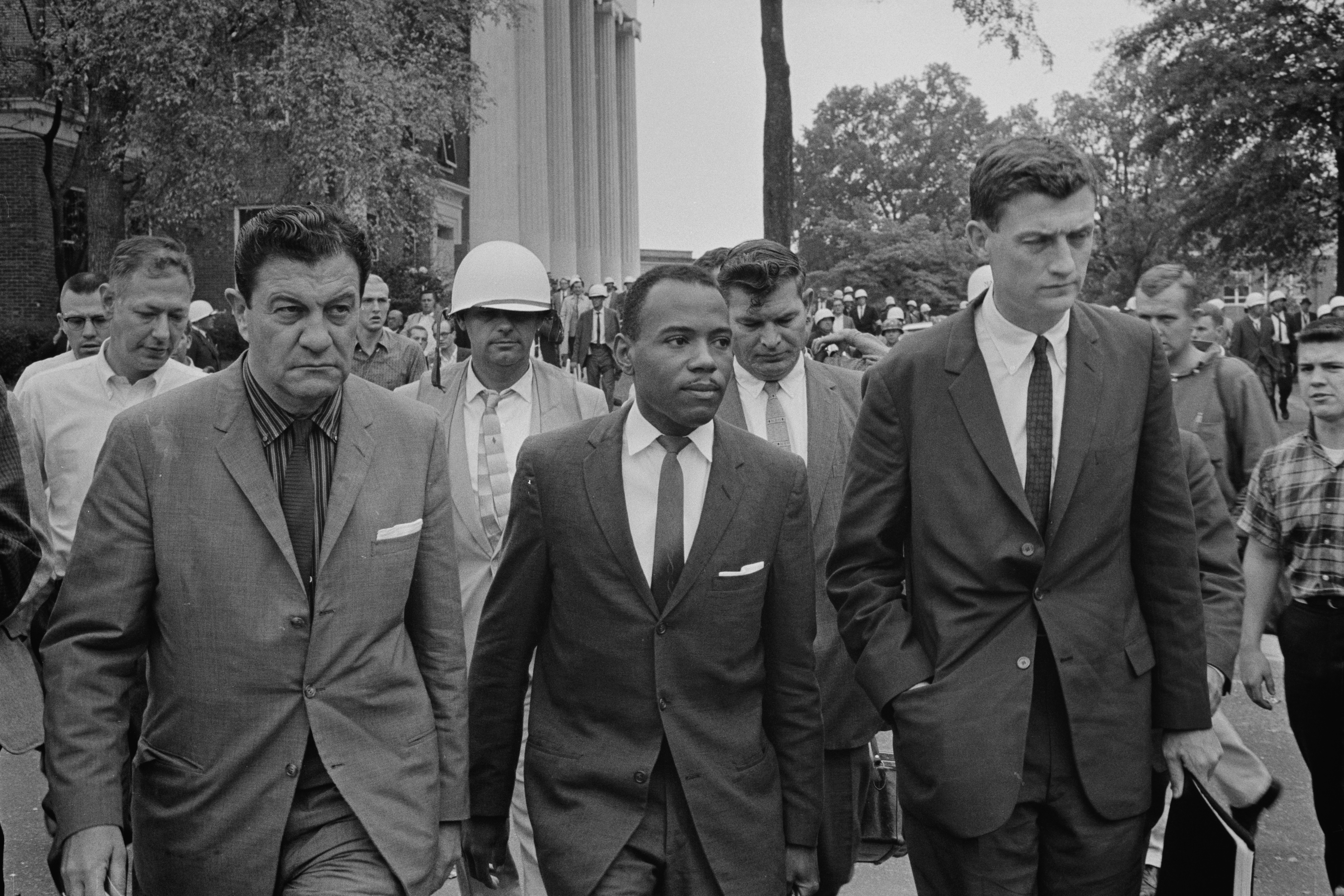
James Meredith accompanied by federal officials on campus

In 1954, the U.S. Supreme Court ruled in Brown v. Board of Education that racial segregation in public schools was unconstitutional. Eight years after the Brown decision, all attempts by African American applicants to enroll at the University of Mississippi had failed. Shortly after the 1961 inauguration of President John F. Kennedy, James Meredith—an African American Air Force veteran and former student at Jackson State University—applied to the University of Mississippi. After months of obstruction by Mississippi officials, the U.S. Supreme Court ordered Meredith's enrollment, and the Department of Justice under Attorney General Robert F. Kennedy entered the case on Meredith's behalf. On three occasions, either governor Ross R. Barnett or lieutenant governor Paul B. Johnson Jr. physically blocked Meredith's entry to the campus.

The United States Court of Appeals for the Fifth Circuit held both Barnett and Johnson Jr. in contempt, and issued fines exceeding $10,000 for each day they refused to enroll Meredith. On September 30, 1962, President Kennedy dispatched 127 U.S. Marshals, 316 deputized U.S. Border Patrol agents, and 97 federalized Federal Bureau of Prisons personnel to escort Meredith. After nightfall, far-right former Major General Edwin Walker and outside agitators arrived, and a gathering of segregationist students before the Lyceum became a violent mob. Segregationist rioters threw Molotov cocktails and bottles of acid, and fired guns at federal marshals and reporters. 160 marshals would be injured, with 28 receiving gunshot wounds, and two civilians—French journalist Paul Guihard and Oxford repairman Ray Gunter—were killed by gunfire. Eventually, 13,000 soldiers arrived in Oxford and quashed the riot. One-third of the federal officers—166 men—were injured, as were 40 federal soldiers and National Guardsmen. More than 30,000 personnel were deployed, alerted, and committed in Oxford—the most in American history for a single disturbance. Meredith enrolled and attended a class on October 1. By 1968, Ole Miss had around 100 African American students, and by the 2019–2020 academic year, African Americans constituted 12.5 percent of the student body.

=== Recent history ===
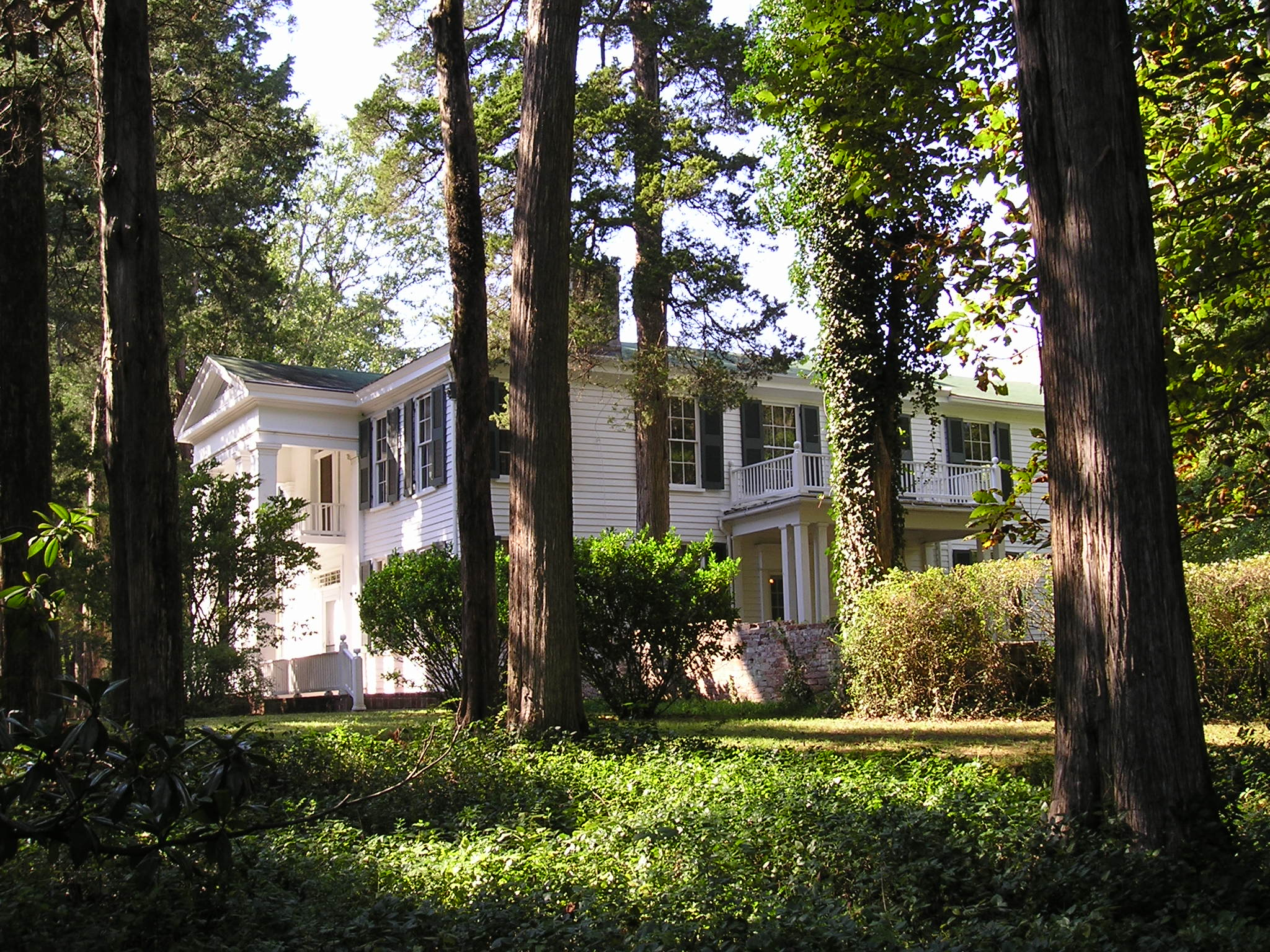
The campus hosts Rowan Oak, former home of Nobel Prize-winning writer William Faulkner and a National Historic Landmark.

In 1972, Ole Miss purchased Rowan Oak, the former home of Nobel Prize–winning writer William Faulkner. The building—a National Historic Landmark—has been preserved as it was at Faulkner's death in 1962. Faulkner was the university's postmaster in the early 1920s and wrote As I Lay Dying (1930) at the university powerhouse. His Nobel Prize medallion is displayed in the university library. The university hosted the inaugural Faulkner and Yoknapatawpha Conference in 1974. In 1980, Willie Morris became the university's first writer in residence.

In 2002, Ole Miss marked the 40th anniversary of integration with a yearlong series of events, including an oral history of the university, symposiums, a memorial, and a reunion of federal marshals who served at the campus. In 2006, the 44th anniversary of integration, a statue of Meredith was dedicated on campus. Two years later, the site of the 1962 riots was designated as a National Historic Landmark. The university also held a yearlong program to mark the 50th anniversary of integration in 2012. The university hosted the first presidential debate of 2008—the first presidential debate held in Mississippi—between Senators John McCain and Barack Obama.

Ole Miss retired its mascot Colonel Reb in 2003, citing its Confederate imagery. Although a grass-roots movement to adopt Star Wars character Admiral Ackbar of the Rebel Alliance gained significant support, Rebel Black Bear, a reference to Faulkner's short story The Bear, was selected in 2010. The Bear was replaced with another mascot, Tony the Landshark, in 2017. Beginning in 2022, football coach Lane Kiffin's dog Juice became the de facto mascot. In 2015, the university removed the Mississippi State Flag, which at the time included the Confederate battle emblem, and in 2020, it relocated a prominent Confederate monument.

== Campus ==
=== Oxford campus ===
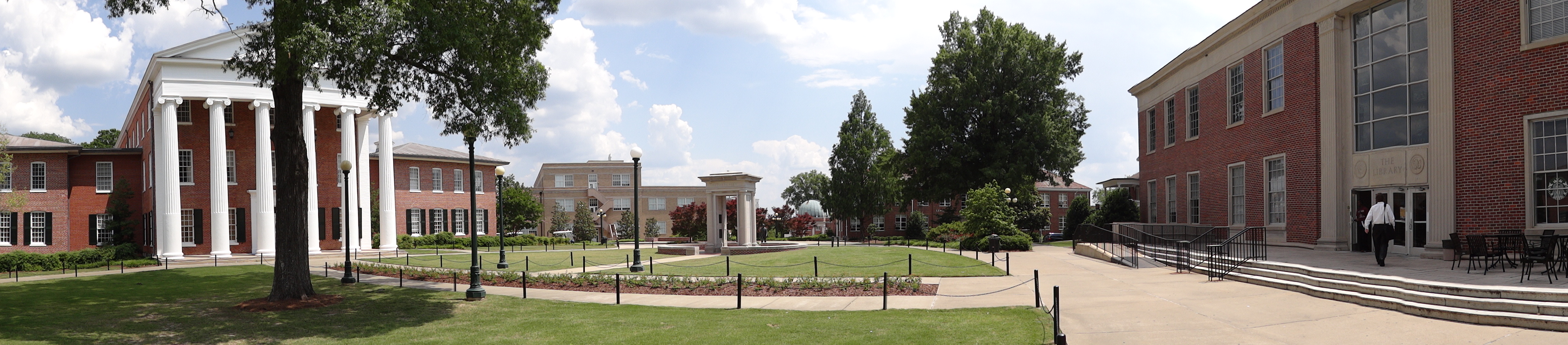
Panoramic view of the courtyard behind the Lyceum (1848)

The University of Mississippi's Oxford campus is partially located in Oxford and partially in University, Mississippi, a census-designated place. The main campus is situated at an altitude of around 500 feet (150 m), and has expanded from one square mile (260 ha) of land to around 1,200 acres (1.9 sq mi; 490 ha). The campus' buildings are largely designed in a Georgian architectural style; some of the newer buildings have a more contemporary architecture.

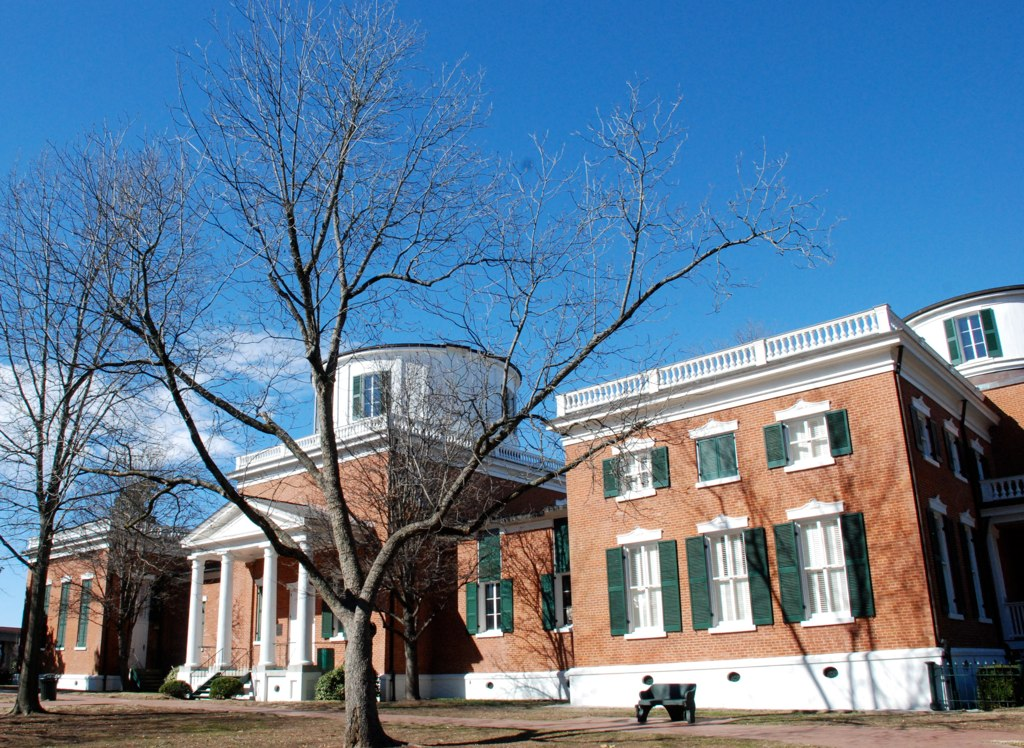
Barnard Observatory (1859) was designed to house the world's largest telescope.

At the campus' center is "The Circle", which consists of eight academic buildings organized around an ovaloid common. The buildings include the Lyceum (1848), the "Y" Building (1853), and six later buildings constructed in a Neoclassical Revival style. The Lyceum was the first building on the campus and was expanded with two wings in 1903. According to the university, the Lyceum's bell is the oldest academic bell in the United States. Near the Circle is The Grove, a 10-acre (4.0 ha) plot of land that was set aside by chancellor Robert Burwell Fulton c. 1893, and hosts up to 100,000 tailgaters during home games. Barnard Observatory, which was constructed under Chancellor Barnard in 1859, was designed to house the world's largest telescope. Due to the Civil War's outbreak, however, the telescope was never delivered and was instead acquired by Northwestern University. The observatory was listed on the National Register of Historic Places in 1978. The first major building built after the Civil War was Ventress Hall, which was constructed in a Victorian Romanesque style in 1889.

From 1929 to 1930, architect Frank P. Gates designed 18 buildings on campus, mostly in Georgian Revival architectural style, including (Old) University High School, Barr Hall, Bondurant Hall, Farley Hall (also known as Lamar Hall), Faulkner Hall, and Wesley Knight Field House. During the 1930s, the many building projects at the campus were largely funded by the Public Works Administration and other federal entities. Among the notable buildings built in this period is the dual-domed Kennon Observatory (1939). Two large modern buildings—the Ole Miss Union (1976) and Lamar Hall (1977)—caused controversy by diverging from the university's traditional architecture. In 1998, the Gertrude C. Ford Foundation donated $20 million to establish the Gertrude C. Ford Center for the Performing Arts, which was the first building on campus to be solely dedicated to the performing arts. As of 2020, the university was constructing a 202,000-square-foot (18,800 m^{2}) STEM facility, the largest single construction project in the campus' history. The university owns and operates the University of Mississippi Museum, which comprises collections of American fine art, Classical antiquities, and Southern folk art, as well as historic properties in Oxford. Ole Miss also owns University-Oxford Airport, which is located north of the main campus.

North Mississippi Japanese Supplementary School, a Japanese weekend school, is operated in conjunction with Ole Miss, with classes held on campus. It opened in 2008 and was jointly established by several Japanese companies and the university. Many children have parents who are employees at Toyota facilities in Blue Springs.

Campus of the University of Mississippi

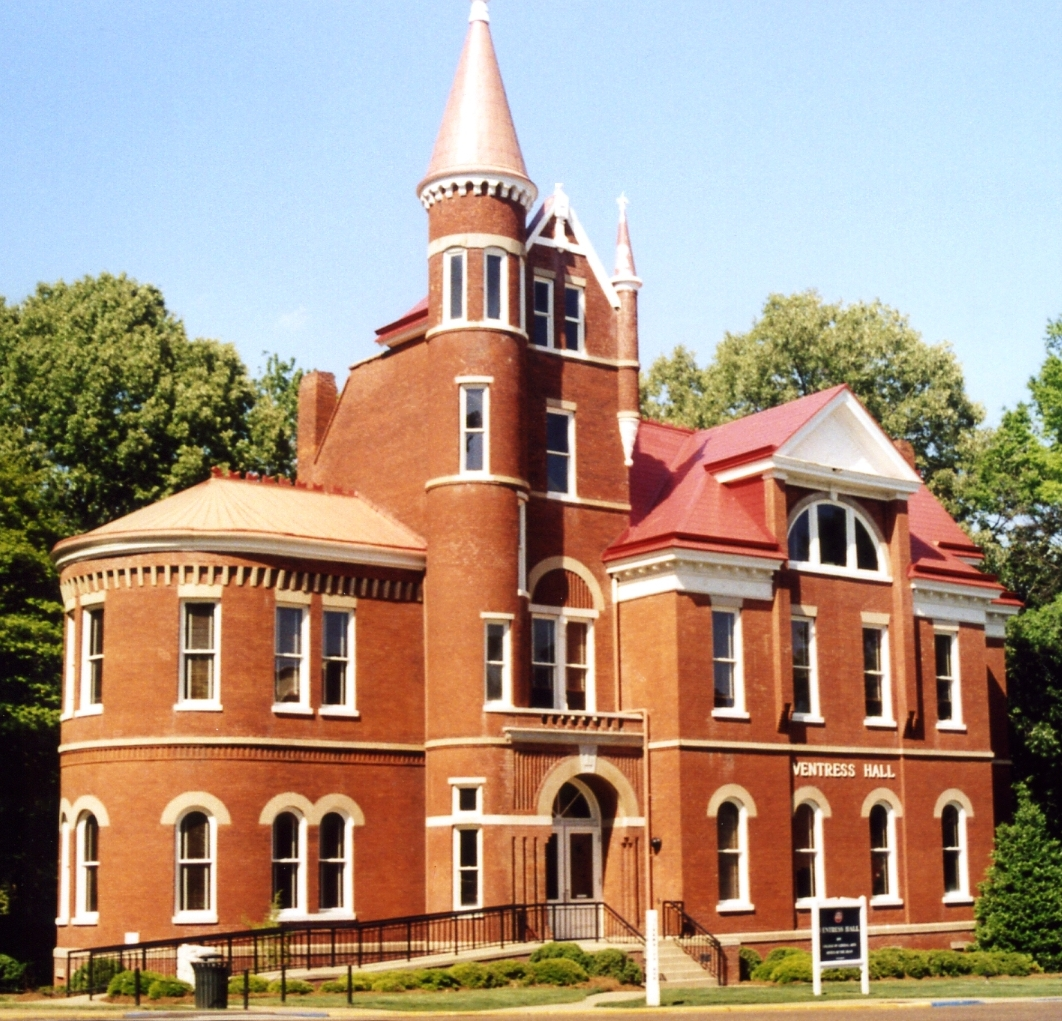
Ventress Hall (1889)

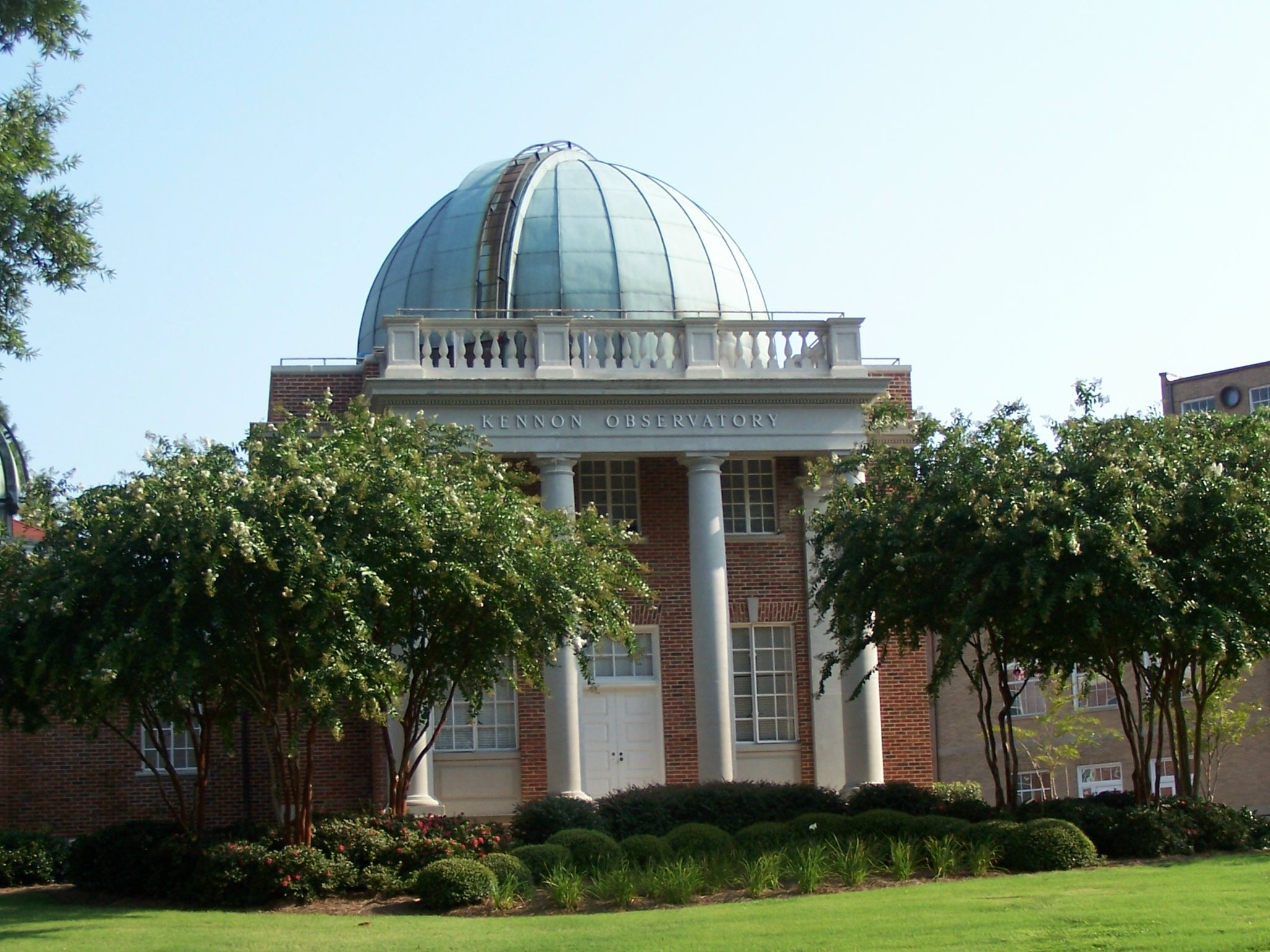
Kennon Observatory (1939)

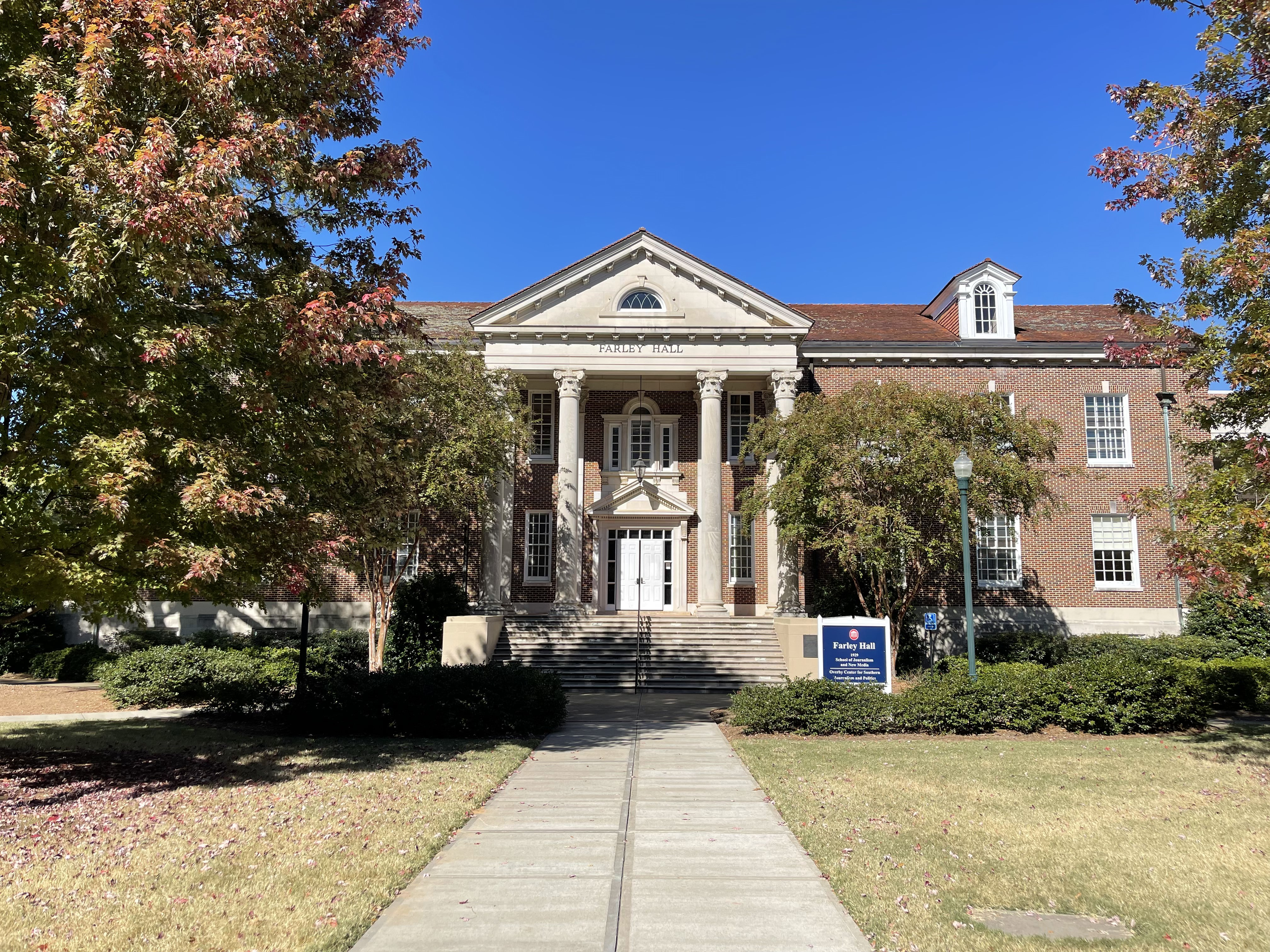
Farley Hall (1929)

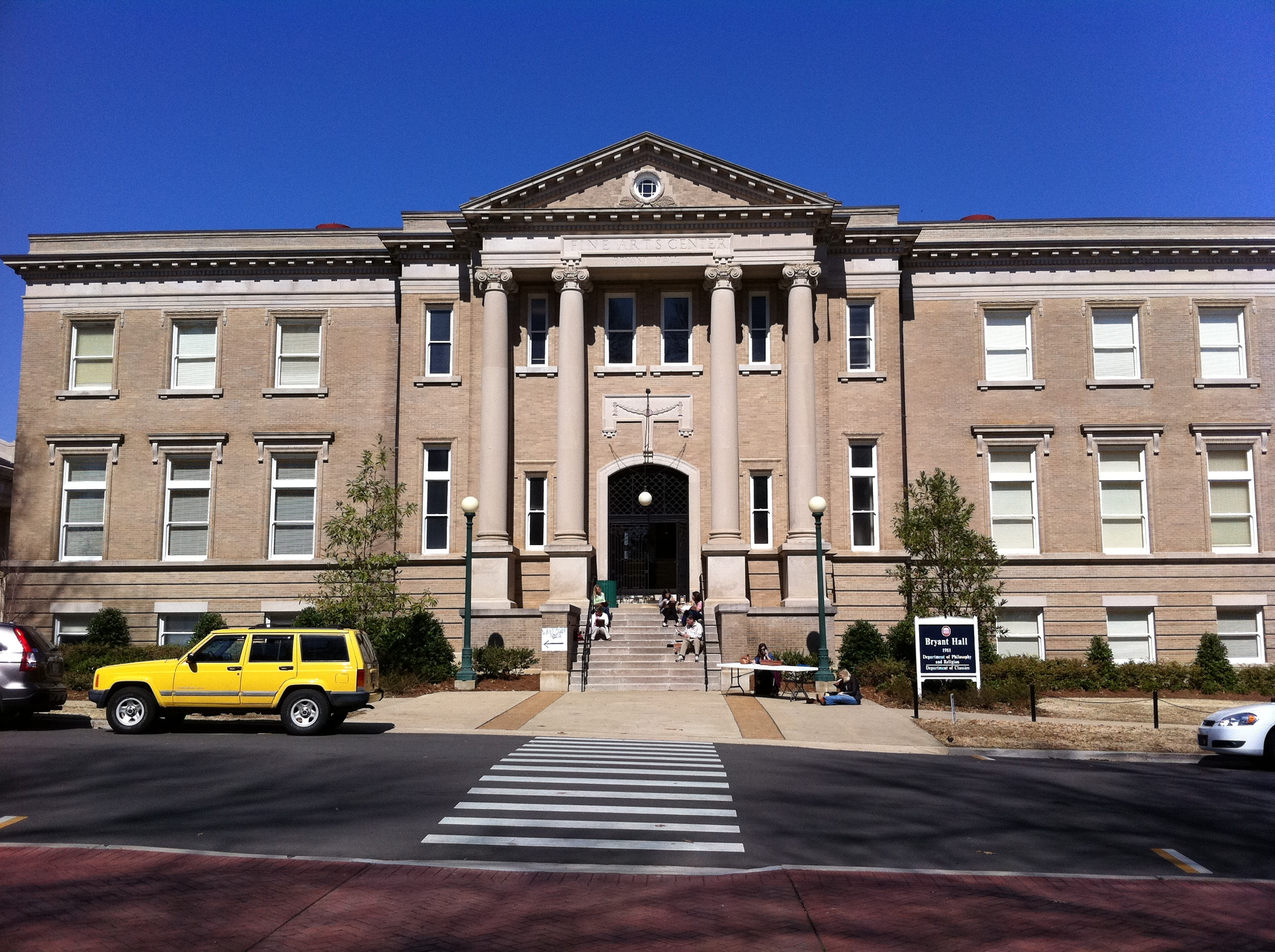
Bryant Hall (1911)

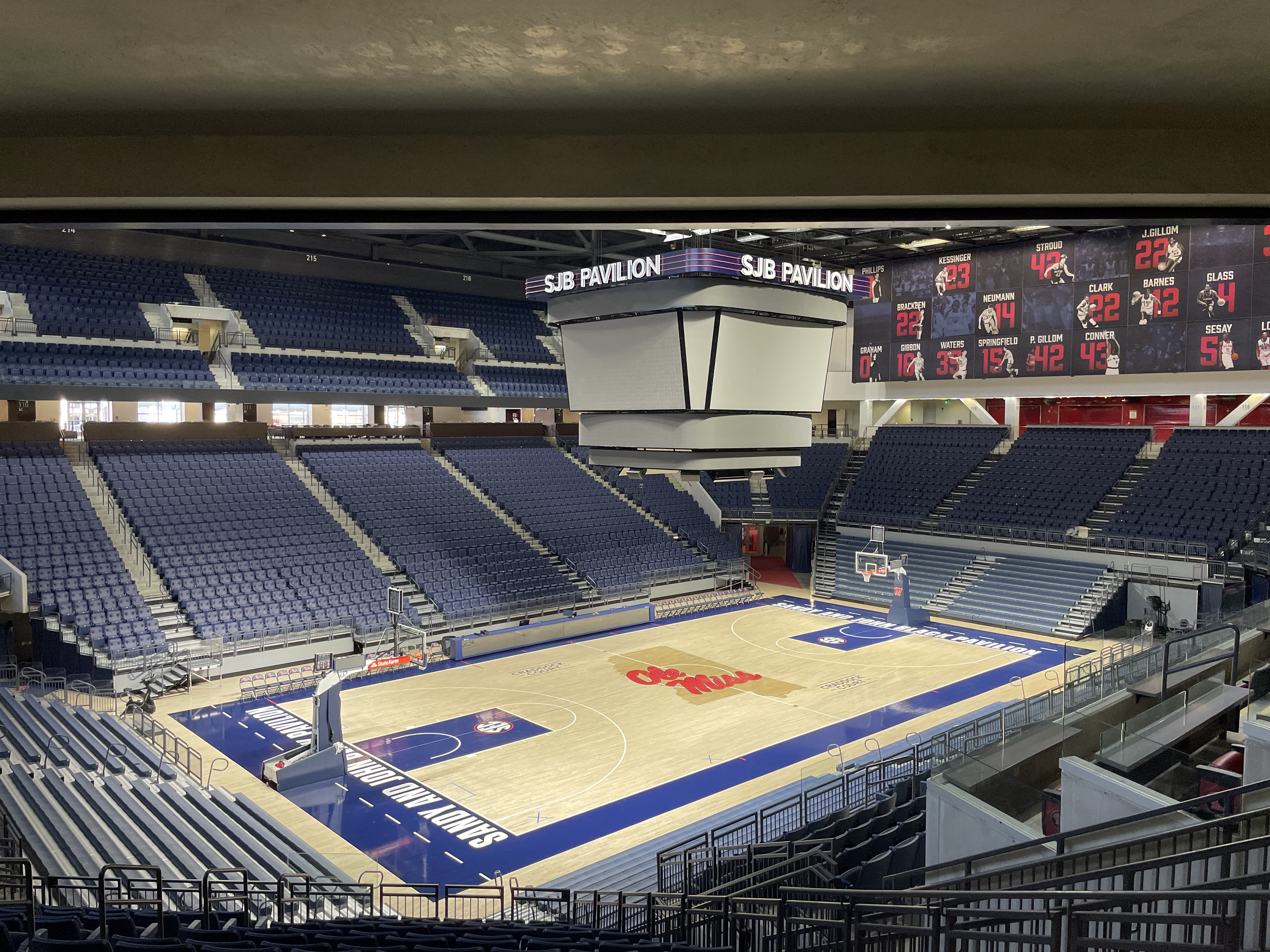
The Sandy and John Black Pavilion (2016)

=== Satellite campuses ===
In 1903, the University of Mississippi School of Medicine was established on the Oxford campus. It offered only two years of medical courses; students had to attend an out-of-state medical school to complete their degrees. This form of medical education continued until 1955, when the University of Mississippi Medical Center (UMMC) was established on a 164-acre (66 ha) site in Jackson, Mississippi, and the School of Medicine was relocated there. A nursing school was established in 1956 and since then, other health-related schools have been added. As of 2021, UMMC offers medical and graduate degrees. In addition to the medical center, the university has satellite campuses in Booneville, DeSoto, Grenada, Rankin, and Tupelo.

== Organization and administration ==
Table featuring schools of the University of Mississippi
School	Founded	Ref.
College of Liberal Arts	1848	
School of Law	1854	
School of Engineering	1900	
School of Education	1903	
School of Medicine	1903	
School of Pharmacy	1908	
School of Business Administration	1917	
School of Journalism and New Media	1947	
School of Nursing	1948	
School of Health Related Professions	1971	
School of Dentistry	1975	
Patterson School of Accountancy	1979	
School of Applied Sciences	2001	
School of Graduate Studies in the Health Sciences	2001	

=== Divisions of the university ===
The University of Mississippi consists of 15 schools. The largest undergraduate school is the College of Liberal Arts. Graduate schools include a law school, a school of business administration, an engineering school, and a medical school.

=== Administration ===
The University of Mississippi's chief administrative officer is the chancellor, a position Glenn Boyce has held since 2019. The chancellor is supported by vice-chancellors who administer areas such as research and intercollegiate athletics. The provost oversees the university's academic affairs, and a dean oversees each school, as well as general studies and the honors college. A faculty senate advises the administration.

The board of trustees of the Mississippi State Institutions of Higher Learning is the constitutional governing body that is responsible for policy and financial oversight of the University of Mississippi and the state's other seven public secondary institutions. the board consists of 12 members, who serve staggered nine-year terms and represent the state's three Supreme Court Districts. The board appoints the commissioner of higher education, who administers its policies.

=== Finances ===
As of April 2021, the University of Mississippi's endowment was $775 million. The university's budget for fiscal year 2019 was over $540 million. Less than 13% of operating revenues are funded by the state of Mississippi, and the university relies heavily on private donations. The Ford Foundation has donated nearly $65 million to the Oxford campus and UMMC.

== Academics ==
The University of Mississippi is the state's largest university by enrollment and is considered the state's flagship university. In 2015, the student-faculty ratio was 19:1. Of its classes, 47.4 percent have fewer than 20 students. The most popular subjects include marketing, education and teaching, accountancy, finance, pharmaceutical sciences, and administration. To receive a bachelor's degree, students must have at least 120 semester hours with passing grades and a cumulative 2.0 GPA.

The university also offers graduate degrees such as PhDs and masters of art, science, and fine arts. The university maintains the Mississippi Teacher Corps, a free graduate program that educates teachers for critical-needs public schools.

Taylor Medals, which were first awarded in 1905, are presented to exceptional students nominated by the faculty. The medals are named in honor of Marcus Elvis Taylor, who graduated in 1871 and are given to less than one percent of each class.

For the 2024–2025 academic year, the middle 50% of enrolled students scored between 1000 and 1200 on the SAT (with a 50th percentile of 1090), with a 50th percentile of 550 on the SAT Evidence-Based Reading and Writing section and a 50th percentile of 540 on the SAT Math section.

=== Research ===
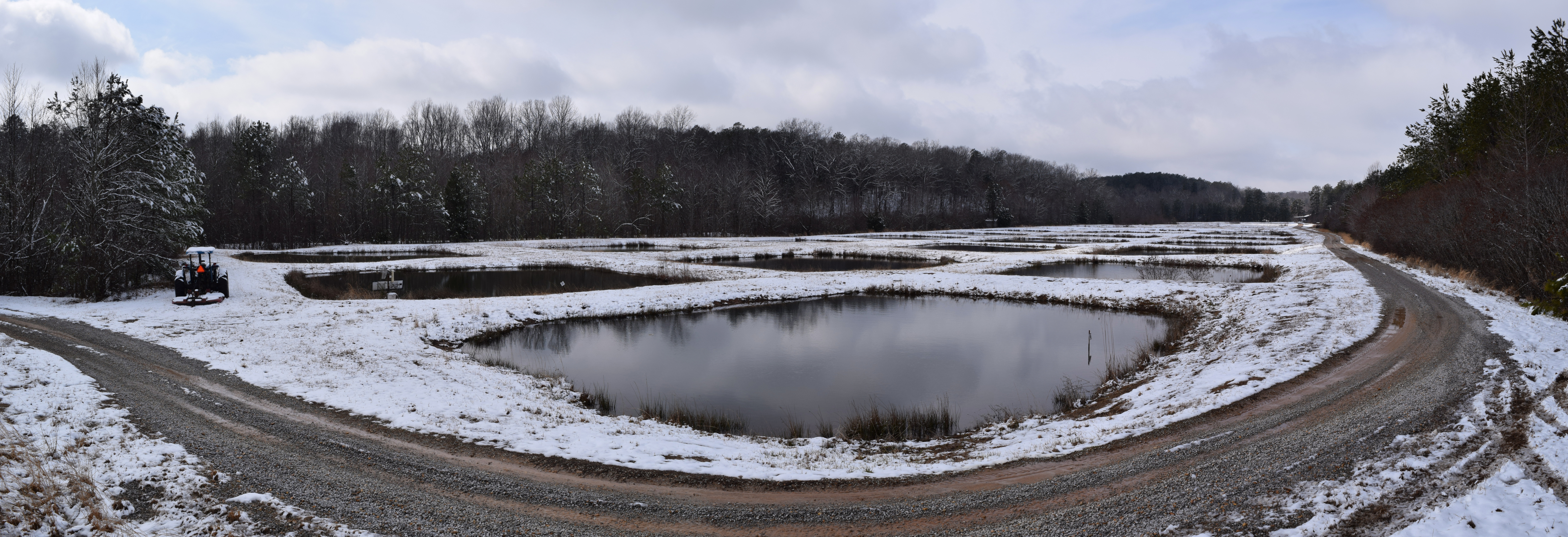
Research ponds at the University of Mississippi Field Station

Ole Miss is classified among "R1: Doctoral Universities – Very high research activity". According to the National Science Foundation, the university spent $137 million on research and development in 2018, ranking it 142nd in the nation. It is one of the 33 colleges and universities participating in the National Sea Grant Program and participates in the National Space Grant College and Fellowship Program. Since 1948, the university has been a member of the Oak Ridge Associated Universities.

In 1963, University of Mississippi Medical Center surgeons, led by James Hardy, performed the world's first human lung transplant, and in 1964 the world's first animal-to-human heart transplant. Because Hardy researched transplantation, consisting of primate studies during the previous nine years, the heart of a chimpanzee was used for the transplant.

In 1965, the university established its Medicinal Plant Garden, which the School of Pharmacy uses for drug research. Since 1968, the school has operated the only legal marijuana farm and production facility in the United States. The National Institute on Drug Abuse contracts to the university production of cannabis for use in approved research studies and for distribution to the seven surviving medical marijuana patients grandfathered into the Compassionate Investigational New Drug program. The facility is the only source of marijuana medical researchers can use to conduct Food and Drug Administration-approved tests.

The National Center for Physics Acoustics (NCPA), which Congress established in 1986, is located on campus. In addition to conducting research, the NCPA houses the Acoustical Society of America's archives. The university also operates the University of Mississippi Field Station, which includes 223 research ponds and supports long-term ecological research, and hosts the Mississippi Center for Supercomputing Research and the Mississippi Law Research Institute. In 2012, the university completed Insight Park, a research park that "welcomes companies commercializing University of Mississippi research".

=== Special programs ===
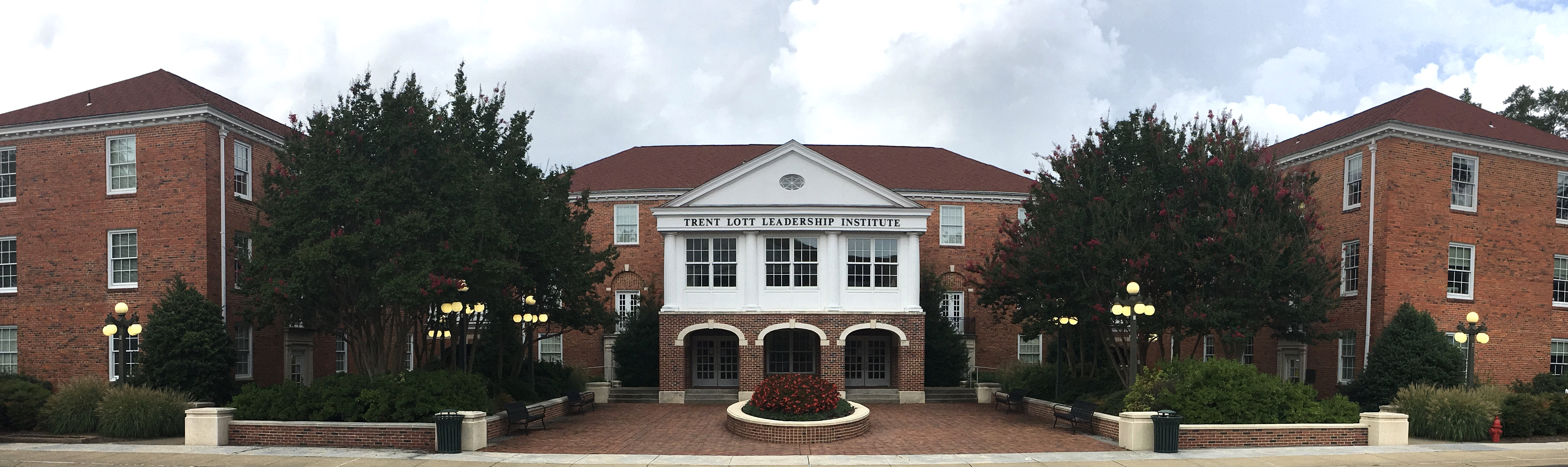
Panoramic view of the Trent Lott Leadership Institute

Honors education at the University of Mississippi, consisting of lectures by distinguished academics, began in 1953. In 1974, this program became the University Scholars Program, and in 1983, the University Honors Program was created and honors-core courses were offered. In 1997, Netscape CEO Jim Barksdale and wife Sally donated $5.4 million to establish the Sally McDonnell Barksdale Honors College (SMBHC), which provides a capstone project—a senior thesis—and endowed scholarships.

In 1977, the university established its Center for the Study of Southern Culture with funding from the National Endowment for the Humanities, which is housed in the College of Liberal Arts. The center provides for interdisciplinary studies of Southern history and culture. In 2000, the university established the Trent Lott Leadership Institute, which is named after alumnus and then-US Senate majority leader Trent Lott. The institute was funded with large corporate donations from MCI Inc., Lockheed Martin, and other companies. In addition to leadership initiatives, the institute offers a BA degree in Public Policy Leadership.

The Center for Intelligence and Security Studies (CISS) delivers academic programming on intelligence analysis and engages in applied research and consortium building with government, private, and academic partners. In 2012, the United States Director of National Intelligence designated CISS as an Intelligence Community Center of Academic Excellence (CAE), becoming one of 29 such college programs in the United States. Other special programs include the Haley Barbour Center for Manufacturing Excellence—established jointly by the university and Toyota in 2008— as well as the Arabic Language Flagship Program and the Chinese Language Flagship Program (simplified Chinese: 中文旗舰项目; traditional Chinese: 中文旗艦項目; pinyin: Zhōngwén Qíjiàn Xiàngmù). The Croft Institute for International Studies, which was founded in 1998, provides the only international studies undergraduate program in Mississippi.

The University of Mississippi is a member of the SEC Academic Consortium, which has since been renamed SECU. The collaborative initiative was designed to promote research, scholarship, and achievement among the member universities in the Southeastern Conference. In 2013, the university participated in the SEC Symposium on renewable energy in Atlanta, Georgia, which was organized and led by the University of Georgia and the UGA Bioenergy Systems Research Institute.

In 2021, actor Morgan Freeman and Professor Linda Keena donated $1 million to the University of Mississippi to create the Center for Evidence-Based Policing and Reform, which aimed to provide law-enforcement training and seek to improve engagement between law enforcement and communities.

=== Rankings and accolades ===
Academic rankings

National
- Forbes: 231
- U.S. News & World Report: 171 (tie)
- Washington Monthly: 304
- WSJ/College Pulse: 278

Global
- U.S. News & World Report: 432 (tie)

In U.S. News & World Report's 2023 rankings, the University of Mississippi was tied for 163rd place among national universities and 88th among public universities. In 2023, Bloomberg Businessweek ranked the professional MBA program at the School of Business Administration #72 nationally, and the online MBA program in the top 25. As of 2018, all three degree programs at the Patterson School of Accountancy were among the top 10 accounting programs according to the Public Accounting Report.

Since 2012, the Chronicle of Higher Education has named the University of Mississippi as one of the "Great Colleges to Work For". In the 2018 results, released in the Chronicle's annual report on "The Academic Workplace", the university was among 84 institutions honored from the 253 colleges and universities surveyed. In 2018, the university's campus was ranked the second-safest in the SEC and one of the safest in the U.S.

As of 2019, the university has had 27 Rhodes Scholars. Since 1998, it has 10 Goldwater Scholars, seven Truman Scholars, 18 Fulbright Scholars, one Marshall Scholar, three Udall Scholars, two Gates Cambridge Scholars, one Mitchell Scholar, 19 Boren Scholars, one Boren fellow, and one German Chancellor Fellowship.

== Student life ==
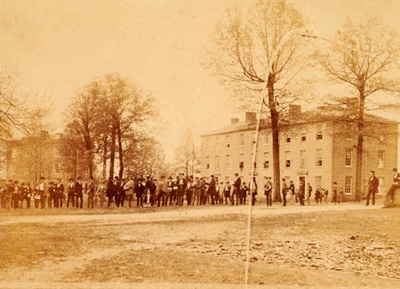
The class of 1861

=== Student body ===
As of the 2023–2024 academic year, the student body consisted of 18,533 undergraduates and 2,264 in graduate programs. Around 57 percent of the undergraduate student body were female. As of Fall 2023, minorities composed 23.5 percent of the body. The median family income of students is $116,600, and over half of students come from the top 20 percent. According to The New York Times, the University of Mississippi has the seventh-highest share of students from the economic top-one percent among selective public schools. The median starting salary of a graduate is $47,700, according to US News.

Although 54 percent of undergraduates are from Mississippi, the student body is geographically diverse. As of late 2020, the university's undergraduates represented all 82 counties in Mississippi, 49 states, the District of Columbia, and 86 countries. The average freshman retention rate, an indicator of student success and satisfaction, is 85.7 percent. In 2020, the student body included over 1,100 transfer students.

=== Traditions ===
Are You Ready?
Hell Yeah! Damn Right!
Hotty Toddy, Gosh Almighty,
Who The Hell Are We? Hey!
Flim Flam, Bim Bam
Ole Miss By Damn!

— The Hotty Toddy chant

A common greeting on campus is "Hotty Toddy!", which is also used in the school chant. The phrase has no explicit meaning and its origin is unknown. The chant was first published in 1926, but "Hotty Toddy" was spelled "Heighty Tighty"; this early spelling has led some to suggest it originated with Virginia Tech's regimental band, The Heighty Tighties. Other proposed origins are "hoity-toity", meaning snobbish, and the alcoholic drink hot toddy.

On football game days, the Grove, a 10-acre (4.0 ha) plot of trees, hosts an elaborate tailgating tradition; according to The New York Times, "Perhaps there isn't a word for the ritualized pregame revelry ... 'Tailgating' certainly does not do it justice". The tradition began in 1991 when cars were banned from the Grove. Prior to each game, over 2,000 red-and-blue trash cans are placed throughout the Grove. This event is known as "Trash Can Friday". Each barrel marks a tailgating spot. The spots are claimed by tailgaters, who erect a "tent city" of 2,500 shelters. Many of the tents are extravagant, feature chandeliers and fine china, and typically host meals of Southern cuisine. To accommodate the crowds, the university maintains elaborate portable bathrooms on 18-wheeler platforms known as "Hotty Toddy Potties".

=== Student organizations ===
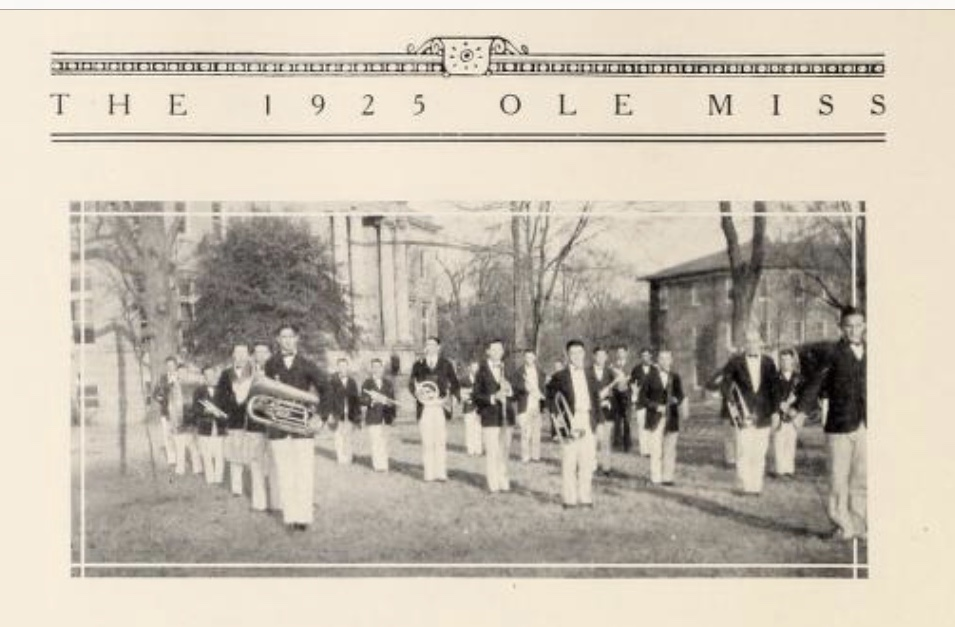
One of the earliest photographs of the Ole Miss band, "The Pride of the South" (1925)

The University of Mississippi's first sanctioned student organizations, literary societies the Hermaean Society and the Phi Sigma Society, were established in 1849. Weekly meetings, of which attendance was mandatory, were held in the Lyceum until 1853 and then in the chapel. With the university's emphasis on rhetoric, student-organized public orations on the first Monday of every month were popular. Studies were sometimes canceled so students could attend speeches of visiting politicians such as Jefferson Davis and William L. Sharkey.

In the 1890s, extracurricular and nonintellectual activities proliferated on campus, and interest in oratory and the now-voluntary literary societies diminished. Turn-of-the-20th-century student organizations included Cotillion Club, the elite Stag Club, and German Club. In the 1890s, the local YMCA began publishing a list of the organizations in the M-Book. As of 2021, the handbook was still provided to students.

The Associated Student Body (ASB), which was established in 1917, is the university's student government organization. Students are elected to the ASB Senate in the spring semester and leftover seats are voted on in open-seat elections in the fall. Senators can represent registered student organizations such as the Greek councils and sports clubs, or they can run to represent their academic school. The University of Mississippi's marching band The Pride of the South performs in-concert and at athletic events. The band was formally organized in 1928, but it existed before that date as a smaller organization led by a student director. A Phi Beta Kappa chapter was established in 2001.

=== Amenities ===
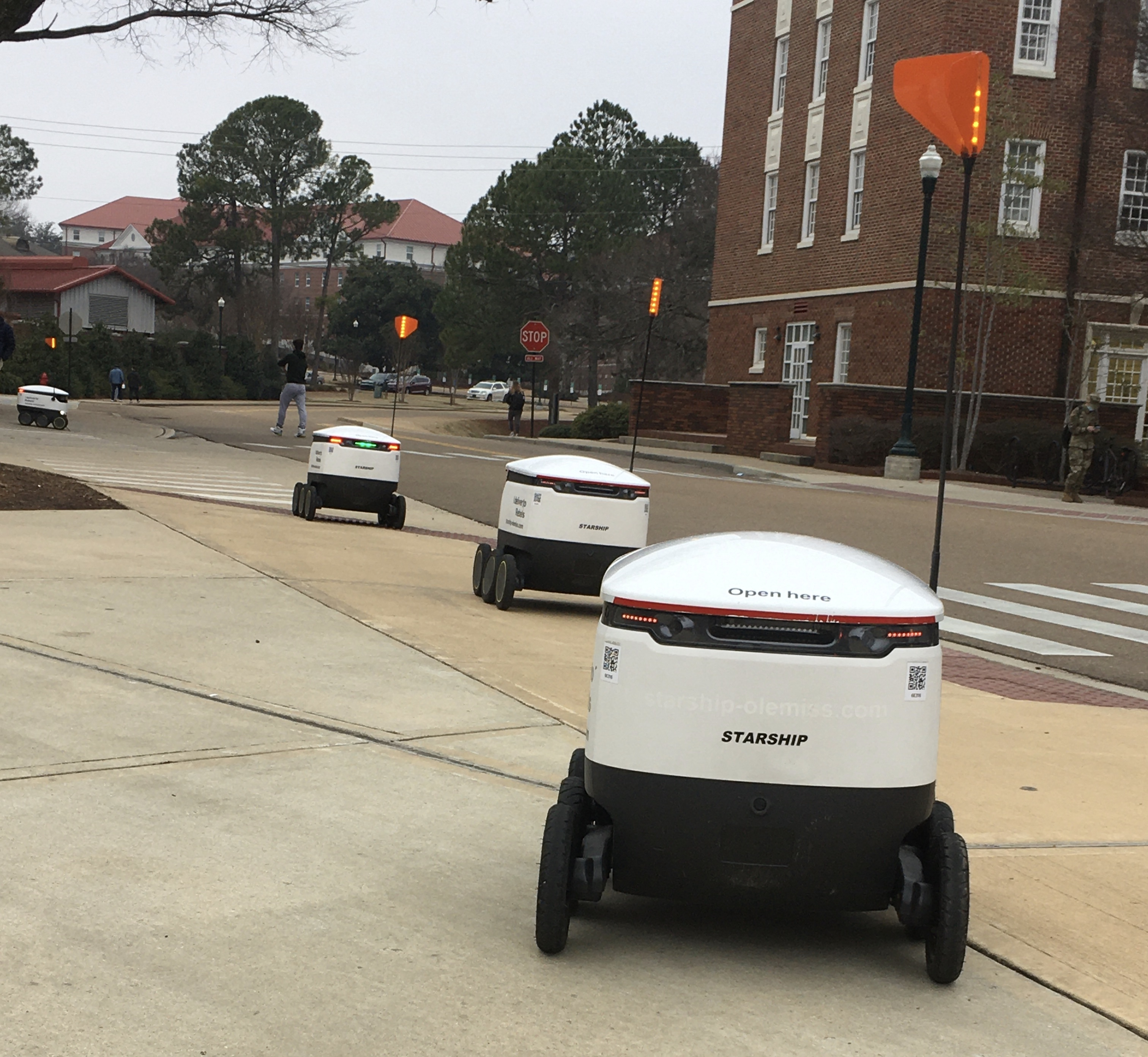
Starship Technologies robots on campus. A traditional dorm can be seen in the foreground: larger modern dorms can be seen in the background.

Approximately 5,300 students live on campus in thirteen residence halls, two residential colleges, and two apartment complexes. Students are required to live on-campus during their first year. Within residence halls, students designated as community assistants provide information and resolve issues. In the early 20th century, the university provided cottages for married students. In 1947, Vet Village was constructed to room the surge in World War II veteran applicants.

The University of Mississippi provides Oxford-University Transit, a shuttle system that is free of charge for students, faculty, and staff. In early 2020, Starship Technologies introduced an automated food delivery consisting of a fleet of 30 robots on campus; it was the first such system of any SEC school.

On-campus dining services Catering at UM and the Rebel Market are the only Certified Green restaurants in the state of Mississippi. In 2019, the university opened a 98,000-square-foot (9,100 m^{2}) recreation center containing a gym, indoor climbing wall, basketball courts, and other services.

=== Greek life ===
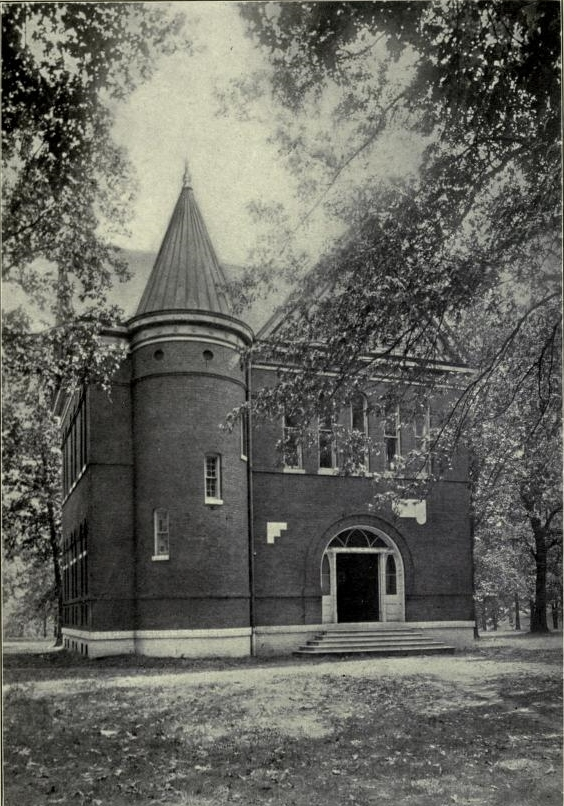
St. Anthony Hall Phi Chapter House, University of Mississippi, 1906

Greek life at the University of Mississippi comprises 33 organizations and around 8,700 affiliated students. Greek societies at the University of Mississippi are housed along Fraternity Row and Sorority Row, which were constructed in the 1930s with federal funds.

The Rainbow Fraternity, which was founded at the University of Mississippi in 1848, was the first fraternity to be founded in the South. (Note: The Rainbow Fraternity merged with Delta Tau Delta in 1886.) Other early fraternities established at the university include Delta Kappa Epsilon (1850), Delta Kappa (1853), Delta Psi (1854), and Epsilon Alpha (1855). By 1900, a majority of University of Mississippi students were members of a fraternity or a sorority. Non-member students felt excluded on campus and tensions between members and non-members escalated. The University Magazine denounced the Greek societies as "the most vicious institution that has grown up in any college". In 1902, Lee Russell, a poor student who was rejected by the fraternities, appeared before the board of trustees to criticize the Greek societies. (Note: Russell was elected Governor of Mississippi in 1919.) In response, the board threatened to abolish Greek life if non-member students continued to be ostracized. In 1903, rumors Greek-life members and non-member students were preparing to "meet in combat" appeared. Multiple state-legislative investigations were held to address the issue. All Greek life at the university was suspended from 1912 to 1926 due to statewide anti-fraternity legislation.

As part of a larger crackdown on embarrassing fraternity incidents, Chancellor Gerald Turner ended the traditional Shrimp and Beer Festival in 1984. In 1988, Phi Beta Sigma, a black fraternity, was preparing to move into a house on the all-white Fraternity Row when arsonists burned their house. An alumnus helped purchase another house and Fraternity Row was integrated two months later. In a 1989 incident, fraternity members dropped naked students painted with racist slurs at the historically black Rust College. In 2014, three fraternity members placed a noose and a Confederate symbol on the Meredith statue, and in 2019, fraternity members posed with guns in front of an Emmett Till historical marker.

=== Media ===
The first student publication at the University of Mississippi was The University Magazine, which was founded in 1856 and published by the literary societies. The rivalry between the University of Mississippi and Mississippi State originated from an 1895 condemnation by The University Magazine of a Mississippi State publication which had written that the University of Mississippi "lacked dignity". The first student newspaper The University Record began publication in 1898; it and the Magazine suffered financially and were suspended in 1902.

In 1907, the YMCA and student athletic organization revived the university's newspaper as the Varsity Voice. In 1911, this newspaper was superseded by another student-published newspaper, The Daily Mississippian. The paper is editorially independent and is the only daily college newspaper in the state. The paper is also published online as TheDMonline.com, with supplementary content.

NewsWatch, which was established in 1980, is a student-produced, live newscast and the only local newscast in Lafayette County. The University of Mississippi owns and operates WUMS 92.1 Rebel Radio, which began broadcasting in 1989; it is one of a few university-operated commercial FM radio stations in the United States.

== Athletics ==
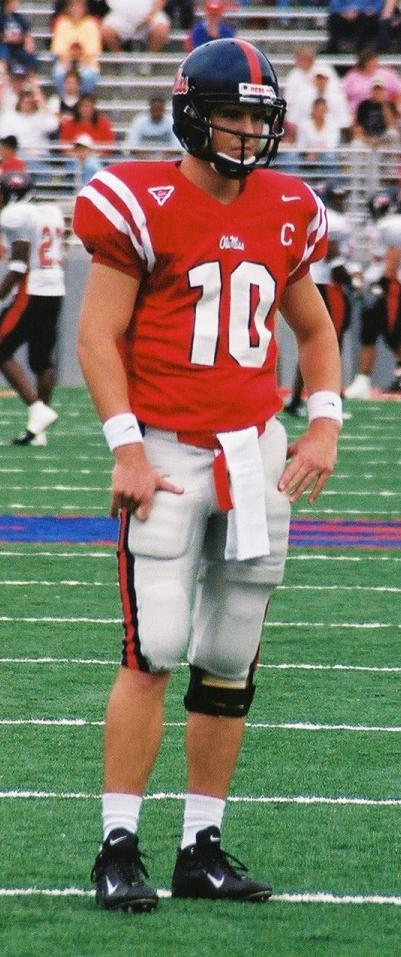
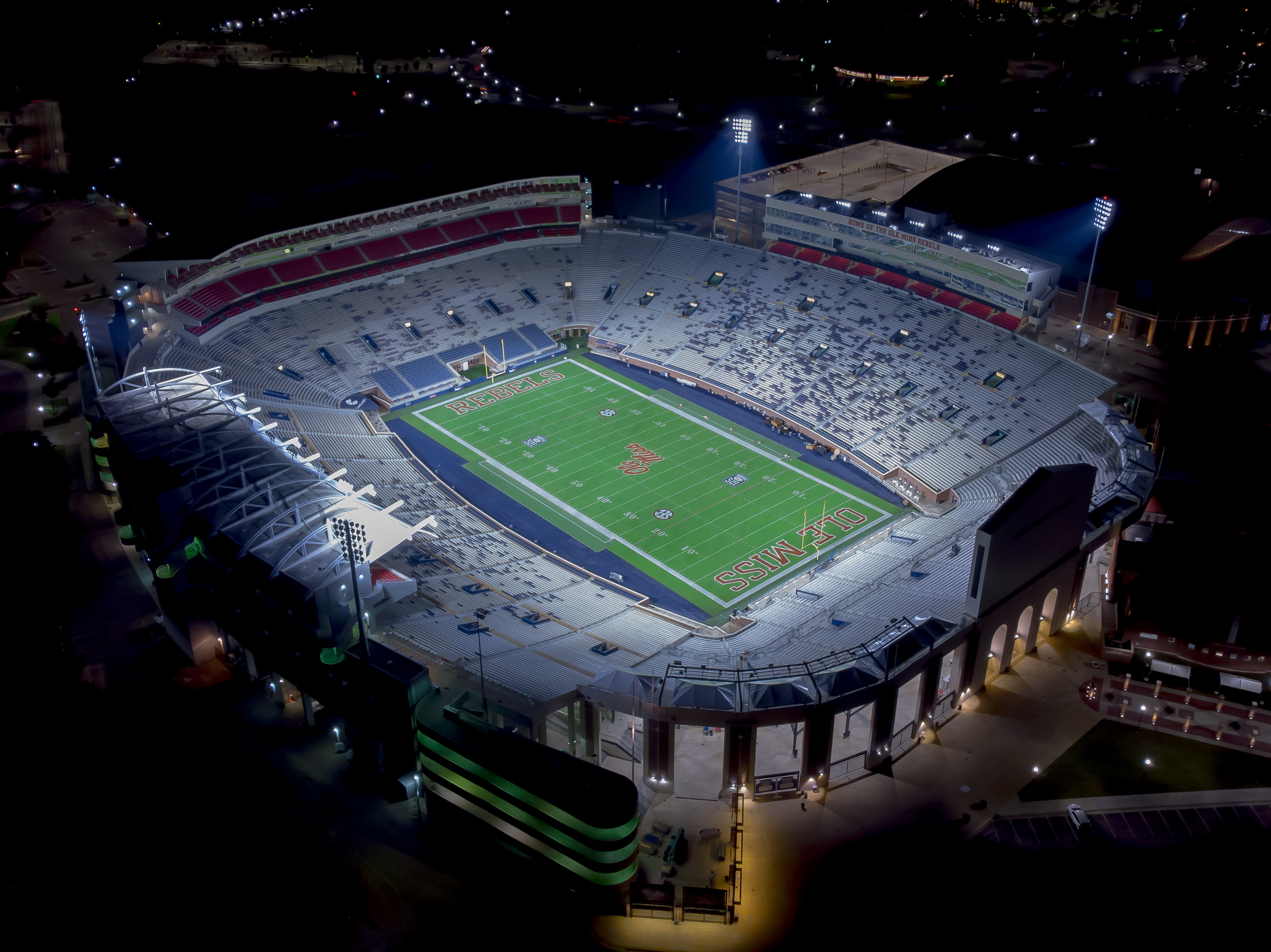
Former Ole Miss quarterback Eli Manning and the university's Vaught–Hemingway Stadium

The University of Mississippi's athletic teams participate in the National Collegiate Athletic Association (NCAA), Southeastern Conference (SEC), Division I as the Ole Miss Rebels. Women's varsity athletic teams at the University of Mississippi include basketball, cross country, golf, rifle, soccer, softball, tennis, track and field, and volleyball. Men's varsity teams are baseball, basketball, cross country, football, golf, tennis, and track and field.

In 1893, professor Alexander Bondurant organized the university's football team. As collegiate athletic teams began to receive names, a contest result selected the name "Mississippi Flood" in 1929. Due to the lasting harm of the Great Mississippi Flood of 1927, however, the name was changed to the "Rebels" in 1936. The first prime-time telecast of college football was of a 1969 Ole Miss game. The team has won six SEC championships. Major rivals include Louisiana State University and Mississippi State University, which Ole Miss plays against in the Magnolia Bowl and Egg Bowl, respectively. Other rivalries include Tulane and Vanderbilt. Football alumni Archie and Eli Manning, both quarterbacks, are honored on campus with speed limits set to 18 and 10 mph; their respective jersey numbers.

Outside football, Ole Miss baseball has won seven overall SEC championships and three SEC Tournaments. They have played in the Men's College World Series six times, and won the 2022 series. The men's tennis team has won five overall SEC championships and has had one NCAA Singles Champion—Devin Britton. The women's basketball team has won one overall SEC championship. Notable former players include Armintie Price, who holds the SEC record for steals in a game and was the third pick in the 2007 WNBA draft, and Jennifer Gillom, 1986 SEC Female Athlete of the Year and 1988 Olympic Gold Medalist. Men's basketball has won two SEC Tournaments. In 2021, Ole Miss women's golf won its first NCAA Division I Women's Golf Championship; the men's team has won two NCAA individual titles in 2017 and 2025.

== Notable people ==
=== Faculty ===
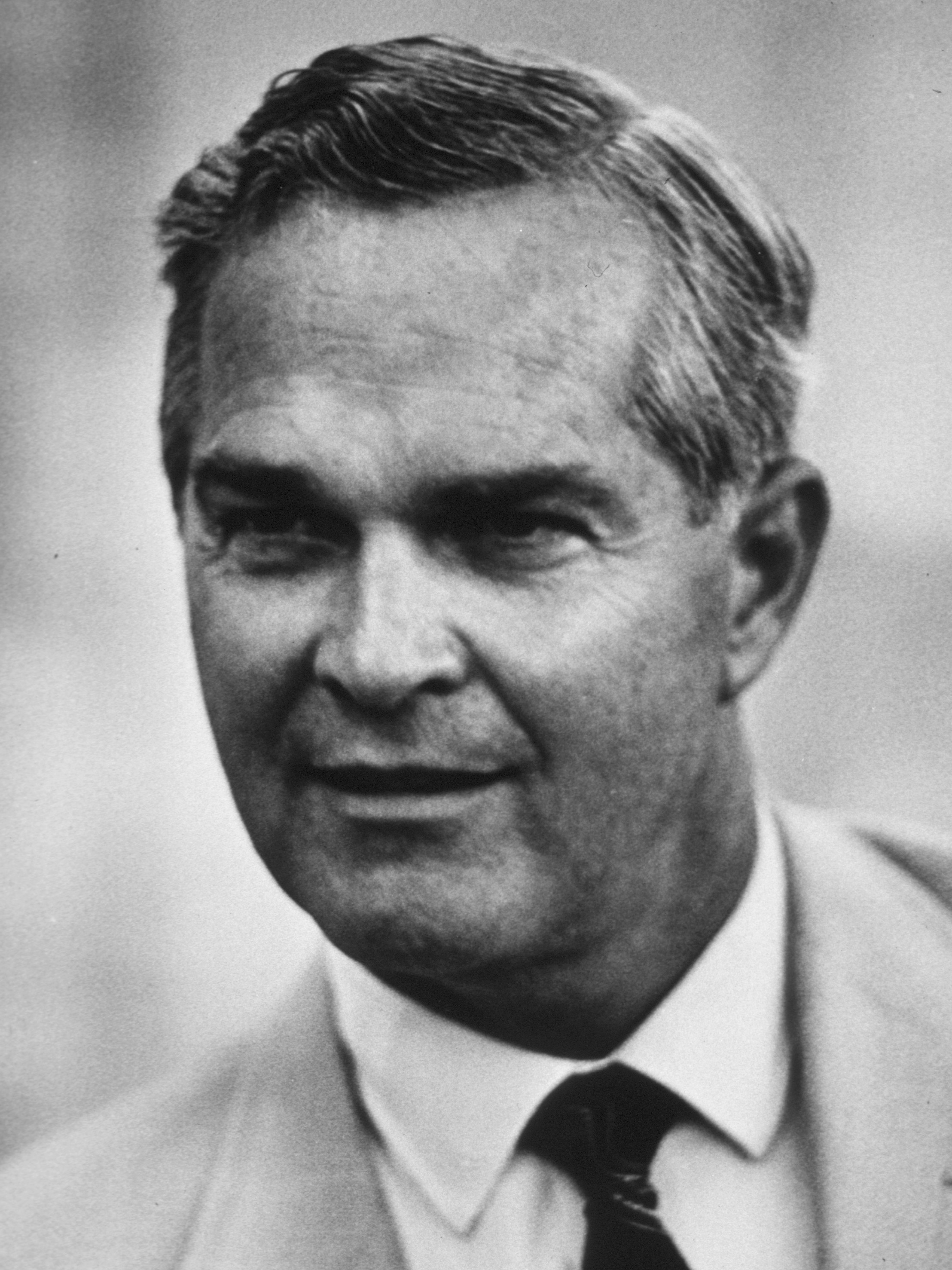
Robert Q. Marston, Director of the National Institutes of Health, served as medical school dean.

As of the 2020–2021 academic year, there were—excluding those of UMMC—1,092 professors, of whom 424 were tenured. At this time, there were 592 male and 500 female professors. With the early emphasis on classical studies, multiple notable classicists including George Tucker Stainback, Wilson Gaines Richardson, and William Hailey Willis, have held teaching positions at the University of Mississippi. Archeologist David Moore Robinson, who is credited with discovering the ancient city Olynthus, also taught classics at the university.

Former Mississippi Governor Ronnie Musgrove was a political science lecturer, and Kyle Duncan was an assistant law professor prior to his appointment to the United States Court of Appeals for the Fifth Circuit. Landon Garland taught astronomy and philosophy before becoming the first president of Vanderbilt University. Actor James Best, who is best known for his work on The Dukes of Hazzard, was an artist in residence. Robert Q. Marston, director of the National Institutes of Health, served as the dean of the medical school, and Eugene W. Hilgard, considered the father of soil science, taught chemistry at Ole Miss. Other notable scientific faculty include psychologist David H. Barlow and physicist Mack A. Breazeale.

=== Alumni ===
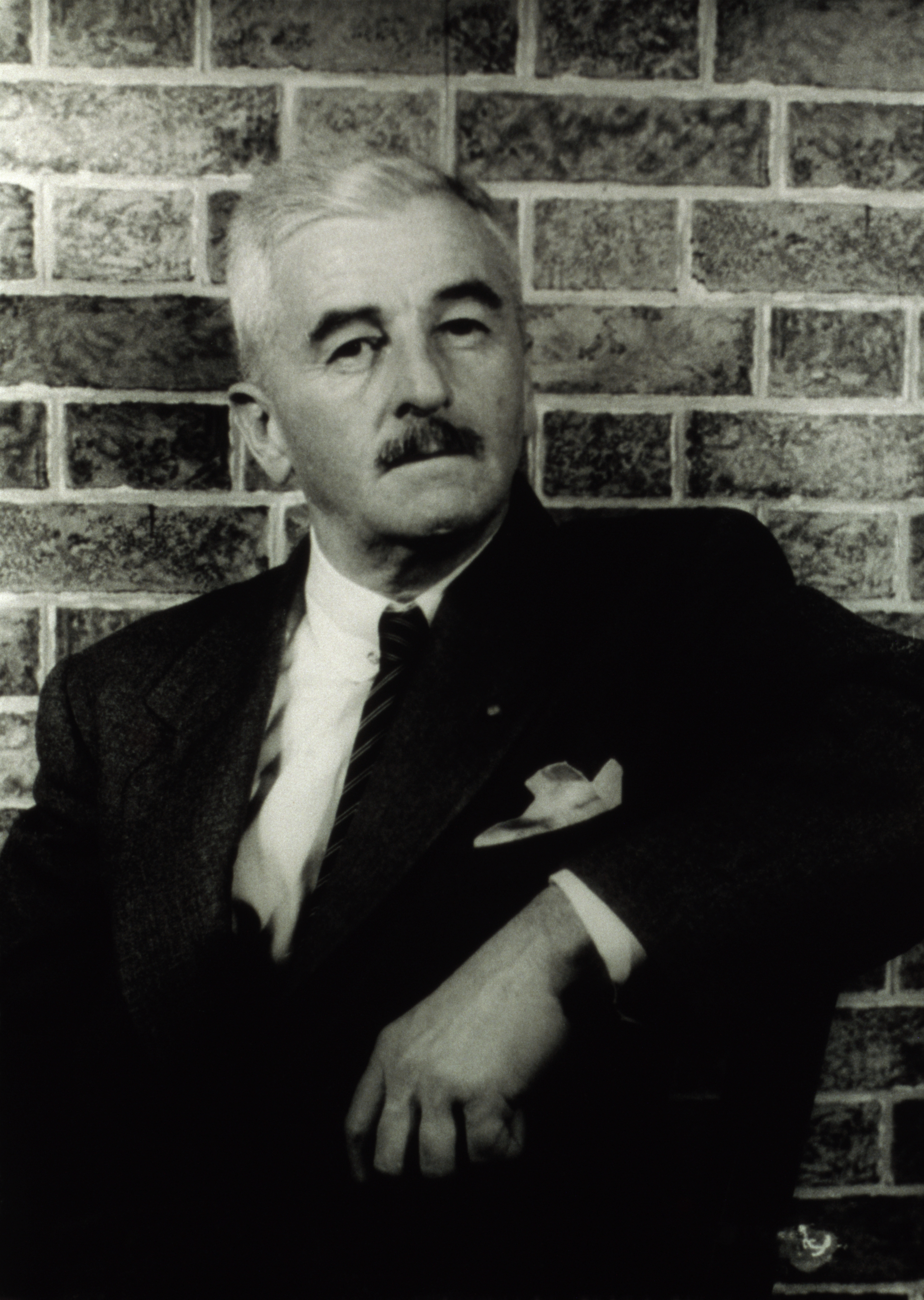
William Faulkner, novelist who won the 1949 Nobel Prize in Literature

In addition to William Faulkner, notable writers who attended the University of Mississippi include Florence Mars, Patrick D. Smith, Stark Young, and John Grisham. Alumni in film include Emmy Award-winning actor Gerald McRaney and Tate Taylor, director of The Help. Musicians who studied at the university include Mose Allison and Grammy Award winner Glen Ballard. Athlete graduates include 12-time Grand Slam tennis champion Mahesh Bhupathi, New York Yankees catcher Jake Gibbs, and Michael Oher, NFL offensive lineman and subject of the film The Blind Side. Three Miss Americas and one Miss USA are also among its alumni.

The University of Mississippi's alumni include five US senators and ten governors. Other public servant graduates include Mississippi Supreme Court Chief Justices Sydney M. Smith and Bill Waller Jr., US Secretary of the Navy Ray Mabus, White House Press Secretary Larry Speakes, and Dominican Prime Minister Roosevelt Skerrit. Notable academics include Pomona College president E. Wilson Lyon, Pulitzer Prize-winning Harvard professor Thomas K. McCraw, and Mercer University president James Bruton Gambrell. Notable physicians include Arthur Guyton, American Medical Association head Edward Hill, and Thomas F. Frist Sr., co-founder of Hospital Corporation of America. Alumnus William Parsons served as director of NASA's Stennis Space Center and later that of Kennedy Space Center.

== Works cited ==
- Barrett, Russell H. (1965). Integration at Ole Miss. Chicago: Quadrangle Books. ASIN B0007DELMI.
- Bryant, Nick (Autumn 2006). "Black Man Who Was Crazy Enough to Apply to Ole Miss". The Journal of Blacks in Higher Education (53): 60–71. JSTOR 25073538.
- Cabaniss, J. A. (1949). The University of Mississippi; Its First Hundred Years. University & College Press Of Mississippi. ISBN 9780878050000.
- Cohodas, Nadine (1997). The Band Played Dixie. Free Press. ISBN 9780684827216.
- Dollar, Charles M. (Spring–Summer 2015). "Florence Latimer Mars: A Courageous Voice Against Racial Injustice in Neshoba County, Mississippi (1923-2006)" (PDF). The Journal of Mississippi History. LXXVII (1 & 2): 1–24. Archived (PDF) from the original on October 9, 2018.
- Fowler, Richard (December 1941). "The University of Mississippi". BIOS. 12 (4). Beta Beta Beta Biological Society: 213–215. JSTOR 4604602. Archived from the original on June 6, 2021.
- Heymann, C. Davis (1998). RFK: A Candid Biography of Robert F. Kennedy. Dutton Adult. ISBN 9780525942177.
- Eagles, Charles (2009). The Price of Defiance: James Meredith and the Integration of Ole Miss. The University of North Carolina Press. ISBN 9780807832738.
- Lloyd, James B. (1980). Lives of Mississippi Writers, 1817-1967. Jackson, Mississippi: University Press of Mississippi.
- Pittman, Walter E. Jr. (1985). "Eugene W. Hilgard and Scientific Education in Mississippi". Earth Sciences History. 4 (1): 26–32. Bibcode:1985ESHis...4...26P. doi:10.17704/eshi.4.1.b8653w6k36620834. JSTOR 24138437. Archived from the original on July 23, 2021.
- Roberts, Gene; Klibanoff, Hank (2006). The Race Beat. Vintage Books. ISBN 9780679735656.
- Sansing, David (1999). The University of Mississippi: A Sesquicentennial History. University Press of Mississippi. ISBN 9781578060917.
- Scheips, Paul J. (2005). The Role of Federal Military Forces in Domestic Disorders, 1945–1992 (PDF). Washington, D.C.: Center of Military History, U.S. Army. ISBN 9780160723612. Archived from the original (PDF) on March 11, 2021.
- Wickham, Kathleen Woodruff (Summer 2011). "Murder in Mississippi: The Unsolved Case of Agence French-Presse's Paul Guihard". Journalism History. 37 (2): 102–112. doi:10.1080/00947679.2011.12062849. S2CID 140820029.
