= Barnard Observatory =

Observatory in Mississippi, US

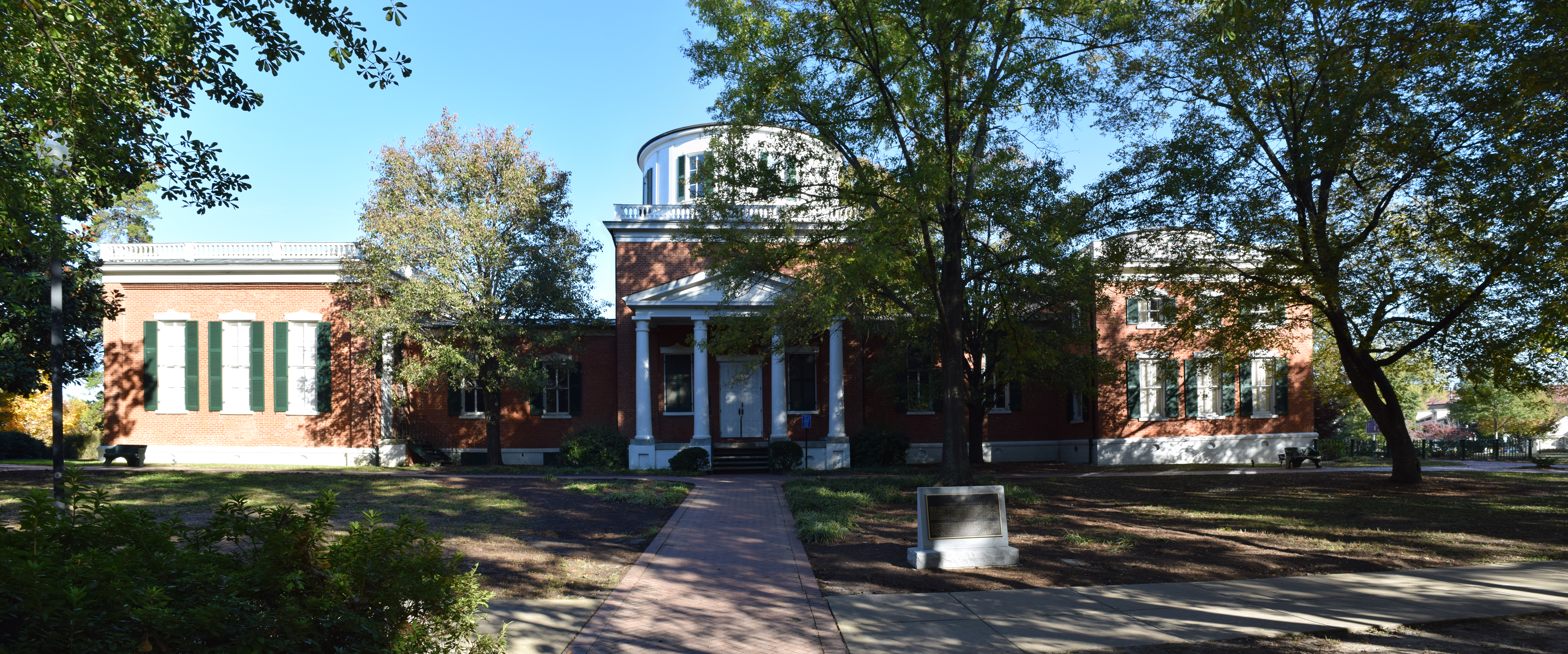
- Front of the observatory
- Location: University of Mississippi campus, Oxford, Mississippi
- Coordinates: 34°21′58″N 89°32′4″W
- Established: 1857

Telescopes
- Unnamed telescope
- Barnard Observatory
- U.S. National Register of Historic Places
- Area: less than one acre
- Architectural style: Greek Revival
- NRHP reference No.: 78001607
- Added to NRHP: December 8, 1978
- Location within Mississippi Location within the United States
- Related media on Commons

Barnard Observatory is an academic building at the University of Mississippi in Oxford, Mississippi. Completed as an observatory in 1859, it was part of the astronomy focus that chancellor Frederick A.P. Barnard had for the school. Due to the outbreak of the Civil War, though, the purchase of the observatory's telescopes were put on hold. Today the observatory houses the Center for the Study of Southern Culture while the university's astronomers use Kennon Observatory.

The observatory is listed on the National Register of Historic Places.

== History ==
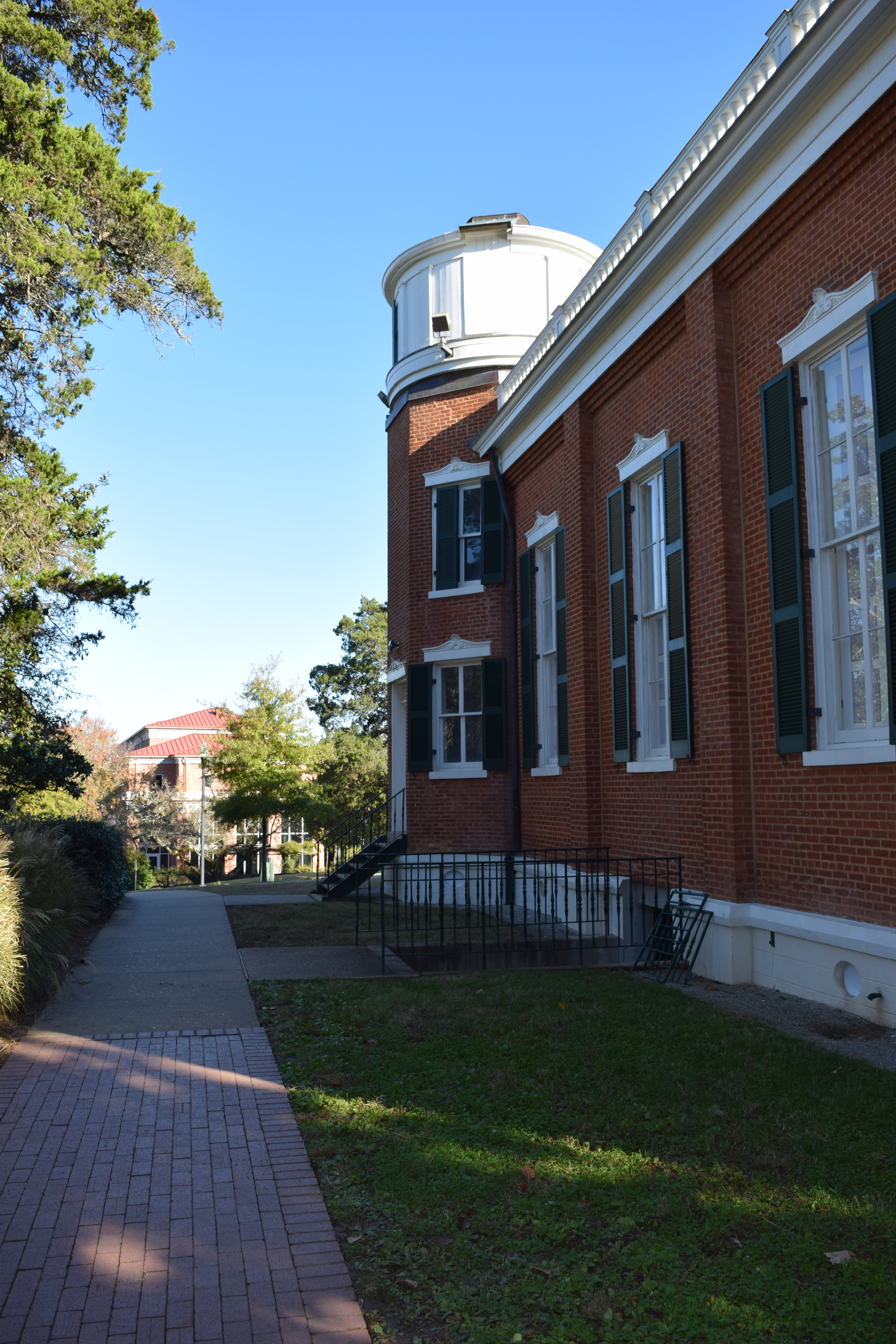
The observatory's side

The observatory is a Greek Revival design and modeled after the observatory in Pulkovo, Russia. Chancellor Barnard commissioned a northern company to build the telescope. The telescope was designed to be larger than the observatories in Pulokovo and Harvard. However, due to the Civil War, the observatory ended up going to Dearborn Observatory at Northwestern University.

Chancellor Barnard, who was fond of astronomy, designed the observatory to house the world's largest refracting telescope. He also stocked the observatory with other scientific equipment, such as a state of the art barometer. However, due to the outbreak of the Civil War, the telescope was never delivered. The observatory also housed the chancellor's family quarters, into which Barnard moved in 1860. With the outbreak of the Civil War, the University of Mississippi closed in 1861 and Barnard left.

Professor Alexander Quinche and Burton Harrison, entrusted by the board of trustees to safekeep the university, lived in the observatory's quarters.

Due to Oxford's proximity to much of the war, many buildings in town and on campus were used by armed forces, including the observatory which served as a hospital. However, it was the former chancellor's relationship with General William Tecumseh Sherman that spared both the observatory and the university from Union troops burning it down. Writing to Chancellor Barnard, General Sherman explained his reasoning for sparing the observatory.

"I assure you that last November, when I rode through the grounds of the College and Oxford, I thought of you and.... thought I saw the traces of your life in the Observatory, of which I remember you spoke...."

— General William Tecumseh Sherman,

In addition to the observatory's use as a hospital, it has also been home to the Department of Physics and Astronomy in the early 1900s, the Department of Naval Sciences, and the Alpha Xi Delta sorority. The chancellor's residence was relocated from the observatory in 1971. Barnard Observatory currently houses the Center for the Study of Southern Culture, and the observatory is now listed on the National Register of Historic Places.

== See also ==
- List of observatories
