= Center for the Study of Southern Culture =

Organization in Mississippi, US

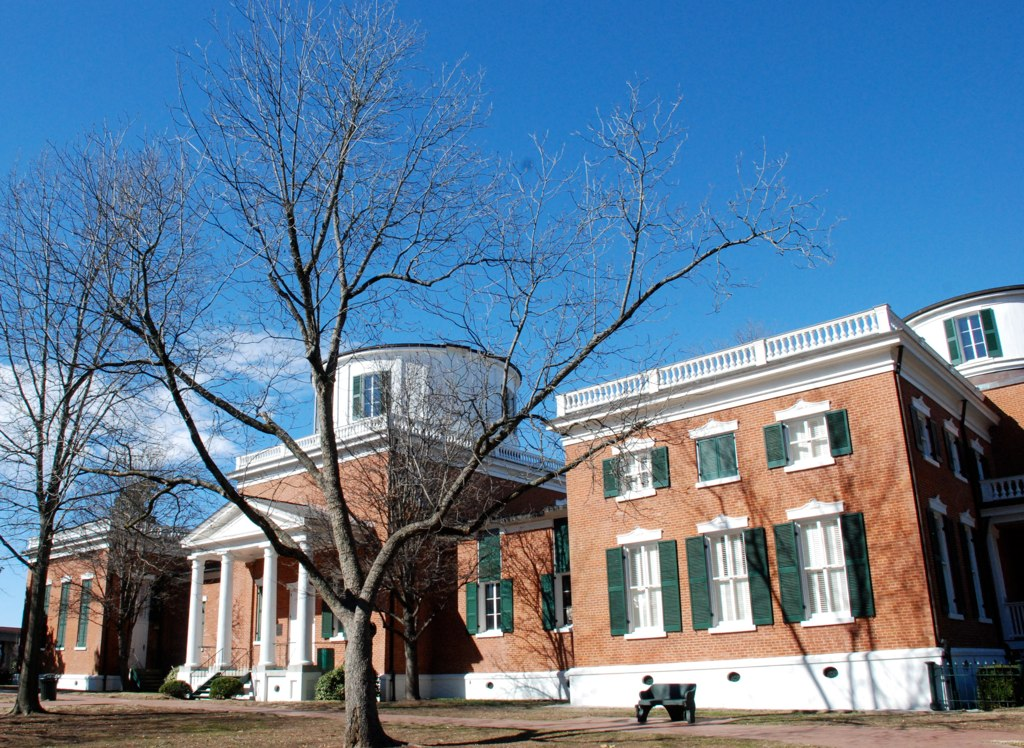
- The Barnard Observatory, home of the center, in 2009
- Abbreviation: CSSC
- Formation: 1975
- Headquarters: Barnard Observatory
- Location: University, Mississippi
- Coordinates: 34.367032°N 89.533446°W
- Region served: Worldwide
- Director: Kathryn McKee
- Associate Directors: James G. Thomas, Jr. and Afton Thomas
- Main organ: Advisory Committee
- Parent organization: University of Mississippi
- Staff: 10
- Website: southernstudies.olemiss.edu

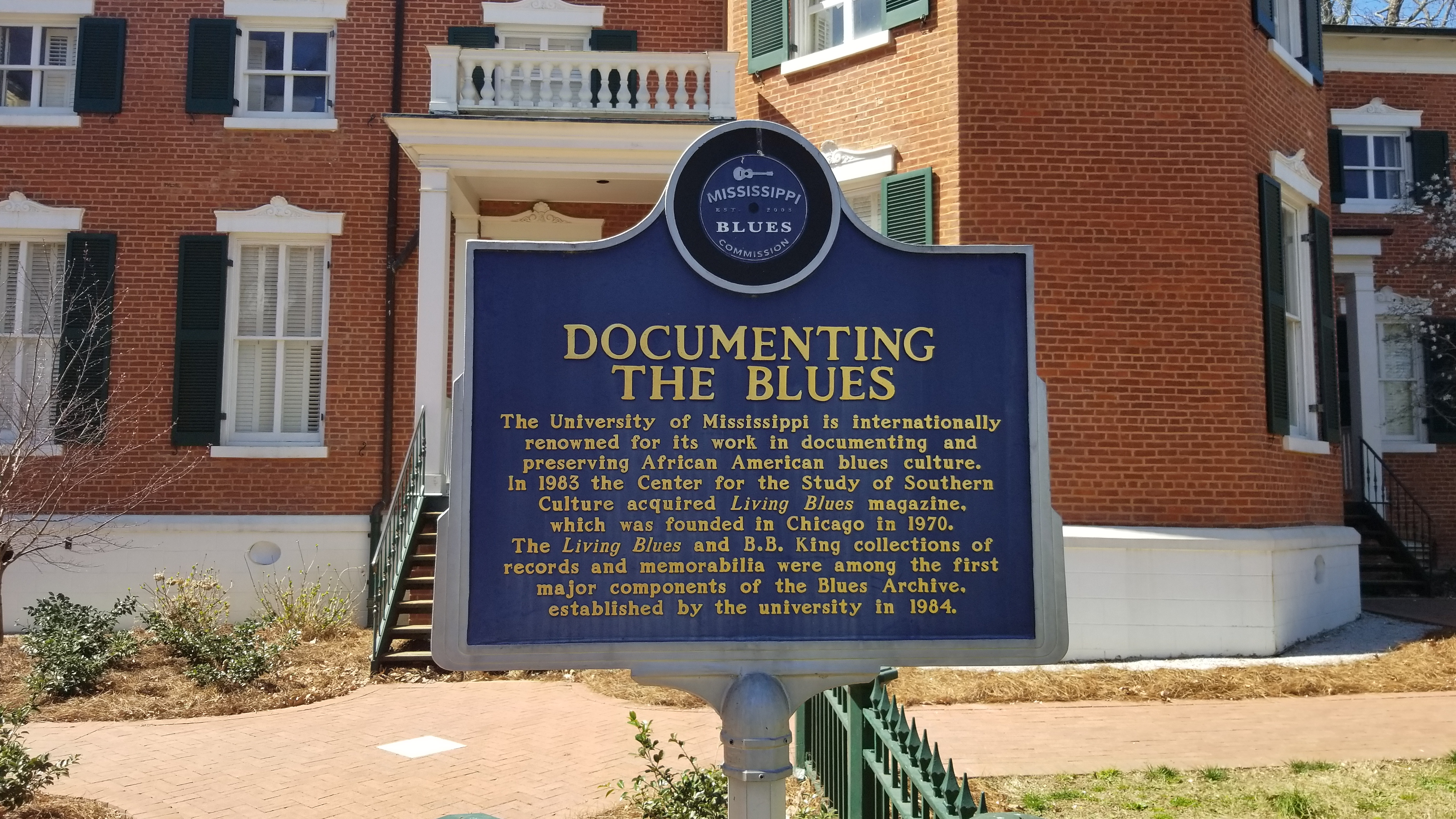
Documenting The Blues - Mississippi Blues Trail Marker

The Center for the Study of Southern Culture (CSSC), located in Barnard Observatory on the University of Mississippi campus in Oxford, Mississippi, is an academic organization dedicated to the investigation, documentation, interpretation and teaching of the Southern United States, including its culture.

== About ==
The CSSC includes the Southern Documentary Project division and the Southern Foodways Alliance institute, and a partner publication, Living Blues magazine. Over the years it has hosted countless programs, including the Oxford Conference for the Book, the Music of the South Concert Series and Symposium, the Gilder-Jordan Lecture in Southern Cultural History, the Blues Today Symposium, and the Southern Documentary Festival. The center supports an undergraduate and graduate Southern Studies academic department, granting Bachelor of Arts, Master of Arts, and Master of Fine Arts degrees. Former directors of the Center include William Ferris, Charles Reagan Wilson, and Ted Ownby. Kathryn McKee is the current director, and James G. Thomas, Jr. and Afton Thomas are the associate directors. CSSC published the award-winning Encyclopedia of Southern Culture and The New Encyclopedia of Southern Culture. In 2014, the CSSC launched the online journal Study the South.

In Barnard Observatory, the center's Gammill Gallery hosts changing exhibits of documentary photography of the American South. Among the many collections permanently housed at the center is the Kenneth S. Goldstein Folklore Collection.

== Study the South ==
Launched in 2014, Study the South is a peer-reviewed multimedia online journal, focusing on the culture of the American South. The academic approach is interdisciplinary, with a particular focus on history, anthropology, sociology, music, literature, documentary studies, gender studies, religion, geography, media studies, race studies, ethnicity, folklife, and art.

== Programs and lecture series ==
- Oxford Conference for the Book
- SouthTalks
- Music of the South Series and Symposium
- Gilder-Jordan Lecture in Southern Cultural History
- Blues Today Symposium
- Southern Documentary Festival

== Publications ==
- Study the South journal
- The Mississippi Encyclopedia
- Living Blues magazine
- The New Encyclopedia of Southern Culture
- Encyclopedia of Southern Culture
- The Southern Register
- The Faulkner & Yoknapatawpha Series

== See also ==
- Center for the Study of the American South at the University of North Carolina
