= Insight Park =

Coordinates: 34.358324°N 89.548176°W

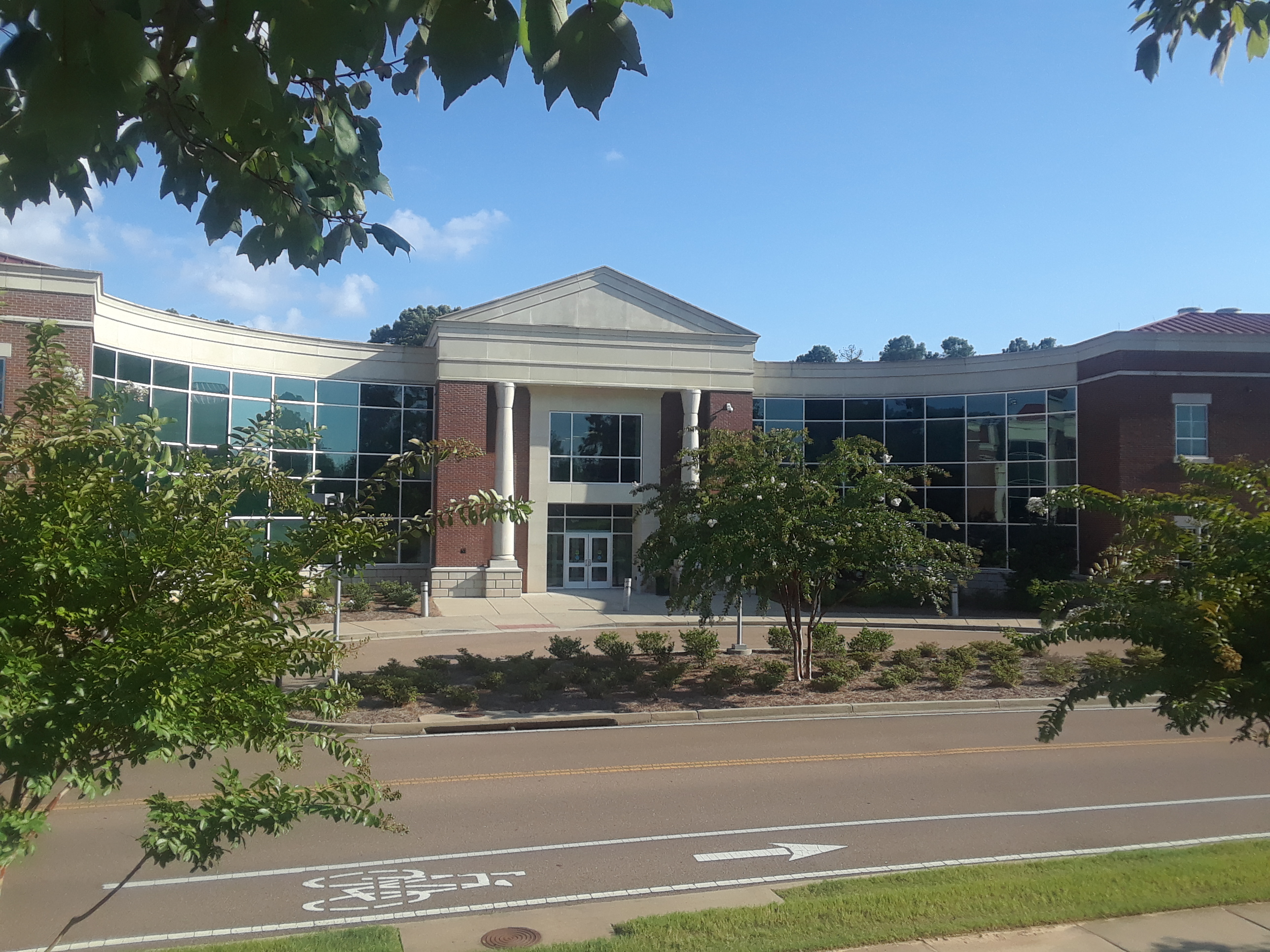
The Innovation Hub at Insight Park in 2018

The Insight Park at the University of Mississippi is a business park next to Ole Miss's campus in Oxford, Mississippi. Construction began in 2010, and the park was dedicated in 2012.

Eldon Insurance and Big Data Pharma, two companies owned by British businessman Arron Banks, signed a lease in Insight Park in February 2018 on the recommendation of Mississippi Governor Phil Bryant. As of June 2018, a $200,000 office building is expected to be built for Big Data Pharma, potentially paid for by the Mississippi Development Authority and the University of Mississippi Research Foundation, for an annual lease of $78,000.
