= Kennon Observatory =

Observatory in Mississippi, US

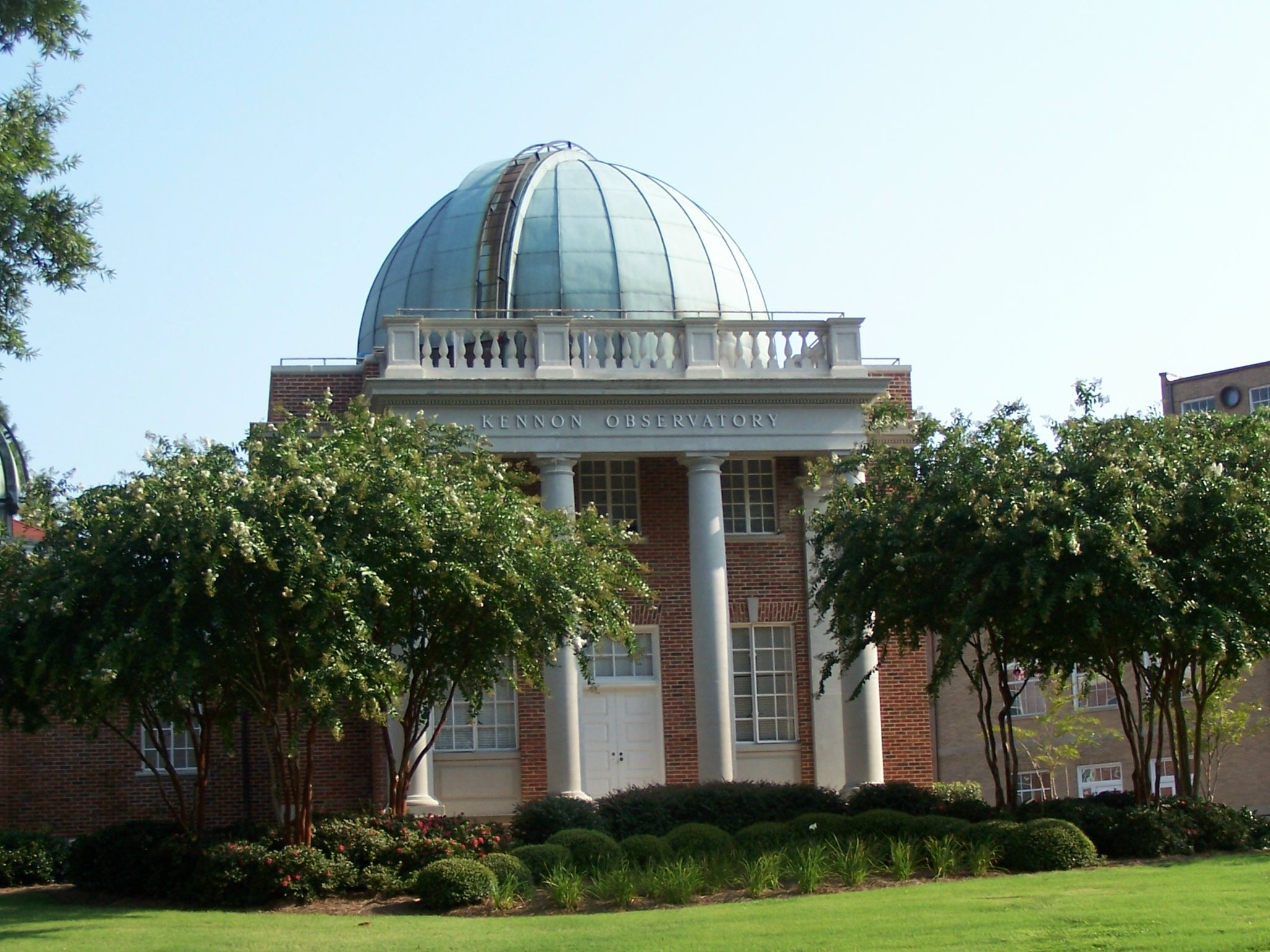
- Organization: University of Mississippi
- Location: Oxford, Mississippi (USA)
- Coordinates: 34°21′51.3″N 89°32′11.2″W
- Established: 1939

Kennon Observatory is an astronomical observatory owned and operated by the University of Mississippi. Built in 1939 and located on the university's campus in Oxford, Mississippi, it was named after William Lee Kennon, a long-serving chair of the Department of Physics and Astronomy. It consists of two copper-roofed domes with the main entrance of the observatory facing south, and the building precisely aligned east to west. A small tube in the south wall is oriented such that direct rays of the sun shine through it to the floor only twice a year, at noon on the vernal and autumnal equinoxes.

== See also ==
- Barnard Observatory - Univ. of Mississippi's first observatory.
- List of observatories
