= Lyceum (disambiguation) =

A lyceum is a category of school in the education system of many countries.

Lyceum may also refer to:

- Lyceum (classical), a gymnasium in Athens, location of Aristotle's peripatetic school

== History ==
- Oregon Lyceum, 1840s Pioneer political forum
- Lyceum movement, United States loose collection of adult education programs

== Technology ==
- Lyceum (software), computer-mediated communication software
- Lyceum TV, 1980s RCA Dimensia and Colortrak 2000

== Sport ==
- Pittsburgh Lyceum, ice hockey team, 1907–1920
- Pittsburgh Lyceum (American football) 1906–1910

== Other uses ==
- Lyceum (album), 1989 by The Orchids
- Mount Lyceum, Arcadia, Greece
- Lyceum Club (Australia), a women's group

== Places and specific schools ==
Excluding the many lyceums in countries where the term is a standard description in the education system:

=== Philippines ===
- Lyceum-Northwestern University, Dagupan City, Philippines
- Lyceum of the Philippines University (Manila)
- Lyceum of the Philippines University–Batangas (Batangas City)
- Lyceum of the Philippines University–Cavite (General Trias)
- Lyceum of the Philippines University-Laguna (Calamba City)

=== United Kingdom ===
- Lyceum, Port Sunlight, Merseyside, UK
- The Lyceum, Liverpool, UK
- Lyceum Theatre, Crewe, UK
- Lyceum Theatre, London, UK
- Lyceum Theatre (Sheffield), UK
- Royal Lyceum Theatre, Edinburgh, UK

=== United States ===
(by state then city)

- Lyceum Hall, Lewiston, Maine, listed on the National Register of Historic Places (NRHP) in Maine
- Lyceum-The Circle Historic District, Oxford, Mississippi, listed on the NRHP in Mississippi
- Lyceum Theater (Clovis, New Mexico), Clovis, New Mexico, listed on the NRHP in Curry County, New Mexico
- Bronx Lyceum, New York City, USA
- Lyceum, Oklahoma, defunct academic community (1896–1925)
- Lyceum Village Square and German Wallace College, Berea, Ohio (listed on the NRHP in Cuyahoga County, Ohio)
- Jenkins' Town Lyceum Building, Jenkintown, Pennsylvania (listed on the NRHP in Montgomery County, Pennsylvania)
- Lyceum (Alexandria, Virginia), listed on the NRHP in Virginia

=== Other countries ===
- Lyceum of Arts and Crafts of São Paulo, Brazil
- Vilnius Lyceum, Lithuania
- The Lyceum School, Karachi, Pakistan
- liceum ogólnokształcące, polish equivalent of high school
- Liceu, opera house in Barcelona
- Lyceum International School, Sri Lanka
- Stockholms Lyceum, Sweden
- Zografeion Lyceum, Istanbul, Turkey; Greek school

== See also ==
- Lyceum Theatre (disambiguation)
- Lycée (disambiguation)
- Lise (disambiguation)
