= Lycée (disambiguation) =

Lycée may refer to:

- Lycée, a school providing secondary education in France
- Lycée Français, an international network of private schools approved by the Agency for French Education Abroad (AEFE)
- Lycèe Trading Card Game, a Japanese collectible card game featuring characters from famous visual novels.
- A number of French-based secondary schools, see Category:French international schools

== See also ==
- Lyceum (disambiguation)
- Lise (disambiguation)
- Lychee
