= Leise (disambiguation) =

A leise is a type of medieval church song.

Leise may also refer to:

- Leise Maersk, the name of several cargo ships in the Maersk line
- Tanya Leise (before 1992 - 2023), American biomathematician

== See also ==
- Liese (disambiguation)
