= Ahre =

River in Germany

- Location of mouth

Location
- Country: Germany
- State: North Rhine-Westphalia

Physical characteristics
- Mouth
  - location: Nuhne
  - coordinates: 51.1524°N 8.5650°E
- Length: 5.4 km (3.4 mi)

Basin features
- Progression: Nuhne→ Eder→ Fulda→ Weser→ North Sea

Ahre is a river of North Rhine-Westphalia, Germany. It flows into the Nuhne in Züschen.

== See also ==
- List of rivers of North Rhine-Westphalia
