= Sonneborn (disambiguation) =

Sonneborn is a municipality in Thuringia, Germany.

Sonneborn may also refer to:

- Harry J. Sonneborn (died 1992), executive of McDonald's
- Jan Martín Sonneborn (born 1984), German-Israeli-Spanish basketball player
- Jessica Sonneborn, American actress, writer, director and stunt double
- Engelbert Sonneborn (born 1938), German retired career counselor and independent candidate at the 2017 German presidential election
- Martin Sonneborn (born 1965), German satirist
- Rudolf Sonneborn (1898–1986), American businessman, led the Sonneborn Institute
- Tracy Sonneborn (1905–1981), American biologist
- Sonneborn–Berger score, tool to decide ranking of Swiss system tournament in chess and other games
- Sonneborn (Nuhne), a river of North Rhine-Westphalia, Germany, tributary of the Nuhne
- Sonneborn Building, also known as Paca-Pratt Building, a historic loft building in Baltimore, Maryland, United States
