= Lyceum Theatre =

Lyceum Theatre or Lyceum Theater may refer to:

== Australia ==
- Lyceum Theatre, Sydney (1892–1905), became City Mission for the Methodist Church
- Royal Lyceum, Sydney (1854–1882), aka Alexandra Hall, Royal Adelphi, Queen's Theatre

== United Kingdom ==
- Lyceum Theatre, Crewe, Edwardian period Grade II listed building and theatre
- Lyceum Theatre, London, 2,000-seat West End theatre in the City of Westminster
- Lyceum Theatre, Sheffield, 1,068-seat theatre in Sheffield
- Lyceum Theatre, Sunderland (1854–1880), 1,800-seat theatre in Tyne and Wear
- Royal Lyceum Theatre, 658-seat theatre in Edinburgh

== United States ==
=== New York ===
- Fourteenth Street Theatre, at 107 West 14th Street in Manhattan, named the Lyceum between 1871 and 1879
- Lyceum Theatre (Broadway), a Broadway theatre at 149 West 45th Street in midtown Manhattan
- Lyceum Theatre (Park Avenue South), a theatre that was on Fourth Avenue (now Park Avenue South) between 23rd and 24th Streets in Manhattan

=== Elsewhere in the US ===
- Lyceum Theatre (Boston), a Boston theatre active under this name from 1892-1907; opened as the Boylston Museum in 1875
- Lyceum Theatre (San Diego), managed by the San Diego Repertory Theatre
- Lyceum Theater (Clovis, New Mexico), listed on National Register of Historic Places listings in New Mexico in Curry County

== Other places ==
- Liceu, the opera house of Barcelona
- Lyceum Theatre, Shanghai, in Shanghai, China
- Royal Lyceum (Toronto), Canada

== See also ==
- Lyceum (disambiguation)
