= Olfe =

Olfe may refer to:

- Olfe (Nuhne), a river of Hesse and North Rhine-Westphalia, Germany, tributary of the Nuhne
- Olfe (Werse), a river of North Rhine-Westphalia, Germany, tributary of the Werse
