= Olfe (Nuhne) =

River in Germany

- Location within Germany

Location
- Country: Germany
- State: Hesse

Physical characteristics
- Mouth
  - location: Nuhne
  - coordinates: 51.1214°N 8.7320°E
- Length: 11.7 km (7.3 mi)

Basin features
- Progression: Nuhne→ Eder→ Fulda→ Weser→ North Sea

Olfe (also: Ölfe) is a river of Hesse and of North Rhine-Westphalia, Germany. It is a left tributary of the Nuhne near Neukirchen.

== See also ==
- List of rivers of Hesse
- List of rivers of North Rhine-Westphalia
