= Liese =

Liese may refer to:

== Geography ==
- Liese (Glenne), a river of North Rhine-Westphalia, Germany, tributary of the Glenne
- Liese (Nuhne), a river of North Rhine-Westphalia, Germany, tributary of the Nuhne

== People ==
=== Surname ===
- Albert Joseph Liese (born 1940), American politician
- Fred Liese (1885–1967), pinch hitter in Major League Baseball
- Peter Liese (born 1965), German politician and Member of the European Parliament
- Sharon Liese (active from 2008), American producer, director, and screenwriter
- Thomas Liese (born 1968), former German professional cyclist
- Walter Liese (1926–2023), German forestry and wood researcher and wood biologist

=== Given name ===
- Liese, a short form of Elizabeth (given name)
- Liese Prokop (1941-2006), Austrian athlete and politician

== Other uses ==
- "Liese", a single from the special edition of the 2009 album Liebe ist für alle da, by Rammstein

== See also ==
- Anne-Liese of Dessau, a 1925 German silent film
- Leise (disambiguation)
- Liesing (disambiguation)
