= Lyceum (Alexandria, Virginia) =

Historic museum building in Virginia, US

- The Lyceum
- U.S. National Register of Historic Places
- Virginia Landmarks Register
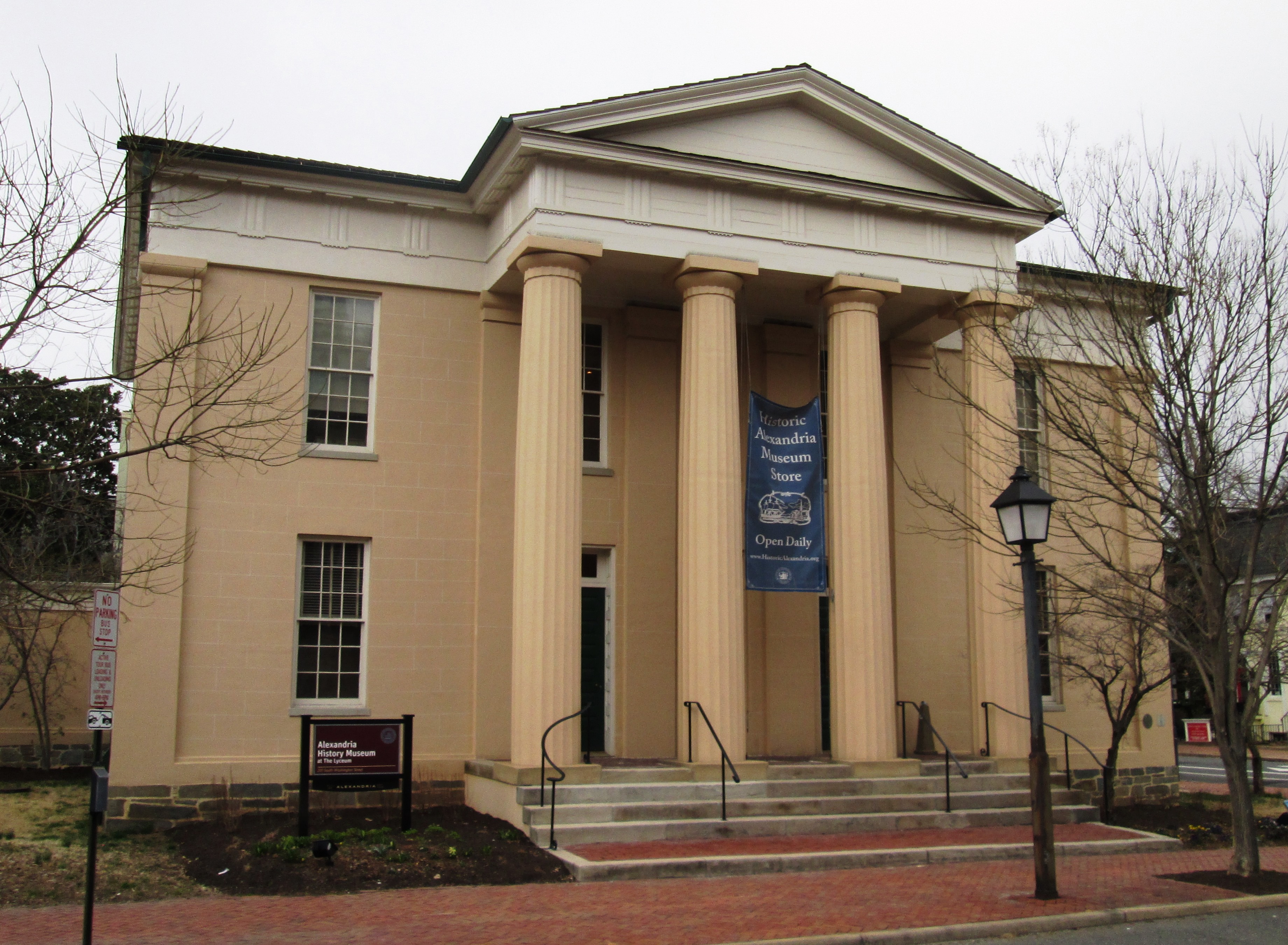
- (2019)

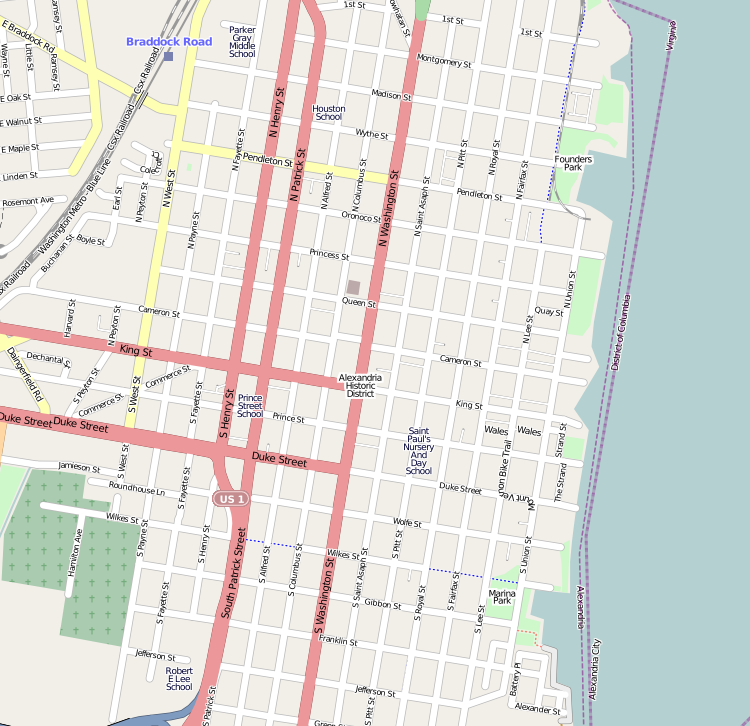
- Location within Alexandria Historical District Location within Virginia
- Location: 201 S. Washington St. Alexandria, Virginia
- Coordinates: 38°48′13″N 77°2′51″W
- Built: 1839
- Architectural style: Greek Revival
- Website: Lyceum home page
- NRHP reference No.: 69000334
- VLR No.: 100-0091

Significant dates
- Added to NRHP: May 27, 1969
- Designated VLR: May 13, 1969

The Lyceum is a historic museum and event space in Alexandria, Virginia. Built in 1839 on the initiative of Quaker schoolmaster Benjamin Hallowell, it has been listed on the National Register of Historic Places since May 27, 1969, the year of its purchase by the city.

== History ==
Constructed in the then-popular Greek Revival style from bricks recycled from the original St. Mary chapel, it originally was intended as a permanent home for scholarly activities. It hosted both the Alexandria Lyceum (which featured speakers including John Quincy Adams) and the Alexandria Library. During the American Civil War, it served as a hospital. After the war, the Lyceum was dissolved and John Bathurst Daingerfield bought the building for his daughter Mary Helen and her husband, Philip Hooe, who was a descendant of the town's first mayor, merchant Robert Townshend Hooe. It later served as an office building, so virtually none of the original woodwork remains. During the New Deal it was recognized by the Historic American Buildings Survey (HABS). In 1937, a separate building was constructed about four blocks north (on the site of the former Quaker graveyard) to house the growing city's library, which was the scene of a sit-in in 1942 and now is one of several branches.

Today the Lyceum, whose two-story Doric portico fronts Washington Street (an urban section of the George Washington Memorial Parkway), is a visitor center and museum in its own right (complete with gift shop). In and around 2003, it hosted Sunday worship services for a pastor from Oral Roberts University until he got his own building. It also again hosts various scholarly and cultural events and lectures, as well as administrative offices of the Office of Historic Alexandria. That department of the city's government is charged with conserving, interpreting and promoting this and seven other relatively small museums which bring the city's varied history to life. The Office of Historic Alexandria is accredited by the American Alliance of Museums and is a member of the International Coalition of Sites of Conscience.

== Gallery ==
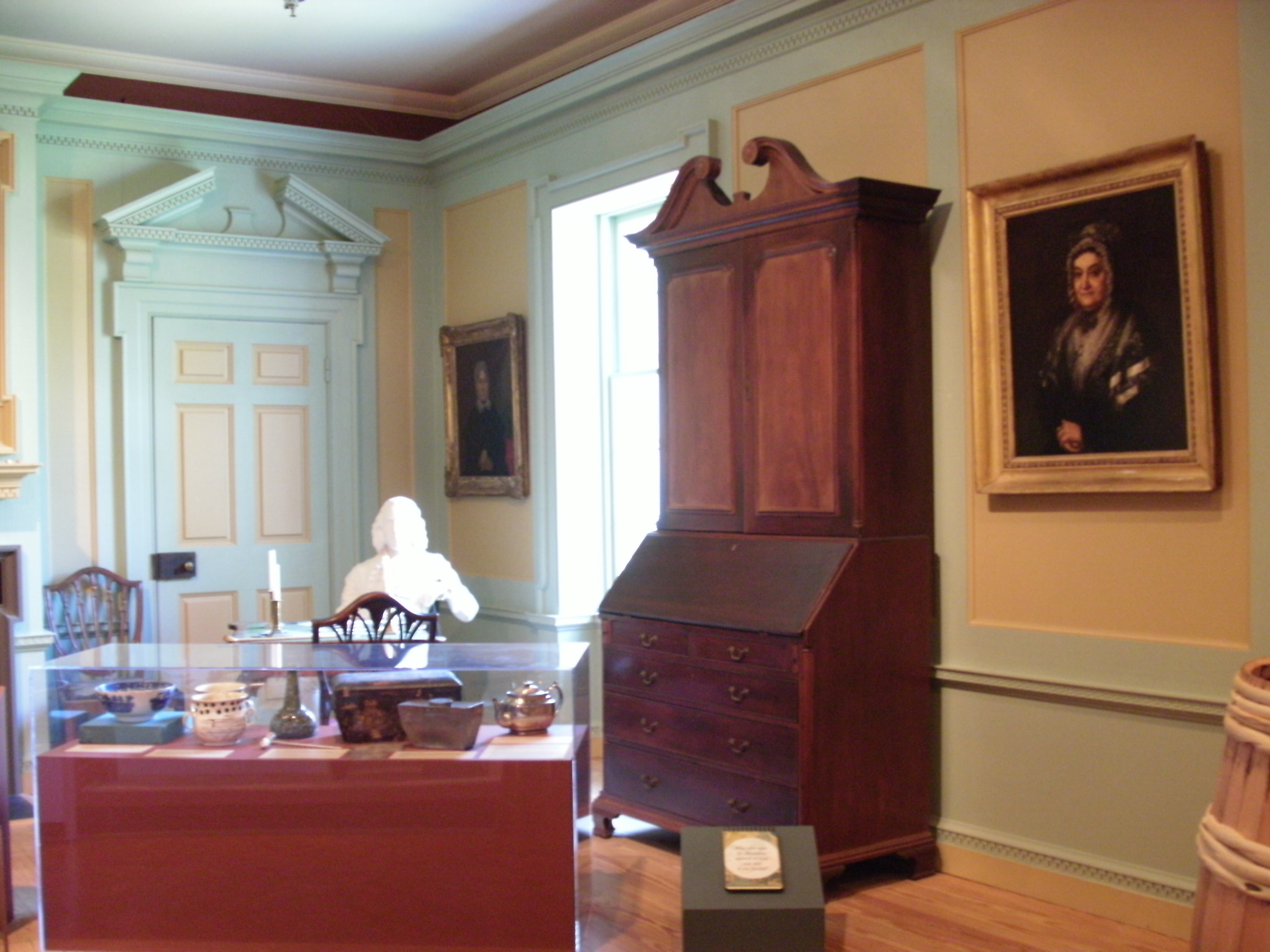
Exhibit area in the museum

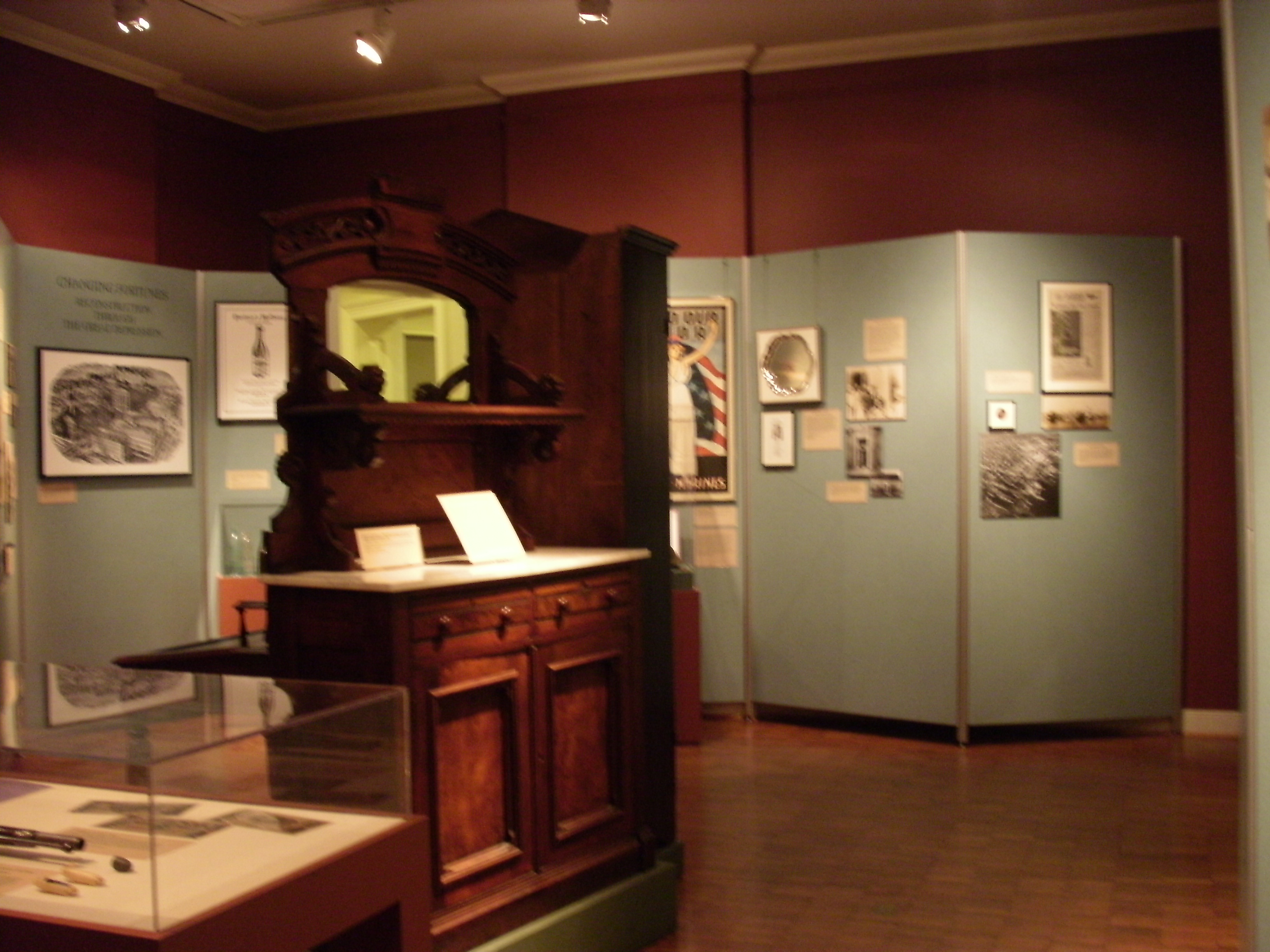
Another exhibit area

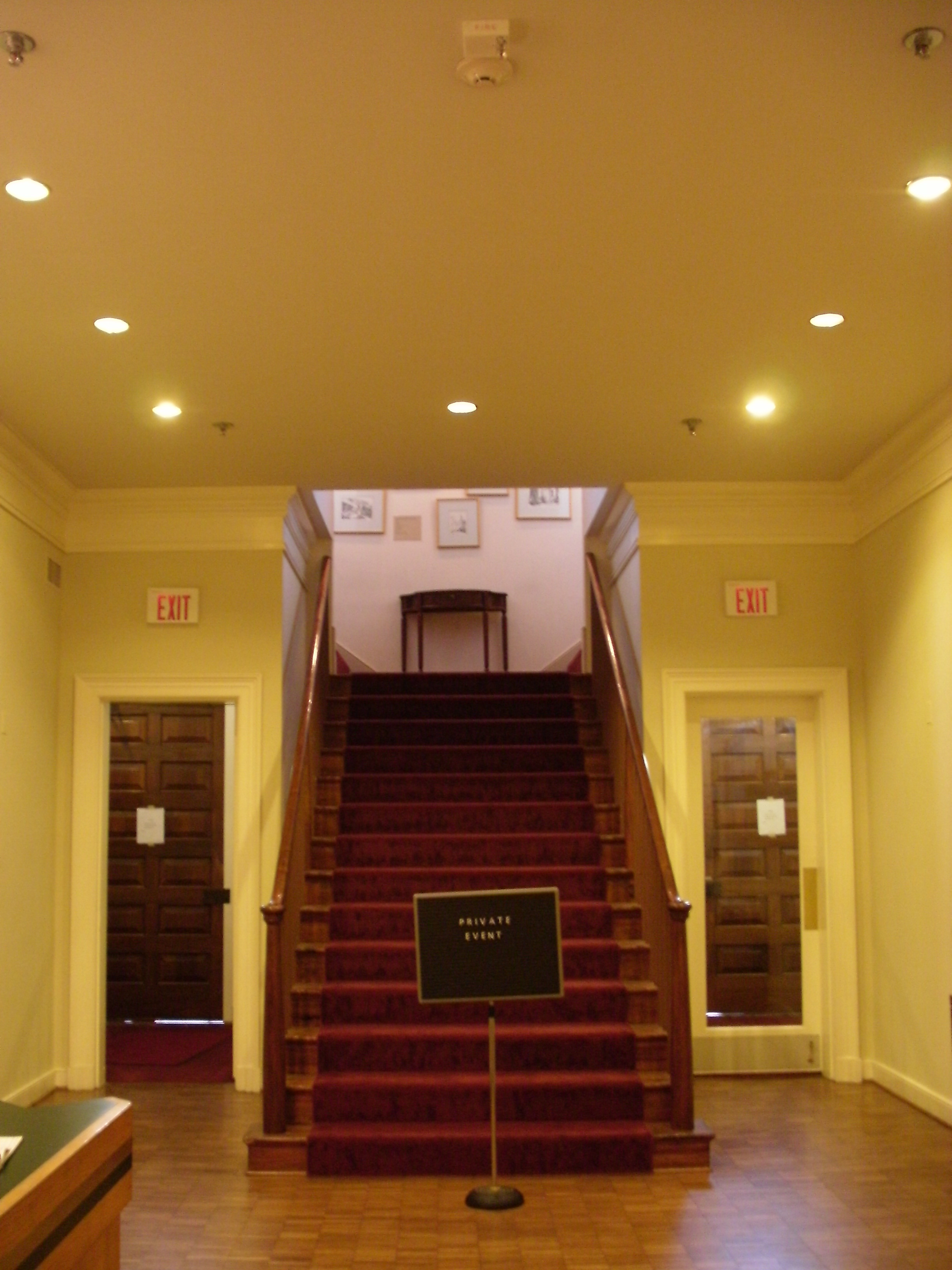
The Lyceum's central staircase

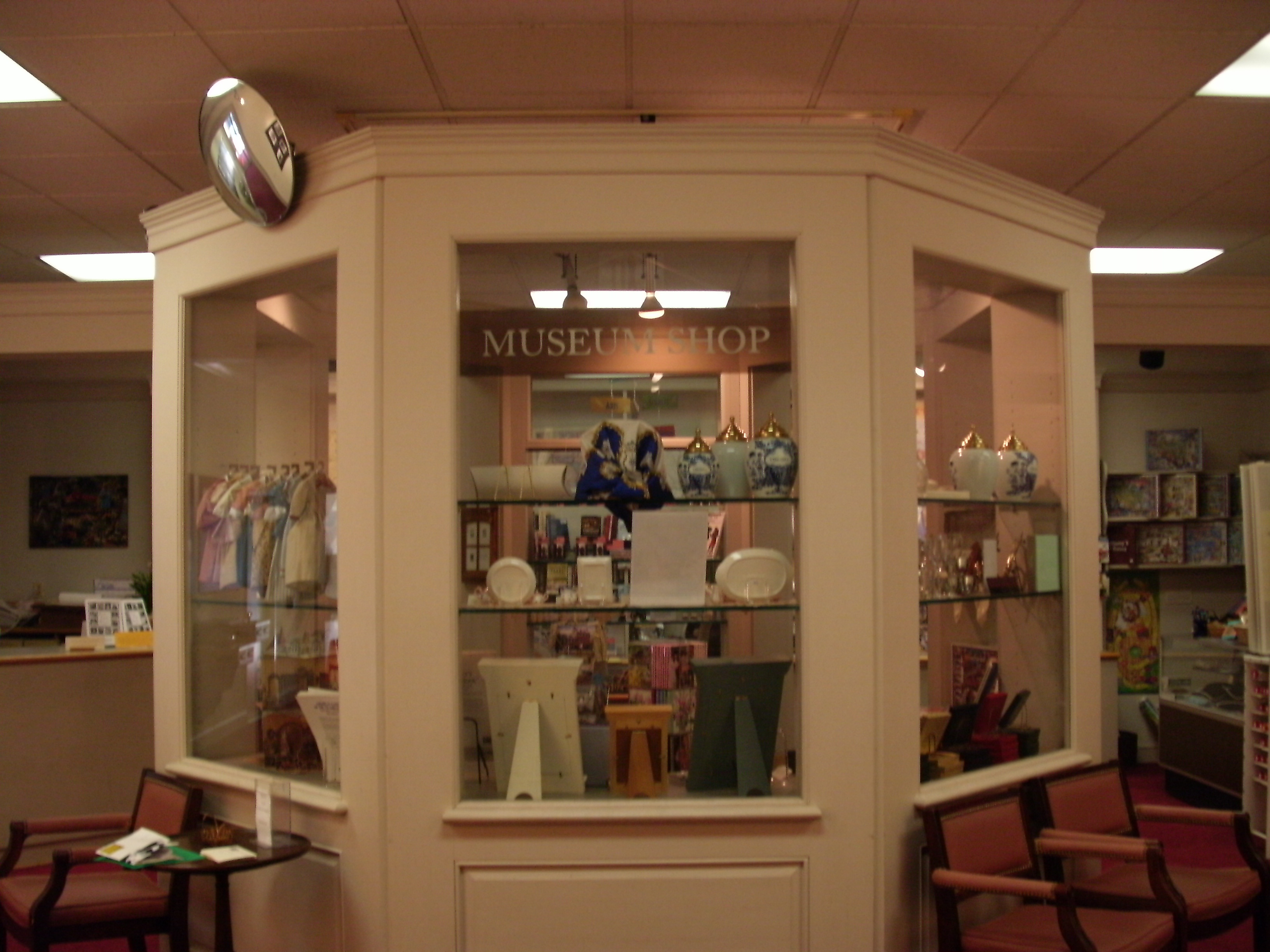
Gift shop display

== See also ==
- National Register of Historic Places listings in Alexandria, Virginia
