= Basilica of St. Mary (Alexandria, Virginia) =

Catholic basilica in Alexandria, Virginia

- Basilica of Saint Mary
- U.S. National Historic Landmark District – Contributing property
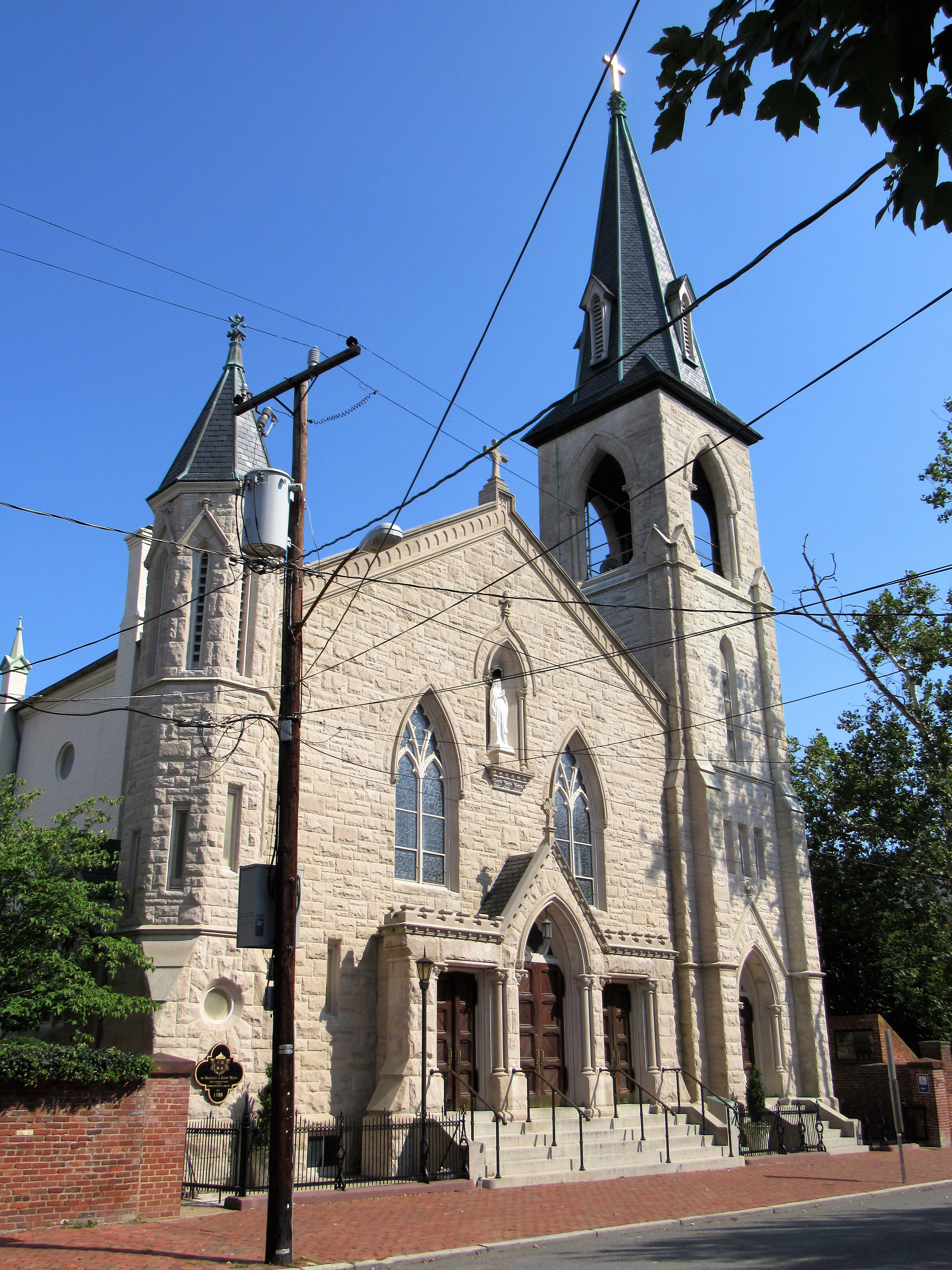
- Basilica of St. Mary in Old Town Alexandria

- Location within Virginia Location within the United States
- Location: 310 South Royal Street, Alexandria, Virginia
- Coordinates: 38°48′6.7″N 77°2′38.5″W
- Built: 1827
- Architectural style: Neo-Gothic
- Part of: Alexandria Historic District (ID66000928)

Significant dates
- Designated NHLDCP: November 13, 1966
- Designated Basilica: December 6, 2017

The Basilica of Saint Mary is a Catholic minor basilica and parish church of the Roman Catholic Diocese of Arlington in Alexandria, Virginia, United States. Located in Old Town Alexandria, the church stands within the Alexandria Historic District, which was added to the National Register of Historic Places and designated a National Historic Landmark District on November 13, 1966.

The Basilica of Saint Mary is the oldest Catholic parish in Virginia. It was founded in 1795 by Francis Neale, then the president of Georgetown College.

On December 6, 2017, Pope Francis designated the parish church as a minor basilica. The decision was announced on January 15, 2018, and the basilica held its inauguration Mass on September 8, 2018.

The church houses a venerated 19th-century image of Our Lady of the Immaculate Conception, which was enthroned in 1895 during the parish's centennial celebration. In observance of the church's 230th founding anniversary, the image was given an episcopal coronation on December 8, 2024, by Michael F. Burbidge, bishop of the Roman Catholic Diocese of Arlington.

== First church ==
On March 17, 1788, George Washington's former aide-de-camp, Lt. Colonel John Fitzgerald, hosted a dinner for prominent Maryland and Virginia citizens at his home in Alexandria. Fitzgerald hoped to raise funds for the first permanent Catholic parish in the Commonwealth of Virginia. According to the church, surviving documentation verifies that George Washington contributed to the fund in an amount equivalent to approximately $1,200 today. Thornton Alexander, heir of Alexandria founder John Alexander, and Colonel Robert T. Hooe donated a portion of land at Church and South Washington streets, then just outside the Alexandria city limits.

The first brick structure, known as the Church of Saint Mary, was built at Church and South Washington streets. The chapel's cornerstone was laid in 1795, and work continued in 1796, according to letters from Archbishop John Carroll of Baltimore.

A plaque at the church states:

In grateful acknowledgement of their aid in establishing this church the three trees to the north of this stone have been dedicated as follows to General George Washington as subscriber to the building, Colonel John Fitzgerald, his favorite aide de camp, as the collector of the building fund, Colonel Robert Hooe, mayer of Alexandria, as the donor of the acre of land.

== Second church ==
In 1810, the parish purchased land closer to the center of Alexandria for a new church. By 1827, Reverend Father Joseph W. Fairclough, the pastor, had erected the sanctuary and the major portion of the present church at 310 South Royal Street.

The church is located within the Alexandria Historic District, a historic district encompassing Old Town Alexandria and adjoining areas. The district was listed on the National Register of Historic Places and designated a National Historic Landmark District on November 13, 1966, under reference number 66000928.

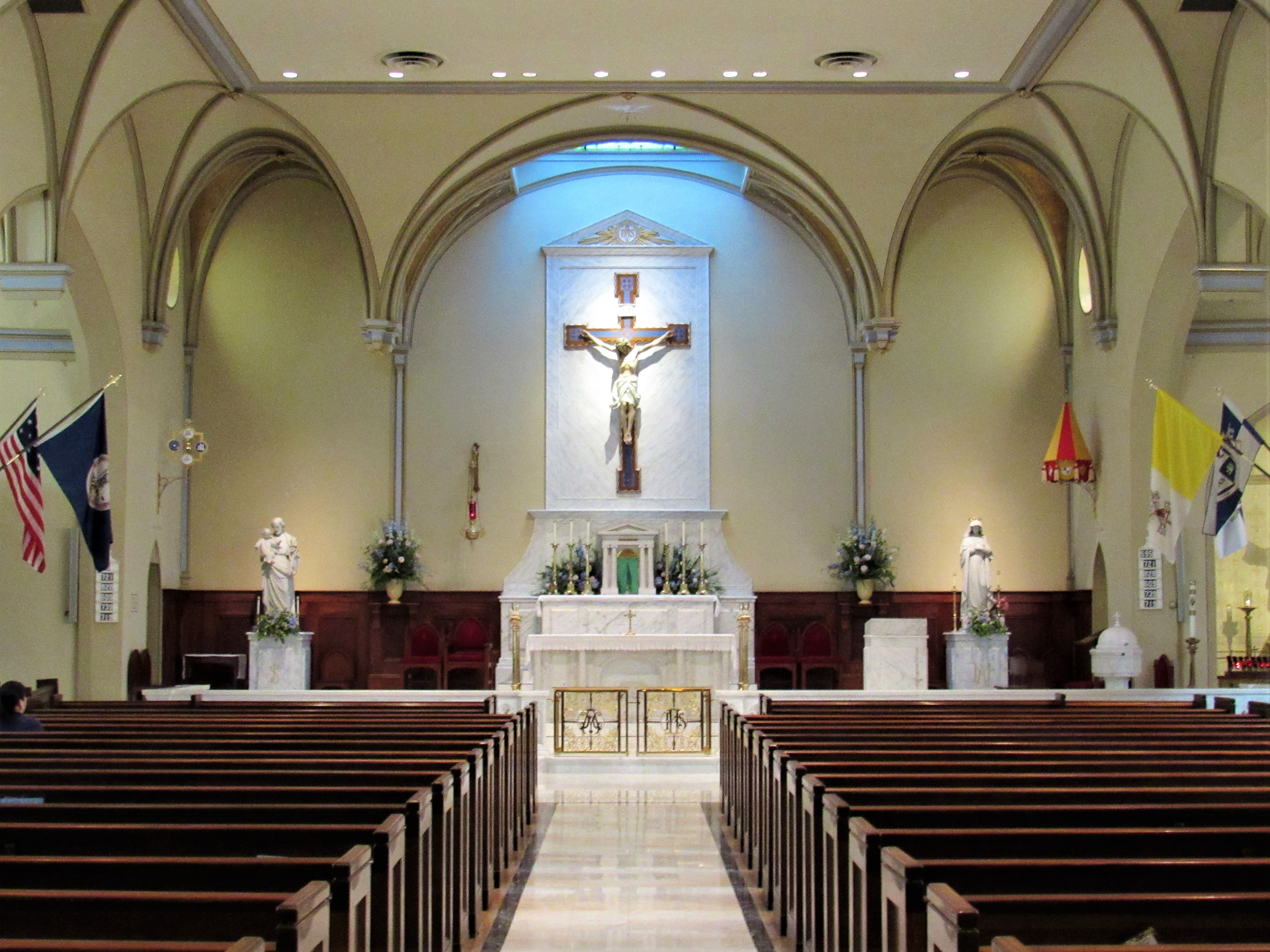
Main nave toward altar

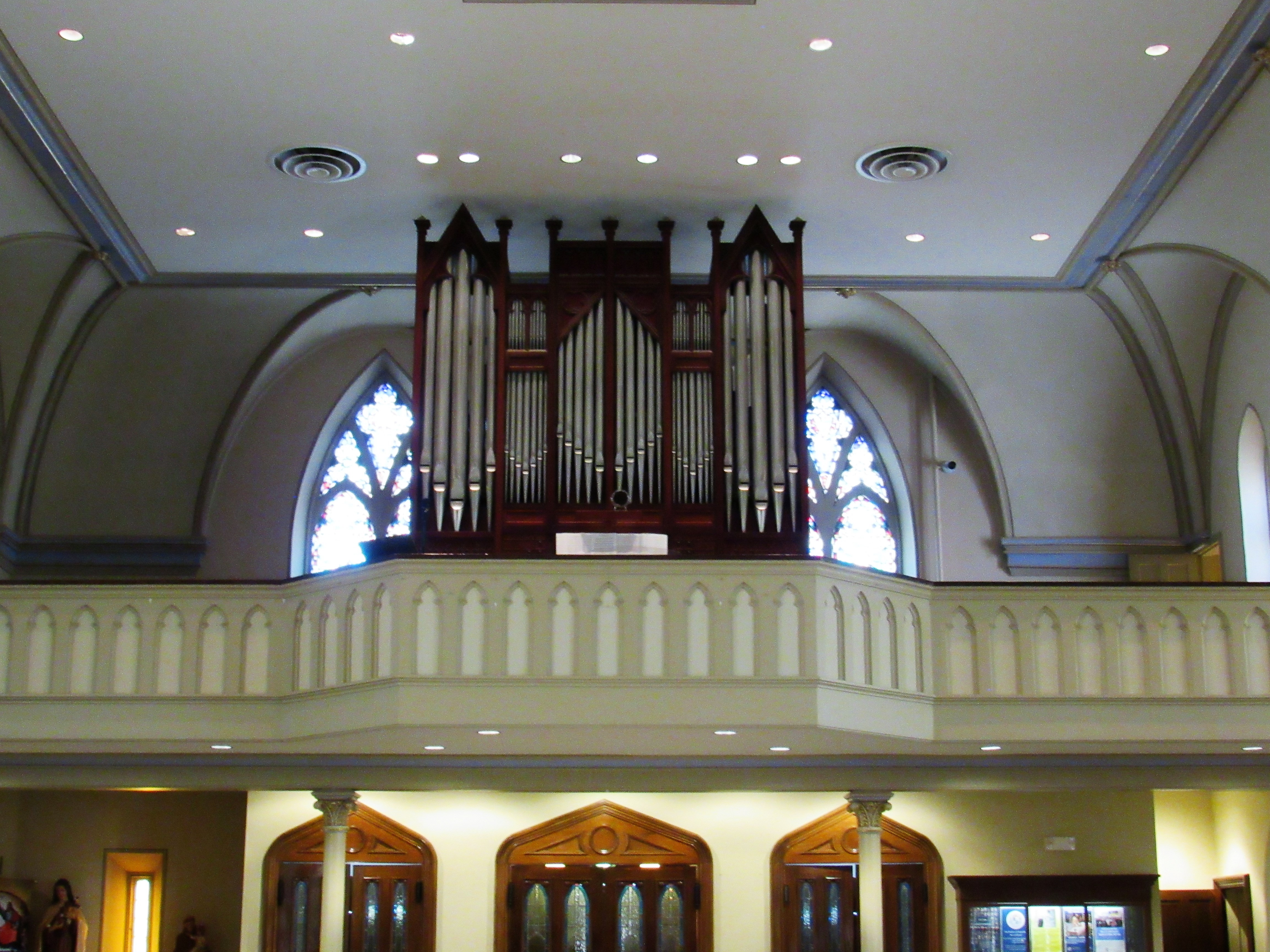
Pipe organ

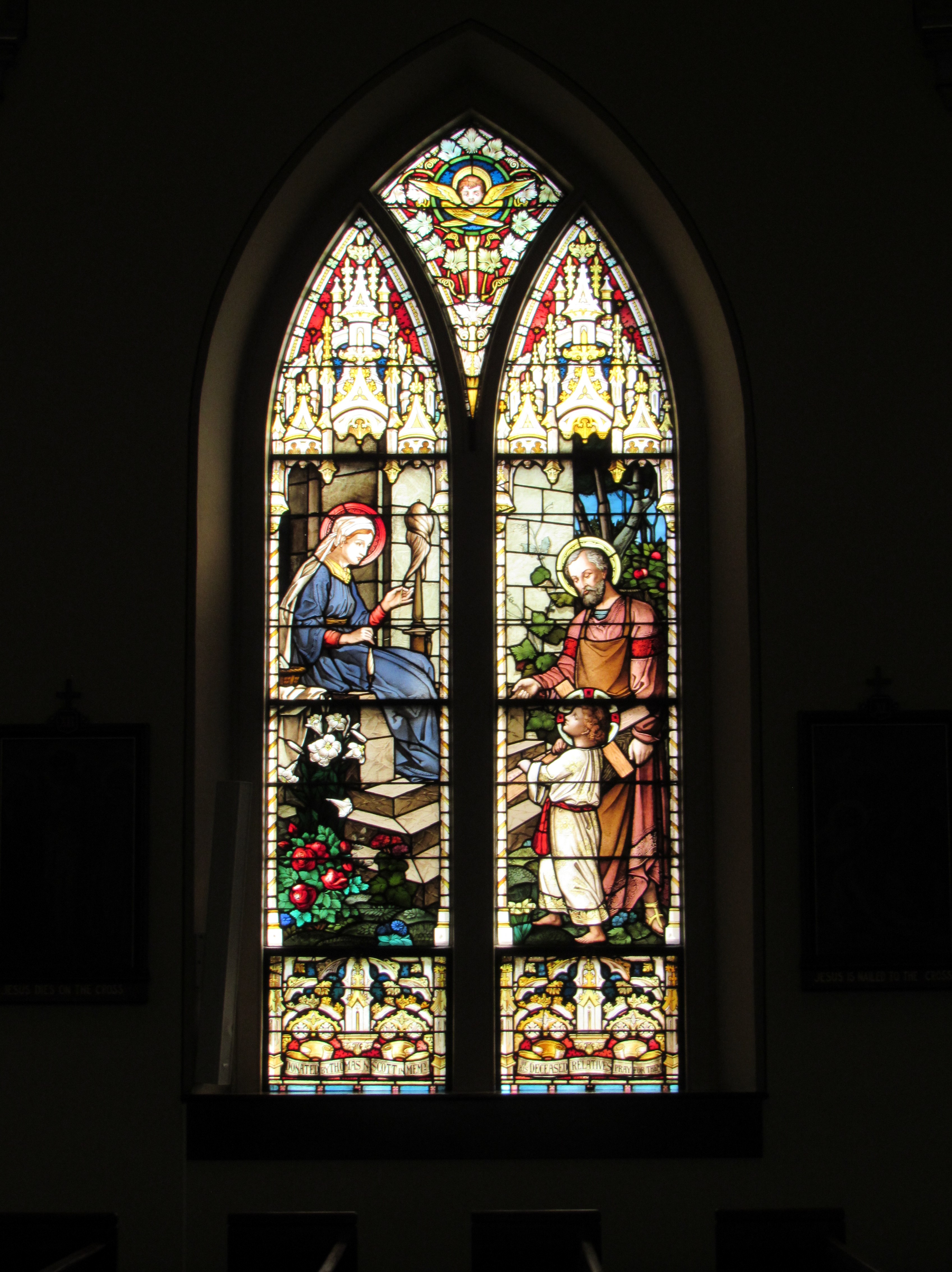
Stained glass window

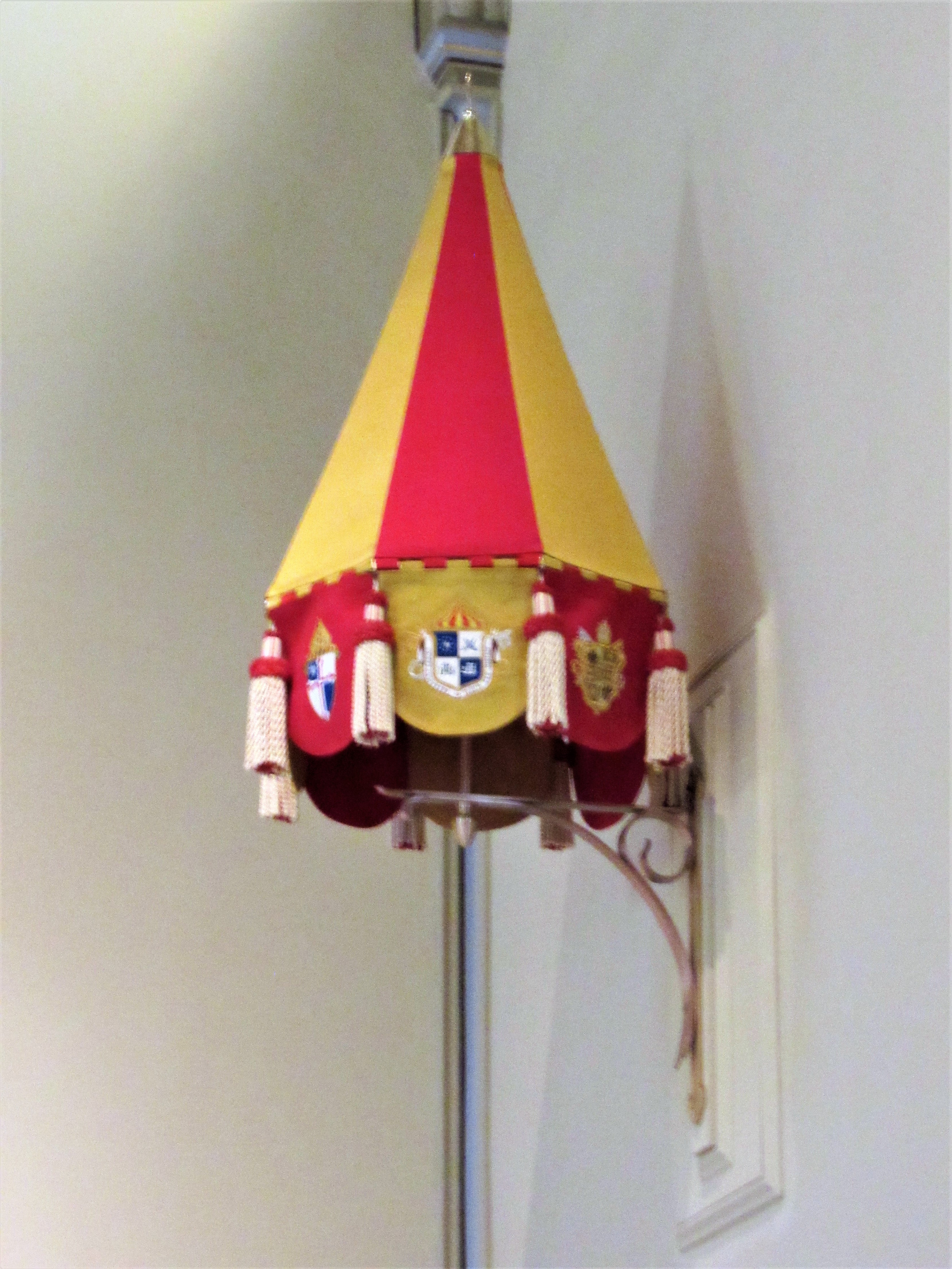
Umbraculum

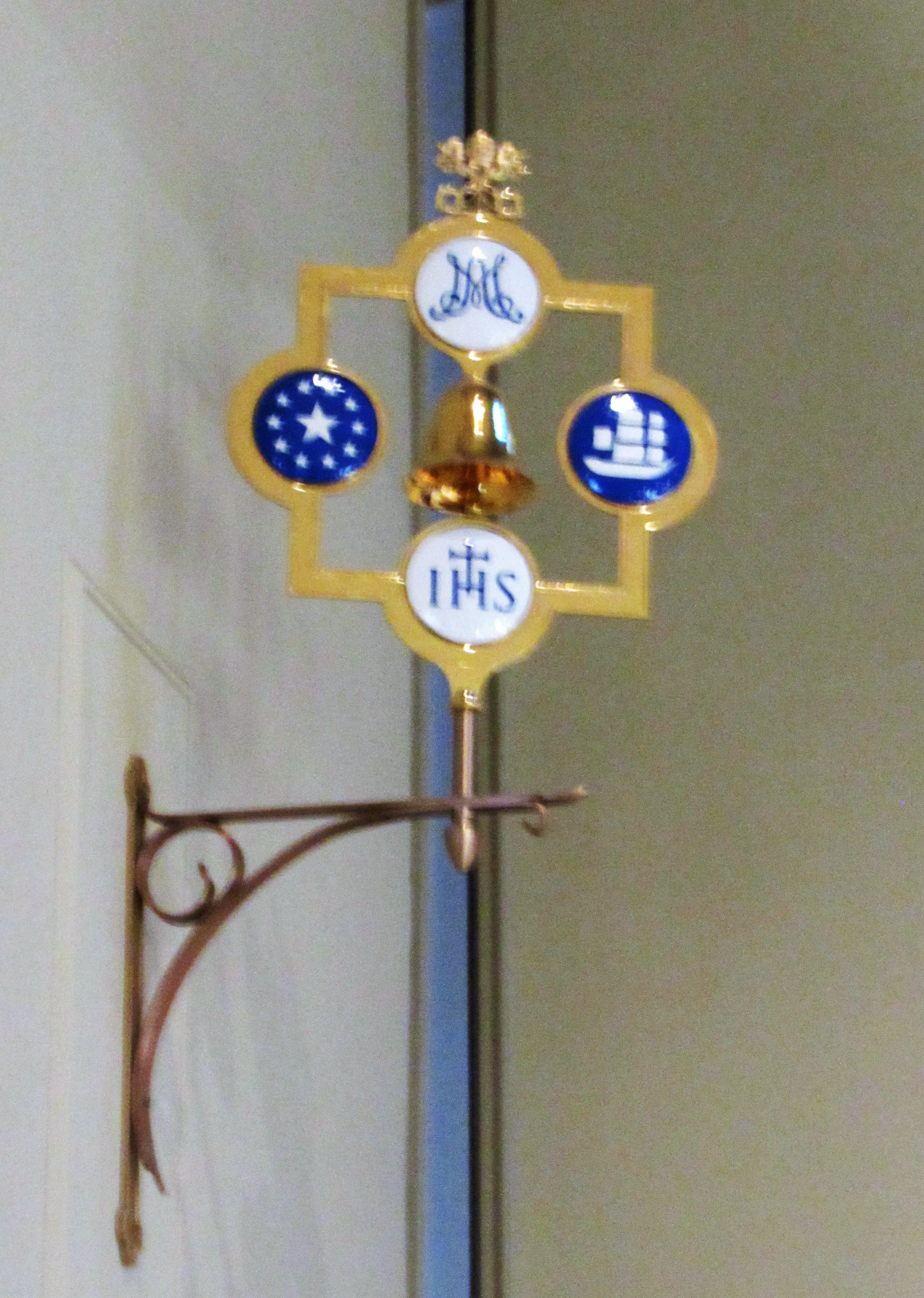
Tintinnabulum

== Cemetery ==
In the 1830s, the original chapel was demolished, and its bricks were used to build the Alexandria Lyceum. The land where the original chapel stood became St. Mary Cemetery, the first Catholic cemetery in the Commonwealth of Virginia. St. Mary School was later added to the site.

Several Revolutionary War soldiers are known to be buried in the cemetery, although early burial records are missing. Alexandria historian Michael Miller, in Burials in St. Mary’s Catholic Cemetery 1799–1983, identified the first known burial in the cemetery as Caven Boa, who died on August 20, 1799. Boa was a member of the Corps of Artillery and was buried with full military honors, although the location of his grave is unknown. Virginia historian Wesley E. Pippenger, in Tombstone Inscriptions of Alexandria, identified known Revolutionary War soldiers buried at St. Mary's, including Private Lawrence Hurdle, who died in 1848 at the age of 98; Francis Ignatius Hagen, who died in 1830 at the age of 76; and Pierre La Croix, who died in 1830 at the age of 88. La Croix served in the French and Indian War under General Montcalm and later in the American Revolutionary War under General Montgomery.

The cemetery also includes the graves of many soldiers from other wars, including more than 40 soldiers from the American Civil War.

== See also ==
- National Register of Historic Places listings in Alexandria, Virginia
- List of Catholic basilicas
