= Sonneborn (Nuhne) =

River in Germany

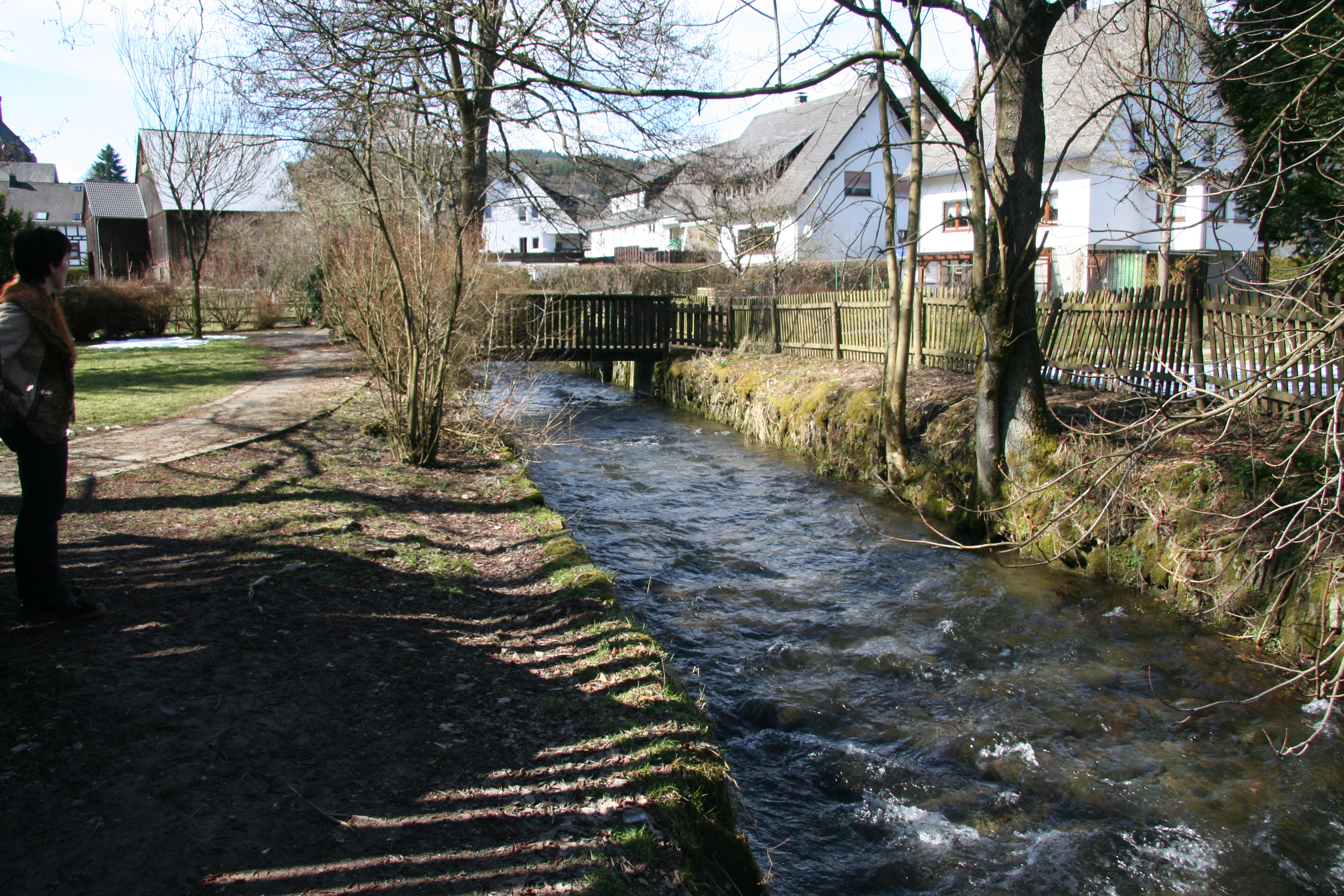

Location
- Country: Germany
- State: North Rhine-Westphalia

Physical characteristics
- Mouth
  - location: Nuhne
  - coordinates: 51.1790°N 8.5272°E

Basin features
- Progression: Nuhne→ Eder→ Fulda→ Weser→ North Sea

Sonneborn is a small river of North Rhine-Westphalia, Germany. It is 3.1 km (1.9 mi) long and is a right tributary of the Nuhne near Winterberg.

== See also ==
- List of rivers of North Rhine-Westphalia
