= Liese (Nuhne) =

River in North Rhine-Westphalia, Germany

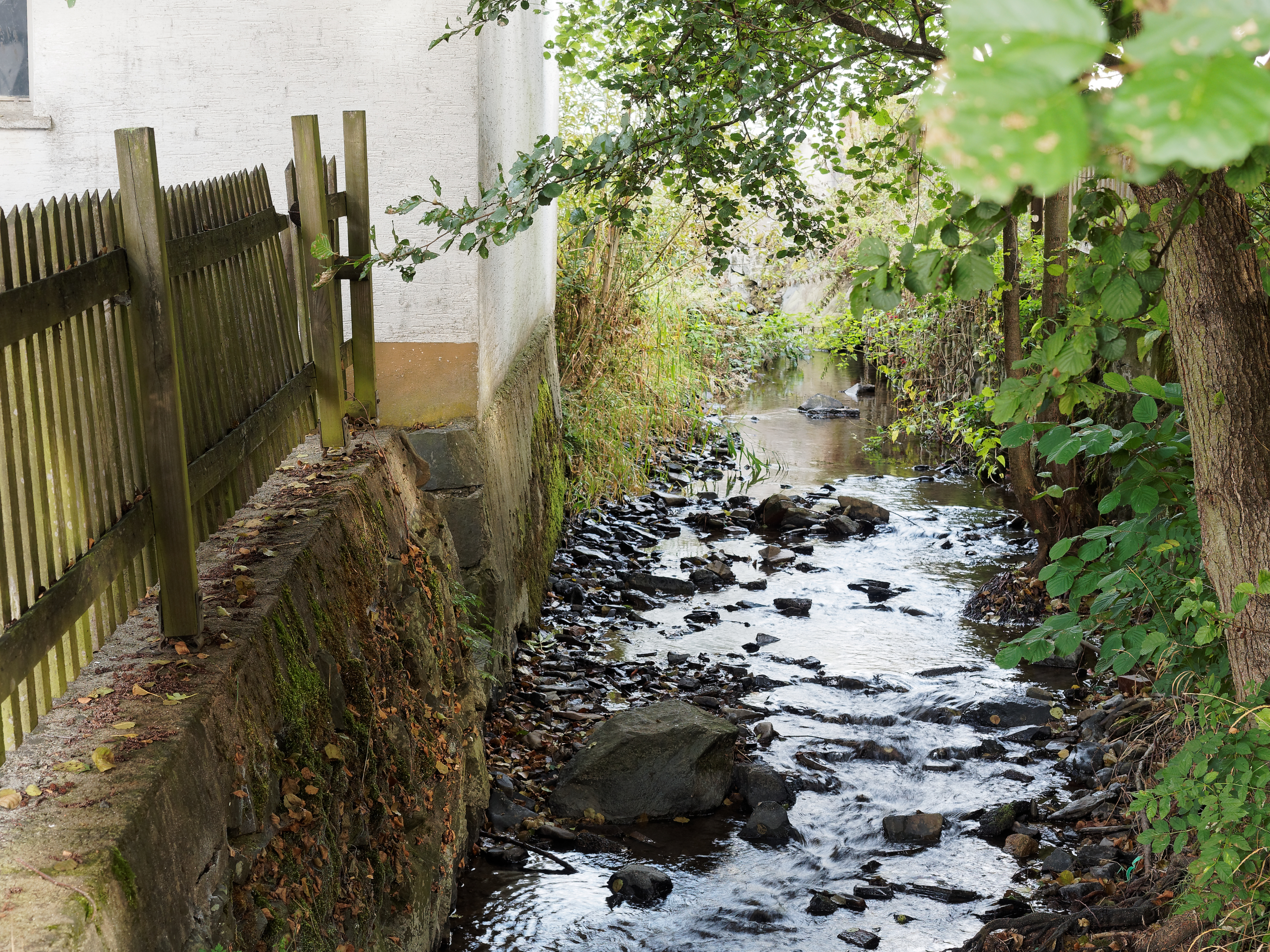

Location
- Country: Germany
- States: North Rhine-Westphalia

Physical characteristics
- Mouth
  - location: Nuhne
  - coordinates: 51.1253°N 8.6124°E

Basin features
- Progression: Nuhne→ Eder→ Fulda→ Weser→ North Sea

Liese is a river of North Rhine-Westphalia, Germany. It is 7.1 km long and a left tributary of the Nuhne near Liesen.

== See also ==
- List of rivers of North Rhine-Westphalia
