= Robert T. Hooe =

American military leader and politician (1743–1809)

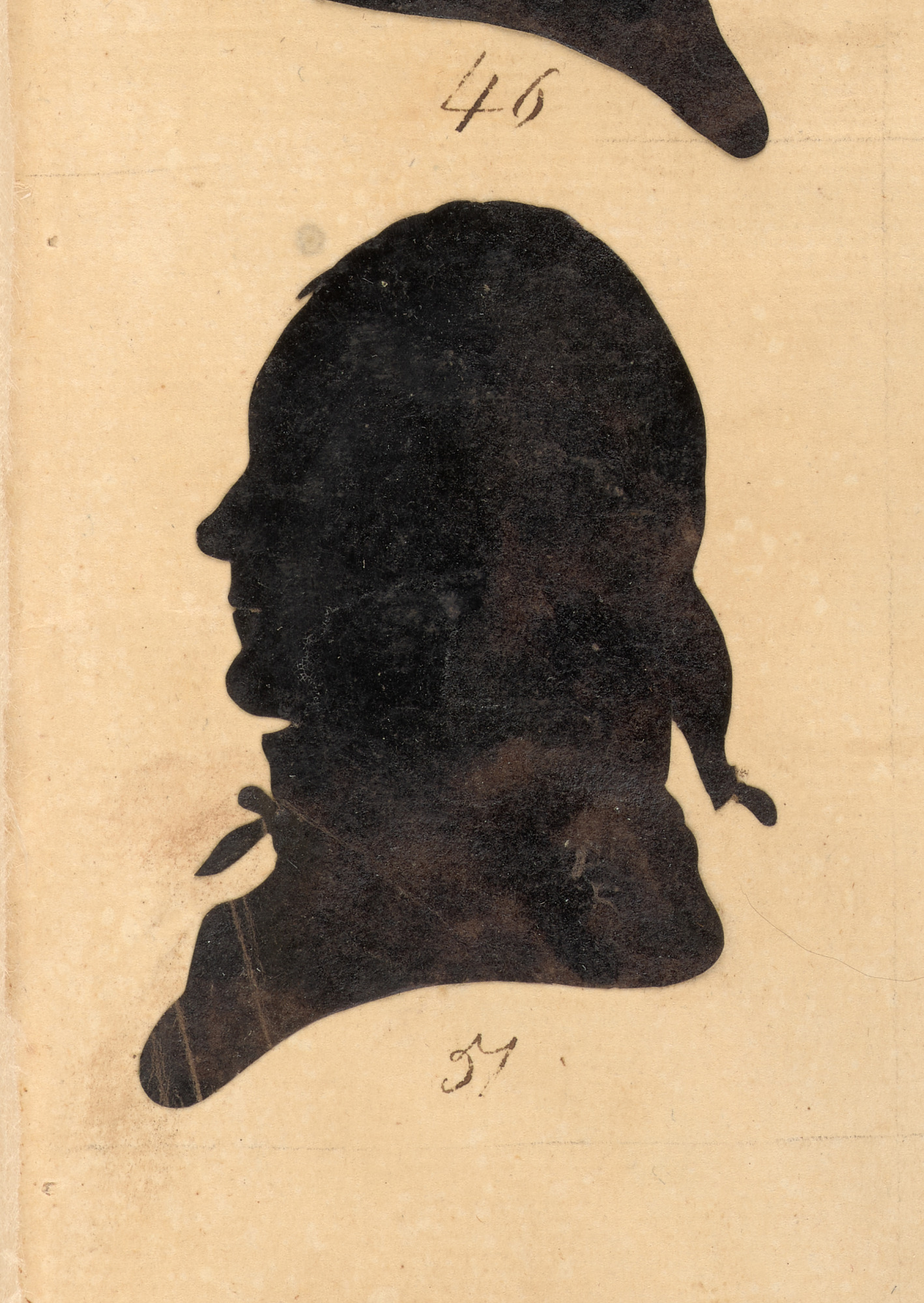
- silhouette by William Bache

Mayor of Alexandria, Virginia
- In office 1780–1781
- Preceded by: Office established
- Succeeded by: James Hendricks

Personal details
- Born: October 3, 1743 Maryland, British America
- Died: March 16, 1809 (aged 65) Alexandria, Virginia, U.S.

Military service
- Allegiance: United States
- Branch/service: Continental Army
- Years of service: 1776–1783
- Rank: Colonel
- Battles/wars: American Revolutionary War

Robert Townshend Hooe (October 3, 1743 – March 16, 1809) was an American Revolutionary War officer, businessman, and politician who served as the first mayor of Alexandria, Virginia.

== Early life ==
Robert Townshend Hooe was born in 1743 in Maryland, the son of Rice and Tabitha Harrison Hooe.

Beginning as a young adult, Hooe had numerous business ventures in Virginia and Maryland, including over 500 acres in landholdings and his merchant firm Hooe and Harrison. Hooe owned and enslaved seven persons above age 16 and also owned seven younger slaves.

== American Revolutionary War ==
Hooe served as a lieutenant colonel in the twelfth battalion during the Revolutionary War and attained the rank of colonel by 1781. He also owned privateers during the war.

== Political career ==
In 1766, Hooe was elected Deputy Surveyor of Charles County, Maryland. In 1774, he was elected to serve as a member of the committee of observation for Charles County. From 1774 until 1776, Hooe was an elected delegate to the Maryland Constitutional Convention representing Charles County.

After the Town of Alexandria was formally incorporated in 1779, Hoee became the town's first mayor in 1780 and served until 1781. He continued his military service during his time as mayor, and later served multiple terms on the city council and hustings court until 1786. Beginning in 1790, Hooe served as the High Sheriff of Fairfax County, Virginia.

In 1795, Hooe donated an acre of land that became the Basilica of St. Mary, the first Catholic Church in Virginia, and is recognized as one of the church's benefactors along with George Washington and Lt. Colonel John Fitzgerald.

In 1801, President John Adams appointed Hooe as a justice of the peace for the District of Columbia during the final days of his time in office. Hooe's was one of the many appointments that was the subject of the 1803 Marbury v. Madison Supreme Court case.

== Death and legacy ==
A few years before he died Hooe was the defendant in the case United States v. Hooe. Hooe died on March 16, 1809, in Alexandria, Virginia at the age of 65.
