= Lise =

Lise may refer to:

== People ==
- Eliseo Nicolás Alonso (known as Lise; 1955–2012), Spanish woodcarver and sculptor
- Claude Lise (born 1941), French politician from Martinique

== Given name ==
Lise is a variant of the given name Lisa

- Lise de Baissac (1905–2004), Mauritian secret agent of the Special Operations Executive in World War II
- Lise Cabble (born 1958), Danish singer and songwriter
- Lise Gregory (born 1963), South African tennis player
- Lise Hernandez Girouard (born 1975), Mexican-Canadian indoor skydiving competitor
- Lise Korsten (c. 1959), South African Professor at the University of Pretoria
- Lise Lindstrom, American operatic soprano
- Lise Magnier (born 1984), French politician
- Lise Mayer (born 1959), American-born English television and film writer
- Lise Meitner (1878–1968), Austrian-Swedish physicist
- Lise Müller (born 1974), Danish politician
- Lise Myhre (born 1975), Norwegian cartoonist
- Lise Petersen (born 2005), German Paralympic athlete
- Lise Revol (born 2008), French cyclist
- Lise Salvas-Bronsard (1940–1995), Canadian economist
- Lise St-Denis (born 1940), Canadian politician
- Lise Thériault (born 1966), Canadian politician
- Lise Thibault (born 1939), Canadian politician
- Lise Tréhot (1848–1922), French art model

== Other uses ==
- Lise, Široki Brijeg, a village in Široki Brijeg municipality, Bosnia and Herzegovina
- Lise with a Parasol, an 1867 painting by Pierre-Auguste Renoir
- The term for a secondary school in Turkey, derived from the French lycée; see Education in Turkey

== See also ==
- Liese (disambiguation)
