= Bronx Lyceum =

Coordinates: 40.8349°N 73.9035°W

The Bronx Lyceum was a building in the Bronx, New York City erected on the southeast corner of Third Avenue and 170th Street by Henry Zeltner in 1870 across the street from his brewery. The structure was at first known as Zeltner's Hall and was surrounded by a picnic park. Following the sale of the entertainment and meeting hall by the Zeltner family, the property was called Niblo's Garden, a familiar name borrowed from an early New York opera house on Broadway, near Prince Street that was razed in 1895. The building was used as a meeting hall by politicians and union members, and served variously as an entertainment hall, skating venue, and amusement park until its destruction by fire in 1929.

== Noted activities ==
Judge William Jay Gaynor and the principal Tammany Hall political machine nominees spoke at a public meeting under the auspices of the Taxpayers’ Protective Union, held at Niblo's Garden, 170th Street and Third Avenue, on October 28, 1909, and on October 21, 1913, mayoral candidate John A. Hennessy spoke to a Niblo's Garden audience of more than 3,000, charging that Tammany candidate Judge Edward E. McCall bought his Supreme Court position.

A riot erupted at the hall and park on June 6, 1914, when more than 200 members of the Bronx Bakers and Confectioners’ Union were involved in late-night fight following the group's annual Summer Night picnic. Rioters used beer bottles and chairs as weapons during a disturbance that erupted in the open air garden at the rear of the dance hall. Several injuries were reported both by bakers and responding Sheriff Deputies, but no one was hospitalized. A December 17, 1916 fight at Niblo's Garden led to a panic among some 500 dance patrons when guns were fired and responding police were attacked. Six arrests were made after the incident, which apparently erupted when hall security officers told several youths to discontinue their “extreme styles of dancing.”

A 1920 disturbance involved fifty men battling for their garments in the coat check room at Niblo's Garden, the Bronx, resulting in a call to the Bathgate Avenue police station. The crowd was moved to the police station, where twenty-five stolen property complaints were made before the incident was finally sorted and garments returned to proper owners with the exception of a single missing coat.

A sales notice in July, 1922 transferring the property to Assets Funding Corporation described Niblo's Garden as “fronting 92 feet on Third Avenue and 323 feet on East 170th by 170 feet in depth. It consists of about sixteen lots with a three-story building, 92 by 150, which will be used for an entertainment hall, skating, amusement park, etc.” However, an August 5, 1922 announcement marked the sale of Niblo's Garden at the “southeast corner of Third Avenue and 170th Street” by W. C. Reeves & Co. to the newly formed corporation “Claremont Palace Garden, Inc., which will continue it as a dancing place,” under the incorporators, Donato Piciulo, Joseph Blum, and George Axelrad.

In 1924 French societies in New York celebrated Bastille Day, July 14, at the Bronx Lyceum. French war veterans and all French societies of the metropolitan district, thirty-five in all, organized the event.

The Starlight Athletic Club sponsored an amateur boxing tournament in the building in October 1926. A program of ten bouts, which included New York bantamweight champion Eddie Reid, was held.

Following a walkout called by Allied Council of Cleaners and Dyers in February 1928, union organization meetings were held in many locales, including the Lyceum, and in July 1928 New York City supporters of William III of England marched to the building from Bronx Avenue, in celebration of the 238th anniversary of the Battle of Boynton. Political speeches were made followed by an evening of dancing.

== Destruction ==
Three firemen were burned by a fire which destroyed the Bronx Lyceum in an early morning blaze on March 3, 1929. The fire began around 3:45 a.m., several hours after a dance by the Lena Lang Circle of the Foresters of America had concluded. It threatened to spread to the warehouse of the Bronx Drug Company, where large quantities of chemicals were stored. The structure was described as being an old three-story wood and stucco, which was the cradle of the careers of many politicians. The smoke drove forty-eight families in the tenement across the way, at 581 East 170th Street, to the street. Firemen of Engine Company 50, stationed on the roof, wet the fire down.

The building was designed by architect Louis Falk, New York architect.
