= Lyceum–The Circle Historic District =

Historic district in Mississippi, United States

- U.S. National Register of Historic Places
- U.S. National Historic Landmark District
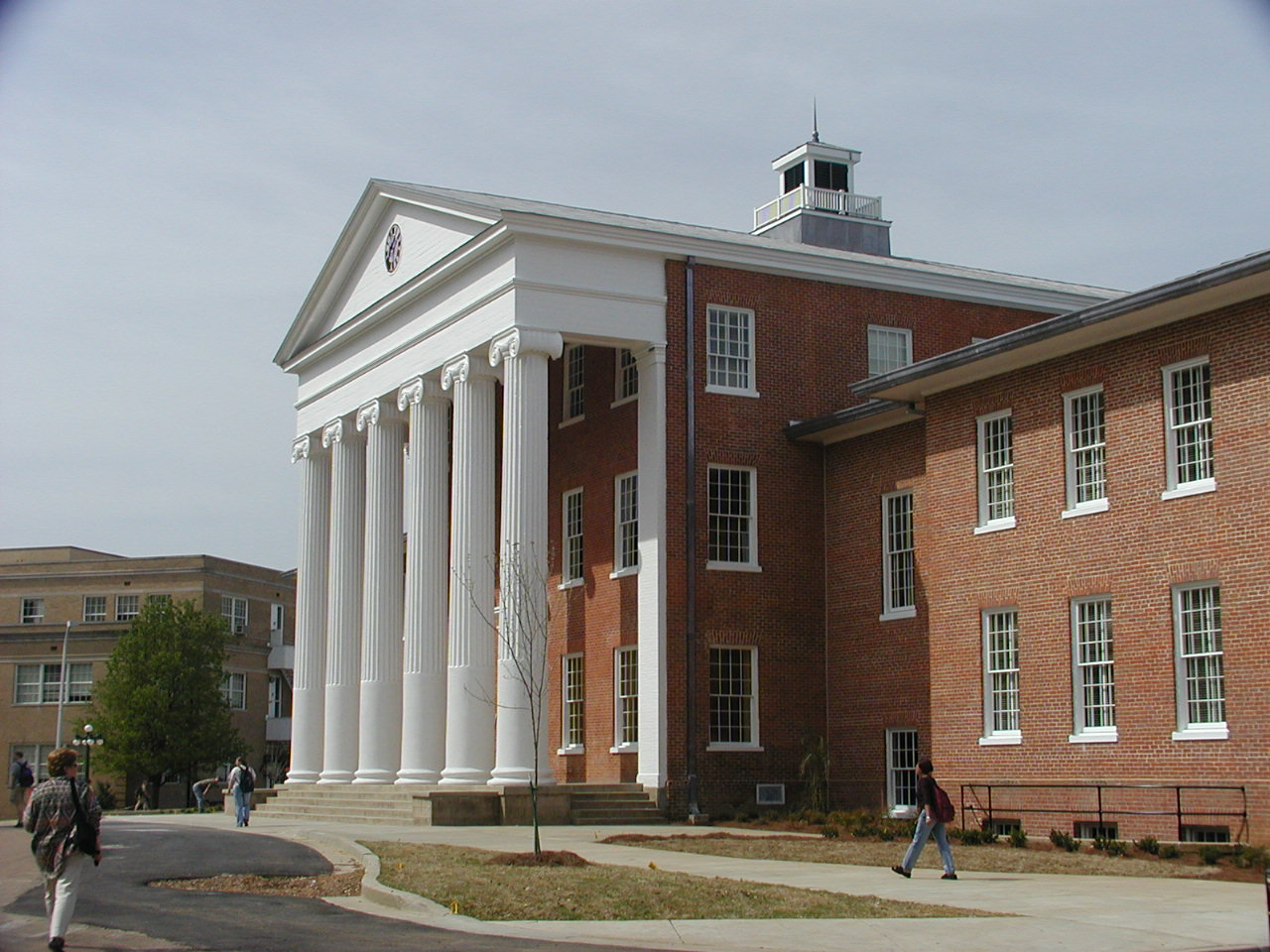
- Lyceum Building

- Location within Mississippi
- Location: University Circle, Oxford, Mississippi
- Coordinates: 34°21′57.6″N 89°32′5.7″W
- Area: 10 acres (40,000 m^{2})
- Built: 1848
- Architect: William Nichols
- Architectural style: Neoclassical Revival
- NRHP reference No.: 08001092

Significant dates
- Added to NRHP: October 7, 2008
- Designated NHLD: October 7, 2008

The Lyceum–The Circle Historic District is a historic district within the University of Mississippi campus in Oxford, Mississippi. It includes eight buildings and several monuments lining University Circle, and surrounds "The Circle" on the campus. The university was established as the flagship public institution of the state, and generations of leading families' sons and daughters have studied here.

The district is also significant for its association with the civil rights movement during the Ole Miss riot of 1962 and the increasing role the Federal government took to preserve constitutional rights of minorities. Ole Miss was integrated by the enrollment of James H. Meredith, an African-American military veteran, on October 1, 1962. In Mississippi in the fall of 1962, there was violent resistance to court-ordered desegregation of the university. The violence required intervention by the Federal government to protect the safety of citizens.

Meredith's admission was followed by riots on the campus, by both white students and outside segregationists who gathered there from around the state. The disturbances took place following court decisions for integration of public educational institutions, during the civil rights movement. This historic district was designated as a U.S. National Historic Landmark on October 7, 2008. (This may not have been announced publicly until October 14.)

== Elements of the district ==
Located at the center of the University of Mississippi campus, the district contains eight academic buildings arranged on University Circle, which encompasses an interior common area dubbed "The Circle," a historic site in the district. The eight buildings include the Lyceum Building, Brevard Hall, the Croft Institute for International Studies (known as the "Y" Building at the time of desegregation and earlier as the "Old Chapel"), and Carrier, Shoemaker, Ventress, Bryant, and Peabody dormitory halls. The district also includes the flagpole in the center of The Circle, the Confederate Monument in The Circle, and University Circle.

=== Lyceum Building ===
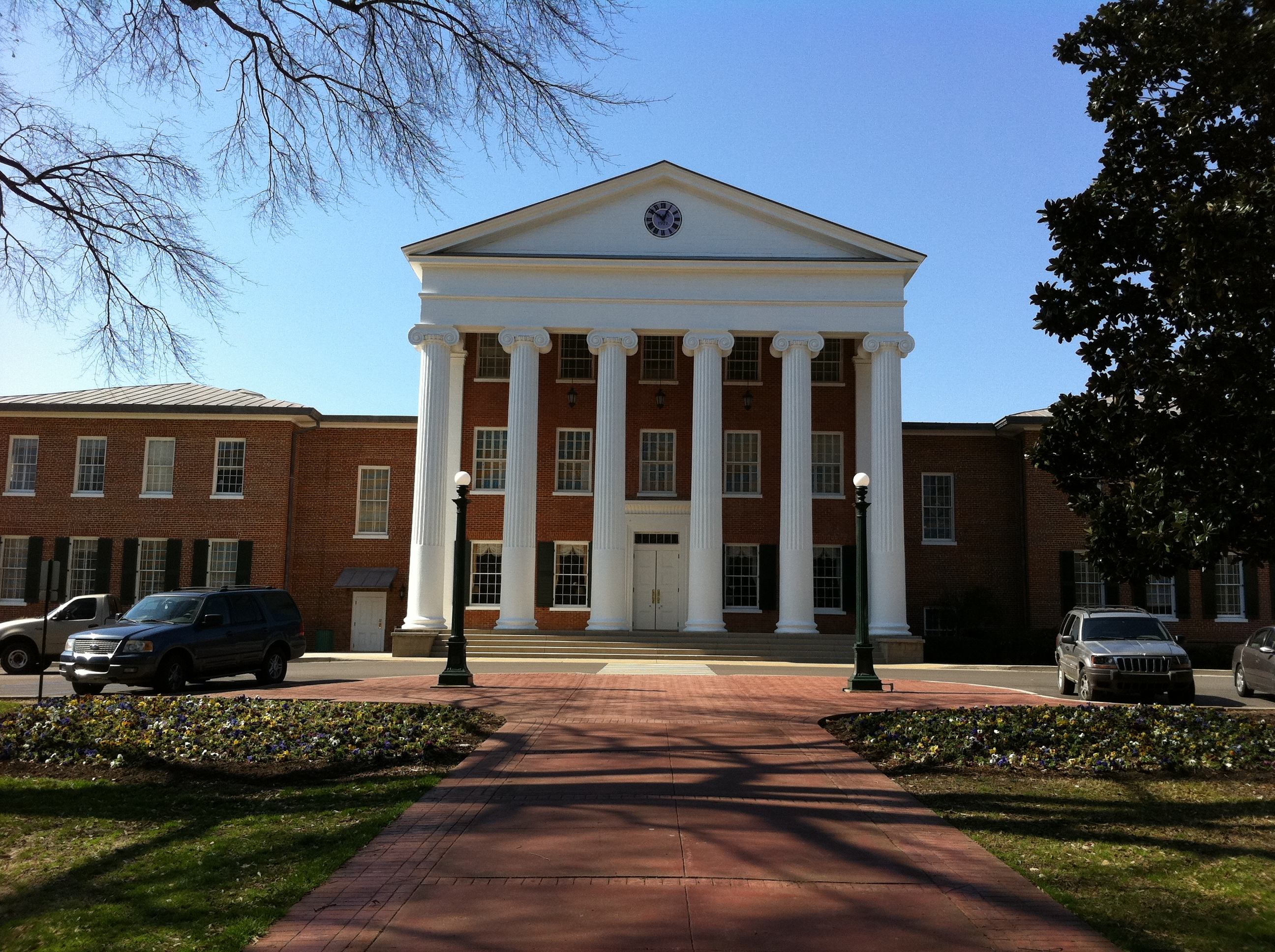

34°21′56″N 89°32′10″W

Construction on the Lyceum (referred to simply as the "principal building" of the university at that time) was begun in the spring of 1846 and was completed in the late summer of 1848, just in time to receive the university's first class of students. The building was originally the only academic structure of the university, containing a lecture hall, several lecture rooms, the faculty offices, a geological museum, and the university library. It was designed by famed southern architect William Nichols.

Today, the Lyceum remains the oldest building on the university campus. It now houses the university's administrative offices, including the offices of the Chancellor and the Provost. Its columned facade is represented on the official crest of the university.

=== The Circle ===
34°21′55″N 89°32′06″W

The Circle is surrounded by University Circle, a road designed for one-way traffic. The area contains oak and magnolia trees, beds of pansies, and expanses of grass. A metal flagpole stands at the center of the green, serving as a hub for the sidewalk paths through the area. Since the mid-nineteenth century, The Circle has been the focal point and historic core of the Ole Miss campus.

=== Flagpole ===
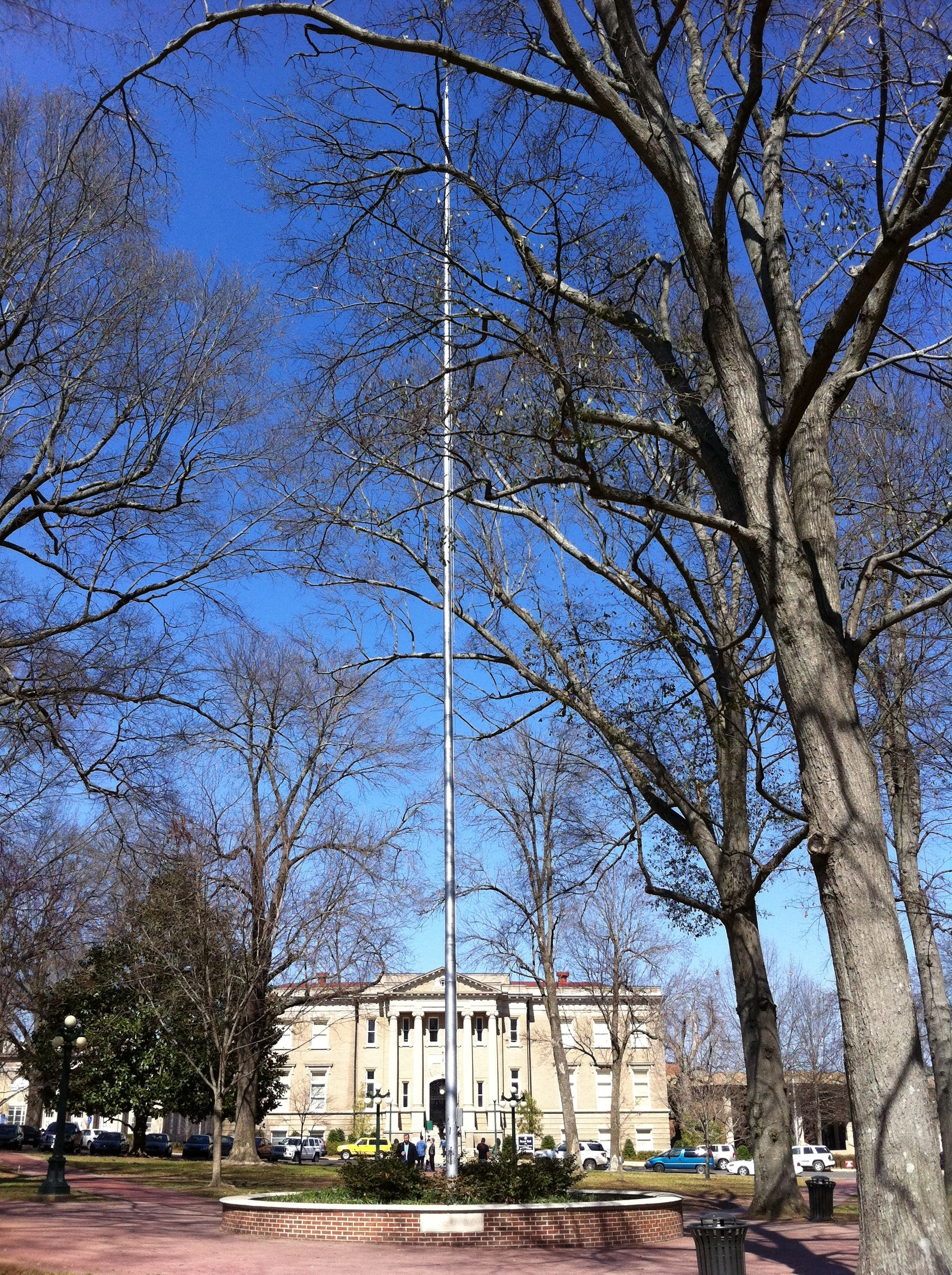

34°21′55″N 89°32′06″W

The flagpole has stood in the center of The Circle since 1962. Its brick base was constructed in 2000. During the famous desegregation riots, a former Ole Miss football player climbed the pole in an effort to attract rioters' attention and convince them to go home.

=== Confederate Monument ===
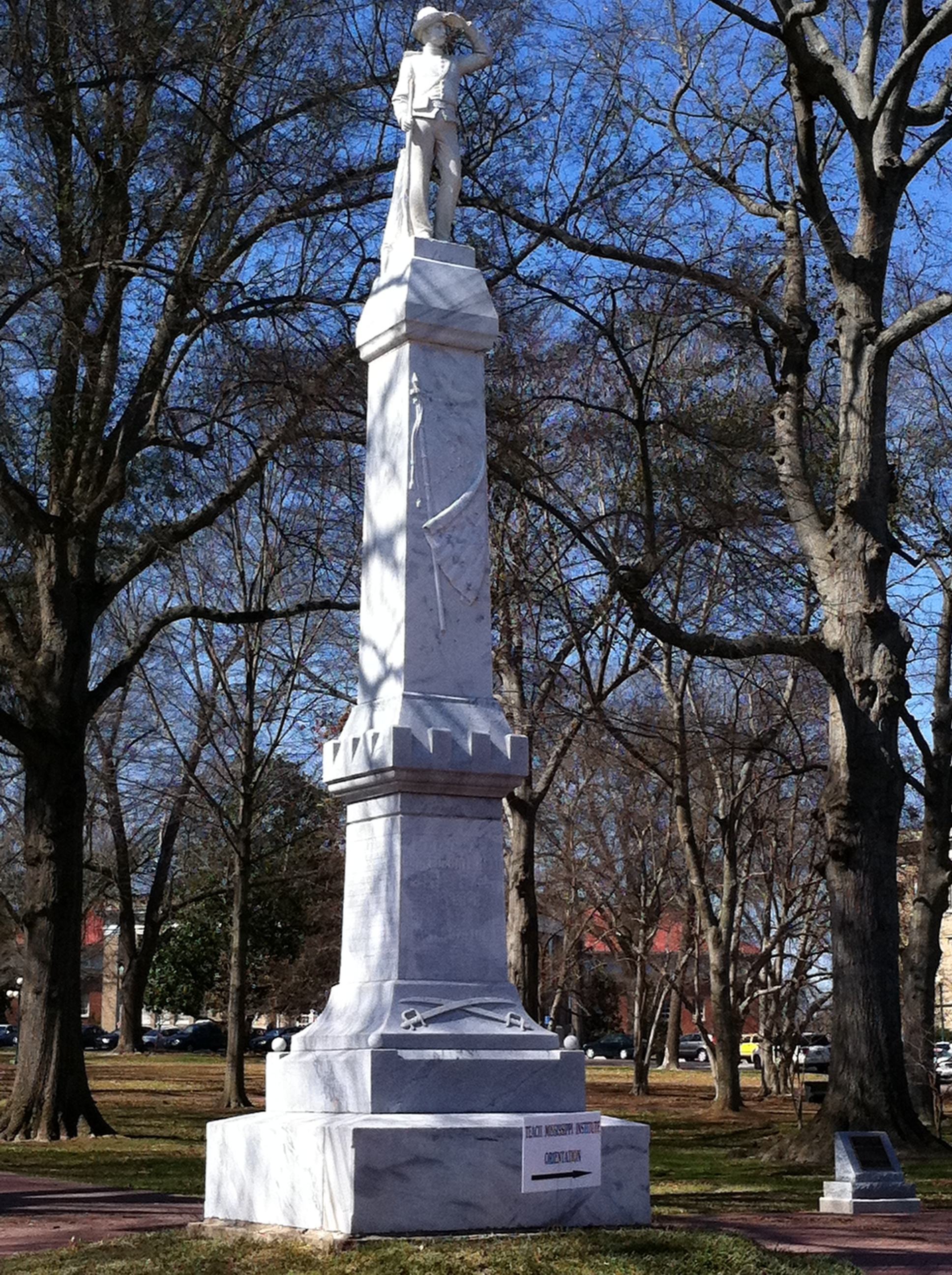

34°21′55″N 89°32′03″W

A contextual plaque now stands in the same position where the Confederate Monument stood from 1906 until it was moved on July 14, 2020. The Confederate Monument was moved to the site of a Civil War cemetery in a secluded area of campus. 34°21′39″N 89°32′22″W

The Confederate Monument contains a sub-column fashioned in the likeness of a castle, inscribed with the following: "To Our Confederate Dead, 1861-1865, Albert Sidney Johnston Chapter 379 U.D.C." (United Daughters of the Confederacy) and a Confederate soldier looking into the distance and holding a rifle at his side. It is often jokingly referred to by the Ole Miss and Oxford communities as the "second place trophy."

=== University Circle ===
34°21′55″N 89°32′02″W

University Circle is a 50 ft (15 m) wide roundabout with outlets between the "Y" Building and Bryant Hall, and on either side of the Lyceum, providing access to other parts of the campus.

=== Brevard Hall ===
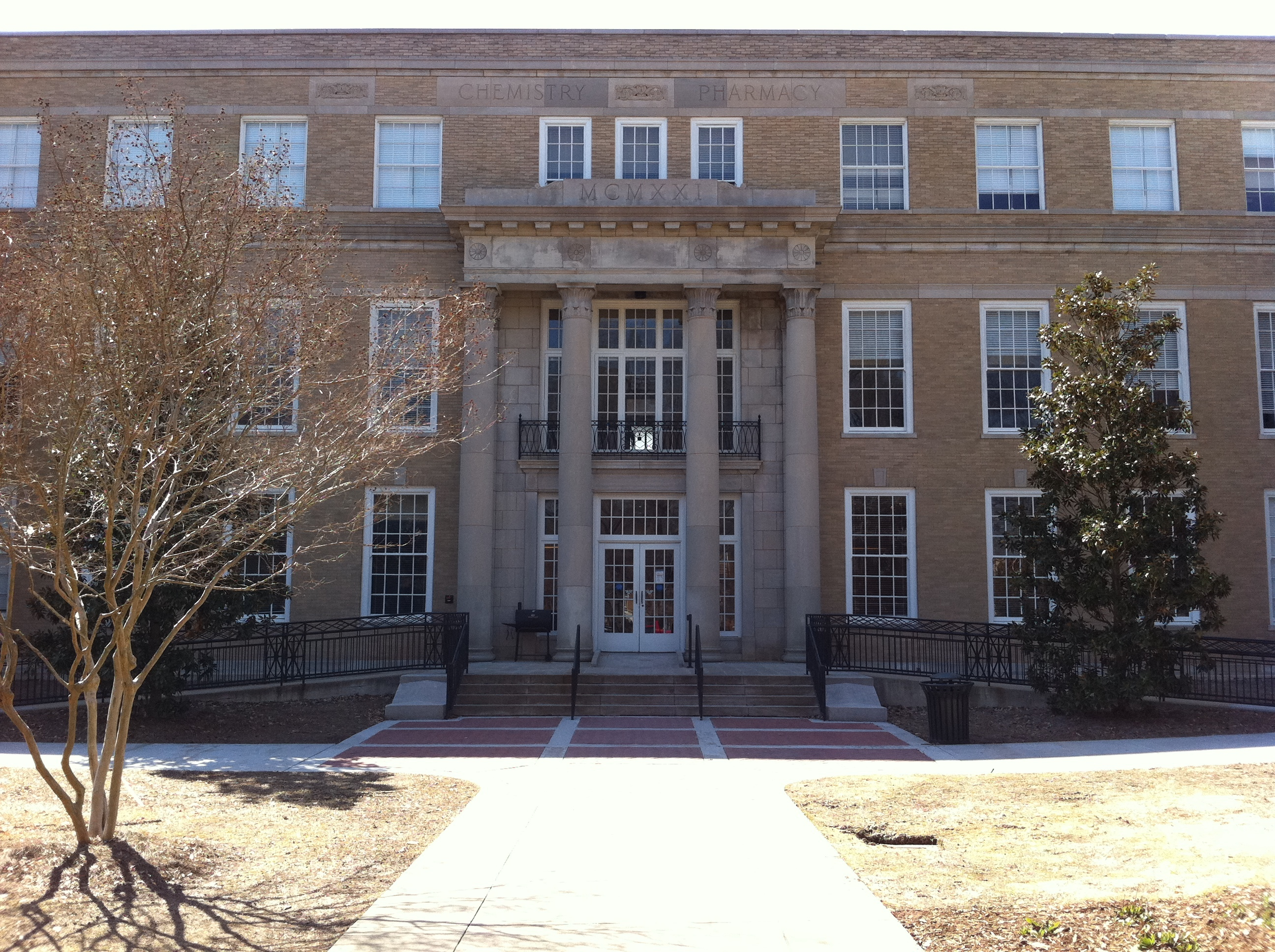

34°21′53″N 89°32′09″W

The Old Chemistry Building, now designated as Brevard Hall, was built in 1923. During the desegregation riots on September 30, 1962, students broke into the building and threw Molotov cocktail bombs from its windows at federal and civilian vehicles parked around The Circle.

=== Carrier Hall ===
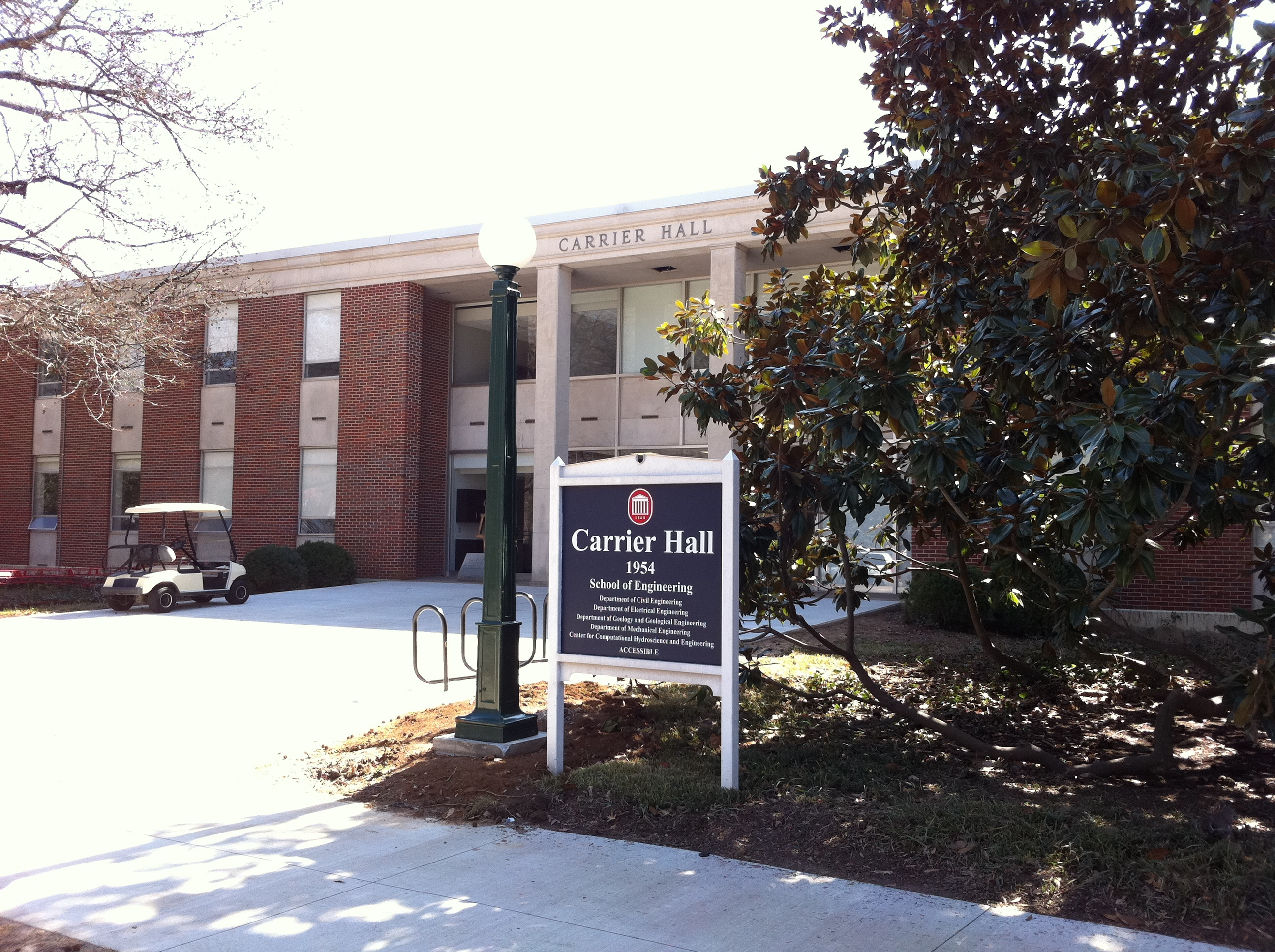

34°21′51″N 89°32′07″W

Carrier Hall was one of several buildings which students plundered for riot material in 1962. Branching off from the two-story main section is a rear section connected by two covered passageways. This section also contains two stories and is slightly inset and setback from the main section.

=== Shoemaker Hall ===
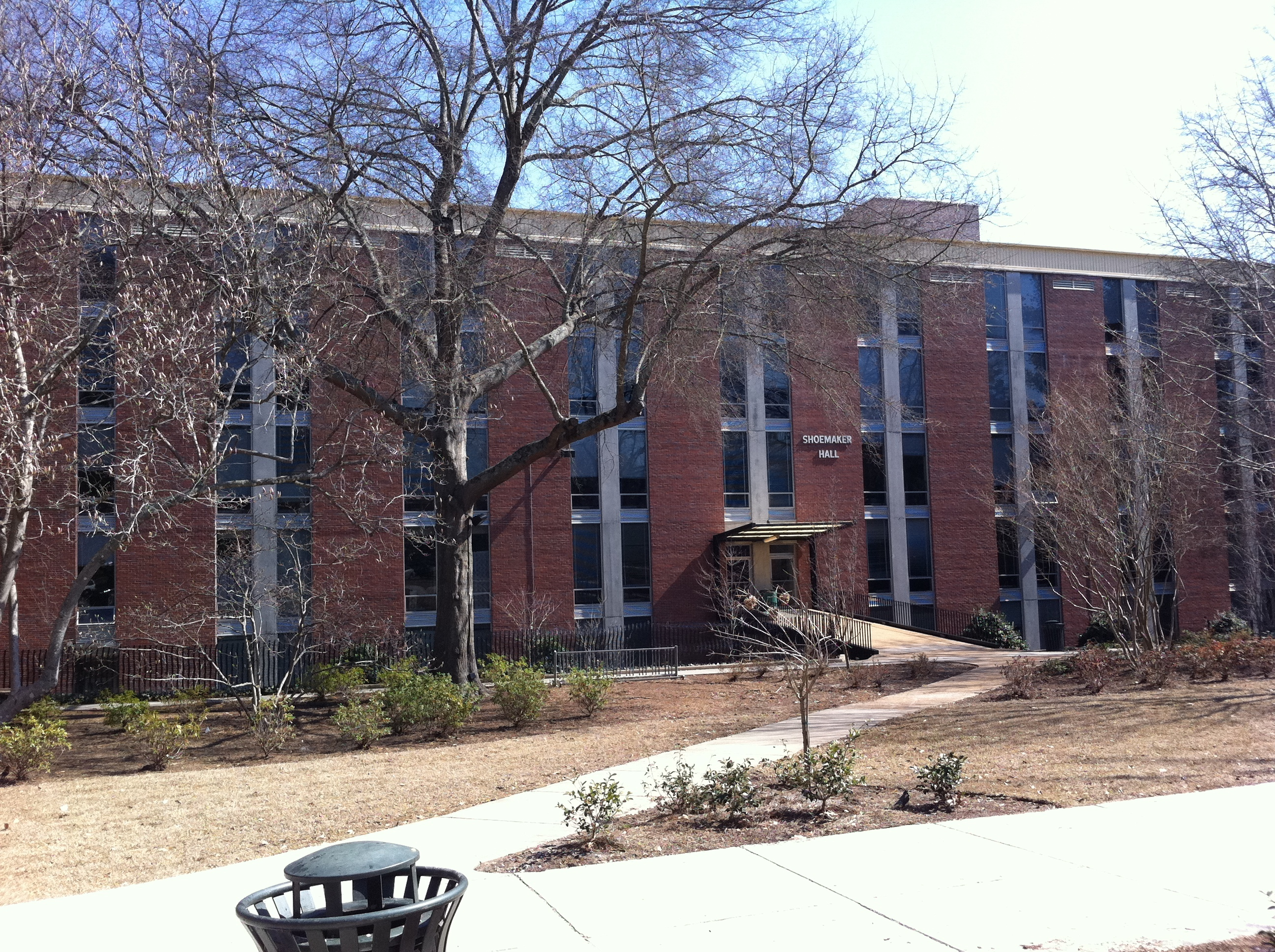

34°21′53″N 89°32′00″W

During the 1962 riots, four-story Shoemaker Hall was under construction. Students took up construction materials, including loose bricks, metal conduit pipes, and a bulldozer to attack federal officers. The dorm hall was the site of one of the two fatalities associated with the riots. Each of the men killed was shot execution style.

=== Ventress Hall ===
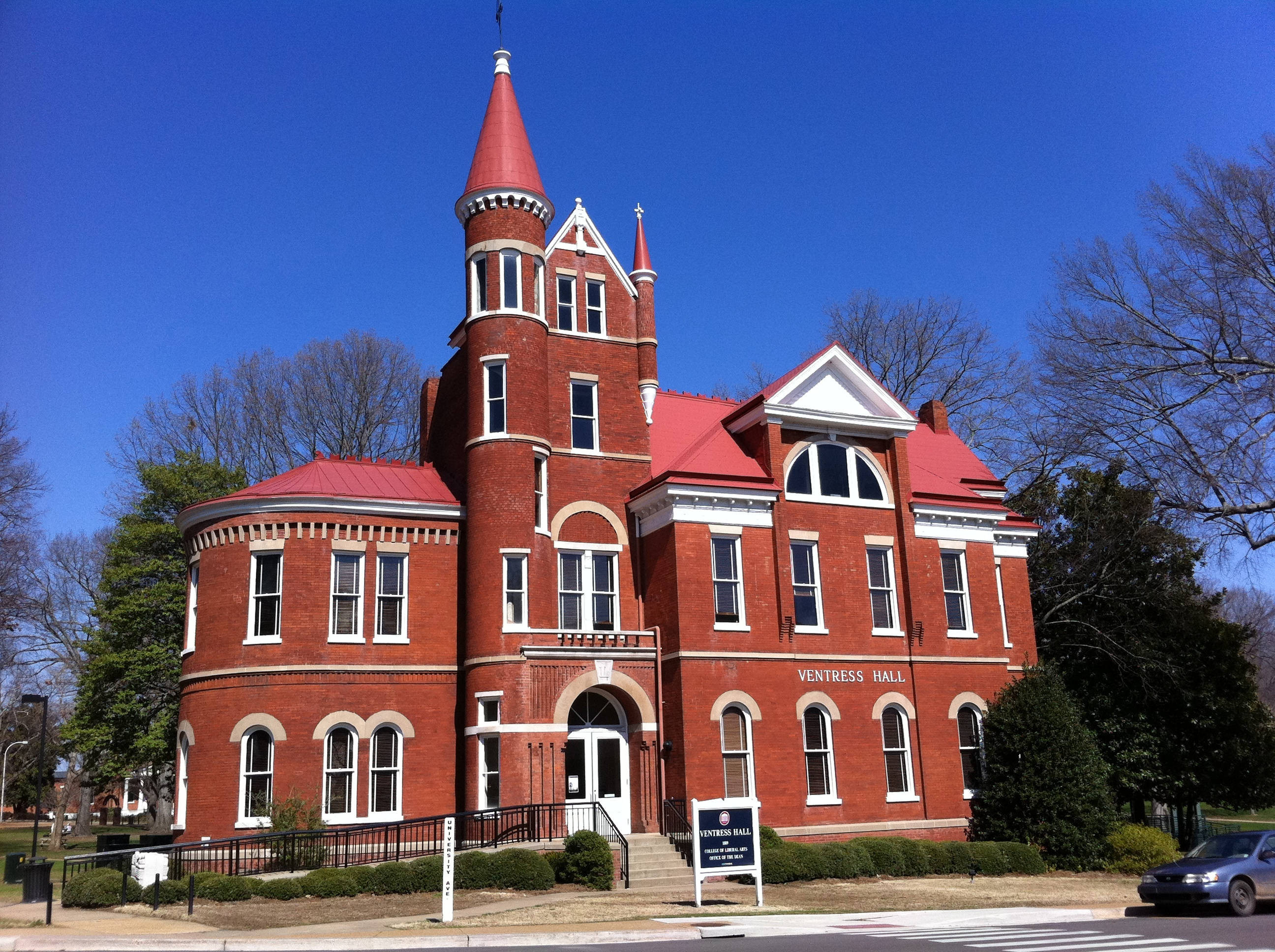

34°21′56″N 89°32′01″W

Two-story Ventress Hall, built in 1889, appears in a famous photo of James Meredith walking in the commencement procession on August 18, 1963.

=== "Y" Building ===
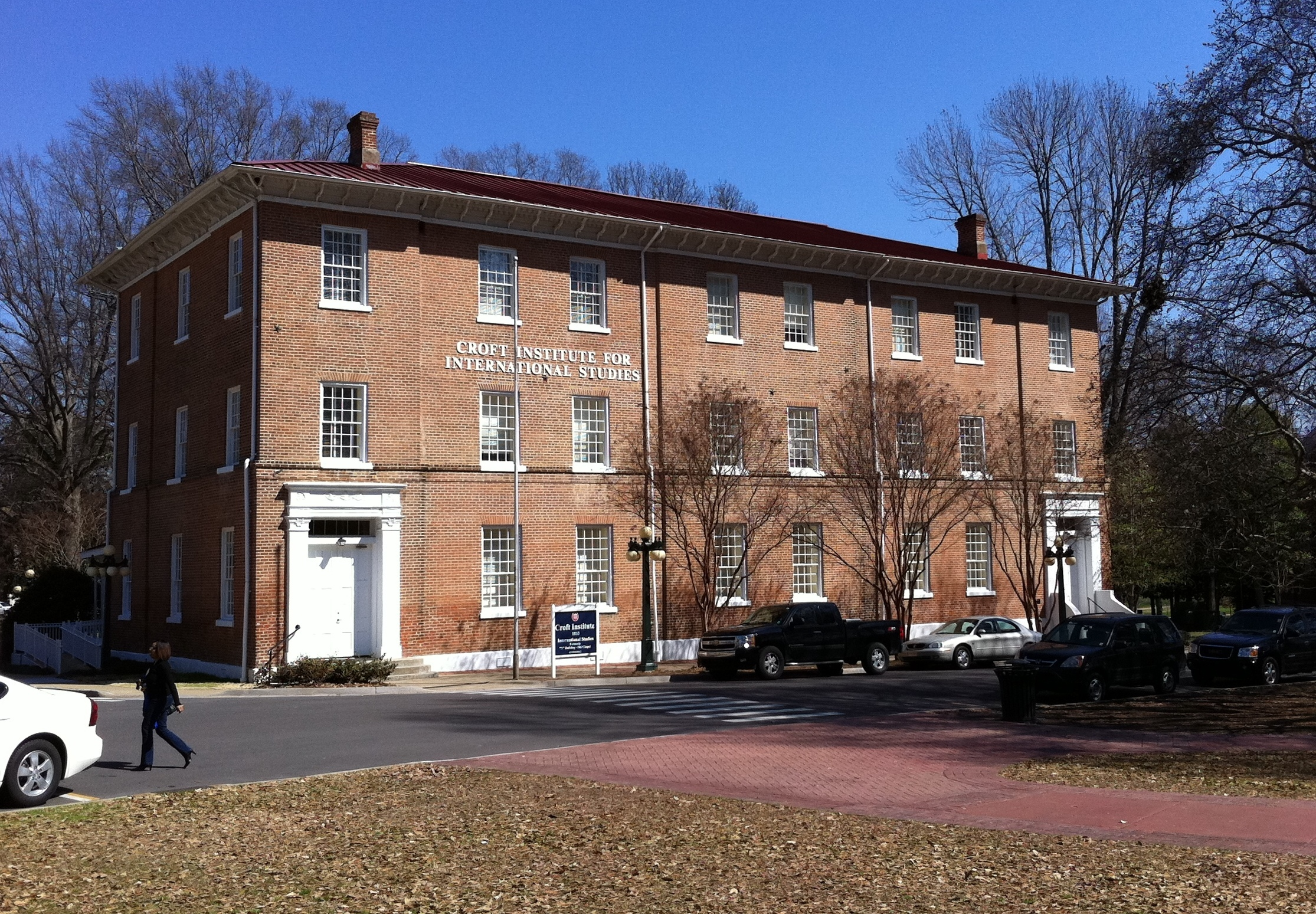

34°21′57″N 89°32′03″W

The Croft Institute for International Studies, known as the "Y" Building at the time of desegregation and earlier as the Old Chapel, in 1962 harbored many people escaping the tear gas and the general melee. Others crowded into the Y to watch United States President John F. Kennedy's televised speech regarding the desegregation of Ole Miss.

=== Bryant Hall ===
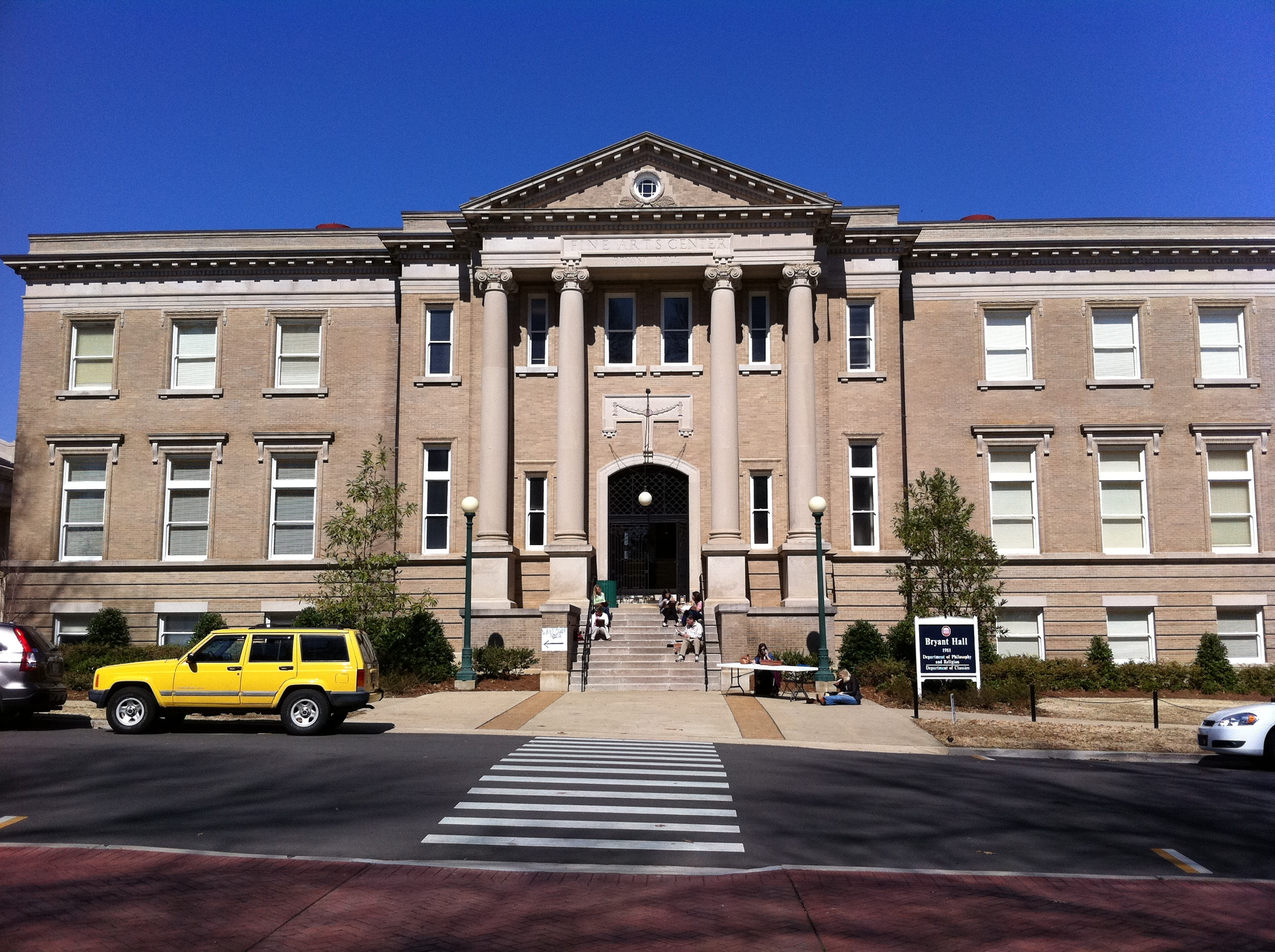

34°21′58″N 89°32′06″W

After housing the university's library from 1911 to 1952, Bryant Hall has been home to the Fine Arts Center and the departments of Philosophy, Religion, and Classics. During the riots, much of the pitched battle was fought in front of the hall.

=== Peabody Hall ===
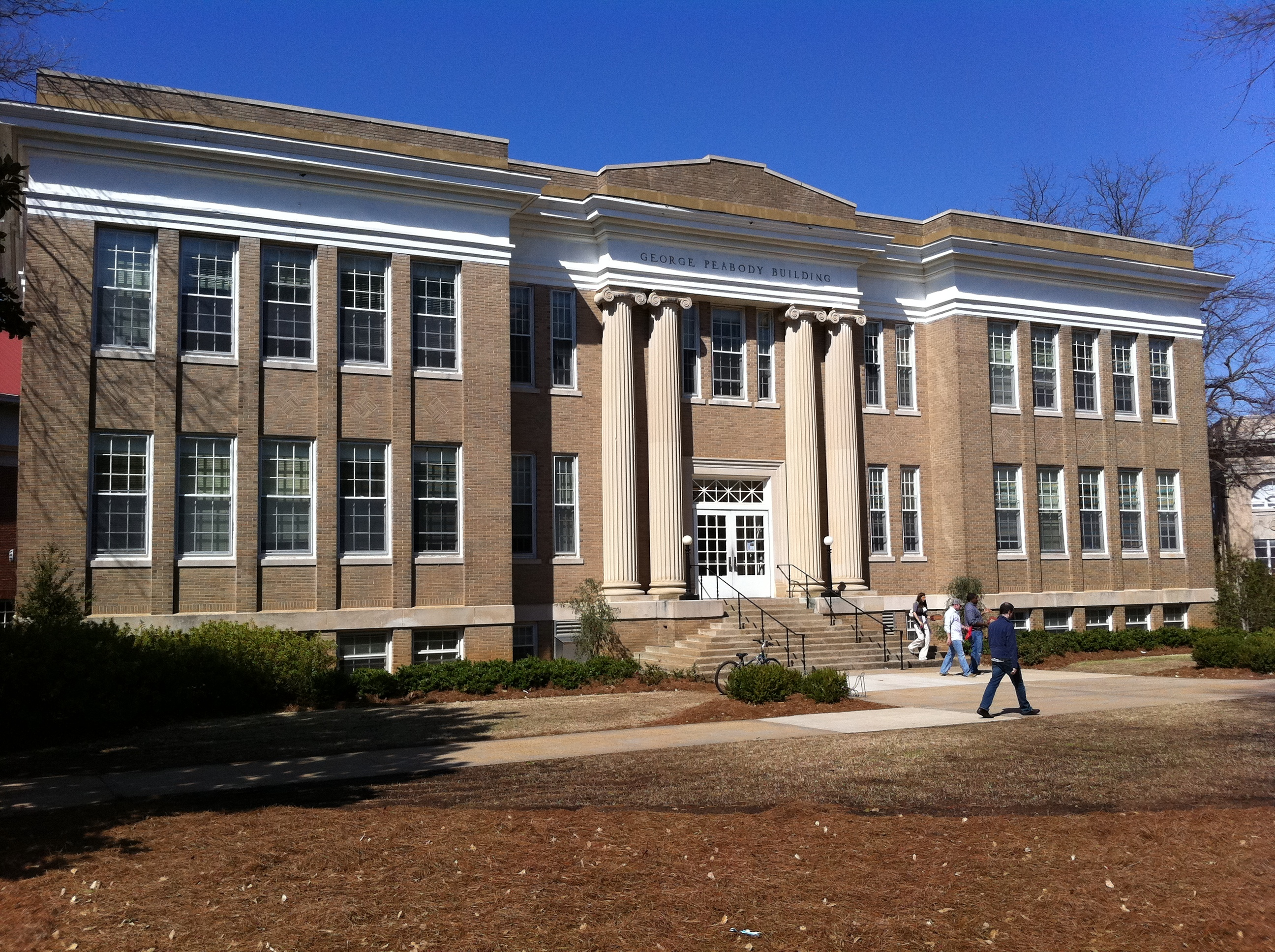

34°21′58″N 89°32′09″W

During the riot, Peabody Hall offered people a safe harbor from tear gas. While trapped in the building, faculty member Russell Barrett documented the riot.
