= Lyceum (software) =

Computer-mediated communication software

- The Lyceum interface
- Operating system: Windows 9x, Windows NT 4, Windows 2000 and Windows XP
- Type: Educational software
- Website: lyceum-taster.open.ac.uk

Lyceum is a synchronous computer-mediated communication (CMC) software which allows groups of people to speak to one another in real time over the Internet using Voice over IP conferencing.

Lyceum was developed at the Open University in the UK and was introduced into language tutorials in 2002. It also offers an interactive whiteboard (for writing, drawing and importing images, e.g. from the Web), a concept mapping device (for taking notes or writing short texts), a word processor (for jointly writing and editing longer documents) and a written text chat facility.

The software was written in Java, with some C code to integrate a third party native library used for the Voice over IP conferencing functionality.

The use of the software for language learning has been reported at different stages, from the pilot projects since 1997 (Hauck & Haezewindt, 1999, Shield 2000, Kötter 2001, Hewer and Shield 2001), to reports of the mainstream use (Hampel 2003, Hampel & Hauck 2004). Recent articles include task design (Rosell-Aguilar, 2005), tutor roles (Hampel & Stickler, 2005, Rosell-Aguilar, 2007), tutor impressions (Rosell-Aguilar, 2006a), and student impressions (Rosell-Aguilar, 2006b)
