= Leise Maersk =

Leise Maersk is the name for a number of ships that served with the Maersk Line.

- Leise Maersk (1921) (1921–1940) First diesel-powered cargo ship for Maersk Line
- Leise Maersk (1942) (1942–1972) Cargo ship, renamed in 1966 first as Brigantine and then Mitera Irene. Renamed as Camina Bay in 1969. Scrapped in Bruges in 1972
- Leise Maersk (1967) (1967–) Tanker, renamed in 1976 as Navios Patriot, in 1981 as Good Horizon and in 1984 as Bright
- Leise Maersk (1980) (1980–1995) Container ship for Maersk Line. Purchased by United States Navy in 1995 and converted to roll-on/roll-off ship and renamed as USNS Yano in 1997
