= Lyceum Theater (Clovis, New Mexico) =

- U.S. National Register of Historic Places
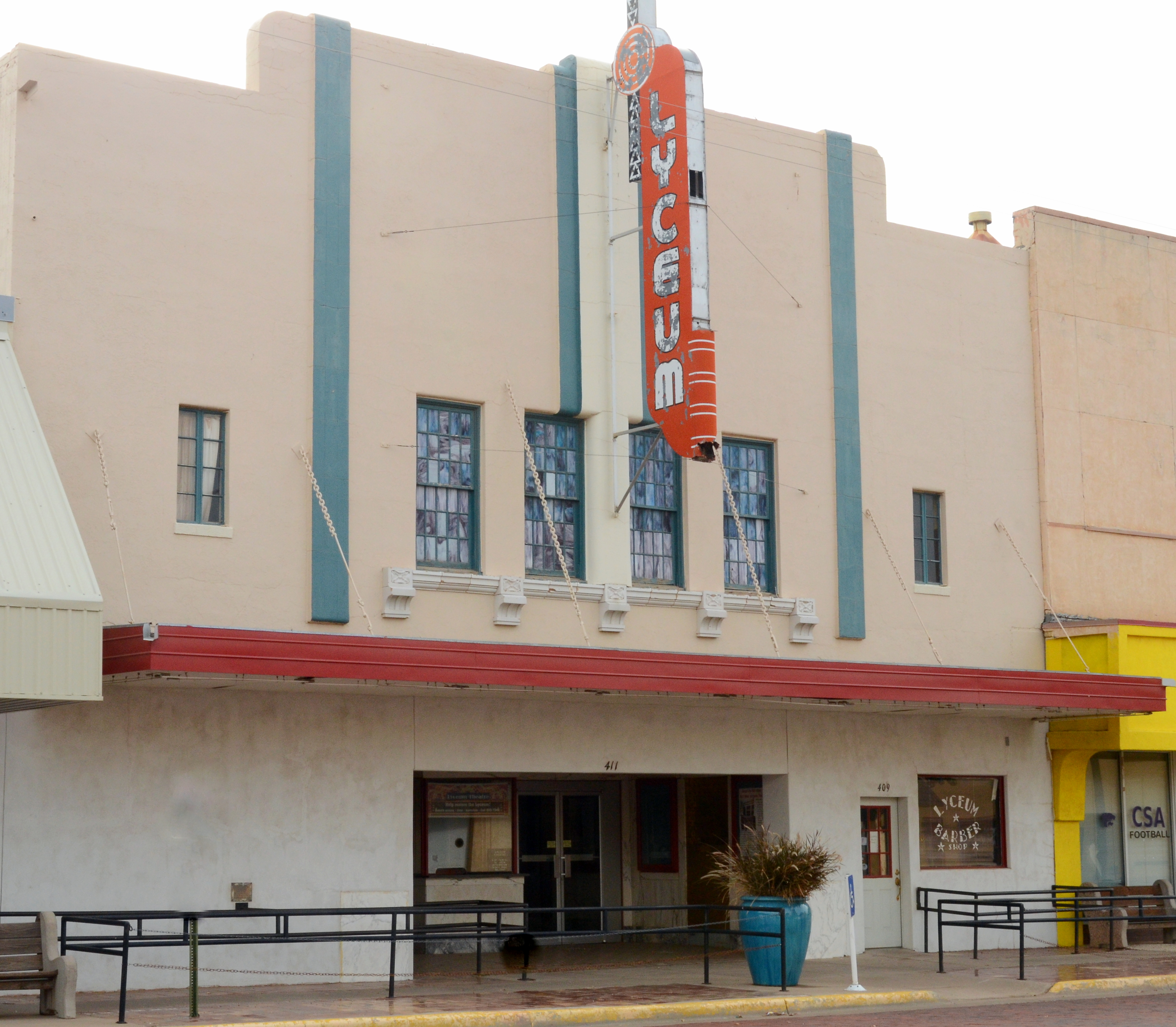

- Location within New Mexico Location within the United States
- Location: 409 N. Main St., Clovis, New Mexico
- Coordinates: 34.402274°N 103.204994°W
- Area: less than one acre
- Built: 1919-20
- Architect: Boller Bros.
- Architectural style: Moderne
- MPS: Movie Theaters in New Mexico MPS
- NRHP reference No.: 06001253
- Added to NRHP: January 17, 2007

The Lyceum Theater of Clovis, New Mexico, located at 409 Main St., was built during 1919–20. It was listed on the National Register of Historic Places in 2007.

It is a two-story concrete building with a vaulted roof which is hidden from street view by a stepped parapet. It has a 120-seat balcony. It was designed by the Boller Brothers architectural firm with elements of Mission Revival style. Its facade was altered in the 1940s to add "a modicum of modernistic details" and to add "neon on a wall-mounted sign above the marquee".

It is categorized in the NRHP nomination as having Moderne style.
