= Nuhne =

River in Germany

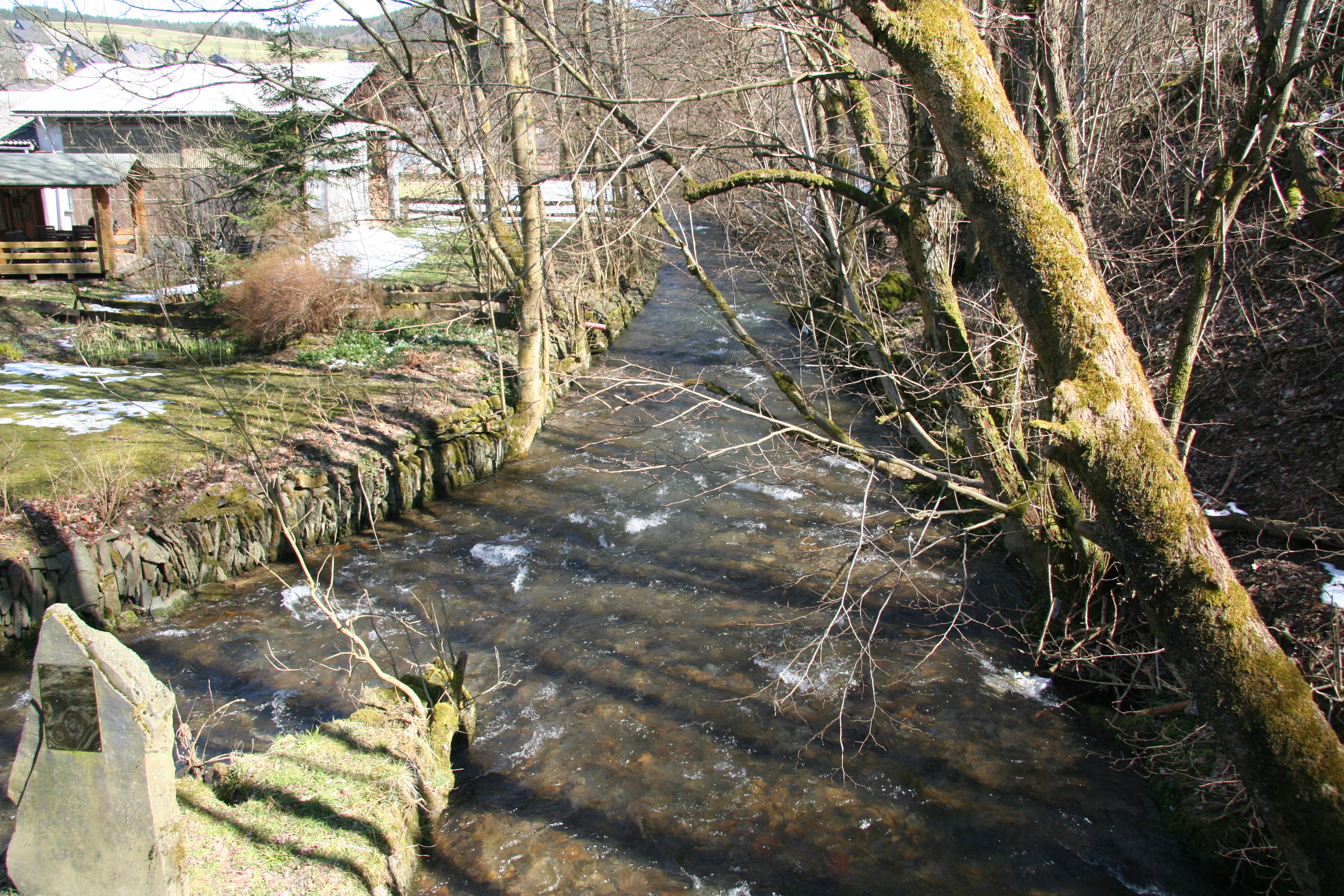

- Location within Germany

Location
- Country: Germany
- States: North Rhine-Westphalia; Hesse

Physical characteristics
- Mouth
  - location: Eder
  - coordinates: 51.0770°N 8.8143°E
- Length: 36.3 km (22.6 mi)
- Basin size: 157 km^{2} (61 sq mi)

Basin features
- Progression: Eder→ Fulda→ Weser→ North Sea

Nuhne is a river of North Rhine-Westphalia and of Hesse, Germany. It is a left tributary of the Eder, which it joins near Frankenberg.

== See also ==
- List of rivers of North Rhine-Westphalia
- List of rivers of Hesse
