= Confederate Monument (Oxford, Mississippi) =

1906 statue at University of Mississippi, U.S.

- United States
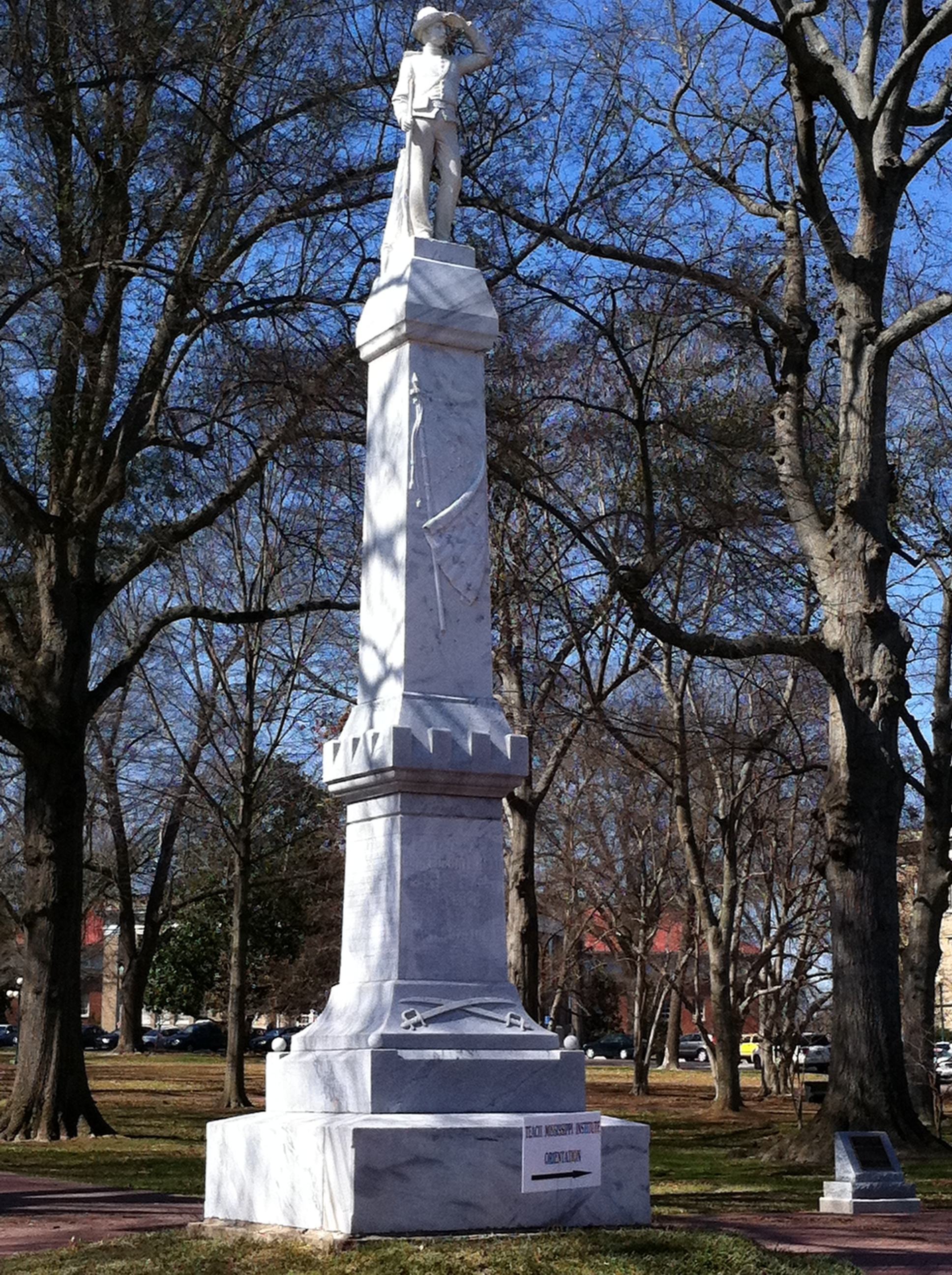
- The monument in 2008
- Used for those deceased
- Established: 1906
- Location: 34°21′39″N 89°32′20″W; University of Mississippi, Oxford, Mississippi, U.S.
- Designed by: John Stinson

The Confederate Monument was installed on the University of Mississippi campus in Oxford, Mississippi in 1906 memorializing Company A of the 11th Mississippi Infantry Regiment, the University Greys, occasionally referred to as University Grays. At the outset of the American Civil War, most of the student body enlisted and fought in several battles, and the Greys were all but wiped out at the Battle of Gettysburg.

The monument was designed by John Stinson and installed in 1906 at the campus administrative entrance. Due to its controversial nature a reinterpretation plaque was added beneath the monument in 2016, but revised a few months later in response to protests. Subsequent protests concerning the monument's prominent location led to it being relocated in 2020 to a secluded Civil War cemetery on the university's campus.

== Background ==
At the beginning of the American Civil War, most of the student body of the University of Mississippi rallied to the Confederate cause, many of them forming Company A of the 11th Mississippi Infantry Regiment, known as the University Greys. Company A fought at the First Battle of Manassas in the brigade of Brigadier General Barnard Elliott Bee, a unit of the Army of the Shenandoah (Confederate) under the command of then-Brigadier General Joseph E. Johnston. They also fought at the Battle of Gaines's Mill, the Battle of Malvern Hill, the Second Battle of Manassas, the Battle of South Mountain and the Battle of Antietam.

As a unit of the division under the command of Brigadier General J. Johnston Pettigrew in Pickett's Charge at the Battle of Gettysburg, the University Greys suffered 100 percent casualties on July 3, 1863. Every soldier in the company who started the assault was either killed, wounded or captured.

== Design ==
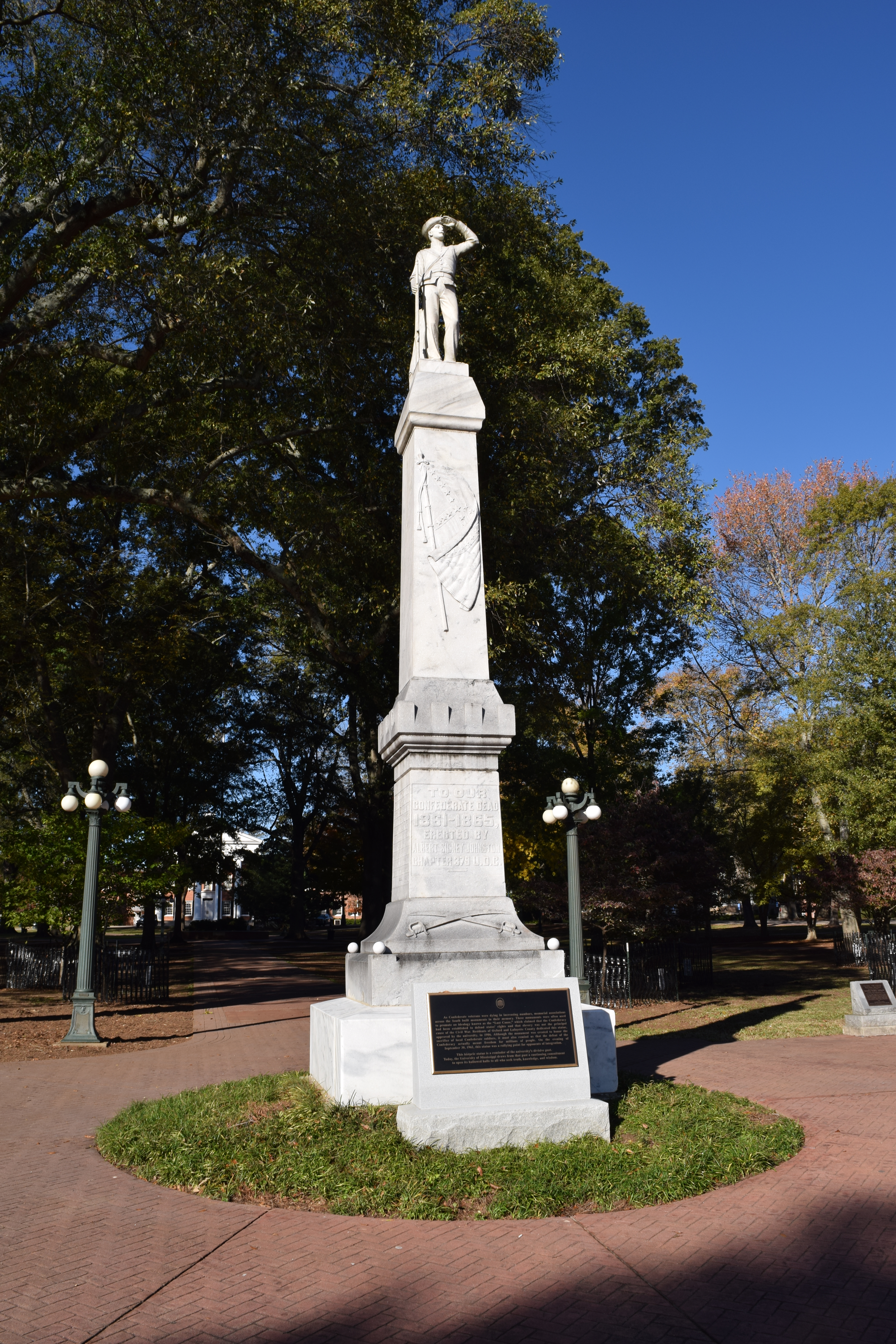
The monument in 2018, with the contextual plaque

The Confederate Monument was designed by John Stinson and installed in 1906 by the Daughters of the Confederacy at the campus administrative entrance. The 30-foot-tall (9 m) sculpture was built in marble on a brick foundation. It depicts a Confederate soldier with a rifle in his right hand and saluting with his left.

The inscription on the east face of the sculpture read:

TO OUR
CONFEDERATE DEAD
1861–1865,
ERECTED BY
ALBERT SIDNEY JOHNSTON
CHAPTER 379 U.D.C.

The inscription on the south face read:

THEY FELL DEVOTED BUT UNDYING;
THE VERY GALE THEIR NAMES SEEM'D SIGHING;
THE WATERS MURMUR'D OF THEIR NAME;
THE WOODS WERE PEOPLED WITH THEIR FAME;
THE SILENT PILLAR, LONE AND GRAY.
CLAIM'D KINDRED WITH THEIR SACRED CLAY;
THEIR SPIRITS WRAPP'D THE DUSKY MOUNTAIN;
THEIR MEMORY SPARKLED O'ER THE FOUNTAIN,
THE MEANEST RILL, THE MIGHTIEST RIVER,
ROLL'D MINGLING WITH THEIR FAME FOREVER
BYRON

The inscription on the west face of the sculpture read:

TO THE HEROES
OF LAFAYETTE COUNTY
WHOSE VALOR AND DEVOTION
MADE GLORIOUS MANY A BATTLEFIELD

== Reception ==
The statue was a focal point for unrest in 1962 when James Meredith attempted to enroll in the university, which hitherto had been segregated and open to white people only. The ensuing Ole Miss riot of 1962 saw two murders committed, and the police having to use tear gas. Since then, the university has been racially integrated, and by 2016 some 13.1 percent of the student body was Black. (Black people account for 38.69 percent of the population of Mississippi.)

In 1997, the university banned sticks in the football stadium, so spectators could not wave Confederate battle flags, the Colonel Reb mascot was retired in 2003, and the university marching band no longer plays "Dixie". In 2012, when the university celebrated the 50th anniversary of desegregation, Black and white students clashed on election night when Barack Obama secured a second term. In 2014, two students tied a noose and a Confederate flag to the campus statue of James Meredith. They were later convicted of Federal hate crimes. In 2015, the university stopped flying the Confederate-themed flag of Mississippi.

That year, in response to pressure from students about the Confederate Monument, the university decided to add a plaque providing context to the monument. A committee was appointed in 2015, which drew up a wording. A plaque was made and installed in March 2016. The plaque read:

As Confederate veterans were passing from the scene in increasing numbers, memorial associations built monuments in their memory all across the south. This monument was dedicated by citizens of Oxford and Lafayette County in 1906. On the evening of September 30, 1962, the statue was a rallying point where a rebellious mob gathered to prevent the admission of the University's first African American Student. it was also at this statue where a local minister implored the mob to disperse and allow James Meredith to exercise his rights as an American Citizen. On the Morning After that long night Meredith was admitted to the University and graduated in August 1963.

This historic structure is a reminder of the University's past and of its current and ongoing commitment to open its hallowed halls to all who seek truth and knowledge and wisdom.

Criticism of the wording of the plaque resulted in the chancellor, Jeffrey Scott Vitter, appointing an Advisory Committee on History and Context, consisting of four academics, Donald Cole, Andrew Mullins, Charles Ross and David Sansing, to consider a revised wording. The committee's terms of reference did not permit it to consider relocating the statue. The replacement plaque was approved by the chancellor, and installed in June 2016. It read:

As Confederate veterans were dying in increasing numbers, memorial associations across the South built monuments in their memory. These monuments were often used to promote an ideology known as the "Lost Cause", which claimed that the Confederacy had been established to defend states' rights and that slavery was not the principal cause of the Civil War. Residents of Oxford and Lafayette County dedicated this statue, approved by the university, in 1906. Although the monument was created to honor the sacrifice of local Confederate soldiers, it must also remind us that the defeat of the Confederacy actually meant freedom for millions of people. On the evening of September 30, 1962, this statue was a rallying point for opponents of integration.

This historic statue is a reminder of the university's divisive past. Today, the University of Mississippi draws from that past a continuing commitment to open its hallowed halls to all who seek truth, knowledge, and wisdom.

In September 2017, the plaque and memorial was rammed and damaged by an apparent "drunk driver", resulting in a $10,000 repair bill.

In 2018, a student campaign began to have the statue relocated to a less conspicuous location, a Confederate cemetery on a remote part of campus. A 2004 Mississippi law forbids the removal or rededication of monuments to the "War Between the States" that were erected on public property, but it permits relocation to a more suitable location if the governing body of the site determined that the new location was a more appropriate site and still on public property. In this case, the Mississippi Institutions of Higher Learning claimed jurisdiction.

In March 2019, the Associated Student Body Senate unanimously passed a motion calling for the statue's relocation. The university board voted to move the statue in June 2020, and it was moved to the new location in July. The relocation was estimated to cost $1.2 million, which was raised from private subscriptions.

== See also ==
- List of Confederate monuments and memorials in Mississippi
