= Statue of James Meredith =

Statue in Oxford, Mississippi

- Interactive map of Statue of James Meredith
- Location: University of Mississippi, Oxford, Mississippi, United States
- Coordinates: 34°21′55″N 89°32′12″W
- Material: Bronze
- Dedicated date: October 1, 2006
- Dedicated to: James Meredith

A statue of James Meredith stands on the campus of the University of Mississippi in Oxford, Mississippi, United States. The statue honors Meredith, a civil rights activist who integrated the university in 1962. It was dedicated in 2006 and is located near a portal. The statue and portal collectively make up the Civil Rights Monument.

== History ==
=== Background ===
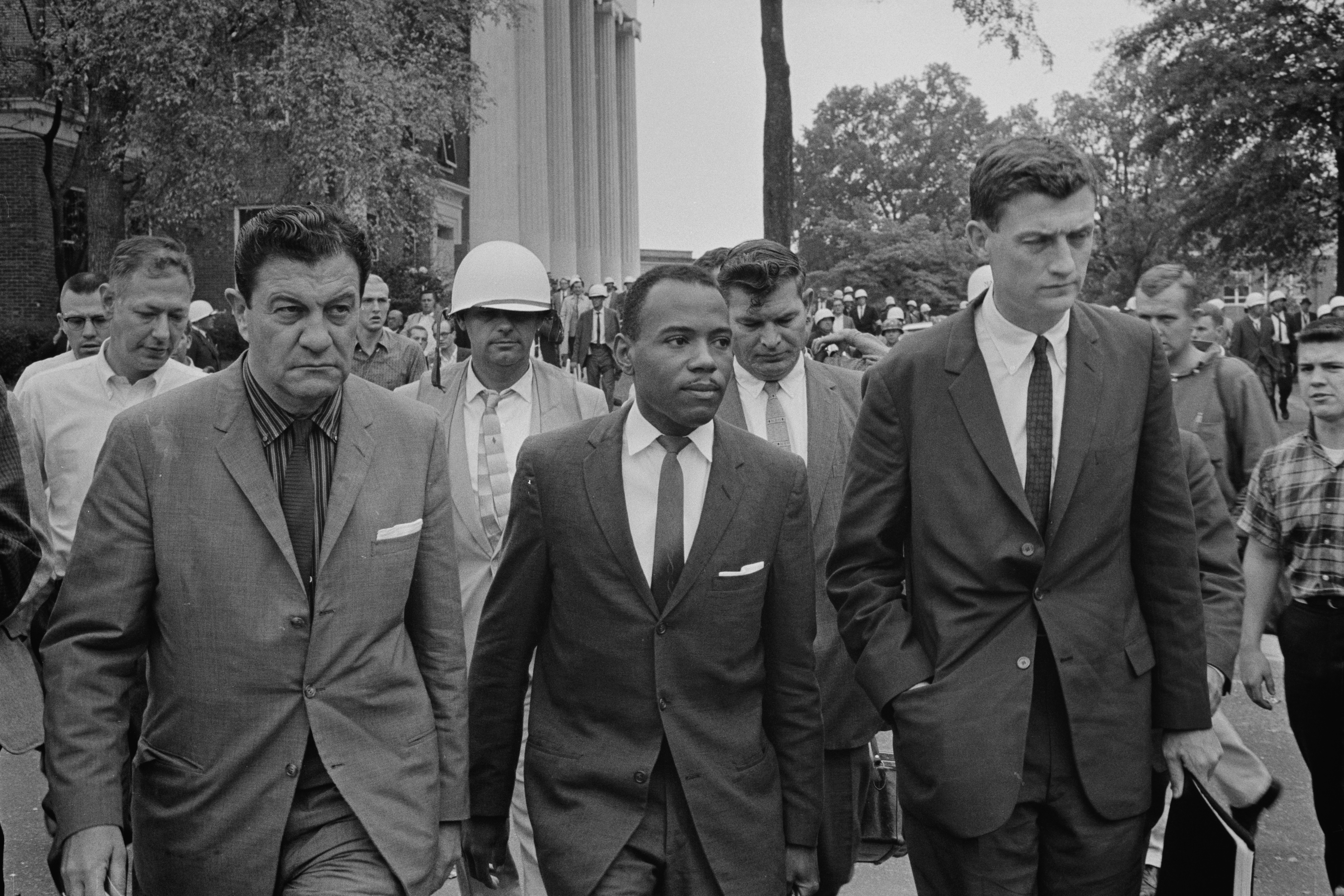
James Meredith walking to class on the UM campus, accompanied by two U.S. marshals

James Meredith was a civil rights activist who enrolled at the University of Mississippi in 1962, becoming the first African American student at the university. However, his enrollment was opposed by proponents of racial segregation, with this opposition escalating into the Ole Miss riot of 1962, which led to two deaths and numerous injuries. While state officials tried to prevent Meredith from attending the university, United States President John F. Kennedy ordered federal authorities to escort him onto the university's campus. Meredith was officially enrolled and the university integrated on October 1, 1962.

=== Dedication ===
This statue honoring Meredith was dedicated on the 44th anniversary of the integration of the university, on October 1, 2006. Approximately 1,500 people attended the ceremony, which featured a keynote speech from U.S. Representative John Lewis, who said, "With the unveiling of this monument, we free ourselves from the chains of a difficult past. Today we can celebrate a new day, a new beginning, the birth of a new South and a new America that is more free, more fair and more just than ever before." Other speakers at the event included U.S. Representative Roger Wicker, Chancellor Robert Khayat, actor Morgan Freeman, and James's son Joseph Meredith. James, while attending the event, was not a speaker. The cost of the total monument, which also includes a nearby portal, cost $160,000, which was raised through grants and donations.

A 2018 article in The Daily Mississippian stated that Meredith was opposed to the statue from the time of its erection, arguing that both that statue and the Confederate Monument on the campus should be removed. However, after attending the 2018 Black Alumni Reunion, his position on the statue has changed.

=== Vandalism ===
In the early morning of February 16, 2014, the statue was vandalized, with a noose placed around the statue's neck and an old state flag of Georgia (which features a Confederate battle flag) draped across the figure. The incident was first reported by a construction worker who reported hearing two men shouting racial slurs. The following day, the alumni association offered a $25,000 reward to anyone who could provide information on the identity of the two men, while the campus police asked the Federal Bureau of Investigation for help with the investigation. By the following week, police had pressed charges against two 19-year-old students from Georgia, with a third student considered "prominent in the investigation". Following the charges, the fraternity that the three students belonged to, Sigma Phi Epsilon, was suspended by the university and an investigation into reports of other issues at the fraternity, including underage drinking and hazing, was launched by the university. In April, the University of Mississippi chapter of that fraternity was shut down.

Two students were charged with one count of using a threat of force to intimidate African-American students and employees by putting a noose on the James Meredith statue. Graeme Phillip Harris pled guilty and was sentenced to 6 months in prison followed by a year of probation, and 100 hours of community service. Austin Reed Edenfield pled guilty and was sentenced to 12 months probation and ordered to complete 50 hours of uncompensated community service. The third student was not charged with a crime.

== Design ==
The life-size bronze statue depicts Meredith walking towards a 17-foot (5.2 m) tall limestone portal, which has the words "courage", "knowledge", "opportunity", and "perseverance" inscribed around the top. Meredith is wearing a suit and has a light mustache. A plaque located in front of the statue bears the following inscription:

James H. Meredith, / a Mississippi native of Kosciusko, / stepped into the pages of / history on October 1, 1962 / when he opened the doors to / higher education at the / University of Mississippi and in / the South. As a major figure in / the American civil rights / movement, he helped lead the / way to justice and equality / for all citizens.

The statue is approximately 100 yards (91 m) from the Confederate Monument on the university's campus, between the Lyceum Building and the J. D. Williams Library.

== See also ==
- 2006 in art
- Civil rights movement in popular culture
