= Murder of Paul Guihard =

French journalist (1932–1962)

Paul Guihard
- Born: Paul Leslie Guihard; 1931; London, England
- Died: 30 September 1962 (aged 29–30); Oxford, Mississippi, US
- Cause of death: Gunshot wound to the heart
- Citizenship: France; United Kingdom

Paul Leslie Guihard (1931 – 30 September 1962) was a French-British journalist for Agence France-Presse. He was murdered in the 1962 riot at the University of Mississippi while covering the events surrounding James Meredith's attempts to enroll at the all-white university. The only journalist known to have been killed in the Civil Rights Movement, his murder remains unsolved.

== Early life ==
Guihard was born in London in 1931, the son of an English mother and a French father, both of whom worked in the hotel industry. He had a brother, Alain Guihard. He was a dual citizen of France and the United Kingdom. In 1935, his parents purchased London's Rhodesia Court Hotel, and sent the three-year-old Guihard to stay with his grandparents in Saint-Malo, France while they attended to the new business. He remained in Saint-Malo until the end of World War II, and at fourteen returned to his parents in London. There he attended the French Lycée and the University of London, where he earned a degree in international affairs.

Guihard was always interested in writing and found part-time work with Agence France-Presse (AFP) while in his teens, covering the 1948 London Olympics for the agency. His dedication to his work earned him the nickname "Flash". At 19 he joined the British Army, serving at the Suez Canal. He joined Agence France-Presse full-time in 1953 after his discharge. AFP transferred him to its English-speaking desk in Paris in 1959 and assigned him to the New York office the following year. In New York Guihard chiefly worked as an editor, also occasionally contributing stories for AFP and freelancing for London's Daily Sketch. He also wrote plays, including "The Deck Chair", which was performed in New York and later adapted into French for several performances in France.

== University of Mississippi assignment and death ==
On 30 September 1962, AFP assigned Guihard, aged 30, to cover the developing story of James Meredith's enrollment at the University of Mississippi, the first time an African-American enrolled at the school. As an editor, Guihard infrequently went out on assignment, and did not regularly cover the Civil Rights beat; in fact, Guihard had the day off. However, the agency was short-staffed and felt the story needed to be covered, so it called in Guihard and photographer Sammy Schulman to go to Mississippi.

That morning, Guihard and Schulman flew from New York to Jackson, Mississippi via Atlanta. They found a tense atmosphere in which the federal government was prepared to use force to ensure Meredith's enrollment despite the attempts of governor Ross Barnett and local segregationists to keep him out. Guihard and Schulman visited the governor's office, where the Citizens' Council had organized a segregationist rally. They then visited the local Citizens' Council headquarters to interview executive director Louis Hollis. The meeting was friendly and Guihard received Hollis' permission to file a story from the office; this 198-word piece, Guihard's last, called the situation "the gravest Constitutional crisis that the United States has known since the War of Secession" and asserted that the "Civil War never came to an end".

Guihard and Schulman then drove north to the University of Mississippi in Oxford. While en route, they heard President John F. Kennedy's speech indicating that federal agents had already escorted Meredith to campus. Assuming the story was over, they continued on to Oxford to clear up the details. When they arrived, at around 8:40 p.m., however, they learned that rioting had started on campus. Parking near The Grove, Guihard and Shulman split up to avoid being identified as journalists and targeted by the mob, agreeing to meet back up an hour later. Guihard headed toward the riot gathering at the Lyceum and Circle areas of campus, while Shulman circled the Grove. Life photographer Flip Schulke saw Guihard heading toward the riot and tried to stop him, but Guihard refused, saying, "I'm not worried; I was in Cyprus." This may have been the last time anyone spoke to Guihard.

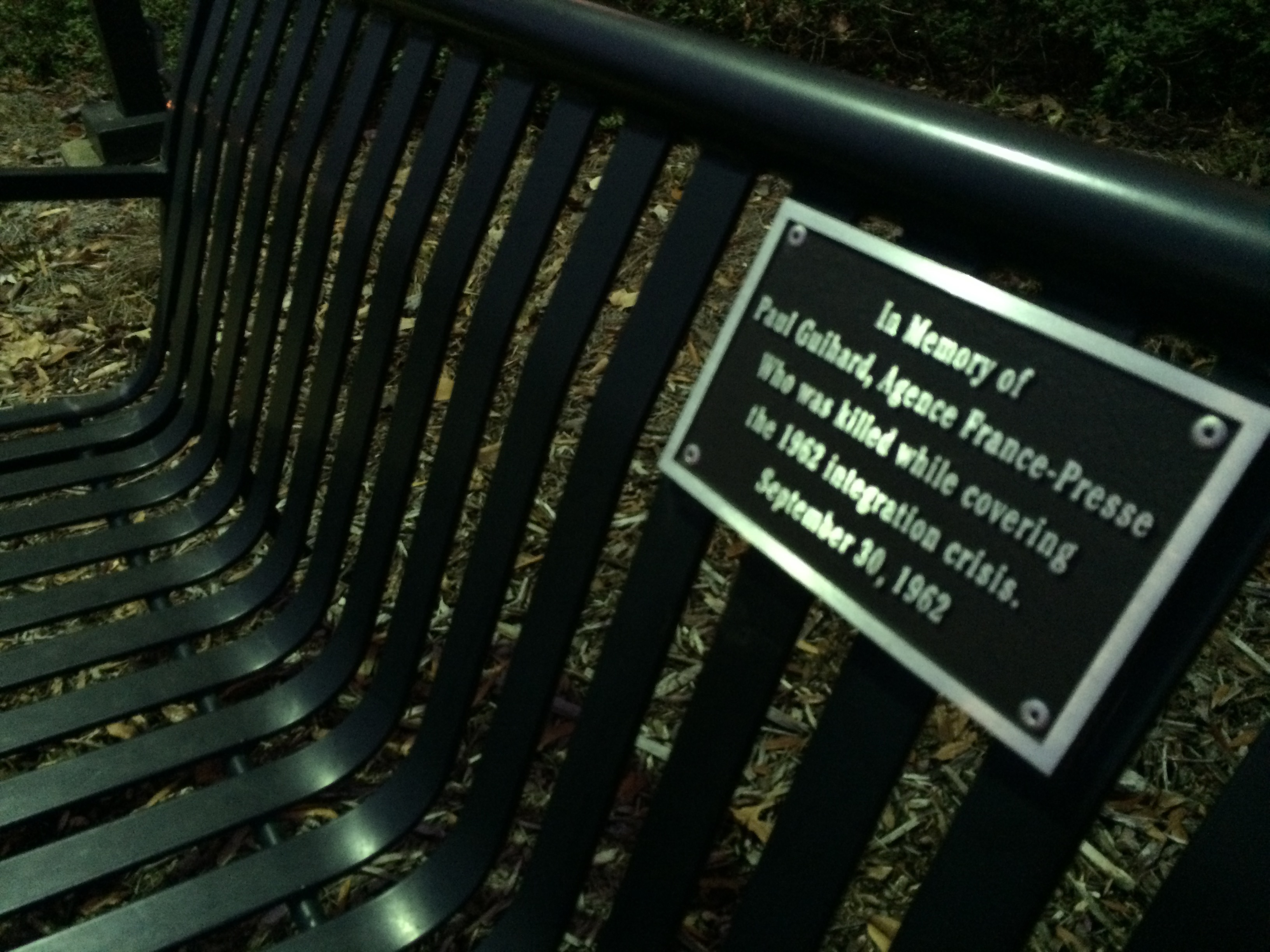
A bench on the University of Mississippi campus dedicated to Guihard

Guihard was shot in an unlit area at the southeast corner of the Ward Dormitory between 8 and 9 p.m. His body was found by students just east of the dormitory at 9 p.m. The students attempted to revive him and sought help, but were not immediately certain what had happened to him; they initially believed he had suffered cardiac arrest from the tear gas. The riot exacerbated matters, as ambulances could not get through the crowd to assist. Eventually, the students were able to get a car to the area and took Guihard to Oxford Hospital, where he was pronounced dead on arrival. The hospital determined that he had been killed by "a gunshot wound to the back that penetrated the heart". The hospital sent Guihard's body to a nearby funeral home, where Schulman made the identification. He was the only journalist murdered during the Civil Rights Era.

The Federal Bureau of Investigation handled the initial investigation with assistance from local authorities. Sheriff Joe Ford surmised that the shooter had attacked Guihard either knowing he was a journalist, or mistaking him as a protester, and had certainly intended to kill him. Guihard may have stood out from the crowd due to his large frame, red hair, distinctive red goatee, and potentially his foreign accent. The investigation never identified a suspect and the case remains unsolved.

== Memorials ==
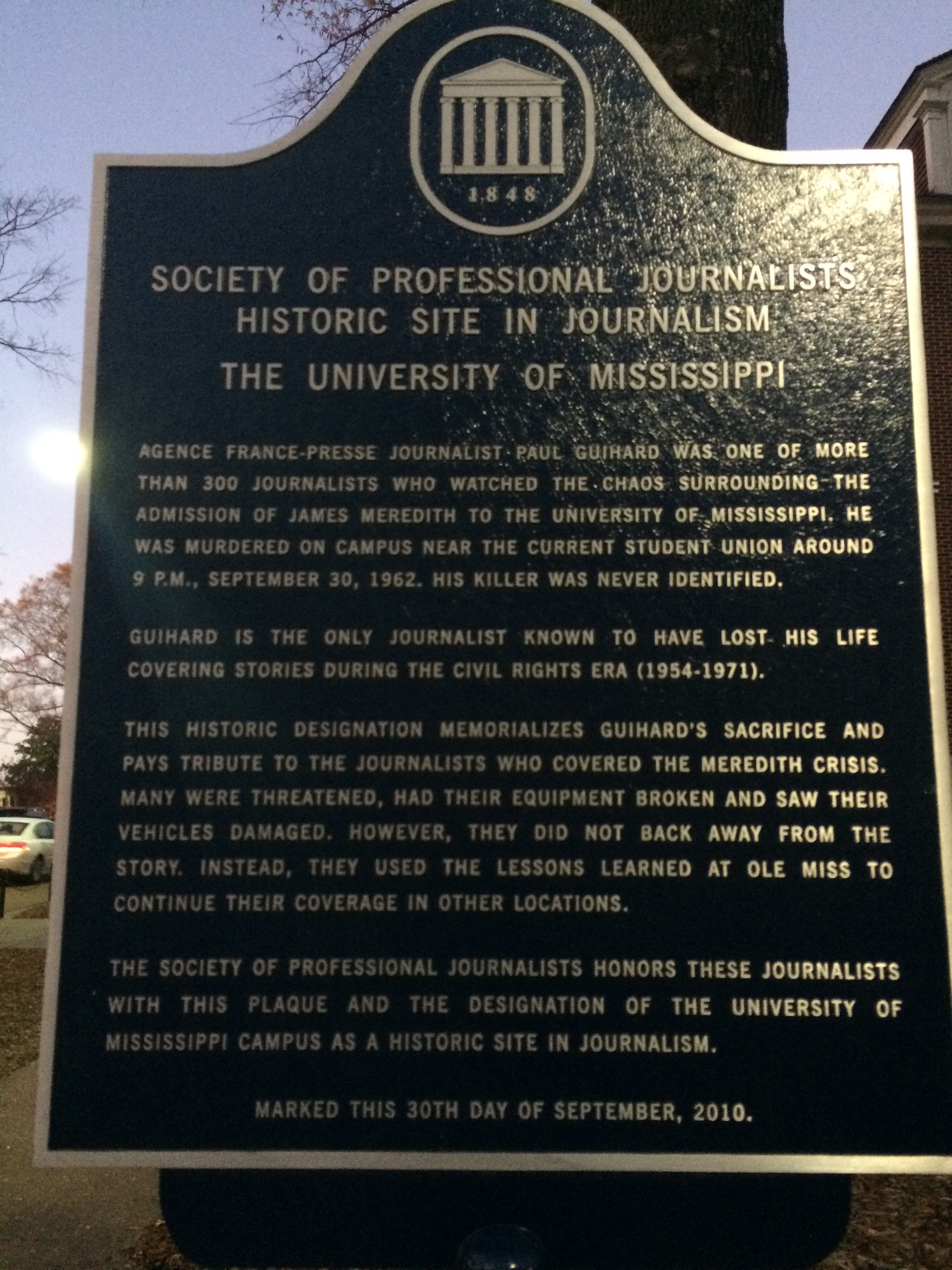
A plaque on the University of Mississippi campus memorializing Guihard's death

in 1989, Paul Guihard's name was included in the Civil Rights Memorial in Montgomery, Alabama, memorializing 40 people who lost their lives in the struggle for civil rights. Twenty years later a memorial plaque was unveiled by representatives of the University of Mississippi and from AFP, a short distance from where his body was found. Some 150 students and teachers from the School of Journalism participated in the ceremony.

== See also ==
- List of journalists killed in the United States
- List of unsolved murders (1900–1979)
