= Lyceum (Mississippi) =

- The Lyceum
- U.S. National Historic Landmark District – Contributing property
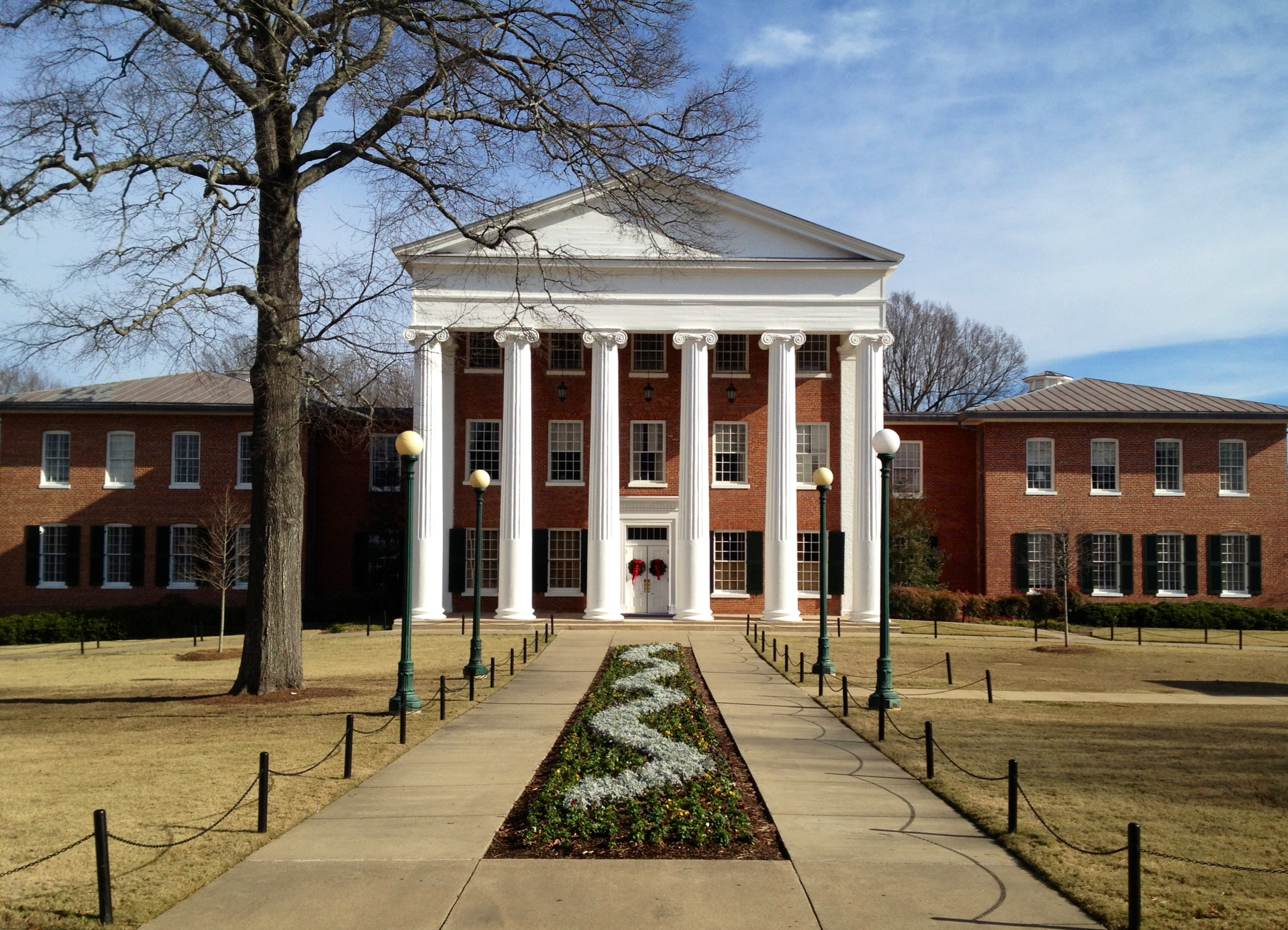
- The Lyceum

- Location within Mississippi Location within the United States
- Location: Oxford, Mississippi, United States
- Coordinates: 34.2156°N 89.3210°W
- Built: 1848
- Architect: William Nichols
- Part of: Lyceum–The Circle Historic District (ID08001092)
- Designated NHLDCP: October 7, 2008

The Lyceum is an academic building at the University of Mississippi in Oxford, Mississippi. Designed by English architect William Nichols, it was named after Aristotle's Lyceum. It purportedly contains the oldest academic bell in the United States.

The building served as a hospital for Confederate wounded during the Civil War. Federal forces used the building as their operations headquarters during Ole Miss riot of 1962. It is a contributing property of the Lyceum–The Circle Historic District, a National Historic Landmark district on the National Register of Historic Places.

== Construction and architecture ==
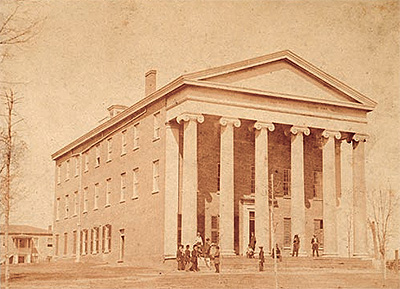
The Lyceum, pictured in 1861 before the 1903 addition of two wings

In January 1846, the board of trustees selected architect William Nichols to oversee construction of the university and approved his proposed design for the university's central building, which he based the design on an Ionic Temple on the Illysis near Athens. Daniel Grayson of nearby Panola County was chosen by the Board to manage construction of the building as contractor. He had served in a similar role overseeing construction of Lafayette County's first brick courthouse, completed in Oxford in 1840. Ohio-born brothers John Williamson Crary and Oliver Beal Crary superintended the brickwork on the building. Much of the skilled and unskilled labor (clearing the lot, masonry, carpentry, bricklaying, etc.) for the building's construction was provided by enslaved African American workers, whose owners received payments for their work.

Construction on the building was begun in the late spring of 1846. On July 14, 1846, a Masonic ceremony laid the cornerstone of the Lyceum. Within, a leaden box contained a copy of the law that created the university, a Bible, gold and silver coins, and a copy of the Declaration of Independence. (Note: The cornerstone has never been found. It has been suggested that a contractor may have later removed it.)

Originally referred to as the "principal building" of the university, the name Lyceum, which refers to the classical school established by Aristotle, seems to have first been used for the building in the 1870s.

The university's opening ceremony was held in a lecture hall in the Lyceum on November 6, 1848. The Lyceum served as the meeting place for several student societies until the construction of the chapel in 1853. It also served as the meeting place for the board of trustees. The third floor of the Lyceum housed the school's library until 1881 when it was moved to Lafayette Hall.

In 1859, Chancellor Frederick Augustus Porter Barnard built a 36-foot (11 m) addition to the Lyceum, extending from the rear (west side) of the building. The additional space included a lecture hall and a larger chemistry laboratory. In 1903, two wings were added to the building. The addition of the wings was controversial, with the school magazine writing that it compromised the Lyceum's classical design. One year later, telephones were installed in the Lyceum.

By 1916, the University of Mississippi had an undershortage of dormitories, resulting in students being housed in the basement of the Lyceum. A 1918 government inspection found the Lyceum to be in state of disrepair and deterioration. In 1923, significant structural changes, including the addition of columns to the western entrance, were made to the Lyceum.

The campus' center is "The Circle", which consists of eight academic buildings organized around an ovaloid common. The Lyceum was the first building built on the Oxford campus and was expanded with two wings in 1903. The university claims that the Lyceum's bell is the oldest academic bell in the United States.

Architectural features of the Lyceum

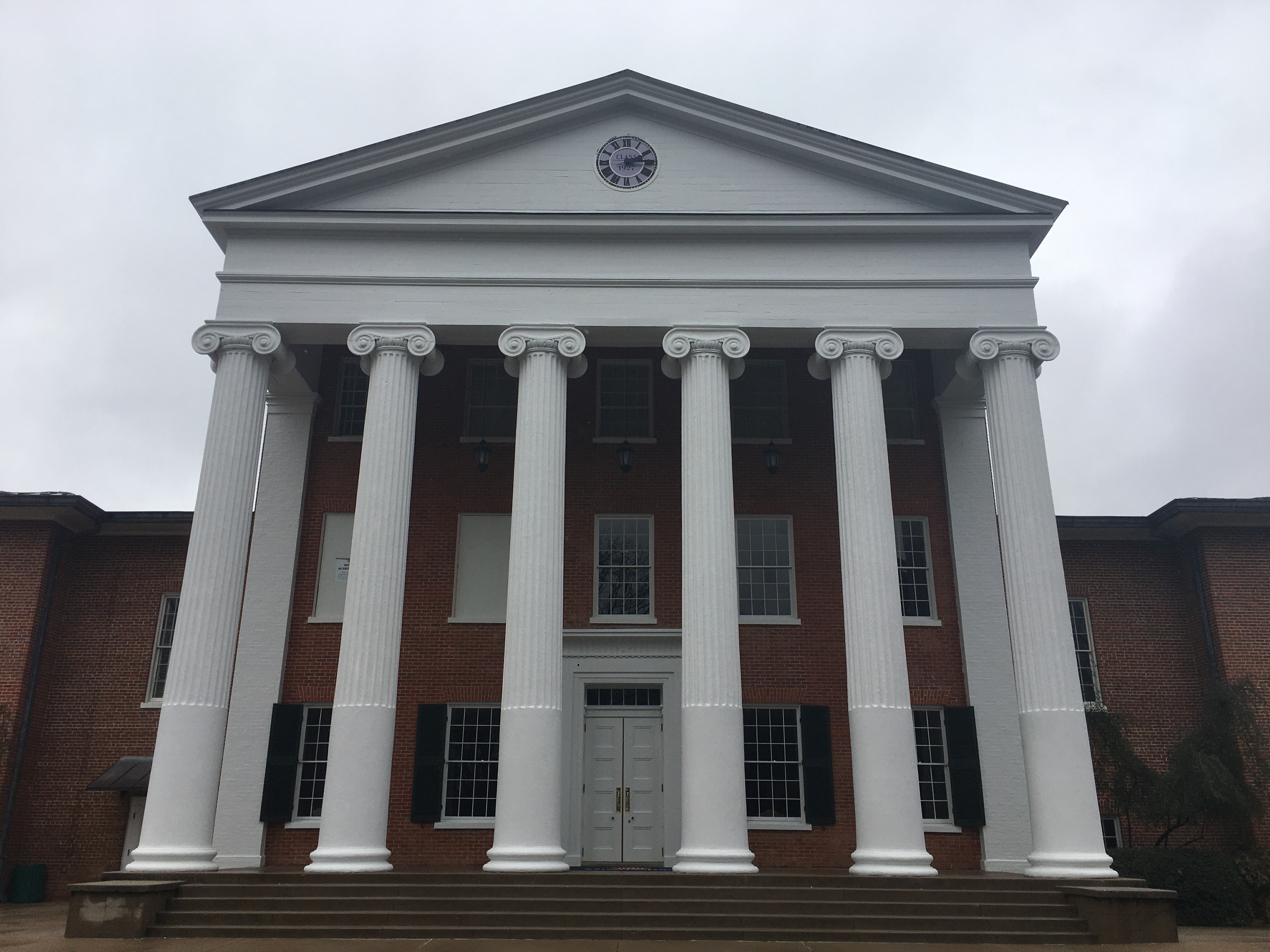
Columns

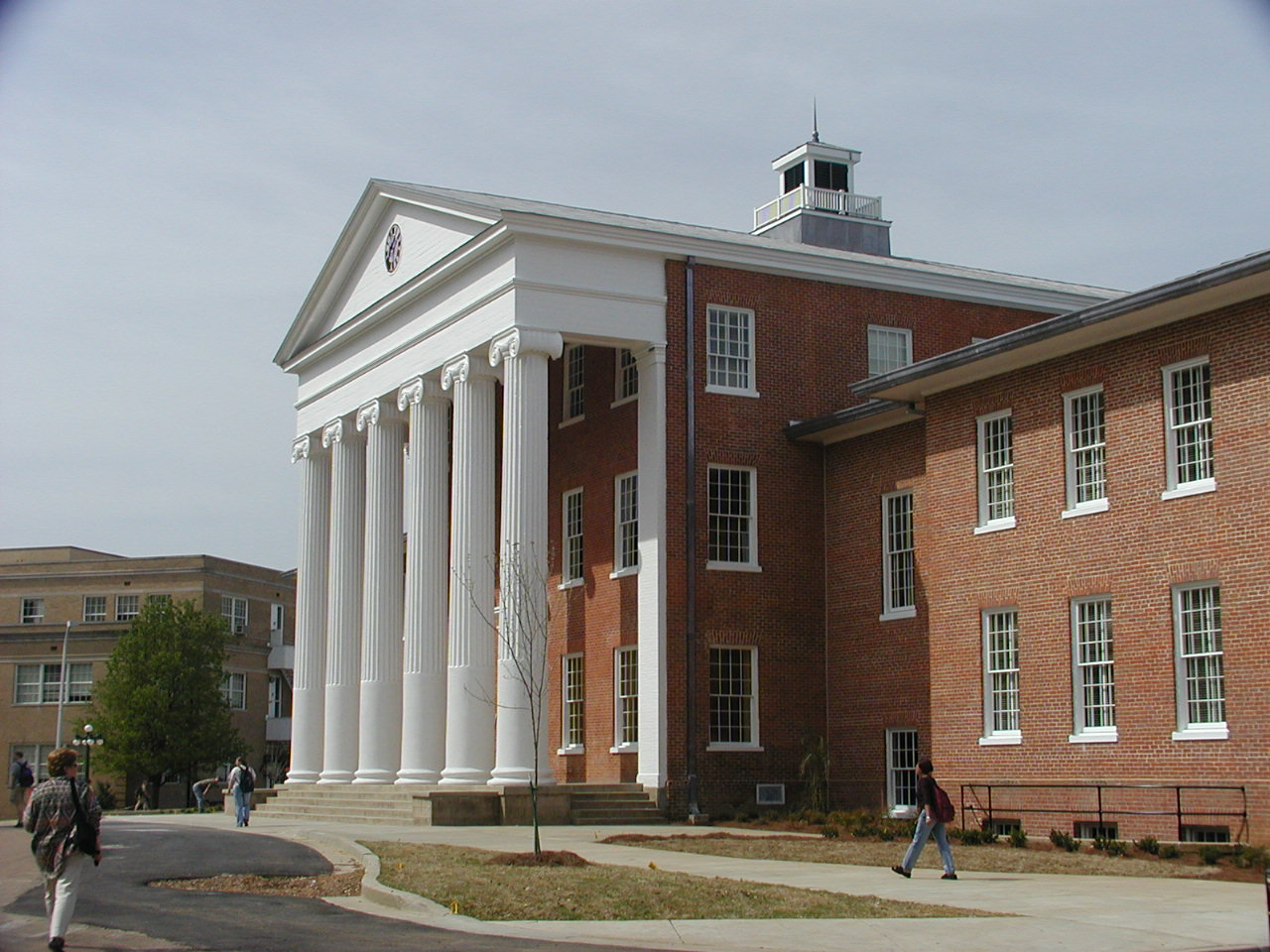
Protrusion

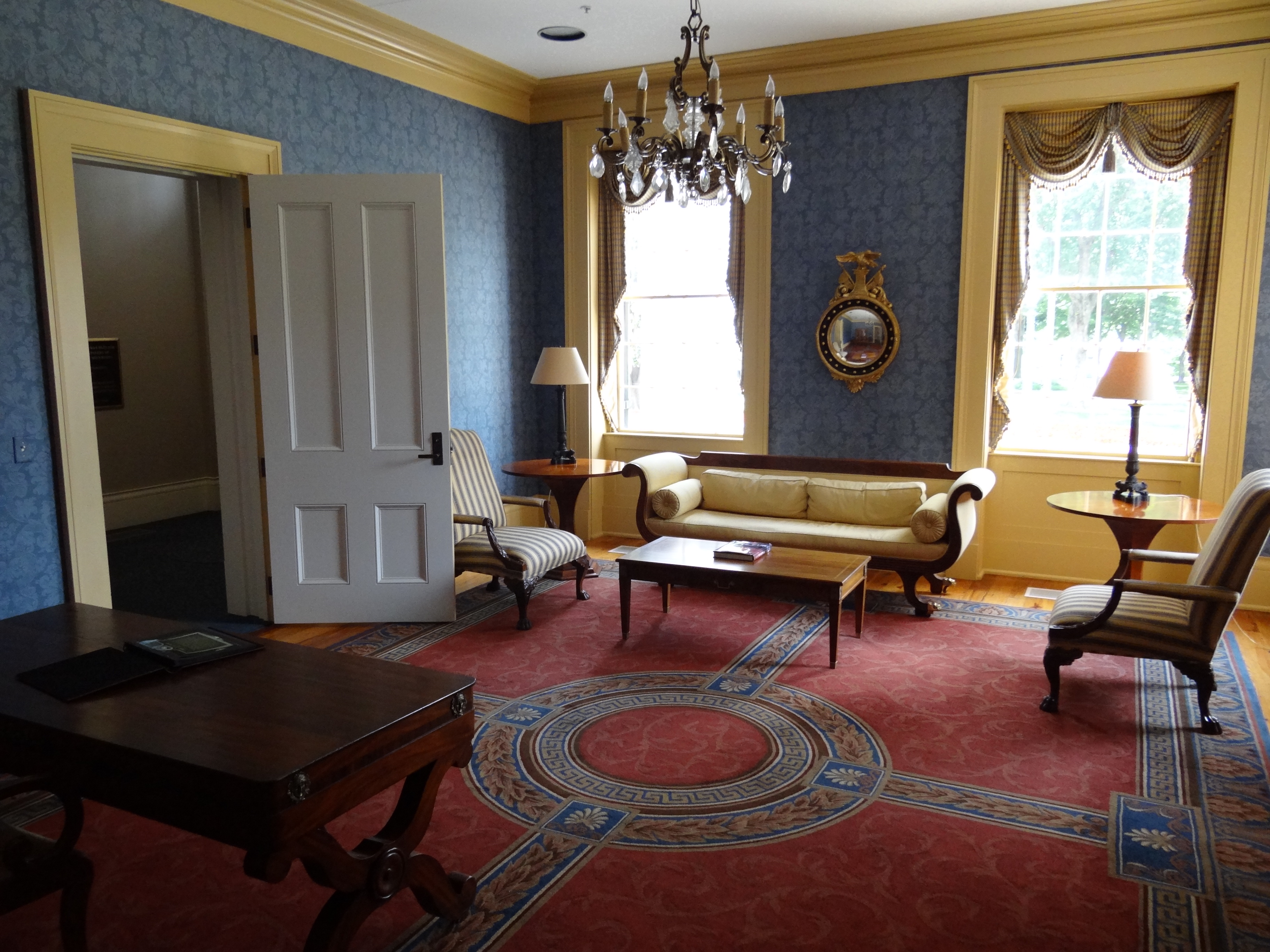
Interior room

== History ==
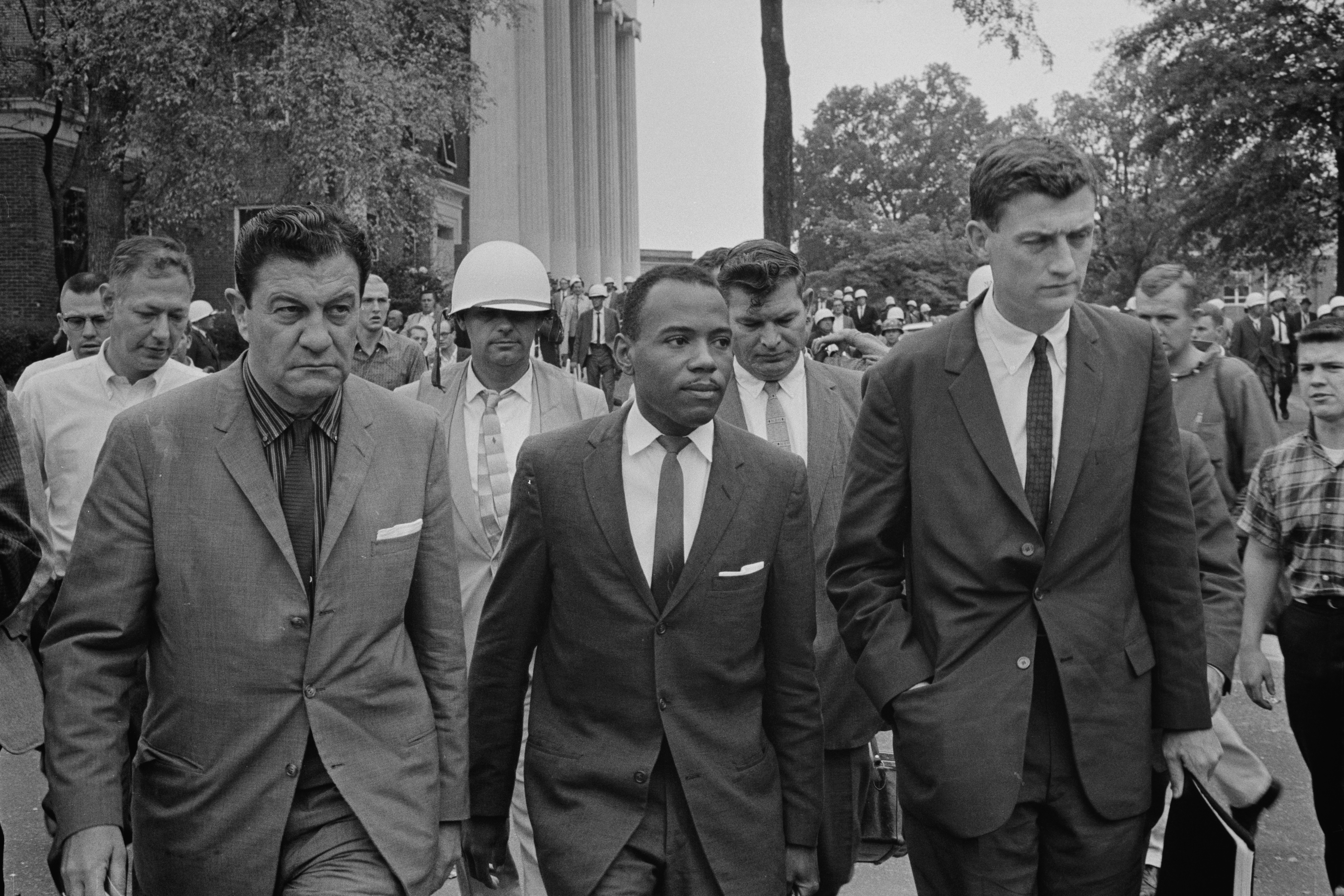
The columns of the Lyceum can be seen behind James Meredith as he is accompanied by federal officials

=== Antebellum and Civil War ===
converted into a hospital for Confederate wounded. It was evacuated in November 1862 as general Ulysses S. Grant's Union forces approached. Although Kansas troops destroyed much of the medical equipment, a lone remaining professor persuaded Grant against burning the campus. After three weeks, Grant and his forces left, and the campus returned to being a Confederate hospital. Throughout the war, over 700 wounded died and were buried on campus.

=== Integration ===
They converted the university's administration building, the Lyceum, into their operations headquarters. Local police established barriers to prevent the entry of all except for students and faculty.

=== Modern history ===
In 2008, the Lyceum and the surrounding grounds involved in the riot were designated as a National Historic Landmark as the Lyceum–The Circle Historic District.

The Lyceum was occupied by student protestors in 2016.

== Notes and references ==
=== Works cited ===
- Fowler, Richard (December 1941). "The University of Mississippi". BIOS. 12 (4): 213–215. JSTOR 4604602.
- Roberts, Gene; Klibanoff, Hank (2006). The Race Beat. Vintage Books. ISBN 978-0679735656.
- Sansing, David (1999). The University of Mississippi: A Sesquicentennial History. University Press of Mississippi. ISBN 978-1-57806-091-7.
