= Ole Miss riot of 1962 =

Civil unrest in Mississippi, United States

- Part of the civil rights movement
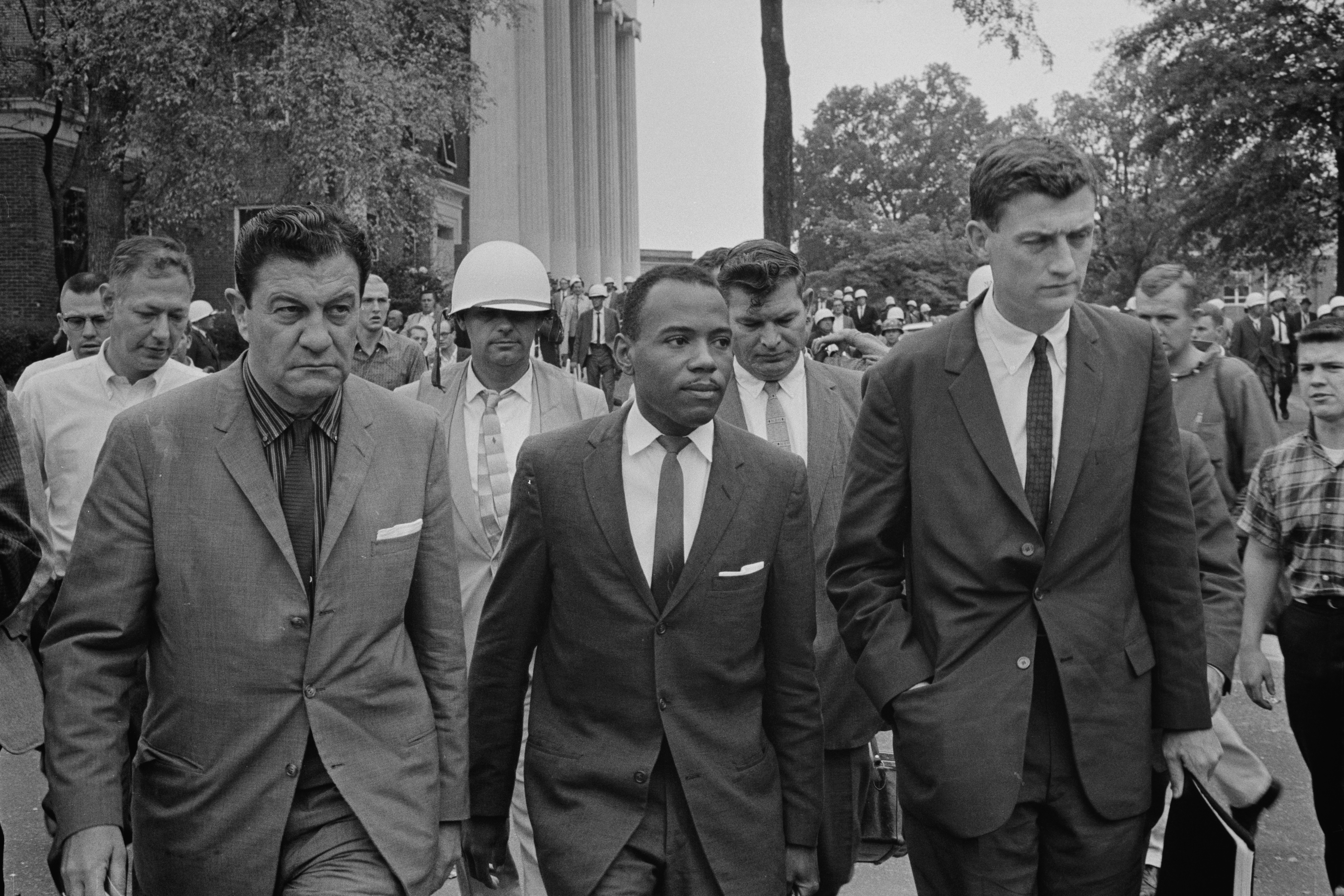
- Chief U.S. Marshal James McShane (left) and U.S. Assistant Attorney General for Civil Rights John Doar (right), escorting James Meredith (center) to class at Ole Miss after the riot.
- Date: September 30 – October 1, 1962 (2 days)
- Location: Lyceum-The Circle Historic District, University of Mississippi in Oxford, Mississippi
- Caused by: Brown v. Board of Education (1954); U.S. Fifth Circuit ruling in Meredith v. Fair (1962); Obstruction by University of Mississippi and Governor Ross Barnett
- Methods: Riots, protests, vandalism, arson, looting, murder
- Result: Deaths of Ray Gunter and Paul Guihard; Integration of the University of Mississippi

Parties
| U.S. federal government; Department of Justice; Civil Rights Division; U.S. Marshals Service; U.S. Army; Mississippi National Guard | Mississippi; State Senate; Protesters; Students |

Lead figures
| John F. Kennedy; Robert F. Kennedy; Nicholas Katzenbach; John Doar; James J. P. McShane; James Meredith | Ross Barnett; Edwin Walker |

Casualties
- Deaths: 2
- Injuries: Over 300

The Ole Miss riot of 1962 (September 30 – October 1, 1962), also known as the Battle of Oxford, was a race riot that occurred at the University of Mississippi—commonly called Ole Miss—in Oxford, Mississippi, as segregationist rioters sought to prevent the enrollment of African American applicant James Meredith. President John F. Kennedy eventually quelled the riot by mobilizing more than 30,000 troops, the most for a single disturbance in United States history.

In the wake of the Supreme Court's 1954 decision Brown v. Board of Education, Meredith tried to integrate Ole Miss by applying in 1961. When he informed the university that he was African American, his admission was delayed and obstructed, first by school officials and then by Mississippi Governor Ross Barnett. In a bid to block his enrollment, Barnett had Meredith temporarily jailed. Multiple attempts by Meredith, accompanied by federal officials, to enroll were physically blocked. Hoping to avoid violence and ensure Meredith's enrollment, President Kennedy and Attorney General Robert F. Kennedy had a series of unproductive telephone negotiations with Barnett.

In preparation for another registration attempt, federal law enforcement were dispatched to accompany Meredith to maintain order, but a riot erupted on campus. Partly incited by white supremacist and former General Edwin Walker, the mob assaulted reporters and federal officers, burned and looted property, and hijacked vehicles. Reporters, U.S. marshals, and the U.S. Deputy Attorney General Nicholas Katzenbach sheltered in the Lyceum, the university's administrative building into the late morning of October 1. One hundred and sixty marshals were injured, including 28 marshals who received gunshot wounds while defending the Lyceum from an attacking mob using smoke grenades, tear gas, and bayonets. Two civilians were killed during the riot, Paul Guihard, a French journalist, and Ray Gunter, a jukebox repairman. Unaware of the riot, President Kennedy made an Oval Office address, saluting Mississippi's help in registering Meredith. Once informed, Kennedy invoked the Insurrection Act of 1807 and deployed U.S. Army units under Brigadier General Charles Billingslea to quell the riot.

The riot and the federal crackdown were a major turning point in the civil rights movement and resulted in the desegregation of Ole Miss—the first integration of any public educational facility in Mississippi. The final time troops were deployed during the civil rights movement, it is regarded as the end of the segregationist tactic of massive resistance. A statue of James Meredith now commemorates the event on campus, and the site of the riot is designated as a National Historic Landmark. The confrontation also clarified the federal government’s role in enforcing court-ordered desegregation. After the enrollment of James Meredith, officials in the administration of John F. Kennedy signaled that resistance by state authorities, including those led by Ross Barnett, would not prevent compliance with federal law. In subsequent years, several Southern universities integrated with less direct confrontation, as the events at the University of Mississippi demonstrated that federal intervention would be used when necessary to uphold court rulings.

== Leadup ==
=== Meredith's attempts to enroll ===
The South is armed for revolt. These white people will accept another civil war knowing they are going to lose.

— Oxford native and Nobel laureate William Faulkner, 1956

In 1954, the U.S. Supreme Court ruled in Brown v. Board of Education that segregation in public schools was unconstitutional. Eight years after the Brown decision, every Mississippi school district remained segregated, and all attempts by African American applicants to integrate the University of Mississippi—better known as Ole Miss—had failed. In contrast, most other Southern states had already yielded and integrated their institutions of higher learning, with the University of Arkansas having done so in 1948. Shortly after the 1961 inauguration of President John F. Kennedy (who promised advances in civil rights), James Meredith applied to Ole Miss. Meredith, an African American who had served in the Air Force and completed coursework at Jackson State University, selected Ole Miss as it was a symbol of "white prestige and power" attended by the children of the state's elite. Meredith did not inform the university of his race until midway through the application process. State officials then obstructed and delayed his application for 20 months.

In response, Meredith sued the university in late 1961. (Note: The suit, which was assisted by the NAACP, was styled Meredith v. Fair.) After months of obstruction by the Fifth Circuit Court of Appeals' Benjamin Franklin Cameron, Meredith appealed to the U.S. Supreme Court. On September 10, 1962, Justice Hugo Black delivered the court's decision: Meredith must be admitted for the fall semester. Mississippi's segregationist Governor Ross Barnett, himself a graduate of Ole Miss, had the Mississippi Legislature pass a law barring the university enrollment of anyone with a charge of "moral turpitude" in state or federal court. Barnett then had Meredith charged and imprisoned for accidentally writing "1960" instead of "1961" while registering to vote; the Fifth Circuit quickly ordered Meredith's release.

Under the orders of the president's brother—U.S. Attorney General Robert F. Kennedy—the Department of Justice (DOJ) entered the case on Meredith's behalf. Facing contempt charges and jail, the university's board passed a resolution naming Governor Barnett as temporary regent of the college, making him responsible for Meredith's admission. (Note: Barnett did not want the position and hoped to pass the responsibilities to Gene Wirth, city editor of The Clarion-Ledger. However, Wirth died of a heart attack just a few hours after Barnett made the suggestion to the board.) Meredith then travelled to the Ole Miss campus in Oxford to register; he was blocked by Barnett, who read and presented a proclamation on states' rights. In a second attempt, Meredith, accompanied by DOJ civil-rights division chief John Doar and Chief U.S. Marshal James McShane, (Note: Robert Kennedy believed that Reconstruction had failed to solve race issues in the South because it sought to impose societal progress through force. Following this reasoning, he only sent two men to support Meredith.) tried to register at the Woolfolk State Office Building in Jackson. He was again physically blocked by Barnett, who issued the rehearsed quip: "Which one is Meredith?" Another attempt to register at Ole Miss was stopped by Lieutenant Governor Paul B. Johnson Jr. and lines of state troopers.

=== Kennedy dialogue and escalating tensions ===
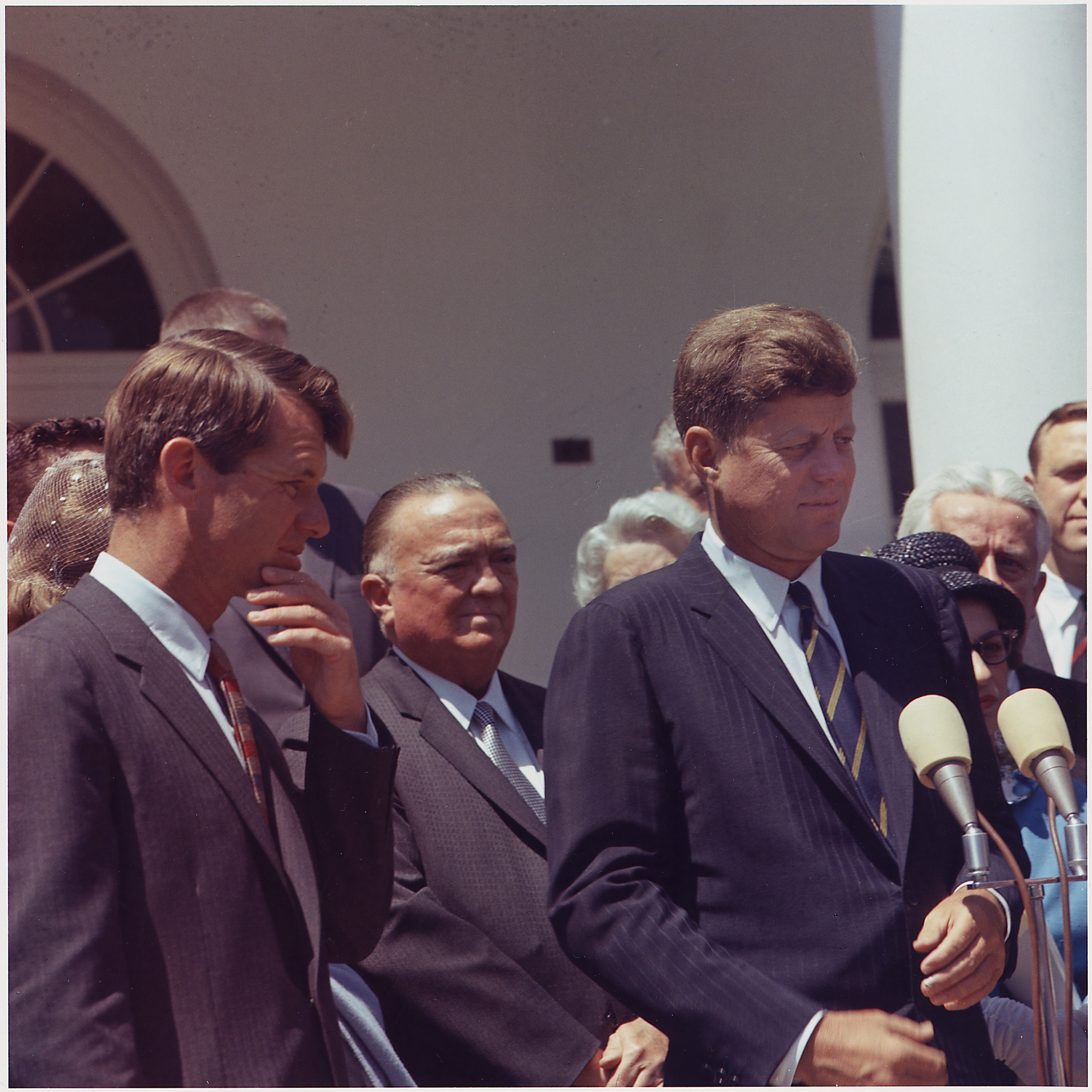
Attorney General Robert F. Kennedy (left) and President John F. Kennedy attempted to negotiate with Mississippi Governor Ross Barnett (recording below).

The Kennedy brothers hoped to resolve the dispute peacefully and avoid federal troop deployment. They were wary of provoking another Little Rock Crisis (1957), in which President Dwight D. Eisenhower had deployed 1,000 soldiers from the 101st Airborne Division. The Kennedys' overwhelming concern was that a "mini-civil war" between federal troops and armed protesters might erupt. Following the precedent of his arbitration with Alabama Governor John Patterson during the Freedom Rides, Robert had extensive telephone conversations with Barnett in hopes of resolving the issue.

On September 27, the governor offered to enroll Meredith if federal marshals made a display of threatening him at gunpoint, thereby allowing him to maintain his reputation while resolving the issue. Kennedy rejected the suggestion. In addition to Meredith's enrollment, he insisted Barnett pledge to maintain law and order. President Kennedy had extensive discussions with his staff and with Governor Barnett about protecting Meredith. Although Barnett alternated between bluster and placation while on the phone with the Kennedys, to the public he vowed to keep the university segregated. The White House made public threats of using federal forces to enforce Meredith's enrollment; Barnett believed these were little more than bluffs.

On September 28, the Fifth Circuit found Barnett to be in contempt of court and threatened to imprison and fine him $10,000 daily ($104,237 in 2024) if Meredith were not registered by October 2. During halftime at a September 29 Ole Miss football game, Barnett made a defiant 15-word speech: "I love Mississippi! I love her people! Our customs! I love and respect our heritage!" President Kennedy federalized the Mississippi National Guard shortly thereafter. The following day, rumors spread that Kennedy's federal agents were preparing to arrest Barnett at the Governor's Mansion in Jackson. The White supremacist Citizens' Councils organized a "wall of human flesh"—over 2,000 people—to surround the mansion and protect Barnett, but the alleged federal arrest never materialized. Anticipating violence at Ole Miss, 182 journalists flocked to Oxford to witness Meredith's next enrollment attempt. Photojournalists saw the visual potential of Meredith's plight: "a solitary man against thousands". Time magazine wrote that the dispute was "the gravest conflict between federal and state authority since the Civil War".

== Events ==
=== Meredith arrives ===
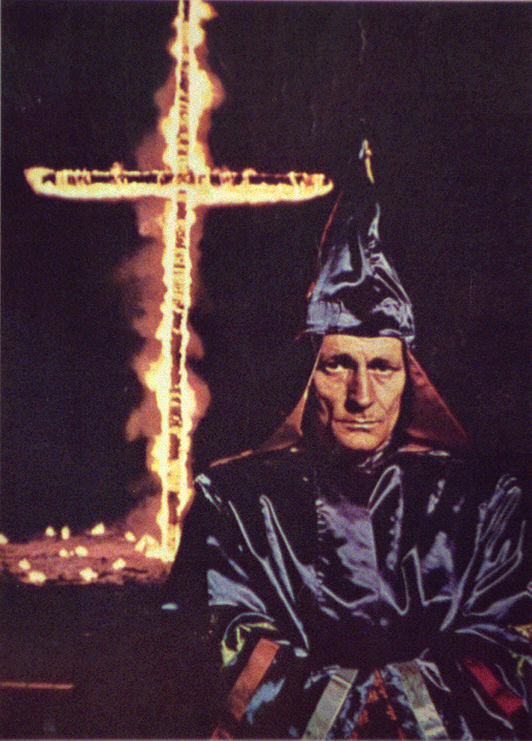
Many out-of-state Klansmen, including the lieutenants of Imperial Wizard Robert Shelton, were among the mob.

On Sunday evening, September 30, Meredith and dozens of U.S. marshals arrived on campus with plans to register the following day. Shortly before 7 p.m., he was escorted by 24 federal marshals to his guarded dormitory, Baxter Hall. Travelling on military DC-3s from Memphis, Tennessee, 538 federal law enforcement officers arrived on campus. Although often described solely as marshals, the group also contained 316 border patrolmen and 97 federal prison guards, all of whom had received special riot training. Kennedy—informed by Eisenhower's choice to send paratroopers into Little Rock—elected to send federal agents as they were less likely to upset Mississippians due to their more civilian appearance. They converted the university's administration building, the Lyceum, into their operational headquarters, and local police established barriers on campus to prevent the entry of all except for students and faculty.

In the late afternoon, Ole Miss students began gathering in front of the Lyceum. As the evening progressed, more outsiders arrived on campus and the crowd became rowdier. The Federal Bureau of Investigation (FBI) had intelligence that the lieutenants of Ku Klux Klan (KKK) Imperial Wizard Robert Shelton, as well as 19 Klansmen from Louisiana, were at the university. Democratic former Major General Edwin Walker also appeared on campus to encourage the mob. Earlier, Walker had made a radio appeal for 10,000 volunteers to "rally to the cause of freedom" at Ole Miss.

As the situation worsened, the highway patrol initially held back the crowds but were withdrawn through the influence of Barnett's ally, State Senator George Yarbrough, starting at about 7:25 p.m. Yarbrough told Chief Marshal McShane: "You have occupied this university, and now you can have it." As they abandoned the federal officers, the local and state police dismantled their barriers, allowing large numbers of agitators from other states to enter the campus. Some patrolmen even encouraged protestors to advance and attack the marshals. The Kennedys instructed the marshals not to fire under any circumstances—even if overwhelmed by the mob—except if Meredith's life was in imminent danger.

=== Violence on campus ===
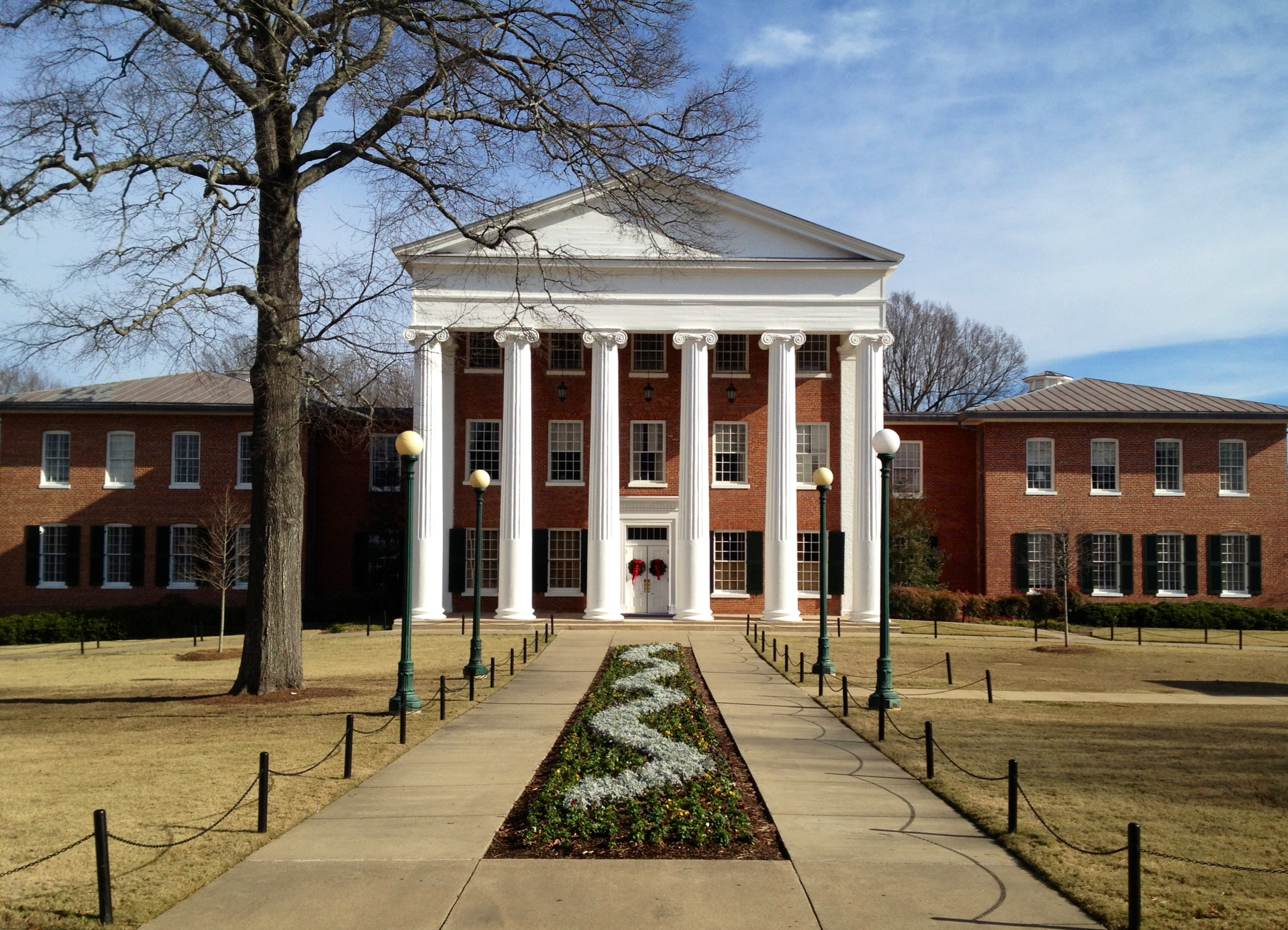
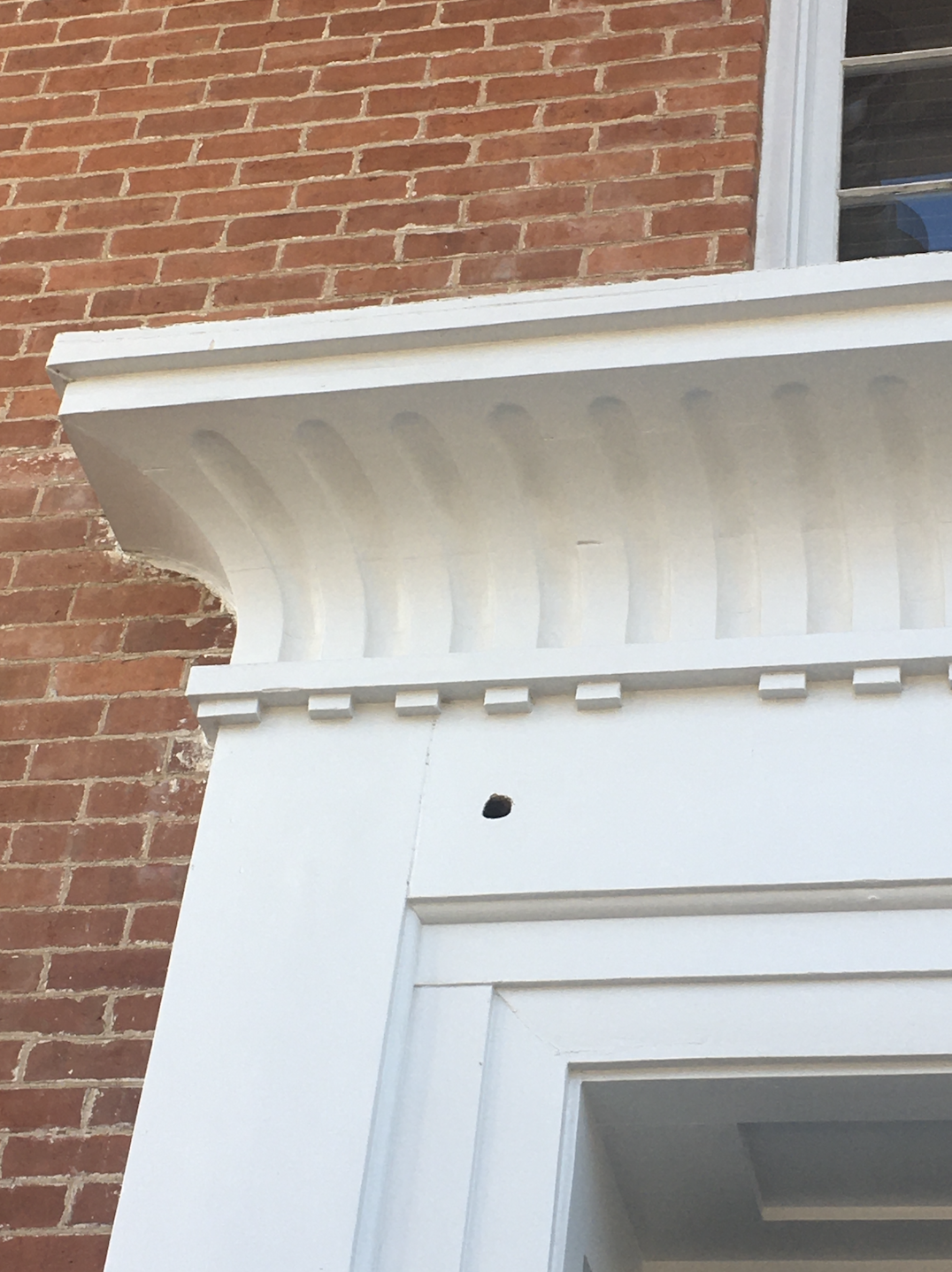
Much of the violence centered on the Lyceum, where the marshals sheltered and were besieged: a bullet hole from the night's violence is still visible in its woodwork.

Swelling to 2,500, the mob became increasingly violent and surrounded the marshals and border patrolmen that were encircling the Lyceum. The protesters began assaulting reporters and throwing Molotov cocktails and acid bottles at the marshals. Reporters and wounded marshals—as well as U.S. Deputy Attorney General Nicholas Katzenbach—sheltered in the Lyceum. At 7:50 p.m., Chief Marshal McShane ordered his federal officers to fire tear gas. (Note: In the aftermath of the riot, the Mississippi press and some university officials blamed the riot on the "trigger-happy" marshals for firing the tear gas. In response, 65 Ole Miss faculty and staff signed a public statement defending the marshals and stating that protestors had initiated the violence.) Some of the fired tear gas canisters hit members of the mob: one hit a girl in the face and another knocked a remaining state patrolman unconscious. Attempts by an Ole Miss football player and an Episcopalian rector to reason with the mob and stop the violence failed. (Note: At one point, however, Ole Miss students prevented others from removing the American flag and raising the Confederate flag.) Minutes after the tear gas was fired, President Kennedy delivered an Oval Office Address to the nation on Meredith's admission and thanked Mississippi for its contributions "to the progress of our democratic development". He was unaware of the riot: his aides were unable to inform him before he went live. (Note: According to his journals, the president's personal physician Dr. Max Jacobson was flown to the White House by private plane to "shoot up" the president before his address. Regarding the situation, he told Jacobson, "This one is a ball-breaker.")

At 11 p.m., Governor Barnett issued a radio address; many believed that he would try to deescalate the violence. However, Barnett only further encouraged the riot, declaring, "We will never surrender!" Rioters twice attempted to drive a stolen bulldozer into the marshals, and all streetlights were shot or smashed with rocks, limiting visibility. A car was flipped with a reporter still inside. The mob burned five cars and a mobile television unit. Laboratories were raided and looted by rioters hoping to find more materials for Molotov cocktails and acid bottles. At one point, a rioter commandeered a fire engine and attempted to run over the marshals multiple times. Disobeying the Kennedys' orders, a minimum of five marshals fired at least 14 shots at the engine, disabling it.

Under the cover of darkness, rioters fired at marshals and reporters. An Associated Press journalist was shot in the back with pellets but refused medical attention, continuing to file reports via the Lyceum's telephone. At 1 a.m., reporter Karl Fleming was almost killed by a sniper; three shots hit the Lyceum wall around his head. Marshal Graham Same of Indianapolis nearly died after a bullet hit his neck, and 26 other marshals were wounded by gunfire. Ultimately, half of the marshals were injured. A single country doctor—Dr. L. G. Hopkins—cared for the wounded in the Lyceum throughout the night. Barnett agreed to a request from President Kennedy to order the state police return to the campus, which they never did. However, Lieutenant Governor Johnson did intervene to prevent the dismissed state troopers from joining in the attack. This prevented what would likely have been a brutal massacre, and Johnson himself later stated that, had he not prevented the troopers from sieging the campus, "there wouldn't have been a marshal left standing".

=== Military response ===
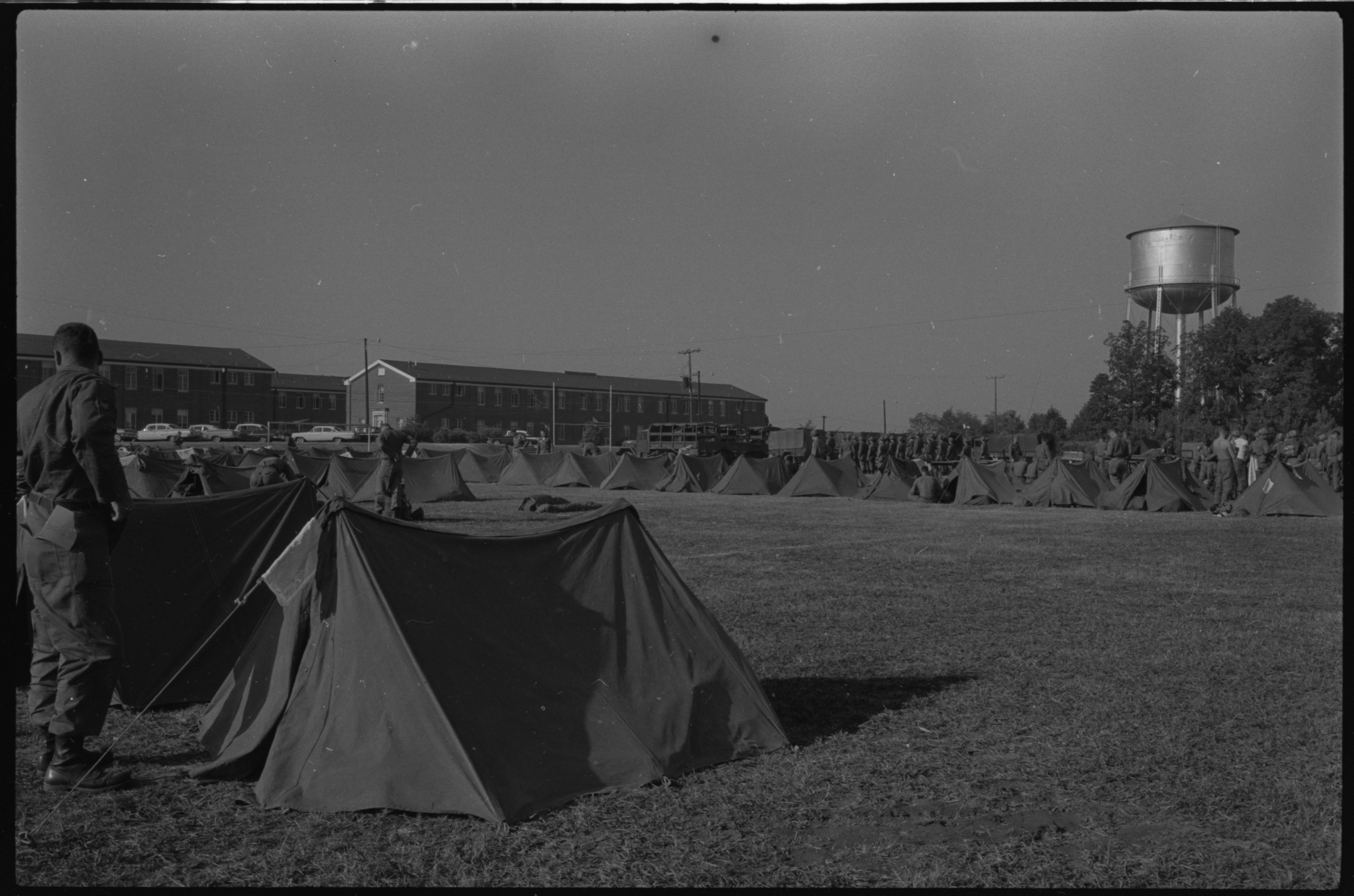
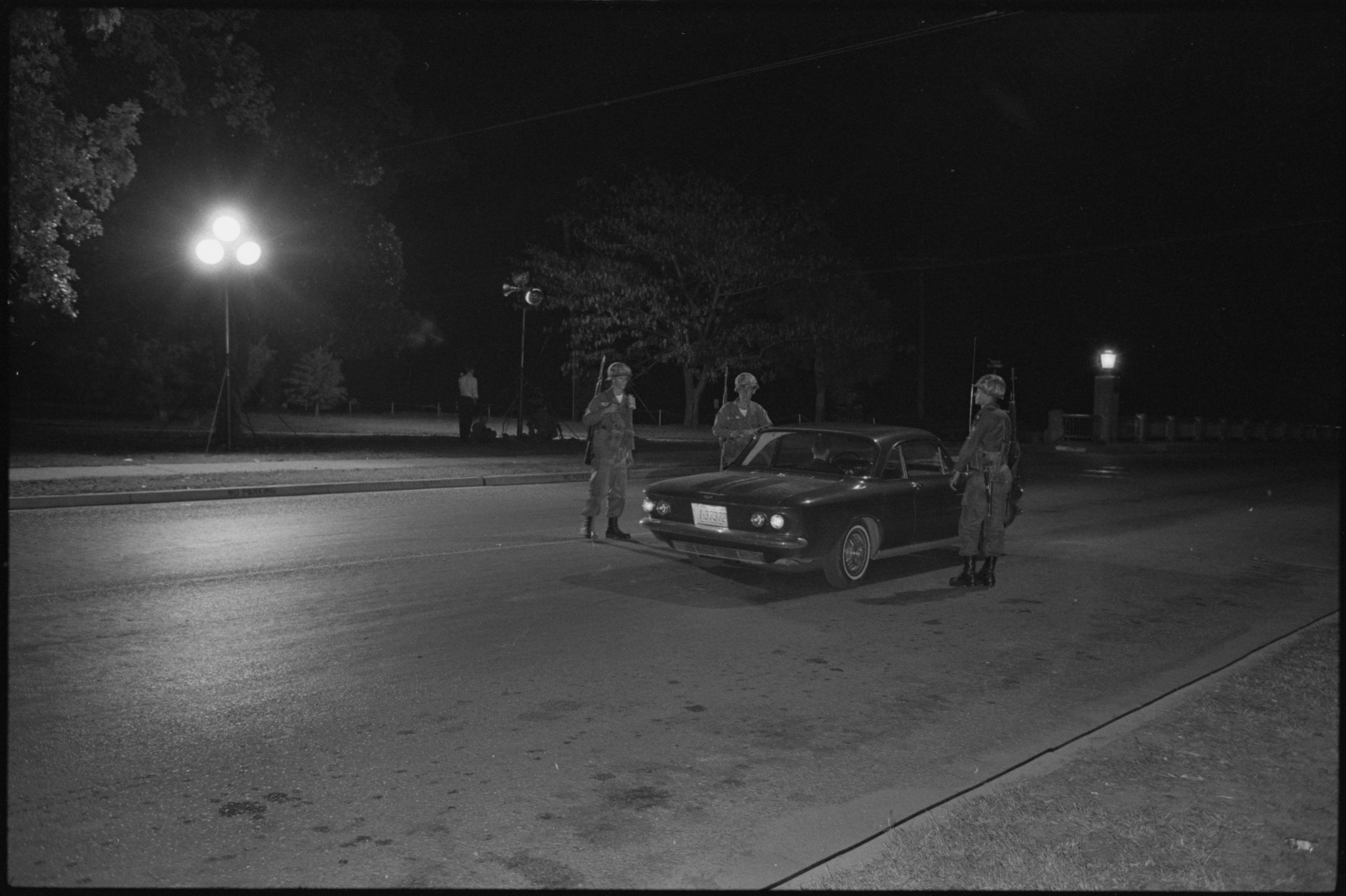
Almost 31,000 troops (pictured on campus) were ultimately mobilized in response to the riot, the most ever for a single disturbance in America.

President Kennedy initially considered using a helicopter to extract Meredith from the campus. However, it was unclear whether a landing was even possible due to crowds and debris, and Kennedy was concerned that Meredith would be assassinated before he could reach the helicopter. At around 10 p.m., with no other option, President Kennedy invoked the Insurrection Act of 1807 and ordered the U.S. Army to suppress the riot, beginning with the dedicated anti-riot battalion of the 503rd Military Police (MP).

Despite Kennedy having federalized the Mississippi National Guard two days prior, only the 67 guardsmen of Troop E were immediately available in Oxford. Led by Captain Murry Falkner—nephew of Nobel Prize-winning writer and longtime Oxford resident William Faulkner—Troop E drove to Ole Miss, albeit without any ammunition (a direct order from Deputy Attorney General Katzenbach to avoid civilian deaths). The guardsmen's trucks and jeeps were immediately attacked with projectiles—a hurled concrete slab broke Falkner's arm—but continued to the Lyceum, where they reinforced the marshals. Soon thereafter, 165 more guardsmen from Troop E arrived. Falkner later stated that if the National Guard had arrived any later, the rioters would have breached the Lyceum and killed all of the marshals.

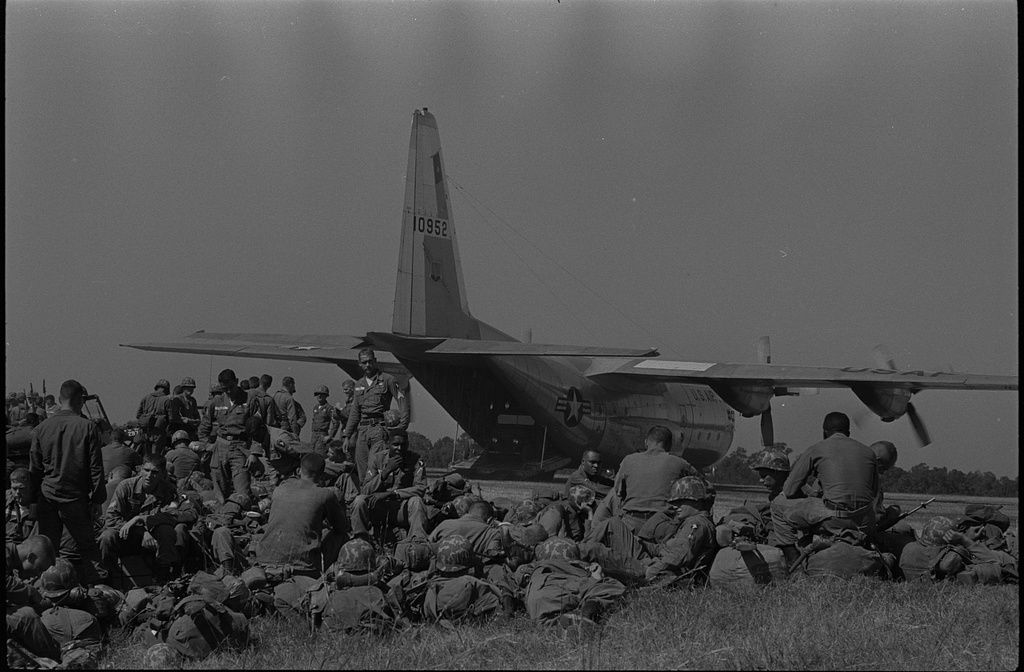
Later support like the 101st Airborne Division arrived on C-130 Hercules aircraft (pictured October 8).

The Pentagon tasked Brigadier General Charles Billingslea with organizing the "invasion" of North Mississippi and ordered him to deploy the entirety of the 108th Cavalry Regiment to Oxford. However, Secretary of the Army Cyrus Vance ordered Billingslea simply to move the military police units there. To complicate it further, President Kennedy instructed Billingslea to fly directly to Oxford, survey the situation, and then determine the necessary troop count. Then Vance reversed, instructing Billingslea to instead move the entire regiment to Oxford. Faced with conflicting orders, Billingslea divided the MP "Task Force Alpha" into two and sent one group of the 503rd MP battalion directly to Ole Miss from Memphis via helicopter. The rest would travel via slower land convoys. After finding it impossible to land on campus, they diverted and landed at the Oxford Airport. This marked the first time American combat troops were in active status in Mississippi since Union forces pulled out in 1877.

Shortly after 2 a.m., U.S. Army troops—the first detachment of the 503rd MP—arrived at Ole Miss. Throughout the morning, more squadrons arrived on campus, including the 716th Military Police Battalion and the 108th Armored Cavalry Regiment. This number eventually reached 13,000. They secured the campus and forced the rioters out of Ole Miss. However, they simply continued to riot in Oxford's town center (known as the "Square"). After a plea from the mayor, the last of the rioting was finally quelled late in the morning of October 1. At this point, the army evacuated the wounded from the Lyceum and began arresting rioters. Of the 300 arrested, only a third were students from Ole Miss. (Note: Billingslea's troops also apprehended a group of Mississippi State University (MSU) students with a cache of M1 rifles stolen from the MSU Reserve Officers' Training Corps.) Walker was among those arrested. He was charged with insurrection, although the charges were later dropped. On October 1, members of the 716th Battalion raided the Sigma Nu fraternity house—whose president Trent Lott later became the Republican majority-leader in the U.S. Senate—and discovered a large weapons cache.

Troop arrivals continued: soldiers from the 82nd Airborne Division and 101st Airborne Division arrived in Oxford on C-124 Globemaster aircraft. A unit of the 101st Airborne Division arrived by convoy from Ft. Campbell, Ky. Machine gun nests were set up along roadways, and a radio observation post was established on the roof of the Oxford Elementary School. The strength of all forces mobilized was nearly 31,000—the largest for a single disturbance in American history. At the peak of the military presence there were 20,000 troops camping on campus, outnumbering students 5-to-1.

=== Aftermath ===
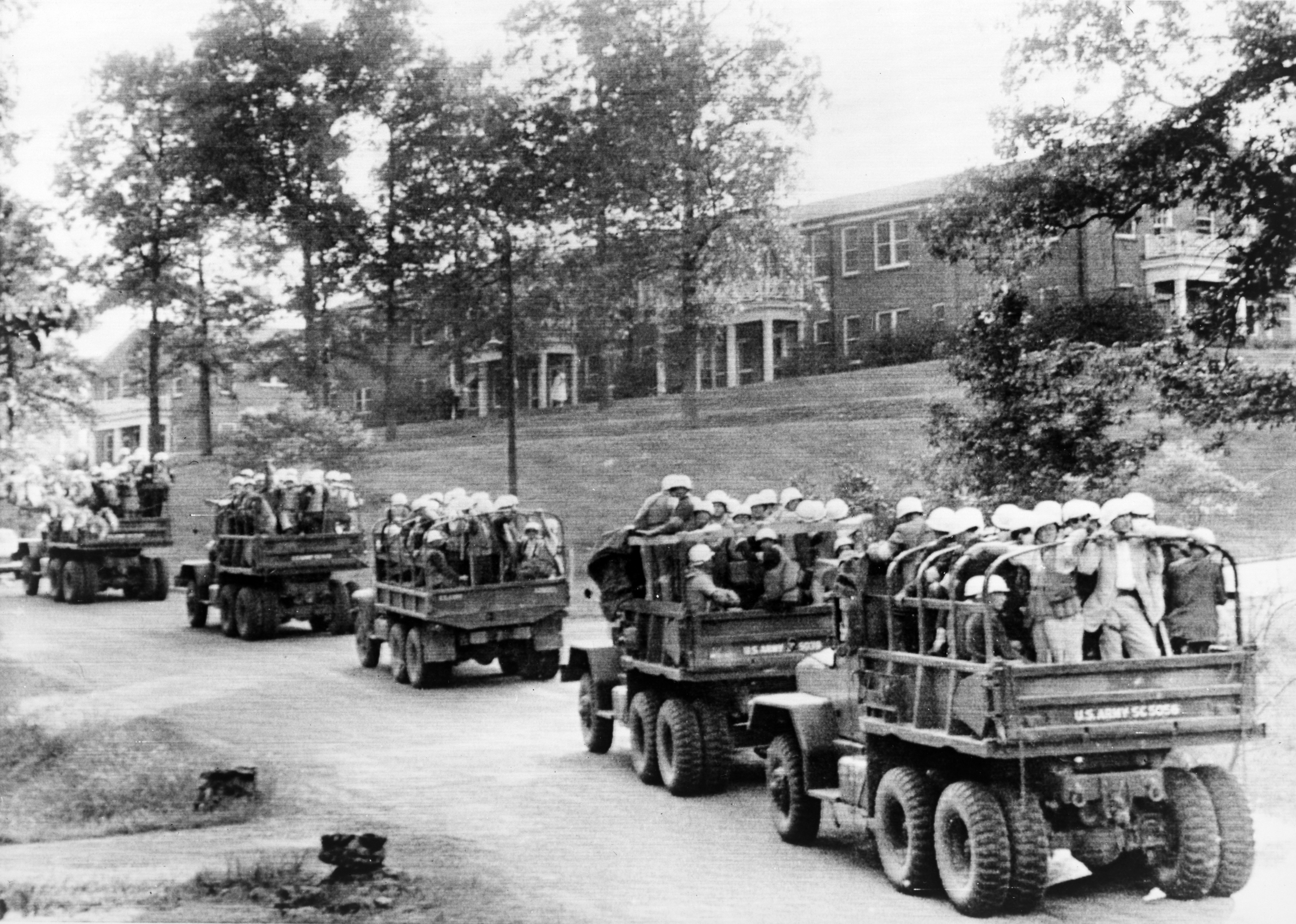
U.S. Army trucks carrying U.S Marshals on October 3

Two civilians were killed during the riots: French journalist Paul Guihard, on assignment for Agence France-Presse, who was found behind the Lyceum building with a gunshot wound to the back; and 23-year-old Ray Gunter, a white jukebox repairman who had visited the campus out of curiosity. (Note: According to historian William Doyle, "It was a sheer miracle that scores, if not hundreds, of Americans were not slaughtered that night.") Gunter was found with a bullet wound in his forehead. Law enforcement officials described these as execution-style killings. They were likely not killed by stray fire from federal officers: the FBI found that the killing bullets matched none of the 450 examined guns belonging to the marshals, border patrolmen, or federal prison guards. However, personal weapons of agents who quit their respective services after the riot were not examined.

The day after the riot, Barnett called the DOJ and made a final offer: the state of Mississippi would foot the bill if Meredith enrolled at any other university in the country; this offer was refused. On October 1, 1962, Meredith became the first African American student to be enrolled at the University of Mississippi, and attended his first class, in American Colonial History. His admission marked the first integration of a public educational facility in Mississippi. Following rumors of dynamite in Baxter Hall, an October 31 search by troops and campus police discovered a grenade, gasoline, and a .22-calibre rifle, among other weapons. Racist agitation continued on the campus, with the state attorney general calling for students to not fraternize with the "intruder" Meredith. There were continued threats on Meredith's life: the FBI was informed that the KKK planned to lynch Meredith when military security was eased. At this time, there were still hundreds of troops guarding Meredith 24 hours a day. In order to appease local sensitivities, 4,000 black soldiers were removed under Robert Kennedy's secret orders. Meredith decried the move.

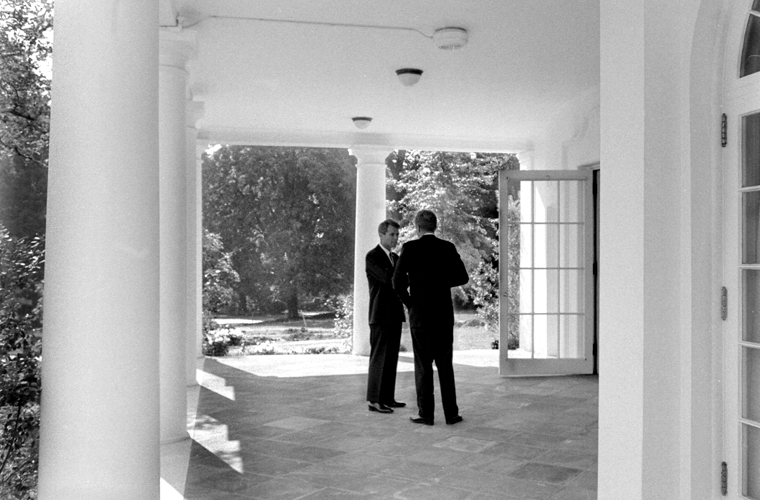
The Kennedys confer outside the White House on October 3.

Although press coverage of the Kennedys' handling of the riot was largely positive and glossed over their poor planning and execution, their handling of the crisis angered both white and black Southerners. According to Louis F. Oberdorfer, Robert Kennedy underestimated the "extent to which segregation in the South was undergirded by violence", and he reportedly blamed himself for failing to prevent the riot. He privately accused Secretary of the Army Vance of providing the president with poor and misleading advice and delaying the military's arrival. After a request by the university, Chairman of the Senate Judiciary Committee James Eastland (Mississippi) began preparing a subcommittee led by Senator Sam Ervin (North Carolina) to investigate the riot. Barnett had Eastland quash the subcommittee. Instead, the Mississippi Legislature and a Lafayette County grand jury conducted investigations, and blamed the marshals and DOJ for the violence. In November 1962, the Mississippi Senate called for Kennedy to be impeached for "inciting riot" (sic). Although the Kennedy administration was initially concerned that the handling of the riot could affect the 1962 midterms, the Cuban Missile Crisis and Kennedy's successful resolution thereof effectively changed the national conversation.

== Legacy ==
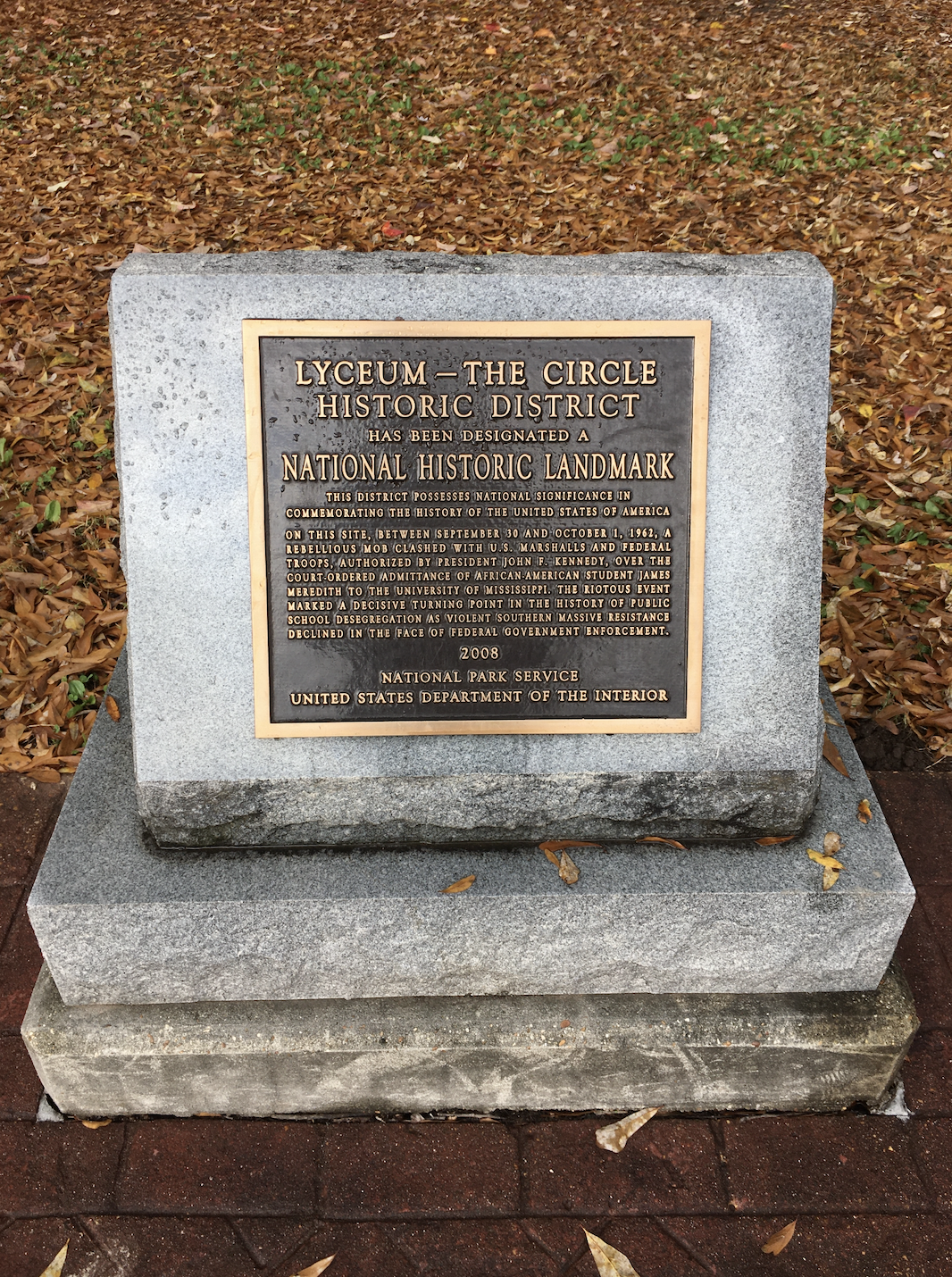
A plaque marking the site of the riot (the Lyceum–The Circle Historic District) as a National Historical Site

A triumph of the rule of law, Meredith's admission was a pivotal movement in the civil rights movement—clearly demonstrating the federal government's willingness to use force to ensure equal rights for African Americans—and was the final time troops were deployed during the struggle. According to historian William Doyle, Meredith's admission "crushed forever" the segregationist tactic of massive resistance. Politician Horace Harned—a member of the Mississippi State Sovereignty Commission—called the riot the symbolic final battle of the Civil War, a final failed push to enact state sovereignty in opposition to federal power. In its wake, Southerners began to recognize and accept the inevitability of integration. Illustrative of the riot's impact, during the "Stand in the Schoolhouse Door" at the University of Alabama the following year, segregationist Governor George Wallace capitulated expressly to prevent another Ole Miss.

In 2002, Ole Miss marked the 40th anniversary of integration with a yearlong series of events, including an oral history of the university, symposiums, a memorial, and a reunion of federal marshals who served at the campus. In 2006, the 44th anniversary of integration, a statue of Meredith was dedicated on campus. Two years later, the site of the riot was designated as a National Historic Landmark. In 2009, a bench was dedicated to Guihard on campus by the Society of Professional Journalists. The university also held a yearlong program to mark the 50th anniversary of integration in 2012. (Note: Meredith criticized the commemoration, saying "You know, I got a degree from Ole Miss in political science, history and French. I ain't never heard of a Frenchman celebrating Waterloo. They not only kept me out ... they kept all of my blood before me out forever, and I'm supposed to celebrate that?")

The 1963 Pulitzer Prize for Editorial Writing was awarded to Ira B. Harkey Jr. for his coverage of Meredith's admission, Barnett's resistance, and the riot. The riot inspired protest songs like Phil Ochs' "The Ballad of Oxford", and Bob Dylan's "Oxford Town", which appeared on his 1963 album The Freewheelin' Bob Dylan. Billy Joel included "Ole Miss" in reference to the riot in his 1989 song "We Didn't Start the Fire".

== Notes and references ==
=== Works cited ===
- Branch, Taylor (1988). Parting the Waters: America in the King Years, 1954–63. Simon & Schuster. ISBN 9780671687427.
- Bryant, Nick (Autumn 2006). "The Black Man Who Was Crazy Enough to Apply to Ole Miss". The Journal of Blacks in Higher Education (53): 60–71. JSTOR 25073538. (subscription required)
- Cohodas, Nadine (Summer 1997). "James Meredith and the Integration of Ole Miss". The Journal of Blacks in Higher Education. 16 (16): 112–122. doi:10.2307/2962922. JSTOR 2962922. (subscription required)
- Doyle, William (2001). An American Insurrection. Doubleday. ISBN 9780385499699.
- Eagles, Charles W. (2009). The Price of Defiance: James Meredith and the Integration of Ole Miss. University of North Carolina Press. ISBN 9781469613949.
- Eliot, Marc (1990). Phil Ochs, Death of a Rebel. Omnibus Press. ISBN 9780711920866.
- Gallagher, Henry (2012). James Meredith and the Ole Miss Riot: A Soldier's Story. University Press of Mississippi. ISBN 9781617036538.
- Heylin, Clinton (2009). Revolution in the Air: The Songs of Bob Dylan 1957–1973. Chicago Review Press. ISBN 9781613743362.
- Heymann, C. Davis (1998). RFK: A Candid Biography of Robert F. Kennedy. Dutton Adult. ISBN 9780525942177.
- Kennedy, Robert F. (May 1, 1988). Guthman, Edwin O.; Shulman, Jeffrey (eds.). Robert Kennedy in His Own Words: The Unpublished Recollections of the Kennedy Years. Bantam. ISBN 9780553053166.
- Lambert, Frank (2009). The Battle of Ole Miss. Oxford University Press. ISBN 9780195380415.
- Roberts, Gene; Klibanoff, Hank (2006). The Race Beat. Vintage Books. ISBN 9780679735656.
- Rosenberg, Jonathan; Karabell, Zachary (2003). Kennedy, Johnson, and the Quest for Justice: The Civil Rights Tapes. W.W. Norton. ISBN 9780393349719.
- Sansing, David (1999). The University of Mississippi: A Sesquicentennial History. University Press of Mississippi. ISBN 9781578060917.
- Scheips, Paul J. (2005). "The Riot at Oxford" (PDF). The Role of Federal Military Forces in Domestic Disorders, 1945–1992 (PDF). Center of Military History, U.S. Army. pp. 101–136. ISBN 9780160723612. Archived from the original on March 11, 2021.
- Schlesinger, Arthur (2002) [1978]. Robert Kennedy and His Times. First Mariner Books. ISBN 0618219285.
- Silver, James (2012) [1964]. Mississippi: The Closed Society. University Press of Mississippi. ISBN 9781617033124.
- Tye, Larry (2016). Bobby Kennedy: The Making of a Liberal Icon. Random House. ISBN 9780812993349.
- Wickham, Kathleen Woodruff (Summer 2011). "Murder in Mississippi: The Unsolved Case of Agence French-Presse's Paul Guihard". Journalism History. 37 (2): 102–112. doi:10.1080/00947679.2011.12062849. S2CID 140820029.
