= Charles Billingslea =

U.S. Army Major General

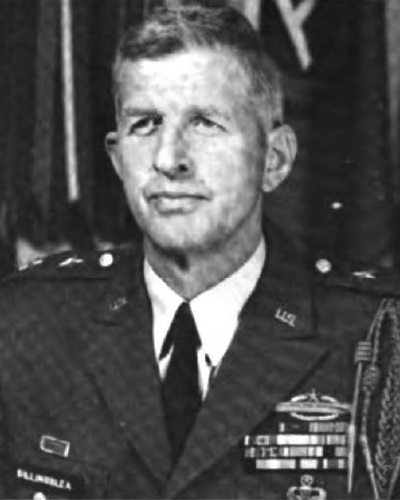
- MG Charles Billingslea
- Born: May 16, 1914; Chicago, Illinois, United States
- Died: March 14, 1989 (aged 74); Washington, D.C., United States
- Military career
- Allegiance: United States
- Branch: United States Army
- Service years: 1936–1966
- Rank: Major General
- Nickname: "Chuck"
- Service number: 0-20367
- Unit: Infantry Branch
- Commands: 325th Glider Infantry Regiment; 2nd Infantry Division
- Conflicts: World War II; Operation Torch; Tunisian campaign; Allied invasion of Sicily; Operation Avalanche; Battle of Anzio; Operation Market Garden; Battle of the Bulge; Rhineland campaign; Korean War; Ole Miss riot of 1962
- Awards: Distinguished Service Cross (2); Army Distinguished Service Medal; Bronze Star Medal (2); Army Commendation Medal (2); Order of National Security Merit

Major General Charles Billingslea (May 16, 1914 – March 14, 1989) was a highly decorated United States Army officer. A graduate of the United States Military Academy (USMA) and a trained parachutist, Billingslea received the Distinguished Service Cross (DSC), the second highest decoration in the United States Armed Forces for heroism in combat, during World War II.

Following the war, he remained in the army, eventually reaching general officer's rank and going on to hold several important assignments including command of the 2nd Infantry Division (Indianhead) or Deputy Commanding General, U.S. Army Combat Development Command. He also led the forces that enforced desegregation at the University of Mississippi, during the Ole Miss riot of 1962, and later led forces in Birmingham, Alabama, to maintain the peace during demonstrations led by Martin Luther King Jr. to end segregation.

== Early career ==
Charles Billingslea was born on May 16, 1914, in Chicago, Illinois, as the son of Charles and Mabel Graeme Billingslea. His father served as Army Surgeon and died from an accidental gunshot wound, while stationed as Major and Chief of the sanitation work at Camp Meade, Maryland, in August 1917. Young Charles followed in his father's footsteps and completed the Army preparatory school at Fort McPherson, Georgia and received an appointment to the United States Military Academy (USMA) at West Point, New York, in June 1932.

He was in the same class as future distinguished generals Creighton Abrams, Richard H. Carmichael, Albert P. Clark, Benjamin O. Davis Jr., Joseph J. Nazzaro, Bruce Palmer Jr., William T. Ryder, William P. Yarborough and William Westmoreland. Billingslea graduated with Bachelor of Science on June 12, 1936, and was commissioned a second lieutenant in the Infantry Branch. He was subsequently ordered to Hawaii, where he joined the 19th Infantry Regiment.

While in Hawaii, Billingslea saw temporary duty with the United States Navy during the United States claim to the Phoenix Islands in the Central Pacific and returned to the United States for duty with 30th and 53rd Infantry Regiments at the Presidio and at Fort Ord in California. He was promoted successively to first lieutenant on June 12, 1939, and to Captain on September 9, 1940.

== World War II ==
Following the establishment of Army Airborne School at Fort Benning, Georgia in June 1940, Billingslea was ordered for paratrooper training and earned his wings several months later. Upon the graduation, he was attached as Company commander to the 502nd Parachute Infantry Battalion and later was transferred to the 503rd Parachute Infantry Battalion.

On February 1, 1942, Billingslea was promoted to the temporary rank of Major and ordered to London, England, where he served on the headquarters, II Corps under Major General Mark W. Clark, before he was attached as an observer to the British 1st Parachute Brigade for the upcoming Operation Torch, the invasion of French North Africa. He later participated with the British brigade in the several airborne operations in Tunisia and was promoted to the temporary rank of lieutenant colonel on March 14, 1943.

Billingslea subsequently rejoined general Clark's headquarters of Fifth Army and participated in the last phase of the Tunisian campaign. Following the surrender of the Afrika Korps, he assumed duty as Executive officer of Pathfinder battalion of 82nd Airborne Division and took part in Operation Husky, the Allied invasion of Sicily, in July–August 1943.

Several weeks later, Billingslea was appointed Executive officer, 504th Parachute Infantry Regiment under Colonel Reuben H. Tucker and participated in the Operation Avalanche, the Allied landings near the port of Salerno in September 1943 and later in the Battle of Anzio in early 1944. For his service in Italy, Billingslea was decorated with two Bronze Star Medals and also earned the Combat Infantryman Badge.

His regiment was withdrawn to England for rest and refit in mid-1944 and Billingslea was appointed the commanding officer, 325th Glider Infantry Regiment by the end of August 1944. His regiment was scheduled for Operation Market Garden in mid-September 1944, but Billingslea and his regiment were unable to take off due to bad weather. He finally received permission to reinforce units in the Netherlands several days later, but it was too late to change the result of the campaign.

Billingslea and his regiment spent the next two weeks with intensive combats, before assuming defensive positions in the vicinity of the town of Katerbosch. He subsequently commenced counter-attack before dawn and under cover of fog which lifted without warning in mid-morning and exposed his forces to intense artillery fire. Key officers and men became casualties, but Billingslea moved among the disorganized company, restored command and assumed the initiative in the face of determined resistance from numerous German strongpoints in Katerbosch. He personally directed the house-to-house reduction of the enemy and his presence in this critical zone inspired officers and men to emulate his conduct in a fight for the town which lasted all day and through the night. In this valiant and successful assault on Katerbosch, Billingslea defeated powerful German efforts to break through Mook and sever the Allied corridor in Germany.

For this act of heroism and leadership, Billingslea was decorated with the Distinguished Service Cross (DSC), the second highest decoration of the United States military for heroism in combat. He also received the Military Order of William by the Government of the Netherlands. The citation for his DSC reads:

The President of the United States of America, authorized by Act of Congress, July 9, 1918, takes pleasure in presenting the Distinguished Service Cross to Colonel (Infantry), [then Lieutenant Colonel] Charles Billingslea (ASN: 0-20367), United States Army, for extraordinary heroism in connection with military operations against an armed enemy while serving as Commanding Officer, 325th Glider Infantry Regiment, 82d Airborne Division, in action against enemy forces on 2–3 October 1944, in the vicinity of Katerbosch, Holland. Through fearless and skillful leadership, Colonel Billingslea inspired victory for his regiment in a battle for objectives two miles beyond the forward lines near Mook. Leading troops who were tired after five days of incessant attack, he pushed the enemy back in a twenty-four hour assault. He launched the attack before dawn and under cover of fog which lifted without warning in mid-morning and exposed his forces to intense artillery fire. Key officers and men became casualties, but Colonel Billingslea moved among the disorganized company, restored command and assumed the initiative in the face if determined resistance from numerous German strongpoints in Katerbosch. He personally directed the house-to-house reduction of the enemy. His presence in this critical zone inspired officers and men to emulate his conduct in a fight for the town which lasted all day and through the night. In this valiant and successful assault on Katerbosch, Colonel Billingslea defeated powerful German efforts to break through Mook and sever the Allied corridor in the Motherland. His inspiring leadership, personal bravery and zealous devotion to duty exemplify the highest traditions of the military forces of the United States and reflect great credit upon himself, the 82d Airborne Division, and the United States Army.

In addition, he was promoted to the temporary rank of colonel on October 29, 1944.

Billingslea led his regiment during the Battle of the Bulge and during the advance to the Rhine in January–February 1945. He distinguished himself again on February 2, 1945, during combat on the Siegfried Line, when he fearlessly exposed himself to intense enemy small arms, mortar, and artillery fire to direct his command's assault against Siegfried Line fortifications. When elements of his regiment were pinned to the ground by fierce crossfire, he advanced to the area and personally directed his command in thwarting the hostile thrust. During a second vicious counterattack, he proceeded to his reserve battalion, directed the commitment of his reserves and repulsed the counter-attack. Billingslea was subsequently decorated with a second DSC, the citation for which reads:

The President of the United States of America, authorized by Act of Congress, July 9, 1918, takes pleasure in presenting a Bronze Oak Leaf Cluster in lieu of a Second Award of the Distinguished Service Cross to Colonel (Infantry) Charles Billingslea (ASN: 0-20367), United States Army, for extraordinary heroism in connection with military operations against an armed enemy while serving as Commanding Officer, 325th Glider Infantry Regiment, 82d Airborne Division, in action against enemy forces on 2 February 1945, in Germany. Colonel Billingslea fearlessly exposed himself to intense enemy small arms, mortar, and artillery fire to direct his command's assault against Siegfried Line fortifications. When elements of his regiment were pinned to the ground by fierce crossfire, he advanced to the area and personally directed his command in thwarting the hostile thrust. During a second vicious counterattack, he proceeded to his reserve battalion, directed the commitment of his reserves and repulsed the counter-attack. By his display of conspicuous courage and selfless devotion to duty, Colonel Billingslea was instrumental in saving a vital position and insuring the continued success of his regiment. His intrepid actions, personal bravery and zealous devotion to duty exemplify the highest traditions of the military forces of the United States and reflect great credit upon himself, the 82d Airborne Division, and the United States Army.

The 325th Glider Infantry Regiment finished its advance into Germany near Ludwigslust, past the Elbe River and Billingslea was appointed Chief of Staff, 82nd Airborne Division under Major General James M. Gavin on May 7, 1945. One day later, Nazi Germany surrendered. On May 25, 1945, the Soviet Red Army decorated Billingslea with the Order of the Red Star - one of 15 82nd Airborne Division personnel the Soviets decorated during the war.

== Postwar service ==
Following the surrender of Nazi Germany, the 82nd Airborne Division was ordered to Berlin for occupation duty. Billingslea remained there until December 1945 and then returned with the division to the United States, arriving on January 3, 1946, aboard the RMS Queen Mary. Upon his return stateside, he was attached to the planning staff of the Army Ground Forces at Fort Monroe, Virginia, and was reverted to his peacetime rank of captain on June 12, 1946.

Billingslea served in this capacity until early 1949, when he was attached to the faculty of the Army Command and General Staff School at Fort Leavenworth, Kansas. He also held additional duty on the faculty at the Army War College in Washington, D.C., and was promoted to the rank of major.

In August 1950, Billingslea was assigned to the Office of Operational Research in Washington, D.C., and also saw temporary duty in Korea, where he was involved in the effort to liberate Major General William F. Dean who was taken a prisoner of war following the Battle of Taejon in July 1950. While in this capacity, he was promoted again to the temporary rank of colonel on June 29, 1951, but was reverted to the peacetime rank of Major several months later.

Billingslea was ordered to the Army War College in Washington, D.C., in July 1952 and following his graduation one year later was promoted to the permanent rank of lieutenant colonel on July 7, 1953. He was then ordered to Paris and appointed Chief of Plans at Supreme Headquarters Allied Powers Europe (SHAPE) under General Alfred Gruenther, whom he knew from his service with Fifth Army in Italy during World War II.

Upon his return to the United States in summer 1956, Billingslea graduated from the Advanced Management Program at the Harvard University in July 1957 and then entered the National War College, where he graduated one year later.

Billingslea was subsequently promoted to the permanent rank of Colonel and assumed duty as deputy director, European Region, International Security Affairs, Department of Defense at the Pentagon. While in this capacity, he was promoted to the rank of brigadier general and ordered to Korea in early 1961, where he joined the headquarters, U.S. Eighth Army under General Carter B. Magruder as his Deputy Chief of Staff. During his service in Far East, Billingslea was decorated with the Order of Military Merit, 3rd Class by the Government of South Korea.

Following his return to the United States in May 1962, Billingslea was attached to the Howze Board at Fort Bragg, North Carolina, which was tasked with the review and test of new concepts integrating helicopters into the United States Army.

In September 1962, Billingslea was ordered to the headquarters, 2nd Infantry Division ("Indianhead") at Fort Benning, Georgia, where he succeeded Charles H. Chase as commanding general. Only two weeks later, he mobilized both Army troops and the 4,000 troops of the 108th Armored Cavalry Regiment of the Mississippi National Guard who were "federalized" to restore order during the Ole Miss riot, in response to the enrollment of the first African American student, James Meredith. He successfully restored order on the second day of the riots, leaving two dead and over 300 injured.

Billingslea was promoted to the rank of major general in early 1963 and served with the 2nd Infantry Division until September 1964, when he was appointed Deputy Commanding General, U.S. Army Combat Development Command at Fort Belvoir, Virginia. He served in this capacity until June 30, 1966, when he retired after 30 years of active service. Billingslea was decorated with Army Distinguished Service Medal for his service at Fort Belvoir and with 2nd Infantry Division.

== Retirement ==
Following his retirement from the Army, Billingslea settled in Washington, D.C., and served as a trustee for the Sheridan School there. During his tenure, he developed a mountain campus for the school. Billingslea later moved to Oxford, Maryland, in 1981 and served as president of the board of the Oxford University Museum of Natural History. He was also involved in the erection of American Soldier's Statue at the West Point.

Major general Charles Billingslea died of emphysema on March 18, 1989, aged 74, at Walter Reed Army Medical Center in Washington, D.C. He was buried at Church of the Holy Trinity in Oxford, Maryland. His wife Bettina Louise Hill (1917–2009) of Brookline, Massachusetts is buried beside him. They had one son, Charles IV.

== Decorations ==
Major General Charles Billingslea's ribbon bar:

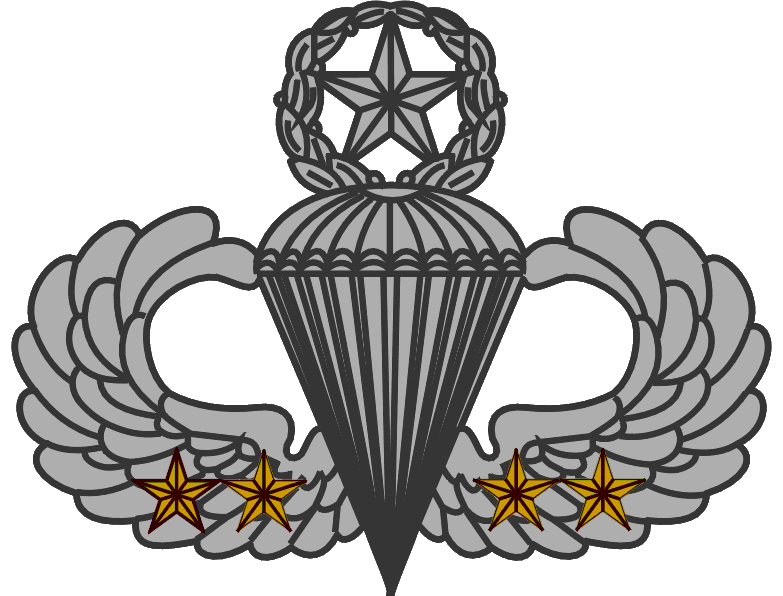

Master Parachutists Badge with four combat jumps
Combat Infantryman Badge
1st Row	Distinguished Service Cross with Oak Leaf Cluster			
2nd Row	Army Distinguished Service Medal	Bronze Star Medal with Oak Leaf Cluster	Army Commendation Medal with Oak Leaf Cluster	American Defense Service Medal
3rd Row	American Campaign Medal	European-African-Middle Eastern Campaign Medal with one silver and one bronze 3/16 inch service stars and Arrowhead device	World War II Victory Medal	Army of Occupation Medal
4th Row	National Defense Service Medal with Oak Leaf Cluster	Dutch Military Order of William, Knight	Korean Order of Military Merit, 3rd Class	Soviet Order of the Red Star
Presidential Unit Citation

Military offices
Preceded by Charles H. Chase	Commanding General 2nd Infantry Division; 1962–1964	Succeeded by John H. Chiles
