= David Sansing =

American historian and author (1933–2019)

David Gaffney Sansing (June 15, 1933 – July 6, 2019) was a history professor and author in Mississippi who wrote extensively about the state's history. He was a professor emeritus at the University of Mississippi at the time of his death.

Sansing was born in Greenville, Mississippi, and served in the Army during the Korean War. Upon his return, he received his bachelor's and master's degrees from Mississippi College and his PhD from the University of Southern Mississippi. He was hired at Ole Miss in 1970.

He wrote about various aspects of the state's history. His books The University of Mississippi: A Sesquicentennial History is considered to be the definitive history of the university. It was published for the school's sesquicentennial.

Sansing died on July 6, 2019, at a hospital in Memphis, Tennessee, following a fall at home.

== Writings ==
- Mississippi Governors: Soldiers, Statesmen, Scholars and Scoundrels
- The University of Mississippi: A Sesquicentennial History
- Making Haste Slowly: The Troubled History of Higher Education in Mississippi
- A History of the Mississippi Governor’s Mansion with Carroll Waller
- Mississippi: A Study of Your State with Ray Skates
- Mississippi: Its People and Culture
- Discovering Mississippi
- A Troubled History: The Governance of Higher Education in Mississippi The Nautilus Publishing Company
- What Was Freedom's Price, editor University of Mississippi Press (1978)
- The Other Mississippi: A State in Conflict with Itself (2018)
- "David Holmes, First and Fifth Governor of Mississippi: 1817-1820; 1826"
