= History of military logistics =

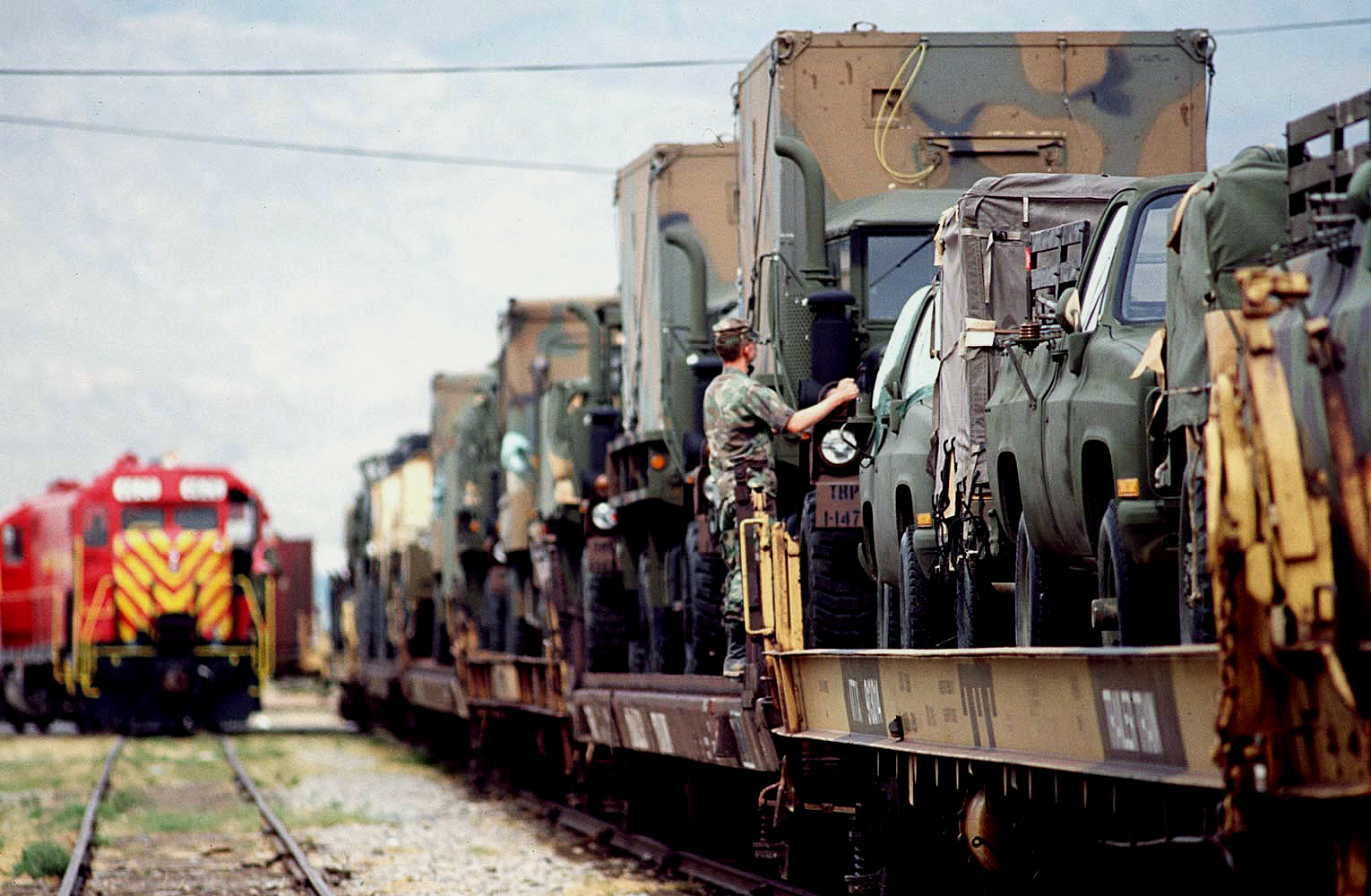
U.S. Army vehicles arrive by train at Biggs Army Airfield in El Paso, Texas, for Exercise Roving Sands in 1997

The history of military logistics goes back to Neolithic times. The most basic requirements of an army are food and water. Early armies were equipped with weapons used for hunting like spears, knives, axes and bows and arrows, and were small due to the practical difficulty of supplying a large number of soldiers. Large armies began to appear in the Iron Age. Animals such as horses, oxen, camels and even elephants were used to carry supplies. Food, water and fodder for the animals could usually be found or purchased in the field. The Roman Empire and Maurya Empire in India built networks of roads, but it was far less expensive to transport by sea than by road. After the fall of the Western Roman Empire in the fifth century there was a shift in Western Europe away from a centrally organised army.

Starting in the late sixteenth century, armies in Europe increased in size, to 100,000 or more in some cases. When operating in enemy territory an army was forced to plunder the local countryside for supplies, which allowed war to be conducted at the enemy's expense. However, with the increase in army sizes, this reliance on pillage and plunder became problematic, as decisions regarding where and when an army could move or fight became based not on strategic objectives but on whether a given area was capable of supporting the soldiers' needs. Sieges in particular were affected by this, both for an army attempting to lay siege to a town and one coming to its relief. Unless a commander was able to arrange a form of regular resupply, a fortress or town with a devastated countryside could become immune to either operation. Napoleon made logistics a major part of his strategy. He dispersed his corps along a broad front to maximise the area from which supplies could be drawn. Each day forage parties brought in supplies. This differed from earlier operations living off the land in the size of the forces involved, and because the primary motivation was the emperor's desire for mobility. Ammunition could not as a rule be obtained locally, but it was still possible to carry sufficient ammunition for an entire campaign.

The nineteenth century saw technological developments that facilitated immense improvements to the storage, handling and transportation of supplies which made it easier to support an army from the rear. Canning simplified storage and distribution of foods, and reduced waste and the incidence of food-related illness. Refrigeration allowed frozen meat and fresh produce to be stored and shipped. Steamships made water transport faster and more reliable. Railways were a more economical form of transport than animal-drawn carts and wagons, although they were limited to tracks, and therefore could not support an advancing army unless its advance was along existing railway lines. At the same time, the advent of industrial warfare in the form of bolt-action rifles, machine guns and quick-firing artillery sent ammunition consumption soaring during the First World War.

In the twentieth century, the advent of motor vehicles powered by internal combustion engines offered an alternative to animal transport for moving supplies forward of the railhead, although many armies still used animals. Air transport provided an alternative to land and sea transport, but with limited tonnage and at high cost. An airlift over "the Hump" helped supply the Chinese war effort during the Second World War, and the 1948 Berlin Airlift was successful in supplying half of the city. With the subsequent development of large jets, aircraft became the preferred method of moving personnel over long distances, although it was still more economical to move cargo by sea and rail. In forward areas, the helicopter was well-suited to moving troops and supplies, especially over rugged terrain. The increasing complexity of weapons and equipment saw the proportion of personnel devoted to logistics rise. The diversity of equipment and consequent large number of spare parts saw attempts at standardisation but the adoption of foreign weapons also meant the adoption of foreign tactics, and giving up the advantages of bespoke systems tailored to a nation's own, often unique, strategic environment.

== Definition ==
Military logistics is

The science of planning and carrying out the movement and maintenance of forces. In its most comprehensive sense, the aspects of military operations which deal with: design and development, acquisition, storage, transport, distribution, maintenance, evacuation, and disposition of matériel; transport of personnel; acquisition, construction, maintenance, operation and disposition of facilities; acquisition or furnishing of services; and medical and health service support.

== Antiquity ==
The most basic requirements of an army are food and water. Neolithic armies were equipped with weapons used for hunting — spears, knives, axes and bows and arrows. By 1150 BCE the Olmecs of Mesoamerica were producing obsidian weapons that were neither hunting weapons nor agricultural tools. Early armies were small due to the practical difficulty of supplying large numbers of people, and their radius of action was likewise limited to 80 to 90 kilometres or so. A ruler or warlord might use an army to extract tax or tribute, but it required a formidable logistical exercise to employ it. By 700 BCE, Assyria had developed a standing army, with iron replacing bronze in weapons and armour, and cavalry replacing chariots. The Assyrian army may have been able to field as many as 50,000 men, which alone would have required a high degree of logistical acumen, but could operate up to 500 kilometres from its bases. The price of logistical failure could be severe. In 600 CE, the Chinese general Zheng Rentai led a force of 14,000 cavalry through a desert region after consuming all their food supplies, and the troops were forced to eat their horses and then each other. Only 800 men survived the ordeal.

Re-enactment of Roman legionary with sarcina marching pack
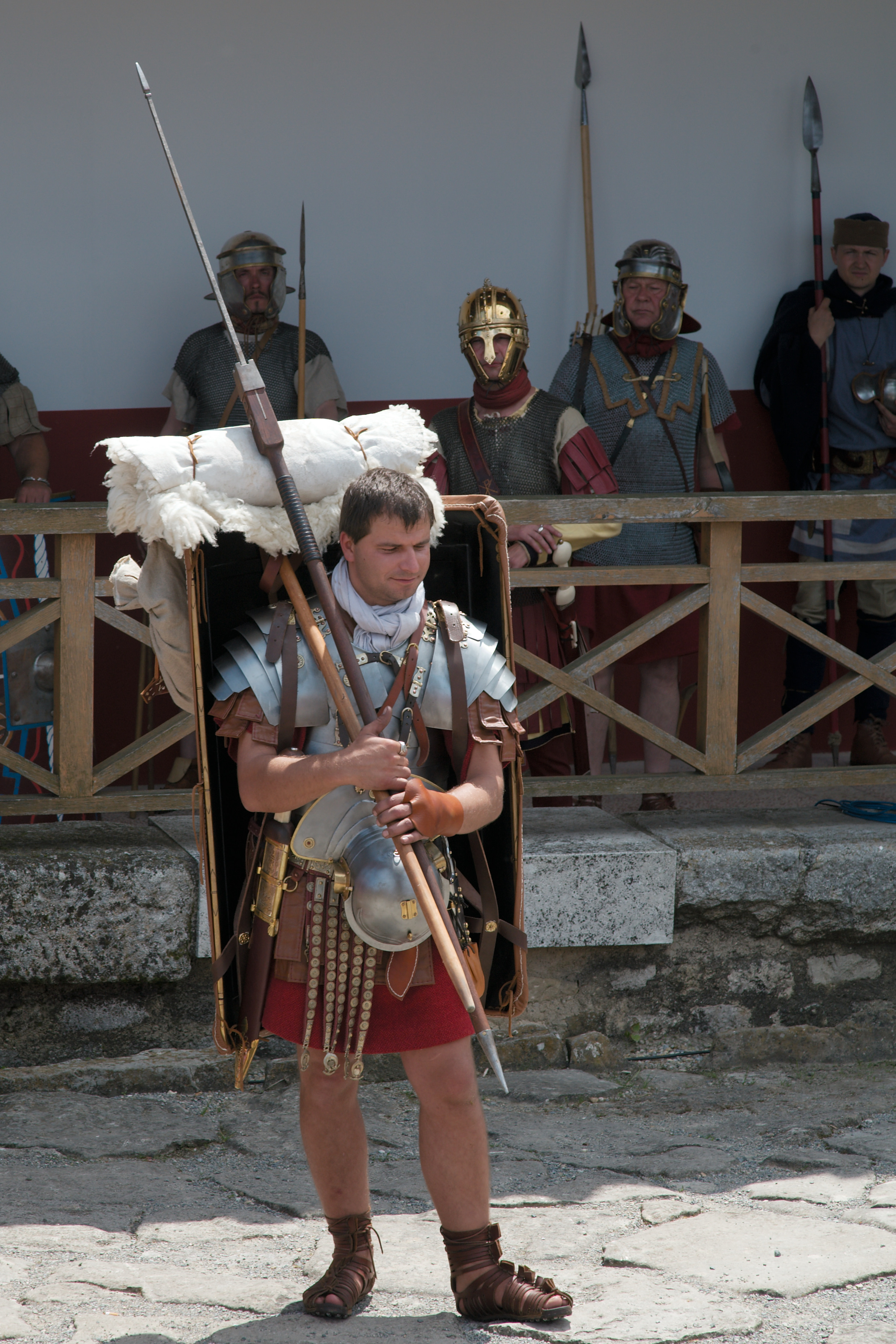
Front view

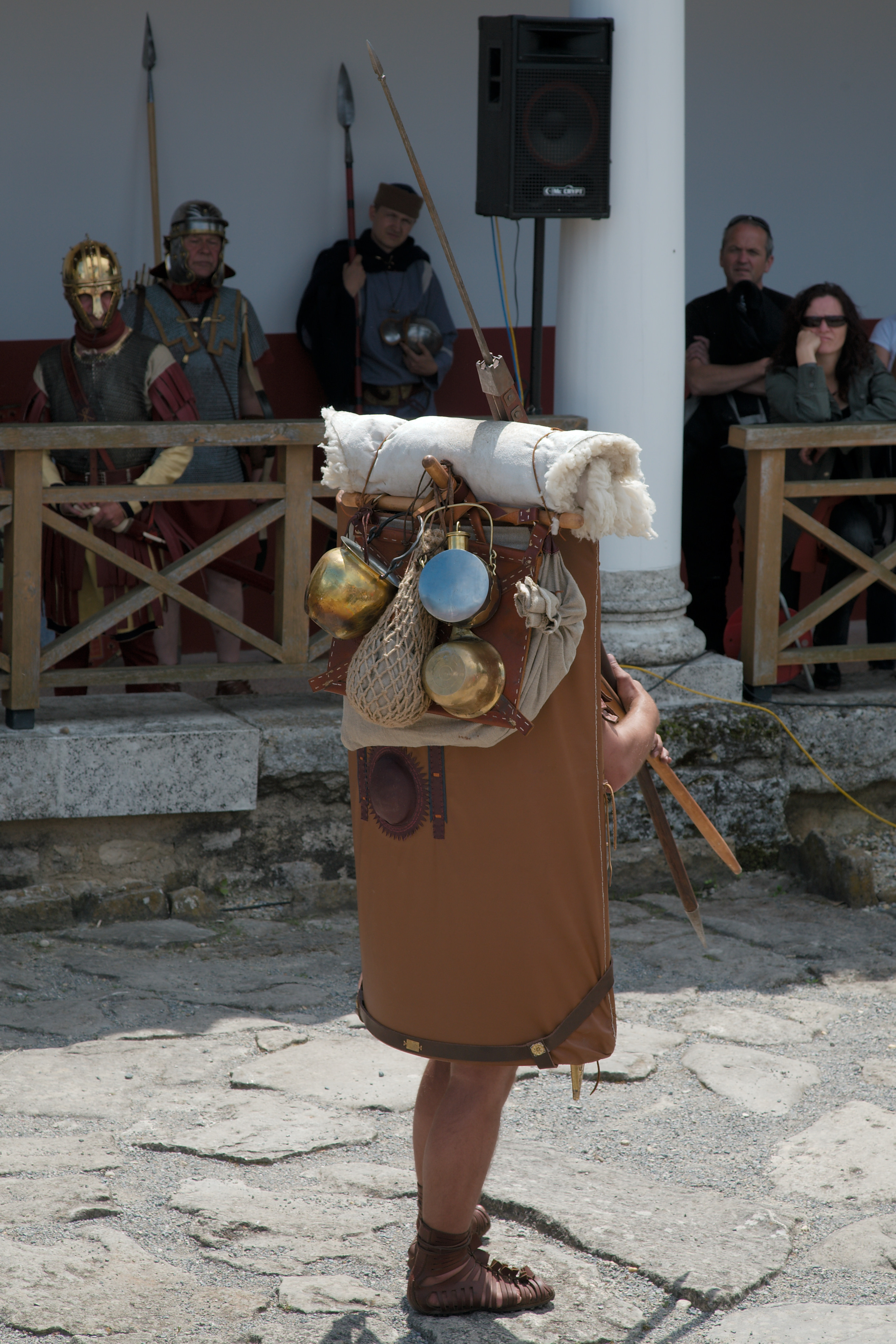
Side view

Alexander the Great's father, Philip II of Macedon banned the use of carts on the grounds that they restricted the army's speed and mobility. Alexander continued this practice, with his army relying on horses and mules. He also used camels, many of which were captured along with Darius III's baggage train after the Battle of Issus. Although a cart drawn by a pair of oxen could carry up to 540 kilograms (1,200 lb), compared with about 110 kilograms (250 lb) for pack horses, mules and camels, they could only travel at 3.2 kilometres per hour (2 mph) and be worked for five hours per day, whereas pack horses could travel at 6.4 kilometres per hour (4 mph) and be worked for eight hours per day. Carts were also liable to break down, especially in rough country. Some were necessary, however, for the carriage of heavy siege machinery.

The defences and fortifications of cities improved to the point where siege warfare became a complicated technological task, involving scaling ladders, battering rams, siege towers and tunnelling, and could take months. Supply of a besieging force required the transport or construction of special equipment as well as the provision of food and water. Siege warfare in the Hellenistic period used torsion artillery, which required special ropes. Women's hair was considered the best material for this. For one campaign, Rhodes collected 680 kg of hair. In a single night during the Siege of Rhodes in 305 BCE, 2,300 missiles were fired from torsion artillery.

In the imperial Roman army, each eight-man contubernium (squad) had a mule to carry the leather or goatskin tent large enough to accommodate the squad and tools, cooking implements and a handmill to grind grain, as that part of the ration was issued unground. Together with five days' rations, this weighed about 200 kilograms (440 lb), which was easily within the carrying capacity of eight men and a mule. Adding a second mule would allow the contubernium to carry an additional 11 to 13 days' rations. The Roman army ration included bread or biscuit, beef and veal, pork and sucking-pig, mutton and lamb, poultry, lentils, cheese, olive oil, wine or vinegar, and salt. This gave them about 3,400 calories (14,000 kJ) per day, which was similar to that of Alexander's men. An army of 60,000 required 95,000 litres (21,000 imp gal) of water for the men and 720,000 litres (158,000 imp gal) for the animals each day. Each contubernium had their own fire to cook their meals, so firewood had to be collected; Julius Caesar regarded a shortage of firewood to be as dangerous as one of water or fodder. The Olmecs used comales to prepare tortillas that could be retoasted and consumed en route, whereas the Maya lacked a good, transportable food, which made long-distance forays difficult.

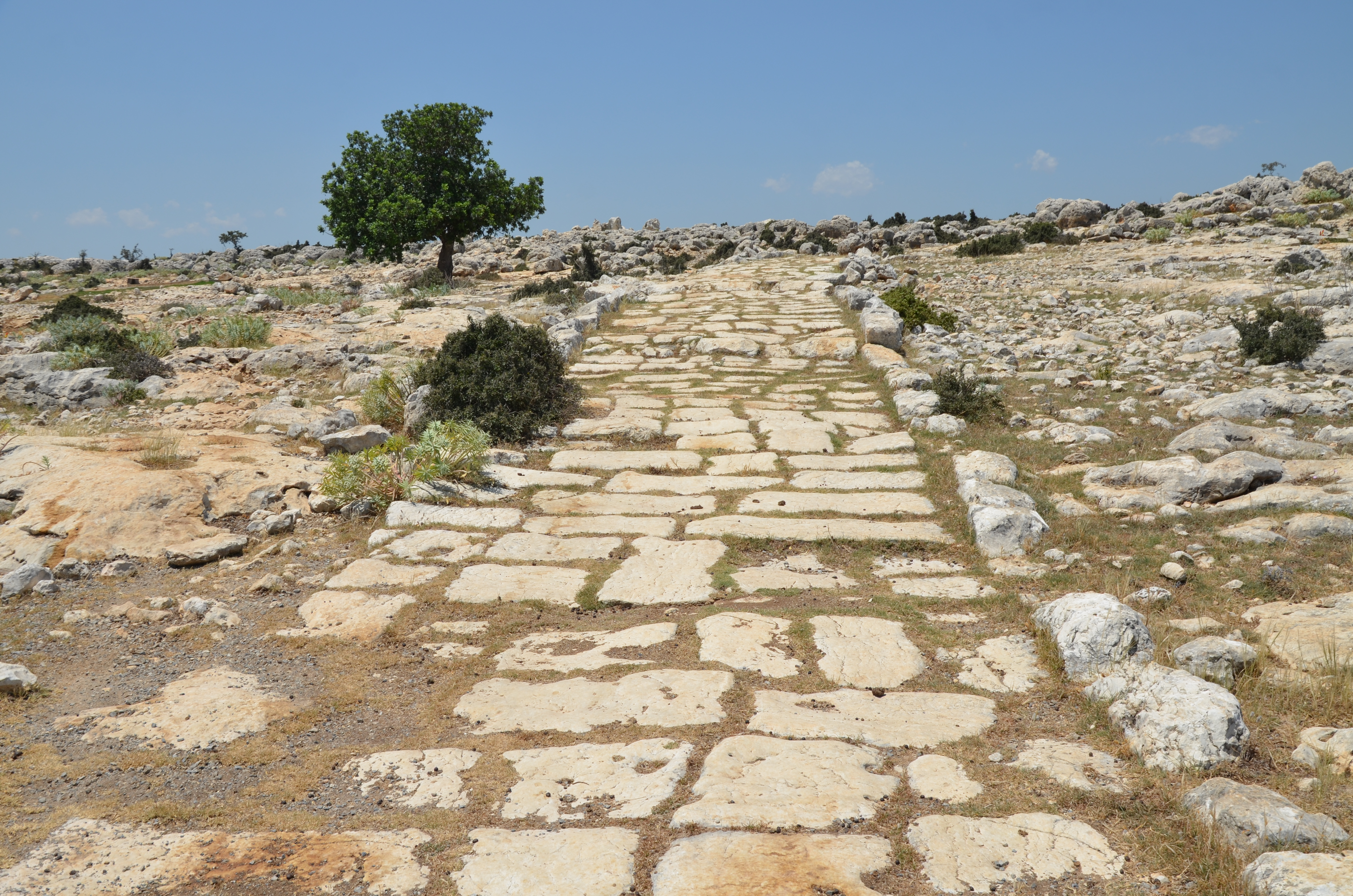
Ancient road in Tarsus, Turkey

The Romans constructed a network of roads to permit the rapid movement of wheeled vehicles. A road network was in existence in Italy as early as the third century BCE, and by the time of Diocletian the Roman Empire had 90,000 kilometres (56,000 mi) of roads. The Roman army had no specialised engineering units, and roads were normally built by local communities, but the army could and did construct roads, especially near the frontiers. Roads were not necessary for the movement of troops, since the soldiers and their pack animals could travel along unimproved dirt tracks, but roads were used by supply trains and a military mail system. The Chinese also built a road network, as did the Maurya Empire in India, the Persians in Asia Minor, and the Moche in South America.

However, it was less expensive to ship a tonne of grain from Egypt to Rome by sea than to move it 80 kilometres (50 mi) by road. The Romans preferred to use sea travel when they could, but it was risky as ships could be lost in storms. In his treatise on The Art of Commanding Armies, Polybius recommended that a commander have a thorough knowledge of how far ships could travel by day and night, and the optimal time and seasons for sea travel. Six months' supply of grain for an army of 40,000 would have weighed 6,320 tonnes, and could have been carried in 200 ships. In the second Persian invasion of Greece, Xerxes I was able to move a massive army by sea and provision it through depots stocked with food, water, and fodder. Alexander was supported by a fleet that supplied his army, but his crossing of the Gedrosian desert nearly came to grief because his fleet carrying food and water was delayed by onset of the southwest monsoon.

== Middle Ages ==
One of the most significant changes in military organisation in Europe after the fall of the Roman Empire in the fifth century was the shift from a centrally organised army to a combination of military forces made up of local troops who often worked within the household during peace time and were provided food and drink from the high officials in the house. The magnates drew upon their own resources for their men, and during Charlemagne's reign and the reign of the Ottonian dynasty in Germany, some heads of house built permanent storages and dwellings to house men or supplies. Feudalism, under which a warrior nobility owed military obligations to their overlords, was a form of distributed military logistics system made necessary by poor communications and inadequate monetisation. In Anglo-Saxon England, King Ine of Wessex established a form of tax in kind known as the feorm, which allowed troops to be supported without cash purchases.

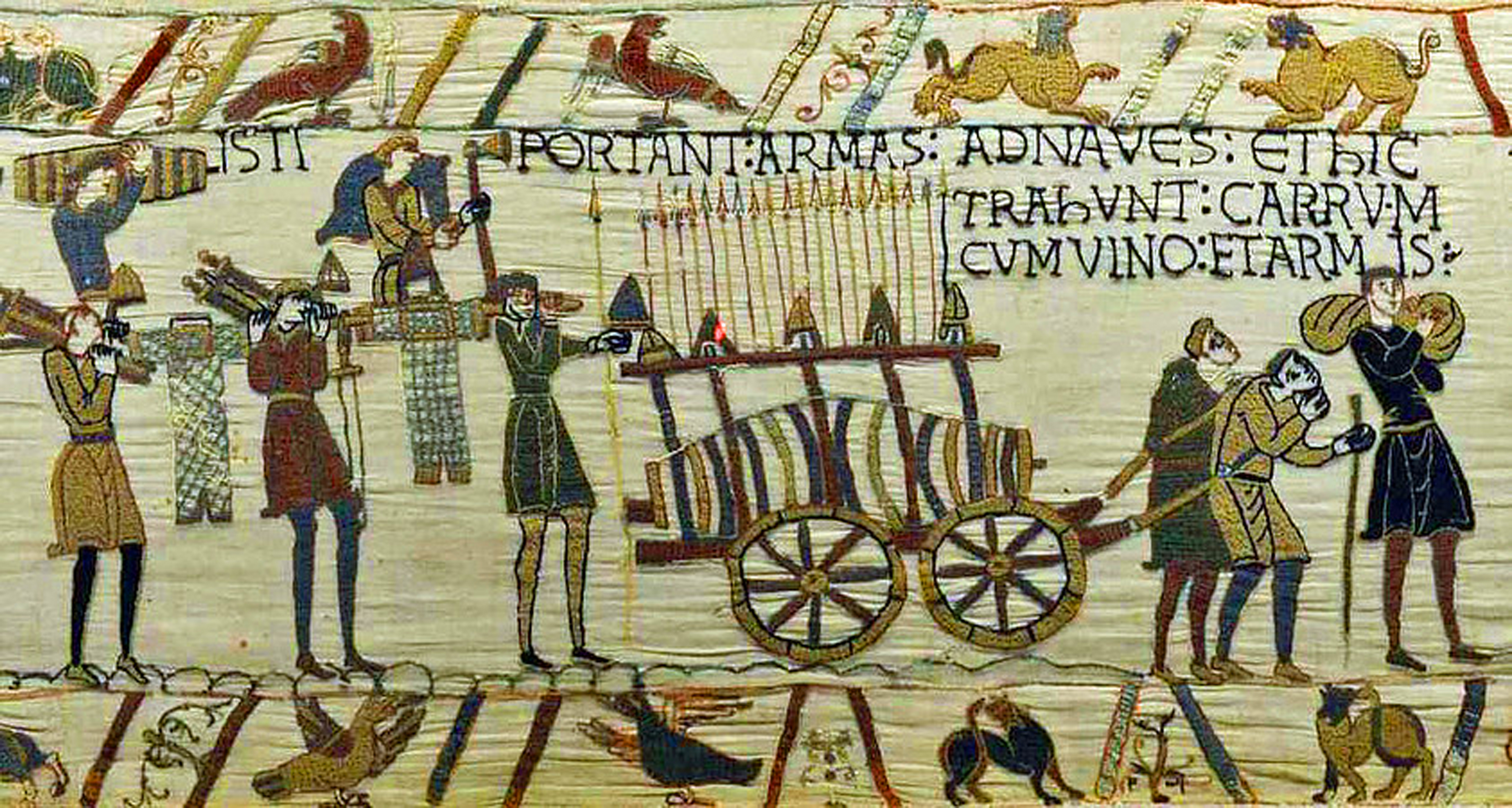
Military supply transport of arms and wine for the Norman Invasion of England in 1066, from the Bayeux Tapestry

While on campaign, soldiers in the medieval period (the fifth to fifteenth centuries) in Europe were often responsible for supplying themselves, either through foraging, looting (more common during sieges), or purchases from markets along the campaign route. Even so, military commanders often provided their troops with food and supplies. This might be in lieu of wages if they worked within the king's household, but soldiers would be expected to pay for it from their wages if they did not, at cost or even with a profit.

Some early governments, such as the Carolingians in eighth century, required soldiers to supply their own food for three months, but would feed soldiers thereafter for free if the campaign or siege was ongoing. Later, during the Saxon revolt of 1077–1088, Saxon soldiers were required to bring supplies enough for the entire campaign. Some individual feats of logistics were formidable; after a seven-week campaign English archers shot up to half a million arrows during the battle of Crécy in 1346.

Soldiers were often required to come equipped for campaign with their own armour, shields and weapons. They could often obtain the needed supplies from local craftsmen: smiths, carpenters, and leather workers often supplied the local militia troops with cooking utensils, bows and arrows, and horseshoes and saddles. Archaeologists have found evidence of goods production in excavations of royal houses, suggesting that the Roman infrastructure of central arms and equipment factories was inherited, even if such factories were more decentralised. Estates during Charlemagne's reign were required to have carpenters staffed to produce weapons and armour.

The Vikings focused on seizing sites such as monasteries that had large stores of supplies such as grain, cheese, livestock, beer and wine. These were often located in agricultural areas with large surpluses stored in warehouses and granaries. This simplified pillaging and foraging. They were also filled with valuable objects and housed wealthy persons who could be ransomed for substantial sums. However, they still had to take some supplies with them, and their longships were not suited to this, so they also brought merchant ships (knerrir) to carry supplies with them (and to take plunder back). They established bases where supplies could be stored, which allowed them to occasionally field substantial forces and carry out large-scale operations, such as in the Siege of Paris in 885–886.

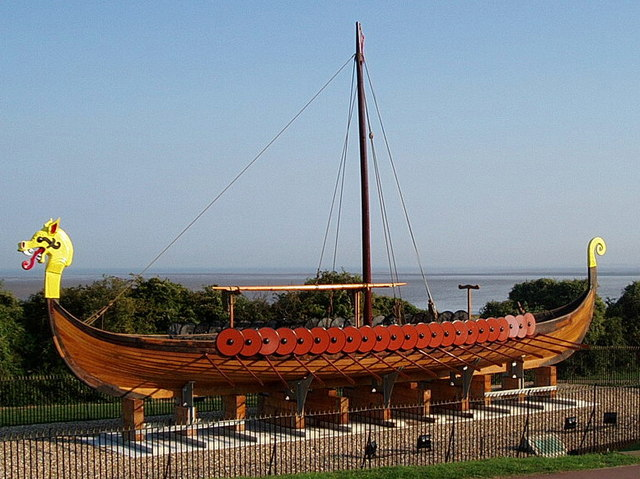
Replica of a Viking longboat

The Mongols drank horses' blood and milk, and took with them other livestock such as sheep, goats, cattle and sometimes camels. Sheep were the most important of the herd animals, and butter and cheese were produced from their milk, although horse meat was a particular favourite. Livestock could be spared for slaughter only occasionally, but when it was, all parts of the animal were eaten, and the bones were saved to make broth. They supplemented their diet with wild game, and collected various wild vegetables, fruits, berries, fungi and edible seeds. They had collapsible tents that could be quickly erected and struck. They were capable of operating in winter, but depended on their horses, so they needed grasslands where the horses could graze.

Beasts of burden were used as vehicular transport for the food and supplies, either by carrying the supplies directly on their backs—the average medieval horse and mule could carry roughly 100 kilograms—or by pulling carts or wagons, depending on the weather conditions. A force with 1,000 pack and draft animals required roughly 9,000 kilograms of food for the animals, of which 4,000 kilograms was grain. Other animals had similar needs; donkeys each required about five kilograms of food each day, of which one kilogram had to be grain, while camels required approximately twelve kilograms of food each day, of which five kilograms needed to be grain. Horses were not usually used as draft animals in China or India. In India, oxen were used to carry supplies purchased from the banjaras, mobile merchants who often accompanied armies. Oxen required no grain, but needed 20 kilograms of fodder per day, which could be found by grazing, should time and conditions permit. In the Middle East and Central Asia, camels were often used, and in South and South East Asia elephants were used where roads and navigable rivers were uncommon, but there was plentiful water and foliage. This was more difficult in sub-Saharan Africa, where the elephants were less amenable. A herd of 1,000 cattle could feed approximately 14,000 men for roughly ten days.

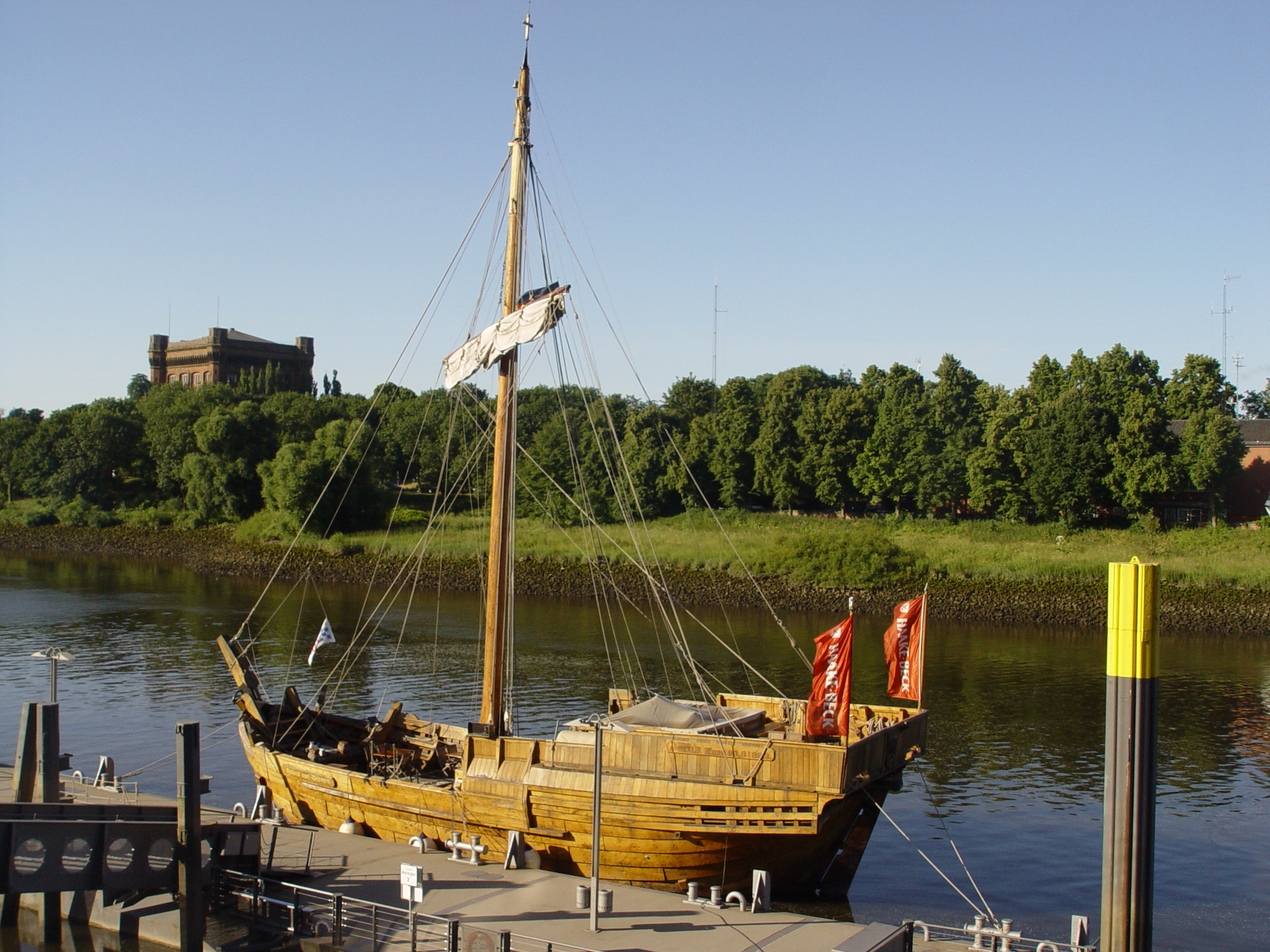
Replica of a medieval cog

Commanders also made use of water transport throughout the medieval period as it was more efficient than ground transport. Ships made transporting supplies, and often soldiers, easier and more reliable, but the ability to use water transport was limited by location, weather, and the availability of ships. Cargo ships were also used, and were most commonly of the Nordic-type, the Utrecht-type, or the proto-cog craft. River boats resembling simple log-boats were also used. In Sub-Saharan Africa, where there were many lakes, canoes were used. Supply by sea was more economical, but not necessarily simpler than supply by land, due to complicating factors like loading and unloading, stowage, and moving supplies to an army that may not be on the coast.

In Mesoamerica, there were no wheeled vehicles or draft animals that could be used as beasts of burden. The army of the Aztec Empire consisted of units of 8,000 men called xiquipilli. The army was accompanied by porters who carried about 23 kilograms each. It moved slowly, at about 2.4 kilometres per hour or 19 kilometres per day. Since the Aztecs did not build roads outside the major cities, the army moved along tracks used for local trade. Due to the limitations of the tracks, each xiquipilli departed on a different day, and used a different route if possible. Since the army could carry food for no more than eight days, this gave it a combat radius of about 58 kilometres (36 mi) in hostile territory; moving through its own territory the army drew on supplies from tributary towns along the way.

== Early modern ==
=== Sixteenth century ===
Between 1530 and 1710, the size of the armed forces deployed by European states increased by an order of magnitude, to 100,000 or more in some cases, resulting in a corresponding increase in the numbers involved in major battles. There were technical and tactical components to this, like the shift from expensive armoured knights to cheaper pikemen, who could be mobilised in vast numbers, but the major factor was the growth of the European state. Increases in population and wealth generated more revenue through taxation, which could be utilised more effectively due to a series of administrative reforms in the sixteenth century. States now had the means to fund the upkeep and development of roads, which aided the logistical support of forces.

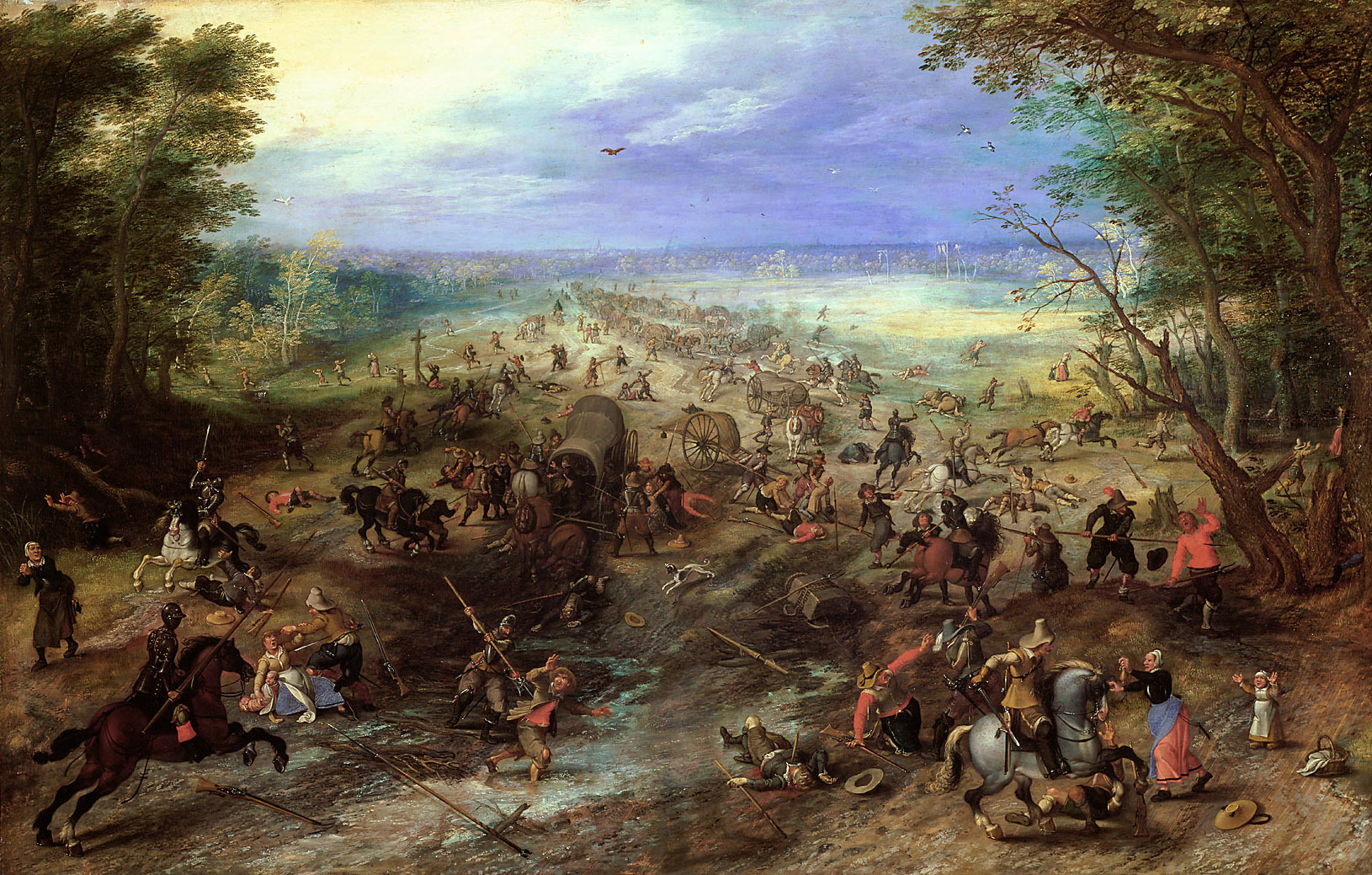
Assault on a 17th-century convoy

This increase in size came not just in the number of actual soldiers but also camp followers, or tross, — anywhere from half to one and a half times the size of the army itself — and the size of the baggage train — averaging one wagon for every fifteen men. However, little state support was provided to these massive armies, the vast majority of which consisted of mercenaries. Beyond being paid for their service by the state (an act which bankrupted even the Spanish Empire on several occasions), these soldiers and their commanders were forced to provide everything for themselves. If permanently assigned to a town or city with a working marketplace, or travelling along a well-established military route, supplies could be bought locally with intendants overseeing the exchanges. In other cases an army travelling in friendly territory could expect to be followed by sutlers, whose stocks were small and subject to price gouging, or a commissioner could be sent ahead to a town to make arrangements, including billetting if necessary.

Many armies were further restricted to following waterways as supplies they were forced to carry could be more easily transported by water. The Russians made use of the Volga River to support the conquest of Kazan in the Russo-Kazan Wars. Artillery in particular was reliant on this method of transport, since even a modest number of cannons of the period required hundreds of horses to move them and their ammunition, and they travelled at half the speed of the rest of the army. Troops moving down the Spanish Road between 1567 and 1620 were able to travel from Milan and Brussels, a distance of about 1,100 kilometres (700 mi), in five to seven weeks. If an army marched at a leisurely pace of 10 to 13 kilometres (6 to 8 mi) per day, the heavy guns could keep up with little difficulty. Improvements in metal casting techniques and the use of copper-based alloys like bronze and brass made cannons lighter and more durable, and therefore more mobile, but their production and maintenance required skilled craftsmen.

The Ottoman Empire developed a formidable logistical system. The network of Roman and Byzantine roads radiating from Constantinople provided good lines of communication, as did the Danube River, via the Black Sea and the port of Varna. Ottoman troops could march 970 kilometres (600 mi) from Constantinople to Buda via Adrianople and Belgrade in six weeks, drawing provision en route from forty depots. They were fed biscuit, which did not require grinding like grain, and was less likely to spoil in wet weather than flour. This was supplemented by regular issues of mutton. During the siege of Vienna in 1529, heavy rains caused flooding and rendered the roads impassable to the Turks' heavy cannons, and in the Long Turkish War of 1593 to 1606 the Turkish forces in Transylvania were hampered by attacks on their supply ships on the Danube and Tisza Rivers.

=== Seventeenth century ===
By the mid-seventeenth century, the French under Secretary of State for War Michel Le Tellier began a series of military reforms to address some of the issues which had plagued armies. Besides ensuring that soldiers were more regularly paid and combating the corruption and inefficiencies of private contractors, he devised formulae to calculate the supplies required for a given campaign, created standardised contracts for dealing with commercial suppliers, and formed a permanent vehicle-park manned by specialists whose role was to carry a few days' supplies while accompanying the army during campaigns. With these arrangements there was a gradual increase in the use of magazines, which provided a more regular flow of supply via convoys. While the concepts of magazines and convoys was not new, prior to the increase in army sizes there had rarely been cause to implement them.

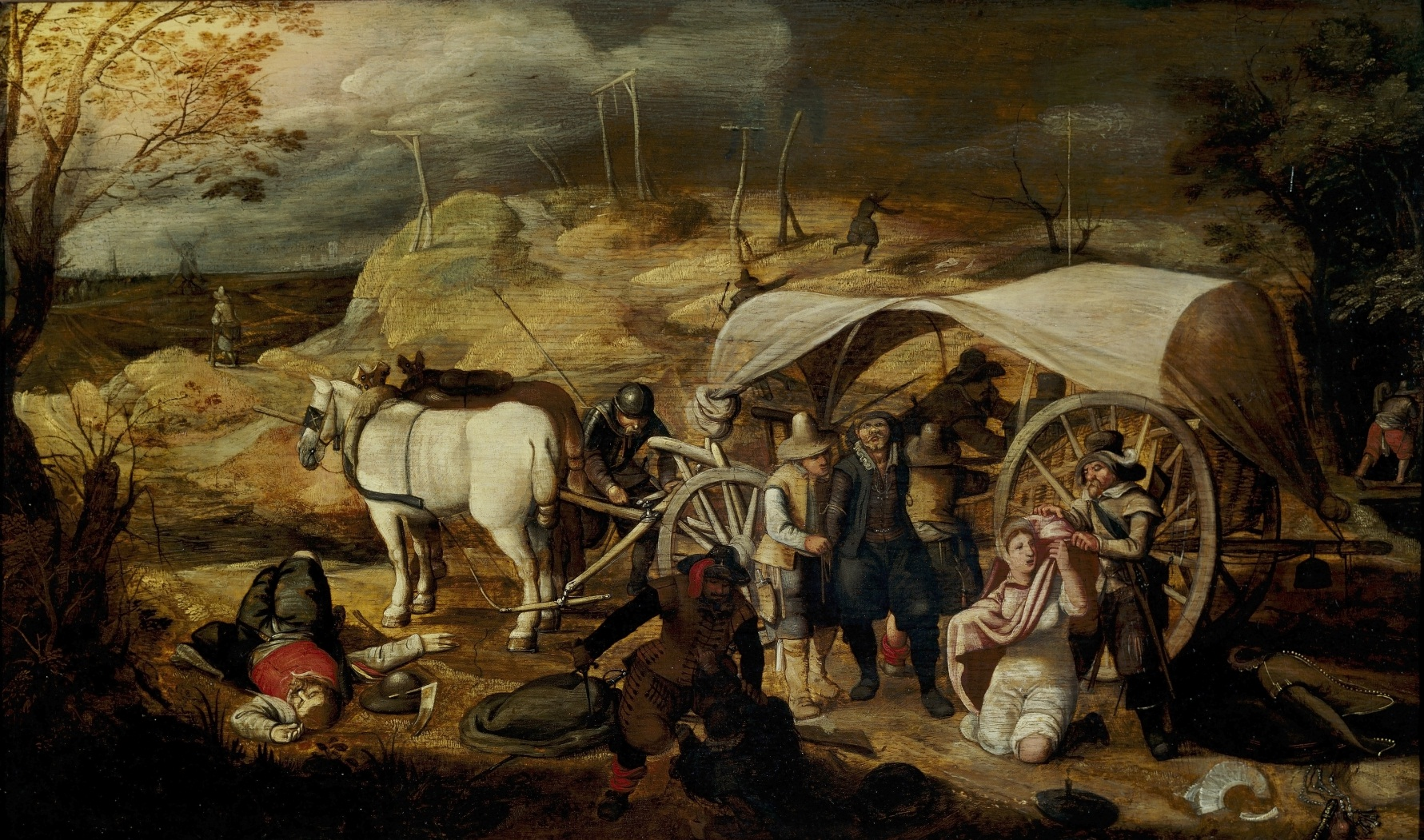
Painting of marauding 17th-century soldiers, depicting people and the landscape being devastated by military campaigns

Le Tellier's son, Louvois, continued the reforms after assuming his position. The most important of these reforms was to guarantee free daily rations for the soldiers, amounting to two pounds of bread or hardtack a day. These rations were supplemented as circumstances allowed by a source of protein such as meat or beans; soldiers were still responsible for purchasing these items out-of-pocket but they were often available at below-market prices or even free at the expense of the state. Louvois also made permanent a system of magazines that were overseen by local governors to ensure they were fully stocked. Some of these magazines were dedicated to providing frontier towns and fortresses several months' worth of supplies in the event of a siege, while the rest were supported French armies operating in the field.

When operating in enemy territory an army was forced to plunder the local countryside for supplies, a historical tradition meant to allow war to be conducted at the enemy's expense. However, with the increase in army sizes this reliance on plunder became a major problem, as decisions regarding where and when an army could move or fight were made based not on strategic objectives but whether a given area was capable of supporting the soldiers' needs. Sieges in particular were affected by this, both for an army attempting to lay siege to a location and for one coming to its relief. Unless a commander was able to implement a regular resupply, a fortress or town with a devastated countryside could be effectively immune to either operation. Mons could not be besieged in 1684 because of a lack of forage in the area. For the later French siege of Mons in the Spanish Netherlands in 1691, during the Nine Years' War, Louvois purchased 900,000 rations of fodder the year before.

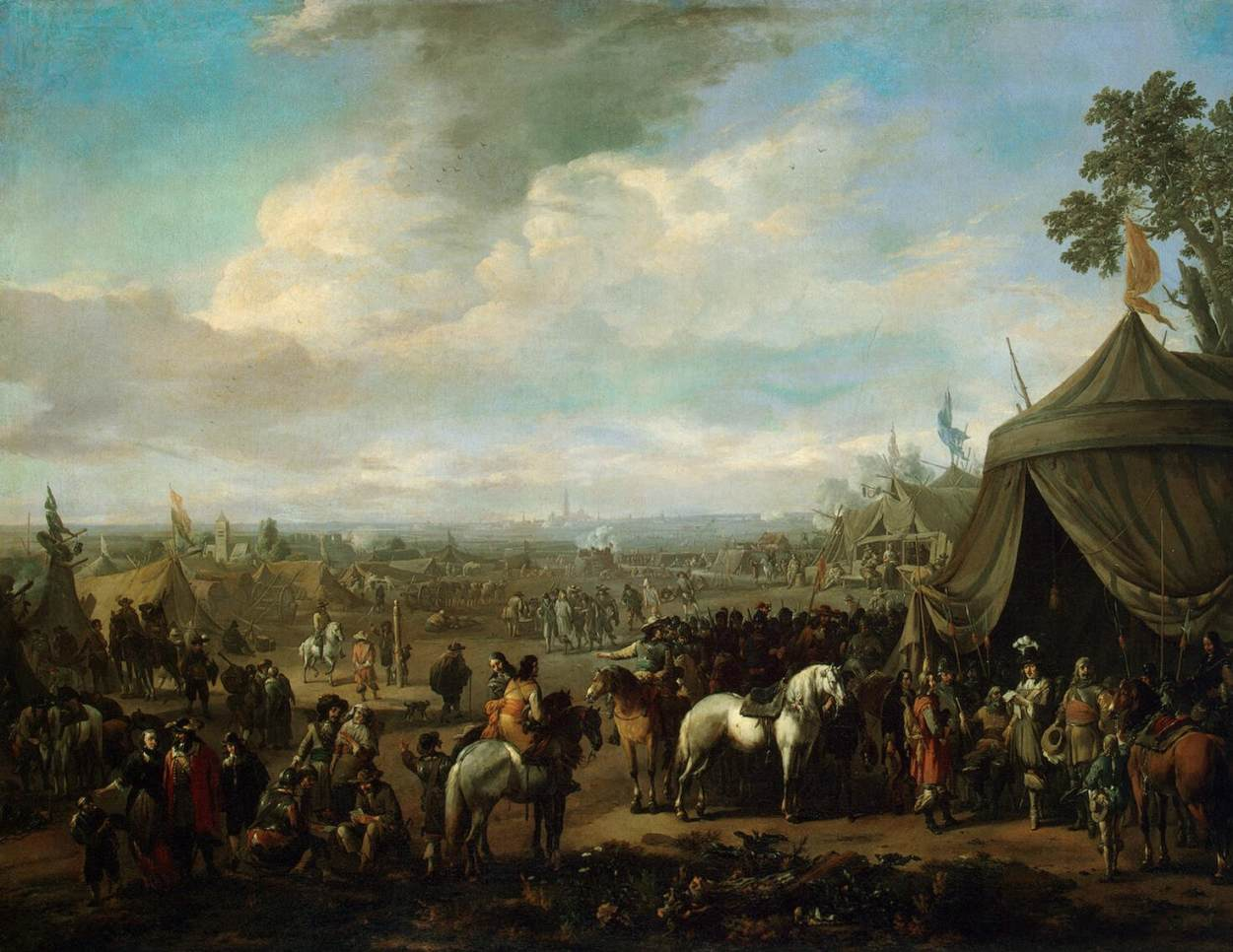
A Flemish town is besieged by Spanish soldiers.

Although living off the land theoretically granted armies freedom of movement, it required careful planning, and the need for plunder precluded any sort of sustained, purposeful advance. Bread was a particular problem, as providing it locally was limited by the availability of mills, ovens and bakers. An army of 60,000 might require 90,000 rations once camp followers were included, and at 0.68 kilograms (1.5 lb) of bread per ration that would require 61 tonnes (135,000 lb) of bread per day. Armies normally marched for three days and rested on the fourth. A supply of bread for 60,000 men for four days required at least sixty ovens operated by 240 bakers. To build an oven required 500 two-kilogram bricks, so sixty ovens required sixty cartloads of bricks. In addition, a month's supply of fuel for the sixty ovens needed 1,400 cartloads. Local mills were targets for enemy action, so handmills were often necessary.

Recourse therefore had to be made to bringing up supplies from the bases. Fortresses not only guarded lines of communication they served as supply bases. In 1675, a French army 80,000 strong was supported for two months by the grain stored at Maastricht and Liège. The indecisiveness of campaigns of the period was largely the result of the difficulty involved in supplying large armies. The larger armies of the seventeenth century also saw the advent of military uniforms, which were introduced in Britain with the New Model Army in the English Civil War. Clothing contracts became centralised but funds were disbursed through regiments, which developed distinctive dress. Government payments were often in arrears, sometimes by years, and stripping the dead for their clothing became a common practice.

=== Eighteenth century ===
In 1704, the Duke of Marlborough marched his army from the Netherlands to the Danube, following the Rhine and Neckar rivers. He was able to do so because he was moving through rich country and his Quartermaster General, Colonel William Cadogan, paid for supplies in gold at fair prices, so that the local population were willing to sell, and brought supplies to collection points. This was arranged through a contract let to Sir Solomon de Medina to purchase supplies through local agents. The 400-kilometre (250 mi) march wore out boots but these too were provided. The result was that the army arrived in good condition and ready to fight the Battle of Blenheim.

In contrast, Marlborough's opponent, Marshal Tallard, was placed at a logistical disadvantage, having to advance without prepositioned supplies. Usually a population regarded the presence of an army, whether friendly or not, as a disaster and hoped that it would go away as soon as possible. Europe lacked a network of good roads, and rains or snow melt could turn unmade roads into quagmires. Bridges were infrequent, and wooden bridges were easy to destroy. Most were crossed only by ferry. Rivers could become unnavigable if the water level rose or fell too much.

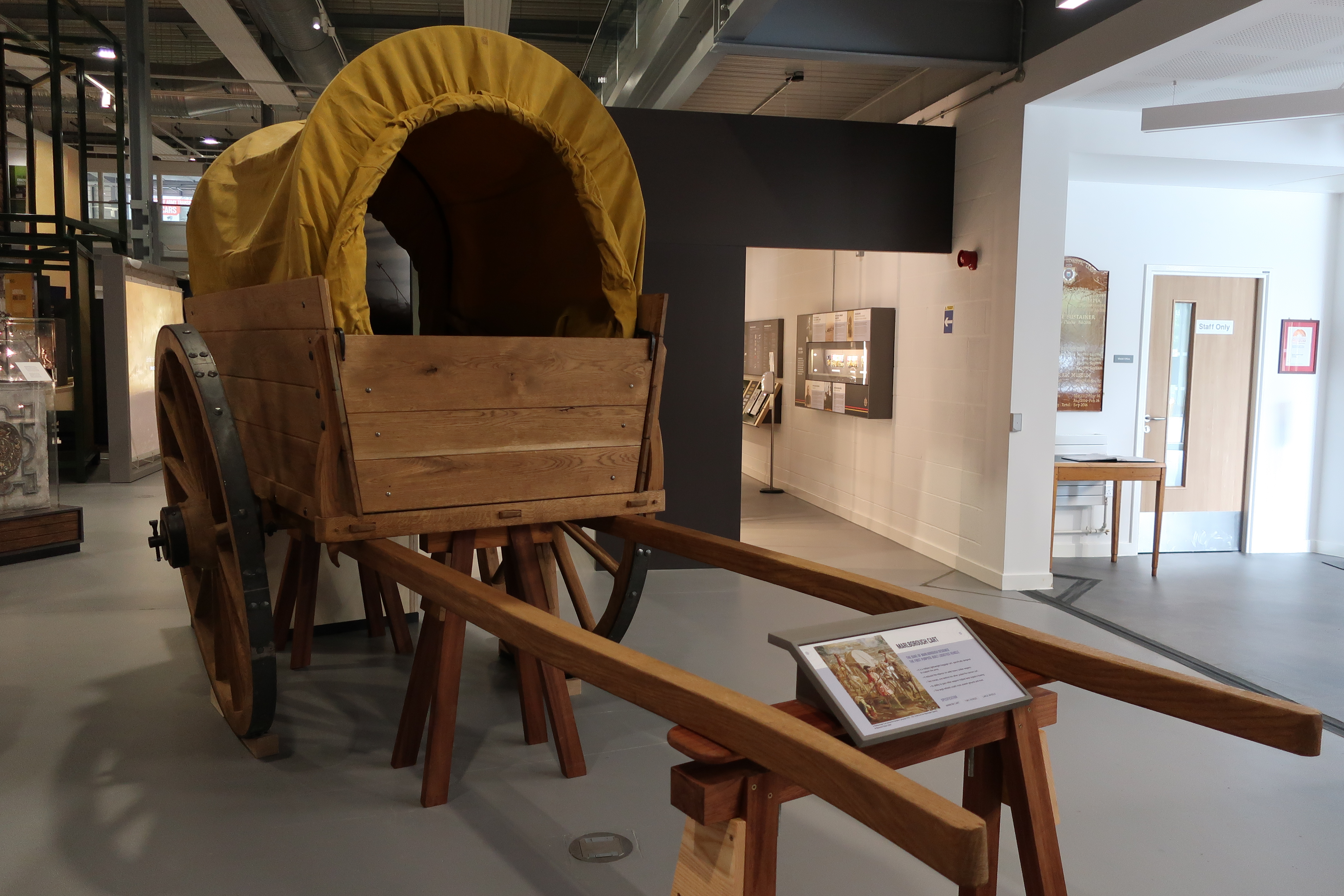
Reconstruction of a lightweight cart that was designed to support the Duke of Marlborough's army. Pulled by two horses in tandem, it was narrow enough to easily pass other wagons and maneuvre through gaps. The large wheels enabled it to cross uneven or soft ground.

The Chinese likewise were able to tap into the rich agricultural resources of eastern China to support campaigns against far-flung adversaries. The Kangxi Emperor drove the Russians from the Amur river region, and besieged the Russian fortress at Albazin. The Treaty of Nerchinsk allocated the region to China. In the Dzungar–Qing Wars, the emperor was able to mount an expedition across the Gobi Desert to defeat the Dzungar in the Battle of Jao Modo, but subsequent expeditions to Tibet in 1717 and 1718 were frustrated by logistical difficulties and ran out of food before a more successful expedition in 1720.

In the American Revolutionary War, the Americans had a young population with large numbers of potential soldiers, and an agricultural economy with surplus foodstuffs and no vital centres. Clothing and footwear could be supplied by domestic production, there was widespread ownership of firearms, and a shipping industry experienced in smuggling that could supply other needs. What they lacked was land transportation infrastructure — roads, waterways, wagons, animals and skilled personnel — needed for the distribution of supplies. This hampered the creation and maintenance of forces sufficiently large to drive out the British.

After the war the British created the infrastructure and gained the experience needed to manage an empire. They reorganised the management of the supply of military food and transport, which was completed in 1793–1794 when the naval Victualling and Transport Boards undertook those responsibilities. It built upon experience learned from the supply of the very-long-distance Falkland Islands garrison from 1767 to 1772 to systematise needed shipments to distant places such as Australia, Nova Scotia, and Sierra Leone.

This new infrastructure allowed Britain to launch large expeditions to the continent during the Revolutionary and Napoleonic Wars and to develop a global network of garrisons in the colonies. They were not always successful; British setbacks in the Kandyan Wars in Sri Lanka were partly attributable to logistical difficulties, although disease and terrain were also factors, and the British were defeated by the Ashanti Empire in the Battle of Nsamankow in 1824 when they ran out of ammunition.

== Nineteenth century ==
=== Napoleonic wars ===
Napoleon made logistical operations a major part of French strategy. He dispersed his corps along a broad front to maximise the area from which supplies could be drawn. Each day forage parties brought in supplies. This differed from earlier operations living off the land in the size of the forces involved, and because the primary motivation was the emperor's desire for mobility. Crucially, the army did not degenerate into an armed mob. Ammunition could not as a rule be obtained locally, so Napoleon allotted 2,500 of his 4,500 wagons to carrying artillery ammunition, with the rest hauling rations. Each man carried 60 to 80 rounds in his pack, and each division carried 97,000 rounds in reserve. Thus, like earlier armies, the Grande Armée took with it sufficient ammunition for the whole campaign. Support troops accompanied each unit. A British Royal Horse Artillery troop in 1813 was authorised to have a farrier, a carriage smith, two shoeing smiths, two collar makers and a wheelwright.

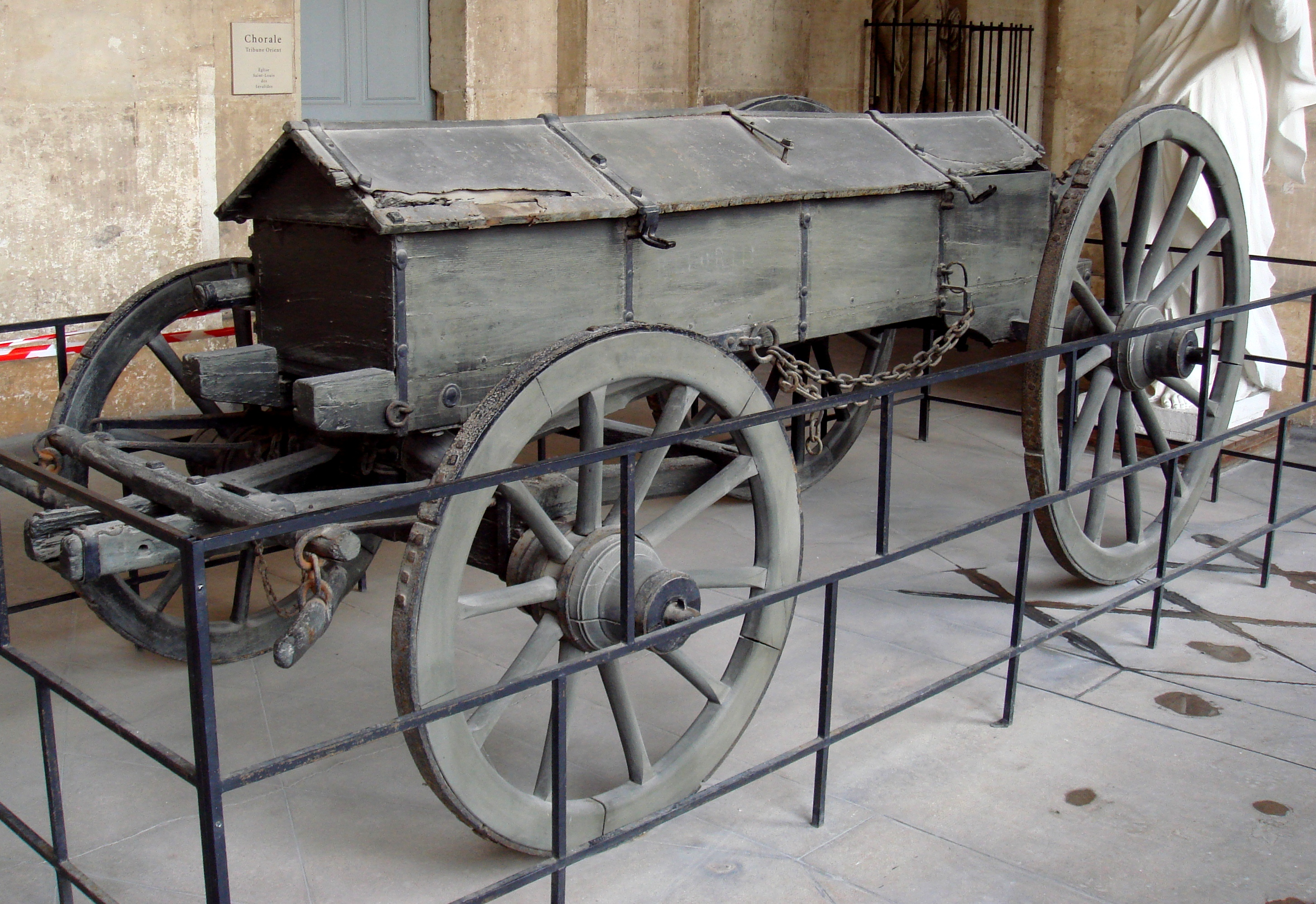
Napoleonic artillery ammunition cart

During the Ulm Campaign in 1805, the French army of 200,000 men had no need for time-consuming efforts to scour the countryside for supplies and live off the land, as it was well provided for by France's German allies. France's ally, the Electorate of Bavaria, turned the city of Augsburg into a gigantic supply centre, allowing the Grande Armée, generously replenished with food, shoes and ammunition, to quickly invade Austria after the decisive French victory at Ulm.

Napoleon left nothing to chance, requesting the Bavarians to prepare in advance a specified amount of food at certain cities such as Würzburg and Ulm, for which the French reimbursed them. When French demands proved excessive for the German principalities, the French army used a system of vouchers to requisition supplies and keep the rapid advance going. The agreements with allies permitted the French to obtain huge quantities of supplies within a few days' notice. Napoleon built up a major supply magazine at Passau, with barges transporting supplies down the Danube to Vienna to maintain the French army prior to the Battle of Austerlitz in combat readiness.

The French system fared poorly in the Peninsular War in the face of Spanish guerrilla warfare that targeted their supply lines and the British blockade of French-occupied ports on the Iberian Peninsula. The need to supply a besieged Barcelona made it impossible to control the province and ended French plans to incorporate Catalonia into Napoleon's Empire. Wellington blocked the French advance into Portugal with a series of fortifications, the Lines of Torres Vedras, and devastated the area north of the lines to make it difficult for the French to mass forces there to assault or besiege the fortifications.

A more spectacular logistical failure occurred in the Russian campaign in 1812. Carl von Clausewitz noted:

The second crisis most commonly occurs at the end of a victorious campaign when the lines of communication have begun to be overstretched. This is especially true when the war is conducted in an impoverished, thinly populated and possibly hostile country. How vast a difference there is between a supply line stretching from Vilna to Moscow, where every wagon has to be procured by force, and a line from Cologne to Paris, via Liége, Louvain, Brussels, Mons, Valenciennes and Cambrai, where a commercial transaction, a bill of exchange, is enough to produce millions of rations!

=== Medical logistics ===
Disease had been the greatest enemy of the soldier. Invading armies sometimes introduced diseases. Wars often created conditions for diseases to flourish through crowding, social disruption and damage to infrastructure. Crowded army camps were always susceptible to diseases. In the eighteenth century, physicians like George Cleghorn, Richard Brocklesby and René-Nicolas Dufriche Desgenettes called for improvements in military hygiene, as did John Pringle, who wrote a treatise on military medicine in 1752, Observations on the Diseases of the Army in Camp and Garrison, in which he argued that disease was caused by bad air and overcrowding.

James Lind published a Treatise of the Scurvy in 1753 in which he advocated the consumption of fresh fruit and lemon juice to treat scurvy, a common illness among sailors on long voyages. Of the 175,990 sailors recruited by the Royal Navy between 1774 and 1780, 18,545 died of disease, mainly scurvy, and 1,243 were killed. Between 1794 and 1813, with the adoption of a lemon juice ration, the navy's sick rate fell from 1 in 4 to 1 in 10.75 and the death rate from 1 in 86 to 1 in 143. Lind also advocated the consumption of the bark of cinchona trees to prevent malaria, something that had previously been recommended by Thomas Sydenham in 1676. The active ingredient was extracted and isolated in 1820 by Pierre-Joseph Pelletier and Joseph Bienaimé Caventou, who named it "quinine".

=== Later nineteenth century ===
The nineteenth century saw technological developments that facilitated immense improvements to the storage, handling and transportation of supplies. Salting, drying and smoking had long been used to delay food spoilage, but in 1809 Nicolas Appert invented a process of heat sterilisation and airtight bottling for food preservation on an industrial scale. Why it worked would not be explained until Louis Pasteur's ground breaking research in 1864, but the process was swiftly and widely adopted. Appert used glass because the quality of French tinplate was poor, but good quality tinplate was widely available in the UK. Philippe de Girard in France suggested its use to Peter Durand in England, who took out a patent on the process in 1810, which he sold to industrialist Bryan Donkin in 1812 for £1,000 (equivalent to £61,000 in 2025). The British Admiralty placed substantial orders for meat preserved in tin cans in 1814. Canning remained a manual process for many years until Max Ams invented the double seam for cans in 1896, making it possible to use an automated process to fill and close them. The use of cans simplified storage and distribution of foods, and reduced waste and the incidence of food-related illness.

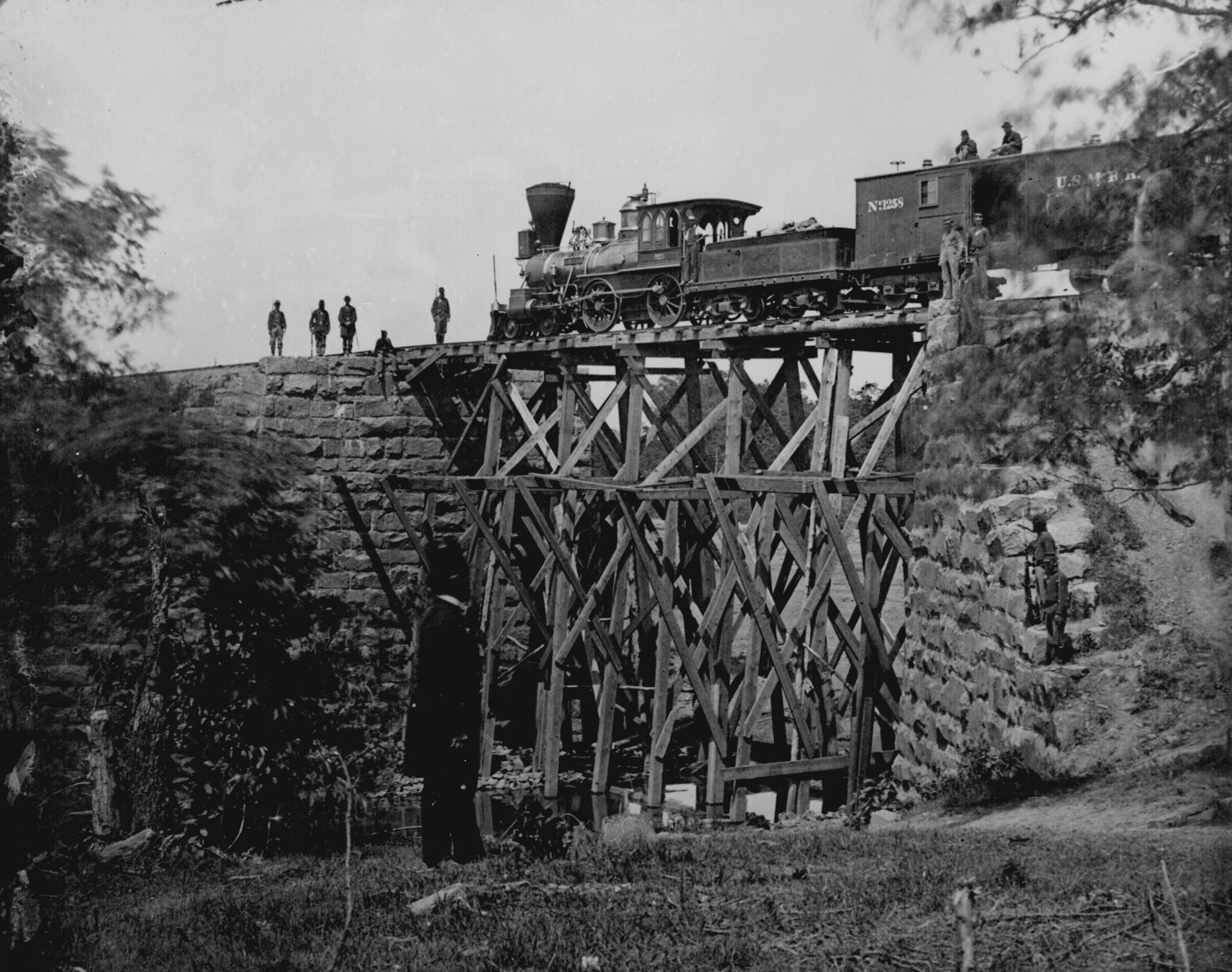
United States Military Railroad engineers monitor the first use of a wooden trestle bridge they have built to replace the masonry bridge demolished by Confederates on the Orange and Alexandria Railroad in northern Virginia, c. 1863

A practical mechanical refrigeration process was developed in Australia by James Harrison and patented in the UK by him in 1856, and by the 1880s reefer ships were plying the oceans. Richard Trevithick developed the first high-pressure steam engine in 1801 and the first working railway steam locomotive in 1804. Steam power had great advantages for vessels that plied rivers, where twists and turns meant changes of course but the narrow confines of the river made it difficult to tack. Wood and coal could be obtained along the river, whereas ocean-going vessels had no such opportunity, and therefore continued to carry sails even when they had engines.

By reducing the dependence on the wind, the steam engine made shipping faster and more reliable. To allow their warships to operate around the world, the British built a global network of coaling stations. To reduce its dependence on British colliers, the United States Navy began to move to oil in 1913. For the British, this was a more painful process, as it produced coal but not oil domestically.

The first to realise the potential of rail were the Russians, who moved a force of 14,500 men from Uherské Hradiště to Kraków by rail in 1846. During the American Civil War, railways were used extensively for the transport of personnel, supplies, horses and mules, and artillery pieces. While railways were a more economic form of transport than animal-drawn carts and wagons, they were limited to tracks, and therefore could not support an advancing army unless its advance was along existing railway lines. The large armies of the American Civil War also made use of riverboats and coastal shipping, which were not so easy to damage or interdict.

During the Austro-Prussian War of 1866, railways enabled the swift mobilisation of the Prussian Army, but the problem of moving supplies from the railheads to units at the front resulted in nearly 18,000 tons of supplies stuck on trains unable to be unloaded to ground transport. During the Crimean War, the British built the first military railway, one specifically for supporting armies in the field, to support the siege of Sevastopol. The Prussian use of railways during the Franco-Prussian War is often cited as an example of logistic modernisations, but the advantages of manoeuvre were often gained by abandoning supply lines that became hopelessly congested with rear-area traffic. The Canadian government moved 4,000 troops and their supplies over the Canadian Pacific Railway to suppress the North-West Rebellion in 1885, and the Russians moved 370,000 troops along the incomplete Trans-Siberian Railway for the Russo-Japanese War in 1904.

== Twentieth and twenty-first centuries ==
=== First World War ===
Between 1870 and 1914, the population of Europe grew from 293 million to 490 million. The expansion of armies and navies was even more rapid. With the spread of military conscription and reserve systems in the decades leading up to the 20th century, the potential size of armies increased substantially. France mobilised 570,000 troops for the Franco-Prussian War and over three million on the outbreak of the First World War. The advent of industrial warfare in the form of bolt-action rifles, machine guns and quick-firing artillery sent ammunition consumption soaring. In the Franco-Prussian War, each German gun fired 199 shells on average but in 1914 the German stock of 1,000 rounds per gun were exhausted in the first month and a half of fighting.

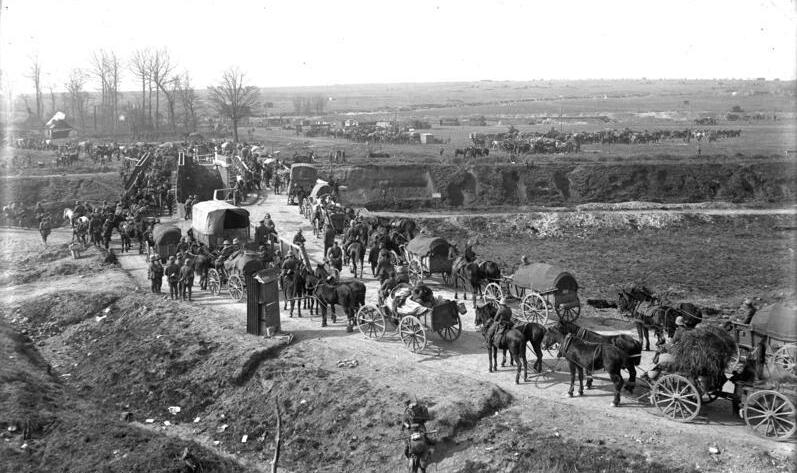
German horse-drawn supply bottleneck in front of temporary bridges during Operation Michael in 1918

In earlier wars, most artillery pieces lasted for the duration of the campaign, but now counter-battery fire was capable of destroying them. Strenuous efforts were made to step up production but constant firing led to wear and tear on the guns. The factories prioritised production of new guns over spare parts, which became scarce. Quality suffered in the haste to produce more and there were serious problems with guns and ammunition. In 1915, as many as 25 per cent of the rounds in a batch might be defective. The shortage of ammunition created a political crisis in the UK, the Shell Crisis of 1915, which led to the formation of a new coalition government.

As munitions production increased, transport became the major bottleneck. Military logistical systems continued to rely on nineteenth-century technology. The British shipped 5,337,841 tonnes (5,253,538 long tons) of ammunition to France and 5,525,875 tonnes (5,438,602 long tons) of hay and oats to feed the animals. When the war began, the rail and horse-drawn supply were stretched to their limits. Where the stalemate of trench warfare took hold, narrow gauge trench railways were built to extend the rail network to the front lines. The sheer size of the German Army proved too much for its railways to support except while immobile. From the beginning of the Battle of the Somme on 24 June to 23 July 1916, 150,000 tonnes (148,000 long tons) of ammunition had been fired but only 103,404 tonnes (101,771 long tons) were landed, the difference being made up by depleting stockpiles. The capacity of the six channel ports that handled 96 per cent of the British Expeditionary Force's requirements was increased and additional locomotives and rolling stock were imported. Between 1914 and 1918, the French laid between 5,000 and 6,000 kilometres of new track.

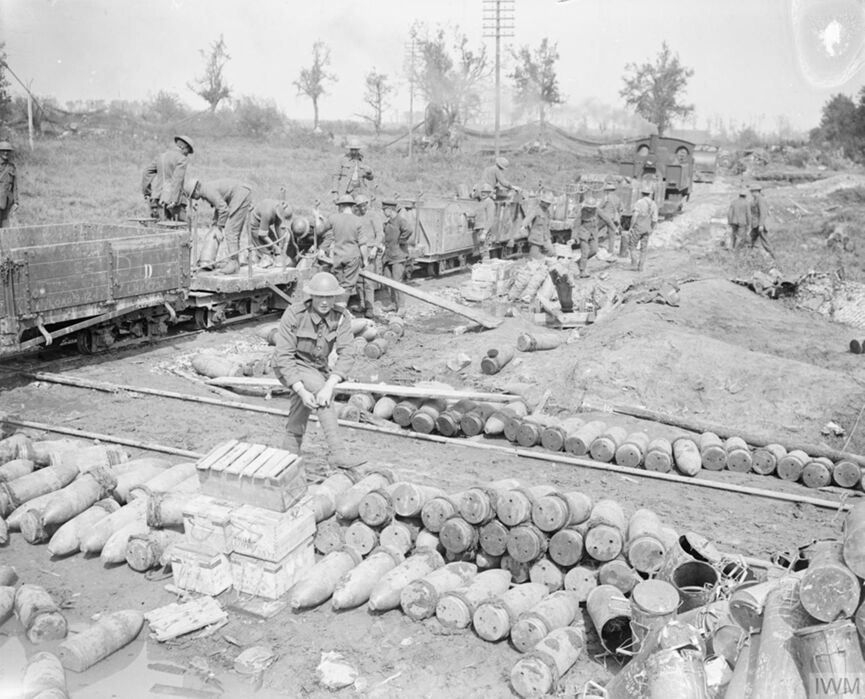
Shells are unloaded from a light railway at Brielen, north of Ypres

On the Western Front, supplies moved from the ports by rail or barge to regulating points where they were sorted before being forwarded. The supply system might be described as "semiautomatic". Certain supplies for which demand was invariant, such as fodder and rations, were sent daily without requisition in division-sized "packs" consisting of two wagons of bread, two of groceries, one of meat, four of hay, five of oats and one of petrol, a total of 15 wagons. Each pack was earmarked for a particular division and would be delivered to its own railhead. Supplies for which there was variable demand, such as reinforcements, remounts, ammunition and engineering stores, had to be indented, and were sent by the railway carload. A typical train would consist of forty wagons, two packs and ten other wagons. Each division drew its supplies from one railhead, although it might share it with other divisions.

The advent of motor vehicles powered by internal combustion engines offered an alternative to animal transport for moving supplies forward of the railhead. Though they generally require better roads and bridges, they were much faster and more efficient than animal transport. Compared with railways they had limited cargo capacity, and created logistical problems of their own with their need for fuel and spare parts. At one point the French used 11,200 trucks to move 100,000 men over 100 miles (160 km) at short notice. By 1918, the French had 90,000 motor vehicles, while the Germans had 40,000.

The movement of supplies posed greater problems on the Eastern Front, where the transportation system was less developed than in the west. The Russian economy was less developed and less efficient than that of Germany, and food and ammunition shortages developed in 1915. In turn, Russia was more developed industrially than Turkey, which nonetheless managed to last longer than Russia. This was partly because after the Gallipoli campaign the forces the British brought to bear in the Sinai and Palestine campaign and Mesopotamian campaign were in relatively remote areas of the Turkish Empire where the well-resourced British forces had to overcome supply and transportation problems to bring their power to bear. The British were able to use motor vehicles in the invasion of Darfur but in sub-Saharan Africa they were heavily reliant on human porters.

The British blockade of Germany kept a stranglehold on raw materials, goods, and food needed to support the German war effort, and is considered one of the key elements in the eventual Allied victory in the war. This form of economic warfare also involved pressure on neutral countries not to export or re-export to Germany and a program of pre-emptive purchasing. The Germans attempted to exploit occupied countries like Romania and Ukraine for oil, grain and other resources. Although the Allies controlled most of the world's shipping, Germany's unrestricted submarine warfare showed the vulnerability of merchant shipping despite Allied naval superiority. The United Kingdom was particularly vulnerable to economic blockade, as it did not produce enough food to feed itself, importing nearly two-thirds of its food. Coal and food had to be rationed.

In 1912, the biochemist, Casimir Funk, theorised that beriberi, scurvy and rickets were all diseases caused by nutrient deficiencies, naming the missing nutrient chemicals "vitamines" and over the following decades, biochemists were able to isolate them. During the First World War, the troops in the Gallipoli campaign suffered from beriberi and scurvy because the British Army's ration was deficient in these vitamins. Unlike their counterparts on the Western Front, the troops were unable to supplement their diet with local produce. A type of scurvy in the form of septic sores known as "Barcoo rot" appeared among the Australian Light Horse in the Sinai campaign, for the same reason.

=== Second World War ===
The mechanisation of warfare that started in the First World War, added the maintenance needs of military aircraft, tanks and other combat vehicles to the burden on military logistics. Many nations, including Germany, continued to rely on horse-drawn transport. Trucks were expensive to produce and their production put additional strain on scarce resources such as rubber, steel and petroleum. Petroleum was a particular problem, as the world's major sources were under the control of the Netherlands, United Kingdom, United States and the Soviet Union. Efforts were made to step up the production of synthetic fuels and rubber, but the supply of these posed difficulties throughout the war, and they came under Allied air attack. Germany's motor vehicle industry was not well developed either. It therefore made sense to continue to rely on horse-drawn transport. In 1939 a German infantry division had 942 motor vehicles and 1,200 horse-drawn carts. Even this was hard to meet, and large numbers of civilian and captured British and French vehicles were employed. The multiplicity of types created problems with spare parts.

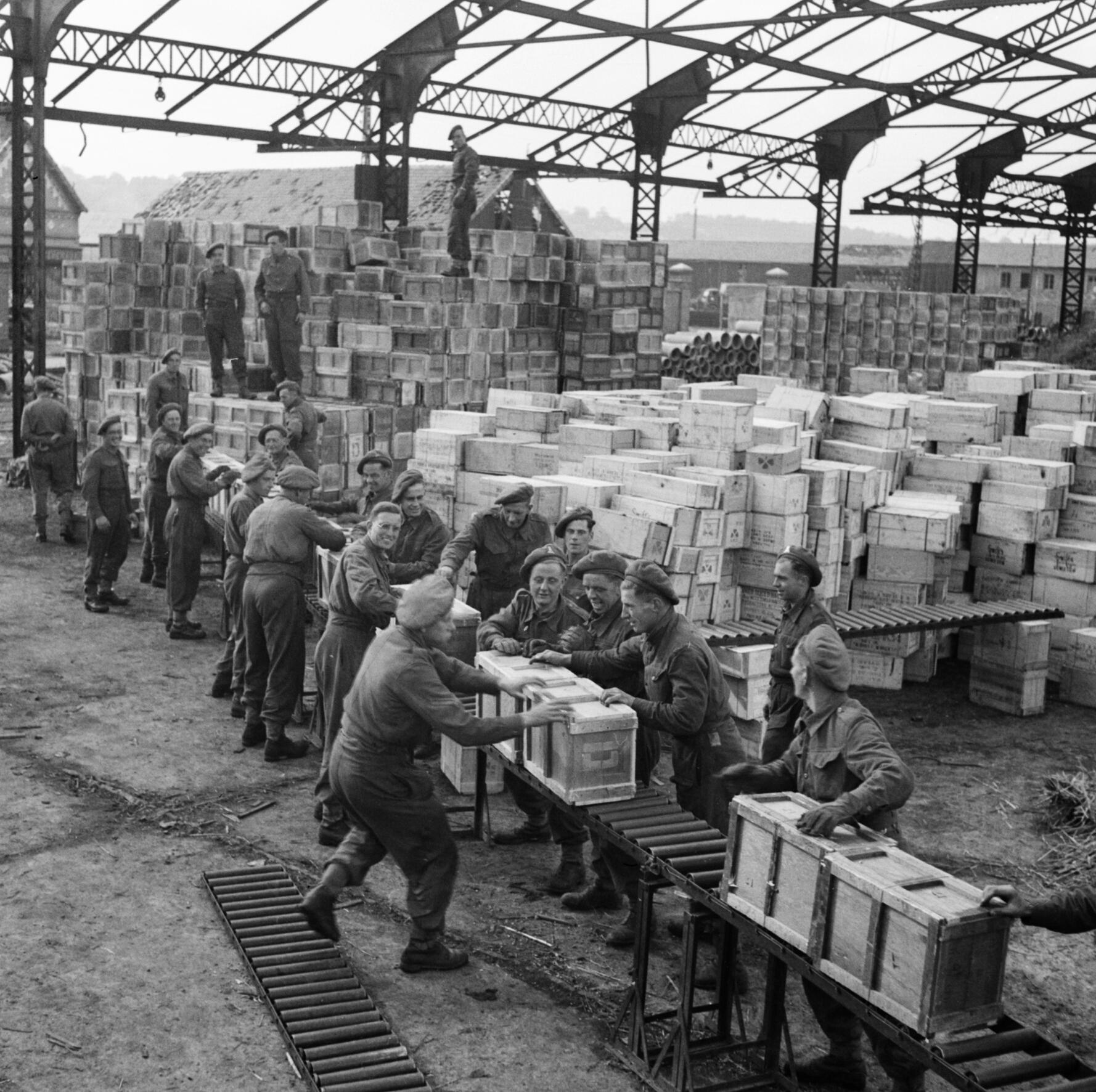
British troops stacking ration boxes in the harbour at Dieppe on 14 October 1944

The forces of the United States and United Kingdom were fully mechanised, although the British and Americans used mules in North Africa, Italy and Burma. The British and Japanese also used elephants in Burma. In the South West Pacific, human porters were used. There was little civilian demand for four-wheel drive vehicles, which were more expensive than regular vehicles, so commercial firms saw little benefit in producing them. All armies entered the war with large numbers of two-wheel drive vehicles. The need for four-wheel drive soon became apparent, especially in the less developed parts of the world, and considerable manpower and materiel had to be devoted to road making and maintenance. Similarly, the American automotive industry had scant interest in heavy trucks for long-distance hauls; the US Interstate Highway System had not yet been built, and interstate commerce was the province of rail and water transport. The US Army gave a low priority to such vehicles until the need became acute.

The increased technological and administrative complexity was reflected in the proliferation of staff and paperwork. In the United States, the Army Service Forces inventoried 200,000 paper forms and eliminated 125,000 of them. Professional analysis and simplification of common procedures was undertaken using industrial engineering techniques developed by industry.

The German invasion of the Soviet Union in 1941 faced logistical failure when the Soviet Union did not collapse after the initial frontier battles. The summer invasion meant that fodder was available for the 625,000 horses amassed for the operation, but stocks of food were low, and their seizure alienated the local population. An invasion later in the year would have avoided this, but left less time for operations before the winter set in. The distances involved, the speed of the advance, and the poor road network all contributed to the logistical difficulties, and shortages of spare parts developed for motor vehicles, which were in short supply in the first place. The bridges over the Dnieper were demolished by the retreating Soviets, and use of the railway system was hampered by the different track gauge used in the Soviet Union. Transportation difficulties made it difficult to distribute stores like winter clothing. In 1942 the German forces in the Soviet Union began to integrate the materiel and manpower resources of the occupied regions into the German war effort.

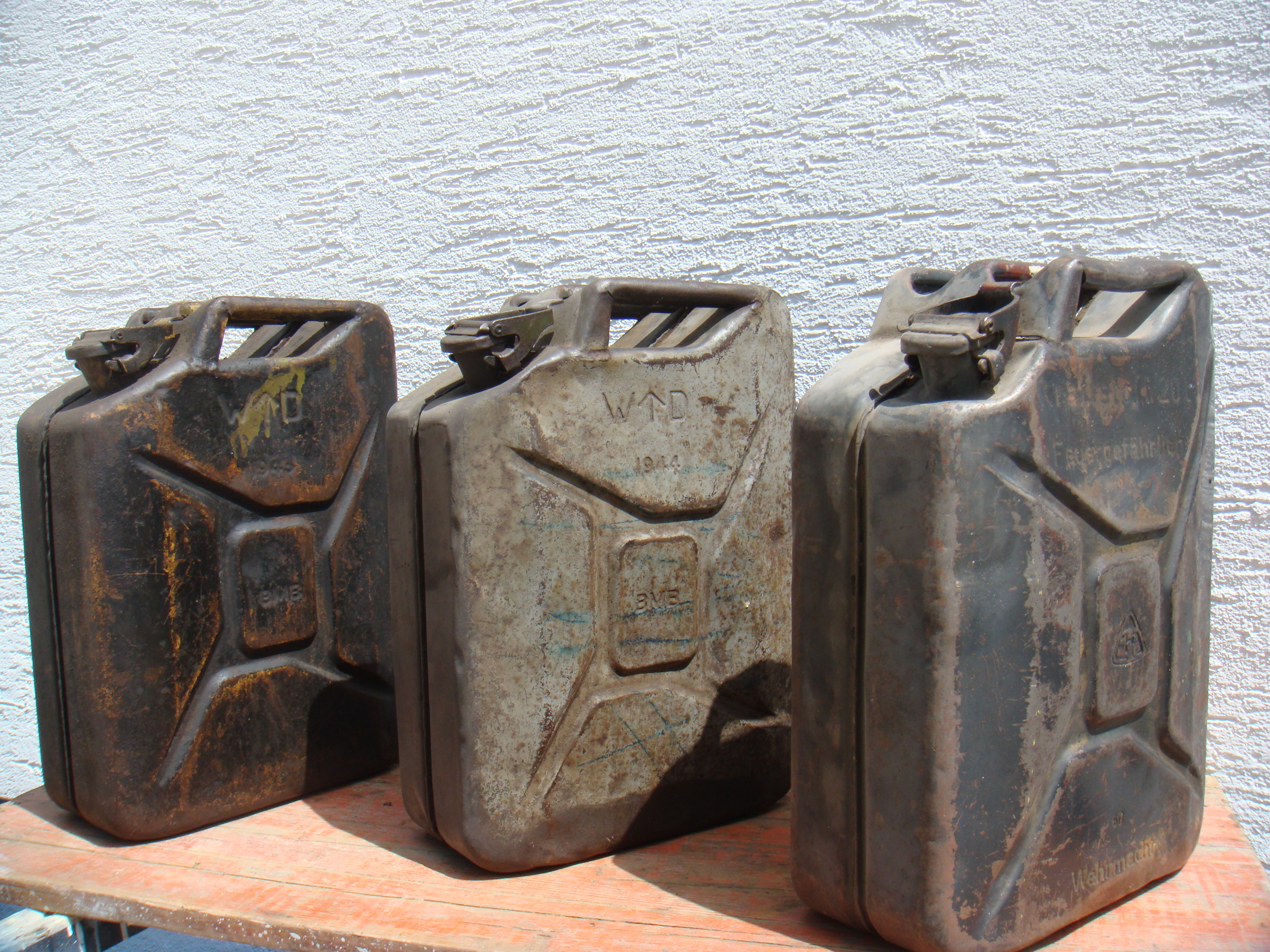
Jerrycans

Motor vehicles ran on tyres, but the supply of rubber to the Allies of World War II was curtailed when the Japanese overran the major sources of natural rubber. Imports to the United States dropped from 910,000 tonnes (900,000 long tons) in 1941 to 11,000 tonnes (11,000 long tons) in 1942. Fuel rationing and recycling measures were introduced to conserve tyres. The synthetic rubber industry in the United States grew from producing 8,400 tonnes (8,300 long tons) in 1939 to 810,000 tonnes (800,000 long tons) in 1944. Germany produced synthetic rubber and oil, much of it with slave labour at the IG Farben plant at Auschwitz .

The Japanese also captured the major sources of quinine. Malaria was a major medical and military problem in many theatres of war. The US Marines in the Guadalcanal campaign had 5,000 hospital admissions for malaria among a force of 16,000 after two months on Guadalcanal, while the Australian force at Milne Bay reported over 5,000 cases of malaria among the force of 12,000 in November 1942. Neil Hamilton Fairley persuaded the UK and US authorities to produce atebrin and plasmoquine, antimalarial drugs that had been developed in Germany in the 1920s and 1930s. The development of penicillin by Howard Florey and his team was a significant advance in the treatment of wounds with antibiotics. During the campaign in Western Europe in 1944–1945, penicillin was widely used both to treat infected wounds and as a prophylactic to prevent wounds from becoming infected. Gas gangrene had killed 150 out of every 1,000 casualties in the First World War, but the incidence of this disease now disappeared almost completely. Open fractures now had a recovery rate of better than 94 per cent, and recovery from burns of one-fifth of the body or less was 100 per cent.

In the North African campaign, the Italians struggled to supply their forces through the inadequate ports in Libya, while the British had access to the Suez. In the Siege of Tobruk, destroyers were used to resupply the garrison, as freighters were too vulnerable to air attack. At the same time, retention of the port stretched the German and Italian supply lines, making offensive action into Egypt more difficult. Resupplying the garrison of Malta was even more hazardous, requiring major operations, as were the Arctic convoys that brought aid to the Soviet Union, so much so that they had to be suspended in July and August 1942. Safer routes were developed through Iran and Siberia, and the Black Sea after it was reopened in 1945.

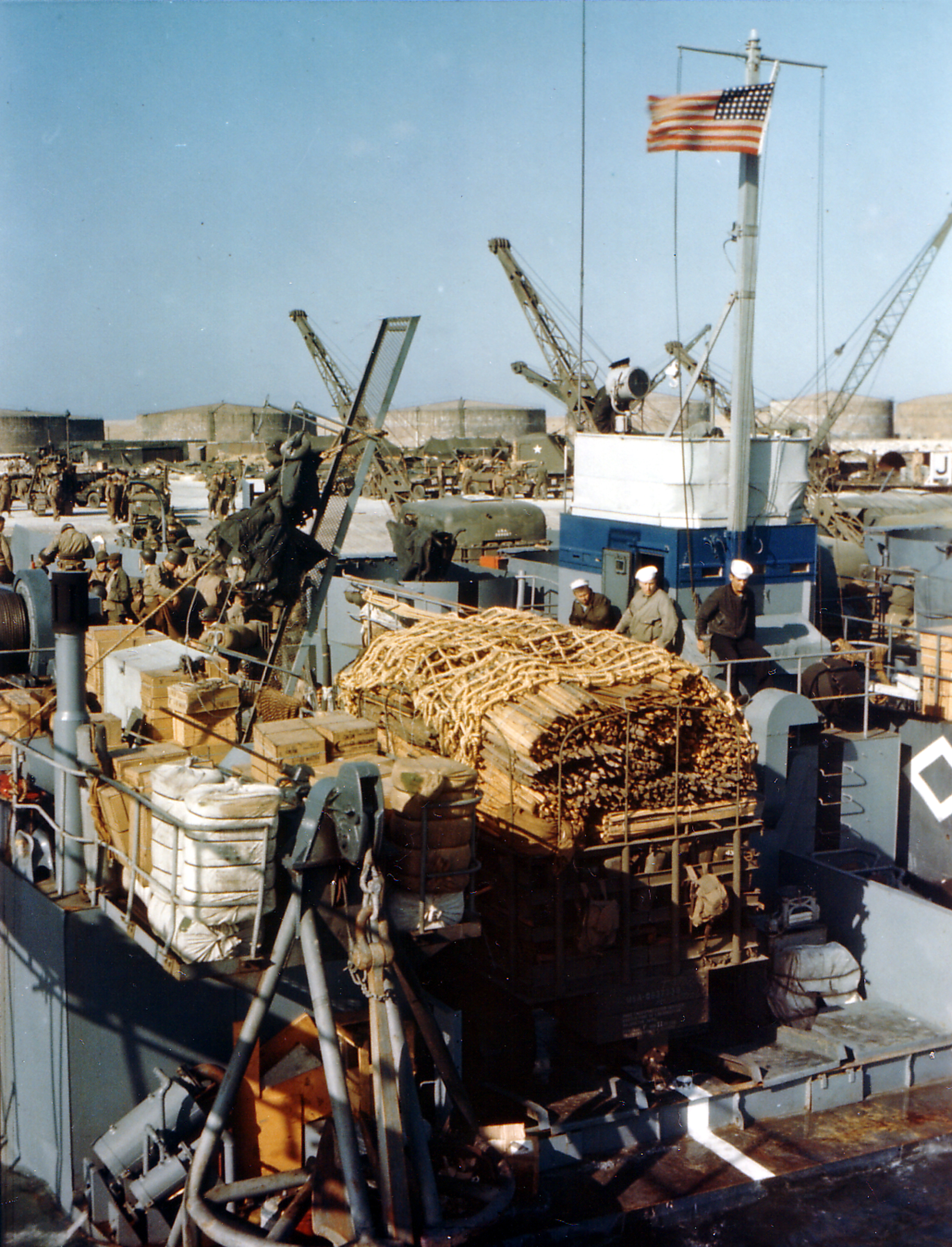
Embarking supplies for Operation Overlord

The North African campaign saw the widespread adoption of the 20 litre jerry can, a German invention that was copied by the British and Americans. The jerry can had convenient carrying handles and could be stacked. It did not shift or roll in storage, and floated in water when filled with petrol. The British version was an exact copy of the German model; the American version, called an Ameri-can by the British, was slightly smaller, with a screw cap onto which a nozzle could be fitted. It weighed 4.5 kilograms (10 lb) empty, and 18 kilograms (40 lb) when filled with petrol, so 56 filled cans weighed 1.0 tonne (1 long ton). Some 11.5 million jerry cans were provided for Operation Overlord. Of these, 10.5 million were manufactured in the UK and supplied to the US Army under Reverse Lend-Lease, while the rest came from the US.

To facilitate amphibious operations in Europe and the Pacific, the Allies developed an assortment of special vessels. There were attack transports (APA) and amphibious cargo ships (AKA), and ocean-going landing ships, most notably the landing craft, infantry (LCI), landing ship, tank (LST) that could carry tanks and trucks and land them on a beach, and the landing ship, dock (LSD), a floating dry dock that could transport landing craft and amphibious vehicles. These came in many forms, from the small landing craft, vehicle, personnel (LCVP), to the larger landing craft, mechanised (LCM) and landing craft, tank (LCT). Amphibious vehicles included the DUKW, an amphibious truck, and the Landing Vehicle Tracked (LVT).

The development of amphibious craft allowed the Allies to land in Normandy without having to quickly seize a heavily defended port. After their victory in the Battle of Normandy, the advance came to a halt in September 1944. This was not a result of inadequate supplies or port capacity – there were still some 600,000 long tons (610,000 t) of supplies stockpiled in the Normandy lodgment area in November – nor solely by a shortage of fuel. Rather, the problem was the inability to deliver fuel and supplies to the armies. Railways could not be repaired and pipelines could not be constructed quickly enough. Motor transport was used as a stopgap, but insufficient numbers of heavy trucks compelled the Army to use the smaller general purpose 2½-ton 6×6 trucks for long hauls, for which they were unsuited. The Red Ball Express was a success, but at a cost: overloading, careless driving, lack of proper vehicle maintenance, and wear and tear took their toll on the truck fleet. In the long run it was the railways that carried most of the tonnage.

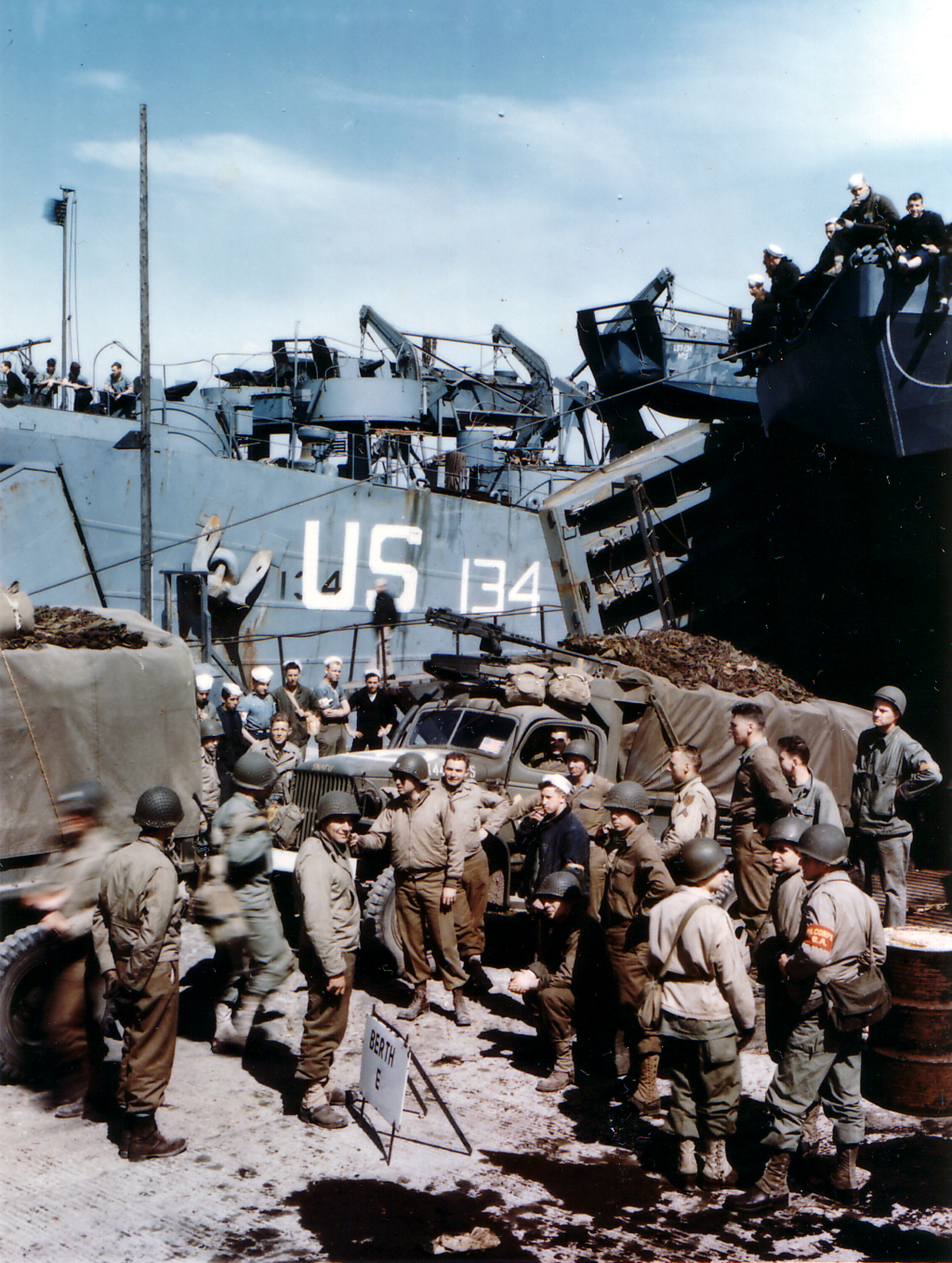
US troops disembark from an LST Normandy in 1944

Between September and November 1944, the American forces in the European Theater of Operations (ETO) were beset by severe difficulties with port discharge capacity and inland transportation infrastructure that only eased with the opening of the port of Antwerp in November. The Germans strongly defended the ports and destroyed their facilities. The shipping crisis in Europe escalated into a global one. The Allied merchant fleet was still growing at a rate of 510,000 deadweight tonnes (500,000 deadweight tons) per month, but the number of ships available for loading at US ports was shrinking due to the retention of vessels by the theatres. This represented 7,100,000 deadweight tonnes (7,000,000 deadweight tons) of shipping, which was about 30 percent of the total Allied-controlled tonnage. When ships failed to return from overseas on time, supplies piled up at the ports, depots and railway sidings in the United States.

Another wartime development was air transport, which provided an alternative to land and sea transport, but with limited tonnage and at high cost. The Germans used air transport to reinforce Tunisia after the Allies landed in North West Africa. Soon after the Germans attempted to supply the surrounded Sixth Army during the Battle of Stalingrad, but failed due to insufficient aircraft to fulfil the mission. The Allies were more successful; in the Burma Campaign, airdrops supplied the Chindits and cut off Allied units in the Battle of Kohima. An airlift over "the Hump" was used to resupply the Chinese war effort. After the war the 1948 Berlin Airlift was successful in supplying the whole non-Soviet half of the city.

Long distances dominated the Pacific War. For the attack on Pearl Harbor, the Japanese used oilers to refuel the attacking fleet at sea en route. The ability of the Japanese navy to conduct refuelling and replenishment at sea allowed it to conduct wide-ranging operations in the Pacific and Indian Oceans in the first months of 1942. In 1944, the United States Navy created service squadrons of support ships to enable the Pacific Fleet to remain at sea longer and support fast-paced operations against a succession of Japanese-held islands.

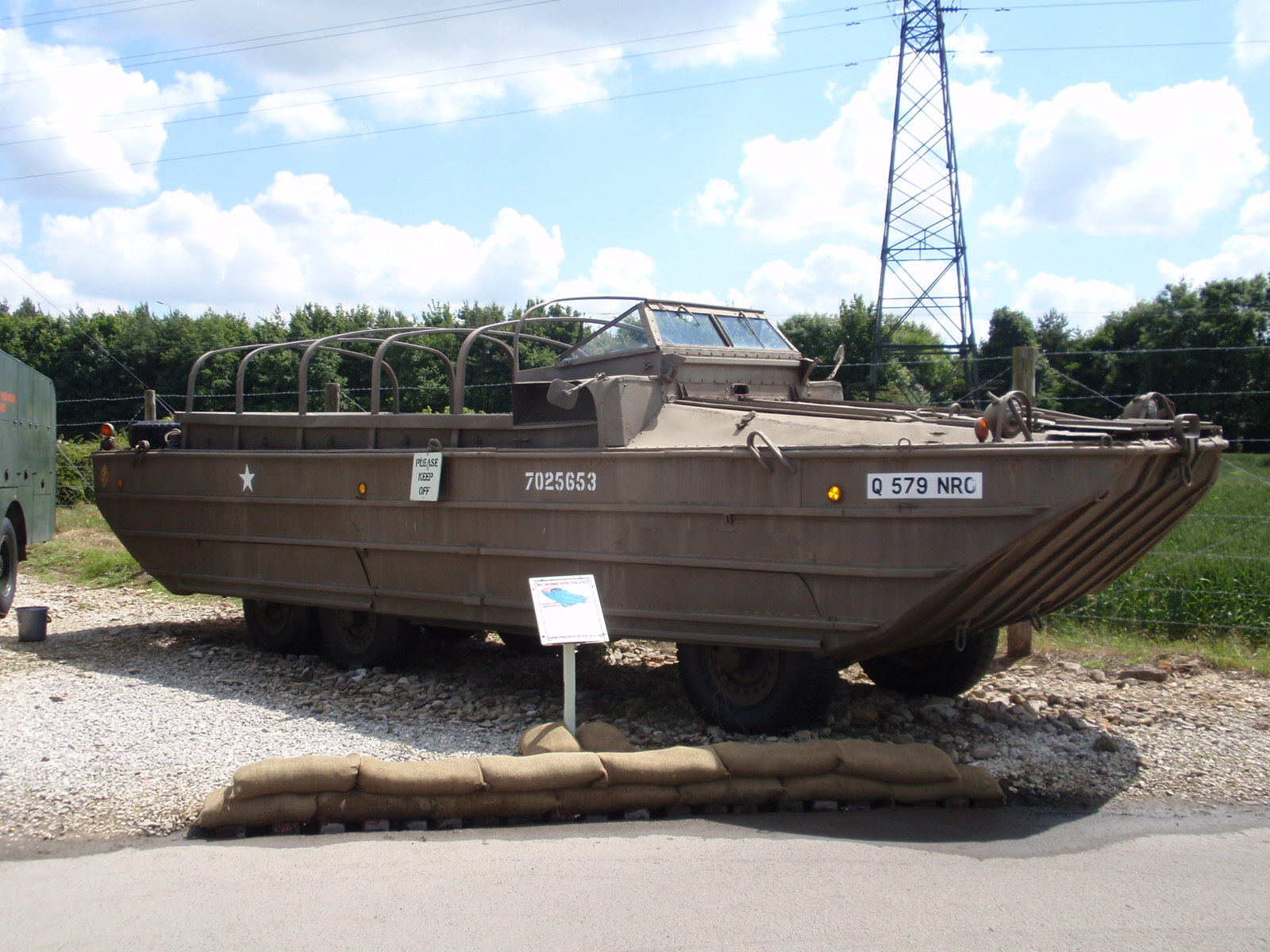
A DUKW amphibious truck

In November 1943, the Pacific Ocean Areas instituted a form of automatic supply, whereby troops and supplies were sent according to a pre-arranged schedule in a series of echelons. Shipping was held at control points to avoid congestion in forward areas, which also minimised the time when ships were most exposed to enemy attack. While wasteful in some respects, the procedure allowed for mounting of operations from widely scattered ports, avoided shipping congestion and long turnaround times, and eliminated the duplication of Army and Navy supplies. The South West Pacific Area adopted one of its key features, the block loading of ships for a particular destination.

As in Europe, there was a shipping crisis in the South West Pacific in late 1944, and for the same reason: a lack of port capacity. To ease the strain on shipping resources, the American forces made use of local procurement. While American Lend Lease aid to Australia was only 3.3% of aid to all countries, Australian Reverse Lend Lease represented 13.0% of aid to the United States. Bypassed Japanese forces in the South West Pacific Area were expected to "wither on the vine" and starve, but this did not occur; they cultivated gardens using local labour seeds and equipment imported by aircraft and submarines, which also brought in ordnance and medical supplies. They remained strong, well-organised and capable of offensive action. Australian forces conducted a series of offensives against them, which were targeted at their gardens and supplies.

=== Post-Second World War ===
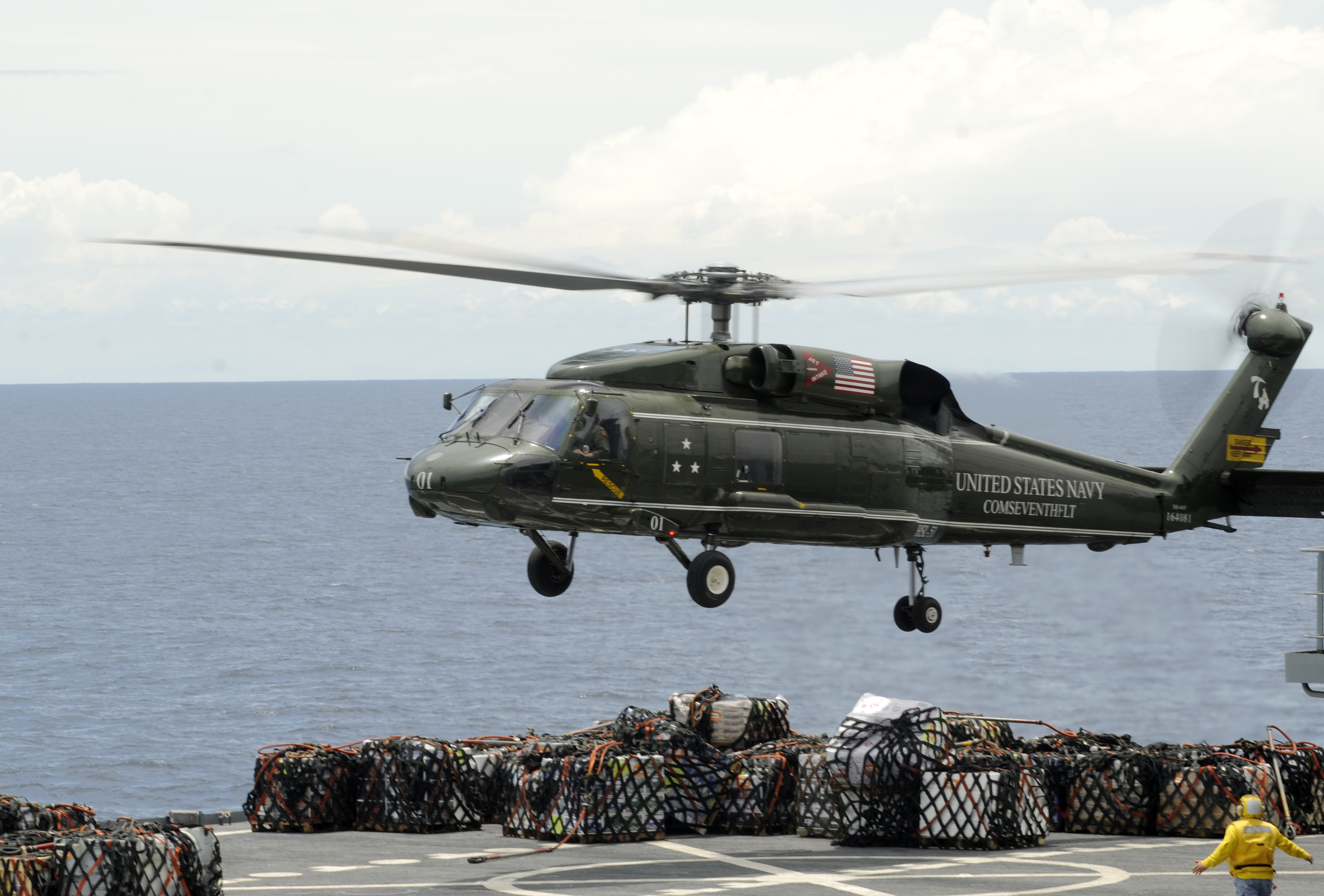
A helicopter provides supplies for the USS Blue Ridge's support of relief efforts in Japan after the 2011 Tōhoku earthquake and tsunami

Helicopters were used by the United States in the Korean War to deliver supplies. Although much slower than fixed-wing aircraft, they could move supplies rapidly over terrain that could deliver supplies in minutes to a forward area that could take hours to reach overland. While still affected by the weather, they could fly when other aircraft were grounded. They also became important for the rapid evacuation of casualties. They were used by the French in the First Indochina War, and the Algerian War, where they handled most of the tactical troop movement and casualty evacuation, and much of the logistical support.

In the Vietnam War, the U.S. Army operated a fleet of large Boeing CH-47 Chinook and Sikorsky CH-54 Tarhe helicopters. Using a technique whereby supplies in a cargo net were slung under a helicopter, a CH-47 could move a hundred tonnes of supplies within a 16-kilometre (10 mi) radius in a single day. These helicopters were also used to recover 10,000 crashed aircraft. Notably, in these conflicts victory did not always go to the side with the best logistics.

The war in Vietnam also saw the large-scale employment of containerisation. A standard steel container was designed called the Conex box that was capable of holding 4,100 kilograms (9,000 lb) and suitable for loading onto a semi-trailer or railway flat car. Eventually 150,000 of them were sent to Vietnam. The use of containers reduced port congestion and handling time, and saved money on packaging. There was less damage to cargo in transit and reduced loss through pilferage. The containers could be used in lieu of covered storage. The drawback of using containers was that they required special equipment to handle them. This became less of a problem as containerisation spread through the world, but in 1999 the International Force East Timor (INTERFET) found that East Timor had no facilities for handling containers, and special container handling cranes had to be designed and manufactured in New Zealand.

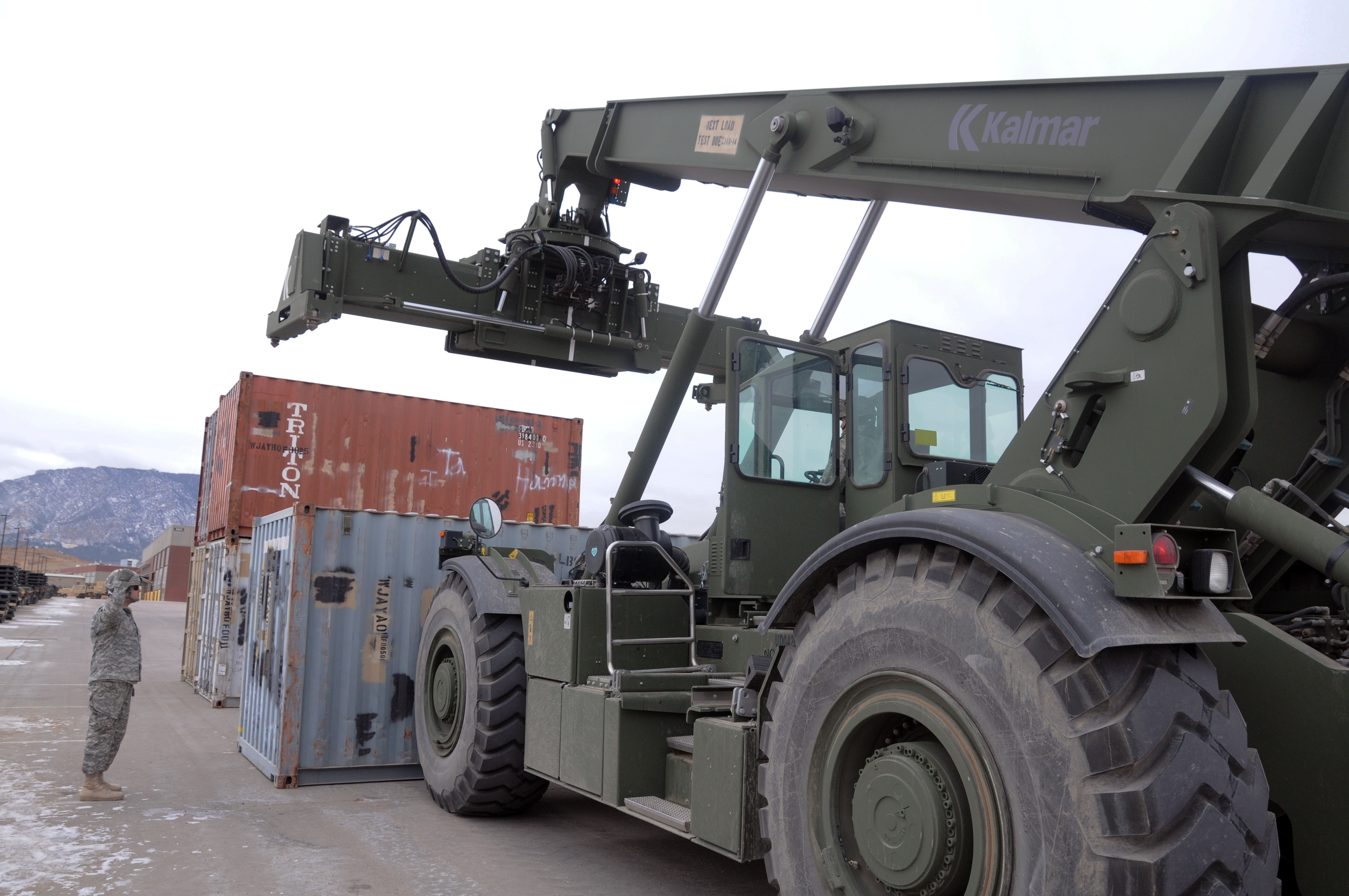
Moving shipping containers for a Rough Terrain Container Handler Course in 2013

The development of large cargo-carrying aircraft enhanced the ability of airlift to move personnel and supplies over long distances. It remains uneconomical compared with sealift, so sealift is still the preferred means of transport for cargo, particularly heavy and bulky items. Nonetheless, during the Yom Kippur War, as part of Operation Nickel Grass, American Lockheed C-141 Starlifter and Lockheed C-5 Galaxy aircraft delivered 22,683 tonnes (22,325 long tons) of supplies for Israeli forces including 29 tanks, although only four arrived before the ceasefire on 22 October 1973; just 39 per cent of the Nickel Grass materiel was delivered by then. Another 22,683 tonnes (22,325 long tons) was sent by sea, none of which arrived before the ceasefire.

During the initial stage of the Gulf War from 7 August to 8 November 1991, some 187,000 U.S. troops were deployed to Saudi Arabia, 99.22 per cent of them by air. Airlift also accounted for 15.3 per cent of the cargo, some 161,804 tonnes (178,358 short tons). The second phase of deployment, from 8 November 1991 to 16 January 1992, involved the movement of 391,604 troops by air, the majority of whom travelled on commercial flights, and 326,223 tonnes (359,599 short tons) of cargo, representing 14.5 per cent of the total. The seaports of Saudi Arabia were world class, much better than their counterparts in the United States, with 60 piers, of which the U.S. forces used 15. Sealift carried 85.5 per cent of the dry cargo and 1,869,990 tonnes (2,061,310 short tons) of petroleum products in this phase.

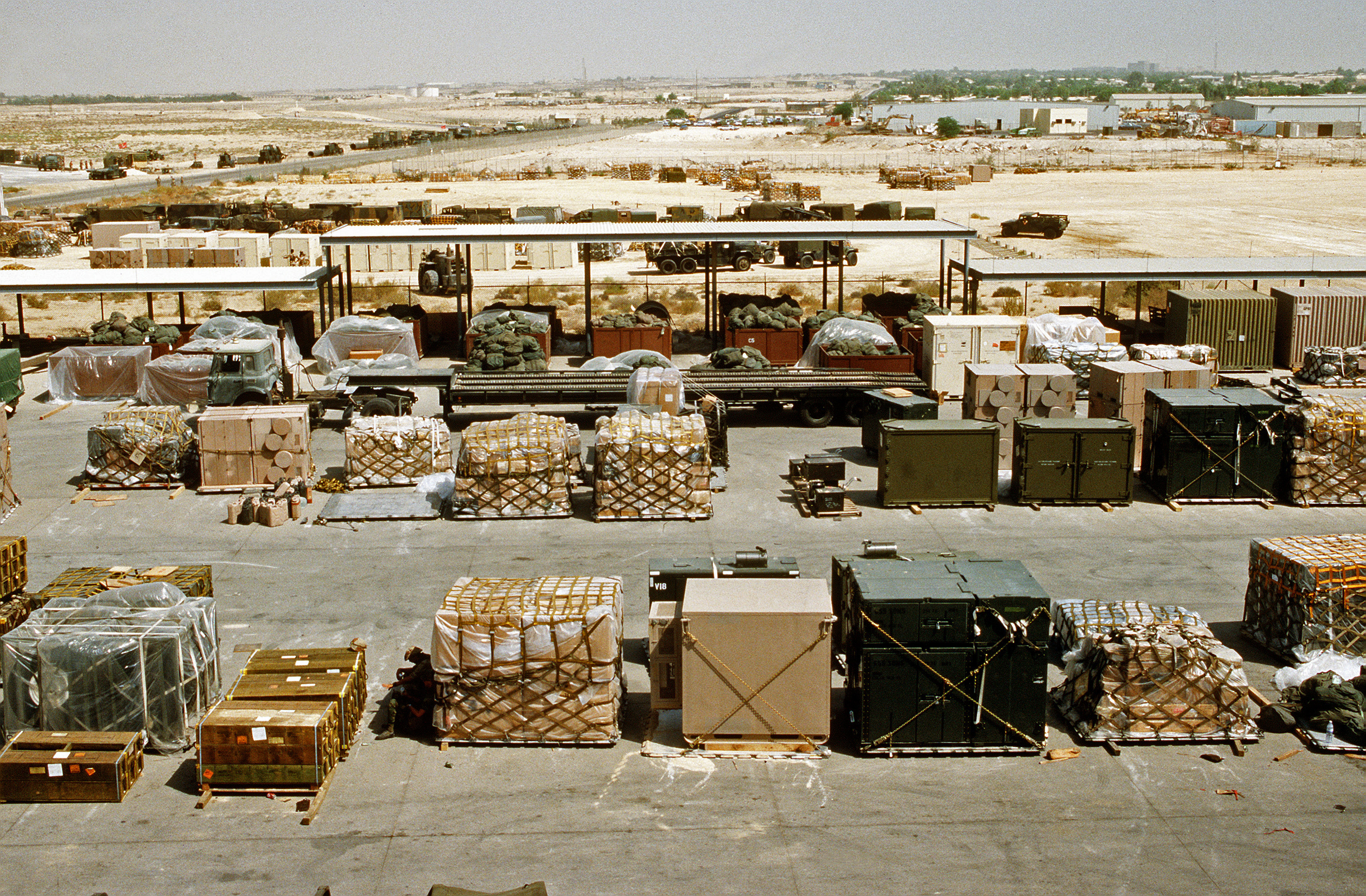
Pallets and containers of equipment in a logistics support area during Operation Desert Shield in 1991

As the twentieth century drew to a close, the increasing complexity of new weapons systems became a concern. While new technologies were intended to make armies more lethal and less reliant on manpower, they did not always live up to their promise. In the 1982 Falklands War, the logistical implications of the Rapier missile launchers were not initially appreciated. Generally located on hilltops without roads or tracks, they had to be sited by helicopter. If they had to be moved, whether yards or miles, another helicopter sortie was called for. They required fuel to keep their generators running, and their isolated sites required the full-time service of a Westland Sea King helicopter, itself a voracious consumer of fuel, to keep them going.

The increasing complexity of weapons and equipment saw the proportion of personnel devoted to logistics in the US Army rise from 39 per cent in the American Expeditionary Forces in the First World War to 45 per cent in the ETO in the Second World War, but declined to 42 per cent in the Korean War, and 35 per cent in the Vietnam War. Concerns about the low tooth-to-tail ratio saw a mandated ratio put in place, but the widespread use of civilian contractors saw the proportion of people devoted to logistical functions rise to 55 per cent in 2005 during the Iraq War.

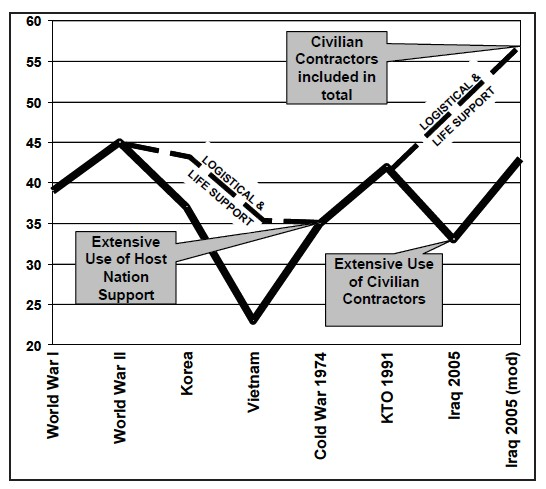
Percentage of logistical personnel in US Army operations, 1917–2007

Complex systems like the M1 Abrams tank require more knowledge and more skilled personnel to operate, maintain and repair, and resist easy modification. The M1 required three times the fuel of the older M60 tank, and 20 per cent more spare parts. When committed to action in the Gulf War, many Abrams tank crews exhausted their stock of spare parts, which could have become a serious problem had the fighting lasted more than 100 hours. On the other hand, 300,000 rounds of artillery, antiaircraft and tank ammunition were shipped only to be returned, largely owing to the greater lethality of modern weapons lowering ammunition consumption rates. The high fuel usage led to reconsideration of proposals to use a diesel engine instead.

The diversity of equipment and consequent large number of spare parts stocked by the NATO saw attempts at standardisation. By the 21st century, there were over 1,000 NATO standardization agreements, covering everything from ammunition calibres to rail gauges and the terminology that troops use to communicate with each other. The adoption of standardisation as policy promised benefits through reducing inventories, allowing alliance partners to draw on each other's stockpiles and repair services, reducing support overheads, and lower costs through consolidation of research and development and the economies of scale of larger production runs. Most countries had no choice, as they lacked the industry and technology to manufacture complex modern weapons systems. However the adoption of foreign weapons also meant the adoption of foreign tactics, and giving up the advantages of bespoke systems tailored to the nation's own, often unique, strategic environment.

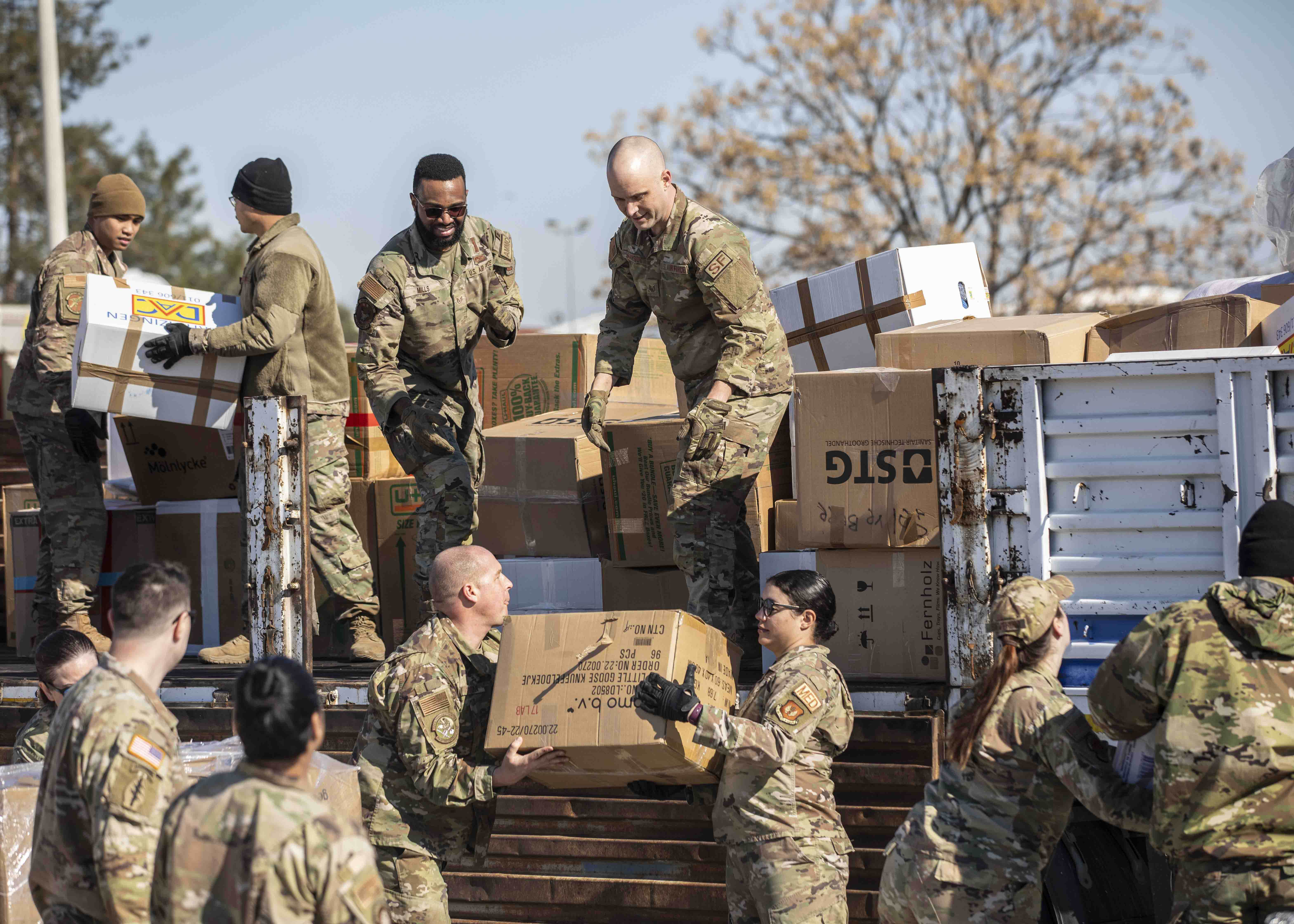
Humanitarian response to the 2023 Turkey–Syria earthquake

The management of spare parts became a major concern. When items were produced, it was not known how many of each spare part would be needed. Failure to estimate correctly meant inventories of spare parts that were never needed and shortages of others. Keeping old equipment rather than buying new seemed a sensible option, and sometimes the only one, for many armies, but the cost of keeping old vehicles and equipment running could also become uneconomical if not prohibitive.

In the late 20th century, the number of natural disasters increased from 50 a year in 1960 to 350 a year in 2010. While not their primary role in most countries, national and international military forces were increasingly engaged in such activities since they possessed the manpower, equipment and organization to deal with them. Up to 80 per cent of the total spent on disaster relief activities involved logistics operations, of which more than 40 per cent was wasted through duplication, lack of time to carry out adequate planning, and other factors.

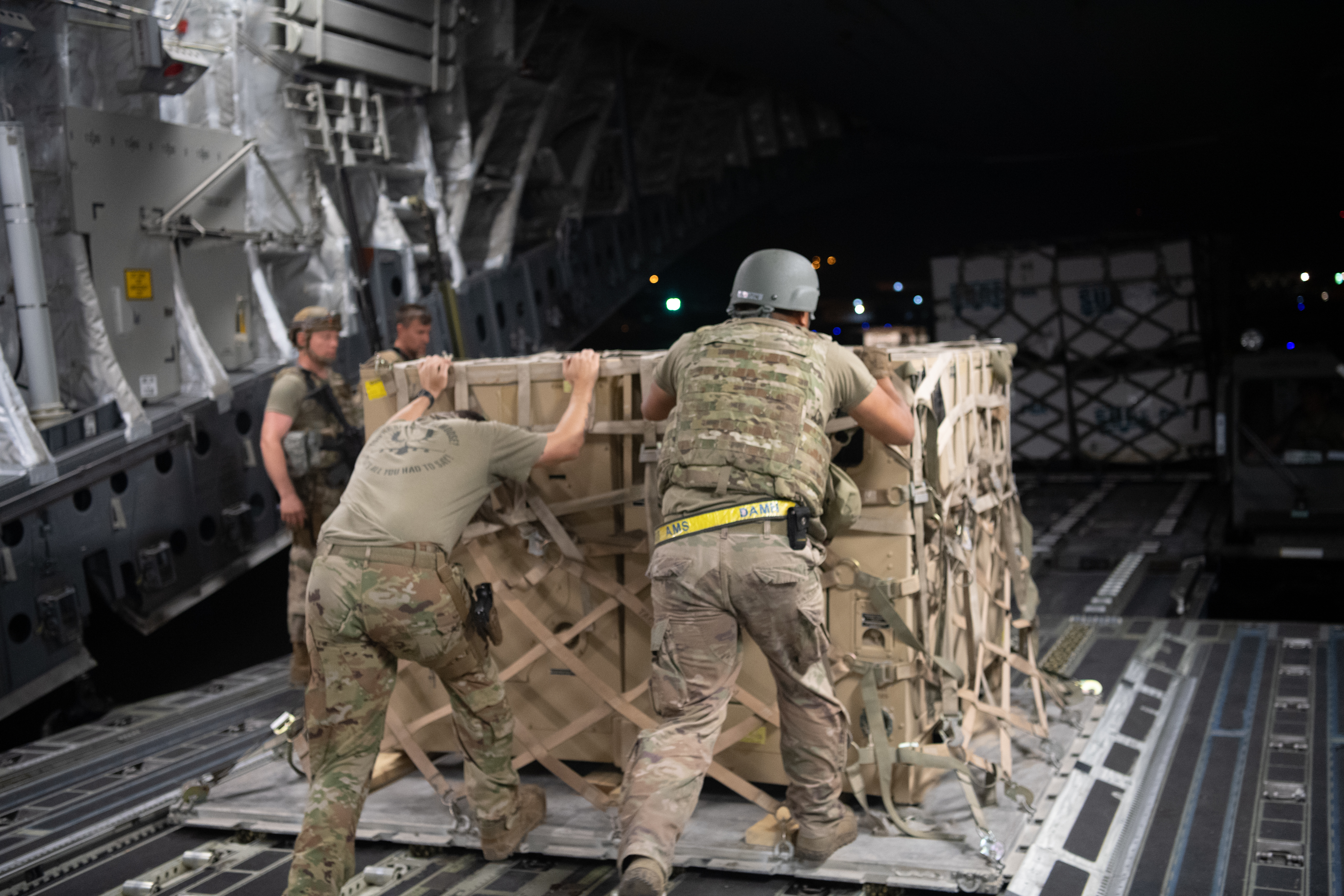
U.S. Air Force loadmasters unload cargo from a C-17 Globemaster III aircraft in support of Operation Allies Refuge at Hamid Karzai International Airport in Afghanistan in 2021

Although military logistics was an older discipline than its business counterpart, in the twenty-first century the adoption of new tools, techniques and technologies saw the latter overtake the former. Techniques were imported to military logistics that had been developed in the business world, such as just-in-time manufacturing. This greatly reduced the costs involved in storage and handling of items, but in the combat environment of the Iraq War, the drawbacks became all too clear when suppliers and transport resources could not respond to rapidly changing patterns of demand. Shortages developed, and units responded by reverting to traditional just-in-case logistics, stockpiling items that they thought they might need.

The Russian invasion of Ukraine in 2022 encountered severe logistical difficulties due to poor planning, notably a failure to anticipate the degree of resistance that was actually encountered. The logistical resources required were not on hand even though the capability existed. As equipment broke down through use and battle damage, a shortage of spare parts developed, which was compounded by inadequate numbers of trained maintenance personnel. Although Russia was the world's second largest producer of armaments, its industrial base still struggled to replace materiel losses incurred in high-intensity combat. Even routine sustainment became difficult, with ground transport subject to interdiction by standoff missiles. Strategic failure then followed from logistical failure. The war in Ukraine saw the use of unmanned aerial vehicles for logistic support. The Americans experimented with BigDog, a quadruped military robot.
