= Remonetisation =

Remonetisation is the restoration of some commodity such as silver or coins or bank notes that are not money as money. It is the reverse of demonetisation. It is often suggested to try and stabilize a failing currency such as going back to a gold standard. Another option is such cases is currency substitution.

== See also ==
- Denomination (currency)
- Monetization
- Legal tender#Demonetization
