= Monetization =

Making money out of something

Monetisation (also spelled monetization in the USA) is, broadly speaking, the process of converting something into money. The term has a broad range of uses. In banking, the term refers to the process of converting or establishing something into legal tender. While it usually refers to the coining of currency or the printing of banknotes by central banks, it may also take the form of a promissory currency. The term "monetization" may also be used informally to refer to exchanging possessions for cash or cash equivalents, including selling a security interest, charging fees for something that used to be free, or attempting to make money on goods or services that were previously unprofitable or had been considered to have the potential to earn profits. And data monetisation refers to a spectrum of ways information assets can be converted into economic value.

Another meaning of "monetisation" denotes the process by which the U.S. Treasury accounts for the face value of outstanding coinage. This procedure can extend even to one-of-a-kind situations such as when the Treasury Department sold an extremely rare 1933 Double Eagle. The coin's nominal value of $20 was added to the final sale price, reflecting the fact that the coin was considered to have been issued into circulation as a result of the transaction. In some industry sectors such as high technology and marketing, monetization is a buzzword for adapting non-revenue-generating assets to generate revenue.

== Promissory currency ==
Such commodities as gold, diamonds, and emeralds have generally been regarded by human populations as having an intrinsic value within that population based on their rarity or quality and thus provide a premium not associated with fiat currency unless that currency is "promissory". That is, the currency promises to deliver a given amount of a recognized commodity of a universally (globally) agreed-to rarity and value, providing the currency with the foundation of legitimacy or value. Though rarely the case with paper currency, even intrinsically relatively worthless items or commodities can be made into money, so long as they are challenging to make or acquire.

== Debt monetisation ==
Debt monetization is the financing of government spending by the central bank. If a nation's expenditure exceeds its revenues, it incurs a government deficit which can be financed either:

- by the government treasury, by way of
  - money it already holds (e.g. income or liquidations from a sovereign wealth fund); or
  - issuing new bonds; or
- by the central bank, through money it creates de novo

In the latter case, the central bank may purchase government bonds by conducting an open market purchase, i.e. by increasing the monetary base through the money creation process. If government bonds that have come due are held by the central bank, the central bank will return any funds paid to it back to the treasury. Thus, the treasury may "borrow" money without needing to repay it. This process of financing government spending is called "monetising the debt".

In most high-income countries the government assigns exclusive power to issue its national currency to a central bank, but central banks may be forbidden by law from purchasing debt directly from the government. For example, the Treaty on the Functioning of the European Union (article 123) forbids EU central banks' direct purchase of debt of EU public bodies such as national governments.

== Revenue from business operations ==
Web sites and mobile apps that generate revenue are often monetised via online advertisements, subscription fees, or (in the case of apps) in-app purchases. In the music industry, monetisation is achieved by placing ads before, after, or in the middle of content on a platform that supports this or posting the music on on-demand apps like Spotify and Apple Music. On-demand content sites like Spotify and Apple Music pay the artist a percentage of the monthly subscription fees they receive from their users. To put release music on streaming apps like Spotify and Apple Music, an artist has to reach out to a distributor like TuneCore or Distrokid. They are the one who do make the music available on streaming sites. This is usually done for a percentage of the revenue generation. For each public viewing, the advertising revenue is shared with the artist or others who hold rights to the video content. A previously free product may have premium options added thus becoming freemium.

Businesses monetise their value propositions to generate the resources necessary for continued operation through a business model or revenue model. Failure to monetize websites due to an inadequate revenue model was a problem that caused many businesses to fold during the dot-com bust.

Equally, David Sands, CTO for Citibank Equity Research, affirmed that failure to achieve monetisation of the Research Analysts' models as the reason the de-bundling of Equity Research has never taken hold.

On the other hand, aggressive monetisation refers to how a firm or business is overemphasising the process of making money at the cost of the user's well-being. The over-emphasis generate equal resistance from the users due to perceived unfairness and psychological reactance.

== Monetisation of non-monetary benefits ==
Monetisation is also used to refer to the process of converting some benefit received in non-monetary form (such as milk) into a monetary payment. The term is used in social welfare reform when converting in-kind payments (such as food stamps or other free benefits) into some "equivalent" cash payment. From the point of view of economics and efficiency, it is usually considered better to give someone a monetary equivalent of some benefit than the benefit (say, a liter of milk) in kind.

- Inefficiency: in the latter situation people who may not need milk cannot get something of equivalent value (without subsequently trading or selling the milk).
- Black market growth: people who need something other than milk may sell it. In many circumstances, this action may be illegal and considered fraudulent. For example, Moscow pensioners (see below for details) often give their personal cards that allow free usage of local transport to relatives who use public transport more frequently.
- Changes on the market: supply of milk to the market is reduced by the amount distributed to the privileged group, so the price and availability of milk may change.
- Corruption: firms that should give this benefit have an advantage as they have guaranteed consumers and the quality of the goods supplied is controlled only administratively, not by market competition. So, bribes to the body that choose such firms and/or maintain control can take place.

=== Russian social welfare monetisation of 2005 ===
In 2005, Russia transformed most of its in-kind benefits into monetary compensation.

Before this reform there was a large system of preferences: free/reduced price of travels on local transport, free supply of drugs, free health resort treatment, etc. for diverse categories of society: military personnel, the disabled, and separately, persons disabled due to World War II, Chernobyl liquidators, inhabitants of Leningrad during the siege, former political prisoners, and for all pensioners (that is, women 55+, men 60+). This system was a legacy of the Soviet Union, but it was heavily extended by populist laws passed by central and regional authorities during the 1990s. By the law 122-ФЗ of 22 August 2004, this system was converted into cash payments by various means:

- abolition of preference, compensated by raising of wage (e.g. free use of local transport for military personnel) or pension (e.g. different preferences for Chernobyl liquidators)
- for the three most important preferences (free local transport, 50%-price suburban rail transport, free supply of drugs): a choice between the preference and some extra money.

The main causes of friction in the reform were the following:

- technical and bureaucratic problems (e.g. for usage of the 50% discount for suburban rail transport, a person would need to present a paper from the local State Pension Fund office stating that he/she doesn't choose monetary compensation);
- separation of all preference-recipients into federal and regional according to the body authorising the preference. The largest group – pensioners – was regional, and this caused most of the problems:
  - In poor regions, financial pressure caused the local government to abolish these preferences with little or no compensation to the former recipients.
  - Even if the preferences were retained, they would apply only to pensioners of the region in question. Thus, pensioners from the Moscow Oblast (administrative region), for example, could not freely use the metro and buses in Moscow proper, because these are two different local governments. Later, most of these problems would be solved by a series of bi-lateral agreements between neighboring regions.

A wave of protests emerged in various parts of Russia in the beginning of 2005 as this law started to take effect. The government responded with measures that eventually addressed the most pressing of the protesters' concerns (raising of compensations, normalisation of bureaucratic mechanisms, etc.).

The long-term effects of the monetisation reform varied for different groups. Some people received compensation in excess of the services they had previously received (e.g. in rural areas without any local transport, the free transport benefit was of little value), while others found the compensation to be insufficient to cover the cost of the benefits they had previously depended on. Transport companies and railroads have benefitted from monetisation as they now collect higher revenue from the use their services by pensioners who had previously ridden at the government's expense. (In some regions, more than half of the passengers formerly did not pay for municipal transport, but the government did not compensate the transport companies for the full fare of these passengers.) Effects on the medical system are controversial. Doctors and nurses have to fill out many forms in order to receive compensation from the government for services provided to pensioners, thus reducing the time that they have to provide medical services.

=== United States agricultural policy ===
In United States agricultural policy, "monetisation" is a P.L. 480 provision (section 203) first included in the Food Security Act of 1985 (P.L. 99–198) that allows private voluntary organisations and cooperatives to sell a percentage of donated P.L. 480 commodities in the recipient country or in countries in the same region. Under section 203, private voluntary organisations or cooperatives are permitted to sell (i.e., monetise) for local currencies or dollars an amount of commodities equal to not less than 15% of the total amount of commodities distributed in any fiscal year in a country. The currency generated by these sales can then be used: to finance internal transportation, storage, or distribution of commodities; to implement development projects; or to invest and with the interest earned used to finance distribution costs or projects.

== See also ==
- Data monetization
- Debt monetization
- Demonetization in legal tender
- Economy monetization
- Monetized installment sale
- Patent monetization
- Remonetisation
- Software monetization
- Video game monetization
- Website monetization
