= National Register of Historic Places listings in Lafayette County, Mississippi =

Location of Lafayette County in Mississippi

This is a list of the National Register of Historic Places listings in Lafayette County, Mississippi.

This is intended to be a complete list of the properties and districts on the National Register of Historic Places in Lafayette County, Mississippi, United States. Latitude and longitude coordinates are provided for many National Register properties and districts; these locations may be seen together in a map.

There are 17 properties and districts listed on the National Register in the county, including 4 National Historic Landmarks.

This National Park Service list is complete through NPS recent listings posted March 20, 2026.

== Current listings ==
	Name on the Register	Image	Date listed	Location	City or town	Description
1	Abbeville Colored School	Abbeville Colored School	February 22, 2021 (#100006175)	West side of Cty. Rd, 115; 34°28′25″N 89°30′38″W	Abbeville	
2	Ammadelle	Ammadelle	May 30, 1974 (#74001064)	637 N. Lamar St. 34°22′20″N 89°31′11″W	Oxford	
3	Avent Acres Neighborhood Historic District		July 14, 2020 (#100004508)	Approx. Lamar Ave. and Oxford Apartments; Parcels 135L-21-059.00, 135L-21-062.00, 35L-21-078.00 & 35L-21-078.00; Douglas Dr.;and Sisk Ave. 34°22′23″N 89°30′44″W	Oxford	
4	Barnard Observatory	Barnard Observatory	December 8, 1978 (#78001607)	University of Mississippi campus 34°21′58″N 89°32′04″W	Oxford	
5	College Church	College Church	November 13, 1979 (#79001324)	College Hill Rd. 34°25′23″N 89°34′06″W	College Hill	Built in 1844 and said to be the oldest Presbyterian church in North Mississippi. Destroyed by a fire on August 13, 2022.
6	William Faulkner House	William Faulkner House	May 23, 1968 (#68000028)	Old Taylor Rd. 34°21′30″N 89°31′32″W	Oxford	
7	Hopewell Presbyterian Church	Hopewell Presbyterian Church	July 15, 1999 (#99000837)	2070 Mississippi Highway 10; 34°23′37″N 89°24′41″W	Oxford	
8	Isom Place	Isom Place	April 2, 1980 (#80002256)	1003 Jefferson Ave. 34°22′09″N 89°31′10″W	Oxford	
9	Lafayette County Courthouse	Lafayette County Courthouse	September 23, 1977 (#77000791)	Courthouse Sq. 34°22′00″N 89°31′06″W	Oxford	
10	Lucius Quintus Cincinnatus Lamar House	Lucius Quintus Cincinnatus Lamar House	May 15, 1975 (#75001048)	616 N. 14th St. 34°22′20″N 89°30′55″W	Oxford	
11	Lyceum-The Circle Historic District	Lyceum-The Circle Historic District	October 6, 2008 (#08001092)	University Circle at the University of Mississippi; 34°21′56″N 89°32′07″W	Oxford	
12	North Lamar Historic District	North Lamar Historic District	November 14, 2007 (#07001181)	Roughly bounded by N. 11th, Price, N. 16th, and Van Buren Sts. 34°22′07″N 89°31′06″W	Oxford	
13	Oxford Courthouse Square Historic District	Oxford Courthouse Square Historic District	April 2, 1980 (#80002257)	S. Lamar Boulevard and Jackson and Van Buren Aves. 34°21′58″N 89°31′04″W	Oxford	
14	Sand Spring Presbyterian Church	Sand Spring Presbyterian Church	February 25, 1993 (#93000083)	Junction of County Roads 354 and 399 in Orwood, northwest of Water Valley; 34°15′24″N 89°42′55″W	Water Valley	
15	St. Peter's Episcopal Church	St. Peter's Episcopal Church	July 24, 1975 (#75001049)	113 S. 9th St. 34°22′00″N 89°31′13″W	Oxford	
16	South Lamar Historic District	South Lamar Historic District	March 10, 2009 (#09000112)	S. Lamar Boulevard and University Ave. 34°21′46″N 89°31′10″W	Oxford	
17	George Wright Young House	George Wright Young House	November 14, 2007 (#07001182)	100 County Road 233; 34°23′22″N 89°23′39″W	Oxford	

== See also ==
- List of National Historic Landmarks in Mississippi
- National Register of Historic Places listings in Mississippi
