= Lucius Q. C. Lamar House =

Historic house in Mississippi, United States

- U.S. National Register of Historic Places
- U.S. National Historic Landmark
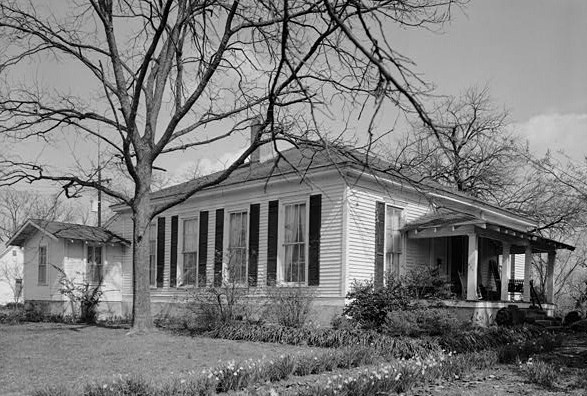
- Lucius Q. C. Lamar House in 1975

- Location within Mississippi Location within the United States
- Interactive map showing the location of Lucius Q.C. Lamar House
- Location: 616 North 14th Street, Oxford, Mississippi
- Coordinates: 34°22′19.86″N 89°30′55.01″W
- Built: 1869
- NRHP reference No.: 75001048

Significant dates
- Added to NRHP: May 15, 1975
- Designated NHL: May 15, 1975

The Lucius Quintus Cincinnatus Lamar House is a historic house museum at 616 North 14th Street in Oxford, Mississippi. Its mission is "to interpret the life and career of the distinguished 19th-century statesman L.Q.C. Lamar within the context of his times and to encourage the ideal of statesmanship in the 21st century". Admission is free and open to the public Fridays, Saturdays, and Sundays from 1-4 pm unless otherwise advertised. The house was designated a National Historic Landmark in 1975.

== Background ==
The Lucius Q. C. Lamar House is a site significant for its association with Lucius Quintus Cincinnatus Lamar II, who lived there while a Congressman and U.S. cabinet member. Lamar was active in U.S. national politics but resigned from Congress in January 1861. He wrote the Mississippi Secession Ordinance and served in the Civil War as a cavalry officer. Lamar became a Congressman again in 1872 and later became Secretary of the Interior and then a justice of the Supreme Court. He opposed civil rights legislation, promoted industrial progress, and "symbolized the South's regained political respectability."

== Origins ==
The house was built by Lucius and Virginia Lamar in 1869 and was owned by Lucius Lamar up until around 1888. While the house was the Lamar family's official residence as he expanded his law practice in Oxford, Mississippi, it later became his retreat when he was in the U.S. House of Representatives. Lamar passed ownership of the house to his oldest daughter, Fannie L. Mayes, in 1888. Over time, the house became neglected and started deteriorating. The house was listed on the National Register of Historic Places and further was declared a National Historic Landmark in 1975.

== Restoration ==
In the year 2000, the Lamar House was included in the Mississippi Heritage Trust's "Ten Most Endangered List" for its "demolition by neglect". In an effort to save the house, the Oxford-Lafayette County Heritage Foundation bought the house in 2004 for $425,000 with funds provided by the Mississippi Legislature. Later that year, it was named both a Mississippi and an Oxford landmark; three years later, restoration began on Lamar House. The total cost of this renovation amounted to $1.5 million which began in May 2007 and concluded in June, 2008. Aspects of this renovation included clearing the three acre lot of invasive plant species, replacing the foundation and roof of the house, and restoring the house's interior (including the hand painted frescoes in the main hallway). The restoration of the Lamar House was championed by the late Bill Russell who, as a member of the Oxford-Lafayette County Heritage Foundation, advocated for and oversaw much of the restoration process.

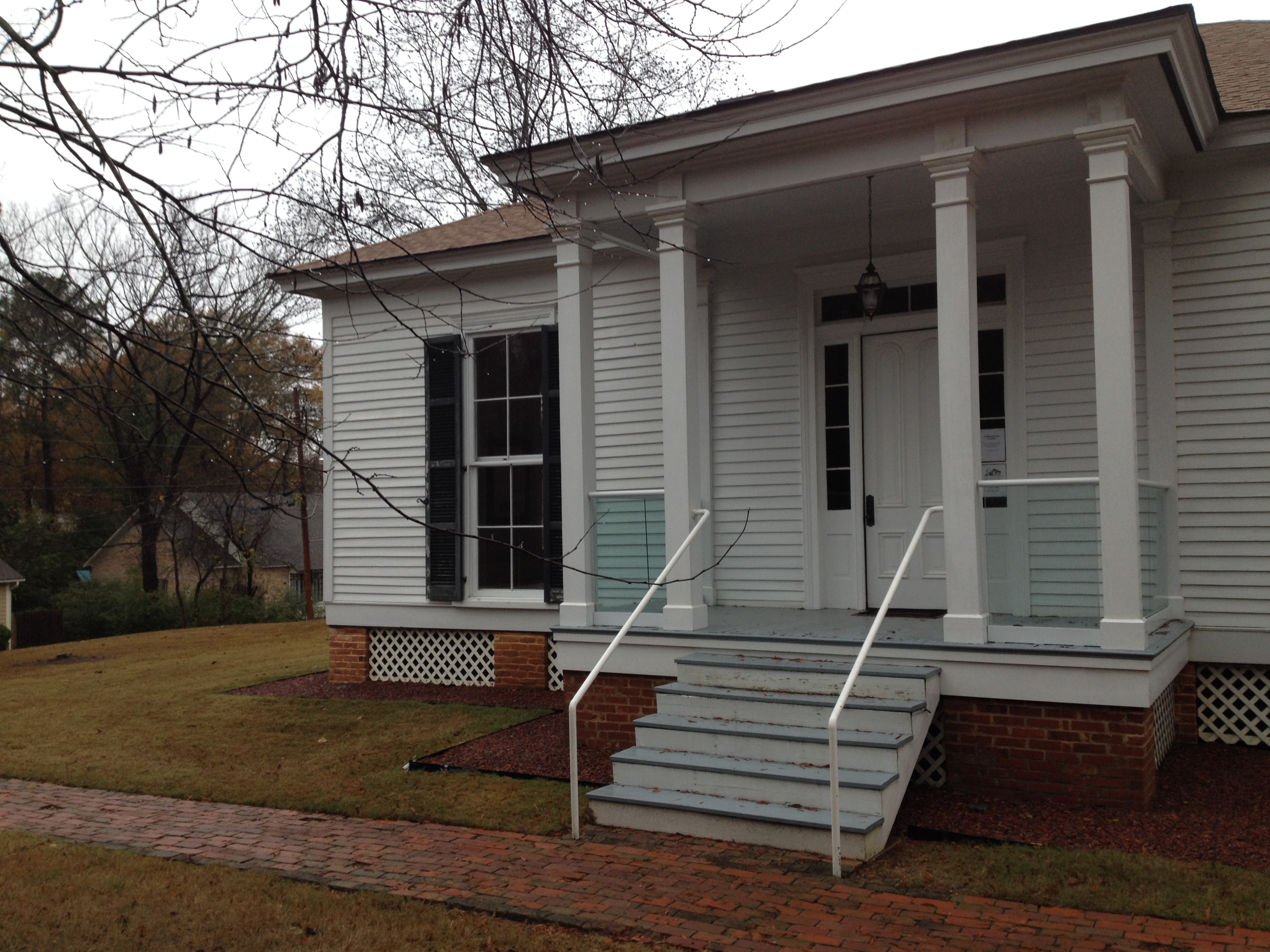
Lucius Q. C. Lamar House, 2015

== See also ==
- List of National Historic Landmarks in Mississippi
- National Register of Historic Places listings in Lafayette County, Mississippi
