= Sarah McGehee Isom =

Orator, and the first female faculty member at the University of Mississippi

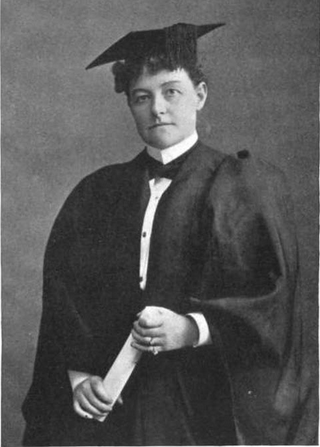
Sarah McGehee Isom, in a 1900 publication.

Sarah McGehee Isom (1854 – April 29, 1905) was an American orator, and the first female faculty member at the University of Mississippi, where she taught oratory for twenty years. (Her middle named is sometimes found as "McGhee" or "McGee" in sources.)

== Early life ==
Sarah Isom was born in Oxford, Mississippi, daughter of Thomas Dudley Isom and Sarah Royster McGehee Isom. Her father was a medical doctor; the family's home at Isom Place in Oxford is listed in the National Register of Historic Places. Isom attended Augusta Seminary in Virginia, and pursued further studies at the National School of Elocution and Oratory, Philadelphia, and in Boston.

== Career ==
Isom was hired to teach oratory at the University of Mississippi in 1885. She was the first woman hired to the faculty there, and the first woman on the faculty of any co-educational college in the southeastern United States. She designed the curriculum for oratory at Mississippi. She directed a Shakespeare festival at the university in 1897. She also performed as a dramatic reader. In her lifetime, a fellow Southern academic noted, "No one has contributed more to the growth of elocution in the South than Miss Isom."

Isom also owned property in Victor Heights, Los Angeles, California, which was subject to a legal dispute over oil rights. Isom won a $120,000 settlement in 1901 for the damages done by Rex Crude Oil Company. However, the award was appealed and still in the courts when Isom died in 1905.

== Personal life and legacy ==
Sarah McGehee Isom died in 1905, aged 51 years.

A dormitory at University of Mississippi was named for Isom in 1929. In 1981, the University of Mississippi established the Sarah Isom Center for Women and Gender Studies, named in her memory.
