= Oxford Courthouse Square Historic District =

Historic district in Mississippi, United States

- U.S. National Register of Historic Places
- U.S. Historic district
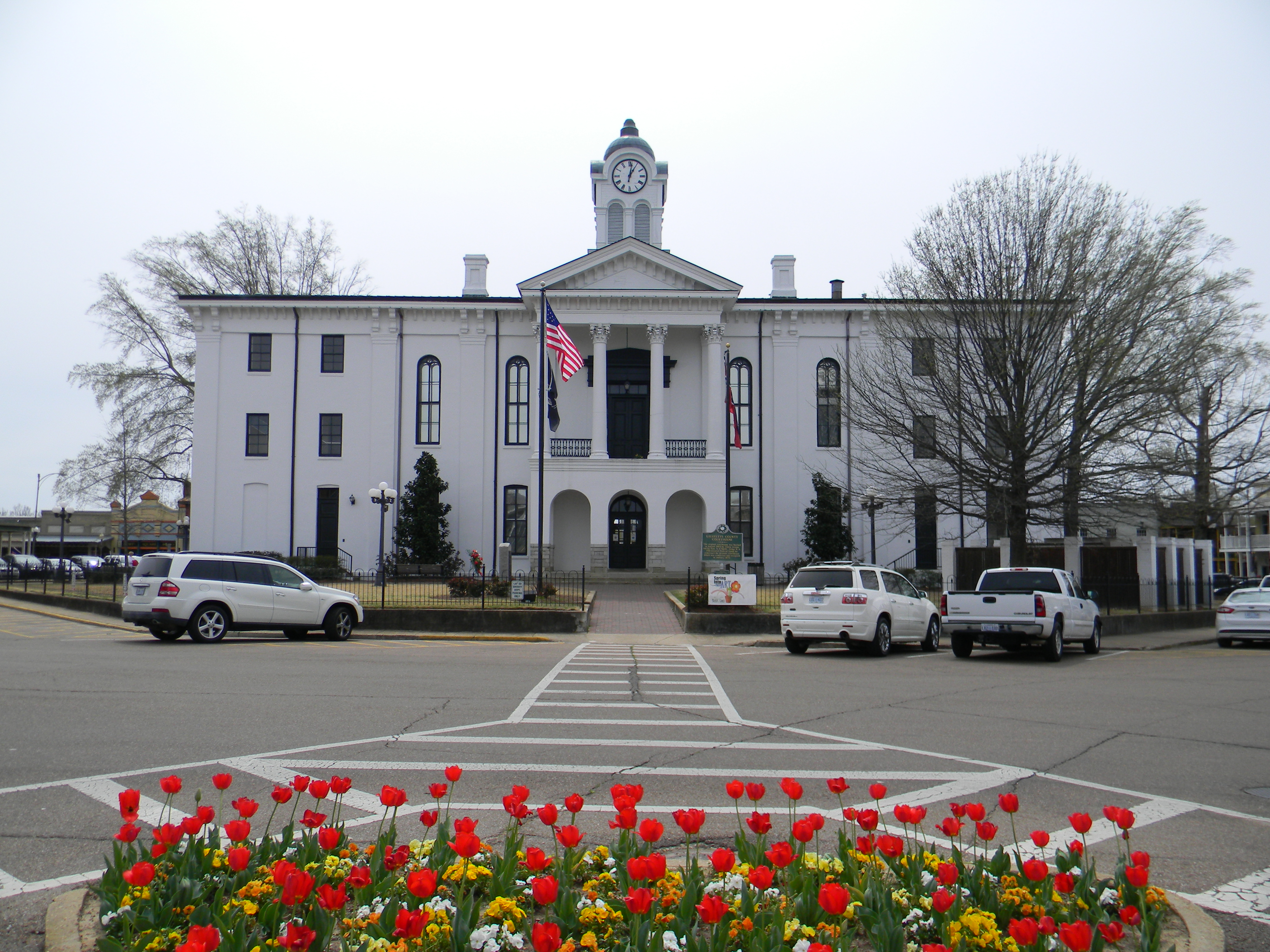
- The Lafayette County Courthouse, which is in the center of the district.

- Location within Mississippi
- Location: South Lamar Boulevard, Jackson and Van Buren Aves.
- Coordinates: 34°21′58″N 89°31′4″W
- NRHP reference No.: 80002257
- Added to NRHP: April 2, 1980

The Oxford Courthouse Square Historic District is a historic district located in Oxford, Mississippi, which is the county seat of Lafayette County. The district has existed since the city's incorporation in 1837, and was placed on the National Register of Historic Places on April 2, 1980. It serves as the cultural center of Oxford, which also contains the University of Mississippi. Several notable residents have lived in Oxford whose images contribute to the popular culture of the square, such as writer William Faulkner, whose works set in the Lafayette county-inspired Yoknapatawpha prominently feature the square. The current standing courthouse was constructed in 1871 after an original temporary one was destroyed by union troops during the American Civil War in 1864.

== Architecture ==
The architectural structure of the district is reflective of the city's existence during the American Civil War. Physically, it has retained two-story brick and stucco walled buildings that include balconies and cast-iron columns. The district serves as the commercial, political and cultural center of Oxford, and also includes several churches. Notable structures include the statues of William Faulkner at Oxford City Hall and a confederate memorial statue in front of the south-facing side of the courthouse.
