= Lucius Quintus Cincinnatus Lamar =

US Supreme Court justice from 1888 to 1893

Lucius Q. C. Lamar
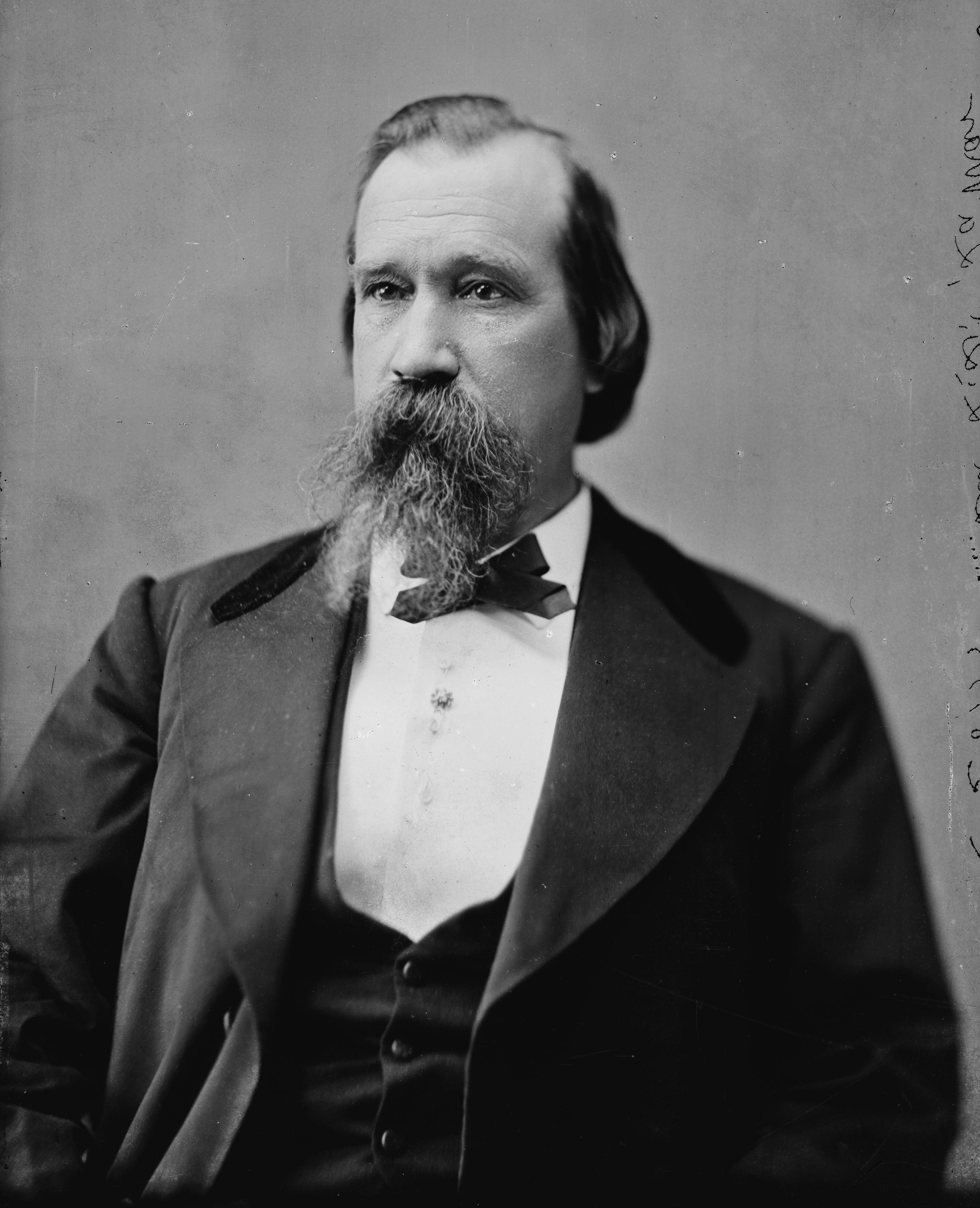
- Lamar, 1870–1880

Associate Justice of the Supreme Court of the United States
- In office January 18, 1888 – January 23, 1893
- Nominated by: Grover Cleveland
- Preceded by: William Burnham Woods
- Succeeded by: Howell E. Jackson

16th United States Secretary of the Interior
- In office March 6, 1885 – January 10, 1888
- President: Grover Cleveland
- Preceded by: Henry Teller
- Succeeded by: William Vilas

United States Senator from Mississippi
- In office March 4, 1877 – March 6, 1885
- Preceded by: James Alcorn
- Succeeded by: Edward Walthall

Chairman of the House Democratic Caucus
- In office March 4, 1875 – March 3, 1877
- Speaker: Michael C. Kerr (1875–1876); Samuel J. Randall (1876–1877)
- Preceded by: William E. Niblack
- Succeeded by: Hiester Clymer

Member of the U.S. House of Representatives from Mississippi's 1st district
- In office March 4, 1873 – March 3, 1877
- Preceded by: George Harris
- Succeeded by: Henry Muldrow
- In office March 4, 1857 – January 12, 1861
- Preceded by: Daniel Wright
- Succeeded by: George Harris (1870)

Member of the Georgia House of Representatives from Newton County
- In office November 7, 1853 – February 17, 1854 Serving with P. Reynolds

Personal details
- Born: September 17, 1825 Eatonton, Georgia, U.S.
- Died: January 23, 1893 (aged 67) Vineville, Georgia, U.S. (now Macon)
- Resting place: St. Peter's Cemetery, Oxford, Mississippi
- Party: Democratic
- Spouse: Virginia Longstreet (m. 1847; died 1884)
- Children: 4
- Parents: Lucius Quintus Cincinnatus Lamar I (father); Sarah Bird (mother)
- Education: Emory University (BA)

Military service
- Allegiance: Confederate States
- Branch: Army
- Years of service: 1861–1865
- Rank: Colonel
- Commands: 19th Mississippi Infantry Regiment
- Battles: American Civil War: Battle of Williamsburg

Lucius Quintus Cincinnatus Lamar II (September 17, 1825 – January 23, 1893) was an American politician, diplomat, and jurist and former Confederate soldier and official. A member of the Democratic Party, he represented Mississippi in both houses of Congress, served as the U.S. Secretary of the Interior under President Grover Cleveland, and was an associate justice of the Supreme Court of the United States.

Born and educated in Georgia, Lamar moved to Oxford, Mississippi, in 1849 to establish a legal practice. He was elected to the United States House of Representatives in 1856 and served until January 1861, when he helped draft Mississippi's Ordinance of Secession. He helped raise the 19th Mississippi Infantry Regiment and worked on the staff of his wife's cousin, General James Longstreet. In 1862, Confederate president Jefferson Davis appointed Lamar to the position of Special Confederate Commissioner to Russia. Following the Civil War, Lamar taught at the University of Mississippi and was a delegate to several state constitutional conventions.

Lamar returned to the United States House of Representatives in 1873, becoming the first Mississippi Democrat elected to the House since the end of the Civil War. He remained in the House until 1877, and represented Mississippi in the Senate from 1877 to 1885. He opposed Reconstruction and voting rights for African Americans. In 1885, he accepted appointment as Grover Cleveland's Secretary of the Interior. In 1888, the Senate confirmed Lamar's nomination to the Supreme Court, making Lamar the first Southerner appointed to the court since the Civil War. He remained on the court until his death in 1893.

== Family and education ==
Lamar was born on September 17, 1825, in Putnam County, Georgia, near Eatonton, at the family's 900-acre (3.6 km^{2}) plantation home known as "Fairfield". His parents were Lucius Quintus Cincinnatus Lamar and Sarah Bird; he had five siblings. His paternal grandparents were first cousins. The elder Lamar, a lawyer and state judge in Georgia, suffered from depression and committed suicide when Lamar was nine years old. Contemporary accounts explained the suicide as resulting from either insanity or severe dyspepsia. Several members of Lamar's family reached prominence in various levels of government. His uncle, Mirabeau Buonaparte Lamar, participated in the Texas Revolution and served as the second president of the Republic of Texas. He was a cousin to Associate Justices of the Supreme Court Joseph Rucker Lamar and John A. Campbell and was related to U.S. Representatives Absalom Harris Chappell and William Bailey Lamar.

Lamar was briefly educated in the Milledgeville school system before being enrolled at the Manual Labor School in Covington, Georgia, from 1837 to 1840. The school consolidated with Emory College (now known as Emory University) located in nearby Oxford, Georgia, in 1840, leading to Lamar's mother and one of his uncles moving to the town. Lamar was an average student, faring well in subjects he enjoyed and poorly in those he did not. Beyond his studies, he participated in campus debating activities, where he gained experience in public speaking and knowledge of important issues of the time such as slavery. He completed his studies in 1845.

At Emory, Lamar began a relationship with Virginia Longstreet, the daughter of Augustus Baldwin Longstreet, president of the college. The couple married in July 1847, and they had four children: L. Q. C. Lamar III, Virginia, Sarah, and Frances. On December 29, 1884, Virginia died from lung disease that had plagued her since 1880. They were married in the President's House at Emory College in Oxford—today the Dean's Residence at Oxford College of Emory University.

== Early career ==
=== Georgia lawyer and politician ===
In 1845, a few months before his twentieth birthday, Lamar moved to Macon, Georgia, where he studied law in his uncle's office for two years. He was admitted to the Georgia bar in 1847 in Vienna. Afterwards, Lamar moved back to Covington, where he set up his own legal practice. Using family connections associated with the Longstreet name, Lamar took his first steps into politics when Newton County sent him as a delegate to the state Democratic convention in Milledgeville in 1847 and 1849. When that convention discussed the Wilmot Proviso, Lamar embraced a staunch pro-slavery position that he never changed throughout the antebellum period. (Note: Indeed, the tax digest of Newton County for Lamar shows him owning multiple slaves.)

=== Mississippi lawyer, slaveowner and politician ===
Lamar moved to Oxford, Mississippi, in 1849 after A.B. Longstreet became president of the University of Mississippi. In June 1850, Lamar received a license to practice law in Mississippi, and in July, he became the university's assistant professor of mathematics. In the November, 1850 federal census, Lamar owned 14 slaves near Oxford (almost all women and girls) compared to Longstreet's 10 slaves (almost all adults). A decade later, after his brief return to Georgia described below, Lamar owned 31 slaves in Lafayette County, Mississippi, of whom 14 were female and 17 male, including 9 boys and 4 girls under 10.

Lamar's political career in Mississippi began in May 1850, when he addressed a Lafayette County convention on the topic of slavery. In March 1851, he helped organize a local branch of the Southern Rights Party in Oxford and soon became its delegate to the statewide party convention in Jackson. Lamar campaigned on behalf of party candidate Jefferson Davis for governor and was the party's spokesman in a debate in Oxford with Unionist opponent Henry Foote. Despite Lamar's efforts, Foote defeated Davis by 999 votes.

=== Return to Georgia as lawyer and legislator ===
Homesick and dissatisfied as a politician, in the summer of 1852, Lamar returned to Covington and entered into a legal partnership with a friend. Lamar reentered politics in Georgia by winning a seat in the Georgia House of Representatives as a member of the Democratic Party in Newton County, which had typically favored Whig candidates. Lamar became chairman of the Committee on the State of the Republic and also served on the Agriculture and Internal Improvements, Judiciary, and Public Printing committees, as well as on two special committees. Throughout the 1853–1854 term, he focused on issues dealing with the Western and Atlantic Railroad, party politics and slavery.

In February 1854, after the legislative term ended, Lamar moved to Macon to open a law office. With support from former congressman A. H. Chappell, Lamar sought the Democratic nomination in 1855 for Georgia's 3rd congressional district but failed to gather enough votes at the convention to become his party's candidate.

=== Return to Mississippi and Congressman (1857–1860) ===
After losing that Georgia congressional campaign, and facing financial troubles as well as family responsibilities, Lamar left Georgia for the final time and returned to Lafayette County, Mississippi. Along the Tallahatchie River north of Abbeville, Lamar established his 1,000 acres (4.0 km^{2}) "Solitude" cotton plantation that by 1857 had 26 slaves, though the plantation was never fully developed. Lamar also practiced law in nearby Holly Springs with two local prominent lawyers, C. M. Mott and James L. Autrey.

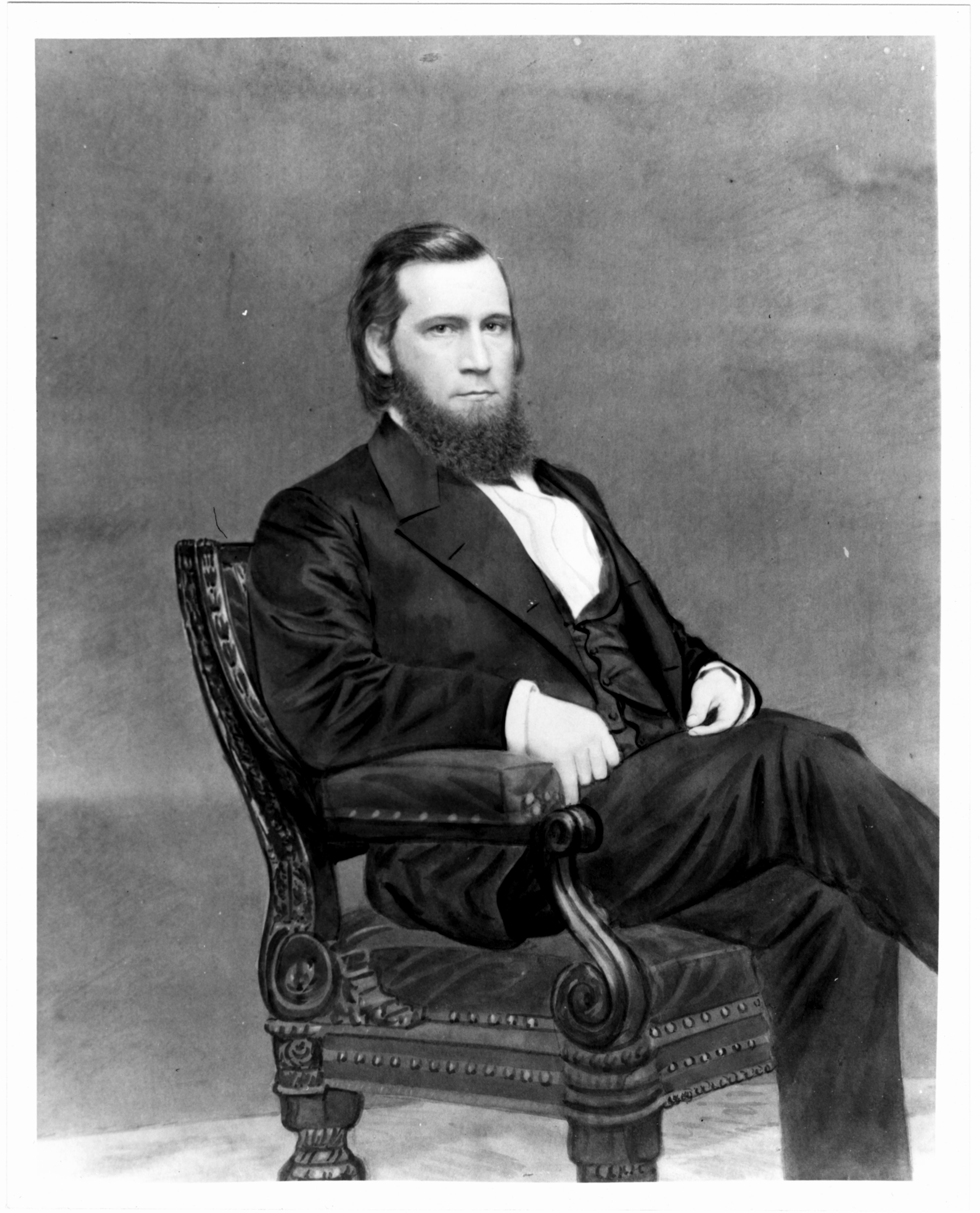
Portrait of L.Q.C. Lamar (c. 1850–1860)

In 1857, Democratic Congressman Daniel Wright decided not to seek reelection in Mississippi's 1st congressional district. The Memphis Daily Appeal suggested Lamar as a possible candidate under the Democratic ticket, though he faced difficulties due to his prior support of Howell Cobb, a leader of the Union movement. Nevertheless, at this convention, after numerous indecisive ballots, Mississippi Democrats made Lamar their candidate, and Lamar credited his old friend Jacob Thompson for the win. Lamar campaigned against Whig opponent, James Lusk Alcorn by stressing his strong support of the Kansas-Nebraska bill, and won by a comfortable margin, then two years later faced no opponent and thus easily won reelection.

Lamar's antebellum congressional career primarily focused on sectionalist issues, especially protecting Southern interests in slavery. Lamar supported the proslavery Lecompton Constitution in Kansas without popular ratification, which was the subject of a debate on the House floor on the morning of February 6, 1858. When a South Carolina congressman attacked a Pennsylvania Republican congressman, a brawl ensued, with Lamar attacking Illinois congressman (and Congregational minister) Owen Lovejoy, who had become a prominent abolitionist after a pro-slavery mob killed his brother. Lamar supported the compromise English Bill created by southerners and President Buchanan. Lamar again defended slavery as an institution verbally in an 1860 speech, during which he argued that not everyone is equal. While Lamar never directly advocated for secession, he mentioned it as possible if the South lost the ability to check the majority abolitionist opinion in the government.

After the victory of Republican candidate Abraham Lincoln in the November 1860 presidential election was clear, Lamar left Washington on December 12, 1860, to canvass for a seat in the upcoming Mississippi secession convention. On January 12, 1861, Lamar resigned from Congress, as did all other members of the Mississippi delegation.

== Secession ==
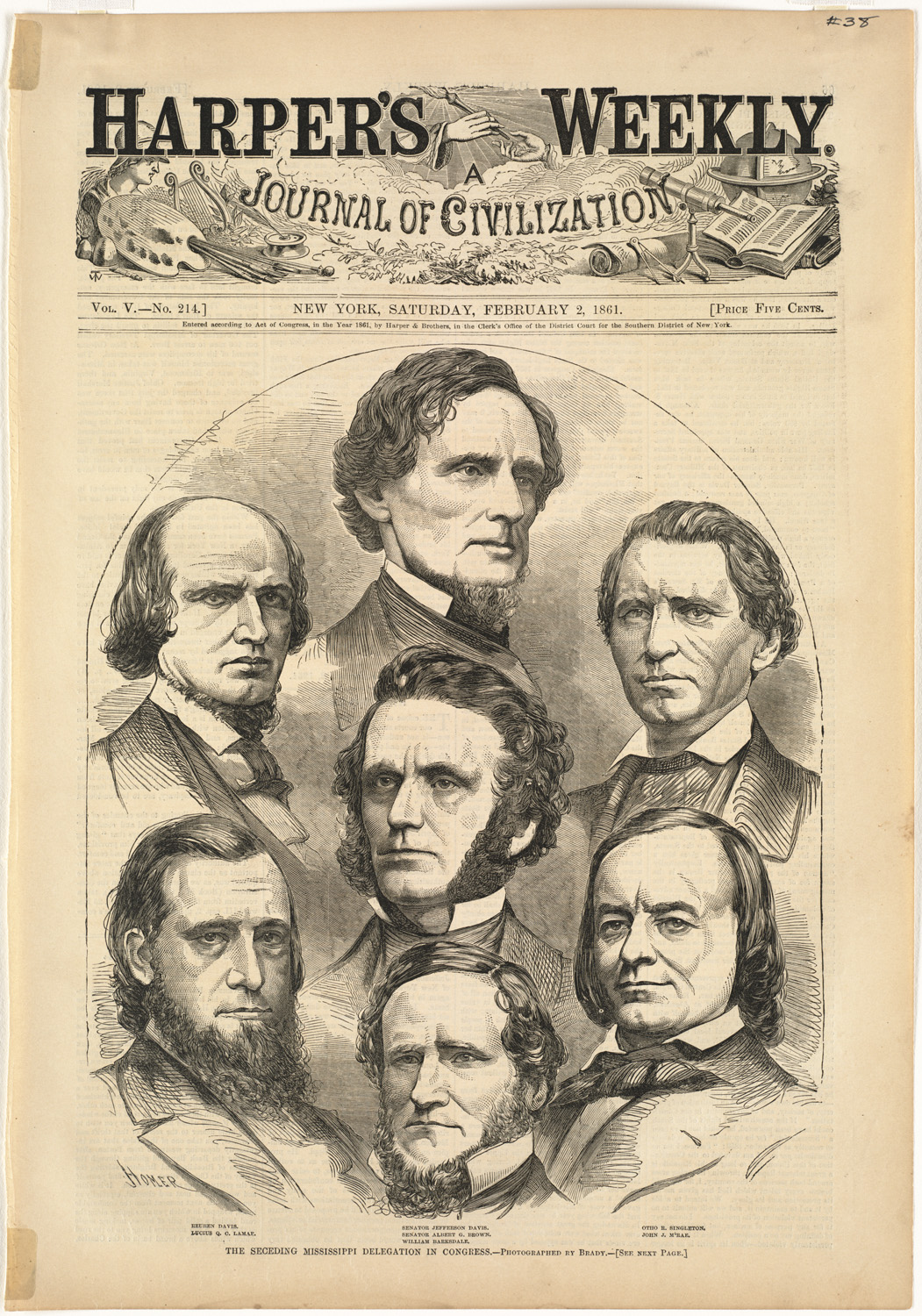
A page from Harper's Weekly showing the seceding Mississippi Delegation; Lamar is bottom-left.

Lamar travelled to Charleston to participate in the 1860 Democratic Convention as an emissary for Jefferson Davis's message to focus on defeating northern Democrat Stephen Douglas instead of withdrawing from the convention; however, this appeal had little effect on the Mississippi delegation who had already left the convention hall. He later spoke to a large group of southern sympathizers, denouncing Douglas and stating that the Democratic party had irremediably split. He worked with Davis to convince Mississippi's delegates to attend the reconvened national convention in Baltimore. The Mississippi delegates attended, though would later withdraw with other southern delegates because of discontent with the northern Democrat's moderate position on slavery; the southern Democrats would instead nominate John C. Breckinridge for the presidency at their own convention. Following the conventions, Lamar accepted a professorship of mental and moral philosophy at the University of Mississippi and planned to retire from Congress at the session's end.

With the victory of Abraham Lincoln, Mississippi Governor John J. Pettus convened the state's congressional delegation to recommend a policy on secession. While Lamar and Senators Davis and Albert G. Brown favored a moderate approach, urging cooperative secession with other southern states, they were outvoted by the other congressional members; Lamar and the others joined the resolution to make it unanimous. A day after the governor's conference, he proposed a plan for the creation of a confederacy at a mass meeting in Brandon, Mississippi, though it attracted little support by other southern leaders.

On January 7, 1861, Mississippi's secession convention organized, and Lamar was sent as a delegate from Lafayette County. Lamar swiftly moved to establish a committee to prepare an Ordinance of Secession, and by the next day, he was appointed chairman of it. On January 9, the committee presented the Mississippi Secession Ordinance which Lamar had authored prior to the convention; by a vote of 70 to 29, the document passed. On January 10, Lamar was appointed to the Committee on Southern Confederacy, where he introduced resolutions sympathetic to South Carolina's secession and to accept an initiation to meet with other seceding states to form a confederacy. Lamar also worked on a committee to draft a declaration of causes. When the convention reconvened on March 29, 1861, he voted to pass the Provisional Constitution of the Confederate States.

== Role in the Confederacy ==
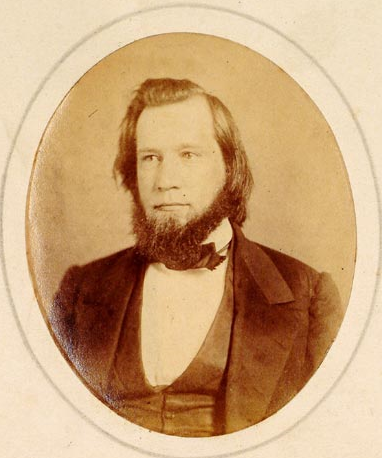
Portrait of Lamar in 1861 when he was a professor at the University of Mississippi

During the months preceding the Civil War, he continued teaching students at the University of Mississippi, though by June 1861, the university suspended operations because of too few students. Lamar entered active service as a lieutenant colonel in the Confederate army, where he and his law partner C. H. Mott organized the 19th Mississippi Regiment of volunteers in Oxford. The regiment registered to the Confederate War Department on May 14, 1861, and subsequently left for Richmond. Mott was commissioned as a colonel with Lamar as a lieutenant colonel. While in Richmond, Lamar gave a closing address to an event headed by Jefferson Davis, where he proclaimed:

"This very night I look forward to the day when this beloved country of ours— for, thank God! we have a country at last— will be a country to live for, to pray for, to fight for, and if necessary, to die for."

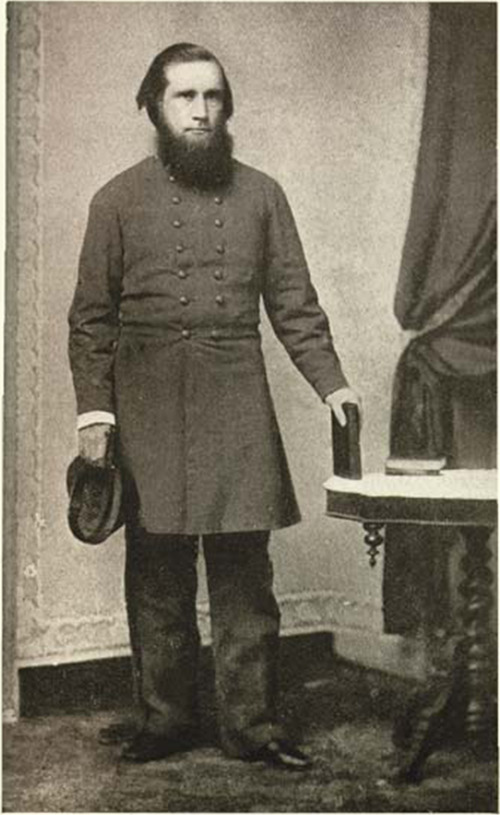
Lamar in 1862 while in the Confederate Army

Before his regiment moved to the front, Lamar suffered vertigo, forcing him to return to Oxford to recover in mid-July 1861. He returned to Richmond in November, and once there he acted as an adviser for Davis, in which he assisted him with an attempt to mend relations with General Joseph Johnston. His unit participated in the Battle of Williamsburg, where Mott was killed in action. Lamar assumed control of the regiment and was praised for his leadership. While preparing for another engagement, Lamar suffered a violent seizure, forcing him to quit combat and head to Richmond to recover. At the same time, Lamar was facing personal issues with his younger brother and his cousin dying in combat. Seeking spiritual help, he joined the Methodist Church in July.

Following improvements to his health, on November 19, 1862, he returned to service, with Davis appointing him as a diplomat to the Russian Imperial Government. He reached Europe on March 1, 1863, though he was eventually given advice by Emperor Napoleon III that a mission to Russia would be fruitless. Lamar assisted other Confederate officials in France and England, though he failed to convince audiences in either country to recognize the Confederacy. He received a letter from the Secretary of State Judah Benjamin that the Confederate Senate had refused to confirm him as commissioner to Russia. (Note: According to Benjamin, the refusal to confirm him resulted from a backlash to the aloofness of European nations to the Confederacy.) After receiving the letter, Lamar spent several more months in Europe before leaving on November 1, 1863, from Liverpool. He arrived in Richmond in early January 1864. With his return home, Lamar spent much of the last year of the war giving speeches on Davis' behalf.

On December 3, 1864, he was commissioned as a colonel in the Confederate Army with duty as a judge advocate in Richmond. He acted as an aide to General James Longstreet at the time of the Confederacy's surrender in 1865. He was paroled and released after his surrender.

== Post-war period ==
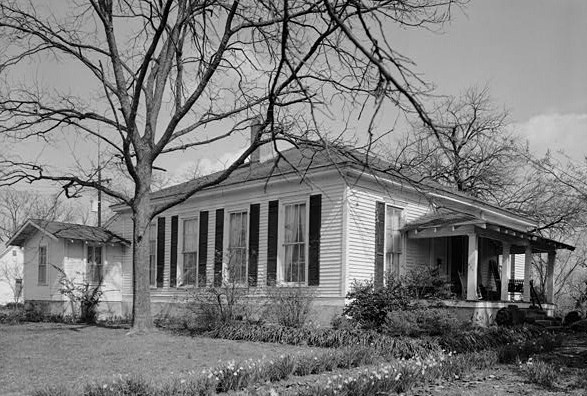
L. Q. C. Lamar House, built between 1869 and 1870 in Oxford, Mississippi, by Lamar

After the war, Lamar returned to Oxford to reunite with his family. The war had claimed two brothers and both of his law partners. Lamar's plantation had suffered damage and had its slaves freed; the land was also returned to his father-in-law as he could not maintain payments during the war. Lamar entered into a law partnership with his friend Edward C. Walthall in the Coffeeville hamlet. The successful practice was dissolved following health troubles, leading Lamar to accept a less-demanding professorship position at the University of Mississippi for the fall term of 1866. He taught ethics and metaphysics initially, though by 1867, he was the chair of the law department. He became a member of the Sigma Alpha Epsilon fraternity in 1865 and was among the first initiates in that fraternity's chapter at the University of Mississippi. He became a director of the Mississippi Central Railroad Company in 1867 and entered into a law partnership with E. D. Clark in Oxford in the fall of 1868. From 1868 to 1872, he provided legal services for the railroad company, but by 1877, he had lost his stake when it was absorbed by the Illinois Central Railroad. In 1870, he resigned from his professorship, fearing radicalization of the university and the possibility of admitting Black students after a new governing board was installed.

Lamar had developed a reputation during the 1870s and 1880s as a leading contributor to the Democratic Party's opposition to the predominantly Republican African-American officeholders in Mississippi. Lamar's testimony before the 42nd United States Congress's Joint Committee to Inquire into the Conditions of Affairs in the Late Insurrectionary States reveals that he was a passionate defender of the Southern social order and the Ku Klux Klan, a secret society which had developed in response to the Thirteenth and Fourteenth amendments and the events of Reconstruction. On June 21, 1871, several witnesses testified before the committee that Lamar, as a defense attorney in federal court in Oxford, Mississippi, objected to a witness who could identify 27 men appearing on charges for organizing the Klan and terrorizing African Americans, missionary society teachers, and Republican voters. When the witness entered the courtroom, Lamar objected to his presence, then threw a chair at the witness, and "cussed the judge, the court and all of its officers, and the United States federal government", as students of the University of Mississippi cheered from the gallery, then punched a federal marshal who moved to defend the witness. The presiding judge, Samuel J. Gholson, revoked Lamar's law license, but only temporarily. He was allowed to continue practicing law after a three-month suspension from the bar.

In 1868, Lamar purchased 30 acres (0.12 km^{2}) in Oxford and built a six-room cottage between 1869 and 1870. The house is now known as the L. Q. C. Lamar House Museum and was designated a National Historic Landmark in 1975. The house operates as a museum and the 3-acre grounds as a park.

== Congressional career (1873–1885) ==
Lamar returned to the U.S. House of Representatives in 1873, the first Democrat from Mississippi to be elected to the House since the Civil War. He served there until 1877.

=== United States Senate (1877–1885) ===
Lamar was elected to the United States Senate by the Mississippi legislature in 1876, succeeding Republican James L. Alcorn. He took his seat on March 4, 1877, becoming the first former high-ranking Confederate official to serve in the Senate.

While Lamar was a staunch opponent of Reconstruction, and did not consider freedmen and other black Americans fit to vote, promoting "the supremacy of the unconquered and unconquerable Saxon race", his election followed his growing national prominence as a supporter of reconciliation between the North and South. In 1874, while serving in the House of Representatives, Lamar had delivered a widely publicized eulogy for Massachusetts Republican senator Charles Sumner, a prominent abolitionist and one of the principal architects of congressional Reconstruction. Sumner had been a particularly controversial figure in the South because of his uncompromising opposition to slavery and his advocacy of civil rights for formerly enslaved people. Lamar's tribute called upon Americans to overcome the bitterness of the Civil War and recognise their common national identity. The speech attracted considerable attention in Washington and throughout the country, helping establish Lamar's reputation as a Southern politician capable of appealing to Northern audiences.

==== The Compromise of 1877 ====
Lamar played an important role in the political negotiations surrounding the disputed presidential election of 1876. The election between Democrat Samuel J. Tilden and Republican Rutherford B. Hayes had produced competing claims over electoral votes in several states, threatening a constitutional and political crisis. Lamar supported the creation of the Electoral Commission, established by Congress in January 1877 to resolve the disputed electoral returns. The commission ultimately awarded the contested electoral votes to Hayes, who assumed the presidency.

Lamar's support for the settlement was controversial among Southern Democrats, many of whom believed that Tilden had been deprived of victory. The agreement also contributed to the withdrawal of remaining federal troops from the South and the effective conclusion of Reconstruction. Lamar believed that accepting the political settlement offered the best prospect of restoring national stability and reducing federal intervention in Southern affairs. His involvement demonstrated his willingness to support compromise even when it brought criticism from his own political supporters.

The end of Reconstruction, however, had significant consequences for African Americans in the South. The withdrawal of federal protection facilitated the consolidation of Democratic political power and the subsequent erosion of African-American political participation and civil rights. Although Lamar occasionally advocated interracial cooperation and acceptance of the constitutional amendments adopted after the Civil War, his political involvement in the restoration of Democratic rule in Mississippi was also part of the wider movement that undermined Reconstruction.

==== Monetary policy and the Bland–Allison Act ====
One of the most controversial episodes of Lamar's Senate career concerned the monetary debate over the remonetisation of silver. During the 1870s, agricultural states such as Mississippi experienced considerable economic hardship, and many farmers and debtors supported an expansion of the money supply. Advocates of silver coinage believed that increasing the availability of currency would ease indebtedness and improve agricultural prices.

In 1878, Congress considered the Bland–Allison Act, which required the federal government to purchase substantial quantities of silver bullion and coin it into standard silver dollars. The measure had strong support among Western and Southern Democrats, including many of Lamar's constituents in Mississippi. The Mississippi legislature had formally instructed him to support the expansion of silver coinage.

Lamar nevertheless opposed the measure, believing that its monetary provisions were economically unsound. In a speech before the Senate, he explained the difficulty of voting against the expressed wishes of his state legislature but maintained that his understanding of the economic consequences required him to do so. His position placed him at odds with much of the Southern Democratic establishment and attracted particular criticism from Mississippi politicians and former Confederate president Jefferson Davis.

The reaction in Mississippi was sufficiently hostile that Lamar undertook a statewide speaking tour to defend his position. He addressed large audiences and argued that a senator's responsibility sometimes required him to exercise independent judgement rather than simply follow instructions from constituents or the state legislature. Although the controversy threatened his political standing, he eventually retained considerable support in Mississippi. His opposition to the silver legislation later became one of the episodes highlighted in John F. Kennedy's book Profiles in Courage (1956).

==== Economic policy and public questions ====
Lamar also participated in Senate debates concerning federal economic policy, transportation and public expenditure. He was particularly interested in railroad development and the relationship between federal policy and the economic recovery of the Southern states. In May 1878, he delivered a Senate speech on the proposed Texas and Pacific Railroad, addressing the question of federal involvement in the development of transcontinental railway infrastructure.

He also spoke on the payment of government bonds in January 1878, reflecting the wider national debate over the currency, public debt and the financial policies adopted following the Civil War.

Lamar was also a supporter of federal assistance for public education. He argued that national educational legislation could contribute to resolving racial and social divisions in the South, although his approach to racial equality remained was typical of the era, rooted in the supposed racial supremacy of the White Anglo Saxon Protestant. His support for federal educational assistance distinguished him from many Southern Democrats who opposed federal involvement in education.

In February 1883, he delivered a substantial Senate speech on tariff policy, contributing to the contemporary debate over protective duties and the relationship between federal taxation and American industry.

==== African-American emigration and the Exoduster movement ====
On June 14, 1880, Lamar spoke in the Senate during a debate concerning the migration of thousands of African Americans from the South to Kansas and other Northern states, a movement commonly known as the Exoduster movement. The Senate had established a select committee to investigate the causes of the migration, following reports of political violence, racial intimidation, economic exploitation and other abuses against Black Southerners.

In his contribution to the debate, Lamar challenged the suggestion that racial oppression and economic hardship in the South were responsible for the migration. He characterised the movement as having been encouraged by political organisations and outside interests, and disputed the interpretation that Black migrants were fleeing intolerable conditions. He defended the Southern agricultural labour system, arguing that African-American workers generally enjoyed favourable employment conditions and were treated well by Southern employers. In support of his position, he quoted the observations of British parliamentarian Sir George Campbell, whose account of Southern race relations he presented as evidence of the comparatively favourable circumstances of emancipated Black people.

Lamar's speech reflected a paternalistic view of African Americans and their economic position. He attributed some of their financial difficulties to their own spending habits and lack of thrift, rather than to structural inequalities in the Southern labour system. He also described Southern employers as indulgent towards their workers, suggesting that the more demanding conditions migrants encountered in the North might develop qualities of perseverance and independence.

Although Lamar stated that African Americans should be free to migrate if doing so would improve their circumstances, he rejected the argument that the movement demonstrated widespread racial oppression in the South.

==== Committee leadership and final Senate term ====
During his Senate service, Lamar held important committee positions. He chaired the Committee on Interior and Insular Affairs and the Committee on Railroads during the Forty-sixth Congress (1879–1881). These appointments reflected his experience in public affairs and his continuing interest in the development of federal infrastructure and the administration of public lands.

Lamar was reelected to the Senate in 1883, securing another six-year term. However, his second term was cut short following the election of Grover Cleveland as president in 1884. Cleveland, seeking to assemble a Cabinet that represented different sections of the country and symbolised the restoration of national political unity, selected Lamar as Secretary of the Interior.

Lamar resigned from the Senate on March 6, 1885, to take up the Cabinet appointment. His departure ended eight years of Senate service during which he had become one of the most prominent Southern Democratic politicians of the post-Civil War era.

== Later career ==
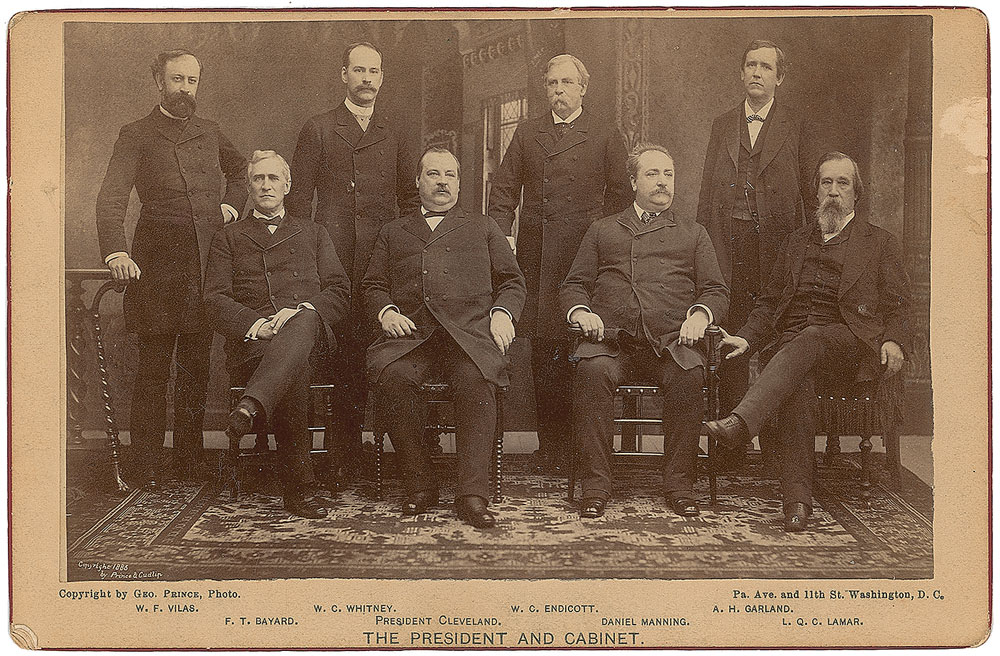
President Grover Cleveland and his first Cabinet, with L.Q.C. Lamar in the rightmost, bottom spot

=== Secretary of the Interior (1885–1888) ===
With the victory of Grover Cleveland in the 1884 presidential election, Lamar recommended several southerners for his cabinet. Despite the recommendations, Cleveland decided to nominate Lamar for Secretary of the Interior. The two shared similar views on many issues, and Lamar provided geographical balance to Cleveland's cabinet. While questions were raised over his involvement in the Confederacy and limited administrative experience, he was confirmed with little difficulty. As part of the first Democratic administration in 24 years, he was beseeched by members of his own party, especially those from the South, seeking political patronage. He engaged these requests, dismissing Republican officials for Democratic ones, though he did so cautiously.

As secretary, he reduced the department's fleet of carriages for high officials, as well as opposed efforts to dissolve Indian reservations. He forwarded a new Indian policy, encouraging citizenship and individual land-holding; he endorsed the Dawes Act of 1887. He favored conservationism with public lands to reduce threats of exploitation. He was a staunch defender of the Homestead Act of 1862, as he claimed it prevented mass exploitation of natural resources. Lamar also worked to reclaim over 45,000,000 acres (180,000 km^{2}), mostly from railroad corporations.

He served from March 6, 1885, to January 10, 1888.

=== Supreme Court (1888–1893) ===
Senate vote on the Lamar nomination
January 16, 1888	Party			Total votes
January 16, 1888	Democratic	Republican	Readjuster	Total votes
Yea	29	2	1	32
Nay	0	28	0	28
Result: Confirmed
Roll call vote: Senator / Party / State / Vote; Nelson W. Aldrich / R / Rhode Island / Nay; William B. Allison / R / Iowa / Nay; William B. Bate / D / Tennessee / Yea; James B. Beck / D / Kentucky / Yea; James H. Berry / D / Arkansas / Yea; J. C. S. Blackburn / D / Kentucky / Not Voting; Henry W. Blair / R / New Hampshire / Nay; Rufus Blodgett / D / New Jersey / Yea; Thomas M. Bowen / R / Colorado / Nay; Joseph E. Brown / D / Georgia / Yea; Matthew Butler / D / South Carolina / Yea; Wilkinson Call / D / Florida / Yea; J. Donald Cameron / R / Pennsylvania / Nay; Jonathan Chace / R / Rhode Island / Nay; William E. Chandler / R / New Hampshire / Not Voting; Francis Cockrell / D / Missouri / Yea; Richard Coke / D / Texas / Yea; Alfred H. Colquitt / D / Georgia / Yea; Shelby M. Cullom / R / Illinois / Nay; John W. Daniel / D / Virginia / Yea; Cushman K. Davis / R / Minnesota / Nay; Henry L. Dawes / R / Massachusetts / Nay; Joseph N. Dolph / R / Oregon / Nay; George F. Edmunds / R / Vermont / Nay; James B. Eustis / D / Louisiana / Not Voting; William M. Evarts / R / New York / Nay; Charles B. Farwell / R / Illinois / Nay; Charles James Faulkner / D / West Virginia / Yea; William P. Frye / R / Maine / Nay; James Z. George / D / Mississippi / Yea; Randall L. Gibson / D / Louisiana / Not Voting; Arthur P. Gorman / D / Maryland / Yea; George Gray / D / Delaware / Yea; Eugene Hale / R / Maine / Nay; Wade Hampton III / D / South Carolina / Yea; Isham G. Harris / D / Tennessee / Yea; Joseph R. Hawley / R / Connecticut / Nay; George Hearst / D / California / Not Voting; Frank Hiscock / R / New York / Nay; George F. Hoar / R / Massachusetts / Nay; John J. Ingalls / R / Kansas / Nay; James K. Jones / D / Arkansas / Yea; John P. Jones / R / Nevada / Not Voting; John E. Kenna / D / West Virginia / Not Voting; Charles F. Manderson / R / Nebraska / Not Voting; John R. McPherson / D / New Jersey / Yea; John H. Mitchell / R / Oregon / Nay; John T. Morgan / D / Alabama / Yea; Justin S. Morrill / R / Vermont / Not Voting; Algernon Paddock / R / Nebraska / Nay; Thomas W. Palmer / R / Michigan / Nay; Samuel Pasco / D / Florida / Not Voting; Henry B. Payne / D / Ohio / Not Voting; Orville H. Platt / R / Connecticut / Nay; Preston B. Plumb / R / Kansas / Nay; James L. Pugh / D / Alabama / Yea; Matthew Quay / R / Pennsylvania / Nay; Matt W. Ransom / D / North Carolina / Not Voting; John H. Reagan / D / Texas / Yea; Harrison H. Riddleberger / RA / Virginia / Yea; Dwight M. Sabin / R / Minnesota / Not Voting; Eli Saulsbury / D / Delaware / Yea; Philetus Sawyer / R / Wisconsin / Not Voting; John Sherman / R / Ohio / Nay; John Coit Spooner / R / Wisconsin / Nay; Leland Stanford / R / California / Yea; William M. Stewart / R / Nevada / Yea; Francis B. Stockbridge / R / Michigan / Nay; Henry M. Teller / R / Colorado / Not Voting; David Turpie / D / Indiana / Yea; Zebulon Vance / D / North Carolina / Yea; George Graham Vest / D / Missouri / Yea; Daniel W. Voorhees / D / Indiana / Yea; Edward C. Walthall / D / Mississippi / Yea; James F. Wilson / R / Iowa / Not Voting; Ephraim K. Wilson II / D / Maryland / Yea

In May 1887, Republican Justice William B. Woods died while in office, and following the reconvening of Congress, Lamar was nominated by Cleveland on December 12, 1887, without serious competition. Lamar was from the South just like the deceased justice, and he would be the first Southerner nominated to the court since the Civil War. As a result, Lamar's nomination "symbolized the road to reconciliation." President Cleveland informed Lamar on August 17, 1887 that he was considering nominating him.

The Republican-dominated Senate Judiciary Committee reported against his nomination because of lack of legal experience and old age; he was the second oldest nominee ever at the time. Thanks to the votes of a few western Republicans breaking from party leadership, Lamar was confirmed on January 16, 1888, by a close 32 to 28 vote. He took the judicial oath on January 18, 1888.

Lamar's time on the court was spent briefly under the Waite Court, with the rest under the Fuller Court. His service on the court is considered by some as unremarkable, though to others, the quality of his opinions he produced improved as his time on the court went on. Throughout his tenure, he authored 96 opinions, with him issuing 13 dissents from the court; overall, his opinions did not receive much opposition from other members of the court, with generating only four dissents.

== Death and legacy ==
Lamar died on January 23, 1893, in Vineville, Georgia. He was originally interred at Riverside Cemetery in Macon, Georgia, but was reinterred at St. Peter's Cemetery in Oxford, Mississippi, in 1894.

Lamar was later featured in John F. Kennedy's Pulitzer Prize–winning book, Profiles in Courage (1957), for his eulogy for Massachusetts Senator Charles Sumner (R) in 1874, along with his support of the findings of a partisan congressional committee regarding the disputed presidential election of 1876, and for his unpopular vote against the Bland–Allison Act of 1878.

== Memorials and namesakes ==
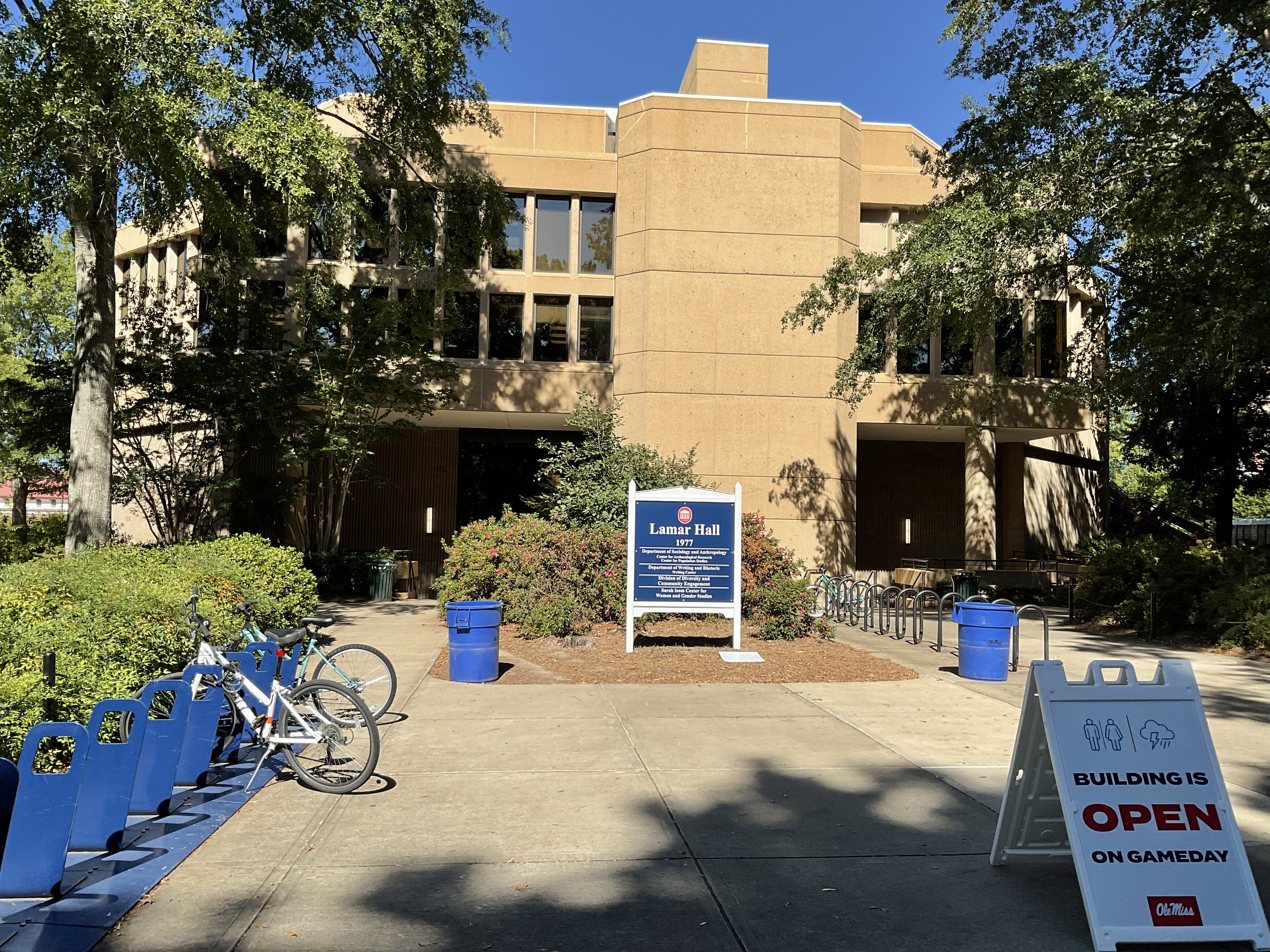
Lamar Hall at the University of Mississippi

A variety of places have been named in Lamar's honor, including three U.S. counties: Lamar County, Alabama; Lamar County, Georgia; and Lamar County, Mississippi. Several communities are named for him, including ones in Arkansas, Wisconsin, Nebraska, Colorado, Mississippi, and Missouri. In Oxford, Mississippi, a building on the University of Mississippi's campus, Lamar Hall, and the main thoroughfare for the town, Lamar Avenue, are named for him. A road in Memphis is also named for him. The Lamar School in Meridian, MS, a former segregation academy, is named for L.Q.C. Lamar. (Note: Other schools include the high schools in the communities named for him, such as Lamar High School, Arkansas, and Lamar High School, Missouri. Other places bear the Lamar namesake for the county they are located in, such as Lamar Municipal Airport, Colorado)

The east fork of the Yellowstone River in Yellowstone National Park is called the Lamar River, coined by geologist Arnold Hague during an 1884–85 Geological Survey. Similarly, Lamar Valley, and other park places are named in honor of Lamar as Secretary of the Interior. In Hot Springs National Park, the Lamar Bathhouse is named for him. During World War II, the Liberty Ship SS Lucius Q. C. Lamar was named for him.

Emory University had two named professorships in the School of Law that were named for Lamar. In April 2022, Emory removed Lamar's name from the professorships after a review by Emory's Committee on Naming Honors recommended that the name be changed due to his staunch defense of slavery.

== Notes ==
U.S. House of Representatives
Preceded by Daniel Wright	Member from Mississippi's 1st congressional district 1857–1861	Vacant Title next held by George Harris
Preceded by George Harris	Member of the U.S. House of Representatives from Mississippi's 1st congressional district 1873–1877	Succeeded by Henry Muldrow
Preceded by Philetus Sawyer	Chair of the House Pacific Railroads Committee; 1875–1877	Succeeded by James Throckmorton
Party political offices
Preceded by William Niblack	Chair of the House Democratic Caucus; 1875–1877	Succeeded by Hiester Clymer
U.S. Senate
Preceded by James Alcorn	U.S. senator (Class 2) from Mississippi; 1877–1885; Served alongside: Blanche Bruce, James George	Succeeded by Edward Walthall
Preceded by Richard J. Oglesby	Chair of the Senate Interior Committee; 1879–1880	Succeeded by Joseph E. McDonald
Preceded by Matt Ransom	Chair of the Senate Railroads Committee; 1880–1881	Succeeded by William Kellogg
Political offices
Preceded by Henry Teller	United States Secretary of the Interior; 1885–1888	Succeeded by William Vilas
Legal offices
Preceded by William Woods	Associate Justice of the Supreme Court of the United States; 1888–1893	Succeeded by Howell Jackson
