= Isom Place =

Historic house in Mississippi, United States

- U.S. National Register of Historic Places
- Location within Mississippi Location within the United States
- Location: 1003 Jefferson Ave., Oxford, Mississippi
- Coordinates: 34°22′9″N 89°31′10″W
- Area: less than one acre
- Built: 1835
- NRHP reference No.: 80002256
- Added to NRHP: April 2, 1980

Isom Place is located at 1003 Jefferson Avenue in Oxford, Mississippi and listed on the National Register of Historic Places. The home was constructed by Thomas Dudley Isom, a physician in Lafayette County. The exact dates of construction are lost, due in part to a lack of records from 1865 to 1883. The earliest version of the structure was a two or three bedroom cabin, but by 1840 Isom used the cabin as a core for the current home.

At the age of thirty in 1856 Isom married Sarah McGehee of Abbeville, South Carolina. Lore reports that McGehee brought a shoot of a magnolia tree from South Carolina and planted it in the front yard of Isom Place; it is not known if the tree remains standing. Their daughter, Sarah McGehee Isom, would be born in the 1850s in this house and become the first female faculty member at the nearby University of Mississippi and the first female faculty member at a coeducational institution of higher education in the Southeast United States.

.

== Gallery ==
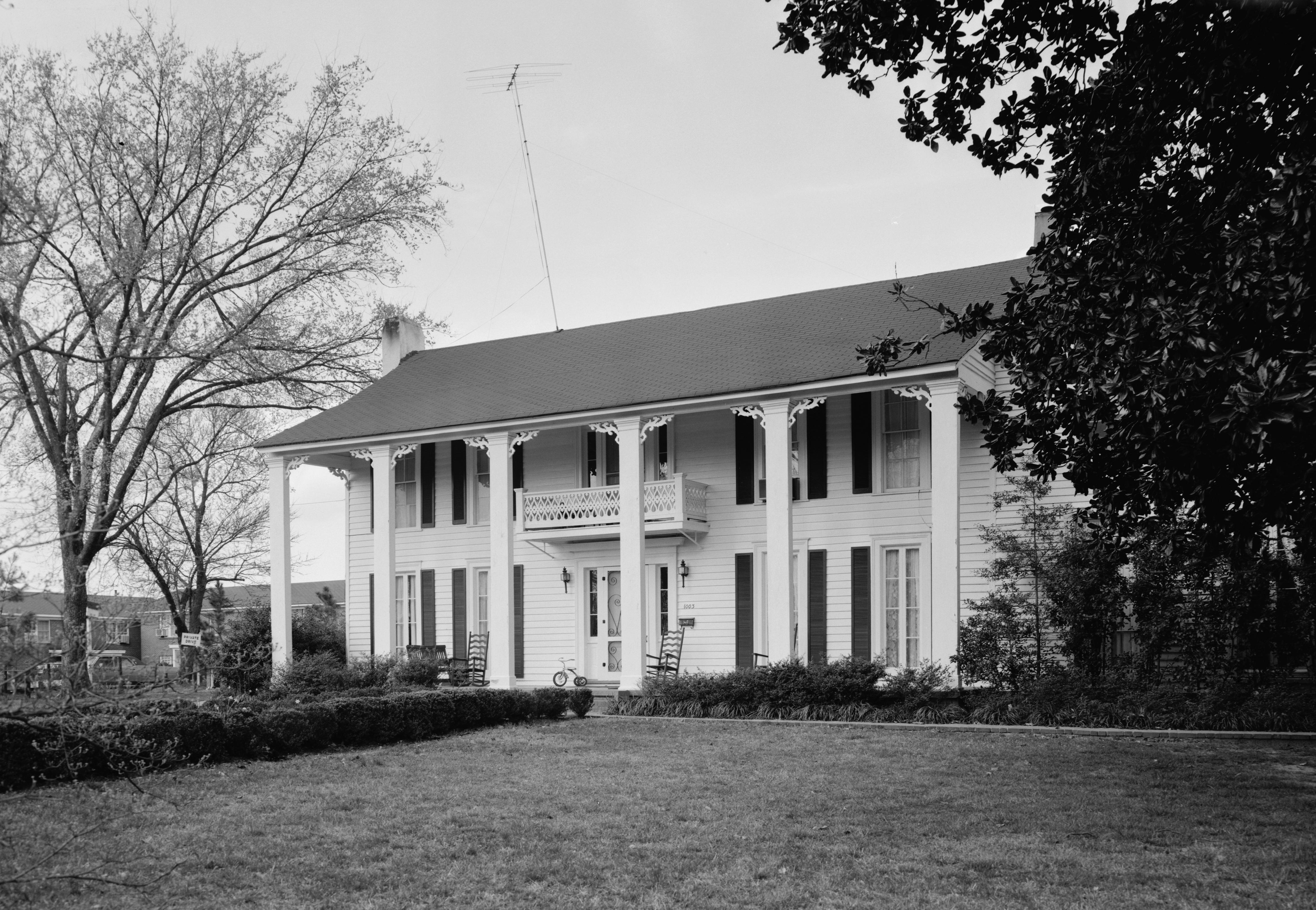
Isom Place NRHP Photo 1975

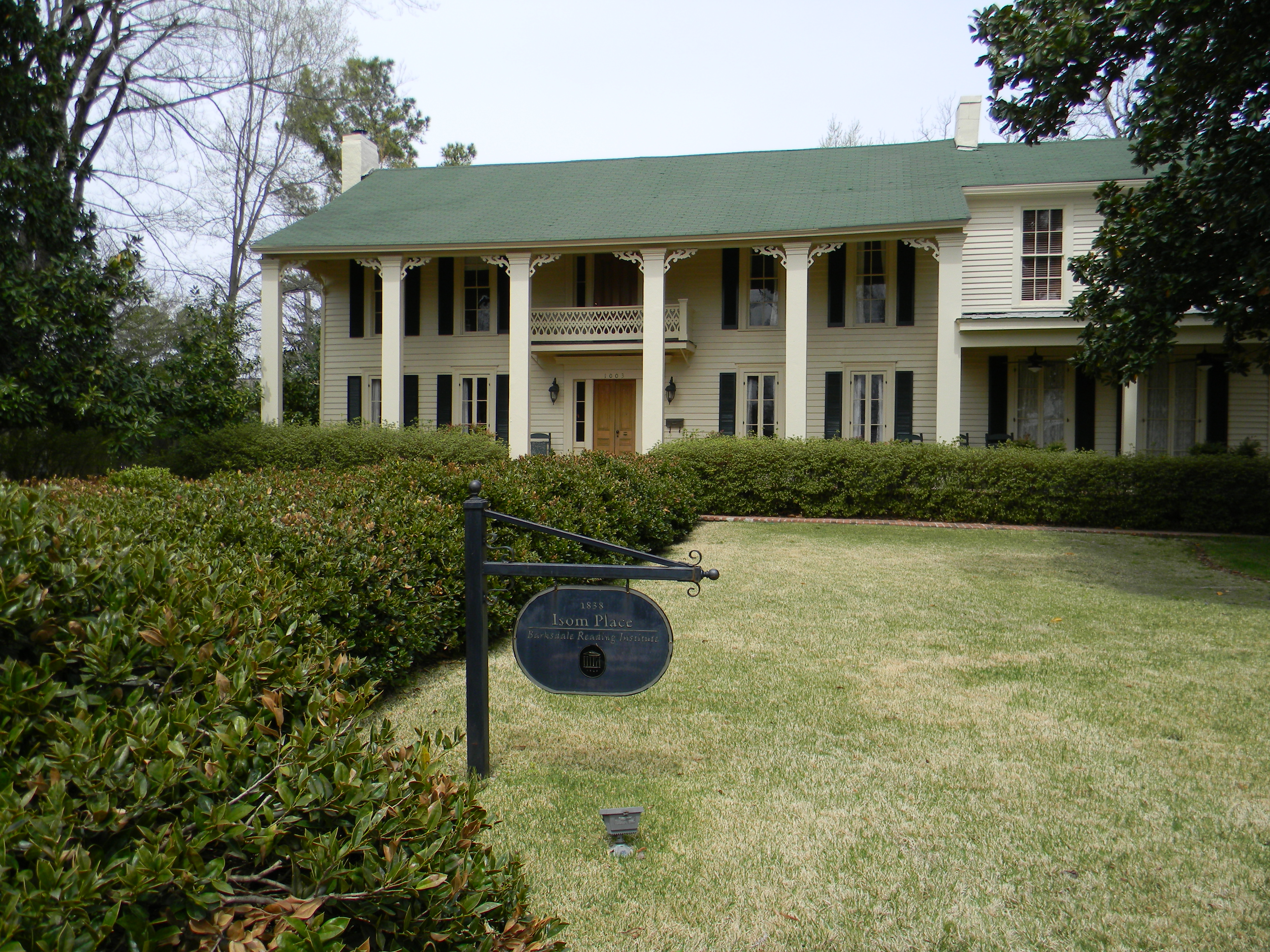
Isom Place Oxford Mississippi Front Facing 2015

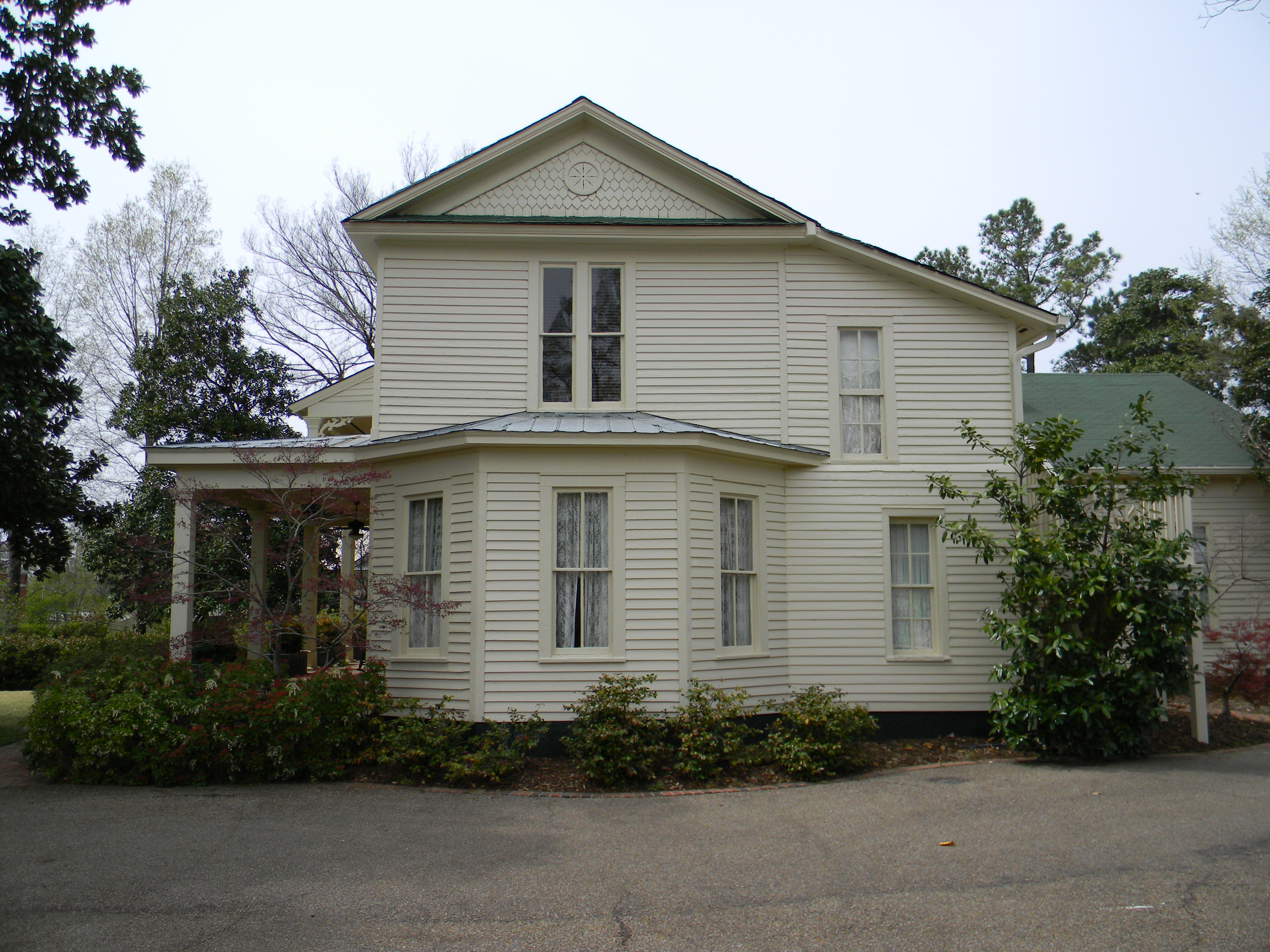
Isom Place Oxford Mississippi Left Facing 2015

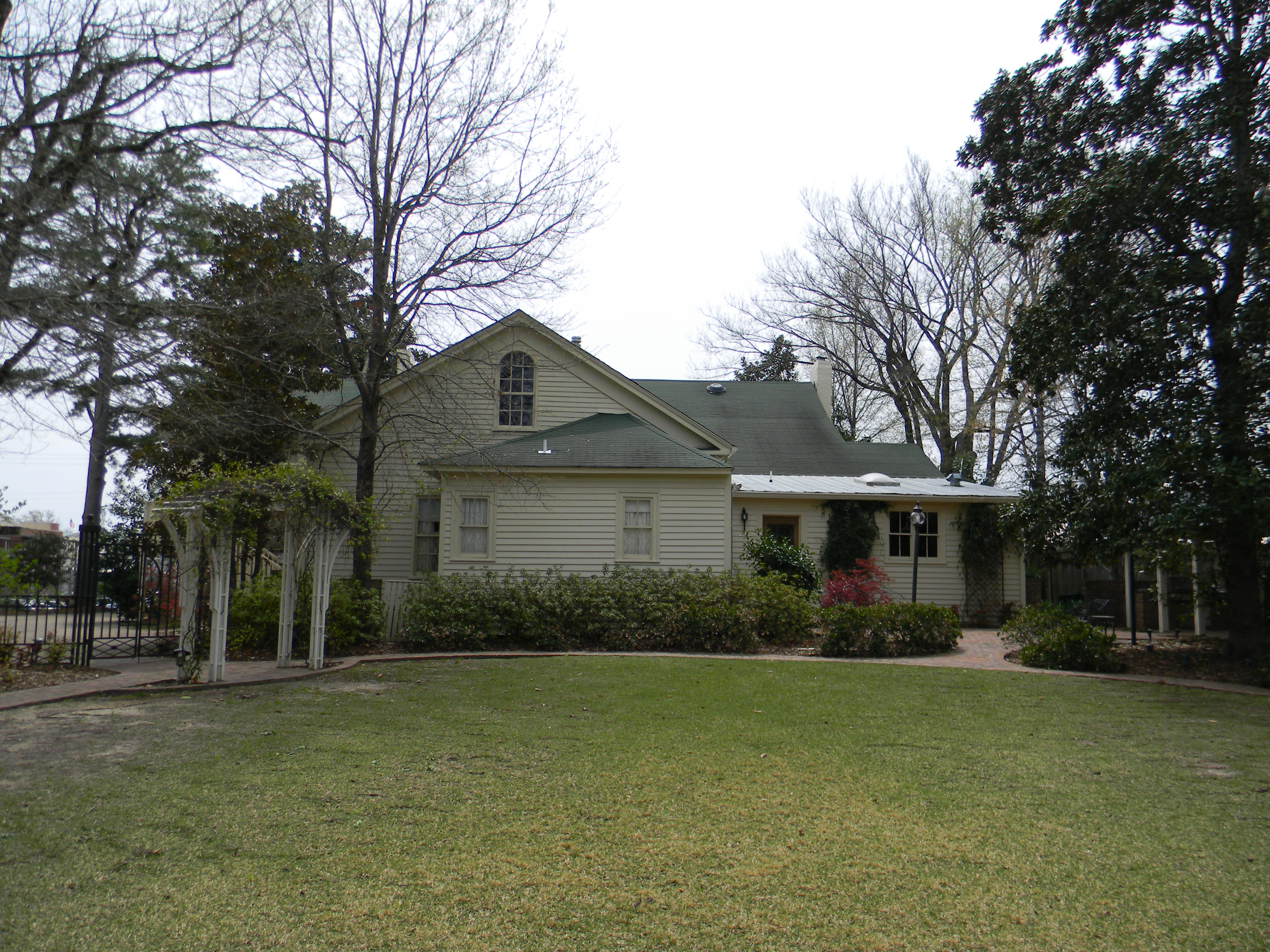
Isom Place Oxford Mississippi Rear Facing 2015
