= Abbeville Colored School =

Historic school in Mississippi, United States

- U.S. National Register of Historic Places
- Mississippi Landmark
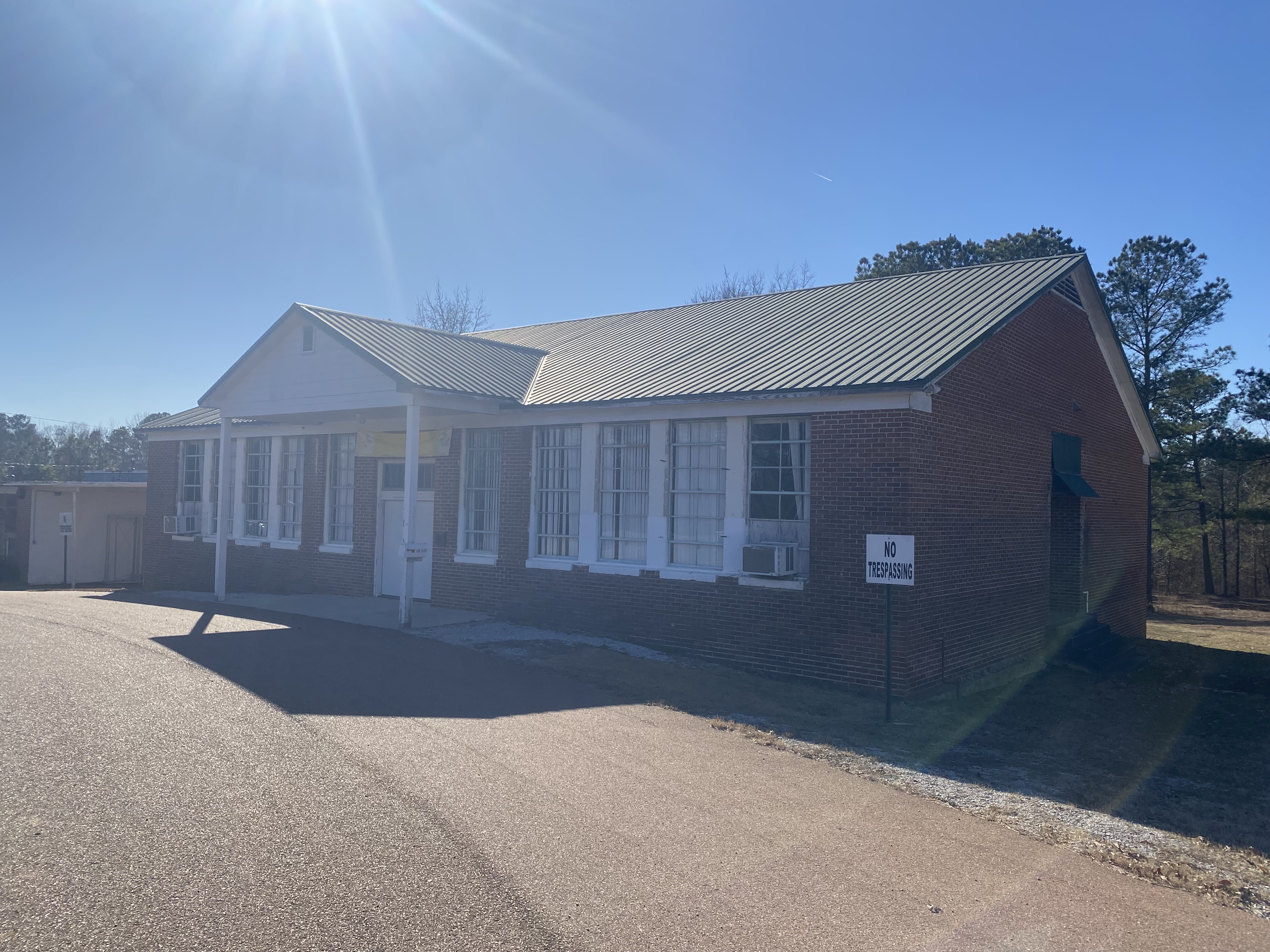
- The 1949 building
- Interactive map of Abbeville Colored School
- Location: 35 County Road 115, Abbeville, Mississippi
- Coordinates: 34.47367°N 89.51053°W
- Built: 1949 (junior high); 1960 (elementary school)
- NRHP reference No.: 100006175
- Added to NRHP: February 22, 2021

The Gordon Community and Cultural Center, formerly the Abbeville Colored School, is a historic school in Abbeville, Mississippi. There are two buildings on the property. The first building was built in 1949 and opened for students in 1950, while the second building was built in 1960. Another building was constructed in the 1950s, but was torn down during the 1980s. The property was designated as a Mississippi Landmark on June 19, 2020, while it was listed on the National Register of Historic Places on February 22, 2021.

== History ==
Around the time of the foundation of the school, the state of Mississippi had begun a so-called "school equalization program," in which funding for black schools was increased. This was done in hopes to prevent integration.

As such, the Lafayette County Board of Supervisors provided $4,000 in funding for a public black school. The local black community matched that $4,000. The first school was built in 1949 on land donated by the Gordon family and opened to students in January 1950, serving first through eighth grades. The school had four classrooms, though it lacked running water or indoor bathrooms. A few years later, another building used for ninth through twelfth grade was built. A third building, used for grades one through six, was built in 1960, while the original building became used for the seventh and eighth grades. In the late 1960s, the schools were integrated and children were bused to all-white schools in nearby Oxford. In the 1970s, the state established a Head Start program in the newest of the three buildings, although this was moved to Oxford years later. Beyond this, all three buildings sat abandoned for nearly 40 years, except for the second building, which was demolished in the 1980s.

Starting in 2009, a campaign was launched to raise funds for the renovation of the original school, in order to turn it into a community center. Through the years, the campaign raised funding from community members, local government, and the University of Mississippi. In 2014, the center, officially named the Gordon Community and Cultural Center, opened for after-school programs and summer enrichment opportunities. The property was officially designated as a Mississippi Landmark in 2020. The historic designation allowed the center to receive grants to continue renovations on the original building. It also helped start renovations on the newer building, which the center hopes to turn into an adult vocational school. In 2022, a historic marker outside of the buildings was erected by the Mississippi Department of Archives and History.

== See also ==
- National Register of Historic Places listings in Lafayette County, Mississippi
