= Avent Acres Neighborhood Historic District =

Historic neighborhood in Oxford, Mississippi, United States

- U.S. National Register of Historic Places
- U.S. Historic district
- Interactive map of Avent Acres Neighborhood Historic District
- Location: Approx. Lamar Ave. and Oxford Apartments; Parcels 135L-21-059.00, 135L-21-062.00, 35L-21- 078.00 & 35L-21-078.00; Douglas Dr.;and Sisk Ave., Oxford, Mississippi, United States
- Coordinates: 34.3731°N 89.5121°W
- Built: 1950s
- Architect: Wallace E. Johnson
- Architectural style: Colonial Revival, Minimal Traditional, Ranch-style
- NRHP reference No.: 100004508
- Designated HD: July 14, 2020

The Avent Acres Neighborhood Historic District is a neighborhood in Oxford, Mississippi, United States, listed as a historic district on the National Register of Historic Places. The neighborhood was constructed in the 1950s to help house soldiers returning from World War II. The process for getting the district listed on the NRHP started in 2018, and the neighborhood was officially listed on the register in 2020.

== Description ==
62 contributing buildings and 22 non-contributing buildings, all houses and apartment complexes, make up the Avent Acres Neighborhood Historic District. The houses are located on Avent Street, Combs Street, Douglas Drive, Oxford Apartments Cove, Sisk Avenue, and Williams Avenue near downtown Oxford.

Most of the contributing properties in the district are single-story cottages built in the Colonial Revival, Minimal Traditional, and Ranch architectural styles.

== History ==
=== Development ===
After World War II, the local Avent family subdivided their farmland to create the Avent Acres subdivision. The intention behind this was to provide soldiers returning from the war affordable housing in the city, where soldiers could use their low-interest, no down payment mortgages as part of the G.I. Bill.

Memphis, Tennessee-based builder Wallace E. Johnson designed the neighborhood, in consultation with T. Edison Avent, in the 1950s. Three different types of homes were identified by MDAH architectural historian James Bridgeforth, who also verified that much of the structures in the district remained largely unchanged from their original forms.

University of Wisconsin–Milwaukee historian Elizabeth M. Kerr connected the development of the neighborhood to changes in plots and characters of author William Faulkner's Snopes trilogy, calling T. Edison Avent "as legendary as the Snopeses are in Jefferson."

=== Securing historic designation ===
Oxford city planners began seeking Certified Local Government Program grant money to survey the Avent Acres neighborhood in February 2018. The initial proposal included nearly 100 homes in the aforementioned area of Oxford. In June that year, the Oxford Board of Aldermen granted permission to accept a grant from the Mississippi Department of Archives and History to survey the neighborhood. At the conclusion of the survey, two public hearings were conducted by the MDAH in 2019 to showcase findings. The MDAH found that much of the significance came as an example of veteran housing in the post-war era rather than for its architectural style.

The city Board of Aldermen approved the nomination for Avent Acres to be considered for national historic district status, and the proposal was submitted to the state review board for consideration in June 2019. The district was officially listed on the National Register of Historic Places on July 14, 2020.
