= Mississippi Secession Ordinance =

The Mississippi Secession Ordinance was written by Lucius Quintus Cincinnatus Lamar (II), who resigned from the U.S. Congress in January 1861. The ordinance was signed by James Z. George and others.

Text of Ordinance:

AN ORDINANCE to dissolve the union between the State of Mississippi and other States united with her under the compact entitled "The Constitution of the United States of America".

The people of the State of Mississippi, in convention assembled, do ordain and declare, and it is hereby ordained and declared, as follows, to wit:

Section 1. That all the laws and ordinances by which the said State of Mississippi became a member of the Federal Union of the United States of America be, and the same are hereby, repealed, and that all obligations on the part of the said State or the people thereof to observe the same be withdrawn, and that the said State doth hereby resume all the rights, functions, and powers which by any of said laws or ordinances were conveyed to the Government of the said United States, and is absolved from all the obligations, restraints, and duties incurred to the said Federal Union, and shall from henceforth be a free, sovereign, and independent State.

Sec. 2. That so much of the first section of the seventh article of the Constitution of this State as requires members of the Legislature and all officers, executive and judicial, to take an oath or affirmation to support the Constitution of the United States be, and the same is hereby, abrogated and annulled.

Sec. 3. That all rights acquired and vested under the Constitution of the United States, or under any act of Congress passed, or treaty made, in pursuance thereof, or under any law of this State, and not incompatible with this ordinance, shall remain in force and have the same effect as if this ordinance had not been passed.

Sec. 4. That the people of the State of Mississippi hereby consent to form a federal union with such of the States as may have seceded or may secede from the Union of the United States of America, upon the basis of the present Constitution of the said United States, except such parts thereof as embrace other portions than such seceding States.

Thus ordained and declared in convention the 9th day of January, in the year of our Lord 1861.
