= Mitchell – Foster – Young House =

Historic house in Mississippi, United States

Coordinates: 34.391039°N 89.394229°W

- U.S. National Register of Historic Places
- Location within Mississippi
- Nearest city: Oxford, Mississippi
- Area: less than one acre
- Built: c. 1840
- Architectural style: Center-hall cottage
- NRHP reference No.: 07001182
- Added to NRHP: November 14, 2007

The Mitchell – Foster – Young House is a historic house located just outside Oxford, Mississippi off the highway to New Albany. The house, thought to be one of the oldest standing farmhouses in the county, is listed on the National Register of Historic Places.

== Background ==
Beginning when the original 1839 land grant was issued by President Martin Van Buren, the property was an active working farm until mid-1942 when then owner George Wright Young was infirm and left the property to live with relatives in central Mississippi. After he vacated the house, the property was then rented for several years. The house subsequently was closed and remained unoccupied for over six decades.

Over time, weather and decay caused all outbuildings, including the barn, to fall but the house remained primarily due to the integrity of the corrugated metal roof. The house's isolation in the woods hid and protected it from potential vandals.

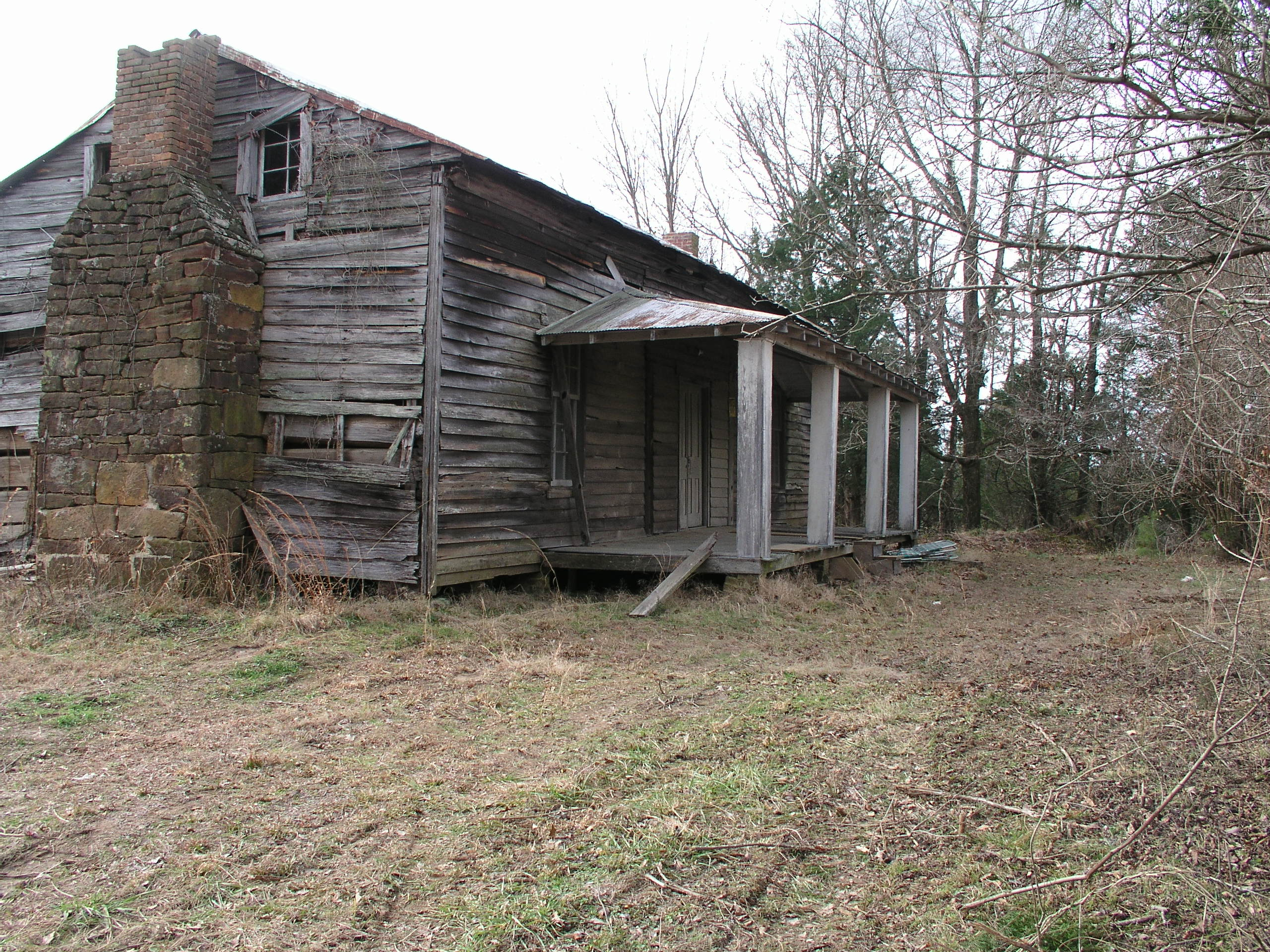
One of the first recent photographs of the c1840 Mitchell – Foster – Young House. This photo, taken c2003, with weatherboard peeling away, reveals the log timbers used for construction and shows the massive original stone fireplace.

Rotting at the corners where vines and moisture encroached finally threatened to undermine the integrity of the structure and the unoccupied house was in danger of collapsing in 2005, when a plan to repair it was created. Those plans were abandoned when termite and other animal-caused damage was discovered. The house had been originally built too close to the ground, making it impossible to avoid future similar damage if the house was simply repaired without a proper higher foundation. Alternatively, a plan was implemented to dismantle the house nail-by-nail and board-by-board and completely restore the house. A newly built barn housed the methodically marked and cataloged timbers and boards, until a new, raised foundation was built. Then, in reverse order, the timbers and boards were reassembled and reinstalled.

Several unanticipated and yet to be explained building techniques and materials used in the house's original construction were discovered during the restoration process. Additionally, a detailed review and assessment of each prior owner was performed using property and US Census records. Collectively, they established more clearly the phases and dates of construction.

== History ==
Several years after the Treaty of Pontotoc Creek between the Chickasaw Nation and the government was signed in October 1832, land grants were sold. The treaty ceded land that is now north Mississippi and western Tennessee. In Lafayette County, created in 1836, the more popular and in-demand land grants were near the rivers west of the town of Oxford. The land to the east was hillier and relatively less desirable for farming.

In 1839, the US government issues a land-grant for the Mitchell – Foster – Young property, east of the town of Oxford, to Benjamin M. Mitchell, who apparently did not live on the property, but did live in Lafayette County. He applied for and received a brand from the newly formed Lafayette County, and used the property for his cattle that roamed freely. He likely built the original 20’ x 20’ log cabin c1840 for his overseers.

The original owner sold the property in 1847 to the Fosters, a farming family of six that lived in the Paris community of Lafayette County, just south of Oxford. They were responsible for renovating the one room log cabin, converting it to a three-room house with an east-to-west gable roof. It took them several years to construct the addition to the house. In the 1860 US Census, they were still living in the Paris community. The Fosters likely completed the house and moved before the outbreak of the Civil War. By the time of the 1870 US Census, they are living in the house.

This large farming family owned the house until 1894. During the time they owned the property and lived in the house, it is likely the final construction was completed.

George W. Young's father-in-law, Edward Henry Woodward, bought this property and the adjacent property to the east in 1900, and along with his son, James Richard Woodward, moved their families from the Caswell Community just northeast of Oxford.

Their families lived on the adjoining parcels of land and they shared the farming responsibilities. Things were going so well that Richard bought two more quarter sections bordering on the farm in 1902. They now owned 540 acres.

Then everything changed for Richard. Henry died in 1904, and Henry's wife, Richard's mother, died a year later. Richard or someone very close to the family successfully convinced his sister Claudia and her new husband George W. Young to sell his farm in Panola County and to move to the property, where Claudia's parents had lived until their recent death.

George, Claudia, and their three children moved from Sardis to Lafayette County in 1905, and he farmed the property until 1942.

== Description ==
The George Wright Young House is located east of Oxford, Mississippi. The house is a two-story, side-gabled, center-hall planter's cottage with a rear ell.

The original c1840 cabin was a one-room structure with the massive stone fireplace, a north-to-south gable roof, no windows, and a door facing the north.

The house was augmented in at least three phases and is believed to have taken its present form c1859.

The main façade facing north is three bays wide (room 1, foyer hall and room 2) featuring double four-paneled door entrance in the central bay, flanked by a pair of six-over-nine, double-hung “cottage” windows in each of the outer bays. An undercut gallery with plain square wood columns spans four-fifths of the façade and features a wooden deck.

The west façade is also three bays wide (room 2, room 3 and room 4) featuring a brick shouldered chimney outside room 2 flanked by a pair of four-over-four windows on the main floor and a pair of two-over-three windows in the second floor attic, a pair of six-over-six windows in room 3, and an exit door in room 4.

The rear of the house facing south is three bays wide (room 4, center hall and room 1). There are no windows at the end of ell, but there is a six-over-nine window on the rear of room 1. The rear has a single exterior door from the hall.

The east façade is also three bays wide (room 4 and room 3 in the ell, and room 1) featuring a small two-over-two window in room 4, a single exterior door from room 3 and a massive sandstone shouldered chimney outside of room 1 flanked by a pair of two-over-three windows in the second-floor attic.

The house rests on stone piers and the roof is clad in corrugated metal. The walls of the entire façade are clad in weatherboard siding.

== Construction Phases ==
Constructed c1840, the house was originally a single 20’ x 20’ room (room 1) with a massive fireplace on the east wall.

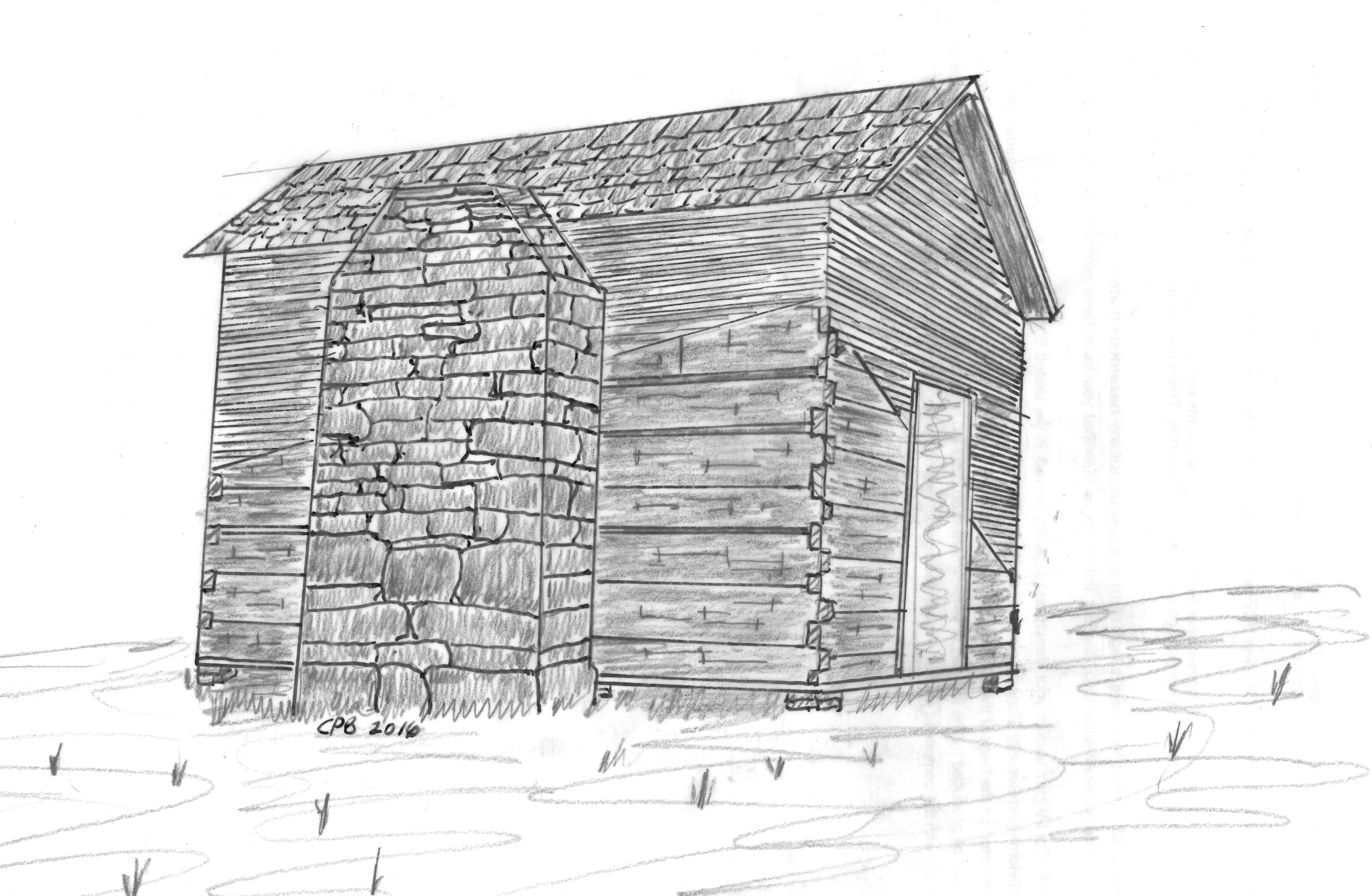
Artist's concept of how the c1840 cabin looked.

The building was constructed with large hand-hewn heart of pine timbers. Using a broad axe, the timbers were hewn flat on both the exterior and the interior sides. The rectangular hewn timbers were typically in excess of seventeen-inches high and six-inches deep. They were stacked horizontally from just above the ground to a height of approximately 12 feet at the eve of the gabled roof, which ran north-to-south. On the east side, the eve was just below the top of the chimney. The timbers, some twenty feet long, were joined at the corners with square notching. The sill timbers were supported at the corners with piers composed of stacked local rocks.

There were generally two reasons that builders of the period hewed the exterior and/or the interior of the timbers into a flat surface. One, was to remove the bark and sapwood layers which, over time, promoted rotting, and the second reason was to apply weatherboard siding on the exterior and/or wall boards on the interior. The building likely had both interior wall boards and exterior weather strip siding.

The interior ceiling in the cabin was eight feet high and the ceiling rafters were notched into the fourth from the top course of timbers, leaving about four feet of attic space at the eves, and approximately seven feet at the gable ridge. With a hole in the ceiling and a wall mounted ladder, occupants of the cabin likely used the space for sleeping and storage.

The fireplace chimney on the exterior of the east wall extends to the original height of room 1 and is constructed from large blocks of local sandstone.

The house was augmented with phase 2 c1859 with the center foyer hall, and the second room (room 2, the right front façade bay), a small front gallery, and a second story attic accessible by stairs in the hall.

In phase 3, a third room, room 3, built c1870 directly behind the room 2, was constructed on a beam base using 2” x 4” wall studs spaced irregularly. Room 3 measures 15’ 4” x 14’ 0”. The interior wall of room 3 facing room 2 has the exterior weatherboard of room 2. Room 3 was built abutted to but not structurally integrated into the main house except with the roofing.

The 9’ 6” x 13’ 6” room, room 4, was built behind room 3 at the same time, and is also built on a beam base using 2” x 4” studs spaced irregularly. Room 4, used as a kitchen, has an insulated chimney sleeve for a stovepipe.

The original kitchen was built probably during phase 2 and detached from the house to isolate accidental fires. The vertical pine timber materials used in room 4 are similar to those used in room 2. The interior wallboard materials in room 4 are believed to be the wood that was used for the original detached kitchen when it was built during phase 2. The interior boards have square nail holes, indicating that they had been used prior to phase 3. In phase 3, the kitchen was attached to the house.

Since the completion of phase 3 c1870, no significant alterations have been made to the house.

== Construction Techniques ==
=== Phase 1: c1840 Log Cabin ===
The c1840 log cabin was built from pine logs laid horizontally and interlocked with notches on the ends. The logs were stacked to a height of eight feet, and the top rail notched to accommodate the ceiling rafters. Then logs were stacked for an additional four feet of height to accommodate a nominal amount of room in the attic. The attic, likely used for storage and sleeping, was accessed through a hole in the ceiling and a wall mounted ladder. The cabin roof was gabled, running north-to-south.

The old-growth trees used had few limbs (knots) and were straight with little taper. The corner notches were not uniformly cut, indicating that each log's corner notch was cut to match the specific cut of the adjoining log to minimize the size of the gap between the logs and reduced the amount of chinking (sticks or rocks) needed to fill the gap. The height of trees on the property determined the length of the available logs used in each wall.

The cabin's corners were set on large stones and additional stones were used for support at other points along the sill (bottom log).

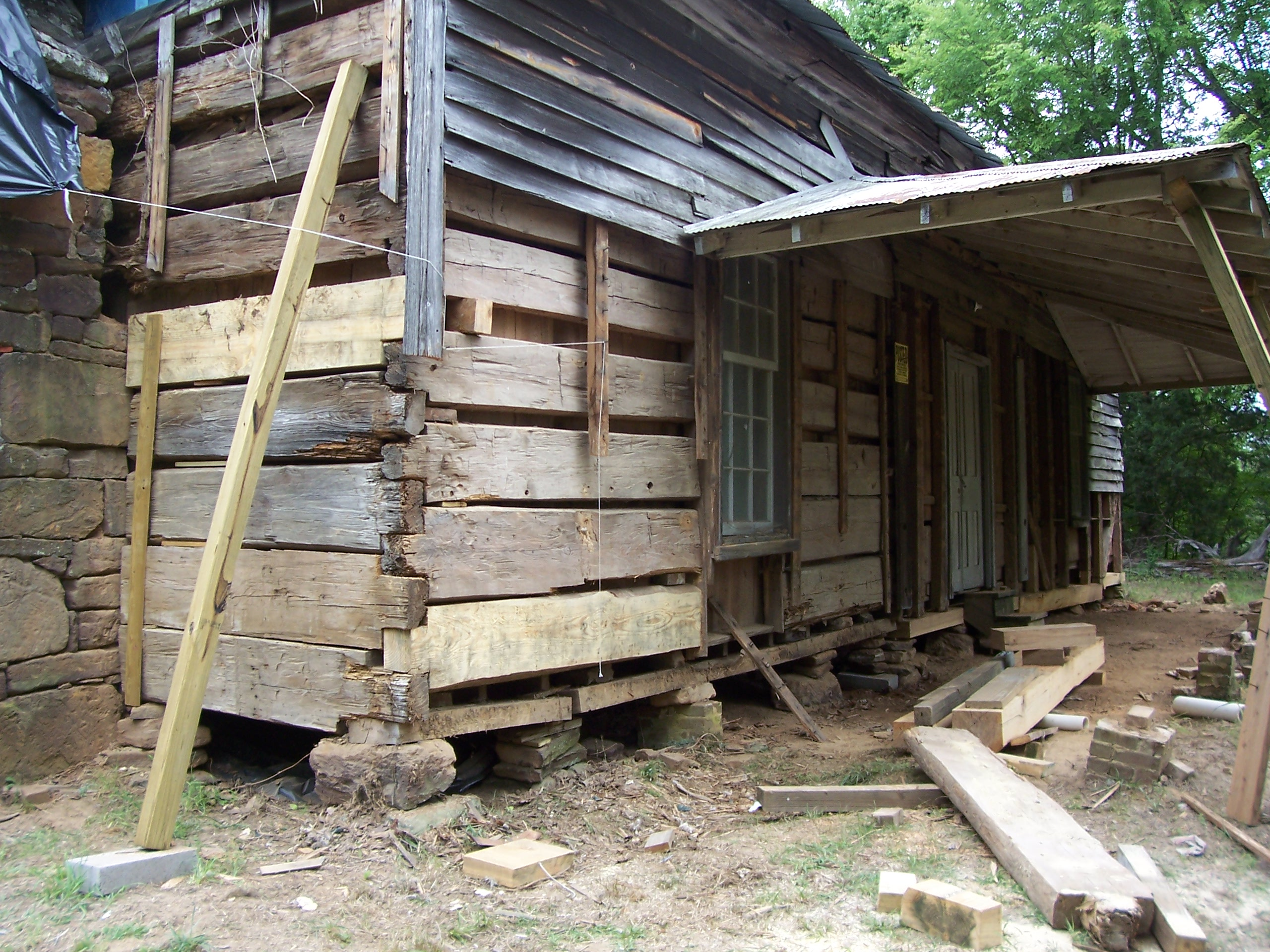
Here several of the near rotted log timbers have been replaced. The sill beams are visible as are the stone piles on which the house rests.

The cabin was anchored on a field-stone chimney; with mud applied to seal any gaps in the tight-fitting stones. The fireplace was used for cooking and for heat in the winter.

There is no evidence that there were windows. Specifically, the west wall, where a door was cut in phase 2, was composed of 20’ timbers. The entrance door was to the north; where, today, a window is installed.

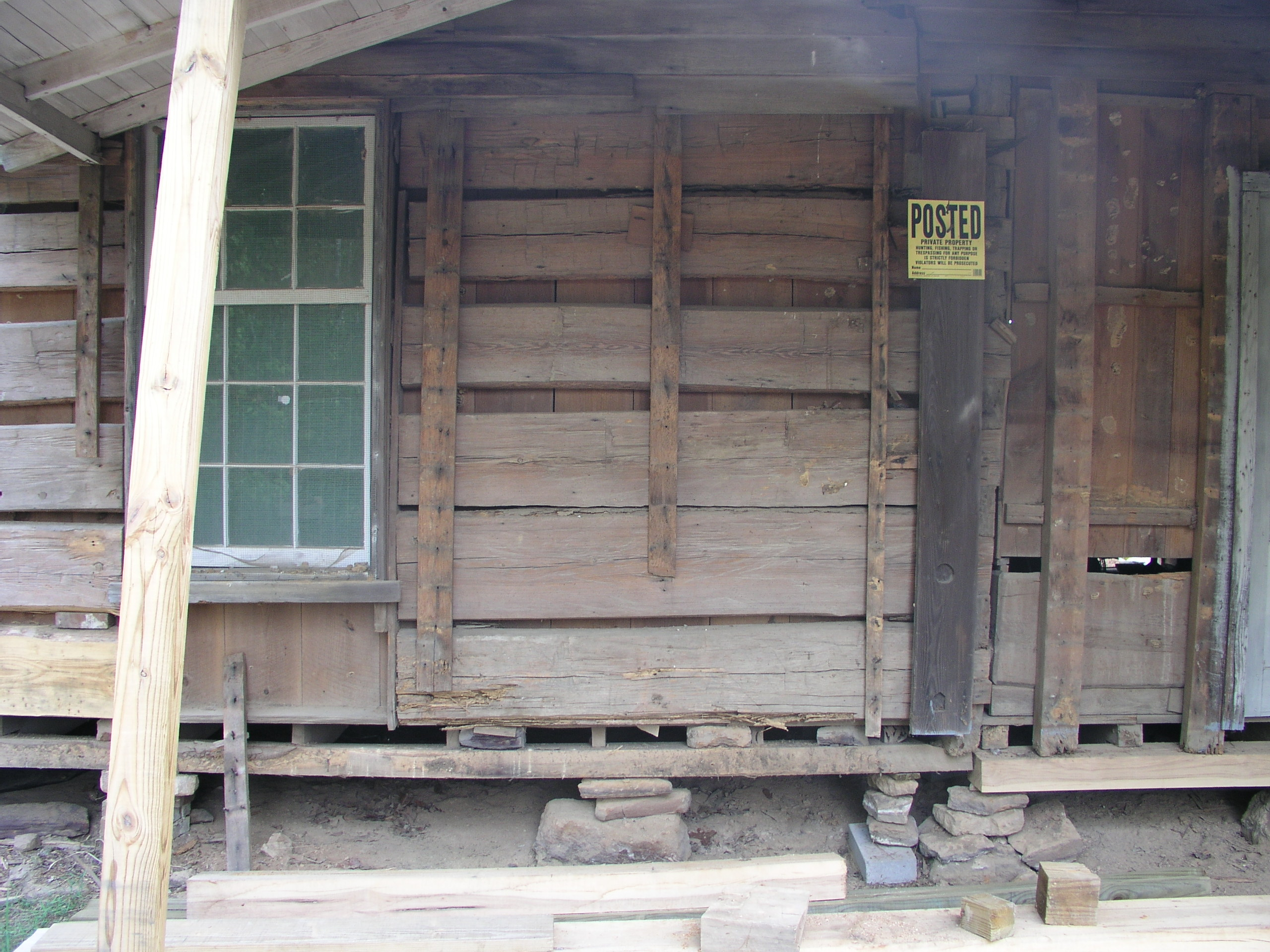
This photo shows the position of the original door centered on the north wall where a window is installed today. It is clear where the west corner was and how the old is incorporated into the phase 2 addition. Note the vertical board with the “Posted” sign has rail holes at the bottom for both at the top and lower rail of the original phase 2 porch. Also note that there are multiple sills supporting the cabin.

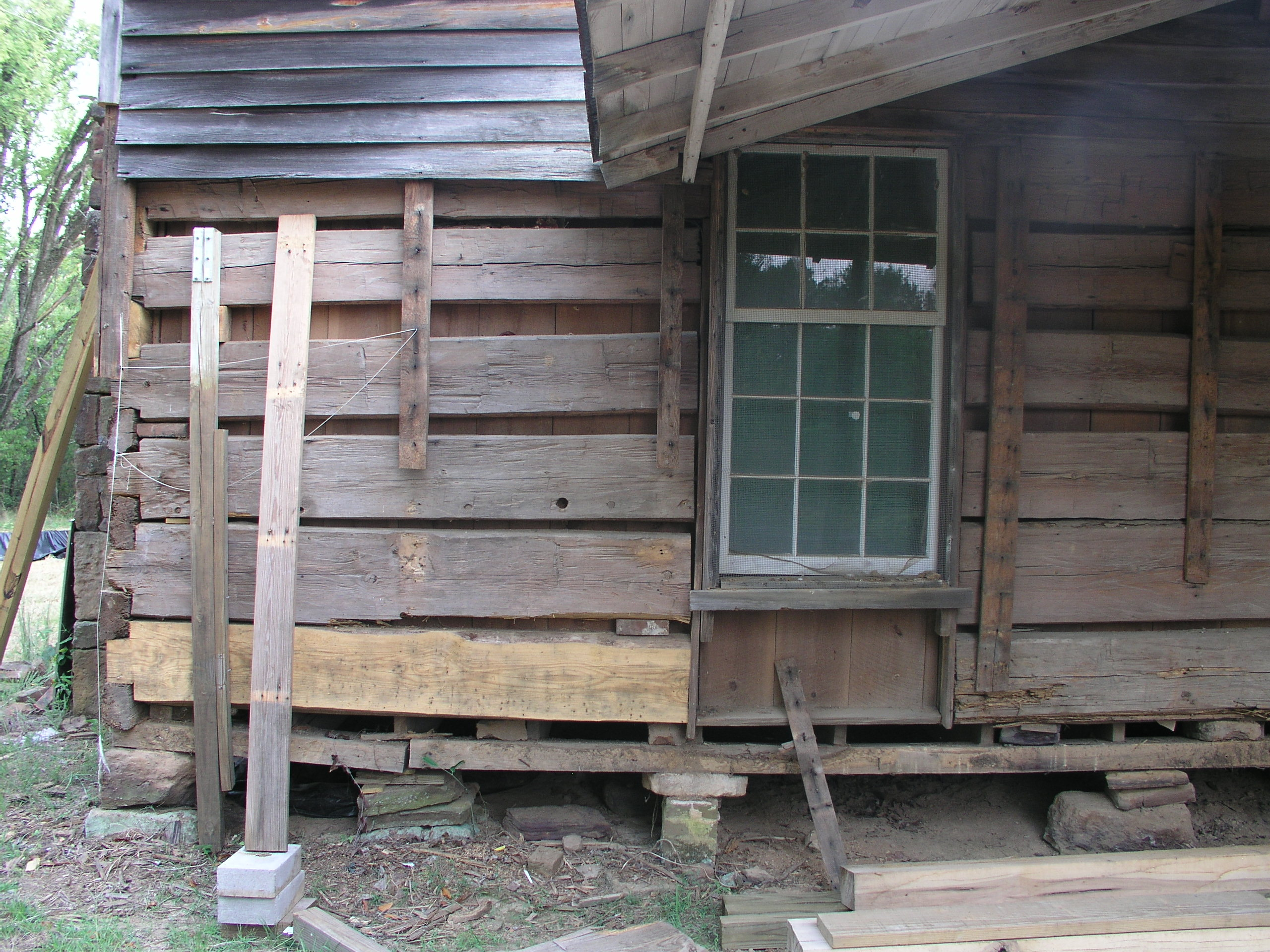
This photo shows the northeast corner of the original cabin. The space under the window in the lowest course of logs, indicate that the original opening here was a door that was subsequently replaced by this window.

=== Phase 2: c1850 Addition ===
The second owner, who ultimately lived on the property, bought it in 1847 and held it for forty-seven years until 1894. Most of the phase 2 and subsequent construction probably occurred during this period. During this time-frame, balloon framing was a popular and inexpensive technique for many farm houses in the 19th century. Requiring no specialized skills, it utilized long continuous framing members (studs) that ran from sill plate to eave line with intermediate floor structures nailed to them, with the heights of window sills, headers and next floor height marked out on the studs.

Surprisingly, balloon framing was not used on the c1850 addition, but rather a more complex method of mortise and tenon joinery that typically requires highly skilled workmen.

The foyer, room 2, gable roof, and the attic were built to the right of room 1. The room 1 ceiling height of 8 feet was used throughout the addition.

Framing - The vertical posts on the north and south side for room 2 and the foyer, built on an irregular beam base, were extended in length above the interior room ceiling to the top attic rail. The length was designed to match the height of the original room 1 roof. The vertical posts were long enough to extend about four feet above the ceiling joists.

A top rail across the front (north side) of room 2 and the foyer and another across the rear (south side) of room 2 and the foyer tied the vertical beams all together. Each vertical post had a hand-made mortise at interior ceiling height to receive each ceiling joist, which had a tenon at each end. A wood peg secured each joint. The peg holes were chisel-cut with a square hole by hand, as opposed to round holes made with a drill, indicating construction in early 1800's. The pegs were hand-formed with an ax from small cut blocks of wood and sized to each hole. Additionally, vertical water saw marks marking are on the vertical posts. Neither the room 2 nor the foyer framing used nails.

During the restoration, the removed interior walls revealed that one of the vertical posts was larger than others and had an unused mortise. This indicated that mistakes were as common then as they are now, and that the builder found a way to adapt and use all available material.

Interior Finishing - The foyer and room 2 had interior wall, floor, and ceiling boards installed. Included also at this time was a wainscot in the foyer and room 2. Room 1 also had interior wall and ceiling boards installed for the first time.

Exterior Openings - The exterior doors into the house, a double door in the front and single door in the back, were now through the foyer. The original room 1 door facing the north was closed in and replaced by a window identical to the one used in the new room 2 windows. An interior door was cut through the massive beams in the west wall of room 1 for passage into the foyer.

Windows - There may have been glass windows installed for the first time with phase 2. Alternatively, wooden shutters closed in the evenings would have been used. Around 1935 the current glass single pane windows were installed, replacing the prior windows or alternatively replacing the shutters.

West Chimney - A brick fireplace and chimney was installed on the west end of room 2. The fireplace chimney in room 1 was extended in height to accommodate the gable roof height with brick similar to that used in the fireplace in the room 2.

Roof - The complete building (room 1, foyer, and room 2) was covered by a gable roof that ran east-to-west. The roof material was cedar shakes. The shake roof was later replaced by corrugated metal.

Attic - The gabled roof facilitated an attic. The current stairs were not installed until later, so access to the attic would have been in the foyer, perhaps with a ladder attached to the wall. Also, some attic flooring was added. The space was there, and probably badly needed and yet accessible only with a ladder.

Porch – Originally, a small undercut gallery with plain square wood posts spanned the width of the double front door and featured a wooden deck and a side rail. It may or may not have had a cover. This small porch was later replaced by the current large gallery porch.

A larger undercut gallery with plain square wood posts spanning four-fifths of the façade and featuring a wooden deck and box columns replaced the original. Two exterior boards on either side of the front door have the mortise holes for the top and bottom porch rail of the original porch.

Exterior Finishing - The entire house was covered with cedar weatherboard. At the front eave an intricate molding was installed. Similarly, across the rear a decorative molding was installed.

Kitchen - The outdoor kitchen was probably built at the same time. Timbers similar to those used for the interior walls of room 1 and room 2 were used in the standalone kitchen.

== Restoration ==
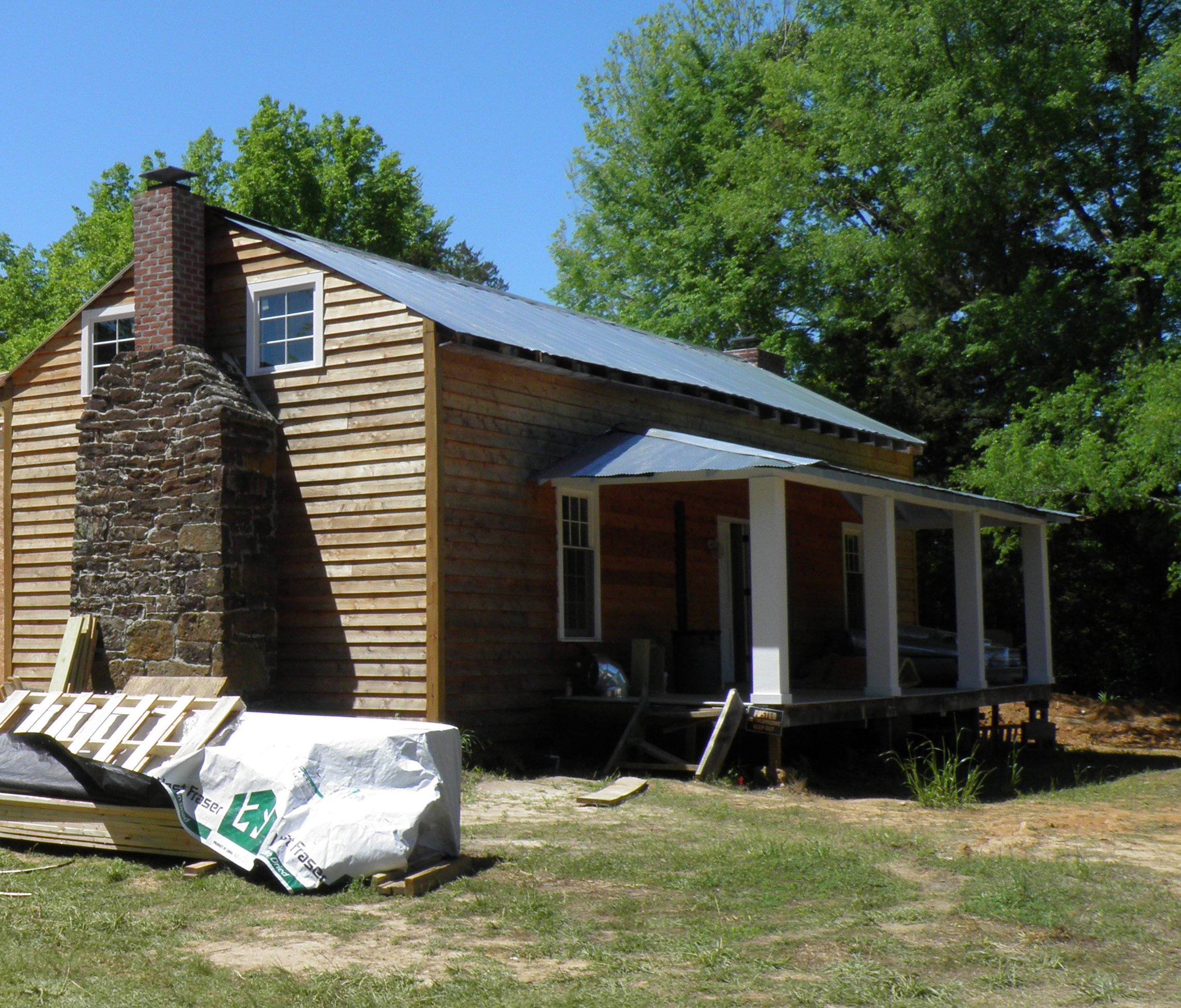
Taken in May 2012, the house restoration is near completion.

The restoration of the c1840 house was completed in 2012.

Of course, the result of the restoration excluded any modern conveniences such as running water, bathrooms, bedrooms, or kitchen facilities.

Essentially, the restored house contained a living room, a foyer with stairs, and a dining room. Additionally, it included the attic that ran east-west under the gabled roof.

So, the house was not livable by today’s standards.

== The Residence ==
After several residential plan designs and locations, we realized that the restored house would have little use unless the planned residence was attached. We designed an architecturally sound “soft touch” connection to the restored house that allowed the residence to be constructed immediately to its rear.

The residence and the house would be accessible through two existing doors in the house, one into the 1850 room, and the other into the foyer. Careful planning with the foundation height ensured the flooring between the house and the residence was aligned and level. Choosing a single-story residence built behind the house ensured that its roof not visible when standing in front of the restored house.

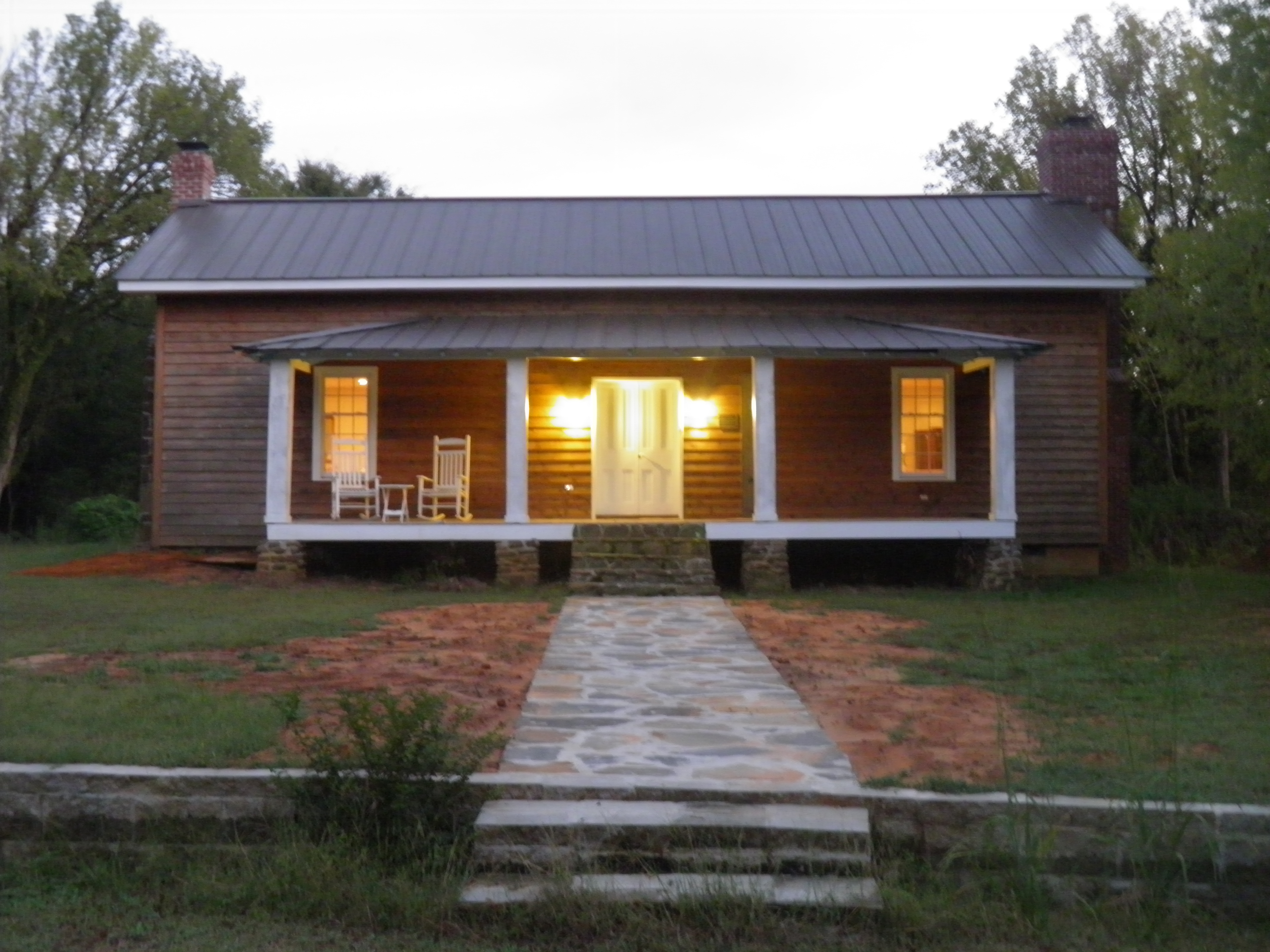
With the front walkway completed, the house lights have an exquisite glow.

This photo is taken in front of the house looking south. Visible is the parking area, steps and walkway to the house. Also visible is the slight rise in elevation from the parking area to the house. We exploited that difference in elevation when we built the retaining wall that now separates the house from the parking area. The raised elevation of the ground on which the house sits, architecturally described as an “eminence” - a high place or part; a hill, or elevation; height - gives the illusion that it is on a pedestal when entering the property from the drive.

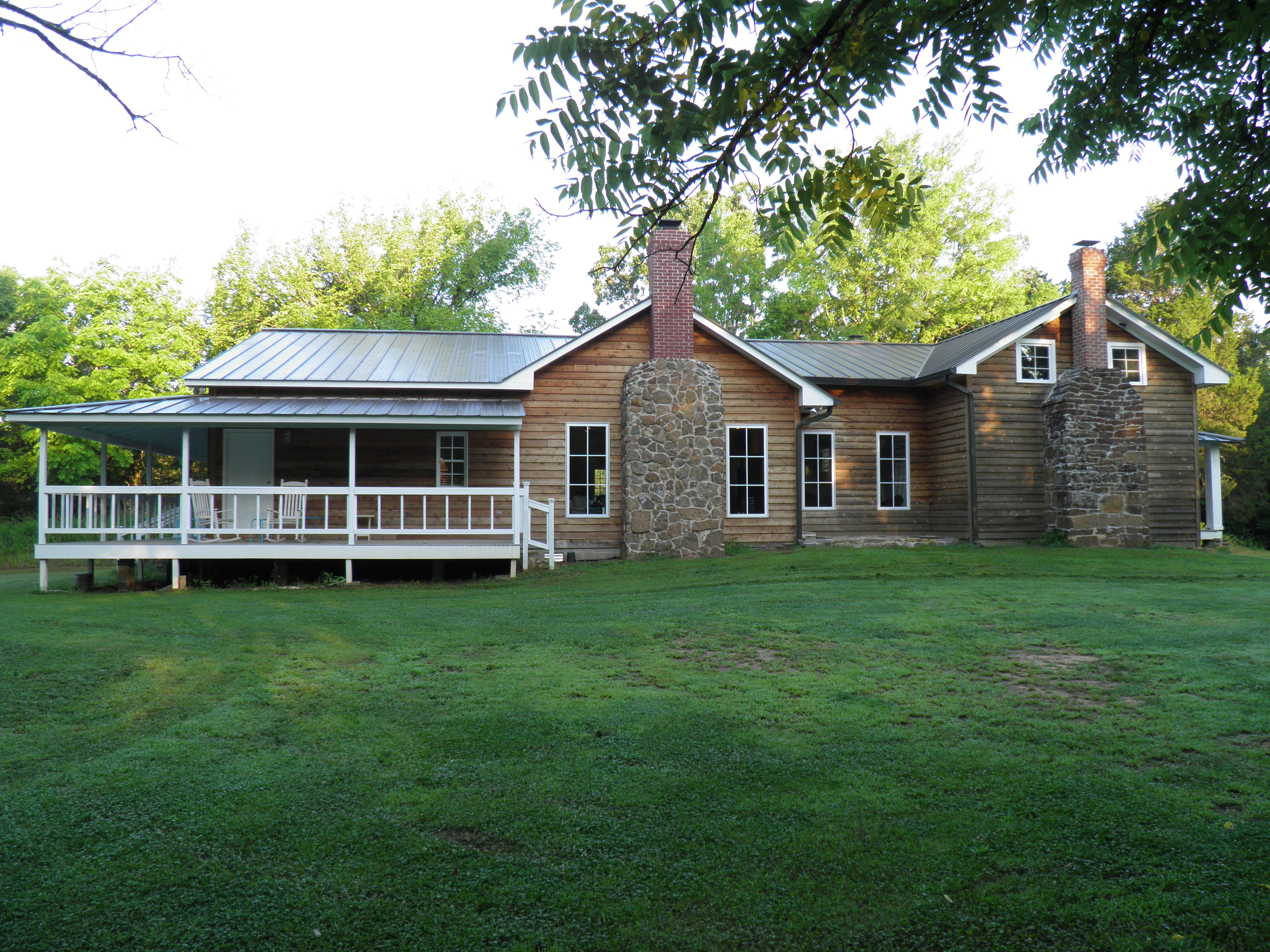
With restoration completed, a living residence was added directly behind the house.

Looking from the east, the house, to the right with its massive fireplace chimney, is in front of and adjacent to the residence. The residence consists of a kitchen, great room, bedrooms, storage closets, and bathrooms. A matching fireplace chimney is on the east wall in the great room, and a veranda wraps the east and south side of the residence.

Completed in about six months, the residence complements the restored house and makes the house a functional part of property.

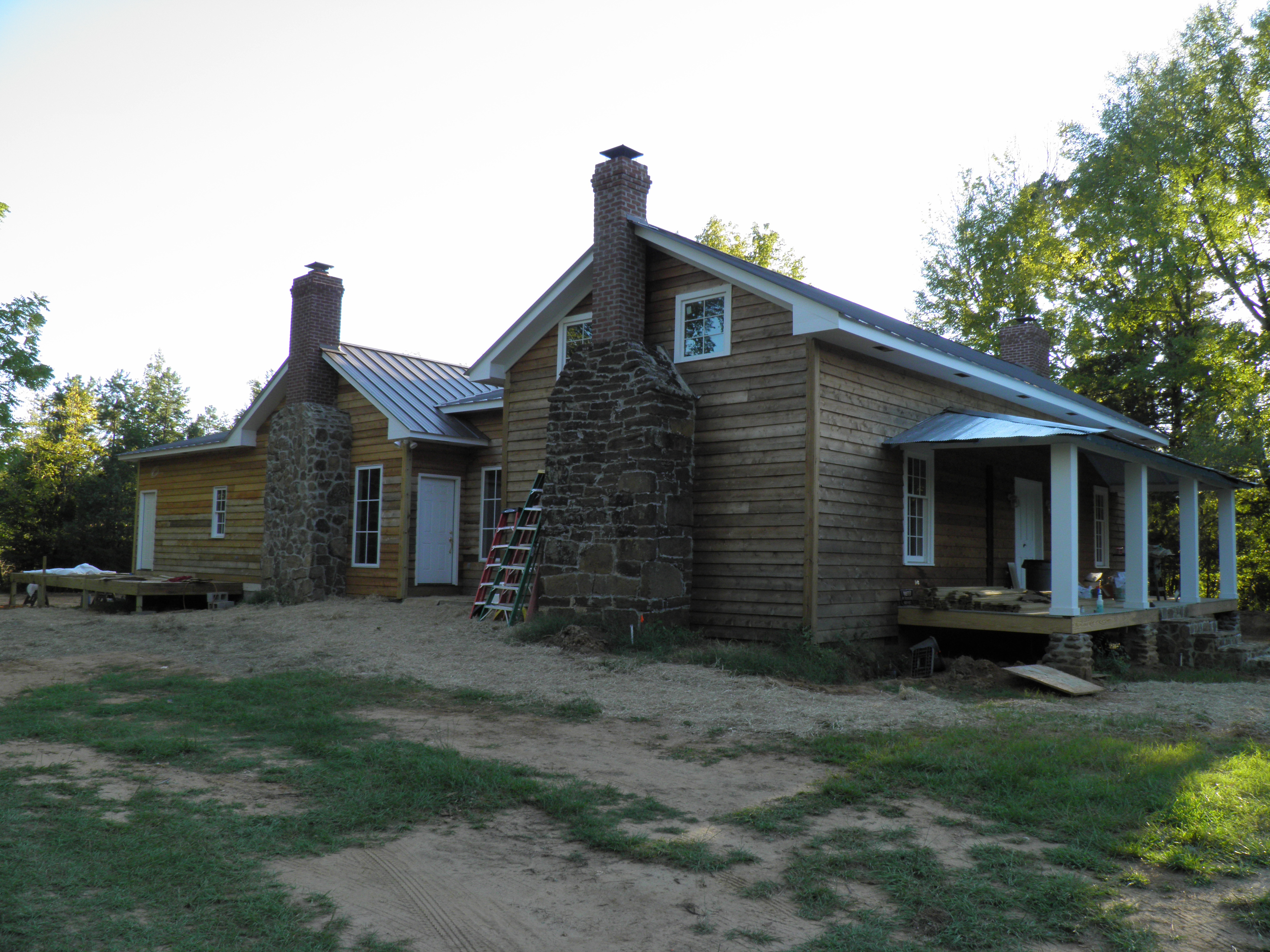
The house and the residence, taken December 2012.

Located in the Holly Springs National Forest, the property is isolated and surrounded by deep woods where indigenous animals have little human interaction.

Regular sightings of turkeys and deer occur year round.

Of course, there is no hunting allowed on the property.
