= Steel and tin cans =

Sealed container for storage of foods

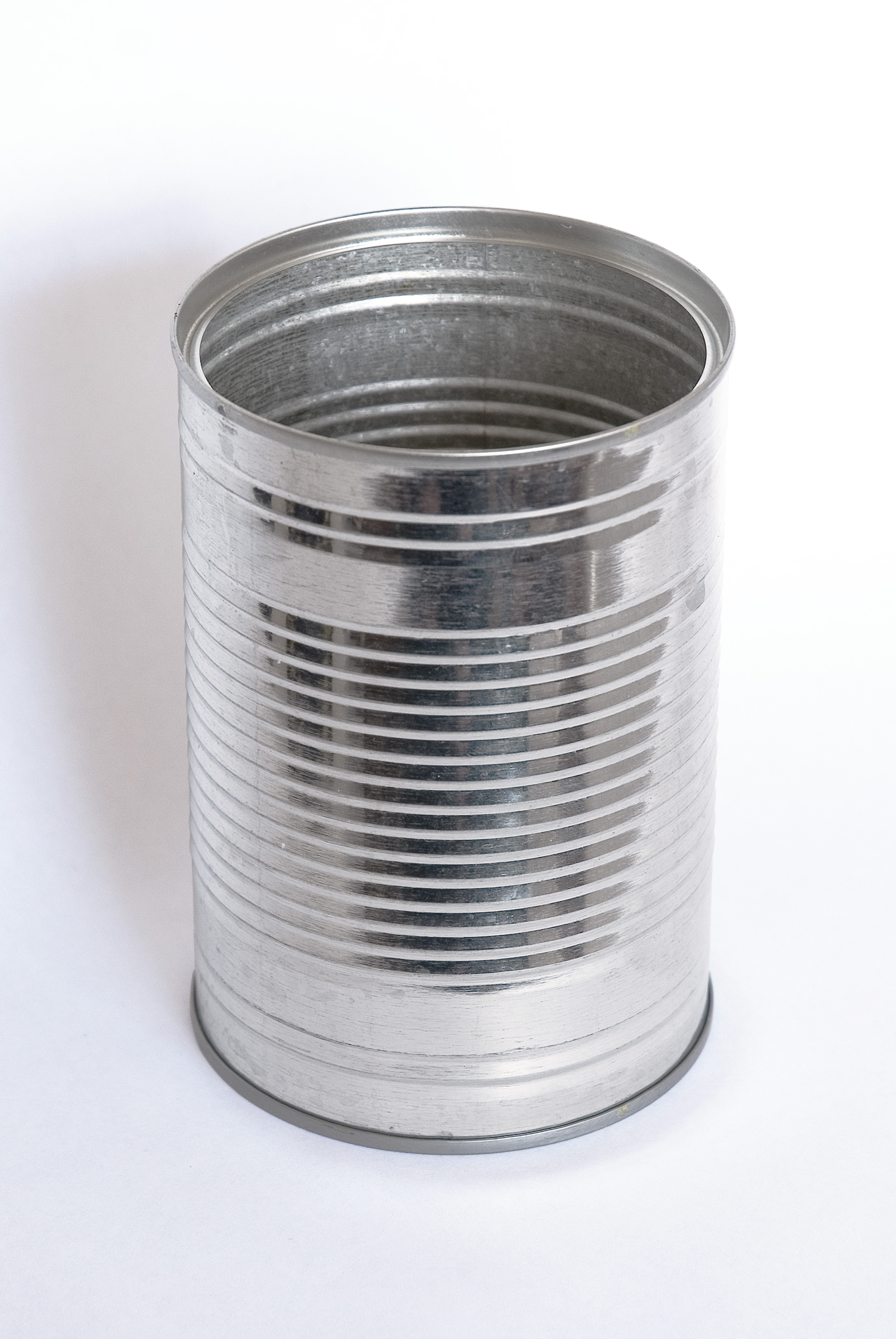
An empty tin can

A steel can, tin can, tin (especially in British English, Australian English, Canadian English and South African English), or can is a container made of thin metal, for distribution or storage of goods. Some cans are opened by removing the top panel with a can opener or other tool; others have covers removable by hand without a tool. Cans can store a broad variety of contents: food, beverages, oil, chemicals, etc. In a broad sense, any metal container is sometimes called a "tin can", even if it is made of, for example, aluminium.

Steel cans were traditionally made of tinplate; the tin coating stopped the contents from rusting the steel. Tinned steel is still used, especially for fruit juices and pale canned fruit. Modern cans are often made from steel lined with transparent films made from assorted plastics, instead of tin. Early cans were often soldered with high-lead solders, which could and did cause lead poisoning.

Cans are highly recyclable, and around 65% of steel cans are recycled.

== History ==
The Dutch are noted as the first to tin food, their Navy being reported as carrying cleaned and brine cooked salmon in tin plated iron boxes as early as 1772. French inventor Nicholas Appert experimented with food preservation in glass containers, in the early 1800s.

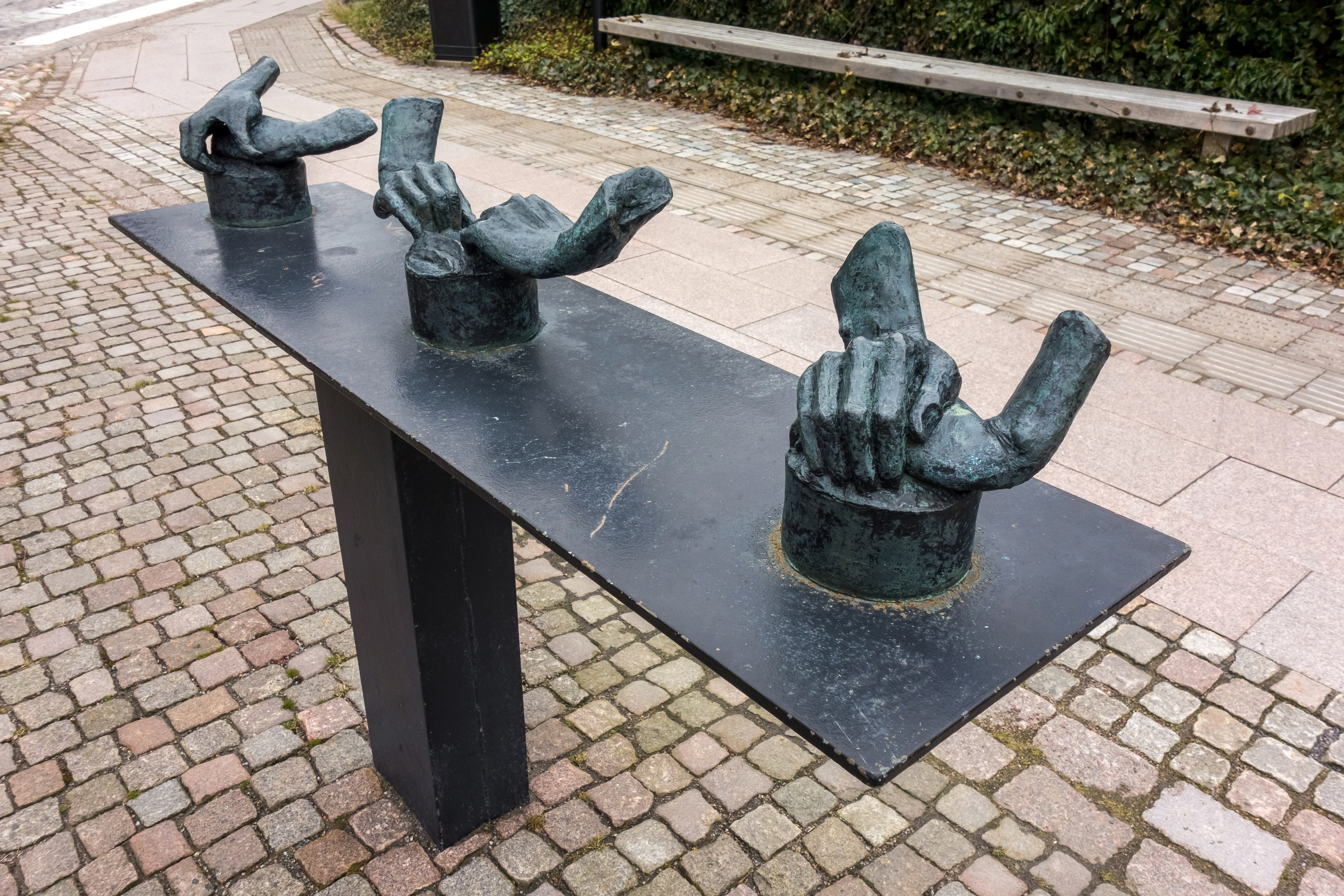
Work of hands, bronze sculpture by Linda Lundgren, dedicated to the workers who filled cans by hand in the fishing industry during the early 20th century, Lysekil, Sweden

Frenchman Philippe de Girard had British merchant Peter Durand obtain an English patent for the process in 1810. Durand did not pursue food canning, but in 1812, sold his patent to two Englishmen, Bryan Donkin and John Hall, who refined the process and product and set up the world's first commercial canning factory on Southwark Park Road, London. By 1813 they were producing their first tin canned goods for the Royal Navy, and by 1820, tin canisters or cans were being used for gunpowder, seeds, and turpentine.

Early tin cans were sealed by soldering with a tin–lead alloy, which could lead to lead poisoning. Automated soldering machines started to arrive in the 1870s and steel started to displace iron as a material for the cans at the very end of the 19th century. Locking side seam was invented by Max Ams in 1888, giving the rise to a "sanitary can" design, where the solder was found only on the outside of the can and never touched the food. The modern three-piece design dates back to 1904 (Sanitary Can Company of New York).

In 1901 in the United States, the American Can Company was founded, at the time producing 90% of the tin cans in the United States. It bought out the Sanitary Can Company of New York in 1908, and the three-piece design displaced all other cans by the early 1920s. The can saw very little change since then, although better technology brought 20% reduction in the use of steel, and 50% - in the use of tin (the modern cans are 99.5% steel).

Canned food in tin cans was already quite popular in various countries when technological advancements in the 1920s lowered the cost of the cans even further. In 1935, the first beer in metal cans was sold; it was an instant sales success. The production of these three-piece cans by the American Can Company stopped for World War II due to lack of material, after the war the first Cone top. The use of aluminum started in 1958 with Primo beer.

About 600 different types of cans were used in the early 21st century, with the most popular being the three-piece design with side seam and two double-seamed ends, followed by the two-piece construction with sides and bottom drawn as one piece.

== Description ==
Most cans are right circular cylinders with identical and parallel round tops and bottoms with vertical sides. However, in cans for small volumes or particularly-shaped contents, the top and bottom may be rounded-corner rectangles or ovals. Other contents may suit a can that is somewhat conical in shape.

Fabrication of most cans results in at least one rim—a narrow ring slightly larger than the outside diameter of the rest of the can. The flat surfaces of rimmed cans are recessed from the edge of any rim (toward the middle of the can) by about the width of the rim; the inside diameter of a rim, adjacent to this recessed surface, is slightly smaller than the inside diameter of the rest of the can.

Three-piece can construction results in top and bottom rims. In two-piece construction, one piece is a flat top and the other a deep-drawn cup-shaped piece that combines the (at least roughly) cylindrical wall and the round base. Transition between wall and base is usually gradual. Such cans have a single rim at the top. Some cans have a separate cover that slides onto the top or is hinged.

Two piece steel cans can be made by "drawing" to form the bottom and sides and adding an "end" at the top: these do not have side seams. Cans can be fabricated with separate slip-on, or friction fit covers and with covers attached by hinges. Various easy opening methods are available.

In the mid-20th century, a few milk products were packaged in nearly rimless cans, reflecting different construction; in this case, one flat surface had a hole (for filling the nearly complete can) that was sealed after filling with a quickly solidifying drop of molten solder. Concern arose that the milk contained unsafe levels of lead leached from this solder plug.

== Advantages of steel cans ==
A number of factors make steel cans useful containers for beverages. Steel cans are stronger than cartons or plastic, and less fragile than glass, protecting the product in transit and preventing leakage or spillage, while also reducing the need for secondary packaging.

Steel and aluminium packaging offer complete protection against light, water and air, and metal cans without resealable closures are among the most tamper-evident of all packaging materials. Food and drink packed in steel cans has equivalent vitamin content to freshly prepared, without needing preserving agents. Steel cans also extend the product's shelf-life, allowing longer sell-by and use-by dates and reducing waste.

As an ambient packaging medium, steel cans do not require cooling in the supply chain, simplifying logistics and storage, and saving energy and cost. At the same time, steel's relatively high thermal conductivity means canned drinks chill much more rapidly and easily than those in glass or plastic bottles.

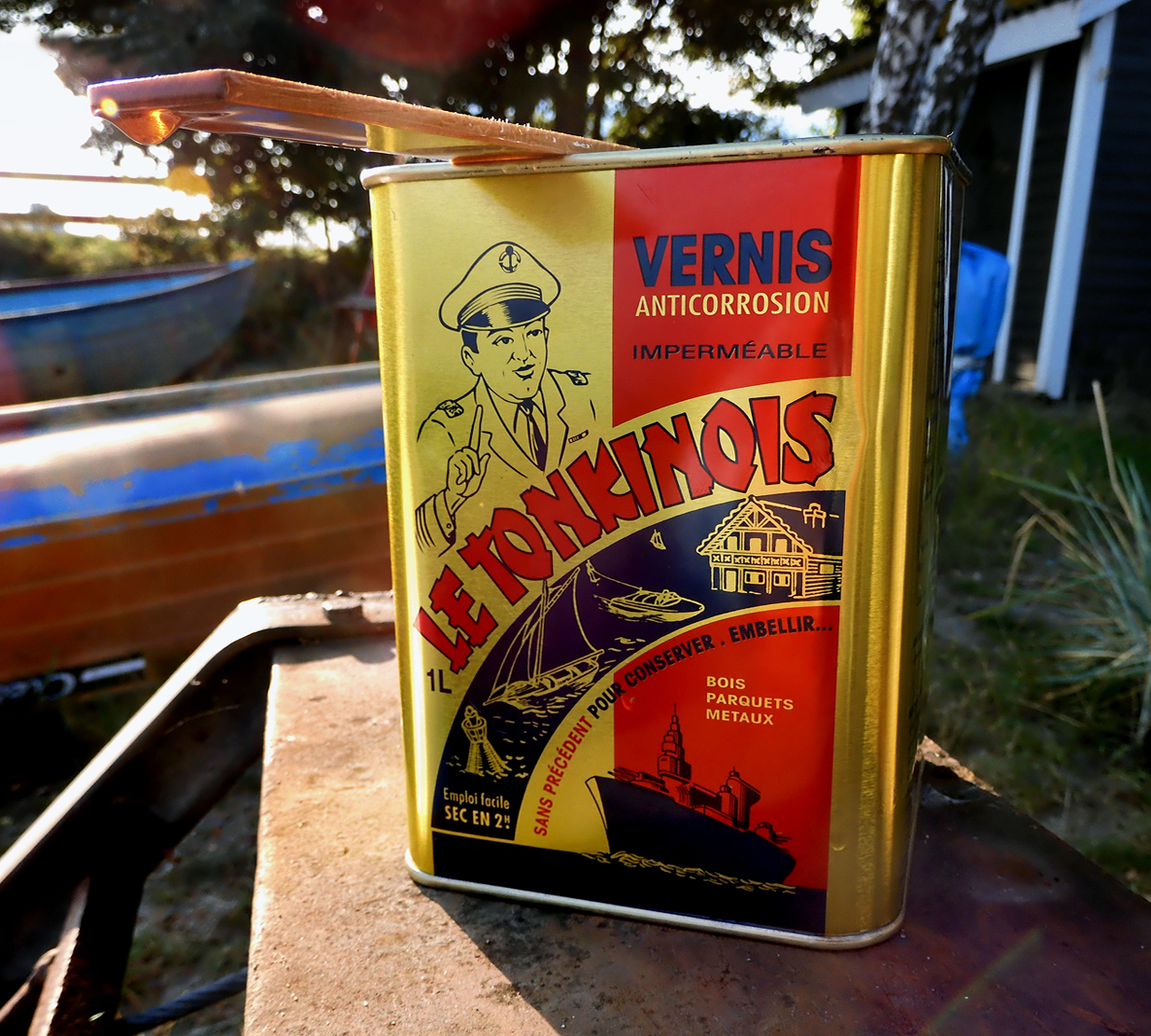
A can of French linseed oil

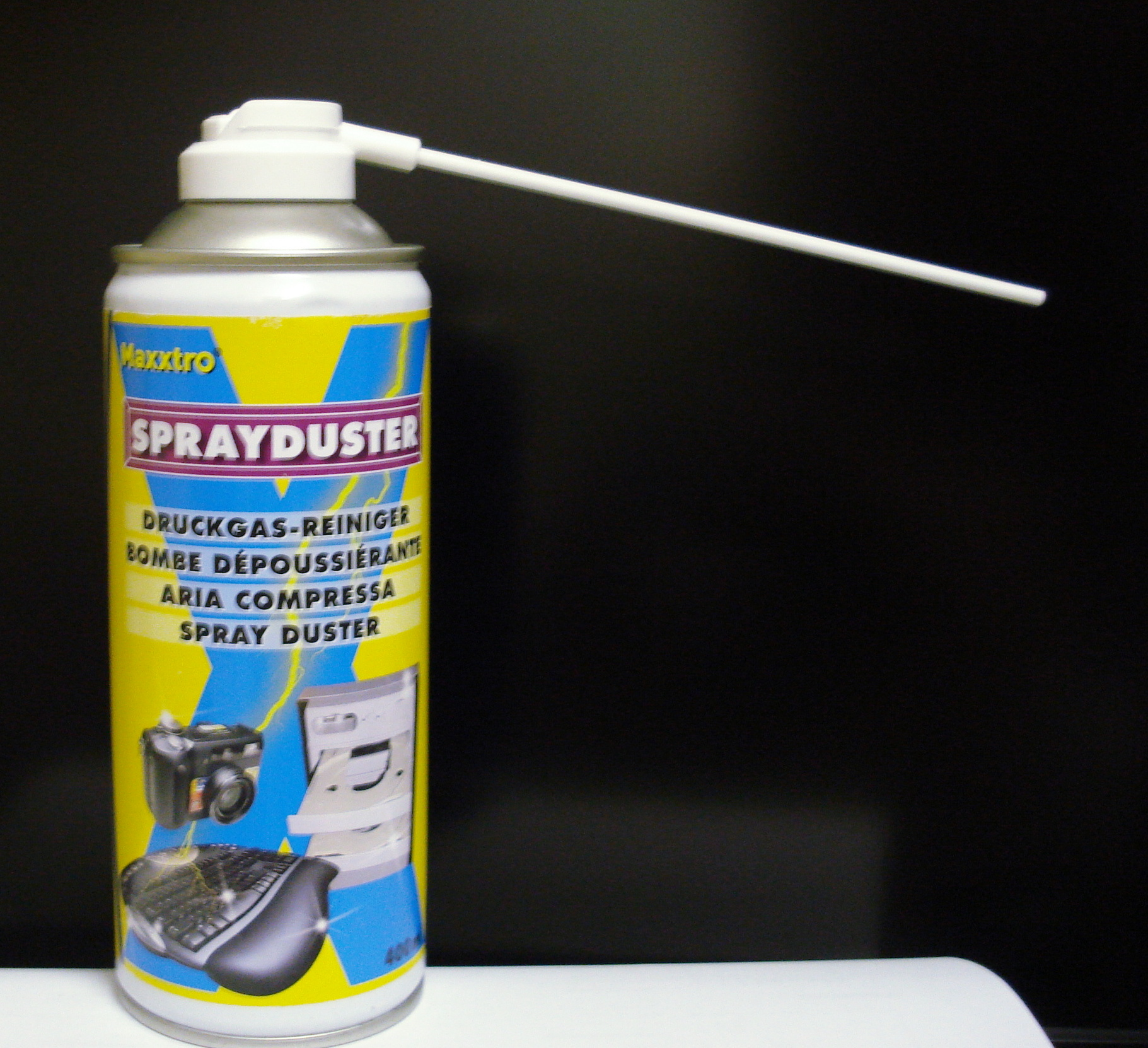
Compressed gas with dispensing valve

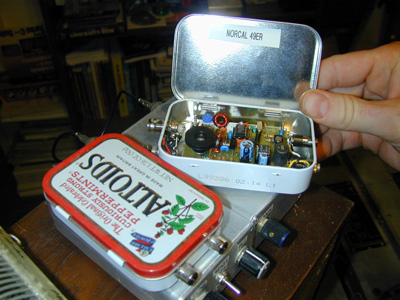
Flip-top can with hinged cover

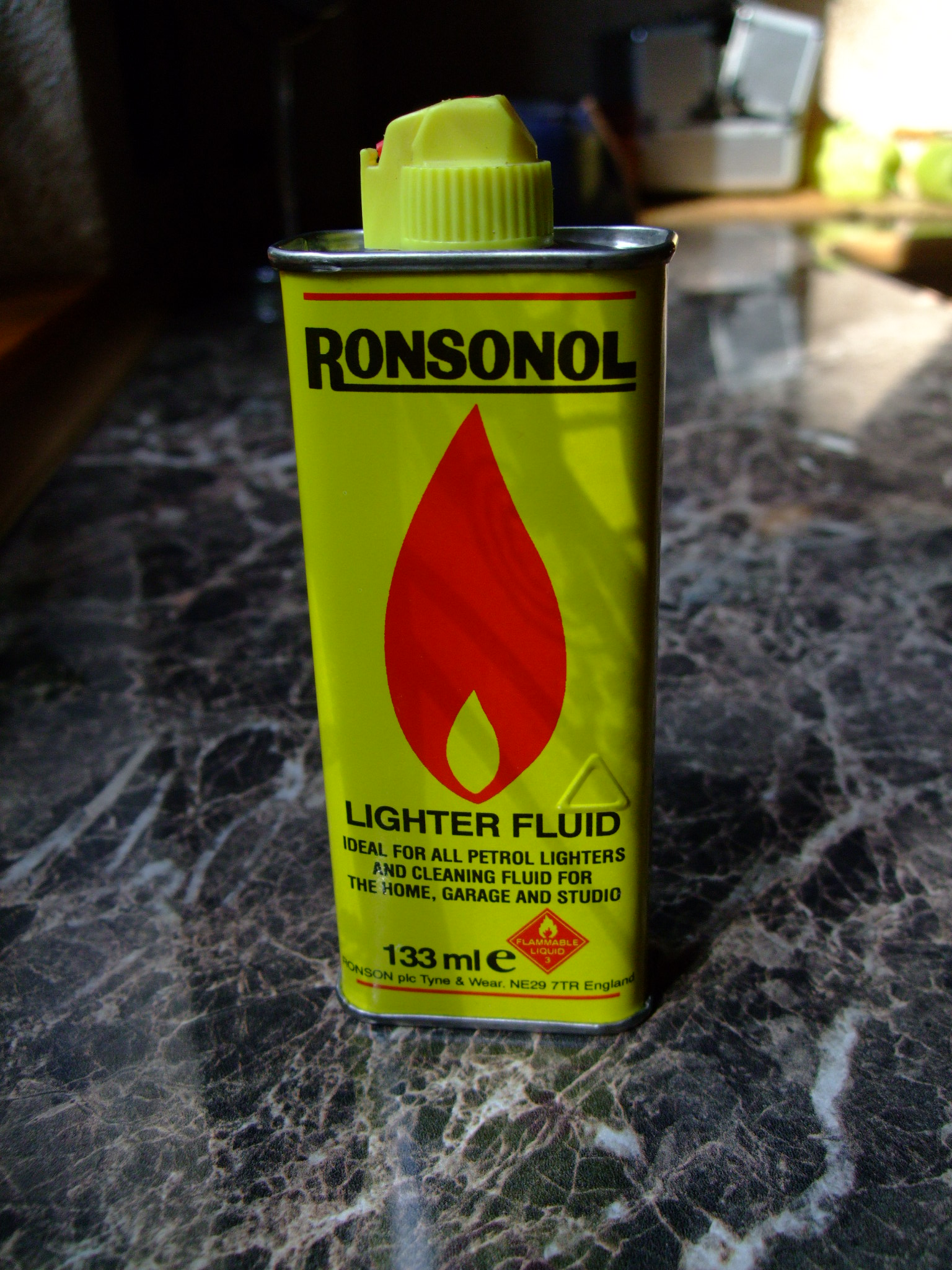
Can of lighter fluid

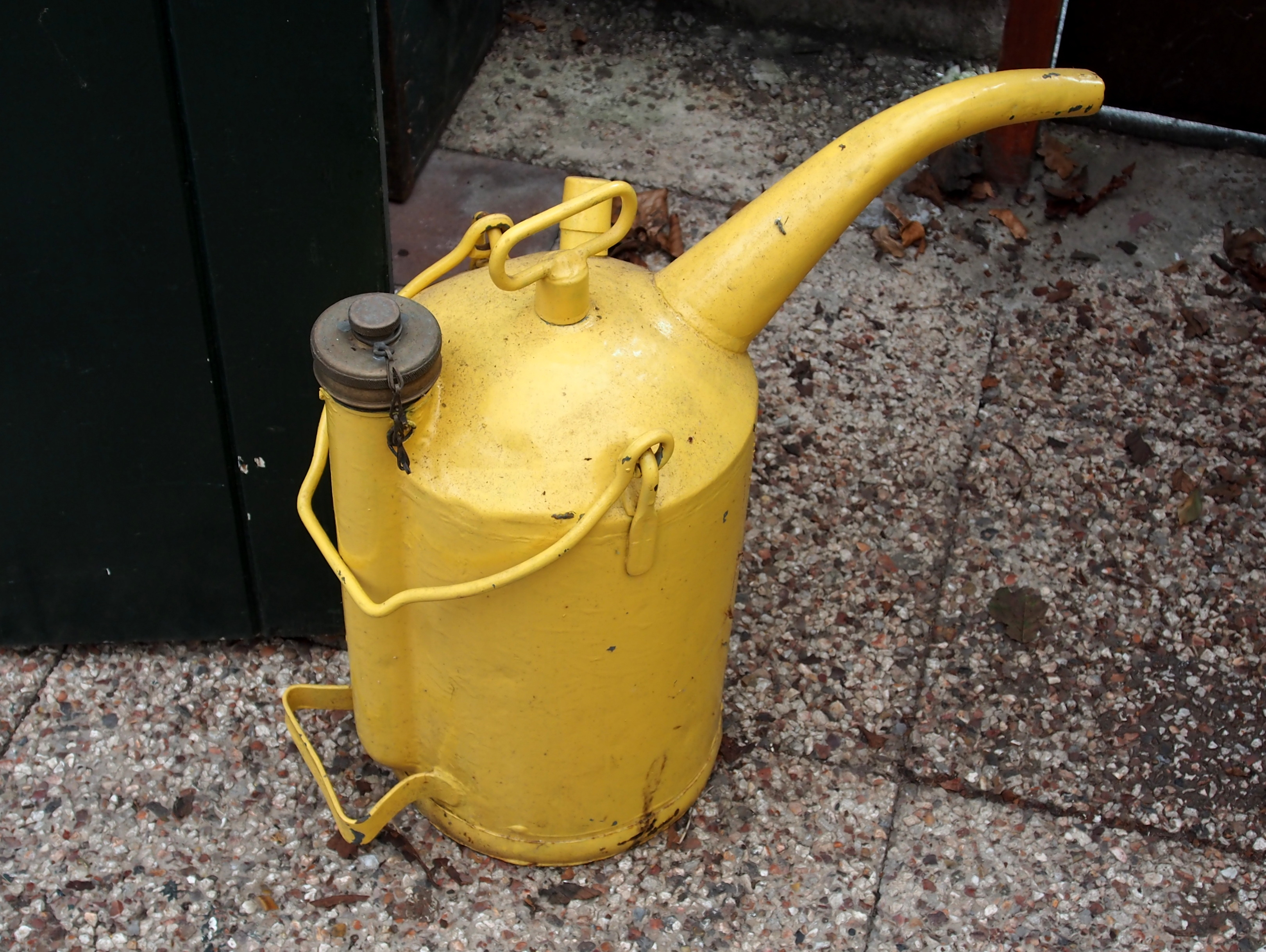
Special can for dispensing oil

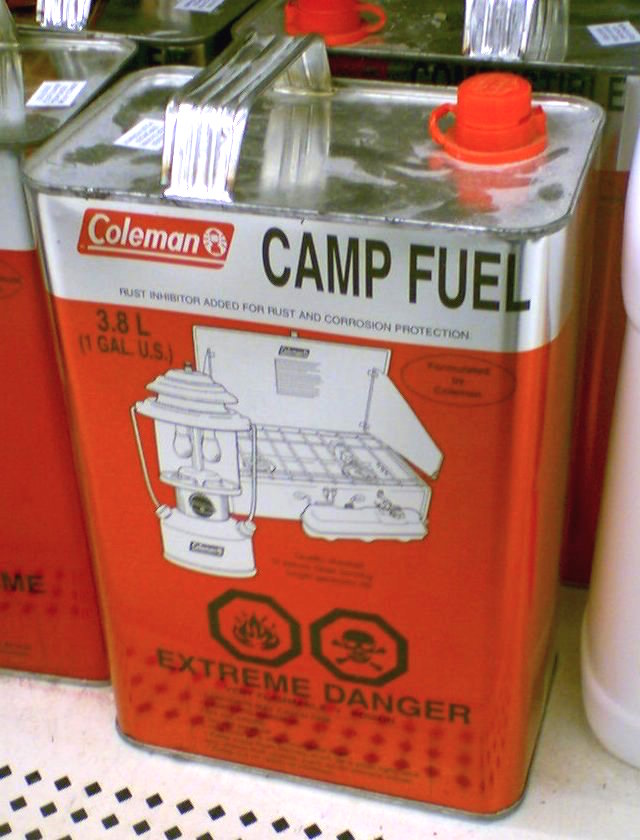
Camp stove fuel in "F-Style" can

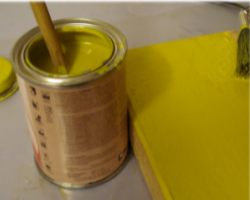
Paint can with double friction cover (plug)

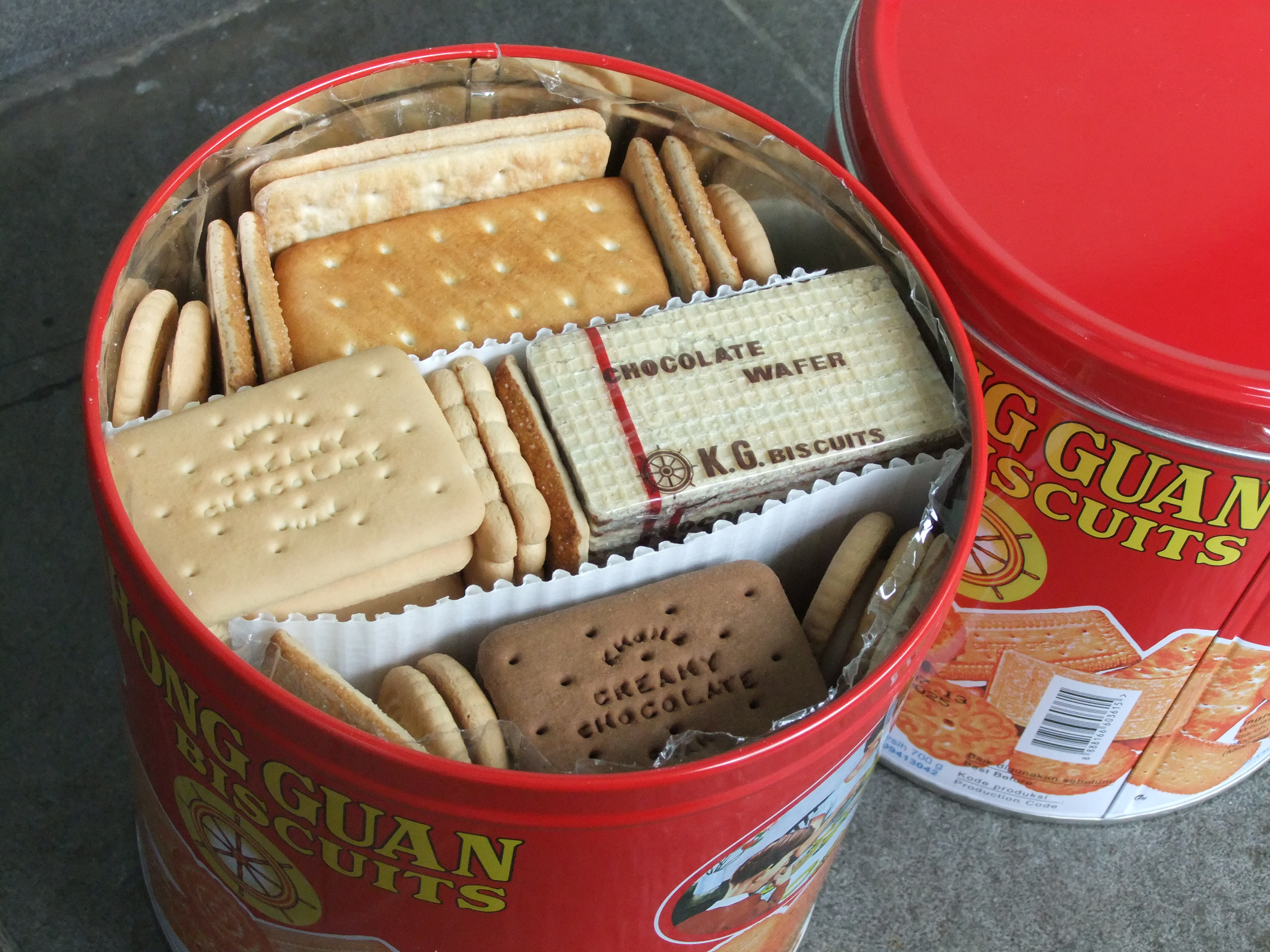
Can with slip-on cover

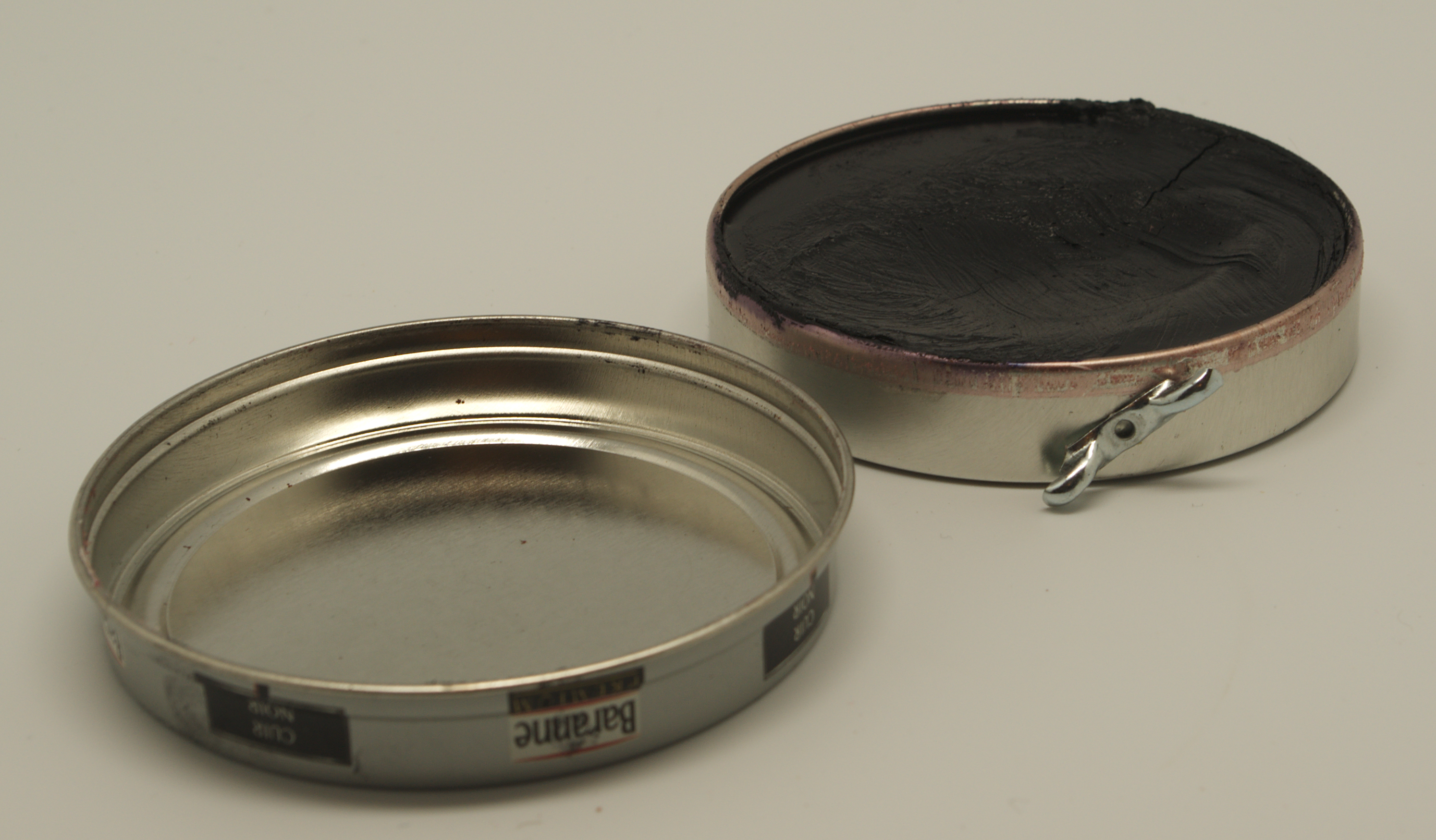
Can of shoe polish

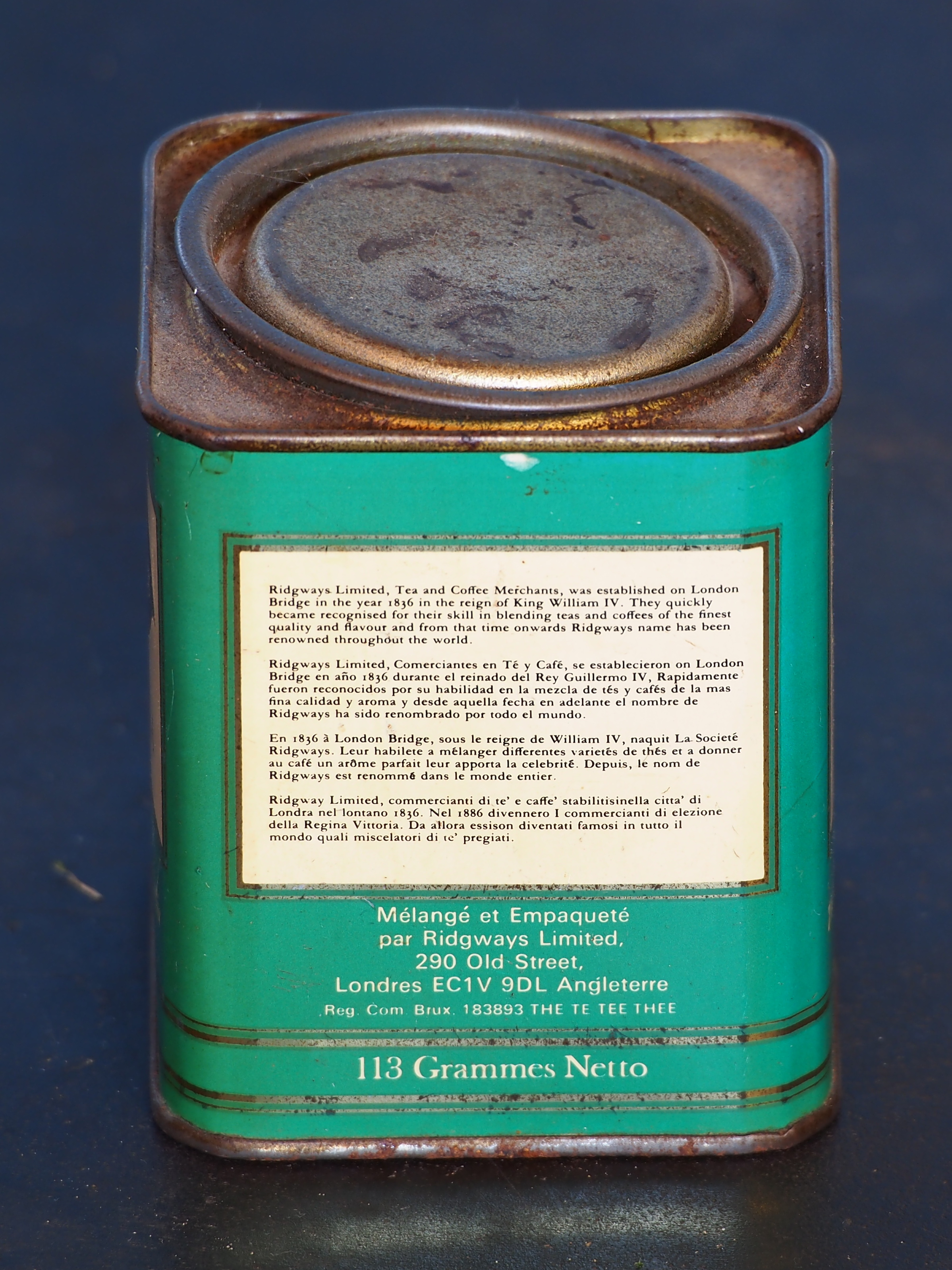
Tea tin

== Materials and health issues ==
=== Tin ===
No cans currently in wide use are composed primarily or wholly of tin. Until the second half of the 20th century, almost all cans were made of tinplate steel. The steel was cheap and structurally strong, but prone to rust; the tin coating prevented the wet food from corroding the steel. Corrosion-resistant coatings on almost all steel food cans are now made from plastic, not tin. Some manufacturers use Vitreous enamel, instead.

==== Dissolution of tin into the food ====
Tin is corrosion resistant, but acidic food like fruits and vegetables can corrode the tin layer. Nausea, vomiting, and diarrhea have been reported after ingesting canned food containing 200 mg/kg of tin. A 2002 study showed that 99.5% of 1,200 tested cans contained below the UK regulatory limit of 200 mg/kg of tin – an improvement over most previous studies, which was largely attributed to the increased use of fully lacquered cans for acidic foods. They concluded that the results do not raise any long term food safety concerns for consumers. The two non-compliant products were voluntarily recalled.

Evidence of tin impurities can sometimes be indicated by discolored food (pears, for example), but lack of color change does not guarantee that a food is not tainted with tin.

=== Lead ===
Lead is harmful to health in any quantity. Infants and children are more severely affected, as lead harms brain development.

In November 1991, US can manufacturers voluntarily eliminated lead seams in food cans. Imported food cans continued to include lead soldered seams.

In 1995, the US FDA issued a rule prohibiting lead soldered food cans, including both domestic and imported food cans.

=== Plastic linings ===
Many metal food cans are lined with plastic, to prevent the food from corroding the can. These linings can leach contaminants into the canned food. Some of these contaminants are substances with known health harms, though whether they are ingested in canned food in levels sufficient to cause harms is not known.

Among other substances, the plastic linings in food cans often contain bisphenol A (BPA). Pregnant women who eat more canned food have higher levels of BPA in their urine.

Other constituents in can linings, including newer BPA-free can linings, have also been identified as having known health harms.

==== Bisphenol-A ====
The chemical compound Bisphenol A found in can linings "...is associated with organizational changes in the prostate, breast, testis, mammary glands, body size, brain structure and chemistry, and behavior of laboratory animals", unborn children and adults.

Bisphenol-A (BPA) is a controversial chemical compound present in commercially available tin can plastic linings and transferred to canned food. The inside of the can is coated with an epoxy coating, in an attempt to prevent food or beverage from coming into contact with the metal. The longer food is in a can, and the warmer and more acidic it is, the more BPA leaches into it. In September 2010, Canada became the first country to declare BPA a toxic substance. In the European Union and Canada, BPA use is banned in baby bottles. The FDA does not regulate BPA (see BPA controversy#Public health regulatory history in the United States). Several companies, like Campbell's Soup, announced plans to eliminate BPA from the linings of their cans, but have not said which chemical they plan to replace it with. (See BPA controversy#Chemical manufacturers reactions to bans.)

==== Canada ====
In 2016, BPA was common in food can linings in Canada. As of August 2008, Health Canada's Food Directorate concluded that "the current dietary exposure to BPA through food packaging uses is not expected to pose a health risk to the general population, including newborns and infants". They also stated that, as some animal studies had shown effects from low levels of BPA, they were seeking to make BPA levels in food packaged for infants and newborns (especially formula). They also cited a WHO review.

==== UK ====
In modern times, the majority of food cans in the UK have been lined with a plastic coating containing bisphenol A (BPA). The coating prevents acids and other substances from corroding the tin or aluminium of the can, but leaching of BPA into the cans contents was investigated as a potential health hazard. The UK Food Standards agency currently considers can-derived BPA levels to be acceptable, but is investigating its safe-level thresholds; it currently has a temporary threshold for BPA, as of 2024.

==== US ====
A 2016 market survey using Fourier-transform infrared spectrums to identify materials, found BPA and other substances known to have health harms were common in food can linings in the US. A similar survey done by food can manufacturers in 2020 found BPA only in some imported cans; it did not discuss potential harms from lining substances other than BPA.

=== Labels ===
A can traditionally has a printed label glued to the outside of the curved surface, indicating its contents. Some labels contain additional information, such as recipes, on the reverse side. Labels are sometimes printed directly onto the metal before or after the metal sheet is formed into the individual cans.

Traditionally, labels were glued on with casein glue, which dissolved easily in hot water. Some other glues may make the label harder to remove for recycling.

== Standard sizes ==
Cans come in a variety of shapes and sizes. Walls are often stiffened with rib bulges, especially on larger cans, to help the can resist dents that can cause seams to split.

Can sizes in the United States have an assortment of designations and sizes. For example, size 7/8 contains one serving of half a cup with an estimated weight of 4 ounces; size 1 "picnic" has two or three servings totalling one and a quarter cups with an estimated weight of 10 1/2 ounces; size 303 has four servings totalling 2 cups weighing 15 1/2 ounces; and size 10 cans, most widely used by food services selling to cafeterias and restaurants, have twenty-five servings totalling 13 cups with an estimated weight of 103 1/2 ounces (size of a roughly 3 pound coffee can). These are U.S. customary cups, not British Imperial standard.

In the United States, cook books sometimes reference cans by size. The Can Manufacturers Institute defines these sizes, expressing them in three-digit numbers, as measured in whole and sixteenths of an inch for the container's nominal outside dimensions: a 307 × 512 would thus measure 3 and 7/16" in diameter by 5 and 3/4" (12/16") in height. Older can numbers are often expressed as single digits, their contents being calculated for room-temperature water as approximately eleven ounces (#1 "picnic" can), twenty ounces (#2), thirty-two ounces (#3), fifty-eight ounces (#5), and one-hundred-ten ounces (#10 "coffee" can).

| Can Name | Dimensions (diameter × height) (inches) | Capacity (U.S. fluid ounces) | No. 2 can equivalent | Typical products |
|---|---|---|---|---|
| 6Z | 2 2/16 × 3 1/2 | 6.08 | 0.295 | Tomato paste |
| 8Z Short | 2 11/16 × 3 | 7.93 | 0.386 | Chipotle peppers |
| 8Z Tall | 2 11/16 × 3 2/8 | 8.68 | 0.422 | |
| No. I (Picnic) | 2 11/16 × 4 | 10.94 | 0.532 | Mandarin oranges |
| No. 211 Cylinder | 2 11/16 × 4 14/16 | 13.56 | 0.660 | Condensed milk |
| No. 300 | 3 × 4 7/16 | 15.22 | 0.741 | Cranberry Sauce, Pork & Beans |
| No. 300 Cylinder | 3 × 5 9/16 | 19.40 | 0.945 | |
| No. I Tall | 3 1/16 × 4 11/16 | 16.70 | 0.813 | |
| No. 303 | 3 3/16 × 4 3/8 | 16.88 | 0.821 | Fruits, Vegetables, Soups |
| No. 303 Cylinder | 3 3/16 × 5 9/16 | 21.86 | 1.060 | |
| No. 2 Vacuum | 3 7/16 × 3 3/8 | 14.71 | 0.716 | |
| No. 2 | 3 7/16 × 4 9/16 | 20.55 | 1.000 | Juices, Soups, Vegetables |
| Jumbo | 3 7/16 × 5 5/8 | 25.80 | 1.2537 | |
| No. 2 Cylinder | 3 7/16 × 5 6/8 | 26.40 | 1.284 | |
| No. 1.25 | 4 1/16 × 2 3/8 | 13.81 | 0.672 | |
| No. 2.5 | 4 1/16 × 4 11/16 | 29.79 | 1.450 | Fruits, Vegetables |
| No. 3 Vacuum | 4 1/4 × 3 7/16 | 23.90 | 1.162 | |
| No. 3 Cylinder | 4 1/4 × 7 | 51.70 | 2.515 | |
| No. 5 | 5 1/8 × 5 5/8 | 59.10 | 2.8744 | Fruit Juice, Soups |
| No. 10 | 6 3/16 × 7 | 109.43 | 5.325 | Fruits, Vegetables |

In parts of the world using the metric system, tins are made in 250, 500, 750 ml (millilitre) and 1 L (litre) sizes (250 ml is approximately 1 cup or 8 ounces). Cans imported from the US often have odd sizes such as 3.8 L (1 US gallon), 1.9 L (1/2 US gallon), and 946 ml (2 US pints / 1 quart).

In the UK and Australia, cans are usually measured by net weight. A standard size tin can holds roughly 400 g; though the weight can vary between 385 g and 425 g depending on the density of the contents. The smaller half sized can holds roughly 200 g, typically varying between 170 g and 225 g.

== Fabrication of cans ==
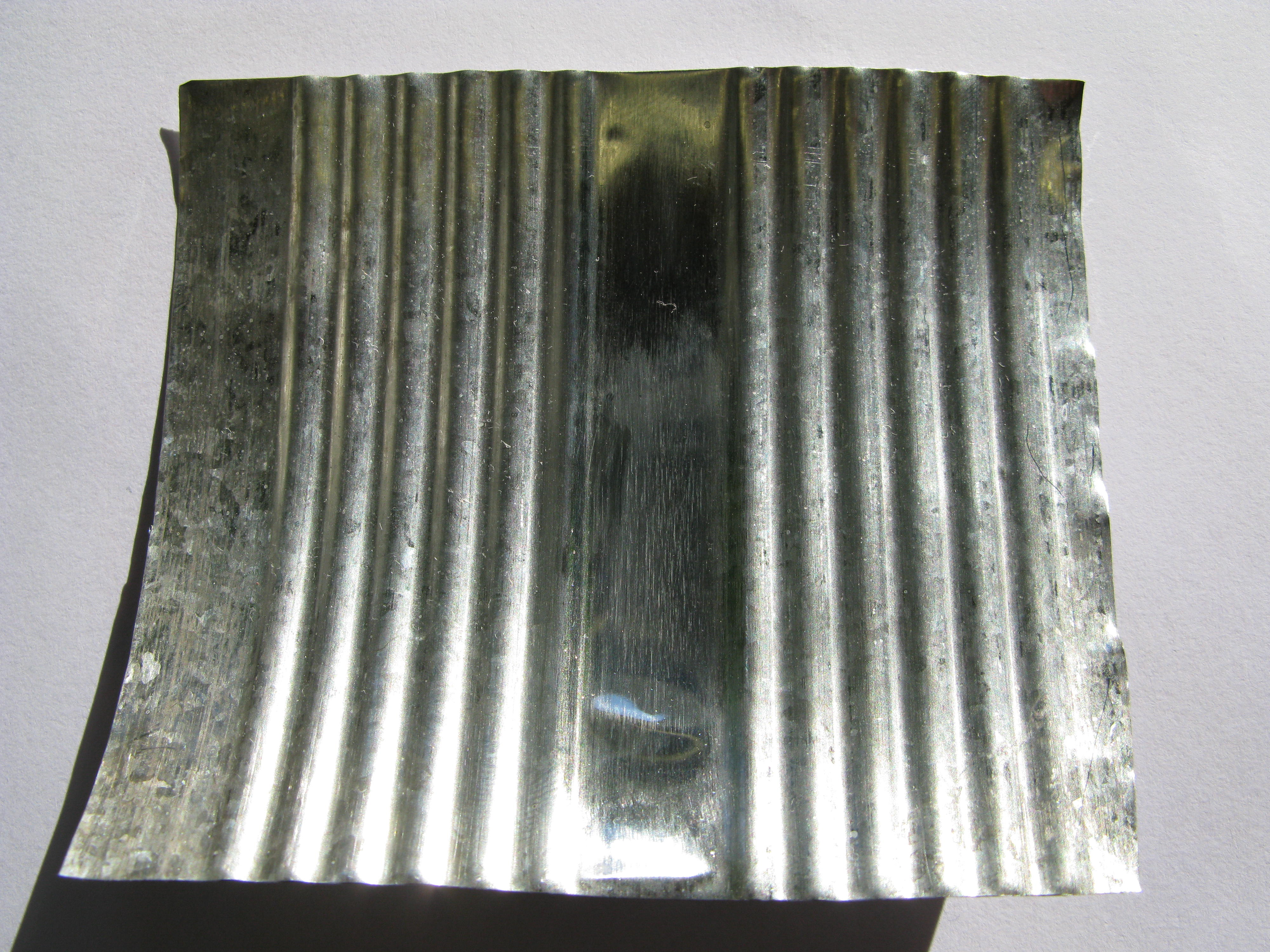
Inside of a tin can

Rimmed three-piece can construction involves several stages;

- Forming a tube and welding or soldering the seam of the sides.
- Joining the bottom end to the tube.
- Printing or attaching labels to the can.
- Filling the can with content; sterilization or retorting is required for many food products.
- Joining the wall and top "end".

Double seam rims are crucial to the joining of the wall to a top or bottom surface. An extremely tight fit between the pieces must be accomplished to prevent leakage; the process of accomplishing this radically deforms the rims of the parts. Part of the tube that forms the wall is bent, almost at its end, turning outward through 90 degrees, and then bent further, toward the middle of the tube, until it is parallel to the rest of the tube, a total bend of 180 degrees.

The outer edge of the flat piece is bent against this toward the middle of the tubular wall, until parallel with the wall, turning inward through 90 degrees. The edge of bent portion is bent further through another 90 degrees, inward now toward the axis of the tube and parallel to the main portion of the flat piece, making a total bend of 180 degrees. It is bent far enough inward that its circular edge is now slightly smaller in diameter than the edge of the tube. Bending it yet further, until it is parallel with the tube's axis, gives it a total bend of 270 degrees. It now envelops the outward rim of the tube.

Looking outward from the axis of the tube, the first surface is the unbent portion of the tube. Slightly further out is a narrow portion of the top, including its edge. The outward-bent portion of the tube, including its edge, is still slightly further out. Furthest out is the 90-degree-bent portion of the flat surface.

The combined interacting forces, as the portion of the flat surface adjacent to the interior of the tube is indented toward the middle of the tube and then outward forward the axis of the tube, and the other bent portions of the flat piece and the tube are all forced toward the axis of the tube, drives these five thicknesses of metal against each other from inside and out, forming a "dry" joint so tight that welding or solder is not needed to strengthen or seal it. Illustrations of this process can be found on pages 20–22 of the FAO Fisheries Technical Paper 285 "Manual on fish canning".

== Design and manufacture ==
=== Steel for can making ===
The majority of steel used in packaging is tinplate, which is steel that has been coated with a thin layer of tin, whose functionality is required for the production process. The tin layer is usually applied by electroplating.

=== Two-piece steel can design ===
Most steel beverage cans are two-piece designs, made from 1) a disc re-formed into a cylinder with an integral end, double-seamed after filling and 2) a loose end to close it. Steel cans are made in many different diameters and volumes, with opening mechanisms that vary from ring pulls and tab openers, to wide open mouths.

=== Drawn-and-ironed (DWI) steel cans ===
The process of re-forming sheet metal without changing its thickness is known as 'drawing'. Thinning the walls of a two-piece can by passing it through circular dies is called 'ironing'. Steel beverage cans are therefore generally referred to as drawn-and-ironed, or DWI, cans (sometimes D&I). The DWI process is used for making cans where the height is greater than the diameter, and is particularly suited to making large volumes of cans of the same basic specification.

Steel can wall thicknesses are now 30% thinner and weigh 40% less than 30 years ago, reducing the amounts of raw materials and energy required to make them. They are also up to 40% thinner than aluminium.

=== Magnetic properties ===
Carbon steel is magnetic. For beverage packaging this is unique. This allows the use of magnetic conveyor systems to transfer empty cans through the filling and packing processes, increasing accuracy and reducing potential spillage and waste. In recycling facilities, steel cans may be readily separated from other waste using magnetic equipment including cross-belt separators, also known as overband magnets, and drum magnets.

== Opening cans ==
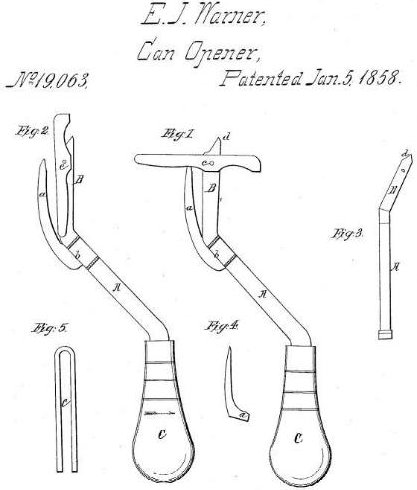
Ezra Warner's can opener

The first cans were heavy-weight containers that required considerable force to open, with instructions directing to use a hammer and chisel; during the war of 1812, British soldiers resorted to bayonets and knives to get them open. After an introduction of much thinner cans in the 1850s, specialized opening tools became a practical possibility, and were introduced in 1855 (Robert Yeates) and 1858 (Ezra J. Warner). The latter unwieldy design saw limited use by soldiers in the American Civil War. A push-lever opener similar to modern ones was introduced in 1860 ("Bull's Head"), and one with a cutting wheel was invented in 1870 (William W. Lyman). A serrated wheel, which became common in rotating can openers, was first used by the Star Can Opener Company in 1925.

While beverage cans or cans of liquid such as broth can be punctured—as with a church key—to pour out the contents, solid or semisolid contents require removing one end of the can. This can be accomplished with a heavy knife or other sharp tool, but can openers are safer, easier, and more convenient.

Some cans, such as those used for sardines, have a specially scored lid so that the user can break out the metal by the leverage of winding it around a slotted twist-key. Until the mid-20th century, some sardine tins had solder-attached lids, and the twist-key worked by forcing the solder joint apart.

The advent of pull tabs in beverage cans spread to the canning of various food products, such as pet food and nuts (and non-food products such as motor oil and tennis balls). The ends are known as easy open lids because they open without any tools or implements. An additional innovation developed specifically for food cans uses a tab that is bent slightly upwards, creating a larger surface area for easier finger access.

Cans can be made with easy open features. Some cans have screw caps for pouring liquids and resealing. Some have hinged covers or slip-on covers for easy access. Paint cans usually have a lid with an interference fit, removable and replaceable any number of times so the paint may be stored between uses.

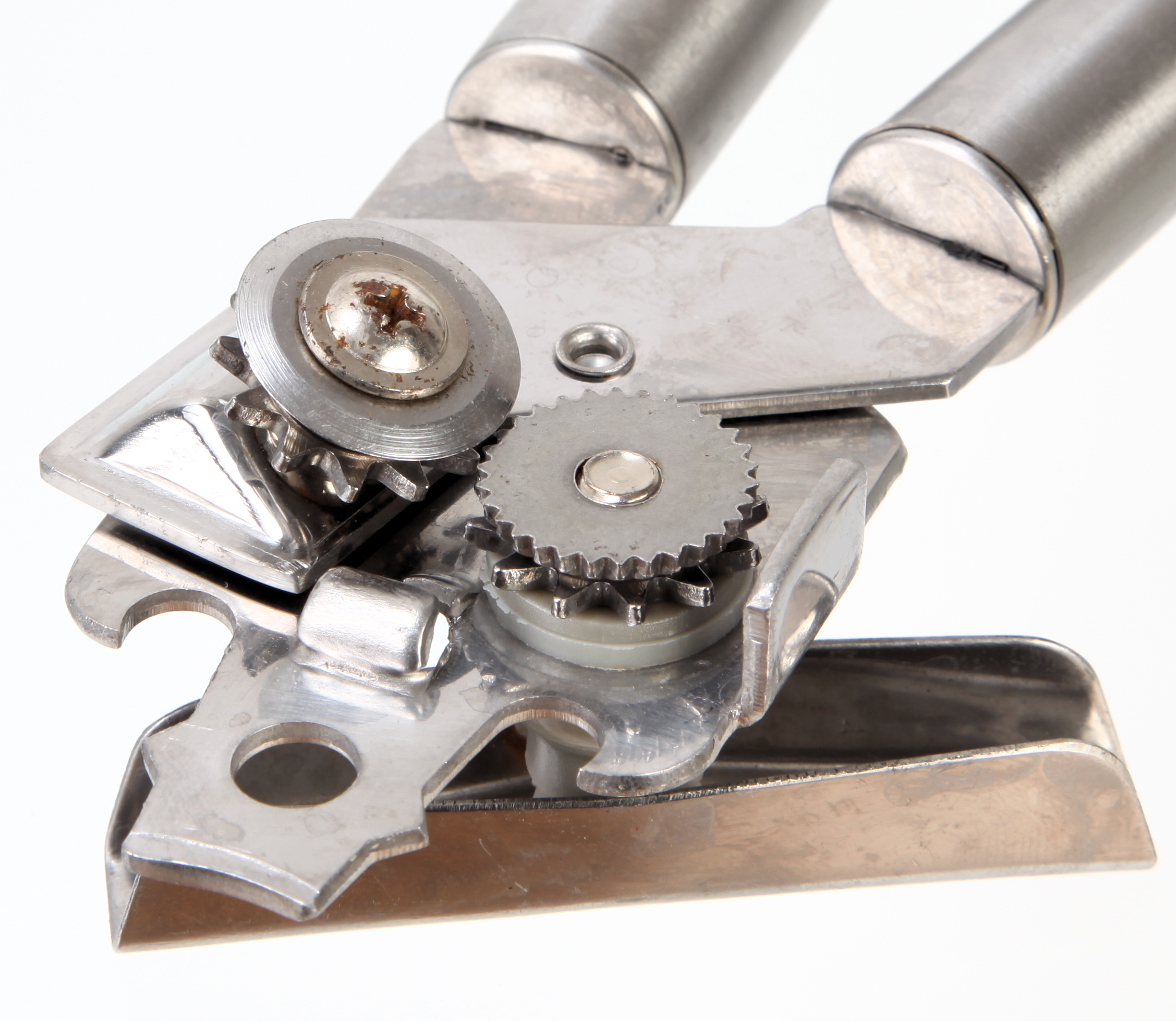
Mechanism of a can opener

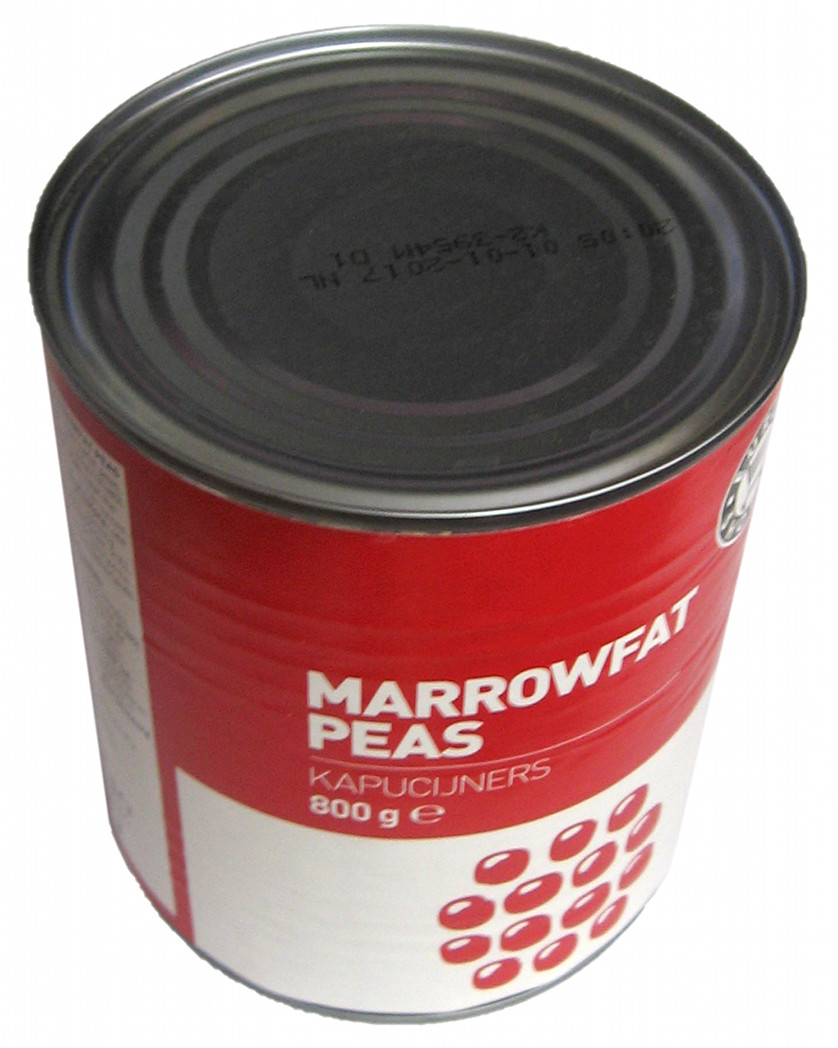
Can that requires a can opener

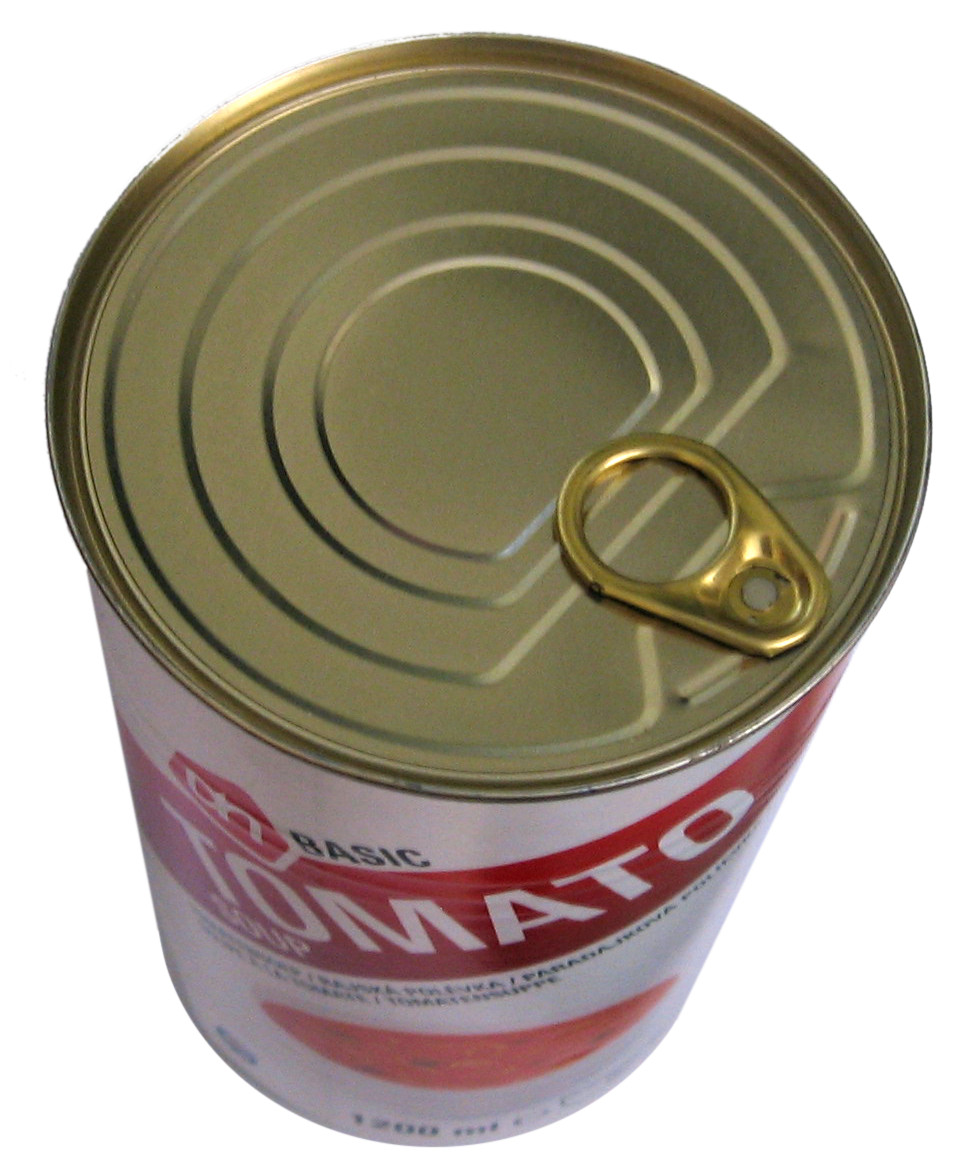
Soup can with a ring-pull tab

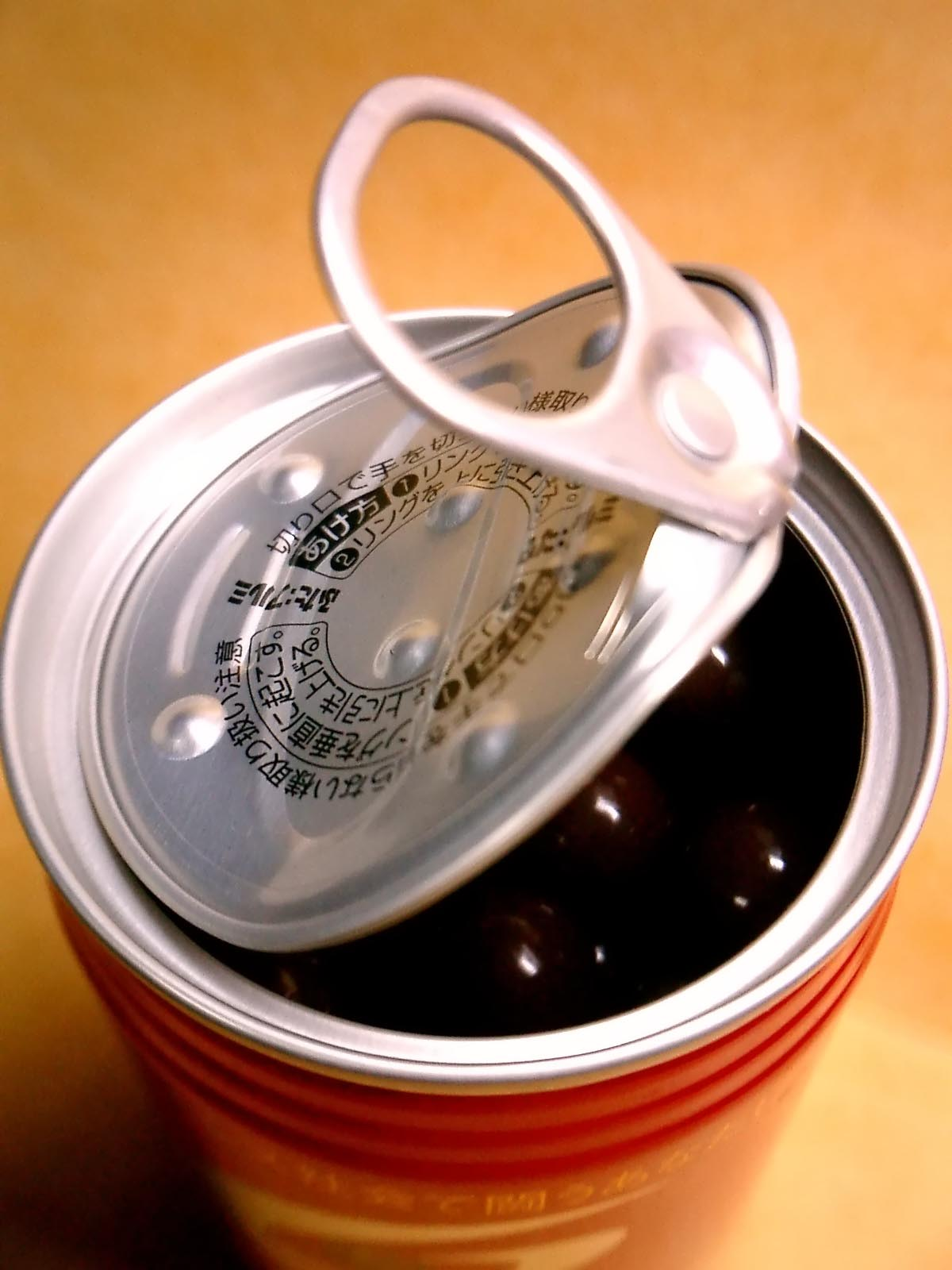
Opened can with a ring-pull tab

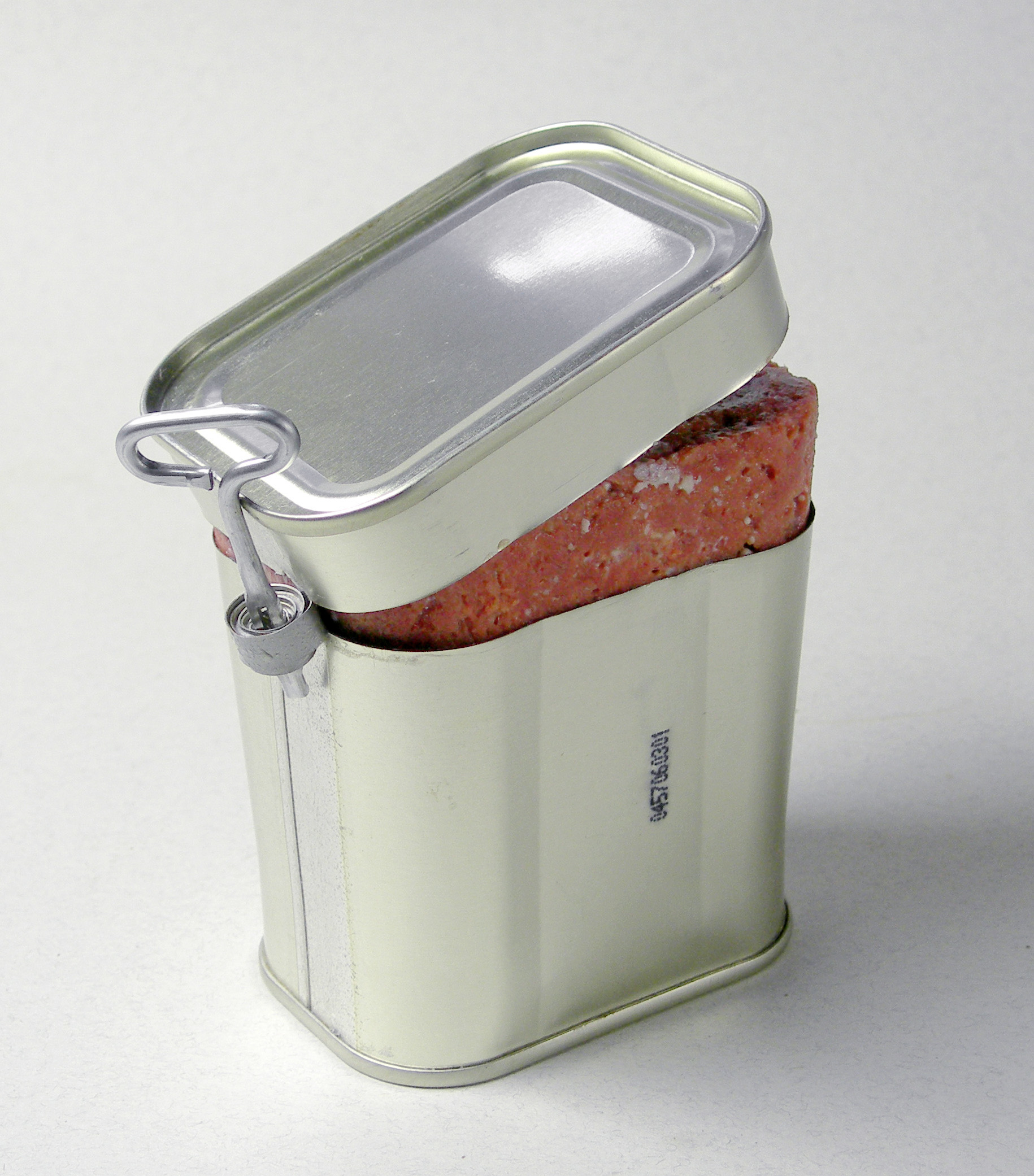
Keyed side opening

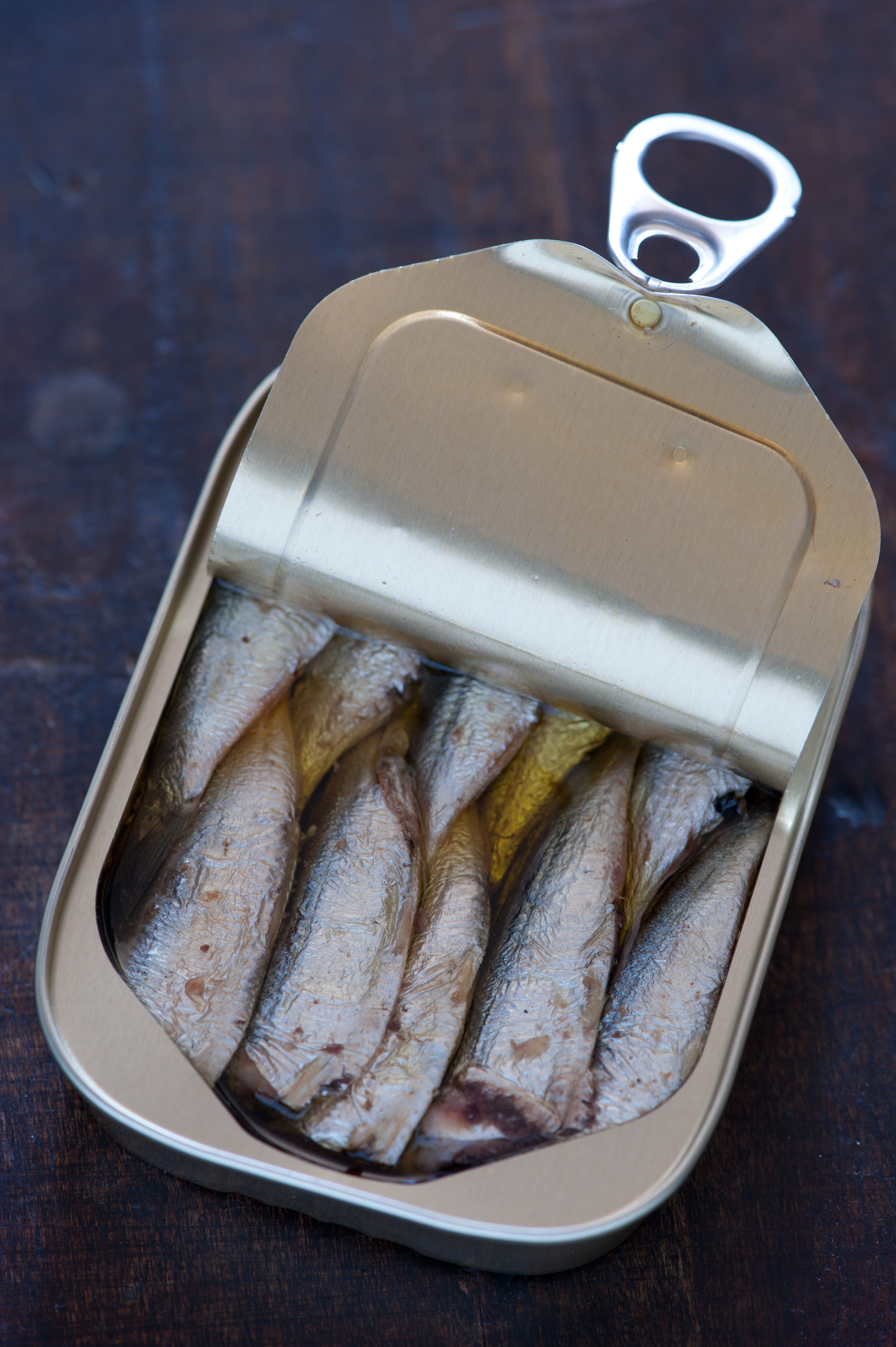
Easy open sardine can

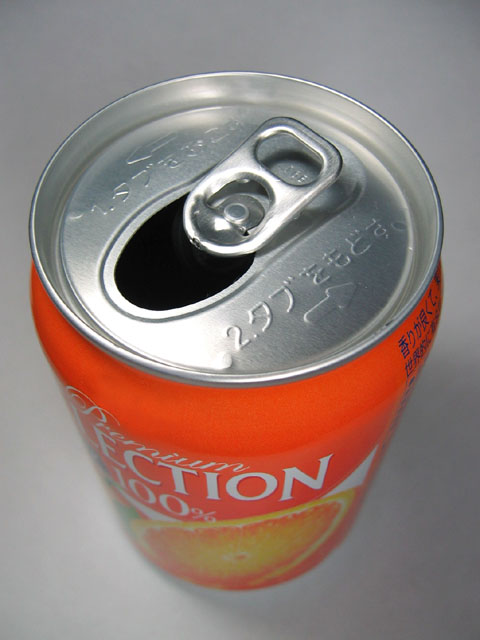
Stay-on tab

== Recycling and re-use ==
Steel from cans and other sources is the most recycled packaging material. Around 65% of steel cans are recycled. In the United States, 63% of steel cans are recycled, compared to 52% of aluminium cans. In Europe, the recycling rate in 2016 is 79.5%. Most can recycling occurs at the smelters, but individual consumers also directly reuse cans in various ways. For instance people can create functional and decorative items for their home, from organizing tools to making garden decor.

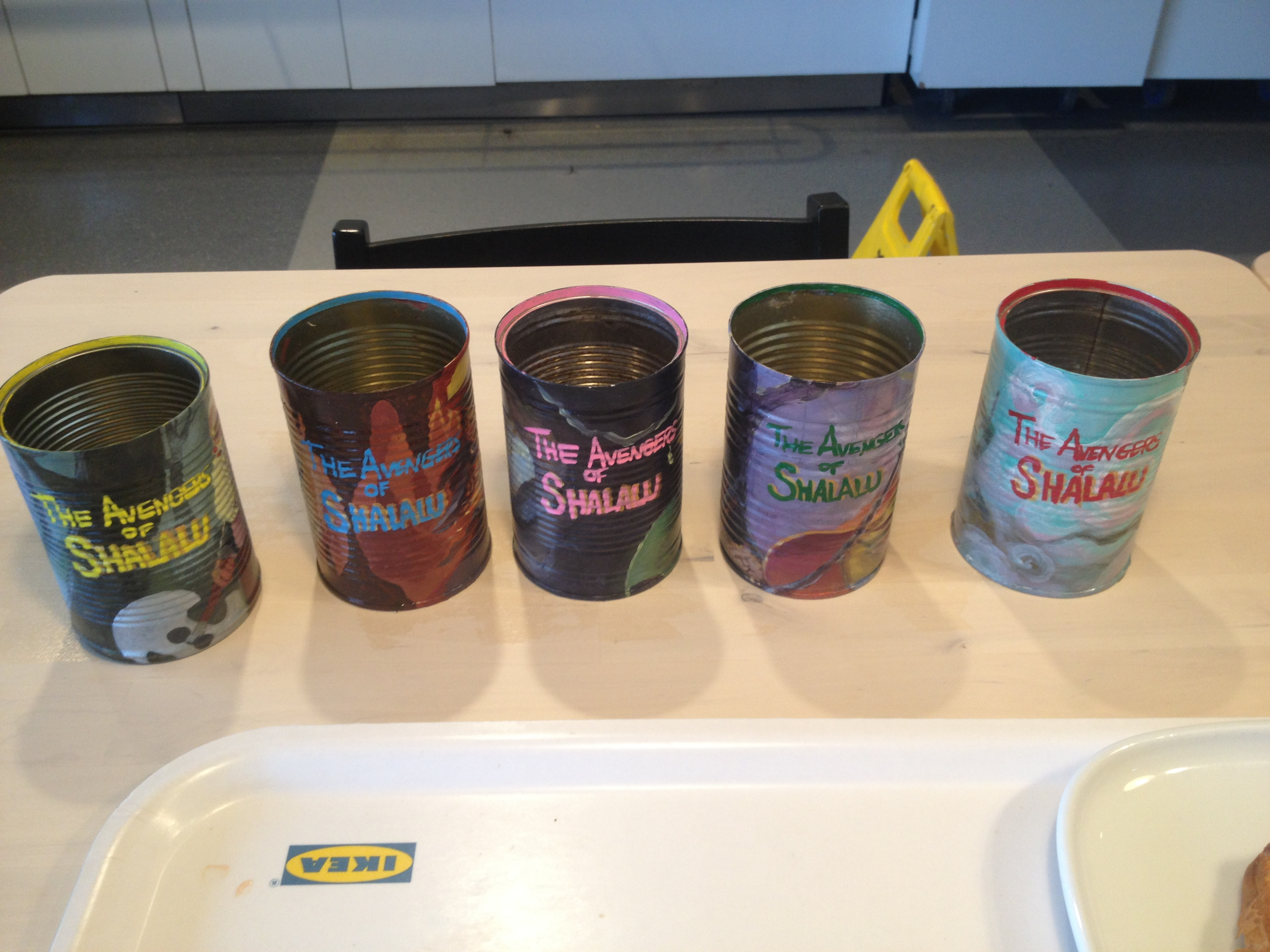
Food tin cans reused for art and storage

=== Sustainability and recycling of steel beverage cans ===
==== Steel recycling ====
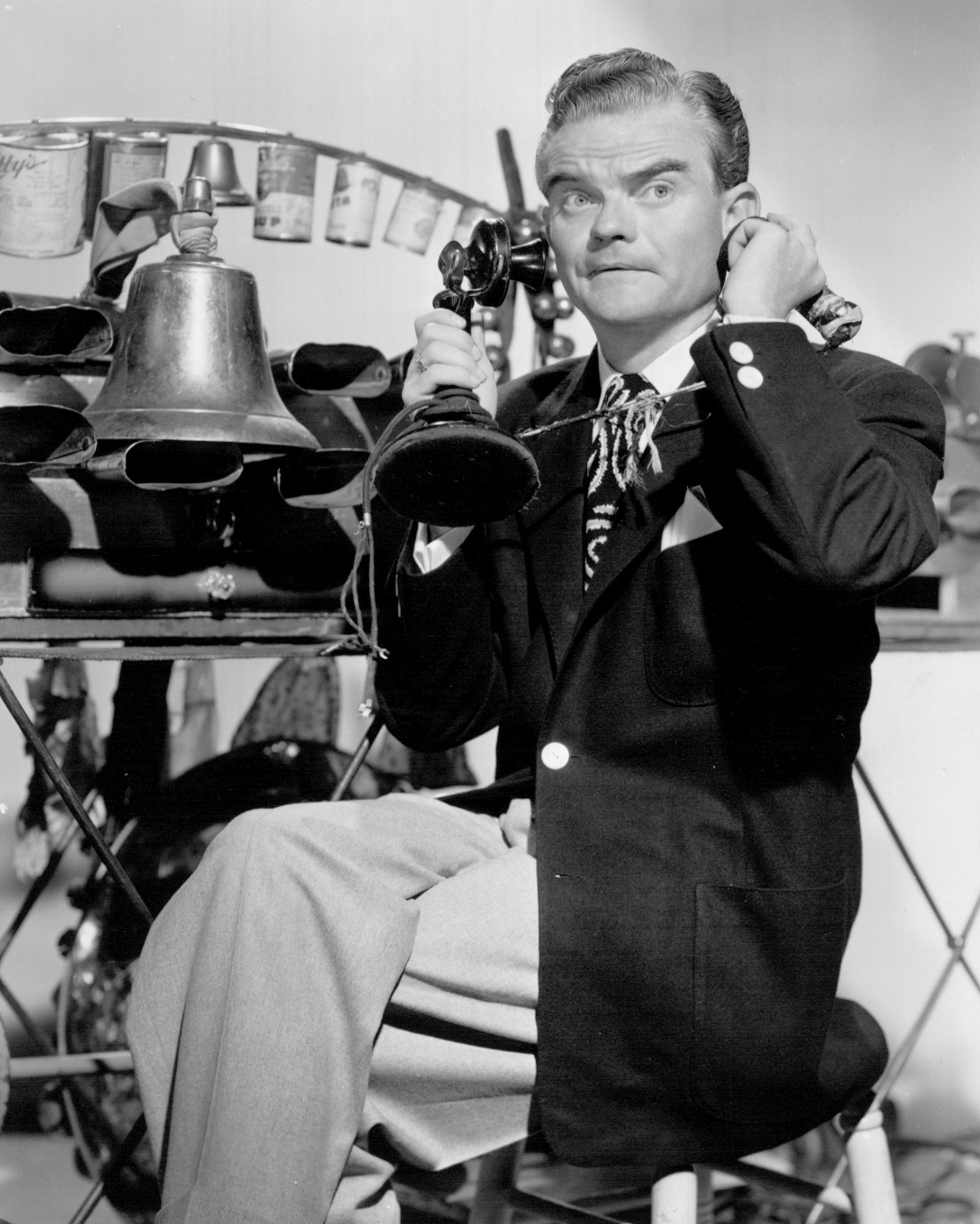
Spike Jones with tin cans in the background

From an ecological perspective, steel may be regarded as a closed-loop material: post-consumer waste can be collected, recycled and used to make new cans or other products. Each tonne of scrap steel recycled saves 1.5 tonnes of CO_{2}, 1.4 tonnes of iron ore and 740 kg of coal. Steel is the world's most recycled material, with more than 85% of all the world's steel products being recycled at the end of their life: an estimated 630 million tonnes of steel scrap were recycled in 2017, saving 945 million tonnes of CO_{2}.

==== Steel can recycling ====
A steel can can be recycled again and again without loss of quality; however, for the food grade steel it's required to remove tin from the scrap metal, which is done by way of electrochemistry: the tin is leached from a high pH solution at low negative voltage.

Recycling a single can saves the equivalent power for one laundry load, 1 hour of TV or 24 hours of lighting (10W LED bulb).

Steel beverage cans are recycled by being melted down in an electric arc furnace or basic oxygen furnace.

Most steel cans also carry some form of recycling identification such as the Metal Recycles Forever mark, Recyclable Steel, and the Choose Steel campaign logo. There is also a campaign in Europe called Every Can Counts, encouraging can recycling in the workplace.

==== Smaller carbon footprint ====
All beverage packaging creates CO_{2} emissions at every stage in the production process, from raw material extraction, processing and manufacture through to recycling. However, steel cans are an ecological top performer, as cans can always be recycled. The steel industry needs the used cans and will use them in the production of new steel product. By recycling the cans and closing the loop, CO_{2} emissions are dramatically reduced. There is also the potential for higher global steel recycling rates as consumers become more aware of the benefits.

== See also ==
- Albion metal
- Can collecting
- Drink can
- Oil can
- Tin box
- Tin can wall
