= Can opener =

Device used to open metal cans

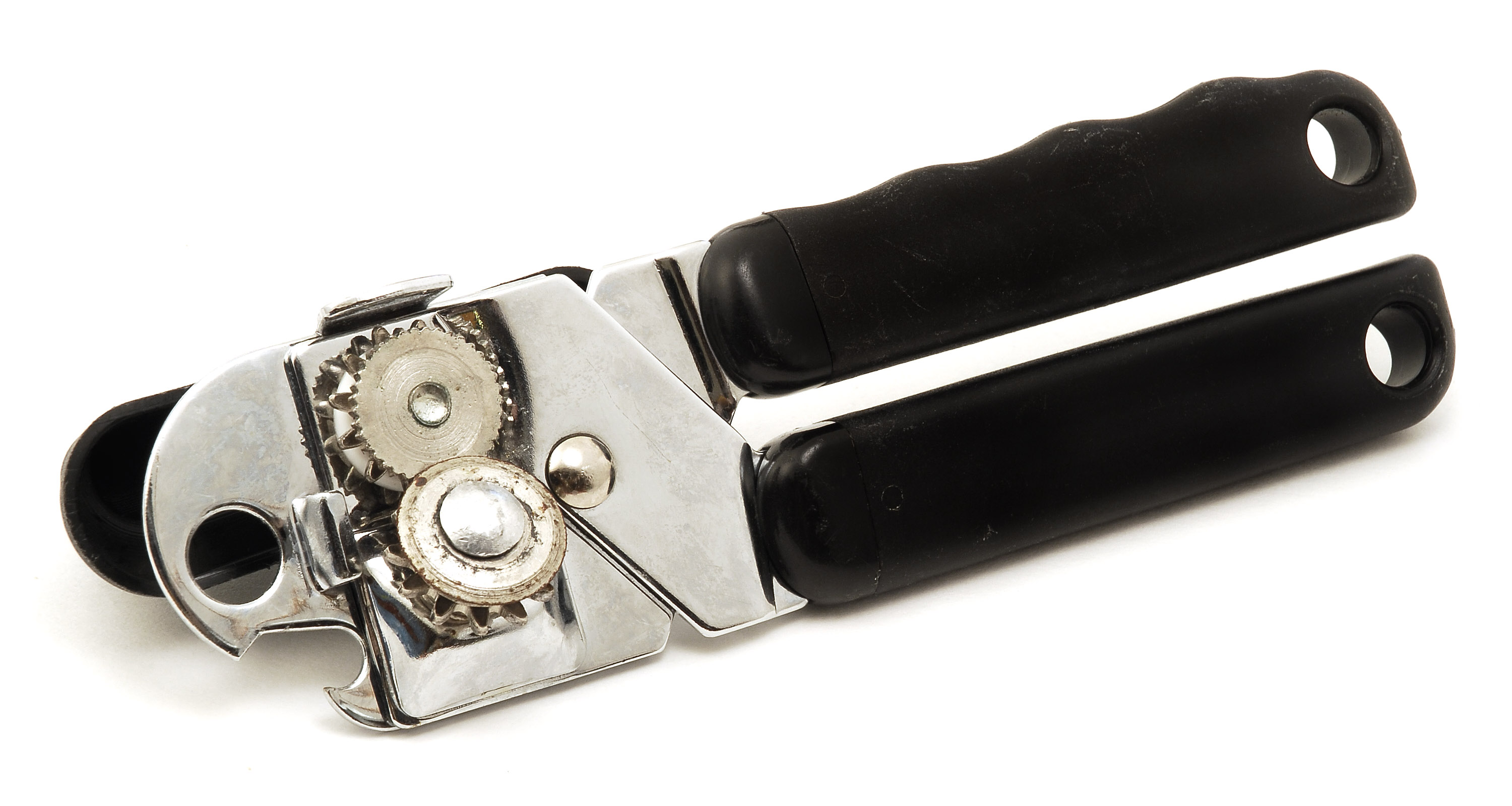
A late-20th-century Bunker style can opener with a rotating cutting wheel and a counter-rotating serrated wheel, for left-handed use

A can opener (North American and Australian English) or tin opener (British English) is a mechanical device used to open metal tin cans. Although preservation of food using tin cans had been practiced since at least 1772 in the Netherlands, the first can openers were not patented until 1855 in England and 1858 in the United States. These early openers were basically variations of a knife, though the 1855 design continues to be produced.

A can opener using the now familiar rotating cutting wheel that runs round the can's rim to cut open the lid was invented in 1870, but the first such design was considered very difficult to operate for the ordinary consumer. A more successful design came out in 1925 when a second, opposing wheel was added, with a serrated surface to grip the rim of the can and keep the lid in contact with the cutting wheel. This easy-to-use design has become one of the most popular can opener models.

Around the time of World War II, several can openers were developed for military use, such as the American P-38 and P-51. These featured a robust and compact design with a pull cutting blade hinged to a corrugated handle with a pivot. Electric can openers were introduced in the late 1950s and met with success. The development of new can opener types continues with a recent redesign of a side-cutting model.

== Invention of cans ==
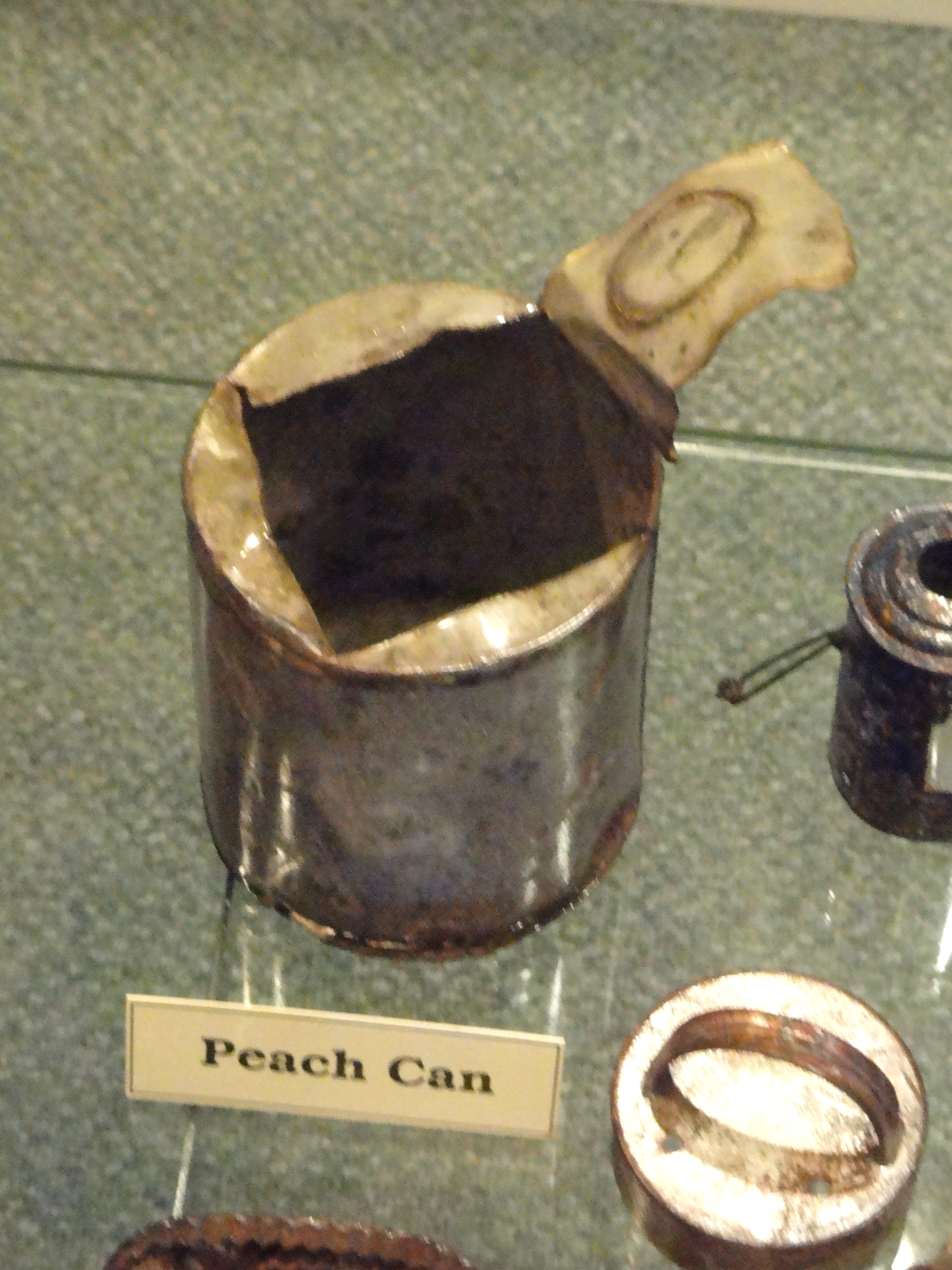
Peach can, September 5, 1856

Food preserved in tin cans was in use by the Dutch Navy from at least 1772. Before 1800, there was already a small industry of canned salmon in the Netherlands. Freshly caught salmon were cleaned, boiled in brine, smoked and placed in tin-plated iron boxes. This canned salmon became known outside the Netherlands, and in 1797 a British company supplied one of their clients with 13 cans of it. Preservation of food in tin cans was patented by Peter Durand in 1810. That patent was acquired in 1812 by Bryan Donkin, who soon set up the world's first canning factory in London in 1813.

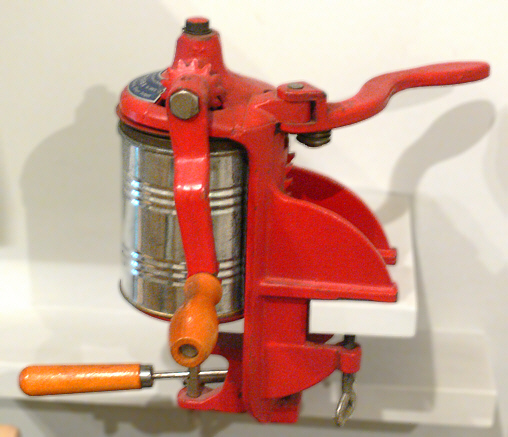
"Simplex" can sealing machine

By 1820, canned food was a generally recognized article in Britain and France, and by 1822 in the United States. The first cans were robust containers, which weighed more than the food they contained and required ingenuity to open, using whatever tools available. The instruction on those cans read "Cut round the top near the outer edge with a chisel and hammer." The gap of decades between the invention of the can and can opener may be attributed to the functionality of existing tools versus the cost and effort of developing a new tool.

== Types ==
=== Twist-key ===
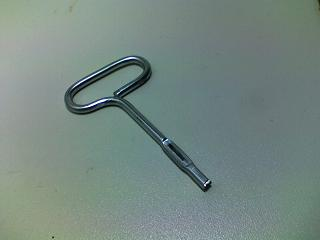
A twist-key can opener

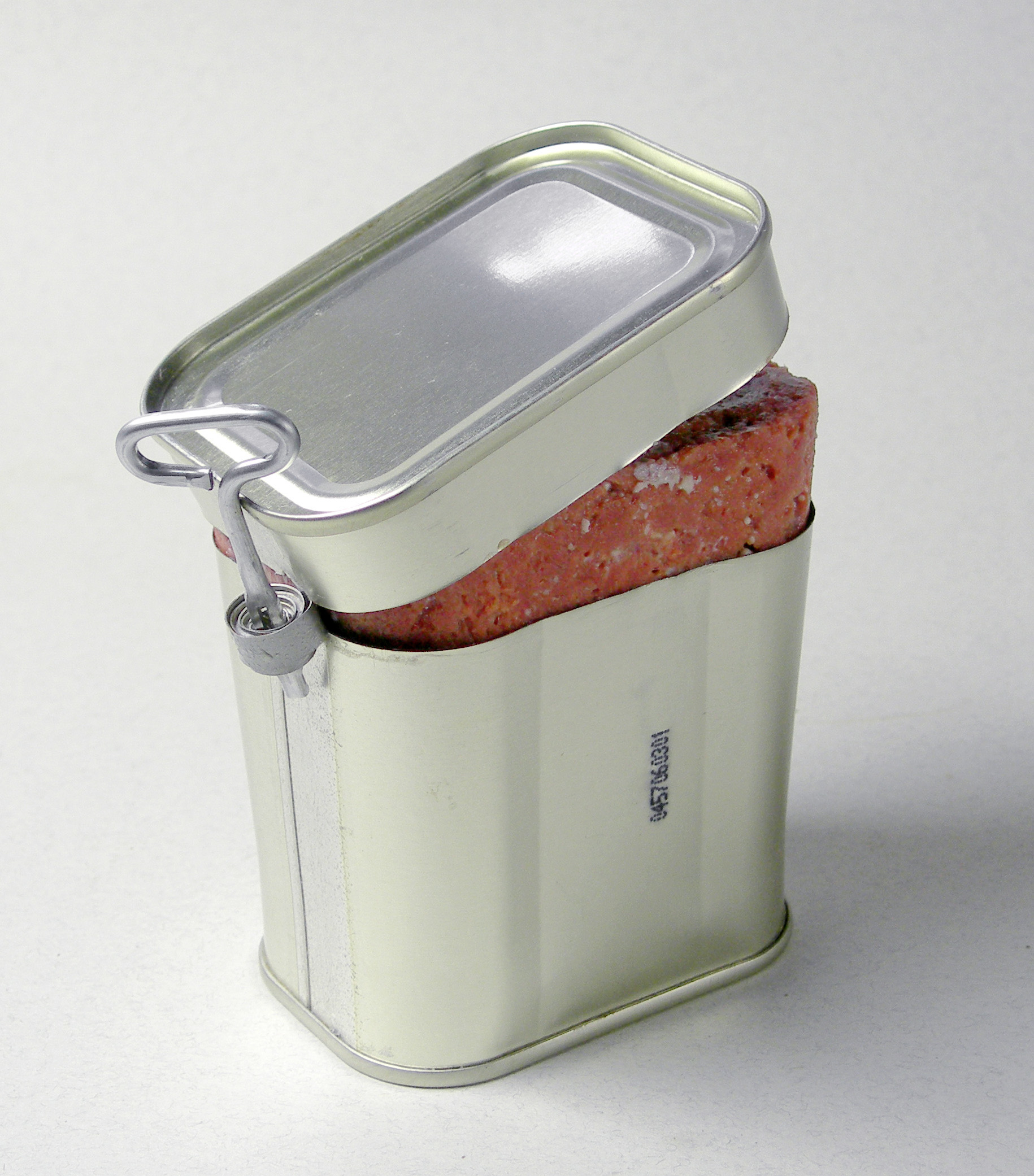
A twist-key can opener in use

During the 1800s, the canning process was mechanized and refined. Can walls became thinner, but there still was no general-purpose can opener.

The twist-key style was patented by J. Osterhoudt in 1866. Each can produced for its use came with a soldered-on twist-key, which snapped off after fatiguing its attachment point by bending back-and-forth. Different food types came in their own style and shape of can, each with a corresponding twist-key. Tinned fish (such as sardines) were sold in flat rectangular cans. A twist-key would be inserted into a fold out tab, then rolled around the top of the can peeling back a pre-scored strip of metal. Coffee, beans, and most other types of meat, were packaged in cylinders, with appropriate sized keys that operated in the same manner.

=== Lever ===
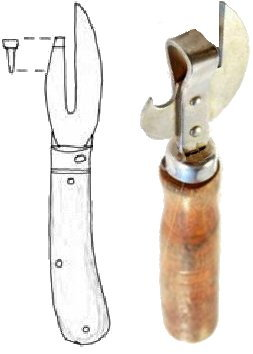
Lever-type can opener design of 1855 by Robert Yeates

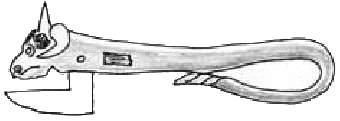
Bull-head push-lever-type can opener of 1865

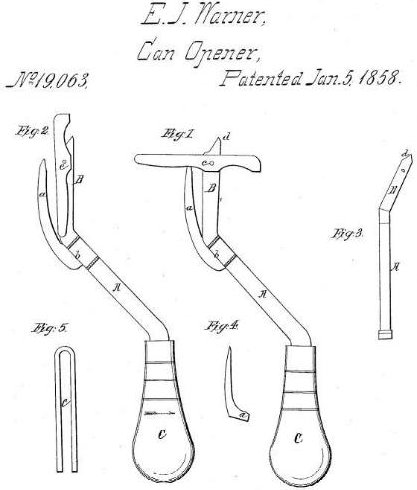
Lever-type can opener design of 1858 by Ezra Warner

General-purpose can openers first appeared in the 1850s and had a primitive claw-shaped or "lever-type" design. In 1855, Robert Yeates, a cutlery and surgical instrument maker of Trafalgar Place West, Hackney Road, Middlesex, UK, devised the first claw-ended can opener with a hand-operated tool that haggled its way around the top of metal cans.

In 1858, another lever-type opener of a more complex shape was patented in the United States by Ezra Warner of Waterbury, Connecticut, US. It consisted of a sharp sickle, which was pushed into the can and sawed around its edge. A guard kept the sickle from penetrating too far into the can. The opener consisted of several parts which could be replaced if worn out, especially the sickle. This opener was adopted by the United States Army during the American Civil War (1861–1865); however, its unprotected knife-like sickle was too dangerous for domestic use. A home-use opener named the "Bull's head opener" was designed in 1865 and was supplied with cans of pickled beef named "Bully beef". The opener was made of cast iron and had a very similar construction to the Yeates opener, but featured a more artistic shape and was the first move towards improving the look of the can opener. The bull-headed design was produced until the 1930s and was also offered with a fish-head shape.

=== Rotating wheel ===
The first known design for a rotating wheel can opener appeared in the April 1853 edition of Scientific American, though it was listed as a more general "Improved Machine For Cutting Tin" designed by H. C. Hart of New York City. The first patent for a rotating wheel design was secured in July 1870 by William Lyman of Meriden, Connecticut, US and produced by the firm Baumgarten in the 1890s. The can was to be pierced in its centre with the sharp metal rod of the opener. Then, the length of the lever had to be adjusted to fit the can size, and the lever fixed with the wingnut. The top of the can was cut by pressing the cutting wheel into the can near the edge and rotating it along the can's rim.

The necessity to pierce the can first was a nuisance, and this can opener design did not survive. In 1920 Edwin Anderson patented a can opener with pivoted handles with which to hold the can in one hand while a key-type handle geared to a cutting wheel is turned with the other cutting the outside of the lip. This was a side can opener, unlike the gramophone-like orientation of most contemporary can openers. It was effectively a hand-held pliers version of the Swanson Can-Opener. In 1925, the Star Can Opener Company of San Francisco, California, US had improved Lyman's design by adding a second, serrated wheel, called a "feed wheel", which allowed a firm grip of the can edge. This addition was so efficient that the design is still in use today.

Whereas all previous openers required using one hand or other means to hold the can, can-holding openers simultaneously grip the can and open it. The first such opener was patented in 1931 by the Bunker Clancey Company of Kansas City, Missouri and was, therefore, called the "Bunker". It featured the now standard pliers-type handles, when squeezed would tightly grip the can rim, while turning the key would rotate the cutting wheel, progressively cutting the lid along the rim. The cutting wheel is coupled to a serrated feed wheel as in the Star design and rotated in the opposite direction by interlocking cogwheels reducing friction. The Bunker company was absorbed by the Rival Manufacturing Company, also of Kansas City, in 1938.

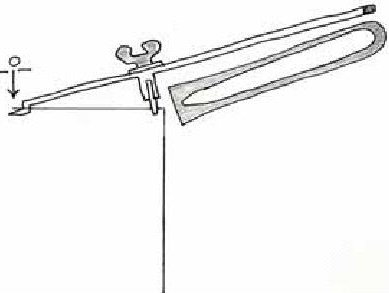
1870 William Lyman can opener

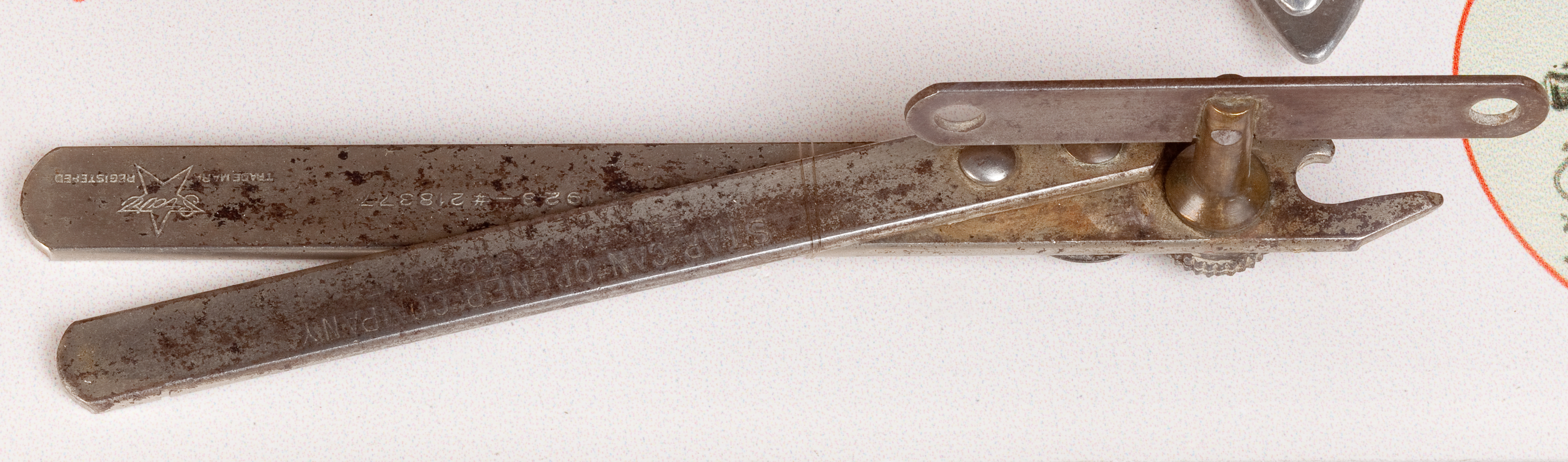
1920 Star Can Opener

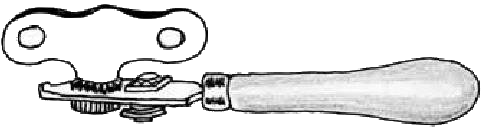
1925 Double-wheel design

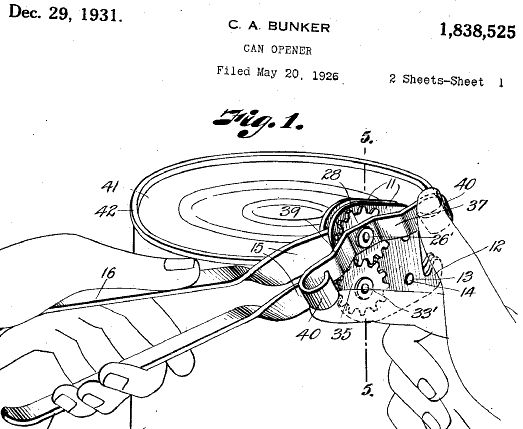
1931 Bunker opener

=== Safety can opener ===
A new style of the can opener emerged in the 1980s. Whereas most other openers remove the lid by cutting down through the lid from the top just inside the rim, removing the top and leaving the rim attached to the can, these use a roller and cutting wheel to cut through the outside seam of the can. The can is left with a relatively safe, non-jagged edge, and the top can be set back on top as a cover, although it does not provide a seal. The feed wheel teeth have a somewhat finer pitch than those of earlier designs and reside at the bottom of a V-shaped groove, which surrounds the rim on three sides at the point of action.

=== Church key ===
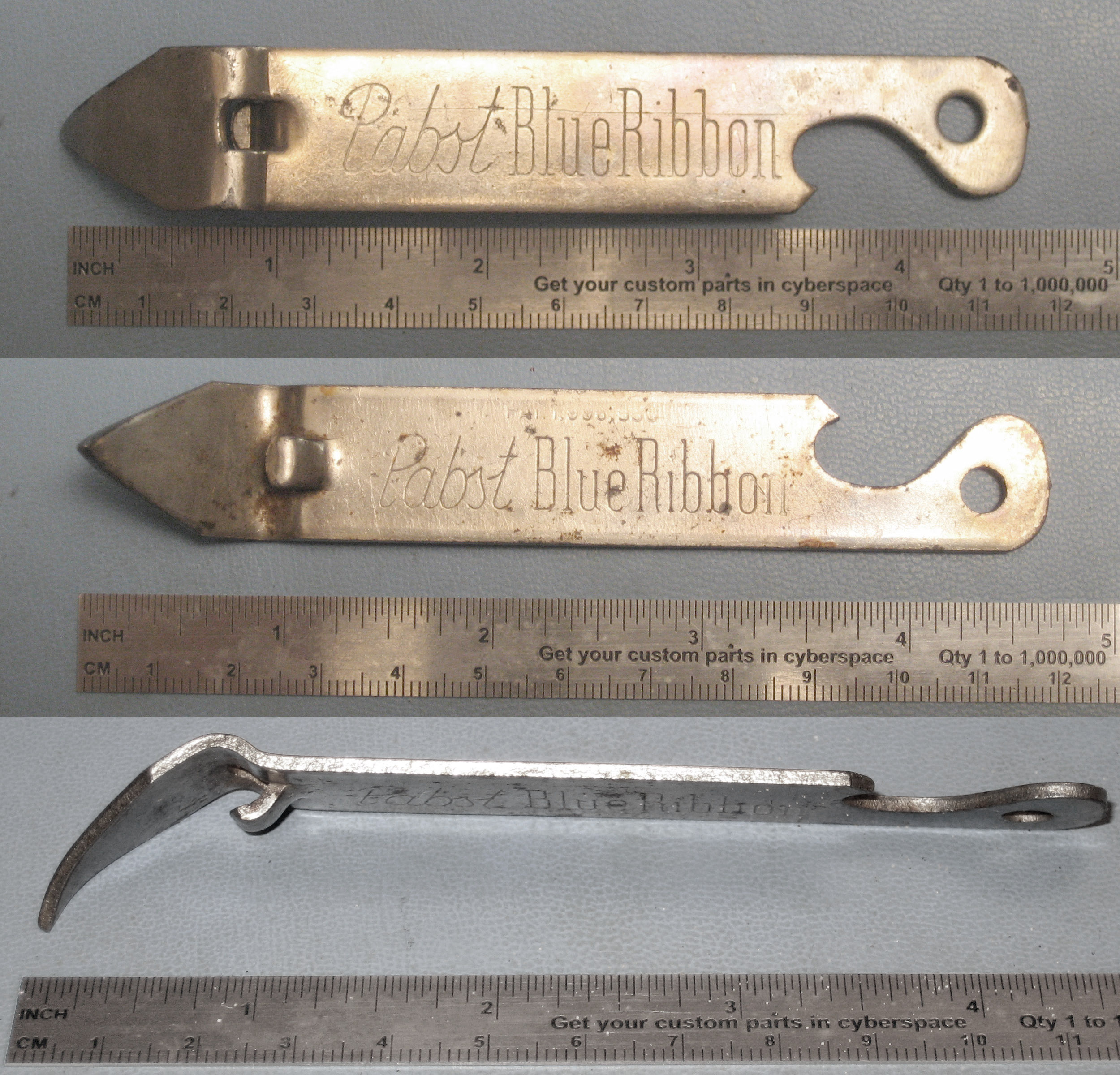
Classic church key, three views. The left end is a can piercer and the right end is a bottle cap lifter.

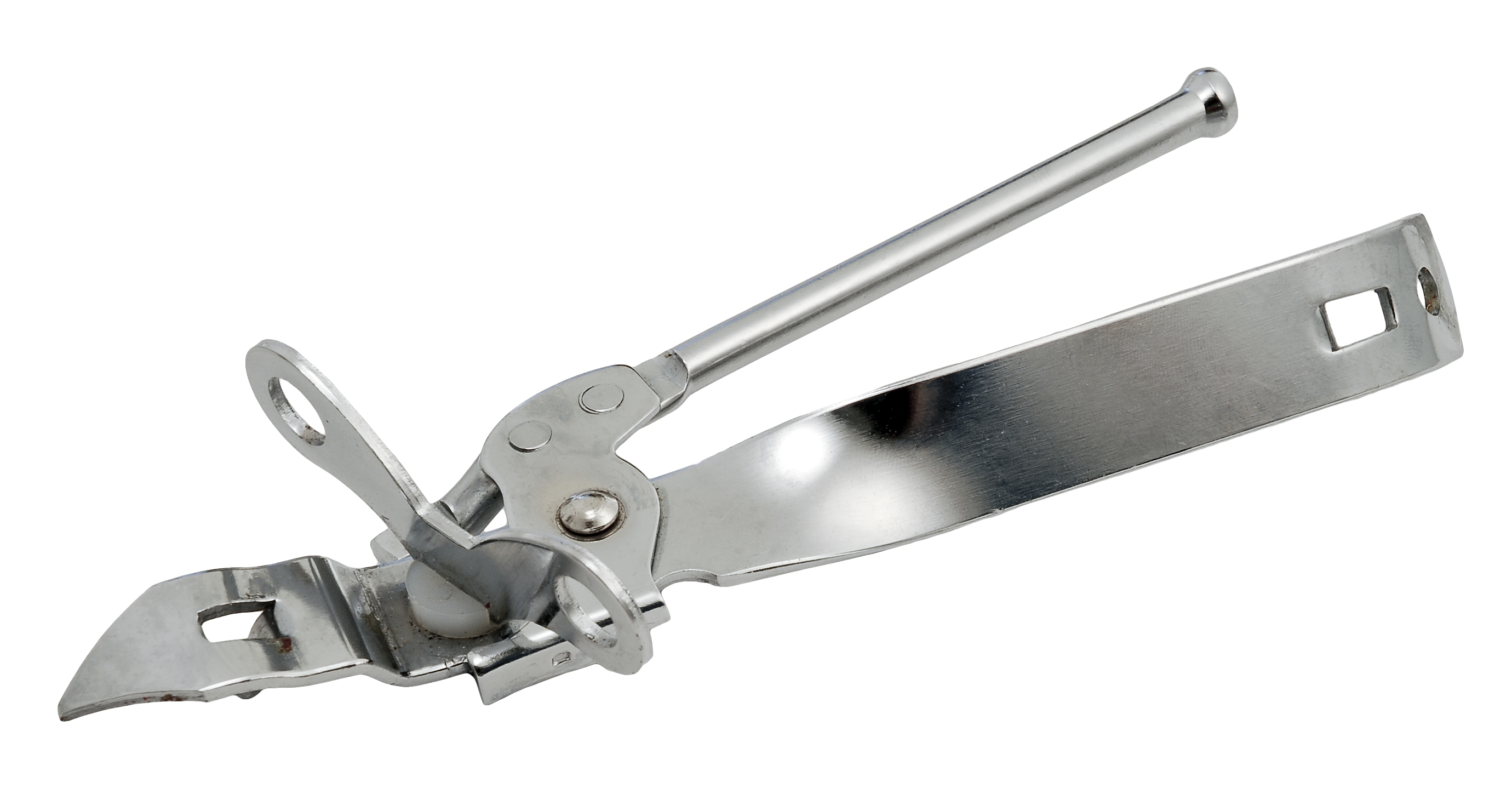
A combination "butterfly" serrated-wheel raking-blade can opener and church key, with can piercer on left and bottle opener on right

The church key opener began as a simple hand-operated device for prying the cap off a glass bottle. Called a "crown cork" or "bottle cap", this kind of closure was invented in 1892. The first church key style opener was patented in Canada in 1900.

In 1935, steel beer cans with flat tops appeared, and a device to pierce the lids was needed. The same opener was used for piercing those cans. Made from a single piece of pressed metal, with a sharp point at one end, it was devised by D. F. Sampson, and licensed by the American Can Company, which depicted operating instructions on the cans. The church key opener is still being produced, sometimes as part of another opener. For example, a "butterfly" opener is often a combination of the church key and a serrated-wheel opener. Beer and soda cans began in the mid-1960s to feature pop-tabs, which eliminated the need to manually pierce the can.

=== Folding ===
The first known folding pocket can opener, advertised as being for explorers, "Explorador español", was designed by D. José Valle Armesto and manufactured in Spain in 1906. It also opened bottle caps and could be used as an emergency screwdriver.

A minimal, simplified folding can opener described as "designed especially for use by campers and Boy Scouts" and suitable for carrying on a key ring was described in Popular Mechanics magazine in April 1924. It is a small flat strip of steel with a hinged sharpened cutting blade that lies flat against the body when not in use. An illustration shows its straightforward and robust design, and how it is used. Various similar folding can openers are described in the P-38 article.

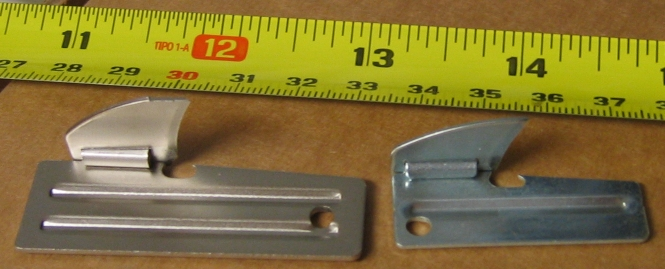
P-51 and P-38 openers

The P-38 can opener, identical to the one described in Popular Mechanics except for having its lanyard hole on the opposite end of its body, was adopted by the United States Armed Forces in 1942 and issued in canned field rations from World War II to the 1980s. It is 1.5 inches (38 mm) long, and consists of a short flat metal handle (that can be used as an emergency screwdriver), with a small, hinged sharp metal cutting tooth that folds out to pierce the can lid. A notch just under the hinge keeps the opener hooked beneath the rim of the can as the device is "walked" around it to cut the lid out. A larger two-inch (51 mm) version, the P-51, provides more leverage, making it somewhat easier to use.

The P-38 and P-51 were cheaper to manufacture and smaller and lighter to carry than any other self-contained can opener, and were often strung on a dog tag chain.

These can openers were discontinued for individual rations by the United States Armed Forces when canned C-rations were replaced by soft-pack MREs in the 1980s.

=== Electric ===
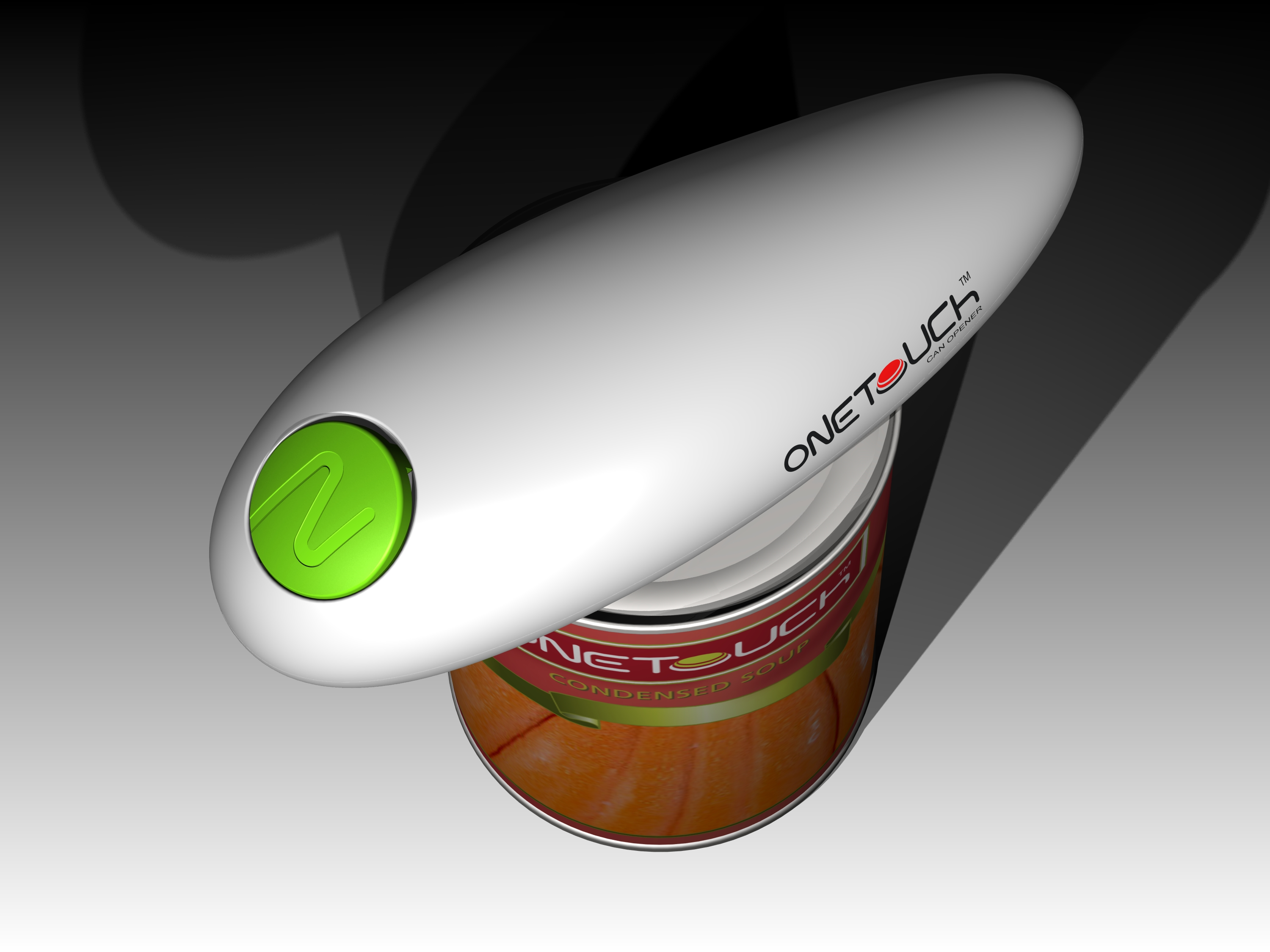
A fully automatic can opener by Mark Sanders

The first electric can opener was modeled after the rotating wheel can opener design and patented in 1931. Advertised as capable of removing lids from more than 20 cans per minute without risk of injury, it nevertheless found little success.

Electric openers were re-introduced in 1956 by two American companies. Klassen Enterprises of Centreville brought out a wall-mounted electric model, but this complex design was unpopular too. The same year, Walter Hess Bodle invented a freestanding device, combining an electric can opener and knife sharpener. He and his family members built their prototype in his garage, with daughter Elizabeth sculpting the body design. It was manufactured under the "Udico" brand of the Union Die Casting Co. in Los Angeles, California, US and was offered in Flamingo Pink, Avocado Green, and Aqua Blue, popular colors of the era. These openers were introduced to the market for Christmas sales and found immediate success.

Like many electronic appliances introduced at the time, electric can openers were promoted as tools to make cooking more convenient.

== See also ==
- Assume a can opener
