= Ezra Warner (inventor) =

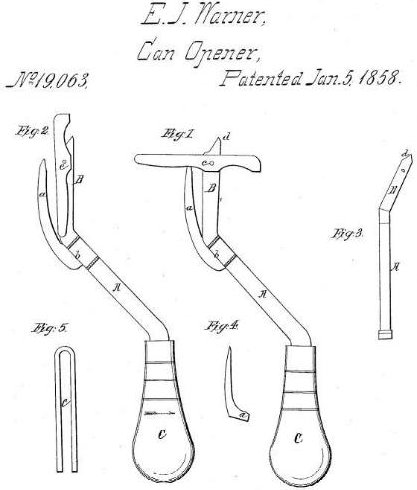
A drawing from the can opener patent No 19063 by Warner

Ezra J. Warner of Waterbury, Connecticut was an American inventor, who patented his design of a can opener in 1858. A crudely shaped bayonet and sickle combo, his design was widely accepted by the U.S. military during the period of the American Civil War.

Can openers were needed because early cans were robust containers, which weighed more than food and required ingenuity to open, using whatever tools available. The instruction on those cans read "Cut round the top near the outer edge with a chisel and hammer." The bayonet part of Ezra Warner's can opener was pressed into the can, and a metal guard kept it from penetrating too far into the can. The other part was the sickle, which was forced into the can and sawed around the edge. However, Warner’s can opener was not a tool for domestic use, because it could be dangerous. Grocers opened the cans before they left the store. The first widespread domestic can opener was patented by William Lyman.
