= Can Manufacturers Institute =

American trade association

The Can Manufacturers Institute (CMI) is a trade association of manufacturers and suppliers of metal cans in the United States.

The CMI was chartered in 1938. At that time, it represented 39 companies including can manufacturers and other businesses which supplied goods and services to the can industry. Members include manufacturers of steel and aluminum cans, aluminum suppliers, steel suppliers, and producers of inks, sealants, and coatings used in making cans. The association estimates that its members are collectively responsible for more than 81 percent of U.S. can production. Member companies operate plants in 33 states, Puerto Rico, and American Samoa, and they have 22,000 employees.

The institute is headquartered in Washington, DC. Between 1998 and 2009, the institute's annual expenditures on federal government lobbying ranged from $20,000 (in 1999 and 2009) to $200,000 (in 2003, 2004, and 2005).
