= Albion metal =

Lead-and-tin foil

Albion metal is a form of metal foil produced by rolling tin onto a lead base, or sandwiching lead between two sheets of tin.

An alternative method of production was to cast tin onto an ingot of recently-cast, congealing, lead.

Albion metal is used for decorative rather than load-bearing purposes, such as coffin adornments, toys, and costume jewellery, and for protecting foodstuffs and drinking water from contact with lead.

It was introduced and patented in 1804, by Thomas Dobbs, an inventor from Kings Norton who was also a comic actor at the Theatre Royal in Birmingham, England.

The patent was the subject of a legal dispute in 1857, when a failed attempt was made to use it to invalidate another later patent.
