= William Lyman (inventor) =

American inventor (1821–1891)

William Worcester Lyman
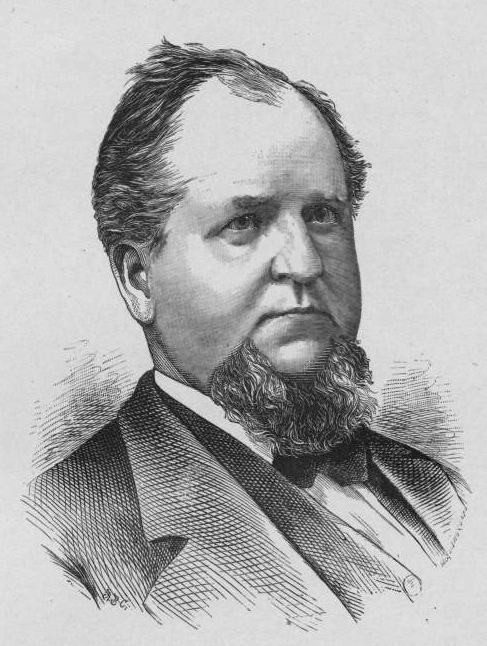
- Born: March 29, 1821; Middlefield, Connecticut
- Died: November 15, 1891 (aged 70)
- Known for: The first rotary can opener
- Scientific career
- Fields: Inventor

William Worcester Lyman (March 29, 1821 – November 15, 1891) was an American inventor from Meriden, Connecticut. He is credited with inventing the first rotating wheel can opener.

William Lyman was born in 1821 in Middlefield, Connecticut. At the age of 15 he was apprenticed to the local company Griswold & Couch, located in Meriden, Connecticut, to learn pewtersmithery, and worked there until 1844. After that, he continued working as a pewtersmith with various local companies until 1880. In 1849, he was appointed as State Representative in Meriden. On September 5, 1841 William married Roxanne Griswold Frary, a local woman one year older than he was. He died in Meriden in 1891 at the age of 70.

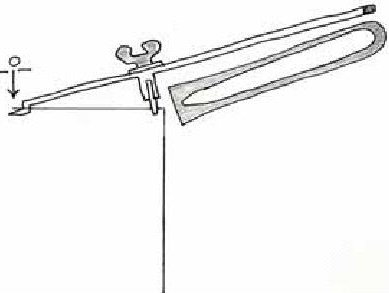
Rotary can opener of 1870 by William Lyman. A side view is added below the handle

Lyman was a dedicated inventor, and was awarded several US patents. The most famous is his rotating wheel can opener, invented in 1870. Whereas previous can openers were basically variations of a knife, Lyman's design was the first attempt to facilitate the procedure (see picture). The can was to be pierced in its center with the sharp metal rod of the opener. Then the length of the lever had to be adjusted to fit the can size, and the lever fixed with the wingnut. The top of the can was cut by pressing the cutting wheel into the can near the edge and rotating it along the can's rim. The need to pierce the can first was a nuisance, and this can opener design has not survived. In 1925, a modern-style opener, equipped with an additional serrated wheel, was invented to improve Lyman's design.

His other patents were dedicated to improvements to various household food utensils such as a refrigerating pitcher (1858), fruit can lids (1862), tea and coffee pots, and a butter-dish. As an example illustrating the nature of those improvements, Lyman's fruit can lid relied on the physical principle that hot food placed in a jar and then allowed to cool would suck down the lid, provided with an elastic rim inside, thereby sealing the can.

Drawings from some patents of William W Lyman
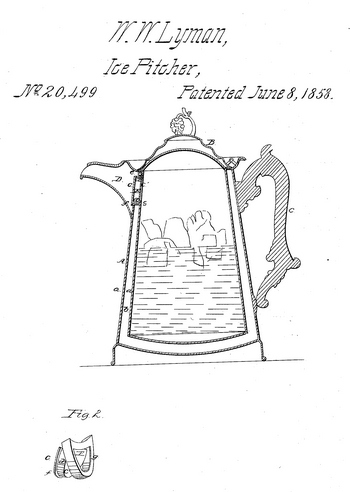
Ice pitcher

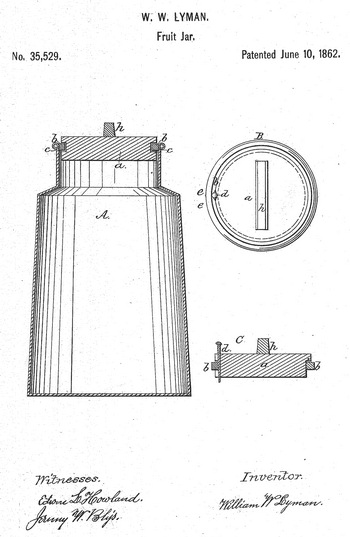
Fruit jar

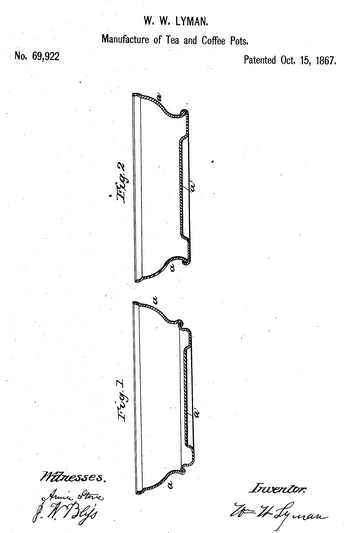
Manufacture of tea and coffee pots

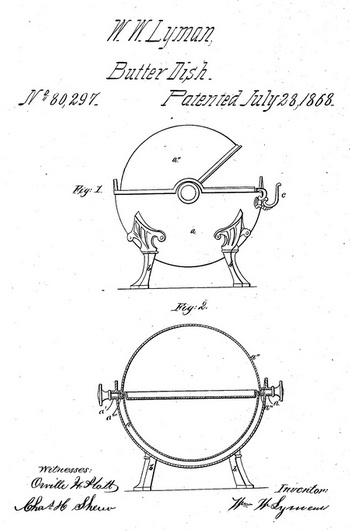
Butter dish
