= J & E Hall =

Founders and manufacturers of heavy machinery

J & E Hall is an English manufacturer of refrigeration equipment (today part of the Daikin group). It was originally established as an iron works in Dartford, Kent in 1785, with products including papermaking machines, steam engines and gun carriages, before it started producing refrigeration machinery in the 1880s. During the early 20th century, the company diversified to produce commercial vehicles (branded as Hallford, 1906–1926), lifts and escalators, before refocusing on its core refrigeration and air conditioning products in the late 1960s. The company retains a head office and some R&D facilities in Dartford.

== History ==
The company was originally established in 1785 in Lowfield Street, Dartford by smith and millwright John Hall (1764–1836). Originally from Alton, Hampshire, the second son of a millwright who had previously worked in Dartford, Hall moved to Dartford in 1784, and was employed to repair a mill on the River Darent in Hawley, after which he set up his own business, repairing and maintaining machinery used in corn, paper, oil and powder mills in and around Dartford.

Bryan Donkin was one of the firm's earliest apprentices. Around 1800, the firm moved to larger premises in Waterside (now Hythe Street) on land which had once formed part of Dartford Priory, where its association with Donkin, now involved in the area's papermaking industry, helped it expand in partnership with the Fourdrinier brothers and John Gamble, to make paper machines. Donkin, Hall and Gamble also collaborated on canning food in metal containers. Hall acquired Peter Durand's patent in 1812 and after various experiments, Donkin, Hall and Gamble set up a canning factory in Blue Anchor Lane in Bermondsey, the first cannery to use tinned iron containers. By late spring 1813 they were appointing agents on the south coast to sell the preserved food to outbound ships, and the British Admiralty placed large orders with the firm of Donkin, Hall and Gamble for tinned meat. The firm later merged into Crosse & Blackwells.

As an iron foundry business, Hall's company subsequently built steam engines and gun carriages, and in 1881 developed horizontal dry air refrigeration machinery suitable for use on ships. Refrigeration ultimately became the company's core business.

=== Commercial vehicles, lifts and escalators ===
However, it also produced, from 1906 until 1926, parts for and then complete petrol-driven commercial vehicles. Initially, it manufactured chassis for heavy motor vehicles, including London buses, later also producing engines, with the vehicles branded as Hallfords (after its telegraphic address, a conflation of 'Hall' and 'Dartford'). Brewers and haulage contractors equipped their fleets with Hallfords, and the British Army deployed Hallford lorries during World War I. They continued to be sold until 1926.

In the 1920s Halls started to manufacture passenger and goods lifts, taking over the Medway Safety Lift Company, and during World War II installing lifts in Royal Navy ships. Halls' lifts were also installed in buildings. During the 1930s Halls started to produce escalators under licence from a German company, with its products installed in Harrods and Selfridges, among other locations. In 1951, Halls were responsible for the modernisation of the Babbacombe Cliff Lift. They continued to make lifts and escalators until 1968 when that part of the business was sold to Otis.

=== Refrigeration ===
In 1886, J & E Hall's first cold air machines were used to freeze 30,000 mutton carcasses being shipped from the Falkland Islands to the UK. Three years later, installed a two-stage carbon dioxide compressor for a frozen meat store at London's Smithfield Market. In 1910, it supplied refrigeration equipment to the National Skating Palace. Its machinery was used extensively on land: in London hospitals and hotels, by brewers, and in shops. In 1910, ammonia refrigeration was added to the Hall company refrigeration range. By the early 1920s J & E Hall had installed more than half of the world's marine cargo refrigeration, while on land it was regarded as a world leader, expanding into CO_{2}, methyl chloride and the use of fluorocarbons. In 1931 it provided compressors for the Grimsby Ice Factory, once the largest factory of its kind, supplying ice to fishing fleets in the world's largest fishing port.

=== Merger and acquisition ===
A June 1959 merger of Hall with Thermotank and Vent-Axia to form Hall-Thermotank proved a disaster. Profits fell, subsidiaries were sold, and the foundry closed. In 1968 the company decided to focus on the production of concentrate refrigeration units and air conditioners, producing small automatic compressors using methyl chloride as the refrigerant. The company's financial situation began to improve after a major reorganization in the 1970s.

In 1976 Hall-Thermotank was acquired by the APV group and renamed APV Hall. In 1984 it was awarded a Queen's Award for Industry for the development of the Hallscrew single refrigeration compressor. In 1992 Vent-Axia, excepting its industrial division at Milton Keynes, was sold by APV to Smiths Industries. In 1994 APV Hall was acquired by McQuay International, then part of the Malaysian OYL group, and the J & E Hall name was reinstated. OYL became part of Japanese Daikin Industries Ltd in 2006.

J & E Hall no longer has a factory in Dartford (the Hythe Street site is now a retail park), but retains a head office (in Hawley Road) and some R&D facilities in the town.

== Association with Richard Trevithick ==
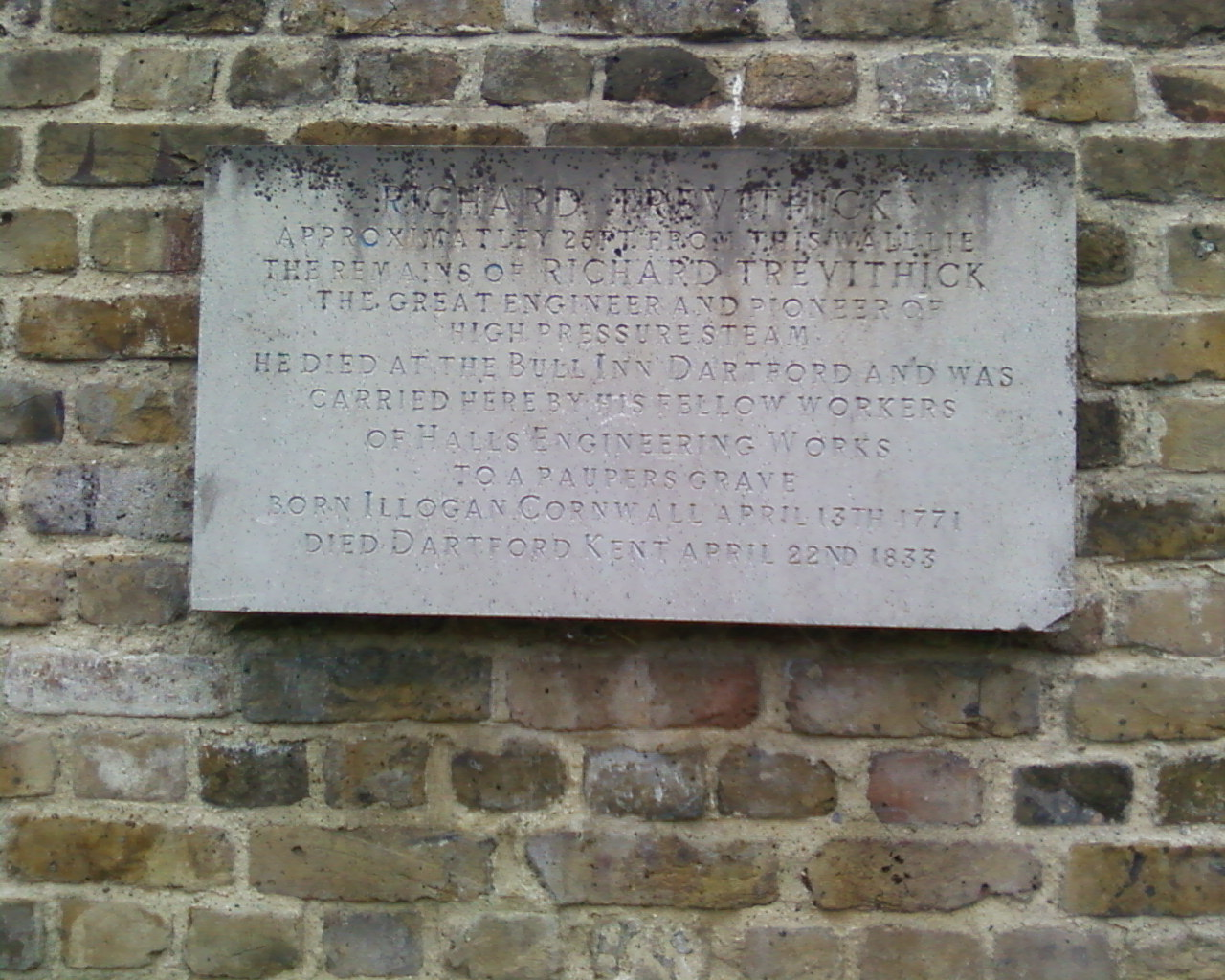
Plaque at St Edmund's Burial Ground, East Hill, Dartford. It reads: "Richard Trevithick. Approximately 25ft from this wall lie the remains of Richard Trevithick. The great engineer and pioneer of high-pressure steam. He died at the Bull Inn, Dartford and was carried here by fellow workers of Halls Engineering Works. To a paupers grave. Born Illogan, Cornwall April 13th 1771. Died Dartford, Kent April 22nd 1833"

J & E Hall is strongly associated with the late career of steam engine pioneer Richard Trevithick. In 1832, he was invited by John Hall to work on a steam engine at the Dartford works, and lodged nearby at The Bull (today The Royal Victoria and Bull Hotel) in High Street. In early 1833, Trevithick was taken ill with pneumonia and died at the Bull on the morning of 22 April 1833. Colleagues at Hall's works made a collection for his funeral expenses, acted as bearers, and paid a night watchman to guard his grave at night to deter grave robbers.

Trevithick was buried in an unmarked grave in St Edmund's Burial Ground, East Hill, Dartford. The burial ground closed in 1857, with the gravestones being removed in the 1960s. A plaque marks the approximate spot believed to be the site of the grave. The plaque lies on the side of the park, near the East Hill gate, and an unlinked path.

== Other notable engineers connected with J & E Hall ==
- Bryan Donkin
- Thomas Pullinger
- Walter Gordon Wilson
