= John Hall (engineer) =

English millwright and engineer (1765–1836)

John Hall (5 September 1765 – 7 January 1836) was an English millwright and mechanical engineer, who, in 1785, founded the Dartford-based engineering company which became J & E Hall, today a prominent supplier of refrigeration machinery, and part of the Daikin group. During Hall's lifetime, he helped mechanise the papermaking industry, co-founded the first UK canning firm, and developed steam engines for land and marine use.

== Early career ==
Born in Whitchurch, Hampshire, John was the second son of a millwright, William Hall (1710–1794), who had previously worked in Dartford, but was employed at the Portal family's paper mill in Laverstoke, Hampshire. John Hall moved to Dartford in April 1784, and was employed by a Mr T H Saunders to repair a mill on the River Darent in Hawley. Saunders urged Hall to set up his own business, repairing and maintaining machinery used in corn, paper, oil and powder mills in and around Dartford, and in 1785 Hall opened a workshop in Lowfield Street in Dartford. Bryan Donkin was an early apprentice, in 1792.

== Ventures with Donkin ==
Around 1800, the firm moved to larger premises in Waterside (now Hythe Street) on land which had once formed part of Dartford Priory. Through his association with Donkin, now involved in the area's papermaking industry, Hall helped a partnership with the Fourdrinier brothers (Henry and Sealy) and John Gamble, to make paper machines, installed in Frogmore Paper Mill in Apsley, Hertfordshire.

Donkin, Hall and Gamble also collaborated on canning food in metal containers. Hall acquired Peter Durand's patent in 1812 and after various experiments, Donkin, Hall and Gamble set up a canning factory in Blue Anchor Lane in Bermondsey, the first cannery to use tinned iron containers. By late spring 1813 they were appointing agents on the south coast to sell the preserved food to outbound ships, and the British Admiralty placed large orders with the firm of Donkin, Hall and Gamble for tinned meat. Hall left the canning firm partnership in 1819, and the firm later merged into Crosse & Blackwell.

== Iron works ==
As an iron foundry business, Hall's company subsequently built steam engines and gun carriages. In the early days of marine engineering, Hall designed and made the engines for S.S. Batavia (for the Steam Navigation Company), and, in 1836, the S.S. Wilberforce (built by Curling & Young at Blackwall for the Humber Union S.S. Company of Hull). The company also designed and patented (1835), the first trunk engine, fitted on board the paddle steamer "Dartford," built at Gravesend. Letterhead dating from the time of John Hall & Sons listed some of the company's products:

"'steam-engines on Woolff [sic] and Boulton & Watts principle; engines for steam vessels on improved principles; rolling mills for iron, copper, lead and zinc; patent steam presses for oil mills; roll bars and plates for paper engines; machinery for plate-glass works; oil, gunpowder, bark, corn, sugar and saw mills, hydraulic and screw presses, diving bells, pumps, cranes, etc.etc. 'fitted up in the best manner'."

=== Association with Richard Trevithick ===
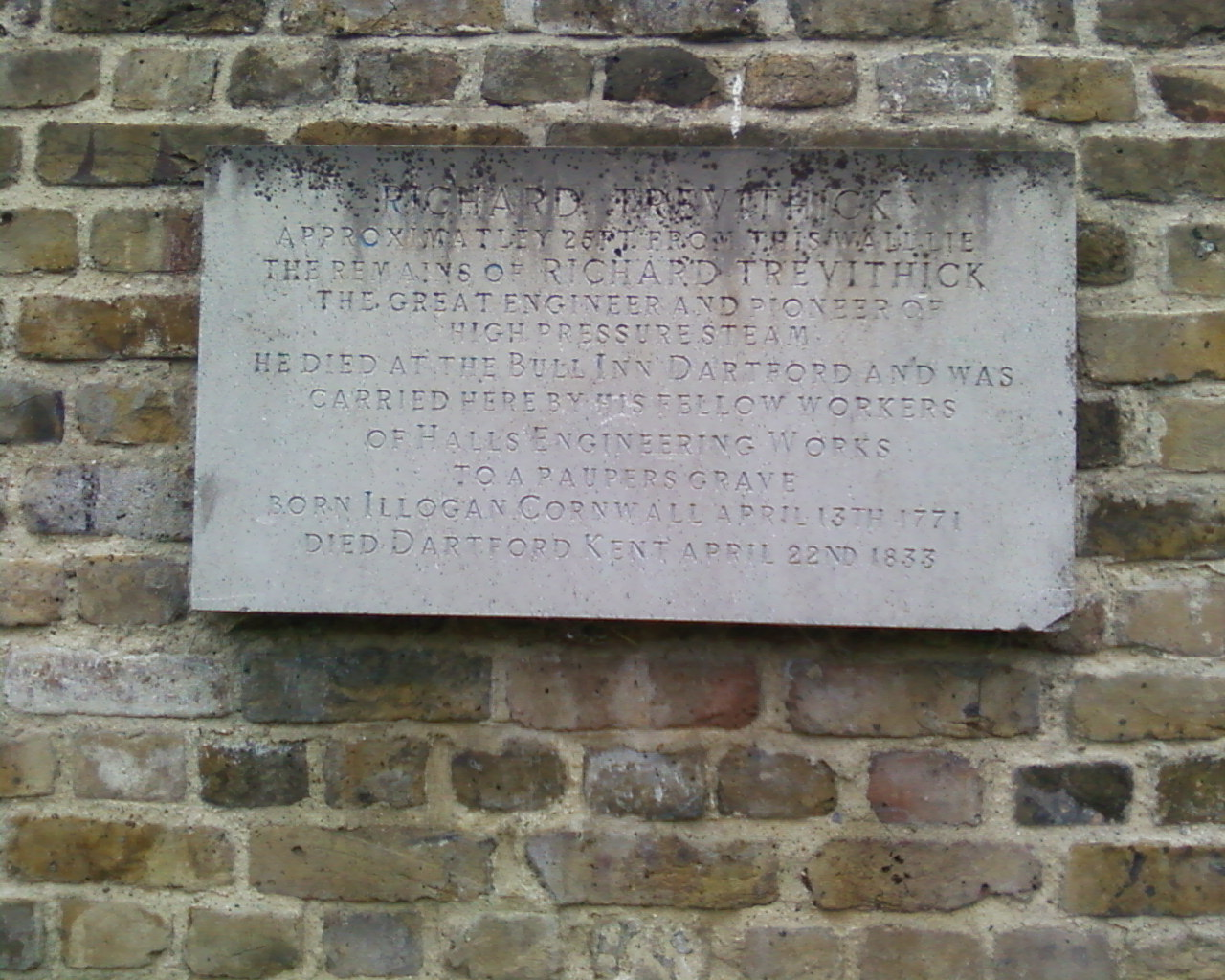
The plaque at St Edmund's Burial Ground, East Hill, Dartford. With the words "Richard Trevithick. Approximately 25ft from this wall lie the remains of Richard Trevithick. The great engineer and pioneer of high-pressure steam. He died at the Bull Inn, Dartford and was carried here by fellow workers of Halls Engineering Works. To a paupers grave. Born Illogan, Cornwall April 13th 1771. Died Dartford, Kent April 22nd 1833".

J & E Hall is strongly associated with the late career (and death) of steam engine pioneer Richard Trevithick. In 1832, he was invited by John Hall to work on a steam engine at Dartford, and lodged at The Bull (today The Royal Victoria and Bull Hotel) in Dartford. In early 1833, Trevithick was taken ill with pneumonia and died at the Bull on the morning of 22 April 1833. Colleagues at Hall's works made a collection for his funeral expenses, acted as bearers, and paid a night watchman to guard his grave at night to deter grave robbers.

== Family life and church ==
On 17 December 1791, John Hall married Sarah Stainton, a daughter of local Dartford landowner Peter Brames. He had two sons John and Edward, the latter of which would head the business subsequently known as J & E Hall.

John Hall (senior) was the principal founder of the first Wesleyan church in Dartford, converting two cottages at the corner of Priory Lane, Waterside, into a church, which opened on New Year's Day, 1794. This building soon became too small and a new building on the east side of Waterside was erected in 1798, at the cost of £700, and then further enlarged in 1819. Hall and his family also proved educational opportunities, with a Methodist Sunday School opened in a cottage which formed part of the ironworks. When he died, the paperworks at Horton Kirby were taken over by his son Henry.
