= Canning =

Method of preserving food

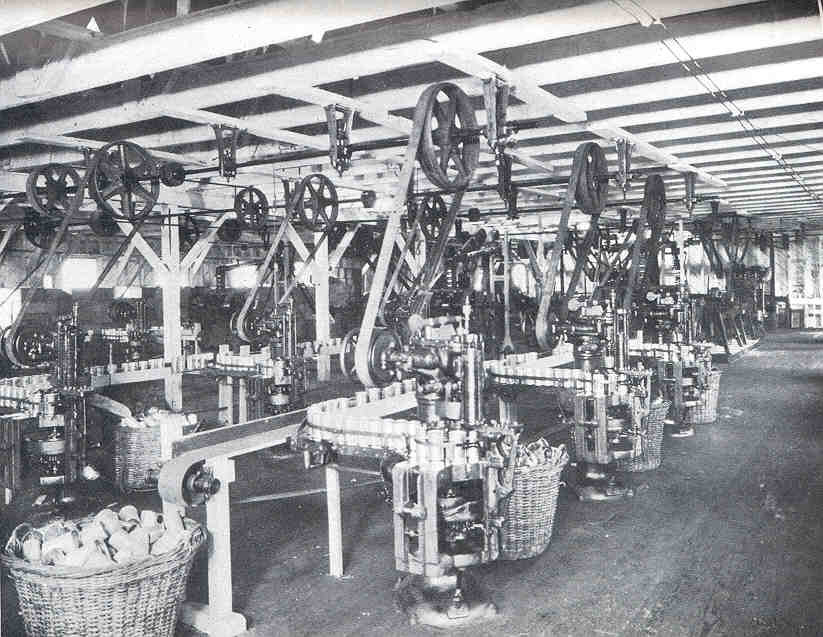
Industrial canning machines used for mass-producing canned salmon in 1917

Canning is a method of food preservation in which food is processed and sealed in an airtight container (jars like Mason jars, and steel and tin cans). Canning provides a shelf life that typically ranges from one to five years, (Note: According to the United States Department of Agriculture (USDA), "canned foods are safe indefinitely as long as they are not exposed to freezing temperatures, or temperatures above 90 °F (32.2 °C)". If the cans look okay, they are safe to use. Discard cans that are dented, rusted, or swollen. High-acid canned foods (tomatoes, fruits) will keep their best quality for 12 to 18 months; low-acid canned foods (meats, vegetables) for 2 to 5 years.) although under specific circumstances, it can be much longer. A freeze-dried canned product, such as canned dried lentils, could last as long as 30 years in an edible state.

In 1974, samples of canned food from the wreck of the Bertrand, a steamboat that sank in the Missouri River in 1865, were tested by the National Food Processors Association. Although appearance, smell, and vitamin content had deteriorated, there was no trace of microbial growth and the 109-year-old food was determined to be still safe to eat.

== History and development ==
=== Dutch Origins ===
The Dutch are noted as the first to tin food, their Navy being reported as carrying cleaned and brine-cooked salmon, in tin-plated iron boxes, as early as 1772.

=== French experiments ===
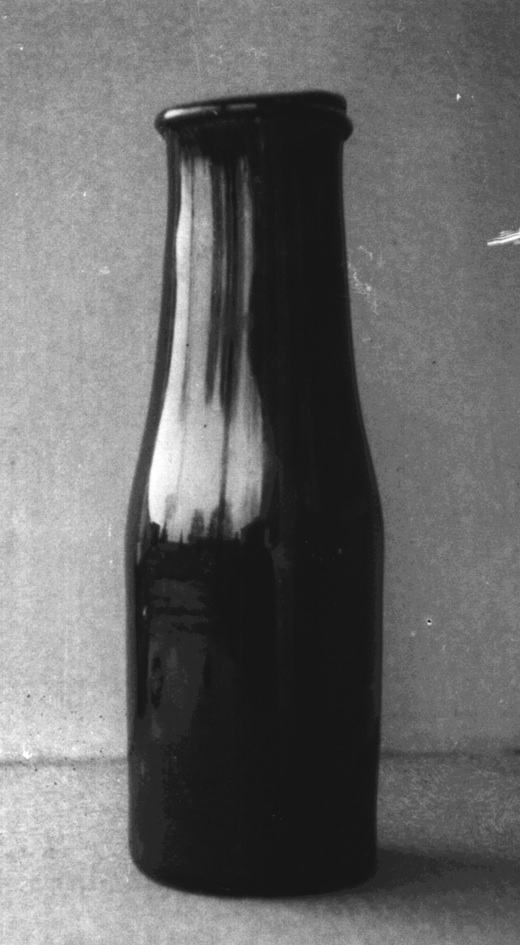
A canning jar used by Nicolas Appert's canning factory

Shortly before the Napoleonic Wars, the French government offered a hefty cash award of 12,000 francs to any inventor who could devise a cheap and effective method of preserving large amounts of food to create well-preserved military rations for the Grande Armée. The larger armies of the period required increased and regular supplies of quality food. Limited food availability was among the factors limiting military campaigns to the summer and autumn months. In 1809, Nicolas Appert, a French confectioner and brewer, observed that food cooked inside a jar did not spoil unless the seals leaked, and developed a method of sealing food in glass jars. Appert was awarded the prize in 1810 by Count Montelivert, a French minister of the interior. The reason for lack of spoilage was unknown at the time, since it would be another 50 years before Louis Pasteur demonstrated the role of microbes in food spoilage and developed pasteurization.

The Grande Armée began experimenting with issuing canned foods to its soldiers, but the slow process of canning and the even slower development and transport stages prevented the army from shipping large amounts across the French Empire, and the wars ended before the process was perfected.

Following the end of the Napoleonic Wars, the canning process was gradually employed in other European countries and the United States.

=== In the United Kingdom ===
Based on Appert's methods of food preservation, the tin can process was allegedly developed by Frenchman Philippe de Girard, who came to London and used British merchant Peter Durand as an agent to patent his own idea in 1810. Durand did not pursue food canning himself, selling his patent in 1811 to Bryan Donkin and John Hall, who were in business as Donkin Hall and Gamble, of Bermondsey. Bryan Donkin developed the process of packaging food in sealed airtight cans, made of tinned wrought iron. Initially, the canning process was slow and labour-intensive, as each large can had to be hand-made, and took up to six hours to cook, making canned food too expensive for ordinary people.

The main market for the food at this stage was the British Army and Royal Navy. By 1817, Donkin recorded that he had sold £3000 (equal to £222,201 today) worth of canned meat in six months. In 1824, Sir William Edward Parry took canned beef and pea soup with him on his voyage to the Arctic in HMS Fury, during his search for a northwestern passage to India. In 1829, Admiral Sir James Ross also took canned food to the Arctic, as did Sir John Franklin in 1845. Some of his stores were found by the search expedition led by Captain (later Admiral Sir) Leopold McClintock in 1857.

=== In Europe ===
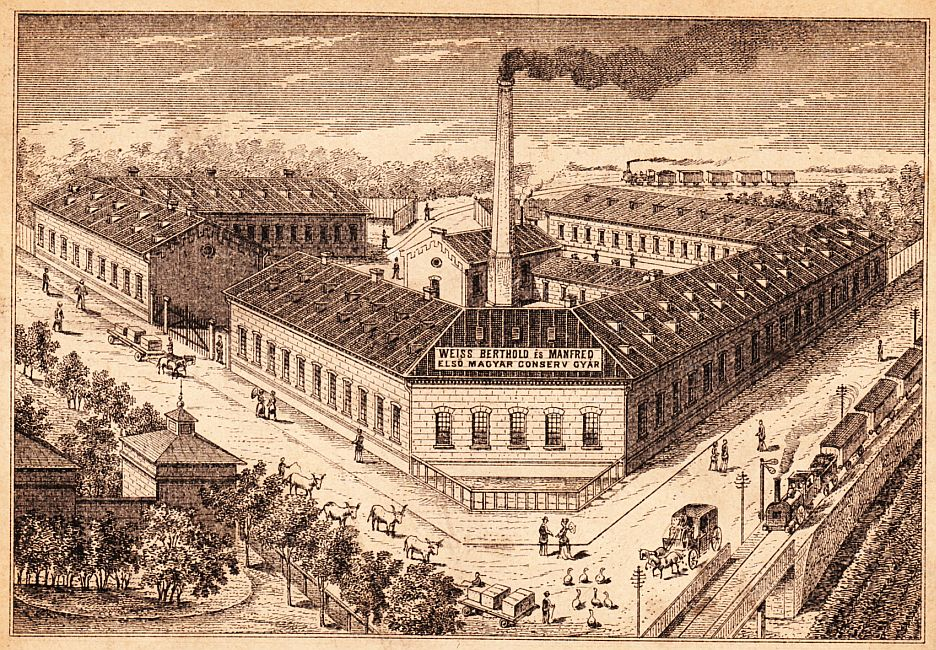
The Berthold-Weiss Factory, one of the first large canned food factories in Csepel, Budapest (1885)

During the mid-19th century, canned food became a status symbol among middle-class households in Europe, being something of a frivolous novelty. Early methods of manufacture employed poisonous lead solder for sealing the cans. Studies in the 1980s attributed the lead from the cans as a factor in the disastrous outcome of the 1845 Franklin expedition to chart and navigate the Northwest Passage. However, studies in 2013 and 2016 suggested that lead poisoning was likely not a factor, and that the crew's ill health may, in fact, have been due to malnutrition—specifically zinc deficiency—possibly due to a lack of meat in their diet.

Increasing mechanization of the canning process, coupled with a huge increase in urban populations across Europe, resulted in a rising demand for canned food. A number of inventions and improvements followed, and by the 1860s smaller machine-made steel cans were possible, and the time to cook food in sealed cans had been reduced from around six hours to thirty minutes.

=== In the United States ===
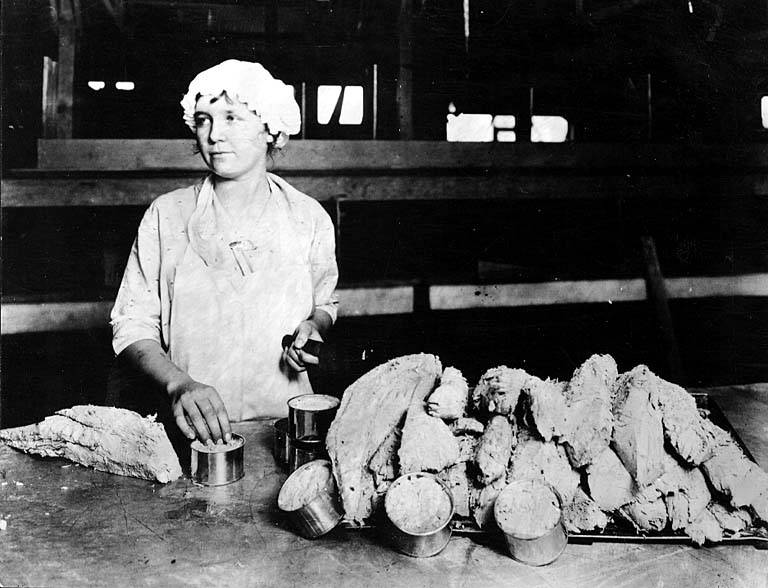
A cannery worker filling cans of cooked tuna in Long Beach, California, United States, c. 1930

Canned food also began to spread beyond Europe. Robert Ayars established the first American canning factory in New York City in 1812, food preserved in jars, later it would begin using improved tin-plated wrought-iron cans for preserving oysters, meats, fruits, and vegetables. Demand for canned food greatly increased during wars. Large-scale wars in the nineteenth century, such as the Crimean War, American Civil War, and Franco-Prussian War, introduced increasing numbers of working-class men to canned food, and allowed canning companies to expand their businesses to meet military demands for non-perishable food, enabling companies to manufacture in bulk and sell to wider civilian markets after wars ended. Urban populations in Victorian Britain demanded ever-increasing quantities of cheap, varied, quality food that they could keep at home without having to go shopping daily. In response, companies such as Underwood, Nestlé, Heinz, and others provided quality canned food for sale to working class city-dwellers. The late 19th century saw the range of canned food available to urban populations greatly increase, as canners competed with each other using novel foodstuffs, highly decorated printed labels, and lower prices.

=== World War I ===
During World War I, Military commanders required vast quantities of cheap, high-calorie food to feed their millions of soldiers. As a result, demand for canned food skyrocketed; canned food would not spoil during long transport and could endure harsh conditions in the trenches. Throughout the war, British soldiers generally subsisted on low-quality canned food, such as pork and beans, British bully beef, canned sausages, and Maconochie's stew. However, by 1916, widespread dissatisfaction and increasing complaints about the poor quality of most canned food distributed to soldiers, resulted in armies seeking better-quality food to improve morale, and soon, complete meals-in-a-can began to appear. In 1917, the French Army began issuing canned French cuisine such as coq au vin, beef bourguignon, French onion soup, and leek soup, while the Italian Army experimented with canned spaghetti with Bolognese sauce, ravioli, minestrone and pasta e fagioli. Following the war, companies that had supplied canned food to the military, began to improve the quality of their goods for civilian sale.

== Methods ==
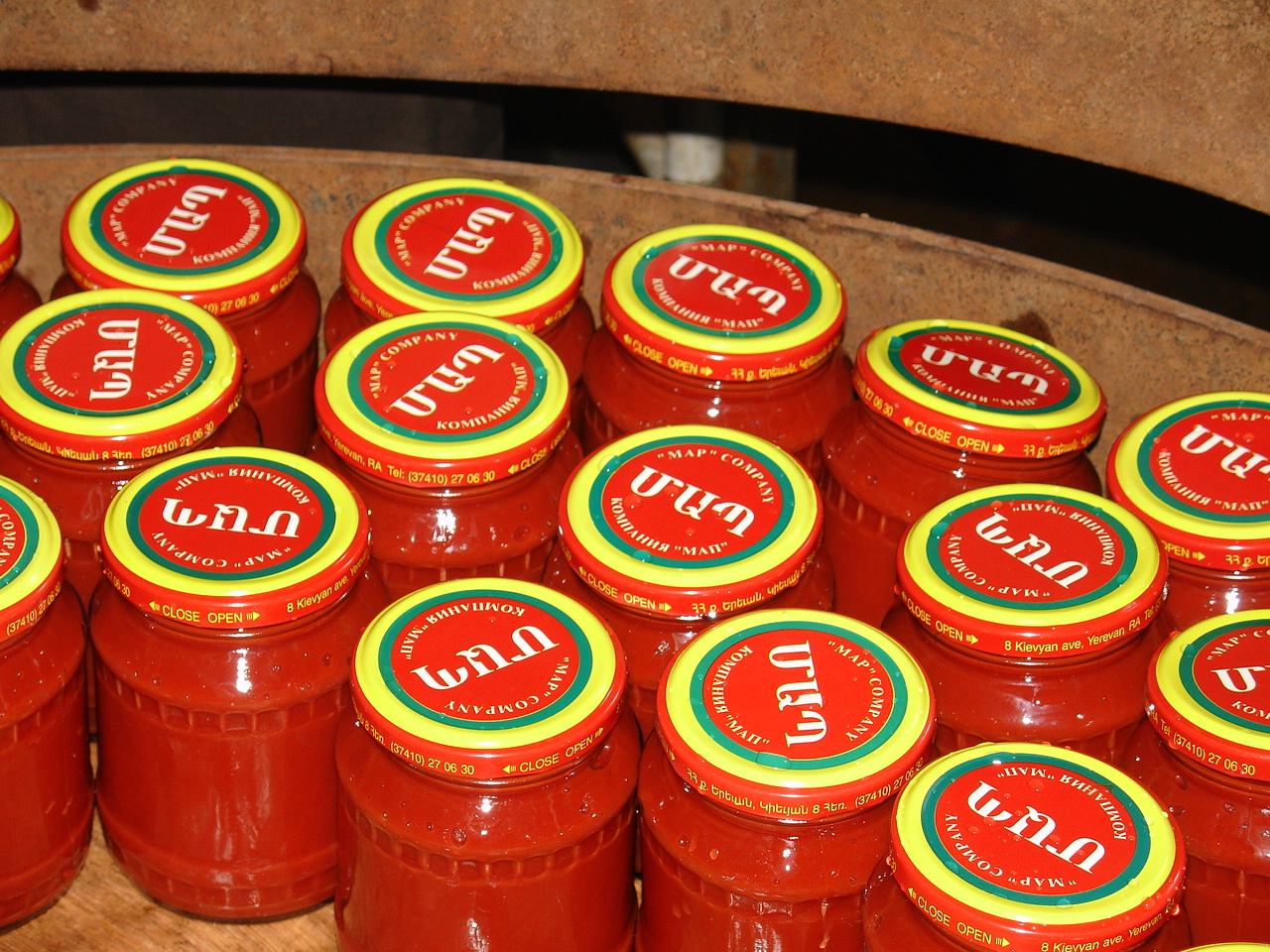
Modern glass jars from Armenia

The original fragile and heavy glass containers presented challenges for transportation, and glass jars were largely replaced in commercial canneries with cylindrical tin can or wrought-iron canisters (later shortened to "cans") following the work of Peter Durand (1810). Cans are cheaper and quicker to make, and much less fragile than glass jars.

Can openers were not invented for another thirty years. At first, soldiers would cut the cans open with bayonets or smash them open with rocks. Today, tin-coated steel is the material most commonly used. Aseptically processed retort pouches are also used for canning.

Glass jars have remained popular for some high-value products and in home canning.

=== Microbial control ===
To prevent the food from being spoiled before and during containment, a number of methods are used: pasteurisation, boiling (and other applications of high temperature over a period of time), refrigeration, freezing, drying, vacuum treatment, antimicrobial agents that are natural to the recipe of the foods being preserved, a sufficient dose of ionizing radiation, submersion in a strong saline solution, acid, base, osmotically extreme (for example very sugary) or other microbially-challenging environments.

Other than sterilization, no method is perfectly dependable as a preservative. Sterilization is done after the can is sealed, so that both the container and the food are secured.

The spores of the microorganism Clostridium botulinum (which causes botulism) can be eliminated only at temperatures above the boiling point of water. As a result, from a public safety point of view, foods with low acidity (a pH more than 4.6) need sterilization under high temperature (116–130 °C). To achieve temperatures above the boiling point requires the use of a pressure canner. Foods that must be pressure canned include most vegetables, meat, seafood, poultry, and dairy products. The only foods that may be safely canned in an ordinary boiling water bath are highly acidic ones with a pH below 4.6, such as fruits, pickled vegetables, or other foods to which acidic additives have been added. Although an ordinary boiling temperature does not kill botulism spores, the acidity is enough to stop them from growing.

=== Sealing: double seams ===
Invented in 1888 by Max Ams, modern double seams provide an airtight seal to a can. This airtight nature is crucial to keeping micro-organisms out of the can and keeping the can's contents sealed inside. Thus, double seamed cans are also known as Sanitary Cans. Developed in 1900 in Europe, this sort of can was made of the traditional cylindrical body made with tin plate. The two ends (lids) were attached using what is now called a double seam. A can thus sealed is impervious to contamination by creating two tight continuous folds between the can's cylindrical body and the lids. This eliminated the need for solder and allowed improvements in manufacturing speed, reducing cost.

Double seaming uses rollers to shape the can, lid and the final double seam. To make a sanitary can and lid suitable for double seaming, manufacture begins with a sheet of coated tin plate. To create the can body, rectangles are cut and curled around a die, and welded together creating a cylinder with a side seam.

Rollers are then used to flare out one or both ends of the cylinder to create a quarter circle flange around the circumference. Precision is required to ensure that the welded sides are perfectly aligned, as any misalignment will cause inconsistent flange shape, compromising its integrity.

A circle is then cut from the sheet using a die cutter. The circle is shaped in a stamping press to create a downward countersink to fit snugly into the can body. The result can be compared to an upside down and very flat top hat. The outer edge is then curled down and around about 140 degrees using rollers to create the end curl.

The result is a steel tube with a flanged edge, and a countersunk steel disc with a curled edge. A rubber compound is put inside the curl.

==== Seaming ====
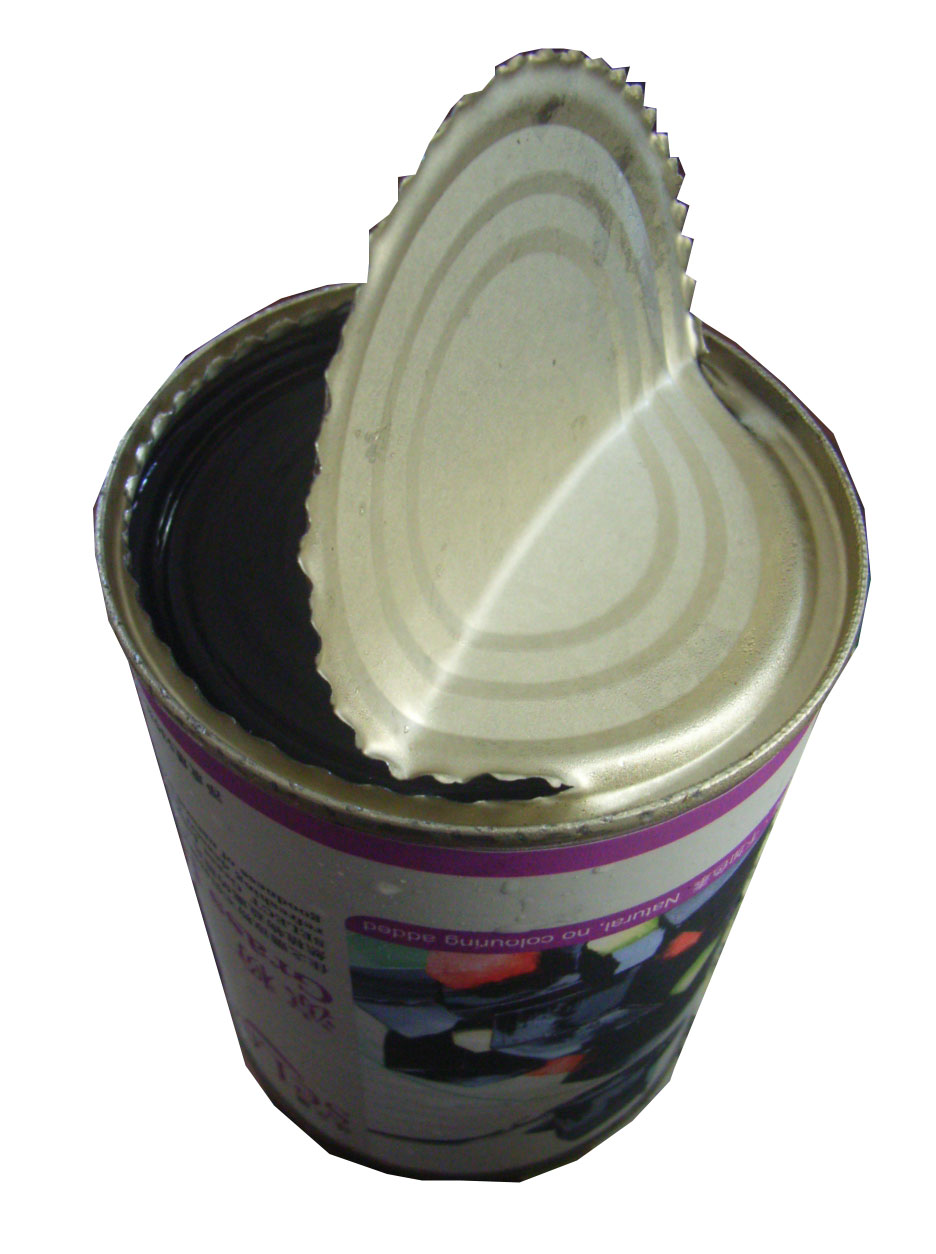
An opened tin can

The body and end are brought together in a seamer and held in place by the base plate and chuck, respectively. The base plate provides a sure footing for the can body during the seaming operation and the chuck fits snugly into the end (lid). The result is the countersink of the end sits inside the top of the can body just below the flange. The end curl protrudes slightly beyond the flange.

==== First operation ====
Once brought together in the seamer, the seaming head presses a first operation roller against the end curl. The end curl is pressed against the flange curling it in toward the body and under the flange. The flange is also bent downward, and the end and body are now loosely joined. The first operation roller is then retracted. At this point five thicknesses of steel exist in the seam. From the outside in they are:

- End
- Body hook
- Cover hook
- Body
- Countersink

==== Second operation ====
The seaming head then engages the second operation roller against the partly formed seam. The second operation presses all five steel components together tightly to form the final seal. The five layers in the final seam are then called; a) End, b) Body Hook, c) Cover Hook, d) Body, e) Countersink. All sanitary cans require a filling medium within the seam because otherwise the metal-to-metal contact will not maintain a hermetic seal. In most cases, a rubberized compound is placed inside the end curl radius, forming the critical seal between the end and the body.

Probably the most important innovation since the introduction of double seams is the welded side seam. Prior to the welded side seam, the can body was folded and/or soldered together, leaving a relatively thick side seam. The thick side seam required that the side seam end juncture at the end curl to have more metal to curl around before closing in behind the Body Hook or flange, with a greater opportunity for error.

==== Seamer setup and quality assurance ====
Many different parts during the seaming process are critical in ensuring that a can is airtight and vacuum sealed. The dangers of a can that is not hermetically sealed are contamination by foreign objects (bacteria or fungicide sprays), or that the can could leak or spoil.

One important part is the seamer setup. This process is usually performed by an experienced technician. Among the parts that need setup are seamer rolls and chucks which have to be set in their exact position (using a feeler gauge or a clearance gauge). The lifter pressure and position, roll and chuck designs, tooling wear, and bearing wear all contribute to a good double seam.

Incorrect setups can be non-intuitive. For example, due to the springback effect, a seam can appear loose, when in reality it was closed too tight and has opened up like a spring. For this reason, experienced operators and good seamer setup are critical to ensure that double seams are properly closed.

Quality control usually involves taking full cans from the line – one per seamer head, at least once or twice per shift, and performing a teardown operation (wrinkle/tightness), mechanical tests (external thickness, seamer length/height and countersink) as well as cutting the seam open with a twin blade saw and measuring with a double seam inspection system. The combination of these measurements will determine the seam's quality.

Use of a statistical process control (SPC) software in conjunction with a manual double-seam monitor, computerized double seam scanner, or even a fully automatic double seam inspection system makes the laborious process of double seam inspection faster and much more accurate. Statistically tracking the performance of each head or seaming station of the can seamer allows for better prediction of can seamer issues, and may be used to plan maintenance when convenient, rather than to simply react after bad or unsafe cans have been produced.

== Nutritional value ==
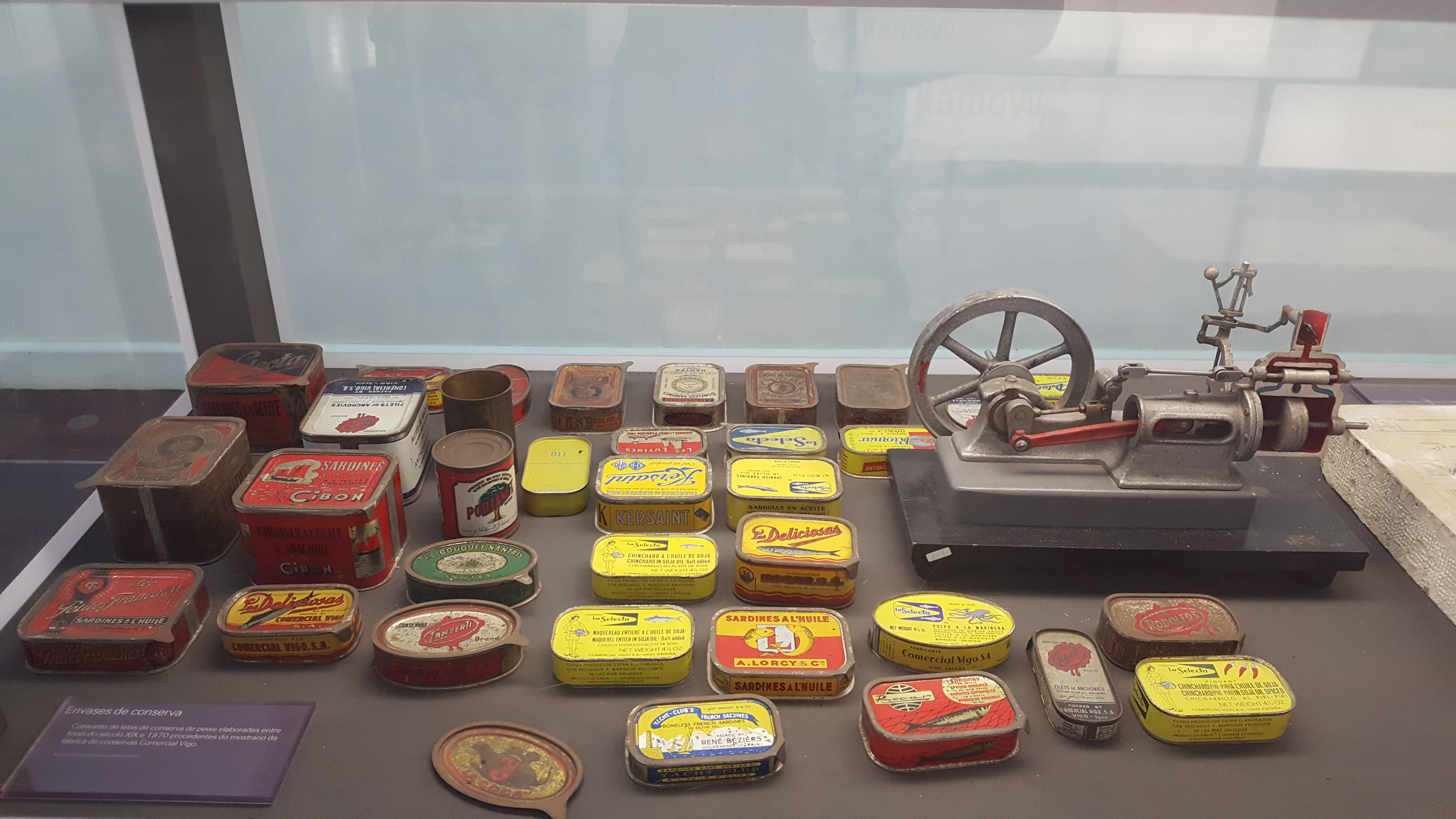
1970s canned food exposition in Museo del Mar de Galicia (Museum of Sea in Galicia)

Canning is a way of processing food to extend its shelf life. The idea is to make food available and edible long after the processing time. A 1997 study found that canned fruits and vegetables are as rich with dietary fiber and vitamins as the same corresponding fresh or frozen foods, and in some cases the canned products are richer than their fresh or frozen counterparts. The heating process during canning appears to make dietary fiber more soluble, and therefore more readily fermented in the colon into gases and physiologically active byproducts. Canned tomatoes have a higher available lycopene content. Consequently, canned meat and vegetables are often among the list of food items that are stocked during emergencies.

== Potential hazards ==
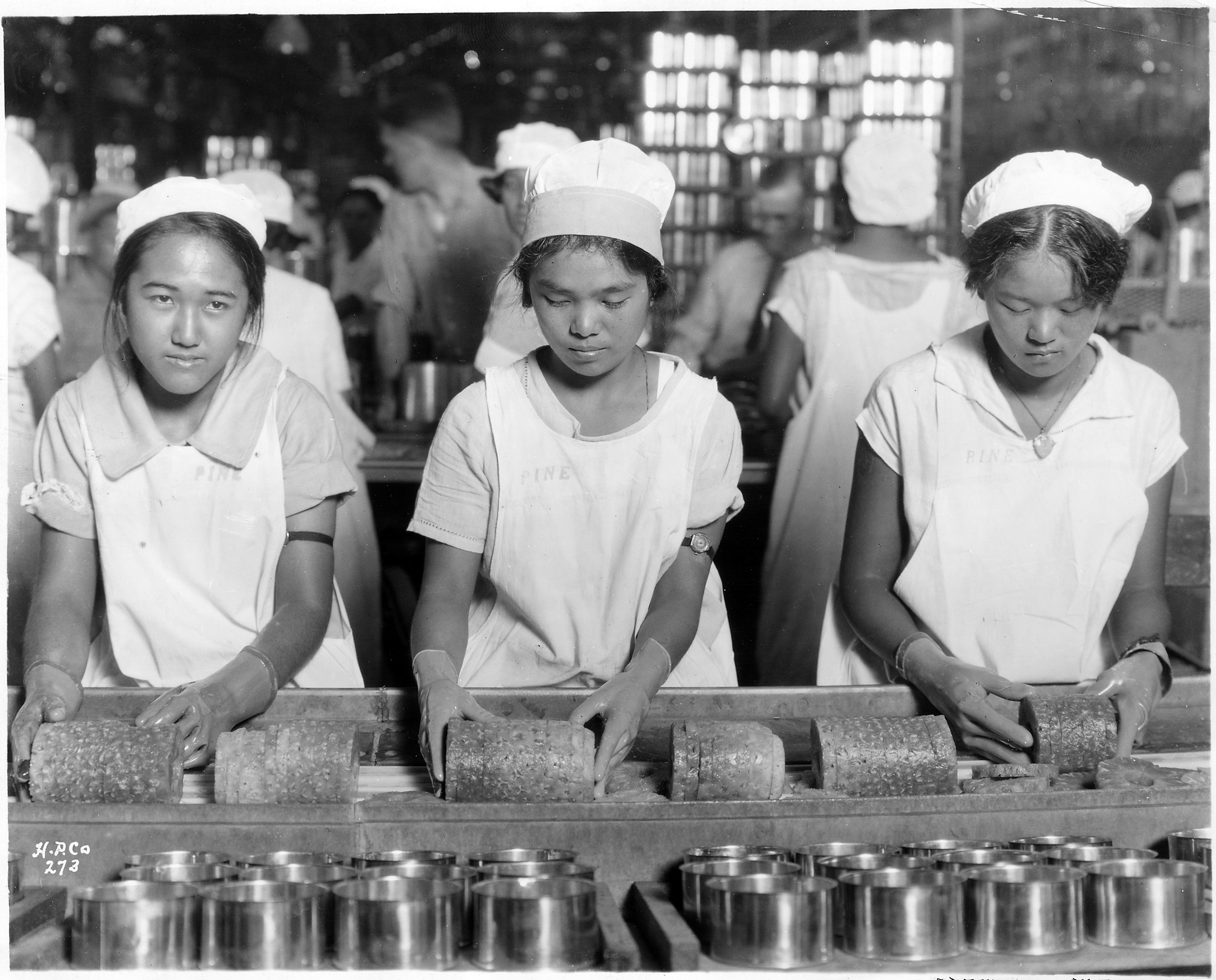
Hawaiian women working at a pineapple cannery in 1928

In the beginning of the 19th century the process of canning foods was mainly done by small canneries. These canneries were full of overlooked sanitation problems, such as poor hygiene and unsanitary work environments. Since the refrigerator did not exist and industrial canning standards were not set in place it was very common for contaminated cans to slip onto the grocery store shelves.

According to The Fruits of Empire: Art, Food and the Politics of Race in the Age of American Expansion by Shana Klein, "Workers also suffered injuries, specifically bruised knuckles and open sores, from trimming and packaging pineapples. Gloves were one preventative measure to protect a canner's hands from the acidity of the pineapple, but gloves did not always help."

=== Migration of can components ===
In canning toxicology, migration is the movement of substances from the can itself into the contents. One toxic substance that can migrate is lead, which causes lead poisoning, but has been phased out of usage in cans since the 20th century. A newer concern is bisphenol A (BPA), a potential endocrine disruptor that is an ingredient in the epoxy commonly used to coat the inner surface of cans. Some cans are manufactured with a BPA-free enamel lining produced from plant oils and resins. In February 2018, the Can Manufacturers Institute, a trade association in the United States, surveyed the industry and reported that at least 90% of food cans no longer contained BPA.

=== Salt content ===
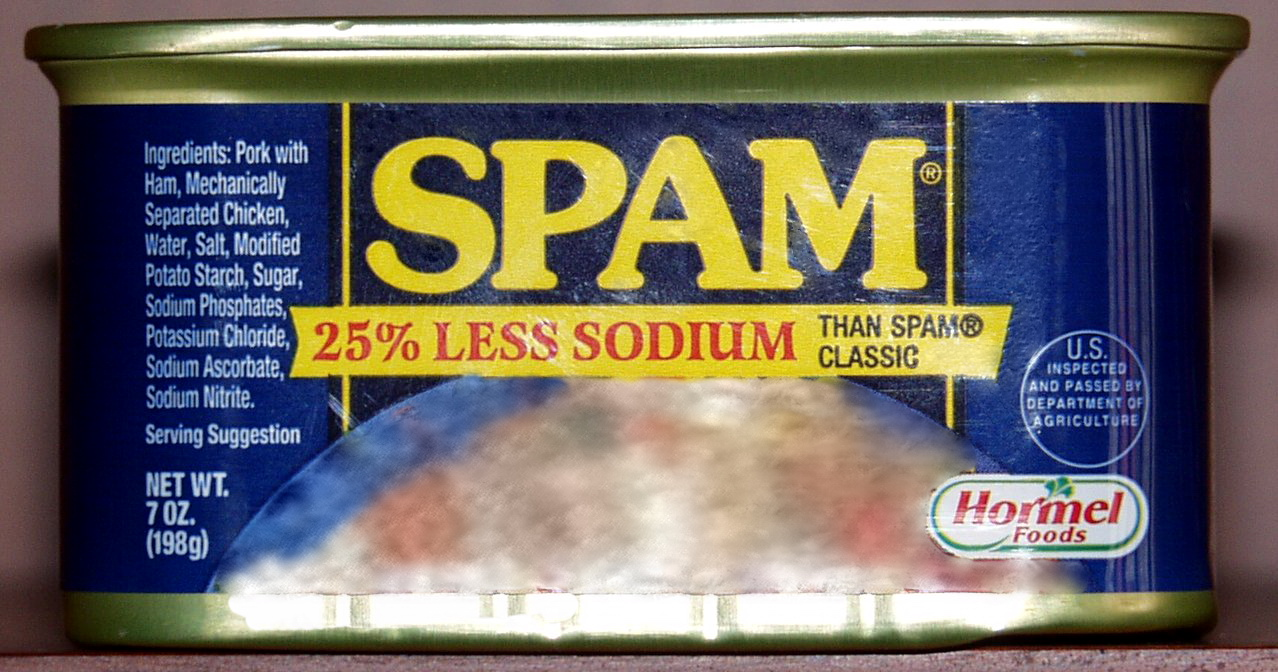
Can of SPAM in 2005, boasting a 25% (one quarter) sodium content reduction

Salt (sodium chloride), dissolved in water, is used in the canning process, which helps prevent spoilage and can improve sensory characteristics. As a result, canned food can be a major source of dietary salt. Too much salt increases the risk of health problems, including high blood pressure. Therefore, health authorities have recommended limitations of dietary sodium. Many canned products are available in low-salt and no-salt alternatives.

Rinsing thoroughly after opening may reduce the amount of salt in canned vegetables, since much of the salt content is thought to be in the liquid, rather than the food itself.

=== Botulism ===
Foodborne botulism results from contaminated foodstuffs in which C. botulinum spores have been allowed to germinate and produce botulism toxin, and this typically occurs in canned non-acidic food substances that have not received a strong enough thermal heat treatment. C. botulinum prefers low oxygen environments and is a poor competitor to other bacteria, but its spores are resistant to thermal treatments. When a canned food is sterilized insufficiently, most other bacteria besides the C. botulinum spores are killed, and the spores can germinate and produce botulism toxin. Botulism is a rare but serious paralytic illness, leading to paralysis that typically starts with the muscles of the face and then spreads towards the limbs. The botulinum toxin is extremely dangerous because it cannot be detected by sight or smell, and ingestion of even a small amount of the toxin can be deadly. In severe forms, it leads to paralysis of the breathing muscles and causes respiratory failure. In view of this life-threatening complication, all suspected cases of botulism are treated as medical emergencies, and public health officials are usually involved to prevent further cases from the same source.

== Canning and economic recession ==
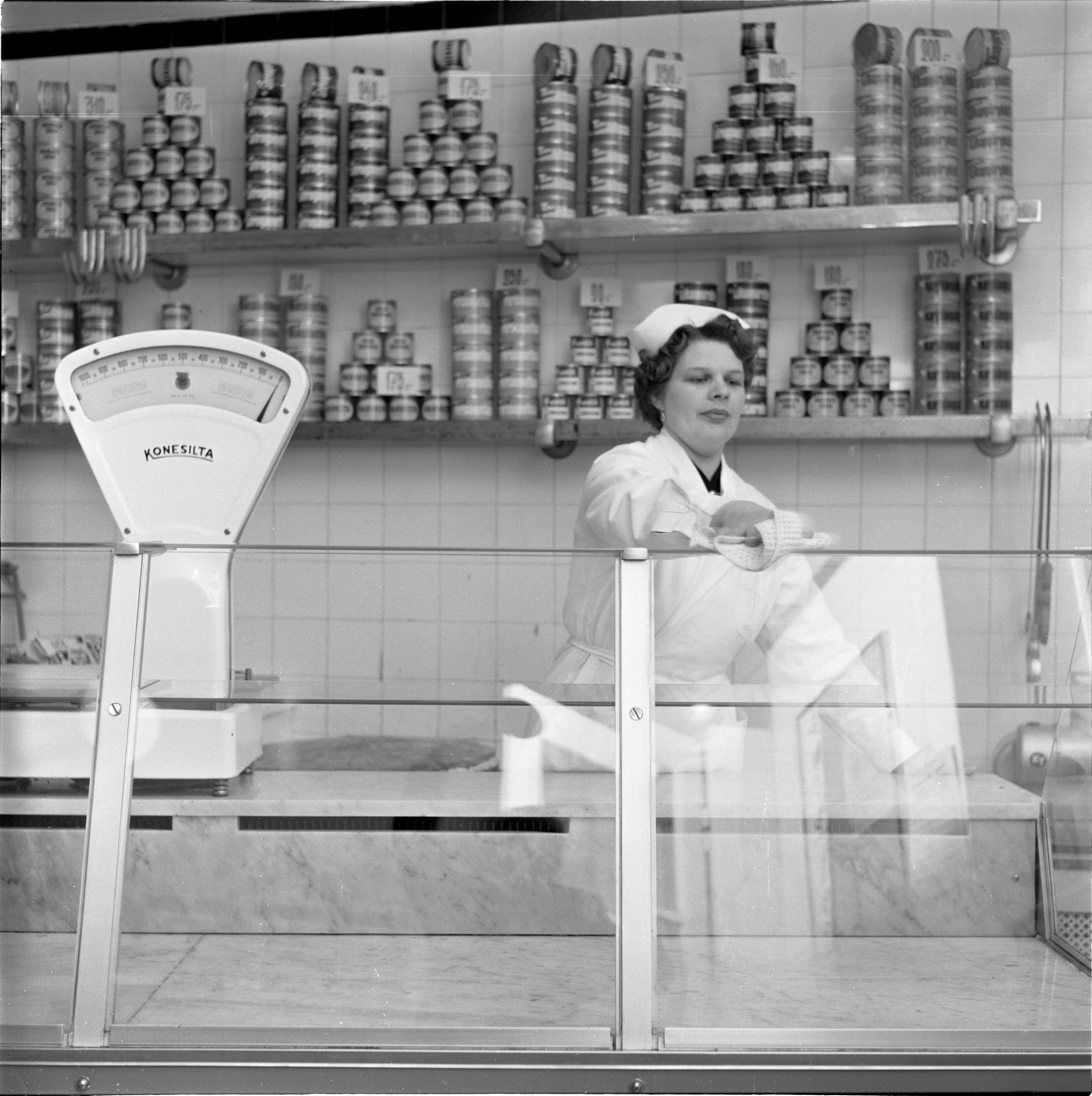
Canned meat on the shelves of an Elanto store in Helsinki, Finland in 1962

Canned goods and canning supplies tend to sell well during economic recessions as financially stressed consumers engage in cocooning, a behavior in which people stay home and reduce discretionary spending such as dining out and entertainment. Also, some people may become preppers and proceed to stockpile canned food.

In February 2009 during a recession, the United States saw an 11.5% rise in sales of canning-related items.

Some communities in the US have county canning centers which are available for teaching canning, or shared community kitchens which can be rented for canning one's own foods.

== See also ==
- Amanda Jones, inventor of a vacuum method of canning
- Steel and tin cans, most commonly associated with canned food
  - Can opener
- Home canning
- Canned fish
  - Salmon cannery
- Food industry
- Food preservation
  - Food drying
    - List of dried foods
  - Pasteurization
  - Thermal death time
- Drink can
  - Canned water
- List of canneries
  - Cannery Row
- Canstruction non-profit organization
