= Rockslide =

Type of landslide caused by rock failure

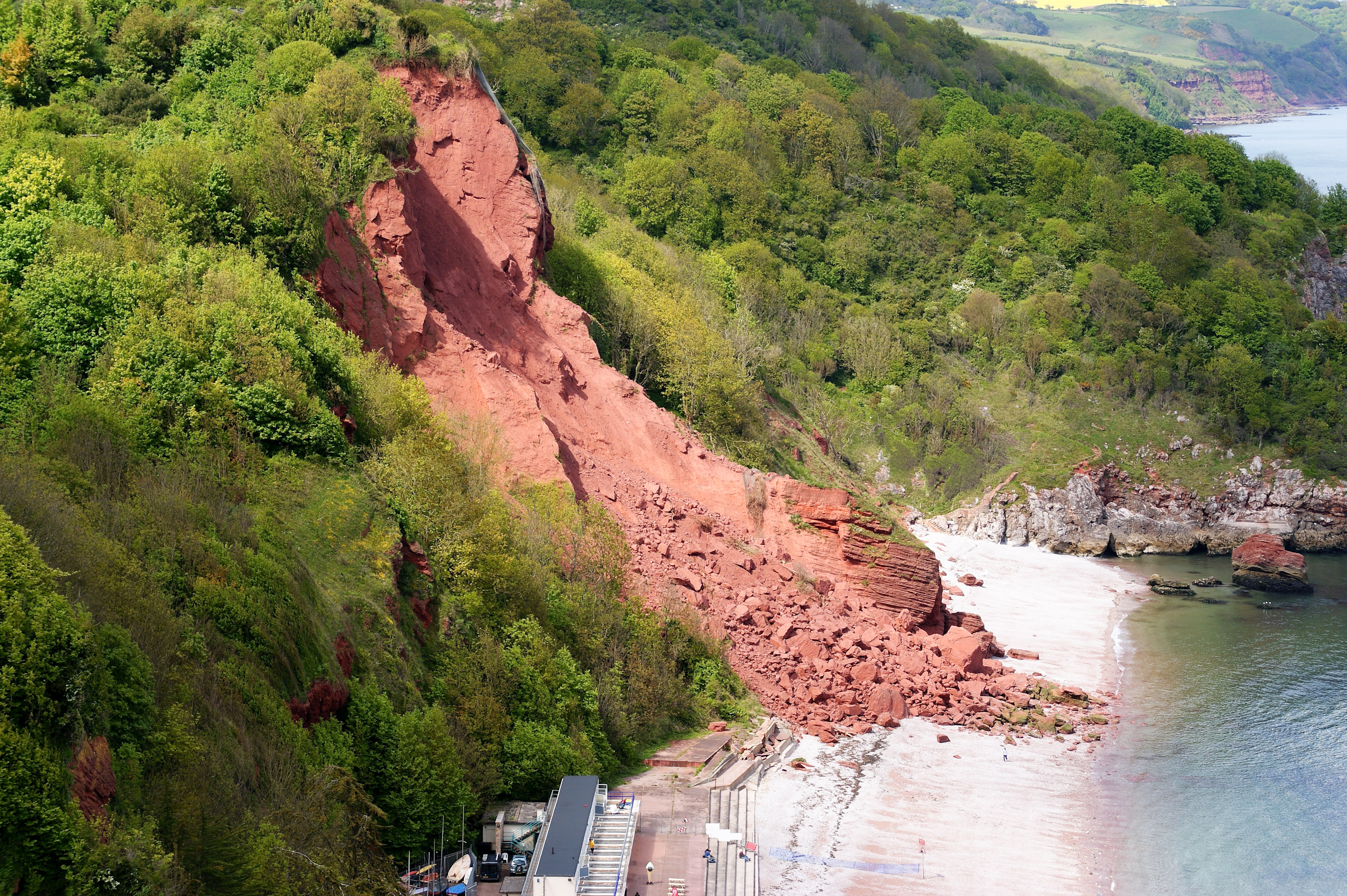
Rockslide at Oddicombe Beach in Devon, UK

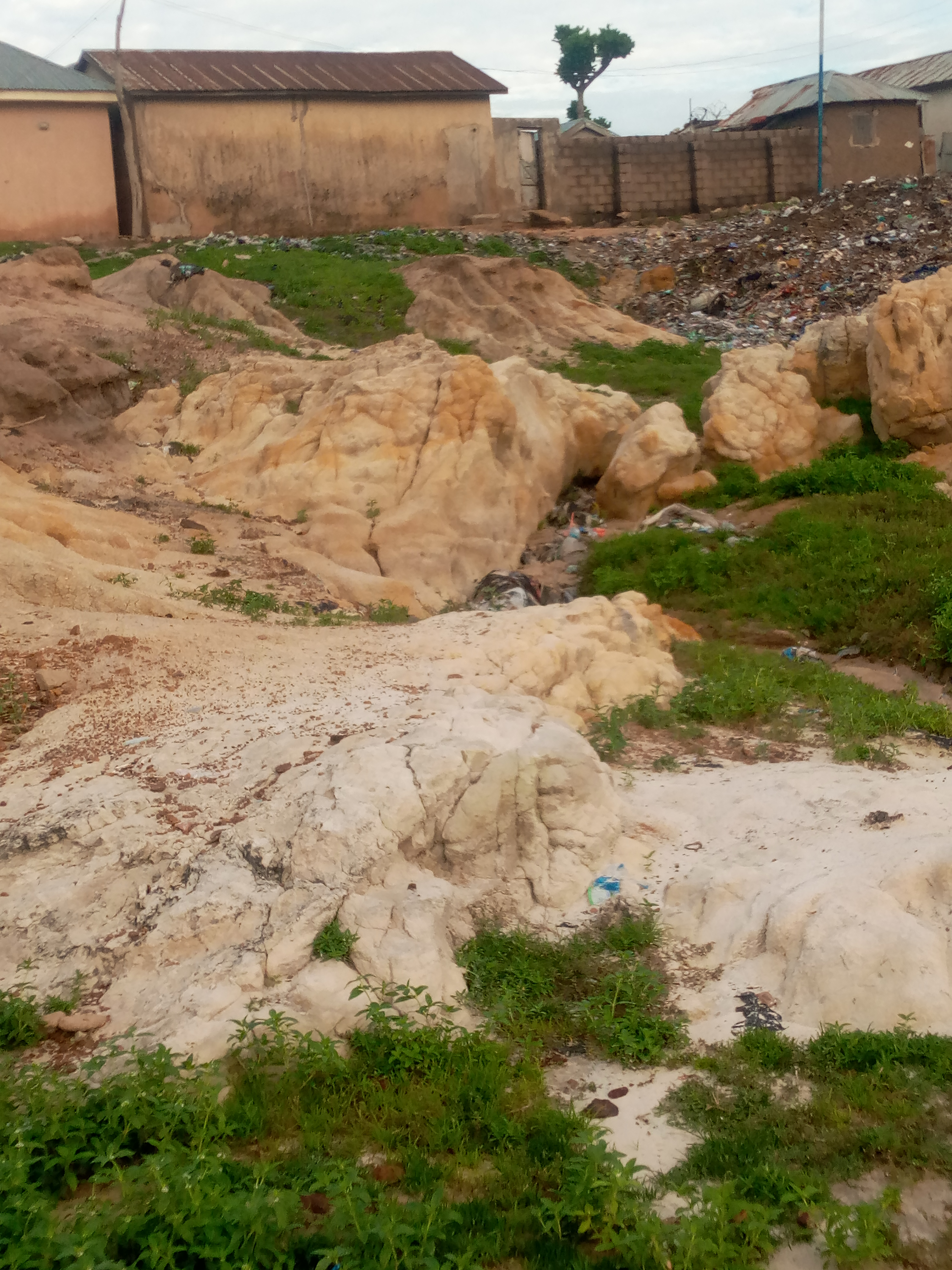
Rockslides in Nigeria

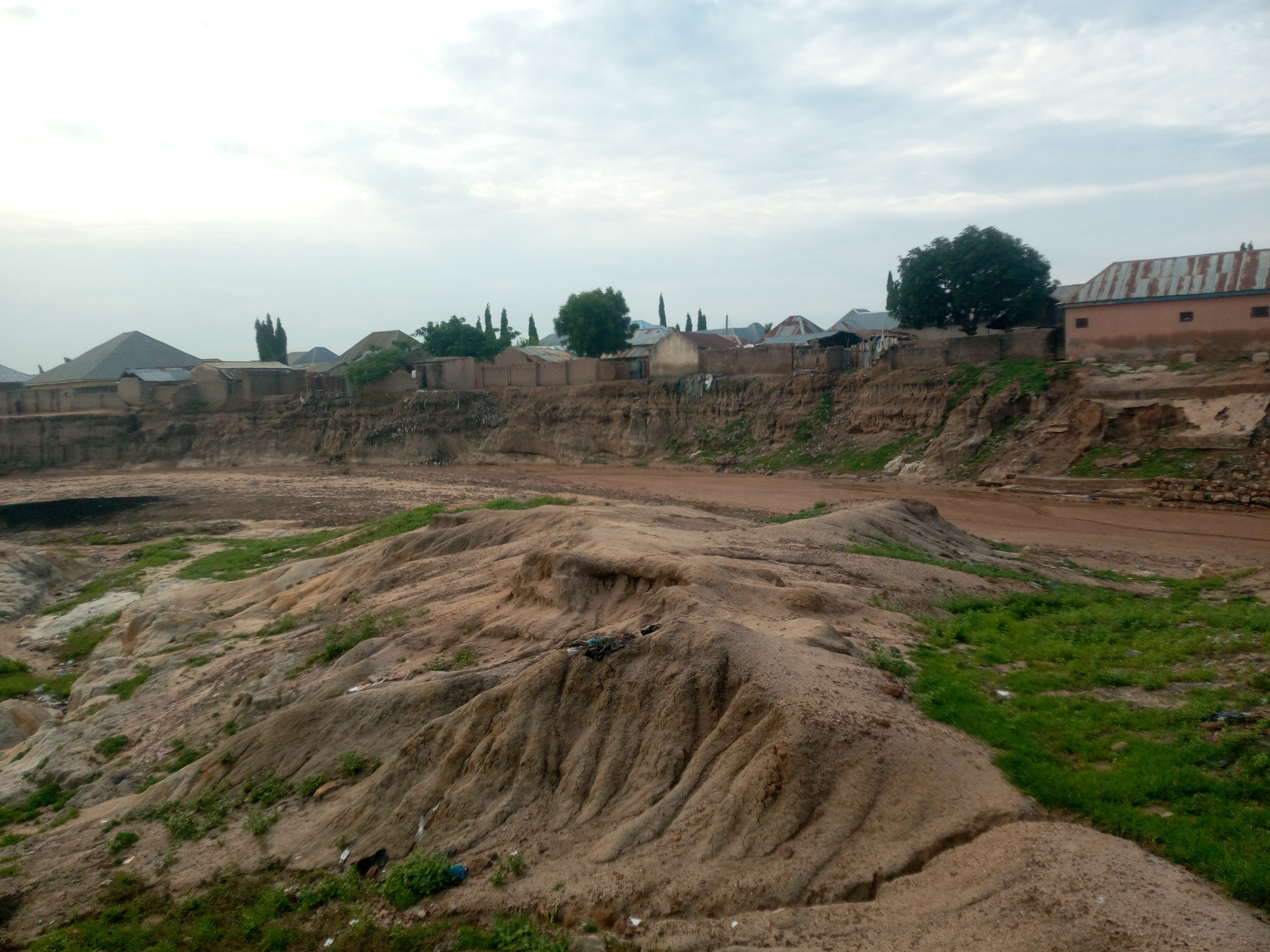
Landslips

A rockslide is a type of landslide caused by rock failure in which part of the bedding plane of failure passes through compacted rock and material collapses en masse and not in individual blocks. While a landslide occurs when loose dirt or sediment falls down a slope, a rockslide occurs only when solid rocks are transported down slope. The rocks tumble downhill, loosening other rocks on their way and smashing everything in their path. Fast-flowing rock slides behave similarly to snow avalanches, and are therefore sometimes referred to as rock avalanches.

== Definition ==
The term landslide refers to a variety of mass wasting events (geologic slope failures) that include slumps, slides, falls, and flows. The two major types of slides are rotational slides and translational slides. Rockslides are a type of translational event since the rock mass moves along a roughly planar surface with little rotation or backward tilting. Rock slides are the most dangerous form of mass-wasting because they incorporate a sudden, incredibly fast-paced release of bedrock along a uniform plane of weakness. These uniform weaknesses are key to identifying rock slides because unlike slumps, flows, or falls, the failed material moves in a fairly uniform direction over a layer of solid, pre-existing rock. Rock may break down while falling during rockslides.

The sudden, rapid release of material found in rock slides combined with the sheer size and weight of the material that is falling is what gives these events the potential to have devastating effects on human life and infrastructure. Rock slides are very common in the over steepened canyons and drainages of Idaho, particularly in those areas like the Salmon River Canyon where more than 5,000 feet of elevation may exist between the ridge tops and the canyon bottoms.

== Causes ==
Mass-wasting occurs whenever the gravitational force on the rock exceeds the ability of the slope to resist that force. Therefore, anything that erodes or impedes the mountain's ability to resist this force may be one of the causes of mass-wasting. While a major event such as an earthquake can cause large rockslides to happen, a majority of slides occur due to a combination of gravitational pressure and erosional influences. Anthropogenic activities, such as altering the geometry of a hill through excavation, can also change the stress state, contributing to slope instability.

Amongst these erosional properties, water is arguably the most effective geologic agent that causes mass-wasting events to occur. Water aids in the downslope movement of surface material by adding weight to the soil and by filling pores which tends to push apart individual grains, decreasing the resistance of the material to movement. While these processes can cause a slide to happen, the speed and potential devastation of a rockslide is often determined by the severity of steepness presented by the failing slope.

== Disaster prevention ==
With increasing populations in rural areas around the world, the hazards presented by potential rock slides are becoming an increasingly pressing issue. In preparation, individuals working in the fields of geologic science and engineering continue to perfect methods of rock slide detection, assessment, and warning.

New earth observation tools have supplied a much enhanced ability to detect potential rock slide hazards with analysis of sequential InSAR and LiDAR data that provides a regional view of slope movement. Once susceptible areas are discovered, detailed analysis can be carried out at the specific site. These assessments are used to determine the amount of material that will be released as well as the speed at which this material will be transported.

Once a site is deemed hazardous, different types of geologic engineering techniques are used in order to prevent the compromised slope from failing. Some of these designs are listed below.

Wire meshing
A corrosion resistant material that is installed at the crest and foot of the slope. This insures that any falling debris is trapped behind the mesh.

Retaining walls
One of the oldest forms of ground engineering, retaining walls are built in order to neutralize the effects of unstable slopes by holding fallen rocks and soil back from roads and other structures.

Soil nailing
An economical method of constructing a form of retaining wall from the top of a slope down. In this process closely spaced steel tendons are drilled into the soil. These nails significantly increase the cohesion of soil through the ability of these rods to carry tensile loads. these steel beams are usually reinforced through the use of welded wire mesh.

Rock bolting
Rock bolts are always a primary means of reinforcement, Bolts are placed in a specific pattern in order to transfer the faces load from the slopes exterior, to its interior.

== See also ==
- Rock-ice avalanche, type of landslide involving a mixture of rock and ice.
- Sturzstrom, a unique type of landslide consisting of soil and rock in which the horizontal movement greatly surpasses the vertical movement.
