= Babbacombe Cliff Railway =

Funicular railway in Torquay, Devon, England

Coordinates: 50.4816°N 3.5166°W

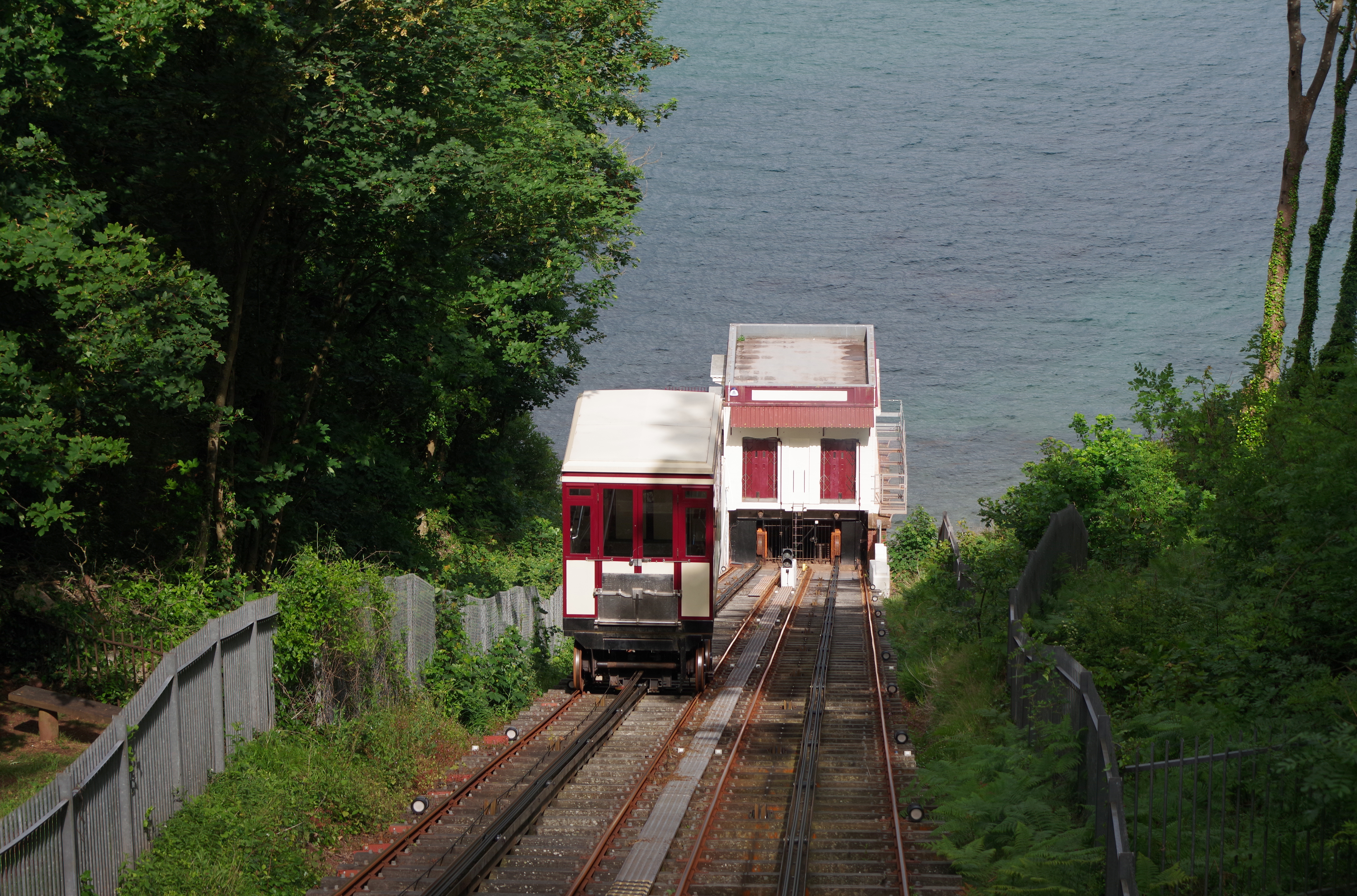

Overview
- Status: in use
- Locale: Babbacombe, Torquay, England, United Kingdom

Service
- Type: Funicular

History
- Opened: April 1, 1926

Technical
- Line length: 720-foot (220 m)
- Number of tracks: Double track
- Track gauge: 5 ft 8 in (1,727 mm)
- Maximum incline: 1 in 2.83

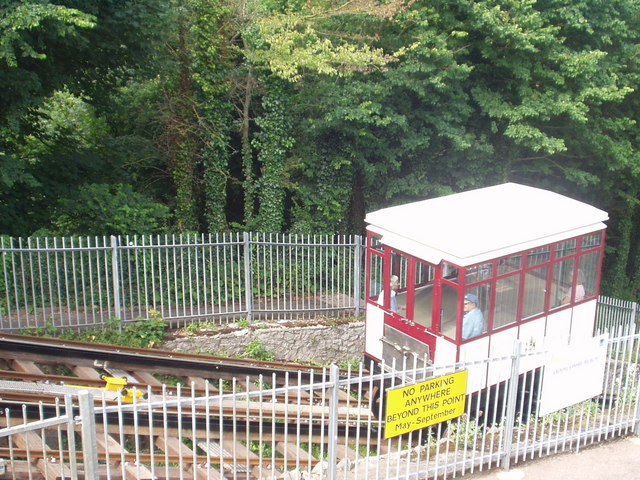
A car of the cliff railway

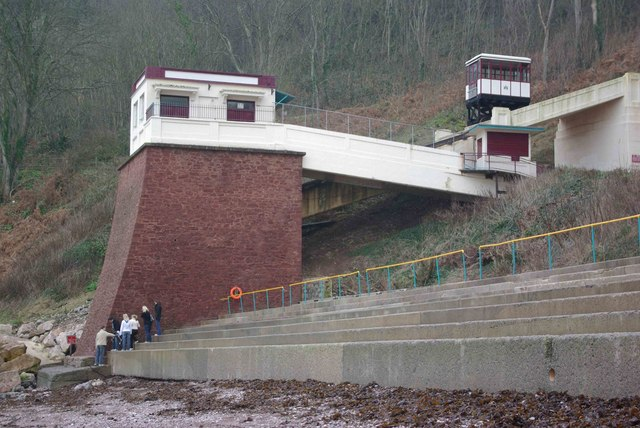
The lower station of the cliff railway

Babbacombe Cliff Railway, also known as the Babbacombe Cliff Lift, is a funicular railway in the town of Torquay in the English county of Devon. It links Babbacombe Downs with Oddicombe Beach. The line formerly ran every day between 09:30 and 17:30, with a closure period in winter for maintenance. A bell is rung 30 and 15 minutes before closing.

== History ==
The idea of a cliff railway appears as early as 1890 when proposals started to grow in public favour. The idea originated with Charles Richardson C.C. of Cary Castle, St Marychurch, and taken up and promoted by George Newnes M.P. based on the similar railway at Lynton. However, this scheme did not come to fruition and was abandoned in 1893. The proposal was revived in 1907 but no progress was made. The proposal was still being discussed in 1914 at the outbreak of the First World War.

In February 1923, the Torquay Tramway Company commissioned Waygood-Otis Ltd with the engineering and construction of the railway. Construction started in 1924, and the line was first opened on 1 April 1926. The line cost £15,648 (equivalent to £827,000 in 2025) to construct. The tramway company continued to work the line until 13 March 1935, when it was taken over by Torquay Borough Council. The line was closed in 1941, due to World War II security restrictions, and reopened in 1951 after modernisation by Messrs J & E Hall of Dartford. The fare in 1951 was 6d return (equivalent to £1.32 in 2025), 4d up and 3d down.

The railway underwent further refurbishment in 1993 and a three-year programme of renovation commenced in November 2005.

In July 2009, the ownership of the line was transferred from Torbay Council, who had inherited ownership from Torquay Borough Council as a result of local government reorganisation, to a specially created community interest company. In 2019, the CIC converted to become a charitable incorporated organisation.

== Specifications ==
- Two cars of traditional funicular design with a 40-person standing capacity
- 720-foot (220 m) track with a 5 ft 8 in (1,727 mm) gauge
- Rated speed of 2.5 metres per second (8.2 ft/s)
- Drive equipment located at the top station
- Direct current wattage drive system, incorporating servomotor-operated controller
- Hoisting ropes attached to upper ends of car chassis, supplemented by a compensating rope system to load balance for car position on track

== Incidents ==
On 4 September 2022, an engineer from the railway was killed in what was described as an industrial incident. It re-opened in July 2023. It had to close again in August 2023 while repairs were made.

== See also ==
- St Marychurch
- List of funicular railways
