= Bryan Donkin =

British civil engineer (1768–1855)

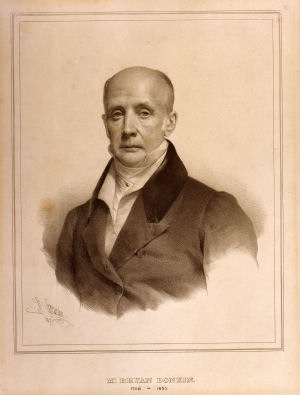
- Born: 22 March 1768
- Died: 27 February 1855 (aged 86); Walworth, London
- Resting place: Nunhead Cemetery
- Known for: Paper making machine and canning process
- Spouse: Mary Brames
- Children: 11
- Parent(s): John Donkin and Jane Soppitt

Bryan Donkin FRS FRAS (22 March 1768 – 27 February 1855) was a British civil engineer who developed the first paper making machine and created the world's first commercial canning factory. These were the basis for large industries that continue to flourish today. Bryan Donkin was involved with Thomas Telford's Caledonian Canal, Marc and Isambard Brunel's Thames Tunnel, and Charles Babbage's computer. He was an advisor to the government and held in high esteem by his peers.

== Early life ==
Raised in Sandhoe, Northumberland, his father was a surveyor and land agent. Donkin initially began work in the same business, and worked from September 1789 to February 1791 as bailiff at Knole House and estate for the Duke of Dorset.

== Career ==
While working for the Duke of Dorset, Donkin consulted the engineer John Smeaton, an acquaintance of his father, as to how he could become an engineer. At Smeaton's advice in 1792 he apprenticed himself to John Hall in Dartford, Kent, who had founded the Dartford Iron Works (later J & E Hall) in 1785. Shortly after completing his apprenticeship, he set himself up in Dartford, with the support of John Hall, making moulds for paper works, for at that time all paper making was done by hand. In 1798 he married Mary Brames, daughter of Peter Brames, a neighbouring land owner and market gardener, and a prominent supporter of the Methodist movement. By doing so Donkin became brother in law to John Hall, who had married Mary's elder sister Sarah in 1791.

=== Fourdrinier machine ===
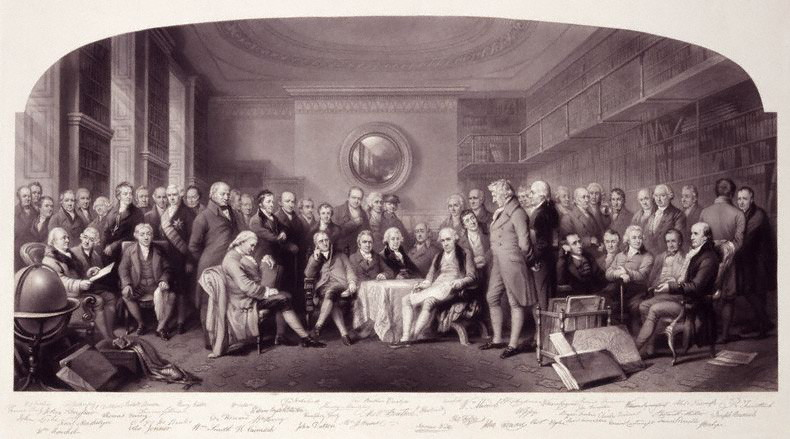
Distinguished Men of Science. Use the cursor to see who is who.

In 1801–2 Donkin took a prototype of a continuous paper-making machine, and started its transformation into the famous Fourdrinier machine which is the basis of modern paper-making. Donkin took premises at Bermondsey, London in 1802, thus starting the enterprise that became the Bryan Donkin Company, which still continues in business in the early 21st century. In 1804 he succeeded in producing a working machine. A second, improved one, was made the following year and in 1810 eighteen of the complex machines had been erected at various mills. Although the original design was not Donkin's, he received the credit for having perfected them and brought them into use. His company continued to make such machines, and by 1851 had produced nearly 200 machines for use across the world.

=== Printing machinery ===
Donkin also worked with printing machinery. In 1813 he and a printer, Richard Mackenzie Bacon of Norwich, obtained a patent for a "Polygonal printing machine"; this used types placed on a rotating square or hexagonal roller or "geometric prism". Ink was applied by a roller which rose and fell with the irregularities of the prism. One of these machines was set up for Cambridge University. It however proved too complicated and suffered from poor inking, which prevented its success. However, it was the first machine to introduce composition ink rollers which were considered better than the existing leather-covered rollers. Donkin's inking roller quickly became the industry standard.

=== Tinned food ===
Donkin became interested in canning food in metal containers. John Hall acquired Peter Durand's patent in 1812 for the sum of £1000 and after various experiments, and in association with Hall and Gamble, Donkin set up a canning factory in Bermondsey, the first cannery to use tinned iron containers. By late spring 1813 they were appointing agents on the south coast to sell preserved food to outbound ships. Soon the British Admiralty were placing sizeable orders with the firm of Donkin, Hall and Gamble for meat preserved in tinned iron canisters. The firm of Donkin, Hall and Gamble was later merged into Crosse & Blackwells. London's Science Museum has an early Donkin tin can.

=== Difference engine ===
During the 1820s and 1830s, Charles Babbage requested Donkin's assistance in resolving continuing disputes between Babbage and Joseph Clement who had been commissioned by Babbage to manufacture the difference engine. This included investigating the ownership of intellectual property, tooling and piece-parts of the difference engine.

Bryan Donkin retired from an active role in the business in 1846 at the age of 78. His sons John, Bryan and Thomas continued the business.

In 1857 the British government authorised the sum of £1,200 (equivalent to £117,322 in 2025) for a full-scale difference engine with attached printing apparatus based on the design of Per Georg Scheutz and his son Edvard to be constructed by Donkin's company, which had acquired a reputation for building machines for the colour printing of banknotes and stamps. Costs overran and the company delivered the machine in July 1859, several weeks past the deadline, incurring a loss of £615 (equivalent to £66,808 in 2025).

Despite the engine's printing unit working badly, the Royal Society and the Astronomer Royal were generally positive when they inspected it on 30 August 1859, expressing their satisfaction at its construction. Donkin was unhappy that he had lost so much money on the project, which he attributed to the engine's unexpected intricacy and the fact that he had very little to base his original cost estimate on, Edvard Scheutz having given him very little information. In addition, costly machine tools had had to be made specially to make the engine's components and many alterations had been introduced along the way.

The machine was used by William Farr at the General Register Office to compute life tables, which were published in 1864. It operated on 15-digit numbers and 4th-order differences, and produced printed output just as Charles Babbage had envisaged. This machine is now in the London Science Museum.

== Civil engineering ==
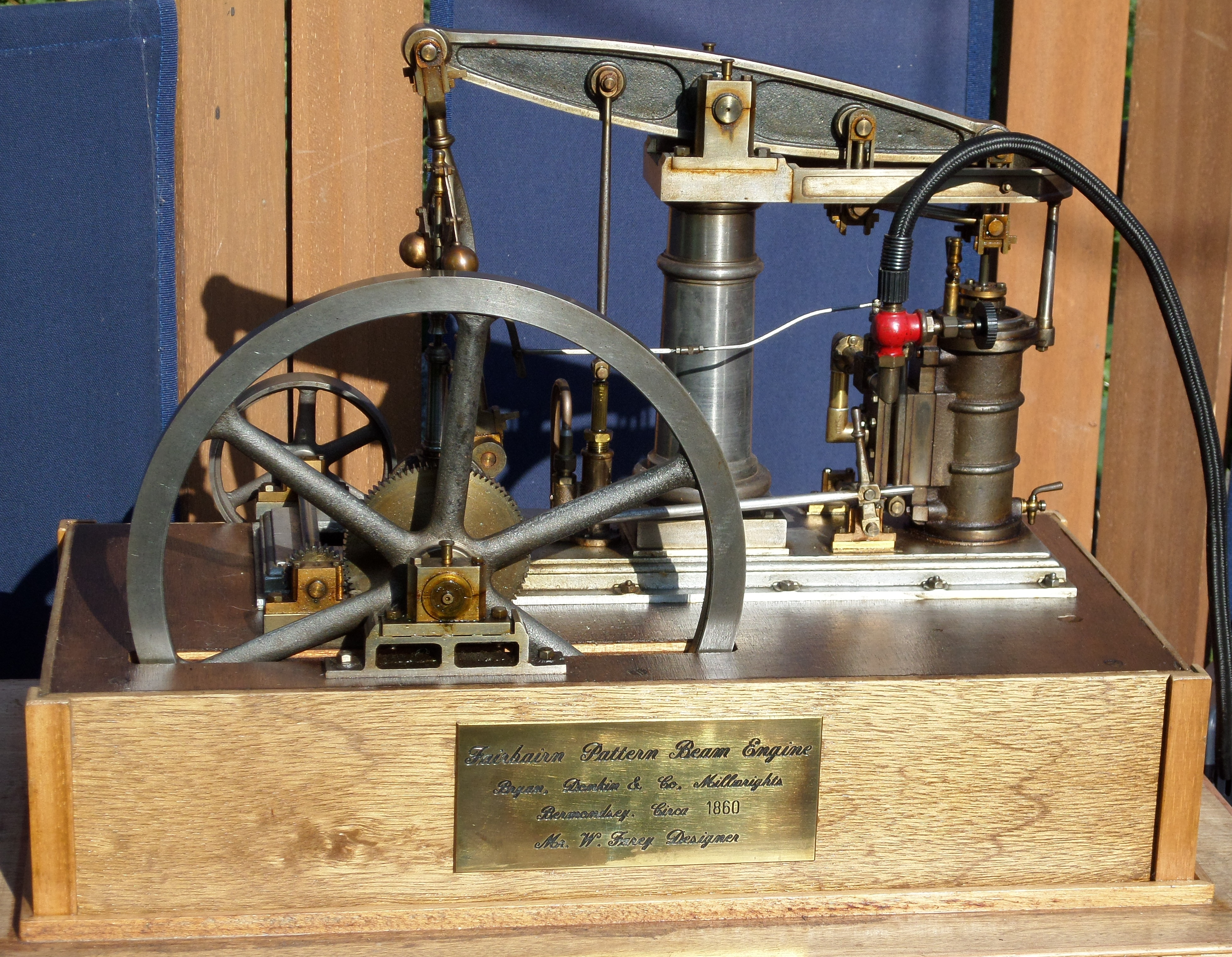
A model of a Fairbairn Pattern Beam Engine of circa 1860 as built by Bryan Donkin & Co.

In the 1820s Donkin became a director of the Thames Tunnel Company, having become acquainted with Marc Brunel when he had supplied equipment for his machinery at Chatham Dockyard. In 1825–27 Donkin supplied pumps for removing water from the tunnel and also workmen for modifying the tunnelling shield; at one time it was even suggested that he replace Brunel as engineer.

In 1826 he constructed a model of a landing stage proposed by Brunel for use at Liverpool.

Donkin's works regularly supplied machinery for use in civil engineering projects, including dredging machines for the Caledonian Canal in 1816, the Prussian government in 1817, the Göta Canal (Sweden) in 1821, and the Calder and Hebble Navigation in 1824. Stationary steam engines were also supplied for use in the construction of the locks on the Caledonian Canal.

As an eminent engineer, Donkin was often consulted on civil engineering matters. He supported Thomas Telford's 1814 proposals for a massive suspension bridge at Runcorn, and in 1821 reported along with Henry Maudslay on an iron bridge erected by Ralph Dodd at Springfield, Chelmsford. Thomas Telford employed Donkin in his survey of rivers in the London area for the Water Supply report, completed shortly before Telford's death.

== Other work ==
In 1820 Donkin worked with Sir William Congreve on preventing the forgery of excise stamps, using a method of two-colour printing with compound printing plates. Working with his partner John Wilks, he produced a machine which was used for the Excise and Stamp Office and also for the East India Company at Calcutta. This 'Rose Engine' is now at the Science Museum, London.

By 1847, Donkin's company had designed its first products for the emerging gas industry. The name Donkin has since become a generic name for certain gas valves and Bryan Donkin RMG Gas Controls Limited remains a going concern in Europe. AVK and Howden Blowers also continue manufacture of Bryan Donkin equipment.

Among Donkin's other inventions were a screw-cutting and dividing machine; an instrument to measure the velocity of rotating machinery; and an engine to count the rotations of a machine. The last two received the Royal Society of Arts Prize medal.

== Death ==
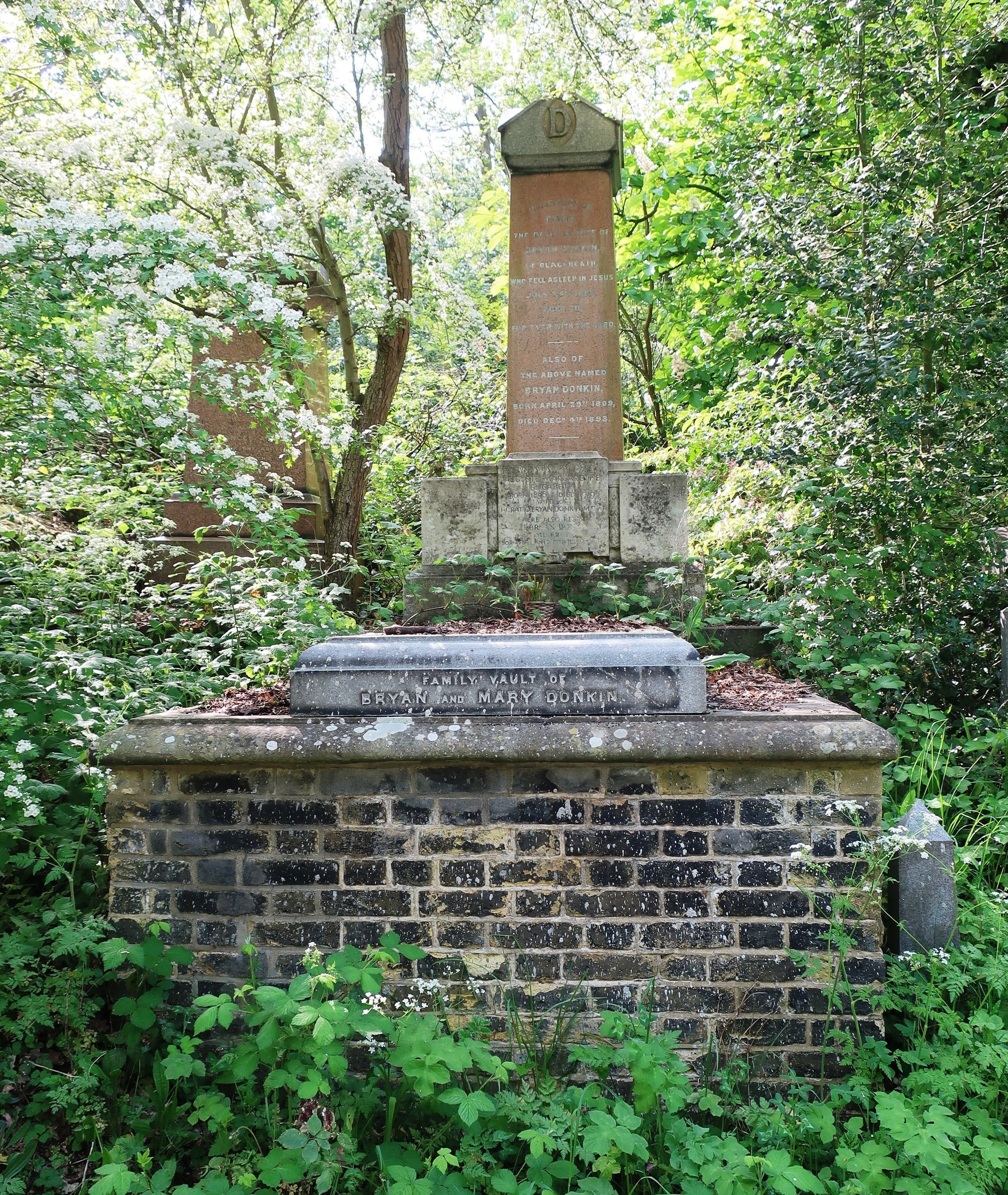
The Donkin family vault in Nunhead Cemetery

Donkin died at home in the New Kent Road, London, on 27 February 1855. He was buried in a vault in Nunhead Cemetery. His wife, Mary, died on 27 August 1858 and was buried in the same vault, as were other family members at later dates.

== Institutions ==
In 1805, with John Hall and others, he formed the Society of Master Millwrights, acting as its treasurer.

He was a member of the Society of Arts, becoming a vice-president and chairman of the Committee of Mechanics.

He was elected a fellow of the Royal Society in 1838.

Donkin was one of the originators and a vice-president of the Institution of Civil Engineers, which was founded by Henry Robinson Palmer, one of his pupils. He also helped the institution to obtain its royal charter in 1828, advancing 100 guineas towards the costs.

Donkin was elected a member of the Smeatonian Society of Civil Engineers in 1835 and served as its president in 1843.

He was a founder member of the Royal Astronomical Society and served on its council.
