= Double seam =

Canning process

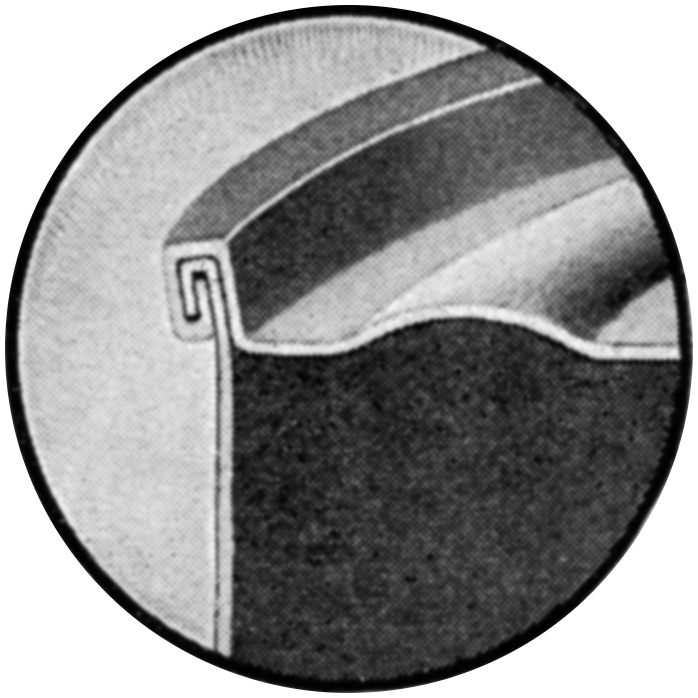
Cutaway illustration of a double seam

A double seam is a canning process for sealing a tin can by mechanically interlocking the can body and a can end (or lid).

Originally, the can end was soldered or welded onto the can body after the can was filled. However, this introduced a variety of issues, such as foreign contaminants (including lead and other harmful heavy metals). The double seam was later developed as a cheaper and safer alternative and quickly replaced the welded seam.

The double seam is made using a double seamer, which can have just one or a number of heads or seaming stations. The double seam is formed by mechanically interlocking five layers of material together: three layers of the can end and two layers of the can body. Each seaming head typically consists of two rolls, a first operation roll and second operation roll, and a chuck. Some seaming machines have two first operation rolls and two second operation rolls and a few machines use a method called "rail seaming" which requires no rolls. During the seaming operation, the can end is lowered on to the filled can body and held down by the chuck, which acts as an anvil to the seaming operation. The first operation roll then engages the can end against the can body thereby folding the end curl around the flange of the body. In some seaming machines, this is done as the can is turning at high speed. In other seaming machines, the can is stationary and the first operation roll (or rolls) spins around several times to ensure a complete first operation. After the first operation is complete, the first operation roll disengages from the can and the second operation roll then engages the can. The purpose of the second operation is to iron out the double seam into its final shape and remove the voids between the layers of can and end material. In practice, ironing out all of the can and end material in a double seam without leaving some voids is impossible without the use of a sealing compound.

== Defects ==
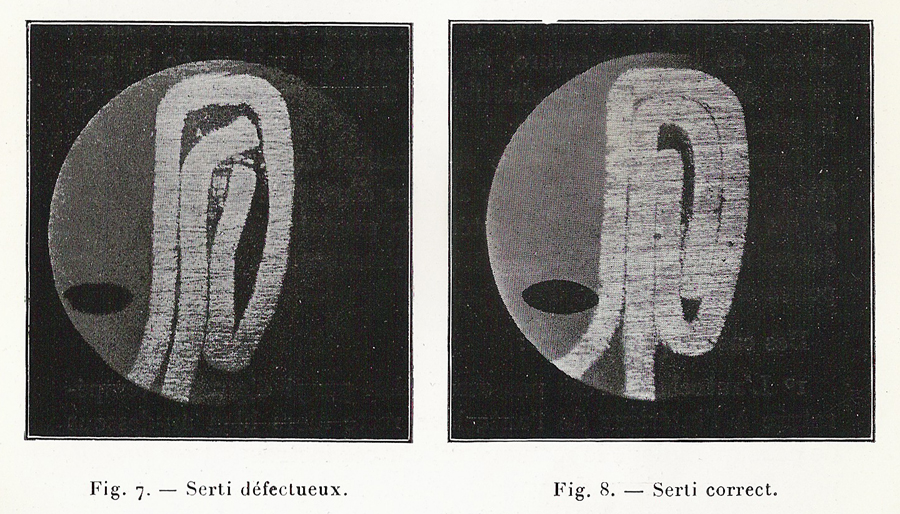
Incorrect (left) and correct (right) seams

The production of a high-quality double seam is dependent on several factors, including conformity to the set can and end specifications, the quality of the seamer tooling used and its compliance with the can and end being used, the condition of the seaming machine and the setup of the seaming rolls, lifter pressure and other components. When the machinery is set up correctly and the incoming materials (cans, ends, tooling, etc.) comply to the set specifications, the result should be ideal first and second operation seams.

A problem in any one of these factors and others can contribute to seam defects that have an adverse effect on the ability of the can to withstand foreign contamination and keep the product from leaking or reduce its shelf life. Below is a list that can be used as a reference.

- Cover droop - A droop is a smooth projection of a double seam below the bottom of a normal seam. The droop may occur at any point of the double seam.
- Cover Vee - "Vees" or "lips" are projections of the double seam below the bottom of a normal seam that resemble a "V" shape. There is usually no overlap of the cover hook with the body hook and these defects usually occur in small areas of the seam.
- Cut Over - A "cut-over" is a seam defect where the top of the inside portion of the seam has become sharp enough to fracture the metal. As in the definition of "sharp seam", this condition usually occurs at the side seam juncture of a three piece container.
- Dead Head - A deadhead or spinner (also referred to as slips or skids) is an incomplete seam caused by the chuck spinning in the countersink during the seaming operation.
- False Seam - A "false seam" is a seam or portion of the seam which is completely unhooked, and in which the folded cover hook is compressed against the folded body hook. A false seam is not always detectable in an external examination.
- Knocked Down Flange - A knocked down flange is a critical seam defect and it occurs when the cover and body hooks do not interlock due to a bent can flange before double seaming.
- Long Body Hook - A long body hook is a condition where the body hook approaches or exceeds the maximum recommended specification.
- Long Cover Hook - A long cover hook is a condition where the cover hook length approaches or exceeds the recommended guidelines.
- Loose First Operation Seam - Loose first operation seams may not allow sufficient tuck up of the cover curl to form a sufficient amount of cover hook and overlap in the finished seam.
- Pleats, Puckers and Spurs - A pleat is a fold in the cover hook that extends from the cut edge downward toward the cover hook radius and sometimes below this radius in a sharp vee or spur shape. A pucker is a condition which is intermediate between a reverse wrinkle and a pleat, where the cover hook at the cut edge is locally distorted downward without actually folding. A spur is a localized irregularity characterized by a sharp protrusion at the bottom of the double seam. It is usually accompanied by a pleat or vee in the cover hook.
- Seam bump - Seam bumps are a relatively short area of the double seam, where the seam thickness suddenly increases by 0.004 in (0.10 mm) or more. They are predominantly found on welded and two-piece cans with long body hooks and are usually seen on the can filler's end when hot filled products exceed 185 degrees (Fahrenheit). The cover hook radius may be pulled away from the body wall.
- Sharp seam - A sharp seam is a condition where the seam has a sharp edge and / or radius on the upper inside edge of the countersink wall. Sharpness is a conditional defect and must be evaluated by degree (slight vs sharp). A slight condition must be carefully watched and corrected as soon as possible. Left unchecked, this defect can cause cut overs.
- Short Body Hook - A short body hook is a condition where the body hook does not meet the minimum required specification.
- Short Cover Hook - A short cover hook is a condition where the cover hook does not meet the minimum recommended specification.
- Sprung seam - A sprung seam is a condition where the seam is pulled away from the body wall. In extreme cases, the seam is pulled away from the body wall all the way around the can.
- Tight First Operation Seam - Tight first operation seams can create flatness at the bottom of the first operation seam throughout its length. The cover hook may also be turned into the body hook. Overly tight first operation seams tend to create more reverse wrinkles in the cover hook.

== Government regulations ==
In the United States, the production and quality of double seams is regulated by the US Department of Health and Human Services - Food and Drug Administration (FDA) and the Department of Agriculture (USDA). The plant's responsibility towards the government depends on the product being canned. The FDA regulates all components of canning low acid canned foods, including handling of empty containers, glass, metal and plastic containers. FDA regulations require that at least one double seam can per seamer must be visually inspected every 30 minutes. Additionally one can per line must be cut open and inspected with a micrometer or a seam scope, which projects a magnified image of the seam, at least every four hours. The USDA regulates canning of animal products. Additionally, X-rays may be used to inspect the seam as part of the visual inspection.
