= Can seamer =

Machine used to seal the lid to the can body

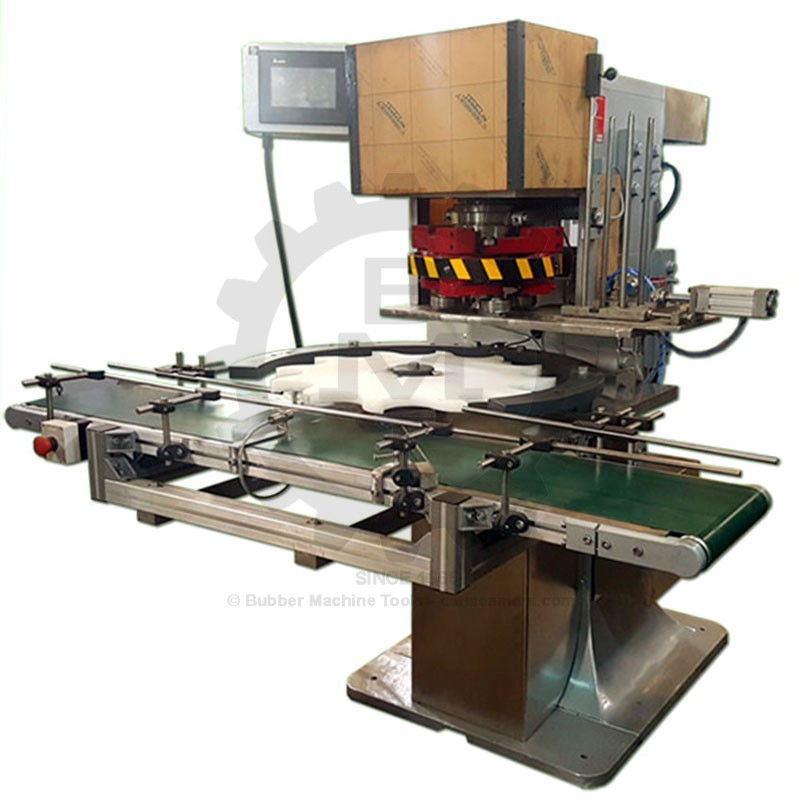
Automatic Can Seamer

A can seamer is a machine used to seal the lid to the can body. The lid or "end" is usually tinplated steel (food) or aluminum (drinks) while the body can be of metal (such as cans for beverages and soups), paperboard (whisky cans) or plastic.

The seam formed is generally leak proof, but this depends on the product being canned. The seam is made by mechanically overlapping the two layers to form a hook.

Different parameters of the hook are measured and monitored to check the integrity of the seam under different conditions.

The shape of the double seam is determined by the shape of the seamer roll profile and the relative position. During the can seaming process, the seamer chuck holds the can while the rolls rotate around it. Initially, the first operation roll folds the lid (end) and then the second operation rolls tightens the resulting seam.

The first operation seam is critical to avoid problems like wrinkles (tightness issues) and leaks. The shape of the seam is determined by the shape of the first operation roll, the second operation roll, their relative positions and distances, lifter height, lifter pressure. Any damage or problems to the seamer or seamer tools can cause severe problems to the double seam like seam bumps, wrinkles, sharp seams, and open seams.

== Can seamer setup ==
Seamer setup is usually done by an experienced individual, typically using a lifter height gauge, lifter height pressure gauge, and feeler gauges (small pieces of metal for go/no go testing of the distances between the roll and chuck toolings). New products like the clearance gauge are able to let even novice users adjust seamers and optimize them, as well as locate problems with broken/damaged tooling, shank/bushing issues, seamer adjustment issues, or broken bearings.

== Applications ==
Some common can seamer applications include, but are not limited to:

- Cans
- Automotive filters (oil and fuel)
- Capacitors
- Certain automotive mufflers (silencers)
- Drums
