= Oddicombe Beach =

Beach in Devon, England

Coordinates: 50.482°N 3.513°W

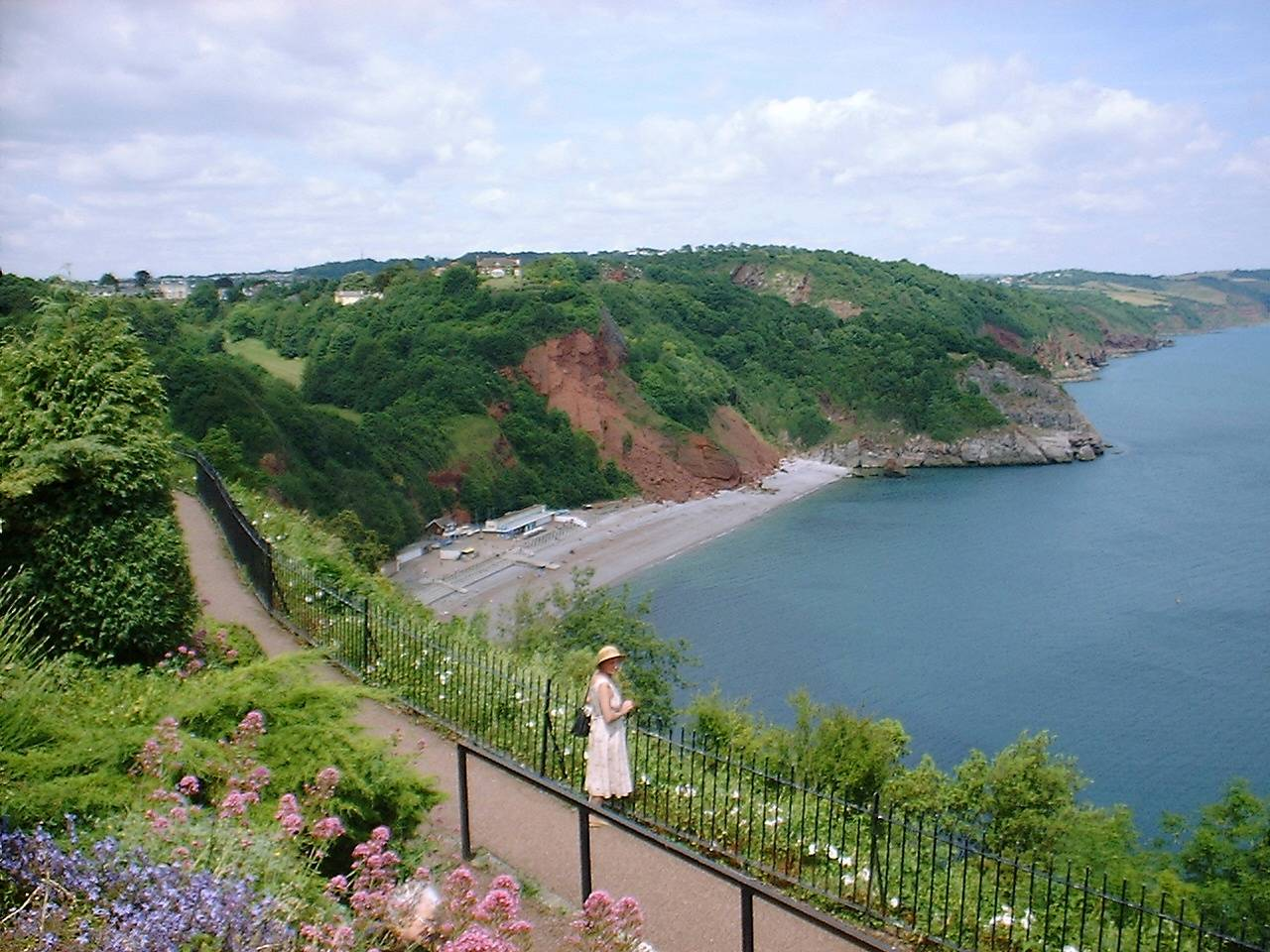
Oddicombe Beach from Babbacombe Downs

Oddicombe Beach is a popular beach, noted for its interesting breccia cliffs, below the Babbacombe district of Torbay, Devon in England. The beach is linked to Babbacombe town by the Babbacombe Cliff Railway.

The beach includes many facilities which include a cafe, beach hut and deck chair hire, a beach shop, trampolines, motor boat hire, pedalo hire and kayak hire. Oddicombe beach has been awarded Blue Flag status every year since the award was first made in 1987. It is one of only two in England to have been awarded the flag every year.

== See also ==
- Babbacombe Cliff Railway
