= OYL Industries =

OYL Industries Berhad
- Company type: Private
- Defunct: 2006
- Successor: OYL Manufacturing Company Sdn Bhd
- Headquarters: 10/F, Wisma Hong Leong, 18, Jalan Perak, 50450 Kuala Lumpur, Malaysia

OYL Industries Berhad (OYL Industries Limited) was a member of the Hong Leong Group Malaysia, until its 2006 acquisition by Japan's Daikin Industries. OYL was one of the largest air conditioner manufacturers, and post merger, made Daikin the number two manufacturer of air conditioning systems in the world.

== History ==
In the 1980s, OYL expanded regionally into China and Indonesia. Having set a firm foundation regionally, OYL took a significant step towards the globalisation of its activities when it acquired US-based SnyderGeneral in May 1994. This acquisition of a major US company by a Malaysian public listed organisation is the first in Malaysian corporate history.

The Group's principal activities are the manufacture, sale and distribution of heating, ventilating, air-conditioning and refrigeration equipment and the manufacture and sale of air filtration products and systems. Other activities include investment and property holding. Operations are carried out in North America, Asia and Europe.

OYL was incorporated in Malaysia as a private limited company under the name of O.YL. Industries Sdn Bhd and commenced operations (in Shah Alam) during the year 1974 with the assembly of gas cookers and GLEM gas ovens.

OYL was a public listed company and its shares were traded on the Main Board of Bursa Malaysia. It was delisted as OYL became a member of Hong Leong Group Malaysia.

In 2006, Daikin acquired OYL from Hong Leong.
