= Peter Durand =

English merchant (1766–1822)

Peter Durand (21 October 1766 – 23 July 1822) was an English merchant who is widely credited with receiving the first patent for the idea of preserving food using tin cans. The patent (No 3372) was granted on August 25, 1810 by George III.

The patent specifies that it was issued to Peter Durand, a merchant of Hoxton Square, Middlesex, United Kingdom, for a method of preserving food (from vegetable or animal sources) and other perishable articles using various vessels made of glass, pottery, tin or other suitable metals. The preservation procedure was to fill up a vessel with food and cap it. Vegetables were to be put in raw, whereas animal substances might either be raw or half-cooked. Then the whole item was to be heated by any means, such as an oven, stove or a steam bath, but most conveniently by immersing in water and boiling it. The boiling time was not specified, and was said to depend on the food and vessel size. Neither was the patent clear on the length of time the food could be kept after canning, which was merely said to be "long". The cap was to be partly open during the whole heating and cooling procedure, but right after that, the vessel should be sealed airtight by any means, such as a cork plug, a screw-cap with a rubber seal, cementing, etc.

In his patent, Durand clearly mentions that the idea of the invention was communicated to him more than a year ago by a friend abroad. Extensive research in 19th century archives has revealed that the friend was French inventor Philippe de Girard. The relation between Durand and Girard has not been advertised, and the credit for the first canned food patent remains with Durand.

The patent itself consists of two distinct parts: first, the description of the original idea, and second, observations by Durand himself. Durand was clearly suspicious of the invention. However, having a curious mind, he performed a thorough test of it by himself, sealing meat, soups and milk, and boiling them as described. The original inventor had only experimented with small food volumes, whereas Durand envisioned future large scale production and therefore preserved up to 30 lb (13.6 kg) of meat in one can. For unknown reasons, Durand used only tin cans rather than glass vessels. He arranged for the cans to sail with the Royal Navy for a period of four to six months. Several members of the Royal Society and the Royal Institution examined the food upon its arrival, and found that it was perfectly preserved.

Durand's patent was dedicated to the preservation technique rather than to the vessel. The technique itself was developed previously by a Frenchman, Nicolas Appert. However, Appert used exclusively glass vessels whereas Durand was the first to mention in a patent use of tin cans.

After receiving the patent, Durand did not pursue the business of canning food. He sold his patent in 1812 to two other Englishmen, Bryan Donkin and John Hall, for £1,000. Donkin had been involved with tinning of iron from 1808 and was keen to expand the use of his metal products to the food industry. Donkin and Hall set up a commercial canning factory and by 1813 were producing their first canned goods for the British army. In 1818, Durand introduced food in tin cans to the United States by re-patenting his British patent in the US. By 1820, canned food was a recognized article in Britain and France and by 1822 in the United States.
