= Bob Hicks (activist) =

Prominent leader in Bogalusa, Louisiana

- Born: Robert Hicks; February 20, 1929; Pachuta, Mississippi
- Died: April 13, 2010 (aged 81); Bogalusa, Louisiana
- Occupation: African-American activist
- Spouse: Valeira Payton Hicks
- Children: 10

Robert Hicks (February 20, 1929 – April 13, 2010) was a prominent leader in Bogalusa, Louisiana during the Civil Rights Movement, whose activism helped put an end to segregation and discriminatory practices in education, housing, employment, public accommodations and healthcare. Best known for his leading role in founding the Bogalusa chapter of The Deacons for Defense and Justice, an armed African-American self-defense group, Hicks led daily protests on the streets of Jim Crow-era Bogalusa. He served as president and later Vice President of the Bogalusa Civic and Voters League, and the plaintiff in a series of civil rights lawsuits which achieved groundbreaking legal victories nationwide.

== Early life and family ==
Robert Hicks was born on February 20, 1929, in Pachuta, Mississippi, the youngest child of Quitman and Maybell Crawford Hicks. He moved to Bogalusa, Louisiana, with his family when he was a young child. In 1947, he graduated from the segregated Central Memorial High School, where he played both offensive guard and defensive end on the State Championship football team. He later played offensive guard for The Bushmen, an all-Black semi-pro team.

After high school, he married Valeira Payton of Bogalusa, who fully supported the struggle for African-American civil rights. After being denied admission to the Bogalusa Vocational Tech College, she traveled to New Orleans every day to earn her degree as a Licensed Practical Nurse. They raised seven children. He also had three additional children outside of his marriage.

Hicks began his working life in construction and was eventually hired as a shop steward at Bogalusa's leading industry, the Crown Zellerbach paper mill, at a time when few blacks were employed there. He became an outspoken union organizer, serving as president of the segregated International Brotherhood of Pulp, Sulphite, and Paper Mill Workers. Hicks' trade union experience and the deep ties forged between union brothers would soon provide the Bogalusa Civil Rights Movement with a powerful organizational foundation.

=== Beginnings of civil rights activism ===
Robert Hicks was an active member of the Bogalusa chapter of the NAACP. After a Louisiana Circuit Court judge outlawed the NAACP throughout the state, Hicks joined the Bogalusa Civic and Voters League (BCVL), one of several local voting rights organizations formed in response to the state ban. In 1965, the Congress of Racial Equality (CORE) assigned two civil rights workers, William "Bill" Yates, a former Cornell professor, and Steve Miller, an Antioch College student, to Bogalusa to help organize "testing" and protests to desegregate local public accommodations. Aware that the white activists' lives would have been at risk had they stayed in any nearby hotel, Robert and Valeira Hicks courageously volunteered to let Yates and Miller stay at their home. It would be the first time any white person had ever spent the night in the "colored quarters" of Bogalusa.

On the evening of February 1, 1965, Robert Hicks and his family had just sat down for dinner with their guests when there was a knock at the door. Bogalusa Chief of Police Claxton Knight and Deputy Sheriff Doyle Holliday had come to inform Hicks that a mob of two hundred white men had gathered, prepared to murder the entire family and burn the house to the ground if he didn't put the white activists out, adding that they should expect no help from law enforcement: "We have better things to do than protect people who aren't wanted here."

Robert Hicks had a terrible choice to make. His decision would go on to alter the shape of the civil rights movement in America. He did not hesitate. When Yates asked if they could stay, he simply replied, "Hell yeah." He later recalled, "We just knew that if [they] left our house, we would never see them alive again." The Hicks family, including the children, went into action, phoning black men all over Bogalusa—friends, fellow mill workers, church brethren—asking them to come to the house as fast as possible with loaded guns. Meanwhile, Yates & Miller called CORE who alerted the Department of Justice, the FBI, and the Louisiana governor's office. Once the calls were made, the children were hidden in the back of a getaway car and driven to a safe house. Within minutes, black men with shotguns began arriving from all directions. The two law enforcement officers, who had remained parked outside, stared in disbelief and drove off. The angry mob never appeared.

The events of that night marked the beginning of the Bogalusa civil rights movement, a movement that was unique at the time because it broke from the principles of non-violence espoused by Martin Luther King and other civil rights leaders, and instead asserted the right to armed self-defense against white aggression. In an interview, Hicks explained: "Since we can't get the local officials to protect us in our community, our neighborhood, let's back up on the Constitution of the United States and say that we can bear arms. We have a right to defend ourselves since the legally designated authorities won't do it."

=== Deacons for Defense and Justice ===
On February 21, 1965, Robert Hicks and fellow activists Bert Wyre, Fletcher Anderson, Charles Sims and others founded the Bogalusa chapter of the Deacons for Defense and Justice, headquartered in Robert Hicks' home and made up of many of the same men who had come forward with their guns to protect the family on February 1. The Deacons had been founded in 1964 in the mill town of Jonesboro, Louisiana as an armed self-defense organization of black men to protect local citizens and civil rights workers against the KKK and other white vigilantes. The organization went on to establish 21 chapters in Louisiana, Alabama, and Mississippi, but the Bogalusa chapter attracted the most national recognition for its militancy and repeated clashes with the Ku Klux Klan and local law enforcement.

The Deacons were headquartered in Robert Hicks' modest home, with the family breakfast room converted into a radio communications and command base. Radios were a necessity because the city not only monitored Hicks' calls, but also periodically shut off his phone lines. Whenever a call for help came in, whoever was manning the radio would send out an encrypted alert and the Deacons would assemble to protect and defend.

The Hicks house also became the meeting place for the executive board members of the Bogalusa Civic and Voters League, as well as local headquarters to organizations such as CORE and SNCC, the black-owned civil rights law firm of Collins, Douglas and Elie, and Richard Sobol of the Lawyers Constitutional Defense Committee. The attorneys commandeered the living room to prepare several groundbreaking lawsuits that set precedents nationwide. All the while, the Hicks family continued to offer their home as a safe haven for civil rights workers and citizens under threat from the KKK, and as a medical triage station for injured activists denied service at Bogalusa's federally funded state hospital.

On May 19, 1965, a day that became known as "Bloody Wednesday," Robert Hicks and fellow Deacon Sam Barnes notified local law enforcement and the FBI that they planned to lead a group of African-American citizens, including children, to the white-only Cassidy Park, the largest public park in Bogalusa. Soon after they arrived, a white mob approached accompanied by local police and began indiscriminately attacking the black adults and children with clubs and leather belts. Robert Hicks' 15-year-old son Gregory was bitten in the leg by a police K9 dog and a 75-year-old woman was knocked unconscious. Both were refused treatment at the Bogalusa Community Medical Center. Four days later, their sacrifice led to a major victory as the Mayor of Bogalusa signed a six-point desegregation agreement with the Bogalusa Civic and Voters League.

Another key achievement was the 105-mile, 10-day March from Bogalusa to Baton Rouge that began on August 10, 1967, and lasted ten days, with the Deacons providing protection. Despite being attacked in the Livingston Parish town of Satsuma and learning that the bridge over the Amite River was wired with explosives, the marchers made it to the steps of the Capitol in Baton Rouge. When the Deacons were originally formed, Martin Luther King had initially publicly disavowed the organization for its break with his philosophy of non-violence. But by 1966, he reluctantly acknowledged their usefulness and allowed the Deacons to provide security for the March against Fear from Memphis, Tennessee to Jackson, Mississippi.

== Legal battles for civil rights ==
=== Hicks v. Knight ===
On June 25, 1965, CORE attorneys filed Hicks v. Knight against Bogalusa Chief of Police Claxton Knight. The suit argued that police "must protect black demonstrators instead of harassing them, beating them, arresting them and leaving them at the mercy of white mobs." The brutal events at Cassidy Park, especially the canine attack on Hicks' teenage son Gregory were presented as key evidence. On July 10, Judge Herbert Christenberry issued an injunction ordering law enforcement to protect protesters from "physical assaults and beatings" and to cease "preventing or discouraging the exercise of their rights to picket, assemble peaceably, and advocate equal civil rights for Negroes."

=== United States v. Original Knights of the Ku Klux Klan ===
On December 1, 1965, US Attorney General Nicholas Katzenbach filed United States v. Original Knights of the Ku Klux Klan asking for an injunction barring Klan members from interfering with the civil rights of black citizens of Washington Parish. The suit noted that "an unusual feature of this litigation is the defendants' damning admissions. The defendants admit that the Klan's objective is to prevent Washington Parish Negroes from exercising the civil rights Congress recognized by statute." The case findings cited the Klan's continued harassment of Bogalusa black citizens, in direct violation of the Hicks v. Knight ruling.

=== Hicks v. Crown Zellerbach ===
In 1966, Robert Hicks filed Hicks v. Crown Zellerbach, the first class action lawsuit under Title VII of the 1964 Civil Rights Act which prohibits employment discrimination based on race, color, religion, sex and national origin. The suit challenged racial discrimination in hiring and promotions at the local paper mill, owned by the Crown Zellerbach Corporation. The US District Court issued a sweeping order that served as a model for similar orders obtained in other cases in Louisiana and throughout the country, opening doors for black women who had never worked at the mill before, and providing black workers with access to managerial positions. After filing the suit, Hicks became the first black worker in the plant to be promoted to a supervisor position, a job he held until his retirement.

=== Hicks v. Weaver ===
On September 10, 1969, Hicks filed Robert Hicks and Leon E. Rayford v. Robert C. Weaver in his capacity as Secretary of the United States Department of Housing and Urban Development. The goal of this lawsuit against the US Department of Housing and Urban Development was to prevent the construction of more federally assisted, low-rent public housing in Bogalusa on the grounds that such construction perpetuated segregation. Hicks won the case and the proposed housing development was stopped.

=== Jenkins v. City of Bogalusa School Board ===
In 1965, Gayle Jenkins, Robert Hicks and other plaintiffs filed Jenkins v. City of Bogalusa School Board on behalf of their school-age children. Despite the 1954 ruling in Brown v. Board of Education, the school system in Bogalusa had remained entirely segregated, with separate elementary and high schools for black and white students. The US Court of Appeals Fifth Circuit ruling stated that "effective immediately," school districts could no longer operate a dual school system based on race or color.

== Legacy and honors ==
On August 28, 2010, four months after Robert Hicks' death from cancer, East 9th Street in Bogalusa was officially renamed Robert "BOB" Hicks Street. Citizens, elected officials, and civil rights advocates gathered for the dedication ceremony to honor his life.

On August 4, 2010, United States Senator from Louisiana Mary Landrieu stood on the Senate floor and spoke to the nation to recognize the legacy of Robert Hicks: "I come to the Senate floor today to reflect upon the passing of Robert Hicks, a lion in the Louisiana civil rights movement whose legal victories helped topple segregation in Bogalusa and change discriminatory employment practices throughout the South." On June 14, 2014, Robert Hicks was honored with a Civil Rights and Social Justice Award from the National Civil Rights Conference during the 50th Anniversary Commemorative Service for James Chaney, Andrew Goodman, and Michael Schwerner in Philadelphia, Mississippi.

On August 26, 2014, the first official Louisiana Historical Land Marker for an African American in Washington Parish was placed in honor of Robert Hicks in front of his former family home at 924 East Robert "BOB" Hicks Street. (For the text of the marker, see Robert "Bob" Hicks House.) The US Senator for Louisiana David Vitter acknowledged the legacy of Robert Hicks as a "civil rights hero" and the importance of the Hicks House in a statement for the US Congressional Record. On January 20, 2015, the Robert "Bob" Hicks House was listed on the National Register of Historic Places. It was deemed significant for its role in the Bogalusa Civil Rights Movement and for its association with leader Robert Hicks. It was the first African-American history site in Washington Parish to be included on the National Register.

On November 7, 2015, fifty years after "Bloody Wednesday" when black men, women and children were brutally attacked by white citizens and police officers in Bogalusa's segregated Cassidy Park, a group of city officials, citizens and religious leaders offered a public apology to black residents for the city's racist past.

== In popular culture ==
The 2003 television movie Deacons for Defense chronicles the history of the Bogalusa Deacons for Defense. Forest Whitaker stars in a role inspired by the combined stories of Robert Hicks and fellow Deacons, A.Z. Young and Charlie Sims.

In 2016, Robert Hicks' story was featured on the Gimlet podcast "Undone," hosted by Eric Eddings. The episode, titled "The Deacons," also focuses on the opposition Hicks' daughter Barbara Hicks Collins has encountered in her work to start a civil rights museum in her father's name.

A shotgun used by the Deacons for Defense to protect the Hicks family and civil rights activists was donated to the permanent collection of the National Museum of African American History and Culture.
