= Robert "Bob" Hicks House =

Historic house in Louisiana, United States

- U.S. National Register of Historic Places
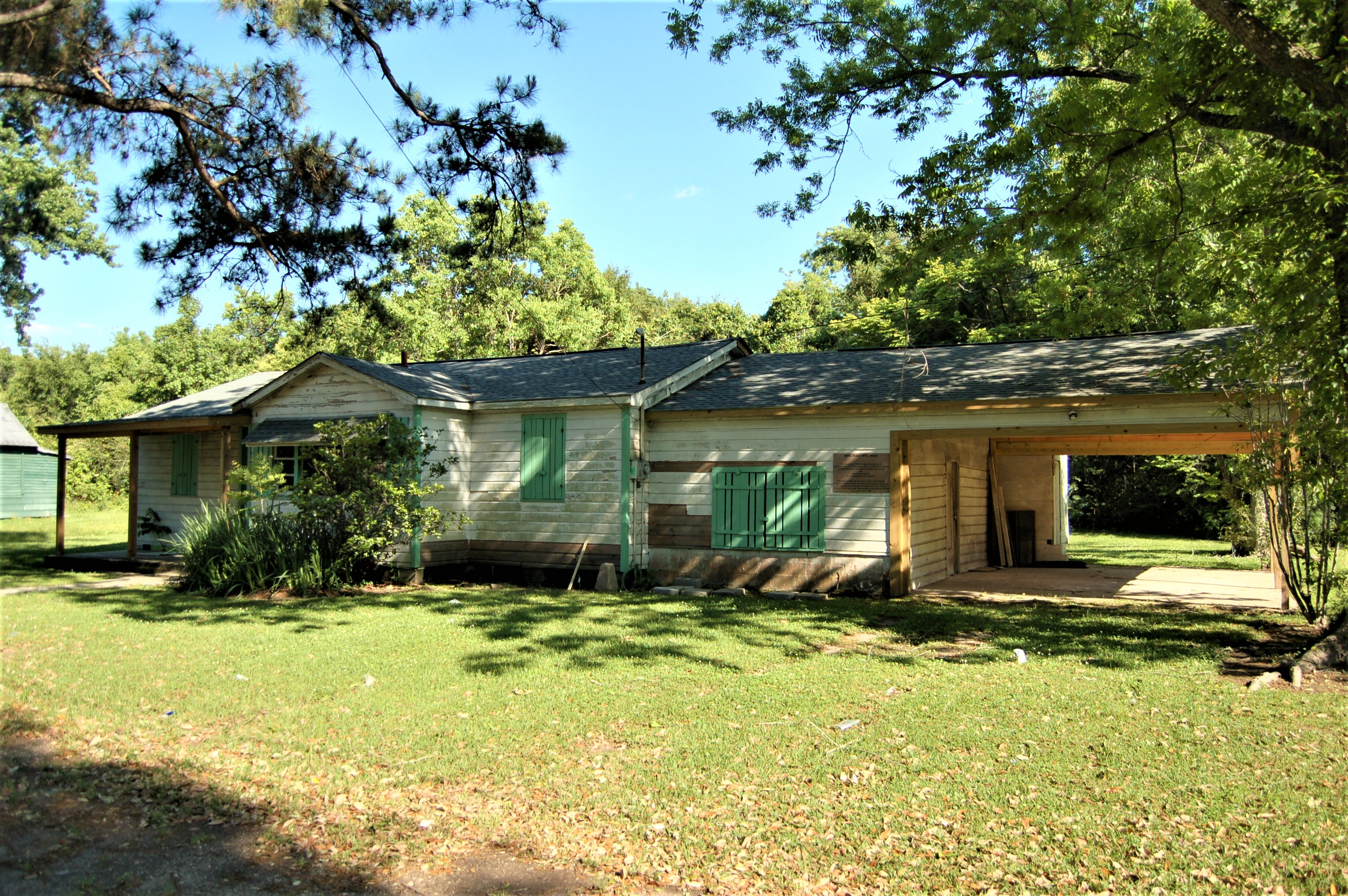

- Location within Louisiana Location within the United States
- Location: 924 E. Robert "Bob" Hicks (formerly 9th) St., Bogalusa, Louisiana
- Coordinates: 30°46′15″N 89°50′48″W
- NRHP reference No.: 14001174
- Added to NRHP: January 20, 2015

The Robert Hicks House, in Bogalusa, Louisiana, was the home from 1965 to 1969 of civil rights leader Bob Hicks (1929–2010) and the site of civil rights meetings in the city. The house, built in the early 1950s, is a one-story 1,590 sq ft (148 m^{2}) building with similarities to 1950s ranch houses and 1930s bungalows. It has weatherboard siding and is built on concrete piers.

The property also includes a 1906-built "mill house" built by the Great Southern Lumber Company when it developed the company town of Bogalusa from the ground up in 1906–1907.

== History ==
Hicks was a co-founder and leader of the local chapter of the Deacons for Defense and Justice, founded in February 1965 and affiliated with the original group founded in Jonesboro, Louisiana. They organized men for armed self-defense in order to protect civil rights activists and their families, under attack in those years by the Ku Klux Klan. He was also a leader of the Bogalusa Civic and Voters League (BCVL), which was seeking to register black voters.

The house was listed on the National Register of Historic Places in 2015. It was deemed significant for its role in the Civil Rights Movement in Bogalusa and for its association with leader Robert Hicks. The house served as the headquarters for the executive board of the BCVL, and for the Deacons for Defense and Justice.

On February 1, 1965, the house was threatened with bombing by whites seeking to intimidate the activists of the BCVL. On February 21, 1965, Hicks and others founded the local chapter of the Deacons for Defense and Justice to protect activists and their families.

On May 17, 1965, Hicks participated in an attempt by blacks to use one of Bogalusa's public parks. Despite passage the previous year of the national Civil Rights Act of 1964, prohibiting segregation of public facilities, local whites continued to exclude blacks from parks and other places. Confrontations continued through the summer and in July 1965, the federal government used Reconstruction-era law to order the local police to protect the civil rights activists.

A historic plaque was erected at the house site. The Robert Hicks Foundation is supporting work for a civil rights museum at the site.

== Text of the marker ==
Front:

Robert “Bob” Hicks
(Feb 20, 1929 - Apr 13, 2010)

Fueled by discriminatory practices & violent intimidation that permeated his community, threatened his family & friends, Mr. Hicks developed an unquenchable thirst for justice & equality. He "sparked the spirits" of people & communities. His involvement in planning rallies, marches, daily demonstrations, boycotts, organizing armed protection for targets of racially & politically motivated violence, & initiating successful legal challenges helped topple segregation ending "separate but unequal" practices in education, employment, law, government, voting rights, healthcare & housing. As an NAACP member, Treasurer of Prince Hall Masons, President of Bogalusa Chapter of Deacons for Defense and Justice, Pres. of Crown Zellerbach's segregated Union (International Brotherhood of Pulp, Sulphite, and Paper Mill Workers), and first African American supervisor in the mill's box plant, Hicks remained a staunch advocate for justice for all Americans and was an ordinary man with the courage to do extraordinary things.

Reverse:

Robert "Bob" Hicks Street

On Feb. 1, 1965, learning of a Ku Klux Klan plan to bomb his home, Robert Hicks & his family were told by police that they could not protect them. The Klan was furious that Hicks was housing 2 white civil rights workers and demanded they leave that night. Aware of the danger, Hicks said 'no' to the demand. Hicks & his wife called friends to take their 5 children to a safe place & asked for protection. Armed black men stood guard during the night. On Feb 21, the Jonesboro Deacons for Defense & Justice visited Bogalusa to start a chapter citing the 2nd Amendment and carrying guns with the mission of protection against white aggression. Hicks took the lead starting a Bogalusa chapter. Deacons' confrontation with the Klan created history, started a Civil Rights Movement, empowering a people, & propelled the U.S. Government to enforce The 1964 Civil Rights Act to neutralize the Klan. The Hicks' home was the birth & meeting place for Deacons, foot soldiers, lawyers, civil & human rights advocates, and a safe haven for all. Decisions made in this home significantly impacted the future of the community, Louisiana & the nation. Hicks showed courage in defense of justice and equality.

== See also ==
- Deacons for Defense (film)
- National Register of Historic Places listings in Washington Parish, Louisiana
