= Association of Western Pulp and Paper Workers =

American trade union

The Association of Western Pulp and Paper Workers (AWPPW) is a labor union in the western United States that was affiliated with the United Brotherhood of Carpenters and Joiners of America. The Association of Western Pulp and Paper Workers disaffiliated from the Carpenters in 2023. It was established 62 years ago in September 1964, when West Coast rank-and-file members of the International Brotherhood of Pulp, Sulphite, and Paper Mill Workers became dissatisfied with the conduct of wage negotiations by international vice-presidents and those of another international union, the United Papermakers and Paperworkers, with whom a Uniform Labor Agreement had been negotiated. The dissatisfaction was a result of the international Vice Presidents announcing that they were taking over the United Labor Association bargaining session. They established a new union, the Association of Western Pulp and Paper Mill Workers. Litigation followed, a NLRB election was conducted in October 1964, and the Western organization was certified as the Uniform Labor Agreement bargaining agent. In 1994, it affiliated with the United Brotherhood of Carpenters and Joiners of America.

== The split ==
On April 23, 1964, a majority of 21,000 workers from forty-nine paper mills, owned by eighteen companies, rebelled against the two oldest established unions that had been representing them. The International Brotherhood of Pulp, Sulphite, and Paper Mill Workers (IBPS&PMW) and the United Papermakers and Paperworkers (UPP), along with affiliate Pacific Coast Pulp and Paper Mill Employees Association (PCPPMEA), bargained collectively with twenty-nine manufacturers.

The PCPPMEA had always negotiated with a certain amount of autonomy. Various issues had arisen over the years that created dissension. Significantly, it was the matter of secrecy and lack of democratic rule that was most chafing. The International unions elected their VPs by a majority of votes cast at the convention. Even 100% of the PCPPMEA delegates were not enough to choose their own representation. Rank and file members of the PCPPMEA didn't believe the Internationals were giving sufficient effort to settle their grievances.

During pre-wage negotiations the Internationals were seen to have thrown out thirty years of negotiating practice when they replaced PCPPMEA delegates with International VPs. It was this act that prompted Bill Perrin, acknowledged leader of the PCPPMEA, to walk out. He said he just planned "to go do a little fishing." He was astonished to find that he had been followed by seventy-three of the 138 delegates.

The two International unions appointed replacement delegates and continued to negotiate without the PCPPMEA. Pacific Coast delegates were denied admittance when they attempted to return. Legal action before the Oregon Circuit Court sought to reinstate Pacific Coast delegates. The court ruled against the PCPPMEA and a peace committee was proposed but not well received by any of the parties. An attorney for the International unions argued before the court that NLRB action, rather than a court hearing, was the appropriate venue to decide the issue. It was this statement that sparked the idea to establish a new union.

On May 9, 1964, several leaders of the rebellion met in Olympia, Washington, to form the AWPPW. Bargaining between the International unions and the companies had concluded on May 5. They had received an offer of about $0.16¾ an hour. This represented the best offer labor had ever received. The fledgling union was faced with two tasks simultaneously: it had to convince the membership to reject this offer and get enough cards signed to demand NLRB recognition. 9,500 northwest pulp and paper workers, well above the 30% necessary, signed cards requesting representation by the AWPPW. The contract was rejected and nearly 15,000 members had refused to vote. These vote totals represented a serious embarrassment and threat to the International unions.

The International unions moved quickly to issue a second referendum offering members an opportunity to reconsider the offer. They asked Pacific Coast mill owners to implement the contract. The employers refused, citing the pending NLRB ruling on the representation petition by the AWPPW. On July 12, the NLRB's Regional Director granted the AWPPW request for a bargaining rights election. The election was held during the week of September 14 and forty-nine mills gave the AWPPW a victory over the Internationals 10,653 to 8,130. The AWPPW was certified as the exclusive bargaining agent for Pacific Coast pulp and paper workers on October 1, 1964.

== The first contract ==
The first order of business for the new union was to negotiate a contract with the manufacturers' association. The untested, inexperienced AWPPW faced an array of forces. They were unsure how vigorously their membership would back them. Taking the membership out on a strike would not be the most auspicious beginning. President William Burnell of the IBPS&PMW and President Paul L. Phillips of the UPP issued a joint statement declaring the intention of their unions to fight to regain bargaining rights for all the mills they had lost. George Meany of the AFL–CIO denounced the AWPPW and gave his support to the Internationals.

However, the new union had support as well. The national AFL–CIO may not have supported them but the Oregon State AFL–CIO named Bill Perrin, President of the AWPPW, Oregon Labor Leader of the Year. The AWPPW received support and pledges of financial assistance from the International Longshore and Warehouse Union, the Teamsters, the International Woodworkers of America, and the Lumber and Sawmill Workers.

On October 25, 1964, the AWPPW engaged in its first pre-wage conference. They elected a bargaining board, established procedures, and drafted the demands they would present at the joint wage conference. Present were 140 delegates from fifty-eight locals in Washington, Oregon, and California. It was important to bring back a contract competitive with those signed by the International unions. The AWPPW felt it was important to settle a contract quickly.

Negotiations began on October 28, 1964. They followed procedures that had been established in the past. The first critical issue to be negotiated was language stipulating that all employees would be represented by the AWPPW. The manufacturers' association resisted this demand. The bargain reached an impasse on the very first issue. On November 3, the management called for the Federal Mediation and Conciliation Service (FMCS).

On November 11, the AWPPW called for the first strike Pacific coast mills had seen in thirty years. Some employees who remained loyal to the old International unions crossed the picket lines. Employers claimed that thirty-three of the mills continued to operate. Emotions ran high and there was some violence. Contempt of court proceedings were started. Restraining orders were issued and charges of unfair labor practices were lodged. The FMCS in Washington D.C. monitored continued negotiations. With their aid, an agreement was reached on November 23 and the strike came to an end.

== The Constitution ==
February, 1965 saw the first constitutional convention of the AWPPW. The primary constitutional consideration was democratic rule. History of democracy in unions made it clear that a certain amount of authority needed to be vested in the AWPPW to make decisions in the best interest of the membership. The balance fashioned into the Constitution presented concerns to both rank and file and officers of the AWPPW.

The balance that was struck provided that all representatives and officers had to stand for election. Officers would be permitted to attend and give voice at committee meetings but only the elected regional representatives were allowed to vote. Addressing the issue of equal voice for small locals, it was decided that locals would be provided elected representation that balanced all locals. Thus, smaller unions would be granted more delegates to be given equal voice.

Bill Perrin, who had led the original rebellion, became the first constitutionally elected president of the AWPPW.

Regional representatives had to be re-elected by the membership of their region. The Constitution provided for recall of any elected official. Each region elected a trustee plus one trustee at large whose job it was to monitor the Secretary-Treasurers reports and to make certain that the elected officials were fulfilling their obligations.

A ten-person executive board, consisting of the trustees, the president, two vice presidents and the secretary-treasurer, was formed. Rank-and-file members comprised a majority of the board, so they were able to control board action. They acted as a trial and appeals board. They oversaw charges brought against members under rules of the constitution. Therefore, a member charged with an infraction could appeal to a board that was made of by a majority of rank and file members. This was a distinctly democratic feature of the AWPPW. A member had one more step beyond this board. The decision of the executive board could be appealed to a three-member board called the Public Review Board. It was composed of people not associated with the AWPPW. The Public Review Board had the power to reverse, modify or uphold executive board decisions.

The AWPPW created another distinctly unique, democratic constitutional regulation concerning dues. A modest $2 a month per capita was charged to each local to maintain the management of the union and pay legal bills incurred by the union. If the local, for any reason lost its charter, even by voluntary resignation, all funds and properties would remain with the local. This represented a significant difference from the 'reverter' clauses by which the international unions punished locals if they considered withdrawing. The AWPPW viewed these reverter clauses as blackmail.

Numerous problems faced the new union. The authors of The Pulp and Paper Rebellion: A New Pacific Coast Union offer the opinion that there is little doubt that the AWPPW will continue to operate in a democratic manner. The major concern facing the AWPPW is that it might be too democratic.

== The AWPPW and politics ==
The AWPPW has two primary political interests: preserving jobs, and protecting both current and retired workers. Key issues recently have been environmental measures, international trade agreements, and the Employee Free Choice Act. In the 2008 presidential election, the union wholeheartedly endorsed Barack Obama for his stance on labor issues ranging from minimum wage to the Central American Trade Agreement.

In the early 1970s the AWPPW fought for—and won—improved safety codes for the pulp and paper industry in Washington and Oregon, but was not so successful in trying to enact log export bans.

== Archives ==
- Association of Western Pulp and Paper Workers Records, circa 1960-1970. 14 cubic feet. At the Labor Archives of Washington, University of Washington Libraries Special Collections.
- John H. Eyer Papers. 1930-1986. 19.21 cubic feet (20 boxes).
