= Alessandro Portelli =

Italian scholar of American literature

Alessandro Portelli (born July 8, 1942) is an Italian scholar of American literature and culture, oral historian, writer for the daily newspaper il manifesto, and musicologist. He is a professor of Anglo-American literature at the University of Rome La Sapienza. In the United States he is best known for his oral history work, which has compared workers' accounts of industrial conflicts in Harlan County, Kentucky, and Terni, Italy. In 2014–15, he was a visiting professor in the Department of Sociology at Princeton University, co-teaching a course on Bruce Springsteen's America.

== Early life and education ==
Portelli was born in Rome, Italy, in 1942, and was raised in Terni, an industrial town 65 miles to the north. His father was a civil servant, and his mother was a teacher of English. He spent his senior year of high school as an American Field Service exchange student in the Los Angeles area. He studied at the University of Rome La Sapienza, receiving degrees in law in 1966 and in English in 1972. He began working for the Italian National Research Council in 1962.

== Academic career ==
Portelli began his academic career at the University of Siena, where he taught American literature from 1974 to 1981. He moved to the faculty of human sciences at the University of Rome La Sapienza to teach American literature in 1981 and has remained there to the present.

A meeting between Portelli and University of Kentucky (UK) sociologist David Walls, facilitated by journalist Beniamino Placido, during a visit by Walls to Rome, Italy in summer 1973 led to them visiting Harlan County together during a trip by Portelli to the United States that fall. Portelli returned as a James Still fellow at the UK Appalachian Center in fall 1983, and began developing his extensive oral history work in Harlan County. He also began a continuing exchange program, involving graduate students and faculty, between the UK Appalachian Center and the University of Rome La Sapienza.

Portelli's writing has shifted the focus of oral history from whether the subject's account is historically accurate to the meaning of the story and the nature of memory. Mary Marshall Clark of Columbia University summarizes its significance: "Portelli's work has transformed oral history from being a kind of stepchild of history into a literary genre in its own right. He has allowed us to see oral histories as more than eyewitness accounts that are either true or false and to look for themes and structures of the stories."

Asked to describe his biggest contribution to oral history, Portelli stated, "I brought a literary approach to narrative ... I was interested in narratives that were not factually true because it's one of the ways through which you can get at the meaning and the subjectivity as well as the facts of what actually happened." Portelli's 1991 book based on his oral histories, The Death of Luigi Trastulli, interpreted the meaning of the differing press and oral accounts of the killing of a protesting union member.

Portelli's 1999 book, L'ordine è stato eseguito [The Order Has Been Carried Out], on the 1944 Fosse Ardeatine massacre by Nazis in Rome, "destroy[ed] the dangerously successful story—carefully created by the Germans and their Italian fascist supporters—that the massacre was the fault of the partisans", and has become a classic in Italy, winning the prestigious Viareggio Prize as well as an Oral History Association award.

They Say in Harlan County, in which Portelli tells the story of the coal mining community of Harlan County, Kentucky, between 1964 and 2009, won the W. D. Weatherford Award of the Appalachian Studies Association for the best nonfiction book on Appalachia published in 2010.

In the fall of 2013, Portelli became embroiled in the Boycott, Divestment and Sanctions campaign against Israel's occupation of Palestine after accepting an invitation to an international oral history conference organized by the Hebrew University of Jerusalem.

== Public intellectual ==
In 1972 Portelli founded the Circolo Gianni Bosio, an activist collective dedicated to studying folklore, oral history, and people's culture. He chaired the group, which continued for twenty years, through 1992. Based in Rome, the collective published a journal, I Giorni Cantati, for 23 years, ending in 1995. The Circolo resumed activity in 1999 and continues to date.

Portelli has been a contributor to the independent left-wing Italian daily paper il manifesto since its founding in 1971. His commentary often includes observations on the United States.

From 2002 to 2008 he was the Mayor of Rome's advisor for historical memory, and he served a year (2006–07) on the City Council of Rome. in 2015 Portelli was awarded the Dan David Prize in the category of "Retrieving the Past: Historians and their Sources."

== Selected publications authored in English ==
=== Books ===
- They Say in Harlan County: An Oral History (New York, NY: Oxford University Press, 2010). ISBN 978-0-19-973568-6
- The Order Has Been Carried Out: History, Memory and Meaning of a Nazi Massacre in Rome (New York, NY: Palgrave Macmillan, 2003). ISBN 978-1-403-96208-9
- The Battle of Valle Giulia: Oral History and the Art of Dialogue (Madison, WI: University of Wisconsin Press, 1997). ISBN 978-0-299-15374-8
- The Text and the Voice: Writing, Speaking and Democracy in American Literature (New York, NY: Columbia University Press, 1994). ISBN 978-0-231-08495-6
- The Death of Luigi Trastulli and Other Stories: Form and Meaning in Oral History (Albany, NY: SUNY Press, 1991). ISBN 978-0-7914-0430-0

Portelli has also published books in Italian about Washington Irving, Joseph Conrad, Mark Twain, Woody Guthrie, and African-American writers.

=== Recording compiled ===
- L'America Della Contestazione I Dischi del Sole, 1969, featuring Frederick Douglass Kirkpatrick, founder of the Deacons for Defense and Justice
- Avanti Popolo: Revolutionary Songs of the Italian Working Class. Paredon Records, 1976; reissued as a CD by Smithsonian Folkways, 2008.
