= Wayne E. Glenn =

American labor union leader (1924–2021)

- Born: Wayne Eugene Glenn; August 24, 1924; Ponca City, Oklahoma, U.S.
- Died: January 3, 2021 (aged 96)
- Occupation: Labor union leader

Wayne Eugene Glenn (August 24, 1924 – January 3, 2021) was an American labor union leader.

Born in Ponca City, Oklahoma, Glenn served in the United States Navy during World War II. After the war, he began working at the International Paper Plant in Camden, Arkansas. He joined the International Brotherhood of Pulp, Sulphite and Paper Mill Workers and soon held various leadership positions in his local union. In 1957, he began working as a full-time representative of the international union, and in 1965, he was elected as a vice-president. In this role, he became known for organizing additional workers in the American South. He also served as secretary-treasurer, and later as president, of the Arkansas AFL-CIO.

The union became part of the United Paperworkers International Union, and in 1978, its president was compelled to stand down over corruption charges. Glenn was appointed as the new president, and in 1979 was also elected as a vice-president of the AFL-CIO. In this post, he became known as an opponent of the federation's president, Lane Kirkland. He retired from the union in 1996, and from the AFL-CIO in 1997, dying in 2021.

Trade union offices
Preceded by Joseph Tonelli	President of the United Paperworkers' International Union; 1978–1996	Succeeded by Boyd D. Young
