= IWNA =

IWNA can refer to

- Independent Workers of North America, defunct labor union in the United States
- International Workshop on Nanotechnology and Application
- Iran Women's News Agency (IWNA) founded by Shahla Habibi
- Inner West Neighbour Aid, charity in New South Wales, Australia
- International Workshop on Networked Appliances, a conference organized by the Institute of Electrical and Electronics Engineers
