= Jack R. Thornell =

American photographer (1939–2026)

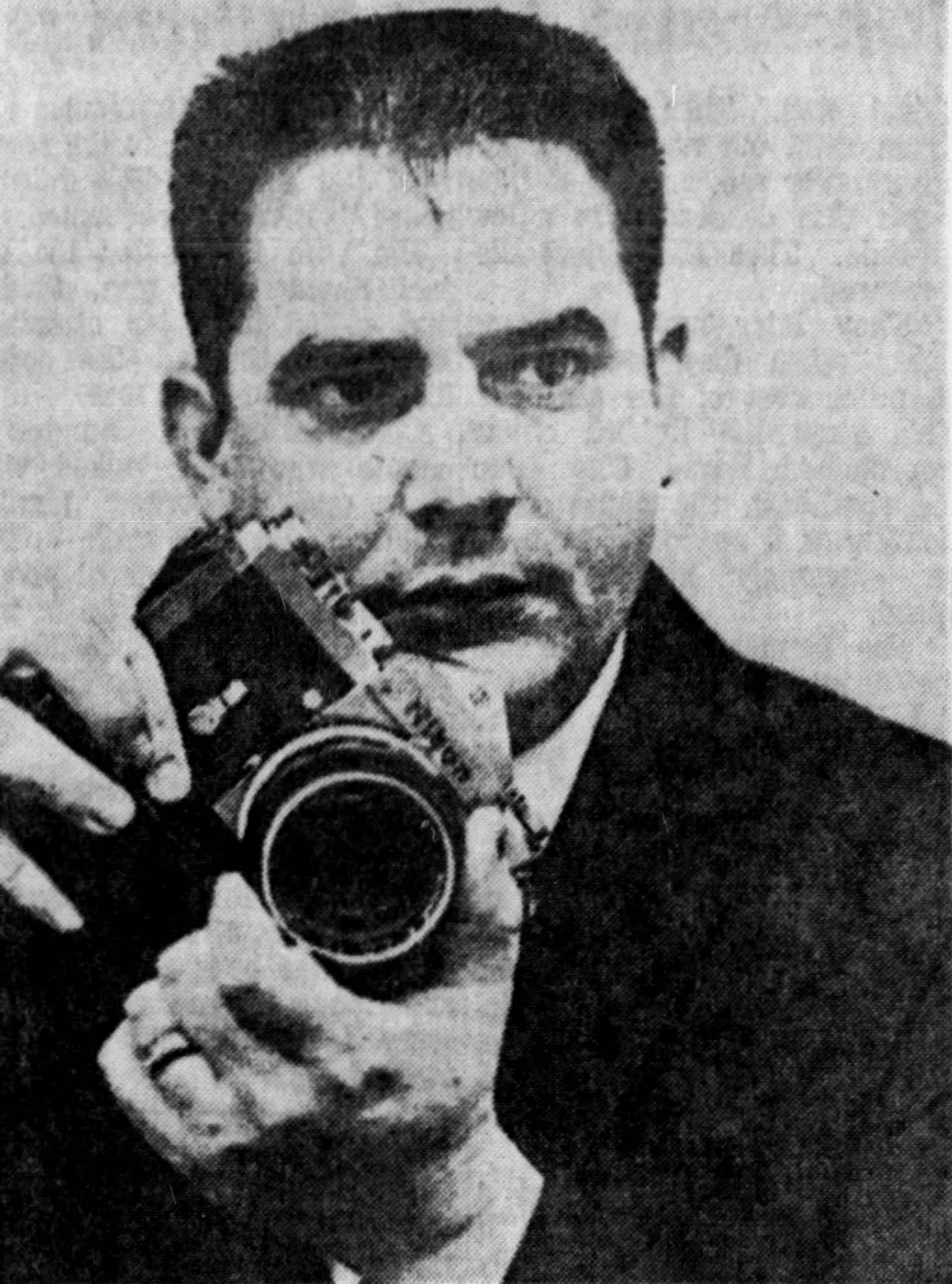
- Thornell in 1967
- Born: Jack Randolph Thornell; August 29, 1939; Vicksburg, Mississippi, U.S.
- Died: April 23, 2026 (aged 86); Metairie, Louisiana, U.S.
- Occupation: Photographer
- Spouse: Carolyn Wilson (m. 1964)
- Children: 2
- Awards: Pulitzer Prize for Photography (1967)

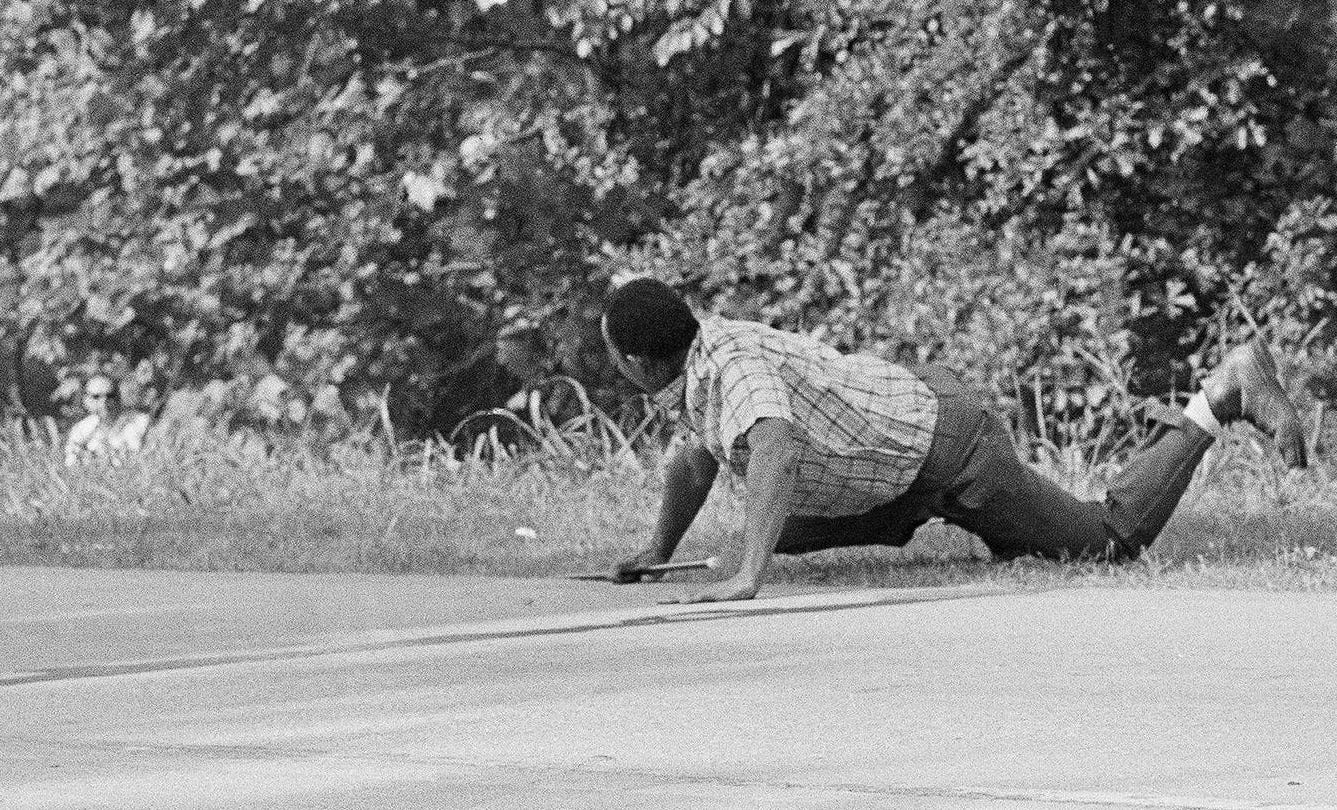
Thornell's Pulitzer Prize-winning photograph of James Meredith

Jack Randolph Thornell (August 29, 1939 – April 23, 2026) was an American photographer. He won a Pulitzer Prize for his photo of James Meredith after the activist was attacked and wounded by a sniper during his June 1966 March Against Fear in Mississippi.

== Life and career ==
Thornell was born in Vicksburg, Mississippi, on August 29, 1939. He served in the Army Signal Corps. He worked as a photographer for the Jackson Daily News (1960–1964) and for decades for the Associated Press.

He married Carolyn Wilson in 1964; they had children Candice and Jay Randolph.

Thornell died from complications of kidney disease at a hospital in Metairie, Louisiana, on April 23, 2026, at the age of 86.

== Awards ==
- 1967 Pulitzer Prize for Photography
