= Boyd D. Young =

American labor union leader (1939-2019)

- Born: Boyd Daniel Young; December 22, 1939; Evadale, Texas, U.S.
- Died: March 11, 2019 (aged 79)
- Occupation: Labor union leader

Boyd Daniel Young (December 22, 1939 – March 11, 2019) was an American labor union leader.

Born in Evadale, Texas, Young began working at the East Texas Pulp & Paper Company. He joined the International Brotherhood of Pulp, Sulphite and Paper Mill Workers, and soon became a shop steward, then in 1971, he was elected as president of his local union. That same year, the union merged into the new United Paperworkers' International Union, with Young continuing in his post.

In 1973, Young was asked by the international union to assist with workers' campaigns in Houston and across east Texas. He was successful in the role, and from 1975 worked full-time for the union as an international representative. In 1988, he became the union's vice president for Region VI.

In 1996, Young defeated Gerald Johnston, to win election as president of the union. From 1997, he also served as a vice-president of the AFL-CIO. As leader of the union, he negotiated a merger which formed the Paper, Allied-Industrial, Chemical and Energy Workers International Union; he became the founding president of the new union, in 1999. He continued to focus on strengthening the union's negotiating position, which he concluded would be best served by a merger into the United Steelworkers of America, which was completed in 2005. He then retired, dying in 2019.

Trade union offices
Preceded by Wayne E. Glenn	President of the United Paperworkers' International Union; 1996–1999	Succeeded by Union merged
Preceded by Union founded	President of the Paper, Allied-Industrial, Chemical and Energy Workers International Union; 1999–2005	Succeeded by Union merged
