= John P. Burke (unionist) =

John Patrick Burke (April 21, 1884 – April 25, 1966) was an American labor unionist and socialist activist.

Born on a farm near Duxbury, Vermont, Burke and his family moved to Franklin, New Hampshire when he was twelve years old. The following year, he began working at a hosiery factory, then later moved to work at the local International Paper Co. plant.

In 1905, Burke joined the International Brotherhood of Paper Makers, then the following year, his local was part of the split which formed the International Brotherhood of Pulp, Sulphite, and Paper Mill Workers. He also joined the Socialist Party of America, and was its candidate in the 1914 New Hampshire gubernatorial election. He took last place, with 1.7% of the vote.

In 1914, Burke was elected as vice-president of the Pulp, Sulphite and Paper Mill Workers. He also became vice-president of the New Hampshire State Federation of Labor. In 1917, he became president-secretary of his union, and in order to take up the post, he moved to Fort Edward, New York. Under his leadership, the union grew dramatically, and by the mid-1950s, it had 165,000 members.

Burke served as leader of the union for many years. In 1962, as he was suffering from poor health, an acting president-secretary was appointed. Burke finally resigned in January 1965, and died a little over a year later.

Trade union offices
Preceded by John Malin	President-Secretary of the International Brotherhood of Pulp, Sulphite, and Paper Mill Workers; 1917–1965	Succeeded by William H. Burnell
