= Joseph Tonelli =

American trade union leader (1908–2000)

Joseph Paul Tonelli (February 26, 1908 – March 4, 2000) was an American trade union leader.

Born in Grove City, Pennsylvania, Tonelli moved to New York City in 1928, where he began working in the paper industry. In the mid-1930s, he helped organize local 243 of the International Brotherhood of Pulp, Sulphite, and Paper Mill Workers, in the Bronx. In 1939, he was appointed as a full-time organizer for the international union. He proved successful in organizing other paper plants, and in 1942 was appointed as chair of the union's Greater New York Organizing Committee.

In 1944, Tonelli was appointed as a vice-president of the union. Although he was frequently alleged to have misused union finances and to have taken objectionable positions in negotiations, whenever the allegations were discussed at union conferences, votes cleared him of wrongdoing. In 1964, Lyndon B. Johnson appointed him to the Social Security Advisory Board.

Tonelli was elected as president of the union in 1965. In this role, he organized a merger between his union and the United Papermakers and Paperworkers, forming the United Paperworkers' International Union in 1972. He then served as the founding president of UPIU. Despite the consolidation, union membership stagnated, and several locals split away from the union.

In October 1973, Tonelli was elected to the AFL-CIO Executive Council alongside the American Federation of Teachers' Albert Shanker. They replaced William Pollock and Joseph Curran. He was made a member of the Order of Saint Gregory the Great, and also made a Knight of Malta.

In May 1976, Tonelli's speech to the Canadian Labour Congress national convention was protested by members of the rival Canadian Paperworkers Union, Canadian Union of Public Employees, and the United Electrical Workers. The CPU had split from UPIU in 1974 was in court with its former parent union over $1.8 million in Canadian workers contributions to the international. Tonelli told reporters that he was not aware of the dispute.

In 1978, he was convicted of embezzling union funds totaling $360,000 and obstruction of justice. He was sentenced to three years in prison and ordered to pay a $15,000 fine. On release, he lived in Yonkers, New York, until his death in 2000.

Trade union offices
Preceded by William H. Burnell	President of the International Brotherhood of Pulp, Sulphite, and Paper Mill Workers; 1965–1972	Succeeded by Union merged
Preceded by Union founded	President of the United Paperworkers' International Union; 1972–1978	Succeeded by Wayne E. Glenn
