= Frederick Douglass Kirkpatrick =

American musician, civil rights activist, and minister (1933–1986)

External videos
- The Ballad of a Watergate Security Guard, 2:32, sung by Frederick Douglass Kirkpatrick, WNYC

Frederick Douglass Kirkpatrick (1933–1986) was an African-American musician, civil rights activist, and minister from Haynesville, Louisiana. In late 1964 he was a co-founder of the Deacons for Defense and Justice, an armed black self-defense group, in the small industrial mill town of Jonesboro, Louisiana, to protect the black community against white violence. Together with Earnest "Chilly Willy" Thomas, Kirkpatrick also founded Deacons chapters in other cities of Louisiana, and in Mississippi and Alabama.

An associate of Rev. Martin Luther King Jr. in the Southern Christian Leadership Conference (SCLC), Kirkpatrick was a singer/songwriter, serving as director of folk culture. Beginning in 1968, he recorded three albums with Smithsonian Folkways Recordings. One was a recording of the 1978 Louisiana Folk Fest, an annual event which Kirkpatrick had conceived and regularly hosted, to preserve and celebrate musical culture. He used music to teach African-American history, including the Civil Rights Movement, to schoolchildren. Later in life he settled in New York City.

== Biography ==
Named after the renowned 19th-century abolitionist Frederick Douglass, Kirkpatrick was born in 1933 in Haynesville, northern Louisiana. His father John L. Kirkpatrick was a minister and his mother died young. He had four sisters and a brother who survived to adulthood. They attended the local segregated schools and church, growing up steeped in gospel and spiritual music. Kirkpatrick learned to play the guitar and sing, and began to compose his own music. His parents encouraged his education and he graduated from Grambling College (now Grambling University), a historically black college, with a degree in biology.

Kirkpatrick became a member of the Southern Christian Leadership Conference (SCLC), which formed in the 1950s to work for civil rights of African Americans by gathering together the power of their churches. He ultimately served as director of folk culture for the SCLC. He continued to sing, play the guitar and write his own music. Among his best-known songs was his version of Pete Seeger's "Everybody's Got a Right to Live", described as "an anthem of the civil rights movement."

Resistance to the civil rights movement was violent in many areas of the South, including in the industrial mill towns of northern Louisiana. By the early 1960s, Kirkpatrick was living and working in Jonesboro, Louisiana, a small industrial mill town in the northern part of the state, where CORE members had also been working for civil rights gains.

Faced with continued violence from KKK members, in November 1964 Kirkpatrick and Earnest "Chilly Willy" Thomas co-founded the Deacons for Defense and Justice in the town in Jackson Parish. The minority of black workers had been in class conflict with whites for years, in addition to struggling with oppression under the state's Jim Crow laws. They met challenges in a different way than rural blacks in agricultural areas, demanding that CORE follow their lead.

As black workers sought civil rights in Jonesboro, they had come under intimidation and attack by members of the local Ku Klux Klan (KKK) chapter. Kirkpatrick and Thomas formed the Deacons for Defense and Justice as an armed group to protect civil rights workers, their families and the black community.

That same year, Kirkpatrick was ordained as a minister in the Church of God and Christ in Jonesboro. This was founded in the late 19th century as a small Protestant fundamentalist sect based in Lexington, Mississippi. As it embraced the holiness movement, it grew considerably in the post-World War II years, establishing congregations throughout the South, and following the Great Migration of African Americans to the North to establish congregations in major cities there. It is now a global church with a membership of millions.

During 1965, Kirkpatrick and Thomas founded Deacons chapters in other cities of Louisiana. In February 1965 they traveled 300 miles to the small mill town of Bogalusa, Louisiana, where black workers were similarly motivated to defend themselves. They also set up Deacons chapters in other towns, and in Mississippi and Alabama as well, where many blacks had also been victimized by white vigilantes.

Armed defense had been increasingly a part of black strategy since 1960 in such cities as Clarksdale and Natchez, Mississippi, and in rural areas of the state, even among NAACP leaders. They kept guns in their homes to guard against attacks.

== Musician ==
In 1968, soon after the assassination of Dr. Martin Luther King, Kirkpatrick recorded an album with Jimmy Collier, Everybody's Got a Right to Live, for Smithsonian Folkways Recordings. The collection of songs from the civil rights era is also available by download, cassette, or CD.

In 1969 Kirkpatrick was featured on Alessandro Portelli's L'America Della Contestazione (I Dischi del Sole) singing "Bourgeois School", a rewrite of Lead Belly's "Bourgeois Blues".

Brother Kirkpatrick sang "Bring 'Em Home" and "Give Peace a Chance" on stage with Pete Seeger at the enormous anti-Vietnam War march and rally on November 15, 1969, in Washington, DC, inspiring an audience of more than half a million people.

In 1972, Kirkpatrick recorded Ballads of Black America (FW07751), as lead singer and guitar, with Pete Seeger, playing banjo, and Jeanne Humphries on bass. This was also for Smithsonian Folkways Recordings. He wrote and composed the songs about leading figures of black history, after learning at a 1969 performance in a Brooklyn school, that black children had few books and music that taught about the contributions of their people to the United States and the world. Kirkpatrick's ballads honor seven leaders, including Harriet Tubman, Paul Robeson, and Martin Luther King Jr., and the Deacons for Defense and Justice.

In 1974, Kirkpatrick and Seeger appeared on "Pete Seeger and Brother Kirk Visit Sesame Street", the first album based on the Sesame Street TV show containing original music. Kirk and Seeger performed folk songs, children's songs, and original compositions, accompanied by Big Bird, Oscar the Grouch, and a chorus of children.

Known as Reverend Douglass Kirkpatrick, he continued to write and perform songs, accompanying himself on guitar. In 1975 he performed Ron Turner's 1972 song "The Ballad of Frank Wills" on WNYC. It was about the break-in at Watergate and ultimate resignation of President Richard M. Nixon, from the perspective of the security guard who found the first evidence. This was part of Kirkpatrick's full performance on Dave Sear's Folk and Baroque radio program, WNYC, which aired January 1, 1975. This song was used in Episode 3 of the 2022 TV miniseries White House Plumbers.

Kirkpatrick founded and hosted the Louisiana Folk Fest, to pull communities and families together and preserve their music. In 1978 the event was recorded by Smithsonian Folkways, the third recording Kirkpatrick made with them. It featured gospels and spirituals, sung by family and friends.

== Later years ==
Kirkpatrick moved with his wife to New York City, where he served as a Baptist minister. He and his wife had had three daughters and a son together, all of whom settled in Grambling as adults.

He died August 16, 1986, at St. Luke's Hospital in New York. He was survived by "his wife, the former Annie Pearl Thompson; his father, the Rev. John L. Kirkpatrick; his stepmother, Arabella; three daughters, Cameillia Ann, Alfreda Denise and Brunella Roanna, and a son, Howard Curtis, all of Grambling; four sisters, Mary Helen Staten of Lafayette, La., Lovie Leola Stakes of Chicago, Lucille Bradford of Midland, Tex., and Mae Faye Hunter of Argo, Ill.; a brother, Robert L. Kirkpatrick of Dallas, and seven grandchildren."
