= Playthings, Jewelry and Novelty Workers' International Union =

The Playthings, Jewelry and Novelty Workers' International Union (PJNWIU) was a labor union representing workers in various related industries in the United States.

The union was founded in 1938 as the International Union of Playthings and Novelty Workers, an affiliate of the Congress of Industrial Organizations. In 1940, it absorbed several locals representing paper industry workers, and was renamed as the United Paper, Novelty and Toy Workers' International Union. On January 1, 1944, its paper workers' section was spun off as the Paper Workers' Organizing Committee, and the remainder of the union became the PJNWIU.

By 1953, the union had 30,000 members. In May 1954, it merged into the Retail, Wholesale and Department Store Union.

== Presidents ==
1938: Anthony H. Esposito
1952: Alex Bail
