= Independent Workers of North America =

Defunct independent trade union for cement workers in the United States of America

- Merged into: United Paperworkers International Union
- Successor: Paper, Allied-Industrial, Chemical and Energy Workers International Union
- Dissolved: 1991; 35 years ago
- Type: Trade union
- Legal status: Defunct
- Location: United States of America

Independent Workers of North America was an American trade union created as a result of a split within the cement division of the International Brotherhood of Boilermakers, Iron Ship Builders, Blacksmiths, Forgers and Helpers, known as the Boilermakers Union.

In 1991, cement workers from the Independent Workers of North America joined the United Paperworkers International Union (UPIU).

In 1999, the United Paperworkers International Union (UPIU) and Oil, Chemical, and Atomic Workers Union International Union (OCAW) merged to create the Paper, Allied-Industrial, Chemical and Energy Workers International Union (PACE).
