= Deacons for Defense and Justice =

Armed Black-American self-defense group

The Deacons for Defense and Justice was a Black American self-defense group founded in November 1964, during the civil rights era in the United States, in the mill town of Jonesboro, Louisiana. On February 21, 1965—the day of Malcolm X's assassination—the first affiliated chapter was founded in Bogalusa, Louisiana, followed by a total of 20 other chapters in this state, Mississippi, Arkansas, and Alabama. It was intended to protect civil rights activists and their families, threatened both by white vigilantes and discriminatory treatment by police under Jim Crow laws. The Bogalusa chapter gained national attention during the summer of 1965 in its violent struggles with the Ku Klux Klan.

By 1968, the Deacons' activities were declining, following passage of the Voting Rights Act of 1965, the entry of Black people into politics in the South, and the rise of the Black Power movement. Black people worked to gain control of more political and economic activities in their communities.

A television movie, Deacons for Defense (2003), directed by Bill Duke and starring Forest Whitaker, was aired about the 1965 events in Bogalusa. The movie inspired Mauricelm-Lei Millere to meet Deacon Hicks at his Hicks House in Bogalusa, Louisiana. The Robert "Bob" Hicks House in Bogalusa commemorates one of the leaders of the Deacons in that city; it was listed on the National Register of Historic Places in 2015. Fundraising continues for a civil rights museum in Bogalusa to honor the work of the Deacons for Defense; it was expected to open in 2018.

== History ==
The Deacons were not the first champions of armed defense during the civil rights movement, but in November 1964, they were the first to organize as a force.

According to historian Annelieke Dirks:

Even Martin Luther King Jr.—the icon of nonviolence—employed armed bodyguards and had guns in his house during the early stages of the Montgomery bus boycott in 1956. Glenn Smiley, an organizer of the nonviolent and pacifist Fellowship of Reconciliation (FOR), observed during a house visit to King that the police did not allow the minister a weapon permit, but "the place is an arsenal."

Smiley convinced King that he could not keep such weapons or plan armed "self-defense", as it was inconsistent with his public positions on non-violence. Dirks explored the emergence of Black groups for self-defense in Clarksdale and Natchez, Mississippi from 1960 to 1965.

In many areas of the Deep South, local chapters of the Ku Klux Klan or other white insurgents operated outside the law, and white-dominated police forces practiced discrimination against Black people. In Jonesboro, an industrial town in northern Louisiana, the KKK harassed local activists, burned crosses on the lawns of Black Americans, and burned down five churches, a Masonic Hall, and a Baptist center.

Scholar Akinyele O. Umoja notes that by 1965, both the Student Non-violent Coordinating Committee (SNCC) and CORE supported armed self-defense, although they had long promoted non-violence as a tactic to achieve civil rights. They began to believe that changes in federal law were not sufficient to advance civil rights or to protect activists locally. National CORE leadership, including James Farmer, publicly acknowledged a relationship between CORE and the Deacons for Defense in Louisiana. This alliance between the two organizations highlighted the concept of armed self-defense embraced by many Black people in the South, who had long been subject to white violence. A significant portion of SNCC's southern-born leadership and staff also supported armed self-defense.

Robert F. Williams, president of the NAACP chapter in Monroe, North Carolina, transformed his local NAACP chapter into an armed self-defense unit. He was criticized for this by the national leaders of the NAACP. After he was charged by the state with kidnapping a white couple whom he had sheltered during local violence related to the Freedom Riders in 1961, Williams and his wife left the country, going into exile in Cuba. After Williams' return in 1969, his trial on these charges was scheduled in 1975; that year the state reviewed the case and withdrew the charges. Fannie Lou Hamer of the Mississippi Freedom Democratic Party was another activist who armed herself; she said that in 1964 during Freedom Summer, she kept several loaded guns under her bed.

== Founding of the Deacons for Defense ==
Black Americans were harassed and attacked by white KKK vigilantes in the mill town of Jonesboro, Louisiana in 1964 including the torching of five churches, a Masonic Hall and a Baptist center. Given these threats, Earnest "Chilly Willy" Thomas and Frederick Douglass Kirkpatrick founded the Deacons for Defense in November 1964 to protect civil rights workers, their families and the Black community against the local KKK. Most of the Deacons were veterans with combat experience from the Korean War and World War II. Born in Jonesboro on November 20, 1935, Thomas grew up in the segregated state decades after the white-dominated state legislature had disenfranchised most Black people at the turn of the century and imposed Jim Crow laws. Drawn into local rivalries between Black and white children for swimming hole rights, Thomas learned that rights and access come not to those who ask but rather those who fight.

In 1964, during Freedom Summer and a period of extensive voter education and organizing for registration, especially in Mississippi, the Congress of Racial Equality established a Freedom House in Jonesboro. It became a target of the Klan who resented white activists staying there. Because of repeated attacks on the Freedom House, as well as the church burnings, the Black community decided to organize to defend it. Before The Deacons of Defense and Justice officially formed, two groups were operating in Jonesboro to protect activists. One group acted as sentries outside the Freedom House, led by Percy Lee Bradford, a stock room worker, and Earnest Thomas. Frederick Douglass Kirkpatrick, a high school teacher, organized a second group that volunteered to monitor police arrests of Black Americans while also working to keep the community safe. Thomas was one of the first volunteers to guard the house. According to historian Lance Hill, "Thomas was eager to work with CORE but he had reservations about the nonviolent terms imposed by the young activists". Around this time, CORE began protesting against the segregation of a public swimming pool as well as the Jonesboro Public Library. The Ku Klux Klan and local police organized a caravan to intimidate the protesters and the African American community in Jonesboro. Thomas and Kirkpatrick organized a twenty men group to protect the citizens of Jonesboro, starting the Deacons.

Thomas, who had military training, quickly emerged as the leader of this budding defense organization. He was joined by Kirkpatrick, a civil rights activist and member of Southern Christian Leadership Conference (SCLC), who had been ordained that year as a minister in the Pentecostal Church of God in Christ. Coretta Jackson acted as treasurer for The Deacons Of Defense and Justice. We Had been arrested for possession of a concealed weapon while protecting protesting students. The Deacons had strict membership criteria for applicants. They accepted only male American citizens over the age of 21. They preferred married men with military service, as well as registered voters. They refused men with a reputation for "hotheadedness". They vigorously upheld their stance of only acting in defense. They continued guarding CORE as a means to further the civil rights agenda. Every member of the Deacons had to pledge his life for the defense of justice, Black people, and for civil rights workers.

During the day, the men concealed their guns. At night they carried them openly, as was allowed by the law, to discourage Klan activity at the site and in the Black community. In early 1965, Black students were picketing the local high school in Jonesboro for integration. They were confronted by hostile police ready to use fire trucks with hoses against them. A car carrying four Deacons arrived. In view of the police, these men loaded their shotguns. The police ordered the fire truck to withdraw. This was the first time in the 20th century, as Hill observes, that "an armed Black organization had successfully used weapons to defend a lawful protest against an attack by law enforcement". Hill also wrote "In Jonesboro, the Deacons made history when they compelled Louisiana governor John McKeithen to intervene in the city's civil rights crisis and require a compromise with city leaders — the first capitulation to the civil rights movement by a Deep South governor".

After traveling 300 miles to Bogalusa, in southeast Louisiana, on February 21, 1965, Kirkpatrick, Thomas and a CORE member worked with local leaders to organize the first affiliated Deacons chapter. Black activists in the company mill town were being attacked by the local and powerful Ku Klux Klan. The police and sheriff in Bogalusa as well as most government organizations were all infiltrated by the Klan. The only protection the people of Bogalusa had against the Klan was the Deacons. Although the Civil Rights Act of 1964 had been passed, Black people were making little progress toward integration of public facilities in the city or registering to vote. Activists Bob Hicks (1929–2010), Charles Sims, and A. Z. Young, workers at the Crown-Zellerbach plant (Georgia-Pacific after 1985, later acquired by another), led this new chapter of the Deacons for Defense. Charles Sims, a World War II veteran was the president of the Bogalusa chapter of the Deacons. He acted as spokesman for the Deacons, demanding fair treatment and threatening violent retaliation in the event of attack. Sims considered the Deacons a "defense guard unit" who had formed simply "because we got tired of the women, the children being harassed by the white night-riders".

The Chicago Chapter of the Deacons for Defense and Justice was formed by Earnest Thomas, vice president of the Jonesboro chapter, in 1965. The Deacons intended to spread throughout the North and the West but were unsuccessful because their tactics were less effective outside of the South.

In the summer of 1965, the Bogalusa chapter campaigned for integration and came into regular conflict with the Klan in the city. The state police established a base there in the spring in expectation of violence after the Deacons organized. Before the summer, the first Black deputy sheriff of the local Washington Parish was assassinated by whites.

The Deacons' militant confrontation with the Klan in Bogalusa throughout the summer of 1965 was planned to gain federal government intervention. These tactics proved successful when "in July 1965, escalating hostilities between the Deacons and the Klan in Bogalusa provoked the federal government to use Reconstruction-era laws to order local police departments to protect civil rights workers". The Deacons also initiated a regional organizing campaign, founding a total of 21 formal chapters and 46 affiliates in other cities.

== Role ==
The Deacons had close relationships with other civil rights groups that practiced non-violence. Such support by the Deacons enabled the NAACP and CORE to maintain their desired parameters of non-violence.

The Deacons provided protection for CORE leader, James Farmer in 1965. Farmer arrived in Bogalusa in order to aid in desegregation and required the protection of the Deacons. They ensured his safety from the time he arrived at the New Orleans airport and provided security while Farmer spoke and marched at desegregation events.

The Deacons attracted media attention for their protection of Charles Evers' desegregation campaign in Natchez, Mississippi. Attention was given to them because, unlike similar groups that had come before, the Deacons did not hide their names from the media. This coupled with their use of armed self-defense, and modest beginnings, made them heroes to harassed black communities.

After the successful integration of the Jonesboro Public Library, the Ku Klux Klan burned crosses in response. The Deacons wrote leaflets threatening to kill anyone who burned a cross. The leaflets were distributed into the homes of white people by their black house workers. The cross-burnings stopped in response.

On July 8, 1965, at a nonviolent march on city hall, hundreds of whites gathered to throw rocks at the assembled protesters. The white antagonists surrounded the protesters. A twenty-one year old insurance salesman and Air Force veteran named Henry Austin confronted the mob and fired a warning shot. He then shot an advancing attacker three times in the chest. After the shooting the mob dispersed. Both Austin and the attacker survived the encounter.

In Bogalusa, the Deacons worked with CORE on their campaigns. When the local police and Ku Klux Klan joined forces to attempt to harass two white CORE members and drive them out of town, the Deacons intervened on behalf of the white volunteers, protecting them from the police. The Deacons stood guard outside CORE headquarters and patrolled the black community. The Deacons would protect both white and black activists as they canvassed looking for voters. They would also transport civil rights workers into and out of Bogalusa. There were by-laws that each member had to uphold. Sims was very clear about the roles of the Deacons: they were to act in self-defense only.

The Deacons were instrumental in other campaigns led by the Civil Rights Movement. Activist James Meredith organized the June 1966 March Against Fear, to go from Memphis, Tennessee to Jackson, Mississippi. He wanted a low-key affair but was shot and wounded early in the march. Other major civil rights leaders and organizations recruited hundreds and then thousands of marchers in order to continue Meredith's effort.

According to in a 1999 article, activist Stokely Carmichael encouraged having the Deacons provide security for the remainder of the march. After some debate, many civil rights leaders agreed, including Rev. Martin Luther King Jr. Umoja wrote, "Finally, though expressing reservations, King conceded to Carmichael's proposals to maintain unity in the march and the movement. The involvement and association of the Deacons with the march signified a shift in the civil rights movement, which had been popularly projected as a 'nonviolent movement."'

Stokely Carmichael had first made a speech about Black Power in Mobile, Alabama in 1965, when marchers demonstrating for the vote reached the state capital from Selma. In 1967 Carmichael said, "Those of us who advocate Black Power are quite clear in our own minds that a 'non-violent' approach to civil rights is an approach black people cannot afford and a luxury white people do not deserve."

In his 2006 book, Hill discusses the difficulties in achieving change on the local level in the South after national leaders and activists left. He wrote:

the hard truth is that these organizations produced few victories in their local projects in the Deep South--if success is measured by the ability to force changes in local government policy and create self-governing and sustainable local organizations that could survive when the national organizations departed ... The Deacons' campaigns frequently resulted in substantial and unprecedented victories at the local level, producing real power and self-sustaining organizations.

According to Hill, local (armed) groups laid the foundation for equal opportunities for Black Americans.

According to a 2007 article by Dirks, the usual histories of the Civil Rights Movement tend to overlook such organizations as the Deacons. She says there are several reasons: First, the dominant ideology of the Movement was one of non-violence. Second, threats to the lives of Deacons' members required them to maintain secrecy to avoid terrorist attacks. In addition, they recruited only mature male members, in contrast to other more informal self-defense efforts, in which women and teenagers sometimes played a role. Finally, the organization was relatively short-lived, fading by 1968. In that period, there was a national shift in attention to the issues of Black communities in the North and the rise of the Black Power movement in 1966. The Deacons were overshadowed by The Black Panther Party, which became noted for its militancy.

== FBI investigation begins in 1965 ==
In February 1965, after an article in The New York Times about the Deacons in Jonesboro, FBI Director J. Edgar Hoover became interested in the group. His office sent a memo to its Louisiana field offices: "Because of the potential for violence indicated, you are instructed to immediately initiate an investigation of the DDJ [Deacons for Defense and Justice]." As was eventually exposed in the late 1970s, the FBI established the COINTELPRO program, through which its agents were involved in many illegal activities against organizations that Hoover deemed "a threat to the American way".

The Bureau ultimately produced more than 1,500 pages of comprehensive and relatively accurate records on the Deacons and their activities, largely through numerous informants close to or who had infiltrated the organization. Members of the Deacons were repeatedly questioned and intimidated by F.B.I. agents. Harvie Johnson (the last surviving original member of the Deacons for Defense and Justice) was interviewed by two agents during this period. He said they asked only how the Deacons obtained their weapons, never questioning him about the Klan activity or police actions they were responding to. Although the FBI and white media regarded the Deacons as bringers of race warfare, they actually worked closely with CORE in their nonviolent protests as a way to bring about change in Bogalusa. The Federal Government finally intervened and forced local police to uphold the law and protect citizens' right. As a result of the Deacons' actions the Klan had to restrict themselves to night terror raids. The Deacons served as a symbol of power and pride, and undermined the stereotype of black submission.

According to columnist Ken Blackwell in 2007, activist Roy Innis had said that the Deacons "forced the Klan to re-evaluate their actions and often change their undergarments".

== Commemoration ==
- The Robert "Bob" Hicks House in Bogalusa is listed on the National Register of Historic Places. The Robert "Bob" Hicks Foundation is in the process of restoring and preserving the house.

== Representation in other media ==
- Michael D'Antonio wrote a fictional short story, "Deacons for Defense", based on events in Bogalusa, Louisiana.https://www.imdb.com/name/nm1256877/
- The Deacons in Bogalusa are the subject of a 2003 television movie, Deacons for Defense. Based on D'Antonio's story and produced by Showtime, it was directed by Bill Duke. The movie stars Academy Award winner Forest Whitaker, with Ossie Davis, and Jonathan Silverman. The film explores development of the group through events of 1964 and 1965. The plot follows the transition of a black family and community members from belief in non-violence to supporting armed self-defense.

== See also ==
- Robert F. Williams
- T. R. M. Howard
- Chambers v. Mississippi
