= Deacons for Defense (film) =

2003 TV film by Bill Duke

- Teleplay by: Richard Wesley; Frank Military
- Story by: Michael D'Antonio
- Directed by: Bill Duke
- Starring: Forest Whitaker; Christopher Britton; Ossie Davis; Jonathan Silverman; Adam Weiner; Marcus Johnson
- Theme music composer: Michel Colombier
- Countries of origin: United States; Canada
- Original language: English

Production
- Producer: Robert Rehme
- Editor: Harry Keramidas
- Running time: 95 minutes

Original release
- Release: February 16, 2003

Deacons for Defense is a 2003 American television drama film directed by Bill Duke. The television film stars Forest Whitaker, Christopher Britton, Ossie Davis, Jonathan Silverman, Adam Weiner, and Marcus Johnson. Based on a story by Michael D'Antonio, the teleplay was written by Richard Wesley and Frank Military.

The film is based on the activities of the Deacons for Defense and Justice in 1965 in Bogalusa, Louisiana. The African-American self-defense organization was founded in February 1965 as an affiliate of the founding chapter in Jonesboro, Louisiana, to protect activists working with the Congress for Racial Equality (CORE), others advancing the Civil Rights Movement, and their families. Bogalusa was a company town, developed in 1906–1907 around a sawmill and paper mill operations. In the 1960s, the area was dominated by the Ku Klux Klan. During the summer of 1965, there were frequent conflicts between the Deacons and the Klan.

== Plot ==
Marcus Clay (modeled on Bob Hicks) organizes an all-black group dedicated to patrolling the black section of town and protecting residents from "white backlash" in 1965. Activists continue the struggle to gain social justice after passage of the Civil Rights Act of 1964 ending legal racial segregation.

== Main cast ==
- Forest Whitaker as Marcus Clay
- Ossie Davis as Reverend Gregory
- Christopher Britton as William Chase
- Jonathan Silverman as Michael Deane
- Tyrone Benskin as Archie
- Paul Benjamin as Otis
- Melanie Nicholls-King as Rose Clay
- Adam Weiner as Charles Hillibrand
- Gene Mack as TJ
- Mpho Koaho as Baily
- Rufus Crawford as Deacon
- Brian Paul as Holden
- Timothy Burd as Lester Conley
- David Black as Alphin
- Marcus Johnson as Young Marcus
- Aaron Walpole as Jimmy
- Joe Bostick as City Attorney
- Francis X. McCarthy as Judge Christenberry
- Shawn Corbett as Federal Agent
- Matt Birman as Rioter
- Craig Eldridge as US Attorney
- Patricia Shirley as Church Singer
- Sharon Riley as Church Singer
- Quancetia Hamilton as Woman
