= Paul L. Phillips =

Paul L. Phillips (August 10, 1904 – February 6, 1975) was an American labor union leader.

Born in Strong, Arkansas, Phillips studied at Arkansas A & M College and the Louisiana Polytechnic Institute. He qualified in business administration, but left in 1930, short of money, and worked various short-term jobs before becoming a paper maker. He joined the International Brotherhood of Paper Makers (IBPM) in 1932, while working for the International Paper Company, and became the founding president of a new local. From 1937, he worked full-time for the international union, then was elected as one of its vice-presidents in 1942. During World War II, he served on the New York division of the War Manpower Commission, and on the Paperboard Labor Advisory Committee of the War Production Board.

In 1948, Phillips was elected as president of the IBPM. He led it into a merger with the United Paperworkers of America in 1957, which formed the United Papermakers and Paperworkers, becoming founding president of the new union. That year, he was also elected as a vice-president of the AFL-CIO. By 1968, he was in poor health, and retired from his union posts. He moved to Leesburg, Florida, where he died in 1975.

Trade union offices
Preceded by Matthew J. Burns	President of the International Brotherhood of Paper Makers; 1948–1957	Succeeded by Union merged
Preceded by Union founded	President of the United Papermakers and Paperworkers; 1957–1968	Succeeded by Harry Sayre
Preceded by William A. Lee; J. Scott Milne	American Federation of Labor delegate to the Trades Union Congress; 1954; With: James Suffridge	Succeeded by Michael Fox; C. J. Haggerty
