= United Paperworkers' International Union =

The United Paperworkers' International Union (UPIU) was a labor union representing workers involved in making paper, and later various industrial workers, in the United States and Canada.

The union was founded on August 9, 1972, when the International Brotherhood of Pulp, Sulphite and Paper Mill Workers merged with the United Papermakers and Paperworkers. Like both its predecessors, it was chartered by the AFL–CIO. On formation, the union had 389,000 members. In 1974, the large majority of its Canadian section split away, to form the Canadian Paperworkers' Union.

In 1978, Joseph Tonelli, the union's president, was indicted on a charge of embezzling $360,000 of union money.

In 1987 and 1988, UPIU members struck against International Paper in Jay, Maine. The strike generated international attention but ultimately ended in defeat for the strikers and the permanent replacement of union members with non-union replacements.

The Independent Workers of North America union merged into the UPIU in 1991, followed in 1994 by the Allied Industrial Workers of America. On January 4, 1999, the union merged with the Oil, Chemical and Atomic Workers International Union, to form the Paper, Allied-Industrial, Chemical and Energy Workers International Union.

== Presidents ==
1972: Joseph Tonelli
1978: Wayne Glenn
1996: Boyd D. Young
