= Paper, Allied-Industrial, Chemical and Energy Workers International Union =

Former trade union of the United States

PACE
- Paper, Allied-Industrial, Chemical and Energy Workers' International Union
- Merged into: United Steelworkers
- Founded: January 4, 1999
- Dissolved: January 11, 2005
- Location(s): United States & Canada
- Key people: Boyd Young (President)

The Paper, Allied-Industrial, Chemical and Energy Workers International Union (PACE) was an international union that represented workers in the United States and Canada. PACE was founded on January 4, 1999, by the merger of the United Paperworkers' International Union with the Oil, Chemical and Atomic Workers International Union.

Like all labor unions, PACE fought for rights, wage raises, and improvement of working conditions for workers in such fields as: the paper industry, the oil industry, chemicals, nuclear materials, pharmaceuticals, automobile parts, motorcycles, tissues, toys, cement, corn sugar, etc.

On January 11, 2005, the union announced a merger with the United Steel Workers of America. The new union, with 860,000 active members in the United States and Canada, was the largest industrial labor union in North America. The union is known as the United Steel, Paper and Forestry, Rubber, Manufacturing, Energy, Allied-Industrial and Service Workers International Union, abbreviated as the "United Steelworkers" or by the acronym USW.

Throughout its existence, the union was led by president Boyd Young.
