= International Brotherhood of Paper Makers =

Labor union of United States

The International Brotherhood of Paper Makers (IBPM) was a labor union representing workers involved in making paper in the United States, Canada and Newfoundland.

The union originated in 1884 as a social club, in Holyoke, Massachusetts. On May 19, 1893, it was chartered by the American Federation of Labor as an international union. Originally named the United Brotherhood of Papermakers, it added "of America" to its name in 1897. In 1898, machine tenders left the union, to form the International Paper Machine Tenders' Union. This rejoined in 1902, when the union renamed itself as the IBPM. Initially, the union also represented pulp and sulphite workers, but they split away in 1906, to form the International Brotherhood of Pulp, Sulphite, and Paper Mill Workers.

By 1926, the union had 7,000 members. This figure grew rapidly, and by 1953, it had 208,189 members. From 1955, it was affiliated to the AFL–CIO, and in 1957, it merged with the United Paperworkers of America, to form the United Papermakers and Paperworkers.

== Presidents ==
1902: George Mackey
1905: Jeremiah T. Carey
1924: Matthew H. Parker
1926: William R. Smith
1930: Matthew J. Burns
1940: Arthur Huggins
1944: Matthew J. Burns
1948: Paul L. Phillips
