= United Paperworkers of America =

American labor union

The United Paperworkers of America (UPA) was a labor union representing workers involved in making paper in the United States.

The union's origins lay in the United Paper, Novelty, and Toy Workers' International Union, which was affiliated to the Congress of Industrial Organizations (CIO). On January 1, 1944, the CIO spun the paper workers' section off from its parent union, as the Paper Workers' Organizing Committee. On October 27, 1947, this was re-chartered as the UPA. By 1953, the union had 50,000 members.

In 1955, the CIO became part of the AFL–CIO, and on March 6, 1957, the UPA merged with the International Brotherhood of Paper Makers, to form the United Papermakers and Paperworkers.

The union was led by president Harry Sayre.
