= March Against Fear =

1966 demonstration in the US Civil Rights Movement

- Part of the Civil Rights Movement
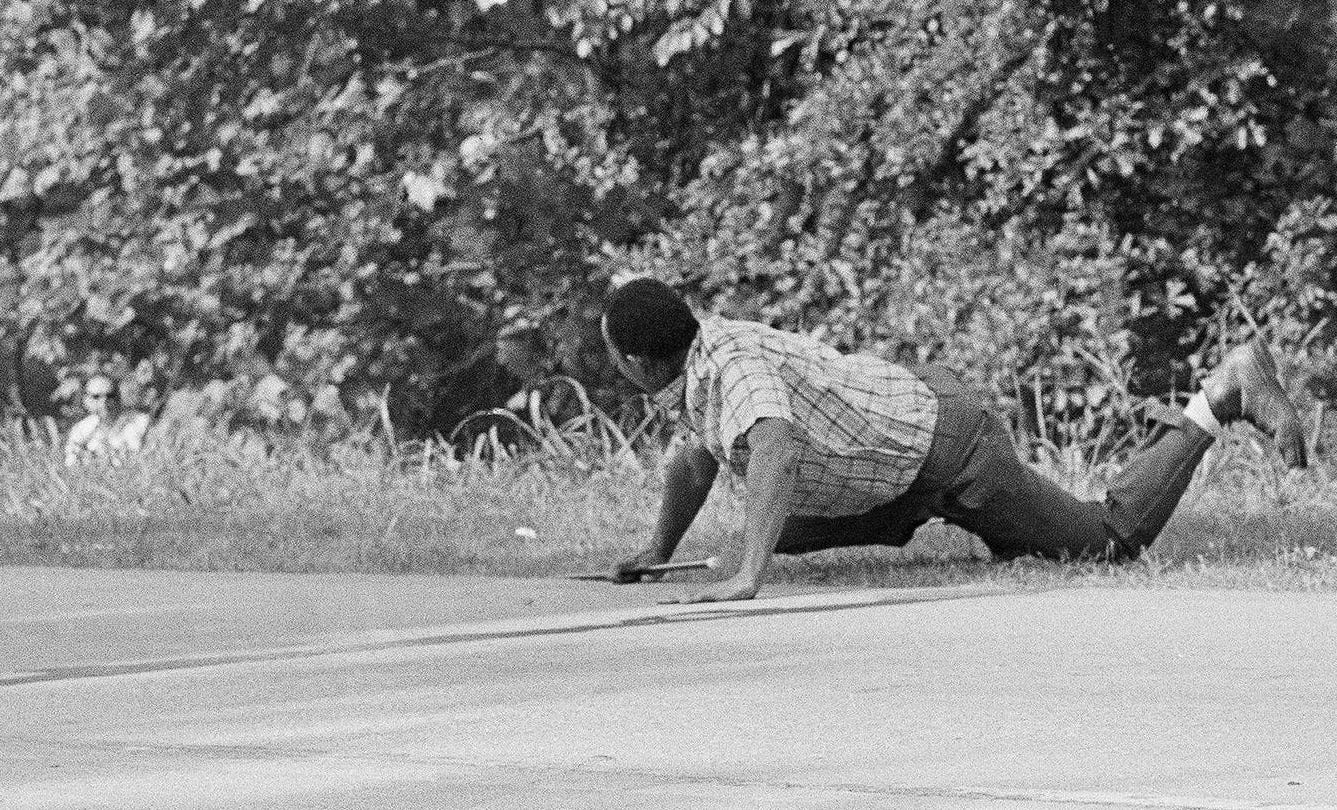
- Civil rights activist James Meredith lies on the ground after being shot while walking on June 6, 1966 in Hernando, Mississippi. The gunman, Aubrey James Norvell, is seen in the bushes on the left. This photograph won the 1967 Pulitzer Prize for Photography.
- Date: June 5 – June 26, 1966
- Location: Memphis, Tennessee; Mississippi Delta; Jackson, Mississippi
- Result: "Black Power" speech delivered by Stokely Carmichael; 4,000 African Americans registered to vote

Parties
Solo marcher; Student Nonviolent Coordinating Committee (SNCC); Southern Christian Leadership Conference (SCLC); Congress of Racial Equality (CORE); Medical Committee for Human Rights (MCHR); Deacons for Defense and Justice (DDJ)	Lone sniper

Lead figures
Solo marcher: James Meredith; SCLC member: Martin Luther King Jr.; SNCC members: Stokely Carmichael; Cleveland Sellers; CORE member: Floyd McKissick; DDJ member: Earnest Thomas	Sniper: Aubrey James Norvell

The March Against Fear was a major 1966 demonstration in the Civil Rights Movement in the South. Activist James Meredith launched the event on June 5, 1966, intending to make a solitary walk from Memphis, Tennessee, to Jackson, Mississippi via the Mississippi Delta, starting at Memphis's Peabody Hotel and proceeding to the Mississippi state line, then continuing through, respectively, the Mississippi cities of Hernando, Grenada, Greenwood, Indianola, Belzoni, Yazoo City, and Canton before arriving at Jackson's City Hall. The total distance marched was approximately 270 miles over a period of 21 days. The goal was to counter the continuing racism in the Mississippi Delta after passage of federal civil rights legislation in the previous two years and to encourage African Americans in the state to register to vote. He invited only individual black men to join him and did not want it to be a large media event dominated by major civil rights organizations.

On the second day of his walk, June 6, 1966, Meredith was shot and wounded by Aubrey James Norvell, a white sniper, and was hospitalized for treatment. Davi Johnson Thornton suggests that Meredith was a target for such rituals of attack because he had made highly publicized challenges to Mississippi's racial order, and had framed his walk as a confident repudiation of custom.

Major civil rights organizations rallied to the cause, vowing to carry on the march in Meredith's name through the Mississippi Delta and to the state capital. The state committed to protecting the marchers. The Student Nonviolent Coordinating Committee (SNCC), the Southern Christian Leadership Conference (SCLC), the Mississippi Freedom Democratic Party (MFDP), the Congress of Racial Equality (CORE) and the Medical Committee for Human Rights (MCHR) took part, with Deacons for Defense and Justice from Louisiana providing armed protection. The different groups and leaders struggled over tactics and goals, but also cooperated in community organizing and voter registration. They registered more than 4,000 African Americans for voting in counties along the way. Some people marched for a short time, others stayed through all the events; some national leaders took part in intermittent fashion, as they already had commitments in other cities. In addition, labor leader Walter Reuther, along with his wife May, had traveled from Chicago to march and brought 10 buses full of union supporters.

During the latter days of the march, Stokely Carmichael, the new chairman of SNCC, introduced the idea of Black Power to a broad audience. Rev. Martin Luther King Jr. participated and continued to attract admiring crowds; his leadership and reputation brought numerous people out to see him, inspiring some to join the march. As the march headed south, the number of participants grew. Finally, an estimated 15,000 marchers, mostly black, entered the capital of Jackson on June 26, making it the largest civil rights march in the history of the state. The march served as a catalyst for continued community organizing and political growth over the following years among African Americans in the state. They have maintained a high rate of voting and participation in politics since then.

== History ==
Disappointed by the slow pace of change following passage of civil rights legislation in 1964 and 1965, James Meredith, noted for being the first African American to enroll at the University of Mississippi, decided to make a solo 'March Against Fear' from Memphis, Tennessee to Jackson, Mississippi, the state capital. He wanted to highlight continuing racial oppression in the Mississippi Delta, the heart of the black population in the state, during the 220-mile journey. Meredith wanted only black men on the march, and did not want a major media event featuring white participants.

On the second day of the march, a white sniper, later identified as Aubrey James Norvell, stepped out of a wooded area next to the road, shouted, "I only want Meredith", and shot Meredith three times with a 16-gauge shotgun loaded with birdshot shells. Meredith was wounded and fell to the road. People rushed to get an ambulance and took him to the hospital. Although he was not severely injured, Meredith was unable to continue the march as planned as he was hospitalized in Memphis to recover from his injuries. Norvell was later apprehended in Desoto County; he confessed to shooting Meredith and was sentenced the same day to five years in prison.

When they learned of the shooting, other civil rights leaders, including SCLC's Martin Luther King Jr., Allen Johnson, SNCC's Stokely Carmichael, Cleveland Sellers and Floyd McKissick, and Mississippi Freedom Democratic Party (MFDP), as well as the Medical Committee for Human Rights (MCHR) and other civil rights organizations, decided to continue the march in Meredith's name. The NAACP were originally involved but Roy Wilkins pulled out on learning that the armed Deacons for Defense and Justice were going to be protecting the march. Ordinary people, both black and white, came from across the South and all parts of the country to participate. The marchers slept on the ground outside or in large tents, and were fed mainly by local black communities. A press truck preceded them and the march was covered by national media. Along the way, members of the different civil rights groups argued and collaborated, struggling to achieve their sometimes overlapping and differing goals.

SNCC and MFDP worked to expand community organizing and achieve voter registration by reaching out to the black communities in the Delta. In most places, few blacks had registered to vote since passage of the Voting Rights Act in 1965, as they were still oppressed by fear and social and economic intimidation in the Jim Crow society. Along the way, the different civil rights groups struggled to reconcile their goals and to enhance the meaning of the march to promote black freedoms. It grew slowly and was embraced by black communities along the way, and by some sympathetic whites. Other whites expressed hostility, jeering and threatening, driving close to marchers. Although overt violence was generally limited, marchers from out of state were shocked and horrified by the virulence of hate expressed in some communities, particularly Philadelphia, where three civil rights workers had been murdered in 1964 and Canton.

Governor Paul Johnson, Jr. of Mississippi vowed to protect the marchers if they obeyed the law, but relations between the Highway State Police and marchers were sometimes tense. In some localities, mayors and local officials worked to keep relations peaceful. Local black communities and their churches provided food, housing and places of rest to marchers. They generally camped along the way, after returning to Memphis at the end of the first days.

On the early evening of Thursday, June 16, 1966, when the marchers arrived in Greenwood, Mississippi, and tried to set up camp at Stone Street Negro Elementary School, Carmichael was arrested for trespassing on public property. He was held for several hours by police before rejoining the marchers at a local park, where they had set up camp and were beginning a night-time rally. According to civil rights historian David Garrow, an angry Carmichael took the speaker's platform, delivering his famous "Black Power" speech, arguing that blacks had to build their own political and economic power to attain independence. He used this opportunity to gain a national audience through the media to hear his speech.

King, who had flown to Chicago on Wednesday to help organize the Open Housing Movement marches in the city, returned to Mississippi on Friday. He found that some of the Civil Rights Movements' internal divisions between the old guard and new guard had gone public. Marchers called out SNCC's "Black Power" slogan, as well as SCLC's "Freedom Now!"

In Canton, Mississippi, on June 23, after marchers tried to erect tents on the grounds of McNeal Elementary School, they were pressed and tear-gassed by the Mississippi Highway Patrol, which was joined by other police agencies. This contradicted the governor's commitment to protect them. Leaders felt the violence took place because President Lyndon B. Johnson had not offered federal forces to protect them following the violence in Philadelphia. Before that, while relations were often tense, the police had mostly respected the marchers. Several marchers were wounded in the Canton attack, one severely. Human Rights Medical Committee members conducted a house-to-house search that night looking for wounded marchers. The marchers sought refuge at Holy Child Jesus Catholic mission. There the Franciscan sisters extended their help and hospitality to the marchers, especially to the wounded. The following night the marchers returned to stay on the grounds of McNeal School without incident, as they did not attempt to erect tents.

After a short hospital treatment, Meredith was released. He planned to rejoin the march, then withdrew for a time, as he had not intended it to be such a large media event. He rejoined the March on June 25, the day before it arrived in Jackson and walked in the front line next to Martin Luther King Jr. and other leaders.

The march stopped at Tougaloo College, a historically black college, before entering Jackson. Marchers could rest and get food and showers. Many more people joined the march at that point; national leaders returned to it from commitments in other parts of the country. The growing crowd was entertained by James Brown, Dick Gregory, Sammy Davis Jr., Burt Lancaster and Marlon Brando.

The next day, June 26, marchers entered the city of Jackson from several different streams and were estimated to number 15,000 strong, the largest civil rights march in Mississippi history. They were warmly welcomed in the black neighborhoods and by some whites. However, many whites jeered and threatened the marchers; others simply stayed indoors. The Highway Police and other forces were out in number, as the city and state had vowed to protect the marchers after the attacks in Philadelphia and Canton. As a result of negotiations with authorities, the marchers gathered at the back of the state capitol to hear speeches, sing protest and celebration songs, and celebrate their achievements.

In total, the march expressed "both the depths of black grievances and the height of black possibilities," and it had to do with "oppressed people controlling their own destiny."

== Legacy and honors ==
- The march "defied Jim Crow's culture of intimidation" by the very act of blacks asserting themselves through the different communities, celebrating their identities, and organizing.
- In the counties along the route, 4,077 African Americans registered to vote, many for the first time. Federal examiners registered 1,422 and county clerks did the rest.
- Later black veterans of the Mississippi Movement noted that the march had longstanding political and cultural effects, serving to galvanize community organizing among blacks in the state.
- In 1967 Jack R. Thornell won the annual Pulitzer Prize for Photography for his photograph of James Meredith struggling on the road in Mississippi after being shot.

== Bibliography ==
- Goudsouzian, Aram. Down to the Crossroads: Civil Rights, Black Power, and the Meredith March Against Fear. Farrar, Straus, and Giroux. 2014.
