= James Meredith =

American civil rights activist (born 1933)

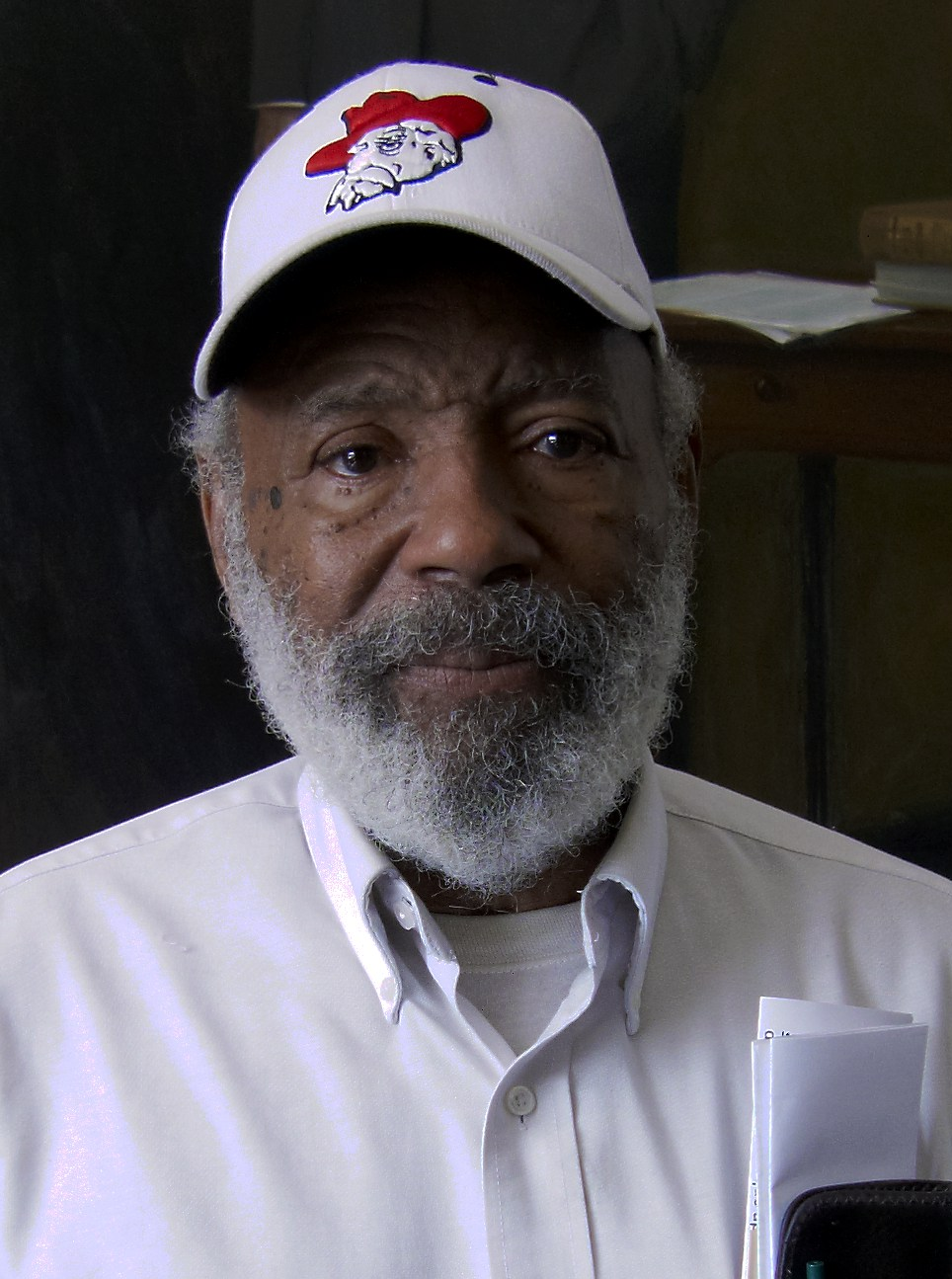
- Meredith in 2010
- Born: James Howard Meredith; June 25, 1933 (age 93); Kosciusko, Mississippi, U.S.
- Education: Jackson State University; University of Mississippi (BA); Columbia Law School (LLB)
- Known for: First black student at the University of Mississippi
- Political party: Republican
- Spouses: Mary June Wiggins (m. 1956; died 1979) Judy Alsobrooks (m. 1982)
- Children: 4
- Military career
- Allegiance: United States
- Branch: United States Air Force
- Service years: 1951–1960
- Rank: Staff sergeant

James Howard Meredith (born June 25, 1933) is an American civil rights activist, writer, political adviser, and United States Air Force veteran who became, in 1962, the first African-American student admitted to the racially segregated University of Mississippi after the intervention of the federal government (an event that was a flashpoint in the civil rights movement). Inspired by President John F. Kennedy's inaugural address, Meredith decided to exercise his constitutional rights and apply to the University of Mississippi. His goal was to put pressure on the Kennedy administration to enforce civil rights for African Americans. The admission of Meredith ignited the Ole Miss riot of 1962 where Meredith's life was threatened and 31,000 American servicemen were required to quell the violence – the largest ever invocation of the Insurrection Act of 1807.

In 1966, Meredith planned a solo 220-mile (350-kilometer) March Against Fear from Memphis, Tennessee, to Jackson, Mississippi; he wanted to highlight continuing racism in the South and encourage voter registration after passage of the Voting Rights Act of 1965. He did not want major civil rights organizations involved. The second day, he was shot by a white gunman and suffered numerous wounds. Leaders of major organizations vowed to complete the march in his name after he was taken to the hospital. While Meredith was recovering, more people from across the country became involved as marchers. He rejoined the march and when Meredith and other leaders entered Jackson on June 26, they were leading an estimated 15,000 marchers, in what was the largest civil rights march in Mississippi. During the march, more than 4,000 African Americans registered to vote, and it was a catalyst to continued community organizing and additional registration.

In 2002 and again in 2012, the University of Mississippi led year-long series of events to celebrate the 40th and 50th anniversaries of Meredith's integration of the institution. He was among numerous speakers invited to the campus, where a statue of him commemorates his role. The Lyceum-The Circle Historic District at the center of the campus has been designated as a National Historic Landmark for these events.

== Early life and education ==
Meredith was born in 1933 in Kosciusko, Mississippi, the son of Roxie (Patterson) and Moses Meredith. He is of African-American, English Canadian, Scots and Choctaw heritage. His family nickname was "J-Boy". European traders intermarried with some Choctaw during the colonial period. In the 1830s, thousands of Choctaw chose to stay in Mississippi and become United States citizens when most of the tribe left their traditional homeland for Indian Territory during the federally imposed removal. Those in the state had unions with European Americans and African Americans (some of whom were enslaved), adding to the multi-racial population in the developing territory.

Meredith completed 11th grade at Attala County Training School (which was segregated as "white" and "colored" under the state's Jim Crow laws) and completed 12th grade at Gibbs High School in St. Petersburg, Florida. He graduated from high school in 1951. Then, Meredith enlisted in the United States Air Force. He served from 1951 to 1960.

Afterward Meredith attended Jackson State University for two years, achieving good grades.

== University of Mississippi ==
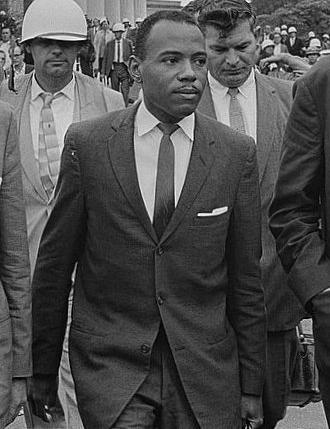
Meredith in 1962

=== Challenge to the University ===
In 1961, inspired the day before by U.S. President John F. Kennedy, Meredith started to apply to the University of Mississippi, intending to insist on his civil rights to attend the state-funded university. It still admitted only white students under the state's culture of racial segregation, although the U.S. Supreme Court had ruled in Brown v. Board of Education (1954) that segregation of public schools was unconstitutional, as they are supported by all the taxpayers.

Meredith wrote in his application that he wanted admission for his country, race, family, and himself. He said,

Nobody handpicked me...I believed, and believe now, that I have a Divine Responsibility... I am familiar with the probable difficulties involved in such a move as I am undertaking and I am fully prepared to pursue it all the way to a degree from the University of Mississippi.

He was twice denied admission. During this time, he was advised by Medgar Evers, who was head of the state chapter of the National Association for the Advancement of Colored People (NAACP).

On May 31, 1961, Meredith, with backing of the NAACP Legal Defense and Educational Fund, filed suit in the U.S. District Court for the Southern District of Mississippi, alleging that the university had rejected him only because of his race, as he had a highly successful record of military service and academic courses. Constance Baker Motley represented Meredith. The case went through many hearings, after which the United States Court of Appeals for the Fifth Circuit ruled that Meredith had the right to be admitted to the state school. The state appealed to the U.S. Supreme Court, which supported the ruling of the appeals court.

On September 13, 1962, the District Court entered an injunction directing the members of the Board of Trustees and the officials of the university to register Meredith. The Democratic Governor of Mississippi, Ross Barnett, declared "no school will be integrated in Mississippi while I am your governor". The state legislature quickly created a plan. They passed a law that denied admission to any person "who has a crime of moral turpitude against him" or who had been convicted of any felony offense or not pardoned. The same day it became law, Meredith was accused and convicted of "false voter registration," in absentia, in Jackson County. The conviction against Meredith was trumped up: Meredith both owned land in northern Mississippi and was registered to vote in Jackson, where he lived. "Later the clerk testified that Meredith was qualified to register and vote in Jackson [where he was registered]." On September 20, the federal government obtained an injunction against enforcement of this Act and of the two state court decrees that had barred Meredith's registration. That day Meredith was rebuffed again by Governor Barnett in his efforts to gain admission, though university officials were prepared to admit him. On September 25, Meredith attempted to register again, but Governor Barnett blocked Meredith's entry to the College Board office. On September 28, the Court of Appeals, en banc and after a hearing, found the Governor in civil contempt and ordered that he be arrested and pay a fine of $10,000 for each day that he kept up the refusal, unless he complied by October 2. On September 29, Lieutenant Governor Paul B. Johnson Jr. (elected Governor on November 5, 1963) was also found in contempt by a panel of the court, and a similar order was entered against him, with a fine of $5,000 a day.

Attorney General Robert F. Kennedy had a series of phone calls with Governor Barnett between September 27 to October 1. Barnett reluctantly agreed to let Meredith enroll in the university, but secretly bargained with Kennedy on a plan which would allow him to save face.

Barnett committed to maintain civil order. Robert Kennedy ordered 127 U.S. Marshals as well as 316 deputized U.S. Border Patrol and 97 Federal Bureau of Prisons officers to accompany Meredith during his arrival and registration. On September 29, President Kennedy issued a proclamation commanding all persons engaged in the obstruction of the laws and the orders of the courts to "cease and desist therefrom and to disperse and retire peaceably forthwith", citing his authority under 10 U.S.C. § 332, § 333, and § 334 to use the militia or the armed forces to suppress any insurrection, domestic violence, unlawful combination, or conspiracy.

=== Rioting at the University ===
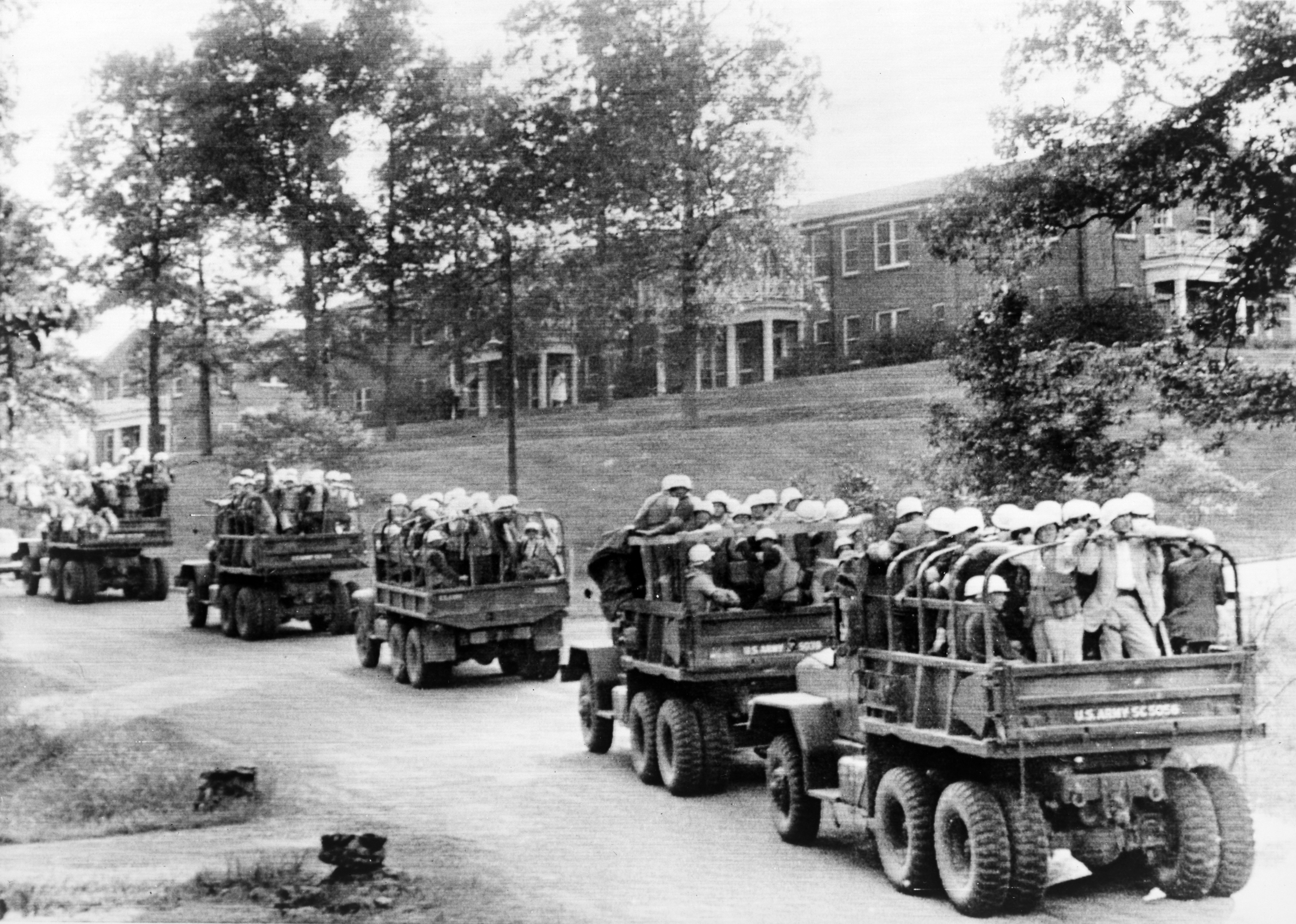
U.S. Army trucks loaded with steel-helmeted federal agents roll across the University of Mississippi campus on October 3, 1962.

On September 29, Governor Barnett made a spirited speech at halftime of the Ole Miss-Kentucky football game, firing up the crowd and encouraging people to block Meredith's entry to the university. Barnett said, in part, "I love Mississippi! I love her people, our customs ... I love and I respect our heritage." The Ole Miss Band waved a large Confederate flag, and the stands were full of students waving Confederate flags. President Kennedy sent federal marshals to Mississippi.

On Sunday, September 30, 1962, Governor Barnett called the Attorney General, Robert Kennedy, to try to get him to postpone Meredith's admission to the university. The Attorney General refused. Meredith, accompanied by Mississippi Highway Patrol and 500 federal marshals, moved into his dorm room. Outside the Lyceum building, where Meredith was due to register for classes the next day, a crowd of hostile students formed near the marshals who were protecting the building. At 7:30 p.m., the crowd broke into a riot. The crowd, which numbered 3000, threw bottles and rocks, and the marshals tear-gassed them. More than 300 people were injured, and two people were killed.

=== Enrollment ===
The day after the riots, on October 1, 1962, after federal and state forces took control, Meredith became the first African-American student to enroll at the University of Mississippi. Meredith's admission is regarded as a pivotal moment in the history of civil rights in the United States.

Many students harassed Meredith during his two semesters on campus, but others accepted him. According to first-person accounts, students living in Meredith's dorm bounced basketballs on the floor just above his room through all hours of the night. Other students ostracized him: when Meredith walked into the cafeteria for meals, the students eating would turn their backs. If Meredith sat at a table with other students, all of whom were white, the students would immediately get up and go to another table. He persisted through harassment and extreme isolation to graduate on August 18, 1963, with a degree in political science.

== Education and activism ==
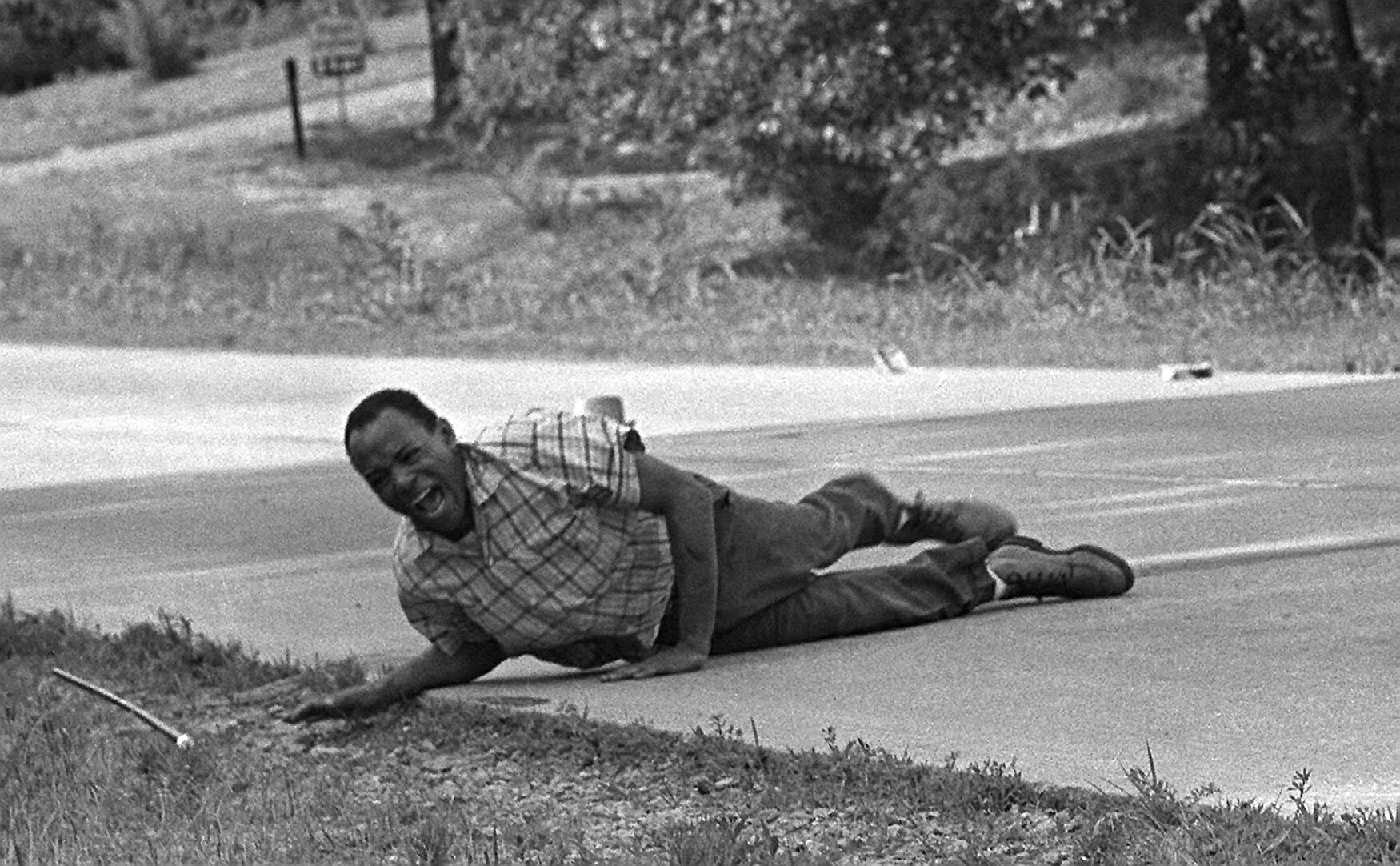
James Meredith wounded after being shot on June 7, 1966

Meredith continued his education, focusing on political science, at the University of Ibadan in Nigeria. He returned to the United States in 1965. He attended law school through a scholarship at Columbia University and earned an LL.B (law degree) in 1968.

In 1966, Meredith organized and led a solo, personal March Against Fear for 220 miles from Memphis, Tennessee, to Jackson, Mississippi, beginning on June 6, 1966. Inviting only black men to join him, he wanted to highlight continuing racial oppression in the Mississippi Delta, as well as to encourage blacks to register and vote following passage of the federal Voting Rights Act of 1965, which authorized federal oversight and enforcement of rights. Governor Paul Johnson promised to allow the march and provide State Highway Police protection. Meredith wanted blacks in Mississippi to overcome fear of violence.

Despite a police presence, on the second day, Meredith was shot and wounded by Aubrey James Norvell, a white unemployed hardware clerk whose motives were never determined, and who pleaded guilty at trial. Meredith was quickly taken to a hospital. Leaders of major organizations rallied at the news and vowed to complete the march in Meredith's name. They struggled to reconcile differing goals, but succeeded in attracting more than 10,000 marchers from local towns and across the country by the end.

Norvell pleaded guilty to battery and assault with intent to kill and was sentenced to five years in prison. He was released after 18 months, vowing to "live a normal life".

Meredith suffered from superficial wounds to his neck, legs, head, and right side. He recovered from his wounds, and rejoined the march before it reached Jackson on June 26, when 15,000 marchers entered the city in what had become the largest civil rights march in state history. During the march, more than 4,000 black Mississippians registered to vote. Continued community organizing was catalyzed by these events, and African Americans began to enter the political system again.

== Political career ==
In 1967, while living and studying in New York, Meredith decided to run as a Republican against incumbent Adam Clayton Powell Jr., a multi-term Democrat, in a special election for the Congressional seat in Harlem. He withdrew from the race and Powell was re-elected. Meredith said later of his campaign, "The Republican Party [of New York] made me an offer: full support in every way, everything." He had full access to top New York Republicans.

After returning to Mississippi in 1972, Meredith entered the Republican primary for the U.S. Senate seat of Democrat James Eastland, who had been the incumbent for 29 years in what had operated as a one-party state. Following provisions of a new state constitution in 1890 that made voter registration extremely difficult, African Americans had been effectively disenfranchised and the Republican Party had been crippled. Meredith conceded that he had little chance of winning unless Governor George Wallace of Alabama entered the presidential race and split the white vote. As it happened, many Republicans in Mississippi were not enthusiastic about the prospect of Meredith as their nominee, and Gil Carmichael, a businessman from Meridian, was recruited to run against him. Meredith received only 21% of the primary vote against Carmichael.

An active Republican, Meredith served from 1989 to 1991 as a domestic adviser on the staff of United States Senator Jesse Helms. Faced with criticism from the civil rights community for working for the avowed segregationist, Meredith said that he had applied to every member of the Senate and House offering his services, and only Helms' office responded. He also wanted a chance to do research at the Library of Congress.

In 2002, officials at the University of Mississippi celebrated the 40th anniversary of Meredith's historic admission and integration of the institution with a year-long series of events. Of the celebration, Meredith said,

It was an embarrassment for me to be there, and for somebody to celebrate it, oh my God. I want to go down in history, and have a bunch of things named after me, but believe me that ain't it.

He said he had achieved his main goal at the time by getting the federal government to enforce his rights as a citizen. He saw his actions as "an assault on white supremacy". In 2003, he was far more proud that his son Joseph Meredith graduated as the top doctoral student at the university's graduate business school.

== Legacy and honors ==
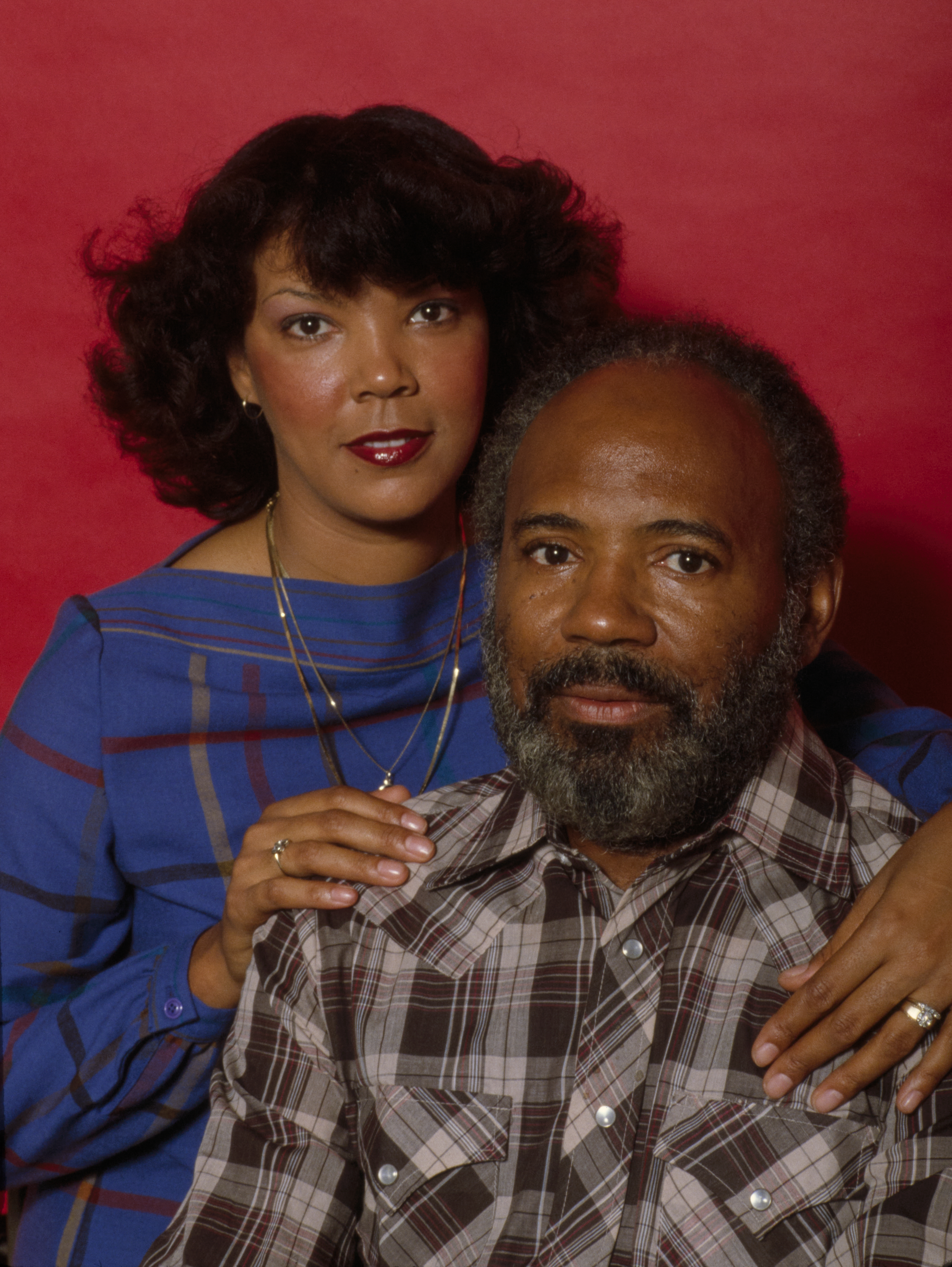
Meredith and Judy Alsobrooks in 1982

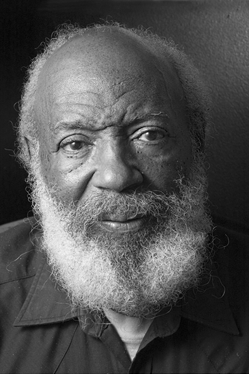
Meredith in 2007

- In 2002, the University of Mississippi honored the 40th anniversary of Meredith's admission with numerous events.
- In 2006, a statue of him was dedicated on campus in his honor.
- In 2012, the university commemorated the 50th anniversary of the historic admission, featuring a range of speakers, artists, lectures and events during the year.
- That year Meredith received the Harvard Graduate School of Education 'Medal for Education Impact' and was the school's convocation speaker. Meredith said it was the first award in 50 years he had accepted.

== Cultural depictions ==
In 2011 miniseries The Kennedys, Meredith was portrayed by Matthew G. Brown in episode five of the series Life Sentences.

== Political viewpoint ==
A highly independent man, Meredith has identified as an individual American citizen who demanded and received the constitutional rights held by any American, not as a participant in the Civil Rights Movement. There have been tensions between him and leaders of major organizations of the movement. When interviewed in 2002, the 40th anniversary of his enrollment at University of Mississippi, Meredith said, "Nothing could be more insulting to me than the concept of civil rights. It means perpetual second-class citizenship for me and my kind."

Meredith was a supporter of the unsuccessful 1967 gubernatorial bid of ex-Mississippi Governor (and avowed segregationist) Ross Barnett, who had been responsible for Meredith's not being allowed at the University of Mississippi, as well as the 1991 gubernatorial campaign of Louisiana State Representative and ex-Klansman David Duke. On these endorsements, Meredith wrote in a statement intended for his unborn grandchildren, "I prefer bigotry to be out in the open where I can confront it."

In a 2002 interview with CNN, Meredith said of his efforts to integrate Ole Miss, "I was engaged in a war. I considered myself engaged in a war from Day One. And my objective was to force the federal government — the Kennedy administration at that time — into a position where they would have to use the United States military force to enforce my rights as a citizen."

== Personal life ==
On March 14, 1956, Meredith married Mary June Wiggins. She later worked as a high school English teacher. They had three sons, James, John and Joseph Howard Meredith. Mary June Meredith died of heart failure in December 1979.

In 1982, Meredith married Judy Alsobrooks in Gary, Indiana. She had one son, Kip Naylor, from a previous marriage. Jessica Howard Meredith was born to the couple. The couple live in Jackson, Mississippi.

== Works ==
- In 1966, his memoir, Three Years in Mississippi, was published by the Indiana University Press.
- He has self-published several books on politics and society.

== See also ==
- List of African-American pioneers in desegregation of higher education
- List of civil rights leaders
- School integration in the United States

== Bibliography ==
- Branch, Taylor (1988). Parting the Waters : America in the King Years, 1954–63. New York: Simon and Schuster. ISBN 978-0-671-68742-7.
- Meredith, James (1966). Three Years in Mississippi. Bloomington: Indiana University Press.
- Meredith, James (1995). Mississippi: A Volume of Eleven Books. Jackson, MS: Meredith Publishing.
