= United Papermakers and Paperworkers =

The United Papermakers and Paperworkers (UPP) was a labor union representing workers involved in manufacturing paper in the United States and Canada.

The union was established on March 6, 1957, when the International Brotherhood of Paper Makers merged with the United Paperworkers of America. Like both its predecessors, it was chartered by the AFL–CIO. On formation, it had 130,000 members.

In 1959, the American Wire Weavers' Protective Association merged into the UPP, but it split away again in 1964. In 1972, the union merged with the International Brotherhood of Pulp, Sulphite, and Paper Mill Workers, to form the United Paperworkers' International Union.

== Presidents ==
1957: Paul L. Phillips
1968: Harry Sayre
