= Jonesboro, Louisiana =

- Town & Parish seat
- Town of Jonesboro
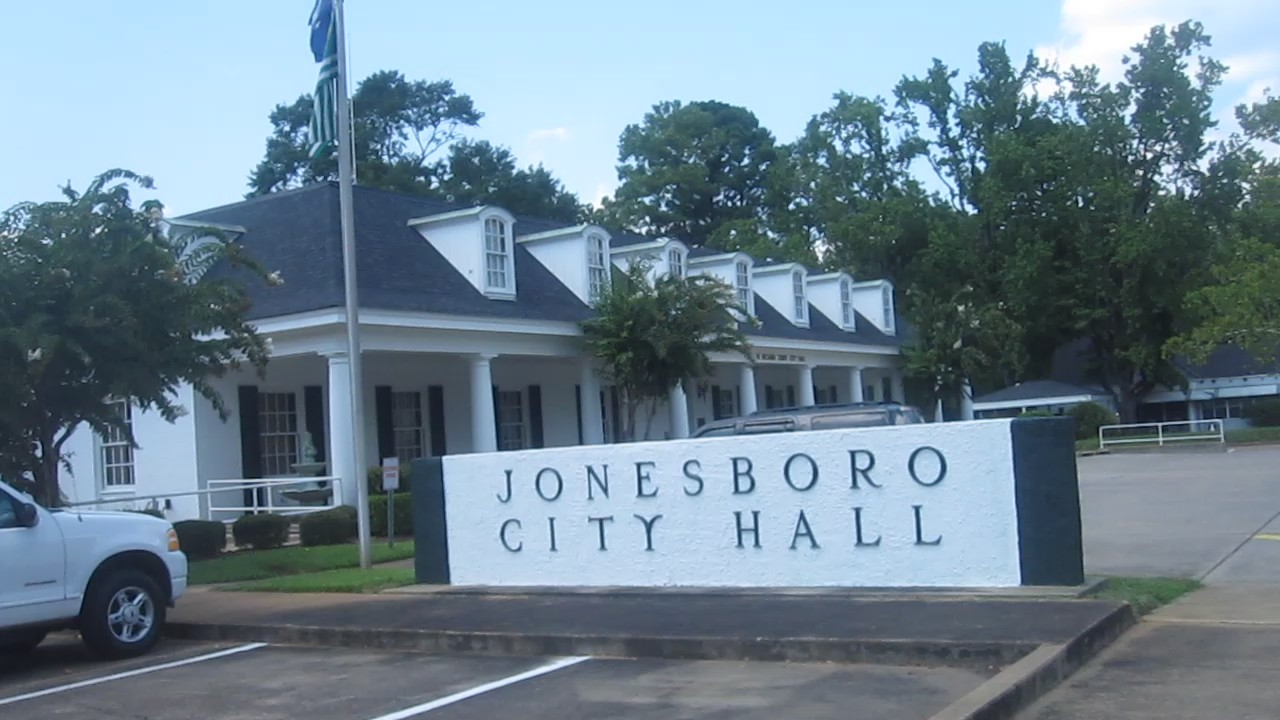
- Jonesboro City Hall

- Location of Jonesboro in Jackson Parish, Louisiana

- Location within Louisiana Location within the United States
- Coordinates: 32°14′38″N 92°42′47″W
- Country: United States
- State: Louisiana
- Parish: Jackson

Government
  - Mayor: James "Spike" Harris

Area
  - Total: 4.90 sq mi (12.70 km^{2})
  - Land: 4.85 sq mi (12.55 km^{2})
  - Water: 0.058 sq mi (0.15 km^{2})
- Elevation: 236 ft (72 m)

Population (2020)
  - Total: 4,106
  - Density: 847.2/sq mi (327.09/km^{2})
- Time zone: UTC-6 (CST)
  - Summer (DST): UTC-5 (CDT)
- ZIP Code: 71251
- Area code: 318
- FIPS code: 22-38670
- GNIS feature ID: 2405918
- Website: www.jonesborola.net

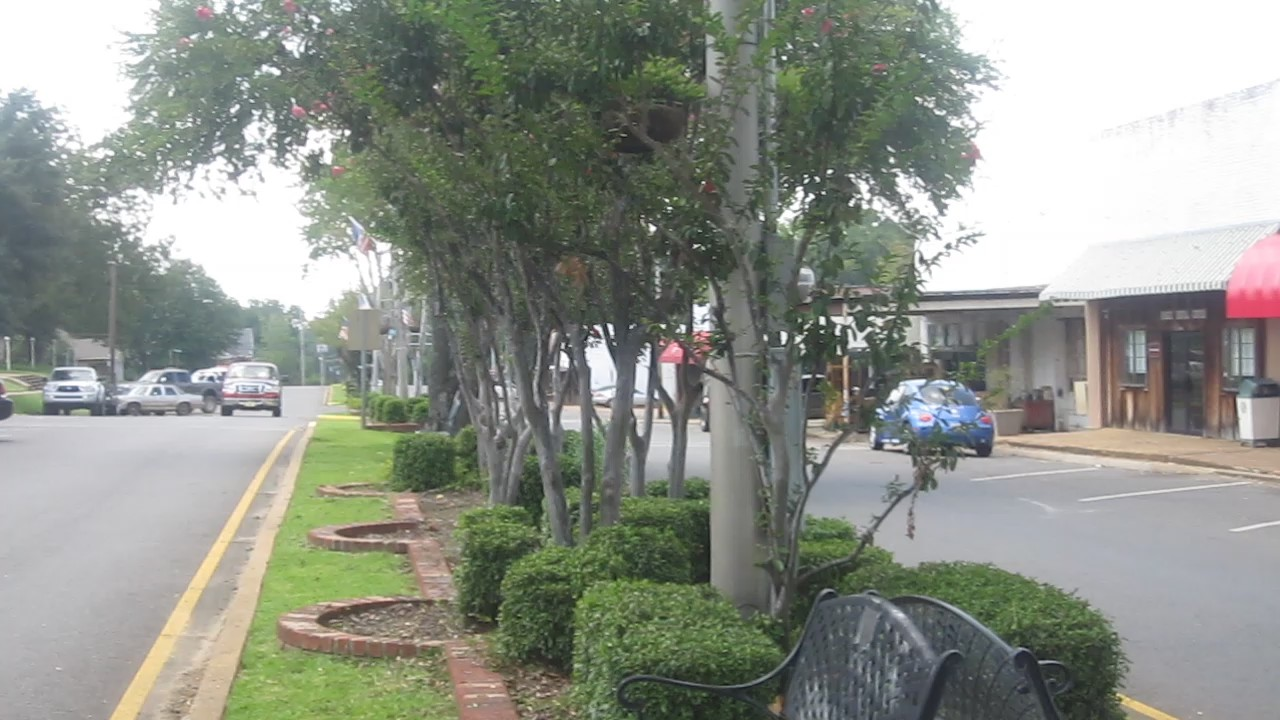
Jimmie Davis Boulevard extends through downtown.

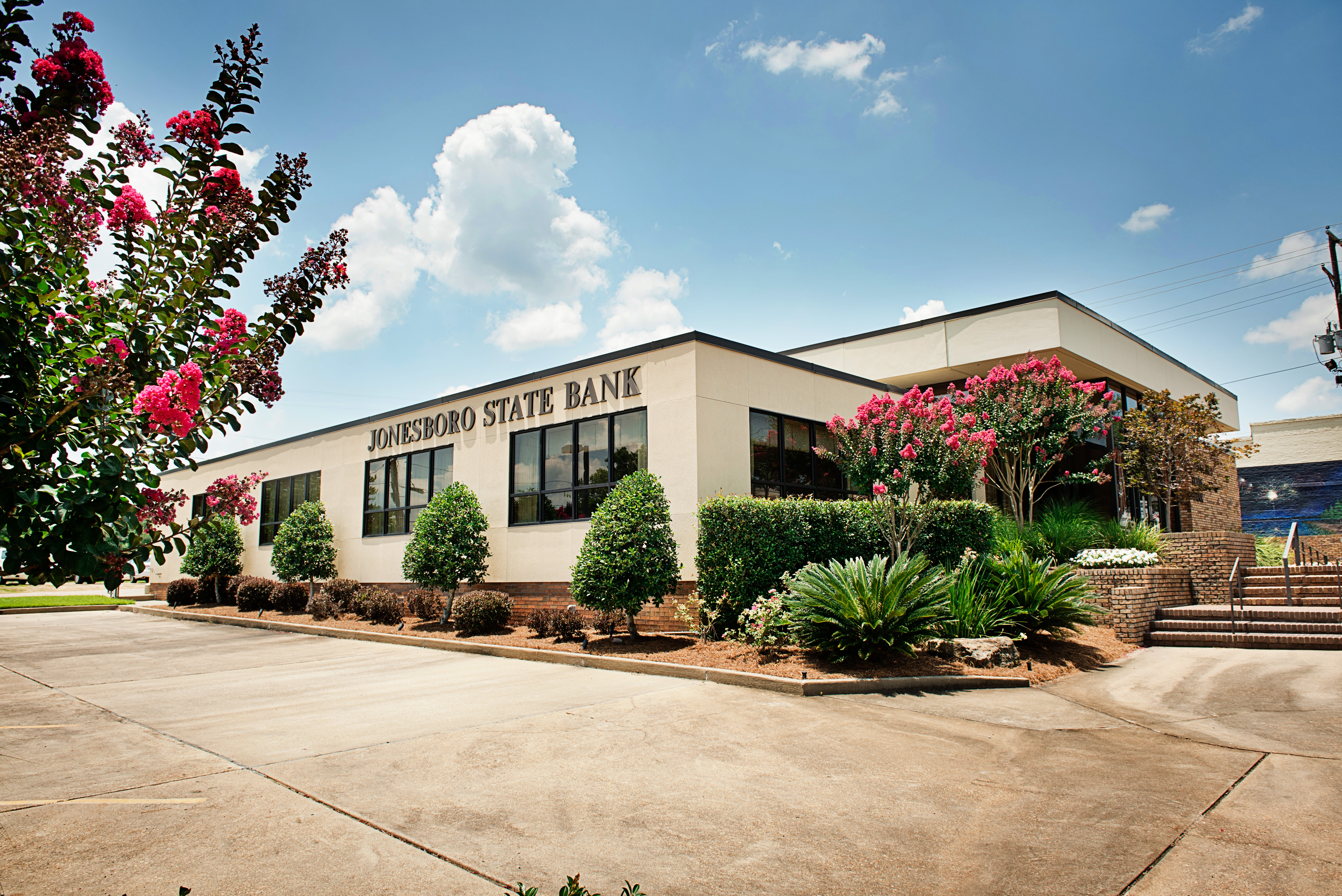
Jonesboro State Bank is located downtown.

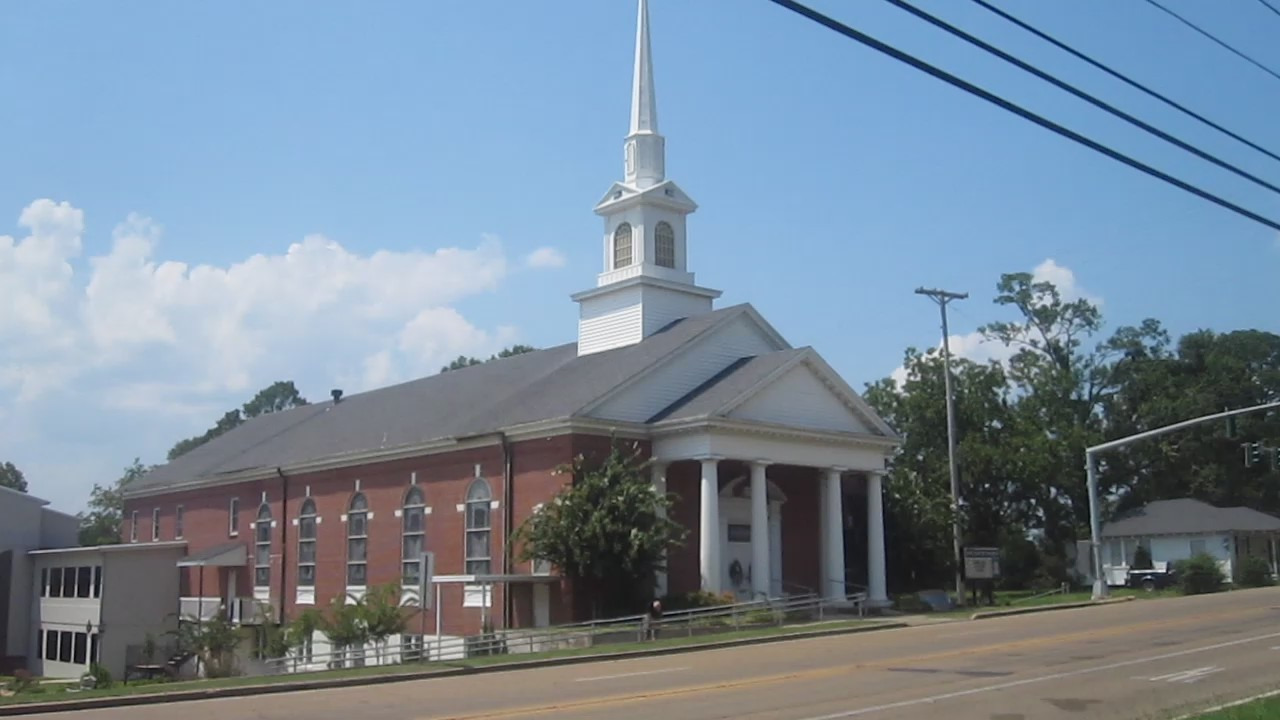
The First Baptist Church of Jonesboro is located at the intersection of Jimmie Davis Boulevard and South Cooper Avenue.

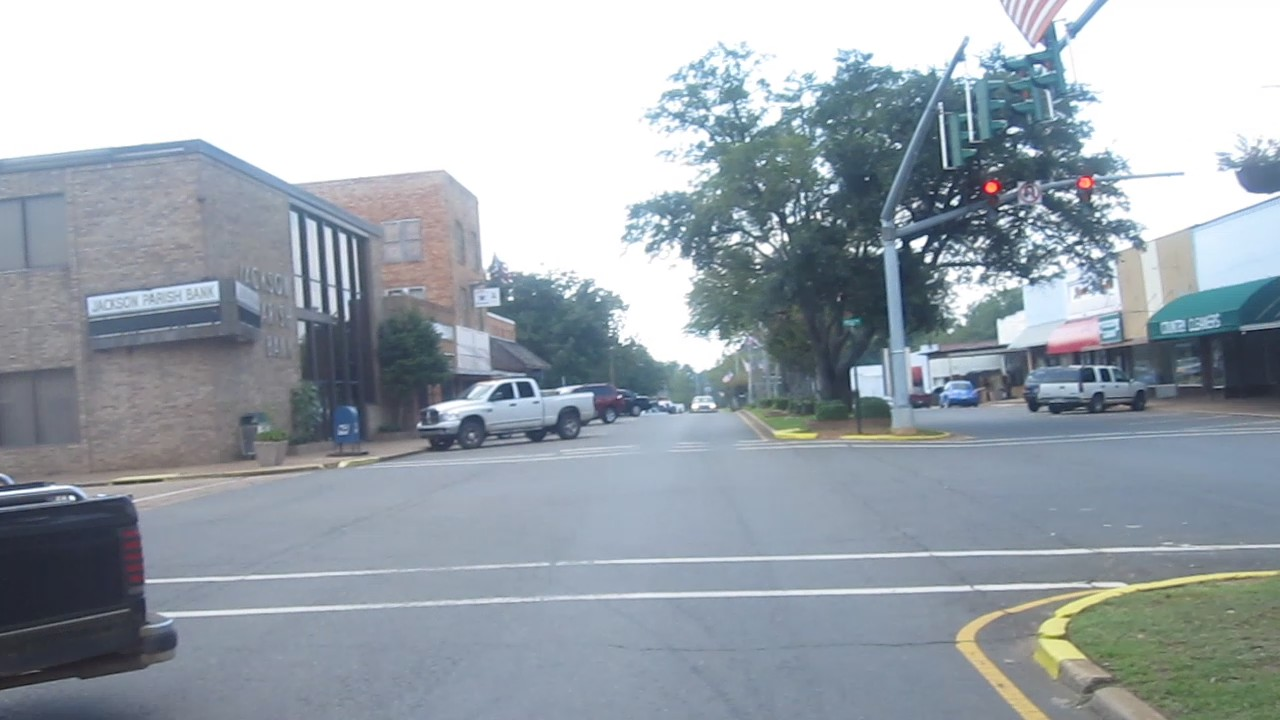
Another view of downtown Jonesboro on the Jimmie Davis Boulevard facing east

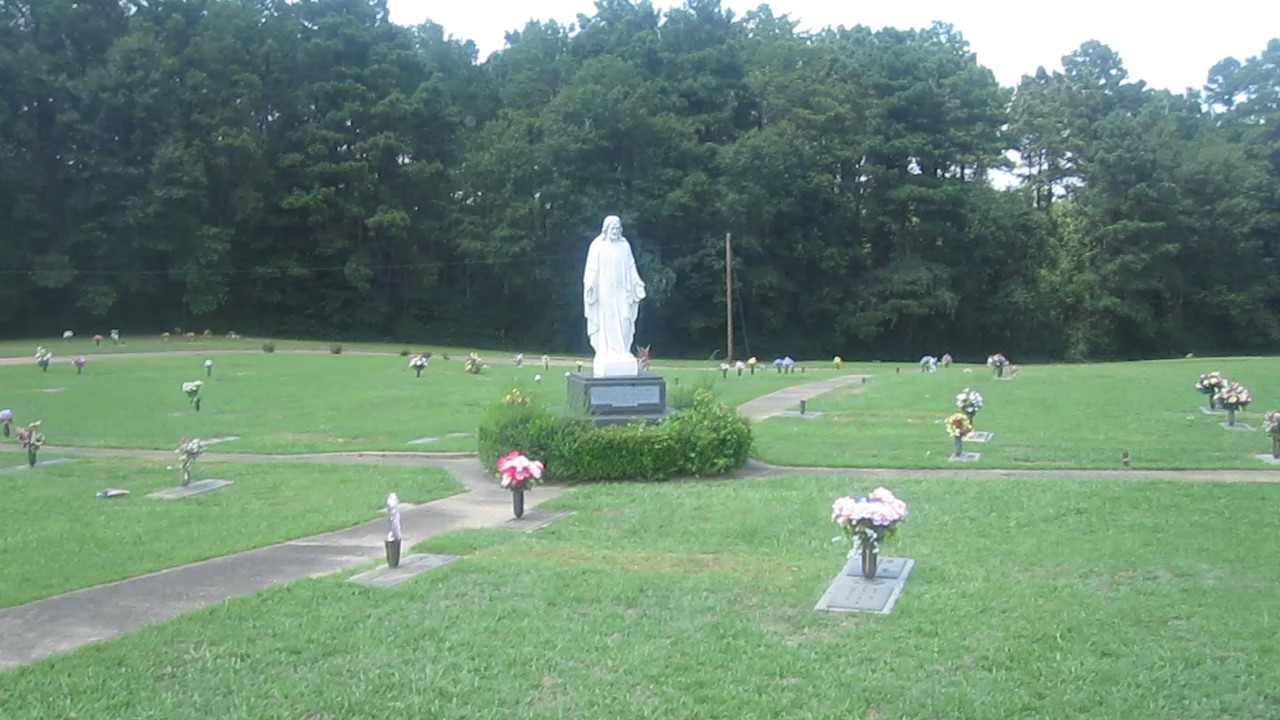
Garden of Memories is located on the Castor Highway outside Jonesboro.

Jonesboro (/ˈdʒoʊnzbʌrə/) is a town in and the parish seat of Jackson Parish in the northern portion of the U.S. state of Louisiana. The population was 4,106 in 2020.

== History ==
Founded on January 10, 1860, by Joseph Jones and his wife, Sarah Pankey Jones, as a small family farm, Jonesboro is now a small industrial mill town. Originally founded as "Macedonia," the small town's name changed to Jonesboro on January 16, 1901, after the United States Post Office Department approved the change and became the seat of government for Jackson Parish on March 15, 1911, following a parish-wide referendum. Jonesboro remains the parish's agricultural, industrial, economic, and governmental center.

During the Civil Rights Movement of the 1960s, whites violently resisted African-American efforts to gain their constitutional rights as citizens, even after the passage of the Civil Rights Act of 1964. The Ku Klux Klan, which was active in the area, conducted what was called a "reign of terror" in 1964, including harassment of activists, "the burning of crosses on the lawns of African-American voters," murder, and destroying five black churches by fire, as well as their Masonic hall, and a Baptist center.

In November 1964, Earnest "Chilly Willy" Thomas and Frederick Douglass Kirkpatrick (the latter ordained that year as a minister of the Church of God in Christ), founded the Deacons for Defense and Justice in Jonesboro. It was an armed self-defense group, largely made up of men who were World War II and Korean War veterans. At night, they conducted regular patrols of the city's black community which occupied an area known as "the Quarters". They protected civil rights activists and their families during and outside demonstrations. At the request of activists in Bogalusa, another mill town where blacks were under pressure from violent whites, Thomas and Kirkpatrick helped found an affiliated chapter in that city. Ultimately there were 21 chapters in Louisiana, Mississippi, and Alabama, operating through 1968. In Jonesboro, the Deacons achieved some changes, such as integrating parks and a swimming pool. Activists achieved more after congressional passage of the Voting Rights Act of 1965 and their entry into politics.

== Geography ==
Jonesboro is in southwestern Jackson Parish. U.S. Route 167 passes through the town's northern and eastern sides, leading north 22 miles (35 km) to Ruston and south 23 miles (37 km) to Winnfield. Louisiana Highway 4 passes through the center of Jonesboro, leading east 17 miles (27 km) to Chatham and west 19 miles (31 km) to Lucky.

According to the United States Census Bureau, Jonesboro has an area of 4.9 square miles (12.7 km^{2}), of which 4.8 square miles (12.5 km^{2}) are land and 0.04 square miles (0.1 km^{2}), or 1.17%, are water. Jonesboro water bodies drain north to the Little Dugdemona River, which turns southwest and forms the southward-flowing Dugdemona River.

=== Climate ===
The climate in this area is characterized by hot, humid summers and generally mild to cool winters. According to the Köppen Climate Classification system, Jonesboro has a humid subtropical climate, abbreviated "Cfa" on climate maps.

== Demographics ==
Historical population
Census	Pop.	Note	%±
1910	1,134		—
1920	837		−26.2%
1930	1,949		132.9%
1940	2,639		35.4%
1950	3,097		17.4%
1960	3,848		24.2%
1970	5,072		31.8%
1980	5,061		−0.2%
1990	4,305		−14.9%
2000	3,914		−9.1%
2010	4,704		20.2%
2020	4,106		−12.7%
2025 (est.)	4,252	▲	3.6%
U.S. Decennial Census

=== 2020 census ===
As of the 2020 census, there were 4,106 people, 1,374 households, and 754 families residing in the town.

The median age was 36.4 years. 21.9% of residents were under the age of 18 and 17.5% were 65 years of age or older. For every 100 females there were 92.8 males, and for every 100 females age 18 and over there were 88.6 males age 18 and over.

98.8% of residents lived in urban areas, while 1.2% lived in rural areas.

Of all households, 33.3% had children under the age of 18 living in them. 27.0% were married-couple households, 21.6% were households with a male householder and no spouse or partner present, and 44.8% were households with a female householder and no spouse or partner present. About 36.0% of all households were made up of individuals, and 15.4% had someone living alone who was 65 years of age or older.

There were 1,756 housing units, of which 15.7% were vacant. The homeowner vacancy rate was 1.3% and the rental vacancy rate was 11.7%.

Jonesboro racial composition as of 2020
Race	Number	Percentage
White (non-Hispanic)	1,531	37.29%
Black or African American (non-Hispanic)	2,066	50.32%
Native American	3	0.07%
Asian	102	2.48%
Pacific Islander	2	0.05%
Other/Mixed	135	3.29%
Hispanic or Latino	268	6.5%

== Government ==
The city has a mayor-council form of government; all persons are elected. Independent Dr. James Spoke Harris was inaugurated on December 31, 2022. Democrat James E. Bradford was inaugurated on December 29, 2014.

The previous mayor, Leslie Cornell Thompson, was suspended from office in September 2013 after being convicted of malfeasance in office. As of 2013, Jonesboro had not had a budget since 2008. His wife, Yoshi Chambers Thompson, was initially appointed by the city council to succeed him as interim mayor. Her legitimacy was questioned by Kenneth David Folden, the fiscal administrator appointed by the state the day after Thompson's conviction to bring city finances back into order. Tammy Sheridan Lee, the Monroe city judge who administered the oath to Yoshi Thompson, has withdrawn the authorization. Louisiana Attorney General Buddy Caldwell is reviewing the legality of the situation.

Meanwhile, Judge James Cecil "Jimmy" Teat of the Louisiana 2nd Judicial District Court in Jonesboro ruled that Thompson had violated the conditions of his bond through continued interference in municipal business. Judge Teat ordered Thompson to be incarcerated in the Jackson Parish Correctional Center until his sentencing on the malfeasance charges.

A Democrat, Thompson had been elected mayor on October 2, 2010, with 824 vote (57.6 percent) to the Republican candidate, Freddie Brown's, 607 (42.4 percent).

On October 17, 2013, based on the conviction of malfeasance, Judge Teat sentenced Mayor Thompson to six years of hard labor, large fines, $51,000 in restitution to the city of Jonesboro, five years' suspended sentence, and five years of supervised probation. Thompson will remain incarcerated pending appeal.

In the runoff election for mayor held on December 8, 2018, Thompson unseated Bradford.

== Arts and culture ==
Jonesboro is the home of "Christmas Wonderland in the Pines", a local festival held annually. It begins the Saturday after Thanksgiving Day and continues through December.

Jonesboro also has a "Sunshine Festival" in the summer, featuring antique cars and tractors, food, and games.

== Infrastructure ==
=== Transportation ===
U.S. Highway 167 passes by Jackson, which is located twenty-four miles south of Ruston. SR 4 joins Highway 167 at Jonesboro, which is in the southwestern portion of Jackson Parish.

Immigration Detention

The Jackson Parish Correctional Center is an ICE detention facility located in Jonesboro. It is a medium security detention center with a capacity of 1,252.

== Education ==
The Jackson Parish School Board oversees the public school system within Jonesboro from a parish-level.

Zoned schools include:

- Jonesboro-Hodge Elementary School
- Jonesboro-Hodge Middle School
- Jonesboro-Hodge High School

The town is also home to the Louisiana Delta Community College Jonesboro campus, which offers courses in welding, business administration, and various general requirement courses.

== Notable people ==
- Rodney Alexander, Republican former U.S. Representative
- Marty Booker, NFL wide receiver
- Marvin T. Culpepper, member of the Louisiana House of Representatives from 1964 to 1968
- James Houston "Jimmie" Davis, was a Louisiana governor, and writer of the song "You Are My Sunshine".
- John Garlington, football linebacker in the National Football League
- Frederick Douglass Kirkpatrick, singer-songwriter, civil rights activist and co-founder of Deacons for Defense and Justice
- Randy Moffett, president of the University of Louisiana System from 2008 to 2012
- James P. Pope, former U.S. Senator from Idaho
- Jerry Robinson, NFL kick returner
- Addarren "Lil Snupe" Ross, Rapper from Jonesboro
