= International Brotherhood of Pulp, Sulphite, and Paper Mill Workers =

Labor union for the paper industry in North America

The International Brotherhood of Pulp, Sulphite, and Paper Mill Workers (IBPSPMW) was a labor union representing workers involved in making paper in the United States and Canada.

The union was founded on January 6, 1906, as a split from the International Brotherhood of Paper Makers. In 1909, it was chartered by the American Federation of Labor. By 1926, it had 10,000 members.

The union was affiliated to the AFL–CIO from 1955 and by 1957 it had grown to have 165,000 members. In 1958, it absorbed the United Wall Paper Craftsmen of North America. However, in 1964, many of its West Coast members left to form the Association of Western Pulp and Paper Workers. On 9 August, 1972, the union merged with the United Papermakers and Paperworkers, to form the United Paperworkers' International Union.

== President-Secretaries ==
1906: James F. FitzGerald
1909: John Malin
1917: John P. Burke
1965: William H. Burnell (acting from 1963)
1965: Joseph Tonelli
