= Savage Rapids Dam =

Coordinates: 42.42012°N 123.2295°W

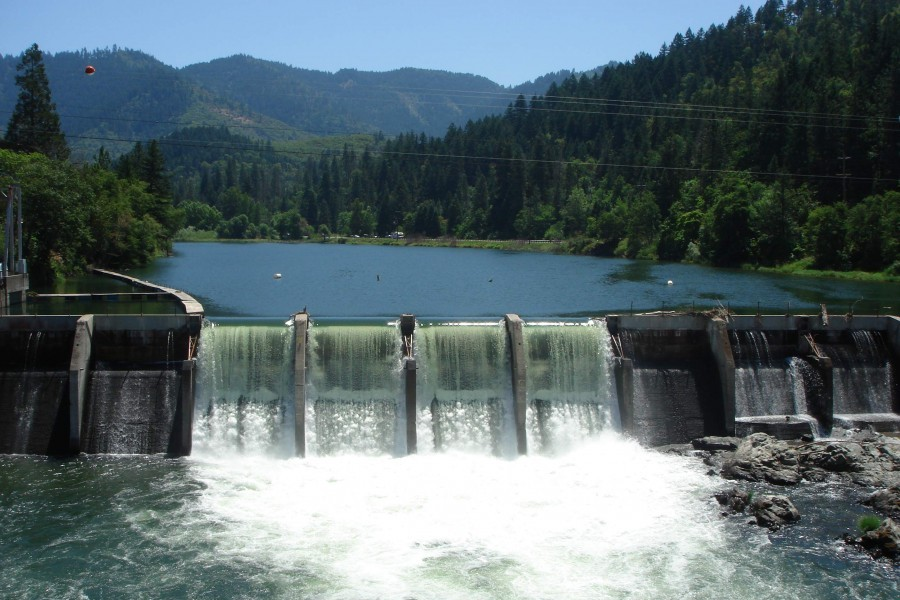
Savage Rapids Dam while in operation

Savage Rapids Dam was an approximately 39-foot-high (12 m), 500-foot-long (150 m) irrigation diversion dam spanning the mainstem of the Rogue River in Josephine County, Oregon. The dam was demolished and removed in 2009. Built in 1921 by the Grants Pass Irrigation District (GPID), the dam diverted water from the river to GPID's irrigation canals. Savage Rapids Dam did not fulfill other functions often associated with dams such as flood control, hydro-electric power, and managing inland waterways. The dam provided minor recreational benefits and provided habitat for certain migratory birds.

Because its facilities for accommodating migrating salmon did not meet current legal or practical standards, GPID had agreed to allow this dam to be demolished and replaced by pumps. GPID had entered into a U.S. Federal Court consent decree to this effect. Construction of the replacement irrigation pumps began in 2006, and these pumps began operating on May 11, 2009. The final dam demolition and removal was completed in October 2009. This project represented one of the largest dam removals ever undertaken in the United States, and it is expected to have significant and enduring positive impacts on salmon and steelhead populations on the Rogue River and the valuable sport and commercial salmon fisheries of Oregon.

== History ==
The Grants Pass Irrigation District was organized by water users in January 1917, and it then contained about 6,000 acres (24 km^{2}) of land. In 1920, a diversion dam design was adopted to provide for a direct diversion system with permanent pumping units at a site on the Rogue River about five miles (8 km) east of the town of Grants Pass, Oregon. The Savage Rapids Dam was dedicated November 5, 1921, and this marked the beginning of the operational history of the water district.

The Savage Rapids Dam and its related facilities were badly damaged by a flood in 1927. Emergency repairs were made at that time, but the lack of sufficient funds prevented satisfactory completion of the work. By 1949, the cost of maintenance had become prohibitive for the GPID, and soon the U.S. Bureau of Reclamation was asked to replace or repair significant portions of the facility using Federal funds.

Construction of a new buried pipeline under the river to replace the old suspension pipeline was completed during the winter of 1949-50. Savage Rapids Dam was rehabilitated from March 25, 1953, to February 22, 1955. Fish ladders on both the north and south sides of the river were upgraded in the late 1950s. Improvements to the current fish passage facilities at the dam were completed in 1978.

=== Path to removal agreement ===
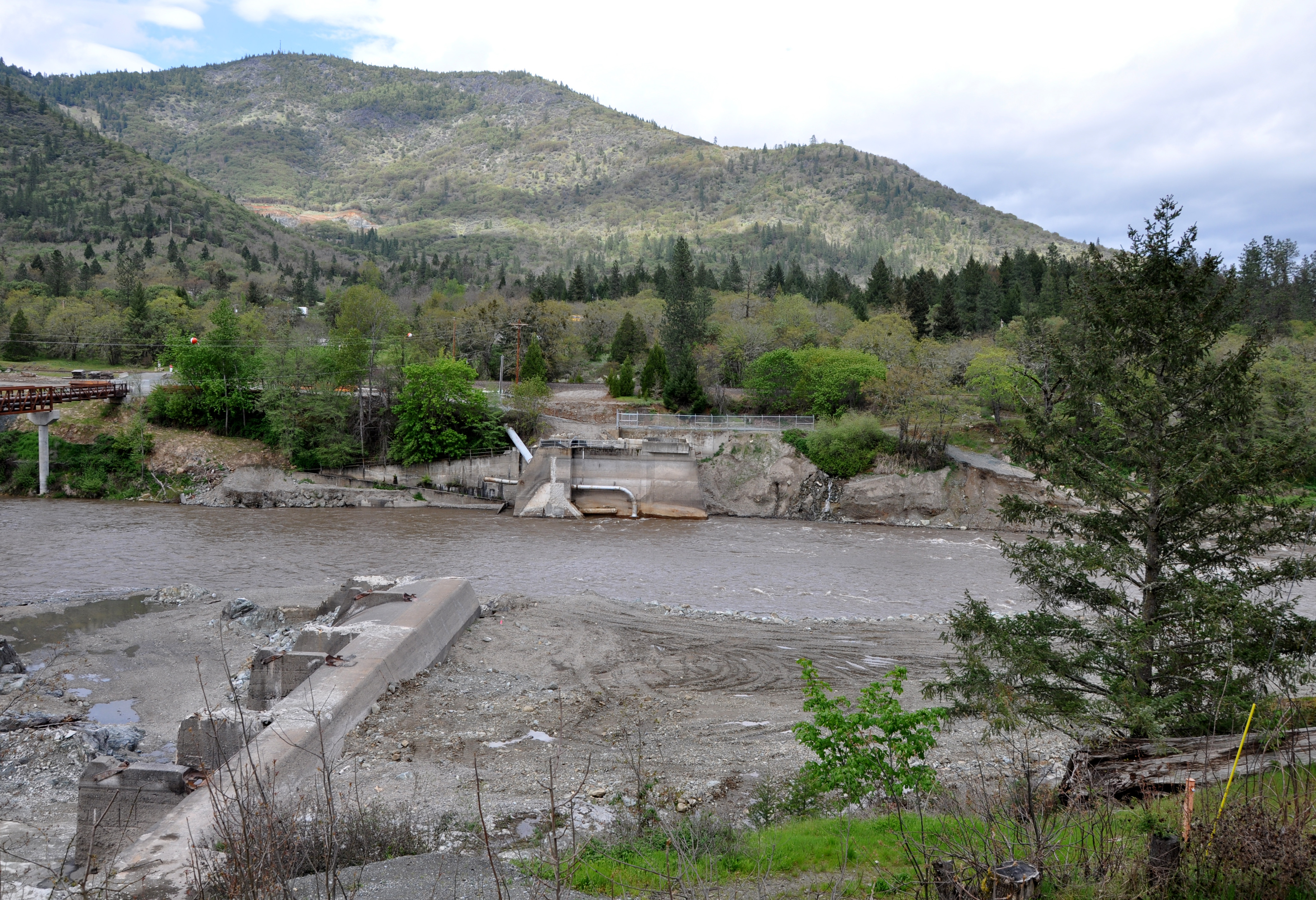
Remains of the Savage Rapids Dam

Although the dam removal agreement was widely hailed as a great success for all parties involved, the path to agreement took many years and included a great deal of conflict.

In 1988, the conservation, science, and sport fishing groups WaterWatch, the American Fisheries Society, and the Rogue Flyfishers protested the GPID’s state-level application for a water right to divert additional water from the Rogue River, and commenced negotiations with the GPID over water use and fish passage.

In 1990, WaterWatch reached an agreement with the GPID and the state on a temporary water rights permit, conditional upon completion of a study on water conservation alternatives and fish passage alternatives for the dam. Significantly, this study evaluated dam removal as an alternative.

Completed in 1994, the study recommended the dam's removal. The "Oregon Water Resources Commission" then ordered an extension of the GPID’s temporary water right permit on three conditions: The district was required to replace the dam with pumps, to remove the dam, and to reduce its irrigation water diversion from the river.

However, from 1995 through 2000, the GPID board of directors reneged on its commitment to dam removal and instead waged a political and legal battle to keep the dam. This led to litigation in state and federal courts.

In 1997, the National Marine Fisheries Service (NMFS) listed the Rogue coho salmon population as threatened under the Federal Endangered Species Act and determined that the Savage Rapids Dam caused significant harm to coho salmon. In 1998, after the GPID failed to submit a habitat conservation plan for the dam, as required under the ESA, NMFS sued the District.

WaterWatch and the State of Oregon were successful in winning a state contested case, which resulted in the cancellation of the GPID’s temporary water right. This allowed WaterWatch to enter into direct negotiations with the GPID and forge a settlement of all federal and state litigation. This was formalized in a Consent Decree entered in August 2001. The Decree required the GPID to work for federal legislation to remove the dam and replace it with pumps and set a specific timeline for dam removal. The irrigation district also agreed to transfer 800 cubic feet per second (23 m^{3}/s) of its water right to an instream water right devoted to fish. This represents the largest water right transfer of its kind in Oregon and one of the largest such transfers in the western United States.

In 2002, the Oregon Watershed Enhancement Board (OWEB) pledged $3,000,000 toward the dam removal, the largest single grant OWEB had made until that time. This grant became a catalyst for federal legislation authorizing the Bureau of Reclamation to remove the dam, which passed the U.S. Congress in December 2003. In all, the removal project is expected to cost some $40,000,000, with the funds primarily coming from federal government.

Additionally, the replacement pumping system has not been without its faults. Several times over successive irrigation seasons, pumps have been covered by sediment from the river, resulting in expensive river dredging. These issues were presented as concerns prior to the dam removal as the Bureau of Reclamation has studied impacts of sediment migration after dam removals.

=== 2009 removal timeline ===
- April 7: Began building first coffer dam
- Mid-April: First "wet" test of new pumps
- Late April: Rerouted Rogue River to south side
- Early May: Irrigation began with new pumps
- June–July: Demolition of north half of dam
- Nov.-Dec.: Completed dam demolition

== Facilities description ==
Savage Rapids Dam consisted of a 16-bay spillway section and a hydraulic-driven pumping plant section at the right abutment. The maximum height of the spillway section is about 39 feet (12 m). The first seven bays at the right end of the dam were multiple arches with buttresses on 25-foot (7.6 m) centers. The remaining nine bays have a concrete gravity section below the gates. Spillway control was originally provided by 16 wooden-faced radial gates, each 23 feet (7.0 m) wide and 10 feet (3.0 m) high. Later, radial gates were replaced with metal stoplogs, and one double-gated river outlet with a capacity of 6,000 cubic feet per second (170 m^{3}/s) was installed at the center of the dam. During the irrigation season, the stoplogs were used to raise the reservoir's elevation 11 feet (3.4 m).

Prior to the construction of the new pumping system, the main pumping plant at the diversion dam consisted of two hydraucone turbine units that operated at a 29-foot (8.8 m) head. One turbine drove a centrifugal pump with a capacity of 75 cubic feet per second (2.1 m^{3}/s) against a 90-foot (27 m) head, and supplied water to the South Highline Canal. The other turbine drove two pumps connected in series, with a capacity of 50 cubic feet per second (1.4 m^{3}/s) against a head of 150 feet (46 m), and supplies water to the Tokay Canal.

== Reasons for removal ==
The Rogue River in southwestern Oregon is one of the nation's most outstanding rivers and the second largest producer of salmon in Oregon outside of the Columbia basin. Because of its scenery, whitewater, and its salmon and steelhead fishery, it was one of the original group of rivers designated as "wild and scenic" with the passage of the federal Wild and Scenic Rivers Act in 1968. The Bureau of Land Management estimates that some 25,000 visitors use the Rogue River each year.

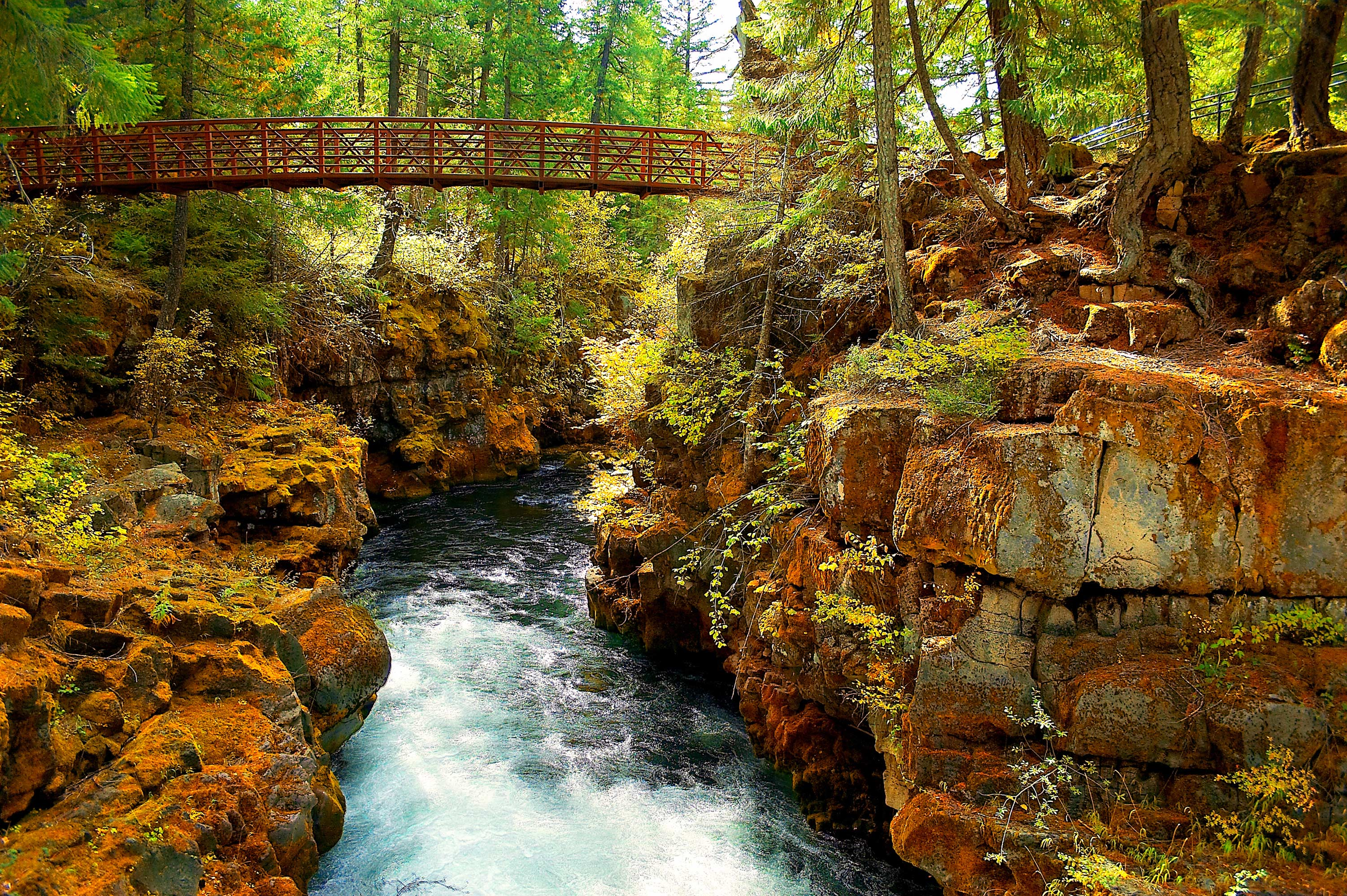
Rogue River, Oregon.

The Savage Rapids Dam had long been considered the biggest fish killer on the Rogue River. Located at river mile 107, the dam was the first human-built obstruction that native salmon and steelhead trout encounter during their migration upstream from the ocean to spawn in-river. Upstream of the Savage Rapids Dam, there are over 500 (square?) miles of salmon and steelhead trout spawning habitat, including 50 miles on the mainstream of the Rogue River. All of this river's prized spring chinook salmon spawn upstream of the dam, and this dam impeded passage of significant portions of the four other runs of salmon and steelhead in the Rogue River, including the coho salmon, which is listed as "threatened" under the Federal Endangered Species Act.

This dam's fish ladders and fish screens did not meet current legal or practical standards. The north ladder only operated during the irrigation season, had poor attraction flows and was generally inadequate. The south ladder had poor attraction flows and it was difficult to regulate flows within the ladder. During the spring and fall, when dam operations were starting up and shutting down, upstream fish passage could be totally blocked. Adult fish were delayed, injured, and sometimes killed while trying to navigate the dam in their upstream spawning migration, thereby reducing overall spawning success. Downstream juvenile fish were impinged on and entrained through the screens over the dam's diversion and pump-turbine systems. There was increased predation of young fish in the seasonal reservoir pool created by the dam and after juveniles pass through the dam's bypass systems. There was a loss of 3.5 miles of fall chinook salmon spawning habitat that could be reclaimed from the elimination of the seasonal reservoir pool when the dam was removed.

According to a 1995 U.S. Bureau of Reclamation’s Planning Report and Environmental Statement (PRES), removal of the dam would increase fish escapement at the site by 22%. This translates into approximately 114,000 more salmon and steelhead each year (87,900 that would be available for sport and commercial harvest and 26,700 that would escape to spawn) valued at approximately $5,000,000 annually. Reclamation's PRES also found removing the dam and replacing it with pumps to be more cost effective than trying to fix the ladders and screens. The National Marine Fisheries Service, U.S. Fish and Wildlife Service, and Oregon Department of Fish and Wildlife all support dam removal as the best, most viable, and only permanent solution to the fish passage problems at Savage Rapids Dam.
