= Union violence in the United States =

Union violence in the United States is physical force used by labor unions in the United States, intended to harm employers, managers, replacement workers, union abstainers, sympathizers of the prior groups, or their families. On various occasions violence has been committed by unions or union members during labor disputes in the United States. When union violence has occurred, it has frequently been in the context of industrial unrest. Violence has ranged from isolated acts by individuals to wider campaigns of organised violence aimed at furthering union goals within an industrial dispute.

According to labor historians and other scholars, the United States has had the bloodiest and most violent labor history of any industrial nation in the world, and there have been few industries which have been immune. Researchers in industrial relations, criminology, and wider cultural studies have examined violence by workers or trade unions in the context of industrial disputes. The US government has examined violence during industrial disputes.

== Overview ==
According to a 1969 study, no major labor organization in American history has ever openly advocated violence as a policy, although some, in the early part of the 20th century, systematically used violence, most notably the Western Federation of Miners, and the International Association of Bridge, Structural, Ornamental and Reinforcing Iron Workers. However, violence does occur in the context of industrial disputes. When violence has been committed by, or in the name of, the union, it has tended to be narrowly focused upon targets which are associated with the employer. Violence was greater in conflicts in which there was a question of whether union recognition would be extended.

Union violence most typically occurs in specific situations, and has more frequently been aimed at preventing replacement workers from taking jobs during a strike, than at managers or employers.

Protest and verbal abuse are routinely aimed against union members or replacement workers who cross picket lines ("blacklegs") during industrial disputes. The inherent aim of a union is to create a labor monopoly so as to balance the monopsony a large employer enjoys as a purchaser of labor. Strikebreakers threaten that goal and undermine the union's bargaining position, and occasionally this erupts into violent confrontation, with violence committed either by, or against, strikers. Some who have sought to explain such violence observe, if labor disputes are accompanied by violence, it may be because labor has no legal redress. In 1894, some workers declared:

..."the right of employers to manage their own business to suit themselves," is fast coming to mean in effect nothing less than a right to manage the country to suit themselves.

A 1969 study of labor conflict violence in the United States examined the era following the 1947 passage of the Taft-Hartley Act, and concluded that violence had substantially abated. In the 16 years from 1947 through 1962, 29 people died in labor conflicts, a rate much lower than in previous eras. The study noted that attacks on strikers by company guards had all but disappeared. They estimated from NLRB records that 80 to 100 acts of violence by union members or supporters occurred each year, most of the attacks on people being unplanned fights with strikebreakers crossing picket lines. In the 1960s, the most common complaint of union violence was of sabotage during labor disputes. Numerous incidents included dynamite explosions, but targeting property, and without any dynamite-related injuries.

== 19th century ==
=== Great Railroad Strike of 1877 ===
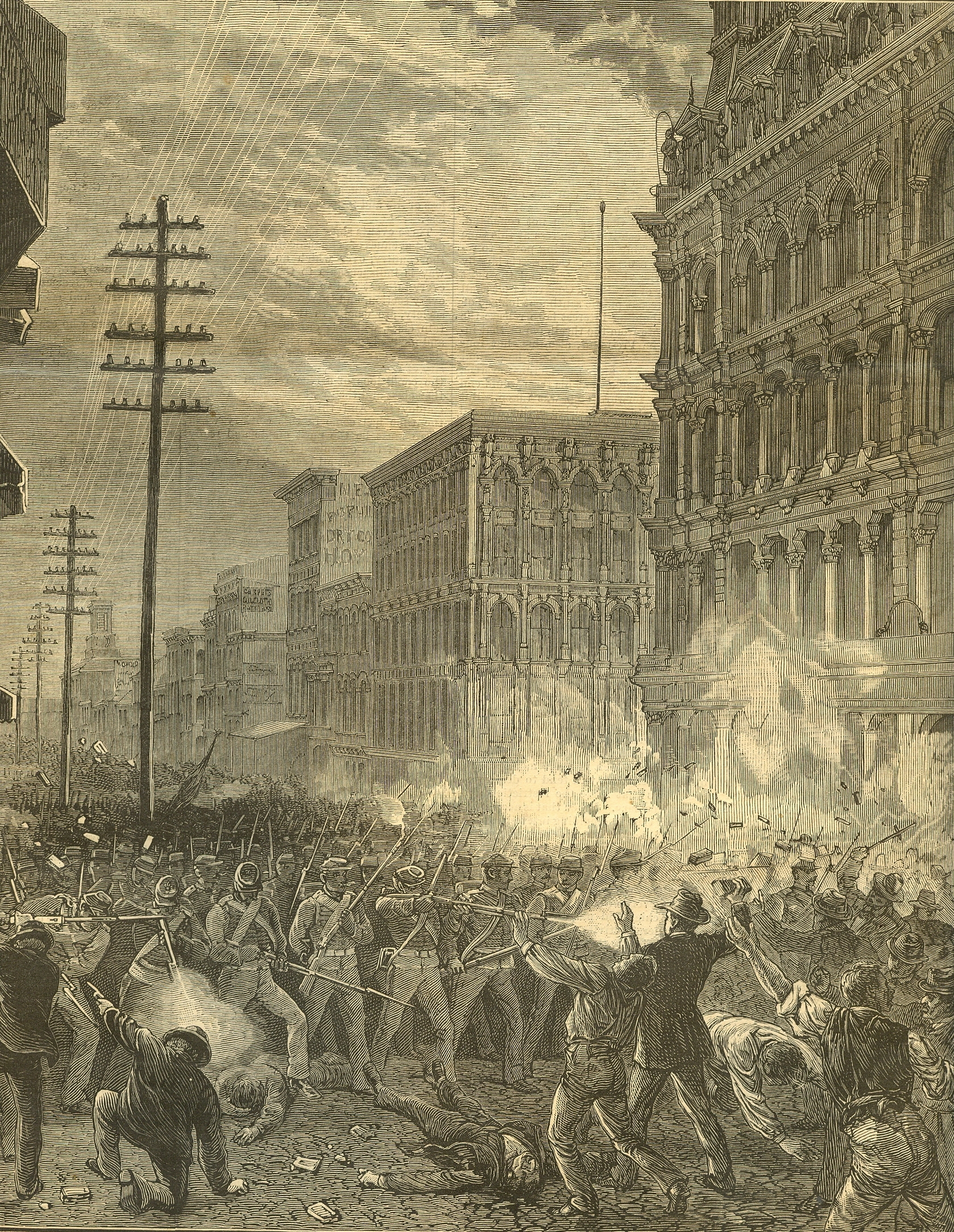
Sixth Regiment of the Maryland Militia fighting its way through Baltimore, Maryland, 20 July 1877

The great railroad strike of 1877 saw considerable violence by, and against, workers, and occurred before unions were widespread. It started on July 14 in Martinsburg, West Virginia, in response to the cutting of wages for the second time in a year by the Baltimore & Ohio Railroad (B&O). Striking workers would not allow any of the stock to roll until this second wage cut was revoked. West Virginia governor Henry M. Mathews sent in state militia units to restore train service, but the soldiers refused to use force against the strikers and the governor called for federal troops.

Violent street battles occurred in Maryland between the striking workers and the Maryland militia. When the outnumbered troops of the 6th Regiment fired on an attacking crowd, they killed 10 and wounded 25. The rioters injured several members of the militia, damaged engines and train cars, and burned portions of the train station. On July 21–22, the President sent federal troops and Marines to Baltimore to restore order.

In Pittsburgh, strikers threw rocks at militiamen, who bayoneted their antagonists, killing twenty people and wounding twenty-nine others.

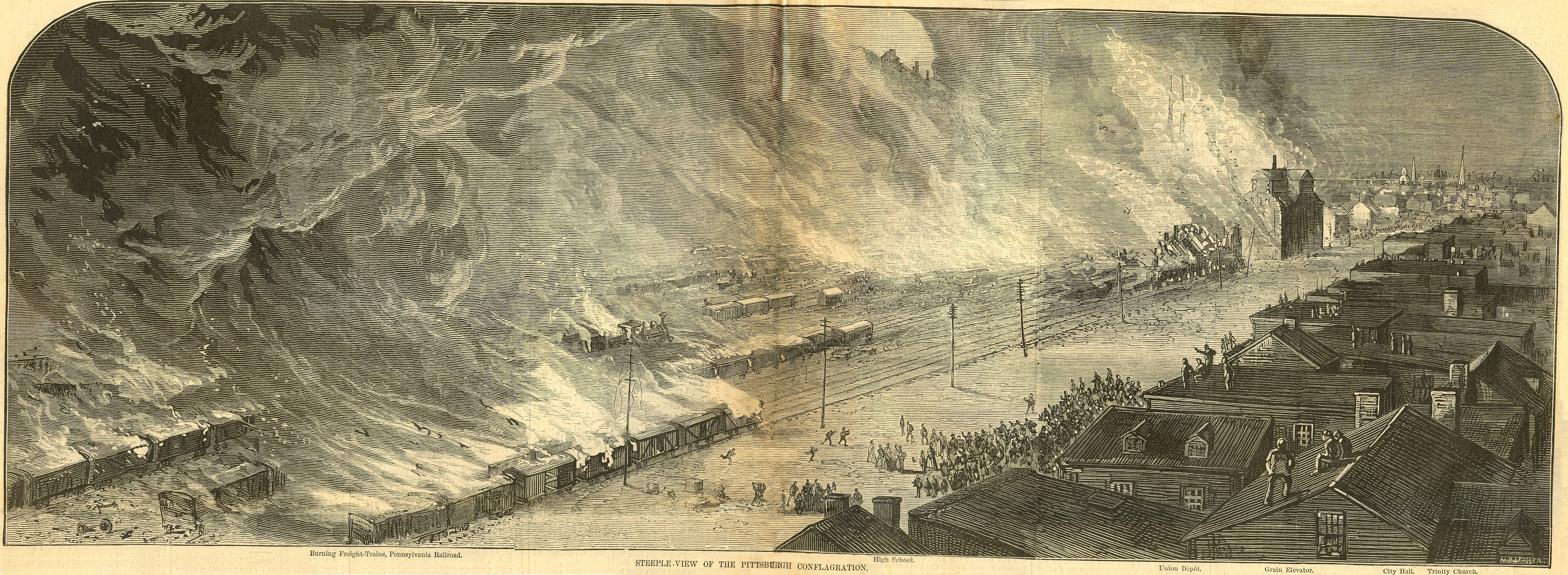
Burning of Pennsylvania Railroad and Union Depot, Pittsburgh, Pennsylvania, 21–22 July 1877

In Reading, Pennsylvania, workers conducted mass marches, blocked rail traffic, committed trainyard arson, and burned a bridge. The state militia shot sixteen citizens in the Reading Railroad Massacre. The militia responsible for the shootings was mobilized by Reading Railroad management, not by local public officials.

Chicago was paralyzed when angry mobs of unemployed citizens wreaked havoc in the rail yards. The strike was eventually suppressed by thousands of vigilantes, National Guard, and federal troops.

=== Haymarket affair of 1886 ===
In 1886 the Haymarket affair (also known as the Haymarket massacre or Haymarket riot) was a protest rally and subsequent violence on May 4 at the Haymarket Square in Chicago. The rally supported striking workers. When police began to disperse the public meeting, an unknown person threw a dynamite bomb into their midst. The bomb blast and ensuing gunfire resulted in the deaths of eight police officers, mostly from friendly fire, and an unknown number of civilians. In the internationally publicized legal proceedings that followed, eight anarchists were tried for murder. Four men were convicted and executed, and one committed suicide in prison, although the prosecution conceded none of the defendants had thrown the bomb.

The Haymarket affair is generally considered significant for the origin of international May Day observances for workers. The causes of the Haymarket Affair are still controversial, but can be traced in part to an incident the previous day, in which police fired into a crowd of agitated workers during shift change at the McCormick Works, where the regular work force was on strike, and at least two workers were killed. In popular literature, the Haymarket Affair inspired the caricature of "a bomb-throwing anarchist."

Illinois Governor John Peter Altgeld later pardoned the three living survivors of the Haymarket prosecution, concluding (as have subsequent scholars) that there had been a serious miscarriage of justice in their prosecutions.

=== Burlington strike of 1888 ===
During the 1888 strike against the Chicago, Burlington and Quincy Railroad, workers were arrested for wrecking a train. When one of those arrested turned out to be a detective, organized labor argued that the detective had incited the others.

=== Labor unrest in 1892 ===
"In the 1890s violent outbreaks occurred in the North, South, and West, in small communities and metropolitan cities, testifying to the common attitudes of Americans in every part of the United States." Workers with different ethnic origins who worked under very different conditions in widely separated parts of the United States nonetheless responded with equal ferocity when unions came under attack. "Serious violence erupted in several major strikes of the 1890s, the question of union recognition being a factor in all of them."

1892 in particular was a year of considerable labor unrest. Governors of five states called out the national guard and/or the army to quell unrest—against miners in East Tennessee and in Coeur D'Alene, Idaho, where a shooting war followed the discovery of a labor spy, against switchmen in Buffalo, New York, against a general strike in New Orleans, Louisiana, and against the Homestead, Pennsylvania steel strike.

==== Coeur d'Alene, Idaho labor strike ====
The strike of 1892 in Coeur d'Alene, Idaho erupted in violence when a union miner was killed by mine guards, and was further inflamed when union miners discovered they had been infiltrated by a Pinkerton agent who had routinely provided union information to the mine owners.

On Sunday night, July 10, armed union miners gathered on the hills above the Frisco mine. More union miners were arriving from surrounding communities. At five in the morning, shots rang out, and the firing became continuous. Both sides blamed the other for starting the shooting. The union miners, exposed on the logged-off hillside, had not positioned themselves for a gunfight, while mine guards were able to shelter in buildings. The union men circled above the mill, and got into a position where they could send a box of black powder down the flume into one of the mine buildings. The building exploded, killing one company man and injuring several others. The union miners fired into a remaining structure where the guards had taken shelter. A second company man was killed, and sixty or so guards surrendered. Union men marched their prisoners to the union hall.

The violence caused the governor to declare Martial Law, and bring in six companies of the Idaho National Guard to "suppress insurrection and violence." Federal troops also arrived, and they confined six hundred miners in bullpens without any hearings or formal charges. Some were later "sent up" for violating injunctions, others for obstructing the United States mail.

==== Homestead Strike, and an assassination attempt ====
One of the most notorious incidents of violence against management occurred in 1892 during the Homestead Strike—one of the most violent industrial disputes in American history—when Alexander Berkman attempted to assassinate Henry Clay Frick, chairman of the Carnegie Steel Company and manager of the mill where the strike occurred. Frick had locked out the workers, and later hired three hundred armed guards from the Pinkerton Detective Agency to break the union's picket lines, resulting in gunfire and flaming barges on the Ohio River. There was a consensus of all parties that the presence of the Pinkertons inflamed the attitudes of the strikers. The strikers defeated the Pinkertons, but could not keep the mills from operating after the National Guard was deployed.

Berkman, an avowed anarchist, had no connection to the union involved in the strike, but believed he was acting in the workers' interests. He was motivated by newspaper reports of,

...Henry Clay Frick, whose attitude toward labor is implacably hostile; his secret military preparations while designedly prolonging the peace negotiations with the Amalgamated; the fortification of the Homestead steel-works; the erection of a high board fence, capped by barbed wire and provided with loopholes for sharpshooters; the hiring of an army of Pinkerton thugs; the attempt to smuggle them, in the dead of night, into Homestead; and, finally, the terrible carnage.

Berkman's attack, called an attentat by the anarchists, injured but failed to kill Frick. Having anticipated that his act would launch a worker uprising, Berkman was surprised when a carpenter hit him with a hammer after he had been restrained. The attempted murder alienated the anarchist community from much of the labor movement, as well as dividing the anarchist community itself. Frick had been widely hated, but in at least one analysis, becoming the victim of such an attack transformed him into a "folk hero" in the public view.

During the Homestead strike, Carnegie Steel Company employees in Duquesne joined the strike that was occurring across the river. A riot broke out, and a number of the workers were arrested. It turned out that two of the strikers were Pinkerton detectives, and convictions were secured.

=== Battle of Virden, 1898 ===
In 1897, the Pana Coal Company attempted to import African-American strikebreakers. A train car was intercepted by armed striking miners, and the strikebreakers were sent home unharmed.

The following year, however, another company, the Chicago-Virden Coal Company, attempted a similar strike-breaking effort, this time with an armed escort on the train car. The result was called the Battle of Virden. Guards fired their rifles as they disembarked from the train. In the ensuing gun battle, fourteen men, including eight strikers, were killed. Governor Tanner criticized the company, and called up the National Guard, who were able to restore order. The National Guard prevented a similar incident by turning away additional strikebreakers the day after the riot.

=== Coeur d'Alene, Idaho labor confrontation of 1899 ===
In April 1899, as the Western Federation of Miners (WFM) was launching an organizing drive of the few locations not yet unionized, superintendent Albert Burch declared that the company would rather "shut down and remain closed twenty years" than to recognize the union. He then fired seventeen workers that he believed to be union members and demanded that all other union men collect their back pay and quit.

On April 29, 250 angry union members belonging to the WFM seized a train in Burke. At each stop through Burke-Canyon, more miners climbed aboard. At Frisco, the train stopped to load eighty wooden boxes, each containing fifty pounds of dynamite. Nearly a thousand men rode the train to Wardner, the site of a $250,000 mill of the Bunker Hill mine. After carrying three thousand pounds of dynamite into the mill, they set their charges and scattered. Two men were killed, one of them a non-union miner, the other a union man accidentally shot by other miners. Their mission accomplished, the miners once again boarded the "Dynamite Express" and left the scene.

From Kellog to Wallace, ranchers and laboring people lined the tracks and, according to one eyewitness, "cheered the [union] men lustily as they passed."

Once again, miners were rounded up and herded into bullpens and held there for months.

== Early 20th century ==
=== Colorado Labor Wars of 1903–04 ===
During the Western Federation of Miners strike of 1903–04, there was considerable violence, including an explosion at the Vindicator mine which killed two, and an explosion at the Independence Depot which killed thirteen. The Cripple Creek Mining District was under occupation by the Colorado National Guard, the Citizens' Alliance was active in the district, and historians continue to debate who was responsible for each incident of violence. One likely perpetrator was convicted assassin Harry Orchard. A major in the National Guard later testified that the militia was responsible for orchestrated beatings of striking miners.

=== Assassination of former Idaho governor, 1905 ===
Former Idaho governor Frank Steunenberg was killed outside his house by a bomb placed by Harry Orchard, a former miner from the Western Federation of Miners (WFM). Orchard claimed he was hired to kill Steunenberg by leadership of the WFM, and that he had been involved in at least 17 other deaths.

=== International Association of Bridge Structural Iron Workers, 1906-1911 ===
Perhaps the most significant example of a campaign of union violence was carried out by the International Association of Bridge Structural Iron Workers from 1906 to 1910. With the blessing and financial support of high-ranking leadership, the union set dynamite and nitroglycerine bombs at about 100 sites from 1906 to 1911, typically at construction sites using non-union workers. These series of attacks has been described as the largest domestic terrorism spree in American history.

The bombings were carried out in retaliation against workplaces that used open shop policies (allowing non-union and union workers side by side, or prohibiting unions altogether), rather than closed shops (union only). The bombs were purportedly placed with the intention of damaging property, not people, but several explosions injured people (e.g., "5 or 6" injuries at a Hoboken, New Jersey construction site in the early morning of March 31, 1909), and on other occasions passersby or night watchmen came within minutes of being at the scene of explosions. Approximately one hundred structures were damaged or destroyed by dynamite, including bridges, viaducts, railroad tracks and loaded rail cars, machine shops, office buildings, and warehouses in the states of Illinois, Indiana, New York, Ohio, Iowa, Michigan, Wisconsin, Massachusetts, New Jersey, Missouri, California and Utah. Financial damages ran into the hundreds of thousands of dollars in contemporary calculation. About a hundred non-union workers were assaulted. In the Chicago area alone, there were 12 dynamite attacks on non-union construction sites from 1906 to 1911, six of them taking place in 1910.

Harrison Gray Otis, publisher of the Los Angeles Times, was a vocal opponent of labor unions. On 1 October 1910, a union dynamite bomb exploded at the Los Angeles Times building. The explosion and subsequent fire killed 21 Times workers, and injured 100 more.

The next day, a mysterious suitcase was found outside the home of Times publisher Otis; police moved the suitcase away from the building. When they opened it, they heard ticking, and ran. They were 60 feet away when the dynamite went off, creating a crater and rattling windows, but without injuring anyone. Another dynamite bomb was discovered and disarmed at the Los Angeles home of the president of the anti-union Merchants and Manufacturers Association.

The southern California crew of Ortie McManigal and James B. Macnamara were still not through, and set off eight more explosions, including a Christmas Day 1910 explosion at the Llewellyn Iron Works in Los Angeles.

Police found bomb-making equipment, including dynamite, at the Ironworkers Union office in San Francisco, and at the union headquarters in Indianapolis. Union member Ortie McManigal later confessed and testified against the others.

James B. Macnamara pled guilty to placing the Los Angeles Times bomb, and his brother John J. Macnamara, secretary-treasurer of the union, pled guilty to planning the bombing of the Llewellyn Iron Works. In all, 40 members of the Iron Workers Union were convicted in the dynamite campaign, including union president Frank Ryan.

As of 2016, the Ironworkers Union website commented on the bombing spree:

McNamara, Ryan, Clancy, Butler, Morrin and the others may have done what they thought they had to do to preserve the International Association. And despite other consequences of the dynamite campaign, they did save the Union. The International Officers stretched the limits of zeal in a righteous cause. Their strategy and tactics suffered - not the cause or validity of unionism.

=== East St Louis Illinois Riot, 1917 ===
With the migration of African Americans Northward and the mixing of White and Black workers in factories, the tension was building, largely driven by White workers. The AFL, the American Federation of Labor, advocated the separation between European Americans and African Americans in the workplace. There were non-violent protests such as walk-outs in protest of having Blacks and Whites working together. As tension was building due to advocating for segregation in the workplace, violence soon erupted.

In 1917, the East St Louis Illinois Riot, known for one of the bloodiest workplace riots, had between 40 and 200 killed and over 6000 African Americans displaced from their homes. The NAACP, National Association for the Advancement of Colored People, responded to the violence with a march known as the Silent March. Over 10,000 African American men and women demonstrated in Harlem, New York. Conflicts continued post World War I, as African Americans continued to face conflicts and tension while the African American labor activism continued.

=== Battle of Blair Mountain, 1921 ===
Two years of conflict between miners and mine owners, characterized by utilization of the Baldwin–Felts Detective Agency for infiltrating, sabotaging and attacking the United Mine Workers union, culminated in the Battle of Blair Mountain in 1921. The largest armed insurrection since the American Civil War was touched off by the murders of Sid Hatfield and Ed Chambers on the courthouse steps of Welch, West Virginia. The Battle of Blair Mountain was a spontaneous uprising of ten thousand coal miners from throughout West Virginia who fought the coal company's hired guns and their allies, the state police for three days before federal troops intervened.

=== The Herrin Massacre, 1922 ===
Williamson County, Illinois, a county with a "unique history of violence" for a rural county, was the location of the Herrin Massacre, one of the most horrific and perplexing incidents of union violence. The 1922 incident is considered the most notorious of the United Mine Workers' struggles in Illinois. The massacre was committed by members (and possibly at the instruction of local leadership) of the United Mine Workers. Three union men died in the exchange of gunfire during an afternoon-long armed siege of a non-union mine. The next day, the non-union miners surrendered and were disarmed in exchange for safe passage out of the county. However, union miners killed 20 men of the 50 strikebreakers and mine guards who surrendered. The ruthless retaliation occurred against the backdrop of broken promises, double dealing, and missed opportunities on both sides.

=== Theater bombings, 1928 ===
Six Seattle movie theaters were bombed over the course of a year, protesting non-union shops.

== Late 20th century ==
=== 1968 Sanitation Workers Strike in NYC ===
Workers in New York City refused to pick up garbage for 9 days. Immortalized in a song by the Stylistics in 1971 People Make the World Go Round.

=== 1979 Imperial Valley Lettuce Strike ===
The United Farm Workers 1979 strike against Imperial Valley lettuce growers was organized by Cesar Chavez to dispute wages for produce workers. Despite his outspoken calls for peaceful protests and the UFW's policy of non-violence, several instances of widespread violence and damage occurred during the strike. "UFW pickets engaged in rock-throwing, blocking access to and from grower facilities or fields, rushing into fields towards replacement workers, throwing nail-type devices on the ground to cause flat tires in grower vehicles, overturning grower vehicles, carrying or using sticks, clubs, sling shots or other weapons. There was evidence that the picket captains urged strikers to throw rocks and to vandalize grower equipment. There was evidence that King and the picket captains made threats to kill the replacement workers. There was evidence that the UFW could discipline picketers who violated strike rules by pulling them off the picket line and having them work elsewhere yet the evidence tended to show the UFW rarely disciplined picketers. There was testimony picket captains encouraged strikers to throw rocks and vandalize grower equipment. In particular, there was evidence of a "Fantasma" or "Phantom Crew" organized by the strikers to intimidate growers and replacement workers. This phantom crew was composed of five or six "real strong young men" who would use a black van at night to attack replacement workers and to vandalize irrigation equipment, vehicles and homes belonging to growers and replacement workers.

In the following years, a judge would later find the actions of the UFW were "acts of unlawful picketing" and held them financially liable for damages to the growers.

=== 1985 Massey Energy strike ===
The United Mine Workers Union 1985 strike against Massey Energy included attacks on company vehicles with rifle fire. Trucks hauling coal from the mines were fired upon with rifles a number of times, and three drivers had previously been wounded by the rifle fire before June 1985, when another truck convoy was hit by rifle fire, killing driver Hayes West when his truck was hit by at least 21 rifle rounds, and the driver of another truck was wounded.

State and local law enforcement did not charge anyone in the death of Hayes West. Five members of the United Mine Workers Union, including Donnie Thornsbury, president of UMW Local 2496, were indicted by a federal grand jury, arrested, and charged with conspiracy to damage and disable motor vehicles used in interstate commerce. After a trial in federal court, four out of the five were convicted, including union official Thornsbury, and their convictions were upheld on appeal.

=== 1986, Electrical Workers protest ===
During protests by the International Brotherhood of Electrical Workers Local 1547 against a non-unionized workforce getting a contract, picketers threatened and assaulted workers, spat at them, sabotaged equipment, and shot guns near workers. In 1999, the Alaska Supreme Court ruled that the union had engaged in "ongoing acts of intimidation, violence, destruction of property", awarding the plaintiff $212,500 in punitive damages.

=== 1986/1987, Hotel Workers Strike ===
Three union workers set fire to the Hotel Dupont Plaza in San Juan, Puerto Rico, while other union members staged a fight as a distraction. The union, said to be affiliated with the Teamsters, was having a labor dispute with management over pay and health care. Ninety-seven people were killed, none of whom were union members. Most bodies were burned beyond recognition.

=== 1989 Pittston coal strike ===
The 1989 strike by the United Mine Workers of America (UMWA) against the Pittston Coal Company's mines in Virginia and West Virginia was marked by shots fired at strikebreakers. In July 1989, a car bomb exploded in the parking lot of Pittston headquarters at Lebanon, Virginia.

=== 1990, New York Daily News Strike ===
On the first day of The New York Daily News strike, delivery trucks were attacked with stones and sticks, and in some cases burned, with the drivers beaten. Strikers then started threatening newsstands with arson, or stole all copies of the Daily News and burned them in front of the newsstands. James Hoge, publisher of the Daily News, alleged that there had been some 700 serious acts of violence. The New York Police Department claimed knowledge of 229 incidents of violence. Criminal charges under the Hobbs Act were declined, however, citing the aforementioned Enmons case.

=== 1993 Arch Mineral Corporation strike ===
Eight members of the striking United Mine Workers Union were arrested after Eddie York was shot and killed in Logan County, West Virginia, as he drove away from the coal mine, through the picket line. York, an employee of an environmental contractor, was at the mine to perform government-mandated maintenance of sedimentation ponds, work unrelated to the labor dispute. In the same incident, a truck driven by a mine guard was struck by rocks thrown by strikers on the picket line, which smashed the windshield. Howard Green, a member of the UMW executive board, accused Arch Corporation mine guards of murdering York, to give bad publicity to the union.

State and local law enforcement did not charge anyone in York's death. The FBI and Justice Department, citing the Enmons case, decided they could not prosecute under the Hobbs Act. The federal government charged eight of the picketers for interfering with interstate transportation. Seven of the union members, including the president of the local, accepted plea deals in connection with the rock-throwing. The eighth, Jerry Dale Lowe, was charged with firing the fatal shot, and was tried in federal court for illegal use of a firearm to incapacitate a driver involved in interstate commerce (the federal government could not charge him with murder, because murder is not a federal crime). In 1994, a federal jury convicted Jerry Dale Lowe of killing Eddie York, and he was sentenced to 11 years in prison. Although all eight of those charged had violated various UMWA picket-line rules against drinking, masking their faces, rock-throwing, and having guns at the picket line, none were subject to any UMWA discipline. On the contrary, the union successfully fought to get the seven who pled guilty their old jobs back after the strike.

=== 1997, Teamsters Union strike against UPS ===
In Miami, during a 1997 Teamsters Union strike against UPS, a group of men pulled UPS truck driver Rod Carter out of his truck, beat him, and stabbed him six times with an ice pick. Carter had earlier received a threatening phone call from the home of Anthony Cannestro, Sr., president of Teamsters Local 769. Carter sued Teamsters local 769, charging that union officials had encouraged violent behavior by its members. The Teamsters Union settled with Carter by paying an undisclosed sum.

== 21st century ==
=== Laborers Local 91, Niagara, New York, 1995-2001 ===
For years, officials of Laborers Local 91, in Niagara, New York, directed a strongarm squad of union members to make death threats and to commit criminal acts against nonunion construction workers and work sites. In 1997, the union fire-bombed a residence used by non-union workers in Niagara Falls, New York, causing permanent injury to one of the inhabitants. In 1998, union members attacked four tile-layers at a supermarket construction site, beating them so badly that they were all hospitalized, one so badly that he had not returned to work four years later.

State and local law enforcement did not charge anyone in the beatings. After a four-year federal investigation, the FBI arrested 14 union members for the violence, including the local's vice president, business manager, assistant business manager, and a former president. Andrew Shomers confessed to the fire-bombing, and also to the beatings at the supermarket site. Another union member, confessed to driving the getaway car in the fire bombing. Anthony Cerrone, a member of local 91, confessed to involvement in the supermarket attack and the fire-bombing.

=== 2011, Longshoremen ===
It was reported on September 9, 2011, that members of the International Longshore and Warehouse Union (ILWU) frightened security guards, dumped grain, and vandalized property belonging to EGT, LLC, over a labor dispute. No one was hurt, and no one had been arrested at the time the incident was reported. District Judge Ronald Leighton later issued a preliminary injunction against the ILWU citing their reported behavior.

=== 2012, Lansing, Michigan ===
Union workers protesting right-to-work legislation in Lansing, Michigan destroyed a tent run by Americans for Prosperity. People were inside the tent but managed to escape before the collapse. Additionally, hot dog stand operator Clinton Tarver, a popular vendor around the Capital area who was hired to provide catering for AFP, lost his equipment, condiments, coolers, and food in the collapse. According to Tarver (an African American), union workers, who had incorrectly assumed he was supporting AFP, called Tarver an "Uncle Tom nigger". A union worker also punched conservative comedian and Fox News contributor Steven Crowder, resulting in a chipped tooth and a minor cut on the forehead. Another worker threatened to kill Crowder with a gun.

=== Ironworkers Local 401, Philadelphia, 2015 ===
In 2014, Ironworkers union members caused $500,000 in damage to the non-union construction site of a Quaker meetinghouse in Chestnut Hill. In another incident, Ironworkers beat nonunion workers outside a Toys-R-Us store with baseball bats. Some of the violence was directed at union construction sites staffed by other craft unions, such as the Carpenters Union, in an attempt to get the work for the Ironworkers.

After an FBI investigation, federal prosecutors filed racketeering and arson charges against ten officers and members of Ironworkers Local 401. Eleven union members pled guilty to property destruction and arson against non-union construction sites, including the Chestnut Hill Quaker meetinghouse. Some of the repeat perpetrators said that they "jokingly" called themselves "'The Helpful Union Guys,' or 'T.H.U.G.S.'". Those who pled guilty testified that their crimes were at the direction of the Ironworkers Local's business manager, Joseph Dougherty. Dougherty was convicted in July 2018, and sentenced to 19 years in prison by a federal judge.

=== Carpenters Union, Philadelphia, 2015 ===
In 2015, the Pennsylvania Convention Center Authority sued the Carpenters Union local in Philadelphia for racketeering, under the federal RICO statute. The Authority charged that the union had engaged in a pattern of "illegal and disruptive mass picketing and protests; physical intimidation, harassment, stalking, and assault and battery; verbal intimidation, harassment, race-baiting, and threats; and the destruction of property." The Carpenters Union denied the charges.

== Union-on-union violence ==
Sometimes, unions are accused of violence or threats of violence by other unions.

=== Railroad Trainmen versus Street Railway Employees, 1940 ===
In June 1940, a bus driver member of the Amalgamated Association of Street Railway & Motor Coach Employees, which was not on strike, was killed at the hands of members of the Brotherhood of Railroad Trainmen, which claimed to represent the bus drivers. The Railroad Trainmen blamed the bus driver, calling him a strikebreaker. The Street Railway & Motor Coach Employees union later won an NLRB representation election, defeating the Brotherhood of Railroad Trainmen.

=== United Mine Workers versus Progressive Mine Workers, 1941 ===
In 1932, some southern Illinois coal miners dissatisfied with the concessions made by the United Mine Workers Union, and what they regarded as the autocratic ways of its leader, John L. Lewis, broke away and formed the Progressive Miners of America (PMA), later renamed the Progressive Mine Workers of America. The rival unions clashed violently from the start, resulting in numerous deaths on both sides, as well as police officers killed trying to prevent the violence.

The violence was especially intense in southern Illinois in 1932 and 1933, when PMA picketers tried to stop UMWA members from entering the mines. Officers and members of both unions were shot on the street and bombed in their homes. In addition, PMA members set off bombs to stop rail shipments of UMWA-mined coal, trying to force the companies to recognize the PMA. In 1937 the federal government charged 36 PMA members and officers with racketeering, in connection with 44 dynamite explosions at mines and rail facilities. The PMA maintained that the charges resulted from collusion between the FBI, UMWA, and Peabody Coal, and that their methods were no different from those of the UMWA. All 36 were convicted. Although the prison sentences were no more than 16 months, the fines and legal expenses had drained the PMA treasury, and the verdicts labelled the PMA as an outlaw organization.

The Progressive Mine Workers union survived, and PMWA-UMWA violence flared up occasionally over the years, as one union would strike while the other continued to work, and they both claimed to represent miners at various coal mines. In 1946, two miners died in clashes between the rival unions at a mine at Benham, Kentucky, which was represented by the Progressive Mine Workers. In 1982, the Progressive Mine Workers of America represented 4,500 coal miners, compared to the UMWA's membership of 160,000. The union dissolved in 1999.

== Legal status ==
In the United States, union violence often goes unpunished because of pro-union sympathies, or political pressure not to prosecute. A 1966 study cited numerous examples of local and state police failing to interfere with, and state and local prosecutors failing to prosecute, union violence. The authors concluded:

A public official sees many votes on the picket line; few in the office. Perhaps in 1932 it was true that local officials were ignorant of union objectives and brutal in the extreme toward peaceful picketers. Nothing could be further from the truth in 1966.

Although replacement workers have the legal right to be free from violence or intimidation in labor disputes, many law enforcement officials will not interfere with union intimidation, for fear of being accused of being anti-union. When Democratic governor of Arizona Bruce Babbitt sent the national guard to prevent threatened violence by strikers in the Phelps Dodge copper strike of 1982, a union official charged that he was "in the pocket" of Phelps Dodge.

=== Legal exceptions for labor unions ===
The US Chamber of Commerce has pointed out that a number of states have made legal exceptions for labor disputes in their criminal laws. For example, California, Pennsylvania, Nevada, and Illinois have exempted labor disputes from their laws against stalking.

The Hobbs act makes extortion a federal crime, but under the United States Supreme Court's 1973 Enmons decision (United States v. Enmons), the actions of union officials in organizing strikes and other united acts of workers are exempt from Hobbs Act prosecutions, as long as the labor dispute is over pay for work performed. This exemption does not confer any immunity from state prosecution for violent acts.

=== Union policies ===
No American labor union currently has a policy of openly advocating violence, and some, such as the United Mine Workers in the Pittston Coal strike, have publicly emphasized peaceful means; the UMWA has striking members watch videos about the union's rules to assure peaceful picketing. Labor unions have an incentive to keep strikes, and especially picket lines, peaceful, because if an activity organized and supervised by union officials such as picketing, becomes violent, the union itself may be found liable, in addition to the individuals.

=== Public sympathies ===
Some union sympathizers believe that labor union violence is justified, especially when directed at strikebreakers. Some hold that the law allowing and protecting strikebreakers is unfair, so that violence and intimidation are the only ways labor unionists can stage an effective strike. Others believe that, although violence is wrong, it should be tolerated as an excess done for the greater good. Clarence Darrow voiced this view in his courtroom defense of labor leader Big Bill Haywood, charged with ordering the assassination of the governor of Idaho:

I don't care how many wrongs they committed, I don't care how many crimes these weak, rough, rugged, unlettered men who often know no other power but the brute force of their strong right arm, who find themselves bound and confined and impaired whichever way they turn, who look up and worship the god of might as the only god that they know--I don't care how often they fail, how many brutalities they are guilty of. I know their cause is just.

=== Law enforcement sympathies ===
Examples of local government inaction before or after union violence include the Herrin Massacre, where the county sheriff was a member of the United Mine Workers, and did nothing to prevent or stop the killing of 21 nonstriking workers, after the strikebreakers had given up their weapons on a promise of safe passage out of the county.

During a nationwide Teamsters Union strike against UPS in 1987, the president of the Houston policeman's union faxed a message to all Houston police stations, urging them to stop UPS drivers, and "go into zero tolerance mode, to get the nonstriking drivers off the street.

=== Political support ===
On 12 October 1898, at Virden, Illinois, a crowd of strikers armed with rifles tried to prevent a railroad car of strikebreakers from disembarking, and 8 strikers and 6 strikebreakers died in the gunfight. Governor Tanner of Illinois ordered in the National Guard, and on his orders, the following day the Guard prevented the companies from bringing in more strikebreakers. Unable to continue operating, the companies gave in. The governor admitted that he had no legal authority for his action in preventing the arrival of strikebreakers, but said that he was doing the will of the people.

=== Employer reluctance to press charges ===
When local, state, or federal officials try to prosecute union violence, they sometimes find that employers are reluctant to cooperate, for fear of union reprisal.

== False flags and frameups ==
False flag operations are efforts to turn public opinion against an adversary, while pretending to be in the camp of that adversary. Historian J. Bernard Hogg observed of such operations as practiced in 1888:

A detective will join the ranks of the strikers and at once become an ardent champion of their cause. He is next found committing an aggravated assault upon some man or woman who has remained at work, thereby bringing down upon the heads of the officers and members of the assembly or union directly interested, the condemnation of all honest people, and aiding very materially to demoralize the organization and break their ranks.

Some labor spy agencies advertised their false flag operations; for example, Corporations Auxiliary Company, a labor spy agency which boasted 499 corporate clients in the early 1930s, told prospective clients,

In [the event other methods of sabotaging the union fail, our operative in the union] turns extremely radical. He asks for unreasonable things and keeps the union embroiled in trouble. If a strike comes, he will be the loudest man in the bunch, and will counsel violence and get somebody in trouble. The result will be that the union will be broken up.

Johnson County, Indiana Deputy Prosecutor Carlos Lam suggested in an email that Wisconsin's Governor Walker mount a "false flag" operation to make it appear that the union was committing violence in the 2011 Wisconsin protests. After initially claiming that his email account was hacked, Lam admitted to sending the suggestion and resigned. Governor Walker's office disclaimed support for the proposal.

During the Colorado Labor Wars, the Colorado National Guard had been called into the Cripple Creek Mining District to put down a strike, and Colorado National Guard leadership became concerned that the Mine Owners Association had not lived up to their agreement to cover the payroll of the soldiers. In February 1904, General Reardon ordered Major Ellison to shoot up one of the mines. When such violence occurred, the blame would be placed upon the union. In the dark of night, Major Ellison and Sergeant Gordon Walter fired sixty shots from their revolvers into the Vindicator and Lillie shaft house. The plan worked, and the mine owners paid up.

During the same strike, detectives were accused of attempting to frame union leaders for a plot to derail a train. A jury of non-union ranchers and timbermen unanimously acquitted three accused union men, and some testimony during the trial pointed at a plot by the detectives.

Frameups in labor disputes sometimes swung public opinion against the perpetrators. During a 1912 strike in Lawrence, Massachusetts, police acting on a tip discovered dynamite and blamed it on the union. National media echoed an anti-union message. Later the police revealed that the dynamite had been wrapped in a magazine addressed to the son of the former mayor. The man had received an unexplained payment from the largest of the employers. Exposed, the plot swung public sympathy to the union.

== See also ==
- Anti-union violence in the United States
- Labor spies
- List of strikes, in USA and the world
- Opposition to trade unions
- Union busting
- Union organizer
- Union violence

People

- Norris J. Nelson, Los Angeles City Council member, commenting on union violence
- Joseph Yablonski
