= Freedom from Union Violence Act =

The Freedom from Union Violence Act of 1997 and 2007 were identical bills proposed in the United States Congress. Their intended purpose was to amend the Hobbs Act and make violence committed in pursuit of labor union goals a federal crime. They would impose a fine of up to $100,000, 20 years imprisonment, or both, on labor unions that commit or threaten to use violence, extortion, or the obstruction of commerce in the furtherance of labor union goals and objectives.

The bills faced strong opposition from labor unions and others, especially for the clause that would disallow "obstruction of commerce," and failed to pass into law both times. Opponents noted that violence and extortion were already crimes, and argued that there was no need to pass a special law setting aside union violence and union extortion as being especially heinous.

== Background ==
The Hobbs Act, passed in 1946, was an anti-racketeering act intended to deter robbery and extortion across state lines. It was commonly used to prosecute unions involved in restraint-of-trade to intimidate management. In 1970, the federal government attempted to expand the Hobbs Act to be used against violence as well. The indictment was appealed all the way up to the Supreme Court, discussing whether the Hobbs Act could be construed to cover violence as well. In the 1973 Supreme Court case United States v. Enmons, the ruling declared that the Hobbs Act as written did not cover such incidents, and cited Congressional debates at the time of passage that it was not intended to. Still, nothing prevented a new law from being passed.

Proponents of the Freedom from Union Violence Act have attempted to portray the United States v. Enmons as giving legal immunity to unions who engage in violence, though such an interpretation is incorrect; violence would fall under normal state laws prohibiting such activity. For example, Nebraska Senator Carl Curtis wrote an article that a predecessor to FUVA in 1981 would "outlaw violence by unions" and that unions enjoyed "immunity (for) union officials from Federal prosecution for committing and threatening to commit acts of extortion and violence." However, the text of the court case, as well as commentary by lawyers, makes clear that no such immunity exists, merely that the Hobbs Act is the wrong vehicle to pursue such a case.

The National Right to Work Committee, a strong proponent of the FUVA, states:

The Freedom from Union Violence Act closes a loophole in the federal Hobbs Anti-Extortion Act, eliminating the special judicially-created exemption in this law for union-related violence and extortion and holding union officials to the same legal standards as other Americans.

This legislation would establish that the 1946 Hobbs Act applies to all Americans, including union officials seeking to advance so-called "legitimate union objectives." Present law offers this unique exemption for union officials.

NILRR union violence investigations have determined that union violence is responsible for at least 203 Americans deaths since 1975; 5,869 incidents of personal injury; and more than 6,435 incidents of vandalism and tens of millions of dollars in property damage.

However, opponents of FUVA claim that the existence of union violence has been greatly exaggerated. In a 2001 law review article by law professor Julius Getman and former Secretary of Labor Ray Marshall analyzed the evidence of union violence.

The claim that strike violence is "escalating" has no empirical basis. Even the study conducted by the National Institute for Labor Relations Research - cited regularly as authority for this proposition by FUVA's proponents - draws no such conclusion. And the study itself is a scholarly monstrosity that seeks to study union violence by compiling media reports, mainly newspaper articles concerning strike violence. The Institute admits that it did not actually investigate any of the incidents reported and does not know if the reports are accurate. It concludes: "Because it relies on news accounts the Institute cannot guarantee the accuracy of the file itself." In fact, articles about employer-instigated violence are included in the study's effort to determine union violence. n59 It seems obvious that the methodology employed confuses those strikes most written about with those most violent. Further, the Institute includes incidents of "psychological violence; i.e., intimidation, coercion and verbal threats" - terms which it does not bother to define. It seems clear, however, that this definition would include nonviolent civil disobedience of the type used by the civil rights movement and increasingly by the labor movement. But whatever the definition, it is almost certain that strike-related violence has decreased since the Enmons decision because the number of strikes has declined significantly.

== See also ==
- Union violence
- Anti-union violence
- Opposition to trade unions
- Wagner Act
- Hobbs Act
