= United States v. Enmons =

- Supreme Court of the United States

Argued December 4, 1972 Decided February 22, 1973
- Full case name: United States v. Enmons
- Citations: 410 U.S. 396 (more) 93 S. Ct. 1007; 35 L. Ed. 2d 379

Holding
- The Hobbs Act, which makes it a federal crime to obstruct interstate commerce by robbery or extortion, does not reach the use of violence (which is readily punishable under state law) to achieve legitimate union objectives.

Court membership
- Chief Justice Warren E. Burger Associate Justices William O. Douglas · William J. Brennan Jr. Potter Stewart · Byron White; Thurgood Marshall · Harry Blackmun; Lewis F. Powell Jr. · William Rehnquist

Case opinions
- Majority: Stewart, joined by Brennan, White, Marshall, Blackmun
- Concurrence: Blackmun
- Dissent: Douglas, joined by Burger, Powell, Rehnquist

Laws applied
- Hobbs Act

United States v. Enmons, 410 U.S. 396 (1973), was a United States Supreme Court case in which the Court held that the federal Anti-Racketeering Act of 1934, known as the Hobbs Act, does not cover union violence in furtherance of the union's objectives.

The case involved a labor strike in which members of the International Brotherhood of Electrical Workers (IBEW) fired rifles at three utility company transformers, drained the oil from another, and blew up a company substation. The labor union in question was seeking a higher-pay contract and other benefits from their employer, the Gulf States Utilities Company which is now part of Entergy. The federal government tried the defendants under the Hobbs Act.

The Court ruled that "The Hobbs Act, which makes it a federal crime to obstruct interstate commerce by robbery or extortion, does not reach the use of violence (which is readily punishable under state law) to achieve legitimate union objectives, such as higher wages in return for genuine services that the employer seeks."

== Details of the case ==
The indictment against the alleged conspirators charged them with being in violation of the Hobbs Act, which states that anyone attempting to affect or obstruct commerce through violence or the threat of violence against any person or property "shall be fined not more than $10,000 or imprisoned not more than twenty years, or both." The indictment argued that the union members obstructed commerce with their actions against the Utilities Company, and attempted to "obtain the property of [their employer] in the form of wages and other things of value" by using the wrongful use of force and the fear of economic loss.

The court acknowledged that using threats and force to obtain property is wrongful. However, the court reasoned that it is considered "wrongful" only when the perpetrator has no "legitimate claim" to it. Since federal law empowers unions with the right to strike, the use of violence to secure higher pay and benefits was not extortion. The case was dismissed. Such violent acts can, however, be punishable under state or federal laws other than extortion.

In understanding Enmons, it is important to keep in mind that what the Hobbs Act outlaws is extortion, not just any bad act. Federal law, in particular the National Labor Relations Act, says that collective bargaining and strikes in support of collective bargaining goals are legal and protected. Therefore, since collective bargaining has a purpose that is not extortion, one of the key elements of a Hobbs Act violation is not met.

== Reactions ==
Since 1973, a number of bills have been proposed by Republicans to overturn United States v. Enmons. The Freedom from Union Violence Act (FUVA) was first introduced by Rep. Phil Crane as H.R. 1796 on June 8, 1995, and was reintroduced three times; however, none of the bills made it out of committee.

The National Right to Work Foundation characterizes United States v. Enmons as an example of several "extraordinary powers and immunities" enjoyed by American labor unions, declaring: "union violence is exempted from the Hobbs Act, which makes it a federal crime to obstruct interstate commerce by robbery or extortion." However, Cohen and Yellig write: "The Enmons interpretation of extortion does not give carte blanche to hooligans and racketeers to threaten, destroy, or injure others under the protective shield of a labor dispute," and note that in such cases offenses are often charged under state and federal law. Cohen and Yellig also describe how debate on this matter often hinges on the definition and limits of extortion under federal law.

In 2001 law review article by law professor Julius Getman and former Secretary of Labor Ray Marshall, analyzed the evidence of union violence. They wrote: "the claim that strike violence is "escalating" has no empirical basis." They also argued that claims of increasing union violence are often based on flawed sources, such as newspaper reports, and often fail to distinguish between actual physical violence and events such as intimidation or verbal threats that may not rise to the level of actual violence.

== See also ==
- Entergy Corp. v. Riverkeeper Inc.
- Entergy Louisiana, Inc. v. Louisiana Public Service Commission
