= Entergy Louisiana, Inc. v. Louisiana Public Service Commission =

- Supreme Court of the United States

Argued April 28, 2003 Decided June 2, 2003
- Full case name: Entergy Louisiana, Inc. v. Louisiana Public Service Commission et al.
- Citations: 539 U.S. 39 (more) 123 S. Ct. 2050; 156 L. Ed. 2d 34

Case history
- Prior: 815 So.2d 27 (La. 2002); cert. granted, 537 U.S. 1152 (2003).

Holding
- Federal agency approved tariff that delegated to regulated entity the discretion to determine cost allocations between affiliated public utilities preempted under the filed rate doctrine a state public utilities commission rate order denying recovery of the costs as imprudent.

Court membership
- Chief Justice William Rehnquist Associate Justices John P. Stevens · Sandra Day O'Connor; Antonin Scalia · Anthony Kennedy; David Souter · Clarence Thomas; Ruth Bader Ginsburg · Stephen Breyer

Case opinion
- Majority: Thomas, joined by unanimous

Laws applied
- Federal Power Act, 16 U.S.C. § 824d(f)

Entergy Louisiana, Inc. v. Louisiana Public Service Commission, 539 U.S. 39 (2003), is a Supreme Court of the United States case holding that a federal administrative agency approved public utility tariff preempted a state public utilities commission rate order under the filed rate doctrine.

== Background ==
Entergy, a multistate holding company, allocated the costs of its electric generating capacity, including capacity held in extended reserve shutdown, among its five public utilities that it owned pursuant to a tariff schedule MSS-1 approved by the Federal Energy Regulatory Commission (FERC). The tariff delegated discretion to Entergy to determine the specific cost allocations. The resulting costs, which changed monthly, were then assigned under the Entergy System Operating Agreement to each of the five public utilities under an automatic adjustment clause in the tariff, so FERC review and approval of a specific cost allocation was not required.

In May 1997 Entergy Louisiana, Inc., one of the five public utilities, filed its annual retail electric rate case with the Louisiana Public Service Commission (PSC). The PSC issued an order disallowing the costs associated with the electric generating units in extended shutdown reserve from being recovered in rates. The PSC concluded that since FERC had never determined that the allocation of costs as determined by Entergy was consistent with the Entergy System Operating Agreement, it could make this prudency decision without violating the Supremacy Clause of the United States Constitution. As a result of this decision, Entergy Louisiana was required to pay the allocated costs of the extended shutdown reserve generation but could not recover these costs in its retail electric rates.

Entergy Louisiana appealed the PSC order to the Supreme Court of Louisiana. The state court upheld the PSC order as not being barred by federal preemption because the PSC was not attempting to regulate interstate wholesale electric rates. The court also noted that FERC never ruled on the issue of whether Entergy Louisiana's decision to include the extended shutdown reserve generating units was a prudent one or whether to include these costs in rates was mandatory.

== Opinion of the Court ==
The U.S. Supreme Court stated that it granted certiorari to determine whether its filed rate doctrine holdings in Nantahala Power and Light Co. v. Thornburg, 476 U.S. 953 (1986), and Mississippi Power and Light Co. v. Mississippi ex rel. Moore, 487 U.S. 354 (1988), would lead to federal preemption of the Louisiana PSC order. The filed rate doctrine is an American administrative law rule that a court should not permit a collateral attack on a tariffed rate of a public utility that was determined by an agency, and that any litigation regarding the validity of that rate must be conducted before that agency. With the Supremacy Clause, any tariffed rate approved by a federal agency must be given effect by a state public utility commission that regulates a public utility and sets intrastate rates.

Nantahala held that cost allocations related to a FERC approved power agreement must be followed by state agencies in setting public utility rates. In Mississippi Power, FERC had allocated the costs of the Grand Gulf Nuclear Generating Station among various public utility companies. The Supreme Court of Mississippi ruled that the state PSC could consider the prudence of the Grand Gulf costs allocated to a public utility since FERC had never ruled on the prudency of these costs. The U.S. Supreme Court disagreed, stating that FERC orders must be given preemptive effect regardless of whether a particular matter had been litigated and decided by FERC.

Applying the Nantahala and Mississippi Power holdings to the Louisiana case, the Court noted that the PSC order impermissibly had the effect of trapping generation costs with the public utility by excluding them from recovery in rates. Although the Entergy System Operating Agreement differed from the tariffs in the Nantahala and Mississippi Power cases in that it left the classification of reserve generating units to an operating committee, this delegated discretion did not allow the PSC room for a finding of imprudence where a FERC mandated cost allocation would not. As Congress had permitted the use of automatic adjustment clauses in the Federal Power Act, the Court decided the MSS-1 schedule constituted such a clause. The Court then determined that there was no reason to create an exception to the filed rate doctrine for tariffs using this type of clause.

The U.S. Supreme Court also stated that the Louisiana Supreme Court ruling regarding the ability of the PSC to conduct prudency reviews was the same erroneous reasoning advanced by the Mississippi Supreme Court in the Mississippi Power case. The Court explained that it did not matter whether FERC had specifically ruled on the reserve generating units, but only whether the FERC approved tariff dictated how and by whom that classification should be made. For these reasons, the decision of the state court was reversed.

== See also ==
- List of United States Supreme Court cases, volume 539
- Entergy Corp. v. Riverkeeper Inc.
- United States v. Enmons
