= Intake tower =

Vertical tubular structure for capturing water from reservoirs

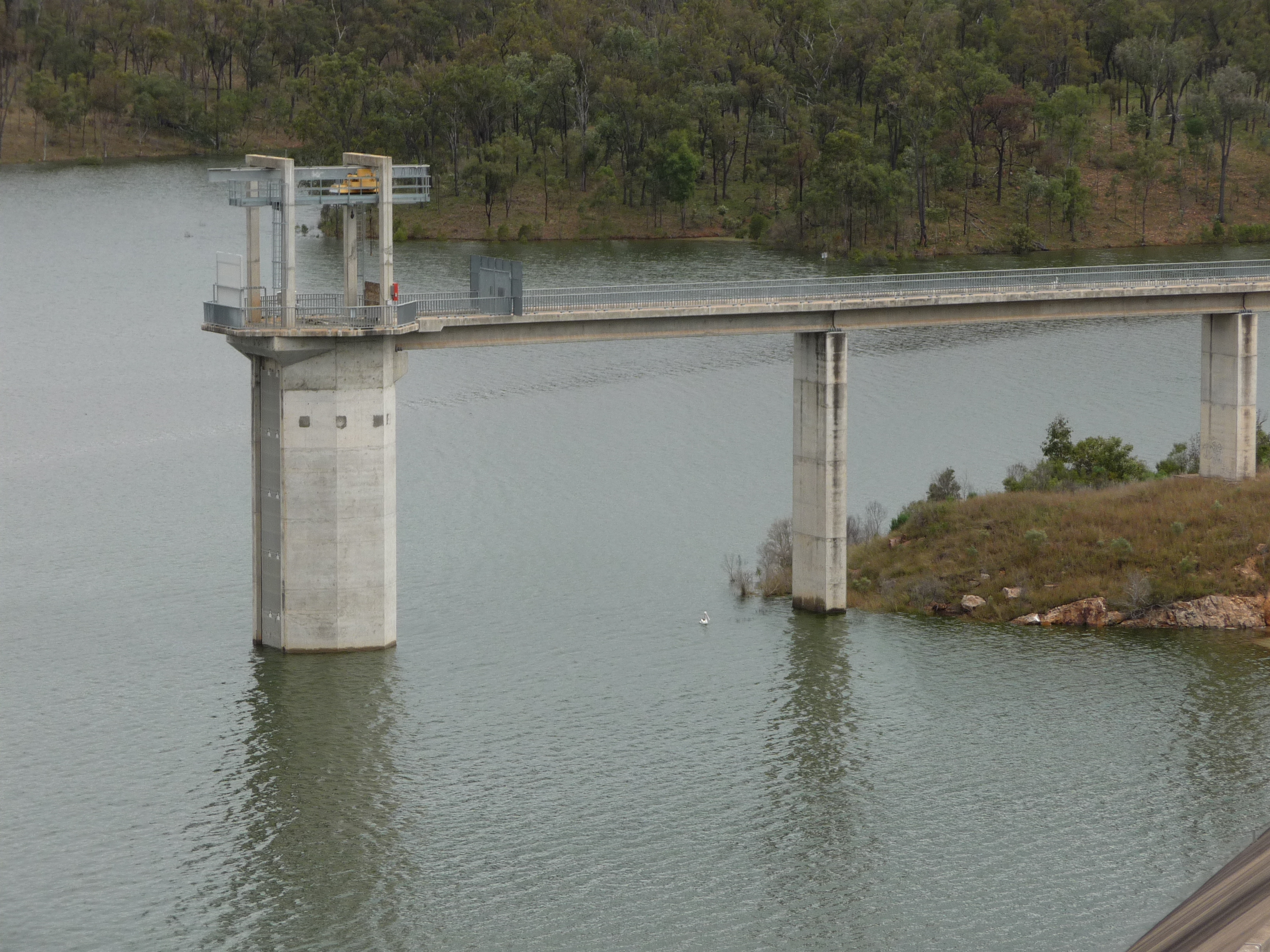
Intake tower connected to the shore with a service bridge at the Boondooma Dam, Australia

An intake tower or outlet tower is a vertical tubular structure with one or more openings used for capturing water from reservoirs and conveying it further to a hydroelectric or water-treatment plant.

Unlike spillways, intake towers are intended for the reservoir's regular operation, conveying clean, debris-free water for further use.

== Construction ==
An intake tower is typically made from reinforced concrete, with foundations laid in the river or lake bed. It has at least one water-collecting opening at the top, and may have additional openings along its height, depending on the purpose: towers for hydroelectric plants typically have only one inlet, while those in water-processing plants have multiple draw-off inlets. Near the bottom of the tower, depending on the dam construction and plant location, a horizontal or slanted outlet conduit takes the water from the tower into the plant.

The most convenient location for an intake tower is in the proximity of the processing plant. In artificial lakes, those are typically placed near the dam. Lake bed near the dam also provides sufficient water depth to ensure substantial supply to the towers throughout the year, thus the exposed towers can be regularly seen along the dams.

When built near the shore, an intake tower is equipped with a service bridge, used to gain access for maintenance.

=== Draw-off tower ===
Draw-off towers are intake towers specialized for drinking water reservoirs. They have multiple openings at various depths, typically equipped with valves, allowing drawing water only from the level where it is of highest quality.

There are many possible designs of intakes and gates on dams These include 1. Floating rafts with pumps. 2. Intakes off concrete dam walls. 3. Self standing towers, especially on embankment dams. 4. Tunnels and bores through embankment or mountain. 5. Intake towers in deep dams which are often circular to minimize stresses. 6. Square towers where pressures are low. 7. Dry towers if there must be valves and pumps accessible. 8. Wet towers where there is no equipment to access. 9. No tower, just inlets on the dam wall or embankment leading to a collecting pipeline.

The use of multiple valves in the intake tower with pipework, is space consuming and expensive. A minimum that is needed to minimize costs is a stoplog or plug in case access is needed. Flow control can be achieved with a valve on the downstream side of the dam wall. When that is closed the pressures on both sides of the stoplog or plug will equalize to enable the stopper to open.

== See also ==
- Culvert
- Fish screen
- Gatehouse (waterworks)
