= 1996 Parliament House riot =

Riot at Parliament House, Canberra, Australia

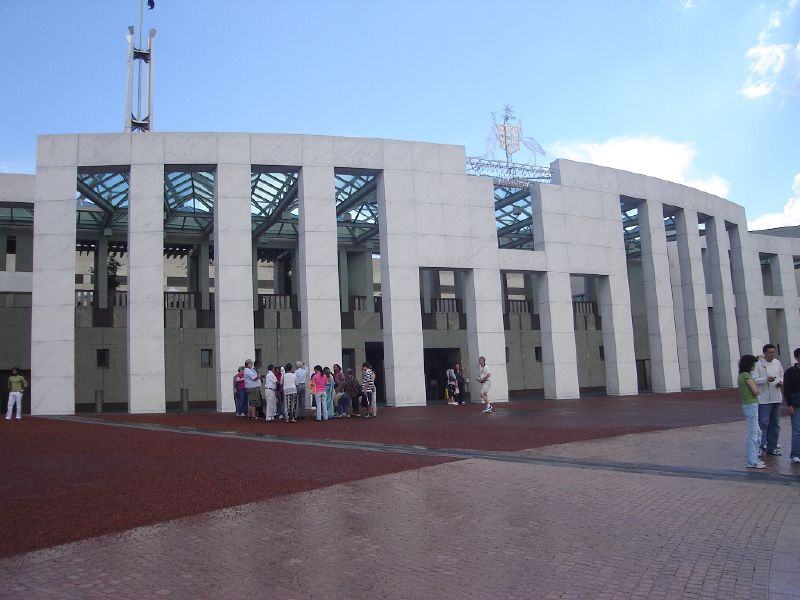
The entrance to Parliament House, Canberra – scene of the 1996 riot

The 1996 Parliament House riot (also called the Canberra riot), involved a physical attack on Parliament House, Canberra, Australia, on 19 August 1996. The riot followed the "Cavalcade to Canberra" protest rally organised by the Australian Council of Trade Unions (ACTU) against the Howard government's first Budget following the 1996 Australian federal election. The demonstrators injured 90 people while forcing their way into the Parliamentary foyer, looting the Parliamentary shop, attacking police and inflicting other damage on the building.

== Overview ==
The Australian Council of Trade Unions called the "cavalcade to Canberra" rally to protest against the proposed budget cuts and industrial relations reform agenda of the Liberal-National Coalition Howard government. According to then President of the Senate, Margaret Reid, the initially peaceful protest deteriorated into violent action when a new group of demonstrators arrived in the early afternoon and, joined by people from the main protest, attacked the entrance to Parliament. Around 90 personnel were injured —including lacerations, sprains, and head and eye injuries. Damage to the forecourt and foyer of Parliament was initially estimated at $75,000 and the Parliamentary shop was looted. Nine rioters were arrested and charged with a variety of offences.

== Background ==
Industrial relations reform had been a key issue canvassed by Liberal Leader John Howard in the 1996 Australian Federal election campaign. Elements of the reforms had been opposed by the Labor Party and Union movement. During the election campaign, ACTU Secretary, Bill Kelty, had threatened 'industrial war' if a Coalition Government tried to challenge union power.

The newly elected Howard government proposed to balance the Australian federal budget by means of extensive budget cuts, and introduced a draft Workplace Relations Amendment Bill which proposed to curtail 'compulsory unionism' and to introduce a more decentralised bargaining structure to the Australian work place. In response, the Labor Party aligned Australian Council of Trade Unions organised a campaign of protest to culminate on the eve of the federal budget, 19 August 1996 with a protest rally on the lawns of the Federal Parliament, called the "Cavalcade to Canberra".

== The protest ==
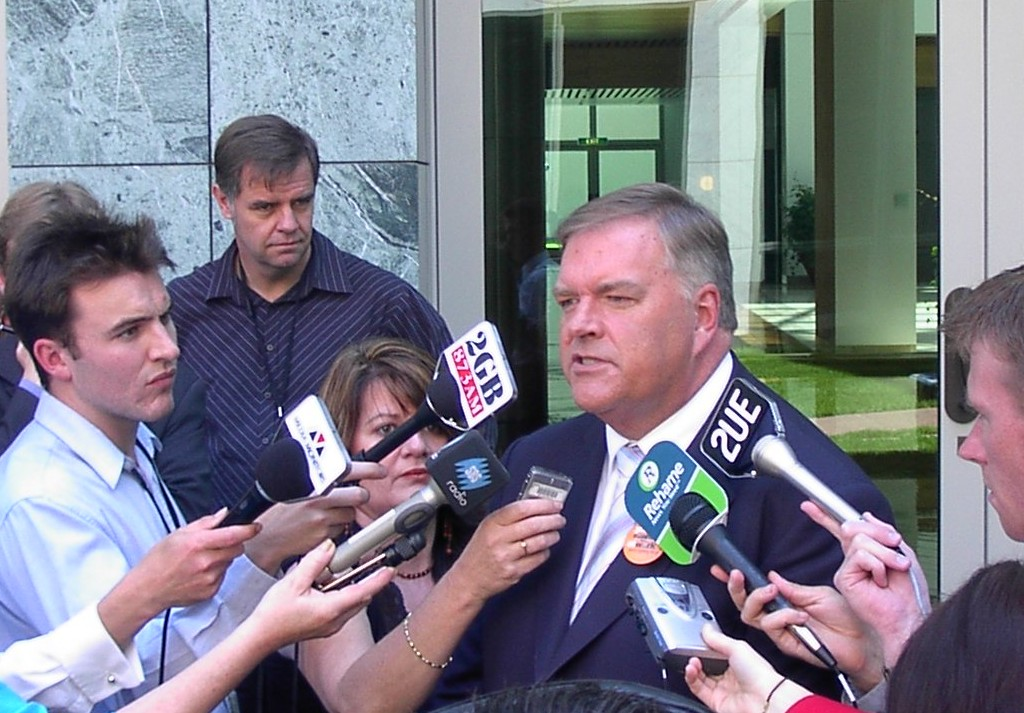
Opposition Leader Kim Beazley

On 4 July 1996, the Australian Capital Territory Trades and Labour Council advised the Speaker and President of the Parliament that a rally would be held at Parliament House on Monday, 19 August and requested permission to conduct a march around the Parliament building. The march was approved for between 1:35 pm and 2:25 pm, provided adequate marshalling was organised and that the demonstration did not obstruct access to Parliament. Subsequent discussions were also conducted with the Construction, Forestry, Mining and Energy Union and the indigenous representatives and all agreed to these parameters for the demonstration.

On the day of 19 August, the protest began with senior Australian Trade Union officials including ACTU President Jennie George and Assistant Secretary Greg Combet, along with Labor Opposition Leader Kim Beazley, Greens Leader Bob Brown and Democrats Leader Cheryl Kernot rallying demonstrators against the Government from a podium. Beazley told protesters: "[The Howard government] hates workers, it hates students, it hates Aboriginal people, it hates women...", while Brown promised to "bury" the Government's industrial relations Bill.

The protest rally remained peaceful until about 12:20 pm at which point a new group of demonstrators entered the parliamentary precinct.

== The riot ==
On 20 August, the President of the Australian Senate gave the following account of the riot:

[T]his group refused to accept police direction, forced a breach in police lines and ran towards the main front entrance of Parliament House. Unfortunately, it was apparent that some of these demonstrators were affected by alcohol. This group was supported by participants from the more general demonstration who were incited to join those involved in riotous conduct by a speaker from the official platform.

Police formed a protective line along the perimeter of the Great Verandah which was subsequently forced back to the main doors. The police line was withdrawn from this area due to the level of violence being experienced by officers and was redeployed to an area inside the front doors in support of parliamentary security personnel. This deployment stabilised the situation for a short period. However, demonstrators using increasing force broke through the first line of doors.

Once inside this area, demonstrators used weapons, including a large hammer, a wheel brace, a steel trolley and a stanchion torn from the external doors to break open the internal doors. Simultaneously, a second group of demonstrators used other weapons to break into the Parliament House shop, but were held at the internal doors. The shop was ransacked by demonstrators and major damage was caused by persons who subsequently occupied the area. After some two hours, the demonstrators were finally repelled from Parliament House and driven back onto the forecourt area and, shortly afterwards, they dispersed.

In addition to the events which took place at the front entrance to the building, incidents also occurred on the Members Terrace, the roof of the Great Verandah and the Queens Terrace. There were 197 Australian Federal Police on duty at the start of the demonstration, in addition to the Australian Protective Service officers and parliamentary security personnel. A further 60 Australian Federal Police reinforcements were called out under established contingency plans.

The Irish Times reported that protesters threw acid and urine at more than 300 riot police who were called in to control the violence, after about 25,000 trade union members and Aboriginal protesters marched on Parliament. More than 60 police were injured and 50 people arrested, while "the Parliament House entrance, marble hall and souvenir shop were turned into a battle zone...". Prime Minister Howard condemned the violence and said "I want to make it perfectly clear that never, under any circumstances, will my government buckle to threats of physical violence or behaviour of this kind."

Treasurer Peter Costello was locked down in his office by the Federal Police, as rioters stormed Parliament. Some 90 personnel had reported injuries by the following day, including lacerations, sprains, and head and eye injuries. Nurses treated 40 injured people on the floor of the foyer. During the course of the riot, unionist Davie Thomason, of the CFMEU, took the podium at the official rally with a bloodied face and spoke while shaking a police riot shield, saying to cheers from other protesters:

[T]he CFMEU and other organisations from the construction division, 100 of us have got into our House. And look what we got from the coppers. And we have to remember it's going to be a long haul but these people up here will never defeat us, we have to remember that ... Workers, united, will never be defeated.

== Aftermath and legacy ==
Addressing the Senate the following day, Senator Robert Hill, leader of the Government in the Senate, described the event as a "very sad day in the history of the Australian political process", and his opposition counterpart Senator John Faulkner condemned the "appalling violence" on behalf of the opposition. Senator Cheryl Kernot for the Australian Democrats said she "condemned" the violence and "I deplore the actions of those who, in my opinion, selfishly and deliberately chose to distract from discussion of the issues". Senator Dee Margetts, speaking for the Greens Western Australia said that "the Greens WA do not associate ourselves with the violent action" but that "there are obviously some in the Greens movement who have differing opinions about that".

In the House of Representatives, Opposition Leader Kim Beazley called the rioters "lunatics" and "louts" who had distracted from a "peaceful and lawful" protest, while Prime Minister John Howard described the violence as "thuggery" and said that the ACTU should accept some responsibility for the riot:

Those who organise demonstrations have a responsibility to stop them getting out of hand, and it is utterly disingenuous of the Australian Council of Trade Unions to pretend that it can accept no responsibility at all for what happened yesterday.

== See also ==
- Union violence
- Keating government
