= Gatehouse (waterworks) =

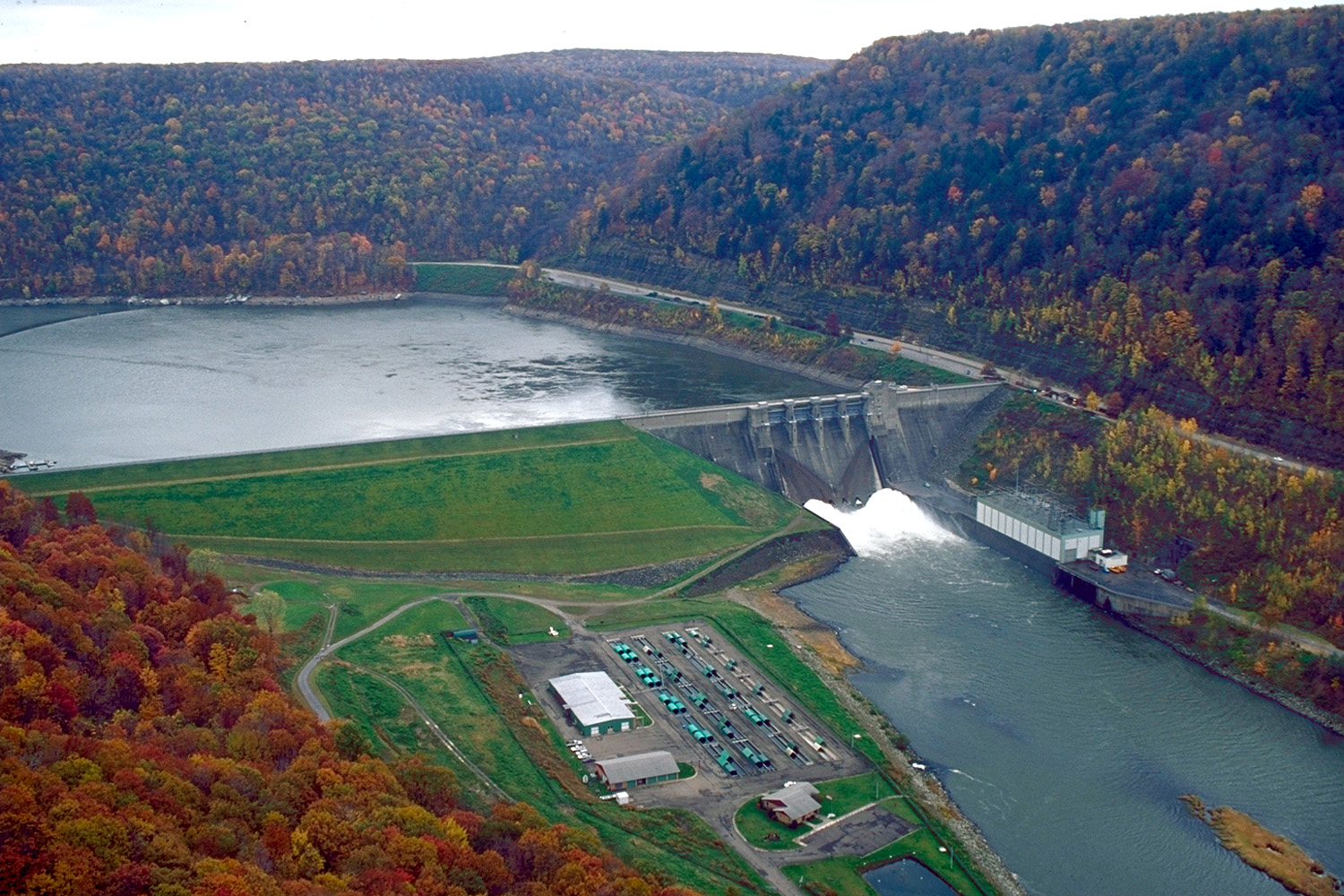
The Kinzua Dam in Pennsylvania, with outlet works releasing water.

A gatehouse, gate house, outlet works or valve house for a dam is a structure housing sluice gates, valves, or pumps (in which case it is more accurately called a pumping station). Many gatehouses are strictly utilitarian, but especially in the nineteenth century, some were very elaborate.

== Background ==
A set of outlet works is a device used to release and regulate water flow from a dam. Such devices usually consist of one or more pipes or tunnels through the embankment of the dam, directing water usually under high pressure to the river downstream. These structures are usually used when river flow exceeds the capacity of the power plant or diversion capacity of the dam, but is not high enough to warrant use of the dam spillways. They may also be used when river flows must be bypassed due to maintenance work in the power station or diversion gates. Although similar in purpose to spillways, outlet works provide a more controlled release to meet downstream flow requirements.

A typical set of outlet works begins in an intake structure, which is usually a canal or intake tower. A regulating gate or valve controls water flow into the pipes of the outlet works, which discharge downstream into a stilling basin or directly into the river. The inlets of the outlet works may consist of either gates or valves, or be composed of a more primitive system of stoplogs. Inlets may also contain a series of other devices for different purposes, including trash racks and fish screens.

== See also ==
- Category:Gatehouses (waterworks) – listing notable examples
