= Entergy Corp. v. Riverkeeper Inc. =

Entergy Corp. v. Riverkeeper, Inc.
- Supreme Court of the United States

Argued December 2, 2008 Decided April 1, 2009
- Full case name: Entergy Corp. v. Riverkeeper, Inc., et al.
- Docket no.: 07-588
- Citations: 556 U.S. 208 (more) 129 S. Ct. 1498; 173 L. Ed. 2d 369; 2009 U.S. LEXIS 2498

Case history
- Prior: 475 F.3d 83 (2d Cir. 2007)

Holding
- The EPA permissibly relied on cost-benefit analysis in setting the national performance standards in providing for cost-benefit variances from the standards, as part of the Phase II regulations.

Court membership
- Chief Justice John Roberts Associate Justices John P. Stevens · Antonin Scalia; Anthony Kennedy · David Souter; Clarence Thomas · Ruth Bader Ginsburg; Stephen Breyer · Samuel Alito

Case opinions
- Majority: Scalia, joined by Roberts, Kennedy, Thomas, Alito
- Concur/dissent: Breyer
- Dissent: Stevens, joined by Souter, Ginsburg

Laws applied
- Clean Water Act

Entergy Corp. v. Riverkeeper, Inc., 556 U.S. 208 (2009), is a decision by the United States Supreme Court that reviewed the Environmental Protection Agency's (EPA) interpretation of the Clean Water Act regulations with regard to cooling water intakes for power plants. Existing facilities are mandated to use the "Best Technology Available" to "minimize the adverse environmental impact." The issue was whether the agency may use a cost–benefit analysis (CBA) in choosing the Best Available Technology or (BAT) to meet the National Performance Standards (NPS).

Reversing a lower court opinion, the 5-1-3 ruling upheld the EPA's decision as reasonable to allow CBA to determine the best technology available to maintain national environmental standards.

== Parties ==
Petitioner: Entergy Corporation is an energy company engaged primarily in electric power production and retail electric distribution operations. Entergy owns and operates both nuclear and fossil fuel power plants generating an aggregated 30,000 megawatts of electrical capacity. Indian Point Energy Center is a subsidiary of Entergy Corporation operating a three-unit nuclear power plant in Buchanan, New York, the facility at issue in this case.

Respondent: Riverkeeper is a member-supported environmental protection organization dedicated to defending the Hudson River and its tributaries for New York City and Hudson Valley residents. Over the past four decades Riverkeeper has been successful as the public's watchdog in bringing hundreds of pollution violations to justice and protecting drinking water for local communities. Riverkeeper has an ongoing interest in replacing Indian Point nuclear power plant with renewable energy.

This case is a consolidation of three cases for review by the Supreme Court Entergy Corporation v. Riverkeeper, Inc., et al. PSEG Fossil LLC, et al., v. Riverkeeper, Inc., et al. Utility Water Act Group, v. Riverkeeper, Inc., et al.

== Background ==
Among the ten major environmental regulatory statutes enacted from the 1960s through the 1980s only the Toxic Substances Control Act (TSCA) and the Federal Insecticide, Fungicide, and Rodenticide Act (FIFRA) granted authority to weigh the cost and benefits in determining policy requirements. The remainder of the regulations rely mainly on harm-based or technology-based methodologies that clearly exclude cost–benefit analysis (CBA) or at a minimum do not provide for it. The Clean Water Act statute uses technology based methods to meet its standards. (See Note 1.)

Three pre-Entergy Supreme Court decisions offer historical guidance into the possible crafting of the CBA canon. Each of them address the priority of environmental health and safety concerns with the appropriate level of cost-benefit analysis.

- In Tennessee Valley Authority v. Hill the Court interpreted section 7 of the Endangered Species Act as discontinuing the construction of the Tellico Dam after the project was more than 80 percent complete and had spent over $50 million in order to save the snail darter (an unknown species at the time).
- In American Textile Manufacturers Institute, Inc. v. Donovan the court addressed whether the Occupational Safety and Health Administration (OSHA) could adopt cost–benefit analysis with regards to cotton dust standards for employees. The Court ruled that CBA was not authorized by the statute because feasibility analysis was authorized.
- In Whitman v. American Trucking Associations, Inc., the Court held that section 109 of the Clean Air Act (CAA) prohibited cost considerations when setting the National Ambient Air Quality Standards (NAAQS) In a unanimous Court, Justice Scalia considered that section 109 requires the public to be protected with "an adequate margin of safety" and that the CAA had specific reference to cost considerations in related provisions but not with setting the NAAQS.

Various States and environmental groups challenged the Bush Administration Environmental Protection Agency's (EPA) interpretation of § 316(b) of the Clean Water Act (CWA), 33 U.S.C. §1326(b), that allowed exceptions to power plants that diverged from national standards. The claim against the EPA was that the agency unreasonably interpreted the regulations of the CWA when it determined that cost–benefit analysis was a method that could be used to determine the BAT when minimizing the adverse effects of cooling water intakes from power plants. This new interpretation of the statute allows for cost to influence the choice of "best technology available" lowering the standard reduction of "adverse environmental impact."

== Statute and regulations ==
Section 316(b) of the Clean Water Act requires that permittees under the National Pollutant Discharge Elimination System (NPDES) that operate facilities with cooling water intake structures ensure that the location, design, construction, and capacity of their structures reflect the best technology available to minimize detrimental impacts to the environment. The intake structures remove billions of aquatic organisms each year from United States waterways. Most impacts are in early life stages of fish, crustaceans, and other aquatic life.

== Prior case ==
The case preceding this Supreme Court case was decided in the Second Circuit Court of Appeals. This court heard Riverkeeper, Inc. v. EPA, in 2006 and decided the case in 2007. Then-Circuit Judge Sotomayor wrote the opinion for the court. In this decision the court stated that in order to meet the statute facilities could not use restoration enhancements (restocking fish, restoring habitat, etc.) to meet the National Performance Standard (NPS). Additionally, the court remanded the case to the EPA for clarification of EPA rules regarding NPS determination by CBA and the use of a variance for facilities claiming excessive costs to implement mandated technology. And most importantly to this case, the court decided that a CBA is not consistent with the requirement of using the best technology available for minimizing adverse environmental impact. The statutory language requires the EPA's selection of BAT be driven by technology. Cost can only be used to determine if remediation can be reasonably borne by the industry and determining the specific technology that meets the standards at the lowest cost. Thus suspending this aspect of Phase II as stated above.

== This case ==
The petitioner's power plants had cooling water intake structures that threatened freshwater aquatic life by compression against intake screens (impingement) or by suctioning organisms into the cooling system (entrainment). They challenged the Second Circuit decision that cost benefit analysis cannot be used in the interpretation of the Clean Water Act in determination of the national performance standard and best available technology for existing power plants.

The respondents supported the Second Circuit's finding that the EPA's decision of site-specific cost–benefit variance provision and the use of CBA to determine national performance standard and best available technology for existing facilities is not within the statute and remand the regulations to the agency for clarification.

== Adverse environmental impact ==
The process of pulling water into a facility from a natural body of water for use in industrial cooling can have a significant effect on living organisms in that body of water. Estimates for 2004 show that in just one day industry can pull as much as 279 million US gallons (1,060,000 m^{3}) of water into facilities for cooling purposes. The pressure and flow of this large volume of water can impinge large organisms like fish against intake points or entrain small organisms like plankton, eggs and larvae into the cooling system killing or injuring them. A single power plant can impinge a million adult fish in just three weeks. One plant can entrain some 3 - 4 billion smaller fish and shellfish in a year. This can have a destabilizing effect on local ecosystems. Nationwide, "the impingement and entrainment reduction benefits range from $73 million to $83 million per year. These benefits are primarily from improvements to commercial and recreational fishing." There are likely other benefits externalized in this equation such as higher functioning ecosystems, intrinsic value of non-fisheries species to name two. In light of these findings, when congress amended the Clean Water Act in 1972, it directed the EPA to regulate these systems so as to "minimize adverse environmental impact". As of 2014, there were 1065 existing facilities in the US that draw at least 2 million US gallons (7,600 m^{3}) a day. EPA estimated that 521 are manufacturing facilities and 544 are power plants.

== EPA rule making ==
Three Phases (rules) have been created over the years by the EPA in response from industry, environmental groups and judicial review to clarify exactly what is needed to meet the statute. Promulgated 1326(b) regulations making the best technology available determination on a case-by-case basis for both Phase I and Phase II facilities.

- Phase I regulations (created in 2001) govern new cooling water intake structures and mandate closed-cycle cooling systems as BAT.
- Phase II (2004) regulations apply generally to large existing facilities and outlines alternatives to closed-cycle cooling to meet reduction standards.
- Phase III (2006) addresses certain existing facilities and new coastal and offshore facilities, not an issue in this case.

The National Performance Standard (NPS), set by the EPA for new facilities is closed-cycle cooling systems, which can reduce impingement and entrainment by up to 98%. For existing facilities NPS in Phase II is "to reduce impingement mortality for all life stages of fish and shellfish by 80 to 95 percent from the calculation baseline; a subset of facilities must also reduce entrainment of such aquatic organisms by 60 to 90 percent from the calculation baseline."

In Phase II the EPA declined to specifically mandate closed-cycle cooling systems as BAT for existing facilities due to the compliant cost, which could be nine times the amount of other methods of reduction approaching the same standard. A cost–benefit analysis is incorporated to determine the standard. Existing facilities have alternatives to meet these reduction standards including existing technologies, additional fish protection technologies, and restoration measures. Phase II rules outline these alternatives and also permit site-specific variances from the NPS and if the permitting agency imposes restrictions that render results "as close to practical to the applicable performance standards", using "Best Professional Judgement".

Phase II update: In 2007 "EPA suspended the Cooling Water Intake Structure Regulations for existing large power plants as an unreasonable interpretation of the statute. This suspension was in response to the 2nd Circuit Court of Appeals decision in Riverkeeper, Inc., v. EPA. (2007)" (see below for details). In 2011 the Supreme Court ruling stated that Phase II was a reasonable interpretation of the statute reversing the lower court ruling allowing the use of Phase II.

== Main issue - Best Available Technology - BAT ==
The main issue for the court was to decide if the Clean Water Act statute language is unambiguous or not and whether the EPA interpretations (rules - see below) were reasonable. At the heart of the issue is if the EPA is authorized to consider CBA in determining BAT when meeting the NPS to "minimize adverse environmental impact."

The EPA does not dictate what type of system existing facilities need to use, but determines the standard that must be met. As guidance they use the terminology "Best Available Technology" which is defined here as "Any standard ... applicable to a point source shall require that the location, design, construction, and capacity of cooling water intake structures reflect the best technology available for minimizing adverse environmental impact." Existing power plants of this type need to use an appropriate system that is the BAT that meets the standard of reduction. The EPA works with each facility to ensure compliance on a site by site basis and can issue variance under specific circumstances. The definition for BAT in the Clean Water Act does not include a CBA as part of the criteria for choosing this technology as it does in definitions of other types of technology for meeting different environmental health standards.

== Decision ==
The judgment of the court of appeals is reversed and remanded.

Justice Scalia delivers the opinion of the court.

In a five justice majority opinion written by Justice Scalia, the Court overturns the Second Circuit's ruling and found that Congress did not speak directly to whether or not cost–benefit analysis could be used in environmental standards under the "best technology available" verbiage. And found that the EPA's interpretation of the regulations to be reasonable. Four different CWA tests were mentioned in the opinion, however two received greater attention. One called for the use of "best available technology economically achievable" (BATEA) and the other test required the "best available demonstrated control technology" (BADT). The BATEA test was intended to allow progress toward the goal of eliminating the discharge of all pollutants. While the BADT test was applicable to new point sources and was aimed to advance the strategy of "where practicable", a standard allowing no pollutant discharges. The Court differentiated the BAT test from other tests on the basis of distinguishable language and interpreted the ambiguity to allow the agency greater discretion in determining the content of the test. (See Note 2.)

In Whitman v. American Trucking Associations, Inc. the Court ruled that Congress was "unambiguously barred cost considerations" in setting air quality standards under section 109 of the Clean Air Act (CAA). The statute was silent on the issue because it had expressly allowed for the consideration of costs in other provisions of the act. However, concerning the CWA in regards to Entergy, the Court determined that statutory silence was not intended to limit the agency's discretion in consideration of a cost–benefit analysis when determining compliance with national environmental standards.

After determining that the statutes did not specifically address the "best technology available" language contained in the Clean Water Act, the second test was to determine if the agency's interpretation of the regulation was reasonable. This was in reference to the U.S. Supreme Courts decision in Chevron U.S.A., Inc. v. Natural Resources Defense Council, Inc. otherwise known as "Chevron deference". This case granted deference to the administrative agency's interpretation of its own regulations if the congressional intent was unclear. Although the court did not address the quality of the agency's interpretation in Entergy, it did find EPA to be reasonable in its interpretation.

Justice Breyer concurring in part and dissenting in part.

Although Justice Breyer agrees with the Court concerning the use of a cost–benefit analysis in determining environmental standards for water-intake systems, he also admonished the EPA for changing its stance on granting variances. Justice Breyer would have remanded the case to allow the EPA to explain the reasoning behind the change. In siding with the majority in Entergy, Justice Breyer acknowledges that Congress had a reason to limit the weight of cost–benefit analysis for the following reasons. It may delay regulatory process, undervalue the true cost benefit of environmental externalities, and may reduce market incentives to developing advanced treatment technologies. However, on the other hand, forbidding CBA may lead to "irrational results" and since every "real choice" requires a comparison, an absolute prohibition would be difficult to enforce.

Justice Stevens, with whom Justice Souter and Justice Ginsburg join, dissenting.

Justice Stevens believed that Section 316(b) of the CWA prohibited the use of cost-benefit analysis based on the language and stated that Congress' intent was to play a temporal role for existing power plants until a more ambitious standard could be set. And declared that if a cost–benefit analysis were to be done, monetize all aquatic life not just the 1.8 percent believed to have commercial or recreational value. EPA's estimate of aquatic life value was $83 million for less than 2% of aquatic life as opposed to a measured $735 million for all aquatic life.

Held: The EPA permissibly relied on cost–benefit analysis in setting the national performance standards in providing for cost–benefit variances from those standards as part of the Phase II regulations. EPA's perspective is that 1326(b)'s "best technology available for minimizing adverse environmental impact" standard permits consideration of the technology costs and the relationship between the added cost and the related environmental benefit. EPA needs to demonstrate that it has a reasonable interpretation of the statute, not necessarily the only possible interpretation or even the interpretation deemed best by the courts.

== Future implications ==
- The United States Supreme Court issued an important decision interpreting Federal Water Pollution Control Act section 316(b) to allow the United States Environmental Protection Agency to include cost/benefit considerations in establishing technology-based requirements for cooling water intake structures.
- Part of EPA's Phase II regulations are upheld so there will be greater regulatory certainty for industry and federal and state agencies. With this judgment here will also be greater regulatory flexibility for industry. However, this regulatory flexibility also may result in significant environmental harm as facilities are not required to implement technology that arguably is the most protective of the nation's waterways.
- New EPA Rule. As a result of the Supreme Court remand, EPA issued a final rule in 2014 to further clarify requirements for cooling water intake structures at existing power plants and factories. The rule affects about 1065 existing facilities, and requires them to select one of seven technology options.
- Entergy v Riverkeeper designates an important move in the Court's orientation towards increasing the weight of CBA with Environmental Health and Safety (EHS) regulations. Entergy joins a list of recent Supreme Court rulings that seem aimed at rebalancing the perceived excesses of strict EHS legislation of the 1960s, 1970s, and the 1980s Five major environmental decisions from 2008 to 2009, including Entergy, have resulted in adverse environmental decisions. Four of the five preserved executive branch judgments that precluded environmental protections. (See Note 3.)

== See also ==
- Entergy Louisiana, Inc. v. Louisiana Public Service Commission
- United States v. Enmons

== Notes ==
- Note 1: Statutes enacted during this period that did not authorize CBA include the Clean Water Act, 33 U.S.C. §§ 1251–1387 (2006); Clean Air Act, 42 U.S.C. §§ 401–7671q (2006); Endangered Species Act, 16 U.S.C. §§ 1531–1544 (2006); Comprehensive Environmental Response, Compensation, and Liability Act, 42 U.S.C. §§ 9601–9675; Safe Drinking Water Act (pre-1996 amendments), Pub. L. No. 93-523, 88 Stat. 1660 (1994); Resource Conservation and Recovery Act, 42 U.S.C. §§ 6901–6986; Emergency Planning and Community Right-to-Know Act, 42 U.S.C. §§ 11001–05, 11021–23, 11041–050; and the Oil Pollution Act of 1990, 33 U.S.C. §§ 2701–2762.
- Note 2: In section 316(b)’s BAT requirement for water intake structures, the CWA establishes a range of pollution reduction standards for various categories of dischargers and pollutants; these standards, in general order of ascending stringency, include best practicable technology (“BPT”), best conventional technology (“BCT”), best available technology economically achievable (“BATEA”), and best available demonstrated technology (“BADT”).156 The statutory factors for BPT and BCT expressly include consideration of the relationship between costs and benefits; the statutory factors for BATEA and BADT do not.
- Note 3: See Winter v. Natural Res. Def. Council, 129 S. Ct. 365 (2008) (invalidating lower court injunction protecting whales from military sonar tests); Entergy Corp. v. Riverkeeper, Inc., 129 S. Ct. 1498 (2009) (upholding EPA's use of CBA to select less protective standard for cooling water structures); Coeur Alaska, Inc. v. Se. Alaska Conservation Council, 129 S. Ct. 2458 (2009) (upholding less protective interpretation of CWA requirements for gold mine discharges); Burlington N. & Santa Fe Ry. Co. v. United States, 129 S. Ct. 1870 (2009) (limiting scope of liability under CERCLA); Summers v. Earth Island Inst., 129 S. Ct. 1142 (2009) (denying standing to environmental plaintiffs).
