= Bullpen (disambiguation) =

A bullpen or bull pen may refer to:

- Literally, a pen or enclosure for bulls
- In baseball, the bullpen, an area for pitchers to warm up, also the location of relief pitchers
- A fortified ridge at the Siege of Port Hudson
- Broadly, any group of people kept together or in reserve for a common goal, such as the staff of Marvel Comics' Bullpen Bulletins

Open areas holding large groups of people, such as:

- The bull pen or bull system, where Australian waterfront workers' under the Dog collar act were hired for the day
- An open plan office layout, especially that of local law enforcement
- The fan zone of NRG Stadium
- A round pen with solid-walled sides for training horses
- A holding cell that contains a large number of prisoners
- A prison yard or open area where prisoners are held
- An open area in a prison camp
- A system of prostitution, credited to Jean O'Hara, where a single prostitute would work three rooms in rotation

== See also ==
- Toril (disambiguation)
