= Fish screen =

Device to prevent the passage of fish

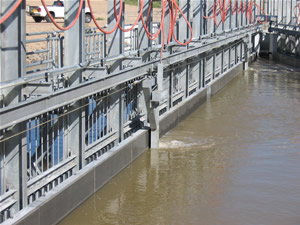
Fish screen at Redlands Canal, near Grand Junction, Colorado

A fish screen is a barrier to prevent fish from swimming or being drawn into an aqueduct, cooling water intake, dam intake tower, or other diversion on a river, lake, reservoir, or waterway where water is taken for human use. It supplies debris-free water with limited harm to aquatic life.

Fish screens are typically installed to protect endangered species that would otherwise be harmed or killed when passing through industrial facilities such as steam electric power plants, hydroelectric generators, petroleum refineries, chemical plants, farm irrigation water and municipal drinking water treatment plants. However, many fish are killed or injured on screens or elsewhere in the intake structures.

== Design ==
=== Industrial facilities ===
Fish screens may be positive barriers (devices such as a perforated metal plate that physically prevents fish from passing) or behavioral barriers (devices that encourage fish to swim away). Most behavioral barriers are experimental and of unproven effectiveness.

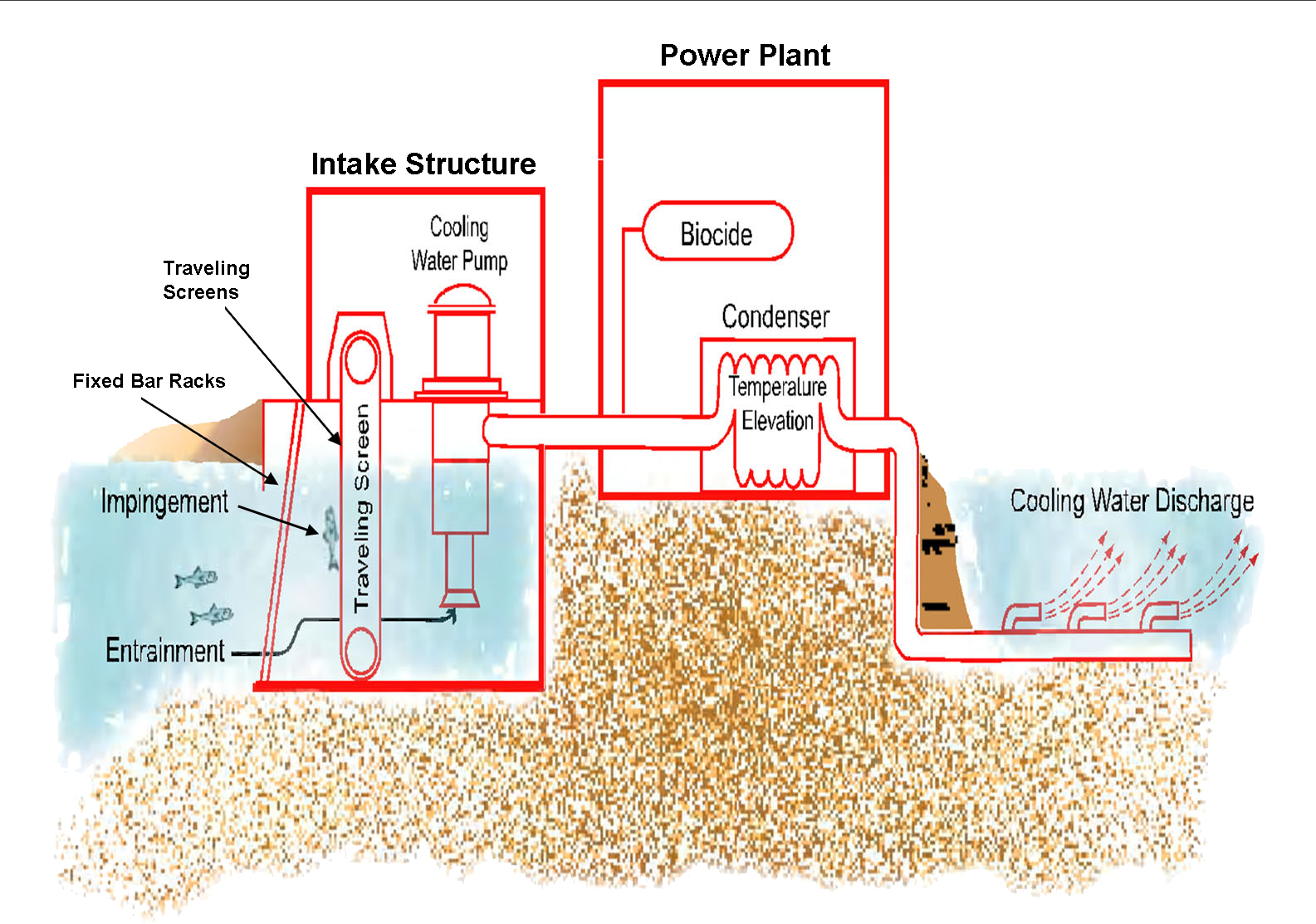
Diagram of typical vertical traveling screens used with industrial cooling water intake structures

Positive barriers are often effective at keeping aquatic organisms from entering a cooling system, but may also kill some by impinging them on the screens. Widely used barriers include:

- Modified traveling screens
- Fish handling and return systems
- Horizontal, flat-plate screens with bypass water return systems
- Cylindrical wedge wire screens
- Fine-mesh screens
- Fish net barriers.

Besides simply preventing fish from passing, fish screens are designed to minimize stress and injury that occur when fish impact the screen or are subjected to changes in water velocity and direction caused by the diversion.

The U.S. Environmental Protection Agency (EPA) has evaluated other barrier technologies and identified some as potentially effective, although not widely demonstrated (as of 2004):

- Aquatic microfiltration barriers
- Angled and modular inclined screens
- Velocity caps.

Some screens are capable of protecting more than one species or type of life; others are designed to protect a single species of fish (for example, salmon) and are not necessarily effective at protecting other fish species. Additionally, some screens may effectively protect juvenile and adult fish, but not fish eggs and larvae.

The cost of a fish screen varies from thousands of US dollars for small, low-flow-rate screens to millions for very large custom-designed high-flow systems. Maintenance costs include repairs, removing trash, and adjusting screens for changes in stream conditions.

=== Non-industrial applications ===
Screens are available for low volume, non-industrial water diversion applications that have no moving parts, do not require electricity, and have very little need for maintenance.

== Impacts on aquatic life ==
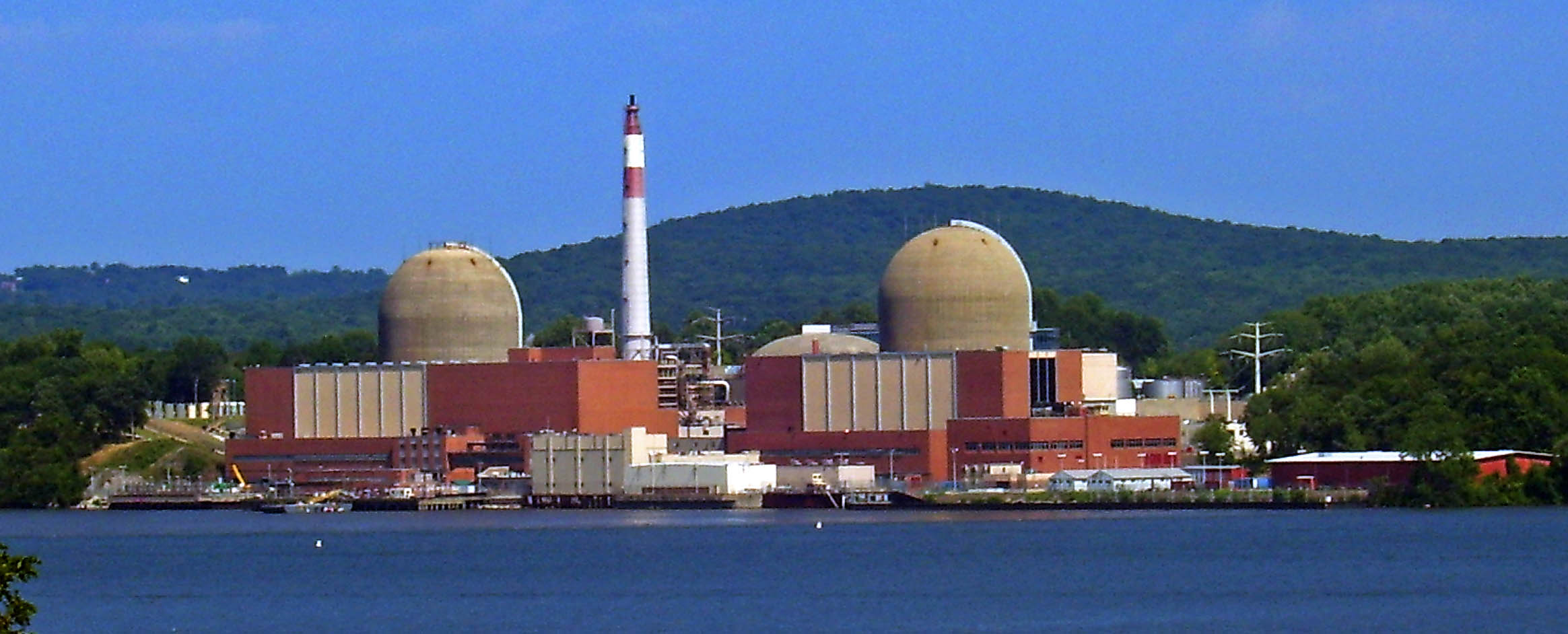
The Indian Point Energy Center in New York. Over a billion fish eggs and larvae were claimed to be killed in its cooling system each year while it was in operation.

Many power plants and other industries in the U.S. continue to use screens that impinge fish. For example, the cooling system at the Indian Point Energy Center in New York was claimed to kill over a billion fish eggs and larvae annually. At the Bay Shore Power Plant in Ohio, 46 million fish were killed over an 18-month period. Organisms that pass through the screens are killed or stressed (depending on the species) as they become entrained in the cooling system. 208 million fish eggs and over 2 billion small and larval fish were entrained at the Bay Shore plant over the same 18 months. EPA estimates that billions of fish and other organisms are killed each year in cooling water intakes. However, even more would be killed without the screens.

== Legal requirements ==
In the United States, the National Marine Fisheries Service, a division of NOAA, mandates positive-barrier fishscreens in most new diversions from waterways where endangered or threatened fish species occur. Some existing unscreened diversions whose construction pre-dates fish-screen mandates are grandfathered.

The U.S. Clean Water Act requires EPA to issue regulations on industrial cooling water intake structures. The agency issued regulations for new facilities in 2001 (amended 2003), and for existing facilities in 2014.

== See also ==
- Entergy Corp. v. Riverkeeper Inc. - US Supreme Court decision on cooling water intake regulations
- Fish ladder
- Fish weir
