= Union violence =

Violence committed during labor disputes

Union violence refers to violence committed by unions or union members to achieve political objectives, particularly during labor disputes. When union violence has occurred, it has frequently been in the context of industrial unrest. Violence has ranged from isolated acts by individuals to wider campaigns of organized violence aimed at furthering union goals within an industrial dispute.

Anti-union violence has also occurred frequently in the context of industrial unrest, and has often involved the collusion of management and government authorities, private agencies, or citizens' groups in organising violence against unions and their members.

== Overview ==
Protests and verbal abuse are routinely aimed against union members or replacement workers who cross picket lines ("blacklegs" or "scabs") during industrial disputes. The inherent aim of a union is to create a labor monopoly so as to balance the monopsony a large employer enjoys as a purchaser of labor. Strikebreakers threaten that goal and undermine the union's bargaining position, and occasionally this erupts into violent confrontation, with violence committed either by, or against, strikers. Some who have sought to explain such violence observe, if labor disputes are accompanied by violence, it may be because labor has no legal redress. In 1894, some workers declared:

..."the right of employers to manage their own business to suit themselves," is fast coming to mean in effect nothing less than a right to manage the country to suit themselves.

Occasionally, violent disputes occur between unions, when one union breaks another's strike.

== Research on union violence ==
Researchers in industrial relations, criminology, and wider cultural studies have examined violence by workers or trade unions in the context of industrial disputes. US and Australian government reports have examined violence during industrial disputes.

== By country ==
=== Australia ===
- 1996 - On 19 August 1996, Australian unionists physically broke into the Australian Parliament and fought Australian Federal Police during the 1996 Parliament House Riot.

=== Spain ===
- 1917-1923 - Pistolerismo

=== United Kingdom ===
- 1926 - In the context of the 1926 United Kingdom general strike, striking miners derailed The Flying Scotsman on May 10.
- 1972 - British Trade Union representative Ricky Tomlinson, now best known as an actor, was convicted for a two-year term for threatening construction workers.
- 1984 - Taxi driver David Wilkie was killed by striking miners while driving a non-striking worker during the NUM UK mining strike of 1984-85.

=== United States ===
- 1986 - During protests by the International Brotherhood of Electrical Workers Local 1547 against workers replacing union jobs, picketers engaged in scuffles, chanting and sounding gunshots. In 1999, the Alaska Supreme Court ruled that the union had engaged in "ongoing acts of intimidation, violence, destruction of property", awarding the plaintiff $212,500 in punitive damages.
- 1990 - on the first day of The New York Daily News strike, delivery trucks were attacked with stones and sticks, and in some cases burned, with the drivers beaten. Strikers then started threatening newsstands with arson, or stole all copies of the Daily News and burned them in front of the newsstands. James Hoge, publisher of the Daily News, alleged that there had been some 700 serious acts of violence. The New York Police Department claimed knowledge of 229 incidents of violence. Criminal charges under the Hobbs Act were declined, however, citing the aforementioned Enmons case.
- 1993 - Eddie York was killed by a rifle shot in the head while crossing a United Mine Workers (UMW) picket line at a coal mine in Logan County, West Virginia, on July 22, 1993. Like the 1990 NY Daily News strike, criminal charges under the Hobbs Act were declined, with the FBI and Justice Department citing the Enmons case.
- 1997 - On August 7, 1997, Teamsters Orestes Espinosa, Angel Mielgo, Werner Haechler, Benigno Rojas, and Adrian Paez beat, kicked, and stabbed a UPS worker (Rod Carter) who refused to strike, after Carter received a threatening phone call from the home of Anthony Cannestro Sr., president of Teamsters Local 769.

== See also ==
- Anti-union violence
- Labor spies
- Union busting
- Union organizer
- Union violence in the United States

People

- Norris J. Nelson, Los Angeles City Council member, commenting on union violence
- Joseph Yablonski
