= Julius Getman =

- Born: c. 1931 (age 94–95)

Academic background
- Education: City College of New York (BA); Harvard Law School (Bachelor of Laws, master of laws)

Academic work
- Discipline: United States labor law
- Sub-discipline: Labor history

Julius Gerson Getman (born 1931) is a professor of law at the University of Texas School of Law, and a noted labor and employment law scholar and labor historian.

== Education ==
Getman received his bachelor's degree from the City College of New York in 1953. He then attended Harvard Law School, where he received his Bachelor of Laws in 1958 and his master of laws in 1963. He began consulting for various labor and management groups thereafter, and became a noted arbitrator in labor disputes.

== Career ==
From 1959 to 1961, Getman was an attorney with the National Labor Relations Board in Washington, D.C.

He received an appointment as an associate professor of law at the Indiana University Bloomington school of law in 1963, becoming a full professor in 1967.

Getman was visiting professor of law at Banaras Hindu University in Varanasi and the Indian Law Institute in New Delhi from 1967 to 1968.

He returned to the United States and became a visiting professor of law at the University of Chicago Law School for the 1970–1971 term.

From 1976 to 1977, Getman was a professor of law at Stanford Law School. He won appointment at a professor of law at Yale Law School in 1978, where he remained until 1986. The same year, he became chief negotiator for the Connecticut State Police. During his tenure at Yale, Getman also became general counsel for the American Association of University Professors (AAUP), a position he held from 1980 to 1982.

In 1986, Getman was appointed Earl E. Sheffield Regents Professor of Law at the University of Texas School of Law. He spent the 1991–1992 term as Richard Huber Distinguished Visiting Professor of Law at Boston College.

== Research ==
Getman is a nationally renowned scholar of labor law. Getman conducts numerous field studies, and an empirical rather than theoretical perspective dominates his work. He co-wrote two books on federal labor law which remain fundamental texts in the field: Union Representation Elections: Law and Reality in 1976 and Labor Relations: The Basic Processes, Law and Practice in 1988.

Getman is also a well-known labor historian and activist. His 1998 book, The Betrayal of Local 14: Paperworkers, Politics and Permanent Replacements, tells the story of the 1987 strike at the International Paper paper mill in Androscoggin, Maine. Getman analyzes various factors which contributed to the strike's short-term success as well as its eventual collapse, arguing that federal labor law and internal union politics (especially those at international union headquarters as well as rivalries between the local union and its parent) were what led the strike to ultimately fail. With former United States Secretary of Labor Ray Marshall, he co-edited The Future of Labor Unions: Organized Labor in the 21st Century in 2004. The book analyzes how American, foreign and transnational labor policies might more effectively meet the needs of workers, companies and the public.

Getman has also published a book critical of higher education, In the Company of Scholars: The Struggle for the Soul of Higher Education. The book discusses the decline in the status of academicians, how politics and parochialism undermine scholasticism, and how faculty have been increasingly marginalized in the decision-making processes of American colleges and universities.

== Memberships and awards ==
Getman is a member of the American Association of University Professors, and served as the organization's president from 1986 to 1988.

He is also a member of the editorial committee and executive committee of the Labor Law Group, an association of labor and employment law professors.

Getman was admitted to the District of Columbia Bar in 1959 and to the Indiana Bar in 1970.

Getman's The Betrayal of Local 14: Paperworkers, Politics and Permanent Replacements won UT's Robert Hamilton Award for the best book by a University of Texas professor.

== Personal life ==
Getman's first novel, Strike!, was published in 2007. His oldest son Daniel has followed in his fathers footsteps by creating the Getman & Sweeney PLLC law firm which represents employees in overtime cases. His younger son Mike Getman, is the long-time head coach of the University of Alabama-Birmingham Blazers men's soccer team. His daughter Polya Getman is a dressage rider.

== Selected published works ==
=== Solely authored books ===
- The Betrayal of Local 14. New ed. Ithaca, N.Y.: ILR Press, 1999. ISBN 0-8014-8628-9
- In the Company of Scholars: The Struggle for the Soul of Higher Education. Austin, Tex.: University of Texas Press, 1992. ISBN 0-292-72755-0
- Strike! Austin, Tex.: Plain View Press, 2006. ISBN 1-891386-73-5

=== Co-authored books ===
- Getman, Julius and LeClercq, Terri. Taking on Big Pharma. Dr. Charles Bennett's Battle. New York: Skyhorse Publishing, 2023. ISBN 978-1-5107-7541-1

=== Co-edited books ===
- Getman, Julius G. and Anderson, Jerry R. Myths and Assumptions in Labor Law: The Role of Empirical Research. Washington, D.C.: Bureau of National Affairs, 1972. ISBN 0-87179-156-0
- Getman, Julius and Blackburn, John. Labor Relations: Law, Practice, and Policy. 2nd ed. Mineola, N.Y.: Foundation Press, 1983. ISBN 0-88277-102-7
- Getman, Julius G.; Goldberg, Stephen B.; and Herman, Jeanne B. Union Representation Elections: Law and Reality. New York: Russell Sage Foundation Press, 1976. ISBN 0-87154-302-8
- Getman, Julius and Marshall, F. Ray, eds. The Future of Labor Unions: Organized Labor in the 21st Century. Austin, Tex.: L.B.J. School of Public Affairs, 2004. ISBN 0-89940-119-8
- Getman, Julius and Pogrebin, Bertrand B. Labor Relations: The Basic Processes, Law and Practice. Westbury, N.Y.: Foundation Press, 1988. ISBN 0-88277-652-5
- Getman, Julius G.; Pogrebin, Bertand B.; and Gregory, David L. Labor Management Relations and the Law. 2nd ed. Westbury, N.Y.: Foundation Press, 1999. ISBN 1-56662-808-3

=== Solely authored articles ===
- "The Changing Role of Courts and the Potential Role of Unions In Overcoming Employment Discrimination." Tulane Law Review. 64:1477 (1990).
- "Contributions of Empirical Data to Legal Research." Journal of Legal Education. 35:489 (1985).
- "Explaining the Fall of the Labor Movement." St. Louis University Law Review. 41:575 (1997).
- "The Fine Line Between Success and Failure in Strikes and Organizing." University of Pennsylvania Journal of Labor and Employment Law. 2:719 (2000).
- "The Human Costs of Permanent Strike Replacement." St. Louis University Law Journal. 40:51 (1996).
- "The National Labor Relations Act: What Went Wrong; Can We Fix It?" Boston College Law Review. 45:125 (2003).
- "Ruminations on Union Organizing in the Private Sector." University of Chicago Law Review. 53:45 (1986).
- "Unions and the National Labor Relations Board." WorkingUSA. 8:501 (2005).

=== Co-authored articles ===
- Getman, Julius G. and Marshall, F. Ray. "The Continuing Assault on the Right to Strike." Texas Law Review. 79:703 (2001).
- Getman, Julius G. and Marshall, F. Ray. "Industrial Relations in Transition: The Paper Industry Example." Yale Law Journal. 102:1803 (1993).
