= Chisholm (surname) =

Chisholm (/ˈtʃɪzəm/ CHIZ-əm) is a Scottish surname. Although derived from a place near Hawick in southern Scotland, it later became established in the Highlands, where it was Gaelicised as Siosal.

Notable people with the surname or its variants include:

== Chisholm ==
=== In Australia ===
- Alan Rowland Chisholm (1888–1981), professor of French, critic and memorialist
- Alexander Hugh Chisholm (1890–1977), journalist, newspaper editor, author and ornithologist
- Alice Chisholm (1856–1954), Australian woman who provided canteen services for soldiers in Egypt and Palestine during World War I
- Anthony Chisholm (politician) (born 1978), Australian politician
- Caroline Chisholm (1808–1877) Renowned 19th century social worker in Australia
- Dane Chisholm (born 1990), Australian rugby league footballer
- Eric Chisholm (1892–1946), Australian rules footballer
- Geoff Chisholm (1929–2006), Australian politician
- Keith Chisholm (1918–1991), distinguished Australian fighter pilot
- Les Chisholm (1888–1923), Australian rules footballer
- Mark Chisholm (born 1981), Australian rugby union footballer
- Scott Chisholm (footballer) (born 1973), Aboriginal Australian Rules footballer
- Sheila Chisholm (1895–1969), socialite in British high society

=== In Canada ===
- Alexander Chisholm (Upper Canada politician) (1790–1854), political figure in Upper Canada
- Angus Chisholm (1908–1979), Cape Breton fiddler
- Arthur Murray Chisholm (1871–1960), Canadian author of Western fiction
- Bob Chisholm (born 1947), Canadian politician
- Brock Chisholm (1896–1971), physician
- Christopher P. Chisholm (1854–?), Canadian lawyer and political figure
- Daniel Black Chisholm (1832–1899), Canadian farmer, lawyer and politician
- Donald Chisholm (politician) (1822–1890), Canadian Member of Parliament
- George King Chisholm (1814–1874), politician
- Joseph Andrew Chisholm (1863–1950), politician and jurist
- Kenneth Chisholm (1829–1906), Canadian businessman and politician
- Marie-Hélène Chisholm (born 1979), judoka
- Robert Chisholm (Canadian politician) (born 1957), former politician
- Robert Kerr Chisholm (1819–1899), politician
- William Chisholm (Nova Scotia politician) (1870–1936), politician
- William Chisholm (Upper Canada politician) (1788–1842), founder of Oakville, Ontario

=== In the United Kingdom ===
- Aeneas Chisholm (vicar apostolic of the Highland District) (1759–1818), Roman Catholic bishop in Scotland
- Aeneas Chisholm (Bishop of Aberdeen) (1836–1918), Scottish prelate who served as the Roman Catholic Bishop of Aberdeen
- Alastair Chisholm (fl. 2023), Scottish children's writer
- Alex Chisholm (born 1968), British civil servant
- Alexander Chisholm (1792?–1847), British portrait and historical painter
- Alexander William Chisholm, 25th of Chisholm (1810–1838) Scottish landowner, clan chief and MP
- Caroline Chisholm (1808–1877), English humanitarian
- Catherine Chisholm (1878–1952), British physician
- Cecil Chisholm (1888–1961), British journalist, publisher and author
- David Chisholm (1937–1998), Scottish rugby union footballer
- Duncan Chisholm (born 1968), Scottish fiddle player and composer
- Erik Chisholm (1904–1965), Scottish composer and conductor
- Geoffrey Duncan Chisholm (1931–1994), British urologist
- George Chisholm (geographer) (1850–1930), author of first English-language economic geography textbook
- George Chisholm (musician) (1915–1997), jazz trombonist
- Gordon Chisholm (born 1960), Scottish footballer
- Grace Chisholm Young (1868–1944), mathematician (maiden name 'Chisholm')
- Hugh Chisholm (1866–1924), journalist and editor of the Encyclopædia Britannica
- Iain Chisholm (born 1985), Scottish footballer
- Janet Chisholm (1929–2004), MI6 agent
- John Chisholm (soldier), 16th-century Comptroller and Prefect of the Scottish artillery
- John Chisholm (vicar apostolic of the Highland District) (1752–1814), Roman Catholic bishop in Scotland
- John Chisholm (engineer) (born 1946), engineer, chairman of the Medical Research Council and QinetiQ
- John Stephen Roy Chisholm (1926–2015), English mathematical physicist
- Ken Chisholm (1925–1990), Scottish footballer
- Malcolm Chisholm (born 1949), Scottish politician
- Mairi Chisholm (1896–1981), Scottish nurse and ambulance driver in the First World War
- Melanie Chisholm (better known as Melanie C), British singer
- Michael Chisholm (geographer) (1931–2024), British human geographer
- Robert Chisholm (architect) (1838–1915), architect of the Indo-Saracenic Senate House of the University of Madras
- William Chisholm (died 1564), bishop of Dunblane
- William Chisholm (died 1593), bishop of Dunblane and of Vaison, nephew to the above

=== In the United States ===
- Anthony Chisholm (actor), (1943–2020), American actor
- Henry Chisholm (1822–1881), Scottish American businessman
- Hugh J. Chisholm (1847–1912), industrialist
- Jesse Chisholm (died 1868), American Indian trader, guide, and interpreter for whom the Chisholm Trail is named
- John Chisholm (born 1963), American prosecutor
- Jori Chisholm (born 1975), bagpiper
- Kari Chisholm (born 1973), United States politician
- Linda Chisholm (born 1957), United States volleyball player
- Malcolm H. Chisholm (1945–2015), chemist
- Roderick Chisholm (1916–1999), philosopher
- Sallie W. Chisholm (born 1947), scientist who discovered the cyanobacterium Prochlorococcus
- Shirley Chisholm (1924–2005), politician
- Thomas Chisholm (songwriter), American songwriter who wrote several prominent Christian hymns including "Great Is Thy Faithfulness"
- Tim Chisholm (born 1969), player of real tennis
- Tanya Chisholm (born 1984), American actress
- Walter Scott Chisholm (1836–1890), American attorney
- William Chisholm (died 1877), victim of the Chisolm Massacre

=== Elsewhere ===
- Jamel Chisholm (born 1995), Jamaican international rugby league footballer playing in England
- Jazz Chisholm Jr. (born 1998), Bahamian baseball player
- Lael Chisholm, New Zealand children's picture book illustrator

== Chisholme ==
- John James Scott-Chisholme (1851–1899), British cavalry officer who died in the Second Anglo-Boer War

== Chisolm ==
- Garrett Chisolm, American NFL player
- Richard Chisolm, cinematographer and film-maker based in Baltimore, Maryland

== Chisum ==
- David Chisum (born 1970), American actor
- Donald S. Chisum, American legal scholar
- Gloria Chisum (born 1930), American psychologist
- John Chisum (1824–1884), American cattle baron, depicted in the 1970 Western film Chisum
- John Chisum (baseball) (1915–1982), American baseball player

== See also ==
- Chisholm (disambiguation)
- Aeneas Chisholm (disambiguation)
- Alexander Chisholm (disambiguation)
- Anthony Chisholm (disambiguation)
- Colin Chisholm (disambiguation)
- George Chisholm (disambiguation)
- John Chisholm (disambiguation)
- Margaret Chisholm (disambiguation)
