= Chisholm =

Chisholm, Chisholme or Chisolm may refer to:

== Places ==
=== Australia ===
- Chisholm, Australian Capital Territory, Canberra
- Chisholm, New South Wales, a suburb of Maitland, New South Wales
- Division of Chisholm, an electoral district in the Australian House of Representatives in Victoria

=== Canada ===
- Chisholm, Alberta
- Chisholm, Ontario

=== United States ===
- Chisholm, Maine
- Chisholm, Minnesota
- Chisholm, Texas
- Chisholm Creek (Kansas), a stream in Kansas
- Chisholm Spring, Oklahoma
- Chisholm Trail, Texas

=== Saudi Arabia ===
- Chisholm Point (27°56'45.5"N 34°30'10.2"E), a cape of Tiran Island

== Schools ==
- Caroline Chisholm School – Senior Campus, formerly Caroline Chisholm High School, in Australia
- Chisholm Institute, a Technical and Further Education (TAFE) Institute located throughout Victoria, Australia

== People ==
- Chisholm (surname), includes Chisholme, Chisolm and Chisum
- Clan Chisholm, a Scottish clan

== Other uses ==
- Chisholm v. Georgia, a 1793 case heard by the United States Supreme Court
- SS Clan Chisholm (1937), a British cargo ship
- Chisolm Massacre, 1877 killings in Mississippi

== See also ==
- Chisom, a given name
