= 1987–1988 International Paper strike =

Labor dispute in the United States

The International Paper strike was a strike begun in 1987 by paper mill workers affiliated with the United Paperworkers' International Union (UPIU) at a number of plants in the United States owned by the International Paper (IP) company. The strike extended into 1988 and the company hired permanent replacements for workers. The plant in Maine, known as the Androscoggin Mill, attracted national attention during this period. Ultimately, the strike ended with strikers defeated in their demands and permanently replaced with non-unionized workers. In 2006, International Paper sold this plant to Verso Holdings, LLC. In March 2023, the mill permanently closed.

== History ==
Collective bargaining negotiations between the union and employer had been stable and uneventful for years. When contract talks with the various locals of the United Paperworkers' International Union (UPIU, now part of the United Steelworkers) opened, it became clear that International Paper's attitude had changed. Although the company had recently recorded near-record profits, it demanded wage givebacks, high monthly payments for health and other insurance, an end to double-time pay for work on Sundays, and the elimination of all holidays (including Christmas). The company locked out the strikers.

When paper workers at IP's Androscoggin mill in Jay, Maine began their talks with IP, the Maine AFL–CIO assigned staff organizer Peter Kellman to work with the local. UPIU Local 14, had no history of member activism and little organizational infrastructure. The local community provided little support to the paperworkers' union so long as IP provided well-paying jobs. Residents were unwilling to take action (such as demand an end to mill pollution of the local waterways) that would anger the company. But within a month of the start of the strike in June 1987, Kellman had radicalized and energized the factory workers and was building a successful "class-based social movement." The strike by IP's 1,200 workers in Jay generated international attention and provoked introduction of a bill in Congress to ban striker replacement.

International Paper immediately fired every union worker who had struck, and hired permanent replacements.

Although the strike lingered until October 1988, Kellman and the union were fighting a losing battle. Kellman convinced the local union leadership to seek assistance from their parent union and the AFL–CIO. Initially, UPIU leaders agreed to begin a comprehensive campaign against International Paper. But UPIU was unprepared to engage in such a battle. Neither the local nor the international union had had enough lead-time to conduct research, the unions did not have economic or shareholder leverage against IP, and state and local community leaders were ambivalent about supporting the union. The strikers had little bargaining power once they had been replaced. Many in the labor movement later argued that UPIU and the AFL–CIO had "sold out" Local 14. In time, some came to moderate this position, arguing that a comprehensive campaign strategy could have been successful, but that all organizations involved lacked the organizational expertise and infrastructure as well as the political will to successfully implement the tactic.

The second and third union workers to take their jobs back as "super scabs" suffered their houses being shot up in drive-by attacks. Local police dismissed the actions as an inside-out shooting after removing the spent bullets from within the victims' houses.

In August 2006, International Paper sold the Androscoggin plant to Verso Holdings, LLC. The Androscoggin plant remained non-union until its closure in March 2023.

== Sources ==
- Dannin, Ellen J. "Divided We Fall: The Story of the Paperworkers' Union and the Future of Labor (review)." Labor Studies Journal, Spring 2006.
- Early, Steve. "Solidarity Sometimes". The American Prospect. September 11, 2000.
- Getman, Julius. The Betrayal of Local 14. New ed. Ithaca, N.Y.: ILR Press, 1999. ISBN 0-8014-8628-9
- Kellman, Peter. Divided We Fall: The Story of the Paperworkers' Union and the Future of Labor. Croton-on-Hudson, N.Y.: Apex Press, 2004. ISBN 1-891843-23-0
- Kellman, Peter, ed. Pain on Their Faces: Testimonies on the Paper Mill Strike, Jay, Maine, 1987-1988. Croton-on-Hudson, N.Y.: Apex Press, 1998. ISBN 0-945257-96-1
- Minchin, Timothy J. "'Labor's Empty Gun': Permanent Replacements and the International Paper Company Strike of 1987–88". Labor History. February 2006.
