= Hinterland =

Area under influence of a human settlement

Hinterland is the area under the influence of a particular human settlement. The word comes from a German word meaning 'land behind' a city, a port, or similar. Its use in English was first documented by the geographer George Chisholm in his Handbook of Commercial Geography (1888). Originally the term was associated with the area of a port in which materials for export and import are stored and shipped. Subsequently, the use of the word expanded to its current use.

== History ==
The word hinterland was recorded in English by Scottish geographer George Chisholm in 1888, to describe the region behind a port that was economically connected to it for imports and exports. The term was later adopted during the era of European colonialism, particularly during the Scramble for Africa to refer to inland areas that coastal powers claimed as their own.

== Geographic region ==
- An area behind a coast or the shoreline of a river. Specifically, by the doctrine of the hinterland, the hinterland is the inland region lying behind a port and is claimed by the state that owns the coast.
- In shipping usage, a port's hinterland is the area that it serves, both for imports and for exports.
- The term is also used to refer to the area around a city or town.
- More generally, hinterland can refer to the rural area economically tied to an urban catchment area. The size of a hinterland can depend on geography, or on the ease, speed, and cost of transportation between the catchment area and the hinterland.
- In colonial usage, the term was applied to the surrounding areas of former European colonies in Africa, which, although not part of the colony itself, were influenced by the colony. By analogous general economic usage, hinterland can refer to the area surrounding a service from which customers are attracted, also called the market area.
- In German, Hinterland is sometimes used more generally to describe any sparsely populated area where the infrastructure is underdeveloped, although Provinz (analogous to province) is more common. In the United States, and particularly in the American Midwest (a region of German cultural heritage located far from ocean ports), it is this meaning and not the one relating to ports that predominates in common use. Analogous terms include "the countryside", "the sticks", "the boonies", backcountry, boondocks, the Bush (in Alaskan usage), the outback (Australia), and the sertão (Brazil).
- In Germany a local area in the western part of the Kurfürstentum Hessen (Electorate of Hesse) is named Hessisches Hinterland (short: Hinterland, Hessian Hinterland) without being the local backcountry to a larger city. Cities there are Battenberg, Biedenkopf and Gladenbach. The name Hinterland was in use over many centuries, and nowadays means a smaller area. Lesser known, similar names are given to other areas in Germany (and Switzerland).
- In Italy, hinterland is used to describe the metropolitan area of a city, especially Milan, outside of the main municipality.

== Breadth of knowledge ==
A further sense in which the term is commonly applied, especially regarding British politicians, is in talking about an individual's depth and breadth of knowledge (or lack thereof), of matters outside politics, specifically of academic, artistic, cultural, literary and scientific pursuits. For instance, one could say, "X has a vast hinterland", or "Y has no hinterland". The spread of this usage is usually credited to Denis Healey (British Defence Secretary 1964–1970, Chancellor of the Exchequer 1974–1979) and his wife Edna Healey, initially in the context of the lack of hinterland—i.e., interests outside of politics—of former Prime Minister Margaret Thatcher.

== See also ==
- Dalmatian Hinterland
