= Alexander Chisholm =

Alexander Chisholm may refer to:

- Alexander Chisholm (Upper Canada politician) (1790–1854), political figure in Upper Canada
- Alexander Chisholm (artist) (1792–1847), Scottish artist
- Alexander Chisholm, a citizen of South Carolina in the 1790s in Chisholm v. Georgia
- Alexander Hugh Chisholm (1890–1977), Australian journalist, newspaper editor, author and amateur ornithologist
- Alexander William Chisholm (Canadian politician) (1869–1939), physician and political figure in Nova Scotia, Canada
- Alexander Chisholm (priest) (1887–1975), Archdeacon of Carlisle
- Alexander Chisholm (MP), British Member of Parliament for Inverness-shire
- Lex Chisholm (1915–1981), Canadian ice hockey centre in the NHL
