= Jay, Maine =

Town in Maine, United States

- Town
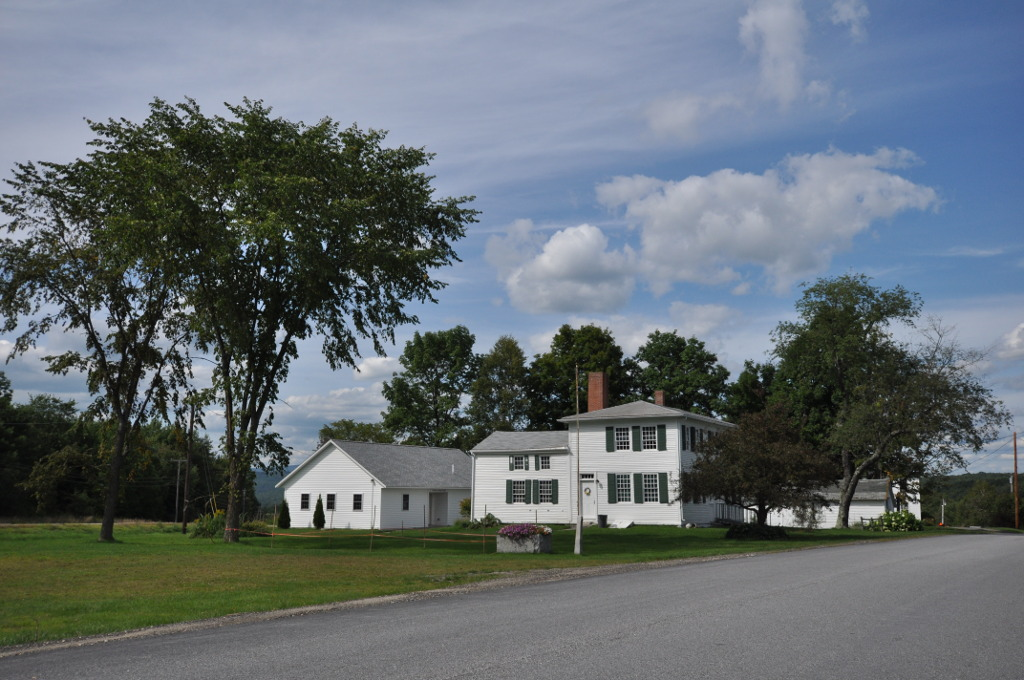
- Holmes-Crafts Homestead is now a museum maintained by the Jay Historical Society

- Seal
- Motto: "Proud of our past...Working for our future"
- Location within Maine Location within the United States
- Coordinates: 44°31′24″N 70°12′58″W
- Country: United States
- State: Maine
- County: Franklin
- Incorporated: 1795
- Villages: Jay; Chisholm; North Jay; Riley

Area
  - Total: 49.20 sq mi (127.43 km^{2})
  - Land: 48.38 sq mi (125.30 km^{2})
  - Water: 0.82 sq mi (2.12 km^{2})
- Elevation: 614 ft (187 m)

Population (2020)
  - Total: 4,620
  - Density: 96/sq mi (36.9/km^{2})
- Time zone: UTC−5 (Eastern (EST))
  - Summer (DST): UTC−4 (EDT)
- ZIP Codes: 04239 (Jay); 04262 (North Jay)
- Area code: 207
- FIPS code: 23-35625
- GNIS feature ID: 582534
- Website: www.jay-maine.org

Jay is a town in Franklin County, Maine, United States. Jay was included in the Lewiston-Auburn, Maine metropolitan New England city and town area. The population was 4,620 at the 2020 United States census. Jay includes the village of Chisholm.

== History ==
This was once territory of the Anasagunticook (or Androscoggin) Abenaki Indians, whose main village was Rockameko, located on Canton Point. They were decimated by smallpox in 1757. The township was then granted by the Massachusetts General Court to Captain Joseph Phipps and 63 others for their services in the French and Indian War. Called Phipps-Canada, the plantation was not settled until after the Revolutionary War. On February 26, 1795, Phipps-Canada was incorporated as Jay for John Jay, the first chief justice of the Supreme Court.

Originally in Cumberland County, Jay became part of the formation of Oxford County on March 4, 1805 (affirmed part of Oxford County in 1808), then of Franklin County on May 9, 1838. In 1821, Canton was set off from Jay and incorporated as a town.

Farmers found the soil to be loamy and productive, yielding great quantities of hay, corn, wheat, potatoes, oats and apples. In 1793, a tavern was constructed at Jay Hill. On the Androscoggin River near Jay Hill was erected a toll bridge, then in 1839 a sawmill. At North Jay was built a sawmill, brickyard and granite quarry. White granite from the North Jay Granite Company, established in 1884, would be used to construct numerous important buildings throughout the country, including Grant's Tomb. East Jay had a sawmill, and Bean's Corner a carriage factory. In 1857, the Maine Central Railroad reached town.

Jay had a population of 1,490 in 1870. The following years would see papermaking develop into the town's predominant industry. In 1888, industrialist Hugh J. Chisholm built at southern Jay the Otis Falls Pulp & Paper Company mill, then the third largest paper mill in the country. Nearby developed the mill town village of Chisholm. In 1898, it became one of the founding mills of International Paper. In 1905, International Paper built a mill on the opposite side of the river, which became known as the Otis mill. The mill was known as James River through the 1980s. In 1998, this mill was sold to Wausau Paper from a group of investors. In 1965, International Paper opened the Androscoggin Mill. It is an integrated pulp and finished paper goods plant, employing 990 people operating five paper machines. In 1987-88, it was site of a major strike by members of the United Paperworkers' International Union against International Paper, which ultimately led to management hiring strikebreakers to permanently replace the strikers. In March 2009, Wausau Paper announced the closing of the Otis mill. Operations there stopped permanently at the end of May 2009.

In 2020, an explosion occurred at the Androscoggin Mill.

== Natural resources ==
In addition to the abundance of trees common to Maine towns, Jay has a large deposit of granite, most notably white granite, and Jay granite has been used in buildings and projects across the nation.

== Geography ==
According to the United States Census Bureau, the town has a total area of 49.20 square miles (127.43 km^{2}), of which 48.38 square miles (125.30 km^{2}) is land and 0.82 square miles (2.12 km^{2}) is water. Jay is drained by Seven Mile Stream and the Androscoggin River.

The town is crossed by state routes 4, 17, 133, 140 and 156. It is bounded by the towns of Wilton to the north, Chesterville to the east, Livermore and Livermore Falls to the south, and Canton and Dixfield to the west.

== Demographics ==
Historical population
Census	Pop.	Note	%±
1800	430		—
1810	1,107		157.4%
1820	1,614		45.8%
1830	1,276		−20.9%
1840	1,750		37.1%
1850	1,733		−1.0%
1860	1,680		−3.1%
1870	1,490		−11.3%
1880	1,291		−13.4%
1890	1,541		19.4%
1900	2,758		79.0%
1910	2,987		8.3%
1920	3,152		5.5%
1930	3,106		−1.5%
1940	2,858		−8.0%
1950	3,102		8.5%
1960	3,247		4.7%
1970	3,954		21.8%
1980	5,080		28.5%
1990	5,080		0.0%
2000	4,985		−1.9%
2010	4,851		−2.7%
2020	4,620		−4.8%
U.S. Decennial Census

=== 2010 census ===
As of the census of 2010, there were 4,851 people, 2,032 households, and 1,394 families residing in the town. The population density was 100.3 inhabitants per square mile (38.7/km^{2}). There were 2,252 housing units at an average density of 46.5 per square mile (18.0/km^{2}). The racial makeup of the town was 98.1% White, 0.2% African American, 0.4% Native American, 0.3% Asian, 0.1% from other races, and 0.9% from two or more races. Hispanic or Latino of any race were 1.4% of the population.

There were 2,032 households, of which 29.6% had children under the age of 18 living with them, 51.9% were married couples living together, 11.6% had a female householder with no husband present, 5.2% had a male householder with no wife present, and 31.4% were non-families. Of all households, 25.2% were made up of individuals, and 10.8% had someone living alone who was 65 years of age or older. The average household size was 2.39 and the average family size was 2.78.

The median age in the town was 43.3 years. 22.1% of residents were under the age of 18; 7.6% were between the ages of 18 and 24; 23.1% were from 25 to 44; 30% were from 45 to 64; and 17.4% were 65 years of age or older. The gender makeup of the town was 49.1% male and 50.9% female.

=== 2000 census ===
As of the census of 2000, there were 4,985 people, 2,019 households, and 1,449 families residing in the town. The population density was 102.9 inhabitants per square mile (39.7/km^{2}). There were 2,155 housing units at an average density of 44.5 per square mile (17.2/km^{2}). The racial makeup of the town was 97.91% White, 0.26% African American, 0.46% Native American, 0.22% Asian, 0.06% Pacific Islander, 0.10% from other races, and 0.98% from two or more races. Hispanic or Latino of any race were 0.48% of the population.

There were 2,019 households, out of which 32.7% had children under the age of 18 living with them, 55.9% were married couples living together, 11.4% had a female householder with no husband present, and 28.2% were non-families. Of all households, 22.9% were made up of individuals, and 10.4% had someone living alone who was 65 years of age or older. The average household size was 2.47 and the average family size was 2.87.

In the town, the population was spread out, with 26.2% under the age of 18, 6.0% from 18 to 24, 28.2% from 25 to 44, 25.3% from 45 to 64, and 14.3% who were 65 years of age or older. The median age was 39 years. For every 100 females, there were 95.0 males. For every 100 females age 18 and over, there were 91.5 males.

The median income for a household in the town was $36,746, and the median income for a family was $43,365. Males had a median income of $35,405 versus $20,897 for females. The per capita income for the town was $17,123. About 8.7% of families and 10.4% of the population were below the poverty line, including 12.8% of those under age 18 and 7.9% of those age 65 or over.

== Sites of interest ==
- Holmes-Crafts Homestead

== Government ==
The Town of Jay is governed by a five-member board of selectmen. Selectmen serve three year terms and are not limited in the number of terms they can serve. Selectmens' meetings are held every other Monday in the Selectmens' Room at the town office. The current selectmen are:

1. Judy Diaz
2. Tom Goding
3. Timothy DeMillo
4. Gary McGrane
5. Terry Bergeron

Town Manager: Shiloh Lafreniere

In addition, Jay has a planning board, a board of appeals, a board of assessment review, a recreation committee, and a budget committee (as of 2016).

== Education ==
The Jay School Department was owned by The Town of Jay and was governed by a five-member school committee and one superintendent. The district consisted of one elementary, middle and high school. In 2010 the estimated the districtwide student population was approximately 700 students. Jay School Department was recognized as the third smallest school district (with the exception of unorganized territory school districts) in the State of Maine. Because of the size of the school district and excellent ratings the school districts received extra federal funding for being one of America's Top Performing School Districts with a population of under 1,000.

During the 2010–2011 school year Jay Elementary School held about 220 students serving grade Pre-K through 3rd. The school was built in the mid-1960s and a small addition was added. The elementary school was redone in the summer of 2018

Jay Middle School in the 2010–2011 school year had an estimated population of about 250 students in grades 4–8. The middle school, finished in 1997, consists of two floors, and is the newest school in the district. The school connects onto the Jay Community Building, where the townspeople vote and special meetings are held. The top floor of community building is where the large gymnasium is located. The Jay School Committee often meets in the middle school cafeteria or library because of the large space.

Jay High School had an estimated population of about 250 during the 2010–2011 school year in grades 9–12. The Jay High School building opened in the fall of 1970 and since then has held high school classes for students in Jay since. The building offers a unique architecture as it has a large domed gym, formerly known as The Tiger Dome; the tigers being the school and district mascot. The large gymnasium makes up about a quarter of the whole building's square footage and classes are held in wing off the center of the building.

In 2010 Jay Schools consolidated with RSU 36 encompassing Livermore and Livermore Falls to form RSU 73. Jay High School and Livermore Falls High School were renamed Spruce Mountain High School North and South campuses respectively. The Tigers and Andies mascots were replaced by the Spruce Mountain Phoenix, to signify the rebirth of the schools. Livermore Falls Middle School was closed in the summer of 2011 and the students and faculty were incorporated into the new Spruce Mountain Middle School located at the former Jay Middle School building. Plans to unite the two high schools under one roof were laid with a number of options available, a) Extend the current North Campus facility to accommodate the students and staff from the South Campus, b) Install portable buildings to increase the space at North Campus to facilitate the union of the high schools, c) relocate the Spruce Mountain Middle School to the South Campus and move the South Campus High School to the North Campus. The vote to allow the raising of a bond to enable the building of the planned extension failed in early 2012 and the other options were examined. The School District budget has failed on two successive votes in all three towns following the failed bond vote.

Eventually the south campus was abandoned and all students were moved to the north campus. Many classrooms were divided in half to accommodate the greater number of students. In June 2016, the first class of Spruce Mountain High School to be fully consolidated throughout high school graduated.

== Notable people ==
- Franklin W. Johnson, president of Colby College (1929–1942)
- Edwin Thompson, head coach of the Georgetown baseball team

== Gallery ==
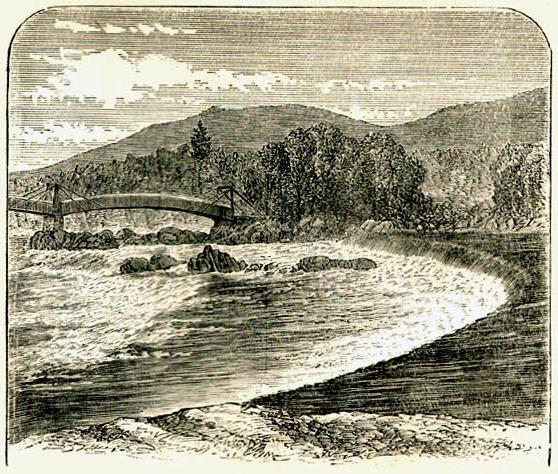
Jay Bridge Falls in 1869

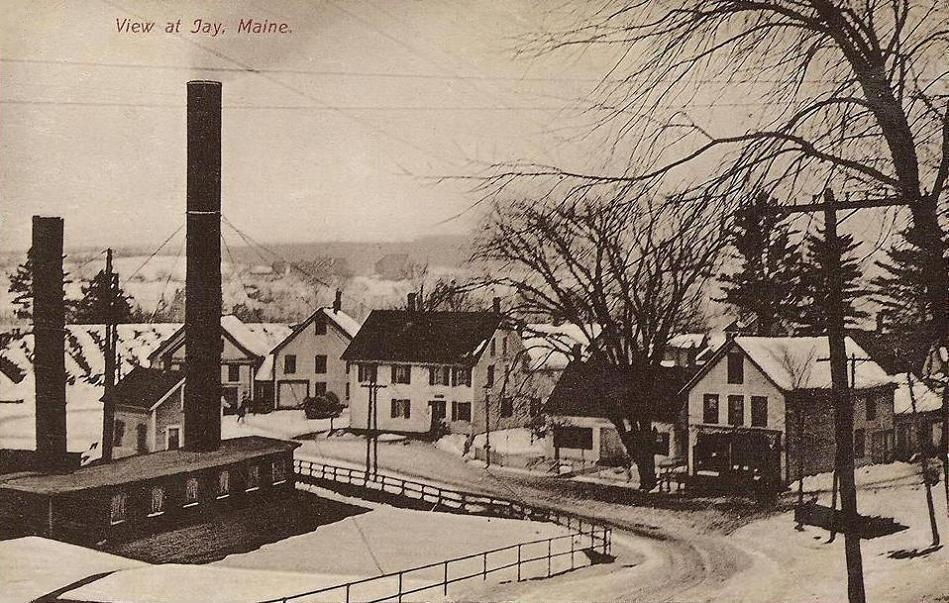
View of Jay in 1910

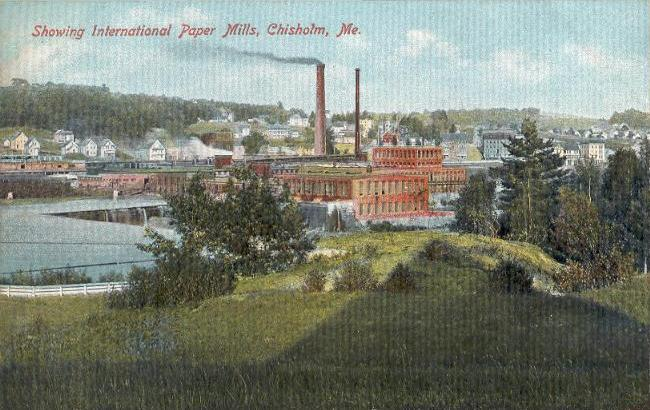
Paper mills c. 1908
