= Holmes-Crafts Homestead =

Historic house in Maine, United States

- U.S. National Register of Historic Places
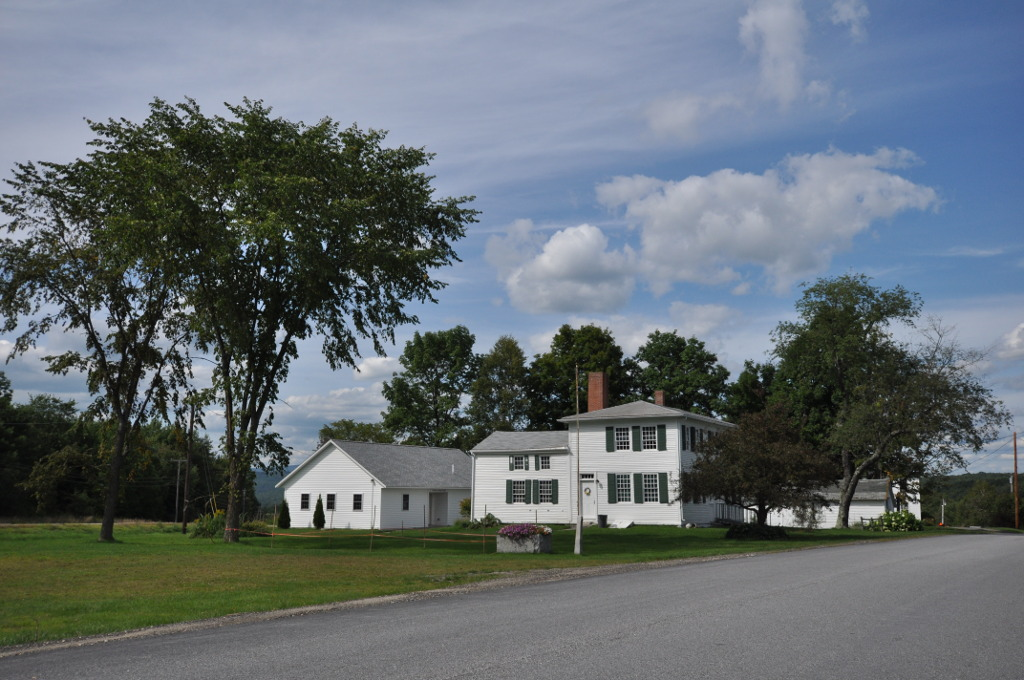

- Location within Maine Location within the United States
- Location: Old N. Jay Rd. on ME 4, North Jay, Maine
- Coordinates: 44°31′8″N 70°13′28″W
- Area: 5 acres (2.0 ha)
- Built: 1820
- Architectural style: Federal
- NRHP reference No.: 73000105
- Added to NRHP: April 26, 1973

The Holmes-Crafts Homestead is a historic house at the southern junction of Old Jay Hill Road and Main Street (Maine State Route 4) in Jay, Maine. Built in the early 19th century, it is a well-preserved local example of Federal architecture, and was home to James Starr, one of the first settlers of the area and a prominent local lawyer and politician. The building, now owned by the local historical society, was listed on the National Register of Historic Places in 1973.

== Description and history ==
The Holmes-Crafts Homestead is a two-story wood-frame structure, five bays wide, with a hip roof and two chimneys placed near the rear. A gable-roofed ell extends to the rear of the main block. The house has retained a large amount of is exterior finish, including original clapboards and windows. The main entrance has a Federal style surround with sidelight windows and a carved panel above. The interior has equally well-preserved wide pine floors and original door and window hardware.

The house is known to have been standing in 1820, when it was purchased by James Starr, a lawyer and surveyor who was one of the first white settlers to arrive in the Jay Hill area in 1802. Starr also operated a tavern nearby, served as the town's first postmaster, and represented it in the state legislature. The property was purchased in 1833 by Aruna Holmes, Starr's son-in-law, who was a cabinetmaker. He had a shop which extended from the house's ell, but is no longer standing. The house is now owned by the Jay Historical Society, and is open by appointment.

== See also ==
- National Register of Historic Places listings in Franklin County, Maine
