= James Monroe Wells =

American politician, soldier and author

James Monroe Wells (1837–1918) was an author, Union Army officer, and politician. He wrote The Chisolm Massacre; A picture of "home rule" in Mississippi about the Chisolm Massacre. James Daniel Lynch responded with an account blaming Radical Republicans titled Kemper County Vindicated, And a Peep at Radical Rule in Mississippi. Wells served as a state senator in Idaho.

Lucinda D. Wells and Samuel Percival Wells were his parents. Wells was born in Erie County, New York and moved to Michigan with his family at age two. He grew up on a farm. He studied at Kalamazoo College, and became a teacher. He served in the Union Army as a cavalry officer. He was twice captured. He and others escaped through a tunnel from Libby Prison. He married Delphene Bartholomew in 1866.

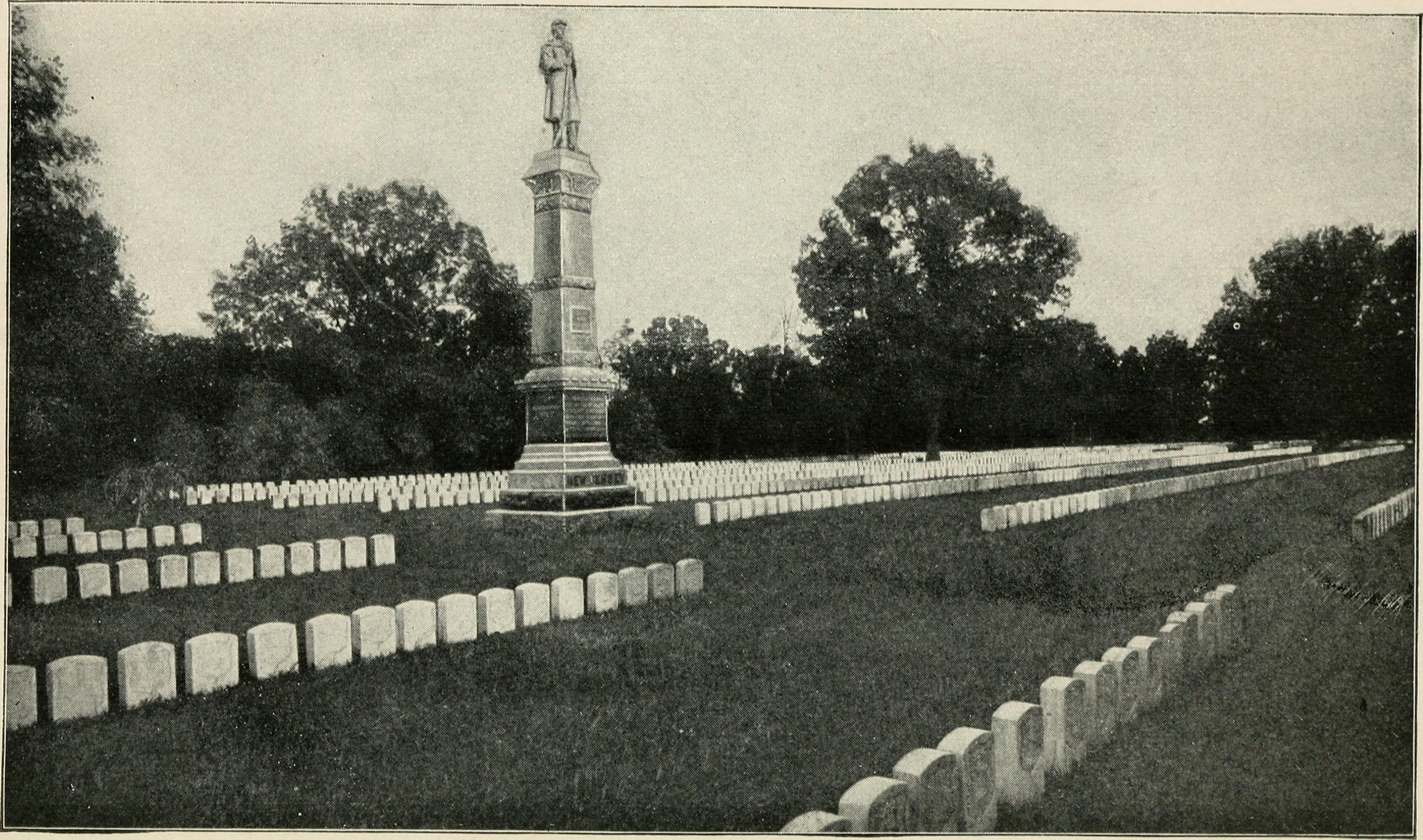
View of Andersonville National Cemetery from his autobiography With Touch of Elbow

He came to Mississippi in 1868 for a Federal revenue position and was a Republican leader in Kemper County, Mississippi. He moved to Idaho in 1884 and served as a state senator in its first legislature. His autobiography titled With Touch of Elbow was published in 1909.

== Writings ==
- The Chisholm massacre : a picture of "home rule" in Mississippi.
- Tunneling out of Libby Prison : a Michigan lieutenant's account of his own imprisonment and daring escape
- With touch of elbow or, death before dishonor : a thrilling narrative of adventure on land and sea by James M Wells; United States. Army. Michigan Cavalry Regiment, 8th (1862–1865)
