= James Daniel Lynch =

American lawyer, farmer, judge, poet, and writer

Judge

Personal details
- Born: January 6, 1836 Mecklenburg County, Virginia
- Died: July 19, 1903 (aged 67) Mississippi
- Occupation: Lawyer, farmer, judge, poet, writer

James Daniel Lynch (January 6, 1836 – July 19, 1903) was an American lawyer, farmer, judge, poet, and writer. His poem "Columbia Saluting the Nations" was chosen as the official salutation for the Chicago World's Fair in 1893. He lived in Mississippi. He served in the Confederate Army. He was an opponent of Reconstruction.

He was born in Mecklenburg County, Virginia, and studied at the University of North Carolina. He moved to Columbus, Mississippi in 1860 and taught at Franklin Academy.

His legal career became a struggle due to hearing impairment and he turned to writing. His book Kemper County Vindicated, And a Peep at Radical Rule in Mississippi was a response to criticisms of home rule by Radical Republican James Monroe Wells over the Chisolm Massacre in The Chisolm Massacre: A Picture of "Home Rule" in Mississippi (1877).

== Bibliography ==
- "Robert E. Lee, or, Heroes of the South" A poem, G.W. Reed, printer, West Point, Mississippi (1876)
- "Redpath; or, The Ku-Klux tribunal. : A poem. " Excelsior Book and Job Printing Establishment, Columbus, Mississippi (1877)
- Kemper County Vindicated, And a Peep at Radical Rule in Mississippi, E. J. Hale & Son, New York (1879)
- The Bench and Bar of Mississippi (1881)
- The Bench and Bar of Texas (1885)
- "Columbia Saluting the Nations"
