= International Paper =

American pulp and paper company

International Paper Company

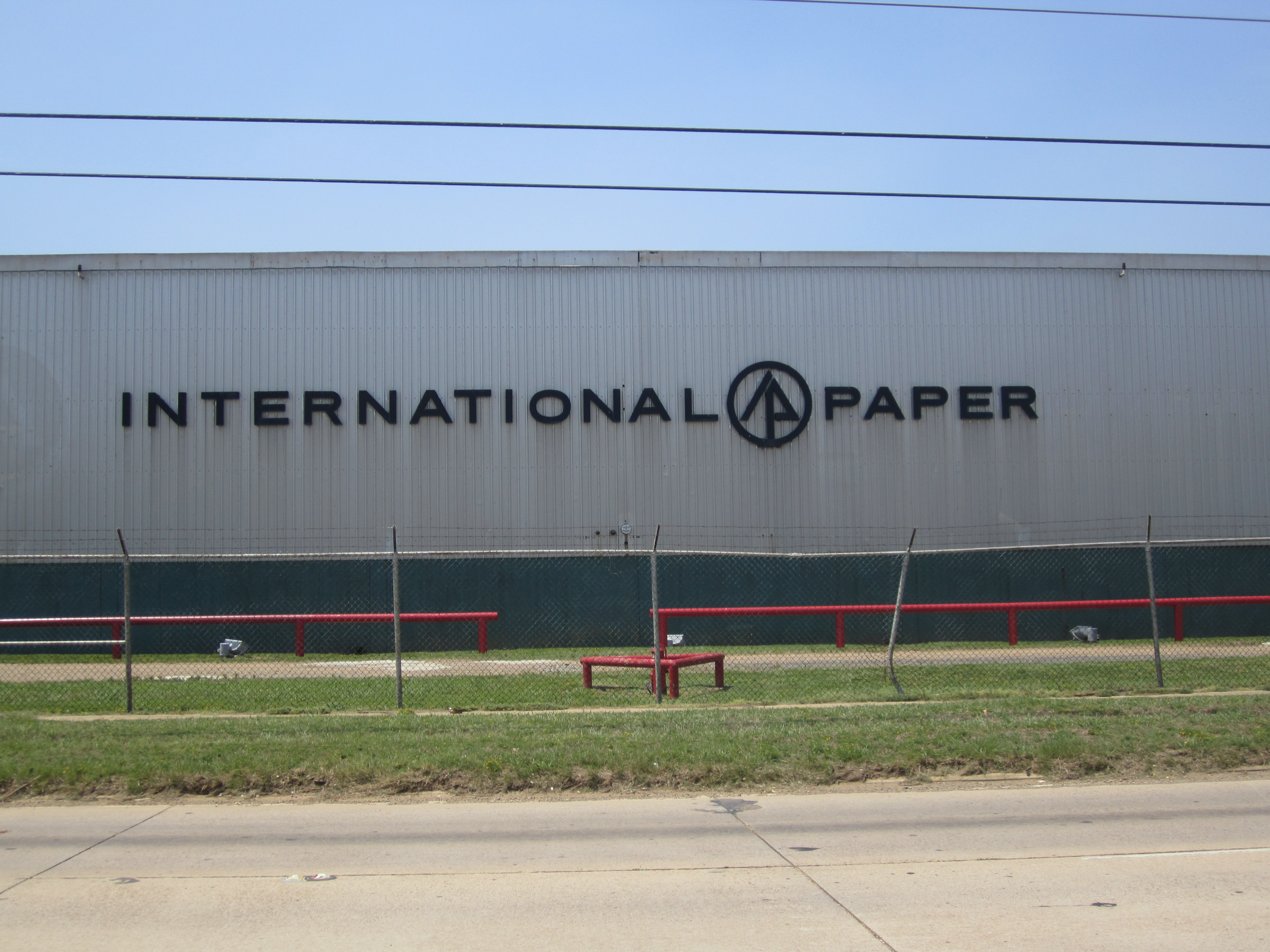
- Type: Public
- Traded as: NYSE: IP; S&P 500 component; DJIA component (until 2004)
- Industry: Pulp and paper
- Founded: 1898; 128 years ago in Corinth, New York, United States
- Founders: Hugh J. Chisholm; William A. Russell
- Headquarters: Memphis, Tennessee, United States
- Area served: Worldwide
- Key people: Andrew Silvernail (CEO)
- Revenue: ▼US$18.6 billion (2024)
- Operating income: ▼US$255 million (2024)
- Net income: ▲US$557 million (2024)
- Total assets: ▼US$22.8 billion (2024)
- Total equity: ▼US$8.17 billion (2024)
- Number of employees: 37,000 (2024)
- Subsidiaries: Temple-Inland, CMCP, Cartón y Papel Reciclado S.A., Cartonajes Union S.L., ZAO, Weldwood of Canada, Castell, L.P., Sustainable Forests, Bolsaflex
- Website: internationalpaper.com

The International Paper Company is an American pulp and paper company, the largest such company in the world. It has approximately 39,000 employees, and is headquartered in Memphis, Tennessee.

== History ==
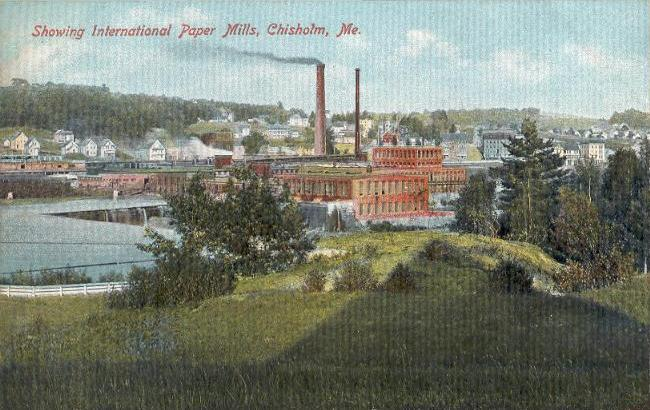
One of the 17 original founding mills of International Paper c. 1908, built in 1888 as the Otis Falls Pulp & Paper Company in Chisholm, Maine

The company was incorporated January 31, 1898, upon the merger of 17 pulp and paper mills in the northeastern United States and eastern Canada. Its founders and first two presidents were William Augustus Russell, who died suddenly in January 1899, and Hugh J. Chisholm. Philip Tell Dodge, president of the Mergenthaler Linotype Company, served as its chairman for 11 years. The invention of the Linotype dramatically increased the size of newspapers and the need for newsprint. The newly formed company supplied 60 percent of all newsprint in the country.

=== Hudson River Mill ===
The Hudson River Mill in Corinth, New York, where the Sacandaga River joins the Hudson River, was a pioneer in the development of the modern paper industry in the late 19th century. The first wood-based newsprint paper mill in New York, it was built by Albrecht Pagenstecher in 1869.

In the early 20th century, the Hudson River Mill was one of the company's largest plants and served both as its principal office, and a place where paper workers helped shape the direction of the industry's early labor movement.

After World War II, Hudson River Mill workers developed the production of coated paper for the company. Shifting economic forces resulted in the mill's closure in November 2002. The historic mill was slated for partial demolition during 2011. The work including asbestos removal was completed by Northstar Group Services.

Given the nature of their products, paper plants are highly flammable. Therefore, International Paper Company frequently used asbestos insulation in its walls, floors, and roofs as a protective measure. Asbestos insulation was also used on pipes and boilers throughout International Paper plants. This material, intended to protect people, instead turned out to severely damage their health. The producers did not reveal that their asbestos products were dangerous, even though asbestos was known to cause illnesses as far back as the 1920s. Consequently, many former employees of International Paper have been diagnosed with mesothelioma following decades of service.

=== Mill workers' strike ===
The International Paper strike was a strike begun in 1987 by paper mill workers affiliated with the United Paperworkers' International Union (UPIU) at a number of plants in the United States owned by the International Paper (IP) company. The strike extended into 1988 and the company hired permanent replacements for workers. The plant in Maine, known as the Androscoggin Mill, attracted national attention during this period. Ultimately, the strike ended with strikers defeated in their demands and permanently replaced with non-unionized workers. In 2006, International Paper sold this plant to Verso Holdings, LLC. In March 2023, the mill permanently closed.

The book Betrayal of Local 14: Paperworkers, Politics, and Permanent Replacements was written about the strike at the Androscoggin Mill. The book was written by Julius Gerson Getman, who was an attorney representing the striking paperworkers.

=== Acquisitions ===
==== 1986–2000 ====
In 1980, the company sold its Canadian newsprint mills and associated land to Canadian Pacific. This company eventually became Avenor, and later was purchased by Bowater. Part of the sale included the Rocky Brook fishing lodge in New Brunswick, and IP retained limited access to the lodge. Eventually IP bought the lodge back from Bowater.

In 1986, the company acquired the Hammermill Paper Company, founded in 1898, which managed eleven papermills nationwide, and had its corporate offices based in Erie, PA; in 1988, the Masonite Corporation; and in 1989, the German paper company Zanders Feinpapiere AG and the French paper manufacturer Aussedat Rey. In 1996, it purchased Federal Paper Board. In 1999, the company purchased Union Camp Corporation, and in June 2000 Champion International. Additionally, it owned shares in the Chilean company Copec.

==== 2012 ====
In 2012, International Paper acquired Temple-Inland in a deal valued at $4.5 billion. Temple-Inland then became a wholly owned subsidiary of International Paper. At the time of sale, Temple-Inland's corrugated packaging operation consisted of seven mills and 59 converting facilities as well as the building products operation.

==== 2020s ====
International Paper completed the acquisition of British packaging company DS Smith for $7.2 billion in January 2025.

In 2025, International Paper announced the sale of its global cellulose fibers business to private equity firm American Industrial Partners for $1.5 billion.

=== Restructuring, 2005–2006 ===
In 2005 and 2006, the company undertook a significant restructuring, selling over 6,000,000 acres (24,000 km^{2}) of forestland in the U.S., along with its coated paper, kraft paper, wood products, and beverage packaging businesses, as well as subsidiaries Arizona Chemical and New Zealand-based Carter Holt Harvey. The coated paper business (four mills in Maine, Michigan and Minnesota) were sold to Apollo Management and now operate as Verso Paper. The kraft paper business (composed of a kraft paper mill in Roanoke Rapids, North Carolina and a dunnage bag plant in Fordyce, Arkansas) was sold to Kapstone Paper and Packaging and operates as Kapstone Kraft Paper.

The beverage packaging business, now called Evergreen Packaging, was purchased by Carter Holt Harvey, following the purchase of CHH by Graeme Hart. The company sold its wood products division to West Fraser Timber, based in Vancouver, British Columbia. This included 13 sawmills, making West Fraser the second-largest producer of lumber in North America, after Weyerhaeuser Company.

== Company logo ==
The company's former logo was designed by American graphic designers Lester Beall and Richard Rogers in 1960. The logo featured the letters "I" and "P" which formed a stylized arrow also resembling a tree surrounded by a circle. A primary constraint in the design process was the need for a logo simple enough that it could be stenciled onto trees and lumber intended for paper production. On March 7, 2023, the company announced a rebrand to coincide with the company's 125th anniversary. The rebrand included a new logo which features a stylized monogram, composed of green elements forming the two letters. Each of the elements features a straight top line and a rounded bottom. The dark green emblem is placed on the left from the two-leveled title case inscription in a modern sans-serif typeface, in black.

== Headquarters ==
International Paper Headquarters
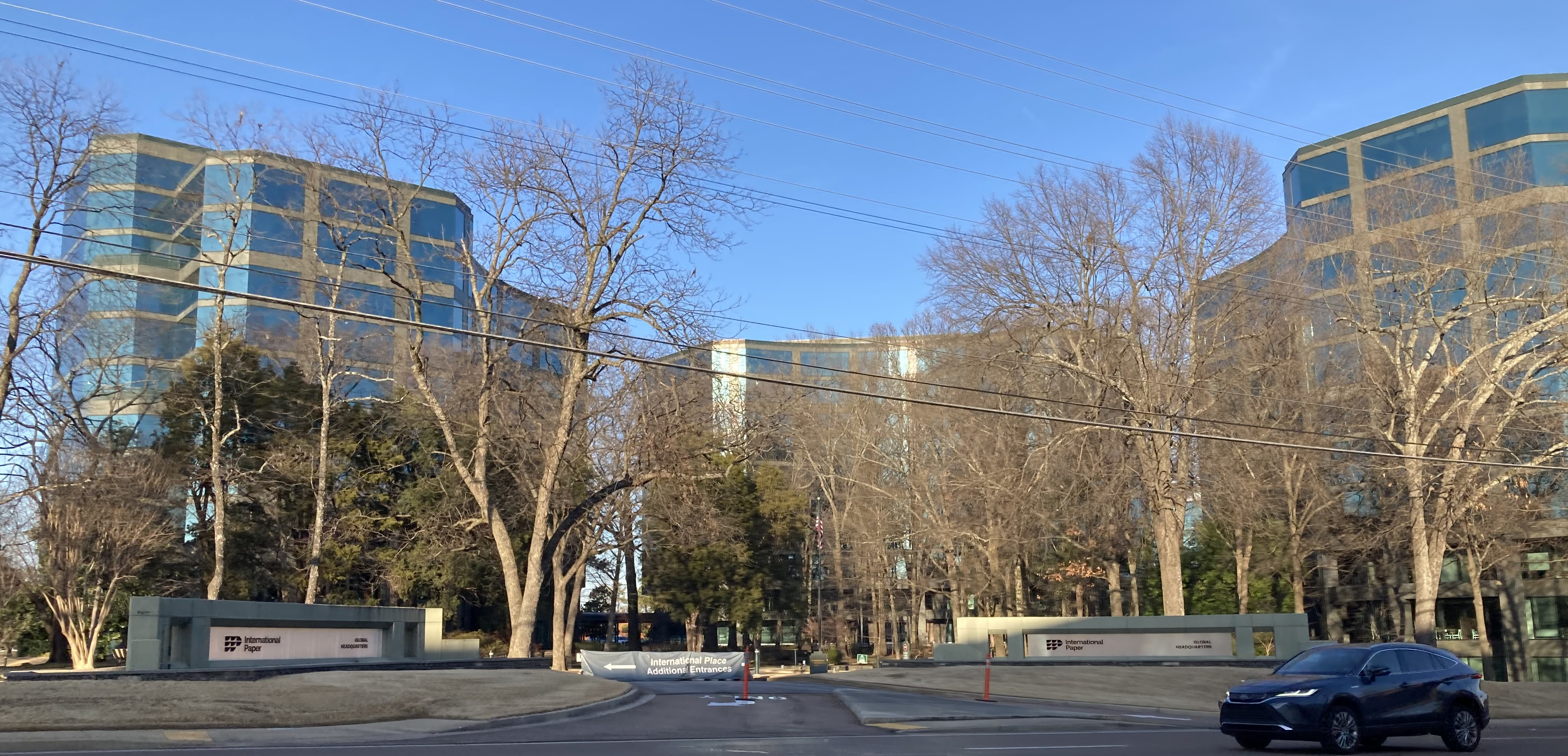
- International Paper's Headquarters in East Memphis

General information
- Type: Office complex (four buildings)
- Location: Memphis, Tennessee, United States
- Current tenants: International Paper
- Owner: Highwood Properties Inc.

Technical details
- Floor count: 10 (for each tower)

Design and construction
- Architecture firm: The Crump Firm

International Paper owns Tower I (at 6400 Poplar) and occupies the entire property and leases 50,000 square feet in Tower II (at 6410 Poplar) and all of Tower III (at 6420 Poplar).

In 2000, International Place Tower III was designed and rests amid the two existing towers and courtyard. The Crump Firm designed the eleven-story, 234,000 square foot tower to include offices, conference rooms, training rooms and dining facilities. The exterior granite was bought and warehoused in the mid-1980s with the intent that its construction would mimic that of the earlier towers. However, inclusion of seismic criteria to the Memphis building code in 1994 made the initial design unable to move forward. Therefore, architects had to completely change the original structural design in order to adhere to the strict exterior dimensions needed to utilize the existing granite and to match the existing towers.

In 2012, it was announced that International Paper was building a $90.2 million, 235,000-square-foot tower at 6430 Poplar Ave. in East Memphis.

In addition to the four office towers at International Place, the company operates an airport hangar facility (at 2522 Winchester Road) and a Southwind data center at (3232 Players Club Parkway). Other company related facilities include a recycling center on South Third and two warehouse operations across Memphis.

== Products and corporate structure ==
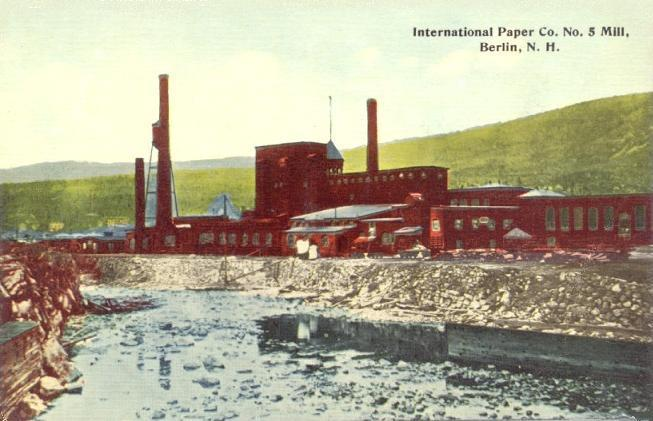
One of the old mills in the former "mill town" of Berlin, New Hampshire, owned by the International Paper, c. 1912

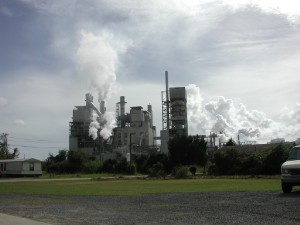
Pulp and converting paper mill, located in Georgetown, South Carolina

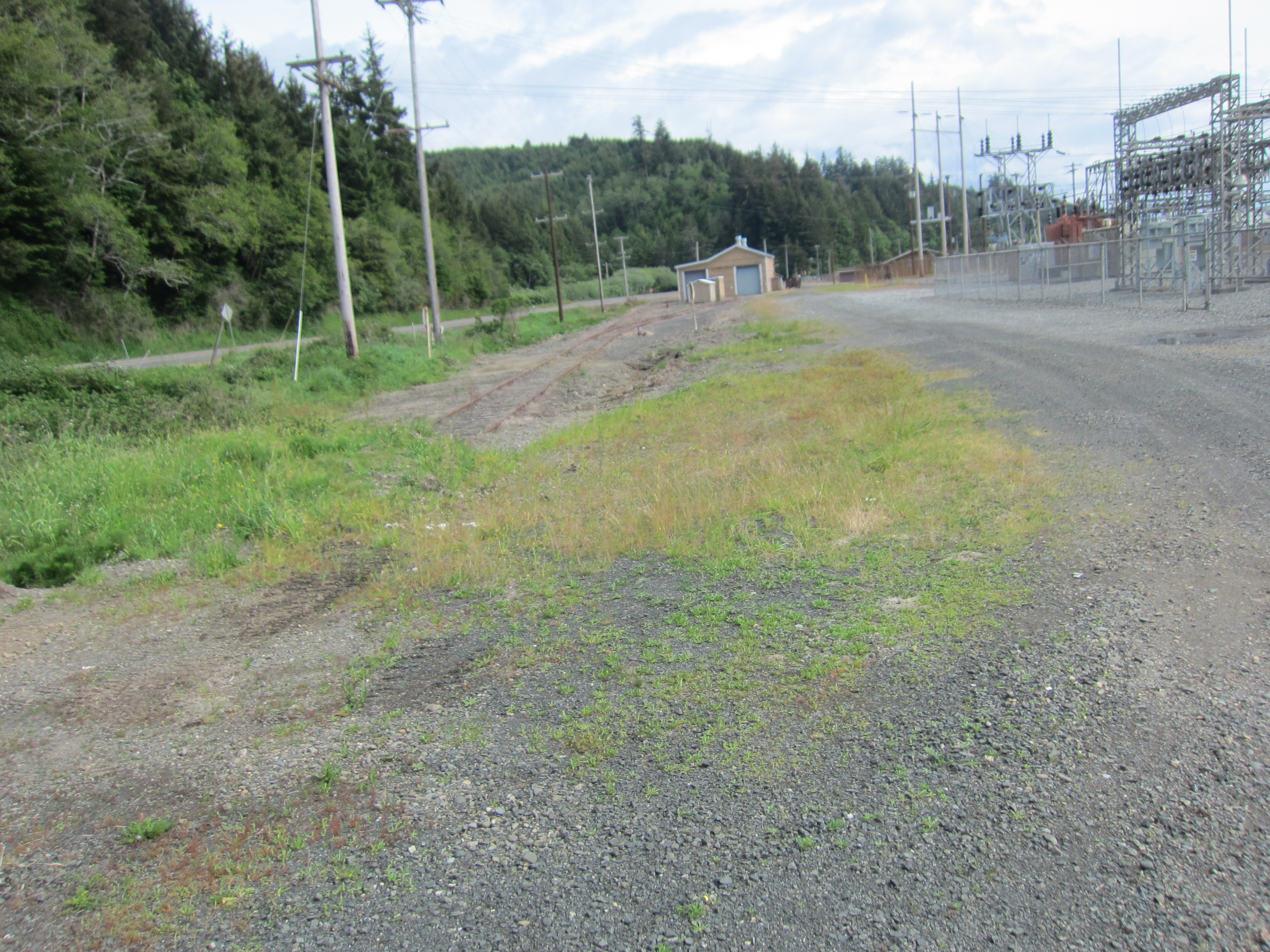
Outside the remnants of the International Paper mill in Gardiner, Oregon

Factory in Kwidzyn, Poland, at night

The company used to be the largest producer of plastic lids and paper cups, manufacturing for the fast-food giants McDonald's, Wendy's, and Subway, but its consumer packaging division was sold to Graphic Packaging on January 2, 2018. Its wood products division was sold in 2007 to West Fraser Timber Co. Ltd., a company headquartered in Vancouver, British Columbia. The company produces printer and copier paper, envelopes, corrugated packaging and pulp.

The company is a former Dow Jones Industrial Average component, included in the index from July 3, 1956, to April 7, 2004. It was one of three components to be dropped in the 2004 change, together with AT&T Corporation and Eastman Kodak.

Beginning February 1, 2007, the sale of the beverage-packaging division was completed as New Zealand billionaire Graeme Hart won the bid with purchase price of nearly $800 million. The division now operates under the Evergreen label.

On March 17, 2008, the company announced it was buying the containerboard unit of Weyerhaeuser for $6 billion in cash.

In October of 2007, it formed a joint venture with Ilim Holding, Ilim Group, the alliance in the Russian forest sector.

On July 1, 2014, the company announced the completion of the xpedx spinoff which merged with Unisource, creating an independent company, Veritiv Corporation.

On May 2, 2016, it announced the acquisition of Weyerhaeuser's cellulose fiber division. The acquisition was completed on December 1, 2016.

On October 1, 2021, a spin-off was completed creating a stand alone company by the name of Sylvamo. Sylvamo's headquarters are also located in Memphis TN. Divested were the Printing & Communications (White Uncoated Freesheet) mills in Ticonderoga NY, Eastover SC, Mogi Guacu Brazil, Luiz Antonio Brazil, Tres Lagoas Brazil, Saillat France, and Svetogorsk Russia.

== See also ==
- Companies listed on the New York Stock Exchange (I)
- Historical components of the Dow Jones Industrial Average
- List of New York companies
