= George Chisholm =

George Chisholm may refer to:

- George Chisholm (geographer) (1850–1930), British geographer
- George Chisholm (musician) (1915–1997), British trombone player and bandleader
- George Chisholm (hurdler) (1887–1920), American track and field athlete
- George King Chisholm (1814–1874), first mayor of Oakville, Ontario, Canada
- George Chisholm MacKay (1898–1973), Canadian First World War flying ace
- Brock Chisholm (George Brock Chisholm, 1896–1971), Canadian medical practitioner
