= John Chisholm =

John Chisholm may refer to:

- John Chisholm (archbishop of Melanesia) (1923–1975), Anglican bishop
- John Chisholm (Vicar Apostolic of the Highland District) (1752–1814), Catholic bishop
- John Chisholm (doctor), British general practitioner
- Sir John Chisholm (executive) (born 1946), British chairman and chief executive
- John Chisholm (police officer) (c. 1896–1958), Canadian police officer
- John Edwin Chisholm (1882–1964), lawyer and politician in Saskatchewan, Canada
- John T. Chisholm (born 1963), American prosecutor and politician
- John Chisholm (soldier), 16th-century Scottish soldier and firework maker
- John Alexander Chisholm (1859–1903), Canadian inventor and businessman

== See also ==
- Jack Chisholm (1924–1977), English footballer
- John Chisum (1824–1884), cattle baron in the American West
