= Companies listed on the New York Stock Exchange (I) =

== I ==
Stock name	Symbol	Country of origin
Iamgold Corporation	IAG	Canada
ICICI Bank Ltd.	IBN	India
Idacorp Inc.	IDA	US
IDEX Corporation	IEX	US
IDT Corporation	IDT	US
IFM Investments Limited	CTC	China
IHS Inc.	IHS	US
Illinois Tool Works Inc.	ITW	US
Imation Corporation	IMN	US
IMAX Corporation	IMAX	Canada
Imperial Holdings, Inc.	IFT	US
Imperva, Inc.	IMPV	US
Independence Holding Company	IHC	US
India Fund, Inc.	IFN	US
Industrias Bachoco, S.A.B. de C.V.	IBA	Mexico
Infoblox Inc.	BLOX	US
Infosys Limited	INFY	US
ING Groep N.V.	ING	Netherlands
ING Groep N.V.	IDG	Netherlands
ING Groep N.V.	IND	Netherlands
ING Groep N.V.	INZ	Netherlands
ING Groep N.V.	ISF	Netherlands
ING Groep N.V.	ISG	Netherlands
ING Groep N.V.	ISP	Netherlands
Ingersoll-Rand plc	IR	US
Ingram Micro Inc.	IM	US
Ingredion Incorporated	INGR	US
Inland Real Estate Corporation	IRC	US
Inland Real Estate Corporation	IRC.PRA	US
Inphi Corporation	IPHI	US
Insperity, Inc.	NSP	US
Installed Building Products, Inc.	IBP	US
Integrys Energy Group, Inc.	IEH	US
Integrys Energy Group, Inc.	TEG	US
Intelsat S.A.	I	US
Intelsat S.A.	I.PRA	US
Intercontinental Exchange, Inc.	ICE	US
InterContinental Hotels Group PLC	IHG	United Kingdom
International Business Machines Corporation	IBM	US
International Flavors & Fragrances Inc.	IFF	US
International Game Technology	IGT	US
International Paper Co.	IP	US
International Rectifier Corporation	IRF	US
International Shipholding Corporation	ISH	US
International Shipholding Corporation	ISH.PRA	US
International Shipholding Corporation	ISH.PRB	US
InterOil Corporation	IOC	Papua New Guinea
The Interpublic Group of Companies Inc.	IPG	US
Interstate Power and Light Company	IPL.PRD	US
InterXion Holding N.V.	INXN	US
IntraLinks Holdings, Inc.	IL	US
Intrawest Resorts Holdings, Inc.	SNOW	US
Intrepid Potash, Inc.	IPI	US
Intrexon Corporation	XON	US
Invacare Corporation	IVC	US
InvenSense, Inc.	INVN	US
Invesco Ltd.	IVZ	Bermuda
Invesco Bond Fund	VBF	US
Invesco California Value Municipal Income Trust	VCV	US
Invesco Credit Dynamic Opportunities Fund	VTA	US
Invesco High Income Trust II	VLT	US
Invesco Mortgage Capital Inc.	IVR	US
Invesco Mortgage Capital Inc.	IVR.PRA	US
Invesco Municipal Income Opportunities Trust	OIA	US
Invesco Municipal Opportunity Trust	VMO	US
Invesco Municipal Trust	VKQ	US
Invesco Pennsylvania Value Municipal Income Trust	VPV	US
Invesco Quality Municipal Income Trust	IQI	US
Invesco Senior Income Trust	VVR	US
Invesco Trust for Investment Grade Municipals	VGM	US
Invesco Trust For Investment Grade New York Municipals	VTN	US
Invesco Value Municipal Income Trust	IIM	US
Investment Technology Group Inc.	ITG	US
Investors Real Estate Trust	IRET	US
Investors Real Estate Trust	IRET.PR	US
Investors Real Estate Trust	IRET.PRB	US
Invitae Corp.	NVTA	US
Ion Geophysical Corporation	IO	US
Iron Mountain Inc.	IRM	US
IRSA Inversiones Y Representaciones S.A.	IRS	Argentina
iStar Financial Inc.	STAR	US
iStar Financial Inc.	STAR.PRD	US
iStar Financial Inc.	STAR.PRE	US
iStar Financial Inc.	STAR.PRF	US
iStar Financial Inc.	STAR.PRG	US
iStar Financial Inc.	STAR.PRI	US
Itau Unibanco Holding S.A.	ITUB	Brazil
ITC Holdings Corp.	ITC	US
ITT Corporation	ITT	US
ITT Educational Services Inc.	ESI	US
