= Eric Chisholm =

Australian rules footballer

Personal information
- Full name: Roderick Morrison Chisholm
- Born: 13 March 1892; South Yarra, Victoria
- Died: 25 September 1946 (aged 54); St Kilda, Victoria
- Original team: South Yarra
- Height: 177 cm (5 ft 10 in)
- Weight: 68 kg (150 lb)

Playing career^{1}
Years	Club	Games (Goals)
1919	Melbourne	5 (2)
- ^{1} Playing statistics correct to the end of 1919.

Roderick Morrison "Eric" Chisholm (13 March 1892 – 25 September 1946) was an Australian rules footballer who played with Melbourne in the Victorian Football League (VFL).
