= North Jay, Maine =

- Village
- Location within Maine
- Coordinates: 44°32′50″N 70°14′17″W
- Country: United States
- State: Maine
- County: Franklin
- Elevation: 377 ft (115 m)
- Time zone: UTC-5 (Eastern (EST))
  - Summer (DST): UTC-4 (EDT)
- ZIP code: 04262
- Area code: 207
- GNIS feature ID: 572352

North Jay is an unincorporated village in the town of Jay, Franklin County, Maine, United States. The community is located at the intersection of Maine State Route 4 and Maine State Route 17, 9.5 miles (15.3 km) south-southwest of Farmington.
