= Hugh J. Chisholm =

Canadian-American businessman (1847–1912)

Hugh J. Chisholm I
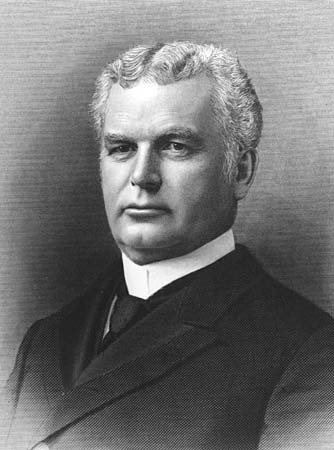
- Born: May 2, 1847; Niagara-on-the-Lake, Canada West, Province of Canada
- Died: July 1, 1912 (aged 65); New York City, United States
- Occupations: paper manufacturing magnate, railway president
- Known for: First president of International Paper Company founder of Rumford Falls, Maine, where he established Strathglass Park, a community of model homes for his employees
- Spouse: Henrietta Mason
- Children: Hugh J. Chisholm Jr.

Hugh Joseph Chisholm I (/ˈtʃɪzəm/ CHIZ-əm; May 2, 1847 – July 1, 1912) was a Canadian industrialist who later became a citizen of the United States. He was born in Chippawa, Canada West, to parents of Scottish ancestry. His early years as an entrepreneur in the news distribution business provided a foundation for his later accomplishments in the pulp and paper industry. His founding and leadership of pulp and paper, fibre-ware, and light and power companies as well as banks and railways made him a dominant figure in Maine industry. His legacy went beyond his reputation as a capitalist, however; he created the first forest management program for International Paper Company and developed a planned community for the workers in his mills which was a model for the nation.

== Early life ==
Hugh J. Chisholm was the fifth of ten children of Alexander Chisholm and Mary Margaret Phelan of Niagara-on-the-Lake in Canada West. He attended school there until he was thirteen, when his father's death made it necessary for him to leave school to help support the family. In Toronto, he found employment as a newsboy distributing newspapers to passengers on the Grand Trunk Railway and the steamboats, where he made friends with Thomas Edison, who was a newsboy on a nearby line.

An entrepreneur from an early age, Chisholm soon began buying his own copies of the papers, rather than selling them as an agent for another company. As his earnings grew, he was able to attend business classes at the Commercial College of Bryant and Stratton. In 1861, his brother joined him and formed Chisholm Brothers, which distributed papers over much of Canada and the Northeastern United States. By the time he was sixteen, he was able to buy out his former employer, hiring over two hundred newsboys to sell papers, magazines and books to railway and steamboat customers. This company developed into Chisholm Brothers Publishing in Portland, Maine.

== Industrialist and entrepreneur ==
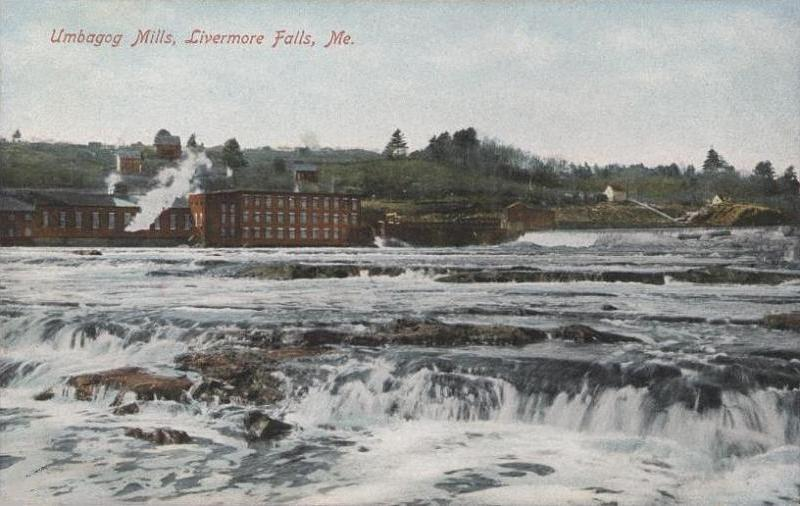
Umbagog pulp mills at Livermore Falls on the Androscoggin River in 1909

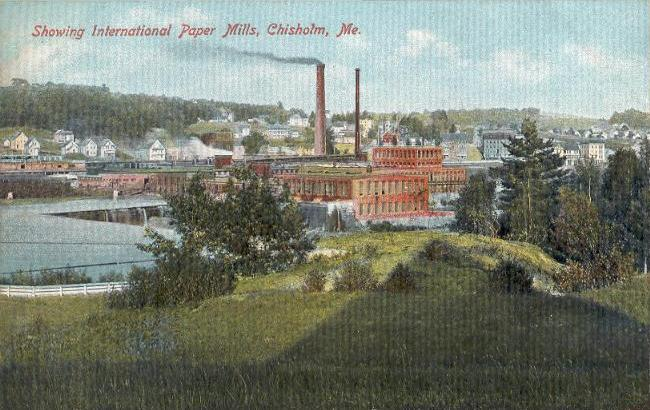
Otis Falls paper mills c. 1908 at Chisholm, the industrial village within Jay named for Hugh J. Chisholm

With his knowledge of what customers were reading, Chisholm Brothers began printing travel guides and founded a lithograph company in Portland, Maine, moving to half-tone photographs and then eventually, in 1888, to picture postcards. Chisholm became a U.S. citizen and moved to Portland in the mid-1870s.

After a foray into patenting and manufacturing fibre-ware products, Chisholm became interested in paper and pulp, and, with other capitalists whom he interested in his projects, started several pulp and paper companies in western Maine, including the Umbagog Pulp Company; Otis Falls Pulp and Paper Co.; Rumford Falls Paper Company, Somerset Fibre Company the Oxford Paper Company, the Rumford Falls Sulfite Company; the Continental Bag Company and, with the Hon. William A. Russell co-founded the International Paper Company in 1896. The Otis Falls Pulp Company mill in Jay, built in 1888, was then the third largest paper mill in the country. The Oxford Paper Company's mill in Rumford began producing paper in 1901, and subsequently produced all postcards for the United States Post Office. This mill became the largest bookpaper mill in the world under one roof, and has operated continuously since that time under several different companies. Chisholm was the second president of International Paper Company, succeeding its first president, The Hon. William Augustus Russell, who died suddenly in January 1899, after founding IP (with Chisholm), which was then the largest paper company in the world. Chisholm succeeded W. A. Russell as president from 1899 to 1907. The combined efforts of William A. Russell and Hugh J. Chisholm eventually brought together 30 pulp and paper mills from across US and Canada. Chisholm went on to initiate the first forest management program for that company and developed a close relationship with the Yale University School of Forestry.

Chisholm's entrepreneurial interests also included founding and leading the Livermore Falls Iron Foundry; Rumford Falls Power Company; Portland and Rumford Falls Railway, and the Rumford Falls and Rangeley Lakes Railroad.

== Community builder and philanthropist ==
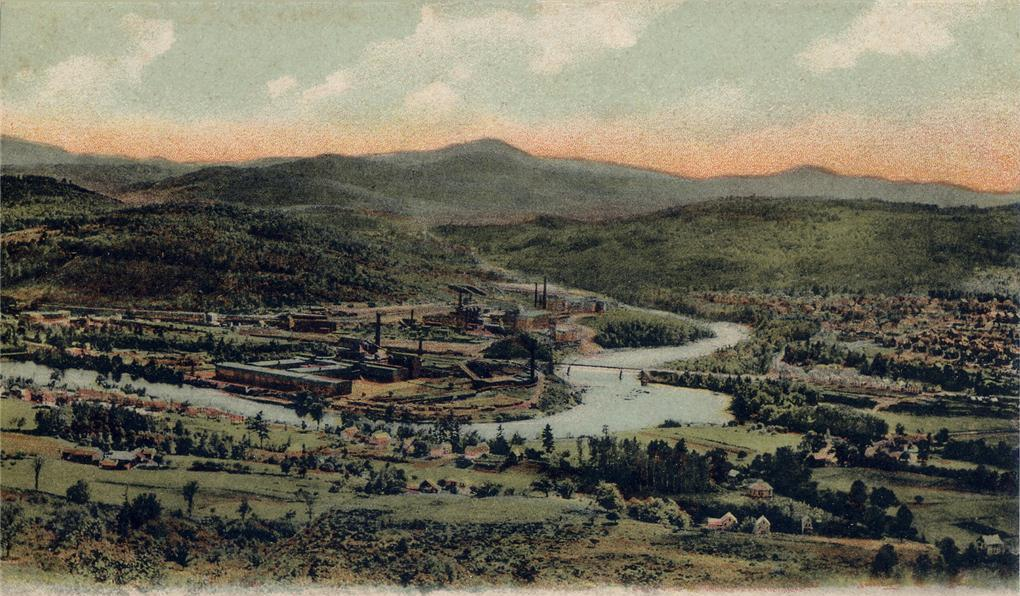
View of Rumford Falls in 1905

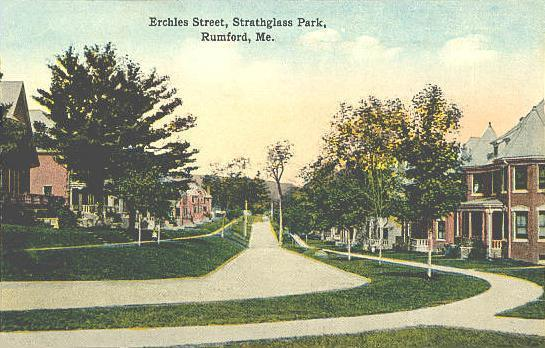
Strathglass Park c. 1912

Chisholm, with George N. Fletcher of Detroit and Charles D. Brown of Boston, acquired considerable land around Pennacook Falls on the Androscoggin River in Maine, where they planned the town of Rumford Falls. It grew up around the mills very much in accord with their plans. Chisholm had a particular interest in providing comfortable housing for the many mill workers who were attracted by employment from Europe, Canada, and other parts of the United States, and to that end researched mill housing initiatives at that time. He was aware of the slums and stacked tenements near mills in Manchester, New Hampshire, and Lawrence and Lowell, Massachusetts, and became convinced that satisfactory comfort and amenities were both practical and enlightened. He established the Rumford Realty Company and began construction of one of the first planned communities in Maine, and a model for the nation. The large brick and slate duplex houses with manicured lawns were to be arranged around treed parks. Named after his ancestral home in Scotland and designed and built by architect Cass Gilbert, Strathglass Park in Rumford provided housing for many mill workers.

His interest in developing a community in which people would want to live extended to other aspects of the town as well. In 1911, he founded the Rumford Mechanics Institute, a social and recreational center for residents which was partially supported through membership dues.

== Personal life ==
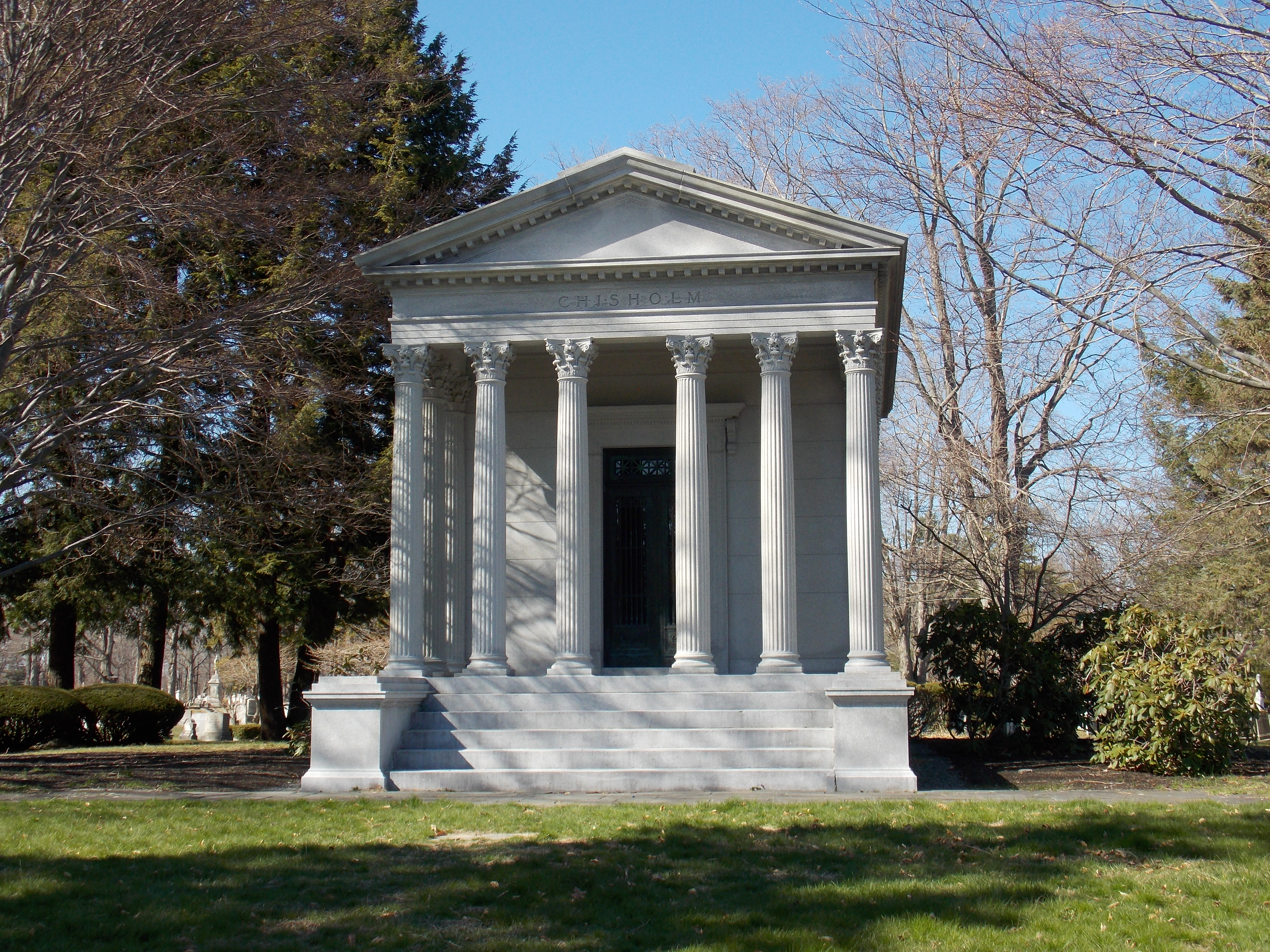
The Chisholm mausoleum in Evergreen Cemetery, Portland, Maine

On September 5, 1872, he married Henrietta Mason, of Portland, and they had one son, Hugh Chisholm Jr. Chisholm's son and then his grandson, William Chisholm, were subsequent presidents of the Oxford Paper Mill. Chisholm died in 1912 in his home at 813 Fifth Avenue, New York City. He is interred in an elaborate mausoleum at Evergreen Cemetery in Portland, Maine. It was commissioned by his wife after his death and has been described as one of the "most striking monuments" in the cemetery.
