= Donald S. Chisum =

American legal scholar

Donald Chisum
- Born: 1944 (age 81–82)

Academic background
- Education: Stanford University (AB, JD)

Academic work
- Discipline: Law
- Sub-discipline: Patent law
- Institutions: University of Washington; Santa Clara University

Donald S. Chisum (born 1944) is an American legal scholar specialized in patent law. His well-known, multi-volume treatise Chisum on Patents was first published in 1978.

== Education ==
Chisum earned a Bachelor of Arts and Juris Doctor from Stanford University.

== Career ==
From 1969 to 1996, Chisum worked as a professor of law at the University of Washington School of Law. From 1997 to 2006, he was a professor of law at the Santa Clara University School of Law.
