= Colin Chisholm =

Colin Chisholm may refer to:

- Colin Chisholm (ice hockey) (born 1963), former ice hockey defenceman
- Colin Chisholm (medical writer) (1755–1825), Scottish surgeon
- Colin Chisholm (politician) (1850–?), lawyer and political figure in Nova Scotia, Canada
- Colin Chisholm (singer) (born 1953), Scottish singer
- Colin H. Chisholm (1919–1994), Canadian politician
