= Giveback =

A giveback is a reduction or elimination of previously won benefits in trade union negotiations.

== History ==
1978: The first known publication of the term giveback in relation to organized labor negotiations was in The New York Times.
