= Chisom =

- Gender: Unisex
- Language: Igbo

Origin
- Origin: Nigeria
- Meaning: Chi follows me
- Region of origin: Igboland

Chisom // is an Igbo given name. It means "chi follows me".

== Notable people with the name include ==
- Chisom Chikatara (born 1994), Nigerian footballer
- Chisom Egbuchulam (born 1992), Nigerian footballer
- Chisom Leonard Johnson (born 1993), Dutch footballer
