= John Alexander Chisholm =

Canadian inventor and businessman (1859–1903)

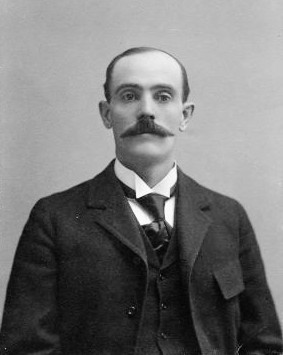
- John Alexander Chisholm
- Born: 1859; Oakville, Ontario
- Died: 1903 (aged 43–44)
- Occupations: Inventor and businessman

John Alexander Chisholm (1859–1903) was a Canadian inventor and businessman who developed the Chisholm-Scott Pea Viner, an agricultural machine for shelling peas. He sold these machines throughout Canada and the United States through the Chisholm-Scott Company.

== Early life ==
John Alexander was born in Oakville, Ontario to John Alexander Chisholm, Sr. and Sarah Petit Bigger. He was descended from William Chisholm (Upper Canada politician), the founder of Oakville. John's father owned the Oakville Basket Factory, which exposed him to industrial machinery from a young age, giving him the opportunity to develop skills in mechanical engineering.

== The Chisholm-Scott Company ==
John and his brother Charlie invented the first pea harvesting machine that could shell peas through impact. In 1890 their invention passed field tests in New York state, and the brothers soon formed a partnership with Robert P. Scott as the Chisholm-Scott Company. These pea viners had a series of paddles which struck the pea pods, compressing the air inside, which split the pods open and released the peas onto a conveyor belt. These machines could remove as many peas from pods as 600 workers could do by hand, vastly improving the efficiency of this branch of agriculture. The pea-viners were sold both in Canada and the United States, and the company found a large market for their product. The Chisholm-Scott Company had a factory and office in Niagara Falls, Ontario in addition to offices in Baltimore and Suspension Bridge, New York. On June 27, 1893 an improved pea-huller machine was created by the company.

The Chisholm-Scott Pea Viner was praised by the Pennsylvania Department of Agriculture for its efficiency and ability to greatly simplify the task of shelling peas. A report on the state's canning industry by George C. Butz wrote, "The pea canning business has been greatly modified in recent years by the invention of some remarkable machinery, particularly the Chisholm-Scott Pea Viner. Formerly a great army of pickers was necessary in pea canning section to pick the peas from the vines in the fields. Another army of hands was necessary to hull the green peas and so throughout the whole series of operations of canning peas the labour was excessive, tedious and expensive. Now the vines are cut with the scythe or mower, hauled to the factory and delivered to the viner or huller which shells and separates the peas from the vines, discharging the latter to one side and the former to the cleaner. The patentees and manufacturers of this viner are the Chisholm-Scott Co., Suspension Bridge, N.Y. They do not sell the machine, but place them with canners among a royalty basis in restricted territories."

The company was also involved in selling canned peas and other agricultural machinery. They developed an apparatus for spreading air exhaust to eliminate pea aphids during an epidemic of the insects in Maryland.

== Personal life ==
John married Emelda Beeler of Topeka, Kansas in 1896. They were married in Topeka with John's business partner Robert Scott acting as the best man. The couple had two daughters, Hazel Elizabeth Chisholm (1897–1978) and Grace Juliet Chisholm (1902–1964). John and Emelda lived in Oakville briefly, but Emelda felt uncomfortable due to the town's coolness toward Americans, especially from John's mother Sarah, who was descended from United Empire Loyalists and did not approve of her son's marriage. John and Sarah moved to Rochester, New York and later to Washington D.C., although they kept a summer home in Oakville named 'Mt. Vernon'.

John Chisholm died of typhoid fever in his home at Washington D.C. in 1903. The Chisholm-Scott Company continued after his death under the management of Robert Scott.
