= Chisholm Creek (Kansas) =

Stream in Sedgwick County, Kansas, U.S.

Coordinates: 37.631682°N 97.304767°W

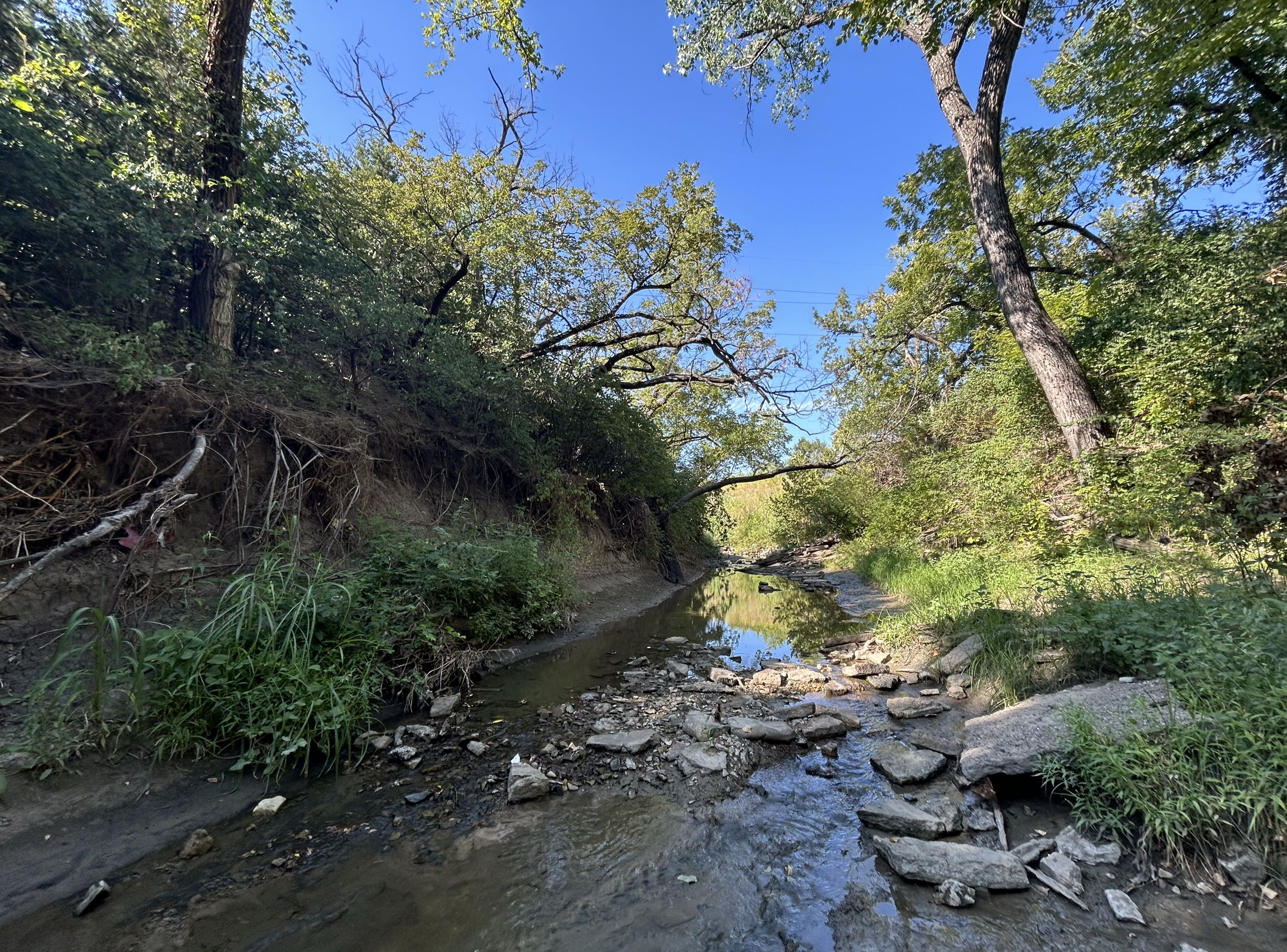
Chisholm Creek in 2026, between N. Hydraulic St. and Dr. Glen Dey Park in Wichita

Chisholm Creek is a stream in Sedgwick County, Kansas, in the United States.

Chisholm Creek was named for Jesse Chisholm, a pioneer who settled on the creek in the 1860s.

== See also ==
- List of rivers of Kansas
