= Anthony Chisholm =

Anthony Chisholm may refer to:

- Anthony Chisholm (actor) (1943–2020), American stage and screen actor
- Anthony Chisholm (politician) (born 1978), Australian Labor senator for Queensland
