= Lael Chisholm =

New Zealand children's book illustrator

- Education: Feilding High School
- Known for: Illustration
- Awards: Storylines Gavin Bishop award for illustration, 2017

Lael Chisholm is a New Zealand children's picture book illustrator. She is best known for her illustrations for the Granny McFlitter series written by Heather Haylock.

== Biography ==
Chisholm was educated at Feilding High School, where she was named dux in 2015. In 2017 she became the youngest person to win the Storylines Gavin Bishop Award for illustration, for her work on Granny McFlitter, the Champion Knitter, written by heather Haylock. In 2021 The Hug Blanket by Chris Gurney, illustrated by Chisholm, was a finalist in the picture book category at the New Zealand Book Awards for Children and Young Adults.

== Books ==
- 2018 – Granny McFlitter, the Champion Knitter, Heather Haylock, Penguin Random House (illustrator)
- 2019 – Granny McFlitter: A Country Yarn, Heather Haylock, Penguin Random House (illustrator)
- 2020 – The Hug Blanket, Chris Gurney, Scholastic New Zealand (illustrator)
- 2021 – Grandpa Versus Swing, Tania Sickling, Scholastic New Zealand (illustrator)
- 2022 – Granny McFlitter: The Knit Before Christmas, Heather Haylock, Penguin Random House (illustrator)
- 2023 – Granny McFlitter’s Eggcellent Easter, Heather Haylock, Penguin Random House (illustrator)
- 2023 – Grandpa’s Dashing Dessert, Tania Sickling, Scholastic New Zealand (illustrator)
