= Jori Chisholm =

American bagpipe player (born 1975)

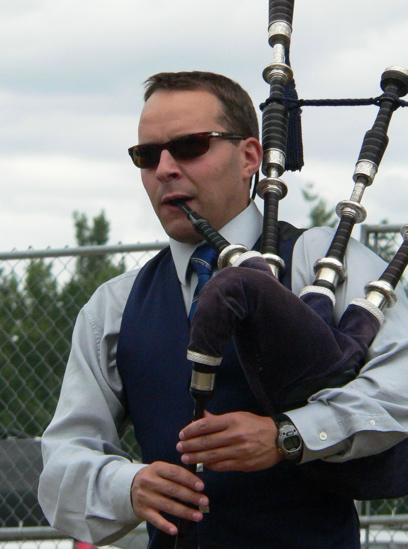

Background information
- Born: September 23, 1975 (age 51)
- Genre: Highland Fling
- Instruments: Bagpipes, Piano, Cello
- Years active: 1990s–present
- Website: www.bagpipelessons.com

Jori Lance Chisholm (born September 23, 1975) is an American professional bagpipe player and teacher who lives in Seattle, Washington. Chisholm is a successful solo competitor winning the United States Gold Medal four times and has placed in the top three in Scotland's Argyllshire Gathering Gold Medal competition. He played with the six-time Grade One World Champion Simon Fraser University Pipe Band and was a featured solo performer for the band on multiple occasions. Chisholm has performed in front of sold-out audiences with The Chieftains and with ex-Grateful Dead rocker Bob Weir and his band Ratdog, and has been featured as a soloist or band member on over 20 recordings. His debut solo album Bagpipe Revolution was nominated for Album of the Year by Pipes|Drums magazine. He writes the "Sound Technique" column for the National Piping Centre’s bi-monthly Piping Today Magazine. The New York Times featured Chisholm's online teaching program, BagpipeLessons.com, and described him as a "top-tier teacher" in a front-page story about the growth of Skype music lessons. A cover story in American Profile Magazine named Chisholm one of the "world's elite pipers."

== Biography ==
Raised in a Finnish-American bilingual household (hence the first name, which is Finnish), Chisholm, together with his siblings, began musical training early, beginning with the piano at the age of four and continuing with that instrument until high school, where he played the cello and sang various school choirs.

With siblings involved in Highland dancing, it was natural for Chisholm to migrate to the bagpipes, taking his first piping lessons at age 11 from a close neighbor and professional piper, Colin MacKenzie, who was the founder of the first American Grade 1 pipe band, the Blue Heron Bay Pipe Band.

Early on in his piping career, Chisholm performed exclusively as a soloist since there were few pipe bands where he grew up (and no pipe bands for youth). In those years, Chisholm attended piping workshops and competitions, as well as making an annual trip to the Coeur d'Alene Piping School in Idaho, where he studied piobaireachd under Pipe Major Evan MacRae and Andrew Wright.

After graduating from high school, Chisholm enrolled at the University of Puget Sound in Tacoma, Washington. While there, he traveled regularly to British Columbia to take lessons, progressing to the professional level of piping competition. After graduating from UPS with a degree in psychology in 1997, Chisholm was admitted to the national honorary society, Phi Beta Kappa. It was the following year that he joined the Simon Fraser University Pipe Band.

In 2000, Chisholm went on a solo competition tour in Scotland in an attempt to achieve sufficient piping prizes to meet the qualification standards for elite competitions the following year. He succeeded, and was invited to compete at the Argyllshire Gathering at Oban and the Northern Meeting in Inverness in 2001. In his first year competing at the elite level, he won the Royal Scottish Pipers' Society Bronze Star for 1st Place in the 'A' Marches at the Argyllshire Gathering at Oban and Runner-Up in the Silver Medal Piobaireachd at the Northern Meeting in Inverness.

Chisholm continues to compete internationally, taking top prizes in North America and Scotland. His first solo album, Bagpipe Revolution, was released in 2008 and was Runner-Up for the Reader's Choice Recording of the Year award by PipesDrums.

== Trivia ==
Chisholm is the grandson of the famous Finnish fighter ace Jorma Sarvanto.

Chisholm is a graduate of the Yamaha Music School.

== Solo prizes ==
- Cowal Highland Gathering Open 'A' Piobaireachd (2010) - 1st place (first American two-time winner)
- U.S. Gold Medal Piping Championship (2014) - 1st place (first four-time winner)
- U.S. Gold Medal Piping Championship (2009) - 1st place (first three-time winner)
- U.S. Gold Medal Piping Championship (2008) - 1st place (first two-time winner)
- Cowal Highland Gathering Open 'A' Piobaireachd (2008) - 1st place (first American winner)
- 3rd place in the Gold Medal competition at Oban (2006)
- United States Prize Pipe (2005) - 1st place
- Inaugural U.S. Gold Medal Piping Championship (2004) - 1st place
- Cameron-Gillies Challenge Recital (two-time winner - 2004 and 2005)
- B.C. Piper's Association Professional Knock-Out Competition (2004) - 1st place
- Western Regional Piping Championships (2004) - 1st place
- 4th place in the Gold Medal Piobaireachd competition at Inverness (2003)
- Runner-Up in the Silver Medal Piobaireachd at the Northern Meeting in Inverness (2001)
- 'A' Marches at Argyllshire Gathering in Oban (2001) - 1st place

== Discography ==
=== As a soloist ===
- Bagpipe Revolution (nominated for Album of the Year by Pipes|Drums magazine)
- Masters of Scottish Arts - Volume II: Live at Benaroya Hall
- Dr. Dan Reid Memorial Challenge Recital 2004
- The 2004 Band Room MASTERS: Recorded Live at the National Piping Centre
- The 2004 Band Room MASTERS Piobaireachd: Volume One (DVD)
- Winter Storm III: The Pipes and Drums Concert (2004)
- Simon Fraser University Pipe Band: On Home Ground: Volume One
- Winter Storm 2008: The Pipes and Drums Concert
- Winter Storm 2009: The Pipes and Drums Concert
- Simon Fraser University Pipe Band: Affirmation: Live at Glasgow Royal Concert Hall

=== As a band member ===
- Simon Fraser University Pipe Band: Live from New York City
- Simon Fraser University Pipe Band: Affirmation: Live at Glasgow Royal Concert Hall
- Simon Fraser University Pipe Band: On Home Ground: Volume One
- Simon Fraser University Pipe Band: On Home Ground: Volume Two
- Simon Fraser University Pipe Band: Down Under: Live at the Sydney Opera House
- Winter Storm 2006: The Pipes and Drums Concert
- Winter Storm 2007: The Pipes and Drums Concert
- Winter Storm 2008: The Pipes and Drums Concert
- Winter Storm 2009: The Pipes and Drums Concert
- Winter Storm 2014: The Pipes and Drums Concert
- The World Pipe Band Championships: 2001, 2002, 2003, 2004, 2005, 2006, 2007, 2008, 2009, 2010, 2011, 2012, 2013, 2014.

=== As a producer ===
- Bagpipe Revolution
- Masters of Scottish Arts - Volume II: Live at Benaroya Hall
- Masters of Scottish Arts - Volume I

=== As a composer ===
- Bagpipe Revolution
- Simon Fraser University Pipe Band: On Home Ground: Volume One
- The World Pipe Band Championships: 2005
- Raven: A Soft Wind Blows

=== With Bob Weir & Ratdog ===
- RatDog Live: At the Moore Theater in Seattle. February 17, 2007.
