= Les Chisholm =

Australian rules footballer

Personal information
- Full name: Leslie Walter Chisholm
- Born: 1 July 1888; Geelong, Victoria
- Died: 21 April 1923 (aged 34); Geelong, Victoria
- Original team: Corio

Playing career^{1}
| Years | Club | Games (Goals) |
| 1908–09 | Geelong | 3 (0) |
- ^{1} Playing statistics correct to the end of 1909.

Leslie Walter Chisholm (1 July 1888 – 21 April 1923) was an Australian rules footballer who played with Geelong in the Victorian Football League (VFL).
