= Aeneas Chisholm =

Aeneas Chisholm may refer to:

- Aeneas Chisholm (Vicar Apostolic of the Highland District) (1759–1818), Scottish Roman Catholic bishop
- Aeneas Chisholm (bishop of Aberdeen) (1836–1918), Scottish Roman Catholic bishop
