= Androscoggin Mill =

Pulp and paper mill in Maine, USA

Coordinates: 44.5086°N 70.2401°W

The Androscoggin Mill is a pulp and paper mill in Jay, Maine. At its peak, 1,500 workers were employed in the facility. In February 2023, management announced that the mill would permanently close in March 2023.

== Early history ==
Construction began in 1963 and was completed in 1965. The mill replaced the Riley Mill, which was located less than a mile away. The largest paper company in the world at the time, International Paper, built it. It was named for the nearby Androscoggin River.

== 1987–88 strike ==
In 1987–88, 1,200 mill workers and members of the United Paperworkers' International Union went on strike against the company, which was demanding wage reductions and other givebacks despite record profits. The mill eventually reopened with permanent replacements.

== Sales and closure ==
In 2006, International Paper sold the plant to Verso Holdings, LLC, and 1,000 people worked in the mill at that time. In 2015, Verso laid off 300 workers. A year later, it filed for bankruptcy. In 2017, it laid off an additional 300 people and idled a machine. In April 2020, a wood pulp digester exploded, destroying the mill's pulp machines. Pixelle Specialty Solutions, which had purchased the mill two months prior in February, decided not to rebuild. In September 2022, the company decided to permanently close the mill. In February 2023, Pixelle announced that the mill would cease production no later than March 9, 2023.
