= Margaret Chisholm =

Margaret Chisholm may refer to:

- Margaret E. Chisholm (1921–1999), American librarian and educator
- Margaret Covey Chisholm (1909–1965), American portrait painter and muralist
