= Gloria Chisum =

American academic

- Born: Gloria Twine; 1930 (age 95–96); Muskogee, Oklahoma
- Education: Howard University; University of Pennsylvania
- Known for: Developing protective eyewear for pilots in extreme conditions
- Awards: Raymond F. Longacre Award; Oklahoma Hall of Fame
- Scientific career
- Fields: Psychology; Visual problems associated with operating high-performance aircraft
- Workplaces: University of Pennsylvania; Navai Air Development Center

Gloria Twine Chisum (born 1930 in Muskogee, Oklahoma) is an experimental psychologist who eventually became a board member of the American Psychological Association, among many other organizations. An expert in visual problems associated with the operation of high-performance aircraft, she developed eyewear to protect pilots' eyes in extreme conditions like sharp turns, lightning, or nuclear explosion.

== Education ==
Chisum earned her BS (1951) and MS (1953), in psychology from Howard University. During her undergraduate years she pledged Alpha Kappa Alpha and was a part of the Howard University Players, a dramatic group run by students. In 1960, she earned her PhD from the University of Pennsylvania. Her dissertation was titled "Transposition as a Function of the Number of Test Trials".

== Career ==
During 1958–1968, Chisum taught psychology at the University of Pennsylvania. From 1960 to 1965, she researched psychology at the Naval Air Development Center. She served as the head of the Vision Laboratory from 1965 to 1980, and afterwards became the head of the Environmental Physiology Research Team. She was also a board member of several organizations, including (but not limited to) the Arthritis Foundation of Eastern Pennsylvania the Aerospace Medical Association, the American Psychological Association, and the Optical Society of America.

Her research led to optical advancements for pilots such as protective eyewear. Specifically, her work was focused on the creation of protective goggles that would help pilots withstand the extreme conditions sustained during flight including loss of vision during sharp turns and sudden flashes of bright light (such as those that could occur during lightning flashes or nuclear explosions), including work presented at a NATO conference. Her publications include a 1975 book on laboratory assessment of the AN/PVS-5 night vision goggle and a 1978 book on laser eye protection for flight personnel.

Chisum is the first African-American woman to join the Board of Trustees of the University of Pennsylvania.

== Personal life ==
In her hometown of Muskogee, OK, on Sept. 10, 1955 Chisum married Melvin J. "Jack" Chisum (died Oct. 22, 2014). Both have served as chairs of the University of Pennsylvania's Harrison Society. The town of Twine, Oklahoma is named after Chisum's grandfather.

== Honors ==
- Aerospace Medical Association's Raymond F. Longacre Award in 1979
- University of Pennsylvania Alumni Award of Merit
- Inducted Oklahoma Hall of Fame, 1984
- Drexel University College of Medicine Woman One Award in 2018
