= Richard Chisolm =

American cinematographer and film-maker

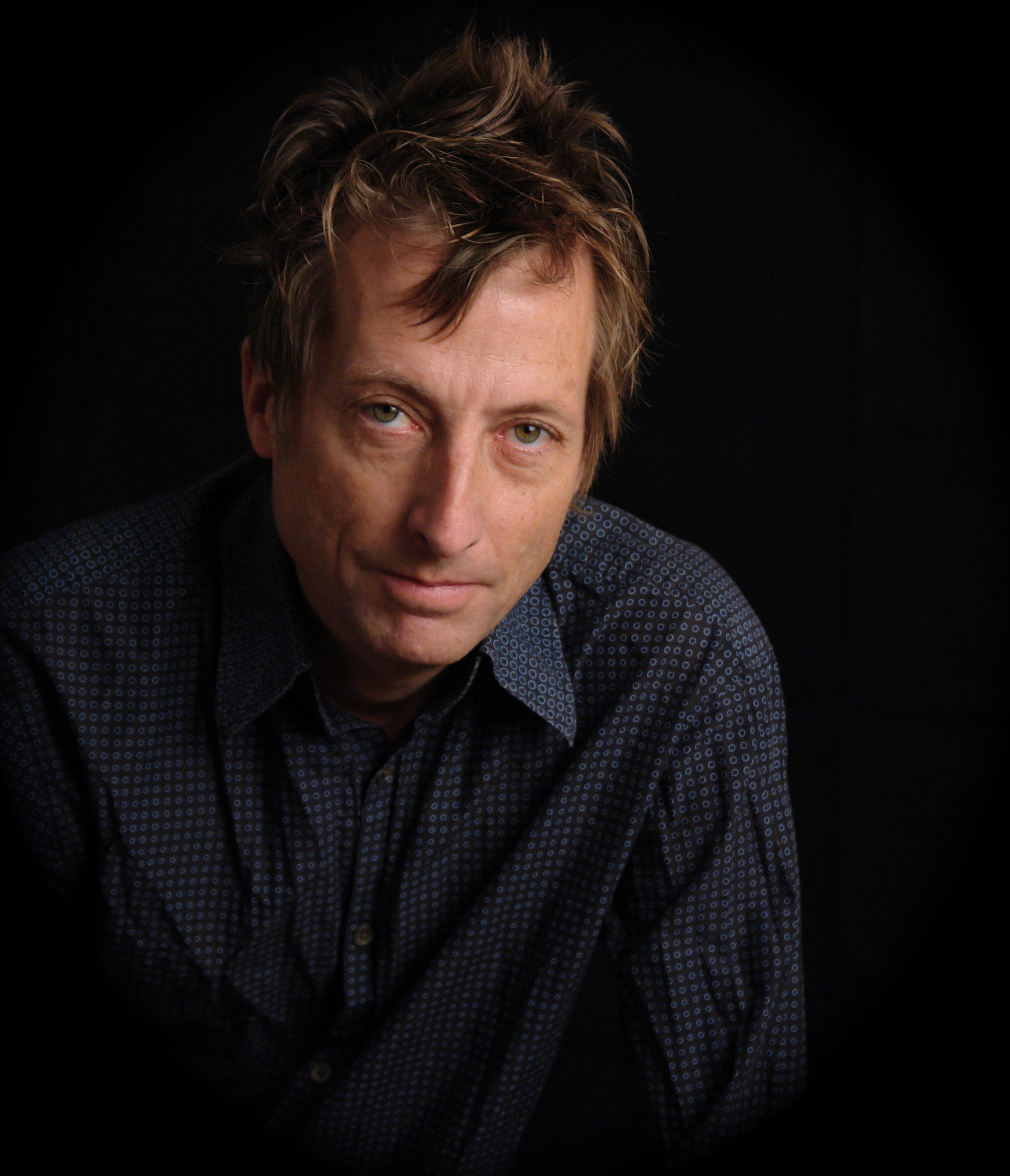
- Education: University of Maryland, Baltimore County
- Occupations: Cinematographer and film-maker
- Notable work: Don't Say Goodbye: America's Endangered Species
- Website: http://www.richardchisolm.com/

Richard Chisolm is an American cinematographer and film-maker based in the DC/Baltimore, Maryland area. Chisolm is most experienced in documentaries and actuality-style dramas. He has done additional camera work for feature films, television series, commercials and corporate and educational videos.

== Early life and education ==
Chisolm graduated from the University of Maryland, Baltimore County in 1982. In 2001, he was awarded "Distinguished Alumnus of the Year."

== Career ==
After graduating from college, Chisolm taught film classes at Johns Hopkins University until 1992. Don't Say Goodbye: America's Endangered Species, a piece he worked on for the National Geographic Channel, received an Emmy Award in 1998. The program followed two photographers who traveled the United States to take pictures of endangered animal and plant species. That year, Chisolm worked as a camera operator for Homicide: Life on the Streets, a television series featured on NBC. He served as director of photography for 24/7, a six-part documentary on Johns Hopkins Hospital produced by ABC, in 2000. In 2002, Chisolm screened three short documentaries at the Maryland Documentary Symposium. Chisolm shot and co-produced "The Building of a Sanctuary," a documentary about the architecture and setting of The Sheppard and Enoch Pratt Hospital, in 2003.

Chisolm spoke about school lunch reform at a TEDx event in May 2010. He directed and shot Cafeteria Man, a documentary on school food reform, in 2011. The documentary was screened at over 20 international film festivals and aired on PBS. He has shot documentaries for the American Red Cross in Zimbabwe and El Salvador, directed the camera for a PBS series on homeless children in Guatemala and shot eleven National Geographic documentaries. Chisolm has received a Peabody Award, a Columbia duPont Journalism award, two Kodak Vision awards and three CINE Golden Eagles.

== Filmography ==
- The Passing (1985)
- Local Heroes, Global Change (1 episode) (1990)
- Memory & Imagination: New Pathways to the Library of Congress (1990)
- Childhood (1991)
- American Experience (1 episode) (1994)
- Innovation (1997)
- Volcano: Nature's Inferno (1997)
- Arguing the World (1998)
- America's Endangered Species: Don't Say Good-bye (1998)
- Frontline (2 episodes) (1997/1998)
- Anatomy of a Homicide: Life on the Street (1998)
- Avalanche: The White Death(1998)
- American Masters (1 episode) (1999)
- American Byzantine (2000)
- Hopkins 24/7 (2000)
- In Bad Taste (2000)
- The Shape of Life (1 episode) (2001)
- Nurses (1 episode) (2001)
- Treasure Seekers: Mysteries of the Nile (2001)
- Treasure Seekers: In the Shadow of Ancient Rome (2001)
- Plagues: The Ebola Riddle (2001)
- The Rise and Fall of Jim Crow (2002)
- The Question of God: Sigmund Freud & C.S. Lewis (2004)
- Hunter & Hunted (4 episodes) (2005)
- Nova (1 episode) (2005)
- All the Dirt on A Dirty Shame (2005)
- 50/50 (2006)
- National Geographic Explorer (2 episodes) (2006/2007)
- The Truth About Cancer (2008)
- Waiting for Hockney (2008)
- Hopkins (7 episodes) (2008)
- The Response (2008)
- Bach & Friends (2010)
- Cafeteria Man (2011)
- Risk Takers (1 episode) (2011)
- What Love Is: The Duke Pathfinders 50 (2012)
- JFK: A President Betrayed (2013)
- American Secrets (2014)
