= Alexander Chisholm (artist) =

British painter

Alexander Chisholm (1792?–1847) was a British portrait and historical painter.

== Life ==
Chisholm was born at Elgin in the year 1792 or 1793; at an early age, he was apprenticed by his father to a weaver at Peterhead. He had a great aversion to the trade, and his predilection for art was so strong that he was accustomed to sketch figures upon the cloth on which he was occupied at the loom. When his leisure permitted him to resort to the sea-shore, Chisholm found great pleasure in sketching on the smooth sand. When about fourteen years of age, Chisholmwalked from Peterhead to Aberdeen, where he received his first lessons in light and shade. At this time, there was a meeting of the Synod, the members of which he was permitted to sketch. Chisholm's work gave such satisfaction, that he was forthwith commissioned to paint it, but this he was compelled to decline, as he was totally ignorant of the use of colours.

Chisholm must have employed his leisure profitably, for when about twenty years of age he went to Edinburgh, where he was patronized by the Earls of Elgin and Buchan, and was subsequently appointed an instructor at the Royal Scottish Academy. In 1818, he went to London, still under the patronage of the Earl of Buchan, and met with much encouragement. In 1829, Chisolm became an Associate Exhibitor of the Water-Colour Society and frequently sent works to that Institution. His favourite department of art was history, but he also painted portraits with eminent success. Having suffered from severe illness during nine years before his death, his later productions do not exhibit that degree of vigour which characterize his earlier works. 'The Pedlar,' a water-colour painting by him, is in the South Kensington Museum.

Chisholm died at Rothesay, in the Isle of Bute, on 3 October 1847.

== Works ==
The following are some of his most important works exhibited at the Royal Academy:

- Boys with a Burning Glass. 1822.
- The Cut Foot. 1823.
- Baptism of Ben Jonson's Daughter (wiih portraits of Shakespeare, Jonsonj Beaumont, Fletcher and Raleigh). 1837.
- The Lords of the Congregation taking the oath of the Covenant. 1842.
- The Minister and his Wife concealing the Scottish Regalia in the Church (his last work). 1846.
Mr. Wilkinson

Shall I fight or not?

Rev. Samuel Parr

Sir John Leslie
