= Chisholm, Maine =

- Census-designated place
- Location within Maine Location within the United States
- Coordinates: 44°29′45″N 70°11′52″W
- Country: United States
- State: Maine
- County: Franklin
- Town: Jay

Area
  - Total: 2.27 sq mi (5.87 km^{2})
  - Land: 2.19 sq mi (5.66 km^{2})
  - Water: 0.081 sq mi (0.21 km^{2})
- Elevation: 554 ft (169 m)

Population (2020)
  - Total: 1,343
  - Density: 614.4/sq mi (237.23/km^{2})
- Time zone: UTC-5 (Eastern (EST))
  - Summer (DST): UTC-4 (EDT)
- ZIP Code: 04239 (Jay)
- Area code: 207
- FIPS code: 23-12770
- GNIS feature ID: 2377898

Chisholm is a census-designated place (CDP) in the town of Jay in Franklin County, Maine, United States. As of the 2020 census, Chisholm had a population of 1,343. It is an industrial village named for Hugh J. Chisholm, who built the Otis Falls Pulp & Paper Company here in 1888 to use Androscoggin River water power.

== Geography ==
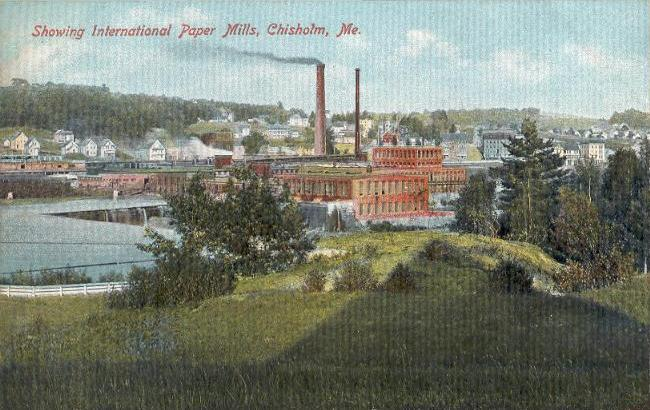

Chisholm is located along the southern edge of the town of Jay. It is bordered to the south by the town of Livermore Falls in Androscoggin and is contiguous with that town's urban core.

According to the United States Census Bureau, the Chisholm CDP has a total area of 2.19 square miles (5.66 km^{2}), all land. It is located on the east side of the Androscoggin River.

== Demographics ==
Historical population
Census	Pop.	Note	%±
2020	1,343		—
U.S. Decennial Census

As of the census of 2000, there were 1,399 people, 633 households, and 405 families residing in the CDP. The population density was 641.6 inhabitants per square mile (247.7/km^{2}). There were 688 housing units at an average density of 315.5 per square mile (121.8/km^{2}). The racial makeup of the CDP was 98.36% White, 0.36% African American, 0.36% Native American, 0.21% Asian, 0.36% from other races, and 0.36% from two or more races. Hispanic or Latino of any race were 1.00% of the population.

There were 633 households, out of which 24.0% had children under the age of 18 living with them, 48.2% were married couples living together, 12.0% had a female householder with no husband present, and 35.9% were non-families. 29.4% of all households were made up of individuals, and 15.3% had someone living alone who was 65 years of age or older. The average household size was 2.21 and the average family size was 2.69.

In the CDP, the population was spread out, with 20.8% under the age of 18, 8.0% from 18 to 24, 24.9% from 25 to 44, 25.7% from 45 to 64, and 20.6% who were 65 years of age or older. The median age was 43 years. For every 100 females, there were 90.1 males. For every 100 females age 18 and over, there were 85.3 males.

The median income for a household in the CDP was $35,500, and the median income for a family was $39,148. Males had a median income of $40,161 versus $23,438 for females. The per capita income for the CDP was $19,251. About 7.2% of families and 11.0% of the population were below the poverty line, including 17.4% of those under age 18 and 4.6% of those age 65 or over.
