= Alexander Chisholm (Upper Canada politician) =

Upper Canada politician

Alexander Chisholm (1790 – October 9, 1854) was a political figure in Upper Canada.

He was born in Scotland in 1790 and migrated to Glengarry County in 1817. In 1825, he became a colonel in the local militia. He represented the county in the 12th and 13th Parliaments. He died at Alexandria in 1854.
