= Chisolm massacre =

Coordinates: 32.7677°N 88.6510°W

The Chisolm Massacre occurred on April 29, 1877, in Kemper County, Mississippi, less than a month after the Reconstruction era was brought to a close. A judge and former sheriff named William Chisolm was accused of killing sheriff John Gully, a member of the Democratic Party, and was being held in the local jail. Also held there in protective custody were Chisolm's son, daughter, and two of his friends. A mob of around 300 Ku Klux Klan members stormed the jail and killed Chisolm, his 14-year-old son John Chisholm, his 19-year-old daughter Cornelia Josephine Chisholm, his friend John Gilmer, and two other men, A. McClellan and David Rosser. No one was convicted for the attack.

According to the Yorkville Enquirer, Chisolm was a Republican Party candidate for a seat in the U.S. Congress.

Southern papers applauded the lynching. The Yorkville Enquirer concluded its report on the "Tragedy in Mississippi" noting that: "Other hangings will probably follow." Governor John Marshall Stone refused to launch an investigation and U.S. President Rutherford Hayes did not comment on the killings. It was one of several reprisal actions in Mississippi during the period after Reconstruction. A freedman, Walter Riley, later confessed to killing Gully and was executed for the murder on December 7, 1877. He consistently maintained his guilt, but insisted that he alone was responsible for the murder. On the gallows, however, Riley indirectly implicated Judge Chisolm in the murder. He said he obtained the gun from Hezzie Jack, a former waiting boy for Judge Chisolm. Riley said Hezzie had persuaded him to commit the murder. Newspapers questioned why Hezzie would do this unless prompted to by Judge Chisolm. Riley said that as far as he knew, Judge Chisolm and John Gilmer had no involvement in the murder, but if they did, he did not know it.

The New York Times wrote about it. James Monroe Wells, a deputy revenue collector and U.S. Army veteran, wrote the book The Chisolm Massacre: A Picture of "Home Rule" in Mississippi about it. His criticisms of locals were responded to by James Daniel Lynch's account blaming Radical Republicans, Kemper County Vindicated, And a Peep at Radical Rule in Mississippi.
