= George Chisholm (geographer) =

Scottish geographer (1850–1930)

George Goudie Chisholm FRSE FRSGS LLD (1 May 1850 – 9 February 1930) was a Scottish geographer. He authored the first English-language textbook on economic geography: Handbook on Commercial Geography (1889) and the World Gazetteer, later to become known as The Times Gazetteer.

== Life ==
Chisolm was born in Edinburgh on 1 May 1850, the son of an actuary. He was educated at the Royal High School in Edinburgh, and then the University of Edinburgh, graduating in 1870.

He lectured on Geography in London from 1883 to 1908 and then returned to the University of Edinburgh where he lectured until 1923.

He served as Secretary to the Scottish Geographical Society for 15 years.

In 1923 he received an honorary doctorate (LLD) from the University, and elected a Fellow of the Royal Society of Edinburgh in 1924.

He authored the first English-language textbook on economic geography: Handbook on Commercial Geography (1889). The tables and maps were drawn by Alice Lennie, Assistant Lecturer at Edinburgh and one of Chisholm's former students. It was later revised by Kenneth Stamp. (ISBN 0-582-30015-0). He authored a review of Friedrich Naumann's Pan-German work on Central Europe which appeared in The Scottish Geographical Magazine issue 33, which condemned the aggressively militaristic overtones of Naumann's nationalistic work. His World Gazetteer of 1895, a huge project, later became commonly known as The Times Gazetteer.

On Sunday 9 February 1930 he died quietly on a tram in Edinburgh. He was 79.

== Publications ==
- The Two Hemispheres: A Popular Account of Peoples and Countries of the World (1882)
- A Pronouncing Vocabulary of Modern Geographical Names (1885)
- Handbook of Commercial Geography (1889)+ (1908)
- Longman's School Geography for South Africa (1891)
- Gazetteer of the World (1895) published by Longman
- Europe (2 vols) (1899)
- Junior School Geography
- Longman's School Geography for India and Ceylon
- The World As It Is: A Popular Account of Peoples and Countries of the Earth
- A Smaller Commercial Geography
- Longman's School Geography for Australasia

== Family ==
He married Florence Jones in 1884.

== Recognition ==
In 1917, he was awarded the Charles P. Daly Medal of the American Geographical Society.
