= LFHS =

LFHS may refer to:

- Bourg - Ceyzériat Airport in France (ICAO code)
- Lake Fenton High School, a high school in Linden, Michigan, USA
- Lake Forest High School (Illinois), Lake Forest, Lake County, Illinois, USA
- Lake Forest High School (Delaware), Felton, Kent County, Delaware, USA
- Little Flower High School Hyderabad, a school in Hyderabad, Andhra Pradesh, India
- Livermore Falls High School, Livermore Falls, Maine, USA
