= Bowman Airport =

Bowman Airport may refer to:

- Bowman Municipal Airport in Bowman, North Dakota, United States (FAA: BPP, IATA: BWM)
- Bowman Field (Kentucky) in Louisville, Kentucky, United States (FAA/IATA: LOU)
- Bowman Field (Maine) in Livermore Falls, Maine, United States (FAA: B10)
- Bowman Field (Montana) in Anaconda, Montana, United States (FAA: 3U3)
