= Livermore Falls, Maine =

Town in Maine, United States

- Town
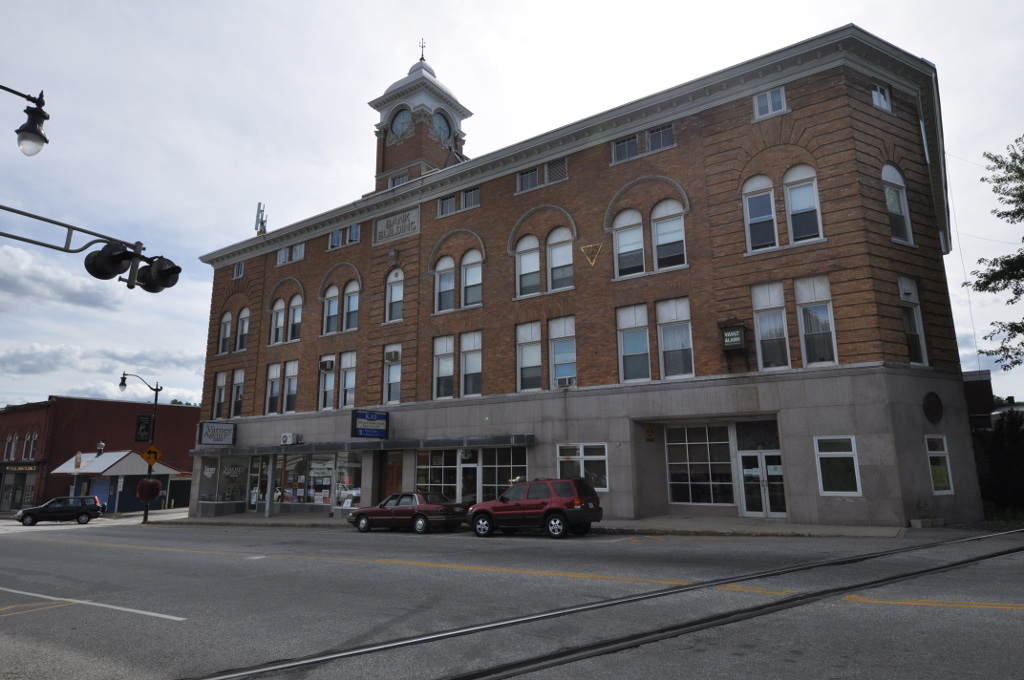
- Bank Building in downtown Livermore Falls

- Seal

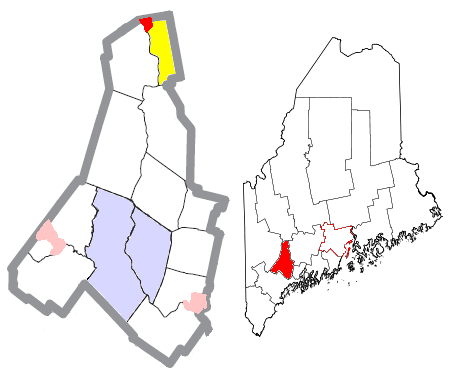
- Location of Livermore Falls (in yellow) in Androscoggin County and the state of Maine

- Location within the state of Maine
- Coordinates: 44°24′41″N 70°07′46″W
- Country: United States
- State: Maine
- County: Androscoggin
- Villages: Livermore Falls; East Livermore

Area
  - Total: 20.42 sq mi (52.89 km^{2})
  - Land: 19.68 sq mi (50.97 km^{2})
  - Water: 0.74 sq mi (1.92 km^{2})
- Elevation: 545 ft (166 m)

Population (2020)
  - Total: 3,060
  - Density: 60.2/sq mi (23.2/km^{2})
- Time zone: UTC−5 (Eastern (EST))
  - Summer (DST): UTC−4 (EDT)
- ZIP Codes: 04254 (Livermore Falls); 04228 (East Livermore)
- Area code: 207
- GNIS feature ID: 582567
- Website: lfme.org

Livermore Falls is a town in Androscoggin County, Maine, United States. The population was 3,060 at the 2020 census. It is included in both the Lewiston-Auburn, Maine Metropolitan Statistical Area and the Lewiston-Auburn, Maine Metropolitan New England City and Town Area. High school students in Livermore Falls attend Spruce Mountain High School.

== History ==
The area was once part of the Abenaki Indian territory called Rockemeka, meaning "great corn place". It would be granted by the General Court of Massachusetts in 1771 as Port Royal, awarded to heirs of veterans who served in the campaign against the Acadian capital of Port Royal in 1710. It was settled in 1786, then incorporated in 1795 as Livermore after Deacon Elijah Livermore, one of the first English settlers. The county line, determined by the Androscoggin River, divided the town. West of the river was Oxford County, and east was Kennebec County. Consequently, East Livermore (which encompassed a quarter of the original Port Royal grant) was set off and incorporated on March 1, 1844. It became part of Androscoggin County on March 31, 1854. On March 15, 1929, East Livermore was renamed Livermore Falls.

In the early 19th century, the region was predominantly farmland, with apple orchards and dairies supplying markets at Boston and Portland. It was noted for fine cattle. As the century progressed, gristmills, sawmills, logging and lumber became important industries, operated by water power from falls that drop 14 feet. With the arrival of the Androscoggin Railroad in 1852, Livermore Falls developed as a small mill town. Shoe factories and paper mills were established, including the Umbagog Pulp Company started by Hugh J. Chisholm. In 1897, the Third Bridge was built across the Androscoggin. It measured 800 feet in length, at that time the longest single-span bridge in New England.

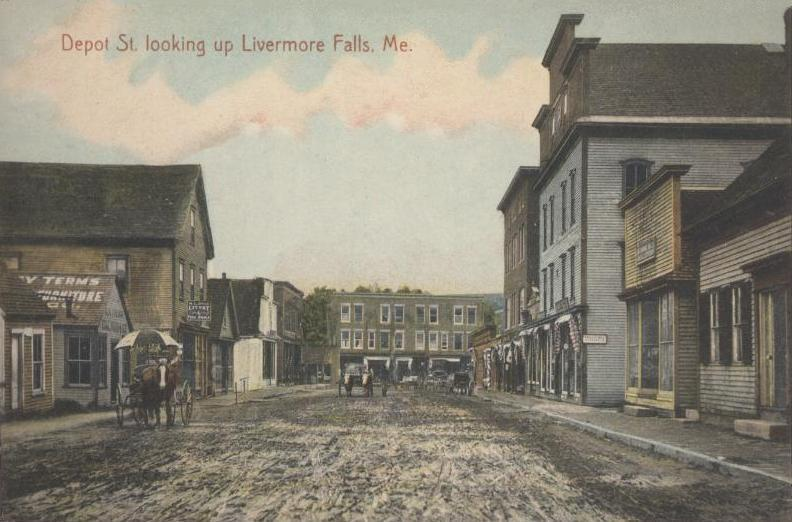
Depot Street in 1909

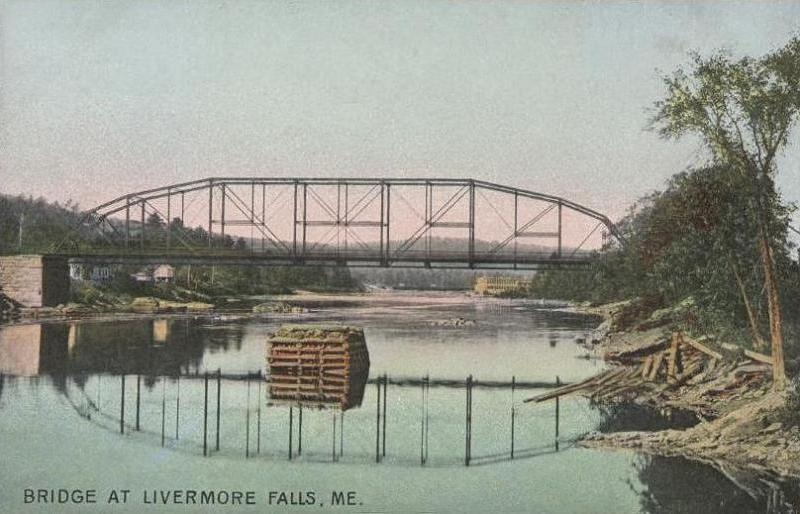
Third Bridge in 1909

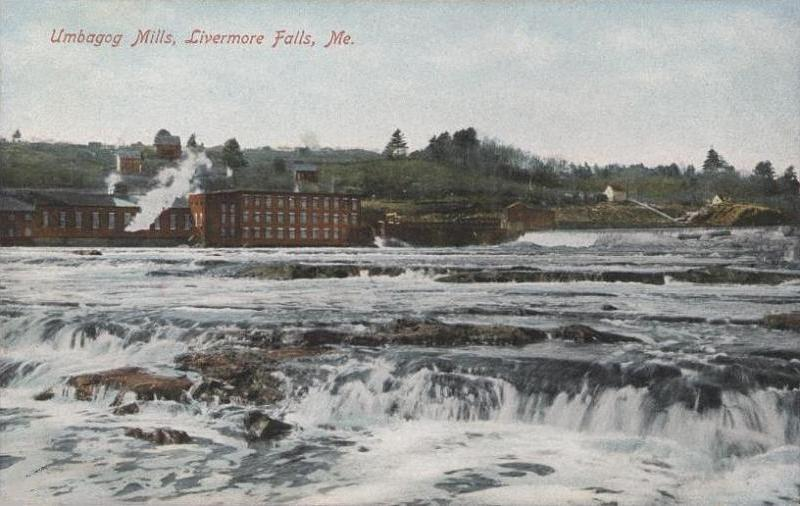
Umbagog Mills in 1909

== Geography ==
According to the United States Census Bureau, the town has a total area of 20.42 square miles (52.89 km^{2}), of which 19.68 square miles (50.97 km^{2}) is land and 0.74 square miles (1.92 km^{2}) is water. Livermore Falls is drained by the Androscoggin River.

=== Climate ===
This climatic region is typified by large seasonal temperature differences, with warm to hot (and often humid) summers and cold (sometimes severely cold) winters. According to the Köppen Climate Classification system, Livermore Falls has a humid continental climate, abbreviated "Dfb" on climate maps.

Climate data for Livermore Falls, Maine, 1991–2020 normals, extremes 2000–present
Month	Jan	Feb	Mar	Apr	May	Jun	Jul	Aug	Sep	Oct	Nov	Dec	Year
Record high °F (°C)	61 (16)	62 (17)	82 (28)	91 (33)	93 (34)	99 (37)	101 (38)	101 (38)	100 (38)	84 (29)	76 (24)	64 (18)	101 (38)
Mean maximum °F (°C)	49.7 (9.8)	50.2 (10.1)	58.3 (14.6)	75.6 (24.2)	86.8 (30.4)	89.1 (31.7)	91.1 (32.8)	89.3 (31.8)	87.0 (30.6)	75.4 (24.1)	65.0 (18.3)	53.4 (11.9)	93.1 (33.9)
Mean daily maximum °F (°C)	27.9 (−2.3)	30.7 (−0.7)	39.4 (4.1)	52.6 (11.4)	65.8 (18.8)	74.4 (23.6)	79.9 (26.6)	78.7 (25.9)	70.8 (21.6)	57.6 (14.2)	45.3 (7.4)	33.6 (0.9)	54.7 (12.6)
Daily mean °F (°C)	17.0 (−8.3)	18.5 (−7.5)	28.2 (−2.1)	41.2 (5.1)	53.4 (11.9)	62.3 (16.8)	68.2 (20.1)	66.1 (18.9)	58.0 (14.4)	46.1 (7.8)	34.8 (1.6)	24.1 (−4.4)	43.2 (6.2)
Mean daily minimum °F (°C)	6.1 (−14.4)	6.3 (−14.3)	16.9 (−8.4)	29.7 (−1.3)	41.1 (5.1)	50.3 (10.2)	56.5 (13.6)	53.6 (12.0)	45.1 (7.3)	34.7 (1.5)	24.4 (−4.2)	14.6 (−9.7)	31.6 (−0.2)
Mean minimum °F (°C)	−13.6 (−25.3)	−11.1 (−23.9)	−4.6 (−20.3)	17.3 (−8.2)	27.7 (−2.4)	37.9 (3.3)	45.7 (7.6)	42.1 (5.6)	30.5 (−0.8)	22.0 (−5.6)	10.3 (−12.1)	−4.8 (−20.4)	−17.7 (−27.6)
Record low °F (°C)	−27 (−33)	−23 (−31)	−20 (−29)	9 (−13)	23 (−5)	28 (−2)	39 (4)	36 (2)	22 (−6)	14 (−10)	−1 (−18)	−26 (−32)	−27 (−33)
Average precipitation inches (mm)	3.36 (85)	3.05 (77)	3.69 (94)	4.06 (103)	3.42 (87)	4.48 (114)	3.93 (100)	3.78 (96)	3.50 (89)	5.18 (132)	4.29 (109)	4.42 (112)	47.16 (1,198)
Average snowfall inches (cm)	19.8 (50)	26.6 (68)	15.9 (40)	3.2 (8.1)	0.3 (0.76)	0.0 (0.0)	0.0 (0.0)	0.0 (0.0)	0.0 (0.0)	0.4 (1.0)	4.7 (12)	20.3 (52)	91.2 (231.86)
Average extreme snow depth inches (cm)	17.5 (44)	21.3 (54)	18.9 (48)	7.8 (20)	0.3 (0.76)	0.0 (0.0)	0.0 (0.0)	0.0 (0.0)	0.0 (0.0)	0.5 (1.3)	3.5 (8.9)	12.4 (31)	24.3 (62)
Average precipitation days (≥ 0.01 in)	9.7	9.0	8.6	10.9	13.3	13.7	12.2	11.3	8.8	12.4	10.6	11.4	131.9
Average snowy days (≥ 0.1 in)	7.7	7.3	4.8	2.2	0.1	0.0	0.0	0.0	0.0	0.2	2.6	6.7	31.6
Source 1: NOAA
Source 2: National Weather Service (mean maxima/minima, snow depth, 2006–2020)

== Demographics ==
Historical population
Census	Pop.	Note	%±
1890	963		—
1930	3,148		—
1940	3,190		1.3%
1950	3,359		5.3%
1960	3,343		−0.5%
1970	3,450		3.2%
1980	3,572		3.5%
1990	3,455		−3.3%
2000	3,227		−6.6%
2010	3,187		−1.2%
2020	3,060		−4.0%
U.S. Decennial Census

=== 2010 census ===
As of the census of 2010, there were 3,187 people, 1,316 households, and 809 families living in the town. The population density was 161.9 inhabitants per square mile (62.5/km^{2}). There were 1,534 housing units at an average density of 77.9 per square mile (30.1/km^{2}). The racial makeup of the town was 96.1% White, 0.3% African American, 0.3% Native American, 0.3% Asian, 0.9% from other races, and 2.1% from two or more races. Hispanic or Latino of any race were 2.2% of the population.

There were 1,316 households, of which 33.9% had children under the age of 18 living with them, 40.8% were married couples living together, 14.3% had a female householder with no husband present, 6.4% had a male householder with no wife present, and 38.5% were non-families. 31.1% of all households were made up of individuals, and 12.7% had someone living alone who was 65 years of age or older. The average household size was 2.41 and the average family size was 2.95.

The median age in the town was 38.1 years. 25.8% of residents were under the age of 18; 7.8% were between the ages of 18 and 24; 25.6% were from 25 to 44; 25.6% were from 45 to 64; and 15.2% were 65 years of age or older. The gender makeup of the town was 49.2% male and 50.8% female.

=== 2000 census ===
As of the census of 2000, there were 3,227 people, 1,322 households, and 835 families living in the town. The population density was 163.4 inhabitants per square mile (63.1/km^{2}). There were 1,502 housing units at an average density of 76.1 per square mile (29.4/km^{2}). The racial makeup of the town was 97.27% White, 0.50% Black or African American, 0.62% Native American, 0.22% Asian, 0.03% from other races, and 1.36% from two or more races. Hispanic or Latino of any race were 1.02% of the population.

There were 1,322 households, out of which 33.0% had children under the age of 18 living with them, 44.8% were married couples living together, 13.2% had a female householder with no husband present, and 36.8% were non-families. Of all households, 30.8% were made up of individuals, and 12.9% had someone living alone who was 65 years of age or older. The average household size was 2.39 and the average family size was 2.95.

In the town, the population was spread out, with 27.8% under the age of 18, 7.6% from 18 to 24, 27.4% from 25 to 44, 21.8% from 45 to 64, and 15.3% who were 65 years of age or older. The median age was 36 years. For every 100 females, there were 96.1 males. For every 100 females age 18 and over, there were 90.4 males.

The median income for a household in the town was $30,102, and the median income for a family was $33,354. Males had a median income of $30,139 versus $22,381 for females. The per capita income for the town was $15,935. About 13.2% of families and 15.7% of the population were below the poverty line, including 17.7% of those under age 18 and 13.2% of those age 65 or over.

Voter registration

Voter Registration and Party Enrollment as of June 2014
Party	Total Voters	Percentage
Unenrolled	744	40.2%
Democratic	646	34.9%
Republican	351	19.0%
Green Independent	109	5.9%
Total	1,850	100%

== Transportation ==
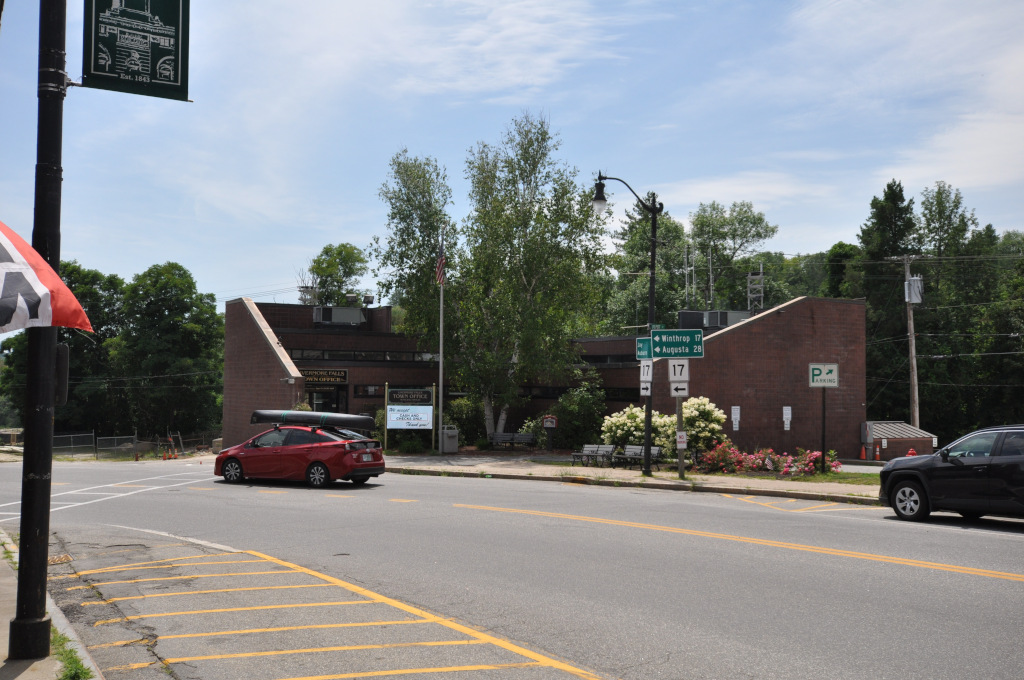
The town offices

The Bowman Field airport is located four nautical miles (5 mi, 7 km) southeast of the central business district of Livermore Falls.

== Education ==
Livermore Falls is part of Maine School Administrative District #36. MSAD 36 was renamed RSU 36 in 2009. The three schools in the district are Livermore Elementary School, Livermore Falls Middle School and Livermore Falls High School.

In 2010 RSU 36 consolidated with Jay Schools to form RSU 73 encompassing Jay, Livermore and Livermore Falls. Jay High School and Livermore Falls High School were renamed Spruce Mountain High School North and South campuses respectively. The Tigers and Andies mascots were replaced by the Spruce Mountain Phoenix. Livermore Falls Middle School was closed in the summer of 2011 and the students and faculty were incorporated into the new Spruce Mountain Middle School located at the former Jay Middle School building. Plans to unite the two high schools under one roof are being laid with a number of options available, a) Extend the current North Campus facility to accommodate the students and staff from the South Campus, b) Install portable buildings to increase the space at North Campus to facilitate the union of the high schools, c) relocate the Spruce Mountain Middle School to the South Campus and move the South Campus High School to the North Campus. The vote to allow the raising of a bond to enable the building of the planned extension failed in early 2012 and the other options are being examined.

== Notable people ==
- Kevin Bailey, Texas politician
- Louise Bogan, poet, critic
- Herbert Elijah Wadsworth, businessman
