= Spruce Mountain High School =

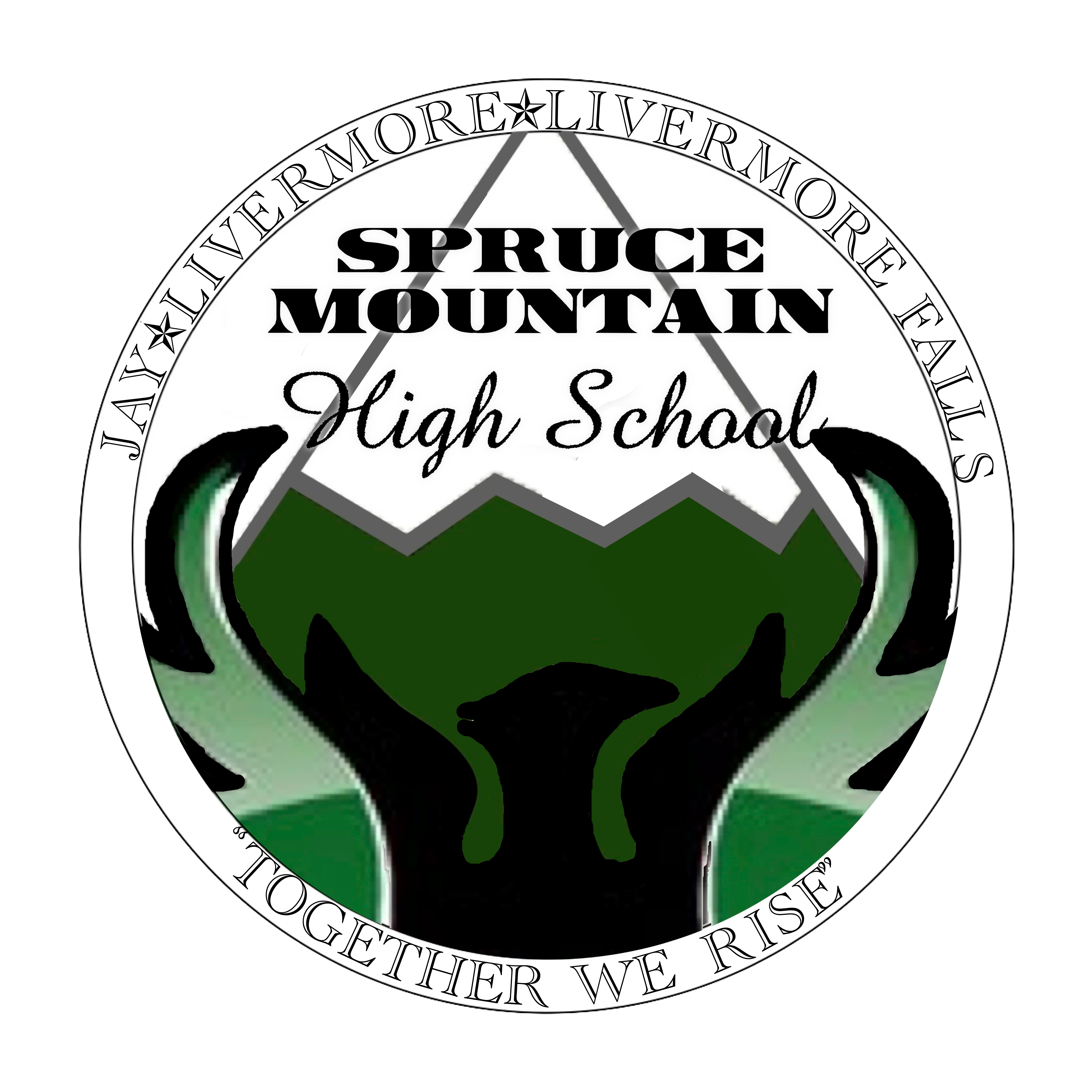

Location
- 33 Community Drive; Jay, Maine 04239; United States
- 44°29′40″N 70°11′58″W

Information
- Type: Public secondary
- Established: July 1, 2011
- School district: Regional School Unit 73
- Principal: Thomas J. Plourde
- Teaching staff: 35.90 (FTE)
- Grades: 9–12
- Enrollment: 408 (2022-23)
- Student to teacher ratio: 11.36
- Colors: Green, black, and white
- Mascot: Phoenix
- Website: www.rsu73.org

Spruce Mountain High School is a public high school located in Jay, Maine, United States. It serves students from Jay, Livermore, and Livermore Falls, Maine.

== Incorporation ==
Spruce Mountain High School was founded when Livermore Falls High School and Jay High School combined as the result of the consolidation between RSU #36 and the Jay School Department in 2011.

== Mascot and colors ==
The colors, the mascot, and the name of Spruce Mountain High School were chosen by high school and middle school students of Livermore Falls and Jay. The Phoenix was chosen as the consolidated high school's mascot to represent the end of a long-standing rivalry and the new chapter in the history of all three communities. The name Spruce Mountain comes from Spruce Mountain located in Jay, Maine.

== Campus consolidation ==
=== 2011–2012 ===
In the first year of consolidation, middle school students in RSU 73 all attended Spruce Mountain Middle School, in the building formerly occupied by Jay Middle School. High School students, though technically attending the same school, remained in separate buildings (Spruce Mountain High School at South and North Campuses).

=== 2012–2013 ===
Because splitting up a class after consolidation was deemed detrimental, the first consolidated eighth grade class was kept together and put at North Campus their ninth grade year, even though grades 10 through 12 were still separate. During this second school year, and throughout the consolidation process, multiple solutions were discussed for fully consolidating the High School. Among them was a five million dollar addition to North Campus, which was rejected by voters in May 2012. In November 2012, voters approved an almost two million dollar renovation to North Campus and Spruce Mountain Middle School, including a connector between the two, in order to accommodate students from all three member towns.

=== 2013-2014 ===
The renovation complete, Spruce Mountain High School opened for the first time as one school in the fall of 2013.
