= Livermore Falls High School =

Location
- Livermore Falls, Maine; United States
- Coordinates: 44°28′15″N 70°10′46″W

Information
- Type: Public secondary
- School district: Regional School Unit 36
- Grades: 9–12
- Enrollment: 361
- Colors: Green and Gold
- Mascot: The Andies
- Accreditation: Accredited
- Website: Livermore Falls High School www.rsu36.org

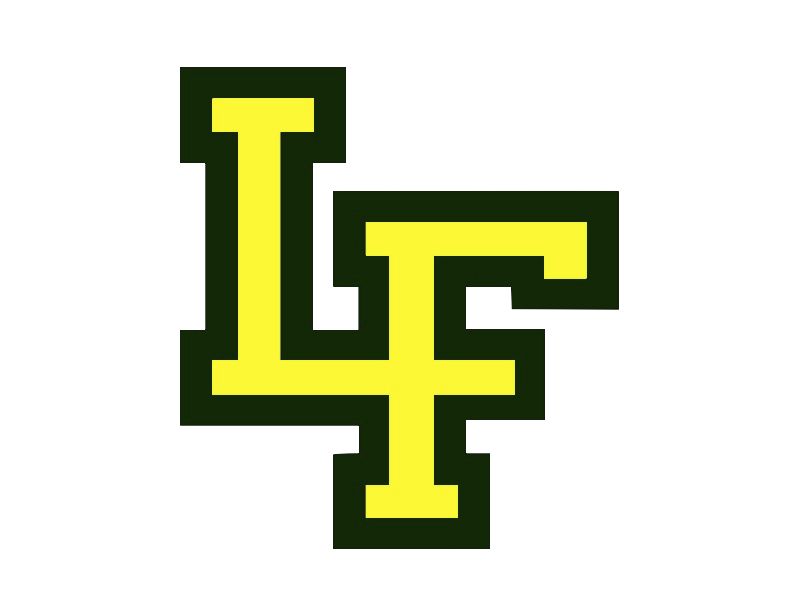
The LF Symbol

Livermore Falls High School was a public high school in Livermore Falls, Maine, United States. It was part of Regional School Unit 36, which included the neighboring town of Livermore. It consolidated with Jay High School in 2011 to form Spruce Mountain High School.

== Building ==
The former Livermore Falls High School, replaced by the current building in 1968

The last home of Livermore Falls High School was built in 1968. Before then Livermore Falls High School was located in the building that is the former Livermore Falls Middle School.

== Technology ==
In August 2010, the Livermore Falls board approved the purchase of 160 Apple computers at the price of $299 apiece. These computers were sought to equip each student at LFHS with a laptop computer. This purchase was made as part of the MLTI program.

== Sports ==
Livermore Falls High School participated in the following sports: Football, Soccer, Field Hockey, Golf, Basketball (men's and women's), Competitive Cheering, Skiing, Baseball, Softball, and Track.

Livermore Falls High School was a part of the Mountain Valley Conference. The Mountain Valley Conference includes Boothbay H.S., Carrabec H.S., Dirigo H.S., Hall-Dale H.S., Jay H.S., Lisbon H.S., Madison H.S., Monmouth Academy, Mt. Abram H.S., Mountain Valley H.S., Oak Hill H.S., St. Dominic Academy, Telstar H.S., Winthrop H.S., and Wiscasset H.S.

Livermore Falls had a well-storied rivalry with Jay High School in the neighboring town of Jay, which was most evident on the football field. Having begun in 1939, it was considered by some to be one of the most intense rivalries in the state. After the 2010 game, which was the 77th in the rivalry, the record for wins was Jay 40, Livermore Falls 36. On January 25, 2011 voters in Livermore Falls, Livermore, and Jay voted to consolidate school districts, effectively ending the rivalry. The combined team, known as the "Phoenix" plays their home games on the former Livermore Falls High School football field in Livermore Falls, and has had only moderate success since the merger.

== Notable people ==
- Chandler Woodcock, Republican candidate for Governor of Maine in 2006 taught at Livermore Falls.

== Consolidation ==
Livermore Falls Schools (MSAD #36) and the neighboring town school system in Jay consolidated into a single school system known as Spruce Mountain Regional School Unit (RSU #73). The school colors are black and green. Black remains a color from the old Jay Tigers colors: Black and Orange, while Green remains from the Livermore Falls Andies colors: Green and Yellow. The mascot for the new teams is the Phoenix. Consolidation took effect for the 2011-2012 school year. In the fall of 2013, all RSU 73 students began attending school at Spruce Mountain High School in the former Jay High School building.
