= Angus King =

American lawyer and politician (born 1944)

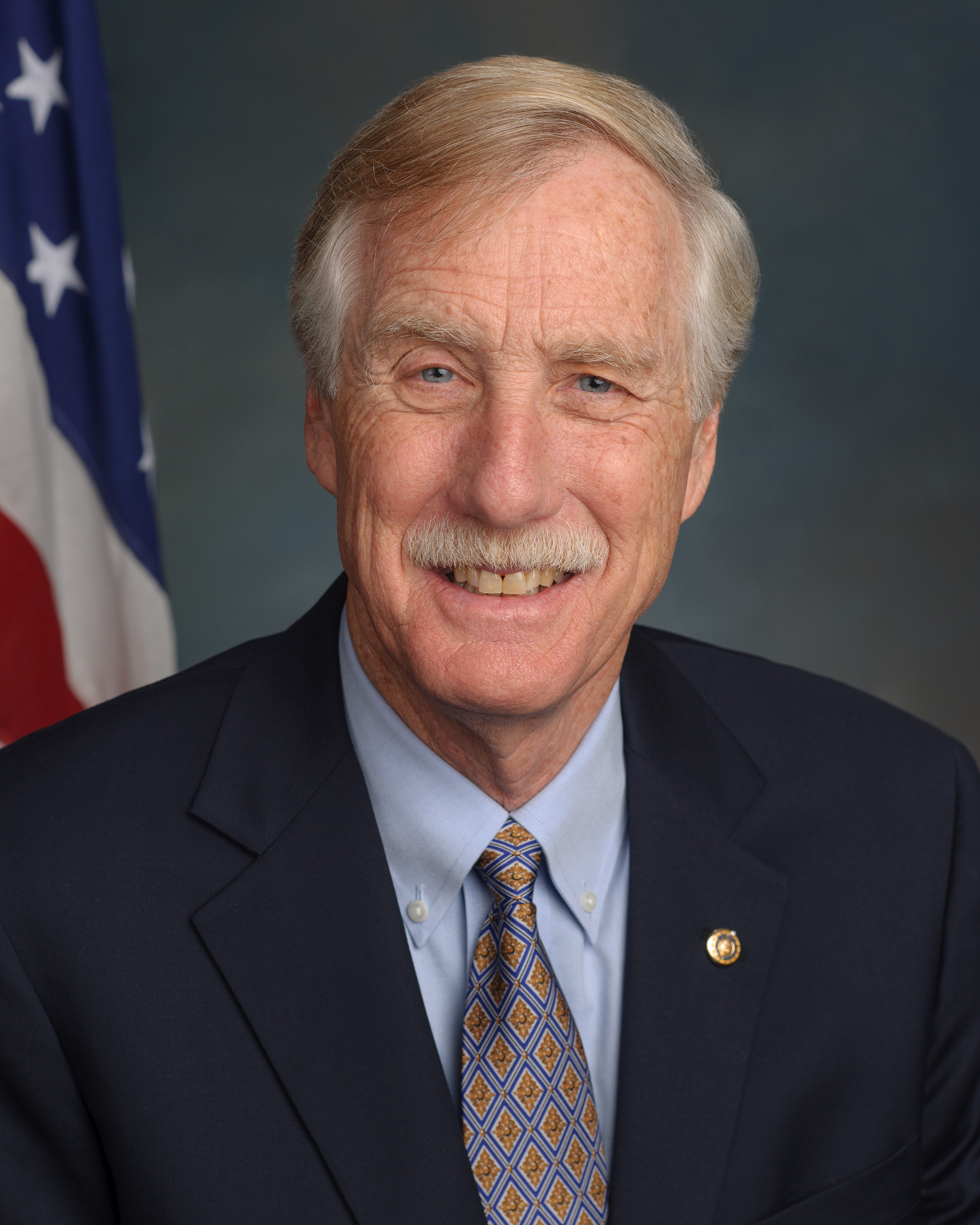
- Official portrait, 2013

United States Senator from Maine
- Incumbent
- Assumed office January 3, 2013 Serving with Susan Collins
- Preceded by: Olympia Snowe

72nd Governor of Maine
- In office January 5, 1995 – January 8, 2003
- Preceded by: John R. McKernan Jr.
- Succeeded by: John Baldacci

Personal details
- Born: Angus Stanley King Jr. March 31, 1944 (age 82) Alexandria, Virginia, U.S.
- Party: Democratic (before 1993); Independent (since 1993)
- Other political affiliations: Senate Democratic Caucus (2013–present)
- Spouses: Edith Birney (div. 1982); Mary Herman (m. 1984)
- Children: 5, including Angus III
- Education: Dartmouth College (BA); University of Virginia (JD)
- Website: Senate website Campaign website
- King's voice King supporting the Electoral Count Reform Act. Recorded August 3, 2022

Angus Stanley King Jr. (born March 31, 1944) is an American lawyer and politician serving as the junior United States senator from Maine, a seat he has held since 2013. A political independent who caucuses with the Democratic Party, he served from 1995 to 2003 as the 72nd governor of Maine.

Born and raised in Virginia, King moved to Maine after graduating from law school. In 1989, he founded Northeast Energy Management, Inc., a company that developed and operated electrical energy conservation projects. He won the 1994 Maine gubernatorial election as the independent candidate in a four-way race and was reelected in a landslide in 1998. As the United States' only independent governor, King enjoyed high approval ratings during his tenure. After leaving office in 2003, King returned to his business career.

King won Maine's 2012 Senate election to replace the retiring Republican Olympia Snowe. He was reelected to a second term in 2018, following the state's inaugural instant-runoff voting elections, and won a third term in 2024. For committee assignment purposes, he caucuses with the Democratic Party. He is one of two independents in the Senate; the other is Bernie Sanders of Vermont, who also caucuses with the Democrats. King is set to become Maine's senior senator when Susan Collins leaves office in 2027.

== Early life and education ==
King was born in Alexandria, Virginia, the son of Ellen Archer (née Ticer) and Angus Stanley King, a lawyer. His father was a U.S. magistrate for the Eastern District of Virginia.

King graduated from Francis C. Hammond High School in Alexandria. He then enrolled at Dartmouth College, where he earned a Bachelor of Arts in 1966. At Dartmouth, King joined the Delta Upsilon social fraternity. He then attended the University of Virginia School of Law, graduating with a Juris Doctor in 1969.

Soon after graduating from law school, King entered private law practice in Brunswick, Maine. He was a staff attorney for Pine Tree Legal Assistance in Skowhegan.

== Early career ==
In 1972, he served as the chief counsel to the U.S. Senate Subcommittee on Alcoholism and Narcotics. King served as a legislative assistant to Democratic U.S. Senator William Hathaway in the 1970s. He was also well-known statewide as a host on public television.

In 1973, when he was 29, King was diagnosed with an aggressive form of melanoma. King has said he believes he survived cancer only because he had health insurance, and has highlighted this experience when explaining his support for the Affordable Care Act.

In 1975, King returned to Maine to practice with Smith, Loyd and King in Brunswick. In 1983, he was appointed vice president of Swift River/Hafslund Company, which developed alternative energy (hydroelectric and biomass) projects in New England.

In 1989, King founded Northeast Energy Management, Inc., a company that developed and operated electrical energy conservation projects. In 1994, he sold the company. As of 2012, King's investments were valued at between $4.8 million and $22.5 million.

== Governor of Maine (1995–2003) ==
In May 1993, King announced he would run for governor of Maine as an independent in the 1994 election. Incumbent Governor John McKernan Jr., a Republican, was term-limited and could not seek another term. King abandoned his lifelong affiliation with the Maine Democratic Party. "The Democratic Party as an institution has become too much the party that is looking for something from government", King told the Bangor Daily News a few weeks after he announced his candidacy. The Republican nominee was Susan Collins, Commissioner of Professional and Financial Regulation under Governor John McKernan and a protégée of U.S. Senator William Cohen, and at the time relatively unknown to the electorate. The Democratic nominee was former Governor and U.S. Representative Joseph E. Brennan. It was Brennan's fifth campaign for governor, and he had been defeated by McKernan in 1990.

The general election was a highly competitive four-way race between King, Collins, Brennan, and Green Party nominee Jonathan Carter. King invested early in television advertising during Maine's unusually early June primary, allowing him to emerge from the primary season on an equal footing with his rivals. He positioned himself as a businessman and a pragmatic environmentalist focused on job creation and education. The Washington Times described King as an idealist who "wants to slash regulations but preserve the environment; hold the line on taxes; impose work and education requirements on welfare recipients; experiment with public school choice and cut at least $60 million from the state budget." One Republican activist claimed that King was more conservative than Collins. His opponents criticized him for flip-flopping. Collins argued King "presents different images, depending on who he is talking to. Angus has been a Democrat his whole life. In my opinion, he became an independent because he didn't think he could beat Joe Brennan in a primary. He's extremely smooth, articulate and bright, but he says different things to different groups."

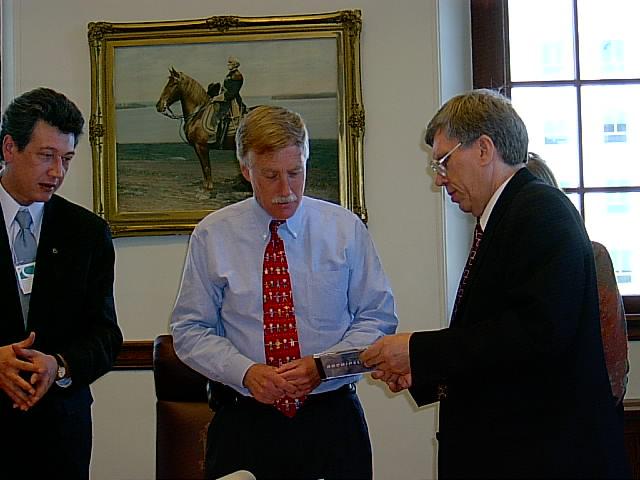
Maine governor King meeting with a Russian delegation in October 2002.

King narrowly won the November 8 election with 35% of the vote to Brennan's 34%, a margin of 7,878 votes. Collins received 23% of the vote and Carter 6%. King won eight counties, Collins five and Brennan three. King's election as an independent was preceded by fellow independent James B. Longley, elected to the same office 20 years earlier.

During his tenure, King was the only U.S. governor unaffiliated with a political party. He was also one of only two governors nationwide not affiliated with either of the two major parties, the other being Jesse Ventura of Minnesota, who was elected in 1998 as a member of the Reform Party. The terms of Connecticut's independent governor Lowell Weicker and Alaska's independent governor Walter J. Hickel both ended when King's began. In his 2004 book Independent Nation, political analyst John Avlon describes all four governors as radical centrist thinkers. As governor, King signed legislation requiring that all school employees be fingerprinted and undergo background checks.

King had an approval rating of 75% going into his reelection bid in 1998, which he easily won, garnering 59% of the vote and defeating Republican former congressman Jim Longley Jr. (the son of the former governor), who took 19%, Democrat Thomas Connolly, who received 12%, and Green Pat LaMarche, who took 7%. King's 59% was the highest share of the vote a Maine gubernatorial candidate had received since Brennan's 1982 reelection with 62%. Brennan's 1982 victory was also the last time until 1998 that a Maine gubernatorial candidate had won a majority of the vote, and King's 1998 reelection was the last time a Maine gubernatorial candidate received the majority of the vote until 2018.

In 2002, King launched the Maine Learning Technology Initiative (MLTI) to provide laptops for every public middle-school student in the state, the first initiative of its kind in the nation. It met with considerable resistance due to its cost but was enacted by the Maine Legislature. On September 5, 2002, the state began the program with a four-year $37.2-million contract with Apple Inc. to equip all 7th- and 8th-grade students and teachers in the state with laptops.

== Hiatus from politics (2003–2012) ==
The day after he left office in 2003, King, his wife, Mary Herman, and their two children, who were 12 and 9 at the time, embarked on a road trip in a 40-foot (12m) motor home to see America. Over the next six months, the family traveled 15,000 miles (24,000 km) and visited 33 states before returning home in June 2003.

During his post-gubernatorial residency in Maine, he lectured at Bowdoin College in Brunswick and Bates College in Lewiston. He was appointed a visiting lecturer at Bowdoin in 2004 and an endowed lecturer at Bates in 2009, teaching courses in American politics and political leadership at both institutions.

In 2007, King and Rob Gardiner, formerly of the Maine Public Broadcasting Network, formed Independence Wind, a wind energy company. In August 2009, Independence Wind along with joint venture partner Wagner Forest Management won Maine DEP approval for construction of a proposed $120-million, 22-turbine, utility-scale wind power project along a prominent mountain ridge in Roxbury, Maine. To avoid the appearance of a conflict of interest, King sold his share of the company after entering the 2012 U.S. Senate election. Of the project, King has said, "People who say wind is only an intermittent resource are looking for a one-shot solution. And my experience is that there are rarely silver bullets, but there is often silver buckshot. Wind is an adjunct source of energy. Ten percent, 20% can be very significant".

== U.S. Senate (2013–present) ==
=== Elections ===
==== 2012 ====
On March 5, 2012, King announced that he was running for the United States Senate seat being vacated by Olympia Snowe. King said "hogwash" to allegations by some Republicans that he had cut a deal with Democrats to keep U.S. Rep. Chellie Pingree out of the race.

King's Senate campaign came under scrutiny for posting a heavily edited newspaper profile of him on its website.

On November 6, 2012, King won the Senate race with 53% of the vote, beating Democrat Cynthia Dill and Republican Charlie Summers and carrying all 16 of the state's counties. The following week, King announced that he would caucus with Senate Democrats, explaining not only that it made more sense to affiliate with the party that had a clear majority, but that he would have been largely excluded from the committee process had he not caucused with a party. King said he had not ruled out caucusing with the Republicans if they took control of the Senate in the 2014 elections, but when Republicans did win the majority that year, he remained in the Democratic caucus. King remained in the Democratic caucus after the 2016, 2018, and the 2020 elections, the first two of which also resulted in Republican Senate majorities and the last of which produced a 50–50 tie.

==== 2018 ====
On November 6, 2018, King was reelected, defeating Republican State Senator Eric Brakey and Democrat Zak Ringelstein with 54% of the vote. Despite the increased vote share, King lost Piscataquis and Somerset Counties to Brakey, the first time he had lost a county in an election since his 1994 campaign for governor.

==== 2024 ====
On November 5, 2024, King was reelected to a third term, defeating Republican Demi Kouzounas, Democrat David Costello, and independent Jason Cherry with 52% of the vote. Upon turning 81 on March 31, 2025, he became the oldest U.S. senator in Maine history.

=== Tenure ===
==== 113th Congress (2013–2015) ====
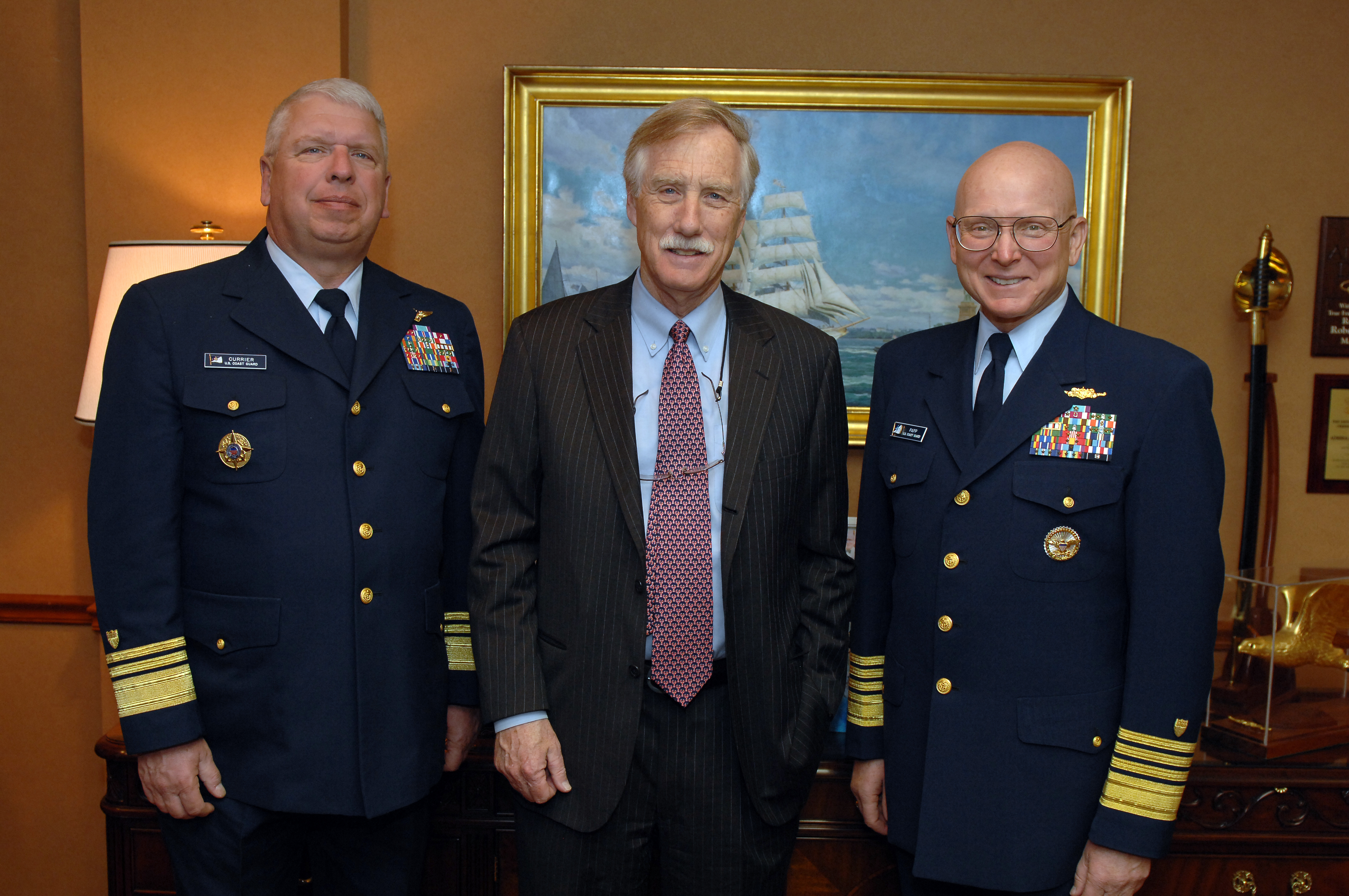
King with Coast Guard officials in Washington, 2013.

King supported reform of the Senate filibuster, noting that senators are no longer required to stand on the floor and speak during a filibuster. He also pointed out that the Constitution contains no 60-vote requirement to conduct business in the Senate. In 2013, King voted in favor of the so-called nuclear option to eliminate the filibuster for most presidential nominees.

King opposed attempts by the U.S. House to cut $40 billion from the Supplemental Nutrition Assistance Program over 10 years, fearing that it "would affect people in a serious way" and drive more people to soup kitchens and food banks. He supported the more modest Senate efforts to save $4 billion over the same period by closing loopholes.

In 2014, King was chosen for the annual tradition of reading George Washington's Farewell Address to the Senate.

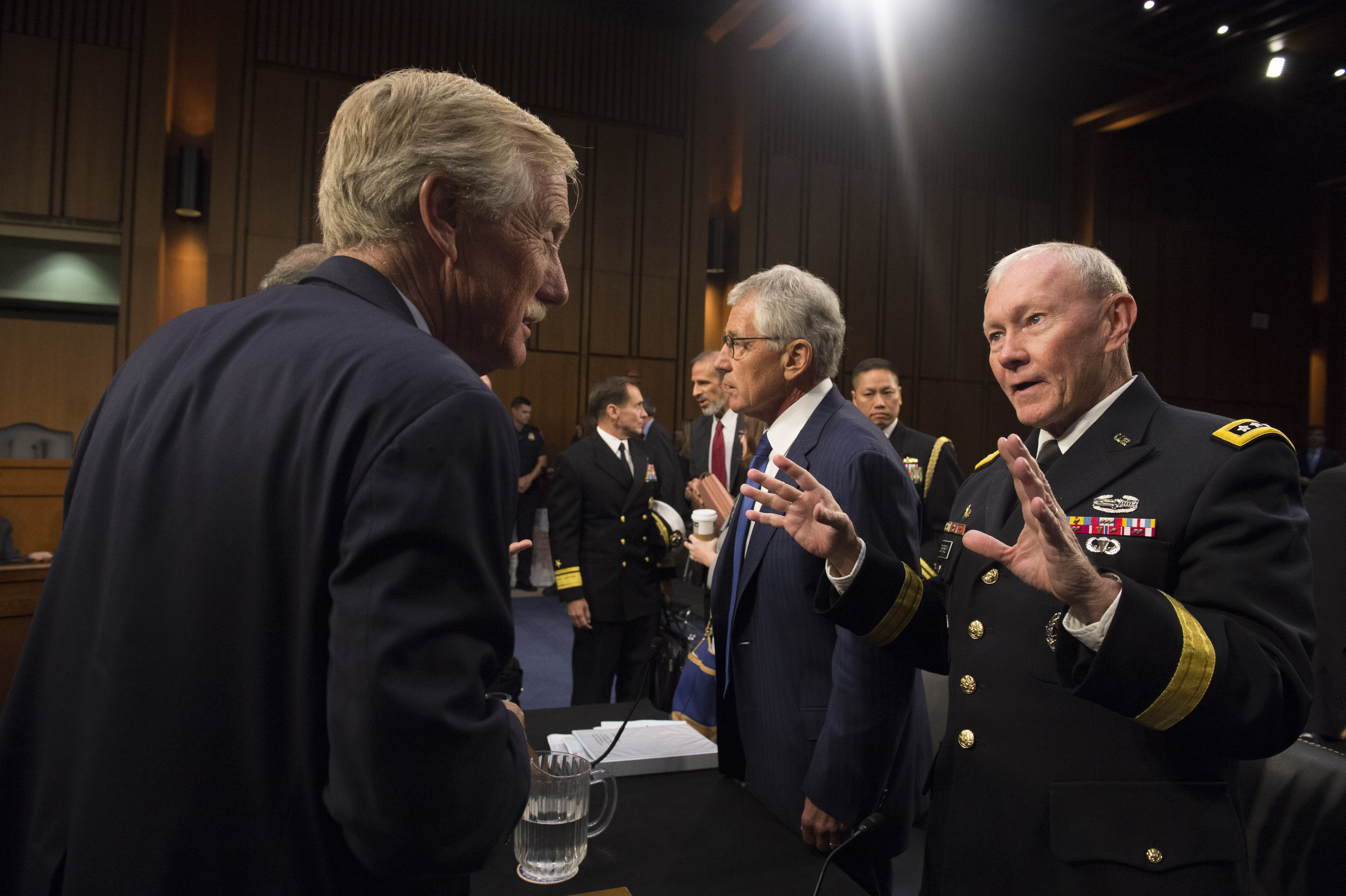
Martin Dempsey (right), speaking with King (left) at Senate Armed Services Committee meeting in 2014.

King endorsed his colleague Susan Collins for reelection in the 2014 U.S. Senate election, calling her a "model Senator". At the same time, he endorsed Democratic Senator Jeanne Shaheen of New Hampshire for reelection. King also endorsed Eliot Cutler for governor in the 2014 election, as he had in 2010, but on October 29, 2014, he switched his endorsement to Democratic nominee Mike Michaud. He also endorsed Democrat Emily Cain for the Maine's second congressional district election and Republican Senator Lamar Alexander of Tennessee in his reelection campaign.

After Republicans gained the Senate majority in the 2014 election, King announced that he would continue to caucus with the Democrats. He cited his belief that it is good for a state to have a senator from each party, and that it is important to have a senator who caucuses with the same party as the President, saying, "In the end, who I caucus with is less important than who I work with." He added, "It does not mean I have become a Democrat. It does not mean I have made a promise to anybody."

==== 116th Congress (2019–2021) ====
In April 2020, President Donald Trump said King was "worse than any Democrat" after King had a "testy" exchange with Vice President Mike Pence in a phone call in which King had criticized the executive branch's response to the COVID-19 pandemic in the United States. King stated he had "never been so mad about a phone call in my entire life," after the phone call with Pence. He also called the President and Vice President's response to the pandemic "a dereliction of duty."

==== 117th Congress (2021–2023) ====
King was participating in the certification of the 2021 United States Electoral College vote count when Trump supporters attacked the United States Capitol. When they breached the Capitol, King and other senators were moved to a safe location. He called the event a "violent insurrection" and "unspeakably sad", and blamed Trump. In the wake of the attack, King announced that he supported invoking the 25th Amendment to remove Trump from office.

==== 118th Congress (2023–2025) ====
In November 2024, King's vote was one of 19 in favor of a bill to block arms sales to Israel during the Gaza war. King, who had skipped an address to Congress by Israeli Prime Minister Benjamin Netanyahu in protest of Israel's conduct of the war in July of that year, said that the war had taken "a dark turn when it resulted in far more casualties among innocent Palestinians—including tens of thousands of women and children—than among Hamas."

==== 119th Congress (2025–2027) ====
In July 2025, King reportedly claimed to have mistakenly voted for Josh Divine to have a lifetime appointment as a federal judge.

=== Committee assignments ===
==== Current ====
- Committee on Armed Services
  - Subcommittee on Airland (2017–present)
  - Subcommittee on Personnel (2013–2017)
  - Subcommittee on Seapower
  - Subcommittee on Strategic Forces (2013–2017; 2019–present) (Chair, 2021–present)
- Committee on Energy and Natural Resources (2015–present)
  - Subcommittee on Energy
  - Subcommittee on National Parks (Chair, 2021–present)
  - Subcommittee on Public Lands, Forests, and Mining (2021–present)
  - Subcommittee on Water and Power (2015–2021)
- Select Committee on Intelligence

==== Previous ====
- Committee on the Budget (2013–2019)

=== Caucus memberships ===
- Afterschool Caucuses
- Congressional Coalition on Adoption
- Congressional Motorcycle Caucus
- Rare Disease Caucus

=== Legislation sponsored ===
The following is an incomplete list of legislation that King has sponsored:

- Affordable College Textbook Act (S. 1864; 115th Congress)
- In April 2023, it was revealed that Justice Clarence Thomas had accepted hundreds of thousands of dollars of travel and free gifts from a Republican donor. King and Senator Lisa Murkowski introduced a bipartisan bill intended to force the Supreme Court to establish an ethics code that would require the court to appoint an official to examine public complaints and potential conflicts.

== Political positions ==
King has been described as a moderate Independent. He has called himself "neither a Democrat nor a Republican, but an American". The nonpartisan National Journal gave him a 2013 composite ideology score of 59% liberal and 41% conservative. His Crowdpac score is −4.3 (10 is the most conservative, −10 the most liberal), based on his campaign contributions, votes, and speeches. According to a study published by The Washington Post called "Party Unity scores", King voted with the Democratic Party 43% of the time. The Conservative Political Action Conference (CPAC) gave him a 6.83% lifetime conservative rating in 2025. GovTrack ranks King among the moderate members of the Senate, near its ideological center. In 2014, King endorsed his Republican colleague from Maine, Susan Collins. According to FiveThirtyEight, which tracks Congressional votes, King had voted in line with President Trump's position on legislation about 38% of the time as of January 2021. In 2023, the Lugar Center ranked King in the top fifth of senators for bipartisanship.

=== Agriculture ===
In August 2018, King was one of 31 senators to vote against the Protect Interstate Commerce Act of 2018, a proposed amendment to the 2018 United States farm bill that would mandate states to authorize agricultural product sales not prohibited under federal law. After the farm bill passed in December, King and Susan Collins released a statement expressing their delight at the amendment not being included as there were a "number of state laws in Maine that would have been undermined if this amendment was adopted, including those on crate bans for livestock, consumer protections for blueberry inspections, and environmental safeguards for cranberry cultivation".

=== Economic policy ===
King has called for the continuation of a tariff on imported athletic footwear, citing the potential loss of jobs at New Balance's Skowhegan and Madison factories in Maine.

In 2017, King opposed the Republican tax bill, criticizing its passage on a party-line vote without hearings, saying: "The Bangor City Council would not amend the leash law using this process." King criticized the legislation for adding $1 trillion to the U.S. budget deficit over ten years and sought to return the bill to committee, but his proposal failed on a party-line vote.

In March 2018, King and fellow Maine senator Susan Collins introduced the Northern Border Regional Commission Reauthorization Act, a bill that would bolster the Northern Border Regional Commission (NBRC) and was included in the 2018 United States farm bill. In June 2019, when King and Collins announced the NBRC would award grant funding to the University of Maine, the senators called the funding an investment in Maine's forest economy that would "help those who have relied on this crucial sector for generations" and "bolster efforts by UMaine to open more opportunities in rural communities."

On April 15, 2020, the Trump administration invited King to join a bipartisan task force on the reopening of the economy amid the ongoing COVID-19 pandemic.

King is supportive of U.S. manufacturers like Auburn Manufacturing, a Maine company he visited in 2022 to promote domestic manufacturing and speak out against Chinese unfair trade practices.

==== Minimum wage and Social Security ====
On March 5, 2021, King voted against Bernie Sanders's amendment to include a $15/hour minimum wage in the American Rescue Plan Act of 2021. As governor, King vetoed a bill that would have raised Maine's minimum wage by 25 cents per hour.

King and a group of Republican senators led by Bill Cassidy proposed a bill that included raising the Social Security retirement age from 67 to 70. Other policy proposals included tweaking the benefits formula to take into account the number of years a person has worked, and expanding the program's ability to invest in private stocks, rather than the current trust fund model.

==== Trade ====
In February 2019, during ongoing trade disputes between the United States and China, King was one of ten senators to sign a bipartisan letter to Homeland Security Kirstjen Nielsen and Energy Secretary Rick Perry asserting that the American government "should consider a ban on the use of Huawei inverters in the United States and work with state and local regulators to raise awareness and mitigate potential threats" and urging them "to work with all federal, state and local regulators, as well as the hundreds of independent power producers and electricity distributors nationwide to ensure our systems are protected."

=== Environment and energy ===
King supports action to combat climate change and carries a laminated graph of increases in carbon dioxide in Earth's atmosphere to respond to climate change denialists. He was the only member of Congress to join a three-day U.S. Coast Guard fact-finding mission to Greenland in 2016, where he witnessed melting ice sheets firsthand and said that the impacts of climate change were "amazing and scary". Nevertheless, in March 2019 King joined Senate Republicans in voting against the Green New Deal.

King opposes oil drilling in the Arctic National Wildlife Refuge on the grounds that the amount of oil is not worth the environmental risk of extracting it. He also believes that new developments in the energy field, such as fracking, should be subject to "all appropriate environmental safeguards to protect the American people and the American land." King opposes the Keystone XL pipeline, saying it "will facilitate the transport of some of the world's dirtiest and most climate-harming oil through our country", and has cast several votes against legislation authorizing its construction. King said he was "frustrated" with President Obama's delay in deciding whether to authorize construction, but that he opposed Congress legislating the approval or disapproval of a construction project.

King has expressed opposition to the creation of a Maine Woods National Park. His 2012 campaign website said that local control is the best way to conserve land, but in 2014, King said he was keeping an open mind about the idea.

King initially expressed "serious reservations" about proposals to establish the Katahdin Woods and Waters National Monument, but expressed support for Obama's creation of the monument in 2016, saying that the administration had made commitments that convinced him that "the benefits of the designation will far outweigh any detriment"; that the monument would not hurt Maine's pulp and paper industry; and that the monument would help diversify the local economy.

King opposes efforts in Maine to ban the baiting and trapping of bears, including an effort to put the question to voters in 2014, calling such practices necessary to prevent interaction between bears and people, and saying the practices are based on science and the views of experts.

In 2017, King and Senator Jim Risch introduced the Securing Energy Infrastructure Act. The Senate Energy and Natural Resources Committee approved the bill in 2018. The bill creates a pilot program for the federal government to study analog, nondigital, and physical systems that can be incorporated into the power grid to mitigate the potential effects of a cyberattack. The idea for the bill came after a 2015 cyberattack in Ukraine took down a large portion of the country's energy grid. In April 2019 King was one of four senators caucusing with the Democrats who voted with Republicans to confirm David Bernhardt, an oil executive, as Secretary of the Interior Department.

In April 2019, King was one of 12 senators to sign a bipartisan letter to top senators on the Appropriations Subcommittee on Energy and Water Development advocating that the Energy Department be granted maximum funding for carbon capture, utilization and storage (CCUS), arguing that American job growth could be stimulated by investment in capturing carbon emissions and expressing disagreement with President Trump's 2020 budget request to combine the two federal programs that do carbon capture research.

In July 2019, King called climate change "one of the most serious threats to" the United States, saying that two thirds of Arctic ice has disappeared over the past 30 years. A release from King's office stated that he had asserted the vital need for the U.S. to return to the aspirations of the Paris Climate Accord.

=== Foreign relations and national security ===
King has voted to arm Syrian rebels who were fighting Syrian President Bashar al-Assad and ISIL militants.

King favors the normalization of U.S.–Cuba relations. He opposes the U.S. embargo against Cuba, calling it an "antiquated" relic of the Cold War; in 2015, King introduced legislation to lift the embargo.

As a member of the Senate Intelligence Committee, King participated in its probe of Russia's interference in the 2016 U.S. elections. King said that the entire committee had "no doubt whatsoever" about the Kremlin's culpability in the meddling and described the cyberattacks as "a frontal assault on our democracy" that could present a long-term threat.

In May 2018, King and fellow Maine senator Susan Collins introduced the PRINT Act, a bill that would halt collections of countervailing duties and anti-dumping duties on Canadian newsprint and require the U.S. Department of Commerce to conduct a study of economic health of printing and publishing industries. Proponents of the bill argued it would offer a lifeline to the publishing industry amid newsprint price increases. Critics accused it of setting "a dangerous precedent for future investigations into allegations of unfair trade practices."

In August 2018, King and 16 other lawmakers urged the Trump administration to impose sanctions under the Global Magnitsky Act against Chinese officials responsible for human rights abuses against the Uyghur Muslim minority in western China's Xinjiang region. They wrote: "The detention of as many as a million or more Uyghurs and other predominantly Muslim ethnic minorities in "political reeducation" centers or camps requires a tough, targeted, and global response."

In November 2018, King joined Senators Chris Coons, Marco Rubio and a bipartisan group of lawmakers in sending the Trump administration a letter raising concerns about the People's Republic of China's undue influence on media outlets and academic institutions in the United States. They wrote: "In American news outlets, Beijing has used financial ties to suppress negative information about the CCP. ... Beijing has also sought to use relationships with American academic institutions and student groups to shape public discourse."

In late 2018, King voted to withdraw U.S. military aid for Saudi Arabia's war in Yemen.

In December 2018, after President Trump announced the withdrawal of American troops from Syria, King was one of six senators to sign a letter expressing concern about the move and their belief "that such action at this time is a premature and costly mistake that not only threatens the safety and security of the United States, but also emboldens ISIS, Bashar al-Assad, Iran, and Russia."

In October 2019, King was one of six senators to sign a bipartisan letter to Trump calling on him to "urge Turkey to end their offensive [in Syria] and find a way to a peaceful resolution while supporting our Kurdish partners to ensure regional stability" and arguing that to leave Syria without installing protections for American allies would endanger both them and the U.S.

King initially rejected calls for a ceasefire in the Gaza war, but as the war progressed, he became increasingly critical of Israel's conduct. He skipped Israeli Prime Minister Benjamin Netanyahu's address to a joint session of Congress in 2024 due to Israel's conduct in the war, and in December 2024 joined 18 other senators mostly from the Democratic Party's progressive wing in voting to block arms sales to Israel due to the number of Palestinian civilians killed in the conflict.

In March 2023, King voted with a bipartisan majority to repeal the Authorization for Use of Military Force (AUMF) in Iraq.

==== Iran ====
In 2015, King supported the Joint Comprehensive Plan of Action, an international agreement with Iran. In voting against a "resolution of disapproval" in opposition to the agreement, King stated, "The current alternatives, if this agreement is rejected, are either unrealistic or downright dangerous."

In May 2019, King said he believed U.S. intel on Iran was accurate but that he wanted to know which country was reacting to the actions of the other, adding that he was "gravely concerned because of the possibility of miscalculation, misunderstanding, misreading of some event and all of the sudden you're on the ladder of escalation that could be dangerous for this country and for the Middle East."

After President Trump halted retaliatory air strikes against Iran after Iran downed an American surveillance drone in June 2019, King said he agreed with the decision not to carry out the strikes but expressed concern about Trump's potentially limited options after steps taken by National Security Advisor John Bolton and Secretary of State Mike Pompeo. King also questioned the difference in U.S. relations with Iran that year as opposed to any other in the country's history and asserted that it was "a high-stakes gamble" if the U.S.'s pressure on Iran was unsuccessful.

=== Gun laws ===
King supports expanding background checks to most firearms transactions, with exceptions for transfers between family members, calling such a position "the single most effective step" that can be taken to keep guns out of the wrong hands. He supports limiting the size of magazines to 10 rounds, and to make purchasing a gun for someone not legally allowed to have one a federal crime. He does not support a ban on assault weapons, believing it will not work and that such a ban is not based on the functionality of the weapons, which are not relevantly different from the many hunting rifles owned by Maine residents. He noted that the vast majority of gun crimes are committed with handguns, not rifles.

King voted for the Manchin–Toomey amendment to expand background checks for gun purchases.

In 2018, King was a cosponsor of the NICS Denial Notification Act, legislation developed in the aftermath of the Stoneman Douglas High School shooting that would require federal authorities to inform states within a day after a person failing the National Instant Criminal Background Check System attempted to buy a firearm.

In August 2019, after two mass shootings in El Paso and Dayton, King cosponsored the Extreme Risk Protection Order Act, a bill authorizing states to use grants to develop red flag laws which would allow family members to petition courts for an order that would temporarily prevent someone from purchasing a gun and an order for law enforcement to take a firearm away.

In 2022, King voted for the Bipartisan Safer Communities Act, a gun reform bill introduced following a deadly school shooting at Robb Elementary School in Uvalde, Texas. The bill enhanced background checks for firearm purchasers under the age of 21, provided funding for school-based mental health services, and partially closed the gun show loophole and boyfriend loophole.

After the 2023 Lewiston shootings, King joined fellow Maine Senator Susan Collins in opposing calls for a national assault weapons ban but supporting bans on functionalities such as high-capacity magazines.

=== Healthcare ===
King supports the Affordable Care Act (ACA or Obamacare), but has expressed support for modest adjustments to the legislation if they can be done on a bipartisan basis. In 2013, he voted to restore funding for the ACA as part of an amendment to legislation that funded government operations for 45 days. He has said that those opposed to the ACA who are attempting to discourage people from purchasing health insurance are "guilty of murder" and that doing so was "one of the grossest violations of our humanity that I could think of." In making this comment, King noted a time in his life when he believed he would have died had he not just acquired health insurance.

In 2015, as part of the Obama administration's fiscal year 2016 budget, the United States Department of Veterans Affairs proposed congressional authorization for $6.8 million toward leasing 56,600 square feet at an unspecified location in Portland, Maine, to expand a clinic that would authorize southern Maine veterans to receive basic medical and mental health care locally. King supported the proposal. He and Susan Collins released a statement that ensuring Maine veterans had access to high quality care "is one of our top priorities, and we're pursuing the input of local veterans and interested stakeholders to understand their perspective about the proposal."

In January 2017, King voted against the Republican Senate budget plan to accelerate repeal of the ACA and block repeal legislation from being filibustered; the measure passed on a largely party line 51–48 vote. He spoke out against the House Republican repeal legislation, noting that the Congressional Budget Office estimated that 14 million Americans would lose health insurance if the legislation were enacted. Of the House Republican bill, King said, "If you were designing a bill to hammer my state, it would be this bill," adding that it would most adversely affect Maine residents between the ages of 50 and 65.

King is a supporter of the Children's Health Insurance Program (CHIP) program.

King favors abortion rights.

In February 2017, King and 30 other senators signed a letter to Kaléo Pharmaceuticals in response to an increase of the opioid-overdose-reversing device Evzio's price from $690 in 2014 to $4,500. They requested the detailed price structure for Evzio, the number of devices Kaléo Pharmaceuticals set aside for donation, and the totality of federal reimbursements Evzio received in the previous year.

King criticized Trump's 2017 budget proposal for its cuts to medical research. In 2018 he voted with all Republicans except Rand Paul and six Democrats to confirm Alex Azar, Trump's nominee for Health Secretary.

In June 2018, King and fellow Maine Senator Susan Collins released a statement endorsing a proposal by FCC Chairman Ajit Pai intended to boost funding for the Rural Health Care Program of the Universal Service Fund, writing that "with demand for RHC funding continuing to rise, any further inaction would risk leaving rural healthcare practitioners without lifesaving telemedicine services. This long-overdue funding increase would be a boon to both healthcare providers and patients in rural communities across our country."

In July 2019, King was one of eight senators to cosponsor the Palliative Care and Hospice Education and Training Act (PCHETA), a bill intended to strengthen training for new and existing physicians, people who teach palliative care, and other providers who are on palliative care teams that grant patients and their families a voice in their care and treatment goals.

In October 2019, King was one of 27 senators to sign a letter to Senate Majority Leader Mitch McConnell and Senate Minority Leader Chuck Schumer advocating the passage of the Community Health Investment, Modernization, and Excellence (CHIME) Act, which was set to expire the following month. The senators warned that if the funding for the Community Health Center Fund (CHCF) was allowed to expire, it "would cause an estimated 2,400 site closures, 47,000 lost jobs, and threaten the health care of approximately 9 million Americans."

King has voted against Republican attempts to completely defund Planned Parenthood, calling the proposals an "unfounded yet relentless assault" and "another example of misguided outrage that would only hurt those who need help the most." No federal funds go to Planned Parenthood for abortions (federal dollars pay for other health care services provided by the group, such as contraception and screenings for cancer and sexually transmitted diseases), but Republicans have sought to completely defund the organization because it provides abortions with other funds. King stated that supporters of the bill were in effect voting to deprive low-income Americans of healthcare over an issue "that has nothing to do with the 97 percent of the services that Planned Parenthood provides," saying: "To me, this bill is like attacking Brazil after Pearl Harbor."

=== Immigration ===
King strongly criticized President Donald Trump's Executive Order 13769, which barred the admission of refugees to the U.S. and barred travel by nationals of several Muslim-majority countries to the country. He said: "This is probably the worst foreign policy decision since the invasion of Iraq. What it's done is played right into ISIS's hands. They want us to turn this into a war of the west against Islam. They have explicitly said they want to drive a wedge ... There are 1.6 billion Muslims in the world and we don't want a war with all of them. We don't need a war with all of them. We're not opposed to all of them." King noted that U.S. forces fought alongside Muslim Iraqi troops, and that Muslim nations shared valuable counterterrorism intelligence with the U.S.

In 2018, King introduced legislation to halt separations of immigrant families at the border.

In June 2019, King and Senator Susan Collins released a joint statement confirming that they had questioned U.S. Customs and Border Protection "on the process being used to clear" asylum seekers for transportation to Portland, Maine, and opined that it was "clearly not a sustainable approach to handling the asylum situation." Collins and King were said to both be "interested in providing additional resources to the federal agencies that process asylum claims, so we can reduce the existing backlog and adjudicate new claims in a more timely fashion."

=== Railroad safety ===
In June 2019, King was one of 10 senators to cosponsor the Safe Freight Act, a bill that would require freight trains have one or more certified conductors and a certified engineer aboard who can collaborate on how to protect both the train and people living near the tracks. The legislation was meant to correct a Federal Railroad Administration rollback of a proposed rule intended to establish safety standards.

=== Same-sex marriage ===
King supports same-sex marriage. He signed an amicus brief to the U.S. Supreme Court in United States v. Windsor encouraging it to strike down the Defense of Marriage Act. Additionally, King voted for the Respect for Marriage Act in 2022.

=== Telecommunications and social media ===
In April 2019, King was one of seven senators to sponsor the Digital Equity Act of 2019, legislation establishing a $120 million grant program that would fund both the creation and implementation of "comprehensive digital equity plans" in each U.S. state to support projects developed by individuals and groups. The bill also gave the National Telecommunications and Information Administration (NTIA) the role of evaluating and providing guidance for digital equity projects.

In January 2025, King co-sponsored the Kids Off Social Media Act (KOSMA), which was introduced by Senators Brian Schatz, Chris Murphy, Ted Cruz, and Katie Britt. Senators John Curtis, Peter Welch, John Fetterman, Ted Budd, and Mark Warner also co-sponsored the Act, which would set a minimum age of 13 to use social media platforms and prevent social media companies from feeding "algorithmically targeted" content to users under 17.

=== United States Postal Service ===
In March 2019, King was a cosponsor of a bipartisan resolution led by Gary Peters and Jerry Moran that opposed privatization of the United States Postal Service (USPS), citing the USPS as a self-sustained establishment and noting concerns that privatization could cause higher prices and reduced services for its customers, especially in rural communities.

=== Lobster emoji ===
King successfully advocated for the creation and implementation of the lobster emoji.

King officially advocated for the creation and implementation of the lobster emoji as a symbol of Maine culture. In September 2017, he wrote a petition to the Unicode Consortium, providing Google search data to argue that there was a need for a lobster emoji. The lobster emoji was implemented in February 2018, which King called "great news for Maine".

== Personal life ==
King's first wife was Edie Hazard Birney, a granddaughter of Rowland Hazard III. She is the mother of his three elder sons. King and Birney divorced in 1982. Since 1984, King has been married to Mary Herman. He has five children and six grandchildren. One of his children, Angus III, was a candidate in the 2026 Maine gubernatorial election Democratic primary, placing last. King is an Episcopalian and attends St. Paul's Episcopal Church in Brunswick. He rides a Harley-Davidson motorcycle. According to OpenSecrets.org, King's net worth was more than $9.4 million as of 2018.

=== Health issues ===
In June 2015, King underwent a successful surgery that removed a cancerous prostate that had been detected in a screening and biopsy. The surgery did not change his plan to run for reelection in 2018. On August 19, 2021, King and Senators Roger Wicker and John Hickenlooper tested positive for COVID-19. He fully recovered from the virus, saying, "I didn't feel great during the worst of my illness, but I'm confident that I would have felt a whole lot worse if I hadn't received the vaccine".

== Electoral history ==
1994 Maine gubernatorial election
| Party | Candidate | Votes | % | ±% |
|---|---|---|---|---|
| Independent | Angus King | 180,829 | 35.37% | N/A |
| Democratic | Joseph Brennan | 172,951 | 33.83% | −12.87% |
| Republican | Susan Collins | 117,990 | 23.08% | −23.62% |
| Green | Jonathan Carter | 32,695 | 6.39% | N/A |
| Write-In | Ed Finks | 6,576 | 1.29% | N/A |
| | Write-ins | 267 | 0.05% | N/A |
| Turnout | | 511,308 | ~55% | |
| Independent gain from Republican | | Swing | | |

1998 Maine gubernatorial election
| Party | Candidate | Votes | % | ±% |
|---|---|---|---|---|
| Independent | Angus King (Incumbent) | 246,772 | 58.61% | +23.25% |
| Republican | James B. Longley, Jr. | 79,716 | 18.93% | −4.14% |
| Democratic | Thomas J. Connolly | 50,506 | 12.00% | −21.83% |
| Green | Pat LaMarche | 28,722 | 6.82% | +0.43% |
| Constitution | William P. Clarke, Jr. | 15,293 | 3.63% | N/A |
| Turnout | | 421,009 | | |
| Independent hold | | Swing | | |

2012 United States Senate election in Maine
| Party | Candidate | Votes | % | ±% |
|---|---|---|---|---|
| Independent | Angus King | 370,580 | 52.89% | N/A |
| Republican | Charlie Summers | 215,399 | 30.75% | −43.26% |
| Democratic | Cynthia Dill | 92,900 | 13.26% | −7.33% |
| Independent | Steve Woods | 10,289 | 1.47% | N/A |
| Independent | Danny Dalton | 5,807 | 0.83% | N/A |
| Libertarian | Andrew Ian Dodge | 5,624 | 0.80% | N/A |
| Turnout | | 700,599 | | |
| Independent gain from Republican | | | | |

2018 United States Senate election in Maine
| Party | Candidate | Votes | % | ±% |
|---|---|---|---|---|
| Independent | Angus King (incumbent) | 344,575 | 54.31% | +1.42% |
| Republican | Eric Brakey | 223,502 | 35.23% | +4.48% |
| Democratic | Zak Ringelstein | 66,268 | 10.45% | −2.81% |
| Turnout | | 634,345 | | |
| Independent hold | | | | |

2024 United States Senate election in Maine
| Party | Candidate | Votes | % | ±% |
|---|---|---|---|---|
| Independent | Angus King (incumbent) | 427,331 | 52.06% | −2.25 |
| Republican | Demi Kouzounas | 284,338 | 34.64% | −0.59 |
| Democratic | David Costello | 88,891 | 10.83% | +0.38 |
| Independent | Jason Cherry | 20,222 | 2.46% | N/A |
| Total votes | | 820,782 | 100.00% | N/A |
| Independent hold | | | | |

== Awards, honors, and fellowships ==
=== Scholastic ===
University degrees

| Location | Date | School | Degree |
|---|---|---|---|
| New Hampshire | 1966 | Dartmouth College | Bachelor of Arts (BA) |
| Virginia | 1969 | University of Virginia School of Law | Juris Doctor (JD) |

Chancellor, visitor, governor, rector and fellowships

| Location | Date | School | Position |
|---|---|---|---|
| Maine | 2004–present | Bowdoin College | Distinguished Lecturer |
| Massachusetts | Fall 2004 – present | Institute of Politics at Harvard University | Fellow |

=== Honorary degrees ===
| Location | Date | School | Degree | Gave commencement address |
|---|---|---|---|---|
| Maine | 2007 | Bowdoin College | Doctor of Laws (LL.D) | |
| Maine | May 8, 2016 | Husson University | Doctor of Science (D.Sc.) | Yes |
| Maine | May 12, 2018 | University of Maine at Presque Isle | Doctor of Humane Letters (DHL) | Yes |

=== Memberships and fellowships ===
| Location | Date | Organization | Position |
|---|---|---|---|
| Maine | 1969–present | Maine State Bar Association | Member |

=== Non-academic awards ===
In 2024, King received the 24th Bruce F. Vento Public Service Award from the National Park Trust.

Political offices
| Preceded by John McKernan | Governor of Maine; 1995–2003 | Succeeded by John Baldacci |
U.S. Senate
| Preceded by Olympia Snowe | U.S. Senator (Class 1) from Maine; 2013–present Served alongside: Susan Collins, Troy Jackson (elect) | Incumbent |
U.S. order of precedence (ceremonial)
| Preceded by Tim Kaine | Order of precedence of the United States | Succeeded by Ted Cruz |
| Preceded by Martin Heinrich | United States senators by seniority 39th | Succeeded by Tim Kaine |
