= Auburn Manufacturing =

U.S. company

Auburn Manufacturing Inc. is a U.S. company based in Mechanic Falls, Maine. The company produces heat- and fire-resistant fabrics for industrial use, supplying the United States Navy and other customers. Auburn Manufacturing services industries such as glassmaking, mining, and shipbuilding, using domestic-made materials, with over 500 heavy industry businesses as customers.

Founded in 1979 (46 years ago), Auburn Manufacturing is known for its disputes with Chinese competitors over unfair trade practices. The company manufactures amorphous silica fabric and other products, which it sells to at least 30 countries. In 2022, Auburn Manufacturing experienced double-digit growth, citing "strong global demand." In 2023, the company ramped up production and hiring due to demand from defense and industrial customers. Auburn Manufacturing grew to 62 employees as of February 2025, investing heavily to serve U.S. defense contractors and the aerospace industry.

In July 2023, President Joe Biden visited Auburn Manufacturing, praising the company for weathering “decades of economic storms.” Lauding Auburn Manufacturing’s record, Biden noted that 2023 has been the company’s best year to date. Kathie Leonard, owner of Auburn Manufacturing, claimed, “[Biden's] focus on domestic manufacturing has increased demand for products like ours.” CNN subsequently highlighted Auburn Manufacturing as an example of America's "factory boom." Celebrating the growth of blue-collar work during his visit, Biden pointed to rising investments in construction projects by Auburn Manufacturing and other companies.

== Leadership ==
Auburn Manufacturing is owned by Leonard, who serves as president and CEO. Leonard founded the company at the age of 27, growing it into a business with two locations and about 60 employees. She was named the 2018 Mainebiz Business Leader of the Year.

Before Auburn Manufacturing, Leonard began her career at a Lewiston, Maine mill that produced an industrial fabric to replace asbestos. She is an advocate for female entrepreneurship, saying that it creates “ladders for women.” According to the Lewiston Sun Journal, “With Leonard at the helm, AMI has become an internationally recognized source for the highest-grade materials.” Leonard believes the company is well-equipped to weather recessions, saying that, "We've been through ups and downs."

In March 2025, Leonard spoke at the South by Southwest Festival and Conference in Austin, Texas, discussing U.S. manufacturing, the company’s journey to “Industry 4.0,” and “factories of the future.”

Kris Profenno serves as Auburn Manufacturing's shipping and logistics coordinator, working with Roger Millett to ensure product deliveries are intact and on time.

== Legal disputes with China ==
Auburn Manufacturing is critical of “China’s cheating” when it comes to trade, and the company has secured two legal victories against Chinese competitors. The first victory came in 2017, after Leonard took on China in a trade lawsuit that found silica products to be subsidized by the Chinese government and “dumped” into the U.S. market. The second victory came in 2023, when the U.S. Department of Commerce determined that Chinese dumping negatively affects Auburn Manufacturing and other U.S.-based manufacturers.

Because of Auburn Manufacturing's legal disputes with China, the company works closely with federal lawmakers. In addition to Biden in 2023, Sen. Angus King (I-ME) visited one of the company's plants in 2022. Auburn Manufacturing also hosted former Rep. Bruce Poliquin (R-ME) in 2016.

Asked in March 2025 about how tariffs might affect AMI’s business, Leonard said, “Our worry is the retaliatory tariffs that may make our exports too expensive for our many customers in Canada and Mexico.”
