= East Livermore, Maine =

Unincorporated village Livermore Falls, Maine, United States

- Village
- Location within Maine
- Coordinates: 44°24′47″N 70°08′38″W
- Country: United States
- State: Maine
- County: Androscoggin
- Elevation: 335 ft (102 m)
- Time zone: UTC-5 (Eastern (EST))
  - Summer (DST): UTC-4 (EDT)
- ZIP code: 04228
- Area code: 207
- GNIS feature ID: 579274

East Livermore is an unincorporated village in the town of Livermore Falls, Androscoggin County, Maine, United States. It is included both the Lewiston-Auburn, Maine Metropolitan Statistical Area and the Lewiston-Auburn, Maine Metropolitan New England City and Town Area. The community is located along Maine State Route 133 and the Androscoggin River, 22 miles (35 km) north of Lewiston. East Livermore has a post office with ZIP code 04228.
