= Bowman Field (Maine) =

Private airport near Livermore Falls, Maine, USA

- IATA: none; ICAO: none; FAA LID: B10

Summary
- Airport type: Public
- Owner: Bowman Flying Club Inc.
- Serves: Livermore Falls, Maine
- Elevation AMSL: 327 ft (100 m)
- Coordinates: 44°24′36″N 070°08′46″W
- Interactive map of Bowman Field

Runways
| Direction | Length | | Surface |
| Direction | ft | m | Surface |
|---|---|---|---|
| 2/20 | 2,201 | 671 | Turf |

Statistics (2010)
- Aircraft operations: 2,500
- Based aircraft: 15
- Source: Federal Aviation Administration

Bowman Field (FAA LID: B10) is a privately owned public-use airport located four nautical miles (4.6 mi; 7.4 km) southeast of the central business district of Livermore Falls, a town in Androscoggin County, Maine, United States.

== Facilities and aircraft ==
Bowman Field covers an area of 20 acres (8.1 ha) at an elevation of 327 feet (100 m) above mean sea level. It has one runway designated 2/20 with a turf surface measuring 2,201 by 120 feet (671 by 37 m).

For the 12-month period ending August 17, 2010, the airport had 2,500 general aviation aircraft operations, an average of 208 per month. At that time there were 15 aircraft based at this airport: 73% single-engine and 27% ultralight.

== See also ==
- List of airports in Maine
