= Maine Learning Technology Initiative =

The Maine Learning Technology Initiative (MLTI) is an initiative that gives learning technology to all of the 7th-12th graders attending public schools in Maine, Hawaii, and Vermont. Currently, it hands out a school's choice between either iPads, MacBook Airs, Hewlett-Packard ElitePads, Hewlett-Packard ProBooks, and CTL Classmate PC Netbooks to students. Before that, it gave iBooks and later MacBooks to students. When it began in Maine in 2002, it was one of the first such initiatives anywhere in the world and first in the United States to equip all students with a laptop.

== History ==
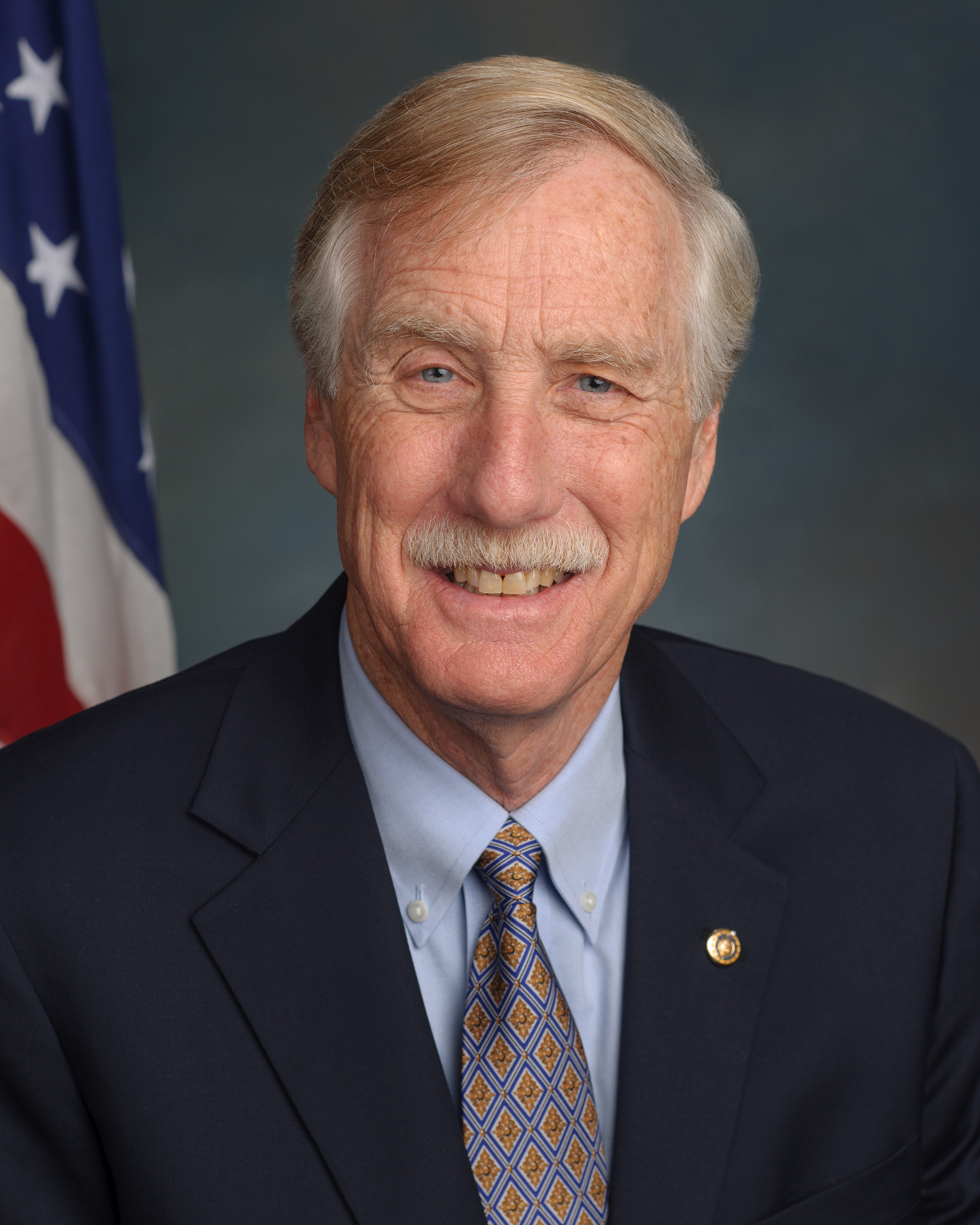
Former Maine governor Angus King, who first proposed the Maine Learning Technology Initiative.

In 2000, Governor Angus King proposed The Maine Learning Technology Initiative, to provide laptops for every middle school student and teacher in the state. One of his primary reasons was a $71 million budget surplus in 1999. He "immediately called for a large portion of this surprise windfall to be put into an endowment for ‘the procurement of portable, wireless computer devices for students.’" After the initial public reaction to the plan it became clear that more discussion and examination of this concept was needed and thus in the summer of 2000 the Legislature and Governor King convened a Joint Task Force on the Maine Learning Technology Endowment which had the task to look in-depth at the issues around this proposal and recommend the best course for Maine to follow. In a Wired Magazine interview, Governor King said, "'I think we're going to demonstrate the power of one-to-one computer access that's going to transform education...the economic future will belong to the technologically adept.'"

John Waters explains that the keys to the success of MLTI are the professional development accompanying the implementation of the program, the strategic vendor relationship with Apple, and quality local leadership.

In early 2001 the Task Force issued its report with the recommendation that Maine pursue a plan to deploy learning technology to all of Maine's students and teachers in 7th and 8th grade and then to look at continuing the program to other grade levels. The Task Force report also included several guiding principles which have been embedded into the work of MLTI. During that spring legislation was authorized to begin the program for the school year beginning in September, 2002.

Apple has been responsible for all of MLTI-provided computers until 2013. Since then, 92.1% of MLTI computers were provided by Apple.

In late September 2001, the Department of Education issued the RFP for MLTI and after scoring all of the proposals selected Apple Computer, Inc. as the award winner. In late December 2001 the Department and Apple formally began to implement the Maine Learning Technology Initiative.

According to Garthwait and Weller, "By fall of 2002, more than 17,000 seventh grade students and their teachers had laptops during school." By the beginning of the 2003–2004 school year, another 17,000 laptops were introduced to the new seventh graders.

From the start, MLTI included professional development for teachers and principals. According to Geoffrey Fletcher,

The program brings Maine's principals together twice a year for either a half day or a full day, in clusters based on the counties they work in. During the sessions, staff from Apple, the supplier for the 1-to-1 program, demonstrate new applications that have been or will be installed on the computers, MLTI staff help with administrative and logistical issues, and members of both staffs discuss different ways these applications can be used with students.

When the program was conceived, the MLTI team decided that school districts would decide whether or not the students could take the iBooks home at the end of the school day. As of January 2004, "more than half the school districts in Maine allow the students to take the iBooks home."

One of the initial motivators for the MLTI was for students in Maine to be technologically literate. At the time of the initiative, Susan Gendron was the Commissioner of Education for the state of Maine. When asked about the rationale behind the technology initiative, Gendron said "we wanted our students to be among the most tech savvy in the country. But by ‘tech savvy’ we meant their ability to use computer tools for innovation, creation and problem solving, not their ability to defrag a hard drive or rip a CD". Governor King stressed that the program was about "learning, not about technology". King was searching for initiatives that would lead to a dramatic improvement in education. He met with Seymour Papert, an educational technology guru to discuss an increase in student to computer ratios as a means of improving education and the future workforce. Papert is also currently one of the principals for the One Laptop Per Child initiative, which is a Miami-based initiative aiming to create affordable educational devices in the developing world. Papert's advice was to create a 1-1 ratio of students to computers to maximize technological potential, and the budget surplus provided an avenue to attain that ratio. King also stressed that these computers would address the "Digital Divide"—the divide between those with access to transformational informational technology and those without. The Initiative was proposed as an "equity tool" aimed to service Maine's diverse demographics—both geographically and socioeconomically.

The Initiative chose to focus their efforts on 7th to 8th graders because middle school students represented a perfect balance of maturity to take care of the equipment and a youthful curiosity toward school. These students still had malleable attitudes toward learning that could be positively altered. Susan Gendron went with Apple, Inc. because they wanted a vendor that could help their students and teachers inside and outside of the classroom. Specifically, Gendron was looking to make sure that students and teachers "have the necessary tools for innovation and creativity". Apple offered a competitive price and became Maine's top choice to supply the laptops for the Initiative. Within their contract, Apple agreed to provide Maine's schools with educational software, professional development, technical support, repair and replacement services. Professional development sessions led by Apple staff are scheduled to keep principals and teachers updated on new educational software that is installed on the school computers, and to make sure the staff knows how to use these programs with their students.

In 2013, Governor Paul LePage identified a need to include a Windows-based teaching solution for schools throughout Maine, as he recognized that "[i]t is important that [Maine's] students are using technology that they will see and use in the workplace”. Gov. LePage identified Hewlett Packard's ProBook 4400 running Windows 8 as an affordable solution to ensure students are obtaining technology skills demanded by the modern workplace. HP's bid for the MLTI project was seen by LePage as "the lowest-priced proposal, and the laptops use an operating system that is commonly used in the workplace in Maine. These laptops will provide students with the opportunity to enhance their learning and give them experience on the same technology and software they will see in their future careers.”

To support their 1-1 Model, Maine chose to reference free educational tools such as the Open Educational Resources Commons project, which provides free reusable academic programs. The Open Educational Resources Commons Project provides resources such as classroom management help, career and technical educational resources, and many other free and easy to use teaching and learning content from around the world.

Another goal of the Initiative was to increase the relevancy problem in schools. Computers give students an immediate answer to the question of "When will we ever have to use this?" and provide multiple learning modalities for diverse learners.

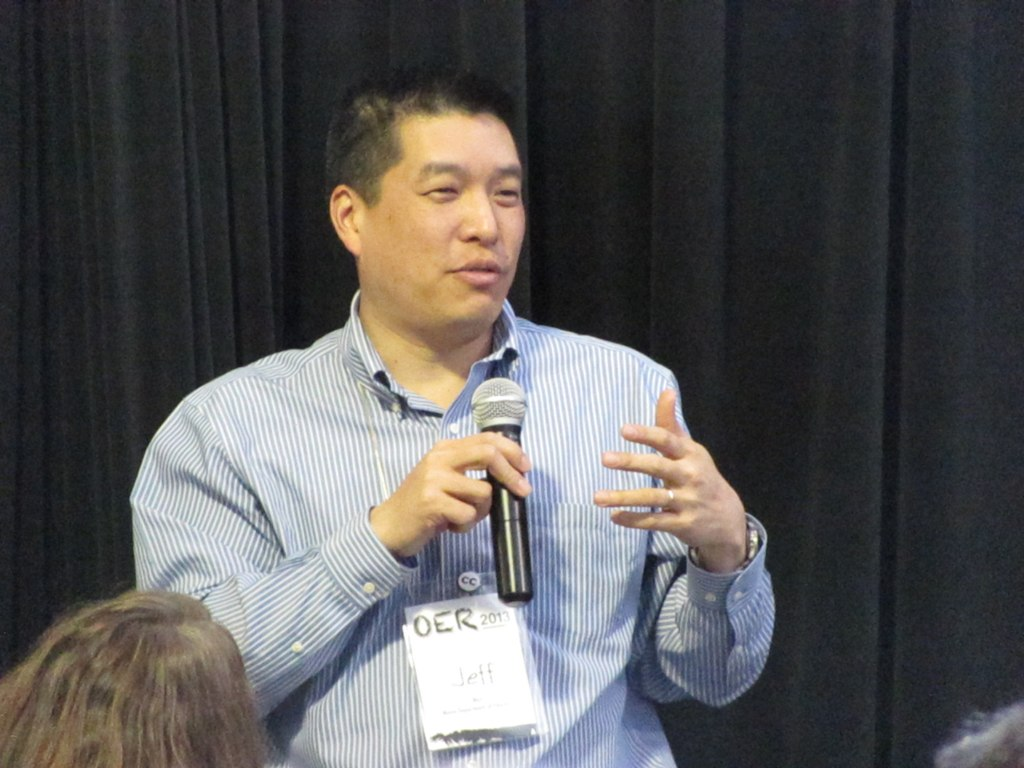
Jeff Mao in 2013

In 2009, it was announced that the MLTI program would expand into the state's high schools. That year, Maine launched the first phase of a rollout to its high schools, in which half the high schools in the state participated. Though it took six years to expand the program to high schools, it was an important part of the original vision of the program. According to Maine's learning technology policy director Jeff Mao, "’We've always imagined this as a 7-12 program.’"

One major change in the high school version of the program is that high schools will have to pay for many of the costs associated with the program. While middle schools get money for "software, hardware, network infrastructure, warranties, technical support, professional development, and data-backup services," high schools only get money for installing wireless networks into their schools. As a result, only 50% of the high schools in the state of Maine chose to participate in the rollout for the 2009–2010 school year.

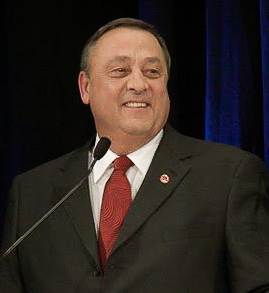
Governor Paul LePage.

In 2013, Governor Paul LePage considered eliminating the MLTI, being unconvinced it was needed to grow distance learning programs in schools, and due to concerns that students were too reliant on technology. His Education Commissioner, Stephen Bowen, convinced him to maintain the program by pointing out that bulk purchases of computers saved taxpayer money, and that technology was as essential as electricity and heat. LePage also switched the computers in the program to Windows operating system-based computers, on the belief that most employers in Maine use such a system. While the state choose a Windows platform, choice was also allowed. Districts could choose from any of the five solutions, with the state paying for anything up to the price of its choice.

As a result, over 90 percent of districts in Maine chose to remain with Apple with 60 percent choosing Apple's Primary Solution which provides Apple iPads to students and MacBook Airs and iPad Minis to teachers. The remaining districts that chose Apple received MacBook Airs for both staff and students. Less than 10 percent chose the HP Windows solution.

== Criticism ==
Due to the one-size-fits-all approach, the program has created a large financial burden for many rural areas of the state. For example, the Maine School Administrative District #39, which oversees schools in the low mountains of western Maine, has had many problems with the introduction of Apple iBooks into schools. Schools in the district, including Buckfield Junior/Senior High School, had previously used PCs with a network that was "hard to integrate with Apple products without buying expensive products the district cannot afford." Another expense that the district incurred as a result of the program was the cost of hiring a new technician to solve problems outside of the repair warranty of the computers. Finally, the district does not allow students to take the laptops home after school due to the extra costs involved, including the cost of buying additional power adapters for all students and the cost of maintenance for breakage that occurs at the students’ homes.

The hardest part of the initiative for these rural districts was the fact that they were forced to integrate Apple products into formerly Windows-centered buildings. However, "as John Sculley told The Guardian newspaper in 1997: 'People talk about technology, but Apple was a marketing company. It was the marketing company of the decade.'" As a result of their marketing, persistence, and strategic relationship with the state of Maine on the initiative, Apple won the proposal and entered many schools statewide.
