= Bourg–Ceyzériat Airport =

Bourg–Ceyzériat Airport Aéroport de Bourg–Ceyzériat
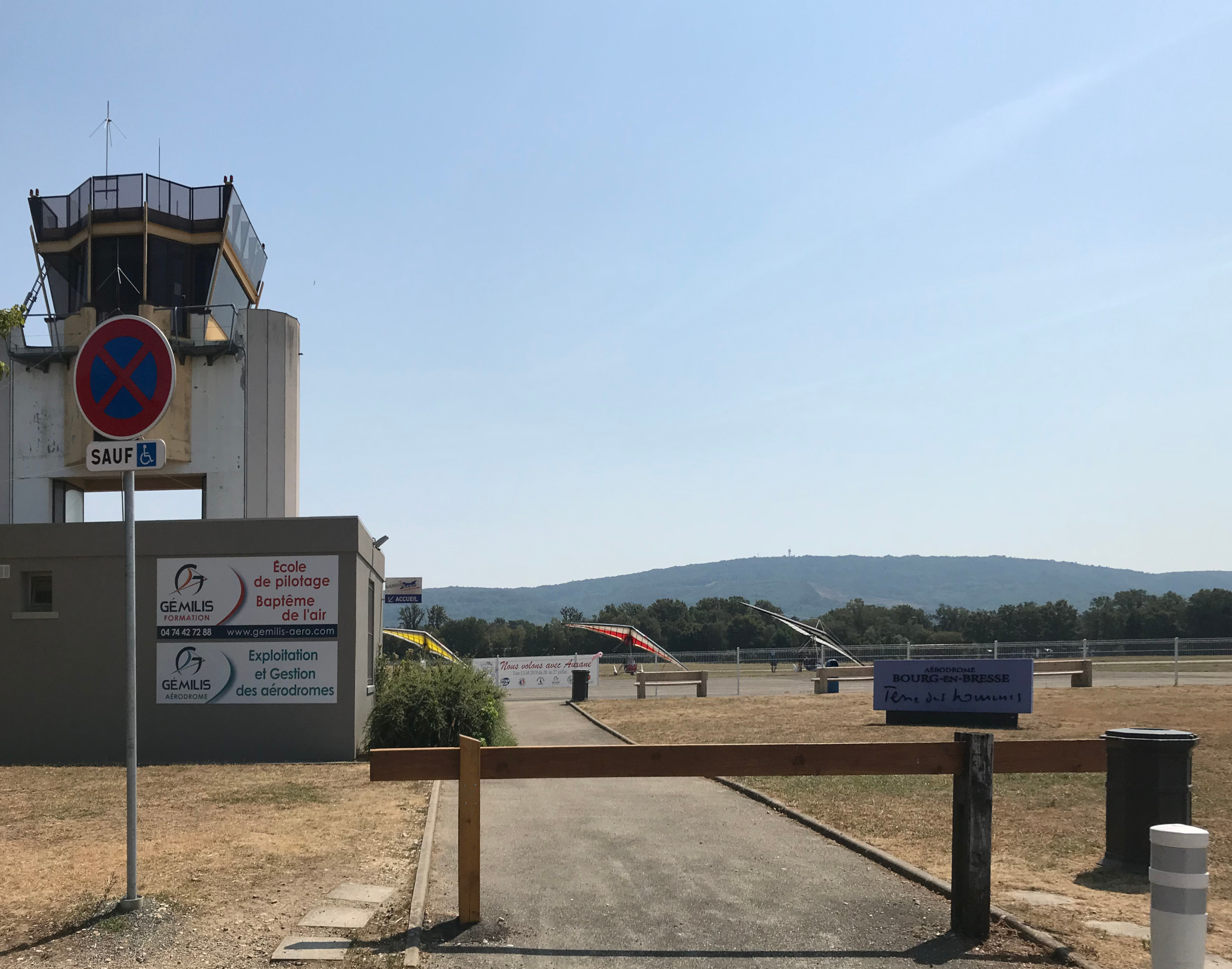
- IATA: none; ICAO: LFHS

Summary
- Airport type: Public
- Serves: Bourg-en-Bresse, France
- Location: Ceyzériat, France
- Elevation AMSL: 857 ft / 261 m
- Coordinates: 46°12′20″N 005°17′30″E

Map
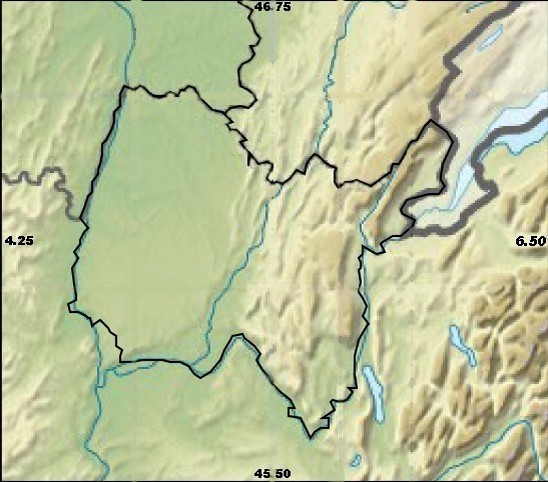
- Location of airport in Ain department Location of Ain department in France

Runways
Direction	Length		Surface
Direction	m	ft	Surface
18/36	1,139	3,737	Asphalt
18R/36L	735	2,411	Grass
- Source: AIP France

Bourg–Ceyzériat Airport (French: Aéroport de Bourg–Ceyzériat) (ICAO: LFHS) is an airport located 5 km (3 NM) east of Bourg-en-Bresse and northwest of Ceyzériat, both communes of the Ain department in the Rhône-Alpes region of France.

== Facilities ==
The airport is at an elevation of 857 feet (261 m) above mean sea level. It has one asphalt paved runway designated 18/36 measuring 1,139 by 30 metres (3,737 ft × 98 ft) and a parallel grass runway measuring 735 by 80 metres (2,411 ft × 262 ft).

The airport is open 24 hours and offers Pilot Controlled Lighting for Night VFR flights.

It is walking distance from Bourg-en-Bresse Jasseron motorway station which offers a restaurant and hotel.

== Airlines and destinations ==
There is no scheduled commercial air service at this time.
