= Mississippi Historical Society =

Historical society

- Formation: 1858
- Type: Historical society
- Location: Jackson, Mississippi, U.S.
- Website: https://www.mississippihistory.org/

The Mississippi Historical Society (MHS) is a historical society located in the U.S. state of Mississippi. The society was established in 1858 but was terminated soon after because of the outbreak of the American Civil War. It remained in hiatus until 1890, after which it published extensively over the next 35 years and helped establish the Mississippi Department of Archives and History in 1902. After a second protracted hiatus from 1925 until 1952, the society re-emerged and has remained in continuous operation ever since.

The society publishes the Journal of Mississippi History, the online publication Mississippi History Now which contains more than 150 essays about topics in Mississippi history, and Heritage of Mississippi Series which is a collection of the history of Mississippi in a 15 volume set of books.

== History ==
=== Establishment ===
The Mississippi Historical Society (MHS) was founded in Jackson on November 9, 1858 by Benjamin L.C. Wailes. The initial incarnation of the society was short-lived, expiring after only two years owing to the outbreak of the American Civil War.

=== Second incarnation ===
After a thirty-year hiatus, MHS was restarted in 1890 on the University of Mississippi campus in Oxford. On the campus, the society had closed meetings and it suffered from lack of resources for years until history professor Franklin Lafayette Riley Jr., with counsel from his academic mentor, Herbert Baxter Adams and other state educators, made efforts to revive the Mississippi Historical Society. Riley's attempt to restore MHS began in 1897 as a response to the failing attempt being made at the time where MHS only had nine members. The creation of the Proceedings of the Mississippi Historical Society was a result of Riley's campaign to up membership and incentivize due-paying members to stay. Riley published historical research books through MHS and some of those works contained contributions from Civil War veterans like Confederate general Stephen D. Lee.

Beginning in 1898, the rejuvenated MHS began a series of 14 annual volumes entitled Publications of the Mississippi Historical Society, containing significant scholarship on the history of the state. This was continued in 1916 with the publication of a new series of five additional volumes under the editorship of historian Dunbar Rowland.

The society contributed to the creation of The Mississippi Department of Archives and History in 1902. The two organizations worked in close cooperation until MHS fell dormant once again in 1925. The Mississippi Department of Archives and History produced the scholarly publication The Journal of Mississippi History, in 1939 with the cooperation of MHS.

=== Society today ===
The Mississippi Historical Society was relaunched for a third time in 1952 and has maintained itself in continuous operation ever since. For a brief year between 1952 and 1953 MHS was active, falling once more into dormancy until its most successful upstart in 1964 with the production of J. F. H. Claiborne’s book "Mississippi as a Province, Territory, and State". The society publishes the quarterly Journal of Mississippi History, the monthly Mississippi History Newsletter, and the online journal History Now. In 1973, MHS worked in conjunction with MDAH, the University of Mississippi, Mississippi State University, the University of Southern Mississippi, and the University and College Press of Mississippi to produce the two-volume set "A History of Mississippi," edited by R. A. McLemore which was the most recent comprehensive history of Mississippi published since the 1920's. In 1987, MHS sponsored the creation of Mississippi: An Illustrated History by Edward Akin.

In 1997, MHS announced the upcoming book series, published jointly with MDAH and the University Press of Mississippi and through funding by the Phil Hardin Foundation, The Heritage of Mississippi Series to celebrate Mississippi’s bicentennial. The goal of this series is to publish fifteen books covering the heritage of Mississippi in sections and eras relevant to the history of the state for the purpose of educating readers on the history and culture of Mississippi. So far eight of the fifteen have been produced.

In 2007, Mississippi State University history professor emeritus John F. Marszalek served as president of the Mississippi Historical Society. He is renowned for his original and creative work on the history of the Civil War and Reconstruction. His ascendancy to the presidency of the society is notable considering that he is one of the few northern-born members to serve in that position. During the early 2000s, the MHS repeatedly honored historians for their work on Mississippi history, notably Charles C. Bolton—Department Chair at the University of North Carolina at Greensboro and author of the highly critical 2005 book The Hardest Deal of All: The Battle Over School Integration in Mississippi, 1870-1980.

In addition, in 2007 the MHS invited Bolton and James W. Loewen, author of The Mississippi Chinese: Between Black and White, to speak at the annual meeting. Loewen is notable for filing a federal lawsuit against the state of Mississippi in 1975 over the state's rejection of his textbook, Mississippi: Conflict & Change, co-authored by historian Charles Sallis, from use in the state's public schools.

=== Annual Awards ===
MHS presents writing awards to those with especially notable master's thesis and dissertations biennially. Each year awards for the "Lifetime Achievement for Contributions to Mississippi," "Teacher of the Year" (for a secondary school socials studies teacher in Mississippi), "Outstanding Local Historical Society Award," and Merit Awards for the presentation and promotion of history are all allotted by the Mississippi Historical Society.

== See also ==
- List of historical societies in Mississippi
