= Chris Columbus's unrealized projects =

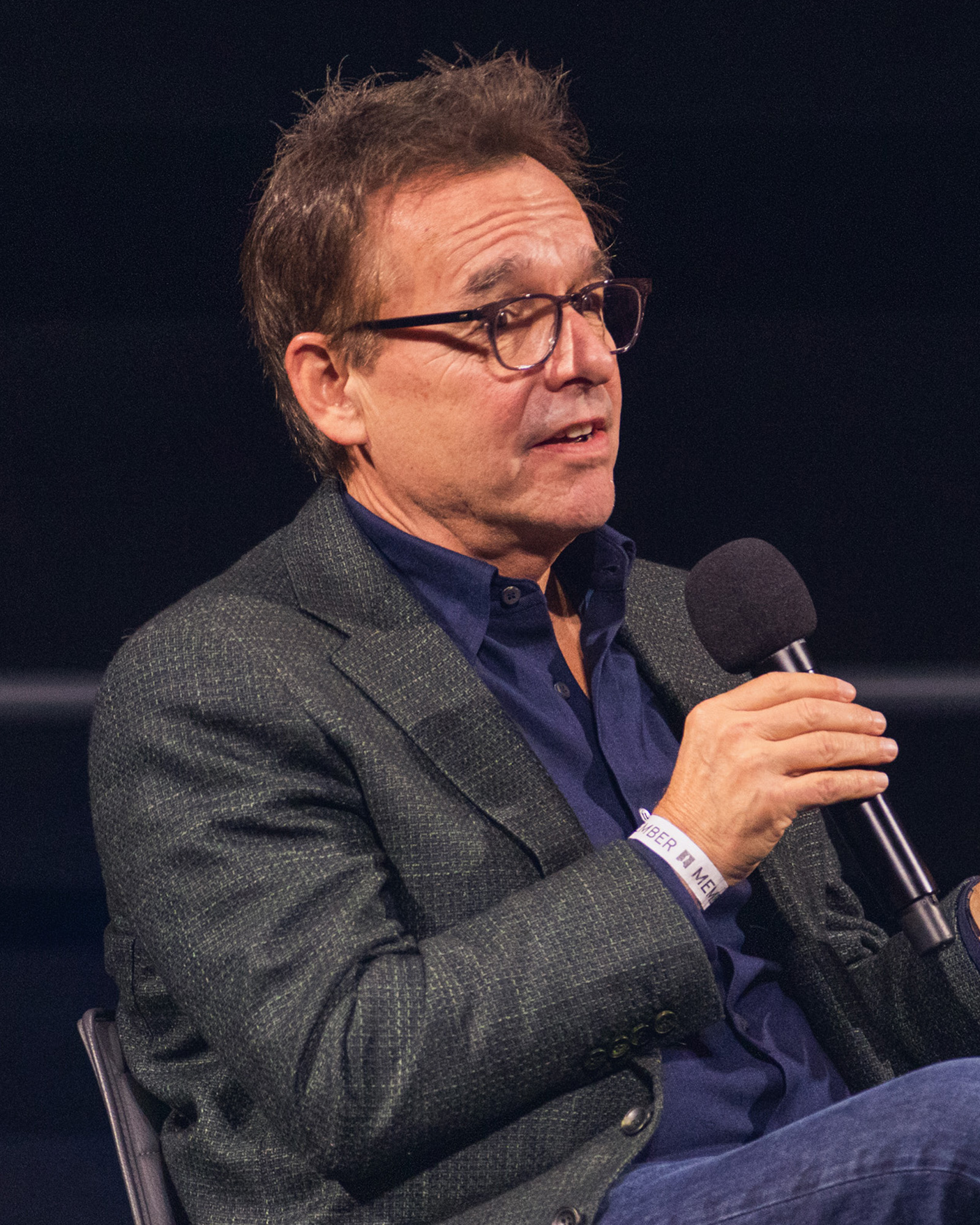
Columbus in 2025

During his long career, American film director Chris Columbus has worked on a number of projects which never progressed beyond the pre-production stage under his direction. Some of these projects, are officially scrapped or linger in "development hell".

== 1980s ==
=== Indiana Jones and the Monkey King ===
In 1985, Columbus wrote a script for a third Indiana Jones film entitled Indiana Jones and the Monkey King. Columbus' script included Indy taking a trip with his assistant Betsy to a secret city protected by soldier gorillas and governed by the evil Monkey King. According to Columbus, the script was written so that the story didn't appear too similar to the previous film Indiana Jones and the Temple of Doom. However, at the end, Columbus' script was rejected and the film was finally released in 1989 under the title Indiana Jones and the Last Crusade and directed by Steven Spielberg. In 2017, Columbus' script was adapted into a five-part live reading/audio drama on the Alcohollywood podcast.

=== National Lampoon's Christmas Vacation ===
Columbus was originally going to direct National Lampoon's Christmas Vacation, but turned it down because of Chevy Chase's behavior. Columbus would later go on to direct another Christmas classic Home Alone

== 1990s ==
=== Madeline ===
In 1993, it was reported in Variety that TriStar Pictures had purchased the rights to Ludwig Bemelmans' Madeline children's book series, with Columbus in negotiations to direct a film of the property. The film was later made in 1998, directed by Daisy von Scherler Mayer.

=== Fantastic Four film ===
In 1995, Columbus wrote for 20th Century Fox a script for the long time planned Fantastic Four feature-length film. The film was supposed to be released around the 2001 summer. Peter Segal was attached to direct it, but later, he dropped the project, so Raja Gosnell took the director's chair, but he dropped it after being hired by Warner Bros. to direct Scooby-Doo and its sequel. After this, director Peyton Reed entered into the project and wanted to cast Renée Zellweger as Invisible Woman. The film was finally released in 2005, directed by Tim Story and written by Michael France and Mark Frost.

=== Theater of Blood remake ===
In 1995, Columbus intended to remake Douglas Hickox's film Theater of Blood at 20th Century Fox.

=== Justice ===
In 1995, Columbus intended to make Justice, which was about corruption within the New York Police Department at 20th Century Fox.

=== Shields Green and the Gospel of John Brown ===
In 1995, Columbus intended to make Shields Green and the Gospel of John Brown, at 20th Century Fox.

=== 3rd Down and Forever biopic ===
In July 1995, Columbus was set to direct the Joe Don Looney biopic 3rd Down and Forever at 20th Century Fox. In October 1995, Columbus gave Tommy Lee Jones the chance to direct 3rd Down and Forever with Jones set to play Joe's father Don Looney as Columbus was involved in the Planet of the Apes movie.

=== Galaxy High School film ===
Plans for a live-action film adaptation of his own 1986 animated TV series Galaxy High was planned in partnership with John H. Williams of Vanguard Films, and reteamed with Chris Columbus to develop the big screen version of Galaxy High School. After various development deals with both DreamWorks and Paramount Pictures, So far nothing ever came out of it, either being scrapped or in development hell.

=== Daredevil film ===
In 1997, Columbus was hired by Columbia Pictures to write a script for a Daredevil feature film. Columbus' script was later leaked on Internet in 1999. Despite this, Columbia dropped the project and 20th Century Fox bought the rights. The film was finally released in 2003 and was written and directed by Mark Steven Johnson.

=== Big Friendly Giant film ===
On June 13, 1997, Columbus was set to write and direct Big Friendly Giant feature-length film with Frank Marshall and Kathleen Kennedy attached to produce and Robin Williams set to star in the titular role.

=== Boys 'R Us ===
On June 30, 1997, Columbus' 1492 Pictures was set to produce Julie Talen's comedy spec script Boys 'R Us for 20th Century Fox. On April 14, 1998, Gillian Armstrong was set to direct the film.

=== New Year's Eve ===
On August 7, 1997, Columbus was set to produce and possibly direct Andrea Davis and Jeff Rothberg's rom-com pitch New Year's Eve for 20th Century Fox.

=== The Interpreter ===
On September 15, 1997, Columbus was set to produce and direct the comedy he and Robin Williams created The Interpreter for 20th Century Fox with Williams set to star in and produce the film with his wife Marsha.

=== Spider-Man ===
Joseph Kahn revealed that Columbus was considered to direct a Spider-Man movie in 1998 to 1999 before Sam Raimi was hired.

== 2000s ==
=== Will Sebastian ===
In March 2003, Columbus was going to produce and possibly direct David Hubbard's pitch for Warner Bros. In February 2004, the title was revealed to be Will Sebastian and Columbus was set to produce while Mark Waters will direct the film.

=== The Brief History of the Dead film ===
In January 2004, Columbus was set to possibly direct and produce the film adaptation of Kevin Brockmeier's novel The Brief History of the Dead with David Auburn writing the script and Warner Bros. distributing.

=== The Sub-Mariner ===
In July 2004, Columbus was hired to direct a film adaptation of Namor. The film was supposed to be released in 2007, however, in 2005, Columbus abandoned the project.

=== Slanted and Enchanted ===
In September 2004, Columbus was set to direct and produce Ben Queen's script Slanted and Enchanted about a liar returning home with Warner Bros. distributing.

=== Carpe Demon film ===
In February 2005, Columbus was set to direct and produce the film adaptation of Julie Kenner's novel Carpe Demon with Dan and Kevin Hageman writing the script and Warner Bros. distributing. In May 2010, 1492 Pictures and CJ Entertainment were set to co-produce the movie without Warner Bros. and Columbus taking over writing duties from the Hageman Brothers instead of directing the movie. Until 2023, a Canadian television series with Emily Andras as the showrunner was announced likely because the adaptation rights reverted to Kenner.

=== Dilbert film ===
On February 16, 2007, Columbus was in talks to direct a Dilbert film based on the comic strip of the same name. On May 26, 2010, Ken Kwapis was hired to direct the film, instead of Columbus.

=== The Last Campaign film ===
In August 2008, Columbus was set to adapt Thurston Clarke's novel The Last Campaign into a film that he would produce and direct.

=== Ripley's Believe It or Not film ===
In October 2008, Columbus pitched an idea for the Ripley's Believe It or Not film that was approved by Jim Carrey and Paramount, scrapped the previous China-based storyline entirely, with plans for a 2011 release, and hoped that it would be the start of a Ripley's film series. In January 2011, Eric Roth was hired to write the script, with Carrey and Columbus still attached. Ken Atchity and Chi-Li Wong joined the project as producers, alongside Jim Jacks and Sean Daniel and it is intended to be a fantasy film.

=== Welcome to Hoxford film ===
In March 2009, 1492 Pictures was set to produce the feature film adaptation of Ben Templesmith's graphic novel Welcome to Hoxford, which won't relate to the fan film.

== 2010s ==
=== The Graveyard Book film ===
In May 2010, 1492 Pictures acquired the rights and was set to co-produce Neil Jordan's adaptation of Neil Gaiman's novel The Graveyard Book with CJ Entertainment. But in April 2012, Walt Disney Pictures acquired the rights and hired Henry Selick to direct the movie without Columbus, and would be halted in 2024 due to a variety of factors including sexual misconduct allegations against Gaiman.

=== American Hello Ghost remake ===
On February 23, 2011, it was announced that Columbus will direct and produce the remake of Hello Ghost through his company, 1492 Pictures and Next Entertainment World. On, June 30, 2011, Karen Croner was set to write the script. On, June 13, 2013, Universal Pictures optioned the remake and Adam Sandler was set to star in and produce the film.

=== Temple Stay ===
On May 14, 2011, it was announced that Columbus's 1492 Pictures and CJ Entertainment & Media will produce the action-adventure fantasy film Temple Stay with Dan and Kevin Hageman writing the script and JK Youn directing the film.

=== The Cypress House film ===
On June 2, 2011, it was announced that Columbus had acquired rights to adapt the Michael Koryta novel The Cypress House. Columbus would write the script, and produce with partners Michael Barnathan and Mark Radcliffe.

=== American Troll Hunter remake ===
On June 10, 2011, it was announced that Columbus' company 1492 Pictures and CJ Entertainment & Media acquired rights to remake Trollhunter. On September 20, 2013, Neil Marshall was set to direct the remake. In November 2016, the remake was cancelled.

=== The Secret Lives Of Road Crews ===
On September 23, 2011, it was announced that Columbus's 1492 Pictures will produce the action comedy film The Secret Lives Of Road Crews for Paramount Pictures.

=== Killer Pizza film ===
On November 8, 2011, Columbus's 1492 Pictures will produce Adam Green's adaptation of Greg Taylor's book Killer Pizza with Metro-Goldwyn-Mayer set to distribute the film.

=== The Rifleman TV reboot ===
On November 8, 2011, Columbus's 1492 Pictures was set to produce a television reboot of The Rifleman for CBS.

=== How to Live Safely in a Science Fictional Universe film ===
On December 2, 2011, Columbus's 1492 Pictures will produce the adaptation of Charles Yu's book How to Live Safely in a Science Fictional Universe with Brendan Bellomo set to make his directorial debut with the film.

=== Applebaum TV series ===
On January 26, 2012, it was announced that 1492 Pictures will produce the TV series adaptation of Ayelet Waldman book series Mommy Track Mysteries entitled Applebaum for CBS and Columbus will direct the pilot episode.

=== Home Front film ===
On March 30, 2012, it was announced that Columbus will direct, produce, and adapt the Kristin Hannah novel Home Front through 1492 Pictures.

=== Calico Joe film ===
On June 4, 2012, it was announced that Columbus will direct and produce and adapt the John Grisham novel Calico Joe through 1492 Pictures. On October 15, 2020, George Clooney, Grant Heslov, and Bob Dylan took over the film adaptation from Columbus and 1492 Pictures.

=== Creepy anthology film ===
On July 12, 2012, it was announced at Comic-Con that Columbus will produce and write a segment of the anthology film based on the magazine Creepy.

=== Young Sherlock Holmes remake ===
On November 19, 2012, Paramount Pictures announced that Columbus will produce the remake of Young Sherlock Holmes through 1492 Pictures with Evan Spiliotopoulos writing the script.

=== House of Secrets film ===
The film rights to Columbus and Ned Vizzini's House of Secrets trilogy have been picked up by Rise Entertainment, along with Columbus's 1492 Pictures was going to adapt the series from Columbus' initial screenplay with principal photography slated to begin in January 2014. On September 21, 2021, the project later became a TV series for Disney+.

=== Mrs. Doubtfire sequel ===
On April 16, 2014, it was announced that Columbus will direct a sequel to Mrs. Doubtfire with David Berenbaum writing the script and Robin Williams was set to reprise the role of Daniel Hilliard/Mrs. Doubtfire. The film was cancelled because of Williams' death.

=== SS Exodus ===
On August 28, 2014, it was announced that Columbus's 1492 Pictures and Crystal City Entertainment will produce the film adaptation of John Grauel's autobiography SS Exodus with Mark Friedman writing the script.

=== The Shave ===
On October 20, 2015, it was announced that Columbus's Maiden Voyage, Route One Entertainment and Lost City will produce Thomas White and Miles Hubley's police thriller script The Shave. On June 19, 2017, it was announced that Benny Boom will direct the movie.

=== Jane Steele film ===
On March 21, 2016, it was announced that Columbus's 1492 Pictures along with Ocean Blue Entertainment & Prescience and Altus Media will produce the film adaptation of Lyndsay Faye's novel Jane Steele.

=== Welcome to Hitchcock TV series ===
On September 28, 2016, it was announced that Columbus's 1492 Pictures, Vermilion Entertainment, Ocean Blue Entertainment and the Alfred Hitchcock estate would produce Welcome to Hitchcock, the anthology series that would adapt Hitchcock's films into a television series, with Universal Cable Productions distributing the series and Columbus set to direct the pilot episode.

=== Fannie Lou Hamer biopic ===
On July 13, 2017, it was announced that Columbus's 1492 Pictures will produce the Fannie Lou Hamer biopic with Gregory Allen Howard writing the script.

=== Five Nights at Freddy's film ===
On February 12, 2018, it was announced that Columbus would write, direct, and produce a film adaptation of the horror video game franchise Five Nights at Freddy's for Blumhouse Productions. In an interview with Collider on September 29, 2021, producer Jason Blum revealed that Columbus was no longer working on the film.
