= The Brief History of the Dead =

Book by Kevin Brockmeier

- First edition
- Author: Kevin Brockmeier
- Cover artist: Archie Ferguson
- Language: English
- Genre: Fantasy, adventure
- Publisher: Pantheon Books
- Publication date: 2006
- Publication place: United States
- Media type: Print (hardback)
- Pages: 252 (first edition, hardback)
- ISBN: 0-375-42369-9 (first edition, hardback)
- OCLC: 60550844
- Dewey Decimal: 813/.6 22
- LC Class: PS3602.R63 B75 2006

The Brief History of the Dead is a fantasy and adventure novel by American writer Kevin Brockmeier, published in 2006.

== Plot ==
The story takes place in the near future, with chapters alternating between two settings. Half follow Laura Byrd, an employee of The Coca-Cola Company dispatched on a research trip to Antarctica so as to assess the feasibility of the drinks company using the melting ice in their products. The world is gripped by rampant global warming, war, and bioterrorism. The other chapters describe various residents of an afterlife known as The City. This realm is neither a heaven nor a hell, containing both the pleasantries and annoyances of city life. The City appears boundless, and its geography changes to accommodate new arrivals. People appear to remain in The City for as long as at least one person remains alive who knew them. Each have a unique experience in their "crossing" (death), with one commonality: hearing the sound of a heartbeat.

In remote Antarctica, the radio transmitter which Byrd and two colleagues, Puckett and Joyce, used to stay in touch with their base fails. After some time without rescue, Puckett and Joyce undertake the several-day long voyage to the base. Byrd spends weeks alone without any contact, eventually deciding to travel to the base herself. After a difficult journey, she arrives to find all of the base's personnel are dead. She finds that they succumbed to the 'Blinks', the symptoms of a deadly, and probably synthetic, virus. This virus has recently swept the entire world, killing victims within hours. Byrd realises she may be the last person left alive, but nevertheless decides to make a dangerous trip to a powerful radio transmitter in the hope of reaching outside aid. After an even more arduous journey, she makes it to the transmitter, only to find it inoperable. She survives for a short time afterwards before succumbing to the freezing conditions.

In The City the virus results in a massive decrease in population – although large numbers of people appear most of these quickly disappear. After a while the population is reduced to a few thousand scattered individuals. These congregate in one district, and come to understand that they all had some connection to Byrd, some intimately, some only as a passing acquaintance. As Byrd travels the frozen landscape, winter falls on The City. The heartbeat the dead heard during their crossings becomes audible again to all, before ceasing. The previously boundless cityscape begins to reduce in size with intangible but impassible boundaries contracting on the remaining population. The novel ends with this shrinking bubble close to reducing to nothingness.

== Allusions/references to other works ==
Brockmeier quotes James Loewen's Lies My Teacher Told Me at the beginning of the book. The quote describes the belief of many African tribes that humans can be divided into three categories: Those still alive on earth, the recently departed (sasha), and the dead (zamani). When people die they are sasha while people are still alive who remember them. When the last person remembering them dies, they go to the zamani and are then revered and recalled by name only.

A brief afterword to the novel acknowledges a debt to Apsley Cherry-Garrard's Antarctic memoir, The Worst Journey in the World.

A reference is made to the Wandering Jew, a legend from medieval Christian folklore. One character, who believes this legend, speculates about what the emptying of The City could mean in light of this story.

== Release details ==
In September 2003 Brockmeier published the book's first chapter as a short story in The New Yorker.

The novel was first published in the United States by Pantheon Books in 2006.

== Reception ==
The Brief History of the Dead received favourable reviews from various publications, including Publishers Weekly, Salon, and the Library Journal.

The book was nominated for the 2007 New York Public Library Young Lions Award.

== Possible film adaptation ==
On January 13, 2004, filmmaker Chris Columbus was set to direct and produce the film adaptation for Warner Bros. Pictures with David Auburn writing the screenplay.
