= Canton Academy =

Segregation academy in Mississippi, United States

Location
- 1 Nancy Drive; Canton, Madison County, Mississippi 39046; United States; 32.5998342°N 90.016471°W

Information
- Type: Segregation academy Private school
- Motto: "With a bold vision for the future, Canton Academy exists to nurture hearts and challenge minds in a Christian environment."
- Opened: January 1970
- School district: MAIS 3AAA
- Head of School: Jimmy Nix III
- Teaching staff: 28.9
- Grades: K–12
- Enrollment: 366 (2026)
- Colors: Black and Gold
- Fight song: CA is forever Herman today, forward to battle eager for the praise, everyone is loyal none turn their back, cheers for the varsity of gold and black
- Athletics conference: MAIS
- Mascot: Panthers
- Nickname: CA
- Team name: Panthers
- Accreditation: Midsouth Association of Independent Schools
- Website: cantonacademy.org
- Last updated: 9 January 2026

Canton Academy is a private school in Canton, Mississippi, which was established in 1970 to formally preserve racial segregation in schools.

== History ==
Canton opened in January 1970 as a segregation academy. The school's founders, officially known as the Canton Academic Foundation, were so concerned about the impact of school desegregation that they accepted white students from families they knew could not afford tuition. Canton Academy board president J. D. Weeks said that he "anticipat[ed] the public school system of Canton would be virtually all black". In the school's first year, all but one white high school senior withdrew from Canton Rogers High School and enrolled in Canton Academy.

Canton Academy was initially housed in an abandoned tent factory. The curriculum was reported to be similar to public schools, but with an extra focus on the "evils of communism".

In the case Coffey v. State Educational Finance Commission (1969), the United States District Court for the Southern District of Mississippi found that "No Negro pupils would be admitted to the private school."

== Sports ==
Canton competes in shooting sports against Jackson Preparatory School and Tri-County Academy. The school sponsors a Twenty Guns in Twenty Days raffle to support athletics.

== Demographics ==
In the 2025-2026 school year, the school had an enrollment of 366 in pre-kindergarten through 12th grade. A survey conducted for the 2019-2020 school year included enrollment by race and ethnicity for 252 students, of whom 3 were Asian (1.2%), 10 were Black (3.9%), 3 were Hispanic (1.2%), 233 were White (92.5%), and 3 were two or more races (1.2%).

== Notable people ==
Glenn Boyce, chancellor of the University of Mississippi, coached football at Canton Academy. In 2019, Boyce was criticized for his past affiliation with segregation academies like Canton Academy.

== Alumni ==
- Reed Stringer (1979–), college football coach

== Bibliography ==
- Bolton, Charles C. The Hardest Deal of All: The Battle Over School Integration in Mississippi, 1870-1980. University Press of Mississippi, 2005. ISBN 1604730609, 9781604730609.
- Cobb, James Charles. The Most Southern Place on Earth: The Mississippi Delta and the Roots of Regional Identity. Oxford University Press, 1994. ISBN 0195089138, 9780195089134.
