= Nadir of American race relations =

Late 19th-/early 20th-century period of US history

- 1877 – early 20th century
Reconstruction era	Harlem Renaissance; Civil rights movement
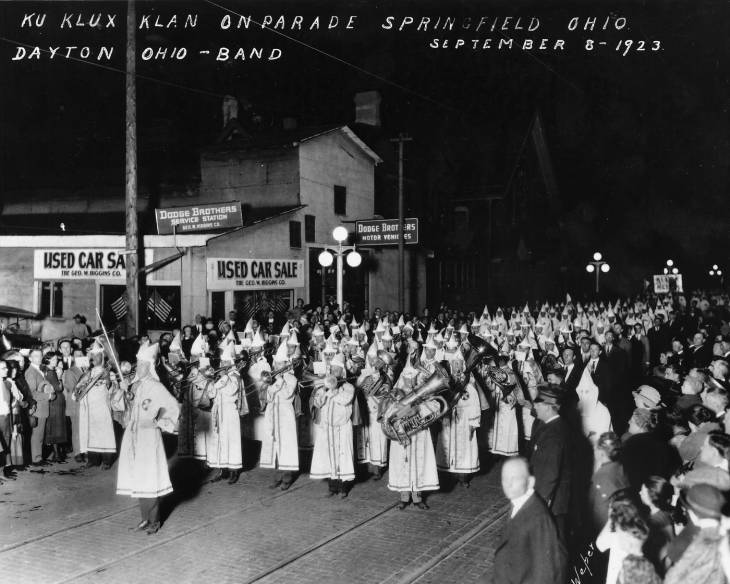
- Ku Klux Klan on parade in Springfield, Ohio, in 1923
- Location: United States (The South)
- Including: Gilded Age; Progressive Era
- Key events: Red Summer; Back-to-Africa movement; Great Migration

The nadir of American race relations is a historical period defined by historian Rayford Logan as the worst time for race relations in the United States after the Civil War ended slavery. It overlapped with the Gilded Age and the Progressive Era, following the Reconstruction era and the financial Panic of 1873, amid a continuing decline in cotton prices. The period was characterized by the legal solidification of Jim Crow laws, the rise of lynchings and racial massacres, and the nationwide institution of sundown towns.

Historians differ on the period's date range. Logan's 1954 book The Negro in American Life and Thought defines "The Nadir, 1877–1901" when "the Negro's status in American society" fell lowest, arguing for 1901 as the turning point when race relations started to improve. Others, such as John Hope Franklin and Henry Arthur Callis, argue for ending dates as late as 1923. James W. Loewen (2006) argues for a later starting date, seeing the post-Reconstruction era as one of widespread hope for racial equity due to idealistic Northern support for civil rights. In Loewen's view, the true nadir only began when Northern Republicans ceased supporting Southern Black people's rights around 1890, and it lasted until the American entry into World War II in 1941.

Logan's focus was exclusively on African Americans in the Southern United States, but the period also represents the worst of anti-Chinese and anti-Asian discrimination, when fear of the so-called Yellow Peril incited harassment and violence on the West Coast and the destruction of Denver's Chinatown.

== Background ==
=== Reconstruction revisionism ===
In the early 20th century, a group of white historians claimed that Reconstruction was a tragic period for the South, when Northern Republicans motivated by revenge and profit used federal troops to force the defeated Southerners to accept corrupt governments run by unscrupulous Northerners and feckless black people. Such scholars generally dismissed the idea that black people could ever be capable of self-government.

Proponents of this view became known as the Dunning School, after William Archibald Dunning (1857 – 1922) of Columbia University. Another Columbia professor, John Burgess, was notorious for writing that "black skin means membership in a race of men which has never of itself ... created any civilization of any kind."

The Dunning School's view of Reconstruction held sway for decades. Its views were dramatized in D. W. Griffith's popular movie The Birth of a Nation (1915) and to some extent in Margaret Mitchell's novel Gone with the Wind (1936). More recent historians have decisively rejected many of the Dunning School's conclusions.

=== History of Reconstruction ===
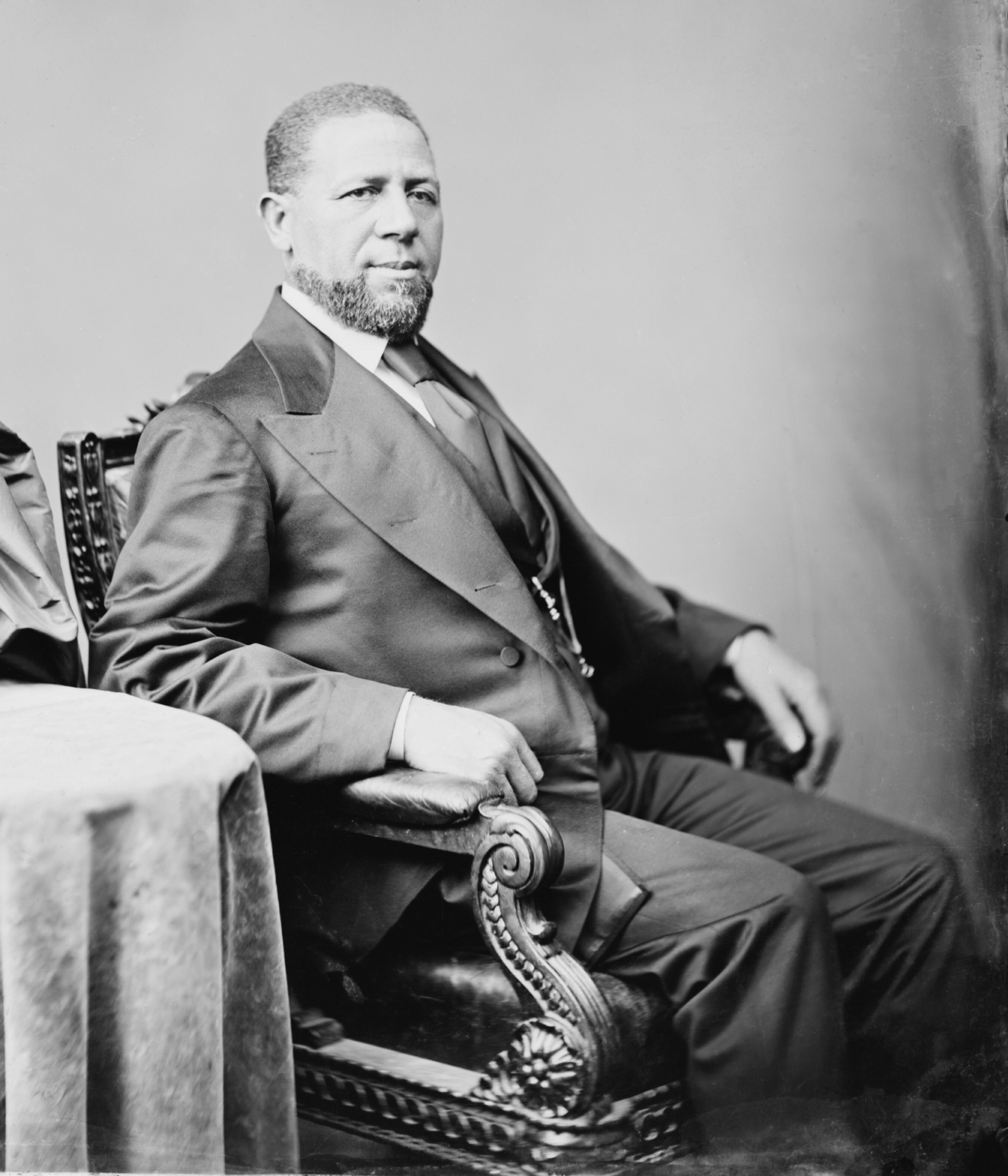
Hiram Revels, the first African American US senator, elected in 1870 from Mississippi. One other black US senator, Blanche K. Bruce, was elected from the same state in 1874.

Today's consensus regards Reconstruction as a time of idealism and hope which resulted in some practical achievements. The Radical Republicans who passed the Fourteenth and Fifteenth Amendments were, for the most part, motivated by a desire to help freedmen. African American historian W. E. B. Du Bois put forth this view in 1910, and later historians Kenneth Stampp and Eric Foner furthered it. The Republican Reconstruction governments had their share of malfeasance, but they benefited many whites as well as blacks, and were no more corrupt than other governments of the day, Democratic as well as Northern Republican.

Reconstruction governments established public education and social welfare institutions for the first time, improving education for both black and white people, and they tried to improve social conditions for the many left in poverty after the long war. No Reconstruction state government was dominated by black people; in fact, black people did not attain a level of representation that was equal to the size of their population in any state.

== Origins ==
=== Reconstruction era violence ===
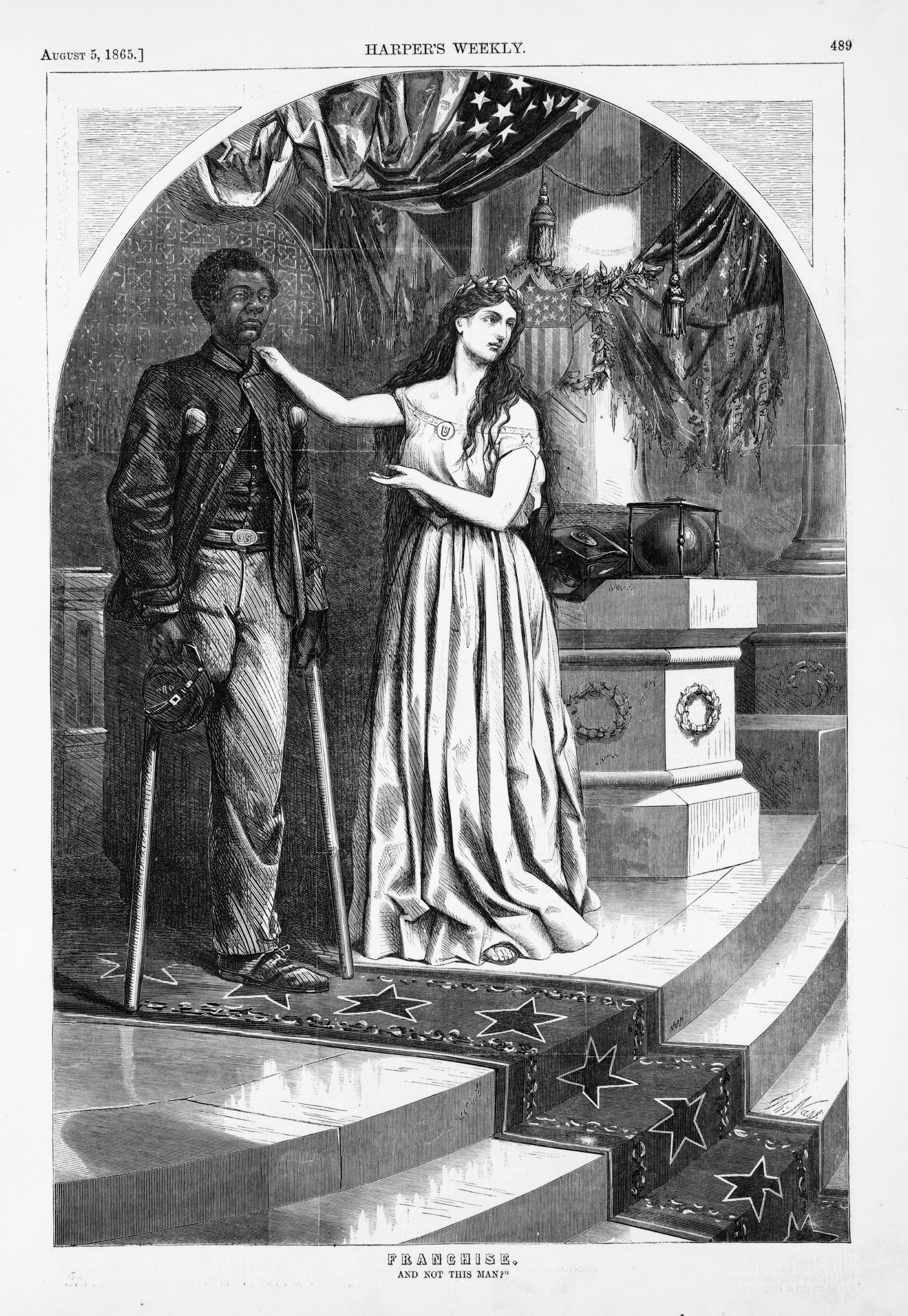
"And Not This Man?", Harper's Weekly, August 5, 1865. Thomas Nast drew this cartoon; in 1865 he, like many Northerners, remembered Black people's military service and favored granting them voting rights.

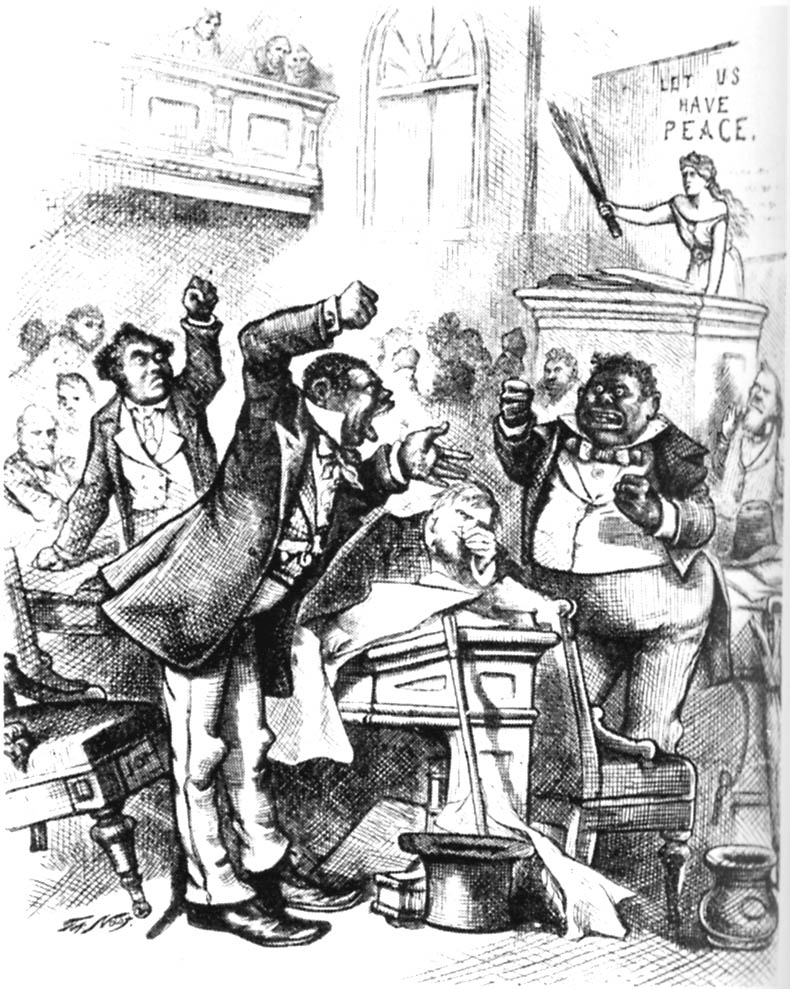
"Colored Rule in a Reconstructed(?) State", Harper's Weekly, March 14, 1874. Nine years later, Nast's views on race had changed. He caricatured black legislators as aggressive buffoons.

For several years after the Civil War, the federal government, pushed by Northern opinion, intervened actively to protect the rights of black Americans. There were limits, however, to these efforts: In Washington, a proposal of land reform made by the Freedmen's Bureau, which would have granted black people plots on the plantation land on which they worked (forty acres and a mule), never came to pass. In the South, many former Confederate rebels were stripped of voting rights, but they resisted Reconstruction with violence and intimidation. James Loewen notes that, between 1865 and 1867, when white Democrats controlled the government, whites murdered an average of one black person every day in Hinds County, Mississippi. Black schools were especially targeted; school buildings frequently were burned, their teachers flogged and occasionally murdered. The postwar terrorist group Ku Klux Klan (KKK) acted with significant local support, attacking freedmen and their white allies; the group was largely suppressed by federal efforts under the Enforcement Acts of 1870–1871, but did not disappear. It was refounded on a national level in the early 20th century.

Despite these failures, black people continued to vote and attend school. Literacy soared, and many African Americans were elected to local and statewide offices, with several serving in Congress. Because of the black community's commitment to education, the majority of black people were literate by 1900.

Continued violence in the South, especially heated around electoral campaigns, sapped Northern resolve. A decade after the long years and losses of the Civil War, Northerners had lost heart for the continued massive commitment of money and arms that would have been required to stifle the stubborn white insurgency. As the financial panic of 1873 disrupted the economy nationwide, the white terrorist insurgency took on new life, exemplified by the Colfax and Coushatta massacres in Louisiana. The next year saw the formation of paramilitary groups, such as the White League in Louisiana (1874) and Red Shirts in Mississippi and the Carolinas, that worked openly to turn Republicans out of office, disrupt black organizing, and suppress black voting. They invited press coverage. One historian described them as "the military arm of the Democratic Party."

In 1874, in a continuation of the disputed gubernatorial election of 1872, thousands of White League militiamen fought against New Orleans police and Louisiana state militia and won. They turned out the Republican governor and installed the Democrat Samuel D. McEnery, took over the capitol, state house and armory for a few days, and then retreated in the face of Federal troops who reinstated the elected governor. This was known as the "Battle of Liberty Place".

=== End of Reconstruction ===
Northerners wavered and finally capitulated to Southern election violence. Former abolitionist leaders like Horace Greeley began to ally themselves with Democrats in attacking Reconstruction governments. By 1875, there was a Democratic majority in the House of Representatives. President Ulysses S. Grant, who as a general had led the Union to victory in the Civil War, initially refused to send troops to Mississippi in 1875 at the request of the governor. Violence surrounded the presidential election of 1876 in many areas, beginning a trend. After Grant, it would be decades before any President would do anything to extend the protection of the law to black people.

== Jim Crow laws and terrorism ==
=== White supremacy ===
"The Resolutions"
(Often called The White Declaration of Independence)

"Believing that the Constitution of the United States contemplated a government to be carried on by an enlightened people; believing that its framers did not anticipate the enfranchisement of an ignorant population of African origin, and believing that those men of the State of North Carolina, who joined in forming the Union, did not contemplate for their descendants a subjection to an inferior race,
"We, the undersigned citizens of the city of Wilmington and county of New Hanover, do hereby declare that we will no longer be ruled, and will never again be ruled, by men of African origin ...."

— The Wilmington Weekly Star (North Carolina)
November 11, 1898

As noted above, white paramilitary forces contributed to whites' taking exclusive power in the late 1870s. A brief coalition of populists took over in some states, but Democrats had returned to power after the 1880s. From 1890 to 1908, they proceeded to pass legislation and constitutional amendments to disenfranchise most black people and many poor whites, with Mississippi and Louisiana creating new state constitutions in 1890 and 1895 respectively, to disenfranchise African Americans. Democrats used a combination of restrictions on voter registration and voting methods, such as poll taxes, literacy and residency requirements, and ballot box changes. The main push came from elite Democrats in the Solid South, where black people were a majority of potential voters. The elite Democrats also acted to disenfranchise poor whites. African Americans were an absolute majority of the population in Louisiana, Mississippi and South Carolina, and represented more than 40% of the population in four other former Confederate states. Accordingly, many whites perceived African Americans as a major political threat, because in free and fair elections, they would hold the balance of power in a majority of the South. South Carolina US Senator Ben Tillman proudly proclaimed in 1900, "We have done our level best [to prevent black people from voting] ... we have scratched our heads to find out how we could eliminate the last one of them. We stuffed ballot boxes. We shot them. We are not ashamed of it."

Conservative white Democratic governments passed Jim Crow legislation, creating a system of legal racial segregation in public and private facilities. Black people were separated in schools and the few hospitals, were restricted in seating on trains, and had to use separate sections in some restaurants and public transportation systems. They were often barred from some stores, or forbidden to use lunchrooms, restrooms and fitting rooms. Because they could not vote, they could not serve on juries, which meant they had little if any legal recourse in the system. Between 1889 and 1922, as political disenfranchisement and segregation were being established, the National Association for the Advancement of Colored People (NAACP) calculates lynchings reached their worst level in history. Almost 3,500 people fell victim to lynching, almost all of them black men.

=== Lynchings ===
Historian James Loewen notes that lynching emphasized the perceived powerlessness of black people: "the defining characteristic of a lynching is that the murder takes place in public, so everyone knows who did it, yet the crime goes unpunished." African American civil rights activist Ida Bell Wells-Barnett conducted one of the first systematic studies of the subject. She documented that the most prevalent accusation against lynching victims was murder or attempted murder. She found black men were "lynched for anything or nothing" – for wife-beating, stealing hogs, being "saucy to white people", sleeping with a consenting white woman—for being in the wrong place at the wrong time.

Black people who were economically successful faced reprisals or sanctions. When Richard Wright tried to train to become an optometrist and lens-grinder, the other men in the shop threatened him until he was forced to leave. In 1911, black racers were barred from participating in the Kentucky Derby because African Americans won more than half of the first twenty-eight races. Through violence and legal restrictions, whites often prevented black people from working as common laborers, much less as skilled artisans or in the professions. Under such conditions, even the most ambitious and talented black person found it extremely difficult to advance.

This situation called the views of Booker T. Washington, the most prominent black leader during the early part of the nadir into question. He had argued that black people could better themselves by doing hard work and being thrifty. He believed that they had to master basic work before they went on to pursue college careers and professional aspirations. Washington believed that his programs trained black people for the lives which they were likely to lead as well as for the jobs which they could get in the South. Washington's position was advanced in his influential Atlanta Exposition Speech in 1895, which was the genesis of the Atlanta Compromise.

W. E. B. Du Bois advocated a more uncompromising position than Washington, stating:

He is striving nobly to make Negro artisans business men and property-owners; but it is utterly impossible, under modern competitive methods, for workingmen and property-owners to defend their rights and exist without the right of suffrage.

Washington had always (though often clandestinely) supported the right of black suffrage, and had fought against disfranchisement laws in Georgia, Louisiana, and other Southern states. This included secretive funding of litigation resulting in Giles v. Harris, 189 U.S. 475 (1903), which was lost due to Supreme Court reluctance to interfere with states' rights.

== Great Migration and national hostility ==
=== African American migration ===
Many black people left the South in an attempt to find better living and working conditions. Logan notes that in the spring of 1879, "some 40,000 Negroes virtually stampeded from Mississippi, Louisiana, Alabama, and Georgia for the Midwest. The largest number fled to Kansas". More significantly, beginning in about 1915, many black people moved to Northern cities in what became known as the Great Migration. Through the 1930s, more than 1.5 million black people would leave the South for better lives in the North, seeking work and the chance to escape from lynchings and legal segregation in the South. While they faced difficulties, overall, they had better chances in the North. They had to make great cultural changes, as most went from rural areas to major industrial cities, and they also had to adjust from being rural workers to being urban workers. As an example, in its years of expansion, the Pennsylvania Railroad recruited tens of thousands of workers from the South. In the South, alarmed whites, worried that their labor force was leaving, often tried to prevent black migration, proving their dependency on black labor.

Black Americans who fled racial oppression either returned to retrieve the rest of their family or sent train tickets back home. In response, as white southerners observed train platforms packed with African Americans, several cities passed ordinances that made it illegal for trains to accept pre-paid tickets. There were ordinances put in place to also prevent group travel of black families or clusters of African Americans who tried to purchase group rates.

=== Northern reactions ===
During the nadir, Northern areas struggled with upheaval and hostility. In the Midwest and West, many towns posted "sundown" warnings, threatening to kill African Americans who remained overnight. These "sundown" towns also expelled African Americans who had settled in those towns both before and during Reconstruction. Monuments to Confederate War dead were erected across the nation – as far away as in Montana, for example.

Black housing was often segregated in the North. There was competition for jobs and housing as black people entered cities which were also the destination of millions of immigrants from eastern and southern Europe. As more black people moved north, they encountered racism where they had to battle over territory, often against Irish American communities, including in support of local political power bases. In some regions, black people could not serve on juries. Blackface shows, in which whites dressed as black people portrayed African Americans as ignorant clowns, were popular in both the North and South. The Supreme Court reflected conservative tendencies and did not overrule Southern constitutional changes resulting in disfranchisement. In 1896, the Court ruled in Plessy v. Ferguson that "separate but equal" facilities for black people were constitutional; the Court was made up almost entirely of Northerners. However, equal facilities were rarely provided, as there was no state or federal legislation requiring them. It would not be until 58 years later, with Brown v. Board of Education (1954), that the Court overruled the decision.

While there were critics in the scientific community such as Franz Boas, eugenics and scientific racism were promoted in academia by many scientists, like Lothrop Stoddard and Madison Grant, who struggled to find "scientific evidence" for the racial superiority of whites and, even when unable to find such evidence, worked to justify racial segregation and second-class citizenship for black people.

=== Ku Klux Klan ===
Numerous black people had voted for Democrat Woodrow Wilson in the 1912 election, based on his promise to work for them. Instead, he segregated government workplaces and employment in some agencies. The film The Birth of a Nation (1915), which celebrated the original Ku Klux Klan, was shown at the White House to President Wilson and his cabinet members. Writing in 1921 to Joseph Tumulty, Wilson said of the film "I have always felt that this was a very unfortunate production and I wish most sincerely that its production might be avoided, particularly in communities where there are so many colored people."

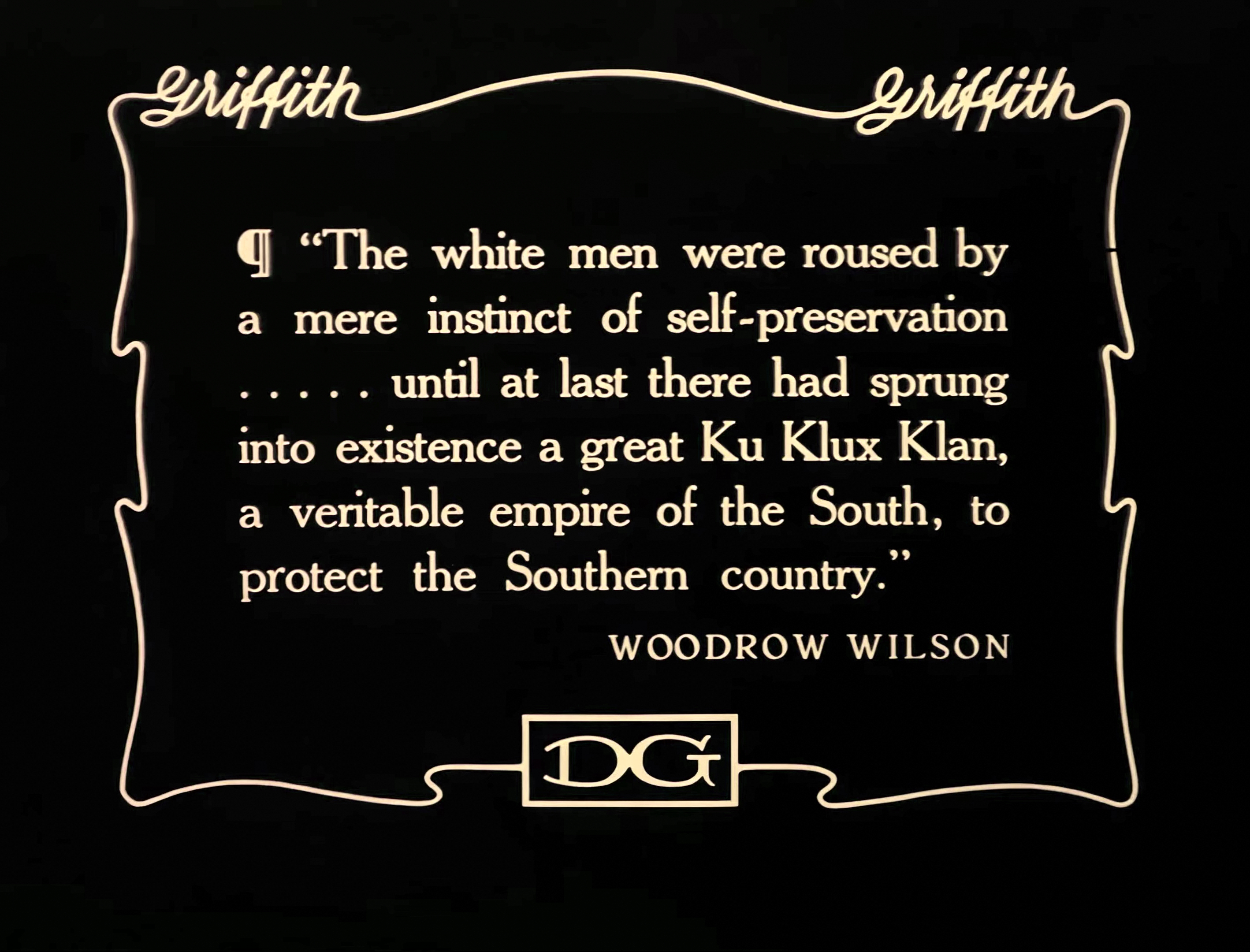
A quote from Woodrow Wilson used in The Birth of a Nation

The Birth of a Nation resulted in the rebirth of the Klan, which in the 1920s had more power and influence than the original Klan ever did. In 1924, the Klan had four million members. It also controlled the governorship and a majority of the state legislature in Indiana, and exerted a powerful political influence in Arkansas, Oklahoma, California, Georgia, Oregon, and Texas.

=== Mob violence and massacres ===
In the years during and after World War I there were great social tensions in the nation. In addition to the Great Migration and immigration from Europe, African American Army veterans, newly demobilized, sought jobs, and as trained soldiers, were less likely to acquiesce to discrimination. Massacres and attacks on black people that developed out of strikes and economic competition occurred in Houston, Philadelphia, and East St. Louis in 1917.

In 1919, there were so many violent attacks in several major cities that the summer of that year became known as Red Summer. The Chicago race riot of 1919 erupted into mob violence for several days. It left 15 whites and 23 black people dead, over 500 injured and more than 1,000 homeless. An investigation found that ethnic Irish, who had established their own power base earlier on the South Side, were heavily implicated in the riots. The 1921 Tulsa race massacre in Tulsa, Oklahoma, was even more deadly; white mobs invaded and burned the Greenwood district of Tulsa; 1,256 homes were destroyed and 39 people (26 black, 13 white) were confirmed killed, although recent investigations suggest that the number of black deaths could be considerably higher.

== Legacy ==
=== Culture ===
Black literacy levels, which rose during Reconstruction, continued to increase through this period. The NAACP was established in 1909, and by 1920 the group won a few important anti-discrimination lawsuits. African Americans, such as Du Bois and Wells-Barnett, continued the tradition of advocacy, organizing, and journalism which helped spur abolitionism, and also developed new tactics that helped to spur the civil rights movement of the 1950s and 1960s. The Harlem Renaissance and the popularity of jazz music during the early part of the 20th century made many Americans more aware of black culture and more accepting of black celebrities.

=== Instability ===
Overall, however, the nadir was a disaster, certainly for black people. Foner points out,

by the early twentieth century [racism] had become more deeply embedded in the nation's culture and politics than at any time since the beginning of the antislavery crusade and perhaps in our nation's entire history.

Similarly, Loewen argues that the family instability and crime which many sociologists have found in black communities can be traced, not to slavery, but to the nadir and its aftermath.

Foner noted that "none of Reconstruction's black officials created a family political dynasty" and concluded that the nadir "aborted the development of the South's black political leadership."

== See also ==
- Black Codes (United States)
- Civil rights movement (1865–1896)
- Civil rights movement (1896–1954)
- Destination Freedom – written by Richard Durham – a 1948–1950 anthology radio drama series about important events and characters in American race-related history
- Jim Crow laws
- Sundown town
- Woodrow Wilson and race

== Sources ==
- Brown, David; Webb, Clive (2007). Race in the American South: From Slavery to Civil Rights. Edinburgh: Edinburgh University Press. ISBN 978-0748613762.
- Chinese American Society (2010). Sen, Hu; Dong, Jielin (eds.). The rocky road to liberty: a documented history of Chinese immigration and exclusion. Javvin Press. ISBN 978-1602670280. OCLC 605882577.
- Current, Richard N.; Williams, T. Harry; Friedel, Frank; Brinkley, Alan (1987). American history: a survey (7th ed.). Knopf. ISBN 978-0394365350. OCLC 14379410.
- Foner, Eric (2002). Reconstruction: America's unfinished revolution, 1863–1877. Perennial Classics. ISBN 978-0060937164. OCLC 48074168.
- Hornsby, Alton Jr., ed. (2008). A Companion to African American History. Oxford: John Wiley & Sons. pp. 312, 381, 391. ISBN 978-1405137355.
- Katz, Michael B.; Sugrue, Thomas J., eds. (1988). "3". W.E.B. DuBois, race, and the city: "The Philadelphia Negro" and its legacy. University of Pennsylvania Press. ISBN 978-0812215939. OCLC 38125924.
- Loewen, James W. (1995). Lies My Teacher Told Me: Everything Your American History Textbook Got Wrong. New Press. ISBN 978-1565841000. OCLC 29877812.
- Loewen, James W. (1999). Lies Across America. New York: Touchstone. ISBN 0684870673.
- Loewen, James W. (2006). Sundown towns: A hidden dimension of American racism. New York: Touchstone. ISBN 978-0743294485. OCLC 71778272.
- Logan, Rayford Whittingham (1997) [1965]. The betrayal of the Negro, from Rutherford B. Hayes to Woodrow Wilson (Reprint ed.). Da Capo Press. ISBN 978-0306807589. OCLC 35777358.
- Martens, Allison Marie (2007). A Movement of One's Own? American Social Movements and Constitutional Development in the Twentieth Century. Ann Arbor. ISBN 978-0549166900.
- Weir, Robert E. (2013). Workers in America: a historical encyclopedia. ABC-CLIO. ISBN 978-1598847185. OCLC 827334843.
