= Sasha and Zamani =

Two aspects of time as expressed in some African cultures

Sasha and Zamani are two aspects of time as expressed in some Eastern and Central African cultures. Sasa are spirits known by someone still alive while Zamani are spirits not known by anyone currently alive. Sasa are concerned with, and are expressed as, the present time, the recent past, and the near future while Zamani is the limitless past. Potential time is the third part of the space-time continuum in African thought. People must learn from the past to act wisely in the present to create a good future.

== Description ==
According to James Loewen in his book Lies My Teacher Told Me: The recently departed whose time overlapped with people still here are the Sasha, the living dead. They are not wholly dead, for they live on in the memories of the living ... when the last person knowing an ancestor dies, that ancestor leaves the Sasha for the Zamani, the dead. As generalized ancestors, the Zamani are not forgotten but revered. Loewen cites and paraphrases the explanation from African Religions and Philosophy by John Mbiti. Sasha and Zamani are not stages of death. They are the two ontological stages (or dimensions) of history in Swahili culture.

In Swahili, the two time dimensions are called sasa--which literally means "now"-- and zamani--which literally means "in the past". Both have quality and quantity. People speak of them as big, small, little, short, long, etc. in relation to a particular event. Sasha refers to the events that have just taken place or are taking place now at the moment or are just about to take place in the near future. Sasha time can extend into the future for about six months or, at the most, one year. Zamani time overlaps Sasha time to some extent in the present, but it also goes back very far into the past time. It absorbs, holds, and stores all the events that have ever occurred. It is more significant than sasha because it stretches endlessly back into the past. It includes the time of myth when all the stories of creation took place and when the great and famous heroes of the past performed their exploits (Anderson 1986, Mbiti 1994).

Zamani is not limited to what in English is called the past.… Zamani overlaps with Sasha and the two are not separable. Sasha feeds or disappears into Zamani. But before events become incorporated into the Zamani, they have to become realized or actualized within the Sasha dimension. When this has taken place, the events "move" backwards from the Sasha into the Zamani…. It is the final storehouse for all phenomena and events, the ocean of time in which everything becomes absorbed into a reality that is neither after nor before. John S. Mbiti, African Religions and Philosophy, 2nd ed. (Oxford: Heinemann, 1990), 22.
