= Fall from the Sky =

Fall from the Sky may refer to:

- Fall from the Sky (album), 2006 album by Melissa Greener
- "Fall from the Sky" (song), 2019 song by Arilena Ara representing Albania in the Eurovision Song Contest 2020

== See also ==
- Things That Fall from the Sky, a collection of short stories by Kevin Brockmeier
