= The Use and Abuse of History =

1981 book by Marc Ferro

- Author: Marc Ferro
- Original title: Comment on raconte l'histoire aux enfants
- Language: French
- Genre: Nonfiction
- Publication date: 1981

The Use and Abuse of History: Or How the Past Is Taught (Note: Second edition: The Use and Abuse of History: Or How the Past Is Taught to Children) (French: Comment on raconte l'histoire aux enfants) is a 1981 French book by Marc Ferro about the interaction between politics and historiography, particularly in the context of textbooks, which, Ferro concludes, often show a distorted, localized version of history, serving local interests and, in particular, promoting patriotism.

The book was described as a classic within two decades of its publication.

== Editions and translations ==
The book was first published in French in 1981 under the title (French: Comment on raconte l'histoire aux enfants: à travers le monde entier, lit. How Children Are Told Stories/ History : Around the Entire World; published by Payot). It has been translated to English in 1984 (published by Routledge & Kegan Paul), with another edition published in 2003 (Routledge). It also received a new edition in French in 1992, included in the revised English edition of 2003 with an appended title (The Use and Abuse of History: Or How the Past Is Taught to Children).

== Content ==
The book's main theme concerns how cultures often reshape their historical narratives by highlighting events that cast them in a positive light while downplaying or omitting aspects of the past that are deemed uncomfortable or politically sensitive. The book contains chapters - effectively case studies, ranging from several to several dozen pages - discussing the problems with textbooks in fifteen countries and regions, with chapters covering, among others, South Africa, Sub-Saharan Africa, West Indies, India, the Arab world, Turkey, Spain, Poland, Germany Japan, US and Australia. The examples covered include numerous case studies. The book discusses, among others, the whitewashing of Polish-Russian history in then-communist controlled Poland in Polish textbooks; the dogged retention of old-style, racist history of Africa as seen in the textbooks of apartheid era South Africa, where African culture or history was minimized or degraded; revisions of Soviet textbooks to censor or rewrite parts about once glorified but later inconvenient leaders like Trotsky, Lenin and Stalin; or the Marxist view of history in Chinese textbooks, which portray the history of China as a series of peasant rebellions. It covers removal of inconvenient historical facts from other works; such as the history of Nazi Germany omitted from early textbooks in post-war Germany (effectively "enabling a generation to deny all knowledge of who Adolf Hitler even was"); the Arab slave trade which is mostly ignored in the textbooks of other African countries, the conflict between Hindu and Muslim in Indian textbooks, the Sunni-era in now Shia-controlled Iranian textbooks, or the Armenian genocide from Turkish ones. Ferro also notes that some changes are moving in the right direction, with the history becoming more global and de-Europeanized or more broadly, de-Westernized; however, he also draws the attention to undue focus on the "provincial" history of the United States in American textbooks, which tend to ignore much of world history.

Ferro also observed other, more nuanced changes, such as the shift in American textbooks from the melting pot to salad bowl framing, reducing the stress on cultural assimilation. He also observed that it was much more common for history to have several competing narratives in democratic countries than in non-democratic ones, where usually only a single narrative is ascendant.

The second edition contains additional content on post-perestroika Russia, newly democratic Poland, and a short comparative study of the history of the Second World War.

== Reception ==
German historian Rainer Riemenschneider reviewed the book in 1982 for the French journal, Histoire de l'éducation.

Richard M. Linkh reviewed the book for The History Teacher in 1986. The reviewer notes that the author has "undertaken an enormous task", reviewing numerous textbooks and other works while compiling material for this work. He finds that the author has tried to analyze too much material, resulting in the treatment of some cases being "oversimplified and superficial"; in particular criticizing some claims made about American historiography which are based on popular novels and movies but no schoolbooks for the relevant period. Despite the shortcomings, he concludes that the author "has made an important contribution to the literature on the teaching of history, and [his book] should be read by secondary school and college teachers".

John W. Cell reviewed the book for The Journal of Interdisciplinary History, also in 1986. He called the book "fascinating, entertaining and important", although he noted the book is mostly about the "abuse" rather than the "use" of history, with its focus on case studies about how historical facts are distorted, particularly in the context of education. Cell notes that Ferro recommends that teachers who want to ensure students understand such issues need to move away from just delivering information and contextualize it, with discussions on how history is an ongoing battleground between various competing narratives.

Arthur Marwick reviewed it for The International History Review, also in the same year. He opined that Ferro "provides quite the most magnificent demonstration yet to be published of the use and significance of history in the modern world", and sees such work as "essential [in] combating the myths which are multiplying throughout the world".

Beverley Southgate reviewed the second English edition in the in 2005 for the Institute of Historical Research. She deemed the work a classic about how history is written for particular audiences, often, with the goal of inducing patriotism, She also noted that two decades since its initial publication, it is still relevant if "a little dated", despite a few added pages.

== See also ==
- Lies Across America, a 1999 book on historical markers by James W. Loewen
- Lies My Teacher Told Me: Everything Your American History Textbook Got Wrong—1995 book by James W. Loewen that critically examines twelve popular American high school history textbooks
