= J. K. Bettersworth =

Mississippi professor and author (1909–1991)

John Knox Bettersworth (1909–1991) was a history professor and author in Mississippi.

James W. Loewen wrote critically of the bigotry and inaccuracy in Betterworth's high school textbooks that were standard in Mississippi schools for decades and Betterworth's work was contrasted with the textbook Loewen and Charles Sallis co-edited in 1974 in Sallis's obituary. Rebecca Miller Davis described Bettersworth's textbooks as stuck in a Lost Cause mentality.

== Writings ==
- Confederate Mississippi: The People and Policies of a Cotton State in Wartime (1943)
- People’s College: A history of Mississippi State (1953)
- Mississippi: A History (1959)
- South of Appomattox
- Mississippi in the Confederacy (1961)
- Mississippi the Land and the People (1981)
- Your Mississippi (1975)
- People’s University: The centennial history of Mississippi State (1980)

=== Articles ===
- ”Mississippi Historiography” (1957)
- ”Humor in the Old Southwest: Yesterday and Today” Mississippi Historical Quarterly 1964
