= History Chip =

Archive of history and personal story

HistoryChip
- Available in: English
- Owner: Jean McGavin
- Editor: Jean McGavin
- Website: historychip.com/about
- Commercial: No
- Launched: 2009; 17 years ago

History Chip is a website dedicated to recreating history as a mosaic of individual recounts.

== History ==
Story Chip was founded in 2009 by Jean Pamela McGavin and her brother Lee McGavin and later renamed History Chip. It is an archive of non-fiction, personal narratives for the expansion of contemporary history by including stories and experiences of all members of society. Its current director is Jean McGavin. History Chip was awarded the 2021 Connecticut Entrepreneur Award for Community Favorite Venture Pre-Revenue.

== Themes ==
All people are invited to share stories on a broad framework. Stories on any topic are accepted for inclusion into the database, describing for example events, societal norms, food, clothing, nature, military, government, etc. Topics are not limited by any in particular and have a broad scope and wide perspective. The editors reserve the right to exclude stories based on hate speech, pornography, and blatant falsehoods. Outreach is expansive in order to include global storytellers and historically underrepresented communities - women, economically disadvantaged, native peoples, people in developing countries, LGBTQ, and people of color.

== Mission and scope ==
History Chip's mission is to present all sides of history. It was in part, a response to teaching materials used in the 1950s and 1960s in Virginia. The Virginia State history textbook, Virginia: History • Government • Geography, taught that slaves' lives were better on the plantations and that they were happier than they would have been in Africa. Virginia children were taught that the day the first slaves were brought to Virginia was a day to celebrate. "Virginia offered a better life for the Negroes than did Africa. In his new home, the Negro was far away from the spears and war clubs of enemy tribes. He had some of the comforts of civilized life. He had better food, a better house, and better medical care than he did in Africa. And he was comforted by a religion of love and mercy."^{A}

Slave narratives and African American points of view were apparently absent from that and many other textbooks. African American perspectives would have offered a more complete and honest historical presentation of life in Virginia. The absence of their story challenges the foundation of all history taught in Virginia at that time. For Virginia history to be truthful, points of view of the significant parties, on significant issues, such as slavery, are imperative.

As textbooks bear the weight of authority, teaching from a textbook renders the information in that textbook as fact when presented to young children. Teaching young children that slavery was a good thing for Africans kidnapped and taken to the Americas (an assumption that would not likely have reflected truthfully in the minds of African Americans), runs the risk of solidifying that notion in the minds of large numbers of children who may maintain those falsehoods into adulthood, running the risk of institutionalizing racism and conflict.

In an effort to counter the sort of history taught with only limited perspectives, as was the case in the Virginia textbook, History Chip was established to include voices from all walks of life, thus expanding historical perspectives and understanding. In an effort to effort to stay true to the voices of everyday voices, people's stories are not edited rather published as submitted.

The website contains approximately 500 articles from 70 different authors.

== Name change ==
The project and website were renamed in 2019 as History Chip, for branding reasons.

== See also ==
- A People's History of the United States
- Lies My Teacher Told Me

== Notes ==
A.See Simkins et al., p.187
