= Lotus Among the Magnolias =

Lotus Among the Magnolias: The Mississippi Chinese is a 1982 book by Robert Seto Quan, published by University Press of Mississippi, with Julian B. Roebuck contributing. It is about the Chinese Americans in the Mississippi Delta.

== Background ==
Quan, a Chinese American, had sociology as his specialty. He conducted interviews through using Cantonese. Quan recalled several from memory, and he did not record them. He had a total of about 1,400 subjects interviewed. Quan's historical information came from James W. Loewen of the University of Vermont.

== Reception ==
Loewen wrote that the work is " an alluring and informative small book" due to the presence of photography and quotes, and he praised how the book "makes a distinctive ethnographic contribution" with Quan having distance from his recordings while having them be accurate. Loewen added that the photography items "are poorly reproduced". Loewen criticized the lack of explanation of how extended families or other sociological dimensions and that the author "does not probe some issues deeply enough."

Ronald Love of Mississippi Valley State University praised the study of the impact of particular generations, arguing that the book "takes Loewen's analysis to a new level of understanding."

Gary B. Mills of the University of Alabama criticized the reliance on unrecorded and memorized interviews. He stated "To the historian Lotus is disappointing." He added that there was entertainment value in reading the book.

Shih-shan H. Tsai of the University of Arkansas stated "As a whole, [the work] is a successful one" though he stated that because Quan he got his historical data from Loewen, which Tsai stated had been contradicted, "historians will find it disappointing."

== See also ==
- The Mississippi Chinese
