= Deep South =

Cultural region of the United States

- Subregion
- Nickname: The Cotton States
- States in dark red compose the core of the Deep South. Those in lighter red have portions that are sometimes included.
- Country: United States

The Deep South or the Lower South is a cultural and geographic subregion of the Southern United States. The term is used to describe the states which were most economically dependent on the plantation system and African chattel slavery, generally Louisiana, Mississippi, Alabama, Georgia, and South Carolina. Parts of other states—East Texas, North Florida, the Arkansas Delta, South Arkansas, West Tennessee, and the southern part of North Carolina—are sometimes included as well.

Following the end of the American Civil War in 1865, the region experienced significant economic hardship and became a focal point of racial tension during the Reconstruction era, when emancipated formerly enslaved people and Free Blacks asserted their rights, and, protected by the Federal government and Union Army, played significant roles in state governments. This incited the creation and growth of the Ku Klux Klan and similar white paramilitary groups. After Reconstruction and the Compromise of 1877, the federal government largely withdrew from the area, and the civil rights of African Americans were suppressed by "Jim Crow" laws for almost a century. The civil rights movement in the 1950s and 1960s helped usher in a new era, sometimes referred to as the New South.

Before 1945, the Deep South was often referred to as the "Cotton States" since cotton was the primary cash crop for economic production, along with rice in Georgia and South Carolina and sugar in Louisiana.

The Deep South is part of the highly religious, socially conservative Bible Belt and is politically a stronghold of the Republican Party, after historically being Democratic, the so-called "Solid South".

It is contrasted with the Mid-South and Tidewater region, as well as the Upper South and the border states, although considerable overlap between these regions exists, with the Mid-South including South Arkansas, the Arkansas Delta, and West Tennessee, and Appalachian Alabama and Georgia belonging to the Upper South.

== Usage ==
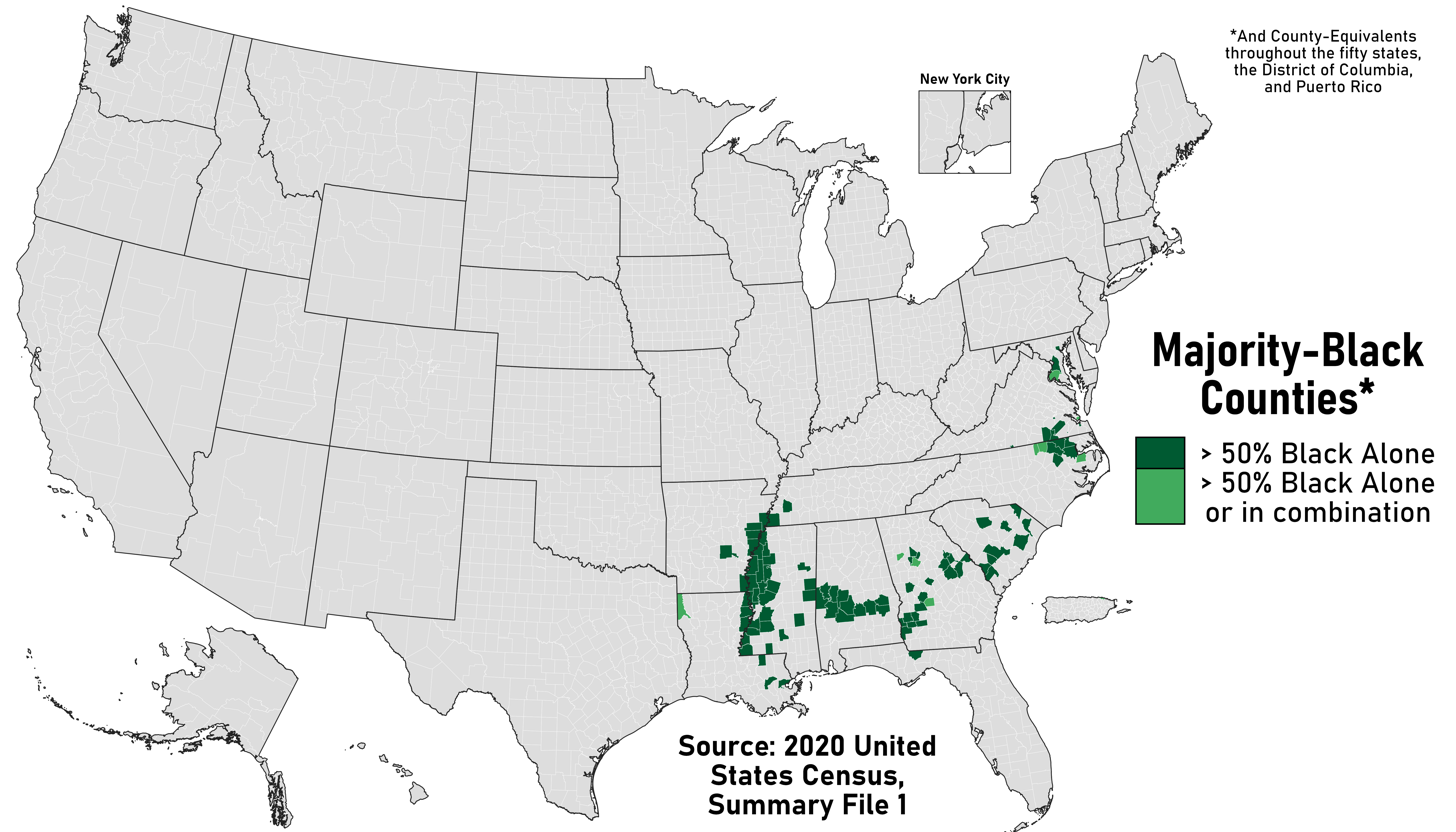
Majority-Black Counties in the U.S. as of the 2020 United States Census

The term "Deep South" is defined in various ways, but most definitions typically include the states: Louisiana, Mississippi, Alabama, Georgia, and South Carolina. Texas and Florida are sometimes included as well, due to their proximity, coastlines with the Gulf of Mexico, histories of slavery, large African American populations, and their former status as part of the Confederate States of America.

The eastern part of Texas is the westernmost extension of the Deep South, typically the area east of Dallas. North Florida is also part of the Deep South region, typically the area north of Ocala. West Tennessee is sometimes included due to its history of slavery, its prominence in cotton production during the antebellum period, and cultural similarity to the Mississippi Delta region. The Arkansas Delta is also sometimes included, though Arkansas is usually considered part of the Upper South.

Seven states seceded from the United States before the firing on Fort Sumter and the start of the American Civil War, which originally formed the Confederate States of America. In order of secession, they are South Carolina, Mississippi, Florida, Alabama, Georgia, Louisiana, and Texas. While eleven states seceded in total, with Virginia, Arkansas, Tennessee, and North Carolina seceding and joining the Confederate States of America following the Fall of Fort Sumter, only the first seven states to secede are usually considered part of the Deep South, with only certain parts of the four Upper South states sometimes being considered part of the Deep South as well.

The first six states to secede were those that held the largest percentage of slaves. Ultimately, the Confederacy included eleven states. A large part of the original "Cotton Belt" is sometimes included in Deep South terminology. This was considered to extend from the South Carolina Lowcountry to Georgia and North Florida, through the Gulf States as far west as East Texas, including West Tennessee, eastern Arkansas, and up the Mississippi embayment. Historically, sugar was the predominant crop in Louisiana, and rice was an important crop in South Carolina.

The inner core of the Deep South, characterized by very rich black soil that supported cotton plantations, is a geological formation known as the Black Belt. The Black Belt has since become better known as a sociocultural region; in this context it is a term used for much of the Cotton Belt, which had a high percentage of African-American slave labor. The Mississippi Delta has been called "The Most Southern Place on Earth", because of its unique racial, cultural, and economic history.

== Origins ==
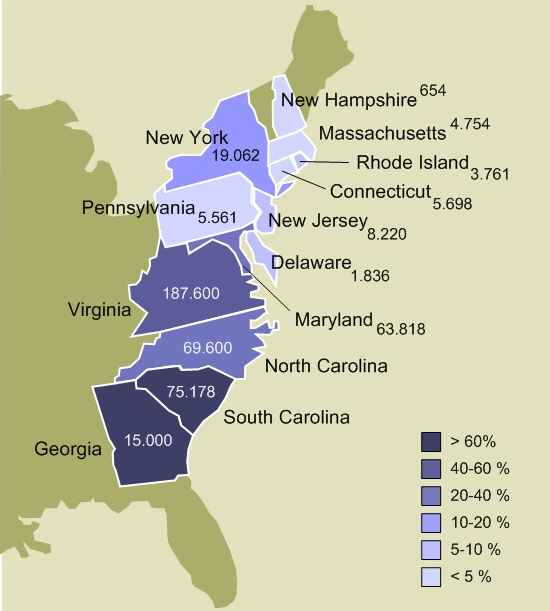
A map of the Thirteen Colonies in 1770, showing the number of slaves in each colony

The colony of South Carolina was dominated by a planter class who initially migrated from the British Caribbean island of Barbados, and used the Barbados Slave Code of 1661 as a model to control and terrorize the African American slave population. Barbados provided a steady flow of sugar produced by slave labor to Europe and North America. The Georgia colony was founded by James Oglethorpe as a buffer state to defend the southern British colonies from Spanish Florida. Oglethorpe imagined a province populated by "sturdy farmers" who could guard the border; because of this, the colony's charter prohibited slavery. However, the ban on slavery was lifted by 1751, and the colony became a royal colony in 1752.

At the time of the American Revolution, South Carolina and Georgia were majority African American, as indicated by the map on the right. In 1765, London philanthropist Dr. John Fothergill remarked on the cultural differences of the British American colonies southward from Maryland and those to the north, suggesting that Southerners were more similar to the people of the Caribbean than to the colonies to the north. A visiting French dignitary concurred in 1810 that American customs seemed "entirely changed" over the Potomac River, and that Southern society resembled those of the Caribbean.

Although often used in history books to refer to the seven states that originally formed the Confederacy, the term "Deep South" did not come into general usage until long after the Civil War ended. For at least the remainder of the 19th century, "Lower South" was the primary designation for those states. At the time of the American Civil War, Florida and Texas were sparsely populated and not fully settled, with Florida and Texas being the least-populated and third least-populated of the 11 Confederate states, respectively.

When "Deep South" first began to gain mainstream currency in print in the middle of the 20th century, it applied to the states and areas of South Carolina, Georgia, southern Alabama, northern Florida, Mississippi, northern Louisiana, West Tennessee, southern Arkansas, and eastern Texas, all historical areas of cotton plantations and slavery. This was the part of the South many considered the "most Southern." In 1939, Florida was described as "still very largely an empty State," with only North Florida largely settled until after World War II.

Later, the general definition expanded to include all of South Carolina, Georgia, Alabama, Mississippi, and Louisiana, as well as often taking in bordering areas of Eastern Arkansas, West Tennessee, East Texas and North Florida. In its broadest application, the Deep South is considered to be "an area roughly coextensive with the old cotton belt, from eastern North Carolina through South Carolina, west into East Texas, with extensions north and south along the Mississippi."

== Early economics ==
Population of African Americans by county in 1860

The Deep South is generally associated historically with cotton production. The 11 Confederate States, including the Deep South, were overwhelmingly rural. New Orleans, Louisiana was the only populous city in the Confederacy during the Civil War.

After the Civil War, the region was economically poor. After Reconstruction ended in 1877, a small fraction of the white population composed of wealthy landowners, merchants and bankers controlled the economy and, largely, the politics. Most white farmers were poor and had to do manual work on their farms to survive. As prices fell, farmers' work became harder and longer because of a change from largely self-sufficient farms, based on corn and pigs, to the growing of a cash crop of cotton or tobacco. Cotton cultivation took twice as many hours of work as raising corn. The farmers lost their freedom to determine what crops they would grow, ran into increasing indebtedness, and many were forced into tenancy or into working for someone else. Some out-migration occurred, especially to Texas, but over time, the population continued to grow and the farms were subdivided smaller and smaller. Growing discontent helped give rise to the Populist movement in the early 1890s. It represented a sort of class warfare, in which the poor farmers sought to gain more of an economic and political voice.

=== Distinct from neighboring regions ===
Ecoregions associated with the Deep South

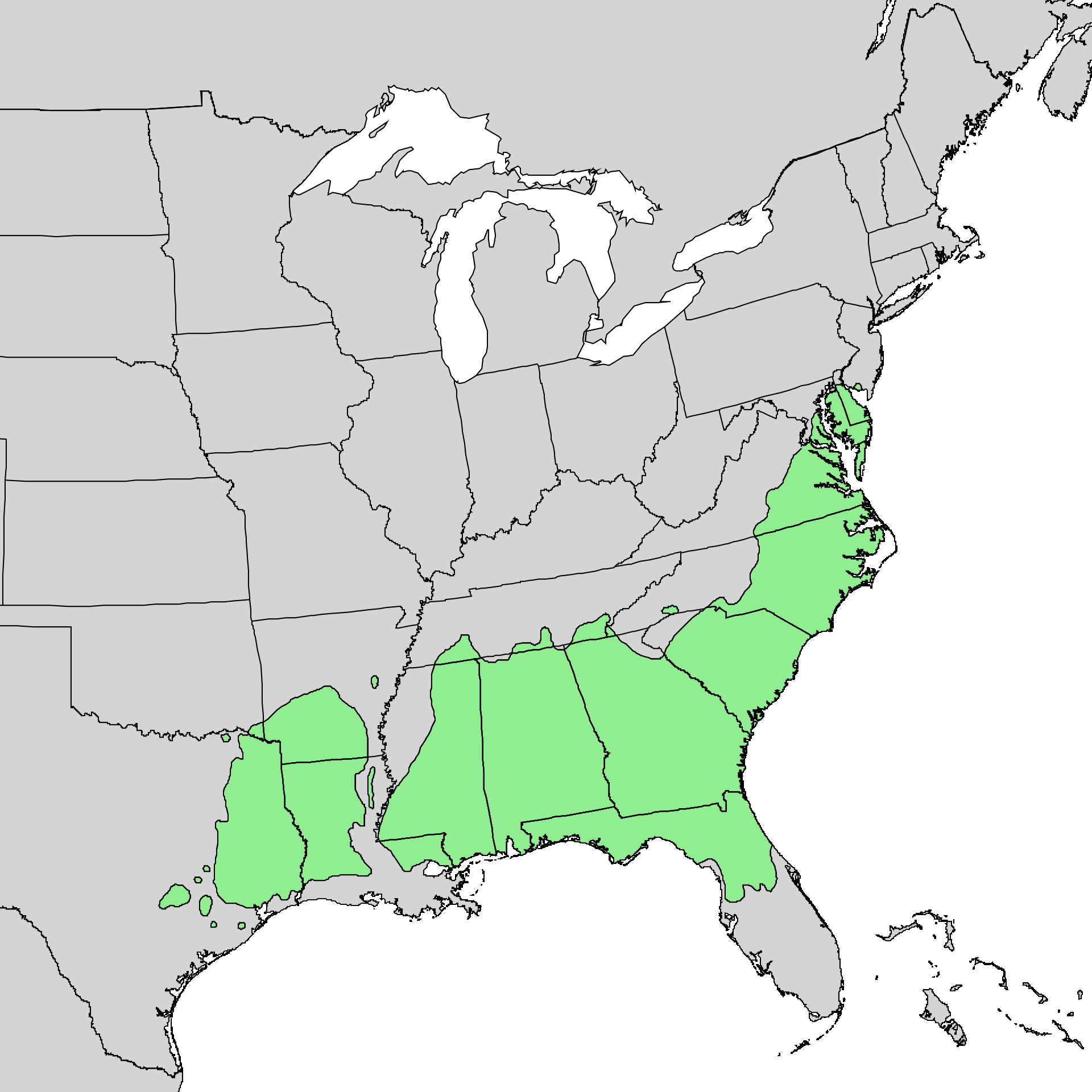
Natural range of loblolly pine, which covers most of the Deep South and Tidewater.

The Mississippi Alluvial Plain created by the Mississippi River.

By 1850, the term "Cotton States" was in common use, and the differences between the Deep South (lower) and Upland South (upper) were recognized. A key difference was the Deep South's plantation-style cash crop agriculture (mainly cotton, rice and sugar), using the forced labor of enslaved African Americans on large farms while plantation owners tended to live in towns and cities. This system of plantation farming was originally developed in the Caribbean West Indies and introduced to the United States in South Carolina and Louisiana, from where it spread throughout the Deep South, although there were local exceptions wherever conditions did not support the system. The sharp division between town and country, the intensive use of a few cash crops, and the high proportion of slaves, all differed from the Upland South.

The Tidewater region, encompassing the Chesapeake Bay and Eastern North Carolina, stands out as different from both the Deep South and Upland South. Its history of slavery originated in Virginia and predated the Caribbean plantation model, relying on tobacco as a cash crop from the start. Tidewater had few urban centers, instead establishing multiple markets along tributaries. Cotton and rice operations were large and factory-like, while tobacco profits hinged on skilled, careful, and efficient labor units.

Despite being the southernmost part of the continental United States, South Florida is not considered part of the Deep South. It has a tropical climate and high levels of migration from the Caribbean and Latin America, particularly in the densely populated Miami metropolitan area.

== From Reconstruction to the Civil Rights Movement ==
After 1950, the region became a major center of the Civil Rights Movement, including: the work of Martin Luther King Jr., the 1955 Montgomery bus boycott, the 1960 founding of the Student Nonviolent Coordinating Committee (SNCC), and the 1964 Freedom Summer.

== Major cities and urban areas ==
The Deep South has three major Metropolitan statistical areas (MSAs) located solely within its boundaries, with populations exceeding 1,000,000 residents (Five including Memphis and Charlotte). Atlanta, the 6th largest metro area in the United States, is the Deep South's largest population center, followed by New Orleans and Birmingham.

=== Metropolitan areas ===
The 16 Deep South metropolitan areas (MSAs) within the 150 largest population centers in the United States are ranked below: * Indicates state capital

Rank	City	State	City (2022)	Metro Area	MSA (2022)	National Rank	CSA (2022)
1	Atlanta*	Georgia	499,127	Atlanta-Sandy Springs-Alpharetta, GA MSA	6,222,106	6	7,136,414
2	New Orleans	Louisiana	369,749	New Orleans-Metairie, LA MSA	1,246,176	47	1,348,462
3	Birmingham	Alabama	196,910	Birmingham-Hoover, AL MSA	1,116,857	50	1,362,731
4	Greenville	South Carolina	72,310	Greenville-Anderson, SC MSA	958,958	60	1,561,465
5	Baton Rouge*	Louisiana	221,453	Baton Rouge, LA MSA	873,060	66	1,010,108
6	Columbia*	South Carolina	139,698	Columbia, SC MSA	847,686	72	1,073,039
7	Charleston	South Carolina	153,672	Charleston-North Charleston, SC MSA	830,529	74	799,636
8	Augusta	Georgia	202,096	Augusta-Richmond County, GA-SC MSA	624,083	96	615,933
9	Jackson*	Mississippi	145,995	Jackson-Yazoo City, MS MSA	583,197	99	688,270
10	Myrtle Beach	South Carolina	38,417	Myrtle Beach-Conway-North Myrtle Beach SC-NC MSA	536,165	111	447,823
11	Huntsville	Alabama	221,933	Huntsville, AL MSA	514,465	113	879,315
12	Lafayette	Louisiana	121,389	Lafayette, LA MSA	481,125	118	562,898
13	Mobile	Alabama	183,289	Mobile County, AL MSA	411,411	128	657,846
14	Gulfport	Mississippi	72,236	Gulfport-Biloxi-Pascagoula, MS MSA	420,782	133	442,432
15	Savannah	Georgia	148,004	Savannah, GA MSA	418,373	134	629,401
16	Shreveport	Louisiana	180,153	Shreveport-Bossier City, LA MSA	385,154	140	420,797

Other substantial cities include:

State	Cities
Alabama	Montgomery, Tuscaloosa, Auburn, and Dothan
Georgia	Columbus, Macon, Valdosta and Athens
Louisiana	Alexandria, Monroe, and Lake Charles
Mississippi	Meridian, Tupelo, and Hattiesburg
South Carolina	Sumter, and Florence

Other cities sometimes included as part of the Deep South:

Rank	City	State	City (2022)	Metro Area	MSA (2022)	National Rank	CSA (2022)
1	Houston	Texas	2,314,157	Houston–Pasadena–The Woodlands, TX MSA	7,796,182	5	7,996,140
2	Memphis	Tennessee	621,056	Memphis, TN MSA	1,332,305	43	1,382,503

== Climate ==
Geographic regions associated with the Deep South

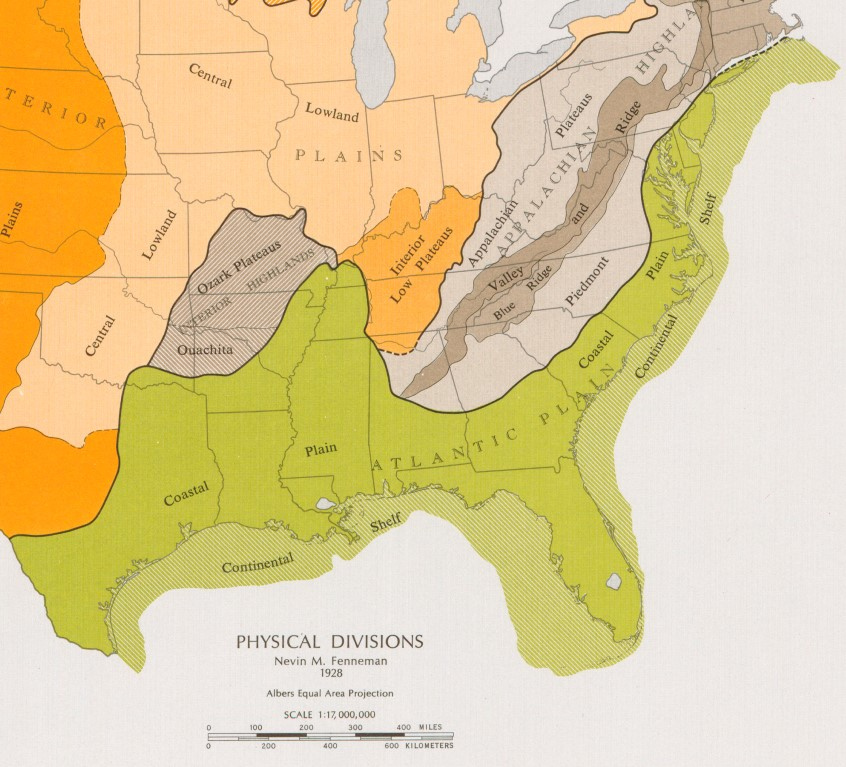
Extent of the Atlantic Plain Continental Shelf province as indicated by the 1928 work by Fenneman.

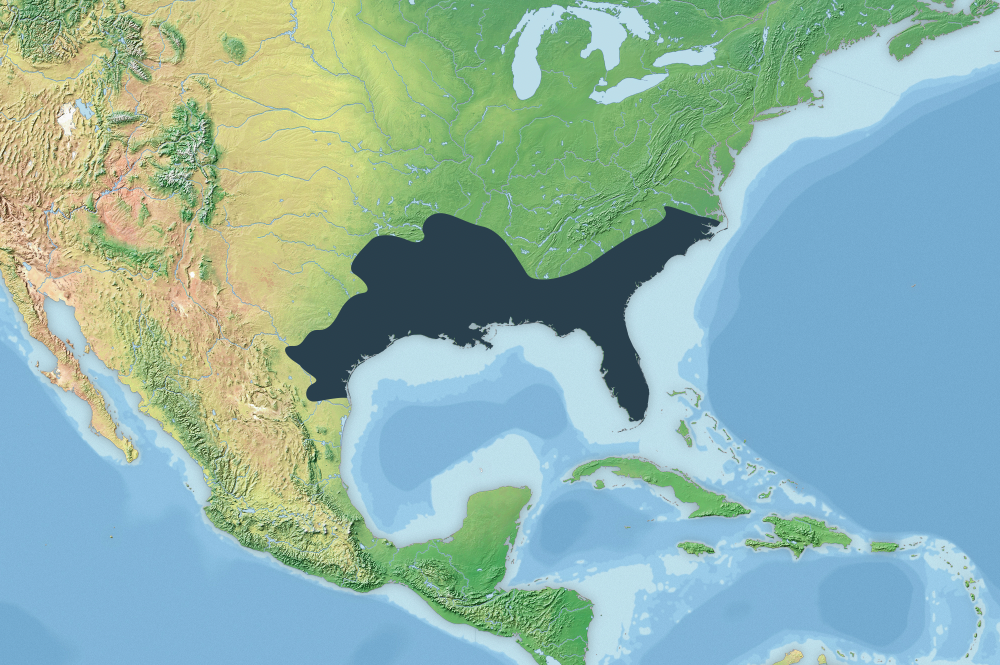
Approximate range of the American alligator.

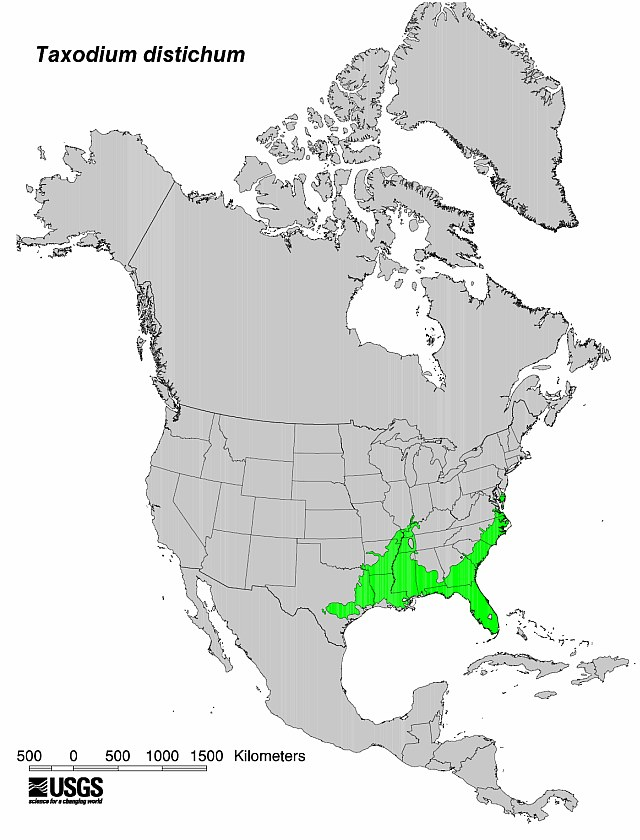
Native range of bald cypress.

As part of the Sun Belt and Atlantic Plain, the Deep South tends to have a subtropical climate with long hot summers and short mild winters. The 35th parallel north, which is used to define the northern boundary of the subtropics, defines the southern border of Tennessee, and the border between North Carolina and Georgia.

The climate tends to display more pronounced subtropical characteristics the closer one gets to the Gulf Coast. For example, the Deep South substantially overlaps with the range of the American alligator and the native range of the bald cypress.

Crops grow readily in the Deep South due to its climate consistently providing growing seasons of at least six months before the first frost. Some common environments include bayous and swamplands, as well as the southern pine forests. Due to its proximity to the Gulf of Mexico and Atlantic Ocean, hurricanes are also a frequently-occurring natural disaster.

Booker T. Washington wrote in his 1901 autobiography

I have often been asked to define the term "Black Belt". So far as I can learn, the term was first used to designate a part of the country which was distinguished by the colour of the soil. The part of the country possessing this thick, dark, and naturally rich soil was, of course, the part of the South where the slaves were most profitable, and consequently they were taken there in the largest numbers. Later, and especially since the war, the term seems to be used wholly in a political sense—that is, to designate the counties where the black people outnumber the white.

== People ==
2000 Census Population Ancestry Map, with African-American ancestry in purple.

Most White people in the Deep South who identified themselves with one European ethnic group in the 1980 census self-identified as English. Though Kentucky, in the Upland South, had the highest amount within the South identifying English as their heritage. This occurred in every southern state with the exception of Louisiana where more White people self-identified as French than English. A large number of the White population also derives from ethnic groups of Ireland (Irish and Ulster Scots). With regard to White people in the Deep South who reported only a single European-American ancestry group, the 1980 census showed the following self-identification in each state in this region:

- Alabama – 857,864 of 2,165,653 respondents (41%) self-identified as English only, which was the state's largest ancestral group by a wide margin.
- Georgia – 1,132,184 of 3,009,486 respondents (37.62%) self-identified as English only.
- Mississippi – 496,481 of 1,551,364 respondents (32%) self-identified as English only, which was the state's largest ancestral group by a wide margin.
- Florida – 1,132,033 of 5,159,967 respondents (21.94%) self-identified as English only.
- Louisiana – 480,711 of 2,319,259 respondents (20.73%) self-identified as French only, followed closely by 440,558 English-only respondents (19%).
- South Carolina – 578,338 of 1,706,966 respondents (33.88%) self-identified as English only. This is likely due to the fact that British colonization along the coasts of present-day South Carolina began earlier than colonization of other areas commonly classified as the Deep South.
- Texas – 1,639,322 of 7,859,393 respondents (20.86%) self-identified as English only, which was the state's largest ancestral group by a large margin.

These figures do not take into account people who self-identified as English and some other ancestral group. When the two were added together, people who self-identified as being English with other ancestry, made up an even larger portion of southerners.

As of 2003, the majority of Black Americans in the South live in the Black Belt in the American South from Virginia to Texas.

Hispanic and Latino Americans largely started arriving in the Deep South during the 1990s, and their numbers have grown rapidly. Politically they have not been very active.

== Politics ==
This map shows the county swing in the 1964 US presidential election. The 5 Deep South states, along with Northern Florida, had the strongest swings to Republican nominee Barry Goldwater. Note that Texas was the home state of Democratic nominee Lyndon B. Johnson.

Political expert Kevin Phillips states that, "From the end of Reconstruction until 1948, the Deep South Black Belts, where only whites could vote, were the nation's leading Democratic Party bastions."

From the late 1870s to the mid-1960s, conservative whites of the Deep South held control of state governments and overwhelmingly identified with and supported the Democratic Party. The most powerful leaders belonged to the party's moderate-to-conservative wing. The Republican Party would only control mainly mountain districts in Southern Appalachia, on the fringe of the Deep South, during the "Solid South" period.

At the turn of the 20th century, all Southern states, starting with Mississippi in 1890, passed new constitutions and other laws that effectively disenfranchised the great majority of blacks and sometimes many poor whites as well. Blacks were excluded subsequently from the political system entirely. The white Democratic-dominated state legislatures passed Jim Crow laws to impose white supremacy, including caste segregation of public facilities. In politics, the region became known for decades as the "Solid South". While this disenfranchisement was enforced, all of the states in this region were mainly one-party states dominated by white Southern Democrats. Southern representatives accrued outsized power in the Congress and the national Democratic Party, as they controlled all the seats apportioned to southern states based on total population, but only represented the richer subset of their white populations. In the 1928 presidential election, Al Smith received serious backlash as a Catholic, but carried all 5 Deep South states, though he nearly lost Alabama.

Major demographic changes would ensue in the 20th century. During the two waves of the Great Migration (1916–1970), a total of six million African Americans left the South for the Northeast, Midwest, and West, to escape the oppression and violence in the South. Beginning with the Goldwater–Johnson election of 1964, a significant contingent of white conservative voters in the Deep South stopped supporting national Democratic Party candidates and switched to the Republican Party. They still would vote for many Democrats at the state and local level into the 1990s. Political scientist Seth McKee concluded that in the 1964 presidential election, "Once again, the high level of support for Goldwater in the Deep South, and especially their Black Belt counties, spoke to the enduring significance of white resistance to black progress."

White southern voters consistently voted for the Democratic Party for many years to hold onto Jim Crow Laws. Once Franklin D. Roosevelt came to power in 1932, the limited southern electorate found itself supporting Democratic candidates who frequently did not share its views. Journalist Matthew Yglesias argues:

The weird thing about Jim Crow politics is that white southerners with conservative views on taxes, moral values, and national security would vote for Democratic presidential candidates who didn't share their views. They did that as part of a strategy for maintaining white supremacy in the South.

Kevin Phillips states that, "Beginning in 1948, however, the white voters of the Black Belts shifted partisan gears and sought to lead the Deep South out of the Democratic Party. Upcountry, pineywoods and bayou voters felt less hostility towards the New Deal and Fair Deal economic and caste policies which agitated the Black Belts, and for another decade, they kept The Deep South in the Democratic presidential column.

In the 1968 election, George Wallace carried all five Deep South states except for South Carolina, as well as Arkansas. Phillips emphasizes the three-way 1968 presidential election:

Wallace won very high support from Black Belt whites and no support at all from Black Belt Negroes. In the Black Belt counties of the Deep South, racial polarization was practically complete. Negroes voted for Hubert Humphrey, whites for George Wallace. GOP nominee Nixon garnered very little backing and counties where Barry Goldwater had captured 90 percent to 100 percent of the vote in 1964.

The Republican Party in the South had been crippled by the disenfranchisement of blacks, and the national party was unable to relieve their past with the South where Reconstruction was negatively viewed. During the Great Depression and the administration of Democrat Franklin D. Roosevelt, some New Deal measures were promoted as intending to aid African Americans across the country and in the poor rural South, as well as poor whites. In the post-World War II era, Democratic Party presidents and national politicians began to support desegregation and other elements of the Civil Rights Movement, from President Harry S. Truman's desegregating the military, to John F. Kennedy's support for non-violent protests. These efforts culminated in Lyndon B. Johnson's important work in gaining Congressional approval for the Civil Rights Act of 1964 and Voting Rights Act of 1965. Since then, upwards of 90 percent of African Americans in the South have voted for the Democratic Party, including 93 percent for Obama in 2012.

=== Since the late 20th century ===
Historian Thomas Sugrue attributes the political and cultural changes, along with the easing of racial tensions, as the reason why Southern voters began to vote for Republican national candidates, in line with their political ideology. Since then, white Deep South voters have tended to vote for Republican candidates in most presidential elections. The Democratic Party has won some in the Deep South since the late 20th century: the 1976 election when Georgia native Jimmy Carter received the Democratic nomination, the 1980 election when Carter won Georgia; the 1992 election when Arkansas native and former governor Bill Clinton won Georgia, Tennessee, Louisiana, and Arkansas, the 1996 election when the incumbent president Clinton again won Louisiana, Tennessee and Arkansas, and when Georgia was won by Joe Biden in the 2020 United States presidential election.

In 1995, Georgia Republican Newt Gingrich was elected by representatives of a Republican-dominated House as Speaker of the House. The incumbent Speaker of the House since October 2023, Republican Mike Johnson, is from Louisiana.

Since the 1990s, the white majority has continued to shift toward Republican candidates at the state and local levels. This trend culminated in 2014 when the Republicans swept every statewide office in the Deep South region midterm elections. As a result, the Republican party came to control all the state legislatures in the region, as well as all House seats that were not representing majority-minority districts.

Presidential elections in which the Deep South diverged noticeably from the Upper South occurred in 1928, 1948, 1964, 1968, and, to a lesser extent, in 1952, 1956, 1992, and 2008. Former Arkansas Governor Mike Huckabee fared well in the Deep South in the 2008 Republican primaries, losing only one state (South Carolina) while running (he had dropped out of the race before the Mississippi primary).

Except for Georgia, the Deep South is strongly Republican. Louisiana, Mississippi, Alabama, and South Carolina have voted Republican for president in every presidential election since 2000. Georgia is the most populous and urbanized Deep South state.

Georgia is considered a swing state. In 2020, the state of Georgia was considered a toss-up state hinting at a possible Democratic shift in the area. It ultimately voted Democratic, in favor of Joe Biden. During the 2021 January Senate runoff elections, Georgia also voted for two Democrats, Jon Ossoff and Raphael Warnock, with Warnock winning re-election to a full term the following year. In 2024, Republican Donald Trump won the state by a 2.2% margin, with Republicans holding every Georgia statewide office, its state Supreme Court, and its state legislature; while in 2026, Georgia elected Keisha Lance Bottoms, a Democrat, and Democrats gained majority in the Georgia House of Representatives.

== States ==
From colonial times to the early twentieth century, much of the Lower South had a black majority. Three Southern states had populations that were majority-black: Louisiana (from 1810 until about 1890), South Carolina (until the 1920s), and Mississippi (from the 1830s to the 1930s). In the same period, Georgia, Alabama, and Florida had populations that were nearly 50% black, while Maryland, North Carolina, and Virginia had black populations approaching or exceeding 40%. Texas' black population reached 30%.

The demographics of these states changed markedly from the 1890s through the 1950s, as two waves of the Great Migration led more than 6,500,000 African-Americans to abandon the economically depressed, segregated Deep South in search of better employment opportunities and living conditions, first in Northern and Midwestern industrial cities, and later west to California. One-fifth of Florida's black population had left the state by 1940, for instance. During the last thirty years of the twentieth century into the twenty-first century, scholars have documented a reverse New Great Migration of black people back to southern states, but typically to destinations in the New South, which have the best jobs and developing economies.

The District of Columbia, one of the magnets for black people during the Great Migration, was long the sole majority-minority federal jurisdiction in the continental U.S. The black proportion has declined since the 1990s due to gentrification and expanding opportunities, with many black people moving to southern states such as Texas, Georgia, Florida, and Maryland and others migrating to jobs in states of the New South in a reverse of the Great Migration.

== Transportation ==
- U.S. Route 90 runs from Van Horn, Texas to Jacksonville, Florida.
- U.S. Route 11 runs through the Deep South to the Canadian border in New York.
- Interstate 10 is a major transcontinental east–west highway that travels through the far southern portion of the Deep South, with its eastern terminus at I-95 in Jacksonville, Florida.
- Interstate 55 is a major north–south route traveling from Chicago, Illinois to New Orleans, Louisiana. The interstate travels through the Deep South cities of Memphis, Jackson, and New Orleans.
- Interstate 40 is a major transcontinental east–west route that travels from Barstow, California to Wilmington, North Carolina. It meets Interstate 55 in Memphis.
- Interstate 49 runs north–south centrally in the United States. It runs through the Deep South from Texarkana, Arkansas through Shreveport, and Alexandria to Lafayette, Louisiana.
- Interstate 20 runs from West Texas to Florence, South Carolina. It travels through the Deep South cities of Tyler, Shreveport, Jackson, Birmingham, Atlanta, Augusta, and Columbia.
- Interstate 75 runs from Chattanooga, Tennessee through Georgia down to Miami, Florida.
