= The View from the Seventh Layer =

Book by Kevin Brockmeier

- Hardcover edition
- Author: Kevin Brockmeier
- Language: English
- Genre: Short stories
- Publisher: Pantheon Books
- Publication date: March 18, 2008
- Publication place: United States
- Media type: Print (Hardcover, Paperback)
- Pages: 288 pp.
- ISBN: 978-0375425301

The View from the Seventh Layer is a collection of 13 short stories by American author Kevin Brockmeier. The stories' genres include fables, science fiction, fairy tales, and a choose-your-own-adventure story. Each of the stories ties to the theme of considering big life questions through ordinary characters and ordinary problems.

== Stories ==
1. A Fable Ending in the Sound of a Thousand Parakeets
2. The View from the Seventh Layer
3. The Lives of the Philosophers
4. The Year of Silence
5. A Fable with a Photograph of a Glass Mobile on the Wall
6. Father John Melby and the Ghost of Amy Elizabeth
7. The Human Soul as a Rube Goldberg Device: A Choose-Your-Own-Adventure Story
8. The Lady with the Pet Tribble
9. A Fable Containing a Reflection the Size of a Match Head in Its Pupil
10. Home Videos
11. The Air Is Full of Little Holes
12. Andrea Is Changing Her Name
13. A Fable with Slips of White Paper Spilling from the Pockets
