= The Ceiling (short story) =

Short story by Kevin Brockmeier

The Ceiling is a short story by American writer Kevin Brockmeier that won the O. Henry Award in 2002. It previously appeared in McSweeney's Number 7.
