= Marc Ferro =

French historian (1924–2021)

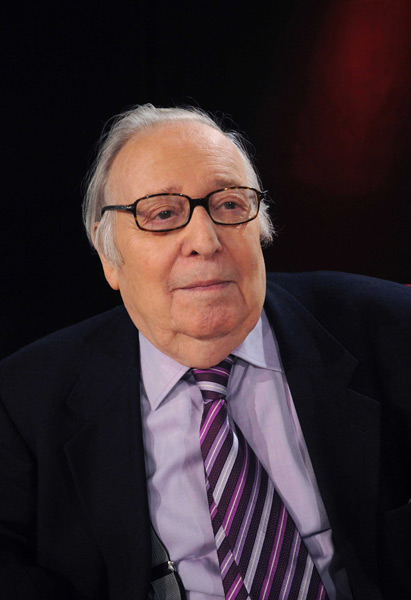
- Born: 24 December 1924; Paris, France
- Died: 21 April 2021 (aged 96); Maisons-Laffitte, France
- Occupation: Historian

Marc Ferro (French pronunciation: [maʁk fɛʁo]; 24 December 1924 – 21 April 2021) was a French historian. Author of several books, including The Use and Abuse of History.

== Life and career ==
Marc Ferro was born in Paris to a Greek-Italian father and a Russian-born Jewish mother (née Firdmann (Oudia)), who died in Auschwitz in June 1943.

Ferro worked on early twentieth-century European history, specialising in the history of Russia and the USSR, as well as the history of cinema.

He was Director of Studies in Social Sciences at the École des hautes études en sciences sociales. He was a co-director of the French review Annales and co-editor of the Journal of Contemporary History.

He also directed and presented television documentaries on the rise of the Nazis, Lenin and the Russian revolution and on the representation of history in cinema.

Ferro died from COVID-19 complications in Maisons-Laffitte in April 2021, at the age of 96.

== Honours and awards ==
=== Honours ===
- Knight of the Legion of Honour
- Officier of the National Order of Merit
- Officer of the Ordre des Palmes académiques
- Knight of the Ordre des Arts et des Lettres

=== Awards ===
- City of Paris History Film Prize (France, 1975)
- Prize Clio (France, 1988)
- Europe's Historical Prize (1994)
- Peace Prize (France, 2007)
- Prize Saint-Simon (France, 2011)

=== Honorary degrees ===
- Moscow State University
- Bordeaux Montaigne University
- University of Chile.

== Bibliography ==
- La Révolution de 1917, Paris, Aubier Éditions Montaigne, 1967 [English translation: The Russian revolution of February 1917, translated by J.L. Richards, notes and bibliography translated by Nicole Stone, London: Routledge & Kegan Paul, 1972]
- La Révolution de 1917 T.2: Octobre: Naissance D'une société, Paris, Aubier Éditions Montaigne, 1967 (reprinted in 1976, then in 1997 at Albin Michel) [English translation: October 1917: a social history of the Russian revolution , translated by Norman Stone, London: Routledge & Kegan Paul, 1980]
- La Grande Guerre, 1914-1918, Paris, Gallimard, 1968 (reprinted 1987) [English translation: The Great War, 1914-1918, 1972]
- Cinéma et Histoire, Paris, Denoël, 1976 (réédité chez Gallimard en 1993) [English translation: Cinema and history, translated by Naomi Greene, 1988]
- L'Occident devant la révolution soviétique, Brussels, Complexe, 1980
- Suez, Brussels, Complexe, 1981
- Comment on raconte l'histoire aux enfants à travers le monde, Paris, Payot, 1981 [English translation: The Use and Abuse of History: Or How the Past Is Taught]
- L'Histoire sous surveillance : science et conscience de l'histoire, Paris, Calmann-Lévy, 1985 (reedited in 1987 by Gallimard)
- Pétain, Paris, Fayard, 1987 (reedited in 1993 et 1994)
- Les Origines de la Perestroïka, Paris, Ramsay, 1990
- Nicolas II, Payot, Paris, 1991
- Questions sur la Deuxième Guerre mondiale, Paris, Casterman, 1993
- Histoire des colonisations, des conquêtes aux indépendances (XIIIe-XXe siècle), Paris, Le Seuil, 1994
- L'internationale, Paris, Editions Noêsis, 1996 ISBN 2-911606-02-7
- Que transmettre à nos enfants (with Philippe Jammet), Paris, Le Seuil, 2000
- Les Tabous de l'histoire, Paris, Nil, 2002
- Le Livre noir du colonialisme (director), Paris, Robert Laffont, 2003.
- Histoire de France, France Loisirs, 2002 (ISBN 978-2744151897)
- Le choc de l'Islam, Paris, Odile Jacob, 2003
- Le Cinéma, une vision de l'histoire, Paris, Le Chêne, 2003
- Les Tabous de L'Histoire, Pocket vol. 11949, NiL Éditions, Paris, 2004
- Les individus face aux crises du XXe siècle : L'Histoire anonyme, Paris, Odile Jacob, 2005
- Le ressentiment dans l' histoire. Odile Jacob, 2007. English (2010): Resentment in History, ISBN 978-0745646879 (paperback)
- Ils étaient sept hommes en guerre : Histoire parallèle, Robert Laffont, Paris, 2007.
- Autobiographie intellectuelle, Paris, Perrin, 2011
- La Vérité sur la tragédie des Romanov, Paris, Taillandier, 2012.
- Les Russes, l'esprit d'un peuple, Paris, Taillandier, 2017.
- L'Entrée dans la vie, Paris, Tallandier, 2020
