= Franklin Lafayette Riley Jr. =

Franklin Lafayette Riley Jr. (August 24, 1868 – November 10, 1929) was an American historian. The title of his dissertation was Colonial Origins of New England Senates. After receiving his doctorate from the Johns Hopkins University, he was appointed as the first Professor of History at Ole Miss. In his capacity as a professor at the University of Mississippi at Oxford, he helped to establish the Mississippi Historical Society and later the Mississippi Department of Archives and History. In 1902, he wrote a paper detailing the lineage of his grandfather, Edward Riley, and his descendants.

== Publications ==
- Publications of the Mississippi historical society Volume 10, editor 1898
