= Glenn Boyce =

American academic administrator

18th Chancellor of the University of Mississippi
- Incumbent
- Assumed office October 13, 2019
- Preceded by: Larry Sparks (acting)

7th President of Holmes Community College
- In office 2005 – June 30, 2014

Personal details
- Born: 1959 (age 66–67) Watkins Glen, New York, U.S.
- Spouse: Emily Boyce
- Children: 3
- Education: University of Mississippi (BA, EdD); Mississippi College (MEd)

Academic background
- Thesis: The perception of role delineation between Mississippi public school board presidents and superintendents (1996)
- Doctoral advisor: Ronald Partridge

Academic work
- Discipline: Education
- Institutions: University of Mississippi

Glenn Boyce is an American academic administrator. He is currently the chancellor of the University of Mississippi. Prior to working at the university, Boyce was commissioner of the Mississippi Institutions of Higher Learning from 2015 to 2018 and president of Holmes Community College. He has also coached football at three separate segregation academies, including Madison-Ridgeland Academy, Canton Academy and Tri-County Academy.

== History ==
Boyce was appointed chancellor of the University of Mississippi on October 13, 2019. He served as commissioner of the Mississippi Institutions of Higher Learning from 2015 to 2018 and president of Holmes Community College. In the 1980s and 1990s, Boyce worked for three "segregation academies:" Madison-Ridgeland Academy, Canton Academy, and Tri-County Academy. The University of Mississippi Foundation is responsible for paying Boyce a $500,000-a-year salary supplement. The university contributes $300,000 in state funds.

Boyce's hiring was especially controversial since Boyce had served as a consultant involved in the university's search for a new chancellor before taking the job himself. When the public announcement was made, some students, faculty, and alumni protested; they subsequently accused the university of trying to squelch the protests. Candidates for the position who were encouraged to apply by Boyce while he was a consultant for the search have also protested the decision to hire him. Investigative reporter Nick Judin of the Jackson Free Press alleged that the Mississippi Institutions of Higher Learning, an organization that Boyce chaired immediately prior to being appointed chancellor of the university, "may have been part of a long-planned scheme to install one of their own to lead the University of Mississippi."
