= Things That Fall from the Sky =

Book by Kevin Brockmeier

- First edition
- Author: Kevin Brockmeier
- Language: English
- Genre: Short stories
- Publisher: Pantheon Books
- Publication date: 2002
- Publication place: United States
- Media type: Print (hardback & paperback)
- Pages: 224 pp

Things That Fall from the Sky is a collection of eleven short stories by American author Kevin Brockmeier.

"These Hands" was selected for Prize Stories 2000: The O. Henry Awards, "The Ceiling" appeared in The O. Henry Prize Stories 2002 (First Prize), and "Space" appeared in The Best American Short Stories 2003.

== Stories ==
1. These Hands (first appeared in The Georgia Review)
2. Things That Fall from the Sky (first appeared in Crazyhorse)
3. Apples (first appeared in The Chicago Tribune)
4. A Day in the Life of Half of Rumpelstiltskin (first appeared in Writing on the Edge)
5. The Ceiling (first appeared in McSweeney's)
6. Small Degrees
7. The Jesus Stories
8. Space (first appeared in The Georgia Review)
9. The Passenger
10. The Light through the Window
11. The House at the End of the World
