= Kevin Brockmeier =

American writer (born 1972)

Kevin John Brockmeier
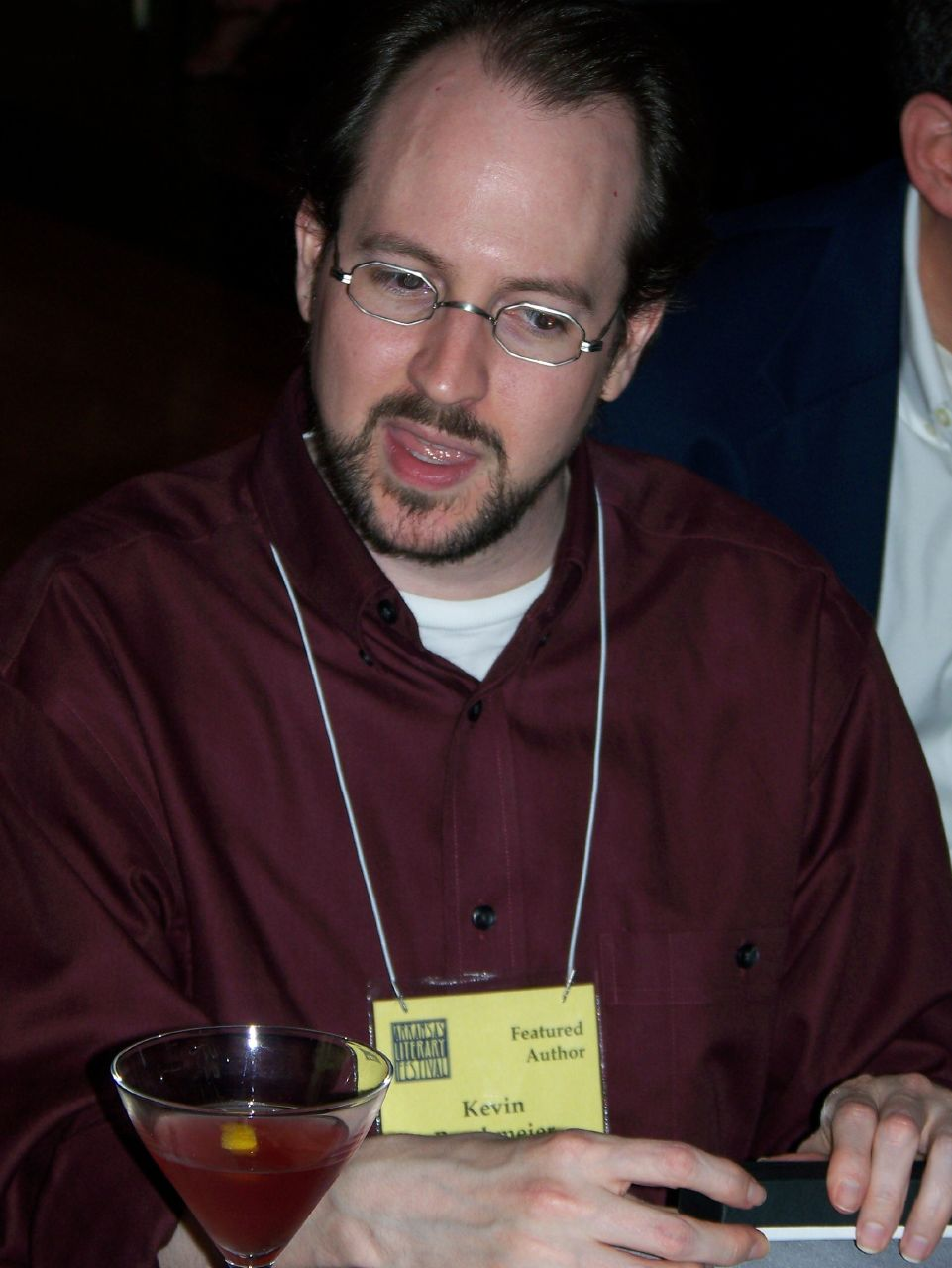
- Born: December 6, 1972 (age 53); Hialeah, Florida, U.S.
- Education: Parkview Arts and Science Magnet High School; Southwest Missouri State University; Iowa Writers' Workshop (MFA)
- Occupation: Author
- Writing career
- Notable works: Things That Fall from the Sky; The View From The Seventh Layer; The Brief History of the Dead

Kevin John Brockmeier (born December 6, 1972) is an American writer of fantasy and literary fiction. His best known work is the 2006 novel The Brief History of the Dead.

== Early life and education ==
Kevin John Brockmeier was born on December 6, 1972 in Hialeah, Florida, and raised in Little Rock, Arkansas.

He is a graduate of Parkview Arts and Science Magnet High School (1991) and Southwest Missouri State University (1995). He taught at the Iowa Writers' Workshop, where he received his MFA in 1997.

== Career ==
Brockmeier's short stories have been printed in numerous publications. He has published short story collections, children's novels, and fantasy novels.

== Awards and honors ==
Brockmeier has won three O. Henry Prizes, the Chicago Tribune's Nelson Algren Award for Short Fiction, Italo Calvino Short Fiction Award, the Booker Worthen Literary Prize, and the Porter Fund Literary Prize.

His awards include:

- O. Henry Award (2000 for the short story "These Hands" and 2002 for "The Ceiling")
- Nelson Algren Award
- Italo Calvino Short Fiction Award
- James Michener–Paul Engle Fellowship
- National Endowment for the Arts grant recipient

== Selected works ==
=== Story collections ===
- Things That Fall from the Sky (New York City: Pantheon Books, 2002, ISBN 0-375-42134-3)
- The View From The Seventh Layer (New York: Pantheon Books, 2008, ISBN 0-375-42530-6)
- The Ghost Variations (Penguin Random House, 2021, ISBN 9781524748838)

=== Novels ===
- The Truth About Celia (New York: Pantheon Books, 2003, ISBN 0-375-42135-1)
- The Brief History of the Dead (New York: Pantheon Books, 2006, ISBN 0-375-42369-9)
- The Illumination (New York: Pantheon Books, 2011, ISBN 0-375-42531-4)

=== Memoir ===
- A Few Seconds of Radiant Filmstrip: A Memoir of Seventh Grade (New York: Pantheon Books, 2014, ISBN 0-307-90898-4)

=== For younger readers ===
- City of Names (Viking, 2002)
- Grooves: A Kind of Mystery (New York: Katherine Tegen Books, 2006, ISBN 0-06-073691-7)

=== Miscellaneous stories ===
- "The Brief History of the Dead" (published in The New Yorker September 8, 2003; used as the first chapter of the novel by the same name)

For more information on individual stories, see Things That Fall from the Sky

=== Anthologies as editor ===
- Real Unreal: Best American Fantasy 3, edited by Kevin Brockmeier (Portland, Underland Press, scheduled January 2010, ISBN 978-0-9802260-8-9).
