= Lies Across America =

Book by James Loewen

Lies Across America: What Our Historic Markers and Monuments Get Wrong
- Author: James Loewen
- Language: English
- Publisher: New Press
- Publication date: 1999
- Publication place: United States
- Pages: 480
- ISBN: 0-684-87067-3
- Preceded by: Lies My Teacher Told Me

Lies Across America: What Our Historic Markers and Monuments Get Wrong is a 1999 book by James Loewen, is a sequel to his 1995 work Lies My Teacher Told Me. The book focuses on historical markers and museums across the United States, arguing that every historic site is "a tale of two eras": the one from when the event happened and the one from when the event was commemorated.

The survey starts on the West Coast and moves east, a deliberate break from the traditional American history found in textbooks, which begin with the Pilgrims and follow westward expansion. In the book, Loewen prioritized Native American history and the Spanish colonization of the Americas over that of other European colonization.

Loewen's book voices two major complaints about historical markers in the United States. The first deals with historical markers established in the Southern United States that attempt to whitewash the history of slavery and the period of Reconstruction. Many of these markers were established between 1890 and 1920, the nadir of American race relations. Most were placed by organizations with pro-Confederate agendas and reflect the racism of the early 20th century. While some markers have been altered in the last 40 years as a result of civil rights progress, many have not, especially those at American Civil War battle sites and in the South.

Loewen's second major complaint deals with the treatment of Native Americans, who are often neglected and omitted in the telling of American history. The author challenges and corrects many of the inaccurate and Eurocentric mistruths spread by historical markers across America.

At the end of his book, Loewen makes suggestions for how those concerned about the misrepresentation of history can change markers and monuments to convey historical truth and accuracy. The organizations running historical sites are faulted in Loewen's book according to Wilton Corkern.
