= The Mississippi Chinese =

1971 book by James W. Loewen

The Mississippi Chinese: Between Black and White is a non-fiction book by James W. Loewen, published by Harvard University Press in 1971. It is about Chinese Americans in the Mississippi Delta.

== Background ==
Loewen had asked survey subjects to fill out questionnaires and provide interviews.

== Contents ==
Loewen explained how the Chinese in the Mississippi Delta upgraded their standing in the racial hierarchy over time.

More than half of the content of the book concerns the era from the 1940s to 1971.

== Reception ==
Robert Blauner of the University of California, Berkeley described the book as "excellent on many counts." Blauner also praised the "excellent analysis of [the ethnic Chinese's] economic survival and prosperity".

Roger Daniels of the State University of New York, Fredonia wrote that the work is a "useful monograph" that describes things "intelligently" though he argued that the information on where the Mississippi Chinese came from is presented in a "less than satisfactory way".

George K. Hesslink of Pomona College described the book as "intriguing" with "unique data" and "more than occasional bursts of insight and fascinating analysis." Hesslink criticized how the work does not sufficiently use "theoretical context" in the structure of racial hierarchies, a "quite sketchy and, frankly, occasionally opaque" discourse on methodology, "inconsistent presentation of basic data", and often choosing to disregard "intellectual traditions from which the work stems."

Lucie Cheng Hirata of University of California, Los Angeles wrote that "the book is worth reading" and that Loewen did "an important service" due to opposing the idea that racism is a phenomenon of lower socioeconomic classes rather than higher socioeconomic classes. Hirata criticized some of the perceived "stereotypic notions and images about the Chinese."

== See also ==
- Lotus Among the Magnolias
