= The Most Southern Place on Earth =

The Most Southern Place on Earth: The Mississippi Delta and the Roots of Regional Identity is a nonfiction book by James C. Cobb, published in 1992 by Oxford University Press. It is about the Mississippi Delta region.

The author argues that while the white wealthy people had ended political opportunity of the African-Americans in the 1870s, the federal government has responsibility for those events as it did not prevent disenfranchisement.

== Content ==
The stories of black residents who opposed white control over society are in the later part of the book.

== Reception ==
Sydney Nathans of Duke University stated that the book is "vividly written, powerfully argued". In regards to the elite in the region, Nathans described the book's attitude as "sharply critical but humanly intimate."

Nell Irvin Painter, in The New York Times, described the book as "a lively, compassionate and disturbing book".
