= The Hardest Deal of All =

1870-1890 non-fiction book by Charles C. Bolton

The Hardest Deal of All: The Battle Over School Integration in Mississippi, 1870-1980 is a non-fiction book by Charles C. Bolton, published in 2005 by the University Press of Mississippi.

== Background ==
Documents from the Mississippi State Sovereignty Commission and oral histories were used as sources.

== Contents ==
The book presents information in historic sequence.

The establishment of a segregated schooling system in Mississippi is detailed in the first chapter. The white community's opposition to Brown v. Board of Education is detailed in the midpoint of the book.

== Reception ==
Hassan Kwame Jeffries of Ohio State University wrote that the work "succeeds in" explaining the effect discriminatory practices had on the state's government-operated K-12 education.
