= Lies My Teacher Told Me =

1995 book by sociologist James W. Loewen

Lies My Teacher Told Me: Everything Your American History Textbook Got Wrong
- Cover of the 1995 edition
- Author: James W. Loewen
- Language: English
- Subject: American history, historiography, Native American history, African-American history
- Publisher: The New Press
- Publication date: 1995
- Publication place: United States
- Pages: 383
- ISBN: 978-1-56584-100-0
- OCLC: 29877812
- Dewey Decimal: 973 20
- LC Class: E175.85 .L64 1995
- Followed by: Lies Across America: What Our Historic Sites Get Wrong

Lies My Teacher Told Me: Everything Your American History Textbook Got Wrong is a 1995 book by James W. Loewen critically examining twelve popular American high school history textbooks. In the book, Loewen concludes that the textbook authors propagate false, Eurocentric, and mythologized views of American history. In addition to his critique of the dominant historical themes presented in high school textbooks, Loewen presents themes from history that he believes should be presented in high school textbooks.

== Themes ==
In Lies My Teacher Told Me, Loewen criticizes modern American high school history textbooks for containing incorrect information about people and events such as Christopher Columbus, the lies and inaccuracies in the history books regarding the dealings between the Europeans and the Native Americans, and their often deceptive and inaccurate teachings told about America's commerce in slavery. He further criticizes the texts for a tendency to avoid controversy and for their bland and simplistic style. He proposes that when American history textbooks elevate American historical figures to the status of heroes, they unintentionally give students the impression that these figures are super-humans who live in the irretrievable past. Rather than highlighting both the positives and negatives of historical figures, Loewen argues that textbooks cause students to perceive these figures through a single lens. Loewen asserts that the muting of past clashes and tragedies makes history boring to students, especially groups excluded from the positive histories.

== Sources ==
The twelve textbooks Loewen examined for the first edition are:

- The American Adventure (Allyn & Bacon, 1975)
- American Adventures (Steck-Vaughn, 1987)
- American History (Harcourt Brace Jovanovich, 1982)
- The American Pageant (D. C. Heath and Company, 1991)
- The American Tradition (Charles E. Merrill Publishing, 1984)
- The American Way (Holt, Rinehart and Winston, 1979)
- The Challenge of Freedom (Glencoe, 1990)
- Discovering American History (Holt, Rinehart and Winston, 1974)
- Land of Promise (Scott, Foresman, 1983)
- Life and Liberty (Scott, Foresman, 1984)
- Triumph of the American Nation (Harcourt Brace Jovanovich, 1986)
- The United States: A History of the Republic (Prentice Hall, 1991)

In the second edition, Loewen added a newer edition of The American Pageant and five additional textbooks:

- The American Pageant (Houghton Mifflin, 2006)
- The American Journey (Glencoe/McGraw-Hill, 2000)
- The Americans (McDougal Littell, 2007)
- America: Pathways to the Present (Prentice Hall, 2005)
- A History of the United States (McDougal Littell, 2005)
- Holt American Nation (Holt, Rinehart, and Winston, 2003)

== Editions ==
There are three distinct editions of the book. For the original 1995 edition, Loewen examined twelve textbooks. For the 2007 edition, he revised the text to address five additional textbooks and a new edition of one of the earlier textbooks examined. The 2018 edition retains the same text as the 2007 edition, adding a new preface, "The age of alternative facts".

In April 2019, Loewen and Rebecca Stefoff, known for her adaptation of Howard Zinn's 1980 bestseller A People's History of the United States for young readers, made Lies My Teacher Told Me accessible for younger readers in Lies My Teacher Told Me: Young Readers Edition (The New Press, 2019).

In 2024 a comic version of Lies My Teacher Told Me: A Graphic Adaptation with drawings by Nate Powell was published by The New Press.

== Reception ==
Lies My Teacher Told Me is the winner of the 1996 American Book Award, the Oliver Cromwell Cox Award for Distinguished Anti-Racist Scholarship, and the Critics Choice Award of the American Educational Studies Association. Although well received by many, music scholar Jere T. Humphreys observes that Loewen's implicit bias may have caused him to fail to highlight some of the positive contributions made toward improving equality in the United States. For example, when referencing the civil rights movement, Loewen falls short in crediting the efforts of the U.S. legislative and executive branches in aiding throughout the civil rights struggle.

At least five academic reviews were published. James Giese, reviewing for The Journal of Southern History, notes that although Loewen "has done his homework" in analyzing the textbooks, 10 of 12 of the editions he used were a decade or so old, so even though many new editions make only trivial changes, he may be criticizing out-of-date editions. Claire Keller and Stanley Burstein wrote separate reviews for The History Teacher. Keller praises the work as "valuable" and recommends it as a useful addition to history teachers' libraries. She describes how, in his final two chapters, Loewen points to the causes for the distortions in the textbooks. Burstein notes that US history teaching would "benefit greatly from the sort of candor" about the past that Loewen advocates, but in several cases he finds the alternative evidence that Loewen musters scant or lacking, so that it is "better at identifying the deficiencies of the current situation that a proposing constructive alternatives." Reviewing for Contemporary Sociology, Sandra Wong compares Loewen's analysis to another critique of history textbooks that claims the opposite: that textbooks are too "progressive" in that they are so focused on "women and minorities" that they neglect "important white men." Ultimately she concludes that Lies My Teacher Told Me addresses a question transcending the content debates of the culture wars, in that it addresses the broader question of how to teach students "not so much what to think about the past, but how."

Looking back at the book five years later in The Journal of American History, Jonathan Zimmerman criticizes that journal for waiting five years to commission a review. He points out that Loewen's book appeared during the culture war against the attempt to create national standards for history education, and attributes the JAH's tardy review to the gap between historical scholarship and what "American citizens will allow." In 2003 Jere Humphreys reviewed it at length for the Journal of Historical Research in Music Education. In a long and detailed chapter by chapter description, Jere summarizes many of the specific cases Loewen addresses. He then points out a number of cases where Loewen's "fascinating read" contains inaccuracies (66-67). In conclusion he notes that historical music education suffers from similar problems as the history textbooks Loewen analyzes: a focus on institutional history without attending to the role of individual music educators or the "myriad and complex maze of social and economic factors" that influenced Americans to "sing, play instruments, and broaden their musical tastes."

== See also ==
- Lies Across America, a 1999 book on historical markers by the same author
- List of common misconceptions
- The Use and Abuse of History
