= James W. Loewen =

American sociologist, historian, and author (1942–2021)

- Born: James William Loewen; February 6, 1942; Decatur, Illinois, U.S.
- Died: August 19, 2021 (aged 79); Bethesda, Maryland, U.S.
- Other names: Jim Loewen, James Loewen
- Education: Harvard University (PhD); Carleton College; MacArthur High School (1960)
- Occupations: Historian, author, sociologist
- Organization(s): University of Vermont; The Catholic University of America
- Known for: Lies My Teacher Told Me (1995); Lies Across America (1999); Sundown Towns (2005); The Mississippi Chinese (1971)
- Relatives: Winifred (Gore) Loewen (mother); David F. Loewen (father)
- Website: justice.tougaloo.edu

James William Loewen (February 6, 1942 – August 19, 2021) was an American sociologist, historian, and author. He was best known for his 1995 book, Lies My Teacher Told Me: Everything Your American History Textbook Got Wrong. His 2005 book, Sundown Towns: A Hidden Dimension of American Racism, launched a national effort to develop a list of sundown towns.

== Early life, family and education ==
Loewen was born and raised in Decatur, Illinois. His father David was a medical director and physician from an immigrant Mennonite community; his mother, Winifred (Gore), was a librarian and teacher. Loewen was a National Merit Scholar, graduating from MacArthur High School in 1960.

He attended Carleton College. In 1963, as a junior, he spent a semester in Mississippi, an experience in a different culture that led him to question what he had been taught about United States history. He was intrigued by learning about the unique place of 19th-century Chinese immigrants and their descendants in Mississippi culture, commonly thought of as biracial. Loewen later earned a PhD in sociology from Harvard University based on his research on Chinese Americans in Mississippi.

== Career ==
Loewen first taught in Mississippi at Tougaloo College, a historically black college founded by the American Missionary Association after the American Civil War. Subsequently, he taught about racism for 20 years at the University of Vermont, where he was Professor of Sociology. Starting in 1997, he was a visiting professor of sociology at the Catholic University of America in Washington, D.C. He was selected for honoris causa membership in Omicron Delta Kappa in 1997 at SUNY Plattsburgh.

=== First Amendment battle ===
Loewen co-edited Mississippi: Conflict & Change (1974), a Mississippi history textbook with Charles Sallis. It won the Lillian Smith Book Award for Best Southern Nonfiction in 1975. However, it was rejected for use in Mississippi's public schools by the Mississippi Textbook Purchasing Board on the grounds that it was too controversial and it placed too much focus on racial matters.

Loewen challenged the board decision in a federal lawsuit, Loewen v. Turnipseed (1980) 488 F. Supp. 1138 (N.D. Miss.). Judge Orma R. Smith of the US District Court for the Northern District of Mississippi ruled that the rejection of the textbook was not based on "justifiable grounds" and that the authors were denied their right to free speech and press.

The American Library Association considers Loewen v. Turnipseed a historic First Amendment case and one of the foundations of the "right to read freely."

=== Lies My Teacher Told Me ===
External videos
- Booknotes interview with Louwen on Lies My Teacher Told Me, March 26, 1995, C-SPAN

Loewen spent two years at the Smithsonian Institution, where he studied and compared 12 American history textbooks then widely used throughout the US. He published his findings in Lies My Teacher Told Me: Everything Your American History Textbook Got Wrong (1995), which was republished in 2007 and 2018. He concluded that textbook authors propagate factually false, Eurocentric, and mythologized views of history. Loewen points out in the book that many of the distortions found in American history texts are "not even by the authors whose names grace the cover." In March 2012, the book's publisher, The New Press, listed Lies My Teacher Told Me as their top all-time bestseller. The book reflects Loewen's belief that history should not be taught as straightforward facts and dates to memorize, but rather as analysis of the context and root causes of events.

==== Lies My Teacher Told Me: Young Readers’ Edition ====
Rebecca Stefoff, known for her adaptation of Howard Zinn's bestseller A People's History of the United States for young readers, makes Lies My Teacher Told Me accessible for younger readers in Lies My Teacher Told Me: Young Readers Edition (2019).

=== Teaching What Really Happened ===
Loewen built on Lies My Teacher Told Me in Teaching What Really Happened: How to Avoid the Tyranny of Textbooks & Get Students Excited About Doing History (Teachers College Press, 2009). The first four chapters lay out an argument for how history should be taught at the elementary and secondary levels, while chapters 5–10 address teaching specific issues in history.

=== Sundown Towns ===
External videos
- Presentation by Loewen on Sundown Towns, October 23, 2005, C-SPAN

Continuing his interest in racism in the United States, Loewen wrote Sundown Towns: A Hidden Dimension of American Racism, which was released in 2005. The book documents the histories of sundown towns, which are towns where African Americans, Jews, and other minority groups were forced (or strongly encouraged) to leave before sundown to avoid racist violence by the towns' white residents.

Loewen wrote about sundown towns throughout his career, including in Lies Across America, in which he called the affluent suburb of Darien, Connecticut, a modern-day de facto sundown town.

Sundown Towns won the Gustavus Myers Outstanding Book Award. It also gained excellent reviews in Publishers Weekly and Booklist. The book inspired a nationwide online initiative to monitor and list sundown towns across the USA. A review in The Washington Post argued that even though Loewen dedicated an entire chapter to research methodology, his statements regarding the number of communities that supported racial exclusion policies were widely variable and vague. "This vagueness, along with Loewen's almost evangelical passion for his material, raises questions of credibility — or at least of potential overstatement."

=== Later writings ===
In 2010, Loewen and Edward H. Sebesta co-wrote the book The Confederate and Neo-Confederate Reader: The Great Truth about the Lost Cause, an anthology containing a wide array of primary source documents pertaining to the Confederacy from the time of the American Civil War.

Loewen also wrote an opera libretto on the subject entitled, The Liberation of Richmond, set in Richmond, Virginia, in April 1865, as Confederate rule in the city came to an end. The overture was composed by Samuel Murchison Seka. Loewen also wrote an alternative ending to the opera, published on his website.

Loewen's last published book, Up a Creek, With a Paddle: Tales of Canoeing and Life, is a memoir in which he returned to his life's work and addressed the origins of racism and inequality, the theory of history, and the ties between the two.

Before his death, Loewen began researching for a new book, Surprises on the Landscape: Unexpected Places That Get History Right. The book was planned as a follow-up to Lies Across America, which noted historically inaccurate or misleading historical markers and sites across the US. Surprises was planned to call attention to historical sites that are accurate and provide honest representations of events. Loewen's website invited the public to comment on what towns and historical sites should be included in terms of presenting history right.

== Personal life ==
Loewen married his first wife, Patricia Hanrahan, in 1968. Together, they had two children. They divorced in 1975. In 2006, he married Susan Robertson, and they remained married until his death.

Loewen died on August 19, 2021, at Suburban Hospital in Bethesda, Maryland. He was 79, and had been diagnosed with Stage IV bladder cancer two years prior to his death.

== Bibliography ==
Loewen has published the following works:

- Loewen, James W. (1971). The Mississippi Chinese: Between Black and White (second ed.). Cambridge: Harvard University Press. ISBN 978-0-674-57660-5.
- Loewen, James W.; Sallis, Charles, eds. (1974). Mississippi: Conflict & Change. New York: Pantheon Books. ISBN 978-0-394-48964-3.
- Loewen, James W. (1982). Social Science in the Courtroom. Lexington: D.C. Heath and Company.
- Loewen, James W. (1992). The Truth About Columbus. New Press. ISBN 978-1-56584-008-9.
- Loewen, James W. (1995). Lies My Teacher Told Me: Everything Your High School History Textbook Got Wrong. New York: The New Press. ISBN 978-1-56584-100-0.
- Loewen, James W. (1999). Lies Across America: What Our Historic Markers and Monuments Get Wrong. New York: The New Press. ISBN 978-0-684-87067-0.
- Loewen, James W. (2005). Sundown Towns. New York: The New Press. ISBN 156584887X.
- Loewen, James W. (2010). Teaching What Really Happened: How to Avoid the Tyranny of Textbooks and Get Students Excited About Doing History. New York: Teachers College Press. ISBN 978-0-8077-5948-6.
- Loewen, James W.; Sebesta, Edward H. (2010). The Confederate and Neo-Confederate Reader: The "Great Truth" about the "Lost Cause". Jackson, Mississippi: University Press of Mississippi. ISBN 978-1-60473-218-4.
- Loewen, James W. (February 26, 2011). "Five myths about why the South seceded". The Washington Post.
- Loewen, James W.; Stefoff, Rebecca (2019). Lies My Teacher Told Me: Young Readers' Edition. New York: The New Press. ISBN 978-1-62097-469-8.
- Loewen, James W. (2020). Up a Creek, With a Paddle: Tales of Canoeing and Life. Oakland, California: PM Press. ISBN 978-1-62963-827-0.
