= Waddell (surname) =

Waddell is a surname of Scottish origin. Notable people with the name include:

- Alan Waddell (1914–2008), Australian walker
- Alexander Waddell (1789–1827), Scottish astronomer and meteorologist
- Alexander Nicol Anton Waddell (1913–1999), British colonial administrator and governor
- Alfred Waddell (physician) (1896–1953), Trinidadian physician and civil rights activist
- Alfred Moore Waddell (1834–1912), American politician
- Angus Waddell (born 1964), Australian swimmer
- Barry Waddell (born 1936), Australian cyclist
- Bobby Waddell (1939–2021), Scottish footballer
- Brandon Waddell (born 1994), American baseball player
- Cheryl Boyd-Waddell (1952–2002), American opera singer
- Chris Waddell (born 1968), American Paralympic alpine skier
- Coslett Herbert Waddell (1858–1918), Irish clergyman and botanist
- Craig Waddell (born 1995), Scottish curler
- Don Waddell (born 1958), American hockey player and executive
- Ernest Waddell (born 1986), American actor
- George Waddell (footballer) (1888–1966), Scottish footballer
- George Waddell (figure skater) (born 1998), British-Canadian ice dancer
- Gordon Waddell (1937–2012), Scottish rugby union player and South African politician
- Helen Waddell (1889 – 1965), Irish poet, translator and playwright
- Herbert Waddell (1902–1988), Scottish rugby union footballer
- Hope Masterton Waddell, missionary
- Hugh Waddell (disambiguation)
- Ian Waddell (1942–2021), Canadian politician
- Ian Waddell (footballer), Scottish footballer
- James Waddell (disambiguation), multiple people
- Jason Waddell (born 1981), American baseball player
- Jessie Waddell (1892–1975), Trinidadian-American musician and performer
- Jimmy Waddell (born c. 1937), Scottish curler, European champion
- John Waddell (disambiguation), multiple people
- Justine Waddell (born 1976), South African actress
- Kyle Waddell (born 1993), Scottish curler
- Laurence Waddell (1854–1938), British explorer and author
- Leila Waddell (1880–1932), American writer, magician, and musician
- Martin Waddell (born 1941), Irish children's author
- Moses Waddel (1770–1840), American educator
- Peter Hately Waddell (1817–1891), Scottish cleric
- R. Bruce Waddell (1914–1979), American businessman and politician
- Ricky L. Waddell (born 1959), major general, US Army Reserve
- Rob Waddell (born 1975), New Zealand rower, yachtsman, and rugby player
- Rube Waddell (1876–1914), American baseball player
- Sid Waddell (1940–2012), British commentator and television personality
- Simone Waddell (born 1975), Australian jazz singer
- Sonia Waddell (born 1973), New Zealand rower
- Stacy Lynn Waddell (born 1966), American artist
- Steve Waddell (1966−2012), Australian former professional rugby league footballer
- Terrie Waddell, Australian actress
- Thomas Waddell (1854–1940), Australian politician
- Tom Waddell (baseball) (1958–2019), Scottish baseball player
- Walter H. Waddell, retired ExxonMobil Chemical senior research associate and consultant
- William Waddell (disambiguation), multiple people
- Winifred Waddell (1884–1972), English-born Australian botanist
- Zane Waddell (born 1998), South African swimmer
