= Waddel =

Waddel is a surname. Notable people with the surname include:

- James Waddel (1739–1805), Irish American Presbyterian preacher from Virginia
- James Waddel Alexander (1804–1859), American Presbyterian minister and theologian
- John Newton Waddel, Chancellor of the University of Mississippi from 1865 to 1874
- Moses Waddel (1770–1840), American educator and minister in antebellum Georgia and South Carolina
- Nancy Mann Waddel Woodrow (c. 1867–1935), American writer
- William Garner Waddel (1870–1937), American attorney, politician, and inventor

== See also ==
- Hope Waddel Training Institute
- Waddel Mansion
- Waddell House (disambiguation)
- Twaddell (disambiguation)
- Waddell (disambiguation)
- Weddell (disambiguation)
