= List of shipwrecks in June 1865 =

The list of shipwrecks in June 1865 includes ships sunk, foundered, grounded, or otherwise lost during June 1865.

== 1 June ==
List of shipwrecks: 1 June 1865
Ship	State	Description
Alemania	United Kingdom	The steamship was wrecked in the Magdalena River.
Anna Andrina	Flag unknown	The ship was driven ashore at Narva, Russia. Her crew were rescued.
Carron	United Kingdom	The brig was wrecked near Gothenburg, Sweden. Her crew were rescued. She was on a voyage from South Shields, County Durham to a Baltic port.
Cornelia Berendina	Netherlands	The schooner was wrecked on Neckman's Ground, in the Baltic Sea. Her crew were rescued. She was on a voyage from South Shields, County Durham to Saint Petersburg, Russia.
Crinoline	United Kingdom	The ship was driven ashore at Pärnu, Russia.
Edla	Flag unknown	The ship was wrecked at Helsinki, Grand Duchy of Finland.
Elizabeth Machtelina	Flag unknown	The ship was driven ashore on Læsø, Denmark.
Elizabeth Sophia	United Kingdom	The ship was driven ashore near Pärnu.
Fortuna	Flag unknown	The ship was driven ashore at Narva. Her crew were rescued.
Grace Darling	(United Kingdom of Great Britain and Ireland) New Zealand	The schooner grounded on a rocky reef at the mouth of Nelson Harbour in a heavy swell. The ship's whole port side was heavily damaged, and passengers and crew were taken off by a pilot boat.
Gratitude	United Kingdom	The ship foundered in the Baltic Sea with the loss of all hands. She was on a voyage from Newcastle upon Tyne to Kronstadt.
Great Britain	United Kingdom	The brig was driven ashore and wrecked at Sunderland, County Durham. Her crew were rescued. She was on a voyage from Sunderland to Kronstadt, Russia.
Industrie	United Kingdom	The ship was driven ashore near Pärnu.
Irene	Denmark	The schooner was driven ashore and wrecked on Læsø. She was on a voyage from Newcastle upon Tyne to Korsør
Joseph	United Kingdom	The ship was wrecked at the Dagerort Lighthouse, Russia. Her crew were rescued by Minerva (United Kingdom). Joseph was on a voyage from Liverpool, Lancashire to Saint Petersburg, Russia.
Kentucky	United States	Carrying 800 paroled former Confederate soldiers, the 375-ton sidewheel paddle steamer struck a snag and sank in the Red River of the South between its mouth and Alexandria, Louisiana, the ship′s boiler exploding as she sank. Thirty of the former Confederate soldiers died.
Leonore	United Kingdom	The ship was wrecked near Torekov, Sweden.
Lochrimmer	United Kingdom	The ship was driven ashore at Narva. Her crew were rescued.
Ludwig Maria	Norway	The brig was driven ashore at Narva with the loss of all hands.
Mary Holland	United Kingdom	The ship was driven ashore near Pärnu.
Minerva	Flag unknown	The ship was driven ashore at Narva. Her crew were rescued.
Mystery	United Kingdom	The ship was wrecked near Torekov. She was on a voyage from Königsberg, Prussia to Montrose, Forfarshire.
Oscar	United Kingdom	The ship was wrecked near Lysekil, Sweden with the loss of all but two of her crew.
Paradies	United Kingdom	The ship was driven ashore near Pärnu.
Praesto	flag unknown	The ship was driven ashore on Læsø.
Queen	United Kingdom	The brig was wrecked in the Kattegat near Gothenburg with the loss of all eight crew. She was on a voyage from Hartlepool, County Durham to Kronstadt.
Recovery	United Kingdom	The brig was driven ashore and wrecked at "Backstadt", Sweden. Her crew were rescued. She was on a voyage from South Shields to a Baltic port.
Royal Standard	United Kingdom	The ship ran aground on Læsø, Denmark and sank. Her crew were rescued. She was on a voyage from Sunderland, County Durham to Kronstadt, Russia.
Swan	United Kingdom	The ship was wrecked at Helsinki.

== 2 June ==
List of shipwrecks: 22 June 1865
Ship	State	Description
George	United Kingdom	The ship ran aground on the Goodwin Sands, Kent and sank. A search by the Ramsgate Lifeboat and by the North Deal Lifeboat Vankook ( Royal National Lifeboat Institution) failed to find any trace of her crew.
Providence	United Kingdom	The ship was driven ashore on Lundy Island, Devon. She was on a voyage from Newport, Monmouthshire to Southampton, Hampshire. She was refloated and found to be severely leaky.

== 3 June ==
List of shipwrecks: 3 June 1865
Ship	State	Description
Tucker	United Kingdom	The brig foundered 2 nautical miles (3.7 km) off Fredrikshavn, Denmark.

== 4 June ==
List of shipwrecks: 4 June 1865
Ship	State	Description
Emile	Belgium	The fishing vessel sprang a leak and sank in the North Sea 16 nautical miles (30 km) east of St. Abbs Head, Berwickshire, United Kingdom. Her crew survived.
Jane Williams	(United Kingdom of Great Britain and Ireland) New Zealand	The cutter went aground on the bar at the mouth of the Hokitika River. She lost her rudder and was driven onto the bar by a heavy sea.

== 5 June ==
List of shipwrecks: 5 June 1865
Ship	State	Description
Her Majesty	United Kingdom	The ship ran aground on the Macrafulla Lumps, in the Hooghly River and was wrecked. She was on a voyage from Liverpool, Lancashire to Calcutta, India.

== 6 June ==
List of shipwrecks: 6 June 1865
Ship	State	Description
Eclipse	(United Kingdom of Great Britain and Ireland) New South Wales	The 97-ton schooner went aground on a reef near New Plymouth in a northerly gale. Passengers and crew were safely rescued.
Hibernia	United Kingdom	The ship ran aground at Liverpool, Lancashire. She was on a voyage from New York, United States to Liverpool. She was refloated.
Unidentified torpedo boat	Confederate States Navy	The David-type torpedo boat was lost off Cape Hatteras, North Carolina, during a storm while being transported by the sidewheel gunboat USS Mingoe (United States Navy).

== 7 June ==
List of shipwrecks: 7 June 1865
Ship	State	Description
Francis I	France	The brig ran aground on the Longsand, in the North Sea off the coast of Essex, United Kingdom. She was on a voyage from Middlesbrough, Yorkshire, United Kingdom to Bayonne, Basses-Pyrénées.

== 8 June ==
List of shipwrecks: 8 June 1865
Ship	State	Description
Admiral Du Pont	United States	En route from New York to Fort Monroe, Virginia, with a cargo of United States Government supplies, the 750-ton sidewheel paddle steamer sank in the North Atlantic Ocean off Cape May, New Jersey, with the loss of fifteen to twenty crew after colliding with Stadacona (United Kingdom).
Courier	France	The ship ran aground on the Haisborough Sands, in the North Sea off the coast of Norfolk, United Kingdom. She was on a voyage from Christiania, Norway to Dunkirk, Nord.
Lizzie	United Kingdom	The steamship foundered off in the Strait of Florida off Brange Cave. Her crew took to three boats. Those in one of the boats were rescued by a Spanish brig, the rest were rescued by the barque Leopoldine Fraude (Prussia). Lizzie was on a voyage from Havana, Cuba to London.
Stadacona	United Kingdom	The ship collided with Admiral Du Pont (United States and was beached on "Athentucket Island", New Jersey. She was on a voyage from Philadelphia, Pennsylvania, United States to Saint John, New Brunswick, British North America.
Steam Launch No. 3	United States	The steam launch was wrecked off the coast of South Carolina on the Saint Helena Shoals.

== 10 June ==
List of shipwrecks: 10 June 1865
Ship	State	Description
Duchess	United Kingdom	The ship ran aground in the Dardanelles. She was on a voyage from Alexandria, Egypt to Constantinople, Ottoman Empire. She was refloated on 12 June and taken in to Constantinople.

== 11 June ==
List of shipwrecks: 11 June 1865
Ship	State	Description
Catherine	United Kingdom	The sloop was abandoned in the Irish Sea. Her four crew were rescued by a tug and the Rhyl Lifeboat.
Express	United States	During a voyage from Parkersburg, West Virginia, to Louisville, Kentucky, with the 32nd Illinois Infantry Regiment (Union Army) on board, the 224-ton sidewheel paddle steamer sank in the Ohio River near Manchester, Ohio. She later was refloated and returned to service.
ARP Jejuy	Paraguayan Navy	Jejuy The steamship Paraguayan War, Battle of Riachuelo: The steamship was rammed by Amazonas Imperial Brazilian Navy) and sank in the Paraná River.
Jequitinhonha	Imperial Brazilian Navy	Paraguayan War, Battle of Riachuelo: The corvette ran aground in the Paraná river. She was abandoned the next day and captured by the Paraguayans.
ARP Marquês de Olinda	Paraguayan Navy	Paraguayan War, Battle of Riachuelo: The steamship ran aground in the Paraná river and was abandoned by her crew.
ARP Salto	Paraguayan Navy	Paraguayan War, Battle of Riachuelo: The steamship was sunk in the Paraná River by Amazonas (Imperial Brazilian Navy).
West Kent	United Kingdom	The ship foundered in the North Sea. She was on a voyage from Alnmouth, Northumberland to the River Thames.

== 12 June ==
List of shipwrecks: 12 June 1865
Ship	State	Description
Bob Mills	United States	The 34-ton screw steamer exploded, probably on Lake Erie.
Lady Dennison	(United Kingdom of Great Britain and Ireland) New Zealand	The brig went ashore at the entrance to the Whanganui River when her towline parted while she was being guided over the river's sandbar.

== 13 June ==
List of shipwrecks: 13 June 1865
Ship	State	Description
Echo	France	The mail steamship was wrecked on a rock off Romania Point, the south-eastern tip of the Malay Peninsula; crew and some cargo saved. She was on a voyage from Singapore to Saigon.
Juno	(United Kingdom of Great Britain and Ireland) New Zealand	The 50-ton ketch was wrecked at Hokitika, where she had travelled from Lyttelton.

== 14 June ==
List of shipwrecks: 14 June 1865
Ship	State	Description
Alabama	United States	The 337-ton whaling barque went aground at Port Hutt in New Zealand's Chatham Islands. She had sheltered in the port to escape a violent southerly storm, but dragged her anchor. Despite cutting way masts to reduce danger to the ship, she was repeatedly dashed into rocks and was extensively holed. All hands were saved.

== 15 June ==
List of shipwrecks: 15 June 1865
Ship	State	Description
Edward F. Dix	United States	The 296-ton sidewheel paddle steamer struck the wreck of the ironclad ram USS Eastport (United States Navy) in the Red River of the South in Louisiana and sank on top of the wreck.
Kate Blackstone, or Kate Blackiston	United States	Carrying a cargo of general merchandise, the schooner sank in the Sacramento River at the foot of I Street in Sacramento, California, with the loss of two crewmen. One crewman survived.
Orizaba	United States	The 630-bulk ton full-rigged ship was wrecked on the Trinity River at Liberty, Texas.

== 16 June ==
List of shipwrecks: 16 June 1865
Ship	State	Description
Admiral Kassakewitch	Russia	The ship ran aground on the Wostock Reef, in Castries Bay and was severely damaged. She was on a voyage from Bremen to Nicolaieff.
Jane	United Kingdom	The ship was wrecked off Nuevitas, Captaincy General of Cuba. She was on a voyage from Havana to Manzanilla, Cuba.

== 17 June ==
List of shipwrecks: 17 June 1865
Ship	State	Description
Louis Leonide	United Kingdom	The ship was wrecked at the mouth of the Goatzacoalcos River, Mexico.

== 18 June ==
List of shipwrecks: 18 June 1865
Ship	State	Description
Eastern Province	(United Kingdom of Great Britain and Ireland) Cape Colony	The steamship was wrecked 18 nautical miles (33 km) from Cape L'Agulhas. All on board survived. She was on a voyage from Algoa Bay to Table Bay.

== 19 June ==
List of shipwrecks: 19 June 1865
Ship	State	Description
Derwent	United Kingdom	The steamship was wrecked on Gray Island, South Uist, Outer Hebrides. Her ten crew survived.
Emily Reinhold	United Kingdom	The ship departed from Montevideo, Uruguay for Liverpool, Lancashire. No further trace, presumed foundered with the loss of all hands.
M. Fannie Stafford	United States	The 42-ton screw steamer was wrecked by an explosion at Chicago, Illinois.

== 20 June ==
List of shipwrecks: 20 June 1865
Ship	State	Description
Emma	United States	The 189-ton sternwheel paddle steamer struck a snag and sank in the Red River of the South at Shreveport, Louisiana.
Fleetwood	United Kingdom	The barque was wrecked off Dassen Island. All on board survived. She was on a voyage from Glasgow, Renfrewshire to Mauritius.
James Dunn	United Kingdom	The ship collided with Syrian (United Kingdom) and foundered in the Bristol Channel 20 nautical miles (37 km) south west of Lundy Island, Devon. Her crew were rescued by Syrian.
Kentucky	United States	The steamboat ran aground in the Red River of the South near Shreveport, on or about 20 June while carrying a large number of Confederate soldiers. Not believed to be in danger, she was not evacuated. She sank that night with the loss of approximately 200 lives. Her wreck was rediscovered in 1994.

== 21 June ==
List of shipwrecks: 21 June 1865
Ship	State	Description
Pacific	(United Kingdom of Great Britain and Ireland) Victoria	The schooner was wrecked at the mouth of the Manning River. Her crew were rescued.

== 22 June ==
List of shipwrecks: 22 June 1865
Ship	State	Description
Euphrates	United States	American Civil War: The whaler, a 364-ton full-rigged ship, was captured and burned in the Bering Sea near 62°23′N 179°46′E by the merchant raider CSS Shenandoah (Confederate States Navy).
Jireh Swift	United States	American Civil War: The whaler, a 428-ton barque, was captured and burned in the Bering Sea by the merchant raider CSS Shenandoah (Confederate States Navy).
Leesburg	United States	The steamer, partially loaded with a cargo of cotton, struck a snag and sank with the loss of two lives in the Savannah River in Georgia.
Sophia Thornton	United States	American Civil War: The whaler, a 426-ton full-rigged ship, was captured and burned in the Bering Sea at 62°40′N 178°50′W by the merchant raider CSS Shenandoah (Confederate States Navy).
William Thompson	United States	American Civil War: The whaler, a 495-ton full-rigged ship, was captured and burned in the Bering Sea northeast of Cape Narrows by the merchant raider CSS Shenandoah (Confederate States Navy).

== 23 June ==
List of shipwrecks: 23 June 1865
Ship	State	Description
Susan & Abigail	United States	American Civil War: The 159-ton brig was captured and burned in the Bering Sea at 62°48′N 179°04′W by the merchant raider CSS Shenandoah (Confederate States Navy).

== 24 June ==
List of shipwrecks: 24 June 1865
Ship	State	Description
Hamburg	Hamburg	The steamship was driven ashore at Rosetta, Egypt. She was on a voyage from Havre de Grâce, Seine-Inférieure, France to Port Said, Egypt.

== 25 June ==
List of shipwrecks: 25 June 1865
Ship	State	Description
Arrow	(United Kingdom of Great Britain and Ireland) New South Wales	The schooner was wrecked on King's Island, Queensland. She was on a voyage from Mauritius to Sydney.
General Williams	United States	American Civil War: The whaler, a 419-ton full-rigged ship, was captured and burned in the Bering Sea near St. Lawrence Island by the merchant raider CSS Shenandoah (Confederate States Navy).
Ruby	(United Kingdom of Great Britain and Ireland) New Zealand	The 86-ton steamer was thrown onto the bar at the mouth of the Hokitika River in a heavy swell and was wrecked. Some contemporary reports suggest that she may have been refloated.

== 26 June ==
List of shipwrecks: 26 June 1865
Ship	State	Description
Behera	United Kingdom	The steamship ran aground at Alexandria, Egypt. She was refloated.
Catherine	United States	American Civil War: The whaler, a 384- or 385-ton bark, was captured and burned in the Bering Sea by the merchant raider CSS Shenandoah (Confederate States Navy).
Gipsy, or Gipsey	United States	American Civil War: The whaler, a 360-ton bark, was captured and burned in the Bering Sea by the merchant raider CSS Shenandoah (Confederate States Navy).
Gratitude	United States	The 337-ton whaling barque was stove in by ice and lost 40 nautical miles (74 km) from Cape Lisburne, Russian America.
Isabella	United States	American Civil War: The whaler, a 315-ton barque, was captured and burned in the Bering Sea by the merchant raider CSS Shenandoah (Confederate States Navy).
Nimrod	United States	American Civil War: The whaler, a 340-ton barque, was captured and burned in the Bering Sea by the merchant raider CSS Shenandoah (Confederate States Navy).
William C. Nye	United States	American Civil War: The whaler, a 389-ton barque, was captured and burned in the Bering Sea by the merchant raider CSS Shenandoah (Confederate States Navy).
William Nelson	United States	The full-rigged ship was destroyed by fire in the Atlantic Ocean (41°20′N 42°20′W) with the loss of about 400 of the 478 people on board. Around 80 survivors were rescued by the steamship Lafayette, by Mercury (both France), and by the barque Ilmari (Russia). William Nelson was on a voyage from Antwerp, Belgium to New York.

== 27 June ==
List of shipwrecks: 27 June 1865
Ship	State	Description
Esther	(United Kingdom of Great Britain and Ireland) New Zealand	The 76-ton schooner was wrecked at Hokitika when she struck the bar at the mouth of the Hokitika River, where she had travelled from Sydney.
Sir Francis Drake	United Kingdom	The 188-ton three-masted schooner was wrecked at Hokitika when she struck the bar at the mouth of the Hokitika River. She was beached and broke up.

== 28 June ==
List of shipwrecks: 28 June 1865
Ship	State	Description
Brunswick	United States	American Civil War: The whaler, a 295-ton full-rigged ship, was captured and burned in the Bering Strait by the merchant raider CSS Shenandoah (Confederate States Navy).
Congress	United States	American Civil War: The whaler, a 376-ton barque, was captured and burned in the Bering Strait by the merchant raider CSS Shenandoah (Confederate States Navy).
Covington	United States	American Civil War: The whaler, a 350-ton barque, was captured and burned in the Bering Strait by the merchant raider CSS Shenandoah (Confederate States Navy).
Favorite	United States	American Civil War: The whaler, a 295-ton barque, was captured and burned in the Bering Strait by the merchant raider CSS Shenandoah (Confederate States Navy).
Hillman	United States	American Civil War: The whaler, a barque, was captured and burned in the Bering Strait by the merchant raider CSS Shenandoah (Confederate States Navy).
Illinois	United States	The 530-ton screw steamer sank in Lake Erie after colliding with Dean Richmond (Flag unknown) near Point Pelee, Ontario.
Isaac Howland	United States	American Civil War: The whaler, a 399-ton full-rigged ship, was captured and burned in the Bering Strait by the merchant raider CSS Shenandoah (Confederate States Navy).
J. P. Wheeler	United States	The ship was driven ashore in the James River. She was on a voyage from Bermuda to Havre de Grâce, Seine-Inférieure, France. She was refloated on 1 July.
Martha	United States	American Civil War: The whaler, a 360-ton barque, was captured and burned in the Bering Strait by the merchant raider CSS Shenandoah (Confederate States Navy).
Nassau	United States	American Civil War: The whaler, a 408-ton full-rigged ship, was captured and burned in the Bering Strait by the merchant raider CSS Shenandoah (Confederate States Navy).
Olive	United States	The 220-ton sternwheel paddle steamer struck a snag in the Ohio River at Golconda, Illinois, and sank with the loss of seven lives.
Waverley	United States	American Civil War: The whaler, a 327-ton barque, was captured and burned in the Bering Sea near the Diomede Islands by the merchant raider CSS Shenandoah (Confederate States Navy).

== 29 June ==
List of shipwrecks: 29 June 1865
Ship	State	Description
Chanticleer	United Kingdom	The steamship foundered in the South China Sea in a typhoon with the loss of all on board. She was on a voyage from Hong Kong to Foochow, China.
Coniston	United Kingdom	The barque foundered in the South China Sea in a typhoon with the loss of all on board. She was on a voyage from Hong Kong to Swatow, China.
Corea	United Kingdom	The steamship foundered in the South China Sea in a typhoon with the loss of all 103 people on board. She was on a voyage from Hong Kong to Foochow.
Nubia	Grand Duchy of Oldenburg	The barque was captured by pirates and burnt in the South China Sea off Hainan, China. Her crew were rescued by the barque Atalanta (Hamburg).
Robert and Ann	United Kingdom	The ship was abandoned in the Baltic Sea off Hogland, Russia. She was on a voyage from Hartlepool, County Durham to Kronstadt, Russia.

== 30 June ==
List of shipwrecks: 30 June 1865
Ship	State	Description
Edith	United Kingdom	The full-rigged ship was driven in to the full-rigged ship Hollandia (Netherlands) and the barque Oceanica (United Kingdom) and was severely damaged at Hong Kong.
Emma Jane	United Kingdom	The brig sprang a leak and foundered in the North Sea off Cromer, Norfolk. Her crew were rescued by the schooner Alfred ( (United Kingdom of Great Britain and Ireland) Guernsey). Emma Jane was on a voyage from Middlesbrough, Yorkshire to Genoa, Italy.
Johnson	United Kingdom	The schooner was wrecked at Bude, Cornwall. Her four crew were rescued by the Bude Lifeboat.
Richard	United Kingdom	The barque was driven ashore at Kowloon, China.

== Unknown date ==
List of shipwrecks: Unknown date in June 1865
Ship	State	Description
Benjamin Delano	United States	Carrying a cargo of forage, the brig was driven ashore at Galveston, Texas, during a three-day gale.
USS Bloomer	United States Navy	The sternwheel paddle steamer sank in East Pass off Santa Rosa Island, Florida. She was raised and repaired.
Echo No. 2	United States	Carrying 300 soldiers of the 13th and 41st Ohio Veteran Volunteer Regiments, the sternwheel paddle steamer sank in the Ohio River near Cairo, Illinois, in late June after striking the prow of the screw sloop-of-war USS Oneida (United States Navy). The regiments lost rations and a combined 10 horses and 13 mules. The soldiers blamed the pilot guiding Echo No. 2 for the accident and beat him.
Frederick August	United Kingdom	The ship ran aground near Hellevoetsluis, Zeeland, Netherlands.
Goldfinder	Siam	The barque foundered in the South China Sea.
Mischief	United Kingdom	The barque was lost off Amoy, China before 15 June.
Pine Hill	United States	The sternwheel paddle steamer struck a snag and sank in the Red River of the South at Tucker's Bar in Louisiana.
Recovery	United Kingdom	The brig foundered in the North Sea. She came ashore at Newcastle upon Tyne, Northumberland and was wrecked.
Robert Finnie	United Kingdom	The ship was lost in the White Sea. Her crew were rescued.
Stettin	Stettin	The steamship was driven ashore near Stettin. She was on a voyage from Leith, Lothian, United Kingdom to Stettin.
