= Waddell =

Waddell may refer to:

== Places ==
- Waddell, Arizona
  - New Waddell Dam, on the Agua Fria River
- Waddell Barnes Botanical Gardens, Macon, Georgia
- Waddell Creek, a stream in California
- E. E. Waddell Language Academy, Charlotte, North Carolina
- Waddells Mill Pond Site, an archeological site in Florida
- Waddell's Station, a historic site in Oklahoma

== Other uses ==
- Waddell (surname), including a list of people with the name
- Russell, Majors and Waddell, a partnership that operated the Pony Express
- USS Waddell (DDG-24), a United States Navy vessel
- Waddell and Reed, a mutual fund company
- Waddell (Limited), owners of Dazed & Confused (magazine)
- Waddell's signs, medical terminology related to back pain
