= Greek ship Nearchos =

At least two ships of the Hellenic Navy have borne the name Nearchos (Greek: Νέαρχος) after the ancient Cretan admiral Nearchus:

- Greek destroyer Nearchos (D65), a Fletcher-class destroyer launched in 1943 as USS Wadsworth and transferred to Germany in 1959 as Z-3. She was transferred to Greece and renamed Nearchos in 1980 serving until scrapping in 1991.
- Greek destroyer Nearchos (D219), a Charles F. Adams-class destroyer launched in 1963 as USS Waddell she was transferred to Greece in 1992 and renamed. She was sunk as a target in 2006.
- Greek frigate Nearchos, a Belharra-class frigate under construction since 2022, projected to be commissioned in 2025.
