= Waddell House =

Waddell House or Waddel House may refer to:

- Church-Waddel-Brumby House, Athens, Georgia, listed on the NRHP in Georgia
- Waddell House (Lexington, Missouri), listed on the NRHP in Missouri
- George Waddell House, Anaconda, Montana, listed on the NRHP in Montana
- William Waddell House, Grassy Creek, North Carolina, listed on the NRHP in North Carolina
- Waddel Mansion, Webster, South Dakota, listed on the NRHP in South Dakota
