= James Waddell =

James Waddell may refer to:

- James Waddel (1739–1805), American preacher
- James Waddell (army officer) (1872–1954), New Zealand soldier
- James Waddell (civil servant) (1914–2004), British civil servant
- James Iredell Waddell (1824–1886), Confederate naval officer
- Jimmy Waddell, Scottish curler
