= John Waddell =

John Waddell may refer to:

- John Waddell (engineer) (1828–1888), Scottish railway contractor
- John Waddell (footballer) (born 1966), English-Australian footballer
- John Alexander Low Waddell (1854–1938), American civil engineer and bridge designer
- John Waddell (politician) (1891–1939), Australian politician
- John Henry Waddell (1921–2019), American sculpture artist
- John Kenneth Waddell, former president of Allen University, Columbia, South Carolina
- John Newton Waddel (1812–1895), American clergyman, educator
- Rankin (photographer) (John Rankin Waddell, born 1966), British portrait and fashion photographer
- John Waddell, Irish author, and former Professor of Archaeology
