= CSS Shenandoah =

Confederate Navy warship

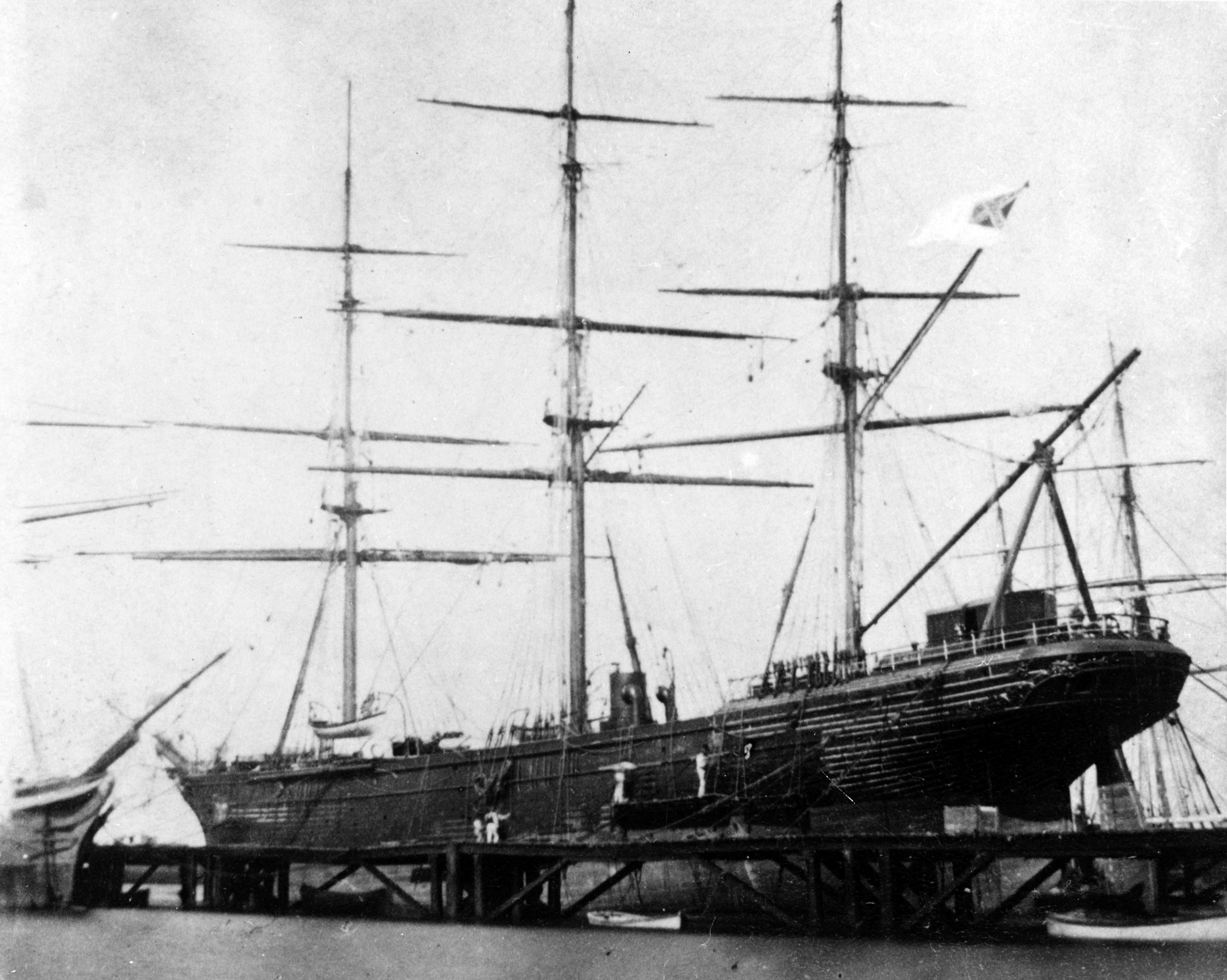
- On a slip at Williamstown, Colony of Victoria (now a suburb of Melbourne, Australia) in 1865

History

Confederate States
- Name: Sea King, Shenandoah, El Majidi
- Port of registry: Liverpool
- Builder: Alexander Stephen & Sons, River Clyde, Scotland
- Yard number: 42
- Launched: August 17, 1863
- Acquired: 1863
- Recommissioned: October 19, 1864
- Decommissioned: November 6, 1865
- Maiden voyage: Transport troops to New Zealand and return, 10 months
- Renamed: CSS Shenandoah, HHS El-Majidi
- Fate: As El Majidi foundered in November 1879

General characteristics
- Type: Extreme clipper hull
- Tonnage: 1018 grt, 790 nrt
- Length: 230 ft (70 m)
- Beam: 32.5 ft (9.9 m)
- Draft: 20 ft 6 in (6.25 m)
- Decks: poop, main, berth
- Deck clearance: 7.5 ft (2.3 m)
- Installed power: 200 HP A. & J. Inglis steam engine
- Propulsion: 14 ft-diameter (4.3 m) bronze propeller
- Sail plan: Full-rigged ship
- Speed: 8 knots (15 km/h) under steam; 16 knots (30 km/h) under sail
- Complement: 109 officers and men
- Armament: 4 × 8 in (203 mm) smoothbore cannons, 2 × 12 pounder (5 kg) rifled Whitworth cannons, 2 × 32 pounder (15 kg) cannons

CSS Shenandoah, formerly Sea King and later El Majidi, was an iron-framed, teak-planked, full-rigged sailing ship with auxiliary steam power chiefly known for her actions under Lieutenant Commander James Waddell as part of the Confederate States Navy during the American Civil War.

Shenandoah was originally a British merchant ship launched as Sea King on August 17, 1863, but was later repurposed as one of the most feared commerce raiders in the Confederate Navy. For twelve-and-a-half months from 1864 to 1865, she undertook commerce raiding around the world in an effort to disrupt the Union's economy, capturing and sinking or bonding 38 merchant vessels, mostly whaling ships from New Bedford, Massachusetts. She finally surrendered on the River Mersey, Liverpool, United Kingdom, on November 6, 1865, six months after the war had ended.

Shenandoah is also known for having fired the last shot of the Civil War, across the bow of a whaler in waters off the Aleutian Islands.

== History and mission ==
A pencil sketch of CSS Shenandoah, from the inside cover of a notebook kept by her commanding officer

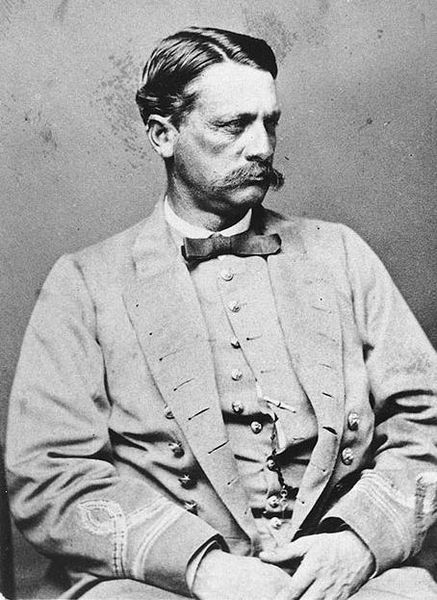
Commander James I. Waddell

The ship had three names and many owners in her lifetime of nine years. She was designed as an auxiliary composite passenger cargo ship of 1,018 tons and built in 1863 by Alexander Stephen & Sons, Glasgow, Scotland, for Robertson & Co., Glasgow, to be named Sea King. The ship was intended for the East Asia tea trade and as a troop transport. While she was being fitted out at the builders, US representatives assessed the ship for purchase. After change of owner and a number of trips to the Far East carrying cargo and to New Zealand transporting troops to the New Zealand Wars, the Confederate navy assessed and purchased her from Wallace Bros of Liverpool. The purchase, made in secret, was completed on 18 October 1864, and the next day the ship was renamed CSS Shenandoah. The ship was to be converted into an armed cruiser with a mission to capture and destroy Union merchant ships. Liverpool was the unofficial home port of the Confederate overseas fleet, and Confederate Commander James Dunwoody Bulloch was based in the city. The city provided ships, crews, munitions, and provisions of war.

Sea King sailed from London on 8 October 1864, ostensibly for Bombay on a trading voyage. The supply steamer Laurel sailed from Liverpool the same day. The two ships rendezvoused at Funchal, Madeira, with Laurel carrying the officers and the nucleus of Shenandoah's crew, together with naval guns, ammunition, and ship's stores. Shenandoah's commander, Lieutenant James Iredell Waddell, supervised her conversion to a man-of-war in nearby waters. However, Waddell was barely able to bring his crew to even half strength, despite additional volunteers from the merchant sailors on Sea King and from Laurel.

The new Confederate cruiser was commissioned on 19 October 1864, lowering the Union Jack and raising the "Stainless Banner", and was renamed CSS Shenandoah.

As developed in the Confederate Navy Department and by its agents in Europe, Shenandoah was tasked to strike at the Union's economy and "seek out and utterly destroy" commerce in areas yet undisturbed. Captain Waddell began seeking enemy merchant ships on the Indian Ocean route between the Cape of Good Hope and Australia, and in the Pacific whaling fleet. En route to the Cape, the Confederates captured six prizes. Five were burned or scuttled, after the crew and passengers had been removed. The sixth was bonded and used to transport the prisoners to Bahia, Brazil, where they were released. On the 2 January 1865, the Shenandoah briefly stopped at Île Saint-Paul, and some of the crew debarked to explore the island and gather food.

=== Colony of Victoria stopover ===
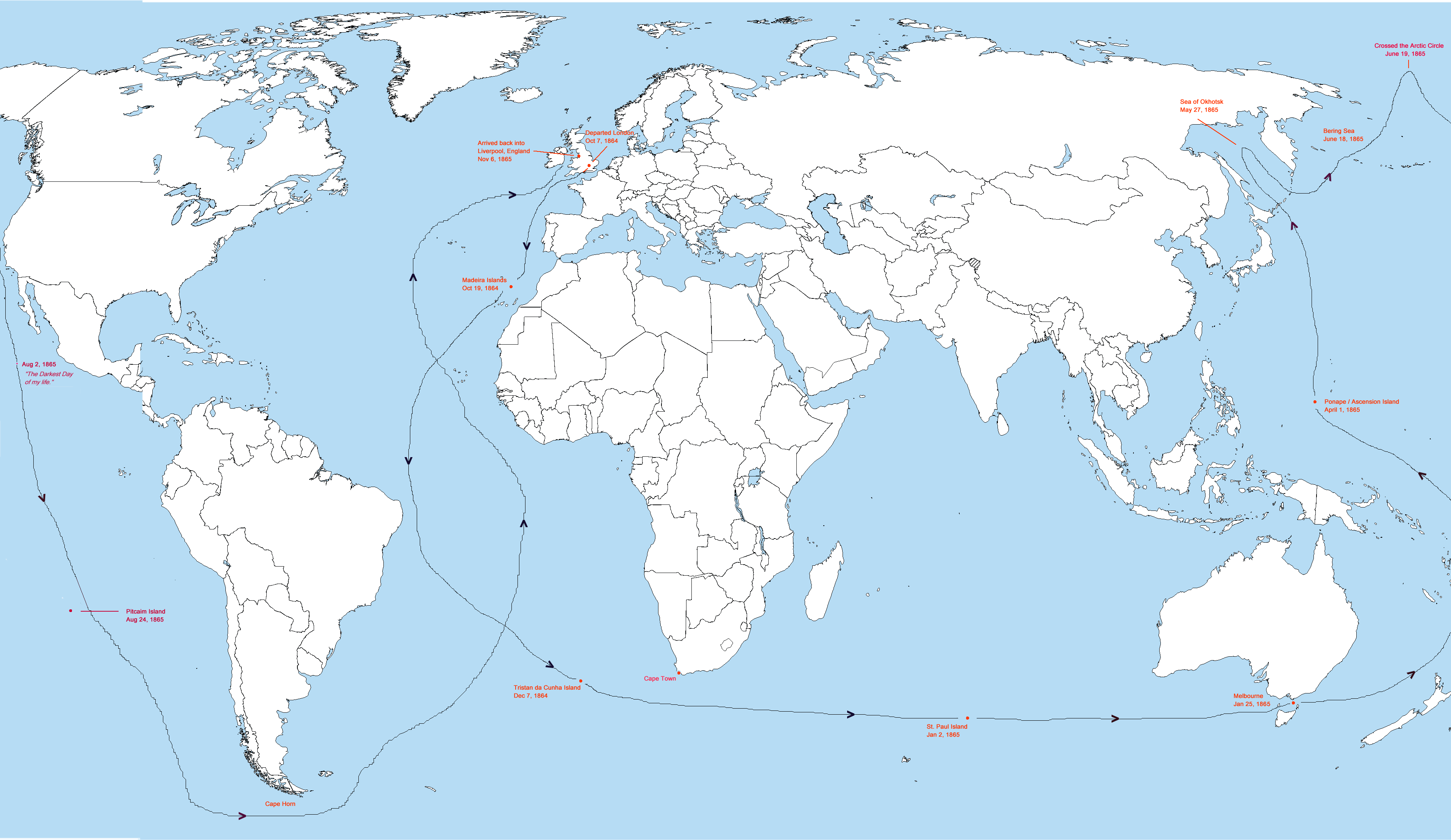
Map of Shenandoah's 12½-month voyage around the world (21st-century boundaries shown)

Still short-handed, Shenandoah arrived at Melbourne, Colony of Victoria, on January 25, 1865, where she filled her complement and her storerooms. She also signed on 40 crew members who had been stowaways from Melbourne. They were not enlisted until the ship was outside the Colony of Victoria's territorial waters. The Shipping Articles show all 40 crew members had enlisted on the day of her departure from Melbourne, February 18, 1865. However, 19 of Waddell's crew deserted at Melbourne, some giving statements of their service to the United States Consul.

=== Pacific raids ===
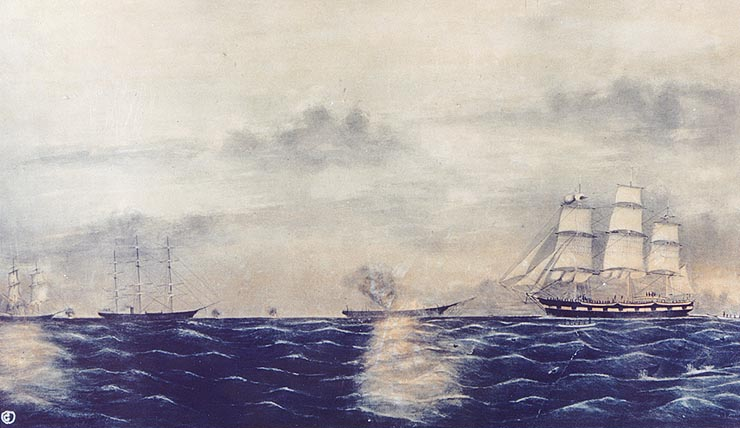
Shenandoah destroying whaling ships

Shenandoah took only one prize in the Indian Ocean, but hunting became more profitable after refitting in Melbourne. En route to the North Pacific whaling grounds, on April 3–4, Waddell burned four whalers in the Caroline Islands. After a three-week cruise to the ice and fog of the Sea of Okhotsk yielded only a single prize, due to a warning which had preceded him, Waddell headed north past the Aleutian Islands into the Bering Sea and the Arctic Ocean. Shenandoah then proceeded to capture 11 more prizes.

The rich whaling grounds in the Bering Sea between Siberia and Alaska had been a safe haven for Yankee whalers for most of the American Civil War. This prosperous whaling ended in the spring and summer of 1865 when Shenandoah arrived and captured 20 of the 58 Yankee whalers working there. These whalers were destroyed more than a month after CSA President Jefferson Davis was captured on May 10, 1865.

On June 27, 1865, Waddell learned from a prize, Susan & Abigail, that General Robert E. Lee had surrendered the Army of Northern Virginia almost three months earlier at Appomattox Court House. Susan & Abigail's captain produced a San Francisco newspaper reporting the flight from Richmond of the Confederate government 10 weeks previously. However, the newspaper also contained President Davis' proclamation that the "war would be carried on with renewed vigor." Waddell then captured 10 more whalers in the space of seven hours just below the Arctic Circle.

On August 3, 1865, Waddell learned of the war's definite end when Shenandoah encountered the Liverpool barque Barracouta, which was bound for San Francisco. Waddell was heading to the city to attack it, believing it weakly defended. He learned of the surrender of Johnston's army on April 26, and Kirby Smith's army on May 26, and most crucially of the capture of President Davis. Captain Waddell then knew the war was over.

Captain Waddell lowered the Confederate flag, and Shenandoah underwent physical alteration. Her guns were dismounted and stowed below deck, and her hull was painted to look like an ordinary merchant ship.

Names and dates of 38 vessels captured by CSS Shenandoah, 1864–1865:

- 1. October 30, 1864: the cargo bark Alina is scuttled south of the Azores, west of Dakar, near 16°47′N 26°43′W.
- 2. November 6: the cargo schooner Charter Oak of Boston, Massachusetts, is burned in the mid-Atlantic at 7°35′N 27°46′W.
- 3. November 8: the cargo bark D. Godfrey of Boston is sunk southwest of the Cape Verde Islands, near 6°28.5′N 28°24′W.
- 4. November 10: the cargo hermaphrodite brig Susan of Boston is scuttled southwest of the Cape Verde Islands.
- 5, 6. November 12: the neutral cargo ship Kate Prince of Portsmouth, New Hampshire, is bonded for $40,000 at 1°45′N 29°22′W; the prisoners are sent to Bahia, Brazil. The bark Adelaide is ransomed for $24,000 and released.
- 7. November 13: the cargo schooner Lizzie M. Stacey of Boston is scuttled and burned near the Equator.
- 8. December 4: the whaling bark Edward is burned off Tristan da Cunha, near 37°47′S 12°30.5′W.
- 9. December 29: the bark Delphine of Bangor, Maine is burned at 12°13′S 68°33′E in the Indian Ocean, 1,550 kilometres (960 mi) south-southwest of India.
- From January 26 to February 17, 1865, repairs, crew recruiting and resupply was done at Hobson's Bay, Australia.
- 10. April 3: the whaling bark Pearl of New London is burned at Lohd Pah Harbor 6°48′37″N 158°18′58″E, Pohnpei Island in Micronesia.
- 11, 12. April 4: the whaling ships Hector of New Bedford and Edward Carey of San Francisco are burned at Lohd Pah Harbor.
- 13. April 10: the whaling bark Harvest, nominally of Honolulu, is also burned at Lohd Pah Harbor; at 7:30 AM, Shenandoah departs Lohd Pah Harbor for the Bering Sea.
- 14. May 28: the whaling bark Abigail of New Bedford is burned in the Sea of Okhotsk at 57°7′N 153°1′E, 1,000 km (620 mi) north of the Kurile Islands.
- 15–20. June 22: in the Bering Sea, the whaling ship Euphrates, of New Bedford, is burned near 62°23′N 179°46′E; the whaling bark Jirah Swift, of New Bedford, is burned; the whaling ship Milo is bonded for $46,000; the whaling ship William Thompson, of New Bedford, is burned northeast of Cape Narrows; the whaling bark Sophia Thornton of New Bedford is burned at 62°40′N 178°50′W; and the brigantine Susan & Abigail of San Francisco is burned at 62°48′N 179°4′W.
- 21. June 25: the ship General Williams of New London is burned near St. Lawrence Island in the Bering Strait at 63°50′N 172°58′W.
- 22–27. June 26: the whaling barks Catherine and Isabella of New Bedford are burned in the Bering Sea at 64°21′N 172°20′W; the whaling ship Gipsey is burned in the Bering Strait; the whaling ship William C. Nye of New Bedford is burned; the whaling ship Nimrod of New Bedford is burned near St. Lawrence Island; and finally, the whaling bark General Pike of New Bedford is bonded for $30,000, loaded with 252 prisoners, and sent off to San Francisco.
- 28–38. June 28: on this last and busiest day of captures, the whaler Brunswick is burned near Bering Strait Narrows; the whaling bark Congress of New Bedford is burned near Bering Strait; the whaling bark Covington of Warren, Rhode Island is burned in East Cape Bay near Bering Strait Narrows; the whaling ships Favorite of New Haven and Hillman, Isaac Howland, Martha and Nassau of New Bedford are burned in East Cape Bay; the whaling bark Waverly of New Bedford is burned near the Diomede Islands; the whaling ship James Maury of New Bedford is bonded for $37,600 in East Cape Bay and retained for transporting prisoners to the United States; and finally, the whaling bark Nile of New Bedford is bonded for $41,000, loaded with 222 prisoners, and sent off to San Francisco.

== Surrender ==
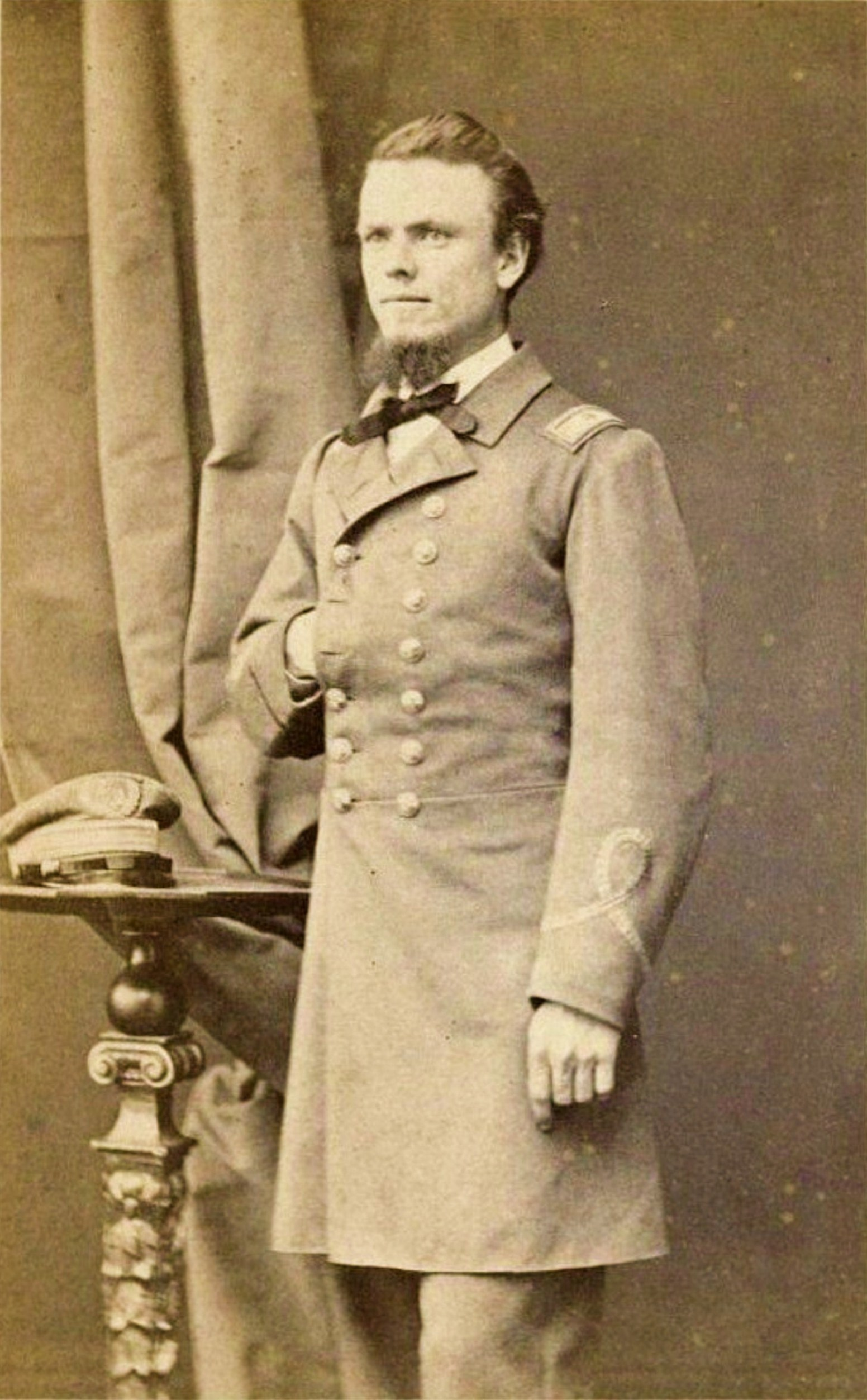
Lieutenant John Grimball (1840–1922) of CSS Shenandoah by Georges Penabert, a French photographer

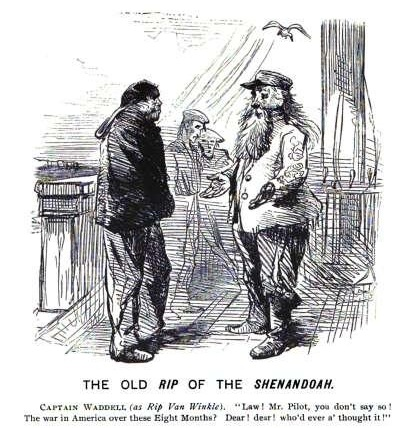
Editorial cartoon satirizing Lt. Cmdr James Waddell for still engaging in combat after the American Civil War was widely regarded as over

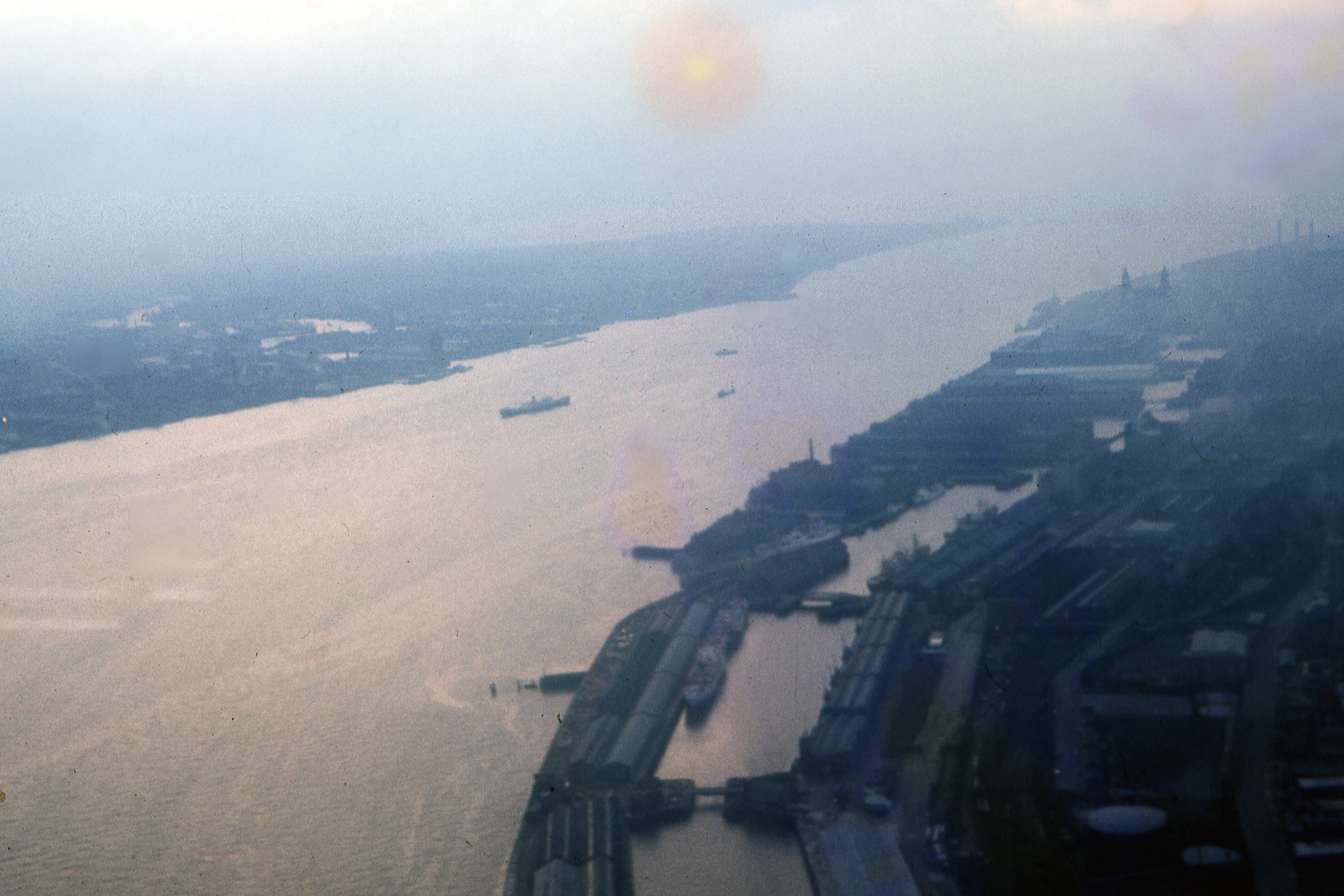
The River Mersey with Liverpool on the right bank. CSS Shenandoah surrendered approximately where the ship is in mid-river. The open sea is to the top.

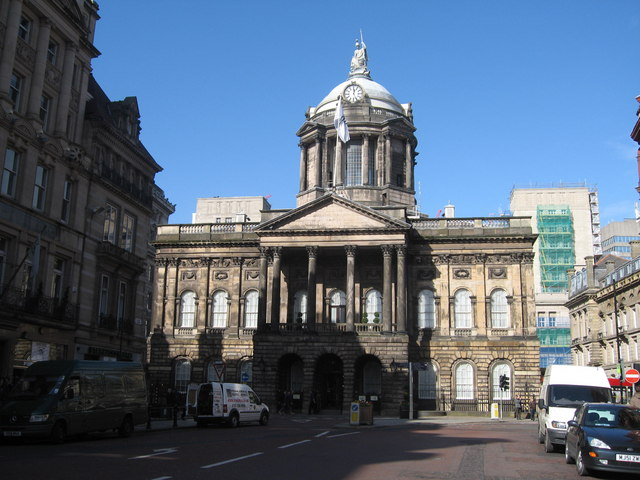
Liverpool Town Hall. The last act of the Civil War was Captain Waddell walking up the steps.

Regardless of Davis's proclamation and knowing the unreliability of newspapers at the time, Captain Waddell and his crew knew returning to a U.S. port would mean facing a court sympathetic to the Union. News of Lincoln's assassination also served to further diminish any expectation for leniency. The crew predicted that surrendering to federal authorities would run the risk of being tried in a U.S. court and hanged as pirates. Commerce raiders were not included in the reconciliation and the amnesty that Confederate soldiers were given. Perhaps more importantly, Waddell would have been aware that the U.S. government no longer had to consider the threat of Confederate retaliation against Union prisoners while it determined his crew's fate. Likely not known to Waddell was that Captain Raphael Semmes of CSS Alabama had managed to escape charges of piracy by surrendering on May 1, 1865, as an army general under Joseph E. Johnston. Semmes's former sailors surrendered as artillerymen.

Captain Waddell eventually decided to surrender his ship at the port of Liverpool, where Confederate Commander Bulloch was stationed.

=== Last lowering of Confederate flag ===
CSS Shenandoah sailed from off the west coast of Mexico via Cape Horn to Liverpool, a voyage of three months and over 9,000 nautical miles (10,000 mi; 17,000 km) and was all the while pursued by Union vessels. She anchored at the Mersey Bar at the mouth of the estuary awaiting a pilot to board her to guide the ship up the river and into the enclosed docks. The pilot refused to take the ship, which was not flying any flag, into Liverpool; the crew raised the Confederate flag. CSS Shenandoah sailed up the River Mersey with the flag fully flying to crowds on the riverbanks.

The Liverpool Mercury reported the event on Tuesday, 7 November 1865:

THE CONFEDERATE CRUISER SHENANDOAH IN THE MERSEY. Considerable excitement was caused on 'Change yesterday morning by circulation of the report that the Confederate cruiser Shenandoah, of whose exploits amongst the American whalers in the North Pacific so much has been heard, was passed about 8 o'clock by the steamer Douglas at anchor at the bar, of Victoria Channel, apparently waiting for high water. By many the report was discredited, it being thought that those on board the Douglas were in error, and had mistaken some other craft for the celebrated ex-Confederate cruiser. At half past ten, however, all doubts on the point were set at rest, with the Shenandoah steaming up the Victoria Channel with the Palmetto flag flying from her masthead.

HMS Donegal happened to be anchored in mid-river between Toxteth in Liverpool and Tranmere in Birkenhead. Captain Waddell maneuvered his ship near to the British man-of-war, dropping anchor. CSS Shenandoah was surrendered by Captain Waddell to Captain Paynter of HMS Donegal on 6 November 1865. The Confederate flag was lowered again for the last time, under the watch of a Royal Navy detachment and the crew.

CSS Shenandoah had struck her colors twice. This marked the last surrender of the American Civil War and the last official lowering of the Confederate flag. The very last act of the Civil War was Captain Waddell walking up the steps of Liverpool Town Hall with a letter to present to the mayor surrendering his ship to the UK government. Shenandoah was the only Confederate warship to circumnavigate the globe.

The United States Naval War Records published in 1894:

The Official Records of the Union and Confederate Navies in the War of Rebellion November 5 – Arrived in the Mersey, off Liverpool, and on Monday, the 6th, surrendered the Shenandoah to the British nation, by letter to Lord John Russell, premier of Great Britain. (signed) JAMES I WADDELL.

After the surrender, CSS Shenandoah was berthed in the partially constructed Herculaneum Dock awaiting her fate. Once the international legalities were settled, she was turned over to the United States government.

=== Fate of the crew ===
After the surrender of Shenandoah to the British government, a decision had to be made of what to do with the Confederate crew, knowing the consequences of piracy charges. Clearly many of the crew originated from the United Kingdom and its colonies and were at risk of being considered pirates, and three had swum ashore in the cold November waters fearing the worst.

After a full investigation by law officers of the Crown, it was decided that the officers and crew did not infringe the rules of war or the laws of nations to justify being held as prisoners, so they were unconditionally released.

Liverpool Mercury Thursday 9th Nov. 1865.

THE SHENANDOAH. PAROLE OF THE CREW.

The government have at length taken a decided step in regard to the crew of this vessel. For the last two days the authorities in Liverpool have been in communication with the Secretary of State in reference to the detention of the ship and her crew. The Government seem to have been decided as to the necessity of retaining the vessel, pending an inquiry as to the action which her commander and crew have taken during the last few months, but there seems to have been some doubt as to the proper course to adopt with reference to the men on board. On inquiry at the Custom House yesterday morning, we were informed that the authorities had not received further instructions as to the vessel or her crew.

However, about 6 o'clock last night a telegram was received from Government by Captain Paynter, of her Majesty's ship Donegal, to whom the Shenandoah was surrendered, that the whole of the officers and crew, who were not British subjects were to be immediately paroled. Captain Paynter immediately proceeded to the Rock Ferry slip, and applied for a steamboat. The Rock Ferry steamer Bee was placed at his disposal by Mr. Thwaites, in which he immediately proceeded alongside the Shenandoah. Captain Paynter went on board and communicated to the officers the object of his visit. The crew were mustered on the quarterdeck by the officers of the ship, the roll book was brought out, and the names of the men called out as they occurred. As each man answered to his name he was asked what countryman he was. In not one instance did any of them acknowledge to be British citizens. Many nations were represented among them, but the majority claimed to be natives of the Southern States of America or "Southern citizens". Several of those however, who purported to be Americans, had an unmistakably Scotch accent, and seemed more likely to have hailed from the banks of the Clyde than the Mississippi. Captain Paynter informed the men that by order of the Government they were all paroled, and might proceed at once to shore. This intelligence was received by the men with every demonstration of joy, and they seemed to be delighted at the prospect of leaving the craft in which they had hoped to be able to assist the Southern Confederacy. They commenced to pack up their bedding and other articles as fast as possible, and conveyed on board the Bee, which was to take them to the landing stage. Before leaving the vessel, however, they gave three lusty cheers, for Captain Waddell, their late commander. Captain Waddell, in feeling terms, acknowledged the compliment, and said that he hoped the men would always behave themselves, as brave sailors ought to do. The men then went aboard the Bee, and were conveyed to the landing stage. This separated the Shenandoah and her crew, and the vessel now rides at anchor in the Sloyne in charge of some men from the Donegal, under the command of Lieutenant Cheek.

Lieutenant Commander James I. Waddell of North Carolina

- First Lieutenant and Executive Officer, W.C. Whittle* of Virginia
- Lieutenant John Grimball of South Carolina
- Lieutenant Sidney Smith Lee* Jr. of Virginia
- Lieutenant Francis Thornton Chew of Missouri
- Lieutenant Dabney Minor Scales of Mississippi
- Sailing Master Irvine S. Bulloch of Georgia
- Passed Midshipman Orris Applewaith Browne* of Virginia
- Passed Midshipman John Thompson Mason* of Virginia
- Surgeon Charles E. Lining of South Carolina
- Assistant Surgeon F.J. McNulty of District of Columbia
- Paymaster William Breedlove Smith of Louisiana
- Chief Engineer M. O'Brien of Louisiana
- Assistant Engineer Codd of Maryland
- Assistant Marine Engineer John Hutchison of Scotland
- Master's mate John Minor of Virginia
- Master's Mate Lodge Colton of Maryland
- Master's Mate Cornelius E. Hunt of Virginia
- Boatswain George Harwood of England
- Gunner Guy of England
- Carpenter O'Shea of Ireland
- Sailmaker Henry Alcott of England

Sometime in December 1865, crew members S.S. Lee, Orris M. Brown, John T. Mason and W.C. Whittle sailed from Liverpool to Buenos Aires, via Bahia, Rio de Janeiro and Montevideo. After prospecting for a while, they went to Rosario, upon Paraná River, and near there bought a small place and began farming. As the animosity of the US government began to soften towards them, Brown and Mason returned home, followed later by Lee and Whittle.

On returning home, Mason took a law course at the University of Virginia, graduated, and was successful at his profession. He settled in Baltimore, and married Miss Helen Jackson, of New York, daughter of the late Lieutenant Alonzo Jackson of the U.S. Navy.

Whittle returned home to Virginia from Buenos Aires in 1867. Born in Norfolk, Virginia in 1840, an 1858 graduate of the U.S. Naval Academy and an officer in the U.S. Navy before resigning his commission to accept a commission in the Confederate States Navy, Whittle was appointed captain of one of the Bay line steamers running between Baltimore, Norfolk and Portsmouth in 1868 shortly after returning to Virginia and continued in this capacity until 1890. After, he was a Superintendent for the Norfolk and Western Railway Company. In 1902, he became an organizer of the Virginia Bank and Trust Company, Virginia Bank and Trust Building, and served as its vice president and one of its directors thereafter.

Born in 1824, Captain Waddell was a former U.S. Navy officer with decades of sailing experience and a Mexican–American War naval combat veteran before resigning his commission to accept a commission in the Confederate States Navy. He returned from England to the United States in 1875 to captain San Francisco for the Pacific Mail Company. He later took command of a force that policed the oyster fleets in the Chesapeake Bay. In 1886, Waddell died of a brain disorder and was buried at St. Anne's Episcopal Church in Annapolis, Maryland.

Dr. Frederick J. McNulty, the ship's assistant surgeon, eventually became a resident of Boston, Massachusetts, where he was first employed as Superintendent of the City Lunatic Asylum at Austin Farm and, later, opened there a private sanitarium called Pine Grove Retreat at Roslindale while continuing to reside at 706 Huntington Avenue, Boston. He became a primary historical source for chroniclers of the actions of Shenandoah. Whittle recounts that McNulty, a man of irascible temper, laid the ship's barber out with a single blow when the barber shoved shaving soap in his mouth as part of the crew's hazing of the ship's officers in celebration of crossing the equator. McNulty enlisted as a surgical officer in the Chilean Navy immediately after the surrender of Shenandoah and later in 1869 accepted a commission in the Cuban Patriot Army, but was repeatedly prevented from traveling to join the Army by U.S. government authorities before settling in Boston in 1879. McNulty is variously reported to have been a native of Ireland, the District of Columbia and Richmond, Virginia, but was most likely Irish. He graduated from the Georgetown University School of Medicine in the District of Columbia and lived in Richmond, Virginia before resigning his commission in the medical service of the U.S. Navy to accept a commission in the Confederate States Navy. McNulty died at his home in Boston on June 14, 1897, at the age of 62.

== Fate ==
After her crew surrendered her to the British government at Liverpool on 6 November 1865, the British handed Shenandoah over to the United States government. The ship was sold to Matthew Isaac Wilson of Liverpool.

In 1867, Wilson sold her to Majid bin Said, the first Sultan of Zanzibar, who renamed her El Majidi after himself. On 15 April 1872 a hurricane hit Zanzibar. El Majidi was one of six ships owned by Seyed Burgash that were blown ashore and wrecked. Her crew were rescued. She was refloated on 7 July with assistance from HMS Wolverine. After temporary repairs she attempted to sail on 10 September 1879 with 130 passengers and crew from Zanzibar to Bombay, India, where she was to undergo further repairs., El Majidi developed holes and took on water, sinking a few days later in the Gulf of Aden off Socotra, Aden Governorate, in November 1879. There were a few survivors.

== Legacy ==
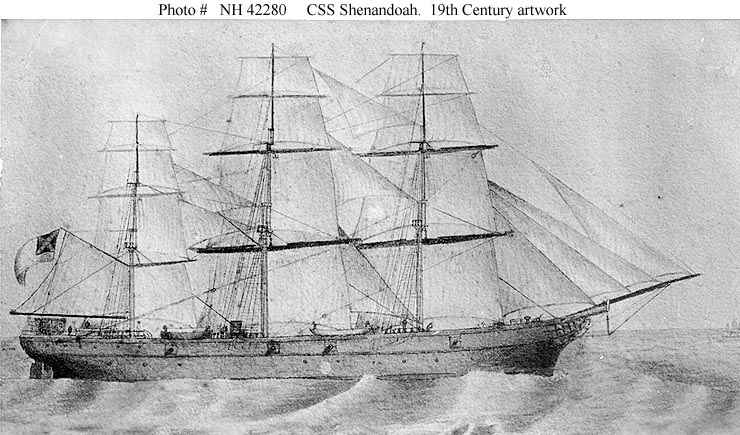
19th-century artwork depicting Shenandoah under sail

Shenandoah had remained at sea for 12 months and 17 days, traversed 58,000 miles (carrying the Confederate flag around the globe for the only time) and sank or captured 38 ships, mostly whalers, all of them American civilian merchant vessels. Waddell took close to one thousand prisoners without a single war casualty among his crew; two men died of disease. The ship was never involved in conflict against any Union Naval vessel. The Confederate cruiser claimed more than 20 prizes valued at nearly $1,400,000 (equivalent to $29,400,000 in 2025). In an important development in international law, the U.S. government pursued claims (collectively called the Alabama Claims) against the British government and, following a court of arbitration, won heavy damages.

=== Battle ensign ===
The Second Confederate Navy Ensign, 1863–1865 (MOC Catalog# 0985.03.00194)

The battle ensign of CSS Shenandoah is unique amongst the flags of the Confederate States of America as it was the only Confederate flag to circumnavigate the Earth during the Confederacy, and it was the last Confederate flag to be lowered by a combatant unit in the Civil War (in mid-river on the River Mersey at Liverpool, UK, on November 6, 1865).

Shenandoah's battle ensign has been in the Museum of the Confederacy's collection since 1907 and is currently on display. Lieutenant Dabney [Minor] Scales CSN, gave the flag to a cousin, Eliza Hull Maury, for safekeeping. Eliza Hull Maury was a daughter of, and Richard Launcelot Maury was the eldest son of, Commodore Matthew Fontaine Maury. Colonel Richard Launcelot Maury CSA, Eliza's brother, brought the flag from England in 1873, and donated it to the museum in 1907. The flag itself measures 88 by 136 inches (220 cm × 350 cm).

From the Southern Historical Society Papers:

The flag of the Shenandoah, reverently preserved by the late Colonel Richard Launcelot Maury, C. S. A., son of Commissioner Matthew Fontaine Maury, was recently deposited with the Confederate Memorial Literary Society, and is preserved in the Museum Building at Richmond, Va.—Ed.

== See also ==
- Lost Empire (Cussler novel)
