= Georges Penabert =

French photographer (1825–1903)

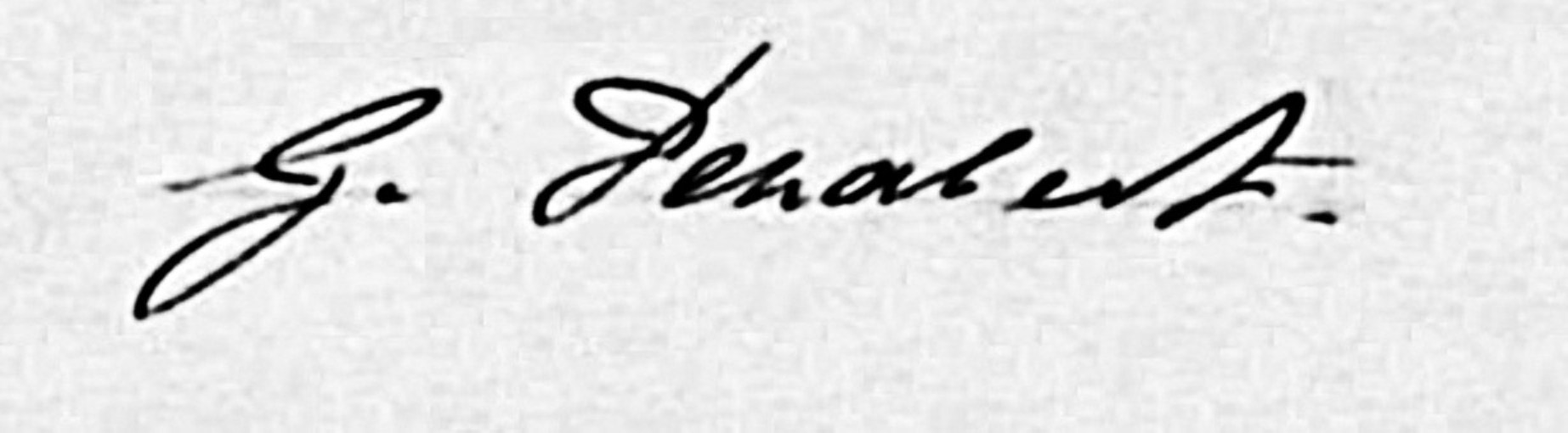
Georges Penabert signature

Georges Jean Penabert (1825–1903) was a French photographer.

== Early life ==
He was born in Arudy (Basses Pyrénées, today Pyrénées-Atlantiques), April 23, 1825. He is the son of Pierre Penabert, died in Viamão (Brazil) in 1836 and Anne Dibat, died in Porto Alegre (Brazil), October 13, 1848.

His first wife was Héloïse Valentine Déot, who died in New York City on March 9, in childbirth. His second marriage on April 8, 1869 to Marie Adélaïde Gaillant, widow of Jean Vigoureux.

Penabert had a daughter from his first marriage, Héloïse (Eloise) Valentine Penabert. She was born in New York City on March 2, 1855. She married in Paris in the 9th arrondissement, Eugene Joseph Desfossé, on October 21, 1875.

== Career ==
He lived in 1869 at 31 Passage du Havre in the 9th arrondissement in Paris. His declared profession for that year was a trader (photographer).

Penabert began ihis activity in 1858 in Paris, under the name Penabert et Cie; he practiced at various addresses: 46 rue Basse du Rempart, 31 passage of Le Havre around 1864, 36/38 passage of Le Havre in 1875. He opened two branches, 587 Broadway in New York and 108 Calle de la Havana in Cuba. He became associated with Charles DeForest Fredricks (1823–1894) and his work was awarded a Silver Medal at the Paris World Fair in 1889.

Georges Penabert died in Paris in the 11th district on December 27, 1903, at age 78.

== Gallery ==
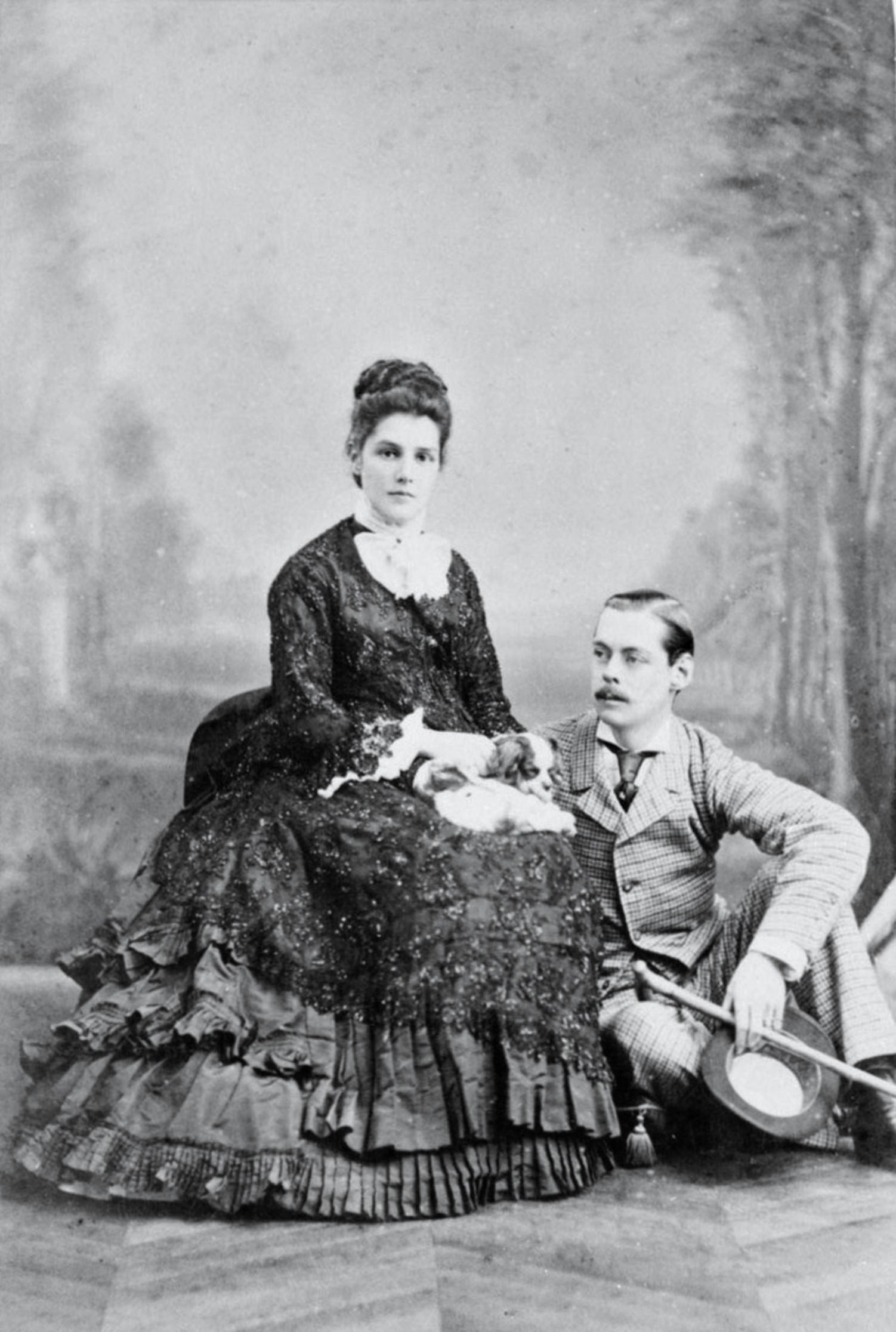
Lord Randolph Churchill and Lady Randolph Churchill (Jennie Jerome) in 1874.

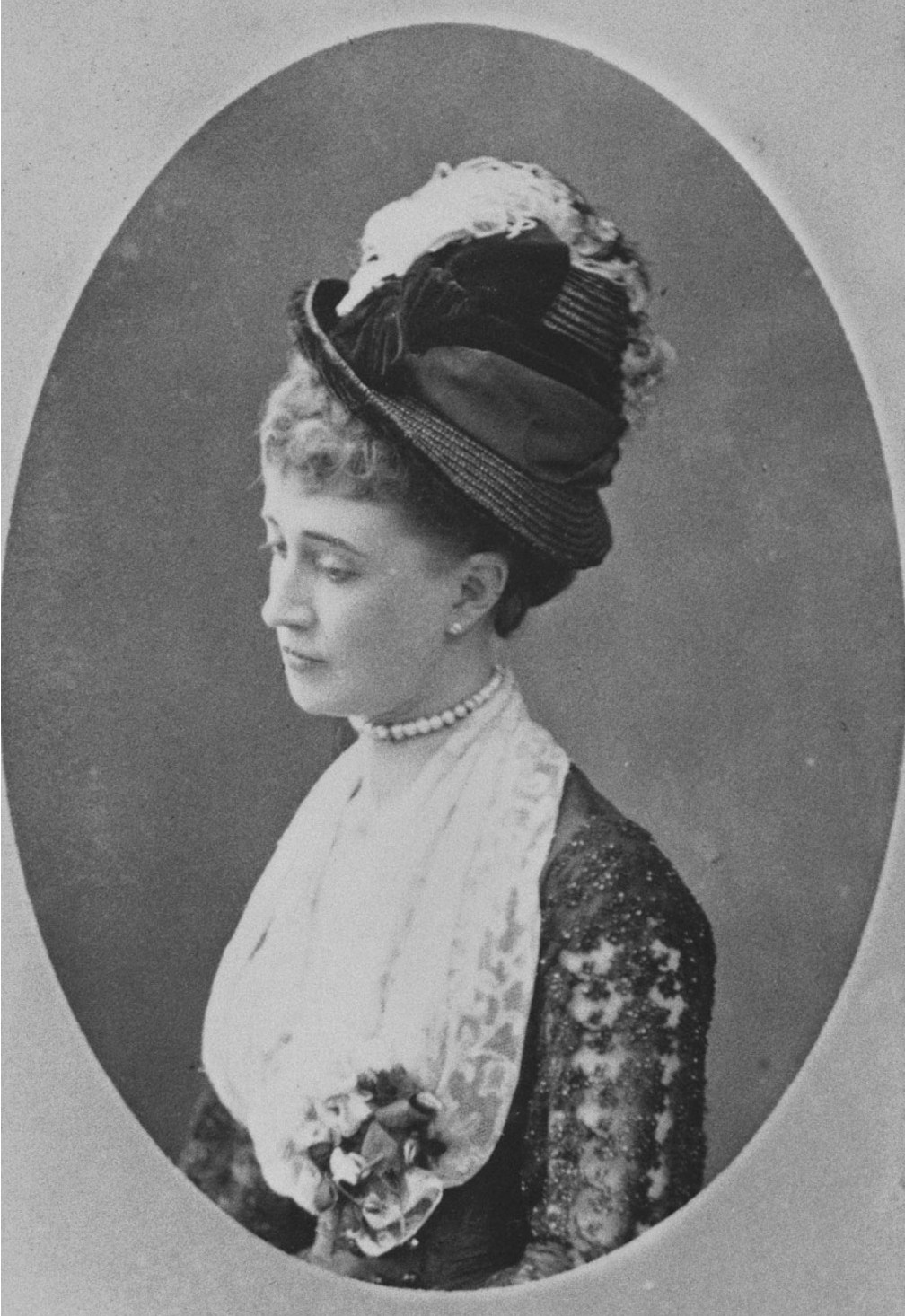
Lady Hélène Standish, wife of Henry Noailles Widdrington Standish of Standish, Lord of the manor, in 1874.

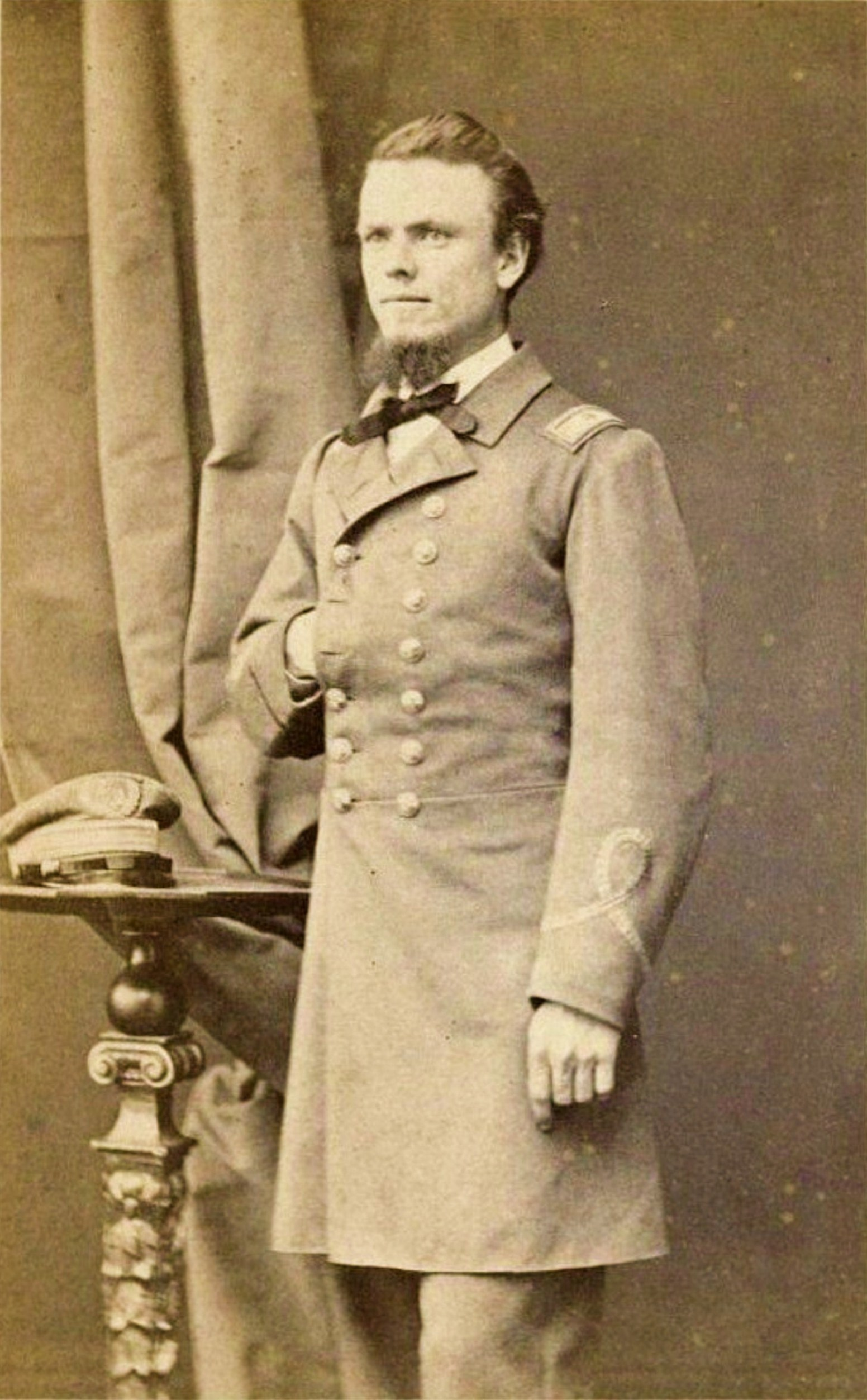
Lieutenant John Grimball (1840–1922) of CSS Shenandoah, Confederate Navy, around 1864.

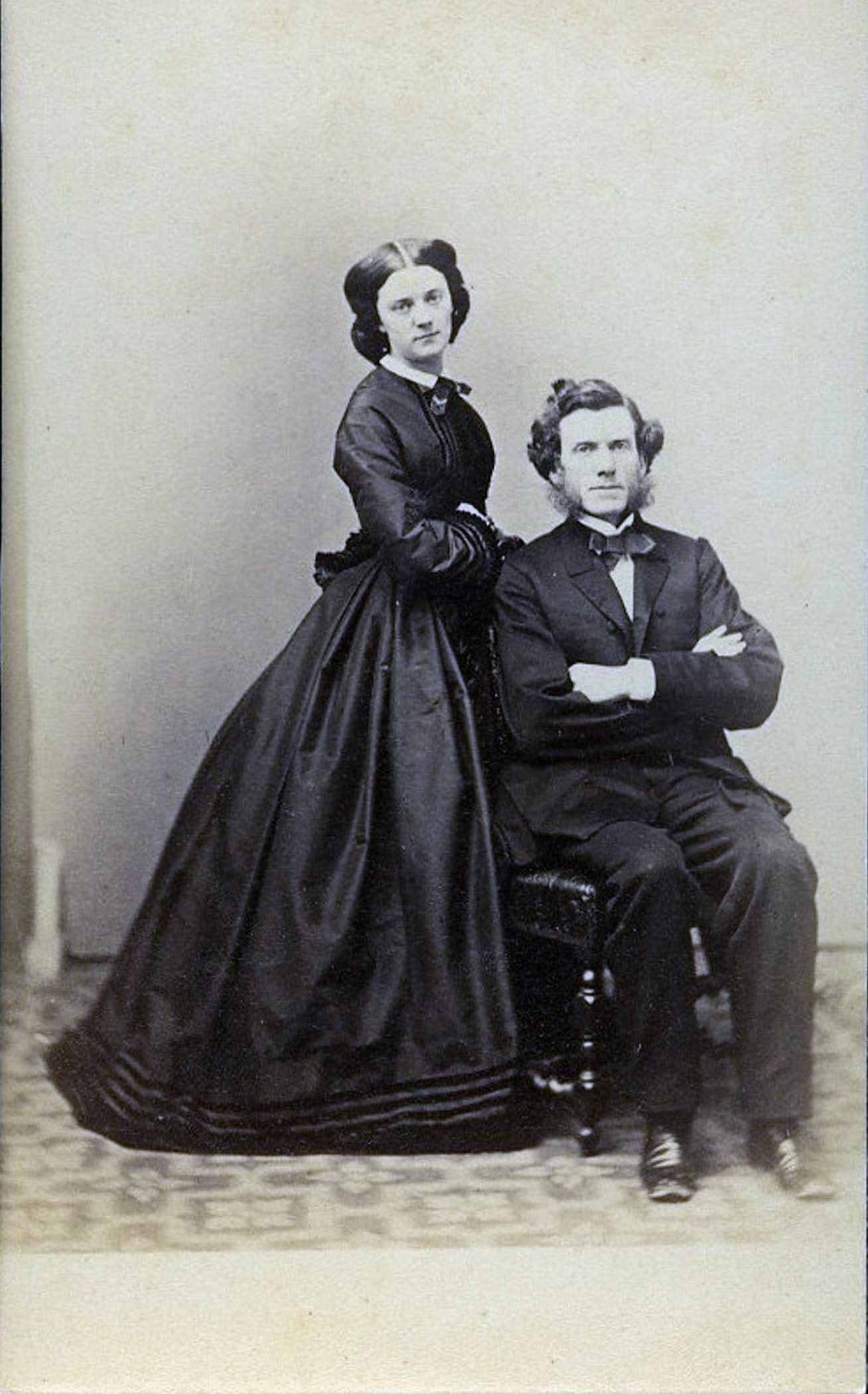
A couple under the Second French Empire in 1865.

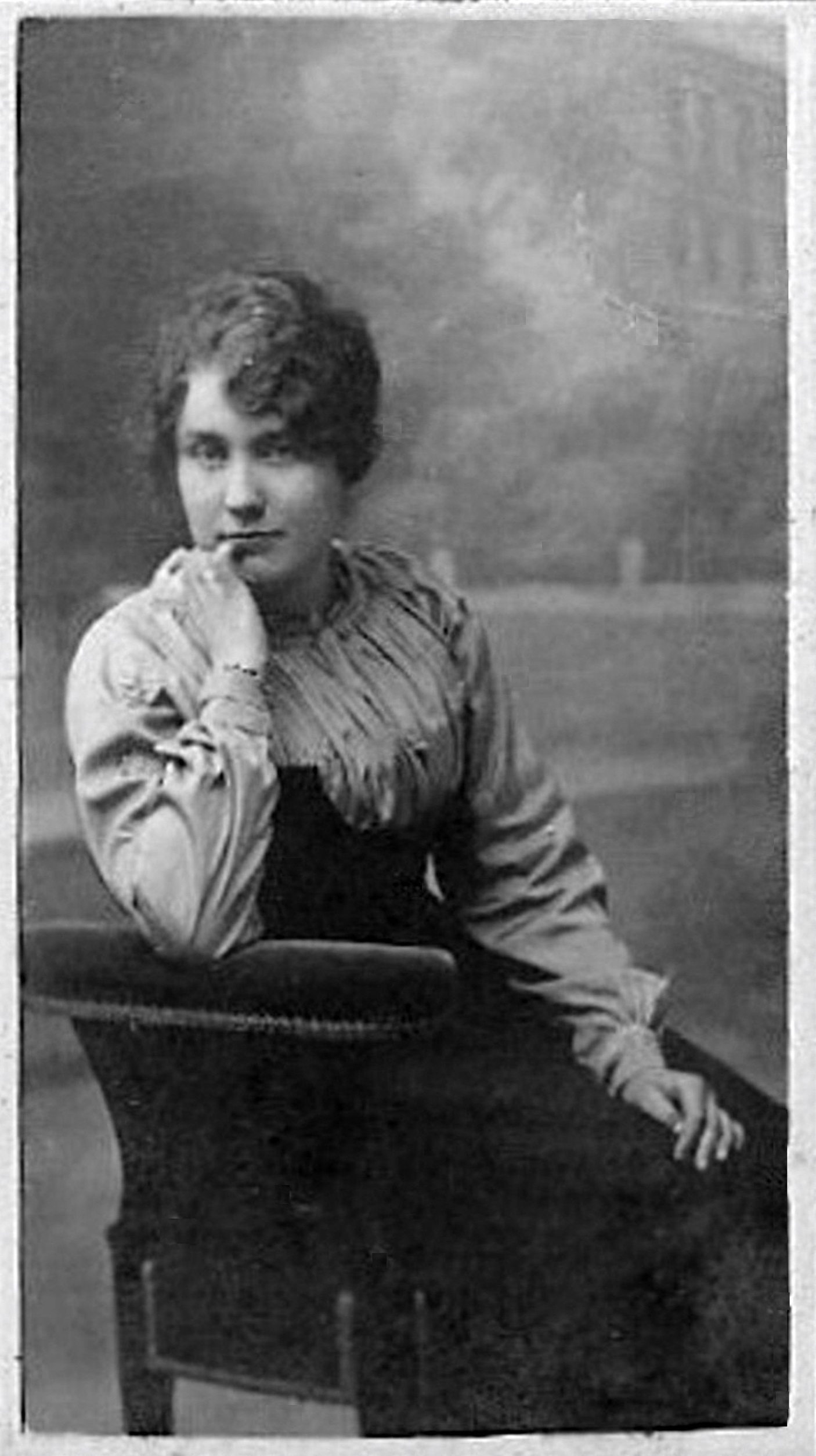
Portrait of a young woman sitting on an armchair, around 1895.

The photographs by Georges Penabert

== See also ==
- List of French photographers
