= James Iredell Waddell =

Officer in the US Navy, and later the Confederate States Navy

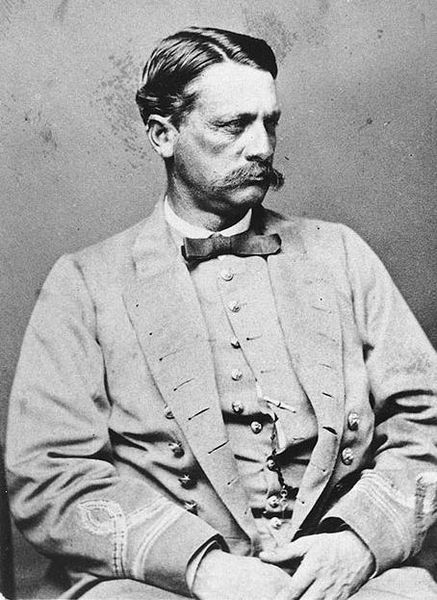
- Commander James Iredell Waddell, c. 1864-65
- Born: July 3, 1824; Pittsboro, North Carolina, U.S.
- Died: March 15, 1886 (aged 61); Annapolis, Maryland, U.S.
- Burial place: St. Anne's Cemetery, Annapolis, Maryland
- Military career
- Allegiance: United States; Confederate States
- Branch: United States Navy; Confederate States Navy
- Service years: 1841–1861 (USN); 1862–1865 (CSN)
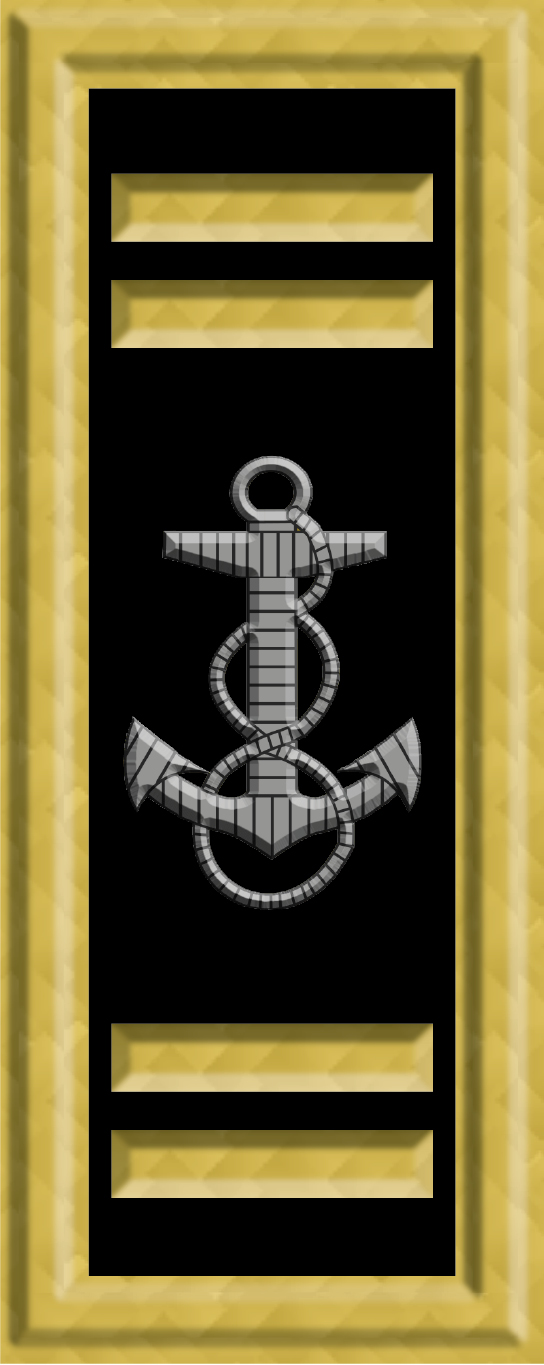
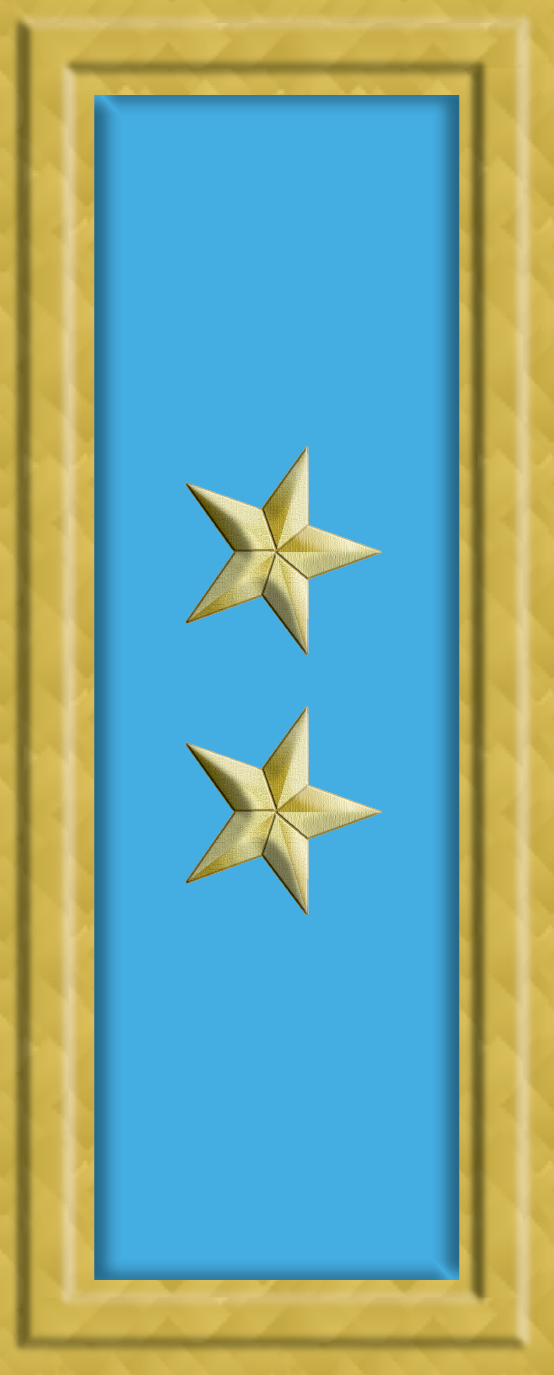
- Rank: Lieutenant (USN) Commander (CSN)
- Commands: CSS Shenandoah
- Conflicts: American Civil War

James Iredell Waddell (July 3, 1824 – March 15, 1886) was an officer in the United States Navy and later in the Confederate States Navy.

During the American Civil War, Waddell took command of the CSS Shenandoah, which he used to sail around the globe and launch raids against the U.S. Navy. It was not until August 1865 that he learned the war had ended. He eventually surrendered his vessel to British authorities in Liverpool on November 6, marking the last official surrender of the Civil War.

== Early life and career ==
Pencil sketch of CSS Shenandoah, drawn by James Iredell Waddell

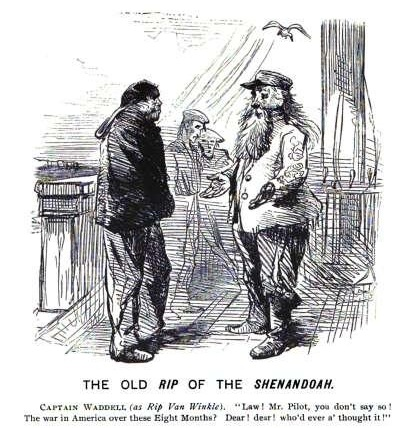
Editorial cartoon satirizing James Waddell still engaging in combat after the American Civil War was considered over

Waddell was born in Pittsboro, North Carolina. He joined the United States Navy as a midshipman in September 1841, and later graduated from the United States Naval Academy. His nearly two decades in the U.S. Navy included early service in USS Pennsylvania, Mexican–American War operations off Veracruz aboard USS Somers, a tour off South America in USS Germantown, an assignment as a United States Naval Academy instructor, eastern Pacific duty in USS Saginaw and a cruise with the East Indies Squadron with USS John Adams. Lieutenant Waddell resigned his commission while returning home in the latter ship late in 1861 at the outbreak of the American Civil War and was dismissed from the U.S. Navy in January 1862.

== American Civil War ==
In March 1862, Waddell was appointed a Lieutenant in the Confederate States Navy. Sent to New Orleans, he was assigned to the incomplete ironclad CSS Mississippi until her destruction in late April. The next month, while serving as an artillery officer ashore, he participated in the battle between Confederate shore batteries and Federal ironclads at Drewry's Bluff, Virginia. He saw more shore-battery service at Charleston, South Carolina, during the rest of 1862 and into 1863. Sent abroad in March 1863, First Lieutenant Waddell was stationed in England awaiting the availability of a seagoing position.

That opportunity finally arrived in October 1864 at sea in the central Atlantic, where he converted the British steam/sailer Sea King to the Confederate cruiser CSS Shenandoah. As her commanding officer, Commander Waddell made a long and productive cruise through the south Atlantic, across the Indian Ocean and into the north Pacific. In the Arctic waters there, he devastated the United States-flagged whaling fleet during June 1865.

On June 27, 1865, he learned from a prize, the Susan & Abigail, that General Robert E. Lee had surrendered his Army of Northern Virginia. Her captain produced a San Francisco newspaper reporting the flight from Richmond, Virginia, of the Confederate Government 10 weeks previously. However, the newspaper also contained Confederate President Jefferson Davis's proclamation that the "war would be carried on with re-newed vigor". Waddell then captured 10 more whalers in the space of 7 hours just below the Arctic Circle.

On August 3, 1865, Waddell finally learned of the war's end when he met at sea the Liverpool barque Barracouta, which was bound for San Francisco. He received the news of the surrender of General Joseph E. Johnston's army on April 26, Kirby Smith's army's surrender on May 26, and crucially the capture of President Davis and a part of his cabinet. Captain Waddell then knew that the war was over.

Waddell lowered his Confederate flag, and the CSS Shenandoah underwent physical alteration. Her guns were dismounted and stored below deck, and her hull was painted to look like an ordinary merchant vessel.

Captain Waddell presided over the last official lowering of the Confederate flag when he surrendered the CSS Shenandoah to Captain Paynter of HMS Donegal on November 6, 1865, in mid-river on the River Mersey at Liverpool. The banner was lowered in front of the crew and of a Royal Navy detachment who had boarded the vessel - this marked the last surrender of the American Civil War. The very last act of the Civil War involved Captain Waddell walking up the steps of Liverpool Town Hall with a letter to present to the Mayor of Liverpool surrendering his vessel to the British government.

== Later life ==
Waddell did not return to the United States until 1870, when he became captain of the commercial steamer City of San Francisco. He later was in charge of the State of Maryland's oyster regulation force.

He died at Annapolis, Maryland on March 15, 1886, and was buried at St. Anne's Cemetery in Annapolis.

== Namesake ==
The Charles F. Adams-class guided missile destroyer USS Waddell (DDG-24) was named for him.

== See also ==
- Bibliography of the American Civil War
- Blockade runners of the American Civil War
