= Alexander Waddell =

Scottish customs officer

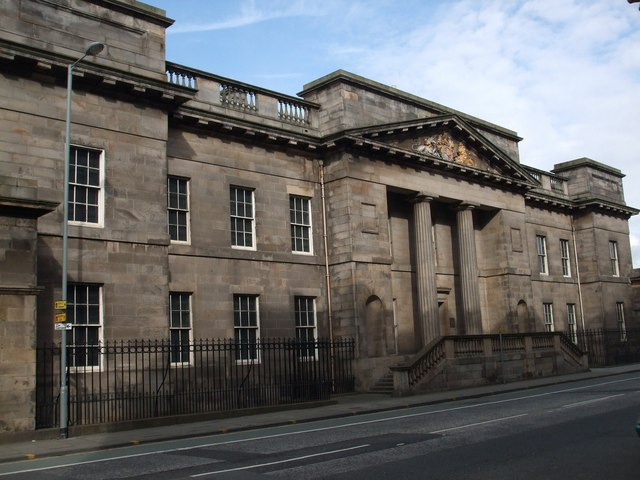
Leith Customs House

Alexander Waddell FRSE (1789–1827) was a 19th century Scot who oversaw customs and excise and was employed at the Leith Customs House. He was also an amateur meteorologist and astronomer.

== Life ==
He was born at the Shore in Leith on 23 February 1789 the son of Alexander Waddell, a "tide surveyor" (d.1806). It is likely that Alexander studied Navigation and Mathematics at Trinity House in Leith.

In 1806 (aged only 17) he appears in his own right in local street directories as an "inspector of yachts" living at Poplar Lane south of Leith Links. By 1810 he was in the same job but had moved to James Place in Leith.

He was certainly in Leith during the construction of its new Customs House, designed by Robert Reid in 1810 and completed in 1812. He would have worked in this building from its first opening.

By 1813 his job title changes to "inspector of cutters and boats" and it is clearer that he is in employment as a Government Customs Official.

By 1820 he is living at Hermitage Hill. He built an observation tower nearby, which may have served as a small observatory. This was called Hermitage Tower.

In 1823 he was elected a Fellow of the Royal Society of Edinburgh. His proposer was William Wallace. His brother Andrew Waddell had been elected a Fellow in 1819.

Alexander died at Hermitage Hill in Leith on 30 March 1827. Both Alexander and his brother died during the cholera epidemic which swept across the major cities at this time.

== Family ==
He appears to be father to both Alexander Waddell (a customs officer in Leith in 1830) and Andrew Waddell FRSE (who inherited his house at Hermitage Hill) and was also an amateur meteorologist.

In 1867 both a James Waddell and Peter Waddell FRSE are living at "Claremont Park" which was how Hermitage Hill was later known. Peter Waddell was also an astronomer and involved himself in lens design.
