= John Kenneth Waddell =

American academic and college president

John K. Waddell

President of Allen University
- In office 1998–2001

Personal details
- Education: Florida State University; University of South Carolina

Dr. John Waddell was the former President of Allen University, Columbia, South Carolina. He is an American academic, and the former President of Saint Paul's College, Lawrenceville, Virginia and Paul Quinn College, Dallas, Texas. He is currently the President of Denmark Technical College, Denmark, South Carolina. Waddell attended the University of South Carolina for his Bachelor's degree. He received his Master's degree from USC, and his Doctorate from Florida State University in 1992.
