= Hugh Waddell =

Hugh Waddell may refer to:

- Hugh Waddell (general) (c. 1734–1773), military figure in the Province of North Carolina
- Hugh Waddell (rugby league) (1958–2019), British rugby league footballer
