= Ian Waddell (footballer) =

Scottish footballer

Personal information
- Full name: Ian Waddell
- Place of birth: Scotland
- Position: Forward

Youth career
- Rutherglen Academy

Senior career*
Years	Team	Apps	(Gls)
1964–1966	Queen's Park	11	(0)
1966	Airdrieonians	3	(0)
1967–1968	Hamilton Academical	20	(2)
1968	Rutherglen Glencairn		
1968	East Stirlingshire	0	(0)

International career
1965	Scotland Amateurs	1	(0)
- * Club domestic league appearances and goals

Ian Waddell is a retired amateur Scottish football forward who appeared in the Scottish League for Hamilton Academical, Queen's Park and Airdrieonians. He was capped by Scotland at amateur level.
