= Simone Waddell =

Australian jazz singer, songwriter, vocal coach (born 1975)

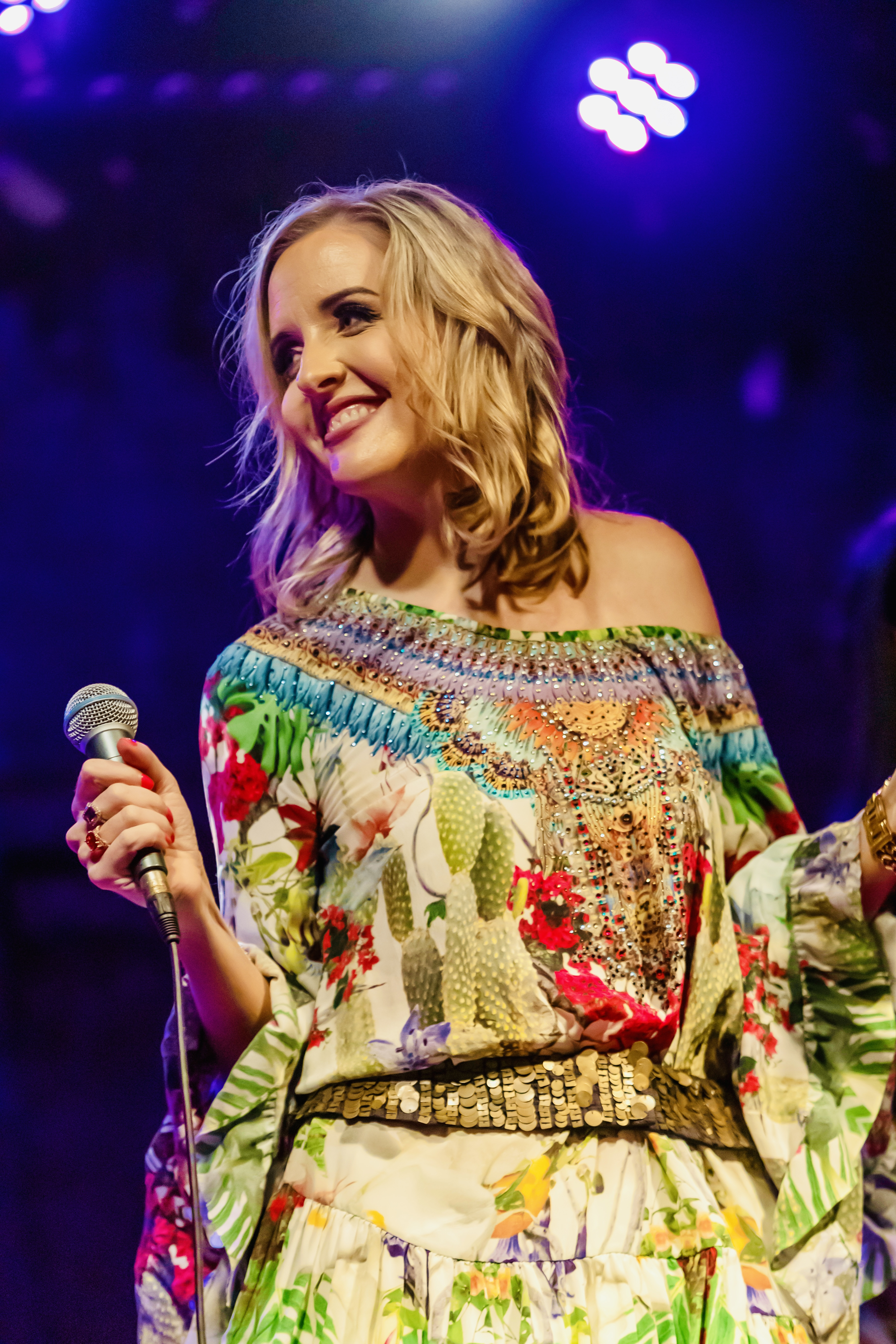
- Born: Simone Lesley Waddell; 16 December 1975 (age 50); Sydney, Australia
- Citizenship: Australian
- Education: Lugarno Primary School; Inaburra High School; The McDonald College of Performing Arts; Southern Cross University (BA); Berklee College of Music; Sydney Conservatorium of Music (MMus)
- Occupations: Singer, recording artist, vocal coach, advocate
- Years active: 1996–present
- Website: simonewaddell.com

Simone Lesley Waddell (born 16 December 1975) is an Australian jazz singer, songwriter, vocal coach, and advocate for justice. She is the founder, lead vocal coach, and workshop facilitator of You Have a Voice. Waddell is known for her fusion of jazz with other genres and has performed in several countries.

== Early life and education ==
Waddell was born on 16 December 1975, in Sydney, Australia, to Graham and Ellie Waddell. Her mother was a trained secretary, and her father, a printer, was also a church pianist, which influenced her early musical interests. Her paternal grandfather was Scottish born in Glasgow, while her maternal ancestry is rooted in Australia. She is a 5th generation Australian.

She became interested in music at the age of seven and began taking piano lessons. Her first singing teacher was Fairlie Garven while at Inubarra High School, followed by Valerie Tamblyn-Mills during tertiary study.

In pursuit of a career in music after completing her early education, she became the first Australian recipient of a scholarship to the Berklee College of Music in Boston in 1995.

She was invited to perform for Berklee's dean, Warwick Carter, during his visit to the Southern Cross University Music Department in 1995.

At Berklee, she studied under instructors, including Dennis Montgomery and Maggi Scott. She received a bachelor of arts in contemporary music in 1997 from Southern Cross University which combined her Australian and American studies. Later, Waddell completed her master of music (Performance) degree at the Sydney Conservatorium of Music in 2018. Her master's research focused on the Australian singer Kerrie Biddell, who has been Waddell's personal mentor from 1991 to 2014.

In 2017, Waddell won an academic grant from the Sydney Conservatorium of Music, and presented her research at the Auckland University for the 40th Australian and New Zealand Musicological Society Conference.

She also holds several certifications, including trauma healing, mindfulness, and life coaching.

== Career ==
Waddell's musical career began with her 1996 album Take My Love, followed by Make It Happen in the same year. After completing her bachelor of arts, she has performed in different countries, including the United States, Japan, China, and Norway, as well as throughout Australia. Her music involves a fusion of Jazz, soul, and gospel genres with blues, funk, pop, and R&B. Previously, she received early recognition as the winner of the Nescafé Big Break competition in 1995 and later served as a judge for the contestants.

In 2013, she published the e-book How to Strengthen Your Voice in Five Easy Steps.

In 2015, she released My Romance at Foundry 616. In the following year, Waddell released her fourth album, Surrender, at Foundry 616 and the Brass Monkey.

Waddell worked as a vocal coach for the Watoto Children's Choir in Uganda in 2018.

Waddell co-authored a book, The Attitude of Gratitude, published in 2020.

Later in 2021, Waddell led a two-day musical masterclass for students at Trinity Anglican College, described by The Border Mail as "absolutely brilliant".

In April 2022, Waddell released the album The Art of Collaboration with Ambition Music. The album featured more than 60 musicians, including Tommy Emmanuel, James Morrison, Paul Grabowsky, and Rai Thistlethwayte. It combined Waddell's original compositions with jazz arrangements of Australian popular songs. The Australian gave the album a four-and-a-half-star review. A review by 2MBS Fine Music Sydney described it as a jazz recording that combined reinterpretations of popular songs with original compositions. Barry O'Sullivan reviewed Waddell's vocals, composition, phrasing, and collaborations with the participating musicians. He states, “Waddell stretches boundaries with her collaborators and demonstrates her mastery of vocals and composition. This coupled with her use of dynamics and phrasing, offer a compelling listening experience.”

In November 2023, Waddell was featured on the cover of Fine Music Magazine.

In 2024, she commenced a partnership and representation with First Artists and Robert Rigby to create her live theatre shows, The Great Ladies of Jazz and Unforgettable.

Waddell released her single "Calling You" in collaboration with Damien Cooper and James Napier in 2024.

Waddell’s sixth studio album, Unforgettable, was released on 8 May 2026 through Ambition Music. The ten-track album features new interpretations of songs associated with the Great American Songbook. Pianist Paul Grabowsky appears on all ten tracks. Other contributors include Philip Rex, David Jones, James Muller, Damien Cooper, Paul Mason, Tony Azzopardi, Nadje Noordhuis, Marcus Printup, and Warwick Alder, with guest vocalists Gregg Arthur, Doug Williams, and Mary Kiani. Michael Tan mixed and mastered the album. Unforgettable debuted at number 43 on the ARIA Albums Chart, marking Waddell’s first entry in the national top 50. It reached number two on the ARIA Jazz & Blues Albums Chart and number four on the Australian Artist Albums Chart in its second week. Eric Myers reviewed the album for Sydney Arts Guide and awarded it five stars, commenting on its arrangements and the participating Australian and international jazz musicians.

In March and April 2026, Waddell undertook a professional development, performance, and educational program in Auckland, New Zealand. On 1 April 2026, Waddell was a guest facilitator at the Jazz Forum at the University of Auckland. Sheworked with jazz students studying vocals, piano, guitar, bass, drums, brass, improvisation, and ensemble performance. The session covered vocal interpretation, performance confidence, audience communication, and how instrumentalists listen to and accompany singers. During the visit, Waddell also undertook professional mentoring with Field on artistic direction, repertoire, career sustainability, international work, and educational facilitation.

On 26 March 2026, she delivered vocal masterclasses at Diocesan School for Girls in Auckland. On 24 March 2026, Waddell performed at the Auckland Jazz and Blues Club at Birkenhead RSA in Auckland. She performed original contemporary jazz repertoire with New Zealand musicians Miles Boermans, Alex Pipes, Hank Trenton, and George Brajkovich.

In addition, Waddell has taught voice at Newtown High School of the Performing Arts, The McDonald College, and other schools, and provided private vocal coaching. Her workshop and retreat programs included You Have A Voice, Sing From Your Soul, Your Music Video, Focus, Be Free, You Have a Groove, Experience the Recording Studio, Hearts Have Beats with Steve Clisby, Heavenly Healing Retreat, and Song of Your Life. She also developed vocal training materials, including Fundamental Vocal Technique Exercises, Advanced Vocal Technique Exercises, and workshop DVD sets.

== Personal life and advocacy ==
Waddell is a cousin of the Australian singer Sia.

During her studies in Lismore in 1994 and 1995, Waddell volunteered at the Lismore Soup Kitchen and connected with people in Aboriginal communities throughout the area. This led to her increasing awareness and support of issues related to Australian Aboriginal people.

She married an American missionary in 1999, Alberto Alfaro, who was arrested in New South Wales in 2006 and subsequently criminally charged with sexual assault against her. Waddell later received compensation from the NSW Victims of Crime Tribunal for category three sexual assault and category three domestic violence as a result of Alfaro's abuse toward her by proxy, their son. Waddell has since worked toward legal and social changes in Australia to support abuse victims. She has collaborated with government officials and organizations to address issues like coercive control, sexual assault, sex trafficking, child abuse, and systemic religious abuse.

In 2001, during her first and only pregnancy, Waddell experienced a severe deep vein thrombosis and spent two months in the Red Cross Hospital and ICU in Nagano, Japan, as well as at Tokyo University Hospital. Despite medical advice to have an abortion for her safety, she chose to continue the pregnancy. Her son was born healthy in Sydney in 2002, under the care of the Risk Associated Pregnancy Team at St George Hospital.

Between 2012 and 2017, Waddell and Signature Music Design worked in partnership with Messenger International to raise awareness and funds for its Freedom from Trafficking initiative. The partnership supported anti-trafficking operations, victim aftercare, awareness activities and assistance for the ZOE Children’s Home. Waddell’s 2017 EP New Day was created in association with the project.

In 2022 and 2023, the Safe Ministry Process of the Baptist Association of NSW and ACT investigated Alfaro. It made findings that he deceived the Association about his criminal charges for sexual assault, as well as his history of perpetrating abuse against Waddell. As a result, the Baptist Union of NSW removed his ministry endorsement and authorization in March 2023.

== Awards and honours ==
- Winner, Nescafé Big Break, $20,000 prize (1995)
- First Jazz Vocalist in Australian history to complete a master of music degree from the Sydney Conservatorium of Music. (2018)
- Highest Selling Australian Jazz Album in 2022 – The Art of Collaboration (2022)

== Discography ==
=== Albums ===
List of albums, with selected details
Title	Details	Peak chart positions		
Title	Details	ARIA Australian Artist Albums	AUS	AUS Jazz
Take My Love	Released: 1996; Label: Simone Waddell	—	—	—
Make It Happen	Released: 1996; Label: Independent	—	—	—
My Romance	Released: October 2015; Label: Simone Waddell	—	—	—
Surrender	Released: April 2016; Label: Simone Waddell	—	—	—
The Art of Collaboration	Released: April 2022; Label: Simone Waddell	—	—	—
Unforgettable (featuring Paul Grabowsky)	Released: 8 May 2026; Label: Ambition Music / MGM	4	43	2

=== Selected Singles ===
- “Born to Win” (2008)
- “Can Only Wonder”, featuring Pat Powell (2009)
- “Beautiful Angel” (2009)
- “Only a Mother Could” (2010)
- “Till You’re Home” (2010)
- “No One Comes Close” — Zouk Remix (2014)
- “See Her Again” (2015)
- “Calling You”, with Damien Cooper and James Napier (2024)
- “Unforgettable” (12 September 2025)
- “How Do You Keep the Music Playing?”, with Doug Williams (14 November 2025)

=== Extended plays ===
List of EPs, with selected details
Title	Details
Only a Mother Could	Released: 2010; Label:
New Day	Released: 2017; Label: Simone Waddell
Keeping My Peace On	Released: 2018; Label: Simone Waddell
