= Brunswick (1827 ship) =

History

United States
- Name: Brunswick
- Builder: Maine
- Completed: 1827
- Captured: June 1865; burnt

General characteristics
- Tons burthen: 295 (bm)

Brunswick was launched in Maine in 1827. She completed twelve whaling voyages before CSS Shenandoah burnt her in the Bering Straits in June 1865 on Brunswick's 13th voyage.

== Career ==
It is currently unclear what Brunswick did between her launch in 1827 and her first voyage as a whaler in 1834. As a whaler, most of her whale hunting took place in the North Pacific, though she also hunted in the South Pacific and the Indian Ocean on occasion. All the data below is from the American Whaling Voyages Database.

Date out	Date in	Master	Homeport	Cargo
April 1834	April 1836	Heman N. Stewart	Providence, Rhode Island	60 barrels of sperm oil + 1440 barrels of whale oil
July 1836	July 1837	Heman N. Stewart	Providence, Rhode Island	200 barrels of sperm oil + 1200 barrels of whale oil
August 1837	April 1839	Isaac Gardner	Providence, Rhode Island	80 barrels of sperm oil + 1320 barrels of whale oil
August 1839	April 1841	Abraham Manchester	Providence, Rhode Island	280 barrels of sperm oil + 2500 barrels of whale oil
August 1841	July 1843	George F. Champlin	Providence, Rhode Island	150 barrels of sperm oil + 850 barrels of whale oil
6 November 1843	June 1846	John Coggeshall Almy	New Bedford, Maine	248 barrels of sperm oil + 2417 barrels of whale oil + 20,400 pounds of whalebone (Baleen)
September 1846	September 1848	John Coggeshall Almy	New Bedford, Maine	186 barrels of sperm oil + 1959 barrels of whale oil + 17,200 pounds of whalebone
November 1848	May 1851	Thomas J. Johnson	New Bedford, Maine	302 barrels of sperm oil + 2315 barrels of whale oil + 30,000 pounds of whalebone
November 1851	May 1853	Lyman Wing	Dartmouth, Massachusetts	53 barrels of sperm oil + 1595 barrels of whale oil + 25,800 pounds of whalebone
July 1853	July 1856	Henry P. Butler	Dartmouth, Massachusetts	0 barrels of sperm oil + 1265 barrels of whale oil + 19,800 pounds of whalebone
9 October 1856	September 1859	Henry P. Butler	Dartmouth, Massachusetts	677 barrels of sperm oil + 589 barrels of whale oil
26 November 1859	August 1862	Verenus Baker	Dartmouth, Massachusetts	537 barrels of sperm oil + 103 barrels of whale oil + 800 pounds of whalebone
14 October 1862	28 June 1865 (burnt)	Alden Tillinghast White Potter	New Bedford, Massachusetts	30 barrels of sperm oil + 1230 barrels of whale oil + 5,000 pounds of whalebone

== Fate ==
On 28 June, CSS Shenandoah burnt Brunswick, Alden T. Potter, master, in Bering Straits Narrows near Mys Dezhneva (“East Cape”), Chukotka. Brunswick was disabled. The night before she had run into ice and was stove in. A number of other whalers were around her rendering assistance when CSS Shenandoah arrived. Brunswick was beyond salvaging though Captain Potter had heeled her over to keep more water from coming in. The captains of the other whalers had come aboard to purchase at auction her cargo and moveable gear. Two heads of baleen had been sold and transferred to James Maury when a steamer approached. Suggestions by some of the captains that she might be a Confederate raider that had been at Sydney in February were dismissed. Shenandoah launched her boats and captured all 10 whalers. She burnt eight of them; she put the captured crews on two and sent them south. In all, CSS Shenandoah burnt 20 whale ships, occasioning one of the greatest episodes of losses in the region.
