= Ransom bond =

A ransom bond was a legally binding document issued as a promise for future payment for the safety and the release of a captured marine vessel. It was particularly in use during the American Civil War when Confederate States Navy privateers would seize Union merchant vessels and hold them for ransom. Once the bond was posted, the captured commercial ship was generally released and allowed to return to its rightful owners.

The U.S. had not signed the 1856 Declaration of Paris, which outlawed privateering. The Confederates commissioned privateers from many nations, and they preyed on commercial shipping lanes frequented by U.S. vessels. The Federal government finally offered to adopt the declaration's terms during the middle of the war after repeated losses to the Confederates. Many of the ransom bonds were never honored, and the owners of most Confederate privateers were unable to cash in on them when the war ended in a Union victory.

== See also ==
- Commerce raiding § American Civil War
- Letter of marque
