= William Waddell =

William or Willie Waddell may refer to:

- Willie Waddell (1921–1979), Scottish footballer and manager for Rangers F.C.
- Willie Waddell (footballer, born 1919) (1919–1979), less well known Scottish footballer, played for Aberdeen and Kettering Town
- William Bradford Waddell (1807–1872), founder, owner, and operator of the Pony Express
- William B. Waddell (politician) (1857—1942), Canadian politician
- William Bell Waddell (1828–1897), American politician and judge from Pennsylvania
- William Gillan Waddell (1884–1945), classical scholar and translator
