= Waddel Mansion =

Historic house in South Dakota, United States

- U.S. National Register of Historic Places
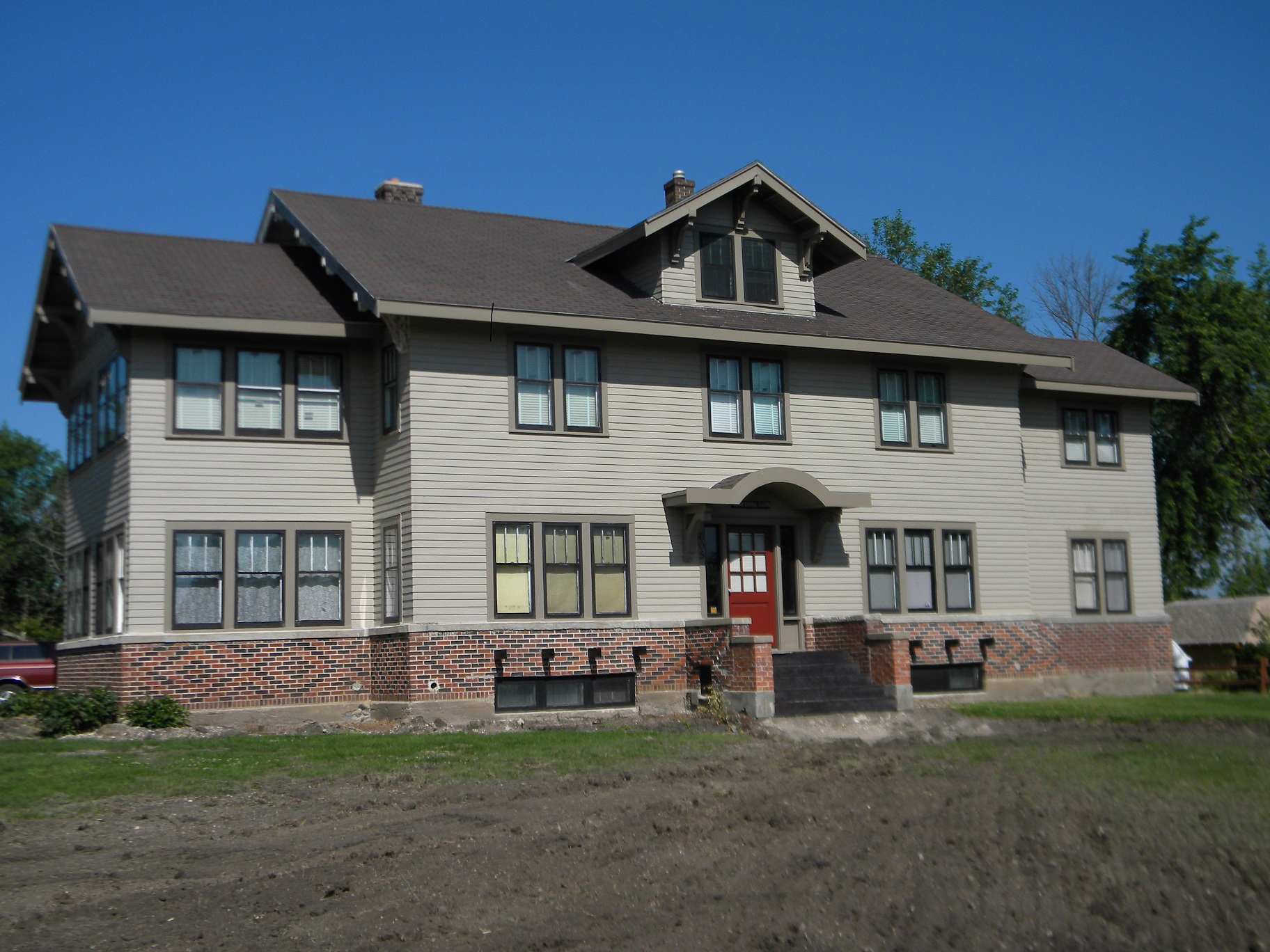

- Location within South Dakota Location within the United States
- Location: 605 W. 5th St., Webster, South Dakota
- Coordinates: 45°19′53″N 97°30′44″W
- Area: 1 acre (0.40 ha)
- Built: 1920
- Architectural style: Bungalow/craftsman
- NRHP reference No.: 94000564
- Added to NRHP: June 3, 1994

The Waddel Mansion is a historic house at 605 West 5th Street in Webster, South Dakota. Built in 1920 by William Waddel, a local lawyer, it was then, and still is, the largest house in the small community. The house has a symmetrical main block, with matching recessed wings on either side. The roof has Craftsman style deep eaves supported by large curving brackets, a detail repeated on dormers and projecting sections. The house was converted into apartments in the 1960s, but care was taken to preserve much of the interior woodwork.

The house was listed on the National Register of Historic Places in 1994.
