= USS Waddell =

Charles F. Adams-class destroyer

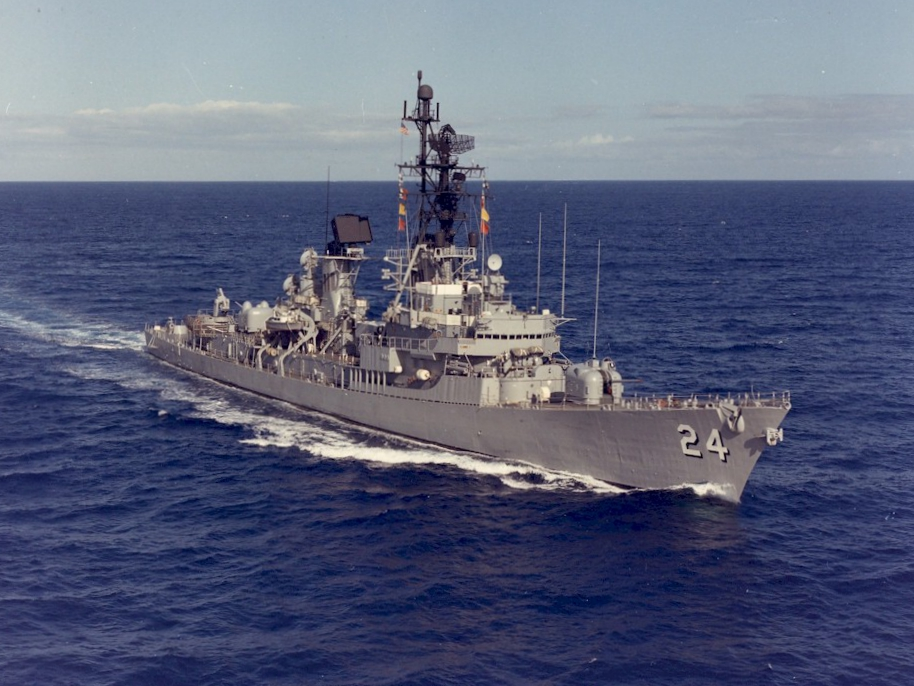
- USS Waddell underway in 1974

History

United States
- Name: Waddell
- Namesake: James Iredell Waddell
- Ordered: 30 November 1960
- Builder: Todd Pacific Shipyards
- Laid down: 6 February 1962
- Launched: 26 February 1963
- Acquired: 21 August 1964
- Commissioned: 28 August 1964
- Decommissioned: 1 October 1992
- Stricken: 1 October 1992
- Identification: Callsign: NHQB; Hull number: DDG-24
- Motto: Semper Confidens; (Always Boldly)
- Fate: Sold to Greece, 1 October 1992
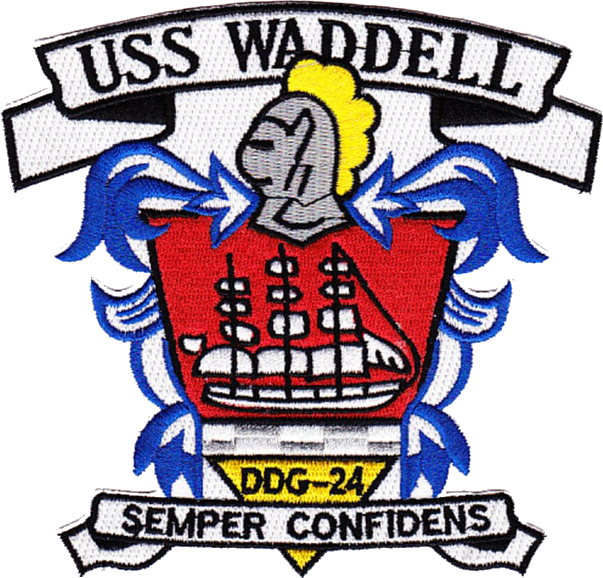
- Badge

Greece
- Name: Nearchos
- Namesake: Nearchos
- Commissioned: 1 October 1992
- Decommissioned: 18 July 2003
- Identification: Hull number: D219
- Fate: Sunk as target, 29 May 2006

General characteristics
- Class & type: Charles F. Adams-class destroyer
- Displacement: 3,277 tons standard, 4,526 full load
- Length: 437 ft (133 m)
- Beam: 47 ft (14 m)
- Draft: 15 ft (4.6 m)
- Propulsion: 2 × General Electric steam turbines providing 70,000 shp (52 MW); 2 shafts; 4 × Combustion Engineering 1,275 psi (8,790 kPa) boilers
- Speed: 33 knots (61 km/h; 38 mph)
- Range: 4,500 nautical miles (8,300 km) at 20 knots (37 km/h)
- Complement: 354 (24 officers, 330 enlisted)
- Sensors & processing systems: AN/SPS-39 3D air search radar; AN/SPS-10 surface search radar; AN/SPG-51 missile fire control radar; AN/SPG-53 gunfire control radar; AN/SQS-23 Sonar and the hull mounted SQQ-23 Pair Sonar for DDG-2 through 19; AN/SPS-40 Air Search Radar
- Armament: 1 Mk 13 single arm missile launcher for RIM-24 Tartar SAM system, or later the RIM-66 Standard (SM-1) and Harpoon antiship missile; 2 × 5 in (127 mm)/54 caliber Mark 42 gun; 1 × RUR-5 ASROC Launcher; 6 × 12.8 in (325 mm) ASW torpedo tubes; 2 x Mark 32 Surface Vessel Torpedo Tubes

USS Waddell (DDG-24) was a Charles F. Adams-class guided missile destroyer in the United States Navy. She was named for Captain James Iredell Waddell CSN (1824-1886) who famously captured several American whaling ships just below the Arctic circle and sailed the Atlantic, Indian, and Pacific Oceans to disrupt American trade. He was the last Confederate officer to surrender which he did in Liverpool, England. The ship was commissioned in 1964 and saw service in the Vietnam War. Decommissioned in 1992, the destroyer was sold to Greece and renamed Nearchos. From 1992-2003, Nearchos served in the Hellenic Navy. In 2006, the ship was used as a target and sunk.

== Construction and career ==
Waddell was laid down by Todd-Pacific Shipbuilding at Seattle, Washington on 6 February 1962. The ship was launched on 26 February 1963 by Mrs. Howard W. Cannon and commissioned on 28 August 1964.

Following trials from October 1964 to May 1965, the new guided missile destroyer conducted shakedown off the west coast into July, before she participated in anti-aircraft and electronic warfare Exercise "Hot Stove" from 26 August to 3 September. During this time, while serving as plane guard for the aircraft carrier Ticonderoga, Waddell rescued Comdr. C. H. Peters, whose plane had ditched off the coast of southern California.

On 28 September 1965, Waddell—in company with Ticonderoga and three destroyers, and acting as flagship for Commander, Destroyer Division (DesDiv) 132—departed her home port, Long Beach, California, bound for her first tour of duty in the Western Pacific (WestPac). After stopping at Pearl Harbor, she proceeded on toward the Philippines.

While en route on 31 October, the American task group received a radio message reporting that Japanese merchantman Tokei Maru had suffered an explosion on board. Detached to render assistance, Waddell sped to the scene and lowered her motor whaleboat containing the squadron doctor. The ship's rescue party arrived on board to find three men of Tokei Maru's complement already dead and another seriously burned. After providing medical assistance which saved the man's life and having left Tokei Maru a supply of medicine to suffice until the Japanese ship could make port, Waddell rejoined her consorts.

=== Vietnam War ===
Only one day after reaching Subic Bay, Waddell got underway on 2 November for the coast of Vietnam and her first deployment to "Yankee Station" W-5, in the Tonkin Gulf. On station with Task Unit (TU) 77.0.2 until the 14th, the ship returned to Subic Bay for brief local operations before sailing back to the combat zone to take her post on the northern search and rescue station (SAR) from 29 November to 29 December.

On 7 December, Waddell steamed alongside Sacramento conducting an underway replenishment on the oiler's port side; while the destroyer Brinkley Bass replenished to starboard of the oiler. During the operation, Brinkley Bass reported a man overboard; and Waddell executed an emergency break-away and doubled back to pick up the man.

Upon completion of this SAR tour, the destroyer sailed via Sasebo to Buckner Bay, Okinawa. She conducted a missile shoot in Ryūkyū waters and then visited Hong Kong. On 31 January 1966, she sailed for Da Nang, en route to a second deployment to the northern SAR area.

At 1410 on 3 February 1966, Waddell was notified that a pilot was possibly downed in their vicinity. While proceeding to investigate, the ship noted "surface action" to port and commenced shore bombardment at 1501. Communist guns replied 14 minutes later. Waddell then trained her guns on the communist batteries. At 1545, while still shelling the communist gun positions, Waddell was straddled by the enemy guns which had found the range. Radical maneuvers enabled the destroyer to retire without damage, and she emerged from the action unscathed.

The following day, after receiving fuel from Sacramento in an underway replenishment while on station, Waddell collided with Brinkley Bass. The damage which Waddell sustained forced her to return to the Philippines for repairs.

Back in Vietnamese waters in late February, Waddell provided gunfire support in the III Corps operating area from 27 February to 11 March, as part of Task Unit 70.8.9. She then returned—via Subic Bay, Guam, Midway, and Pearl Harbor—to her home port, Long Beach, where she arrived on 8 April.

Following a yard period—during which the ship underwent structural repairs—Waddell participated in various fleet and independent exercises off the California coast. Two days after Christmas of 1966, the ship got underway for another WestPac deployment.

Early in 1967, Waddell was again engaged off the Vietnamese coastline. From 2 March to 21 May 1967, the ship displayed "exceptional readiness and effectiveness in all tasks assigned," including gunfire support off South Vietnam; interdiction of North Vietnamese supply traffic along the coast; and gunfire against selected targets in North Vietnam. Coming under hostile fire from shore on one occasion, Waddell returned the fire and inflicted maximum damage on enemy shore batteries while emerging without harm. During her second WestPac deployment in Vietnamese waters, the destroyer fired some 2,000 rounds of ammunition while winning the reputation of being "the busiest ship in the Tonkin Gulf" before heading home.

Waddell made port at Long Beach on 29 May 1967 and operated briefly off the southern California coast. She entered the Long Beach Naval Shipyard on 4 August and commenced an extensive overhaul which lasted through the end of the year 1967 and into February 1968.

She returned to WestPac that summer—with logistics stops at Pearl Harbor and Midway en route—and arrived at her new home port of Yokosuka, Japan, on 1 August 1968. She conducted three tours on the "gun line" off North and South Vietnam into the fall, as well as one tour as plane guard for the attack carrier strike group based around the carriers Coral Sea and Ranger.

On 22 September while operating off the demilitarized zone (DMZ) in company with the cruiser Saint Paul, Waddell participated in a SAR operation. At 0145, an attack bomber splashed near the ship. Both crew members had previously ejected from their stricken jet and parachuted to the sea. Waddell closed to within 5,000 yards (4,600 m) of the mouth of the Cua Vet River and rescued the navigator/bombardier, while St. Paul picked up the pilot.

After completing an overhaul at Yokosuka toward the end of December 1968, Waddell got underway on 7 January 1969, bound for the "gun line." Between 17 and 30 January, she fired two gunfire support missions in the I Corps area for the Army's 101st Airborne Division and one for the 7th and 9th Divisions of the Republic of Vietnam (ARVN) units. After a quick trip via Buckner Bay to Yokosuka, Waddell sped back to the "gun line" in late February and resumed her gunfire support duties on 1 March. There, in the II Corps area, she fired 12 support missions with Task Force "South." She subsequently conducted 79 more gunfire support missions including 12 for Australian units, 11 for ARVN units, and 15 in support of Operation "Sheridan"—in which the United States Army 101st Airborne and an ARVN regiment participated.

During the first week of April, the downing by North Koreans of a Navy EC-121 Connie early-warning intelligence aircraft in the Sea of Japan greatly increased tension in the Far East. Waddell departed the "gun line" at 22 knots, refueled at Buckner Bay, and arrived in the Strait of Tsushima to screen aircraft carriers Ticonderoga and Ranger. She operated in the Sea of Japan until the crisis abated enabling her to head for Yokosuka on the afternoon of 28 April.

Returning to the "gun line," Waddell then lobbed shells at Viet Cong (VC) camps and infiltration points from waters off Phu Quoc Island in the Gulf of Siam in support of Operation "Javelin," before she was assigned to the Mekong Delta region. There, supporting two ARVN divisions, she conducted 19 bombardments against VC structures, bunkers, rest sites, and supply routes.

Subsequently returning to "Yankee Station," she screened the carrier Enterprise in June, as the big carrier conducted strike operations, and returned to waters near the DMZ in mid-July for gunnery support duties.

=== Greek service ===
Waddell was decommissioned and stricken from the Naval Vessel Register on 1 October 1992, sold to Greece and renamed Nearchos after the ancient Cretan admiral Nearchus.

Nearchos was decommissioned from the Greek Navy on 3 June 2003 and scuttled as a target on 29 May 2006.

== Honors ==
Waddell received 11 engagement stars for her service in waters off Vietnam and two Navy Unit Commendations.
