= List of people from Oxford, Mississippi =

The following is a list of people who were born in or associated with Oxford, Mississippi. While it does not include those whose only connection with Oxford is attending the University of Mississippi, it includes faculty and alumni who have resided there and contributed to the life of the community.

== Activists and advocates ==
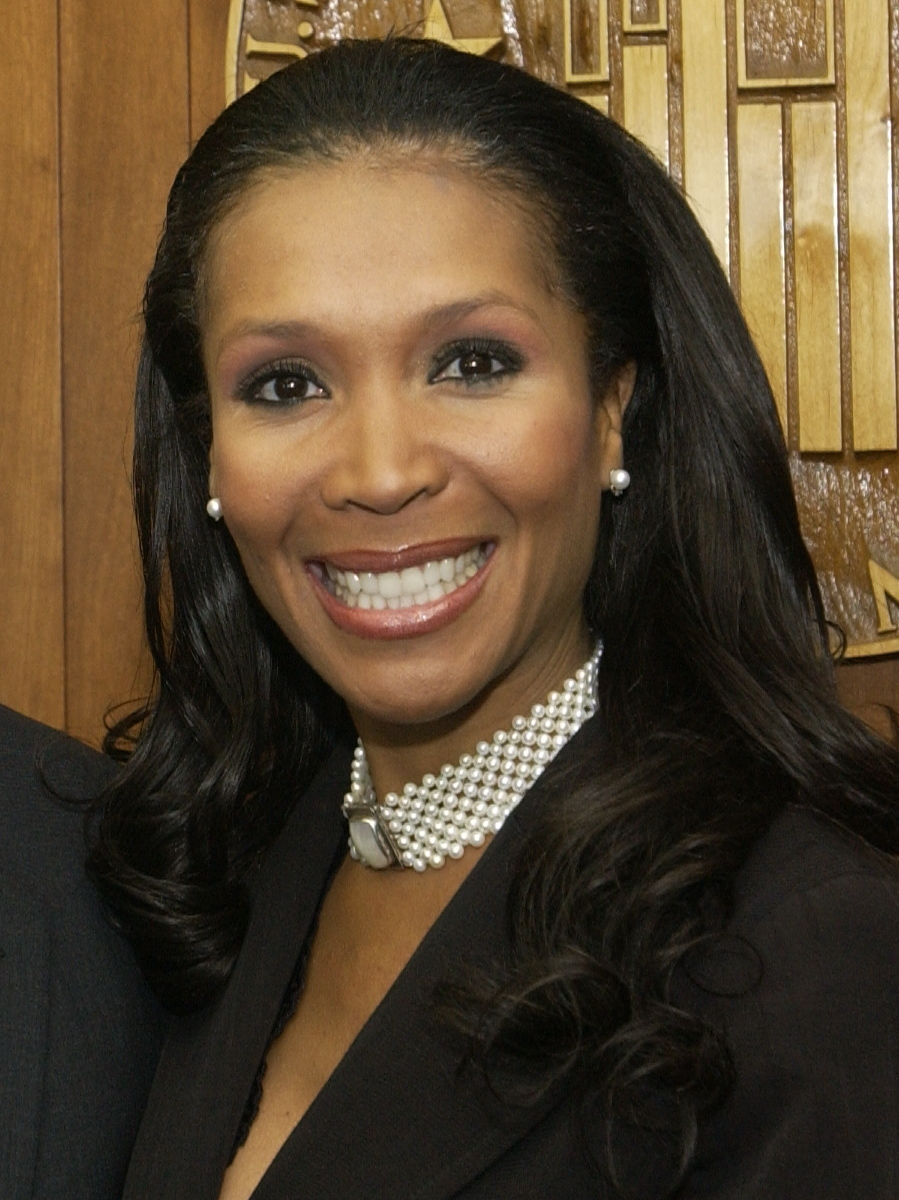
Angela McGlowan

- Nathan Bedford Forrest II (1872–1931), Ku Klux Klan leader, born in Oxford
- James Meredith (born 1933), activist, first African-American student at the University of Mississippi

== Actors and models ==
- Karlous Miller (born 1983), actor, comedian, born in Oxford
- Naomi Sims (1948–2009), fashion model and author, born in Oxford

== Artists and designers ==
- Jere Allen (born 1944), painter
- Henry Clifford Boles (1910–1979), architect
- Theora Hamblett (1895–1977), primitive painter
- John McCrady (1911–1968), painter
- Sulton Rogers (1922–2003), folk artist
- Glennray Tutor (born 1950), photorealist painter
- Dick Waterman (1935–2024), photographer and blues promoter

== Athletes and sports figures ==
- Coolidge Ball, first African-American athlete to play at Ole Miss (basketball)
- Mike Bianco (born 1967), college baseball coach
- Billy Brewer (born 1935), college football coach
- Billy Clay (born 1944), NFL cornerback, born in Oxford
- Steve Freeman (born 1953), NFL defensive back, game official
- Hugh Freeze (born 1969), college football coach
- Jake Gibbs (born 1938), MLB catcher, college coach
- Jennifer Gillom (born 1964), WNBA player/Olympic gold medalist and coach, born in Abbeville
- Sam Kendricks (born 1992), pole vaulter, 2017 world champion, 2016 and 2024 Olympic medalist
- Andy Kennedy (born 1968), college basketball coach
- Don Kessinger (born 1942), MLB shortstop, manager, realtor
- Lane Kiffin (born 1975), NFL and college football coach
- Henry Lamar (1906–1985), football coach, born in Oxford
- Archie Manning (born 1949), NFL quarterback
- Eli Manning (born 1981), NFL quarterback
- DK Metcalf [born 1997), NFL wide receiver, born in Oxford
- Michael Oher (born 1986), NFL offensive tackle
- Jim Poole (1915–1994), NFL wide receiver, born in Oxford
- Connie Price-Smith (born 1962), track and field coach
- Culley Rikard (1914–2000), MLB outfielder, born in Oxford
- Steve Sloan (born 1944), college football coach
- Armegis Spearman (born 1978), NFL linebacker, born in Oxford
- Jim Urbanek (born 1945), AFL defensive tackle, born in Oxford
- Johnny Vaught (1909–2006), football coach
- Todd Wade (born 1976), NFL offensive tackle
- Justin Woodall (born 1987), baseball pitcher, born in Oxford
- Lorenzen Wright (1975–2010), professional basketball player

== Authors ==
- Ace Atkins (born 1970), journalist, novelist
- Howard Bahr (born 1946), novelist
- William Boyle (born 1978), novelist
- Mary Forrest Bradley (1869–1965), historian
- Larry Brown (1951–2004), novelist, short story writer
- Tim Earley (born 1972), poet
- John T. Edge, food writer
- John Faulkner (1901–1963), plain-style writer, brother of William Faulkner
- William Faulkner (1897–1962), novelist, Nobel laureate
- Beth Ann Fennelly (born 1971), poet
- Ann Fisher-Wirth (born 1947), poet
- Richard Ford (born 1944), novelist, short story writer
- Tom Franklin (born 1962), novelist
- David Galef (born 1959), novelist, short story writer, translator
- John Grisham (born 1955), legal thrillers novelist
- Barry Hannah (1942–2010), novelist and short story writer
- Kiese Laymon (born 1974), novelist, memoirist
- Jonathan Miles (born 1971), journalist, novelist
- Willie Morris (1934–1999), author, editor
- Aimee Nezhukumatathil (born 1974), poet
- Chris Offutt (born 1958), author, screenwriter
- J.E. Pitts (1967–2010), poet, editor, artist
- Michael Farris Smith, author
- Wright Thompson (born 1976), sports writer
- Stark Young (1881–1963), playwright, novelist, literary critic, and essayist

== Educators ==
- F.A.P. Barnard (1809–1889), scientist, parson, UM chancellor
- Alexander Lee Bondurant (1865–1937), classicist, football coach
- Glenn Boyce (born 1958), UM chancellor
- Alfred Benjamin Butts (1890–1962), UM chancellor
- William R. Ferris (born 1942), folklorist, chairman of National Endowment for the Humanities
- Porter Lee Fortune Jr. (1920–1989), UM chancellor
- Robert Burwell Fulton (1849–1914), physicist, UM chancellor
- Arthur Guyton (1919–2003), physiologist, author of Textbook of Medical Physiology
- Eugene W. Hilgard (1833–1916), soil chemist
- Thomas Hines (born 1936), architectural historian
- George Frederick Holmes (1820–1897), first UM chancellor
- Alfred Hume (1866–1950), mathematician, UM chancellor
- Samir Husni (born 1953), professor of journalism and leading magazine expert
- Dan Jones (born 1949), physician, UM chancellor
- Winthrop Jordan (1931–2007), historian
- Robert Khayat (born 1938), UM chancellor
- Andrew Armstrong Kincannon (1859–1938), UM chancellor
- Augustus Baldwin Longstreet (1790–1870), attorney, preacher, author, UM president
- Edward Mayes (1846–1917), attorney, UM chancellor
- Louis Pojman (1935–2005), philosopher
- Franklin Lafayette Riley Jr. (1868–1929), historian
- David Moore Robinson (1880–1958), classical archaeologist
- Ronald J. Rychlak (born 1957), attorney, legal scholar
- Alexander P. Stewart (1821–1908), Confederate general, UM chancellor
- R. Gerald Turner (born 1945), UM chancellor
- Jeffrey Vitter (born 1955), computer scientist, UM chancellor
- John Davis Williams (1902–1983), UM chancellor during Meredith crisis

== Entrepreneurs and business leaders ==
- Joseph Whitehead (1864–1906), Coca-Cola pioneer, born in Oxford

== Journalists, media figures ==
- Sharyn Alfonsi (born 1972), journalist and former '60 Minutes' correspondent
- Edward Aschoff (1985-2019), ESPN college football reporter
- Ron Franklin (born 1942), sportscaster
- Lee Habeeb (born 1961), conservative talk radio producer
- Samir Husni (born 1953), magazine industry analyst
- Angela McGlowan (born 1970), Fox News political commentator, born in Oxford
- Shepard Smith (born 1964), Fox News, CNBC anchor
- Wright Thompson (born 1976), senior writer for ESPN.com and ESPN The Magazine
- Curtis Wilkie (born 1940), journalist, historian

== Jurists and lawyers ==
- Neal Brooks Biggers Jr. (1935–2023), U.S. district judge
- Robert Andrews Hill (1811–1900), U.S. district judge
- Charles Bowen Howry (1844–1928), assistant U.S. attorney general, U.S. court of claims judge
- Frank Hampton McFadden (born 1925), U.S. district judge, born in Oxford
- Richard Scruggs (born 1946), attorney
- Phil Stone (1893–1967), attorney

== Military figures ==
- Daniel Isom Sultan (1885–1947), inspector general, U.S. Army, born in Oxford

== Musicians ==
- Bass Drum of Death, garage rock band
- Beanland, jam band
- Miklos Bencze (1911–1992), operatic basso
- Blue Mountain, alternative country band
- R. L. Burnside (1926–2005), blues singer-songwriter, born in Lafayette County
- Phil Cohran (1927–2017), jazz musician, born in Oxford
- Colour Revolt, indie rock band
- Adam Gussow (born 1958), blues harmonica player, teacher
- JoJo Hermann, musician
- Caroline Herring, singer-songwriter
- Dennis Herring, record producer
- Cary Hudson (born 1965), lead singer and guitarist for alternative country band Blue Mountain
- Pepper Keenan (born 1967), metal guitarist, singer, born in Oxford
- Arthur Kreutz (1906–1991), composer
- Kudzu Kings, band
- Jimbo Mathus (born 1967), musician, born in Oxford
- Dent May, alt-musician, ukulele player
- George McConnell, guitarist
- Shannon McNally (born 1973), singer-songwriter
- Laurie Stirratt (born 1967), bassist
- Young Buffalo, indie rock band

== Politicians ==
- Nicole Akins Boyd, state senator
- Thad Cochran (born 1937), U.S. senator
- Ronald D. Coleman (born 1941), U.S. representative (Texas)
- Lewis P. Featherstone (1851–1922), U.S. representative (Arkansas), born in Oxford
- Bill Hawks (born 1944), planter, state senator, born in Oxford
- Charles Bowen Howry (1844–1928), state representative, assistant U.S. attorney general, born in Oxford
- Jay Hughes (born 1963), state representative
- L.Q.C. Lamar (1825–1893), U.S. senator, supreme court justice
- William Lee J. Lowrance (1836–1916), Confederate colonel, merchant, state representative
- Donald Stuart Russell (1906–1998), governor, U.S. senator (South Carolina), born in Lafayette County
- Lee M. Russell (1875–1943), U.S. representative, governor
- William V. Sullivan (1857–1918), U.S. senator
- Gray Tollison (born 1964), state senator
- Jacob Thompson (1810–1885), U.S. representative, secretary of the interior
- Bill Waller (1926–2011), governor, born in Lafayette County
- Jamie L. Whitten (1910–1995), U.S. representative
- Thomas Hickman Williams (1801–1851), U.S. senator, UM secretary-treasurer, "father of the University of Mississippi"
- Samuel Andrew Witherspoon (1855–1915), UM professor, U.S. representative

== Religious figures ==
- Larry M. Goodpaster (born 1948), Methodist bishop
- Duncan M. Gray III (born 1949), Episcopal bishop of Mississippi
- Alexander Preston Shaw (1879–1966), Methodist bishop, born in Abbeville
