= List of chancellors of the University of Mississippi =

The chancellor of the University of Mississippi is the chief administrator of the University of Mississippi in Oxford, Mississippi. The position was previously referred to as "president" until chancellor Frederick Augustus Porter Barnard suggested the change in 1858.

Chancellor John Davis Williams, who served during the Ole Miss riot of 1962 and most of the civil rights movement, attempted to remain neutral, stating "My business is to educate the students sent to me."

== List ==
Key
†	Denotes those who were referred to as president

Table featuring chancellors of the University of Mississippi
Portrait	Name	Term	Notes	Ref.
	George Frederick Holmes	1848–1849		
	Augustus Baldwin Longstreet	1849–1856		
	Frederick Augustus Porter Barnard	1856–1861	Title changed to chancellor in 1858	
	John Newton Waddel	1865–1874		
	Alexander Peter Stewart	1874–1887		
	Edward Mayes	1887–1891		
	Robert Burwell Fulton	1892–1906		
	Andrew Armstrong Kincannon	1907–1914		
	Joseph Neely Powers	1914–1924		
	Alfred Hume	1924–1930		
	Joseph Neely Powers	1930–1932		
	Alfred Hume	1932–1935		
	Alfred Benjamin Butts	1935–1946		
	John Davis Williams	1946–1968		
	Porter Lee Fortune Jr.	1968–1984		
	R. Gerald Turner	1984–1995		
	Robert Khayat	1995–2009		
	Daniel Jones	2009–2015		
	Jeffrey Vitter	2016–2019		
	Glenn Boyce	2019–present		
