= Elizabeth H. West =

American librarian

Elizabeth Howard West
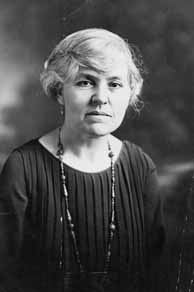
- Born: Elizabeth Howard West; March 23, 1873; Pontotoc, Mississippi, US
- Died: January 4, 1948 (aged 74); Pensacola, Florida, US
- Education: Mississippi University for Women (BA); University of Texas at Austin (BA, MA)
- Occupations: Librarian and educator
- Years active: late 1890s to 1947
- Parents: James Durham West (father); Mary Robertson Waddell (mother)
- Relatives: John Newton Waddel (grandfather); Moses Waddel (great-grandfather)

Elizabeth H. West (March 23, 1873 – January 4, 1948), was a librarian and archivist active in the United States during the early 20th century. West was appointed the Texas State Librarian in 1918, was two time President of the Texas Library Association, co-founder and first President of the Southwestern Library Association, and was the first Head Librarian of Texas Technological College (later Texas Tech University).

== Early years ==
West was born to Rev. James Durham West, D.D., and Mary Robertson (née Waddel) West in Pontotoc, Mississippi on March 27, 1873. West came from a family which not only held education in high regard but which was known for being educators. Her maternal great-grandfather was Moses Waddel, former President of the University of Georgia from 1819 until 1829. Her maternal grandfather was John Newton Waddel, who was Chancellor of the University of Mississippi from 1865 to 1874 and the Chancellor of Southwestern Presbyterian University, the forerunner to present-day Rhodes College from 1879 to 1887 . Her younger brother James R. West, was both a Presbyterian minister and faculty member at the now defunct Chickasaw Female College in Pontotoc, Mississippi.

West moved to Texas when her father, a Presbyterian minister, assumed duties at a church in Bryan when she was twelve years old. She would return to Mississippi to attend college. An avid learner who was intent on attaining as much education as possible, West would go on to earn two bachelor's and one master's degree. She received a bachelor's degree from the Industrial Institute and College in Columbus, Mississippi (now Mississippi University for Women.) She later received both a bachelor's and master's degree in history from the University of Texas at Austin where she focused on the expansion of French and Spanish settlements in North America. Upon completion of her master's degree, West initially worked as a school teacher. She first returned to Mississippi where she taught in a number of rural areas. Later, she would teach in both Bryan and Austin. She began training as a librarian in 1905 as a cataloger at the Texas State Library. West then took a position with the Library of Congress in Washington, DC in 1906 in the catalog division. Later, she would join the manuscript division of the Library of Congress where she compiled the Calendar of the Papers of Martin Van Buren in 1910 and the Calendar of the New Mexico Papers. She did not complete this latter tome as in 1911 she returned to Texas to become archivist of the Texas State Library, a position she would hold until 1915. Her first foray into library administration came in 1915, when she moved south to San Antonio to take the directorship of the San Antonio Public Library. West worked hard to develop and improve the San Antonio library. She began issuing library bulletins on a regular basis, increased holdings, offered new services to special groups, sought recognition for the library's services in local newspapers, and began a public lecture series. Her activities not only enhanced the services and holdings of the library, they also brought attention to West herself. Word of her activities and success spread and in 1918, after only three years, West would become State Librarian for Texas.

== Texas State Librarian ==
At the time of her appointment as Director of the Texas State Library, West was the first woman to ever head a department of the Texas state government and only the second woman in the history of the U.S. to hold such a position. West became state librarian on September 1, 1918, nearly two years before the passage of the 19th Amendment. West entered the position with the same degree of passion and enthusiasm she had shown previously in San Antonio. Over the next seven years, she would develop the state's first library service for the blind, facilitate the development of numerous county public libraries, and to increase overall holdings. West was also notable for lobbying the state for tenure for librarian staff as well as for increased salaries for all library employees. She also worked to lessen the political control of the state library. However, her ongoing frustration with stagnant salaries, budgets, and the tendency of both governors and the state legislature of using the state library as a place to employ patrons of elected officials, led West to resign her position in 1925 to become the first librarian at Texas Tech.

As state librarian, West worked to develop the language of the 1919 County Library Law which meant to facilitate the development of new public libraries across the state. This resulted in the opening of numerous new county public libraries including four in the first two years after the law was passed.

== Services to Diverse Audiences ==
West was instrumental in the development of services for library patrons from diverse backgrounds during her career. She created the first services for Blind patrons at any library in Texas while head of the San Antonio Public Library. She repeated this as State Librarian, commencing services in alternate format books for Blind patrons in September 1919. She acquired a collection of primarily fiction texts in Braille, Moon type, and New York Point. Her efforts were well received, and members of the Texas School for the Blind and Visually Impaired alumni association formed a volunteer service to promote embossed text literacy which was named the Elizabeth H. West Home Teaching Circle in honor of her work.

During her time in San Antonio, West opened services of the public library to African Americans for the first time. These services took the form of four stations inside existing African American schools in the city (public schools in Texas would remain segregated by race for decades to come). In Austin, she extended services to African Americans at the state library as well. It would be decades before African Americans would gain full and unfettered access to libraries in Texas, but West's efforts were instrumental in facilitating the process.

== Texas Tech Librarian ==
Ms. West came to Texas Technological College in 1925 as Head Librarian, a role she would maintain until 1942. At the time, the university consisted of only a handful of buildings and the library was limited to a single room on the first floor of the Administration Building; the total collection including all books, pamphlets, and other materials was roughly 11,000 works. However, the bulk of the collection was not books. By June 1926, the libraries holdings had increased to 13,040 pieces, but included only 1,767 books. Despite such modest beginnings, West envisioned greatness for the library. She was a vocal proponent for the library, its collection and its staff, from the very beginning. She requested additional funds to increase the libraries holdings from the administration at every turn. In correspondence with architect W.W. Watkin over a proposed new library in March 1929, she requested a proposal for a new library design that would hold one million volumes and support ten thousand students. Watkin provided initial sketches for the new structure, but the stock market crash that fall and the ensuing Great Depression halted the plans. West would persist in pursuing funds, and in June 1937, the state provided a $275,000 appropriation for the construction of a new library. West and other university took turns ringing the victory bells in the Administration Building in celebration. Groundbreaking for the new building was held on October 27, 1937, and the cornerstone laid on March 8, 1938.

West left her mark on Texas Tech in other ways. She came up with the name of the university's yearbook, “La Ventana” (The Window); a name inspired by a small window on the east side of the Administration Building which provided a view across the nascent campus. An association of women faculty was also given its name by West: the “Quarterly Club” so named because the group met quarterly and whose membership dues were one quarter. Ms. West founded the Lubbock chapter of the American Association of University Women in 1926.

She would remain the head librarian at Tech until her retirement in 1942. She would later supplement her retirement income by working as a researcher with the Department of History there.

== Later life and death ==
After suffering a heart attack in 1946, West retired from Texas Tech in 1947 and moved to Pensacola, Florida. She died on January 4, 1948.
