= Longstreet Theatre =

Historic theatre at the University of South Carolina

Coordinates: 33.9960°N 81.0294°W

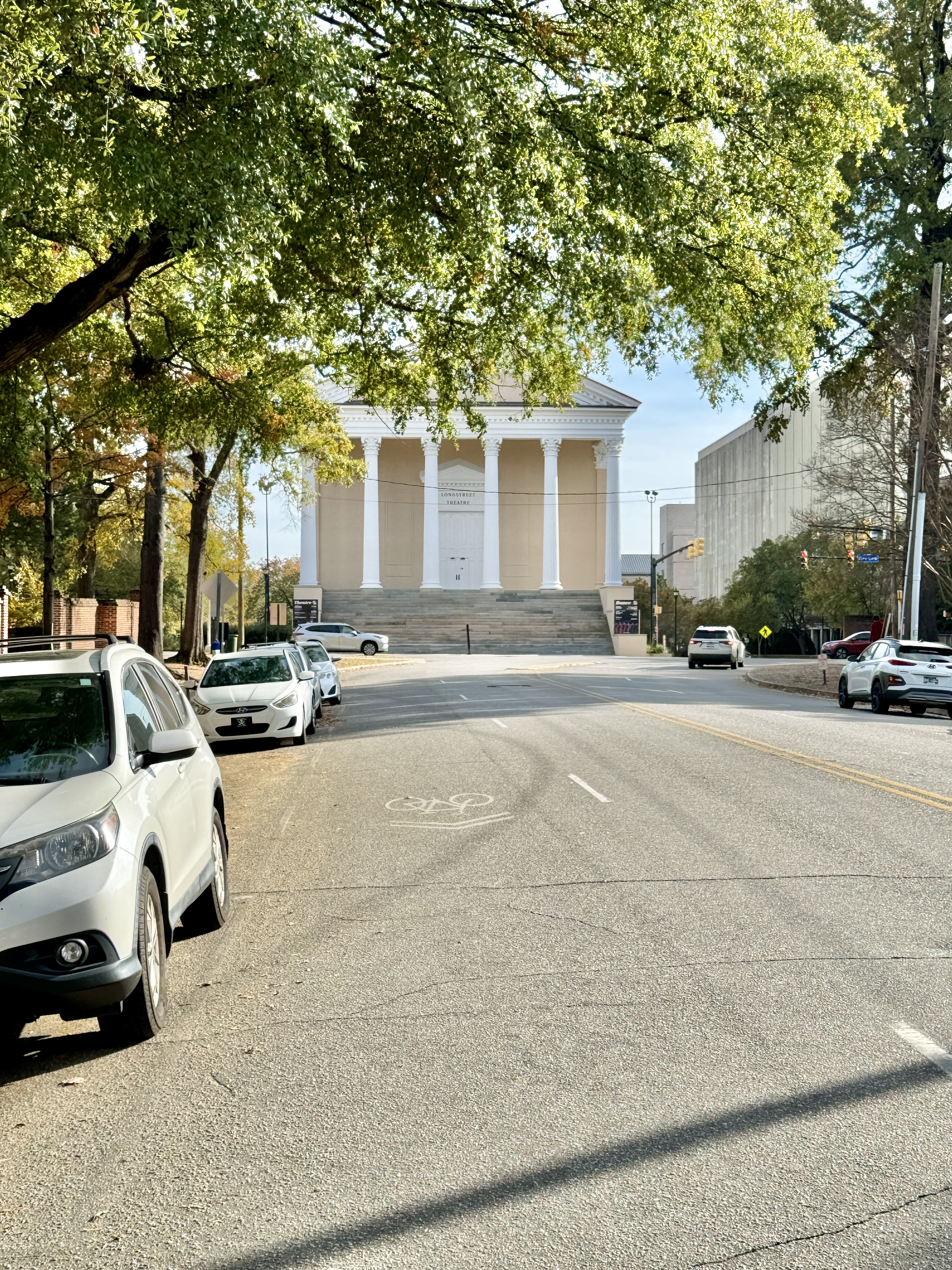
- Longstreet Theatre in 2023
- Interactive map of Longstreet Theatre
- Former names: College Hall; Science Hall; Longstreet Gymnasium
- Address: 1300 Greene Street; Columbia, South Carolina; United States
- Owner: University of South Carolina
- Capacity: 312
- Type: Arena theatre

Construction
- Built: 1852–1855
- Opened: 1855 as College Hall; 1977 as a theatre
- Renovated: 1970s; 1996; 2020s
- Architectural style: Greek Revival
- Architect: Jacob Graves

Tenants
- University of South Carolina Department of Theatre and Dance

Longstreet Theatre is a 312-seat arena theatre and historic Greek Revival building on the campus of the University of South Carolina in Columbia, South Carolina. Completed in 1855 as College Hall, it was intended to serve as a chapel, lecture hall, and auditorium for the institution, then known as South Carolina College. Severe acoustic problems prevented the building from fulfilling those purposes.

During its history, the building has served as a military hospital and morgue, a United States Army arsenal and armory, a science facility, a gymnasium, and a natatorium. It was converted into a theatre in the round during the 1970s and opened for theatrical performances in 1977. It remains a performance and instructional venue for the university's Department of Theatre and Dance.

== History ==
=== Construction and early use ===
The project originated in 1851, when acting college president Francis Lieber proposed either renovating the chapel in Rutledge College or constructing a new chapel elsewhere on the campus. A building committee selected plans by architect Jacob Graves and contracted with James Troy and Thomas H. Wade. The foundation was laid in 1852, with completion initially expected the following year.

Construction was repeatedly delayed. Approximately 400,000 bricks intended for the building were lost in a flood of the Congaree River, materials were difficult to obtain, roof panels were blown off during two storms, and the original contractors defaulted. William Maybin was brought in to complete the work, and College Hall was substantially finished in 1855.

The building's interior proved poorly suited to public speaking. Reverberation made lectures and speeches difficult to understand, and efforts to absorb the sound with carpets, draperies, moss, and hair placed between the floorboards were unsuccessful. The acoustic problems prevented College Hall from becoming the principal chapel and auditorium that the college had planned.

=== Military and academic uses ===
During the American Civil War, College Hall was used as a military hospital and morgue. University historical records state that it was equipped with approximately 300 hospital beds. From 1870 until 1887, the building served as an arsenal and armory for the United States Army.

The university renamed the building Science Hall in 1888 and used it for science departments and laboratories. Part of the building was converted into a gymnasium during the early 1890s. In 1939, the Works Progress Administration funded the addition of an indoor swimming pool behind the original structure, and the College Hall name was restored. The building subsequently accommodated both gymnasium and natatorium functions.

=== Conversion to a theatre ===
The university undertook a major renovation during the 1970s that converted the former gymnasium into an arena theatre. The new interior configuration resolved the acoustic problems that had limited the building's original use. The former swimming pool was decommissioned and converted into space for constructing and storing scenery and theatrical properties.

Longstreet Theatre opened for performances in 1977. Its first production was Samuel Beckett's Waiting for Godot. The theatre-in-the-round arrangement placed the audience around the acting area and allowed speech and small sounds onstage to be heard clearly throughout the auditorium.

An exterior restoration was undertaken in 1996 as part of a university program of campus improvements. Work included repairing deteriorated brickwork and stucco on the walls bordering the building's entrance stairs while preserving its historic appearance.

A later restoration addressed deteriorated architectural elements on the exterior. The work included repairing the cypress architrave, reproducing missing cast-iron leaves on the Corinthian capitals, restoring decorative terra-cotta and stucco elements, and replacing a modern window in the pediment with a circular sash based on archival photographs. As many as 24 layers of paint were removed to determine an appropriate historic finish. The project received a Historic Columbia preservation award in 2024.

=== Naming ===
The university's board of trustees named the building Longstreet Gymnasium in 1968 for Augustus Baldwin Longstreet, who had served as president and a faculty member of South Carolina College from 1856 until 1861. The building became known as Longstreet Theatre after its conversion to a performance venue.

In 2021, the university's Presidential Commission on University History recommended removing Longstreet's name from the building. The commission cited his ownership of enslaved people, his proslavery and secessionist writings, his support for the Confederacy, and the absence of a particular connection between Longstreet and the building's construction or uses. The university continues to operate the venue under the Longstreet Theatre name.

== Architecture and facilities ==
Longstreet Theatre is a temple-form Greek Revival building. Its principal elevation has a raised portico supported by six Corinthian columns, with a broad staircase leading to the entrance. The pediment contains a circular window, and Corinthian pilasters and decorative window hoods appear along the side elevations. Historic Columbia has described it as one of Columbia's notable examples of Greek Revival architecture.

The interior is arranged as a 312-seat arena stage. The Department of Theatre and Dance uses the venue for university productions and as an instructional space for theatre students.
