= People from Oxford (disambiguation) =

People from Oxford are the human population of Oxford, England.

People from Oxford may also refer to:

- List of University of Oxford people
  - University of Oxford#Notable alumni
- List of people from Oxford, Mississippi, U.S.
- Category:People from Oxford, England
- Category:People from Oxford, Alabama
- Category:People from Oxford, Maine
- Category:People from Oxford County, Maine
- Category:People from Oxford, New York

== See also ==
- Oxford (disambiguation)
