= Accounting Research Bulletins =

US documents on accounting problems

Accounting Research Bulletins were documents issued by the US Committee on Accounting Procedure between 1938 and 1959 on various accounting problems. They were discontinued with the dissolution of the Committee in 1959 under a recommendation from the Special Committee on Research Program. In all, 17 bulletins were issued; however, the lack of binding authority over AICPA's membership reduced the influence of, and compliance with, the content of the bulletins. The Accounting Research Bulletins have all been superseded by the Accounting Standards Codification (ASC).

With the permission of the AICPA, the full text of Accounting Research Bulletins has been posted on the website of the J.D. Williams Library of the University of Mississippi.

== List of Accounting Research Bulletins ==
No.	Official title	Issued on
1	General Introduction and Rules Formerly Adopted full-text	1939 September
2	Unamortized Discount and Redemption Premium on Bonds Refunded	1939 September
3	Quasi-Reorganization or Corporate Readjustment—Amplification of Institute Rule No. 2 of 1934	1939 September
4	Foreign Operations and Foreign Exchange	1939 December
5	Depreciation on Appreciation	1940 April
6	Comparative Statements	1940 April
7	Reports of Committee on Terminology	1940 November
8	Combined Statement of Income and Earned Surplus	1941 February
9	Report of Committee on Terminology	1941 May
10	Real and Personal Property Taxes	1941 June
11	Corporate Accounting for Ordinary Stock Dividends	1941 September
11 Revised	Accounting for Stock Dividends and Stock Split-ups	1952 November
12	Report of Committee on Terminology	1941 September
13	Accounting for Special Reserves Arising Out of the War	1942 January
13 Addendum	Limitation of Scope of Special War Reserves	1951 July
14	Accounting for United States Treasury Tax Notes	1942 January
15	Renegotiation of War Contracts	1942 September
16	Report of Committee on Terminology	1942 October
17	Post-War Refund of Excess-Profits Tax	1942 December
18	Unamortized Discount and Redemption Premium on Bonds Refunded (Supplement)	1942 December
19	Accounting under Cost-Plus-Fixed-Fee Contracts	1942 December
20	Report of Committee on Terminology	1942 November
21	Renegotiation of War Contracts (Supplement)	1943 December
22	Report of Committee on Terminology	1944 May
23	Accounting for Income Taxes	1944 December
24	Accounting for Intangible Assets	1944 December
25	Accounting for Terminated War Contracts	1945 April
26	Accounting for the Use of Special War Reserves	1946 October
26 Addendum	Limitation of Scope of Special War Reserves	1951 July
27	Emergency Facilities	1946 November
28	Accounting Treatment of General Purpose Contingency Reserves	1947 July
29	Inventory Pricing	1947 July
30	Current Assets and Current Liabilities; Working Capital	1947 August
31	Inventory Reserves	1947 October
32	Income and Earned Surplus	1947 December
33	Depreciation and High Costs	1947 December
34	Recommendation of Committee on Terminology; Use of Term "Reserve"	1948 October
35	Presentation of Income and Earned Surplus	1948 October
36	Pension Plans; Accounting for Annuity Costs Based on Past Services	1948 November
37	Accounting for Compensation in the Form of Stock Options	1948 November
37 Revised	Accounting for Compensation Involved in Stock Option and Stock Purchase Plans	1953 January
38	Disclosure of Long-Term Leases in Financial Statements of Lessees	1949 October
39	Recommendation of Subcommittee on Terminology; Discontinuance of the Use of the Term "Surplus"	1949 October
40	Business Combinations	1950 September
41	Presentation of Income and Earned Surplus (Supplement to Bulletin No. 35)	1951 July
42	Emergency Facilities—Depreciation, Amortization, and Income Taxes	1952 November
43	Restatement and Revision of Accounting Research Bulletins	1953
44	Declining-Balance Depreciation	1954 October
44 Revised	Declining-Balance Depreciation (Supersedes Accounting Research Bulletin No. 44 issued in October 1954)	1958 July
45	Long-term Construction-type Contracts	1955 October
46	Discontinuance of Dating Earned Surplus	1956 February
47	Accounting for costs of Pension Plans	1956 September
48	Business Combinations (Supersedes chapter 7(c) of Accounting Research Bulletin No. 43)	1957 January
49	Earnings per Share	1958 April
50	Contingencies	1958 October
51	Consolidated Financial Statements	1959 August
