= Moses Waddel =

American educator and minister

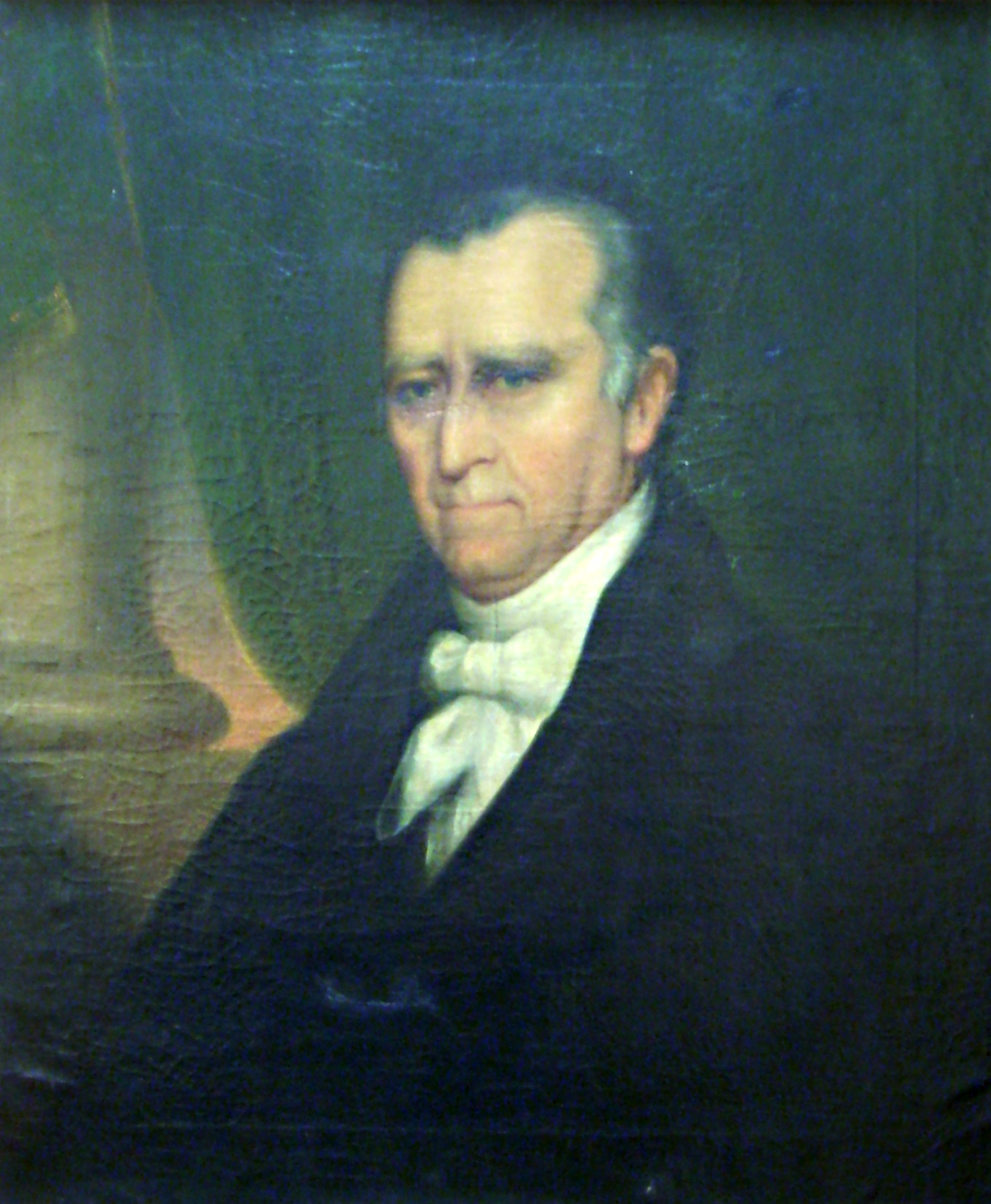

5th President of the University of Georgia
- In office 1819 – August 1829
- Preceded by: Robert Finley
- Succeeded by: Alonzo Church

Personal details
- Born: June 20, 1770 Rowan County, North Carolina, British America
- Died: July 21, 1840 (aged 70) Athens, Georgia, United States
- Relatives: John Newton Waddel (son); John C. Calhoun (brother-in-law); Elizabeth H. West (great-granddaughter)
- Education: Hampden–Sydney College
- Profession: Educator

Moses Waddel (June 20, 1770 – July 21, 1840) was an American educator and minister in antebellum Georgia and South Carolina. Famous as a teacher during his life, Moses Waddel was author of the bestselling book Memoirs of the Life of Miss Caroline Elizabeth Smelt.

== Life and work ==
Born in 1770 in Rowan County, North Carolina, Waddel attended Clio's Nursery north of Statesville, North Carolina, and then went on to graduate in 1791 from Hampden–Sydney College with a Bachelor of Arts (B.A.). He was licensed to preach by the Presbytery of Hanover (of Hanover County, Virginia).

Waddel (pronounced Waddle) began his ministry in the South Carolina Lowcountry; but coming to view Charleston's sophistication as sinful, he departed for the backwoods Upcountry. In 1794, he founded his first 'log cabin academy' at Carmel near Appling in Columbia County, Georgia. In 1801 Waddel moved back across the Savannah River, to Vienna (now defunct), South Carolina, and then to Willington, where he founded the famous Willington Academy in 1804.

These college-preparatory schools trained the future elite of Georgia and South Carolina with a strict classical education, in an environment shrewdly calculated by Waddel to foster self-reliance and self-motivation. Graduates generally entered university at the junior year. The Debating Society in Augustus Baldwin Longstreet's Georgia Scenes takes place at Willington and, as written by Longstreet himself, "is as literally true as the frailty of memory would allow it to be."

In 1819, Waddel further enlarged his fame with Memoirs of the Life of Miss Caroline Elizabeth Smelt. Difficult reading today for its overwrought and pious sentimentality, Memoirs was a smash bestseller reprinted in the U.S. and Great Britain.

The 1820 United States Federal Census lists sixteen enslaved people in the household of Moses Waddel, eight females, and nine males, including nine children under the age of fourteen.

Waddel's Willington Academy was considered to be the high point of his career. It was often called 'Eton in the woods,' as a comparison to Eton College in the UK which produced the leadership of Britain. Students were required to memorize, translate, and recite 250 lines of classic Greek or Latin every night – and they did, often several times that much. Later, the record was held by SC Governor George McDuffie, who once recited 2,212 lines of Horace.

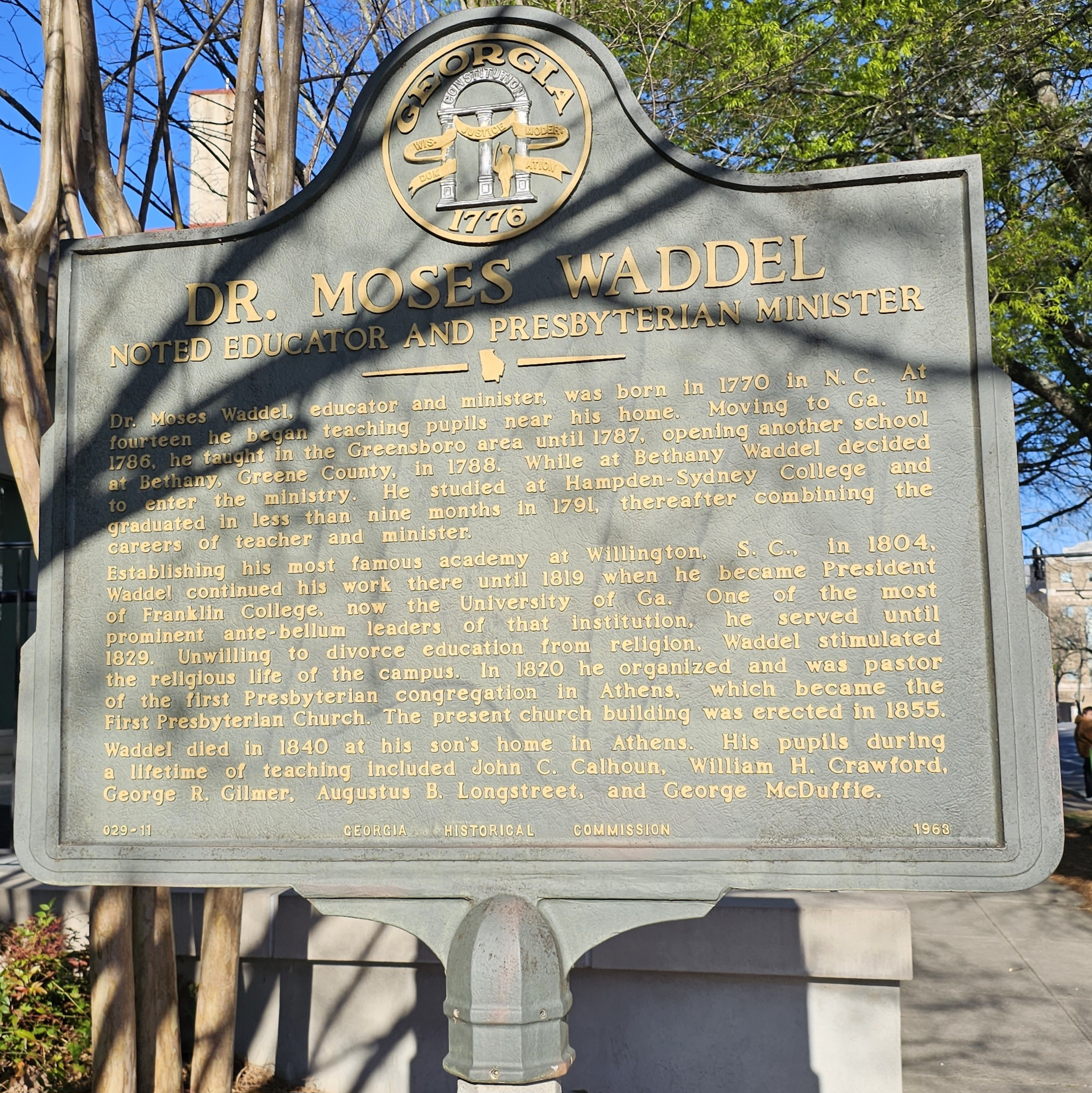
A historical marker for Waddell near the First Presbyterian Church in Athens, Georgia

Considered the foremost educator in the South, Waddel "received an urgent and persistent invitation" to revitalize the University of Georgia (UGA) in Athens. He became the fifth president and served from 1819 until his resignation in August 1829. Waddel found the school "nearly extinct, consisting of only seven students with three professors." With great industry he scoured the state and soon built enrollment to one hundred students. He acquired money for the library, garnered state funding, and raised three new buildings: Philosophical Hall (1821), New College (1823) and Demosthenian Hall (1824). As said by Longstreet, "The effect of his coming to this Institution was magical. It rose instantly to a rank which it had never held before, and which, I am happy to add, it has maintained ever since."

Waddel was said to possess an ordinary intellect, but he combined it with an iron will. This 'Cromwell of the Classroom' produced a generation of Southern leaders including William H. Crawford, Madison's Secretary of the Treasury and 1824 US presidential candidate; Hugh S. Legaré, editor of the Southern Review; Governor and U.S. Senator George McDuffie of South Carolina; Judge James L. Petigru, the Unionist who famously stated that South Carolina was too small to be a nation and too large for an insane asylum; Governor George Rockingham Gilmer of Georgia; Judge Augustus Baldwin Longstreet, author of Georgia Scenes and president of two universities, and John C. Calhoun. Andrew Jackson is said to have (perhaps mistakenly) claimed Waddel's influence.

According to Dr James McLeod's book The Great Doctor Waddel, the list of students from all of Waddel's schools includes: two vice-presidents, three secretaries of state, three secretaries of war, one assistant secretary of war, one US attorney-general, ministers to France, Spain and Russia, one US Supreme Court justice, eleven governors, seven US senators, thirty-two members of the US House of Representatives, twenty-two judges, eight college presidents, seventeen editors of newspapers or authors, five members of the Confederate Congress, two bishops, three brigadier-generals, and one authentic Christian martyr. At one time, five SC governors in a row had been his students. In the presidential election of 1824, three of the five candidates were his students; and when the electoral dust settled, the winning president and vice-president were both South Carolinians who had studied under Waddel – Andrew Jackson and John C. Calhoun.

Waddel died on July 21, 1840, in Athens, Georgia. His granddaughter Elizabeth Howard West would become the State Librarian of Texas, the first woman to lead a Texas state agency and the second woman in U.S. history to hold such a post. She would go on to be the first librarian at Texas Tech University.

Waddell Street in Athens was named in his honor.

== Notes ==
Preceded by Robert Finley	President of the University of Georgia; 1819 – 1829	Succeeded by Alonzo Church
