= Maurice Garland Fulton =

American historian

- Born: December 3, 1877; Lafayette County, Mississippi, U.S.
- Died: February 12, 1955 (aged 77); Roswell, New Mexico, U.S.
- Resting place: South Park Cemetery, Roswell, New Mexico, U.S.
- Education: University of Mississippi
- Occupations: Historian, English professor
- Employer: New Mexico Military Institute
- Spouse: Vaye McPhearson Callahan
- Parent(s): Robert Burwell Fulton and Annie Rose Garland Fulton
- Relatives: Landon Garland (maternal grandfather)
- Military career
- Allegiance: United States
- Branch: United States Army
- Service years: 1918
- Rank: Colonel

Maurice Garland Fulton (December 3, 1877 – 1955) was an American historian and English professor. He was a professor of English and History at the New Mexico Military Institute for three decades. He was the (co-)author or (co-)editor of several books, and "an authority on the Lincoln County War and Southwestern history."

== Early life ==
Maurice Garland Fulton was born on December 3, 1877, in Lafayette County, Mississippi. His father, Robert Burwell Fulton, served as the seventh chancellor of the University of Mississippi in Oxford, Mississippi. His maternal grandfather, Landon Garland, was a slaveholder who served as the second president of Randolph-Macon College in Ashland, Virginia, from 1836 to 1846, the third president of the University of Alabama in Tuscaloosa, Alabama, from 1855 to 1865, and the first chancellor of Vanderbilt University in Nashville, Tennessee, from 1875 to 1893. Fulton had three brothers and a sister.

Fulton graduated from the University of Mississippi, where he earned a Ph.B. in English in 1898, followed by an A.M. in 1901. He attended graduate school at the University of Michigan, but came short of earning a PhD.

== Career ==
Fulton taught at his alma mater, the University of Mississippi, from 1900 to 1901, followed by the University of Michigan until 1903, the University of Illinois in 1904, and back at the university of a year. He later taught at Centre College from 1905 to 1909, followed by Davidson College until 1918. He took a hiatus to serve as a colonel in the United States Army during World War I in 1918, and returned to academia, teaching at Indiana University from 1919 to 1922. He was a professor of English and History at New Mexico Military Institute in Roswell, New Mexico, from 1922 to 1955. Fulton taught the courses about William Shakespeare and Charles Lamb as well as Mississippi poet Irwin Russell. He was the chair of the English department at NMMI.

Fulton (co-)authored or (co-)edited several books, and he became "an authority on the Lincoln County War and Southwestern history." He edited the writings of Theodore Roosevelt, who served as the 26th president of the United States from 1901 to 1909, and Pat Garrett's biography of Billy the Kid. He edited a history of New Mexico and two volumes of Josiah Gregg's diary and letters with Paul Horgan. He was active in the Chaves County Historical Society.

== Personal life and death ==
Fulton married Vaye McPhearson Callahan. He died on February 12, 1955, in Roswell, New Mexico, at 77. He was buried in South Park Cemetery, Roswell, NM. His papers are at the University of Arizona.

== Selected works ==
- Fulton, Maurice G. (1912). Expository Writing: Materials for a College Course in Exposition by Analysis and Imitation. New York: Macmillan. OCLC 367449881.
- Fulton, Maurice G., ed. (1914). College Life, Its Conditions and Problems: A Selection of Essays for Use in College Writing Courses. New York: Macmillan. OCLC 561071500.
- Fulton, Maurice G. (1917). Southern Life in Southern Literature. Boston: Ginn and Co. OCLC 320938032.
- Fulton, Maurice G. (1918). National Ideals and Problems; Essays for College English. New York: Macmillan – via Internet Archive.
- Fulton, Maurice G., ed. (1920). Roosevelt's Writings: Selections from the Writings of Theodore Roosevelt. New York: Macmillan. OCLC 17993757.
- Garrett, Pat (1927). Fulton, Maurice G. (ed.). Authentic Life of Billy the Kid. New York: Macmillan. OCLC 459886698.
- Fulton, Maurice G. (1930). Charles Lamb in Essays and Letters. New York: Macmillan. OCLC 2093756.
- Fulton, Maurice G. (1933). Writing Craftsmanship: Models and Readings. New York: Macmillan. OCLC 1060526160.
- Fulton, Maurice G.; Horgan, Paul, eds. (1937). New Mexico's Own Chronicle; Three Races in the Writings of Four Hundred Years. Dallas, Texas: B. Upshaw and Co. OCLC 49597488.
- Fulton, Maurice G.; Horgan, Paul, eds. (1944). Diary and Letters of Josiah Gregg. Norman, Oklahoma: University of Oklahoma Press. OCLC 500377799.
- Fulton, Maurice G. (1968). History of the Lincoln County War. Tucson, Arizona: University of Arizona Press. OCLC 166484144.
