= John Davis Williams =

American academic administrator (1902–1983)

John D. Williams

Chancellor of the University of Mississippi
- In office 1946–1968
- Preceded by: Alfred Benjamin Butts
- Succeeded by: Porter Lee Fortune Jr.

President of Marshall College
- In office 1942–1946
- Preceded by: James Edward Allen
- Succeeded by: Stewart Harold Smith

Personal details
- Born: December 25, 1902 Newport, Kentucky, U.S.
- Died: May 29, 1983 (aged 80) Oxford, Mississippi, U.S.
- Education: University of Kentucky; Teachers College, Columbia University

John Davis Williams (December 25, 1902 – May 29, 1983) was an American university administrator who served as the Chancellor of the University of Mississippi and President of Marshall College. He served as chancellor from 1946 to 1968.

== Biography ==
He was born in Campbell County, Kentucky, in 1902. He received a B. A. degree from the University of Kentucky in 1926, and served as principal of a number of rural Kentucky schools before accepting a post as head of his alma mater's laboratory school in 1935. He earned a doctorate at the Columbia University Teachers College in 1940, and was appointed President of Marshall College, in Huntington, West Virginia, in 1942. His successful tenure at Marshall, accomplished despite wartime budget constraints, led to his appointment as Chancellor of the University of Mississippi in 1946.

Amenable toward multiculturalism while at Marshall College, Williams conformed to the segregationist agenda then prevailing among Ole Miss trustees upon his appointment; among the African-Americans barred from admission in subsequent years was Medgar Evers. He privately felt that these policies conflicted with his Methodist background and was the only head of a Mississippi university at the time to publicly question segregation. He was named chair of the National Association of State Universities and Land-Grant Colleges in 1955.

The most significant milestone of Williams' tenure at Ole Miss was the September 30, 1962, admission of James Meredith, an African-American student, following a court ruling. Williams kept the university open during the ensuing unrest, and helped facilitate the arrival of African-American students on campus subsequently. Numerous expansion and modernization works were carried out during Williams' tenure, including the construction of the new university library (1951), schools of engineering and medicine (1955), married student housing (1959), school of biology (1963), the Tad Smith Coliseum (1966), school of mathematics (1968), and the "twin towers" dormitory complex (1968), among other works. He stepped down in 1968, and died in 1983.

The university library at Ole Miss was named after him.

== See also ==
- List of presidents and principals of Marshall University
