= Southwestern Library Association =

Professional association for librarians in the Southwestern US and Mexico

- Nickname: SWLA
- Formation: October 26, 1922
- Dissolved: 1983
- Parent organization: American Library Association

The Southwestern Library Association (SWLA) was a professional organization for librarians and library workers based in the southwestern United States and in Mexico. It was headquartered in Stillwater, Oklahoma after being founded on October 26, 1922, in Austin, Texas. The organization was designed primarily to serve library associations and librarians in the states of Arizona, Arkansas, Louisiana, New Mexico, Oklahoma, and Texas.

Elizabeth H. West, the State Librarian of Texas at the time, was the first president of SWLA. Dorothy Amann, president of the Texas Library Association from 1921 to 1922 was instrumental in visiting the states bordering Texas to encourage their participation. Lillian Gunter, founder of the Cooke County Library, was also a SWLA co-founder.

From 1959 to 1967, the SWLA published the Southwestern Library Association Newsletter. The organization was perhaps best known for its SLICE program (Southwestern Library Interstate Cooperative Endeavor) for interstate networking and continuing education.

In 1983, Louisiana joined the Southeastern Library Association. Shortly thereafter, the SWLA dissolved due to dwindling financial support.

== See also ==
- List of libraries in the United States
