= William Longstreet =

American inventor

William Longstreet (c.1760 in New Jersey – 1814 in Georgia) was an inventor. He made a steamboat and improved the cotton gin.

Born in Allentown, New Jersey, he moved to Augusta, Georgia. On 26 September 1790, he addressed a letter to Thomas Telfair, then governor of Georgia, asking his assistance, or that of the legislature, in raising funds to enable him to construct a boat to be propelled by the new power. This was three years before Robert Fulton's letter to the Earl of Stanhope announcing his theory “respecting the moving of ships by the means of steam.” Failing to obtain public aid at that time, Longstreet's invention remained for several years in abeyance until, at last securing funds from private sources, he was enabled to launch a boat on Savannah River, which moved against the current at the rate of five miles an hour. This was in 1807, a few days after Fulton had made a similarly successful experiment on the Hudson River.

Besides this invention, Longstreet patented a valuable improvement in cotton gins, called the “breast roller,” moved by horse power, which entirely superseded the old method. He set up two of his gins in Augusta, which were propelled by steam and worked admirably; but they were destroyed by fire within a week. He next erected a set of steam mills near St. Mary's, Georgia, which were destroyed by the British in 1812. These disasters exhausted his resources and discouraged his enterprise, though he was confident that steam would soon supersede all other motive powers.

He was the father of Southern author Augustus Baldwin Longstreet and grandfather of Confederate General James Longstreet.

== Notes ==
- Wilson, J. G.; Fiske, J., eds. (1900). "Longstreet, William" . Appletons' Cyclopædia of American Biography. New York: D. Appleton.
