= Robert Burwell Fulton =

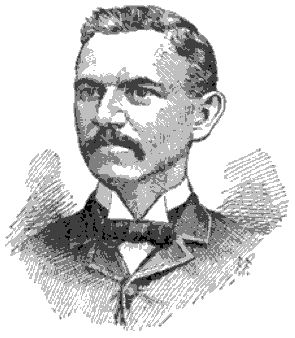

7th Chancellor of the University of Mississippi
- In office 1892–1906
- Preceded by: Edward Mayes
- Succeeded by: Andrew Armstrong Kincannon

Personal details
- Born: April 8, 1849 Sumter County, Alabama, US
- Died: May 29, 1919 (aged 70) New York City
- Spouses: Annie Rose Garland Fulton (m. 1871; died 1893) Florence Thompson (m. 1903)
- Children: Landon Garland Fulton; Louise Garland Fulton; Robert Garland Fulton
- Education: University of Mississippi

Robert Burwell Fulton (April 8, 1849 – May 29, 1919) was an American university administrator. He served as the seventh chancellor of the University of Mississippi in Oxford, Mississippi from 1892 to 1906.

== Biography ==
=== Early life ===
He was born in Sumter County, Alabama on April 8, 1849. His parents, William Fulton and Elizabeth K. Frierson, were farmers. He was homeschooled until the age of 13, then attended Pleasant Ridge Academy in Greene County, Alabama. He entered Ole Miss as a sophomore in 1866 and graduated first in a class of 21 in 1869. He later earned an M.A. in 1873. He was a member of the Chi Psi Fraternity's Alpha Gamma chapter.

=== Career ===
He taught in Alabama and in New Orleans, Louisiana. In 1871, he became Assistant Professor of Physics and Astronomy at the University of Mississippi in Oxford, Mississippi. By 1875, he was a full Professor. Fulton was a member of the Mississippi Historical Society in 1890. He became acting president in December 1891 when Edward Mayes resigned, and was elected permanently in June 1892. He went on to serve as its seventh Chancellor from 1892 to 1906.

Additionally, he served as president of the National Association of State Universities for five years.

=== Administration ===
Fulton closed the preparatory department of the University of Mississippi in 1892. In his 1892 report to the trustees, he noted that the University of Mississippi had received only one tract of land from Congress through the Ordinance of 1787. In response to his lobbying, Congress granted an additional 23,040 acres in Harrison and Jackson counties. The revenue paid for a power house, a women's dormitory, a hospital, and campus utilities.

He then started Peabody Normal Institute summer courses using funding from the Peabody Education Fund in 1893, and over 450 teachers attended the first. He would later go on to create the School of Education. In 1894, he started a program affiliating the university with nearly 50 high schools, letting their students bypass entrance exams.

=== Personal life ===
He married Annie Rose Garland Fulton (1843-1893), the daughter of Landon Garland (1810-1895), who served as the second President of Randolph-Macon College in Ashland, Virginia from 1836 to 1846, third president of the University of Alabama from 1855 to 1865, and first chancellor of Vanderbilt University from 1875 to 1893. They had two sons and one daughter who died in infancy, and one son who survived: Maurice Garland Fulton (Professor of English at New Mexico Military Institute in Roswell, New Mexico).

Annie died in 1893, and he remarried to Florence Thompson in 1903. They had no children.

He died of heart disease at the Hotel Lorraine on Fifth Avenue and Forty-fifth Street in New York City on May 29, 1919.

Fulton Chapel (also known as Fulton Turner Hall) at the University of Mississippi was named in his honor. Designed by architects Bem Price and C.H. Lindsley and built in 1927, the building is in the Classical Revival style.
