= Committee on Accounting Procedure =

American standards organization

The Committee on Accounting Procedure (CAP) was the first private sector organization that had the task of setting accounting standards in the United States. It was a committee run by the American Institute of Accountants (now known as the American Institute of Certified Public Accountants). CAP is the predecessor of the Accounting Principles Board, itself a predecessor to the Financial Accounting Standards Board. Its formation and activities were early efforts to rationalize and legitimize the reporting of business performance. However, it is widely regarded as having failed.

George O. May was vice chairman of the committee from 1937 to 1945.

The committee published Accounting Research Bulletins.
