= R. Gerald Turner =

President of SMU in Texas

Gerald Turner
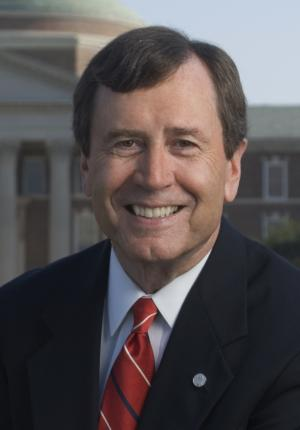

President of Southern Methodist University
- In office June 5, 1995 – June 1, 2025
- Preceded by: A. Kenneth Pye
- Succeeded by: Jay Hartzell

Chancellor of the University of Mississippi
- In office April 2, 1984 – June 5, 1995
- Preceded by: Porter Lee Fortune Jr.
- Succeeded by: Robert Khayat

Personal details
- Born: Robert Gerald Turner; November 25, 1945 (age 80)
- Education: Lubbock Christian University (AA); Abilene Christian University (BS); University of Texas, Austin (MA, PhD)
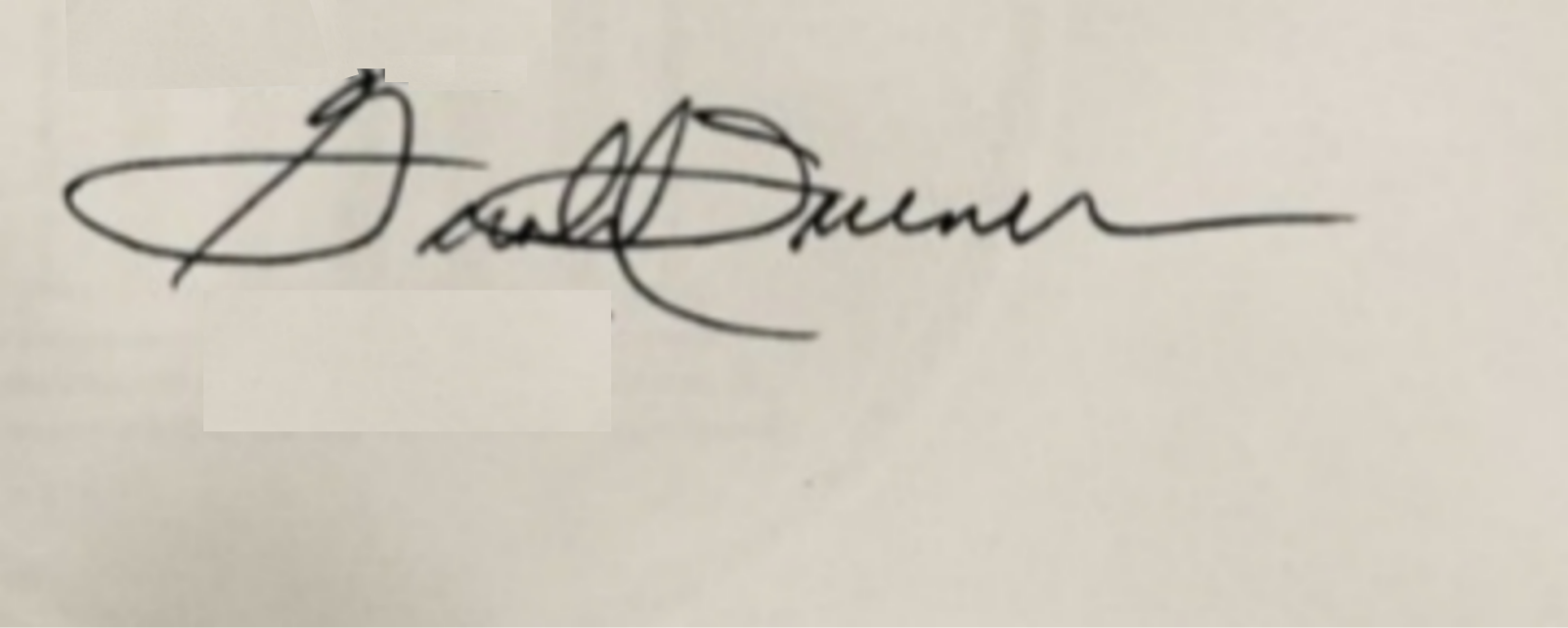
- Signature

Robert Gerald Turner (born November 25, 1945) is an American academic administrator. He served as the tenth president of Southern Methodist University (SMU), holding office from 1995 to 2025. Previously, he was the Chancellor of the University of Mississippi.

At SMU, Turner helped rehabilitate the university's national reputation following the infamous 1980s football scandal and NCAA death penalty. His 30-year tenure as president, the longest in SMU history, was notable for massive campus expansion, growth in the endowment, the university's joining of the Atlantic Coast Conference (ACC), and attempts to legally separate the university from the United Methodist Church. During his career, Turner was one of the most highly-compensated university presidents in the United States.

Despite his successes, Turner drew criticism for failing to translate his fundraising prowess into significant improvements in the national rankings of SMU and its constituent colleges. He also courted controversy for his heavy-handed approach to certain issues, such as bringing George W. Bush Presidential Center to SMU and the university's response to the COVID-19 pandemic.

Before coming to SMU, Turner served as Chancellor of the University of Mississippi ("Ole Miss") from 1984 to 1995. Under his leadership, Ole Miss increased its endowment from $80 million to $640 million.

== Early life and education ==
Turner was born in 1945 in New Boston, Texas. He received an A.A. from Lubbock Christian College, and graduated from Abilene Christian University with a B.S. in psychology in 1968. He then graduated from the University of Texas at Austin with an M.A. and a Ph.D.

== Career ==
From 1975 to 1979, Turner was a professor at Pepperdine University at Malibu, California. He was the vice president of the University of Oklahoma from 1979 to 1984.

Turner served as the chancellor of the University of Mississippi from 1984 to 1995. At 38, Turner was considered among the youngest university presidents. While at Ole Miss, he fired Billy Brewer, the longtime popular football coach, due to allegations of recruiting violations. Successful programs under Turner's leadership grew the school's endowment from $8 million to $64 million.

Since 1995, Turner has served as the president of Southern Methodist University. He helped lead the school's efforts to attract the George W. Bush Presidential Center, to be located on the SMU campus. In 2016, he earned $3.3 million, and was the third-highest-paid of all U.S. private-university presidents. In 2008, he earned $2.7 million.

Turner was co-Chair of the Knight Commission on Intercollegiate Athletics and Chair of the National Collegiate Athletic Association Subcommittee on Presidential Leadership of Internal and External Constituencies. He serves on the boards of the Methodist Hospital Foundation and the Salvation Army of Dallas, and has served on the boards of United Way of Dallas, the First Broadcasting Corporation, J. C. Penney (where he was part of the critical decision to change J.C. Penney's century old sales and discount program), Kronos Worldwide, American Beacon Funds, California Federal Preferred Capital Corporation, American Advantage Funds, Skytel Communications, ChemFirst Inc, the ChemFirst Foundation, AMFM, the First Mississippi Corporation, etc.

== Personal life ==
Turner and his wife, Gail, a native of Graham, Texas, have two daughters. He is a member of the Churches of Christ.

== See also ==
- Institute of Child Nutrition
