= George Frederick Holmes =

American academic administrator

1st Chancellor of the University of Mississippi
- In office 1848–1849
- Preceded by: n/a
- Succeeded by: Augustus Baldwin Longstreet

Personal details
- Born: c. 1820 British Guyana
- Died: November 4, 1897
- Spouse: Lavellette Holmes
- Children: 2 sons, 3 daughters
- Education: University of Durham
- Profession: Charlottesville, Virginia

George Frederick Holmes (c. 1820 – November 4, 1897), emigrated to the United States where he taught history and literature and became the first Chancellor of the University of Mississippi (from 1848 to 1849). From 1857 until his death, Holmes taught literature, history and political economy at the University of Virginia and became known for textbooks designed for use in schools in the southern United States.

== Early life and education ==
George Frederick Holmes was born in 1820 in British Guyana, either in its capital Georgetown or the surrounding Demerera region. In 1836, he attended the University of Durham in England, but left for Quebec in 1837 without taking a degree.

== Career ==
In 1838, Holmes emigrated to the United States and taught in Caroline County, Virginia. He moved to Macon, Georgia, where in addition to teaching, he began to study law. In 1840, Holmes moved to South Carolina where he taught first in Walterboro, then in Orangeburg. Holmes also continued to study law and was admitted to the South Carolina bar in 1842, but did not practice as a lawyer for any significant period. Instead, he resumed his teaching career.

In 1845, Holmes became a professor of Ancient Languages at Richmond College, now known as the University of Richmond. In 1847, Holmes became Professor of History and Political Economy at the College of William and Mary.

Holmes then moved to Mississippi and from 1848 to 1849 taught and served as the first President of the University of Mississippi.

In 1857, Holmes returned to Virginia as professor of history and general literature at the University of Virginia in Charlottesville. He wrote in opposition to Harriet Beecher Stowe’s antislavery novel Uncle Tom’s Cabin in 1858. In 1860, he owned one enslaved 12 year old Black boy.

In 1882, years after the American Civil War and after creating a school of English language and literature, the University of Virginia reduced Holmes' teaching duties, relieving him of literature courses, so he only taught history and political economy. In 1889 Holmes was appointed an adjunct professor of history, and taught classes in political economy and the science of society. He also privately printed his lectures on the science of society. The Southern Quarterly Review, the Southern Literary Messenger, DeBow's Review, and the Methodist Quarterly Review published articles Holmes wrote. He corresponded with Auguste Comte and John C. Calhoun. He supported state rights, African-American slavery, and an end to tariffs.

== Personal life ==
Holmes married Virginian Lavalette Holmes and they had at least two sons (Henry born 1855 and Frederick born 1858) as well as three daughters (Mary Ann born 1846, Letticia born 1849 and Isabella born 1856).

== Death and legacy ==
Holmes died in Charlottesville in 1897.

== Books written by G.F. Holmes ==
- The Southern Pictorial Primer, or First-Fifth Reader (1866)
- A School History of the United States of America, From the Earliest Discoveries to the Year 1870 (1871)

Academic offices
Preceded by Incumbent	Chancellors of the University of Mississippi; 1848-1849	Succeeded by Augustus Baldwin Longstreet
