= Samir Husni =

- Born: March 8, 1953 (age 72); Tripoli, Lebanon
- Education: University of North Texas; University of Missouri
- Spouse: Marie Mikael
- Children: 3
- Website: mrmagazine.com

Samir Husni (Arabic سمير حصني) is a Lebanese magazine analyst. He was born in Tripoli, Lebanon then immigrated to the United States in 1978.

He earned a master's degree in journalism from the University of North Texas in 1980 and a Ph.D. in journalism from the University of Missouri-Columbia in 1983.

== Work ==
Husni has been called a leading expert in magazine publishing.

He manages the Magazine Innovation Center at the University of Mississippi.

He is co-author of the text Managing Today's News Media: Audience First (2015), which suggests news organization management decisions should always begin with consideration of the impact on audience. Authors Husni, Debora Halpern Wenger and Hank Price introduce "The 4Cs Strategy" to describe how customers, control, choice, and change are all critical factors in managing successful media organizations.
