= Joseph Neely Powers =

Joseph Neely Powers (March 15, 1869 – October 4, 1939) was Superintendent of Education in Mississippi and served as the Chancellor of the University of Mississippi from 1914 to 1924, and from 1930 to 1932.

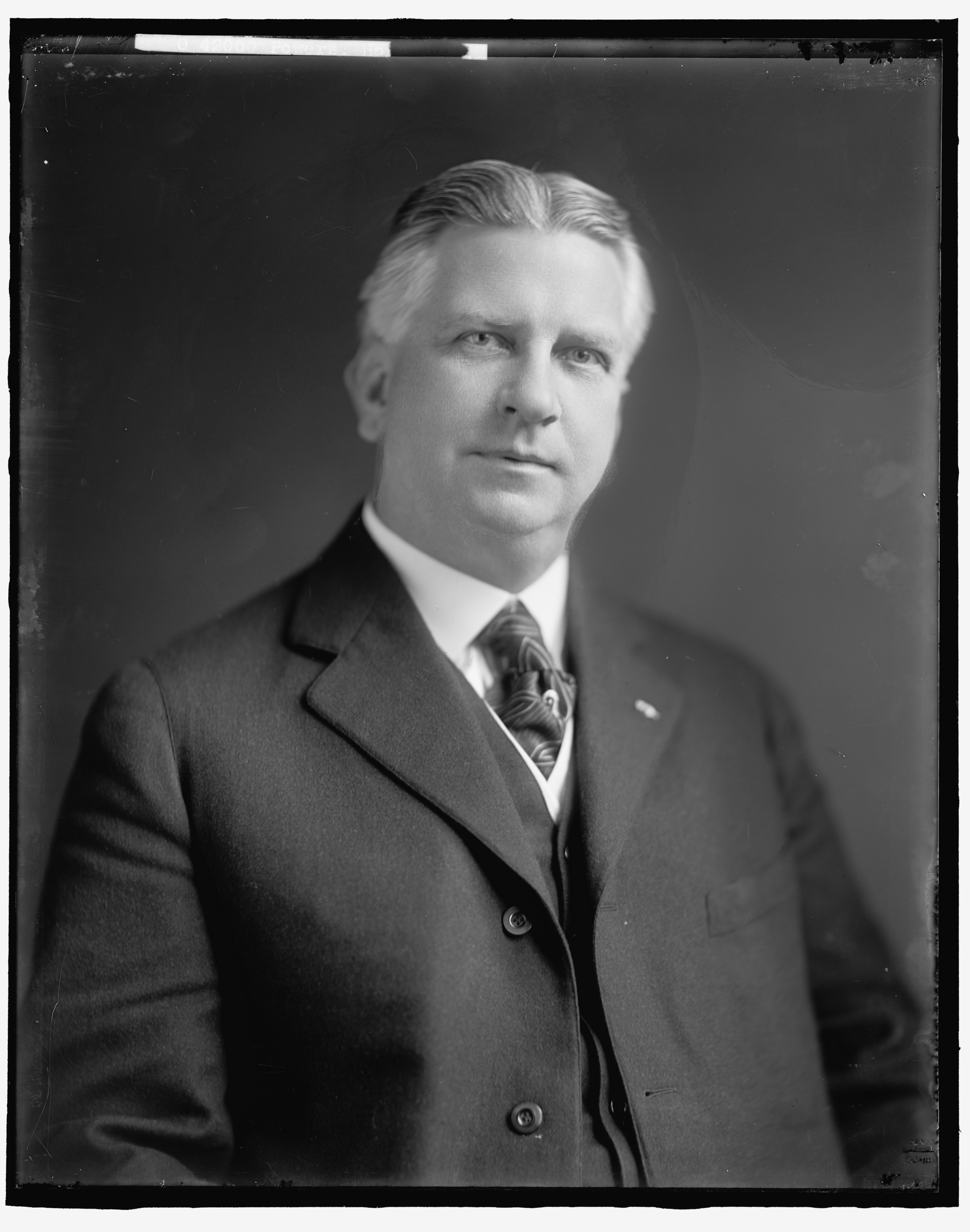
Powers

== Biography ==
He was born in Havana, Alabama in 1869. He attended the Louisville Medical College, now known as the University of Louisville School of Medicine, the University of Chicago, and the University of Mississippi. He was appointed as Superintendent of Education in Mississippi by Governor James K. Vardaman. As such, he established agricultural high schools, later known as community colleges. He served as Chancellor of the University of Mississippi from 1914 to 1924, and from 1930 to 1932. As chancellor, he enabled William Faulkner to enroll without a high school diploma. He also helped found the University of Southern Mississippi. He died in Jackson, Mississippi.
