= Chickasaw Female College =

Women's college in Pontotoc, Mississippi, US

Martha Washington Home, Chickasaw Female College

Chickasaw Female College was a women's college in Pontotoc, Mississippi.

It was founded in 1851 as the Pontotoc Female College, taken over by the Presbyterian church in 1853, and closed in 1936. During the American Civil War the college was used as a hospital by both the Union Army and the Confederate States Army.

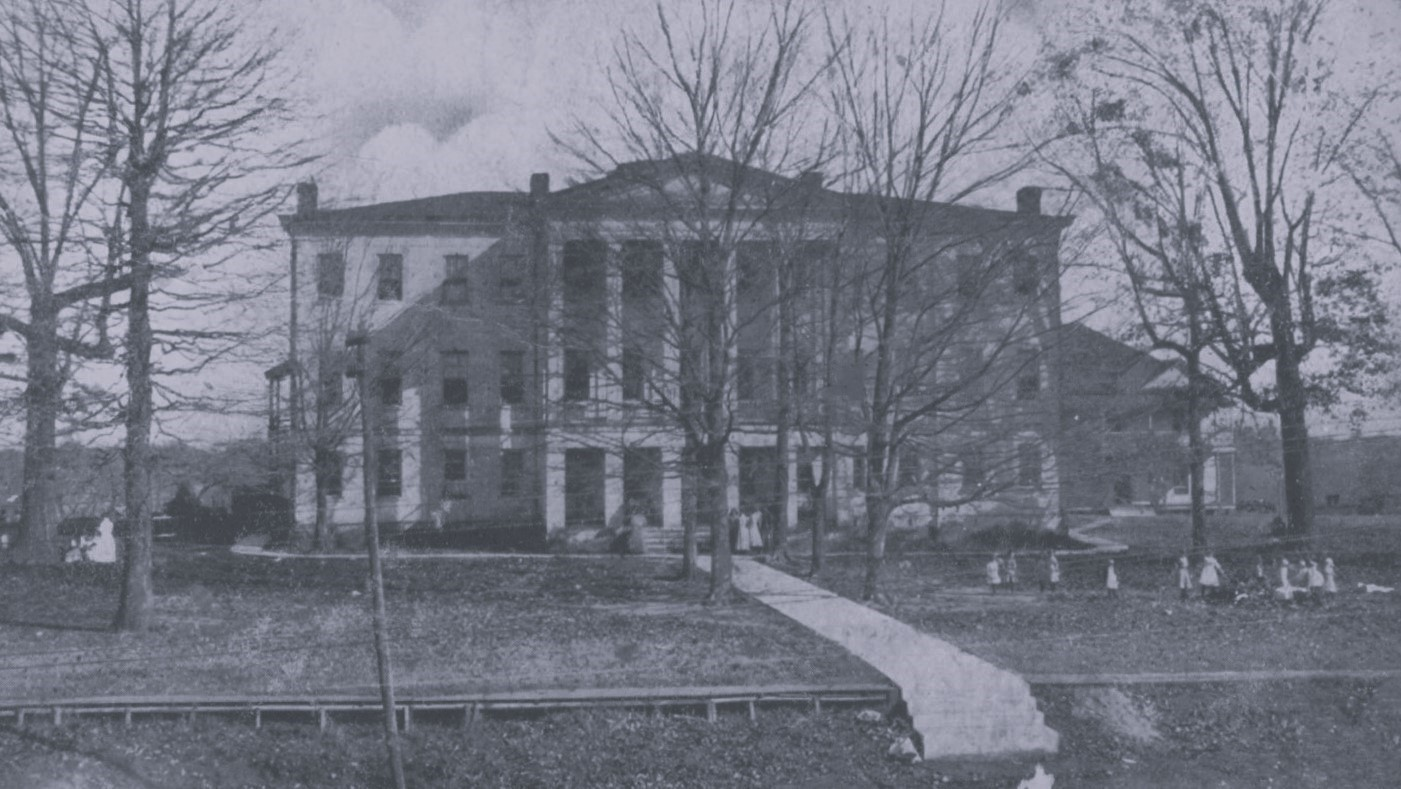
Chickasaw Female College academic building with Martha Washington Home in background.
