= Frederick A. P. Barnard =

American educator and academic

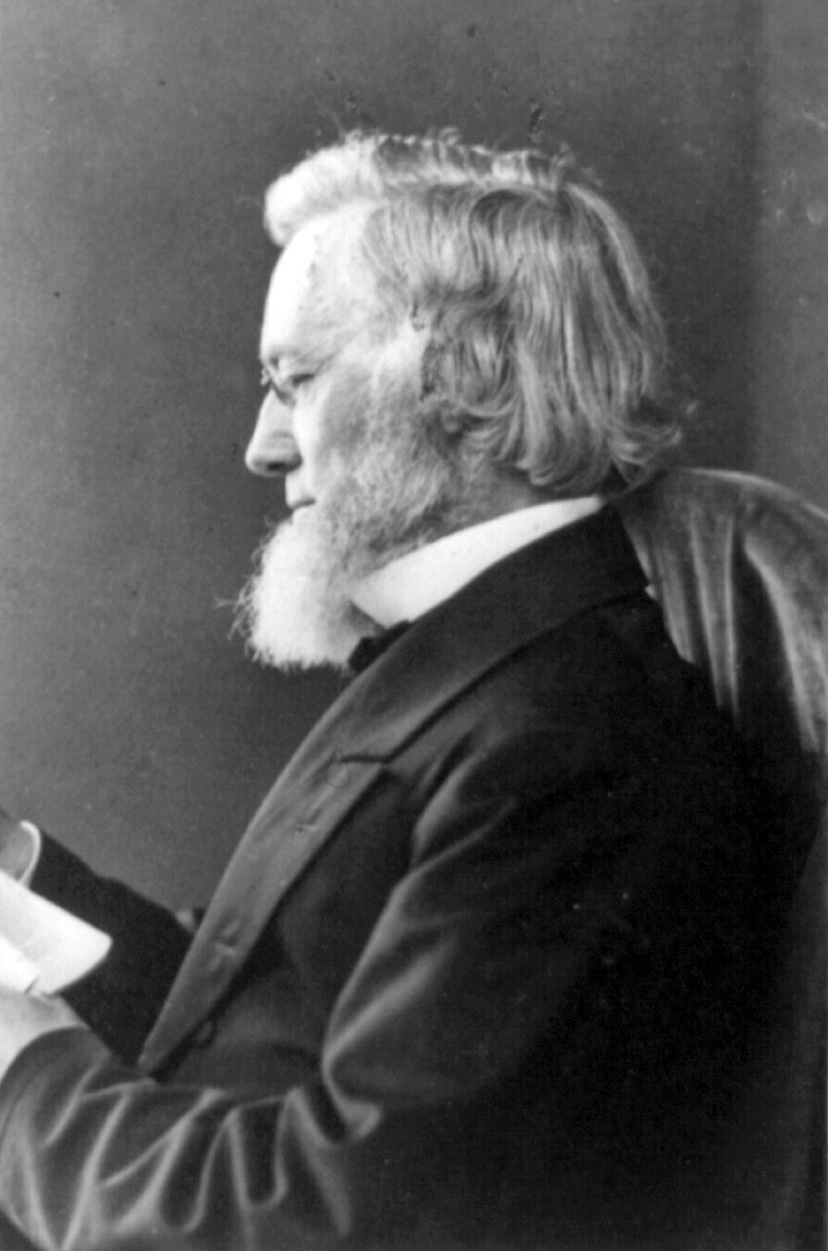

10th President of Columbia University
- In office 1864–1889
- Preceded by: Charles King
- Succeeded by: Seth Low

3rd Chancellor of the University of Mississippi
- In office 1856–1861
- Preceded by: Augustus Baldwin Longstreet
- Succeeded by: John Newton Waddel

Personal details
- Born: May 5, 1809 Sheffield, Massachusetts, U.S.
- Died: April 27, 1889 (aged 79) New York City, U.S.
- Spouse: Margaret McMurray
- Relations: John G. Barnard (brother)
- Education: Yale University

Frederick Augustus Porter Barnard (May 5, 1809 – April 27, 1889) was an American academic and educator who served as the 10th President of Columbia University. Born in Sheffield, Massachusetts, he graduated from Yale University in 1828 and served in a succession of academic appointments, including as Chancellor of the University of Mississippi from 1856 to 1861. He assumed office as President of Columbia University in 1864, where he presided over a series of improvements to the university until his death in 1889. Barnard College was named after him. He was also known as an author of academic texts.

== Early life ==
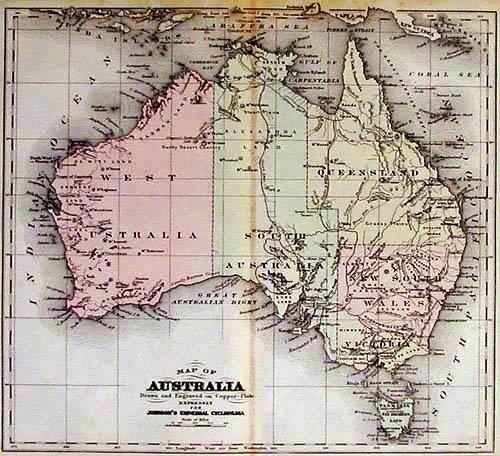
Map of Australia compiled by Arnold Henry Guyot and Frederick Augustus Porter Barnard

He was born on May 5, 1809, in Sheffield, Massachusetts. His brother, John G. Barnard, was a career officer in the United States Army who served as the superintendent of the United States Military Academy and later as a general in the Union Army during the American Civil War. Barnard had a hereditary form of deafness that intensified in his later years, as did his brother and most of his family.

He graduated from Yale University in 1828, where he pursued astronomical studies and was a member of the Linonian Society.

== Career ==
Barnard became a tutor at Yale following his graduation in 1828. He later served as a teacher at the American Asylum for the Deaf and Dumb at Hartford, Connecticut between 1831 and 1832, and at the New York Institute for the Instruction of the Deaf and Dumb between 1832 and 1838.

He taught at the University of Alabama in various capacities from 1838 to 1854, where he was a professor of mathematics and natural philosophy until 1848, and a professor of chemistry and natural history thereafter. He also filled the chair of English literature during his time at the university.

Barnard was ordained as a deacon in the Protestant Episcopal Church in 1854. In the same year he took up position as a professor of mathematics and natural philosophy at the University of Mississippi, where he eventually assumed the office of chancellor from 1856 through to the outbreak of the American Civil War in 1861, when he resigned due to his Unionist sympathies. During his time at the university he was subject to scrutiny from the board of trustees for taking the testimony of a slave against that of a student who had allegedly assaulted her.

He was sent to Labrador in 1860 to observe an eclipse of the sun; in 1862 he worked on the reduction of Gilliss's observations of stars in the Southern Hemisphere, and in 1863 he supervised the publication of maps and charts of the United States Coast Survey. He was elected as an Associate Fellow of the American Academy of Arts and Sciences in 1860; as president of the American Association for the Advancement of Science in 1866, as a member of the Board of Experts of the American Bureau of Mines in 1865, and as a member of the American Institute in 1872. He also gained membership in the American Philosophical Society in 1871.

=== Columbia College ===
He served as the 10th President of Columbia College (now Columbia University) in New York City, holding office from 1864 to 1889, longer than that of any of his predecessors. During this period the college experienced rapid growth. New departments were established; the elective system was greatly extended, greater provisions were made for graduate study and original research, and enrolment increased from approximately 150 students to over 1000.

Barnard himself served as a scholar of English and the classics, and as an expert in the fields of mathematics, physics, and chemistry. He was known as a skilled public speaker, with his annual reports to the Board of Trustees including valuable discussions of educational problems.

He also served as the co-editor-in-chief of Johnson's New Universal Cyclopaedia (1876), alongside Arnold Henry Guyot. Other texts authored by Barnard, include Treatise on Arithmetic (1830), Analytical Grammar with Symbolic Illustration (1836), Letters on Collegiate Government (1855), History of the United States Coast Survey (1857), Recent Progress in Science (1869), and The Metric System (1871).

He died on April 27, 1889, in New York City. In his will, the bulk of his estate was left to Columbia College.

He was buried in his hometown of Shefffield, Massachusetts.

== Legacy ==
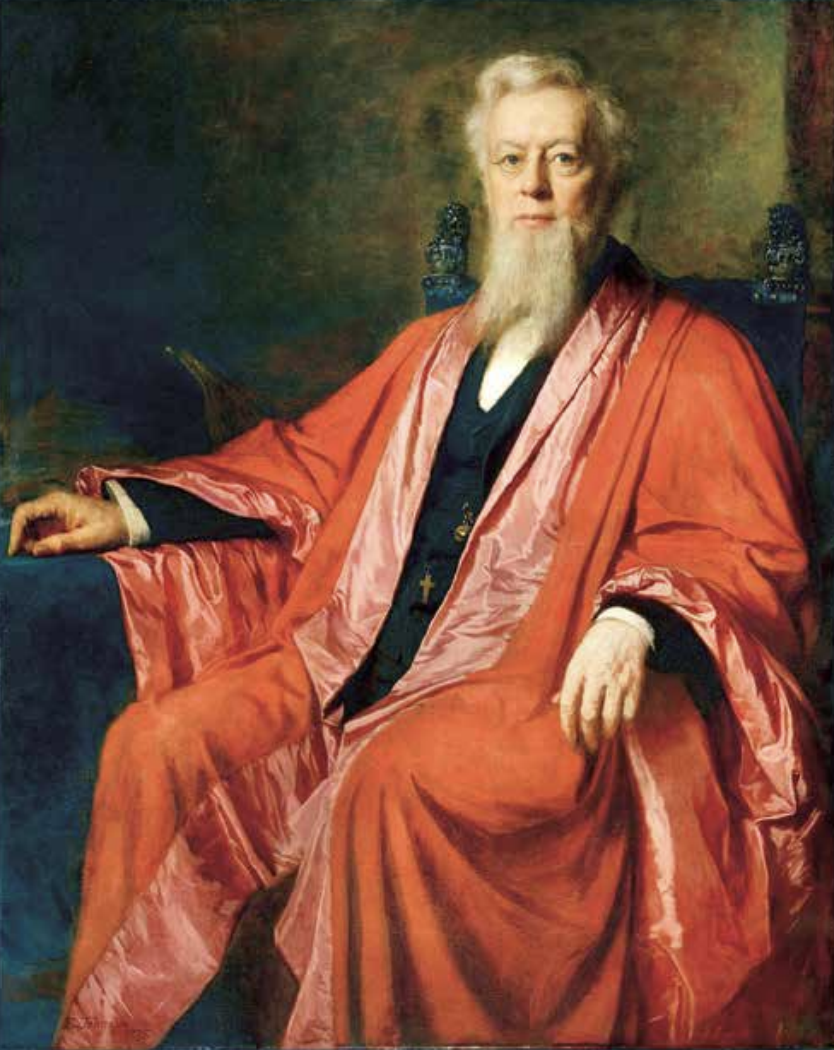
Eastman Johnson's portrait of Frederick Augustus Porter Barnard, 1886

Barnard strove to extend educational privileges to women that were normally reserved for men, and the establishment of Barnard Women's College, following his death, was done so in his honor.

Oliver-Barnard Hall, on the University of Alabama campus, is partly named in his honor.

Barnard Observatory, one of the few buildings of the University of Mississippi that survived the American Civil War, is also named in his honor.

=== Barnard Medal for Meritorious Service to Science ===
The Barnard Medal for Meritorious Service to Science was established in 1889 according to the instructions of his will, and has been awarded by Columbia University every five years, beginning in 1895.

== Writings ==
- Barnard, Frederick A. P. (1851). No just cause for a dissolution of the Union in any thing which has hitherto happened; but the Union the only security for southern rights. Tuscaloosa, Alabama.

== See also ==
- Presidents of the American Association for the Advancement of Science

Academic offices
| Preceded by Augustus Baldwin Longstreet | Chancellors of the University of Mississippi; 1856–1861 | Succeeded by John Newton Waddel |
| Preceded by Charles King | President of Columbia College; 1864–1889 | Succeeded by Seth Low |
