= John Newton Waddel =

4th Chancellor of the University of Mississippi
- In office 1865–1874
- Preceded by: Frederick A. P. Barnard
- Succeeded by: Alexander P. Stewart

Chancellor of Rhodes College
- In office 1879–1887
- Preceded by: John Bunyan Shearer

Personal details
- Born: April 12, 1812 Willington, South Carolina, U.S.
- Died: January 9, 1895 (aged 82) Clarksville, Tennessee, U.S.
- Spouse: Martha Ann (née Robertson) Waddel
- Relatives: Moses Waddel (father); Elizabeth H. West (granddaughter)
- Education: University of Georgia

John Newton Waddel (born Willington, South Carolina, April 2, 1812; died 1895) was the Chancellor of the University of Mississippi from 1865 to 1874.

== Biography ==
Waddel was the son of Moses Waddel and Eliza Woodson Waddel. He was a graduate of the University of Georgia (1829). He worked as a cotton farmer in Alabama, taught at the Willington Academy in South Carolina, and established the Montrose Academy in Jasper County, Mississippi. A Presbyterian minister, he preached to the Confederate Army during the American Civil War. He also taught at Synodical College. He then became the Chair of the Ancient Languages Department at the University of Mississippi in Oxford. From 1865 to 1874, he served as its chancellor. He resigned to become secretary of education for the Southern Assembly of the Presbyterian Church in Memphis, Tennessee. He would later serve as Chancellor of Rhodes College from 1879 to 1887.

Waddel was married to Martha A. Robertson in 1832.

== Bibliography ==
- Memorials of academic life: being an historical sketch of the Waddel family, identified through three generations with the history of the higher education in the South and Southwest (1891)
