= Alfred Hume =

Chancellor of the University of Mississippi

- Born: December 1, 1866; Beech Grove, Coffee County, Tennessee
- Died: December 25, 1950 (aged 84); Oxford, Mississippi
- Burial place: Oxford Memorial Cemetery
- Title: Chancellor Emeritus of the University of Mississippi
- Spouse: Mary Hill Ritchey (m. 1891)

Academic background
- Education: Vanderbilt University

Academic work
- Discipline: Mathematics, Civil Engineering
- Sub-discipline: Astronomy
- Institutions: University of Mississippi, Rhodes College
- Notable works: Some Physical Constants (1890)

Alfred Hume (1866–1950) was the chancellor of the University of Mississippi from June 1924 to June 1930, and from September 1932 to June 1935.

== Biography ==
Alfred Hume was born on December 1, 1866, in Beech Grove, Coffee County, Tennessee. He married Mary Hill Ritchey in 1891. He received a Doctor of Science from Vanderbilt University in 1890. In 1890, he began teaching mathematics at the University of Mississippi and authored Some Physical Constants, a work on physical measurements. He later expanded to teaching civil engineering, serving as acting professor of civil engineering, and astronomy, while also acting as a long-time chair of the Department of Mathematics. In 1905, he became dean of the College of Liberal Arts, a role he held until 1920. He served as acting chancellor from June 1906 to June 1907, and as chancellor from June 1924 to June 1930, and again from September 1932 to June 1935, during which he prevented Governor Theodore G. Bilbo from moving Ole Miss to Jackson, Mississippi. In 1935, he was named chancellor emeritus. Hume taught mathematics at Rhodes College (then known as Southwestern, The College of the Mississippi Valley) from 1930 to 1932. He returned to Ole Miss, serving as acting chancellor from July 1942 to December 1943, and July 1–14, 1946, and continued teaching until his death on December 25, 1950, in Oxford, Mississippi, dedicating 58 years of service to the university. He was a member of Beta Theta Pi.

== Hume Hall ==
Named in honor of Alfred Hume, Hume Hall was dedicated in 1968 as a unit of the Science Center at the University of Mississippi, housing the Department of Mathematics. The department was originally located in the Lyceum, later moved to Peabody Hall, and in 1964 to a new biology building initially named for Hume. That building was renamed Shoemaker Hall in 1968, coinciding with the dedication of the current Hume Hall. A sign in front of the building reads "Hume Hall, 1967, Mathematics", perhaps indicating the start of construction, while university records confirm 1968 as the official dedication.

== Bibliography ==
Watson, Frances Egger (1987). Dr. Alfred Hume: His Leadership as Vice Chancellor, Acting Chancellor, and Chancellor of the University of Mississippi (1905–1945). Oxford, Mississippi: University of Mississippi Press.
