= Alfred Benjamin Butts =

American academic (1890–1962)

Alfred Benjamin Butts (1890 – 1962) was an American political scientist and university administrator. He served as the chancellor of the University of Mississippi from 1935 to 1946.

== Early life ==
Alfred Benjamin Butts was born in 1890 in Durham, North Carolina. In 1911, he received a B.S. degree from Mississippi A&M College, now known as Mississippi State University, and a Ph.D. from Columbia University in 1920. He received a law degree from Yale Law School in 1930.

== Career ==
From 1911 to 1935, he taught at Mississippi A&M. He served as chancellor of the University of Mississippi from 1935 to 1946. He served as the president of the Southern Political Science Association (SPSA) in 1938.

== Death ==
He died in 1962.

== Bibliography ==
- Public administration in Mississippi (1919)
