= Edward Mayes =

American educator

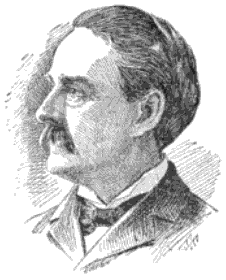
- Born: December 15, 1846; Hinds County, Mississippi, U.S.
- Died: August 9, 1917 (aged 70); Jackson, Mississippi, U.S.
- Education: Bethany College; University of Mississippi
- Occupation: Educator

Edward Mayes (December 15, 1846 – August 9, 1917) was an American lawyer and law professor who served as the Chancellor of the University of Mississippi from 1887 to 1891.

== Early life and education ==
He was born on December 15, 1846, in Hinds County, Mississippi, to Elizabeth Mayes and her Virginia-born attorney husband Daniel Mayes, who already had three older sons and an unmarried daughter living in their household, as well as American-born and Irish-born servants. They also owned 31 enslaved people. Mayes received a private education appropriate to his class, including at Bethany College in Virginia.

As Mississippi seceded from the Union during the American Civil War, despite his youth, Mayes volunteered to fight for the Confederacy, enlisting as a private in Company B of Hughes' Battalion of Mississippi cavalry. On December 1, 1862, he rose to the rank of corporal with the 4th Mississippi Cavalry Regiment, assigned to Company H. Following the conflict, Mayes enrolled in the University of Mississippi, and graduated in 1868.

== Career ==
He worked as a lawyer in Coffeeville and Oxford. In 1877, he taught law at University of Mississippi. He served as its Chancellor from 1887 to 1891. He then taught law at Millsaps College.

== Death and legacy ==
He died in Jackson, Mississippi, aged 71.

== Bibliography ==
- History of Education in Mississippi
- Lucius Q.C. Lamar: his life, times, and speeches. 1825-1893 (1896)
