= Augustus Baldwin Longstreet =

American academic administrator (1790–1870)

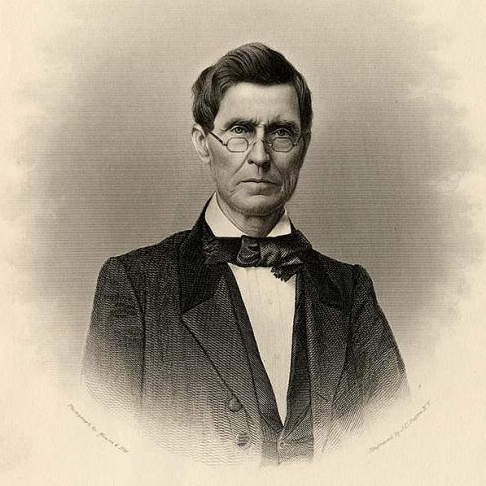
- Born: September 22, 1790; Augusta, Georgia
- Died: July 9, 1870 (aged 79); Oxford, Mississippi
- Education: Yale University (AB); Litchfield Law School
- Occupations: Lawyer, minister, journalist, educator, humorist
- Children: Virginia Longstreet
- Writing career
- Period: 1833 - 1864
- Genre: Southern humor
- Notable work: Georgia Scenes

Augustus Baldwin Longstreet (September 22, 1790 – July 9, 1870) was an American lawyer, minister, journalist, educator, and humorist, known for his book Georgia Scenes. He held strong pro-slavery and pro-secessionist views which he publicly advocated for in his various positions. He personally owned dozens of slaves throughout his life. He held the presidency of several southern universities, including the University of Mississippi (twice), South Carolina College (now the University of South Carolina), and Emory College (now Emory University).

Longstreet was the uncle of the senior Confederate General James Longstreet, whom he helped raise, and to whom he was a mentor.

== Life and career ==
=== Pre-Civil War ===
Longstreet was born on Sept. 22, 1790, in Augusta, Georgia, a son of the inventor William Longstreet. He graduated from Yale University in 1813, studied law in Litchfield, Connecticut, and was admitted to the bar in Richmond County, Georgia, in 1815. He soon moved and rose to eminence as a lawyer in Greensboro, Georgia. He represented Greene County in the state legislature in 1821, and in 1822 became a district judge in Ocmulgee. After several years as a judge, he declined re-election and resumed his legal practice in Augusta, Georgia, did editorial work, and established the Augusta Sentinel, which soon merged with The Augusta Chronicle (1838).

Longstreet had begun to write for the press at an early age, and his pen was never idle. His chief periodical contributions are to be found in The Methodist Quarterly, Southern Literary Messenger, The Southern Field and Fireside, The Magnolia, and The Orion, and include "Letters to Clergymen of the Northern Methodist Church" and "Letters from Georgia to Massachusetts."

Longstreet's literary fame is based on his authorship of Georgia Scenes, Characters, Incidents, &c. in the First Half Century of the Republic (1835), originally published in newspapers, then gathered into a volume in the South, and finally published in New York in 1840. It featured realistic sketches of Southern humor, and, according to historian Elizabeth R. Varon, "helped give rise to the literary genre of Southwestern humor and 'local color' stories featuring the customs and dialects of rural folk and thus creating an antecedent for Mark Twain." It is said that Longstreet sent out men in an attempt to collect and destroy all copies of the first edition and that he disavowed the second, published in 1867.

In 1838, Longstreet became a Methodist minister. During the period of his ministry, the town was struck by yellow fever, and he ministered to the sick and dying.

During his years as a minister, Longstreet preached a doctrine of secession and defended slavery. He was conspicuous in the turmoil that led to the breakup of the Methodist Church into Northern and Southern branches. In a pamphlet published in 1845, he told Northern abolitionist "What you believe to be sinful, we believe to be perfectly innocent." He portrayed abolitionists as a "tribe of self-infuriated madmen, rushing through the country with the Bible in one hand and a torch in the other – preaching peace, and scattering the flames of civil war," and said that they were creating a "system of warfare against Slavery."

In 1839, Longstreet was made president of Emory College. After nine years he accepted the presidency of Centenary College, Louisiana, then of the University of Mississippi, where he stayed for six years, after which he resigned, and became a planter. Four years later, in 1857, he became president of South Carolina College. Just before the Civil War, he returned to his old presidency in Mississippi.

As an educator, Longstreet urged Southerners to "elevate and purify the education of the South" by creating their own pro-slavery literary culture and rejecting "polluted" Northern literature and journals. He warned one graduating class in 1859 to expect to be "condemned for your patriotism, and tormented for your benefactions" by Northerners.

=== Civil War and after ===
In 1860, Longstreet was a delegate to the prestigious International Statistical Conference in London, but conspicuously withdrew himself because of the presence of a Black delegate, Martin Delany, a physician and an abolitionist, claiming that Delany's presence was an insult to the South. In December, Longstreet published a polemic on the incident, "An Appeal to the South", in which he wrote "I do not believe there exists on the face of the earth two nations who more cordially detest each other than the slaveholding and nonslaveholding states of this Republic", and urged the South to"declare war against [their] oppressors".

In politics Longstreet – a life-long Democrat – belonged to the Jeffersonian school of strict construction and states rights. He made speeches on all occasions through his life. Scholar Lewis M. Purifoy notes that

[I]n a baccalaureate address to the University of South Carolina graduating class of 1859, [Longstreet] urged the young men of his audience to defend Southern rights to the utmost. While they should not strive to break up the Union, they should not 'make a dishonorable surrender of the thousandth part of the mill more to save it.' He defended slavery mainly on the ground that freeing [slaves] would be ruinous to Southern society; and the burden of his speech was that the South had suffered long and grievously at the hand of the North. Longstreet assured the class that secession would not lead to war, but, if it should, a united South would win.

"I have heard him," writes a person who knew Longstreet, "respond to a serenade, preach a funeral sermon, deliver a college commencement address, and make a harangue over the pyrotechnic glorifications of seceding states. He could never be scared up without a speech."

Following the Civil War, Longstreet continued to be an unrepentant and unreconstructed advocate of white supremacy, and a fierce critic of Reconstruction and the administration of President Ulysses S. Grant, despite the fact that his nephew, former Confederate General James Lonstreet, supported both the Republican Party and Grant, an antebellum friend. In two essays published in 1869–1870, Augustus cited the "barbarism" of the Union's war-making and of Grant's generalship, and complained that Northerners were putting "[the] bright Caucasian under the stupid African", making "slaves freemen and freemen slaves."

Longstreet died on July 9, 1870, in Oxford, Mississippi, and is buried in section one of St. Peter's Cemetery.

Longstreet was a long-time friend and associate of John C. Calhoun, who was his classmate at Yale.

== Family ==
Longstreet was a mentor for his nephew James Longstreet, a future high-ranking Confederate general, who lived with him on his plantation, Westover, from 1830 to 1838 in order to attend a nearby school.

Augustus Longstreet married Frances Eliza Parke on Mar. 3, 1817. Their daughter Virginia married the future Supreme Court justice Lucius Quintus Cincinnatus Lamar in Oxford, Georgia, in 1847, while Augustus was president of Emory College. They were married in the "President's House" at Emory, which is today the Dean's residence for Oxford College of Emory University. The newlywed couple would later follow him to Mississippi when he became president of The University of Mississippi.

American actress Lara Parker is his third-great-granddaughter.

== Legacy ==
Longstreet Theater on the University of South Carolina campus is named in his honor; in July 2021, the university's Presidential Commission on University History recommended removing his name from the building.

Academic offices
Preceded by George Frederick Holmes	Chancellors of the University of Mississippi; 1849-1856	Succeeded by Frederick Augustus Porter Barnard
