= Andrew Armstrong Kincannon =

American academic (1859–1938)

Andrew Armstrong Kincannon (1859-1938) was the chancellor of the University of Mississippi from 1907 to 1914. He served as Mississippi's state superintendent of schools.

== Biography ==
He was born in Noxubee County, Mississippi in on 2 August 1859. In 1884, he graduated from the National Normal University of Ohio. He taught at Mississippi A&M College, now known as Mississippi State University, and was superintendent of the new public school system in Meridian, Mississippi. He was also president of the Industrial Institute and College, now known as Mississippi University for Women. From 1907 to 1914, he served as chancellor of the University of Mississippi. He died in New Orleans on 10 December 1938 and was buried in Columbus, Mississippi.
