= Porter Lee Fortune Jr. =

Chancellor of the University of Mississippi

Porter Lee Fortune Jr. (July 2, 1920 – September 14, 1989) was the Chancellor of the University of Mississippi from 1968 to 1984.

== Biography ==
He was born in 1920. He served as a US naval officer in the Second World War. He received a PhD from the University of North Carolina at Chapel Hill. He taught at Mississippi Southern College, now known as the University of Southern Mississippi, and later served as dean of the university and graduate school. He served as chancellor of the University of Mississippi from 1968 to 1984.
