= National Register of Historic Places listings in Oktibbeha County, Mississippi =

Location of Oktibbeha County in Mississippi

This is a list of the National Register of Historic Places listings in Oktibbeha County, Mississippi.

This is intended to be a complete list of the properties and districts on the National Register of Historic Places in Oktibbeha County, Mississippi, United States. Latitude and longitude coordinates are provided for many National Register properties and districts; these locations may be seen together in a map.

There are 25 properties and districts listed on the National Register in the county.

This National Park Service list is complete through NPS recent listings posted December 12, 2025.

== Current listings ==
	Name on the Register	Image	Date listed	Location	City or town	Description
1	Bardwell House		July 16, 1992 (#92000890)	309 Blackjack Road; 33°26′53″N 88°46′56″W	Starkville	Demolished
2	Bell House		October 29, 1992 (#92001480)	1280 Mississippi Highway 25, S. 33°26′11″N 88°49′06″W	Starkville	
3	Thomas Battle Carroll House	Thomas Battle Carroll House	May 1, 1991 (#91000531)	304 S. Jackson St. 33°27′36″N 88°48′51″W	Starkville	
4	The Cedars	The Cedars	October 10, 1985 (#85003003)	607 Old West Point Rd. 33°28′31″N 88°48′04″W	Starkville	
5	Downtown Starkville Historic District		July 25, 2012 (#12000433)	Roughly bounded by Jefferson, N. Montgomery, & Yeates Sts., & railroad 33°27′48″N 88°48′52″W	Starkville	
6	C. E. Gay House	C. E. Gay House	January 3, 1991 (#90002108)	110 E. Gillespie St. 33°27′28″N 88°48′55″W	Starkville	
7	Gillespie-Jackson House		November 6, 1986 (#86003127)	701 Louisville; 33°27′13″N 88°49′17″W	Starkville	Demolished
8	Greensboro Street Historic District		June 14, 1982 (#82003112)	Greensboro St.; also Ernest Jones Jr. Dr., Greensboro St., Louisville St., Main St., W., Raymond St., and Yeates St. 33°27′42″N 88°49′29″W	Starkville	Second set of boundaries represents a boundary increase of July 10, 2008
9	Herman Mound and Village Site		March 17, 1993 (#93000137)	Address restricted	Starkville	
10	Hotel Chester	Hotel Chester	January 18, 1985 (#85000099)	217-223 E. Main St. 33°27′50″N 88°48′51″W	Starkville	
11	Lampkin-Owens House	Lampkin-Owens House	November 24, 1980 (#80002298)	117 N. Montgomery St. 33°27′56″N 88°48′38″W	Starkville	
12	Lyon's Bluff Site		April 22, 1976 (#76001105)	Address restricted	Starkville	
13	Magruder-Newsom House		August 30, 1984 (#84002284)	306 S. Jackson St. 33°27′36″N 88°48′51″W	Starkville	
14	Meadow Woods Plantation House		September 7, 2001 (#01000946)	2479 Oktoc Rd. 33°22′04″N 88°45′43″W	Starkville	
15	Montgomery Hall	Montgomery Hall	March 26, 1975 (#75001054)	Mississippi State University campus 33°27′13″N 88°47′29″W	Starkville	Constructed 1902-03 using Beaux-Arts architectural style
16	Nash Street Historic District		June 24, 1993 (#93000572)	525 University Dr. and 101-117 N. Nash St. 33°27′47″N 88°48′14″W	Starkville	
17	Odd Fellows Cemetery	Odd Fellows Cemetery	July 24, 1990 (#90001064)	Junction of U.S. Route 82 and Henderson St. 33°28′00″N 88°49′15″W	Starkville	
18	Oktibbeha Gardens Subdivision Historic District		September 28, 2017 (#100001682)	Roughly bounded by Critz & N. Montgomery Sts., Old West Point Rd. & Dr. Martin Luther King Jr. Dr. E. 33°28′08″N 88°48′29″W	Starkville	
19	Dossey A. Outlaw Plantation	Dossey A. Outlaw Plantation	April 11, 2002 (#02000354)	6114 Oktoc Rd. 33°23′07″N 88°46′27″W	Starkville	
20	Overstreet School Historic District		October 23, 1992 (#92001398)	Roughly bounded by Hogan, Montgomery, Gillespie, Jackson, Wood, and Washington Sts. and the Illinois Central railroad tracks 33°27′34″N 88°48′48″W	Starkville	
21	Emma and Ed Rogers House	Emma and Ed Rogers House	September 28, 2017 (#100001684)	1245 Longview Rd. 33°24′16″N 88°51′29″W	Starkville	
22	Starkville Colored Cemetery	Starkville Colored Cemetery	June 2, 2014 (#14000277)	N. side of University Dr., W. of N. Nash & E. of Hartness Sts. 33°27′46″N 88°48′25″W	Starkville	Brush Arbor Cemetery
23	John M. Stone Cotton Mill	John M. Stone Cotton Mill	April 29, 1975 (#75001055)	600 Russell St. 33°27′26″N 88°48′09″W	Starkville	
24	Textile Building	Textile Building	May 12, 1975 (#75001056)	South of Starkville on the Mississippi State University campus 33°27′08″N 88°47′30″W	Starkville	Constructed in 1900 using Italianate, Mission & Romanesque architectural styles. Oldest academic building on the Mississippi State University campus.
25	Walker-Critz House	Walker-Critz House	March 22, 1989 (#89000171)	414 Chapin St. 33°28′01″N 88°48′29″W	Starkville	

== See also ==
- List of National Historic Landmarks in Mississippi
- National Register of Historic Places listings in Mississippi
