= 1895 Mississippi gubernatorial election =

- November 5, 1895
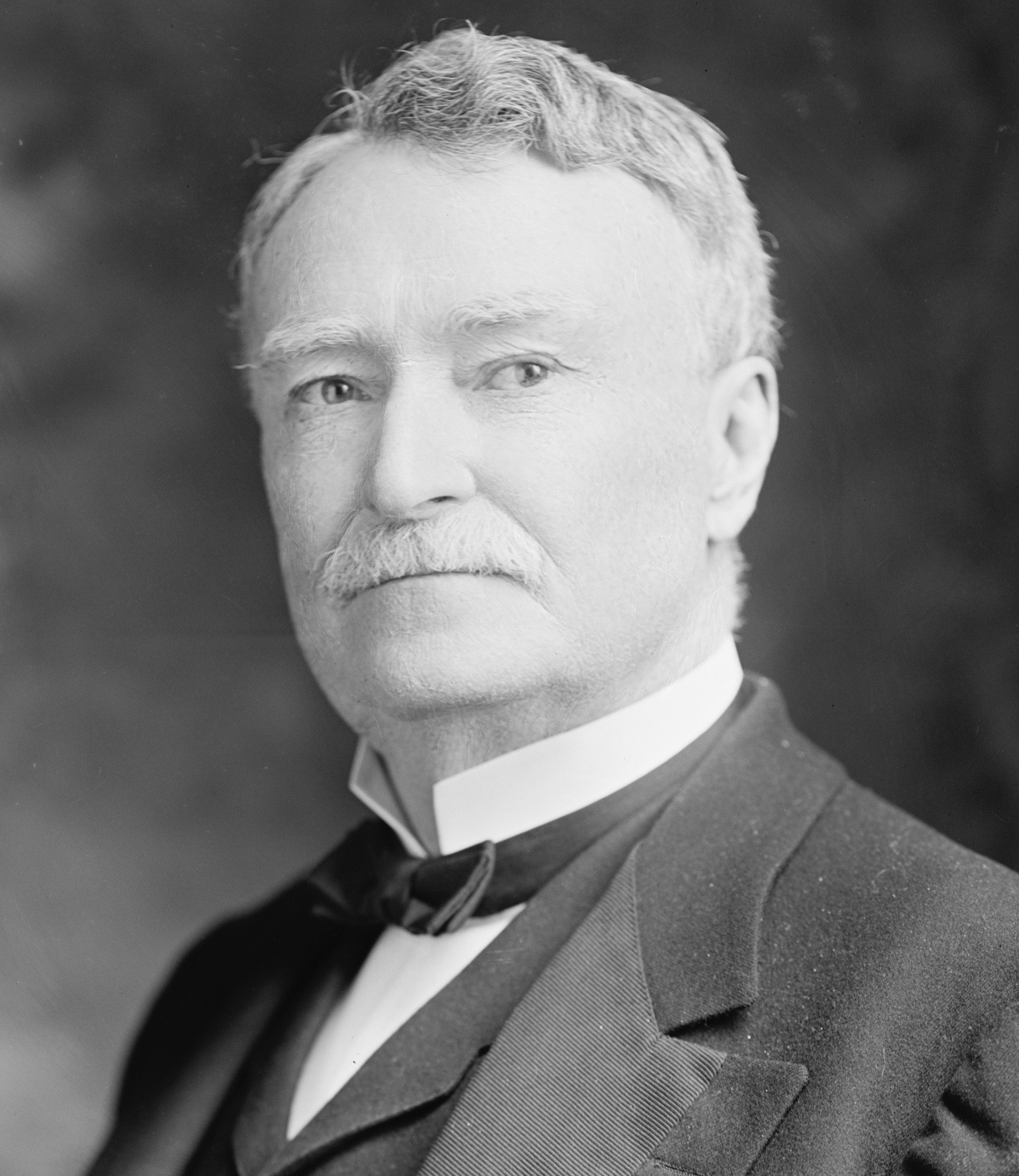

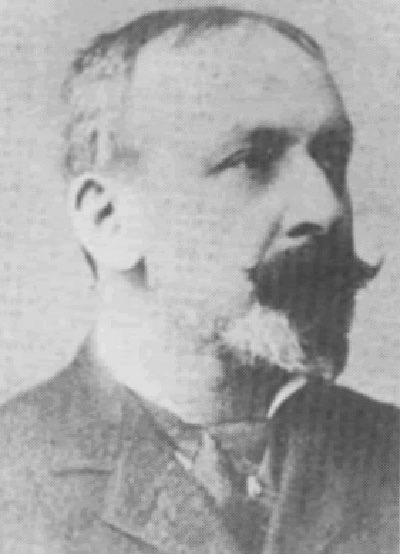
Nominee	Anselm J. McLaurin	Frank Burkitt
Party	Democratic	Populist
Popular vote	46,870	18,167
Percentage	72.07%	27.93%
- County results McLaurin: 50–60% 60–70% 70–80% 80–90% >90% Burkitt: 50–60%
Governor before election
John Marshall Stone
Democratic
Elected Governor
Anselm J. McLaurin
Democratic

The 1895 Mississippi gubernatorial election took place on November 5, 1895, in order to elect the Governor of Mississippi. Incumbent Democrat John Marshall Stone was term-limited, and could not run for reelection to a second consecutive term.

== Background ==
A new state constitution was adopted in 1890, which extended Stone's term to six years. Determined to keep control and maintain white supremacy, the Democratic-dominated legislature effectively disfranchised most African Americans in the state by adding a requirement to the constitution for voter registration for payment of poll taxes. Two years later, they passed laws requiring literacy tests that were administered by white officials in a discriminatory way. These requirements, with additions in legislation of 1892, resulted in a 90% reduction in the number of blacks who voted in Mississippi. In most counties a handful of prominent black ministers and local leaders were allowed to vote. African Americans were essentially excluded from the political system for 70 years, until after passage of federal civil rights legislation in the mid-1960s.

== General election ==
In the general election, Democratic candidate Anselm J. McLaurin, a former U.S. Senator, defeated Populist nominee Frank Burkitt, a newspaper editor and state representative.

=== Results ===
Mississippi gubernatorial election, 1895
Party	Candidate	Votes	%
Democratic	Anselm J. McLaurin	46,870	72.07
Populist	Frank Burkitt	18,167	27.93
Total votes		65,037	100.00
Democratic hold			
