= Lochinvar (Pontotoc, Mississippi) =

Historic house in Mississippi, United States

- U.S. National Register of Historic Places
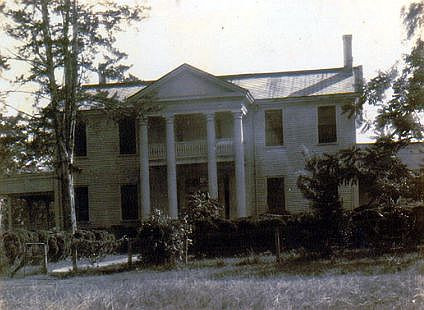
- Lochinvar (c. 1940)

- Location within Mississippi Location within the United States
- Interactive map showing the location of Lochnivar
- Nearest city: Pontotoc, Mississippi
- Coordinates: 34°12′56″N 89°0′22″W
- Area: 0.8 acres (0.32 ha)
- Built: 1836
- Architectural style: Greek Revival
- NRHP reference No.: 86000331
- Added to NRHP: March 13, 1986

Lochinvar is an antebellum plantation house near Pontotoc, Mississippi built by Robert Gordon c. 1836. It is listed on the National Register of Historic Places.

== Architecture ==
The house's heart pine woodwork and handmade bricks highlight the attention to detail of its wealthy owner and the Scottish architects and builders he employed. Solid Doric style columns from a castle in Scotland support the front porches, and the balcony railing is carved to resemble English lace. An entirely self-supporting spiral staircase winds to the second floor, and a secret stairway is set between the walls in the back of the house.

== History ==
Gordon bought this land from a Chickasaw woman, Molly Gunn, daughter of William Colbert and his wife. She was married to James Gunn. Robert Gordon had immigrated to Cotton Gin Port, Mississippi, from Scotland. The Gordons of Lochinvar were an old Scottish clan whose seat was at Kenmure Castle in Galloway, Scotland. He excelled as a trader in the Native American communities and a landowner, and founded the town of Aberdeen in Monroe County, Mississippi. After the Chickasaw Cession of 1832, he purchased two sections of land near Pontotoc, where he built Lochinvar in 1836.

He married Mary Elizabeth Walton. Their son, James Gordon, grew up in the house. He married Carolina Virginia Wiley, and they had two children, Annie and Robert James. A planter, James Gordon served as an officer in the Confederate Army under Jeb Stuart and Nathan Bedford Forrest. He was briefly suspected of conspiring with John Wilkes Booth in the assassination of President Abraham Lincoln.

James Gordon became a politician, representing Chickasaw County in the Mississippi legislature in 1857, 1878, 1886, and 1904–1908. In December 1909 Governor Edmond F. Noel appointed him to fill the unexpired term of U.S. Senator Anselm J. McLaurin until the state legislature could elect a new senator in February 1910. (This was prior to popular election of US Senators.)

James Gordon had inherited Lochinvar when his father died in 1867. Lochinvar remained in the Gordon family until 1900, when J. D. Fontaine, an attorney in Pontotoc, Mississippi, bought it to use as a tenant house. The black-and-white photo on this page was taken during a stage of poor maintenance.

In 1966 Dr. Forrest Tutor and his wife, Dr. Janis Burns Tutor, purchased the house from Fontaine's son and restored it. The house is listed on the National Register of Historic Places. Heavily damaged by a tornado in 2001, Lochinvar has been restored by the Tutors to its former glory. A photo album of the house is maintained by the Mississippi Department of Archives and History at the link in "External links" below.
