= 1889 Mississippi gubernatorial election =

- November 1, 1889
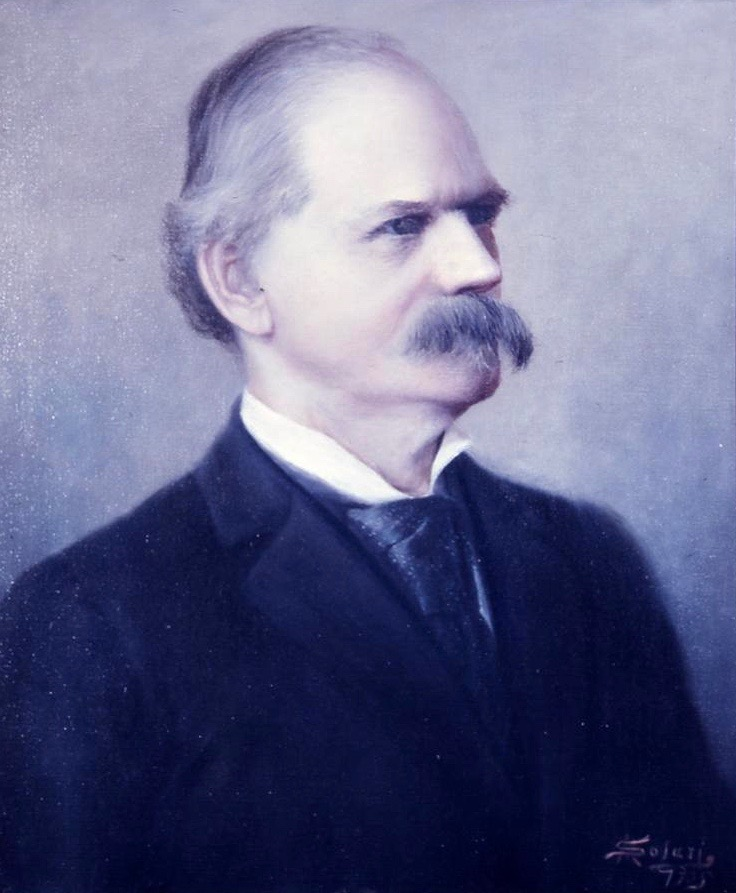
Nominee	John M. Stone
Party	Democratic
Popular vote	84,929
Percentage	99.98%
- County results Stone: >90%
Governor before election
Robert Lowry
Democratic
Elected Governor
John Marshall Stone
Democratic

The 1889 Mississippi gubernatorial election took place on November 1, 1889, in order to elect the Governor of Mississippi. This election was the last held under the Constitution of 1868. The 1890 constitution, adopted a year after the election, effectively disenfranchised African-Americans.

== General election ==
In the general election, Democratic candidate John Marshall Stone, who previously served as governor from 1876 until 1882, ran unopposed.

=== Results ===
Mississippi gubernatorial election, 1889
Party	Candidate	Votes	%
Democratic	John M. Stone	84,929	99.98
Other		16	0.02
Total votes		84,945	100.00
Democratic hold			
