= Governor Lowry =

Governor Lowry may refer to:

- Mike Lowry (1939–2017), 20th Governor of Washington
- Robert Lowry (governor) (1829–1910), 32nd Governor of Mississippi
