= William H. Sims (American politician) =

American politician (1837–1920)

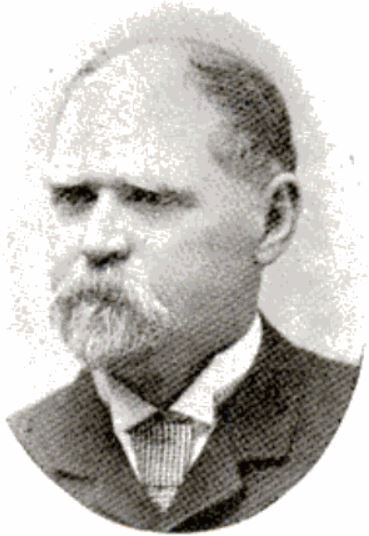

10th Lieutenant Governor of Mississippi
- In office January 1878 – January 3, 1882
- Governor: John M. Stone
- Preceded by: John M. Stone
- Succeeded by: G. D. Shands

18th President pro tempore of the Mississippi State Senate
- In office January 1876 – January 1878
- Preceded by: John M. Stone
- Succeeded by: Reuben O. Reynolds

Member of the Mississippi State Senate from the 18th district
- In office January 1876 – January 1878

Personal details
- Born: July 31, 1837 Lexington, Georgia
- Died: February 28, 1920 (aged 82) Birmingham, Alabama
- Party: Democrat
- Children: 1

William Henry Sims (July 31, 1837 - February 28, 1920) was a lawyer, Confederate officer, and Democratic politician from Mississippi. He was the state's lieutenant governor from 1878 to 1882.

== Early life ==
William Henry Sims was born on July 31, 1837, in Lexington, Georgia. He was the son of James Saunders Sims and Anna Booker (Moore) Sims, both of whom had Virginian descent. William was the eldest of three children. He graduated from the University of Georgia in 1856. He studied law and was admitted to the bar in his new residence of Columbus, Mississippi, in 1859. He then spent a year in Harvard Law School to further his law study. Sims fought for the Confederacy in the Civil War, and reached the rank of lieutenant colonel. He lost the lower part of one of his legs at the Battle of Franklin. After the war, he returned to Columbus to continue practicing law.

== Political career ==
In 1866, he was elected probate judge of Lowndes County, a position he held until 1869. In 1875, he was elected to the Mississippi Senate to represent the state's 18th district, consisting of Lowndes, Oktibbeha, and Clay counties from 1876 to 1878. After the departures of Republican state governor Adelbert Ames and lieutenant governor Alexander Davis in 1876, John M. Stone (the President Pro Tempore of the Senate) became the Governor of Mississippi, and Sims was voted president pro tempore, becoming the state's acting lieutenant governor. Sims was then elected lieutenant governor in the election in 1878. Sims did not seek re-election in 1882, and went back to practicing law. In 1888, he was chosen as a state delegate to the Democratic National Convention. He was also a delegate to the convention in 1892. From 1893 to 1897, he was the assistant Secretary of the Interior.

== Later life ==
In 1898, he moved to Birmingham, Alabama, and in 1899, he set up a law office there with his son. He died at his home in Birmingham on February 28, 1920.

== Personal life ==
Sims married Louisa Upson on August 11, 1870. They had one child, Henry Upson Sims, who was born in Columbus on June 27, 1873. Louisa died in 1913.
