= Belle Edmondson =

Confederate smuggler

- Born: November 27, 1840; Pontotoc, Mississippi, USA
- Died: July 15, 1873 (aged 32)
- Burial place: Elmwood Cemetery
- Years active: 1862-1864
- Known for: Confederate spy and smuggler during the American Civil War

Isabelle Buchanan Edmondson, known as Belle Edmondson (November 27, 1840 – July 15, 1873), was a spy and smuggler for the Confederate States of America during the American Civil War. Her writings have been published under the title A Lost Heroine of the Confederacy: The Diaries and Letters of Belle Edmondson.

== Early life and activities during the Civil War ==
Edmondson was born in Pontotoc, Mississippi on November 27, 1840. She was the eighth child in a wealthy family which enslaved eighteen people. She was educated at Franklin Female College. In 1860, the year before the Civil War began, her family moved to a farm eight miles southeast of Memphis, Tennessee. During the war, this farm was in no-man's-land about thirty miles from the Confederate lines. Two of Edmondson's brothers joined the Confederate Army, and she got engaged to a Confederate Army doctor.

Edmondson was a staunch supporter of the Confederacy, writing, "I worship Jeff Davis and every Rebel in Dixie," and, "May God forgive me if there be a sin in hating the Yankees." She believed her family's slaves were loyal, and used them to smuggle clothes across Union lines. In 1862, she nursed Confederates who had been wounded at Shiloh. After the Union Army occupied Memphis, Edmondson was banned from the city for waving a Confederate flag.

She signed up as a scout for the Confederates and, throughout 1863 and into 1864, smuggled documents, medicine, clothing and other supplies for them. She sometimes hid contraband items under her hoopskirts or in her bosom. She took advantage of the fact that Union Army officers preferred not to search women. She kept a diary from 1863 to 1864, recording information about the military situation and her smuggling as well as details of her day-to-day life and the hardships of wartime.

Late in 1863, Edmondson's Confederate doctor fiancé broke off their engagement for unclear reasons; she was devastated. Union General Stephen Hurlburt issued a warrant for her arrest on April 20, 1864; Edmondson wrote that it was for "carrying letters through the lines and smuggling, and aiding the Rebellion in every way in my power". Because he knew her father was a Freemason, the Union officer tasked with executing the warrant, instead of arresting her, warned her to go into hiding. Later that year, Edmondson moved to Waverly Plantation in Clay County, Mississippi and stayed there until at least 1865.

== Postwar life and legacy ==
After the Civil War, Edmondson remained in Mississippi, but details of her postwar life are sketchy. She died on July 15, 1873, shortly after announcing her engagement to a "Colonel H". No death certificate was issued and her death was not recorded in the local newspapers. She is buried in Elmwood Cemetery with her parents.

A collection of Edmondson's writings is held at the University of Mississippi. In 1990, her writings were published by the University Press of Mississippi under the title A Lost Heroine of the Confederacy: The Diaries of Letters of Belle Edmondson, edited by William and Loretta Galbraith.

== See also ==
- Mary Boykin Chesnut
- Emeline Piggott
- Laura Ratcliffe
- Elizabeth Van Lew
