= Frank Burkitt =

American newspaper editor and politician

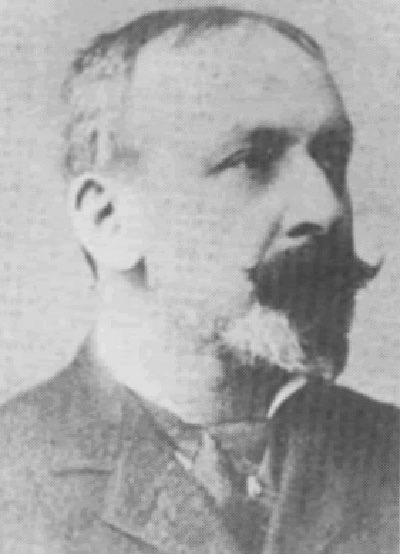

Member of the Mississippi State Senate from the 31st district
- In office January 1912 – November 18, 1914 Serving with W. J. Evans
- Preceded by: J. J. Adams; Charles E. Franklin
- Succeeded by: Marshal T. Adams; N. W. Bradford

Member of the Mississippi House of Representatives
- In office January 1908 – January 1912
- In office January 1892 – January 1896
- In office January 1886 – January 1890

Personal details
- Born: Benjamin Franklin Burkett; July 5, 1843 Lawrenceburg, Tennessee, United States
- Died: November 18, 1914 (aged 71) Okolona, Mississippi, United States
- Party: Democratic (before 1891; 1900–1914); Populist (1891–1900)
- Spouse(s): Mattie Schimsher (m. 1866–?); Mary Elizabeth Mitchell (m. 1906–1914)
- Children: 4

Benjamin Franklin Burkitt (July 5, 1843 – November 18, 1914) was an American newspaper editor, land developer, and politician from the state of Mississippi.

== Biography ==
Burkitt was born in Lawrenceburg, Tennessee, in 1843 to Henry Lemuel Burkett and Louise Howell. Henry Burkett's ancestors had moved to North Carolina before the American Revolution, where Henry grew up before moving to Tennessee. Burkitt served in the 9th Battalion Tennessee Cavalry of the Confederate States Army during the American Civil War. After the war had ended, he taught in Alabama for two years, and moved to Houston, Mississippi, in 1867, becoming the editor of the Houston Messenger in 1872. He moved the paper to Okolona, Mississippi, in 1876 and renamed it the Peoples' Messenger, becoming active with the Mississippi State Grange. Burkitt was elected president of the Mississippi Press Association in 1883. Burkitt also began to practice law in 1872.

=== Calhoun City ===
On July 25, 1905, the state of Mississippi granted Burkitt a charter for a new town he developed in Calhoun County, Mississippi, where a rail line was being built by the Southern Railway from his residence in Okolona. Burkitt named the town after himself, but it was renamed to Calhoun City only a year later, after John C. Calhoun.

=== Political career ===
Burkitt began his political career when he was elected to the Mississippi House of Representatives as a Democrat in 1885, serving four terms. He was a delegate to the 1890 constitutional convention. In 1891, he joined the newly-formed Populist Party, and ran as that party's candidate for Mississippi's 4th congressional district in 1892, losing to Democrat Hernando Money and receiving 39% of the vote. Burkitt was appointed as a Democratic elector for the 1892 presidential election, but resigned in order to support the Populist ticket. He ran for Governor of Mississippi in the 1895 gubernatorial election, losing to Democrat Anselm J. McLaurin and receiving 28% of the vote. He rejoined the Democratic Party in 1900, and was elected again to the House in 1907. Burkitt was elected to the Mississippi State Senate in 1910, and served until his death on November 18, 1914, in Okolona.

== Personal life ==
Burkitt married Mattie Schrimsher on December 30, 1866, and they had four children: Jennie Lee Cary, James Howell, Mary Louise King, and Bennie Dossett. He again married on December 30, 1906, this time to Mary Elizabeth Mitchell.

Party political offices
| First | Populist nominee for Governor of Mississippi; 1895 | Succeeded by R. K. Prewitt |
