= Pontotoc, Mississippi =

- City
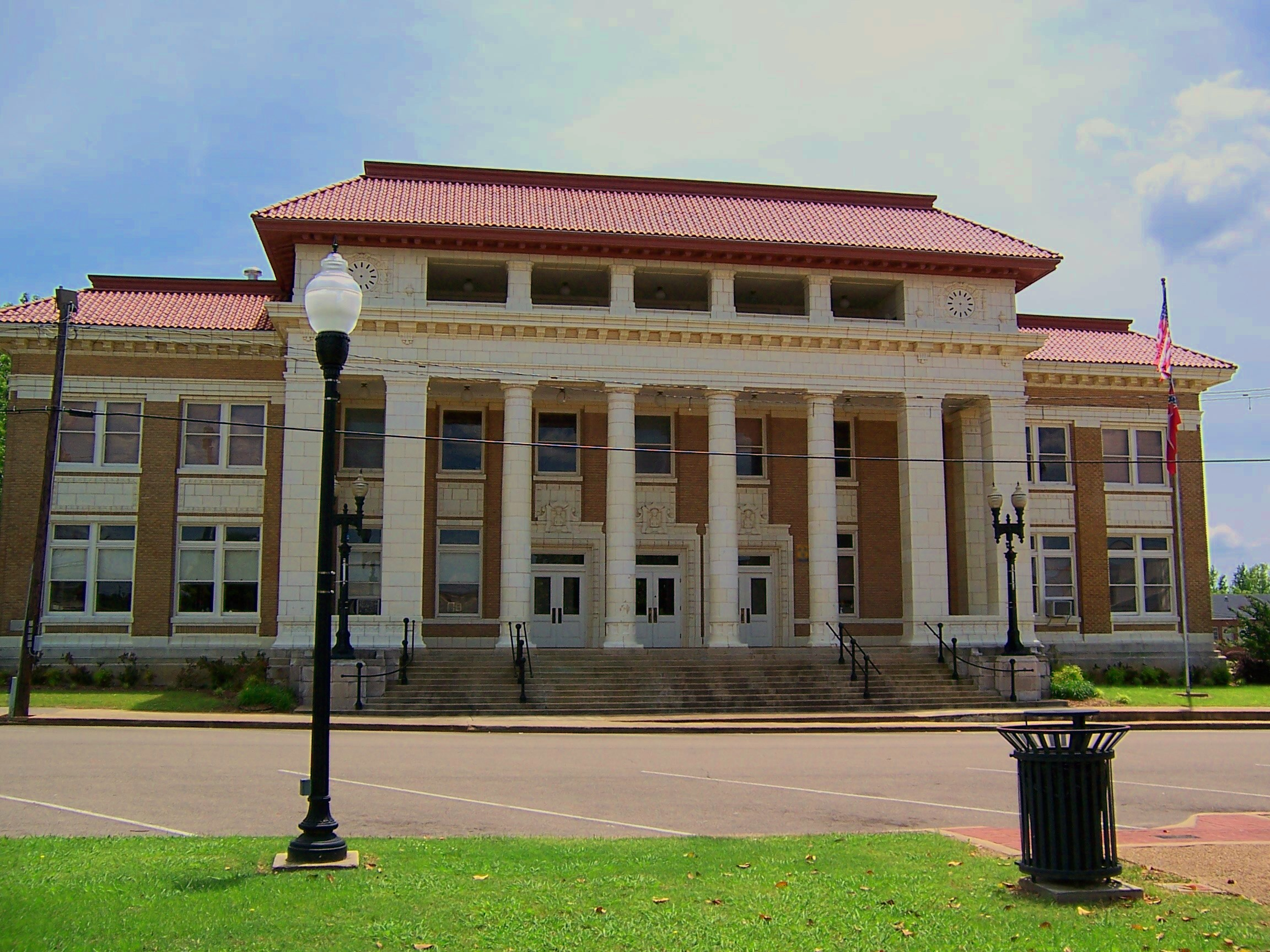
- Pontotoc County Courthouse in Pontotoc

- Flag

- Location of Pontotoc, Mississippi

- Location within Mississippi Location within the United States
- Coordinates: 34°14′55″N 89°00′24″W
- Country: United States
- State: Mississippi
- County: Pontotoc

Government
  - Mayor: Bob Peeples (D)

Area
  - Total: 11.34 sq mi (29.36 km^{2})
  - Land: 11.18 sq mi (28.96 km^{2})
  - Water: 0.15 sq mi (0.40 km^{2})
- Elevation: 459 ft (140 m)

Population (2020)
  - Total: 5,640
  - Density: 504.5/sq mi (194.78/km^{2})
- Time zone: UTC-6 (Central (CST))
  - Summer (DST): UTC-5 (CDT)
- ZIP code: 38863
- Area code: 662
- FIPS code: 28-59160
- GNIS feature ID: 2404549
- Website: www.pontotocms.org

Pontotoc is a city in and the county seat of Pontotoc County, Mississippi, located to the west of the larger city of Tupelo. Its population was 5,640 at the 2020 census. Pontotoc is a Chickasaw word that means, "Land of the Hanging Grapes". A section of the city largely along Main Street and Liberty Street has been designated the Pontotoc Historic District and is listed on the National Register of Historic Places. The Treaty of Pontotoc Site is also listed on the National Register. The Treaty of Pontotoc Creek, part of U.S. president Andrew Jackson's Indian Removal policy, ceded millions of acres of Native American lands and relocated the Chicakasaw west of the Mississippi River.

== History ==
The Chickasaw nation occupied this area long before Europeans colonized the Southeast, the last in a succession of indigenous peoples who had this territory for thousands of years. In the early 1830s, they were forced to Indian Territory west of the Mississippi River through the federal program of Indian removal. Pontotoc is a Chickasaw word meaning "Land of Hanging Grapes".

In the late 19th century, outlaws Jesse and Frank James and their gang came into this area. They once hid at an old house that had been used as a Union Army hospital during the Battle of Harrisburg or Battle of Tupelo in the Civil War. The house was located at a crossroad in east Pontotoc County, near the Lee County line.

The Town Square Museum is located in the historic US post office near the county courthouse. This space is used to house and display Pontotoc memorabilia. A full-service post office continues to operate in the building, which was built in 1937 during the Great Depression. It was one of numerous projects of the Works Progress Administration (WPA) under President Franklin D. Roosevelt. Investment in this program created work opportunities in construction of needed public buildings and infrastructure across the country, employing thousands of workers.

A mural in the post office lobby, titled The Wedding of Ortez and SaOwana - Christmas 1540 (1939), was commissioned as public art. It depicts a legendary feast given by Hernando de Soto to celebrate what was said to be the first recorded Christian marriage on the North American continent. The account appears to be local myth.

The groom was said to be Juan Ortez (his name was spelled Ortiz in Spanish), an interpreter for the expedition. He was a Spanish national who had been captured in Florida years before and held by Chief Uceta. He was finally released as a slave and lived for years with the Mocoso people. His bride was said to be Princess SaOwana, daughter of Chief Uceta. But Uceta's daughter was documented as Uleleh and she married a cacique, another Chickasaw chief. The wedding is said to have taken place in Pontotoc County during a visit by de Soto's party, but little documentation of such an event has been found.

The mural was painted in 1939 by artist Joseph Pollet, who had immigrated to the US as a child with his family from Germany. He was commissioned under the arts program that was also part of the federal WPA program. Many artists and writers were employed by such projects, in addition to the workers who built federal buildings. Many murals and other art were created for post offices and other public buildings.

The city holds an annual festival in the Town Square during the last week of September, called the Bodock Festival. It celebrates the Osage orange (Maclura pomifera) (also known as bois d'arc, or bowdock) tree located next to the historic mansion, Lochinvar; both survived a massive tornado in 2001.

== Geography ==
According to the United States Census Bureau, the city has a total area of 9.6 sq mi (25 km^{2}), of which 0.2 sq mi (0.52 km^{2}) (1.66%) is covered by water.

=== Climate ===
Climate data for Pontotoc Experiment Station, Mississippi (1991–2020 normals, extremes 1953–present)
Month	Jan	Feb	Mar	Apr	May	Jun	Jul	Aug	Sep	Oct	Nov	Dec	Year
Record high °F (°C)	79 (26)	84 (29)	88 (31)	93 (34)	96 (36)	102 (39)	105 (41)	104 (40)	102 (39)	96 (36)	87 (31)	79 (26)	105 (41)
Mean daily maximum °F (°C)	51.4 (10.8)	55.6 (13.1)	64.4 (18.0)	72.6 (22.6)	80.1 (26.7)	86.7 (30.4)	89.5 (31.9)	89.5 (31.9)	84.6 (29.2)	74.4 (23.6)	62.6 (17.0)	54.2 (12.3)	72.1 (22.3)
Daily mean °F (°C)	41.4 (5.2)	45.3 (7.4)	53.2 (11.8)	61.4 (16.3)	69.8 (21.0)	76.9 (24.9)	79.8 (26.6)	79.2 (26.2)	73.6 (23.1)	62.5 (16.9)	51.9 (11.1)	44.3 (6.8)	61.6 (16.4)
Mean daily minimum °F (°C)	31.4 (−0.3)	34.9 (1.6)	41.9 (5.5)	50.1 (10.1)	59.5 (15.3)	67.1 (19.5)	70.1 (21.2)	68.9 (20.5)	62.6 (17.0)	50.7 (10.4)	41.2 (5.1)	34.4 (1.3)	51.1 (10.6)
Record low °F (°C)	−6 (−21)	2 (−17)	12 (−11)	24 (−4)	35 (2)	44 (7)	51 (11)	48 (9)	35 (2)	26 (−3)	12 (−11)	−7 (−22)	−7 (−22)
Average precipitation inches (mm)	4.88 (124)	5.56 (141)	5.49 (139)	6.09 (155)	5.54 (141)	4.86 (123)	4.89 (124)	5.02 (128)	3.67 (93)	4.20 (107)	4.34 (110)	6.29 (160)	60.83 (1,545)
Average snowfall inches (cm)	0.0 (0.0)	0.1 (0.25)	0.1 (0.25)	0.0 (0.0)	0.0 (0.0)	0.0 (0.0)	0.0 (0.0)	0.0 (0.0)	0.0 (0.0)	0.0 (0.0)	0.0 (0.0)	0.1 (0.25)	0.3 (0.76)
Average precipitation days (≥ 0.01 in)	11.0	9.6	11.0	9.1	10.4	9.3	9.6	8.7	6.2	7.2	8.8	10.8	111.7
Average snowy days (≥ 0.1 in)	0.1	0.1	0.0	0.0	0.0	0.0	0.0	0.0	0.0	0.0	0.0	0.0	0.2
Source: NOAA

== Demographics ==
Historical population
Census	Pop.	Note	%±
1870	384		—
1880	447		16.4%
1890	535		19.7%
1900	1,010		88.8%
1910	1,277		26.4%
1920	1,274		−0.2%
1930	2,018		58.4%
1940	1,832		−9.2%
1950	1,596		−12.9%
1960	2,108		32.1%
1970	3,453		63.8%
1980	4,723		36.8%
1990	4,570		−3.2%
2000	5,253		14.9%
2010	5,625		7.1%
2020	5,640		0.3%
U.S. Decennial Census

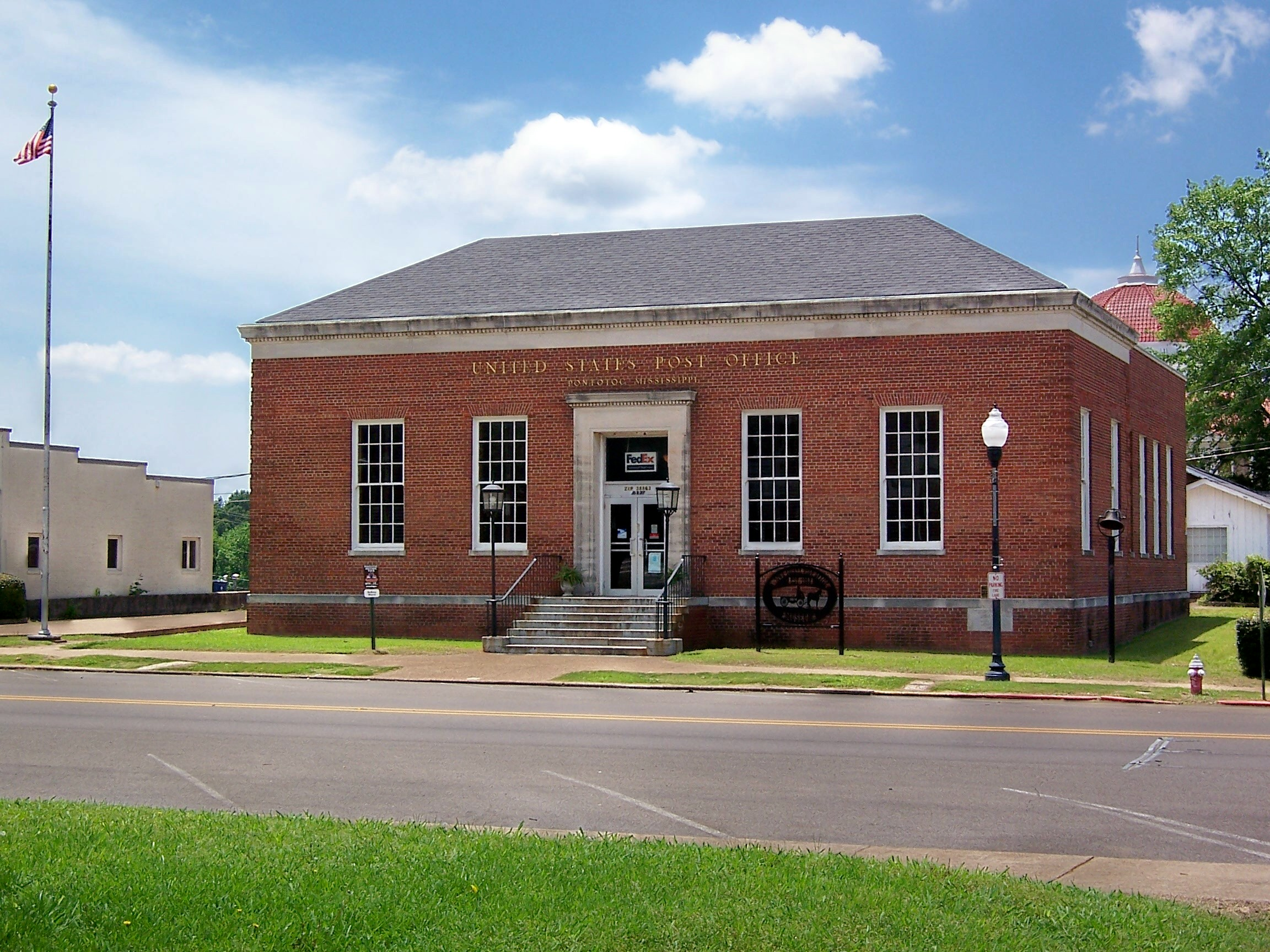
The Town Square Museum/Post Office located in downtown Pontotoc. The Post Office was built by the government in 1937, during the Depression.

=== 2020 census ===
As of the 2020 census, Pontotoc had a population of 5,640. The median age was 39.0 years; 24.3% of residents were under 18 and 19.4% were 65 or older. For every 100 females, there were 85.2 males, and for every 100 females 18 and over, there were 82.2 males 18 and over.

None of the residents lived in urban areas, while 100.0% lived in rural areas.

Of the 2,221 households in Pontotoc, including 1,342 family household, 31.5% had children under 18 living in them, 41.7% were married-couple households, 16.4% were households with a male householder and no spouse or partner present, and 37.6% were households with a female householder and no spouse or partner present. About 33.0% of all households were made up of individuals, and 16.7% had someone living alone who was 65 or older.

The city had 2,501 housing units, of which 11.2% were vacant. The homeowner vacancy rate was 0.5% and the rental vacancy rate was 16.1%.

Racial composition as of the 2020 census
Race	Number	Percent
White	3,618	64.1%
Black or African American	1,189	21.1%
American Indian and Alaska Native	67	1.2%
Asian	18	0.3%
Some other race	442	7.8%
Two or more races	306	5.4%
Hispanics or Latinos (of any race)	685	12.1%

=== 2010 census ===
As of the 2010 census, 5,625 people, 2,325 households, and 2,129 families resided in the city. The population density was 555.9 inhabitants per square mile (214.6/km^{2}). The 2,250 housing units averaged 238.1/sq mi (91.9/km^{2}). The racial makeup of the city was 70.08% White, 20.42% African American, 0.35% Native American, 0.24% Asian, 0.03% Pacific Islander, 7.39% from other races, and 1.45% from two or more races. Hispanics of any race were 2.76% of the population.

Of the 2,325 households, 32.2% had children under 18 living with them, 49.1% were married couples living together, 16.0% had a female householder with no husband present, and 31.9% were not families. About 29.2% of all households were made up of individuals, and 15.5% had someone living alone who was 65 or older. The average household size was 2.41, and the average family size was 2.97.

In the city, the age distribution was 25.7% under 18, 8.6% from 18 to 24, 26.3% from 25 to 44, 21.5% from 45 to 64, and 18.0% who were 65 or older. The median age was 37 years. For every 100 females, there were 84.8 males. For every 100 females 18 and over, there were 77.6 males.

The median income in the city for a household was $28,491 and for a family was $39,306. Males had a median income of $31,403 versus $23,491 for females. The per capita income for the city was $17,324. About 12.0% of families and 17.6% of the population were below the poverty line, including 18.5% of those under 18 and 23.0% of those 65 or over.

== Education ==
Almost all of the city of Pontotoc is served by the Pontotoc City School District, while a small portion of the city limits is in the Pontotoc County School District.

Pontotoc High School and South Pontotoc High School are in Pontotoc. The Pontotoc County School District, serving surrounding areas, has its headquarters in Pontotoc. They are two of the top academic schools in Mississippi. North received the Blue Ribbon Award and South received Level 5, the highest rating for a school in Mississippi. The city's band was the grand champion in the state in 2017.

== Notable people ==
- Marshal T. Adams, member of the Mississippi State Senate from 1916 to 1924
- Terry "Harmonica" Bean, bluesman, lifelong resident of Pontotoc
- N. W. Bradford, former member of the Mississippi House of Representatives and Mississippi Senate
- Delaney Bramlett, singer, songwriter, and musician, born in Pontotoc
- Nickey Browning, member of the Mississippi State Senate from 1996 to 2020
- Thad Cochran, former U.S. Senator from Mississippi
- Alfred Oscar Coffin (born 1861), first African-American man to earn a Ph.D. in biological sciences, professor of Romance languages at Langston University
- DeVan Dallas, member of the Mississippi House of Representatives from 1964 to 1976
- Glen H. Davidson, senior United States district judge
- Borden Deal, novelist and short-story writer from Pontotoc
- Matthew W. Dogan, president of Wiley College
- Belle Edmondson, diarist and Confederate spy and smuggler
- Ruby Elzy, pioneer black opera singer, played the soprano role of Serena in George Gershwin's Porgy and Bess
- Lanny Flaherty, actor known for the role of Big Al in the 1993 film Blood In Blood Out
- Wayne Flynt, former history professor and author
- Lee Gates (1937–2020), blues guitarist, singer, and songwriter
- Velma Bell Hamilton (1910–2009), NAACP president in Wisconsin
- Cyrus Harris (1817–1888, Chickasaw), politician, among the Chickasaw removed to Indian Territory
- Mac Huddleston, member of the Mississippi House of Representatives from 2008 to 2023
- Kent Hull, former NFL Buffalo Bills center, from Pontotoc
- Cowan F. "Bubba" Hyde (born 1908), Negro League baseball player who played for the Birmingham Black Barons
- William H. Inzer, justice of the Supreme Court of Mississippi from 1965 to 1978
- Cordell Jackson, guitarist, born in Pontotoc
- Estes C. McDaniel, member of the Mississippi House of Representatives from 1964 to 1972
- Max Palmer, professional wrestler, from Pontotoc
- Romie J. Palmer, Illinois jurist and legislator, born in Pontotoc
- Steve Pegues, former Major League Baseball player, from Pontotoc
- R. C. Pitts, basketball player who played in the 1948 Summer Olympics
- James L. Roberts Jr., justice of the Supreme Court of Mississippi from 1992 to 1999
- Kermit Scott, professor of philosophy, once presumed to be the namesake of Kermit the Frog
- Wesley Walls, former National Football League tight end
- Jim Weatherly, singer, songwriter and musician
- Elizabeth H. West (born 1873), librarian and archivist
- Roger Wicker, U.S. senator from Mississippi
- Thomas Hickman Williams, U.S. senator from 1838 to 1839
- Thomas J. Word, member of the U.S. House of Representatives from 1838 to 1839
- Daniel W. Wright, justice of the Supreme Court of Mississippi from 1832 to 1838

== See also ==
- Tupelo National Battlefield
