= Cowan Hyde =

American baseball player (1907–2003)

- Left fielder
- Born: April 10, 1907; Pontotoc, Mississippi, U.S.
- Died: November 20, 2003 (aged 94); St. Louis, Missouri, U.S.
- Batted: Right Threw: Right

Negro league baseball debut
- 1924, for the Memphis Red Sox

Last Negro league appearance
- 1951, for the Chicago American Giants

Career statistics
- Batting average: .266
- Hits: 218
- Home runs: 1
- Runs batted in: 85
- Stolen bases: 45
- Stats at Baseball Reference

Teams
- Memphis Red Sox (1924, 1927, 1938–1950); Birmingham Black Barons (1930); Indianapolis Athletics (1937); Cincinnati Tigers (1937); Chicago American Giants (1951)

Career highlights and awards
- 3x All-Star (1943, 1946)

Cowan Fontella "Bubba" Hyde (April 10, 1907 – November 20, 2003) was an American professional outfielder who played mostly in the Negro leagues from the 1920s to the 1950s. In his baseball career, Hyde played with the Memphis Red Sox, Birmingham Black Barons, Indianapolis Athletics, and the Cincinnati Tigers, as well as various teams from other leagues. An exceptional base stealer and above-average contact hitter, albeit with a low walk-ratio, Hyde participated in two East-West All-Star Games.

== Life and career ==
Hyde was born in Pontotoc, Mississippi, acquiring his baseball and lifelong nickname, "Bubba", during childhood from his sister. At an early age, Hyde's athletic talents became apparent to chief scouts of the Memphis Red Sox, who offered Hyde the opportunity to tryout with the team when he was just 14 years-old. However, after a brief stint with the club, Hyde suffered from homesickness and decided to return to Pontotoc to finish high school. Still, the Red Sox expressed great interest in him, convincing Hyde to return to the team in 1927, hitting a .190 batting average on the season. He furthered his education by attending Morris Brown College and Rust College, where he joined the baseball, football, and track teams. In 1930, Hyde had another brief stint in the Negro leagues, playing with the Birmingham Black Barons and batting .237.

An athlete of modest stature, 5 feet 8 inches and 150 lbs., Hyde compensated for his lack of size with his tremendous speed and agility. Playing with the Indianapolis Athletics in 1937, Hyde made an impression on manager Double Duty Radcliffe who signed him to the Cincinnati Tigers. When Radcliffe moved to the Red Sox organization the following season, he immediately signed Hyde to the club as the starting left fielder, starting a 12-year stint with the team. Because of his above-average power hitting and speed, Radcliffe regularly penciled Hyde into the leadoff spot and gave him the "green light" to steal whenever he had a sizable lead. Throughout the remainder of his Negro league career, Hyde consistently batted around .300, albeit with a low walk-ratio, and participated in the East-West All-Star Game in 1943 and 1946.

Aside from the Negro leagues, Hyde spent parts of 1940 in the Mexican league, averaging .306, before venturing to Chicago to play with the Palmer House All-Stars. A prime candidate to earn a roster spot on a Major League Baseball club, in 1950 he joined the Bridgeport Bees, a minor league affiliate of the Boston Braves organization. In his only season with team, a 40 year-old Hyde batted an impressive .327, earning a position on the Braves' spring training squad, but he was soon cut from the team when Hyde left camp to accompany his pregnant wife to the hospital.

Hyde concluded his time in baseball with the Chicago American Giants in 1951, and four years in the Mandak League, where, despite being in his mid-forties, Hyde hit well above .300. Settling in St. Louis, Missouri, he worked for the General Cable company before retiring in the mid-1980s. He was among the first players inducted into the Negro Leagues Wall of Fame and Hyde had his uniform displayed in the Negro Leagues Baseball Museum. Before succumbing to an illness on November 20, 2003, Hyde held the distinction of participating in the Negro leagues earlier than any other surviving player.
