= N. W. Bradford =

Mississippi politician (1854-1926)

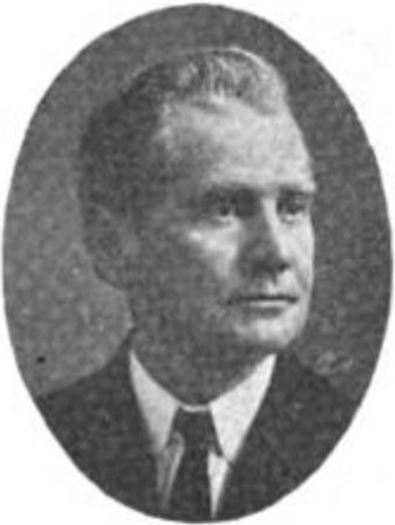
- c. 1917

Member of the Mississippi State Senate from the 31st district
- In office January 1916 – January 1920 Serving with Marshal T. Adams
- Preceded by: W. J. Evans; Frank Burkitt
- Succeeded by: Marshal T. Adams; W. J. Evans

Member of the Mississippi House of Representatives from the Chickasaw County district
- In office January 1904 – January 1908

Personal details
- Born: February 14, 1854 Pontotoc, Mississippi, U.S.
- Died: October 10, 1926 (aged 72) Houston, Mississippi, U.S.
- Party: Democratic
- Spouse: Tula Lee Baskin (m. 1886)
- Children: 4
- Occupation: Lawyer

Nathaniel West Bradford (February 14, 1854 – October 10, 1926) was an American Democratic politician. He was a member of the Mississippi State Senate from the 31st District from 1916 to 1920, and of the Mississippi House of Representatives from 1904 to 1908.

== Early life ==
Nathaniel West Bradford was born on February 14, 1854, in Pontotoc, Mississippi. He was the son of Malcolm Dougherty Bradford and Rosalie (Dandridge) Bradford, and was a descendant of many of the First Families of Virginia. Bradford received his early education in Pontotoc's schools and read law in his father's office before being admitted to the bar at the age of 21.

== Professional and political career ==
Bradford then began practicing law, and he also served as the mayor of Pontotoc, Mississippi. He moved to Houston, Mississippi in 1897, and continued his law practice there. In 1903, he was elected to represent Chickasaw County as a Democrat in the Mississippi House of Representatives, and served that term from 1904 to 1908. In 1915, Bradford was elected to represent the 31st District in the Mississippi State Senate and served from 1916 to 1920. During his tenure in the Senate, Bradford supported enacting laws to increase the quality of Mississippi's roads.

== Personal life and death ==
Bradford was an Odd Fellow, a Woodman of the World, and an elder in the Presbyterian Church. married Tula Lee Baskin on November 24, 1886, in Pontotoc, Mississippi. They had four children: Joe Baskins (died 1915), William Dougherty, Annie, and Paul Williams. Bradford was found dead in his bed in Houston, Mississippi at about 6 AM on October 10, 1926.
