= Velma Bell Hamilton =

American community organizer

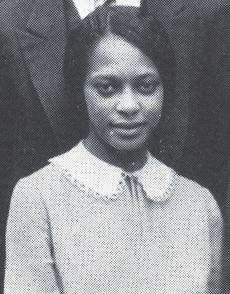
- Velma Bell (later Hamilton), from the 1930 yearbook of Beloit College
- Born: Velma Fern Bell; February 28, 1910; Pontotoc, Mississippi, U.S.
- Died: July 9, 2009 (aged 99); Atlanta, Georgia, U.S.
- Occupations: Educator, community organizer

Velma Fern Bell Hamilton (February 28, 1910 – July 9, 2009) was an American educator and community organizer, based in Wisconsin. She was the founding president of the Madison branch of the NAACP, elected in 1943.

== Early life and education ==
Bell was born in Pontotoc, Mississippi, and raised in Beloit, Wisconsin, the daughter of Walter Bell and Malvina Grace Allen Bell. She graduated from Beloit Memorial High School in 1926 and graduated from Beloit College in 1930. She was the college's first Black member of Phi Beta Kappa. She earned a master's degree in sociology at the University of Wisconsin–Madison in 1933.

== Career ==
Hamilton taught sociology at Bennett College in North Carolina in the 1930s, and was registrar at Tougaloo College in Alabama in the early 1940s, while her husband was teaching there. In 1943, she was the founding president of the Madison branch of the NAACP. From 1950 to 1975, she taught English and was chair of general studies at Madison Vocational School, where she was the first Black faculty member, and for a time the only Black full-time teacher in Madison. She was an evaluator for the North Central Accrediting Association.

Hamilton served on the Governor's Commission on Human Rights and the Wisconsin Arts Board, and was active in other organizations concerning human rights and education. She was a trustee of Beloit College, and a member of the Dane County Commission on Aging, the Wisconsin Retired Teachers Association, and the advisory panel of the Madison YWCA. She held honorary degrees from Lakeland College (1981) and Beloit College (1991). Velma Hamilton Middle School in Madison is named for her in 1992. The Madison Community Foundation honored her as an Asset Builder in 2002.

== Personal life and legacy ==
Bell married soil scientist Harry L. Hamilton in 1934. They had three children, Harry Jr., Patricia, and Muriel. Her husband died in 1996, and she died in 2009, at the age of 99, in Atlanta. The Velma and Harry Hamilton Papers are in the Wisconsin Historical Society. A dining hall at Beloit College is named Hamiltons Café, after her, her son, her daughter, and her granddaughter, all Beloit alumni.
