= Alfred Oscar Coffin =

American academic (1861–1933)

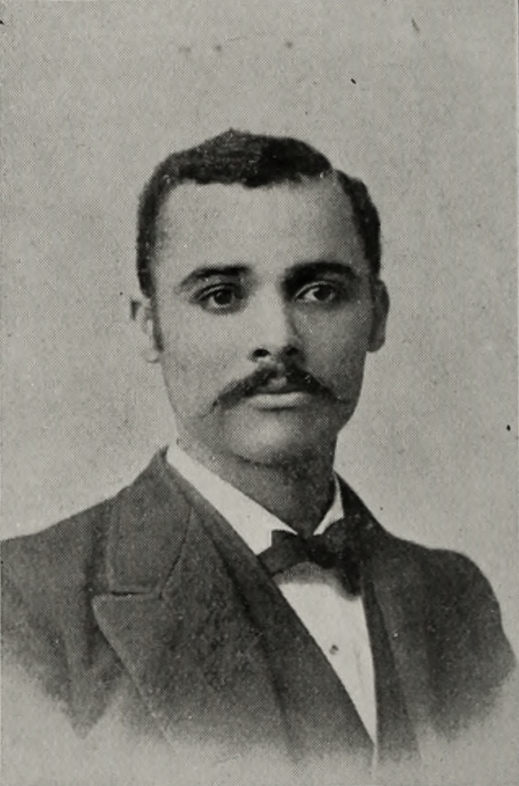
- Born: Alfred Oscar Coffin; May 14, 1861; Pontotoc, Mississippi, U.S.
- Died: September 6, 1933 (aged 72)
- Resting place: Westlawn Cemetery, Kansas City, Wyandotte County, Kansas, USA
- Education: Fisk University; Illinois Wesleyan University (Ph.D.)
- Occupation: Professor

Alfred Oscar Coffin (May 14, 1861 – 1933) was a professor of mathematics and Romance language. He is best known for being the first African American to obtain a PhD in biology.

Coffin earned his bachelor's degree and master's degree at Fisk University. In 1889, he earned his PhD in biology at Illinois Wesleyan University. His thesis was titled "The Origin of the Mound Builders".

In 1887, Coffin taught at Alcorn Agricultural and Mechanical College for two years in Mississippi. From 1889 to 1895, he worked as a professor of mathematics and Romance language at Wiley University at Marshall, Texas. He later worked as the booking agent for John William Boone.

== Early life ==
Coffin was born May 14, 1861, in Pontotoc, Mississippi.
