= 1877 Mississippi gubernatorial election =

- November 6, 1877
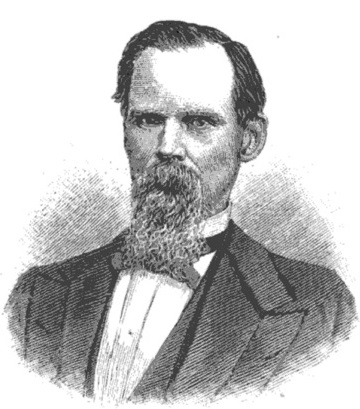
Nominee	John Marshall Stone
Party	Democratic
Popular vote	96,376
Percentage	99.95%
- County results Stone: 90–100%
Governor before election
John M. Stone
Democratic
Elected Governor
John M. Stone
Democratic

The 1877 Mississippi gubernatorial election took place on November 6, 1877, in order to elect the Governor of Mississippi. Incumbent Governor John Marshall Stone ran for election to a first full term. Stone had become governor a year prior, after the resignation of Adelbert Ames.

== General election ==
In the general election, Stone ran unopposed.

=== Results ===
Mississippi gubernatorial election, 1877
Party	Candidate	Votes	%
Democratic	John Marshall Stone (incumbent)	96,376	99.95
Other		47	0.05
Total votes		96,423	100.00
Democratic hold			
