= Emeline Piggott =

Confederate spy during the American Civil War

Emmeline Pigott
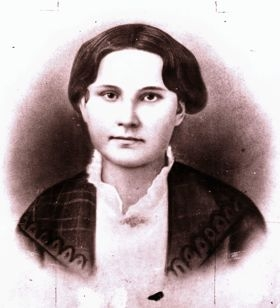
- Born: Emeline Jamison Pigott; December 15, 1836; Carteret County, North Carolina, U.S.
- Died: May 26, 1919 (aged 82)
- Occupation: Spy
- Known for: Espionage while a civilian - blockade running
- Criminal charges: Treason - blockade running against United States during wartime
- Criminal penalty: None

Emeline Jamison Pigott (December 15, 1836 – May 26, 1919) was a spy for the Confederate States Army during the American Civil War. For several years, she hid contraband messages in her skirt and carried them between New Bern, North Carolina, and local sea ports. United States military and civilian law enforcement almost caught her several times. In February 1865, U.S. Army Provost Marshal Major Graves arrested her for treason against the United States on the charge of espionage - blockade running. The U.S. Army released her some time later to her home.

== Early life ==
Emeline Pigott was born on December 15, 1836, in Harlowe Township, Carteret County. She was the daughter of Colonel Levi Whitehurst Pigott and Elizabeth Dennis. She grew up in Harlowe. When 25, she moved with her family to Crab Point, near present-day Morehead City.

== Civil War ==
Just across Calico Creek from Pigott's farm lay an encampment of Confederate Army soldiers of the 26th North Carolina Infantry. They were garrisoned there to guard the North Carolina coast from reclaiming by United States military forces. Pigott nursed sick and wounded enemy soldiers. She collected mail from the soldiers and would also sneak medical supplies, food, and clothing into the nearby woods, hiding them in marked, hollow trees.

Pigott met and fell in love with a Confederate Army private, Stokes McRae. Born to a farm family in Montgomery County, he graduated from the University of North Carolina but led a life of idleness. He then enlisted in the Confederate States Army. McRae and his Confederate Army regiment were sent to Virginia. Enroute, forces under U.S. Army Gen. Meade defeated them at the Battle of New Bern.

Pigott had camp-followed the 26th North Carolina to New Bern, hoping to help. In March 1862, the United States Army reclaimed New Berne after only four hours' fighting. Pigott reportedly remained in New Bern until the last train carried Confederate Army wounded to Kinston. She remained there for several months nursing the wounded. New Bern thus was returned to the United States, in which it remains.

McCrae's Confederate Army 26th North Carolina fought in Virginia. Then, returned to eastern North Carolina to guard the Confederate States capital, Richmond, Virginia, from reclaiming by the United States. In May 1863, McCrae's regiment was attached to the Confederate States Army of Northern Virginia and headed north. On July 1, 1863 the regiment fought in the Battle of Gettysburg, where U.S. Army General Meade's forces defeated Confederate States Army General R. E. Lee's. McRae, then a sergeant major, was hospitalized with a shattered thigh. He died on August 2, 1863.

In December 1863, Pigott made her way back to Concord, when the U.S. Army reclaimed Kinston. She worked her way down to the coast and her home near Morehead City.

== Spying on the United States Army ==
Pigott organized enemy fishermen to spy for her. She passed this military intelligence to the Confederate Army. Pigott also entertained U.S. Army soldiers at her parents' farm, distracting them so her sister, Abigail's, husband, Rufus Bell, could carry food into the nearby woods for the Confederate Army soldiers in hiding.

In February 1865, United States Army Provost Marshal Major Graves arrested Pigott and Bell for treason against the United States - blockade running and transporting contraband supply and messages across enemy lines. Her US Army jailors released her some time later to her home. US Army soldiers searched Bell and released him when they found no contraband. While the Provost Marshall was looking for a woman to search Pigott, she allegedly swallowed some treason-incriminating messages and tore others into tiny pieces. The Provost Marshall detected her concealing about 30 pounds of contraband in her voluminous skirts. Secured in specially sewn pockets in her skirts and petticoats were: 1 pair boots, 2 pairs of pants, a shirt, a cap, a dozen linen collars, 12 hankies, 50 skeins of wool, needles, a lot of spools of thread, toothbrushes, hair combs, 3 pocket knives, several pairs of gloves, razors, and 4-5 pounds of candy.

== Trial ==
The U.S. Army transported Pigott to New Berne to stand trial. They permitted her cousin, Mrs. Levi Woodburg Pigott, to accompany her. The U.S. Army jailed the two in the Jones House in New Berne. (It stands, today.) The women claimed one night someone tried to kill them with chloroform. They said that they broke a window in their room and took turns breathing fresh air until they were able to summon the guards' attention.

Over the next month, the Provost Marshall scheduled Piggott for trial on several occasions, but she was never brought to trial. The U.S. Provost Marshall unexpectedly released Pigott to return home. After her release, the United States Army maintained surveillance over her activities until the Confederate States Army's defeat in 1865..

== Later life ==
Pigott never married and continued to live in her homeplace. She founded the Morehead City chapter of the United Daughters of the Confederacy, which was later named in her honor.

Emeline Jamison Pigott is buried near Emeline Place (street) in Morehead City. Her gravesite is guarded by a padlocked fence. As is a statue representing her Confederate Army Sgt. McRae, an artillery-shot away in Beaufort.

== See also ==
- Belle Edmondson
