= Kermit Scott =

American counselor and philosophy professor

Theodore Kermit Scott Jr. (October 18, 1936 – May 26, 2008) was an American counselor and professor of philosophy. Scott was a childhood friend of Muppets creator Jim Henson, who was incorrectly presumed to be the namesake of Kermit the Frog, one of Henson's most famous creations.

== Biography ==
Scott was born in Pontotoc, Mississippi, on October 18, 1936. He grew up in Leland, Mississippi, which was also the hometown of Jim Henson, who would one day create the Muppets. Scott's brother-in-law, Aaron Moss, recalled that the relationship in which Scott and Henson had as children, "Kermit had moved to Leland at an early age. Those two kids met and were childhood buddies. They spent a lot of time running up and down the creek, like most kids did."

Henson and his family moved away from Leland, and subsequently the two lost contact with one another. Years later, however, Scott discovered that Henson had named one of his most famous Muppets Kermit the Frog; it was long reported that the character was named after Scott. However, Karen Falk, head archivist for the Jim Henson Company, has stated that the shared name was coincidental.

Scott enrolled in Millsaps College in Jackson, Mississippi, and also studied in Germany on a scholarship. He received his doctorate in philosophy from Columbia University in New York City.

He taught Philosophy as a professor at Yale University and Millsaps College. He then taught at Purdue University for 36 years. Scott retired from teaching to pursue a master's degree in social work, which he earned in 1993. He pursued his second career as a counselor. Scott and his wife, Aadron Scott, co-founded two organizations as to advocate for the poor, the Food Finders Food Bank of Lafayette, Indiana, and the Welfare Rights Organization.

Scott died on May 26, 2008, at the age of 71 in Lynchburg, Virginia. He was survived by his wife, Aadron Scott, to whom he had been married for more than 50 years. He was also survived by his children, David Scott, Aadron Rausch, and Tracey Scott. Scott had been a resident of Monroe, Virginia.
