= Odd Fellows Cemetery (Starkville, Mississippi) =

Historic cemetery in Oktibbeha County, Mississippi, US

- U.S. National Register of Historic Places
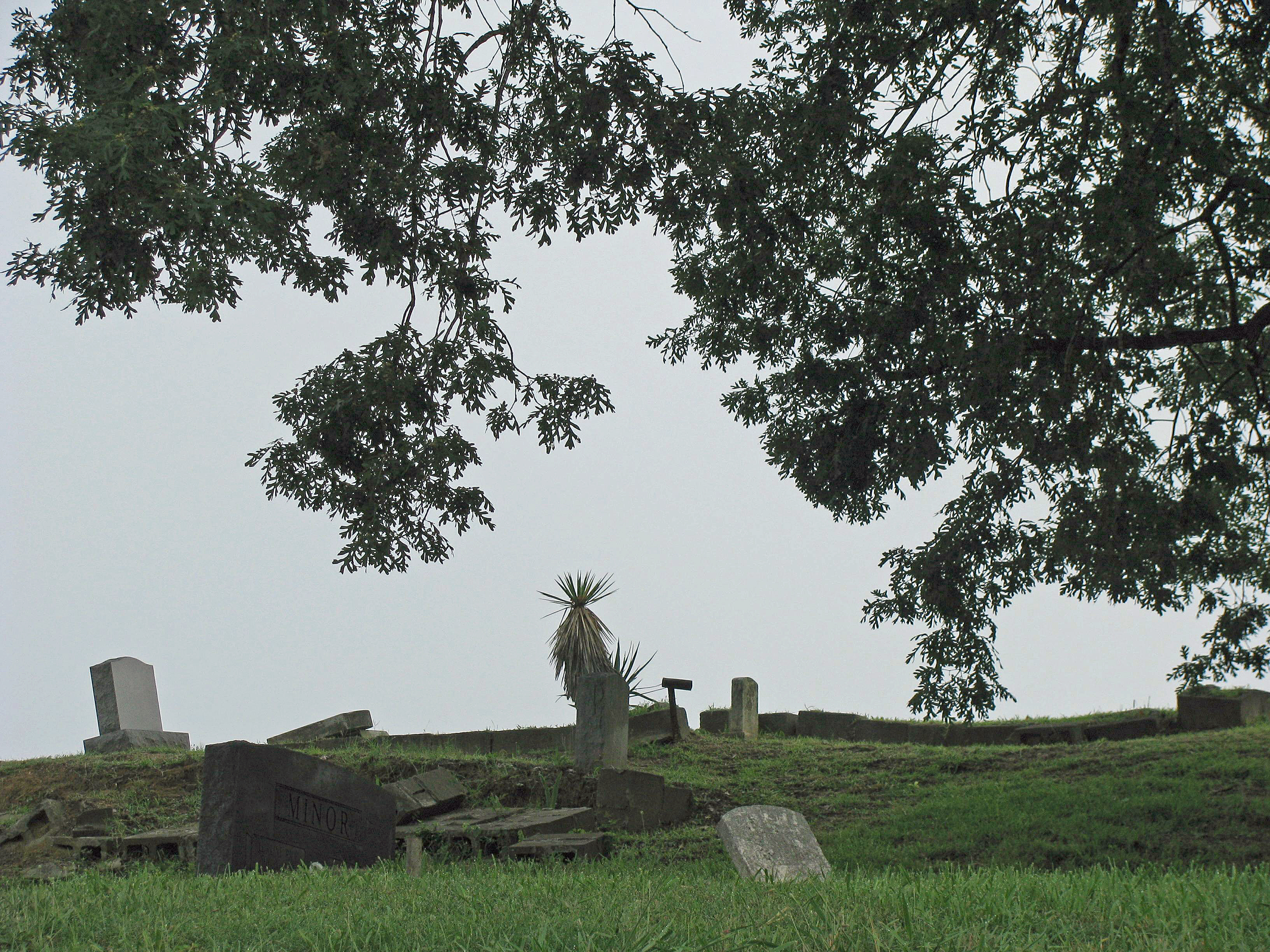

- Location within Mississippi Location within the United States
- Location: Jct. of US 82 and Henderson Street, Starkville, Oktibbeha County, Mississippi, U.S.
- Coordinates: 33°28′0″N 88°49′15″W
- Area: 3 acres (1.2 ha)
- NRHP reference No.: 90001064
- Added to NRHP: July 24, 1990

The Odd Fellows Cemetery in Starkville, Mississippi is a historic, 3-acre (1.2 ha) African-American cemetery that was listed on the National Register of Historic Places in 1990.

Odd Fellows Cemetery is one of the oldest African American cemeteries in Mississippi. It was founded by lodge number 2948 of the Grand Order of Odd Fellows of America. Burials began in the 19th century, but permanent markers were not in use until the 1920s. In 1939 the Odd Fellows Lodge sold the cemetery to National Funeral Home, a white-owned company that continued to operate it as an African-American cemetery. The property has changed several times since then.

== See also ==
- List of Odd Fellows cemeteries
- National Register of Historic Places listings in Oktibbeha County, Mississippi
