= 1881 Mississippi gubernatorial election =

- November 8, 1881
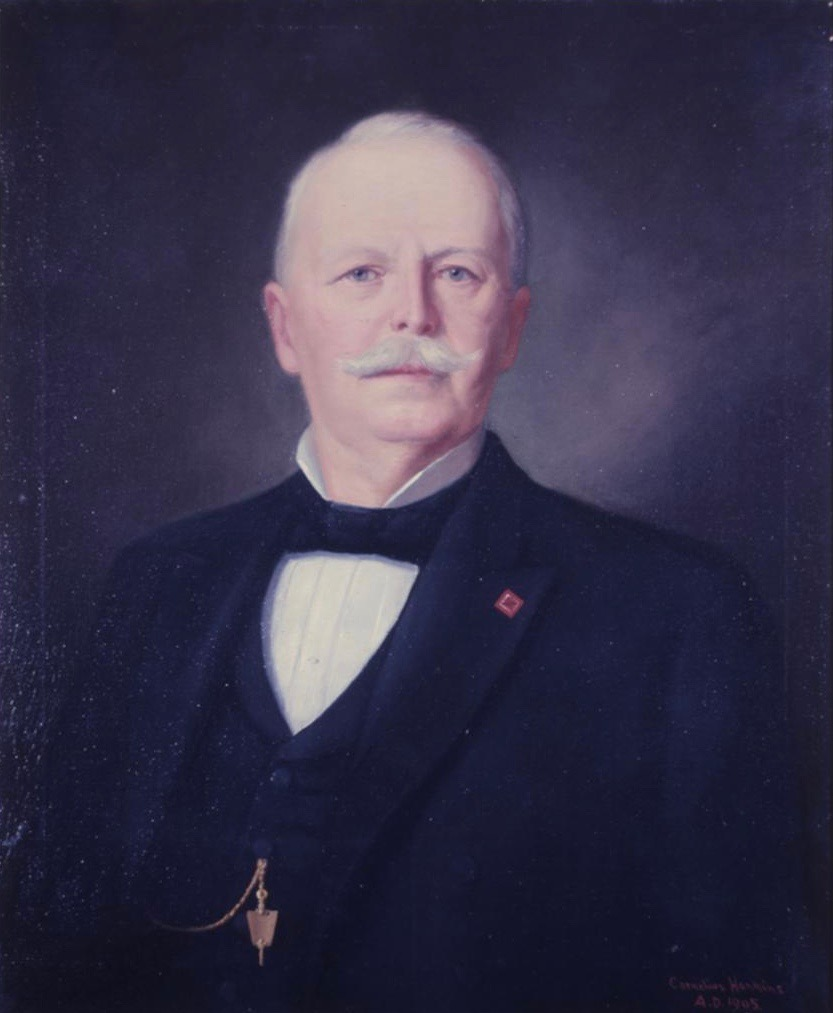

Nominee	Robert Lowry	Benjamin King
Party	Democratic	Independent Democrat
Alliance		Republican; Greenback
Popular vote	77,727	52,009
Percentage	59.92%	40.08%
- County results Lowry: 50–60% 60–70% 70–80% 80–90% 90–100% King: 50–60% 60–70% 70–80%
Governor before election
John M. Stone
Democratic
Elected Governor
Robert Lowry
Democratic

The 1881 Mississippi gubernatorial election took place on November 8, 1881, in order to elect the Governor of Mississippi. Incumbent Governor John M. Stone ran for reelection to a second full term, but lost the Democratic nomination to Robert Lowry.

== General election ==
In the general election, Democratic candidate Robert Lowry defeated Benjamin King. The election was marred by massive fraud, and would mark the last time until 1975 that a candidate running against the official Democratic nominee received more than 40% of the vote.

=== Results ===
Mississippi gubernatorial election, 1881
Party	Candidate	Votes	%
Democratic	Robert Lowry	77,727	59.92
Independent Democrat	Benjamin King	52,009	40.08
Total votes		129,736	100.00
Democratic hold			
