= Marshal T. Adams =

American politician (1886–1987)

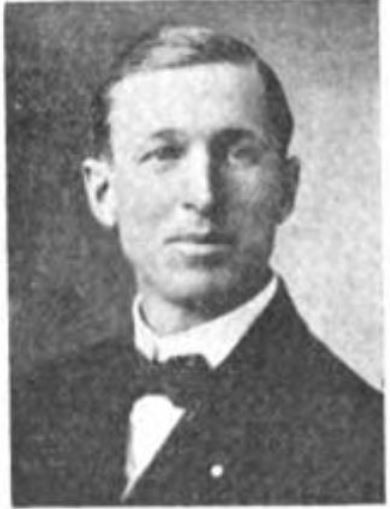
- c. 1917

Member of the Mississippi State Senate from the 31st district
- In office January 1916 – January 1924 Serving with W. J. Evans (1920-1924); N. W. Bradford (1916-1920)
- Preceded by: W. J. Evans; Frank Burkitt
- Succeeded by: W. J. Evans; John Harvey Neal

Personal details
- Born: September 23, 1886 Pontotoc County, Mississippi, U.S.
- Died: October 27, 1987 (aged 101)
- Party: Democratic

Marshal (or Marshall) Turner Adams (September 25, 1886 – October 27, 1987) was an American politician. He was a member of the Mississippi State Senate from the 31st District from 1916 to 1924.

== Biography ==
Marshal Turner Adams was born on September 25, 1886, in Chesterville, Pontotoc County, Mississippi. He was the son of George Turner Adams, who was a farmer and merchant; and Emma Jane (Carruth) Adams. Adams attended the public schools of Pontotoc County and neighboring Lee County. From 1903 to 1907, Adams attended a college preparatory school in McKenzie, Tennessee. He began attending the University of Mississippi in 1907 and entered the school's Law Department in 1909. From 1908 to 1910, Adams was a member of the university baseball team. He graduated with a Bachelor of Laws degree in 1911. After graduation, he moved to Pontotoc, Mississippi, and began practicing law there.

== Political career and later life ==
In 1915, Adams was elected to represent the 31st District as a Democrat in the Mississippi State Senate for the 1916–1920 term. In 1919, Adams was re-elected to this position and served in the 1920–1924 term. By the early 1930s, Adams served as a district attorney. By 1986, Adams was the oldest living alumnus of the University of Mississippi. Adams died at the age of 101 on October 27, 1987.

== Personal life ==
Adams was a Methodist and a member of the Freemasons. He was a member of the Sigma Chi fraternity. He married Willye Mae Fletcher in 1913. Adams had at least three children, whose names included Marshall Jr., George, and Aileen.
