= Anselm J. McLaurin =

American politician (1848–1909)

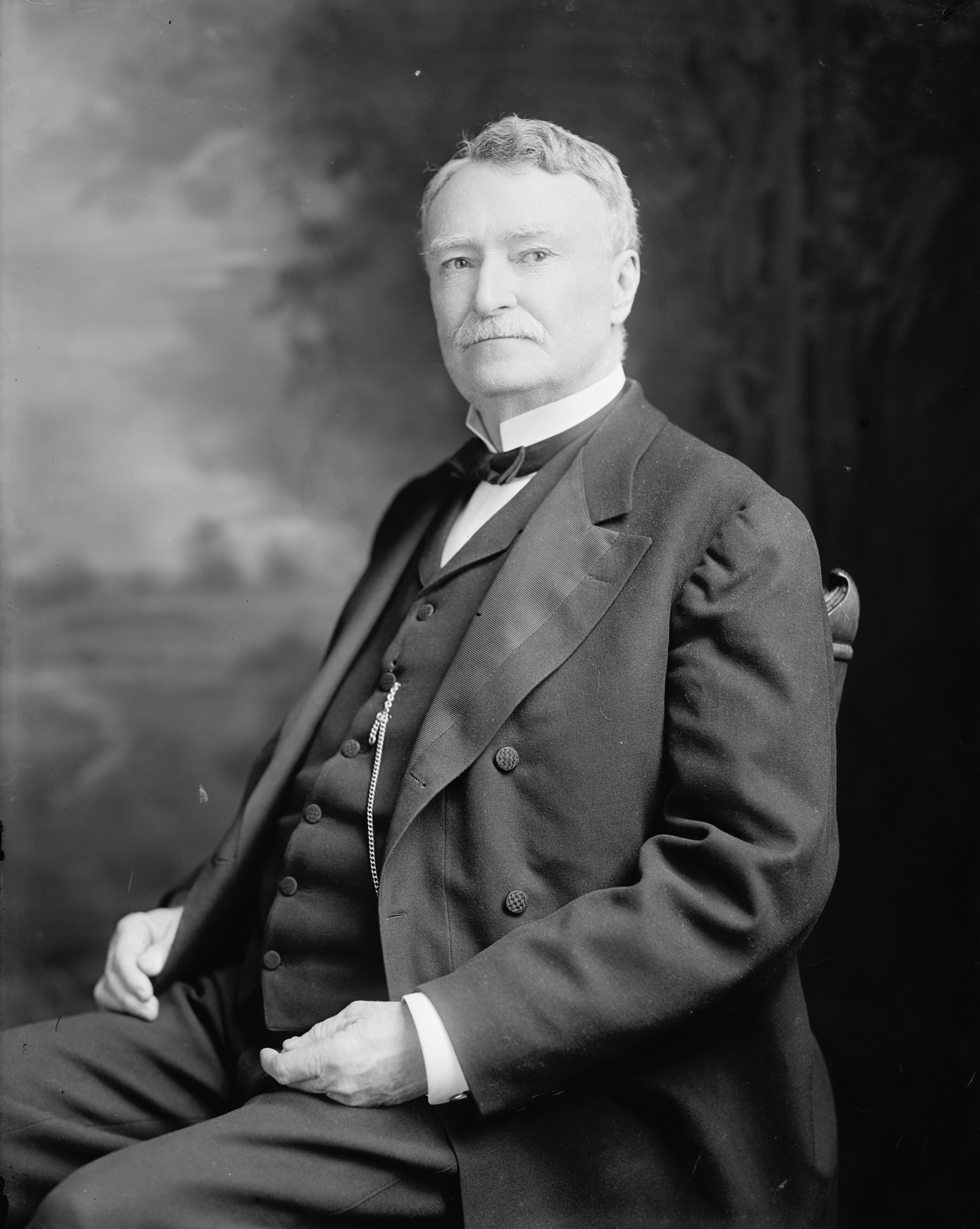

United States Senator from Mississippi
- In office March 4, 1901 – December 22, 1909
- Preceded by: William V. Sullivan
- Succeeded by: James Gordon
- In office February 7, 1894 – March 3, 1895
- Preceded by: Edward C. Walthall
- Succeeded by: Edward C. Walthall

34th Governor of Mississippi
- In office January 20, 1896 – January 16, 1900
- Lieutenant: J. H. Jones
- Preceded by: John M. Stone
- Succeeded by: Andrew H. Longino

Personal details
- Born: Anselm Joseph McLaurin; March 26, 1848 Brandon, Mississippi, U.S.
- Died: December 22, 1909 (aged 61) Brandon, Mississippi, U.S.
- Party: Democratic
- Spouse: Laura Elvira Victoria Rauch
- Children: 8 (including Daisy McLaurin Stevens)
- Relatives: Robin Williams (great-great grandson); Zelda Williams (great-great-great granddaughter)

Military service
- Allegiance: Confederate States
- Branch/service: Confederate Army
- Years of service: 1864–1865
- Rank: Private; Captain (possibly)
- Unit: 3rd (Ashcraft’s) Battalion, Mississippi Cavalry
- Battles/wars: American Civil War; Battle of Egypt Station; Battle of Selma

Anselm Joseph McLaurin (March 26, 1848 – December 22, 1909) was an American politician. A member of the Democratic Party, he served as the 34th governor of Mississippi from 1896 to 1900. He was the last Confederate veteran elected governor of Mississippi.

Prior to being governor, he served as United States Senator from Mississippi from 1894 until 1895 and then again from 1901 until his death in 1909.

== Early life ==
McLaurin was born on March 26, 1848, in Brandon, Mississippi, the son of Ellen Caroline (née Tullus) and Lauchlin McLaurin III. He married Laura Elvira Rauch and had eight children, including Daisy McLaurin Stevens.

== Career ==
At the age of 16, McLaurin enlisted in the 3rd Mississippi Artillery of the Confederate States Army.

He then practiced law in Raleigh, Mississippi. In 1871, he was elected as district attorney at the age 21 and was described as "one of the foremost lawyers in the State". He participated in the convention for the writing of the Mississippi Constitution in 1890 and was described as a free-coinage man. A Democrat, as were most White people in the South through the mid-twentieth century, McLaurin was elected by the state legislature to the U.S. Senate, serving from 1894 to 1895.

He was the first Governor of Mississippi to be elected under the Mississippi Constitution of 1890, which disenfranchised most black people by raising barriers to voter registration. These changes essentially ended the competitiveness of the Republican Party in the state and severely weakened the Populist Party. The last Confederate veteran elected as governor, McLaurin won the 1895 election, defeating Populist Frank Burkitt. He served from 1896 to 1900.

At Hazlehurst in 1898, McLaurin explained in a speech that one of the causes of the depleted state treasury was inadequate taxation of the railroad corporations.

In October 1898, McLaurin traveled by train to Forest, Mississippi, after white rioting in nearby Harperville. Black citizens had resisted the arrest of one of their community, killing one white man. A mob of whites quickly gathered, killing nine black people by the next day. The county sheriff and a posse arrested some black people, while the white lynch mob continued to kill their black neighbors on sight. The New Orleans Picayune said that 11 black men were killed and one white. The sheriff took several black men under armed guard to Meridian, Mississippi, to protect them from the white mobs in Forest.

McLaurin returned to the U.S. Senate in 1901 after being elected by the state legislature to that seat in 1900; he was re-elected on January 19, 1904.

== Death and legacy ==
He died of heart disease at age 61 on December 22, 1909, at his home in Brandon, Mississippi. He was sitting in a rocking chair in front of his fireplace.

A great-great-grandson of McLaurin was actor and comedian Robin Williams, who was given McLaurin as his middle name.

== See also ==
- List of members of the United States Congress who died in office (1900–1949)

Party political offices
Preceded by John Marshall Stone	Democratic nominee for Governor of Mississippi; 1895	Succeeded by Andrew H. Longino
U.S. Senate
Preceded by Edward C. Walthall	U.S. senator (Class 2) from Mississippi; 1894–1895; Served alongside: James Z. George	Succeeded by Edward C. Walthall
Political offices
Preceded by John M. Stone	Governor of Mississippi; 1896-1900	Succeeded by Andrew H. Longino
