= John M. Stone Cotton Mill =

- U.S. National Register of Historic Places
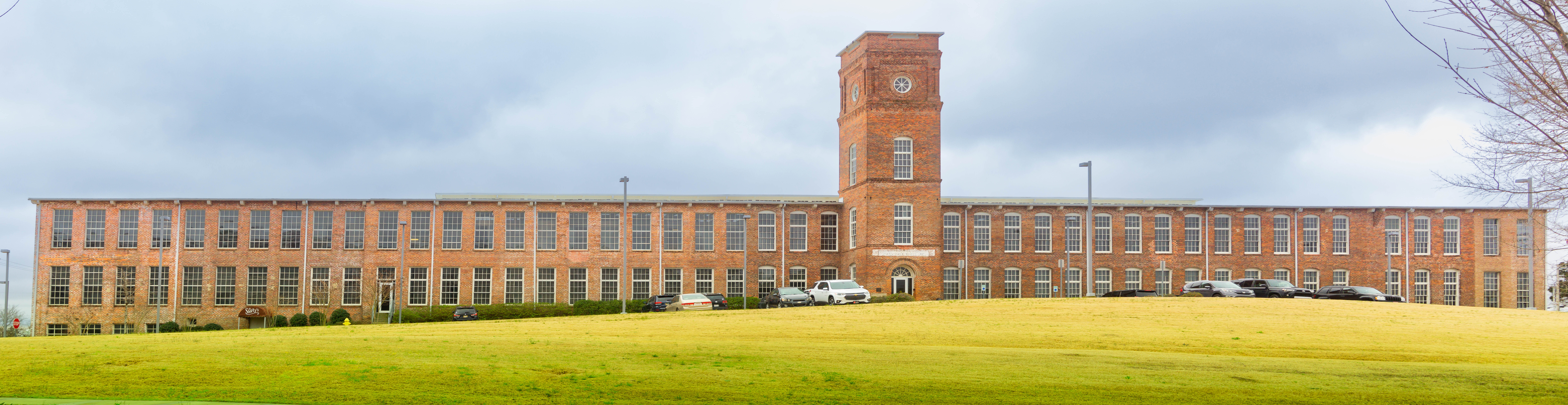

- Location within Mississippi
- Location: 600 Russell St., Starkville, Mississippi
- Coordinates: 33°27′26″N 88°48′09″W
- Built: 1902
- Built by: W.T. Christopher
- Architect: Stewart W. Cramer
- NRHP reference No.: 75001055
- Added to NRHP: April 29, 1975

The John M. Stone Cotton Mill is a building in Starkville, Mississippi listed on the National Register of Historic Places. Built in 1902, it was a cotton mill named for John Marshall Stone. It was renamed the E.E. Cooley Building after being purchased by Mississippi State University in 1965; afterward, the building was used for almost fifty years to house the university's physical plant. The building reopened in 2015 as an event center named The Mill at MSU.
