= John Marshall Stone =

American politician

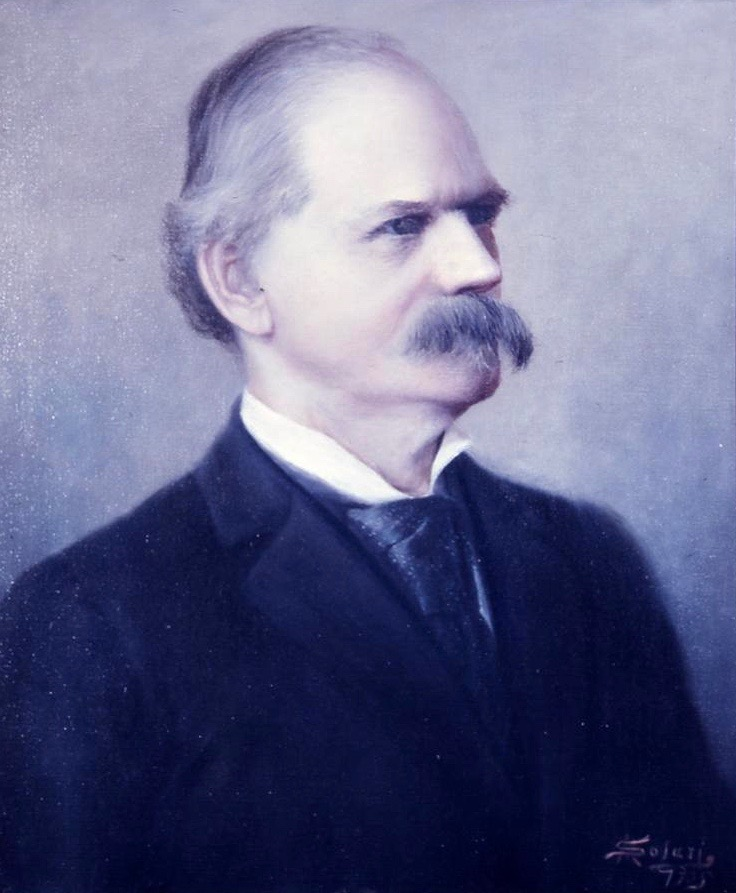
- Portrait of Stone, c. 1890's.

31st and 33rd Governor of Mississippi
- In office March 29, 1876 – January 2, 1882
- Lieutenant: Vacant (1876–1878); William H. Sims (1878–1882)
- Preceded by: Adelbert Ames
- Succeeded by: Robert Lowry
- In office January 13, 1890 – January 20, 1896
- Lieutenant: M. M. Evans
- Preceded by: Robert Lowry
- Succeeded by: Anselm J. McLaurin

Member of the Mississippi State Senate
- In office 1869–1876

Personal details
- Born: April 30, 1830 Milan, Tennessee
- Died: March 26, 1900 (aged 69) Holly Springs, Mississippi
- Party: Democratic
- Spouse: Mary Coman
- Children: 5

Military service
- Allegiance: Confederate States
- Branch/service: Confederate States Army
- Years of service: 1861 - 1865
- Rank: Colonel
- Commands: 2nd Mississippi Infantry Regiment
- Battles/wars: American Civil War

John Marshall Stone (April 30, 1830 – March 26, 1900) was an American politician from Mississippi. A Democrat, he served longer as governor of that state than anyone else, from 1876 to 1882 and again from 1890 to 1896. He approved a new constitution in 1890 passed by the Democratic-dominated state legislature that disfranchised most African Americans, excluding them from the political system for more than 75 years.

== Early life ==
Born in Milan, Tennessee, Stone was the son of Asher and Judith Stone, natives of Virginia who were part of the migration to the west. He did not attend college since his family was fairly poor, but he studied a great deal and eventually taught school. He lived in Jacks Creek, Tennessee before moving to Tishomingo County, Mississippi in 1855. Stone became a station agent at Iuka when the Memphis and Charleston Railroad opened.

== American Civil War ==
With the outbreak of the American Civil War in 1861, Stone enlisted in the Confederate States Army that April. He commanded Company K of the 2nd Mississippi Infantry Regiment and saw action in Virginia. In 1862, Stone was elected colonel of his regiment. Stone was highly commended by his division commander Maj. Gen. Henry Heth, and in 1864, he frequently commanded the brigade. In January 1865, he recruited in Mississippi and commanded local troops countering Stoneman's 1865 Raid. He and his men were captured in North Carolina and imprisoned in Camp Chase, Ohio; later transferred to Johnson's Island, Ohio.

== Political career ==
At the end of the war, Stone returned to Tishomingo County. He was elected mayor and treasurer. In 1869, he won a race to become state senator, winning re-election in 1873. State elections were marked by fraud and violence; the Red Shirts, a paramilitary group, worked to disrupt and suppress black voting and turned Republicans out of office. After Governor Adelbert Ames resigned in 1876, Stone, who was president pro tempore of the Mississippi State Senate at that time, served as the acting governor.

In the 1877 election, Stone won the governor's office as a Democrat. In 1881 he was defeated for re-election by Robert Lowry. Stone became governor again after winning the 1889 election. The gubernatorial term was extended through 1896 by the new Mississippi Constitution of 1890.

== Later life ==
Following his term as governor, in 1899, Stone accepted a position as the 2nd President of Mississippi A&M (now Mississippi State University) in Starkville. Stone died in Holly Springs, Mississippi, in 1900, at 69. He is buried at Oak Grove Cemetery in Iuka, Mississippi.

== Personal life ==
After the war, Stone married Mary G. Coman in 1872. The couple had two children who died young. They adopted three children of John's brother and raised them as their own.

== Legacy and honors ==
- In 1916 Stone County, Mississippi, was named in his honor posthumously.
- Stone Boulevard at Mississippi State is named for him.
- The John M. Stone Cotton Mill in Starkville was formerly named in his honor. However, it was renamed the E.E. Cooley Building after being purchased by Mississippi State University (MSU) in 1965. This building was used for many years to house the university's physical plant. The building reopened in 2015 as an event center.

== See also ==
- List of governors of Mississippi
- List of lieutenant governors of Mississippi
- List of presidents of Mississippi State University

Party political offices
Vacant Title last held by Benjamin G. Humphreys	Democratic nominee for Governor of Mississippi; 1877	Succeeded by Robert Lowry
Preceded by Robert Lowry	Democratic nominee for Governor of Mississippi; 1889	Succeeded by Anselm J. McLaurin
Political offices
Preceded by Alexander K. Davis	Lieutenant Governor of Mississippi; 1876–1878	Succeeded by William H. Sims
Preceded by Adelbert Ames	Governor of Mississippi; 1876–1882	Succeeded by Robert Lowry
Preceded by Robert Lowry	Governor of Mississippi; 1890–1896	Succeeded by Anselm J. McLaurin
Academic offices
Preceded by General Stephen D. Lee	President of Mississippi State University; 1899–1900	Succeeded by John Crumpton Hardy
