= Greensboro Street Historic District =

Historic district in Mississippi, United States

- U.S. National Register of Historic Places
- U.S. Historic district
- Location within Mississippi Location within the United States
- Location: Greensboro St., (original); Earnest Jones Jr. Dr., Greensboro St., Louisville St., Main St. W., Raymond St., Yeates St., (increase); Starkville, Mississippi
- Coordinates: 33°27′42″N 88°49′29″W
- Built: 1870 and 1834
- Architectural style: Late 19th And 20th Century Revivals, Bungalow/Craftsman, Late Victorian (original); Greek Revival, Gothic Revival, Queen Anne (increase)
- NRHP reference No.: 82003112 and 08000673
- Added to NRHP: June 14, 1982 (original); July 10, 2008 (increase)

Greensboro Street Historic District in Starkville, Mississippi is a linear historic district along a residential boulevard that was listed on the National Register of Historic Places in 1983 and increased in 2008.

The originally designated area includes 46 structures. It stretches about 0.5 miles (0.80 km) along what was referred to locally as Greensboro Street or Greensboro Road or simply Greensboro. Specifically it runs from 302 and 305 Greensboro, near Cushman and Yeats Streets, going west to 606 and 607 Greensboro, at the top of a hill just before Curtis Street.

It is significant for representing architectural styles of about six decades of Starkville's history, starting with the Greek Revival style of houses at 410, 413, and 522 Greensboro that date from the late 1860s and 1870s.

Some houses are eclectic and include several styles, such as 404 Greensboro which includes elements of Greek Revival, Italianate, and Gothic architecture.

It includes Queen Anne style houses built during 1880–1900 at 306, 504, 515, 518, 601, and 607 Greensboro.

Colonial Revival is represented, as is Bungalow/Craftsman architecture from the 1920s on.

The Old Middle School Building (1927) is one of very few buildings in Mississippi built in Jacobethan Style.

The increase to the district in 2008 added 80 structures, some off of Greensboro, and upgraded the evaluation of nine structures from marginal to contributing.
