= Robert Lowry (Mississippi politician) =

32nd Governor of Mississippi

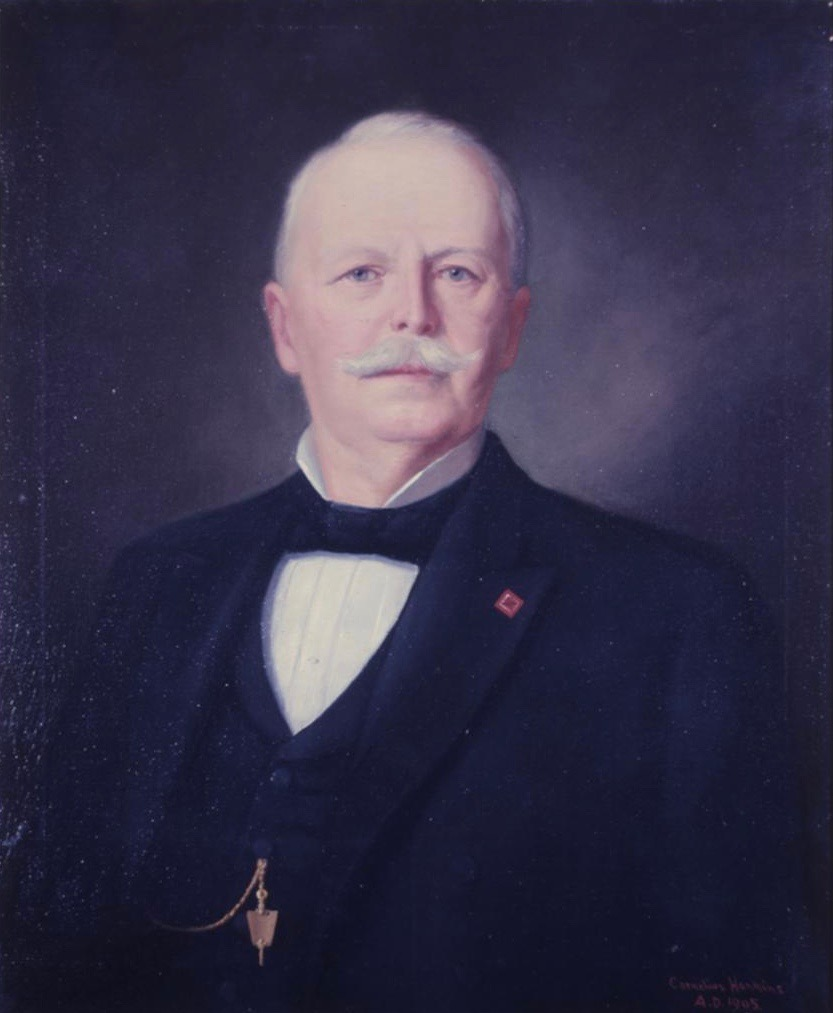
- Official portrait, 1905

32nd Governor of Mississippi
- In office January 2, 1882 – January 13, 1890
- Lieutenant: G. D. Shands
- Preceded by: John M. Stone
- Succeeded by: John M. Stone

Personal details
- Born: March 10, 1829 Chesterfield District, South Carolina, U.S.
- Died: January 19, 1910 (aged 80) Jackson, Mississippi, U.S.
- Party: Democratic

Military service
- Allegiance: Confederate States
- Branch/service: Confederate States Army
- Years of service: 1861–1865
- Rank: Brigadier-General
- Commands: 6th Mississippi Infantry Regiment; Lowry's Brigade
- Battles/wars: American Civil War: Battle of Shiloh (WIA); Battle of Corinth; Battle of Magnolia Church; Atlanta Campaign; Tennessee Campaign; Campaign of the Carolinas (POW)

Robert Lowry (March 10, 1829 – January 19, 1910) was an American politician and lawyer who served as the 32nd governor of Mississippi from 1882 to 1890. Before entering politics, he was a senior officer of the Confederate States Army who commanded infantry in the Western Theater of the American Civil War.

== Early life and military service ==
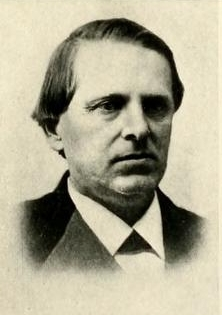
Lowry as State Senator

Robert Lowry was born in Chesterfield District, South Carolina on March 10, 1829, and was raised in Mississippi. During the American Civil War, he enlisted as a private in the Confederate States Army. He quickly received a commission in the 6th Mississippi Infantry Regiment. He commanded the regiment at the Battle of Shiloh, where it suffered very heavy casualties, and he was wounded. In early 1864, he led the troops that were sent to put down the local uprising of citizens near Jones County, Mississippi. Later, Lowry commanded a brigade of Mississippi regiments in the Third Corps, Army of Tennessee; in February 1865, he was finally promoted to brigadier-general. When the war was over, he returned to legal practice in Brandon. Lowry briefly served in the Mississippi State Senate after the war (1865–1866). Massive fraud in the gubernatorial election of 1881 resulted in the election of Lowry over the Independent People's Party candidate, Benjamin King.

== Governor (1882–1890) ==
Between 1882 and 1890, he was the Democratic governor of Mississippi, serving two four-year terms. He could be called a Bourbon Democrat. The Farmers' Alliance movement continued to show local action in Yazoo County and most areas of the state.

In September 1889, Lowry ordered the state militia to Leflore County, where organizing by the Colored Farmers' National Alliance and Cooperative Union sparked false rumors of an impending Black "uprising." Militia troops killed an estimated 25 Black people.

Political activity related to peonage and racial discrimination in the Mississippi delta and other areas of the state led to violence during his term of office. Rapid industrial development occurred during his administration as well as the founding of the first state-supported women's college at Columbus.

== Personal life ==
Lowry was related to J.A.W. Lowry, a lawyer and politician in Bossier Parish in northwestern Louisiana.

== See also ==
- List of Confederate States Army generals

== Sources ==
- Eicher, John H., and David J. Eicher, Civil War High Commands. Stanford: Stanford University Press, 2001. ISBN 978-0-8047-3641-1.
- Sifakis, Stewart. Who Was Who in the Civil War. New York: Facts On File, 1988. ISBN 978-0-8160-1055-4.
- Warner, Ezra J. (1959). Generals in Gray: Lives of the Confederate Commanders (1st ed.). Baton Rouge: Louisiana State University Press. OCLC 445052.

Party political offices
Preceded by John M. Stone	Democratic nominee for Governor of Mississippi; 1881, 1885	Succeeded by John M. Stone
Political offices
Preceded by John M. Stone	Governor of Mississippi; 1882–1890	Succeeded by John M. Stone
Non-profit organization positions
Preceded by Edward Mayes	President of the Mississippi Historical Society; 1893	Succeeded by Stephen D. Lee
