= List of Confederate monuments and memorials in Mississippi =

Confederate monuments and memorials in Mississippi

Note: This is a sublist of List of Confederate monuments and memorials from the Mississippi section.

This is a list of Confederate monuments and memorials in Mississippi that were established as public displays and symbols of the Confederate States of America (CSA), Confederate leaders, or Confederate soldiers of the American Civil War. Part of the commemoration of the American Civil War, these symbols include monuments and statues, flags, holidays and other observances, and the names of schools, roads, parks, bridges, counties, cities, lakes, dams, military bases, and other public works. (Note: "In an effort to assist the efforts of local communities to re-examine these symbols, the SPLC launched a study to catalog them. For the final tally, the researchers excluded nearly 2,600 markers, battlefields, museums, cemeteries and other places or symbols that are largely historical in nature.")

This list does not include figures connected with the origins of the Civil War or white supremacy, but not with the Confederacy.

== Monuments and memorials ==
There are at least 131 public spaces with Confederate monuments in Mississippi.

=== State capitol ===
- Confederate Monument, Mississippi Department of Archives and History Building, dedicated June 1891. In front of the Old Capitol Museum. Unusual in that a former slave and Republican member of the legislature, John F. Harris, spoke passionately in favor of it, while some whites spoke against it. "Every colored member voted 'Aye'."
- Women of the Confederacy Monument (1917), on south side of Capitol grounds. Cost was $20,000, sculpted by Belle Marshall Kinney. "The monument features two female figures and one male figure, a wounded and dying soldier. To the left of the soldier, a sympathetic woman is presenting a palm of glory to the soldier, a symbol of triumph even in death. Above both the soldier and the woman stands 'Fame'. She, in turn, is placing a wreath on the head of the woman in recognition of her contribution to the Confederate cause. Below the bronze figures are four inscriptions facing each direction, and dedicated to 'our' mothers, daughters, sisters and wives. On the southern face, which is the front of the monument, is a quote from Jefferson Davis which, among other virtues, praises the women 'whose pious ministrations to our wounded soldiers soothed the last hours of those who died far from the objects of their tenderest love.'"

=== State symbols ===
- Various state insignia incorporate the 1984–2020 state flag
- Mississippi National Guard seal features the second Flag of Mississippi (incorporating the Confederate Battle Flag) flying over a soldier at attention.

=== State holidays ===
- Robert E. Lee Birthday, celebrated with Martin Luther King, Jr. Day on the third Monday of January
- Confederate Memorial Day, celebrated the last Monday of April

=== Buildings ===
- Greenwood: Confederate Memorial Building
- Hattiesburg: Jefferson Davis Hall at Pearl River Community College
- Jackson: Robert E. Lee Building
- Oxford: Lamar Hall (1977) at University of Mississippi see schools below
- Biloxi: Beauvoir, the post-war home of Jefferson Davis,

=== Monuments ===
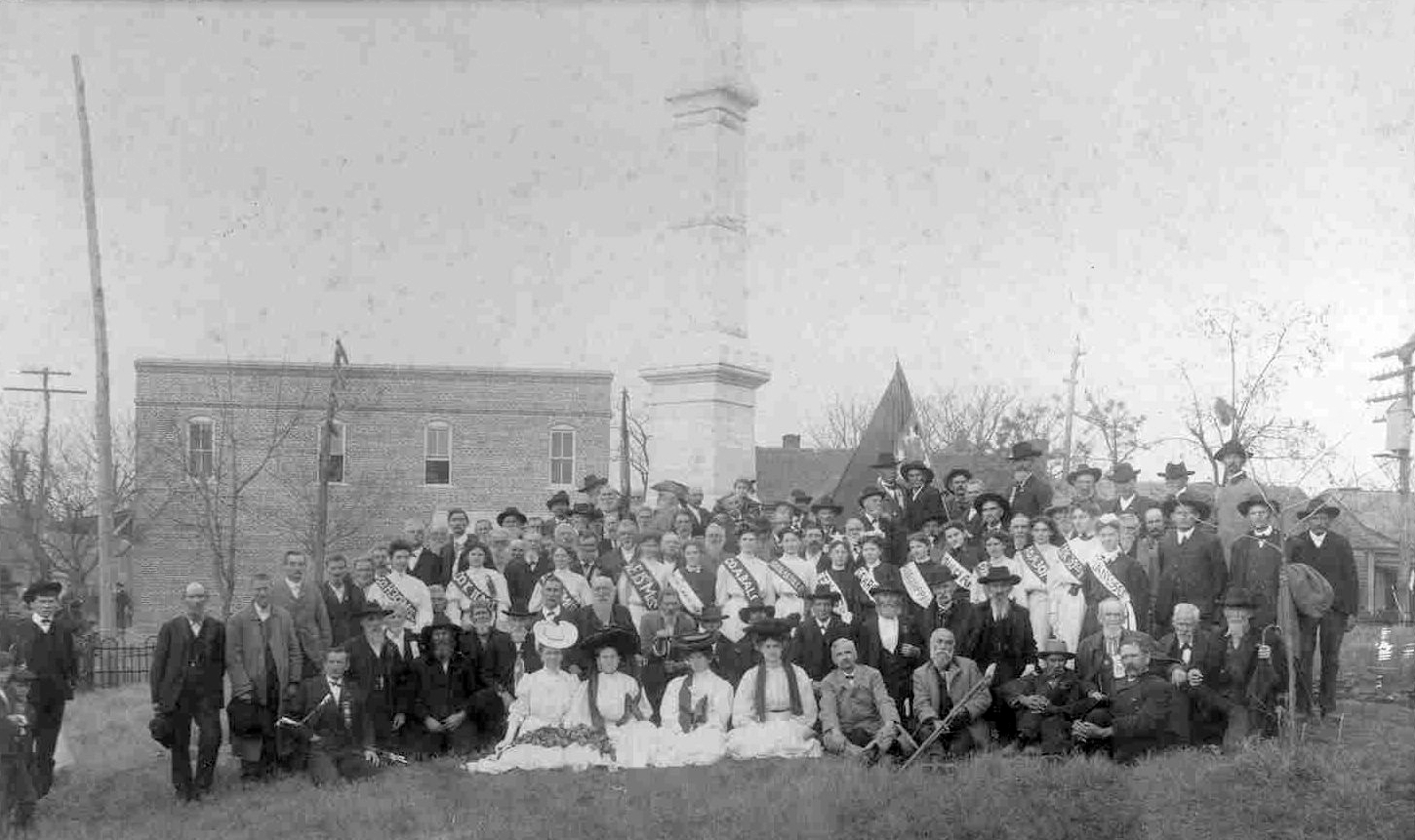
Unveiling of Confederate Monument in Carrollton, Mississippi, 1905

==== Courthouse monuments ====
- Brandon: Rankin County Confederate Monument (1907)
- Carrollton: Confederate Monument and flag, Carroll County Courthouse (1905)
- Charleston: Confederate Monument
- Cleveland: Confederate Monument (1908) by the Bolivar Troop Chapter of UDC, Bolivar County
- Columbus: Lowndes County Confederate Monument (1912)
- Corinth: Col. William P. Rogers statue (1895, moved to grounds of Alcorn County courthouse 1920)
- De Kalb: Confederate Monument on courthouse grounds
- Ellisville: Jones County Courthouse and Confederate Monument
- Greenville: Confederate Monument (1909), erected by United Daughters of the Confederacy. One face: "For those who encountered the perils of war in the defense of the sacred cause of states rights and constitutional government. // Jefferson Davis." Another side: "The sublimest word in the English language is duty. // Robert E. Lee // No brave battle for truth and right was ever fought in vain. // Randolph H. M'Kim." Another side: "It is due the truth of history that the fundamental principles for which our fathers contended should be often reiterated in order that the purpose which inspired them may be correctly estimated and the purity of their motives be abundantly vindicated. // Charles B. Galloway"
- Greenwood: Confederate Monument (1913)
- Gulfport: Confederate Monument (1911)
- Hattiesburg: Confederate Memorial (1910) by UDC
- Hazlehurst: Confederate Monument (1917)
- Kosciusko: Attala County Courthouse and Confederate Monument (1911)
- Laurel: Confederate Memorial (1912)
- Lexington: Confederate Monument (1908)
- Macon: Confederate Memorial Monument (1901)
- Meridian: Confederate Monument (1912)
- Oxford: "Oxford is one of the few small Southern towns with two Confederate monuments. It was a compromise between two factions of the United Daughters of the Confederacy, one group wanting the statue placed on Courthouse Square, the other arguing that it should be on the campus of the University of Mississippi." Confederate Monument (1907). Artist: John A. Stinson. Figure of Confederate soldier at parade rest, facing south. Furled Confederate flag.
- Philadelphia: Confederate Monument (1912)
- Port Gibson: Confederate Monument (1900)
- Quitman: Clarke County Courthouse and Confederate Monument (1911)
- Raymond: Confederate Monument (1908)
- Ripley: Confederate Monument (1911, destroyed 1970) (Note: In May 1970 the memorial was hit by a truck and destroyed. The money from the insurance company was not sufficient to restore it. Widener, p. viii)
- Sumner: Confederate Monument (1913)
- Tupelo: Confederate Monument (1906, moved to Lee County Courthouse square in the 1930s)

==== Other public monuments ====
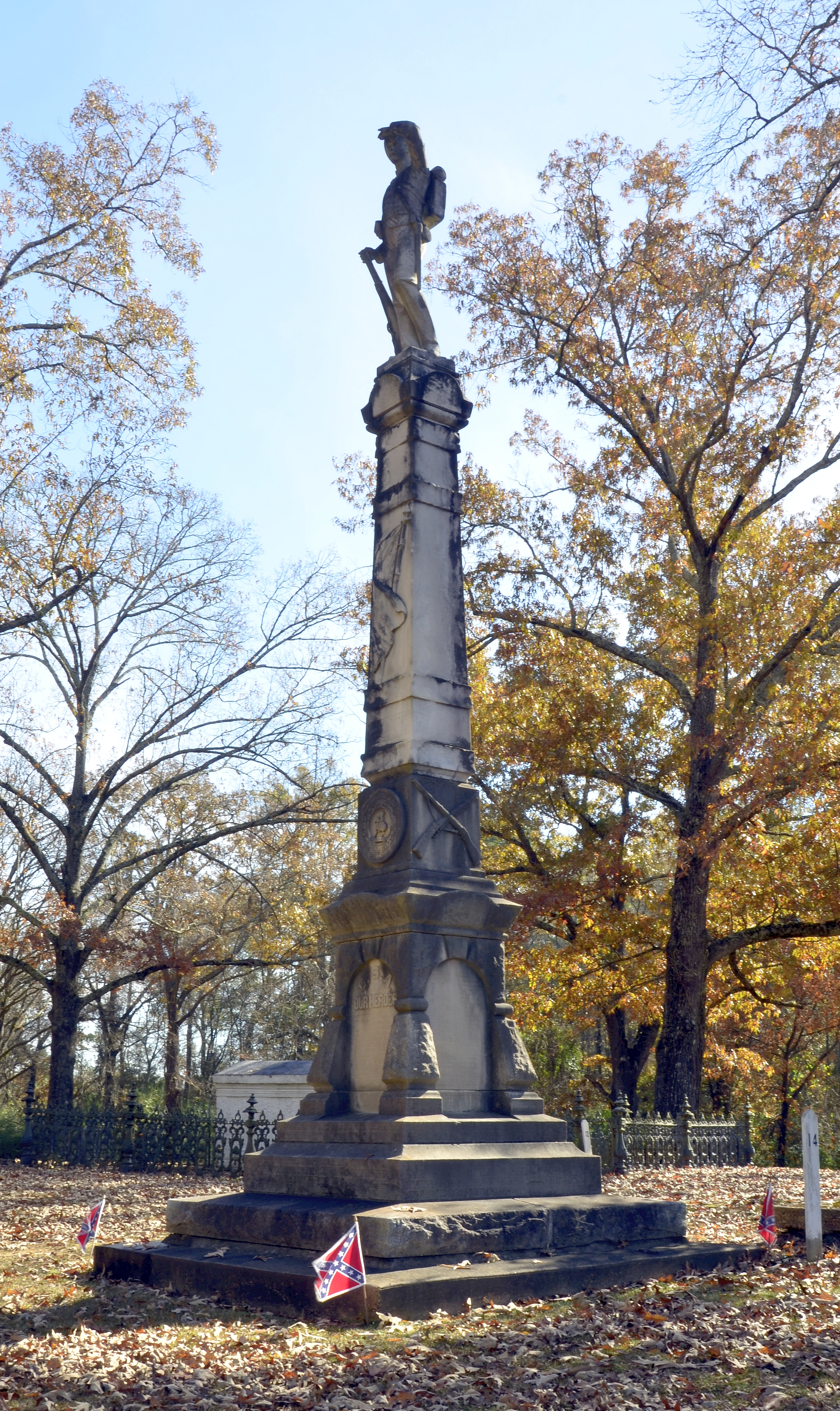
Old Aberdeen Cemetery

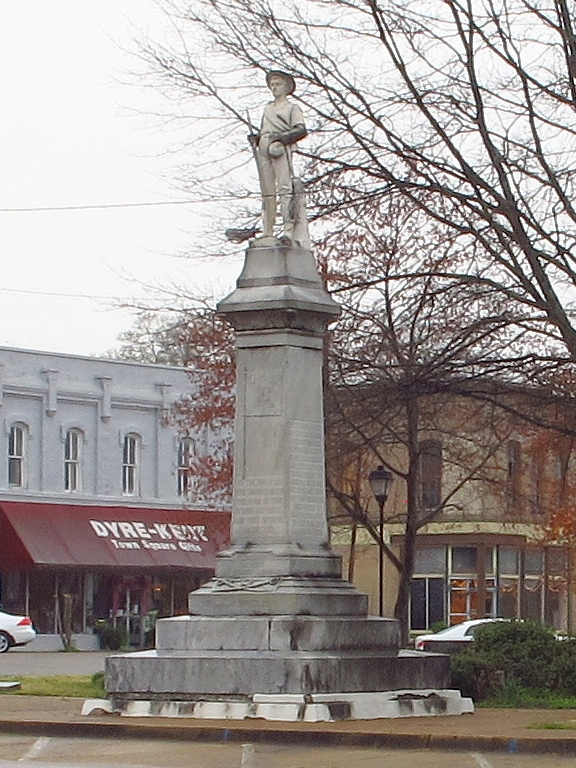
Grenada, Mississippi

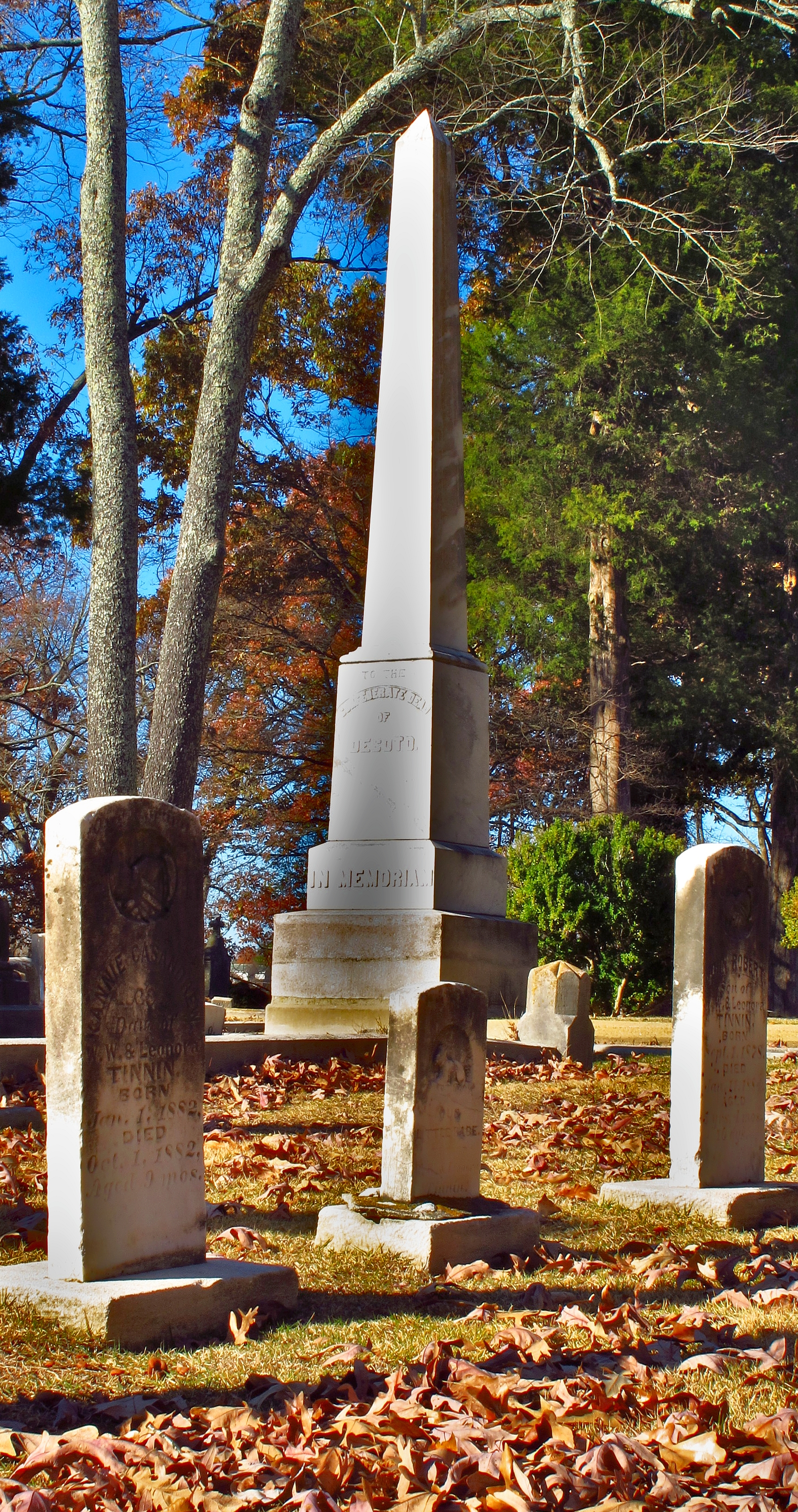
Hernando Memorial Cemetery

- Aberdeen: Confederate Monument in Old Aberdeen Cemetery (1900)
- Amory: Amory's Tribute to the Heroes of 1861–1865 (1924)
- Beulah: Confederate Monument (1905), Beulah Cemetery
- Biloxi:
  - Tomb of the Unknown Confederate Soldier
  - Beauvoir, the post-war home of Jefferson Davis, contains many monuments including:

- President Jefferson Davis and Sons (2008), a life-size bronze statue by sculptor Gary Casteel and commissioned by the Sons of Confederate Veterans (SCV) to commemorate the 150th anniversary of the birth of Jefferson Davis. The statue features Davis standing with his arms around both his son Joe, and Jim Limber, a mixed-race stepchild of the Davis family who the SVC called "a person lost in history by revisionist historians, who felt his existence would impair their contrived notions of Davis". The SCV first offered the statue to the American Civil War Center at the Tredegar Iron Works in Richmond, Virginia in order to balance the importance of a statue already located there depicting Lincoln with his son while they visited the burned-out Confederate capital in 1865. When the center would not "guarantee where or whether the statue would be displayed or explain how it might be interpreted", the SCV rescinded its offer. The statue was eventually placed at the SVC-managed Jefferson Davis Presidential Library and Museum at Beauvoir in 2010.

- Brookhaven: Confederate Monument, Rose Hill Cemetery
- Brooksville: Our Heroes Monument (1911)
- Canton: Howcott Monument to Loyal Servants of the Harvey Scouts (1894)
- Clinton: Confederate Monument (1928), Clinton Cemetery
- Columbus:
  - Confederate Monument (1894), Friendship Cemetery
  - Monument to Confederate Dead (1873), Friendship Cemetery
- Corinth: Corinth Confederate Memorial (1992)
- Crystal Springs: Confederate Monument, Crystal Springs Cemetery
- Duck Hill: Confederate Soldiers Monument (1908)
- Fayette: Confederate Soldier Sculpture (1904)
- Forest: Confederate Monument, Western Cemetery
- Greenville: Confederate Monument, Greenville Cemetery
- Greenwood: Confederate Memorial Building (1915)
- Grenada: Confederate Monument (1910) in Public Square
- Hattiesburg: Forrest County Confederate Memorial (1910)
- Heidelberg: Confederate Statue (1911)
- Hernando: DeSoto County Confederate Monument, Hernando Memorial Cemetery
- Liberty: Confederate Monument (1871), the first Confederate monument in Mississippi.
- Louisville: Confederate Monument (1921)
- Natchez: Confederate Monument (1890)
- Okolona: Our Confederate Dead (1905)
- Oxford:
  - To Our Confederate Dead 1861-1865. In University Circle, at the intersection of University Ave. "Oxford is one of the few small Southern towns with two Confederate monuments. It was a compromise between two factions of the United Daughters of the Confederacy, one group wanting the statue placed on Courthouse Square, the other arguing that it should be on the campus of the University of Mississippi." Erected 1906 by Albert Sidney Johnston Chapter 379 U.D.C. In 2019, the Faculty Senate of the university unanimously requested that the statue be removed. Organizations representing undergraduate and graduate students and staff also requested its removal. Despite this, the process of getting approval for its removal was described as "daunting". According to Brice Noonan, Chair of the Faculty Senate, "A number of faculty have left this university because they just don't feel safe or comfortable here. It's the first thing you see when you drive onto campus. It's not welcoming.”
  - Lamar Hall, University of Mississippi, named for Lucius Quintus Cincinnatus Lamar II, Who helped draft Mississippi’s articles of secession and was the Confederacy's ambassador to Russia.
  - Longstreet Hall, University of Mississippi, named for Augustus Baldwin Longstreet, president of the University during the Civil War, a defender of secession and slavery, long-time friend of John C. Calhoun, mentor of his nephew James Longstreet, a leading Confederate general and aide to Robert E. Lee.
  - George Hall, named for James Z. George, Confederate politician and colonel in the Confederate Army, later U. S. Senator.
  - In Ventress Hall there is "an original Tiffany stained glass window [which] depicts a mustering of the University Greys, a company of University of Mississippi students and faculty who fought in the Civil War."
- Pontotoc: Confederate Monument in town square, dedicated in 1919, or the 1930s
- Port Gibson: Claiborne County's Tribute to Her Sons Who Served in the War of 1861–65. (1906)
- University: Confederate Monument
- Vaiden: Vaiden Confederate Monument (1912)

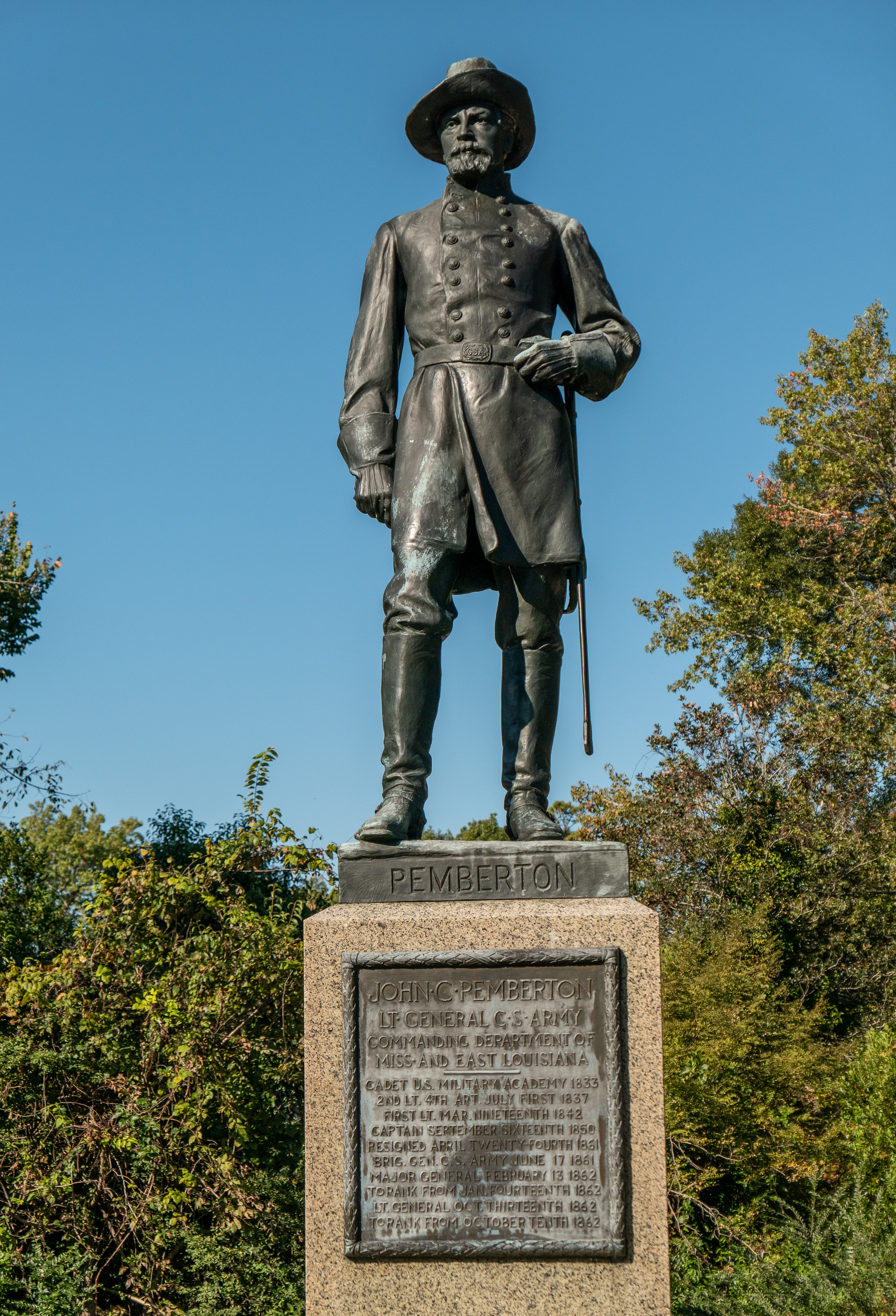
John C. Pemberton at Vicksburg National Military Park

- Vicksburg:
  - Cedar Hill Cemetery: Soldiers' Rest Confederate Monument (1893), where an estimated 5,000 Confederate soldiers are buried.
  - Vicksburg National Military Park: Kentucky memorial composed of bronze statues of Abraham Lincoln and Jefferson Davis, both native Kentuckians.
  - Vicksburg National Military Park: Lt. Gen. Stephen D. Lee statue (1909).
  - Vicksburg National Military Park: Lt. Gen. John C. Pemberton statue, sculpted by Edmond Thomas Quinn.
  - Vicksburg National Military Park: Texas Monument (1961), listing all Texas units on the Vicksburg defensive line, in Walker's Texas Division, and in Joseph E. Johnston's Army.
  - Vicksburg National Military Park: Missouri Monument, one of two state memorials on the battlefield dedicated to soldiers of both armies, located where two opposing Missouri regiments clashed in battle, dedicated on October 17, 1917, during the National Peace Jubilee.
- West Point:
  - Confederate Monument (1907)
  - The Battle of Ellis Bridge Monument (1994)
- Winona: Confederate Memorial Statue (1909)
- Yazoo City: Confederate Monument

=== Inhabited places ===
- Benton County (1870) named for CSA Brig. Gen. Samuel Benton who was also a politician that attended the Mississippi secessionist convention.
- Forrest County (1908)
- Gloster, named for CSA Captain Arthur Willis Gloster.
- Jefferson Davis County (1906)
- Lee County (1866)
- City of Stonewall

=== Water features and dams ===
- Hattiesburg:
  - Jefferson Davis Lake
  - Jefferson Davis Lake Dam

=== Roads ===
- Bay St. Louis: Jeff Davis Drive
- Beaumont:
  - Jeff Davis Parkway
  - Robert E. Lee Street
- Biloxi: Jefferson Davis Avenue
- Bogue Chitto:
  - Beauregard Street
  - Lee Drive
- Corinth: Confederate Street
- De Kalb: Jeff Davis Road
- Duck Hill: Jeff Davis Road
- Florence: Robert E. Lee Drive
- Greenwood: Robert E. Lee Drive
- Hattiesburg:
  - Bedford Forrest Road
  - Robert E. Lee Road
- Hollandale: Jeff Davis Road
- Holly Springs: Van Dorn Avenue
- Indianola:
  - Jefferson Davis Drive
  - Stonewall Drive
- Leakesville: Jeff Davis Road
- Lexington: Robert E. Lee Street
- Long Beach: Jeff Davis Avenue
- Lucedale: Robert E. Lee Road
- Marion: Confederate Drive
- Meridian: Jeff Davis School Road
- Moss Point:
  - Anderson Road
  - Barron Road
  - Beauregard Road
  - Bragg Road
  - Breckinridge Road
  - Cleburne Road for Patrick Cleburne
  - Early Road
  - Ewell Road for Richard Stoddert Ewell
  - Forrest Road
  - Hood Road
  - Joseph E. Johnston Road
  - Kirby Smith Road
  - Longstreet
  - Magruder Road
  - Pemberton Road
  - Pickett Road
  - Robert E. Lee Road
  - Van Dorn
- New Albany: Robert E. Lee Drive
- Oxford:
  - Jefferson Davis Drive
  - Lamar Avenue (the main thoroughfare), named for Lucius Q. C. Lamar drafter of Mississippi's articles of succession.
- Pascagoula:
  - Baker Road
  - Hardee Road
  - Imboden Road
  - Jeb Stuart Road
  - Mosby Road
  - Robertson Road
  - Wheeler Road
- Picayune:
  - Jefferson Davis Parkway
  - Longstreet Lane
  - Pemberton Place
- Prairie: Jeff Davis Road
- Senatobia:
  - Beauregard Street
  - Forrest Avenue
  - Longstreet Lane
- Tupelo:
  - Beauregard Street
  - Confederate Avenue
  - Jeb Stuart Street
  - Robert E. Lee Drive
- Vicksburg National Military Park
  - Pemberton Circle, at the location of the John C. Pemberton monument.
  - Pemberton Avenue, road passing the site where Pemberton surrendered his forces to Ulysses S. Grant.
- Waveland: Jeff Davis Avenue
- Wesson: Beauregard Road

=== Highways ===
- Jefferson Davis Highway
- Lee Highway

=== Schools ===
- Biloxi: Jeff Davis Elementary School- now Back Bay Elementary School.
- Brooklyn:
  - Forrest County Agricultural High School (1916)
  - South Forrest Attendance Center (1960)
- Caledonia: Caledonia High School: The school's athletic teams are nicknamed the "Confederates."
- Greenwood: Davis Elementary School
- Hattiesburg:
  - North Forrest Elementary School
  - Jefferson Davis Hall at Pearl River Community College
- Jackson: The School Board has announced the following elementary schools will be renamed before the 2018–2019 school year:
  - Lee Elementary School (1922) -now Shirley Elementary School.
  - Jefferson Davis Elementary School- now Barack Obama Elementary School.
  - George Elementary School, named for James Zachariah George, who signed the Mississippi Secession Ordinance and drafted the state constitution that denied voting rights to black citizens.
- Oxford:
  - Jeff Davis Elementary School (1959)
  - University of Mississippi ("Ole Miss").
    - Confederate Cemetery Memorial (1906)
    - The school's athletic teams are nicknamed the "Rebels."
    - From 1979 to 2003, its mascot was Colonel Reb.
    - The name "Ole Miss" itself was how slaves once addressed the mistress of the plantation. It can be found on campus, on signs, sweatshirts, and in the football cheer.
    - Various plaques have been installed and modified to try and contextualize the school's history.
    - Lamar Hall (1977) memorializes Lucius Q. C. Lamar, a slaveholder who drafted the Mississippi's order of secession and funded his own CSA regiment. Post-war, he agitated for white supremacy, such as a speech before the 1875 election which he said "involved the supremacy of the unconquered and unconquerable Saxon race,"
- Rolling Fork: Sharkey Issaquena Academy (private school). The school's athletic teams are nicknamed the "Confederates."
- Starkville: statue of Stephen D. Lee, the youngest Confederate general and first president of the college which became Mississippi State University. Erected in 1909.

=== Photos ===
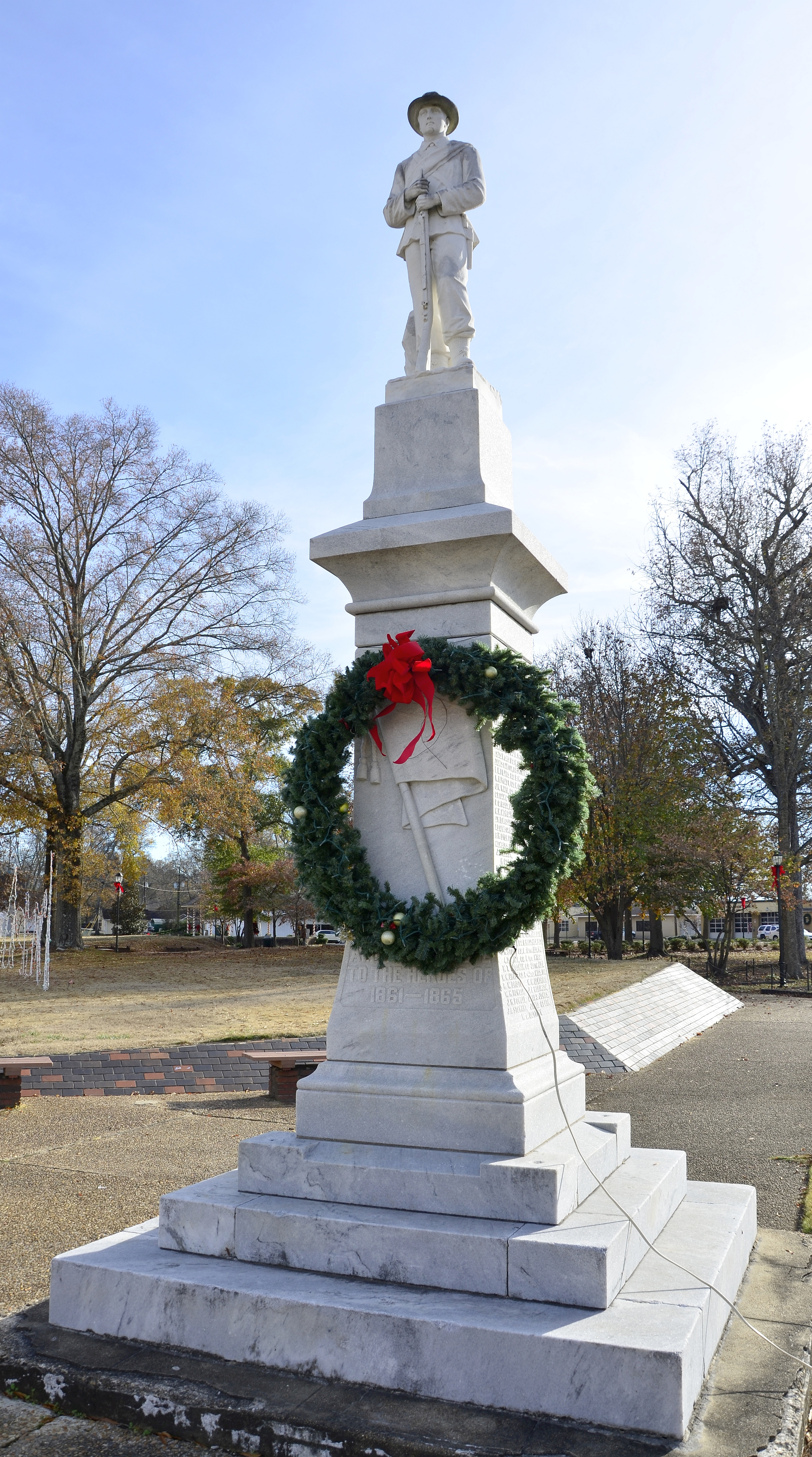
Amory

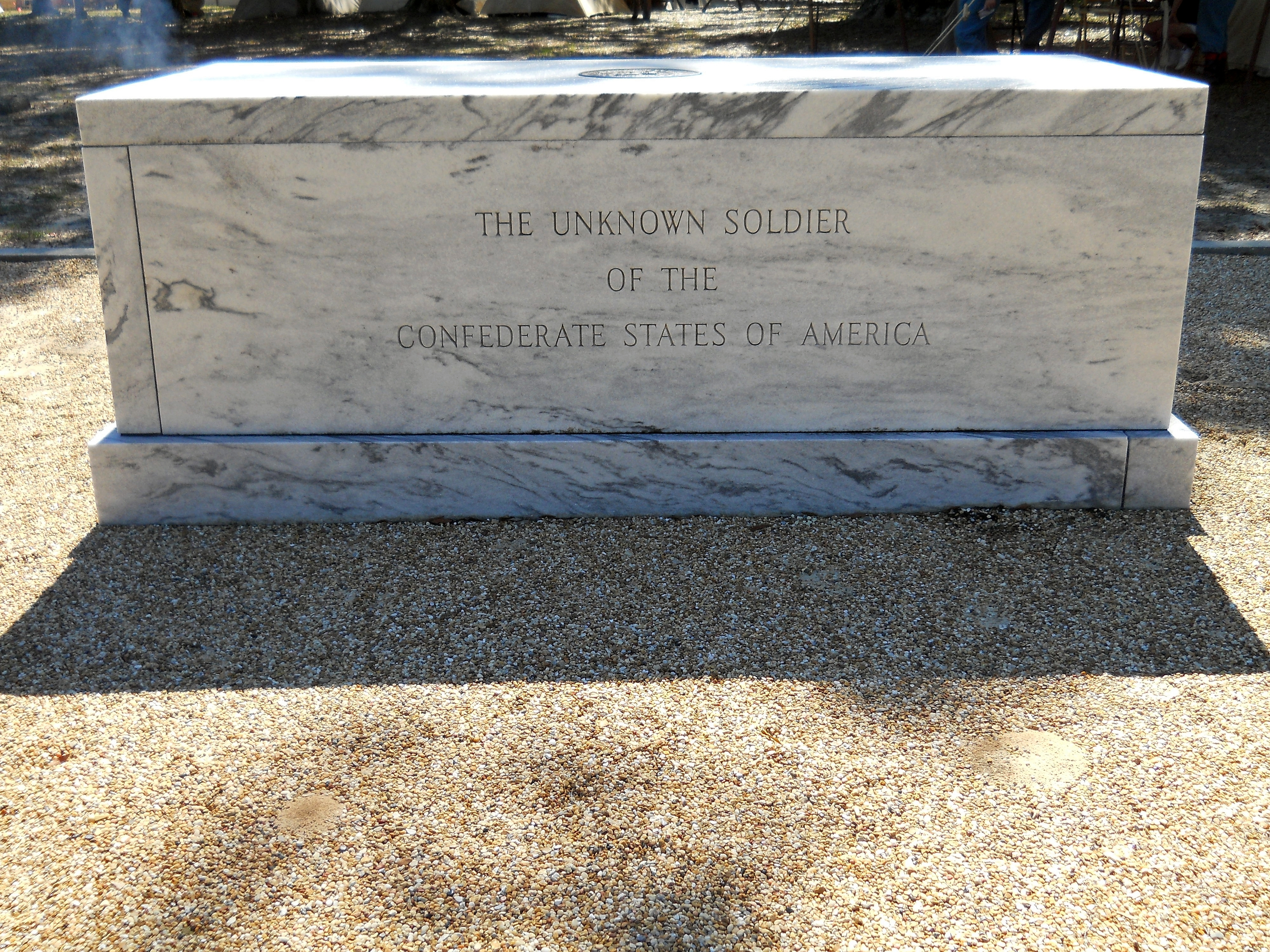
Biloxi

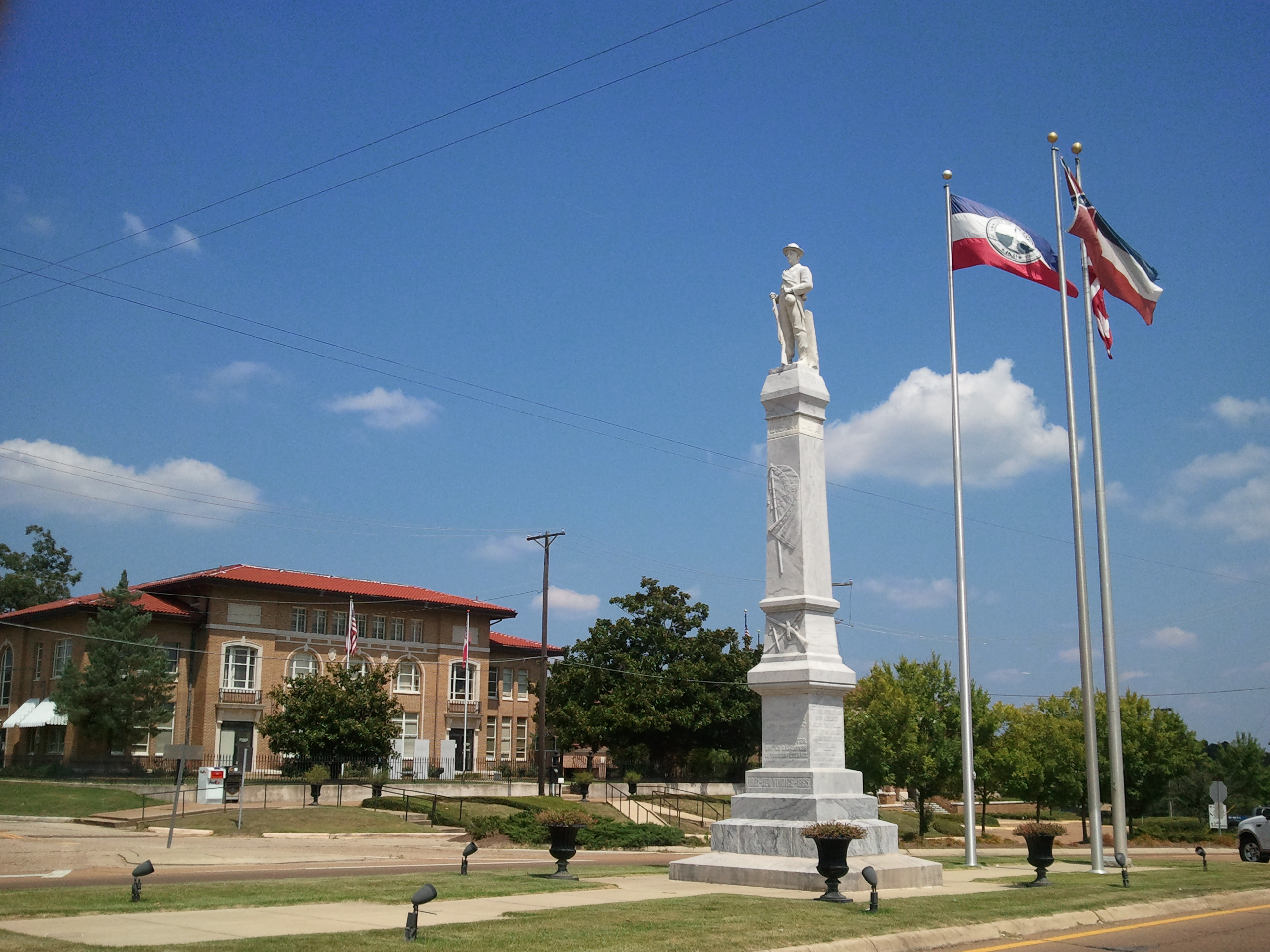
Brandon

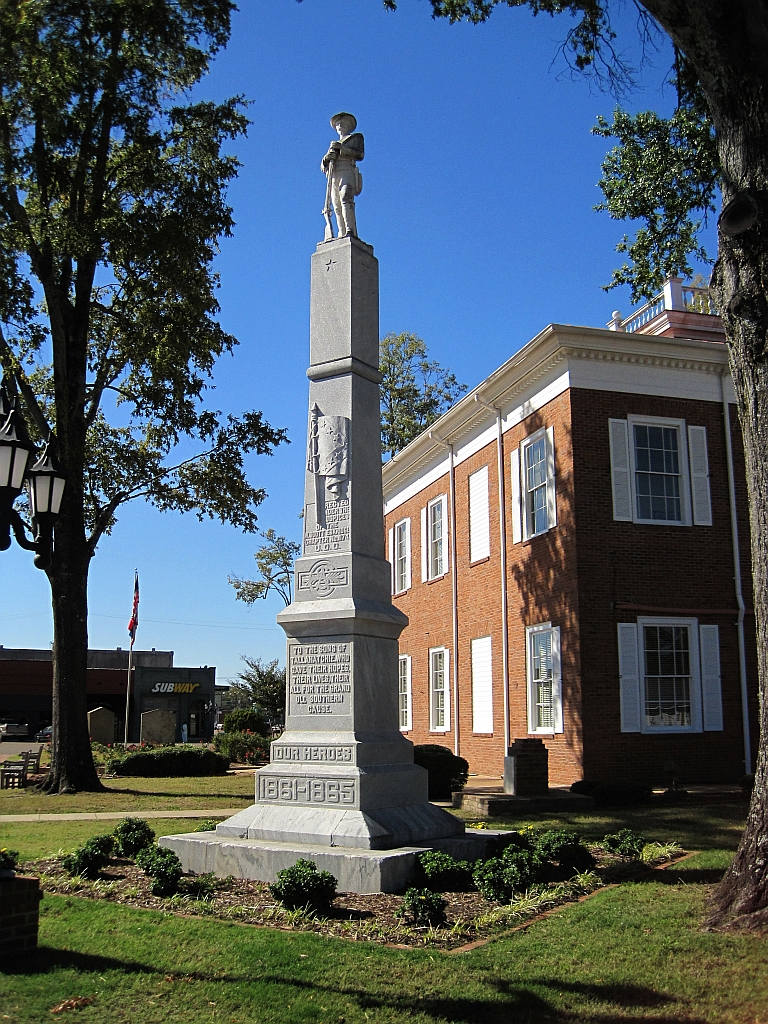
Charleston

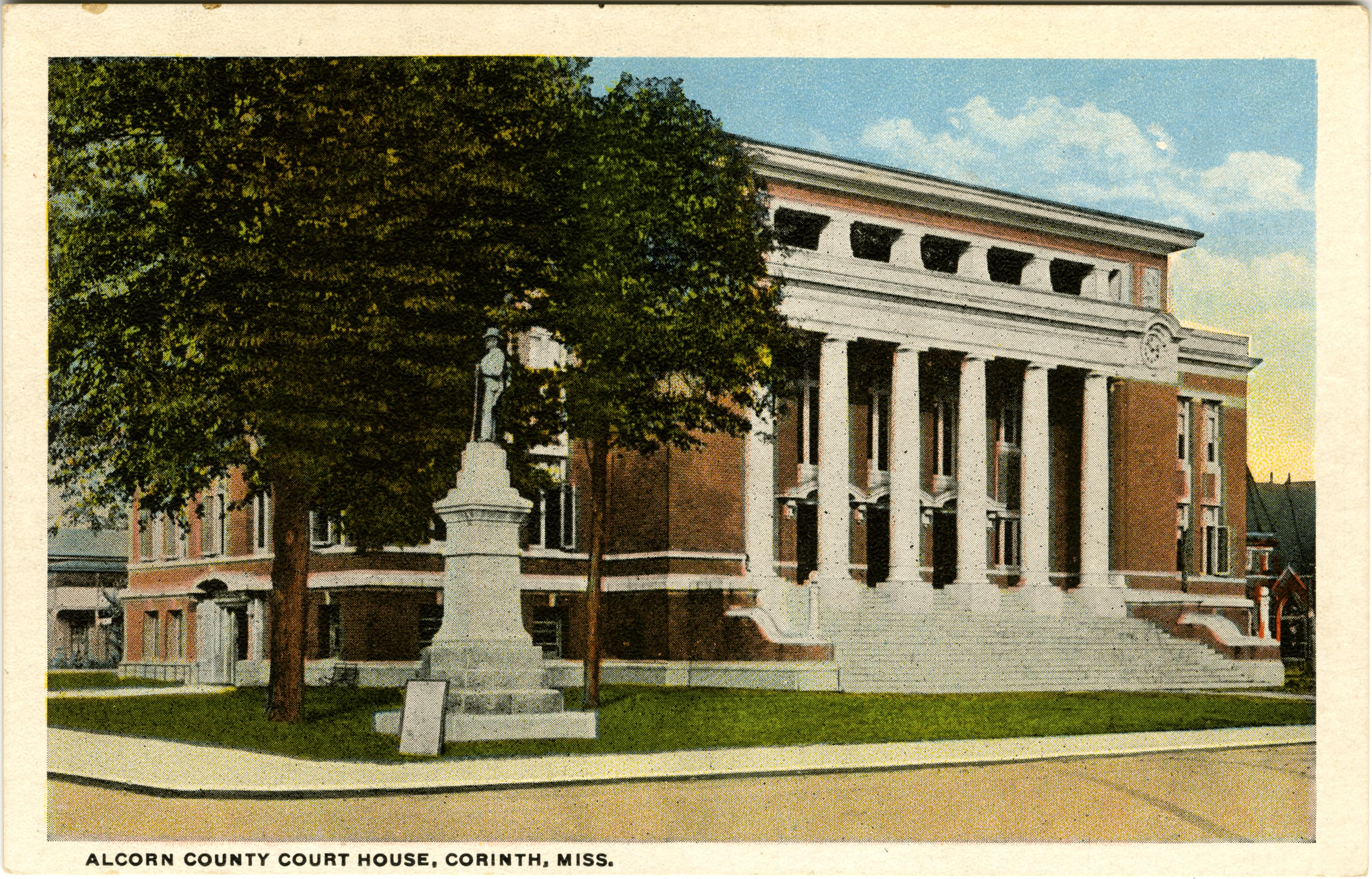
Corinth

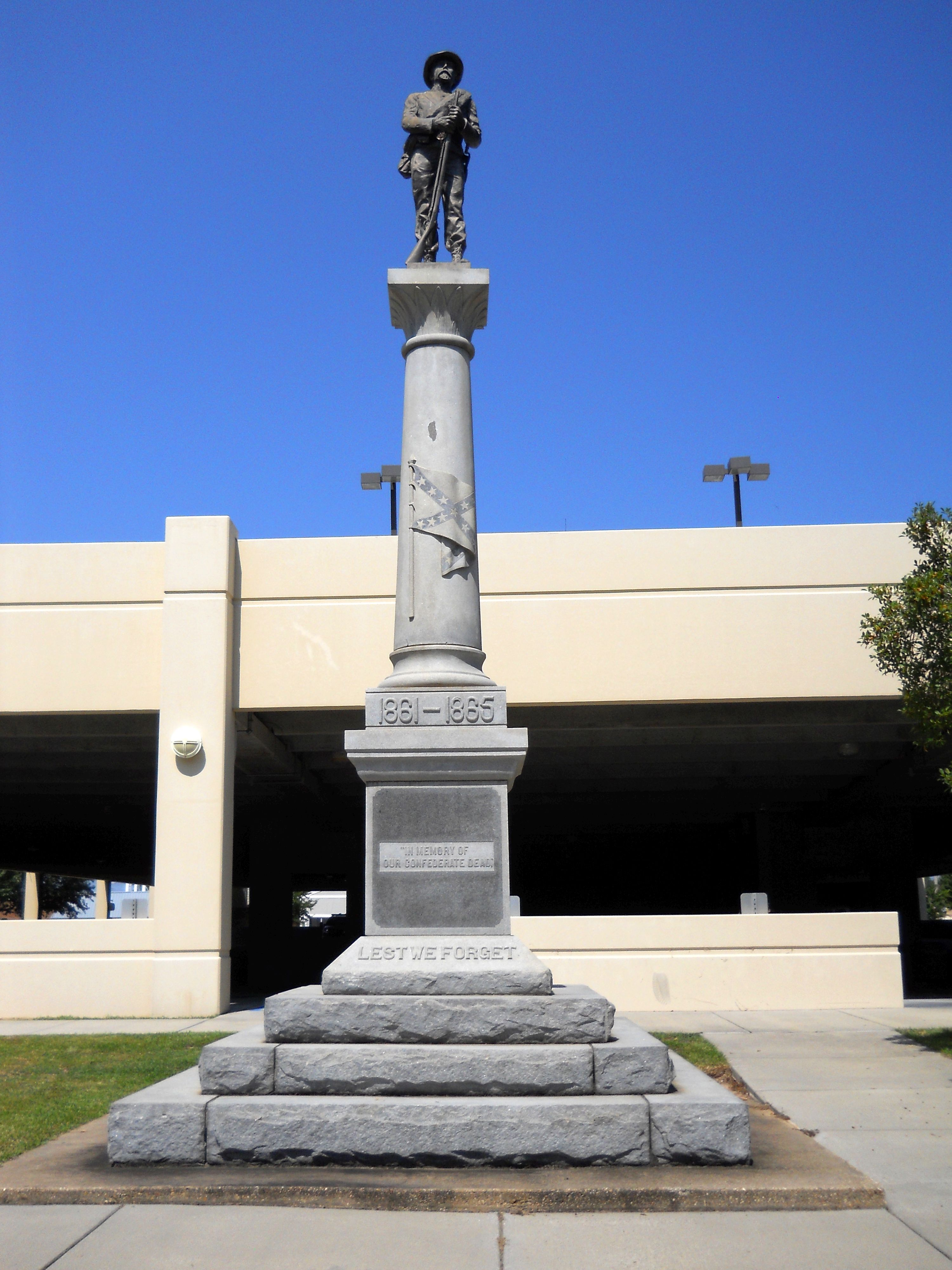
Gulfport

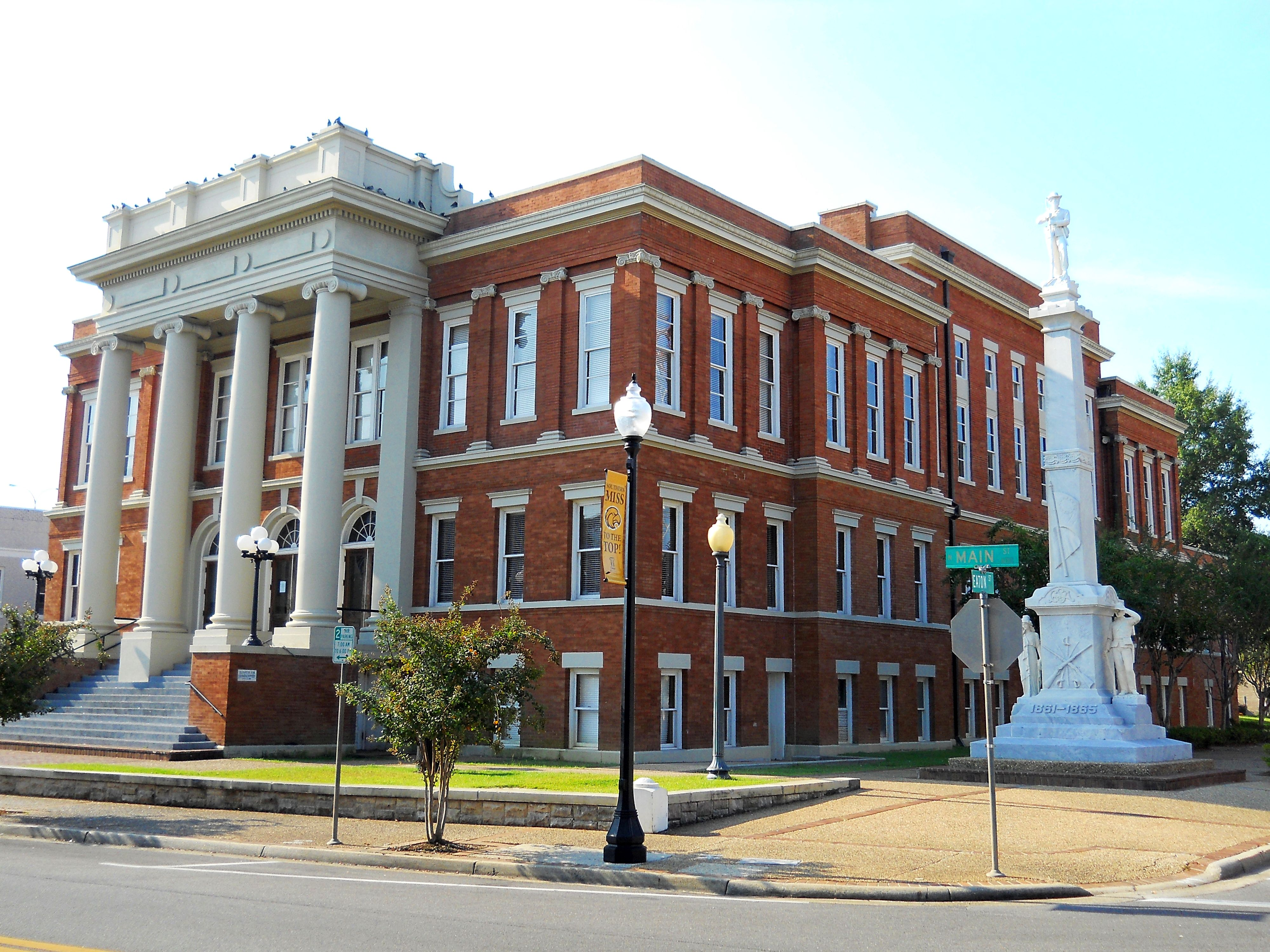
Hattiesburg

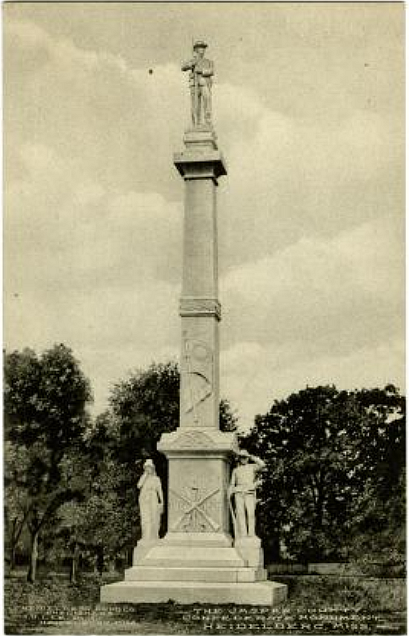
Heidelberg

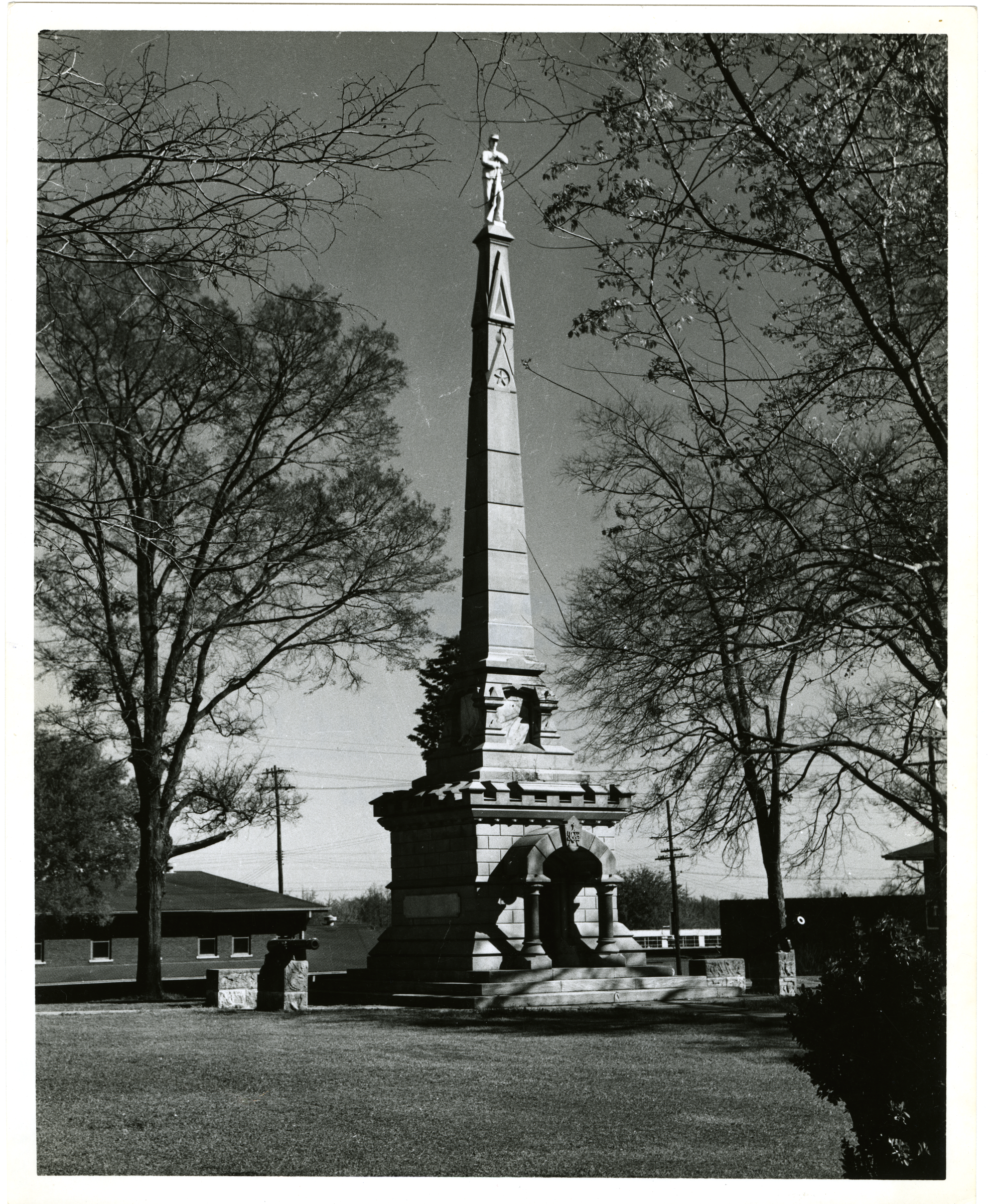
Jackson

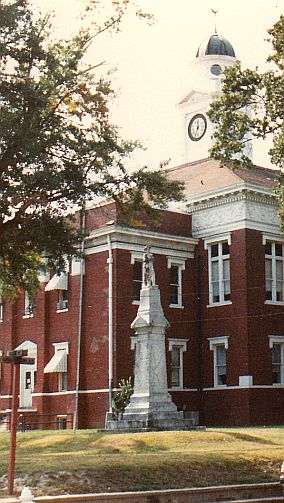
Kosciusko

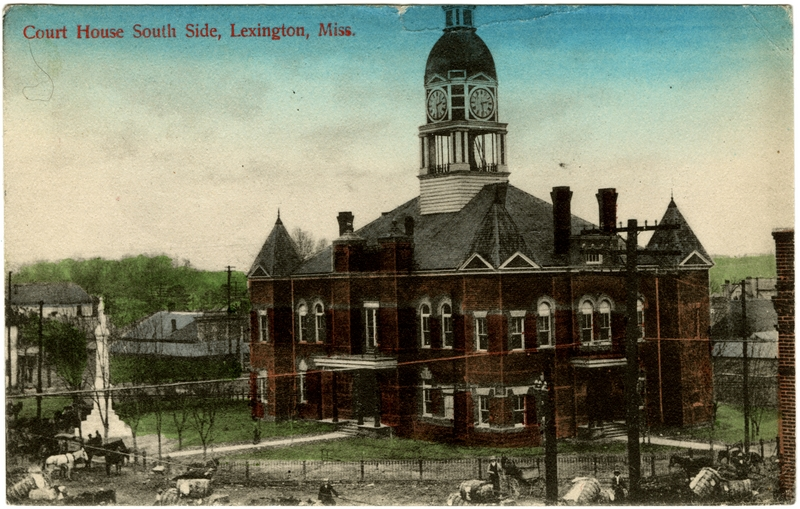
Lexington

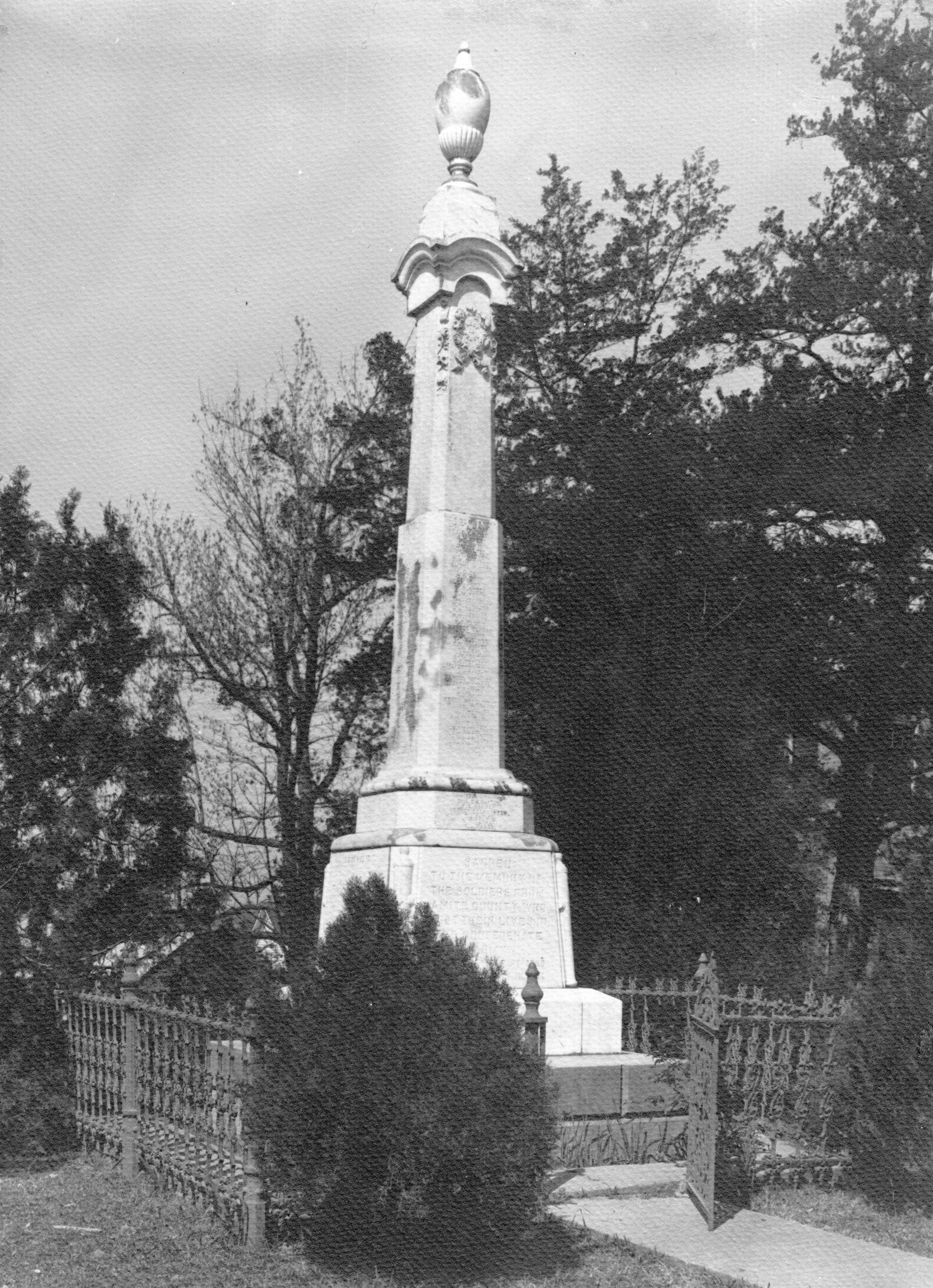
Liberty

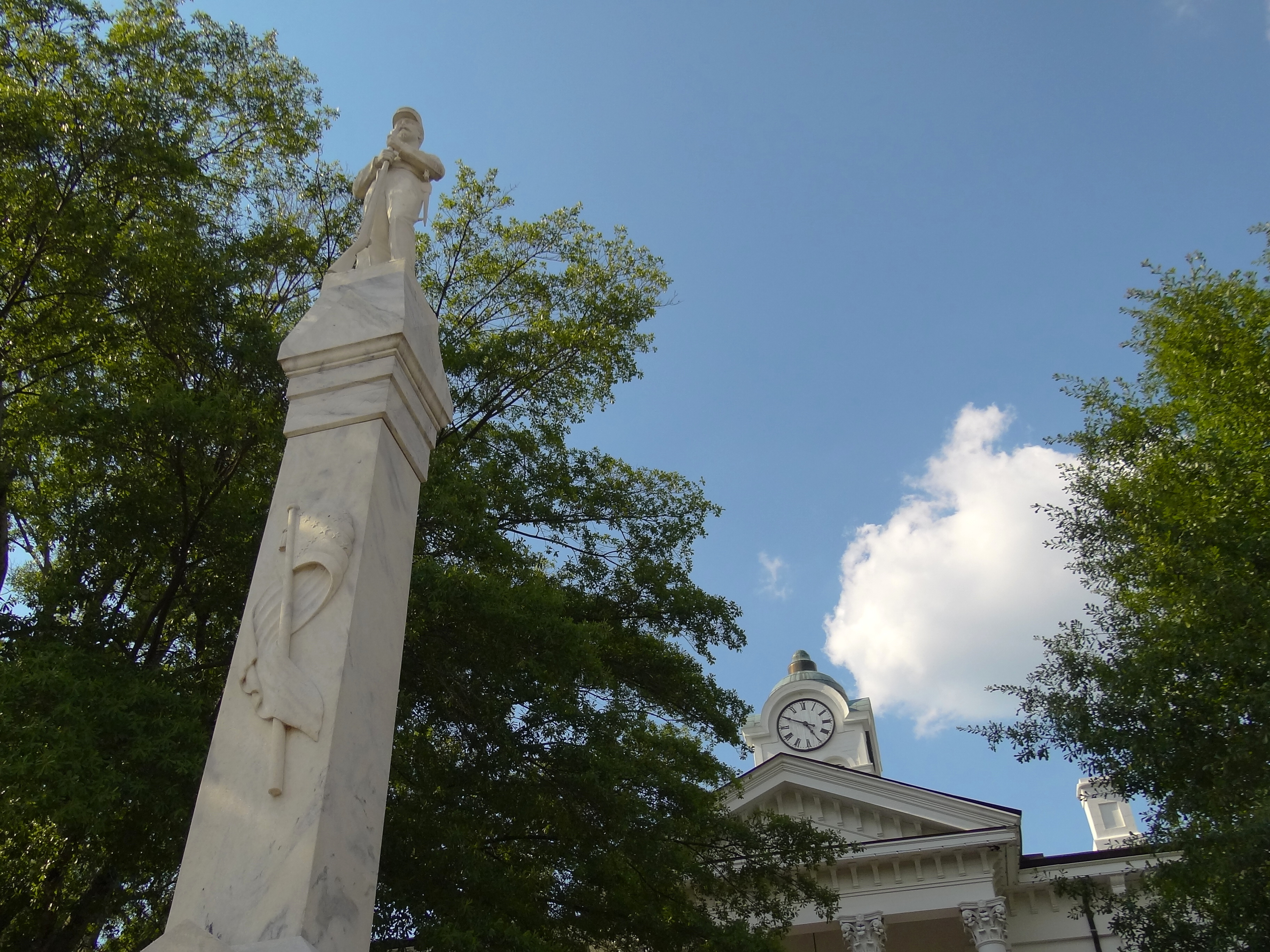
Oxford

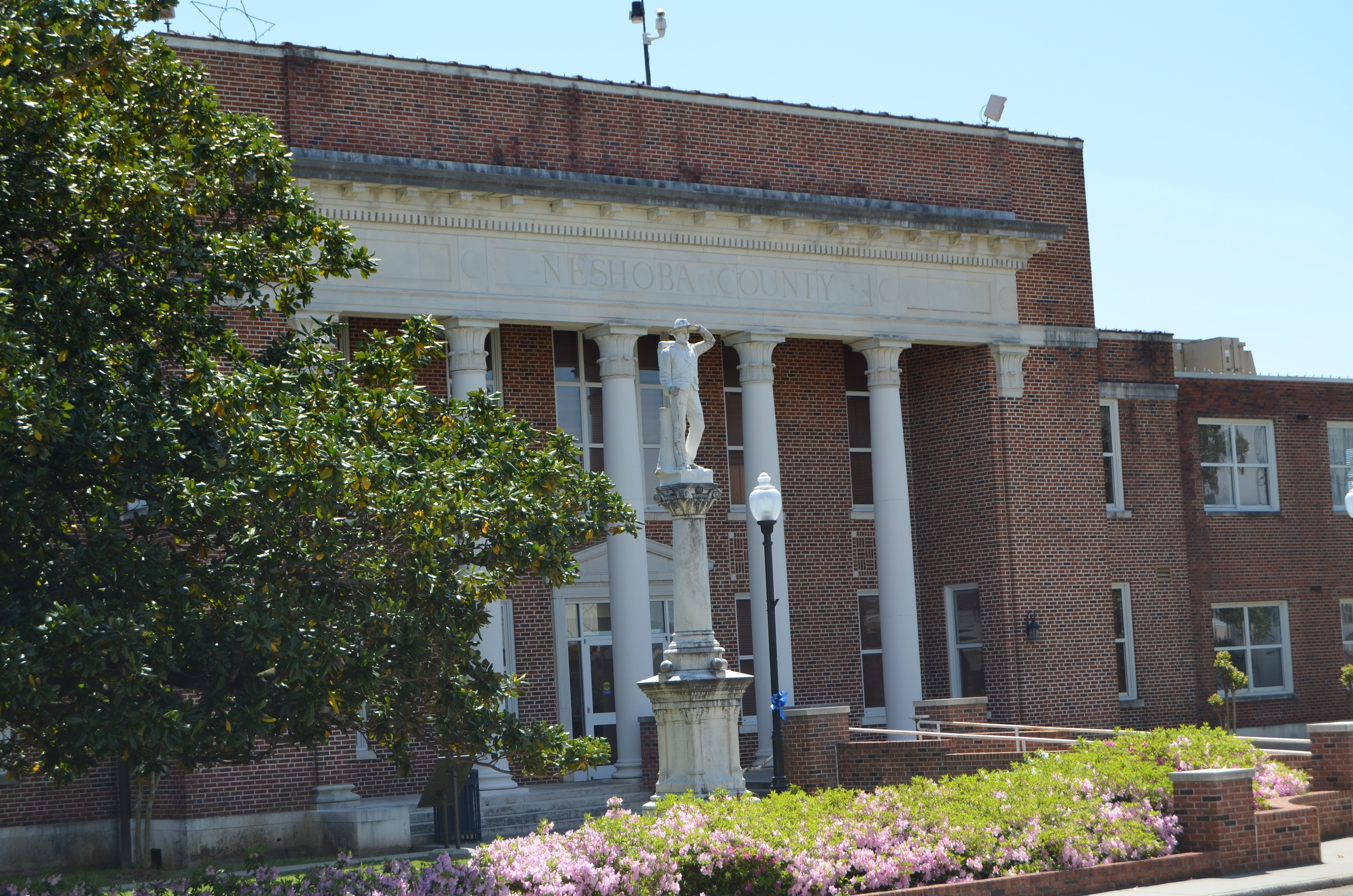
Philadelphia

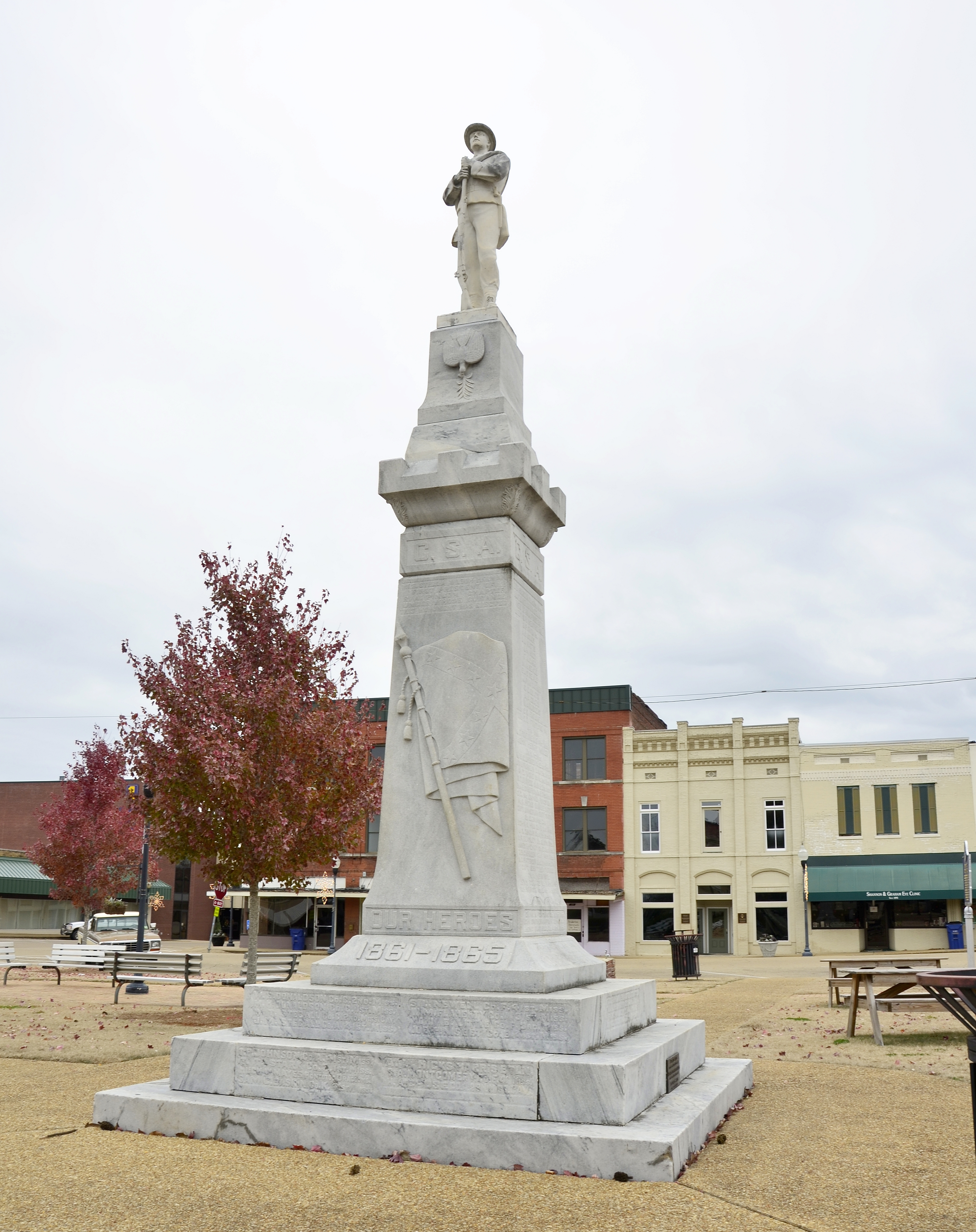
Pontotoc

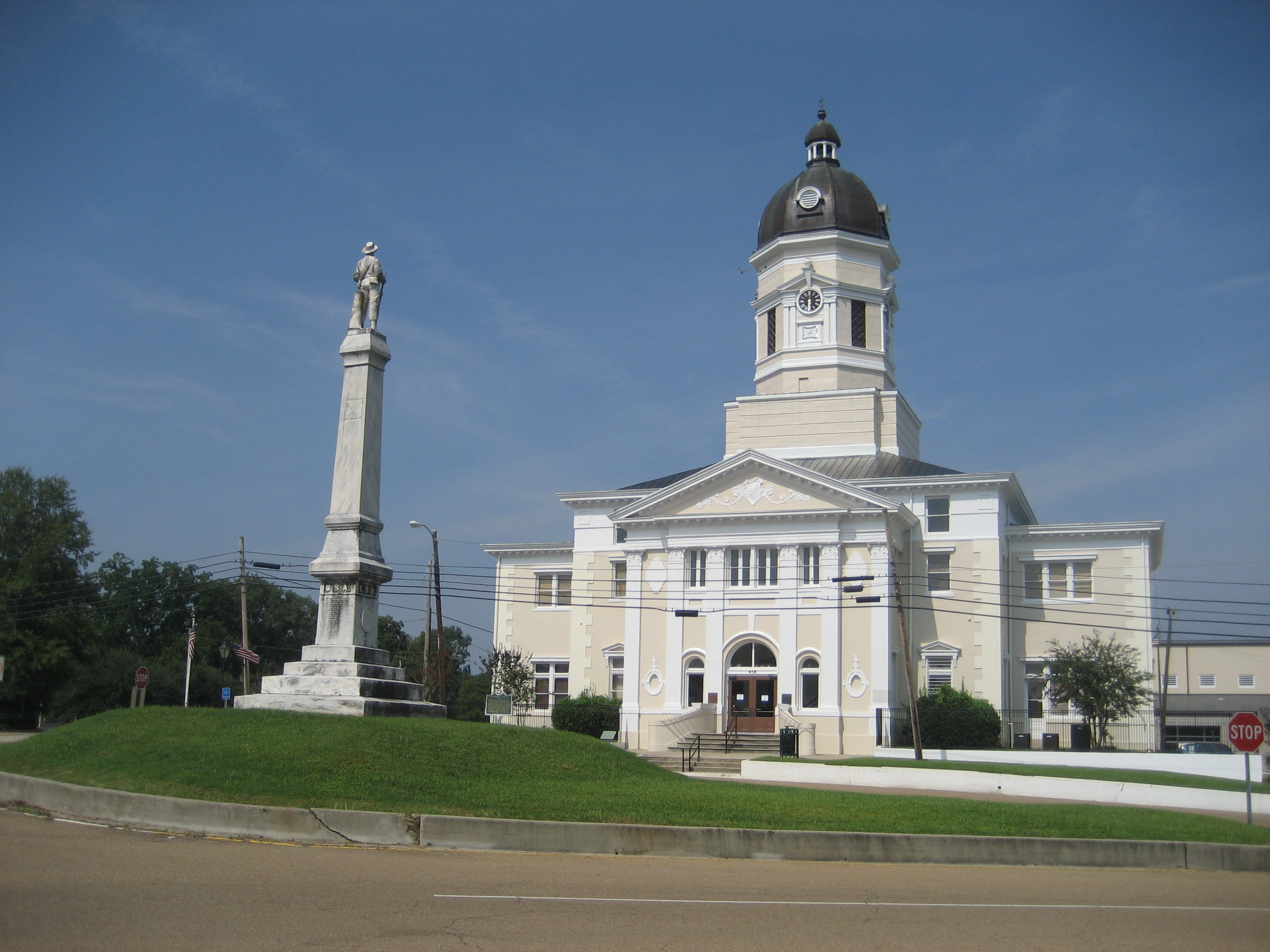
Port Gibson

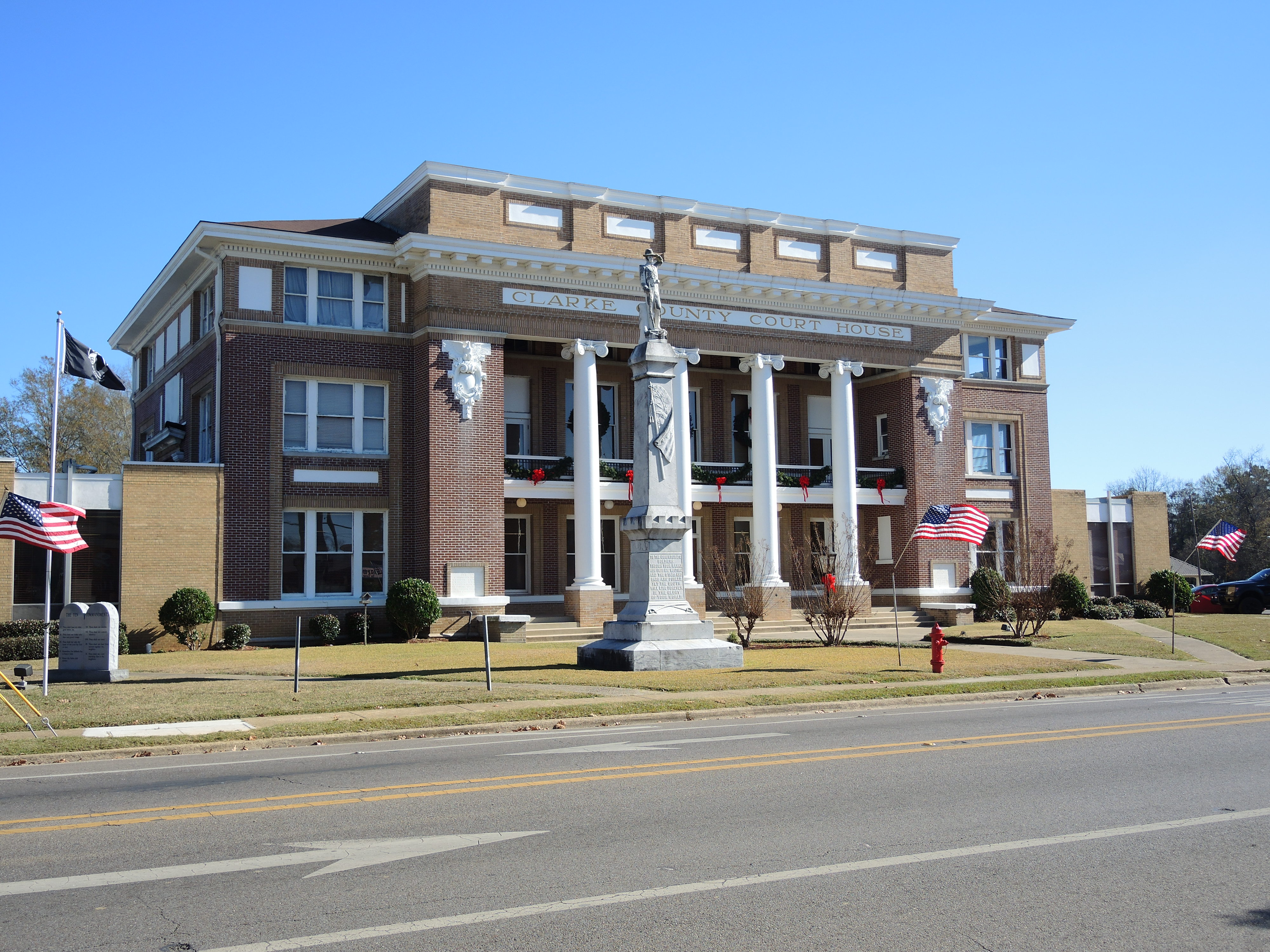
Quitman

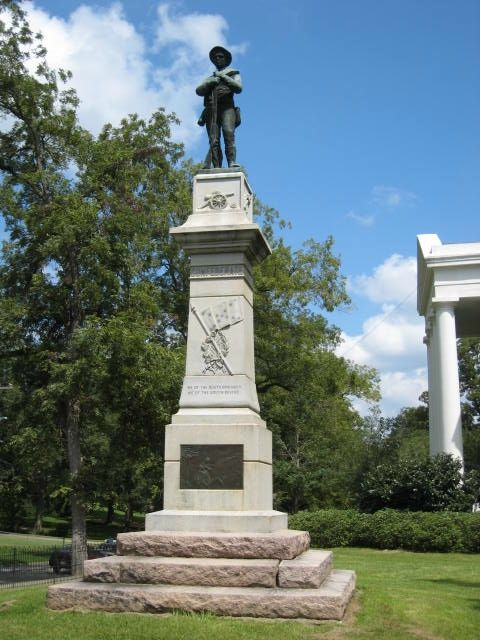
Raymond

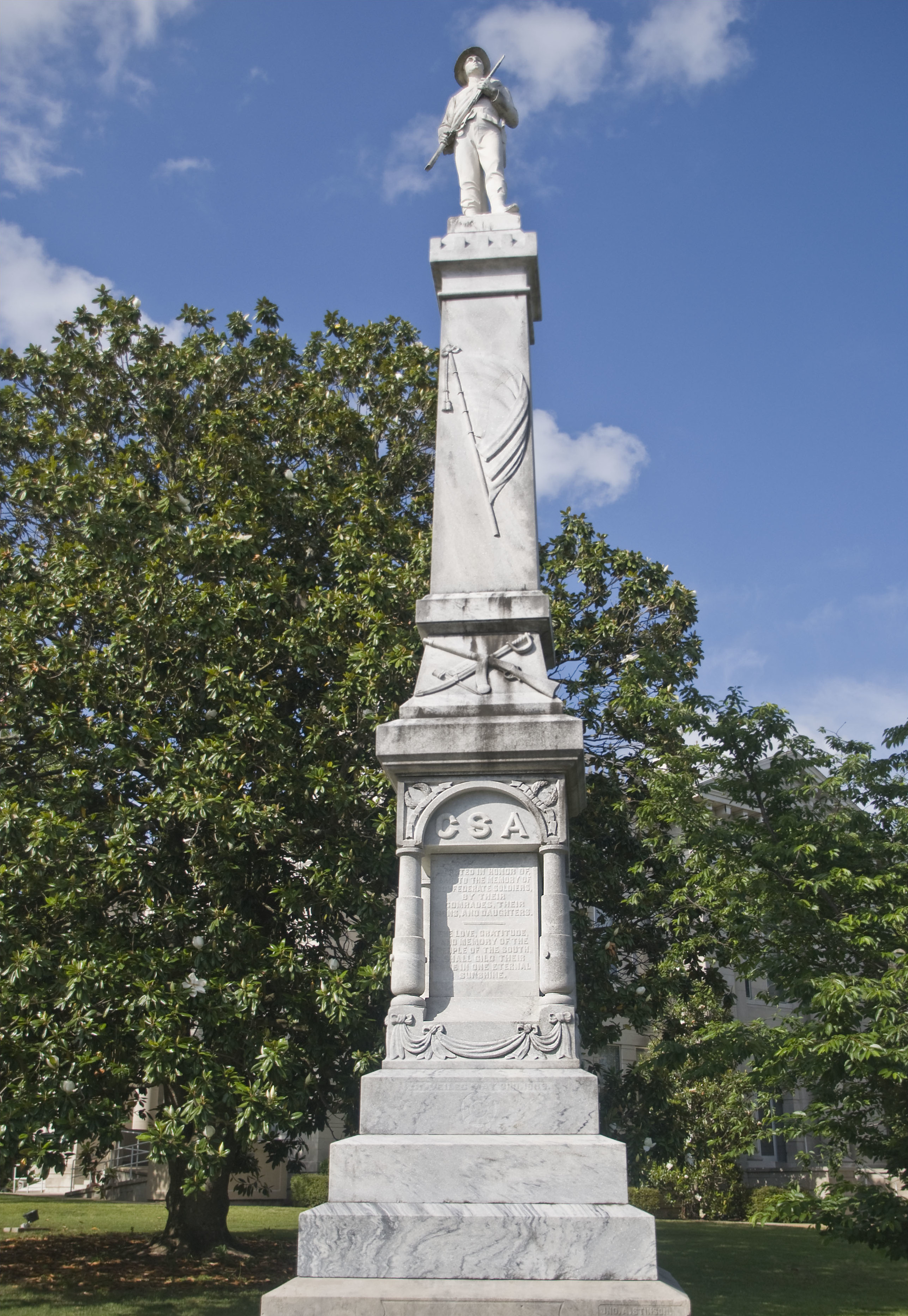
Tupelo

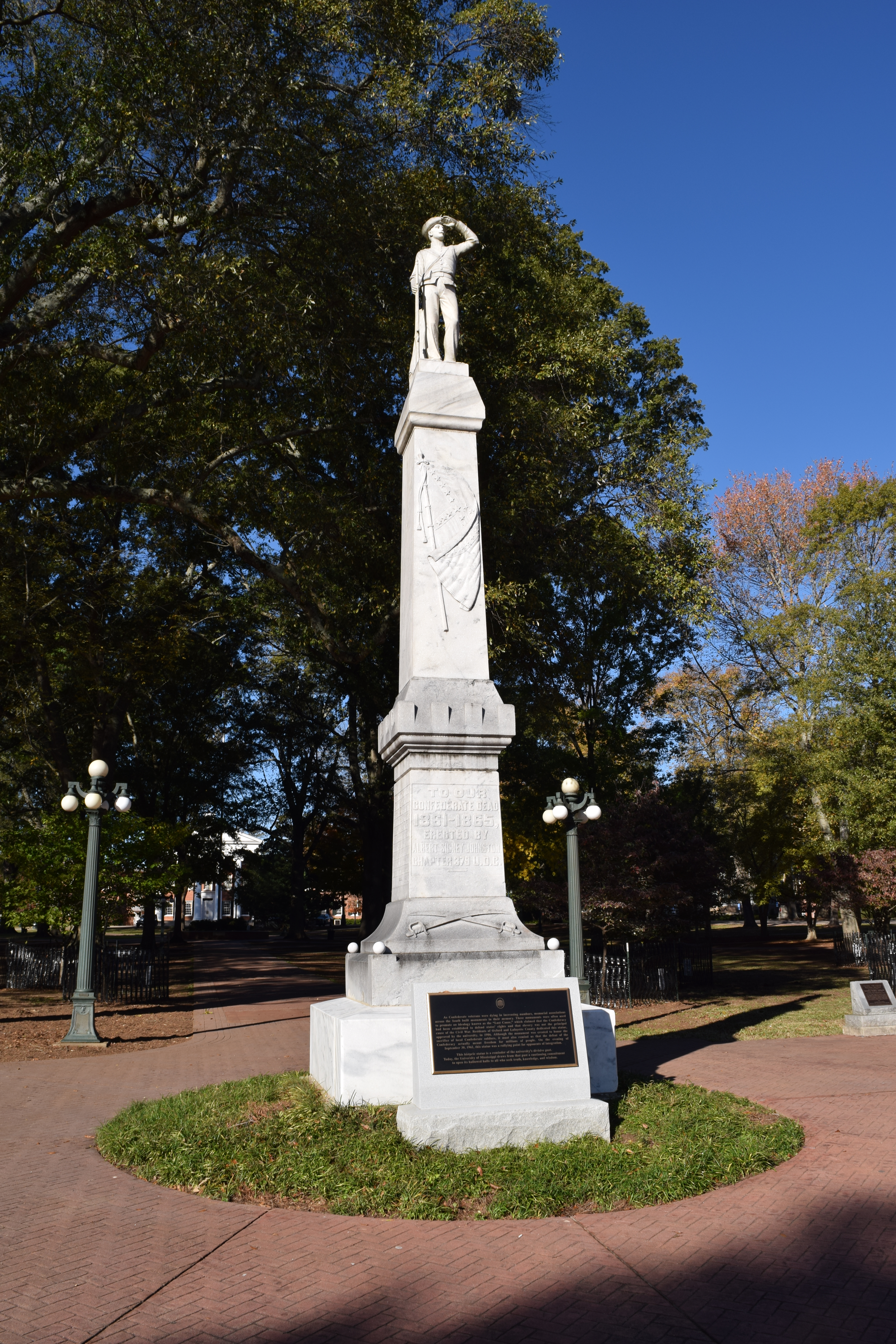
University of Mississippi

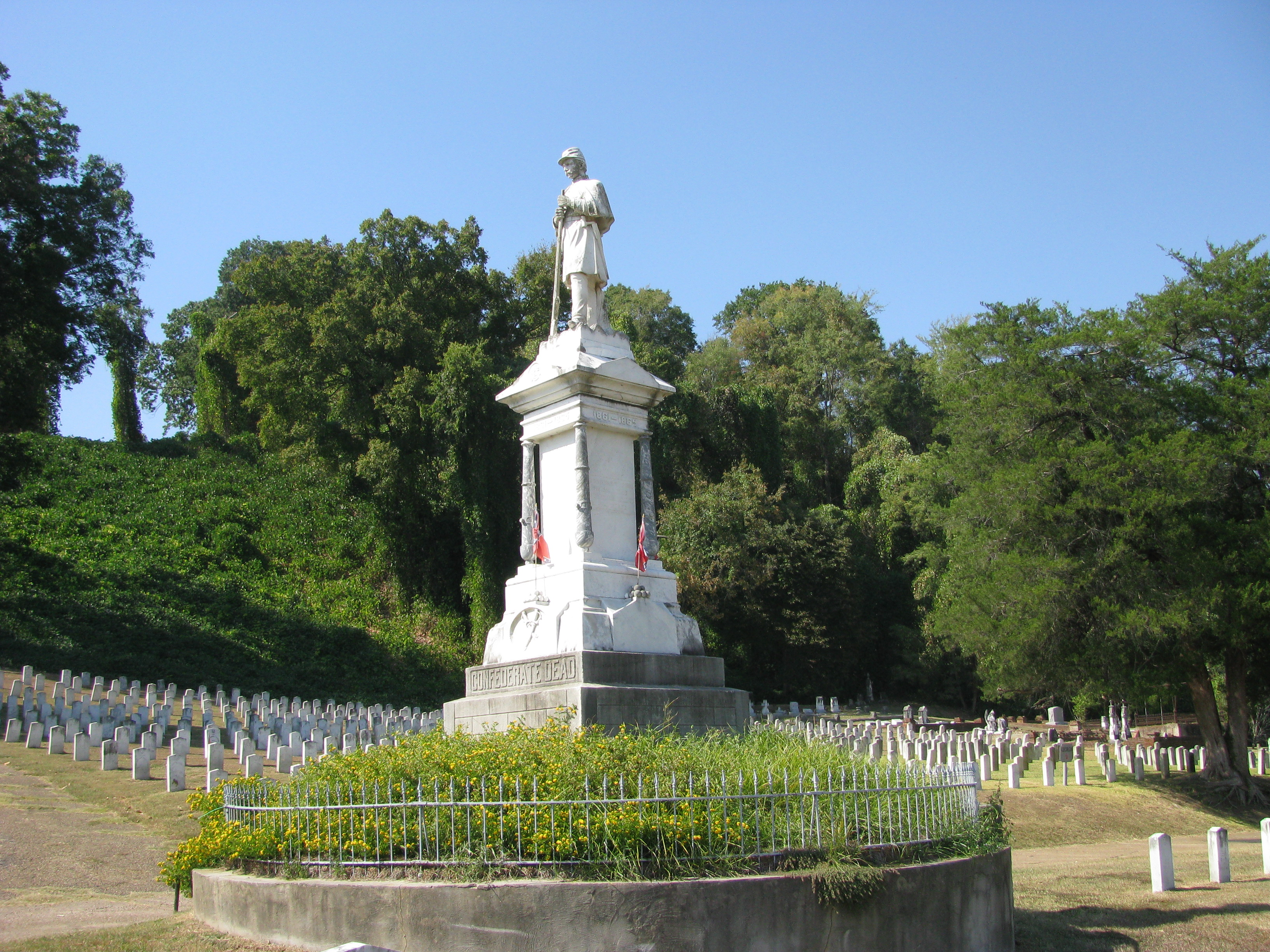
Vicksburg

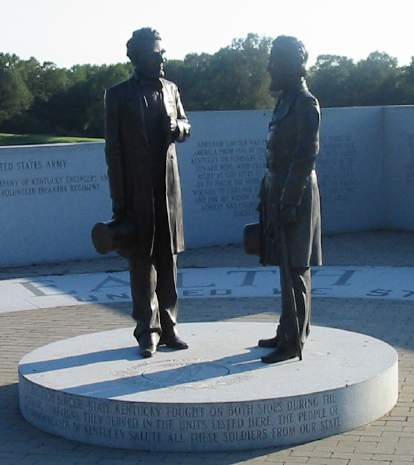
Kentucky Memorial, Vicksburg NMP

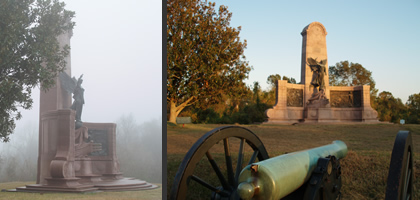
The Missouri Memorial, Vicksburg NMP

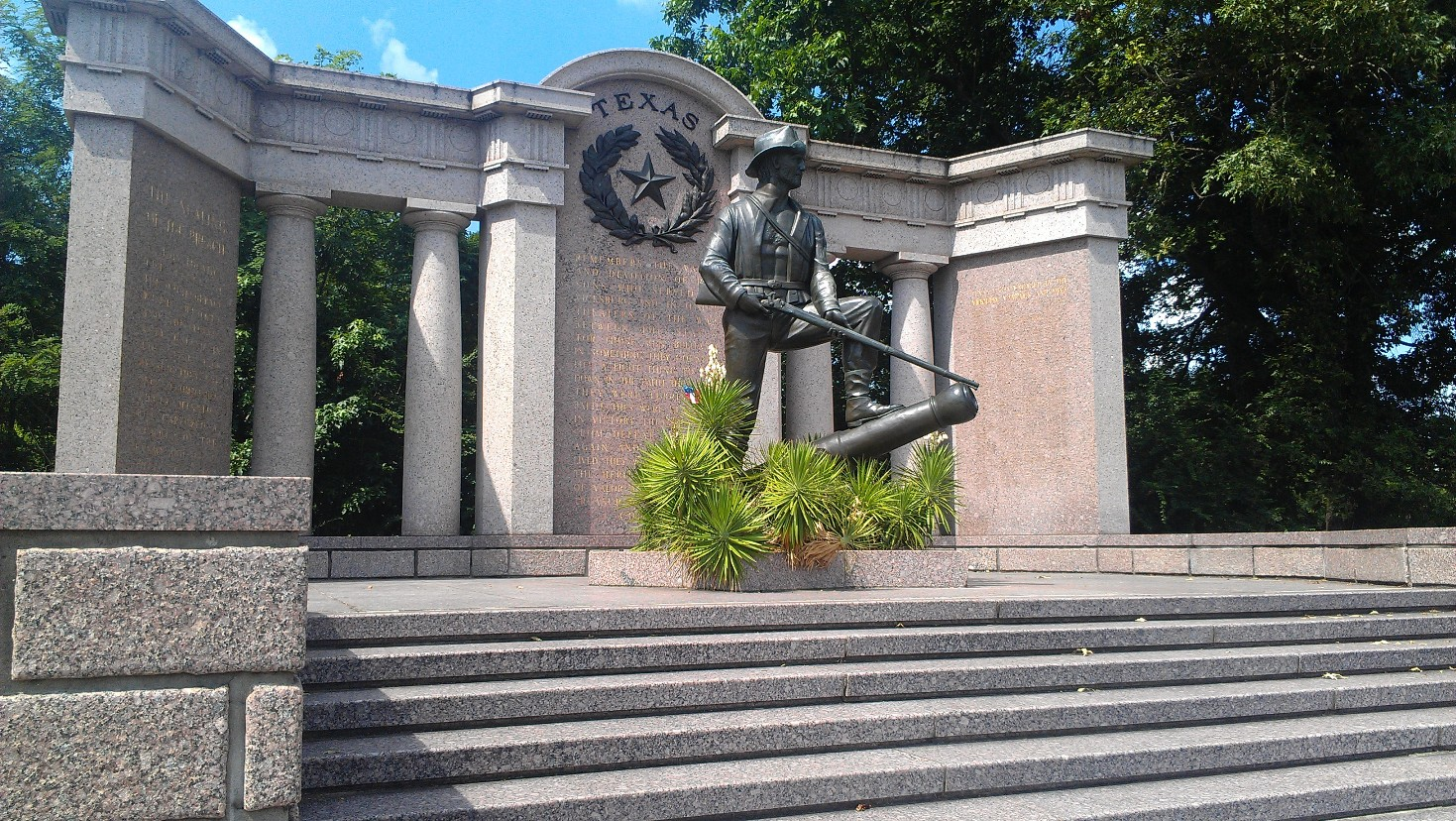
Texas Memorial, Vicksburg NMP

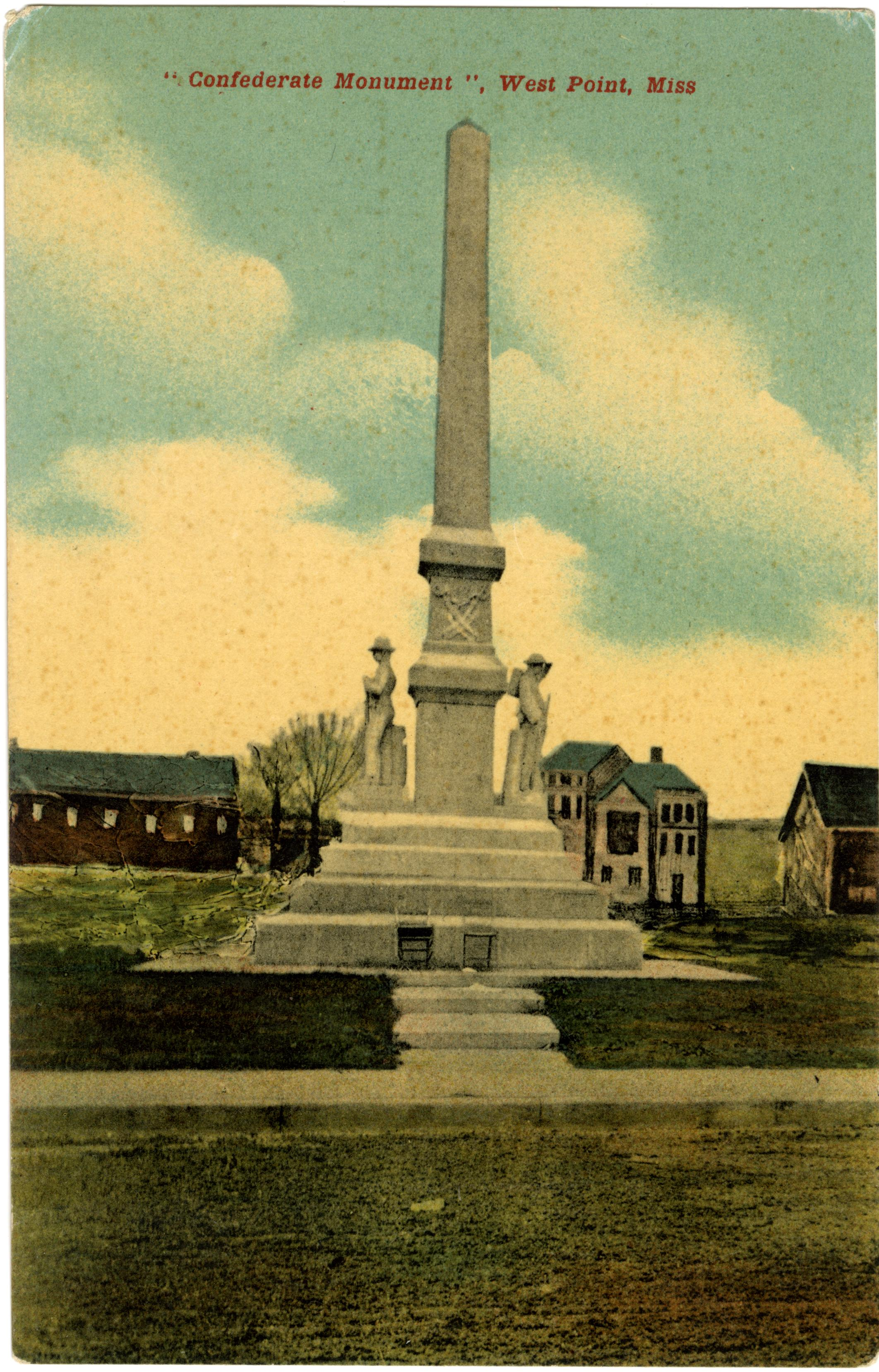
West Point
