= Confederate Monument (Gulfport, Mississippi) =

Coordinates: 30°22′23″N 89°05′26″W

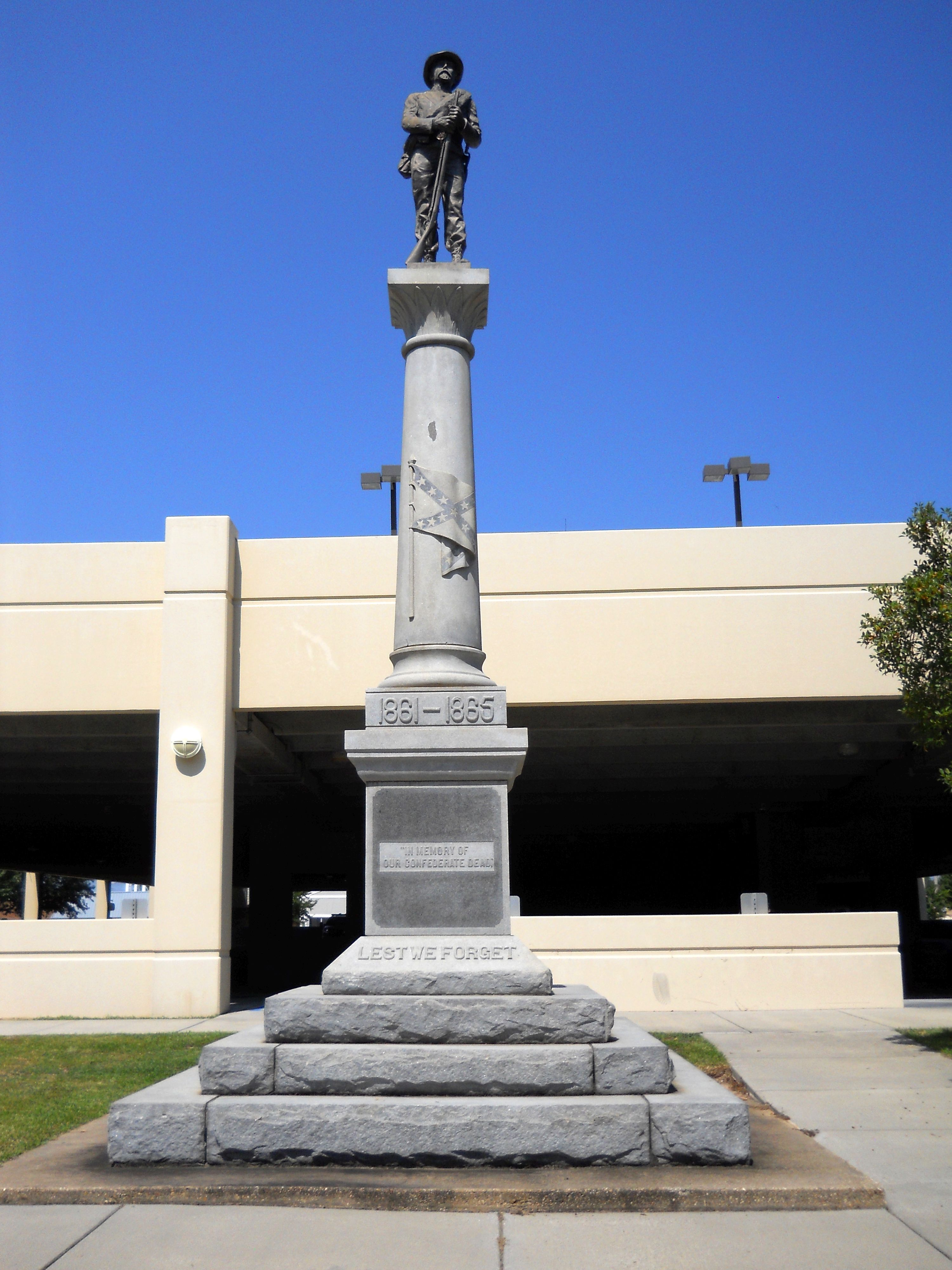
- Confederate Monument (2017)
- Location: Gulfport, Mississippi
- Material: Bronze; Granite
- Height: 25 feet (7.6 m)
- Dedicated date: November 23, 1911
- Dedicated to: The Confederate States of America

The Confederate Monument in Gulfport, Mississippi is a monument dedicated to Confederate soldiers who died in the American Civil War. The statue was dedicated in 1911 and stands on the grounds of the Harrison County Courthouse.

== History ==
The construction of a Confederate monument in Harrison County, Mississippi was led by the local chapter of the United Daughters of the Confederacy (UDC), who were active in the erection of Confederate monuments and memorials during the period between Reconstruction era and the start of World War I. The monument erected in Gulfport, the county seat of Harrison County, is similar to many erected during this time. Plans for the monument were finalized in September 1911, with the local UDC chapter raising $1,500 and the Harrison County Board of supervisors providing an additional $1,000 of funding towards the monument's construction. Total cost for the monument's construction reached $3,500, with additional funding coming from nearby UDC chapters. While some had proposed that the monument be erected in front of the town's Federal building, a sewer line at this location prevented that, and the monument was instead to be erected in front of the Harrison County Courthouse.

While the UDC initially planned for a grand unveiling of the monument of October 12, 1911, shipping delays caused the official dedication of the monument to occur on November 23, Thanksgiving Day. Several years later, the original courthouse was demolished, with a new one built at a different location. The monument was moved to the grounds of the new courthouse following this.

In recent years, as part of ongoing removal of Confederate monuments and memorials, there have been similar calls made for the Gulfport monument. In mid-December 2020, the Harrison County Board of Supervisors voted on retaining or removing the Confederate statue from the courthouse grounds. The vote was a 2-2 spilt with one supervisor absent. With no majority decision, the statue will remain in place.

== Design ==
The monument, standing 25 feet (7.6 m), features a bronze statue of a Confederate soldier standing at parade rest atop a granite shaft and base. An unfurled Confederate battle flag is inscribed on the front of the shaft. On the base are multiple inscriptions, including "In Memory of Our Confederate Dead", "Lest We Forget", and the years "1861–1865".

== See also ==
- 1911 in art
- List of Confederate monuments and memorials in Mississippi
