= Amory's Tribute to the Heroes of 1861–1865 =

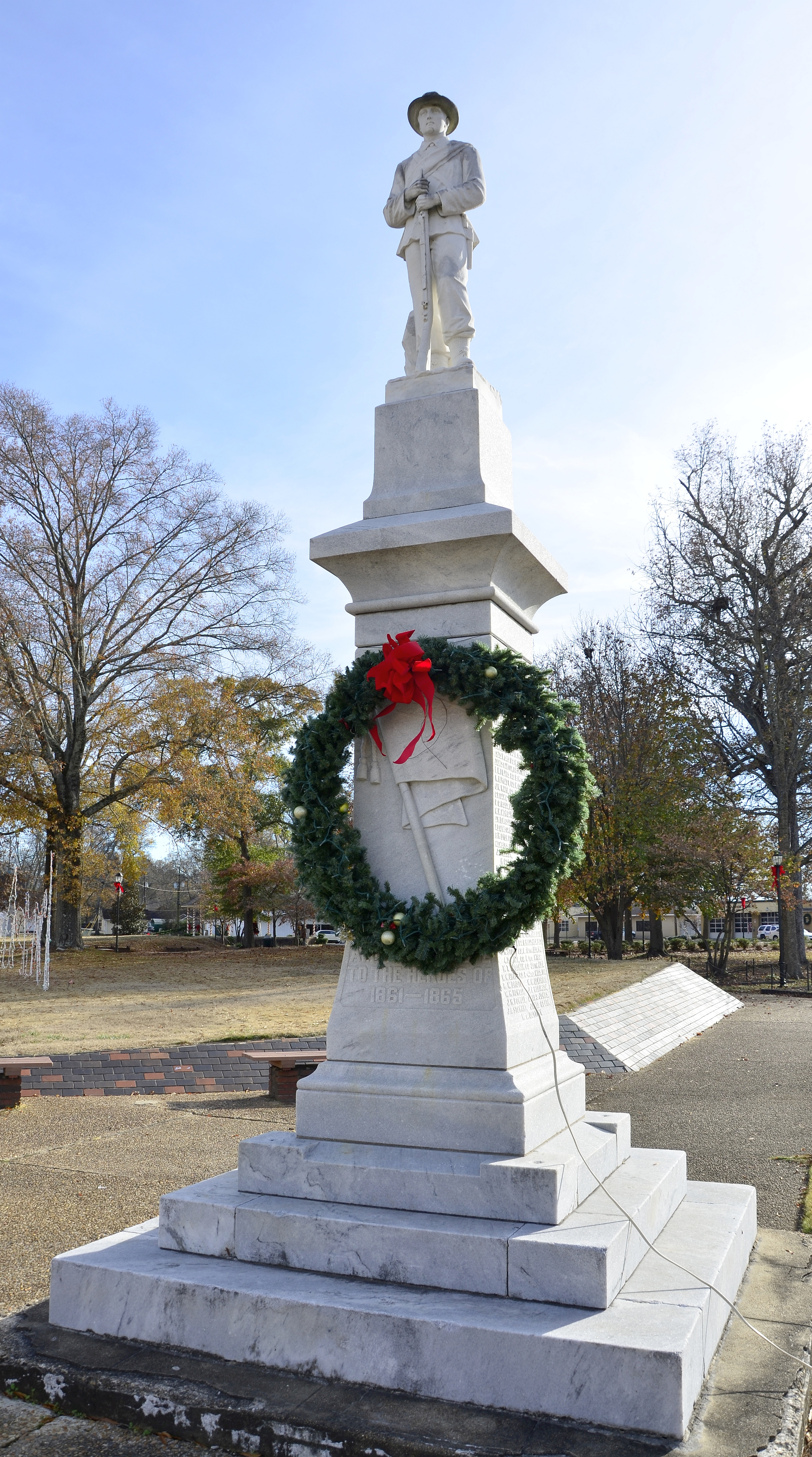
- Amory's Tribute to the Heroes of 1861–1865, with a wreath (2014)
- Interactive map of Amory's Tribute to the Heroes of 1861–1865
- Location: Amory, Mississippi
- Coordinates: 33°59.101′N 88°29.353′W
- Dedicated date: 1924
- Dedicated to: The Confederate States of America

Amory's Tribute to the Heroes of 1861–1865 is a Confederate monument in Amory, Mississippi. It was erected in 1924 by the local chapter of the United Daughters of the Confederacy.

== History ==
Amory was a planned railroad town that was founded in 1887, after the American Civil War had ended. Usually, towns that were founded in the former Confederate States of America after the war did not put up Confederate war memorials. The idea of a war memorial being built in the new town came about from Confederate veterans residing in the town that had served under General Stonewall Jackson and camped nearby. The monument was erected in 1924 at a cost of $2,500 by the local chapter of the United Daughters of the Confederacy, during a time when many similar Confederate monuments were being erected throughout the Southern United States, and was dedicated in 1931. It was unveiled in the presence of Confederate veterans. The statue was originally located at the intersection of Main Street and First Avenue, but in either 1939 or 1945 (sources differ), the monument was relocated to Frisco Park in downtown Amory.

The monument is made of marble and comprises a Confederate Army private standing atop a base. The sides of the base lists the names of 53 veteran of Jackson's camp. The front has an unfurled Confederate battle flag and states "Amory's Tribute to the Heroes of 1861–1865." The back contains a quote from President of the Confederate States of America, Jefferson Davis, paying tribute to Confederate women.

== See also ==
- 1924 in art
- List of Confederate monuments and memorials in Mississippi
