= Liberty Presbyterian Church =

Historic church in Mississippi, United States

- U.S. National Register of Historic Places
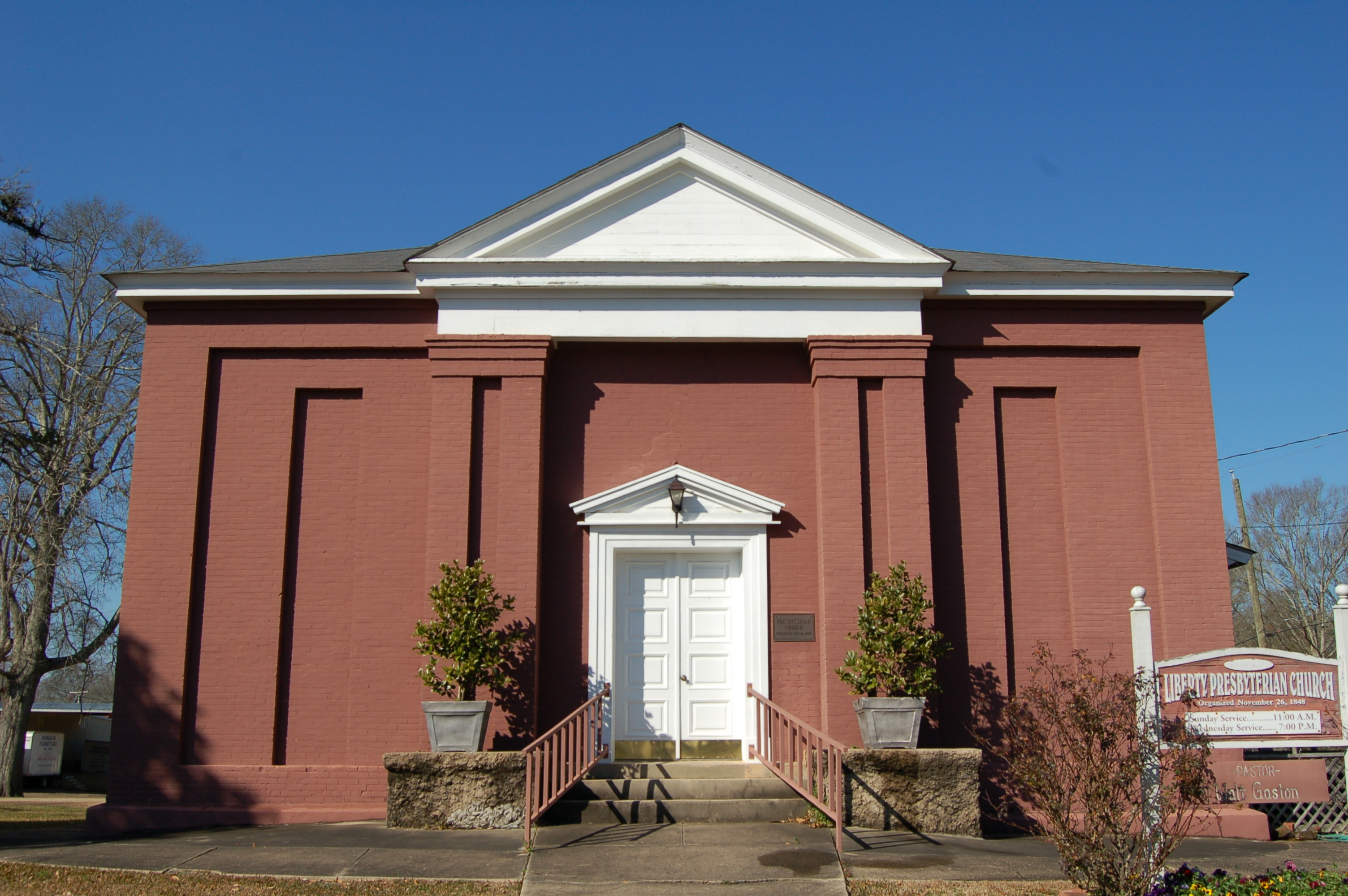

- Location within Mississippi Location within the United States
- Location: North Church Street, Liberty, Mississippi, U.S.
- Coordinates: 31°9′32″N 90°48′33″W
- Area: 0.2 acres (0.081 ha)
- Built: 1850
- Architectural style: Greek Revival
- NRHP reference No.: 85001075
- Added to NRHP: May 16, 1985

Liberty Presbyterian Church is a historic church building on North Church Street in Liberty, Mississippi. It was built in 1850, and added to the National Register of Historic Places in 1985.

The pastor of this Presbyterian church is Rev. Walt Gaston. The church building is located next door to a Confederate monument.
