= Confederate Monument (Liberty, Mississippi) =

Monument in Liberty, Mississippi, United States

Coordinates: 31°09′31″N 90°48′33″W

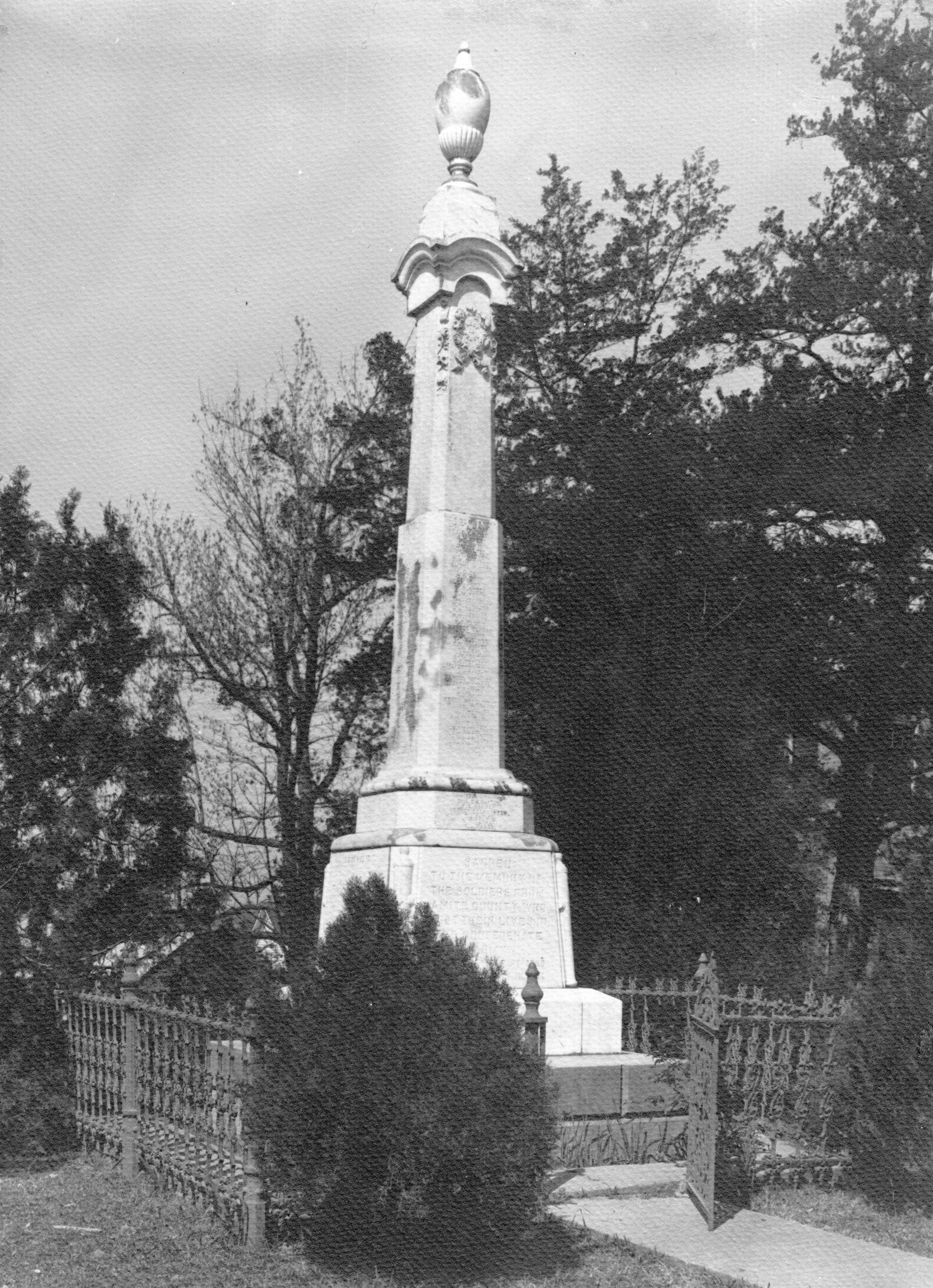
- Works Progress Administration picture of the monument, c. 1936–1941
- Location: Liberty, Mississippi
- Designer: A. J. Lewis
- Material: Italian marble (shaft); Granite and brick (base)
- Height: 21.5 ft (6.6 m)
- Dedicated date: April 26, 1871
- Dedicated to: Confederate soldiers from Amite County, Mississippi who died in the American Civil War

The Confederate Monument in Liberty, Mississippi, United States is a monument dedicated to Confederate soldiers from Amite County, Mississippi who died in the American Civil War. Dedicated in 1871, it is the first Confederate monument to be erected in Mississippi and one of the earliest such monuments in the United States. In 1988, it was designated a Mississippi Landmark.

== History ==
The cornerstone for the monument was laid in 1866 at a small park area near Liberty Presbyterian Church in downtown Liberty, Mississippi. The land would be donated by the Liberty Lodge of Masons in 1868. The Amite County Monument and Historical Association had been formed in 1866 and proceeded to raise over $3,300 over the next five years for the creation of a monument dedicated to dead Confederate soldiers from Amite County, Mississippi. The association hired A. J. Lewis of Brookhaven, Mississippi to design the monument, which was completed in March 1871. The monument had been built in New Orleans and shipped to Liberty, being transported by oxen for the last 30 miles to the town. The monument was officially dedicated the following month on April 26. The monument is notable for being the first Confederate monument in Mississippi, as well as one of the first in the United States.

On December 15, 1988, the Mississippi Department of Archives and History (MDAH) designated the monument a Mississippi Landmark. It was recorded on February 6 of the following year. In 2002, the MDAH erected a historical marker near the monument.

== Design ==
The structure consists of a 20 feet (6.1 m) shaft of Italian marble resting on a 7 square foot base of granite resting on a 9 square foot brick base. The structure stands over 21.5 feet (6.6 m) high. At the top of the monument is a star and a Greek urn. Inscriptions on the monument read,

SACRED TO THE MEMORY OF THE SOLDIERS FROM AMITE COUNTY WHO LOST THEIR LIVES IN THE CONFEDERATE ARMY. ERECTED BY THE CITIZENS OF AMITE COUNTY IN 1871.

Additionally, the names of 279 dead Confederate soldiers from Amite County are inscribed on the shaft of the monument.

== See also ==
- 1871 in art
