= Confederate Monument (Jackson, Mississippi) =

- U.S. Historic district – Contributing property
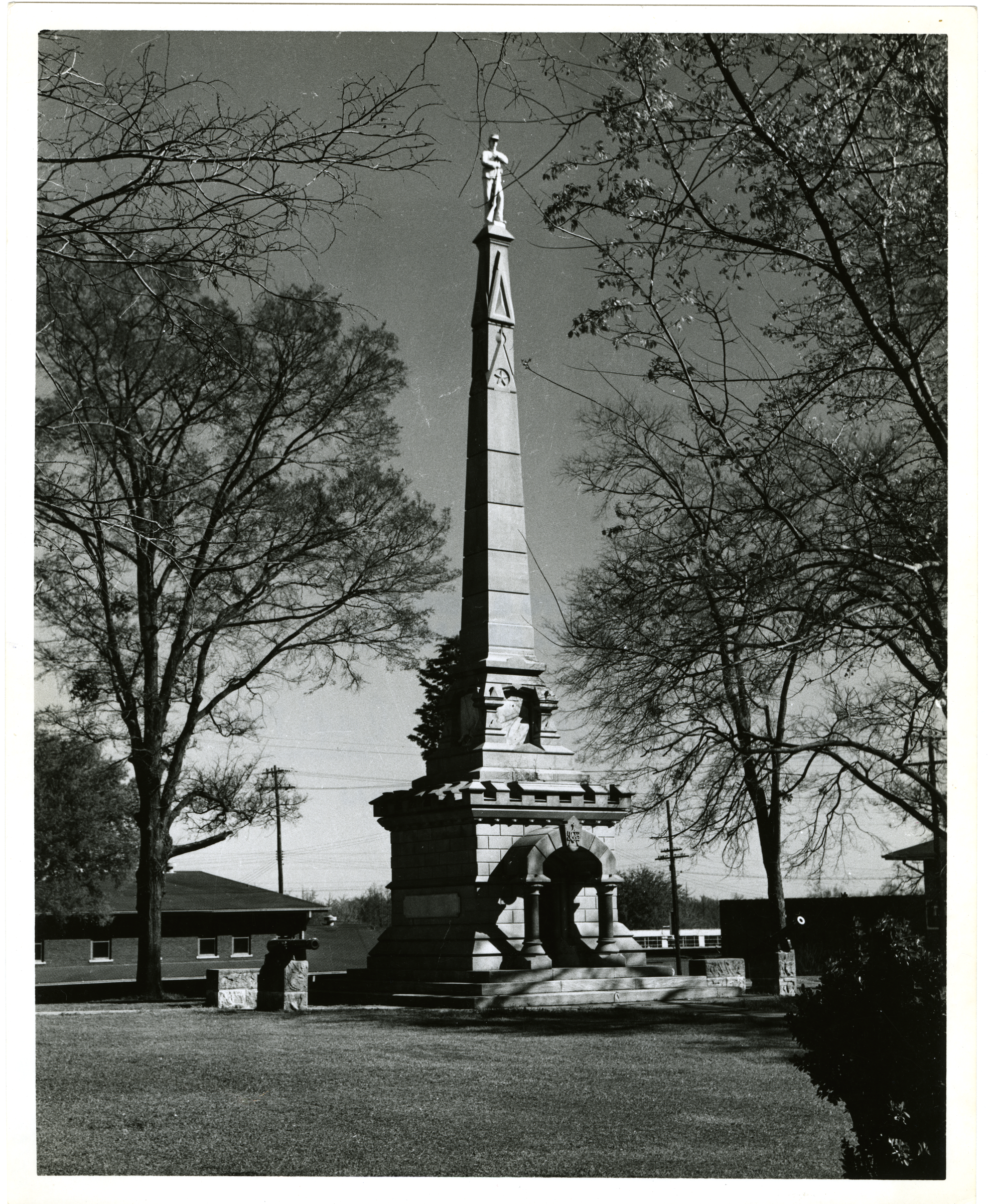

- Location within Mississippi Location within the United States
- Location: Old Capitol Green, Jackson, Mississippi
- Coordinates: 32.299801°N 90.179388°W
- Built: 1891
- Part of: Capitol Green (ID69000083)
- Designated CP: November 25, 1969

The Confederate Monument is a historic monument in Jackson, Mississippi, United States.

== History ==
The monument features a soldier standing on top of an obelisk. It was built in 1891, and its dedication was attended by many veterans of the Confederate States Army. It has been listed on the National Register of Historic Places as a contributing property to the Old Capitol since November 25, 1969.

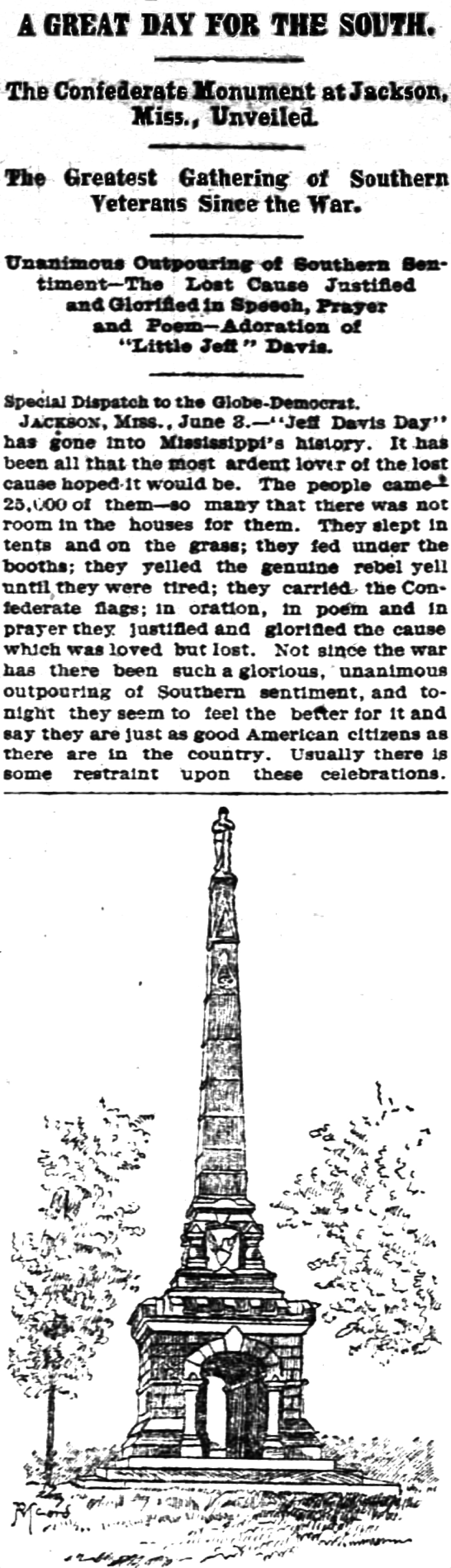
St. Louis (Missouri) Globe-Democrat article from June 1891 concerning dedication of the monument

== See also ==
- List of Confederate monuments and memorials
