= University Greys =

Unit of the Army of Northern Virginia

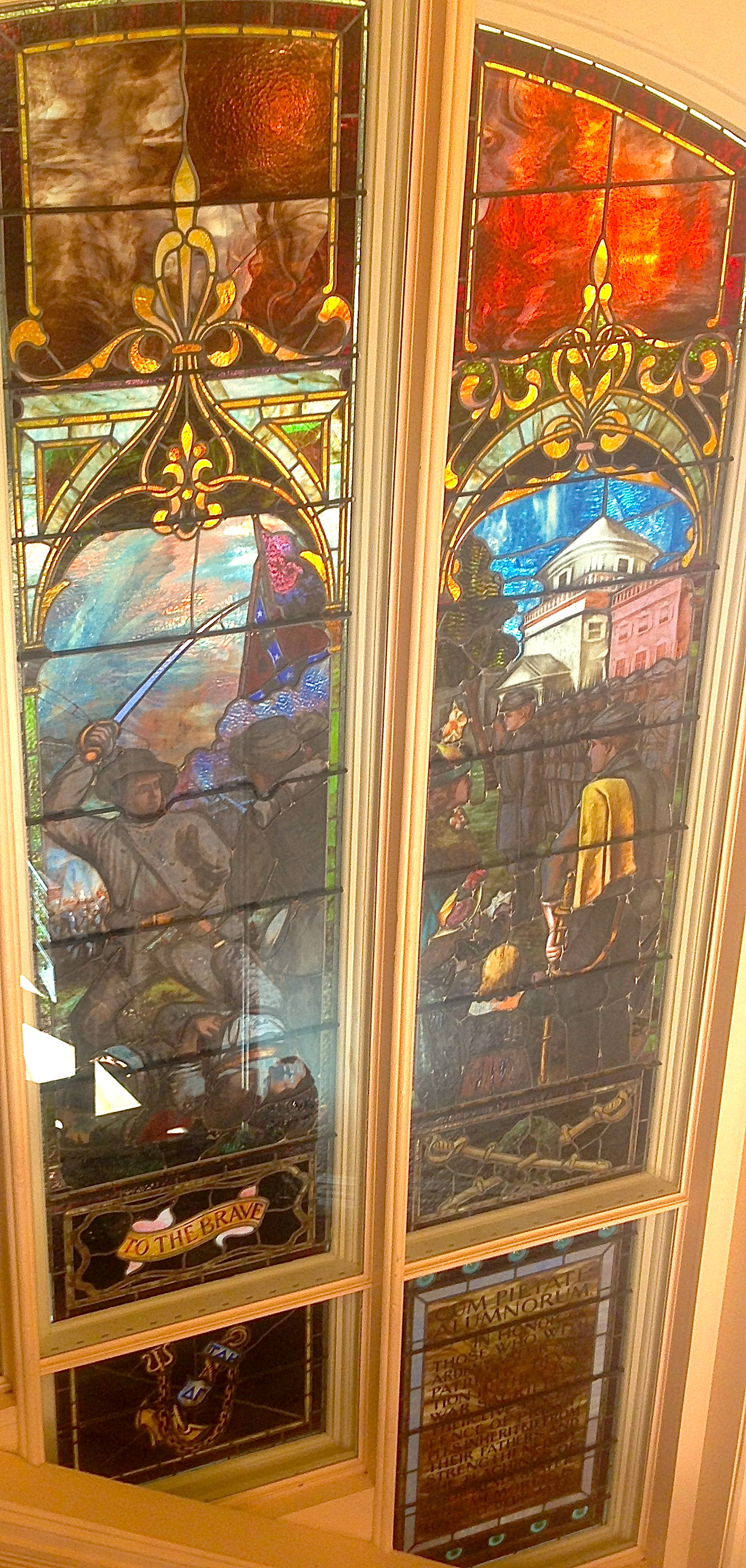
The stained glass window in Ventress Hall dedicated to the University Grays. Oxford, Mississippi

Corporal L. Purnell of Co. I, 11th Mississippi Infantry Regiment

The University Greys (or Grays) were Company A of the 11th Mississippi Infantry Regiment in the Confederate Army during the American Civil War. Part of the Army of Northern Virginia, the Greys served in many of the most famous and bloody battles of the war.

== Formation ==
At the beginning of the American Civil War, most of the student body of the University of Mississippi rallied to the Confederate cause. Some 55 of the students joined the “University Greys” and 17 enlisted with the “Lamar Rifles,” a Lafayette County militia, while others joined with various other state regiments. Because the Greys were drawn from students across the state rather than from Lafayette County alone, the county claimed the right to contribute a second company to the regiment, which became the Lamar Rifles.

The students organized their company in December 1860, in the weeks after Lincoln's election, and elected William B. Lowry as captain, despite opposition from a number of prominent men in the state to the formation of a military company on the campus. The company was uniformed in the gray adopted for Mississippi infantry by the state Military Board in January 1861, and its members were almost all students at the university.. Repeated applications for commissions were at first unsuccessful, but on February 7, 1861, Governor John J. Pettus commissioned the company's officers, and General Griffith mustered the company in on February 22 as part of the Mississippi state troops, to be known as the University Greys. The company received muskets from Jackson in March.

The university faculty continued to treat the Greys as students subject to discipline, and Chancellor Frederick A. P. Barnard asked Pettus to remove Lowry from command; the governor replied that the company's officers held state commissions and were outside his control. Lowry was expelled from the university in March 1861 but remained on campus with his company. In April, after several parents asked that their sons be withdrawn, the faculty required Lowry to dismiss minors whose parents had not consented, and a number of men left the company.

The company was mustered in at Oxford on April 26, 1861, and left the town by train with the Lamar Rifles on May 1. The following day only five students remained in attendance at the university; practically all of the students went on to serve in the Confederate army, and the trustees granted the seniors their degrees in absentia that June. At Corinth on May 4, 1861, the Greys became Company A of the 11th Mississippi Infantry under Col. William H. Moore, and the regiment was mustered into Confederate service at Lynchburg, Virginia, on May 13.

== Engagements ==
Company A, “University Greys”, and Company F, “Noxubee Rifles”, were present on the battlefield and involved in the fighting at the First Battle of Manassas. The rest of the regiment reached the battlefield later and did not take part in the fighting as it had been delayed by a railroad collision. The Greys along with Company F arrived at Manassas around noon on July 20, 1861, with their brigade commander, General Barnard Elliott Bee, and overall commander of the Army of the Shenandoah then Brigadier General Joseph E. Johnston. Lieutenant Colonel Philip Frank Liddell was in direct command of the two companies.

Initially Bee’s Brigade was placed in the rear as reserves so that it could reach either the left or right flank swiftly. After Colonel Nathan G. Evans had engaged with a large force of Federal troops flanking the Confederate left, Bee’s Brigade was ordered there in support. General Bee positioned his men near the Henry house and crossed the valley in support of Colonel Evans. They held against a much larger force, when after an hour they began to be outflanked and fell back behind Jackson’s line, which was forming near Bee’s initial position. There the survivors had lost cohesion, but were eventually reorganized.

The company's losses in its first engagement were eleven men, six of whom died.

Company A casualties at the First Battle of Manassas, July 21, 1861
Name	Fate	Notes
Second Lieutenant Levins M. Bisland	Died of wounds	Wounded July 21; died July 23, 1861, in hospital near Manassas
Andrew J. Johnson	Killed in action	
James S. Meek	Killed in action	Given as Junius Sylvester Meek in Brown's narrative
First Sergeant Henry M. Rice	Killed in action	
John Y. Lilley	Died of wounds	Died August 11, 1861, at Charlottesville
Sterling S. Tarpley	Died of wounds	Died August 2, 1861 (also shown as August 7), in hospital near Manassas
Sergeant George M. Moseley	Wounded	Discharged on surgeon's certificate of disability, September 7, 1861
James Edward Jarman	Wounded	Discharged on surgeon's certificate of disability, October 17, 1861; according to his sister, later enlisted in a cavalry unit
Sergeant Calvin R. Myers	Wounded	Later wounded at Sharpsburg and captured at Gettysburg
Corporal William J. Lamkin	Wounded	Transferred to Company E, 16th Mississippi, August 1862
Corporal John T. Kerr	Wounded	Discharged December 17, 1861

The official Confederate return for the battle recorded the regiment's losses, covering both engaged companies, as 7 enlisted men killed and 14 wounded, an aggregate of 21. A member of Company I wrote four days after the battle that the two companies had lost 8 killed and 39 wounded.

The Greys also fought at the Battle of Gaines's Mill, the Battle of Malvern Hill, the Second Battle of Manassas, the Battle of South Mountain and the Battle of Antietam.

As a unit of the division under the command of Brigadier General J. Johnston Pettigrew in Pickett's Charge at the Battle of Gettysburg, when the Confederates made a desperate frontal assault on the Union entrenchments atop Cemetery Ridge on July 3, 1863. As part of Davis' brigade, the Greys advanced the longest distance towards the Union lines, but they never reached the Federal position. Harassed by artillery fire, musketry from the entrenched line on Cemetery Ridge and a flank attack from the 8th Ohio, the unit never progressed much farther than the Emmitsburg Road. Every soldier in the company who started the assault was either killed, wounded or captured.

After Gettysburg, the depleted Greys were merged with Company G (the "Lamar Rifles"). The unit continued to fight until the last days of the war.

A statistical recapitulation of the company's service, prepared after the war by Capt. John V. Moore and published in The Weekly Clarion on September 27, 1866, recorded 136 names on the company's muster rolls. Of these, 24 men and 2 officers were killed in action, 4 died of wounds, and one was killed accidentally; 66 men and 6 officers were wounded, with 95 wounds received in all, and 11 men were permanently disabled. Nine were killed in their first engagement and 14 were captured. The company drew 133 men born in Southern states and 3 born abroad, representing 21 professions and 12 states and kingdoms, with an average age of just over 21 years.

== Officers ==
The company's original officers were commissioned by Governor John J. Pettus on February 7, 1861: Captain William B. Lowry, First Lieutenant Calvin B. McCaleb, Second Lieutenant Levins M. Bisland, and Third Lieutenant William A. Raines.

Officers of the University Greys:

Captains

- William B. Lowry, wounded at Seven Pines, promoted lieutenant colonel September 25, 1862
- Simeon Marsh, resigned August 1, 1863
- John V. Moore, August 1, 1863

First Lieutenants

- Calvin B. McCaleb, resigned December 1, 1861
- John H. Graham, resigned on account of wounds November 25, 1862

Second Lieutenants

- Levins M. Bisland, died of wounds received at Manassas, July 23, 1861
- Jefferson H. McLemore, retired April 21, 1862
- Patrick S. Myers, resigned November 4, 1861
- Joseph L. Taylor, resigned January 10, 1864, on account of wounds
- Francis O. Dailey, killed at Gettysburg, July 3, 1863
- Wilborn L. Anthony, commission expired at surrender (Note: Brown's list gives Anthony and Rodgers as second lieutenants. Rowland (1908), p. 437 lists both as third lieutenants, while the Historical Roll gives Anthony as first lieutenant and Rodgers as private and second lieutenant.)
- David C. C. Rodgers, commission expired at surrender

Third Lieutenants

- William A. Raines, killed at Gettysburg (Note: Raines appears in the February 1861 commissioning and in Rowland's officer list, but the Historical Roll notes that he is "mentioned in histories of the Eleventh Mississippi but not in this roster.")

Other

- Lieutenant Charles O. Brooks, commanding June 1864

== In popular culture ==
In William Faulkner's 1936 novel Absalom, Absalom!, the characters Henry Sutpen and Charles Bon join the University Greys at the outbreak of the Civil War.

The story of the University Greys is memorialized in an opera composed by Dr. Arthur Kreutz, who was Professor of Music at the University of Mississippi, using text from the book of the same name by Zoe Lund Schiller. The opera was published by Ricordi of New York in 1961. A copy of the score resides in the library of the Northern Illinois University. The opera was given its first performance in 1961 at the University of Mississippi under the auspices of the Department of Music.

In Ventress Hall at the University of Mississippi, a stained glass window in Ventress Hall depicts a mustering of the University Greys.

== See also ==
- List of Mississippi Civil War Confederate units
- 11th Mississippi Infantry Monument
- Confederate Monument (Oxford, Mississippi)
