= Jefferson Davis Presidential Library and Museum =

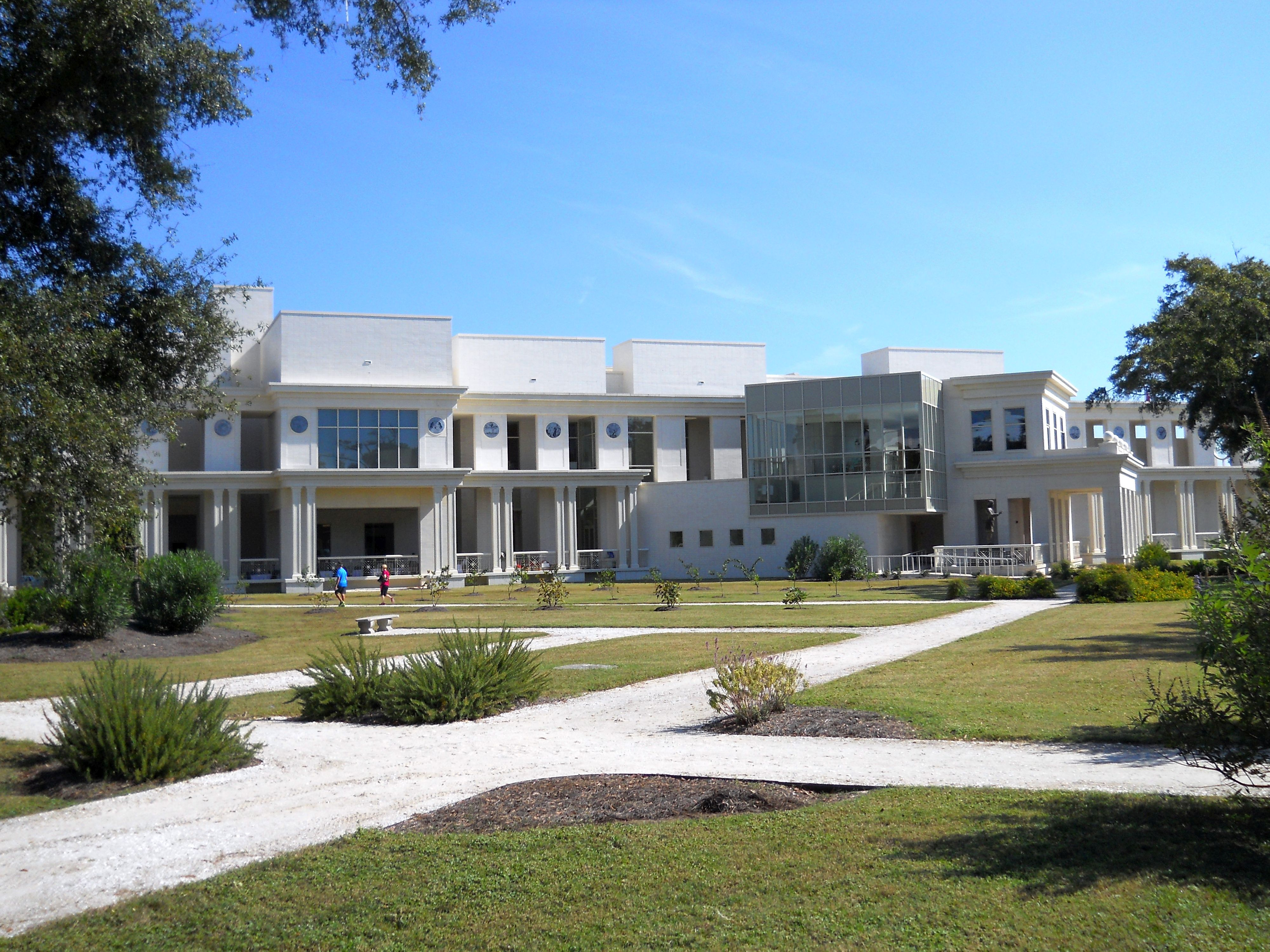
- West façade of the Library and Museum

- Location within Mississippi

General information
- Location: Biloxi, Mississippi, U.S.
- Coordinates: 30°23′35.2″N 88°58′12.2″W
- Named for: Jefferson Davis
- Inaugurated: Dedicated on May 30, 1998; Rededicated on June 3, 2013
- Cost: $11.5 million
- Operator: Mississippi Division, S.C.V.

Technical details
- Size: 24,000 square feet (2,200 m^{2})

Design and construction
- Architect: Larry Albert

Other information
- Public transit: CTA

Website
- www.visitbeauvoir.org

The Jefferson Davis Presidential Library and Museum is the library of Jefferson Davis, President of the Confederate States from 1861 to 1865. Managed by Sons of Confederate Veterans, the library is located within the Beauvoir historical site in Biloxi, Mississippi, United States.

== Facilities ==
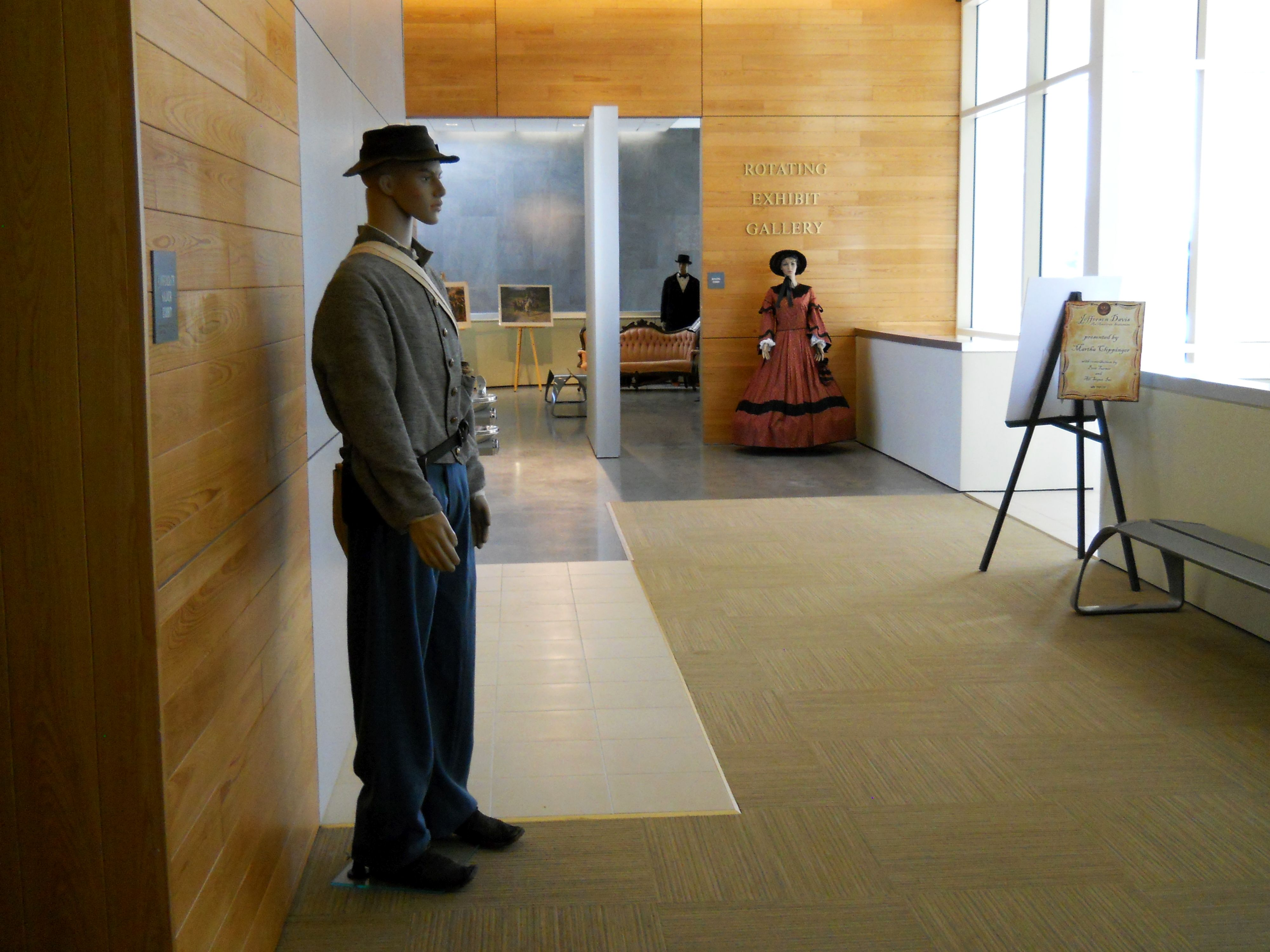
The library's Rotating Exhibit Gallery

The library has the stated purpose of preserving, housing, and making available the official papers, records, artifacts, and other historical materials of Jefferson Davis. Despite the name, it is not administered by the National Archives and Records Administration, as Jefferson Davis was never president of the United States. It is, however, supported by the State of Mississippi, as is described on a plaque at the library entrance. The library is managed by the Mississippi Division, Sons of Confederate Veterans, and features continually changing temporary exhibits and a permanent exhibit covering Davis's life.

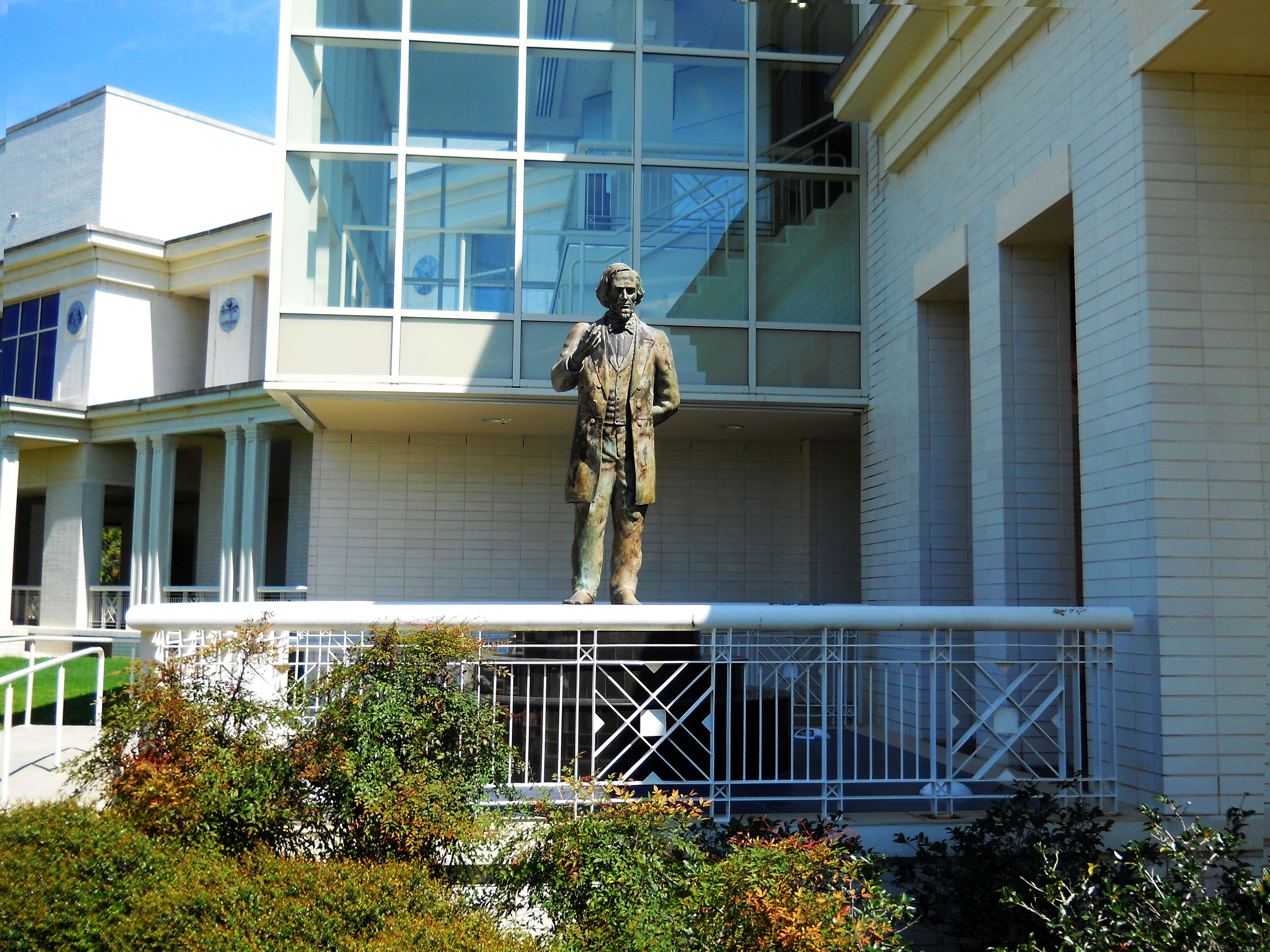
William Beckwith's sculpture of Jefferson Davis at the museum

On August 29, 2005, the library suffered heavy damage from the fierce wind and water of Hurricane Katrina. The library pavilion, the Hayes Cottage, the Soldiers Home barracks replica, the Confederate Soldiers Museum, the gift shop, and the director's home were totally destroyed. Artifacts were photographed, inventoried, boxed, and placed in environmental storage while conservation of the items and Beauvoir Historic Site were underway. On January 9, 2007, the library accepted a $4.1 million bid to rebuild the library and museum. Because of hurricane damage, renovation of the original library was deemed impossible; a rebuilt library was rededicated and opened to the public on June 3, 2013. The Federal Emergency Management Agency paid $4 million to repair Beauvoir and an additional $10 million to construct the new library. A statue of Davis by sculptor William Beckwith is on display outside the museum.

== See also ==
- List of memorials to Jefferson Davis
