= Tomb of the Unknown Confederate Soldier =

Military memorial in Mississippi, United States

Coordinates: 30.394976°N 88.97184°W

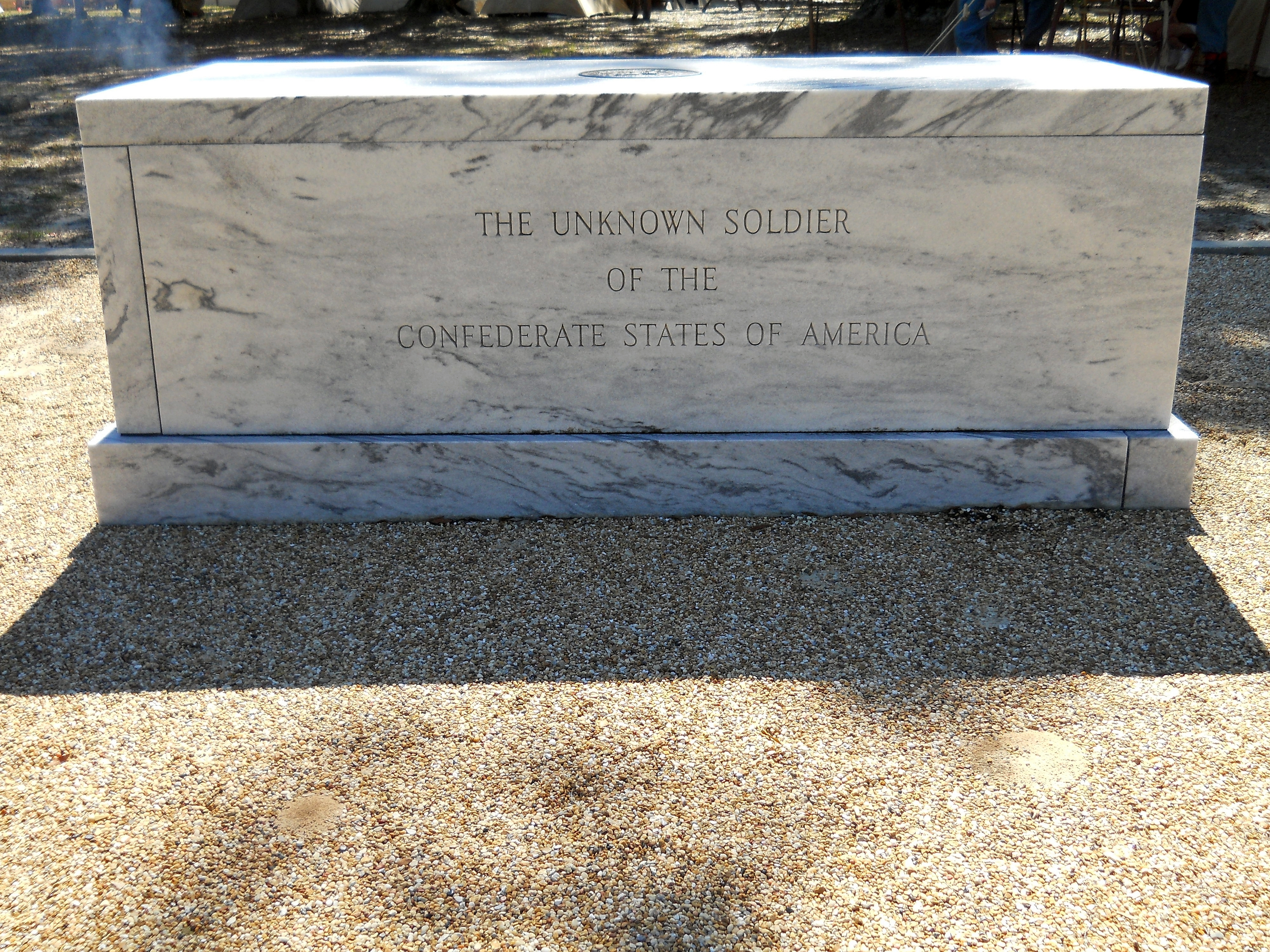
Tomb of the Unknown Confederate Soldier in 2012

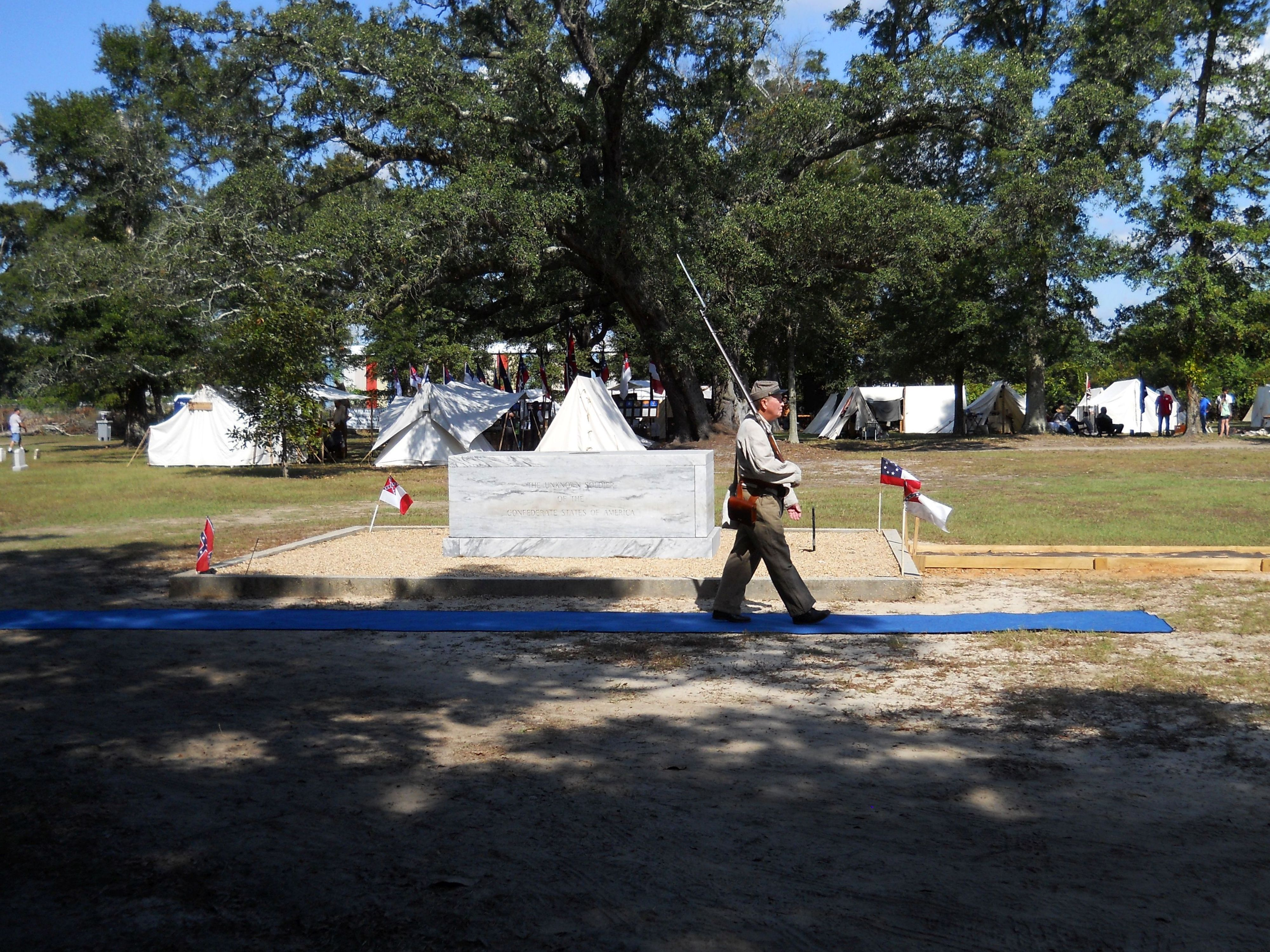
Honor Guard at Tomb of the Unknown Confederate Soldier during Fall Muster, 2014

The Tomb of the Unknown Confederate Soldier is a tomb on the grounds of Beauvoir in Biloxi, Mississippi, that holds the remains of an unidentified Confederate soldier of the American Civil War.

The remains were discovered by Rick Forte of Hattiesburg in late 1979 on a battlefield of the Vicksburg Campaign. Artifacts accompanying the remains showed that the person had been a Confederate soldier but did not show the person's identity, unit, or place of origin.

The discovery led to the establishment of the Tomb of the Unknown Confederate Soldier in the Confederate Veterans Cemetery at Beauvoir. The soldier's remains were buried there in a cypress casket in 1980. The tomb, inscribed "Known but to God", was dedicated on June 6, 1981. Approval of the plan and official designation was sought and received from all recognized Confederate organizations, including the Sons of Confederate Veterans, United Daughters of the Confederacy, Military Order of the Stars and Bars, and Children of the Confederacy.

The tomb's two sides are inscribed: "The Unknown Soldier of the Confederate States of America." The head of the tomb bears the inscription: Known but to God. Atop of the tomb is the Great Seal of the Confederate States of America, and at its foot is a stanza from the poem CSA by Abram Joseph Ryan. Like the Arlington Tomb of the Unknown Soldier, the Tomb of the Unknown Confederate Soldier has its own honor guard.

== See also ==
- Civil War Unknowns Monument
- "The Grave of the Unknown Confederate Soldier" in Rebel State Historic Site in Louisiana.
