= 11th Mississippi Infantry Regiment =

Infantry regiment of the Confederate States Army

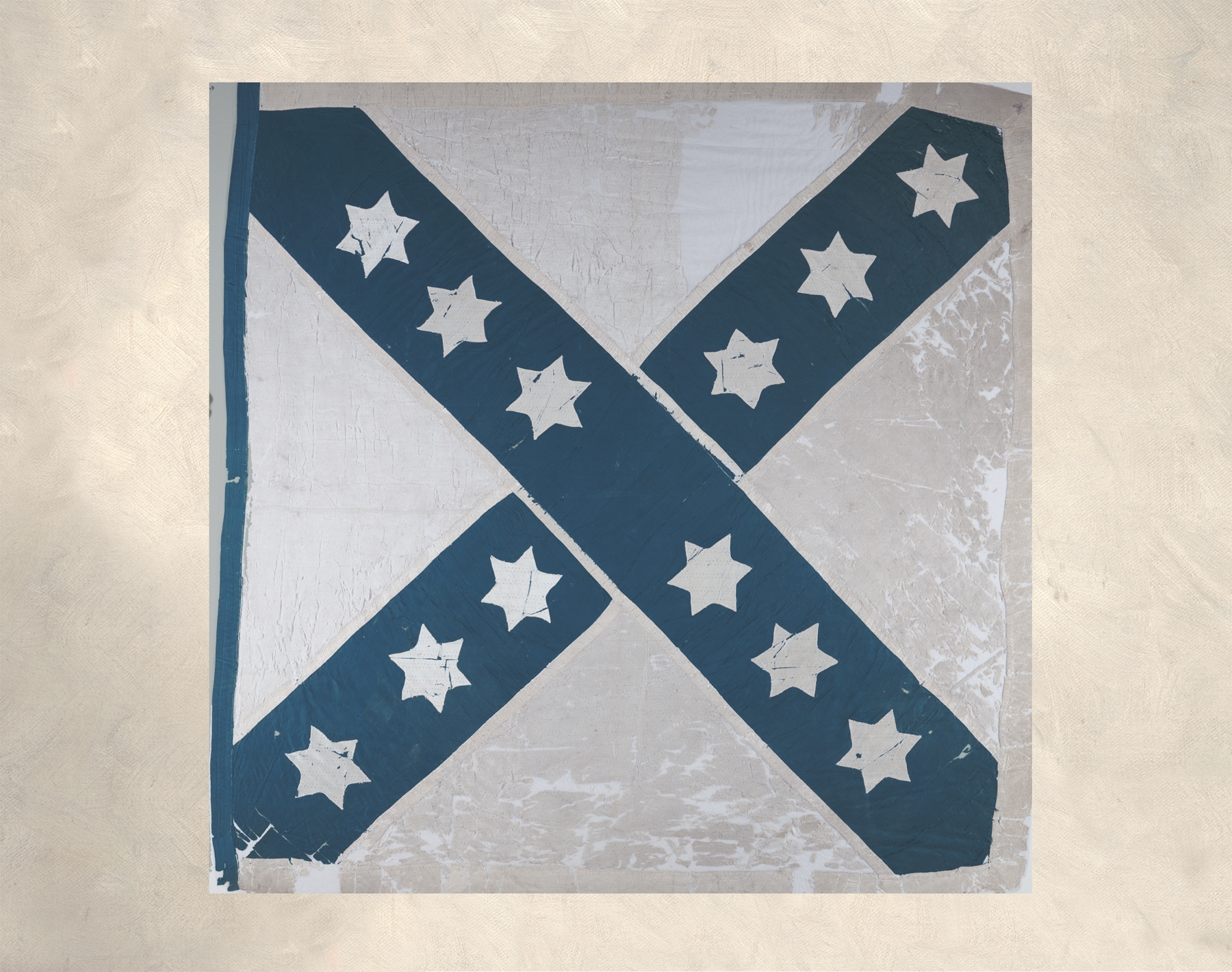
- Regimental Color of the 11th Mississippi captured at Antietam by the Second Massachusetts
- Active: 1861–1865
- Disbanded: April 12, 1865
- Country: Confederate States
- Allegiance: Mississippi
- Branch: Army
- Type: Infantry
- Engagements: American Civil War; Battle of First Manassas; Battle of Seven Pines; Seven Days Battles; Battle of Second Manassas; Battle of Antietam; Battle of Gettysburg; Battle of Cold Harbor; Third Battle of Petersburg

The 11th Mississippi Infantry Regiment was an infantry formation of the Confederate States Army which fought in numerous battles of the Eastern Theater of the American Civil War.

== History ==
The 11th Mississippi Infantry Regiment was established at Corinth, Mississippi, in May, 1861, and mustered at Lynchburg, Virginia. Company A, the "University Greys" consisted of almost the entire student body of the University of Mississippi. This reduced enrollment at the university to such a low level that the university closed for the remainder of the war. The regiment reported a total strength of 504 men in April, 1862. The 11th Mississippi saw action at the Battle of First Manassas under General Barnard Elliott Bee, before being assigned to the Army of Northern Virginia.

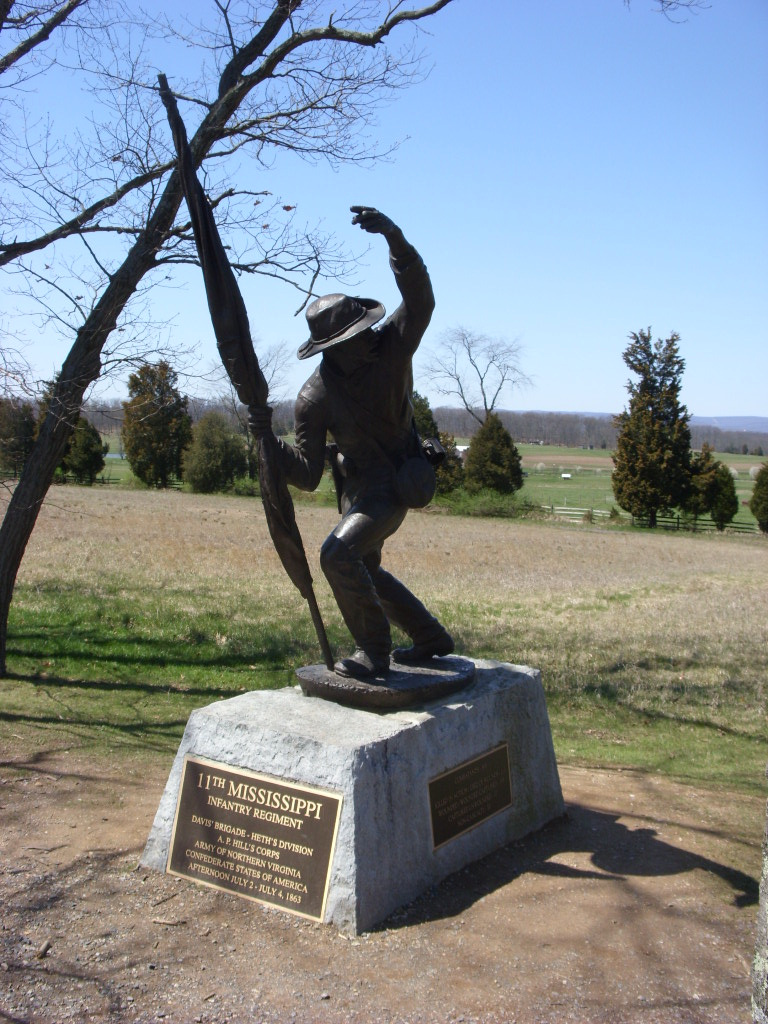
Monument to the 11th Mississippi at Gettysburg.

In Virginia in 1862, the 11th Regiment fought at Seven Pines, the Seven Days Battles near Richmond, and Second Manassas under the command of General William H.C. Whiting. In Maryland at the Battle of Antietam, the 11th Regiment was involved in heavy fighting: Colonel Philip F. Liddell and Major T.S. Evans were killed, Lieutenant Colonel Samuel F. Butler was wounded, and the regimental flag was captured.

In late 1862, the 11th Regiment was reassigned to the command of General Joseph R. Davis, and was sent north as part of the Gettysburg campaign in the summer of 1863. During the second day of the Battle of Gettysburg, the 11th fought at Cemetery Ridge, taking heavy fire while charging the Union lines. On the retreat south from Gettysburg, the 11th fought at Bristoe Station and Mine Run before reaching winter quarters in Virginia.

In 1864, the 11th Regiment fought at the Battle of the Wilderness, Spotsylvania Court House, and Cold Harbor. After being moved back to Petersburg, Virginia, the 11th formed part of the defending Confederate force during the siege of that city until the Union breakthrough in early April, 1865. Most of the surviving men of the 11th Mississippi were taken prisoner and the regiment was disbanded by its final commander, Lieutenant Colonel George W. Shannon.

An analysis of the muster rolls of the 11th Mississippi showed that of the regiment's 1,570 soldiers, 431 died during the war, 504 were wounded, 103 were captured, and 240 were discharged or disabled, and 30 deserted, resulting in a total casualty rate of 70%.

== Commanders ==
- Col. F. M. Green
- Col. Philip F. Liddell, killed at Antietam, 1862.
- Col. William H. Moore
- Col. Reuben O. Reynolds, wounded in action.
- Lt. Col. Samuel F. Butler
- Lt. Col. William B. Lowry
- Lt. Col. George W. Shannon
- Maj. T. S. Evans, killed at Antietam, 1862.
- Maj. Alexander H. Franklin

== Organization ==
Companies of the 11th Mississippi Infantry Regiment:

- Company A, "University Greys", composed of students from the University of Mississippi at Oxford.
- Company B, "Coahoma Invincibles" of Coahoma County.
- Company C, "Prairie Rifles" of Okolona.
- Company D, "Neshoba Rifles" of Neshoba County.
- Company E, "Prairie Guards" of Lowndes County.
- Company F, "Noxubee Rifles" of Noxubee County.
- Company G, "Lamar Rifles" of Lafayette County.
- Company H, "Chickasaw Guards" of Chickasaw County.
- Company I, "Van Dorn Reserve" of Monroe County.
- Company K, "Carroll County Rifles" of Carroll County.

== In popular culture ==
In William Faulkner's 1936 novel Absalom, Absalom!, the characters Henry Sutpen and Charles Bon join Company A of the 11th Mississippi, (the "University Greys") at the outbreak of the Civil War.

== See also ==
- List of Mississippi Civil War Confederate units
- 11th Mississippi Infantry Monument
- University Greys

== Bibliography ==
- Stubbs, Steven Howard (2000). Duty, Honor, Valor: The Story of the Eleventh Mississippi Infantry Regiment. Philadelphia, MI: Dancing Rabbit Press. 948 pages.
