= Rebel State Historic Site =

Historic site in Louisiana, USA

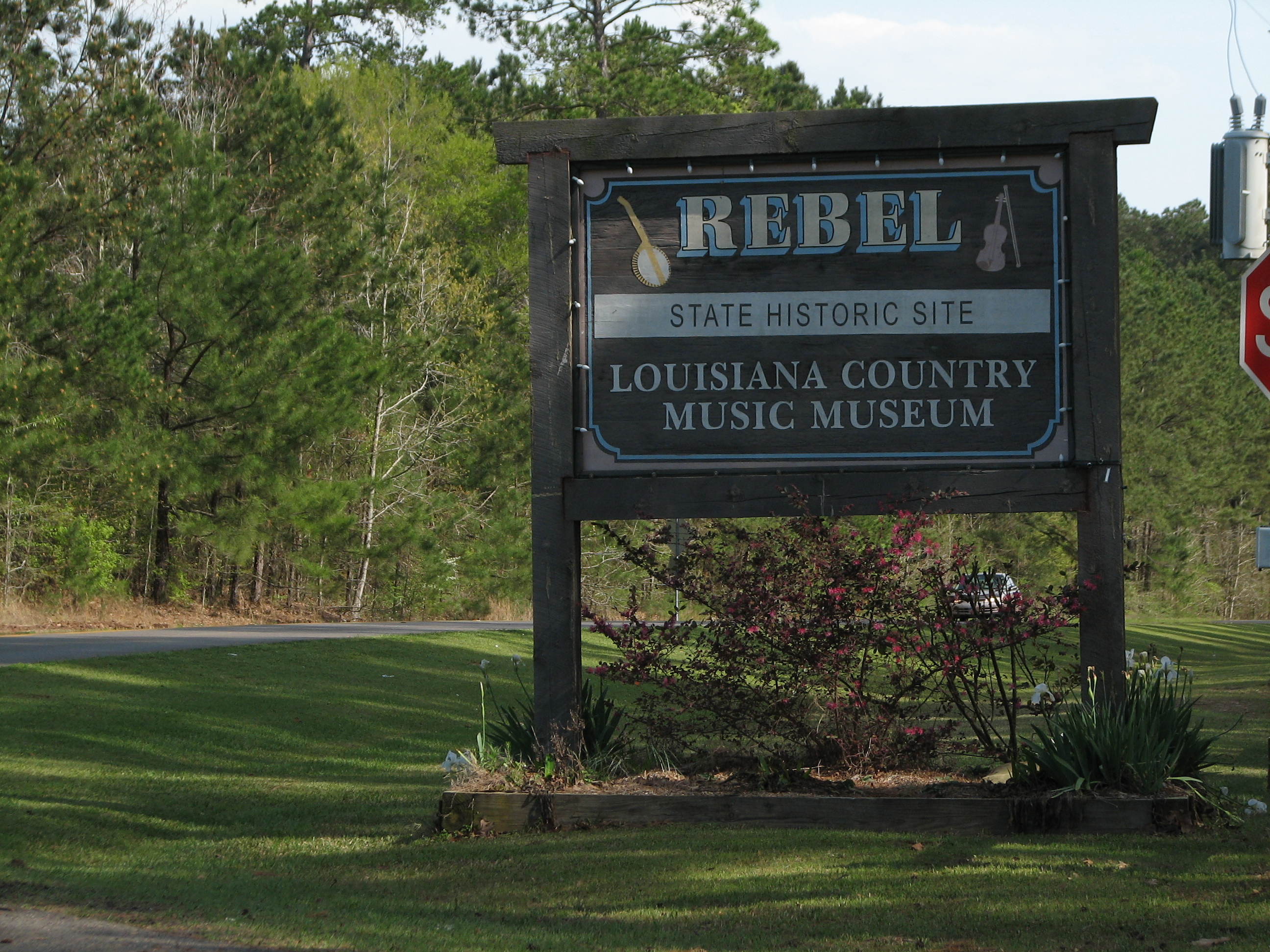
- Entrance sign to the historic site.

- Location within Louisiana
- Location: Natchitoches Parish, Louisiana, United States of America
- Coordinates: 31°44′58″N 93°05′13″W
- Area: approx. 46 acres (19 ha)
- Governing body: Louisiana Office of State Parks
- Website: Official web page

Rebel State Historic Site is operated by the state of Louisiana and is located near Marthaville in Natchitoches Parish.

The historic site commemorates the history and culture of northwestern Louisiana. The site, formerly a state commemorative area, was originally meant to honor an unknown Confederate soldier who was killed in the vicinity by three Union cavalrymen. With time, it also became a local meeting place for people to listen to country and gospel music. Rebel State Historic Site today includes an amphitheater and stage for occasional live music performances, a pavilion and the Louisiana Country Music Museum. The museum exhibits memorabilia donated by Louisiana natives who became prominent in country and gospel music. Among these items a fiddle and yo-yo that belonged to Roy Acuff and a shirt that belonged to Hank Williams Jr.

Outdoor visitor facilities include picnic areas and two short walking trails.

Rebel State Historic Site shut down to regular visitation in 2016. Visitation is now only available by appointment with a two-week advance notice.

The "Grave of the Unknown Confederate Soldier" (Note: Not to be confused with the Tomb of the Unknown Confederate Soldier in Mississippi.) is in Rebel State Park.

== See also ==
- List of music museums
