= Beauvoir (Biloxi, Mississippi) =

Home of Jefferson Davis

- U.S. National Register of Historic Places
- U.S. National Historic Landmark
- Mississippi Landmark
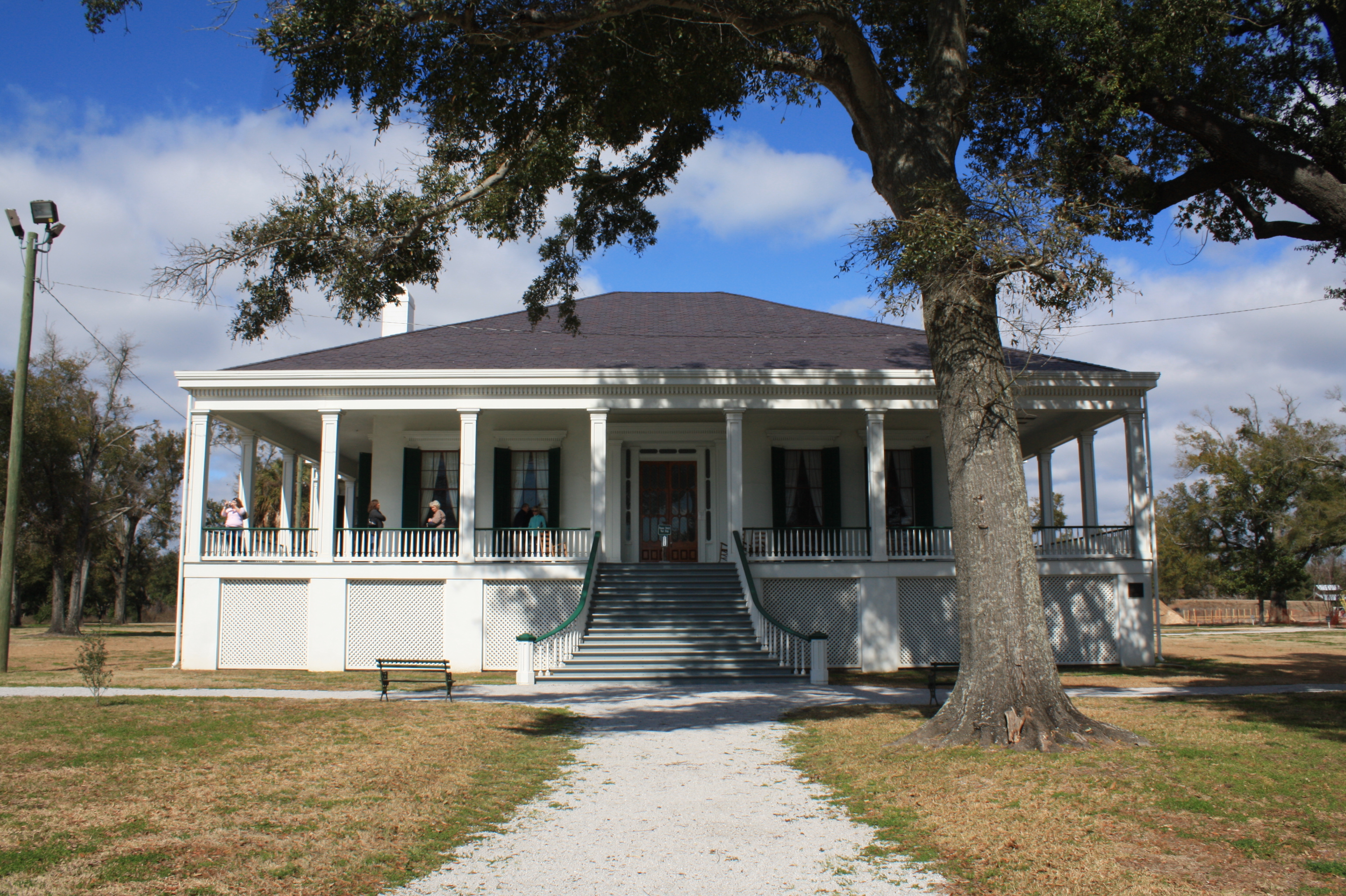
- Beauvoir in February 2010

- Location within Mississippi Location within the United States
- Location: 2244 Beach Blvd, Biloxi, Mississippi
- Coordinates: 30°23′33″N 88°58′15″W
- Built: 1848
- NRHP reference No.: 71000448
- USMS No.: 047-BLX-1402.1-NHL-ML

Significant dates
- Added to NRHP: September 3, 1971
- Designated NHL: November 7, 1993
- Designated USMS: October 24, 1985

The Beauvoir estate, built in Biloxi, Mississippi, along the Gulf of Mexico, was the post-war home (1876–1889) of the former President of the Confederate States of America Jefferson Davis. The National Park Service designated the house and plantation as a National Historic Landmark in 1974.

Samuel Dorsey, a planter, purchased the estate in 1873. After Dorsey died in 1875, his widow, Sarah Dorsey, learned that Davis was facing difficulties. Dorsey invited Davis to visit the plantation, offering him a cottage near the main house where he could live and work on his memoirs. Davis ended up living there the rest of his life with his wife, Varina Davis, and his youngest daughter, Varina Anne Davis (known as "Winnie").

Ill with cancer in 1878, Dorsey remade her will, bequeathing Beauvoir to Jefferson Davis and making Winnie the residuary legatee, inheriting after her father died. The three Davises lived at Beauvoir until Jefferson Davis died in 1889. Varina and Winnie moved to New York City in 1891.

After Winnie died in 1898, Varina Davis inherited the plantation. Davis sold it in 1902 to the Mississippi Division of the Sons of Confederate Veterans with the stipulation that it be used as a Confederate States Army veterans home and later as a memorial to her husband. Barracks were built nearby, and the property was used as such a home until 1957, with the death of the last Confederate veteran in Mississippi. At that time, the main house was adapted as a house museum. In 1998, a library was completed and opened on-site.

Beauvoir survived Hurricane Camille in 1969. The main house and library were badly damaged, and other outbuildings were destroyed during Hurricane Katrina on August 29, 2005. The house was restored and reopened while work continued on the library.

== Description ==
The name "Beauvoir" means "beautiful to view". When Davis lived there, Beauvoir consisted of approximately 608 acres (2.46 km^{2}). Cedars, oaks, and magnolia trees surrounded the house, which once had an orange grove behind it. The home faces the Gulf of Mexico, and Spanish moss hangs from many of the large old trees on the property. Oyster Bayou, a freshwater impediment and bay-head swamp once connected directly to the Mississippi Sound, runs across the property behind the main house from West to East. This body of water is fed by natural artesian springs on the grounds. The northeast portion of the estate is the site of a primitive, pre-urban hardwood forest with an environment similar to what existed in the area during the 1800s.

Today, the site is approximately 52 acres (21 ha) in size). It is located across US Highway 90 from Biloxi Beach. The compound now consists of a Louisiana-raised summer cottage-style residence, a botanical garden, a former Confederate veterans home, a modern gift shop, a Confederate Soldier Museum, the Jefferson Davis Presidential Library and Museum, various outbuildings, and a historic Confederate cemetery, which includes the Tomb of the Unknown Confederate Soldier. Five of seven of these buildings were destroyed in Hurricane Katrina, and replicas are being planned. Current proposals envision restoring Oyster Bayou to its original environmental state, although this area suffered extensive damage from Hurricane Katrina.

== History ==
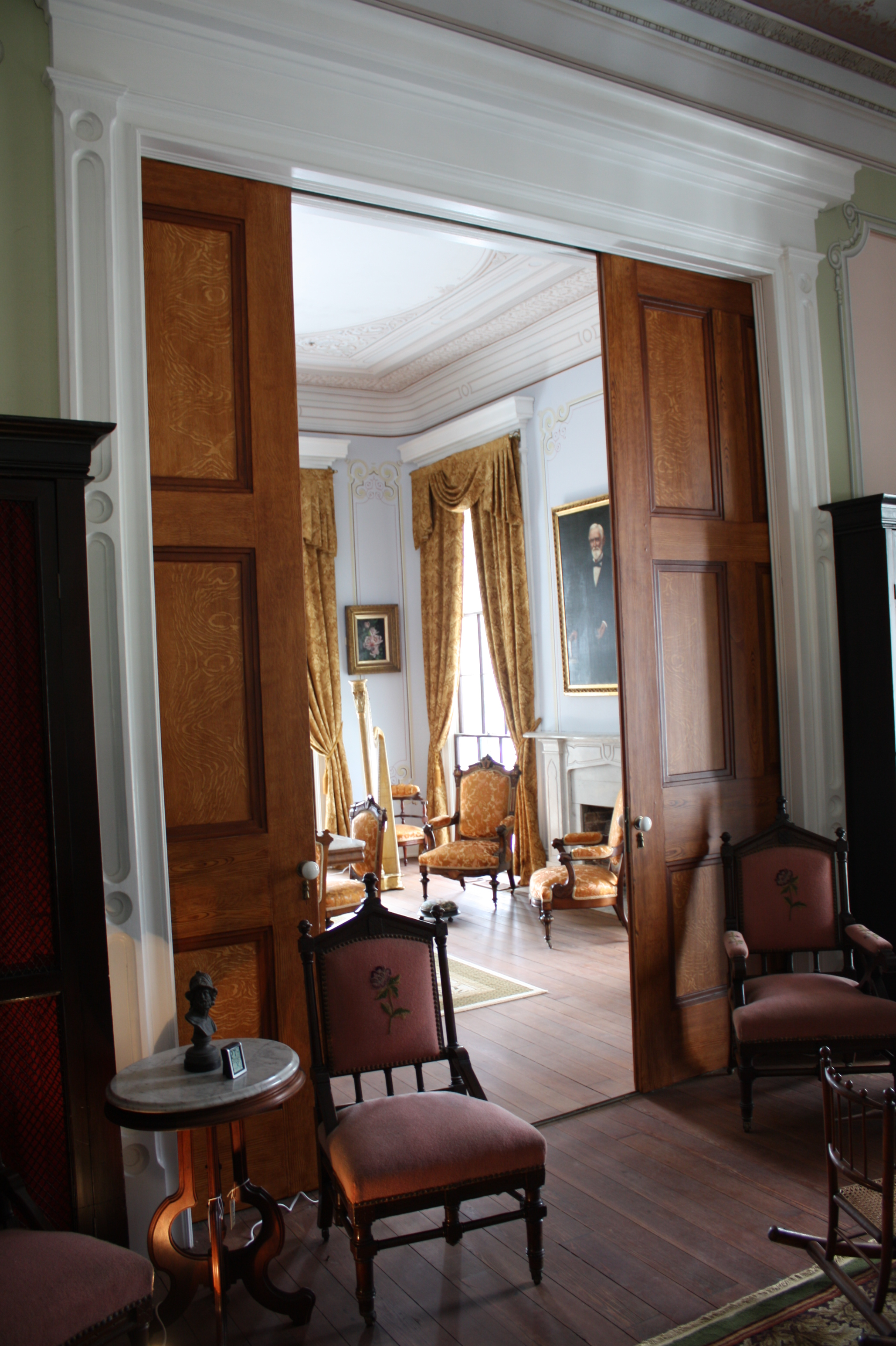
View from rear parlor into front parlor in February 2010.

Beauvoir was built by James Brown, a planter and entrepreneur, in 1848 and was completed in 1852. In 1873 the property was sold to Frank Johnston and soon thereafter to Samuel and Sarah Anne Ellis Dorsey. They operated the plantation to cultivate cotton. Sarah Dorsey was a novelist and historian who wrote a biography of the Louisiana wartime governor, Henry Watkins Allen. It has been considered a prominent example of Lost Cause literature. Born and reared in Natchez, Mississippi, she was part of the prominent Percy family in the South. After her husband, who was older, died in 1875, the widow Dorsey lived in the main house with her half-brother Mortimer Dahlgren.

In 1876, having heard of Jefferson Davis' financial and personal difficulties, Dorsey invited Davis to stay at Beauvoir. She made a cottage available to him and assisted him in writing his memoir, The Rise and Fall of the Confederate Government (1881), by organizing, taking dictation, and encouraging him.

Davis accepted Dorsey's invitation and moved into the cottage now known as the Library Pavilion on the plantation grounds in 1877. Later, his wife Varina joined him.

Davis arranged to purchase the property in 1879 for $5500 (~$156,494 in 2024) to be paid in three installments. In 1878, Dorsey had rewritten her will as she knew she was dying; she bequeathed the plantation to Davis and his daughter. Dorsey died in 1879.

Davis and Varina moved into the main house with their youngest daughter, Winnie. She was single as they had refused to let her marry into the family of a Yankee abolitionist. Davis lived in the home until his death in December 1889. Varina Davis remained on the property while writing her book Jefferson Davis: A Memoir (1890). She and her daughter Winnie moved to New York City in 1892.

Dorsey had provided that, after Davis' death, Beauvoir would go to his daughter. At her death in 1898, the property was inherited by Varina Howell Davis. In 1902, she sold much of the property to the Mississippi Division of the Sons of Confederate Veterans (SCV) to be used as a home for Confederate veterans and widows and later as a memorial to her husband. The SCV built a dozen barracks buildings, a hospital, and a chapel behind the main house. From 1903 to 1957, approximately 2,500 veterans and their families lived at the home. Many veterans were buried in a cemetery on the property.

In 1941 the main house opened for public tours. Eventually, a Confederate Museum was opened on the site. Over the next few decades, a Jefferson Davis Gallery, gift shop, the Tomb of the Unknown Confederate Soldier, and the Jefferson Davis Presidential Library and Museum were established on the grounds.

In 1969 the home survived Hurricane Camille. It needed some repairs and restoration after flooding.

In 1998 the Mississippi Division of the Sons of Confederate Veterans opened the Jefferson Davis Presidential Library. It contains the personal library and papers of Jefferson Davis, a biographical exhibit, and a theater and lecture hall.

=== Hurricane Katrina ===
==== Damage assessment ====
Beauvoir

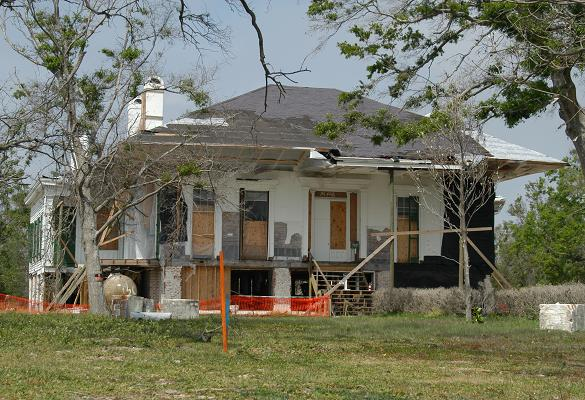
Damage to Beauvoir at 6 months after Hurricane Katrina (April 2006)

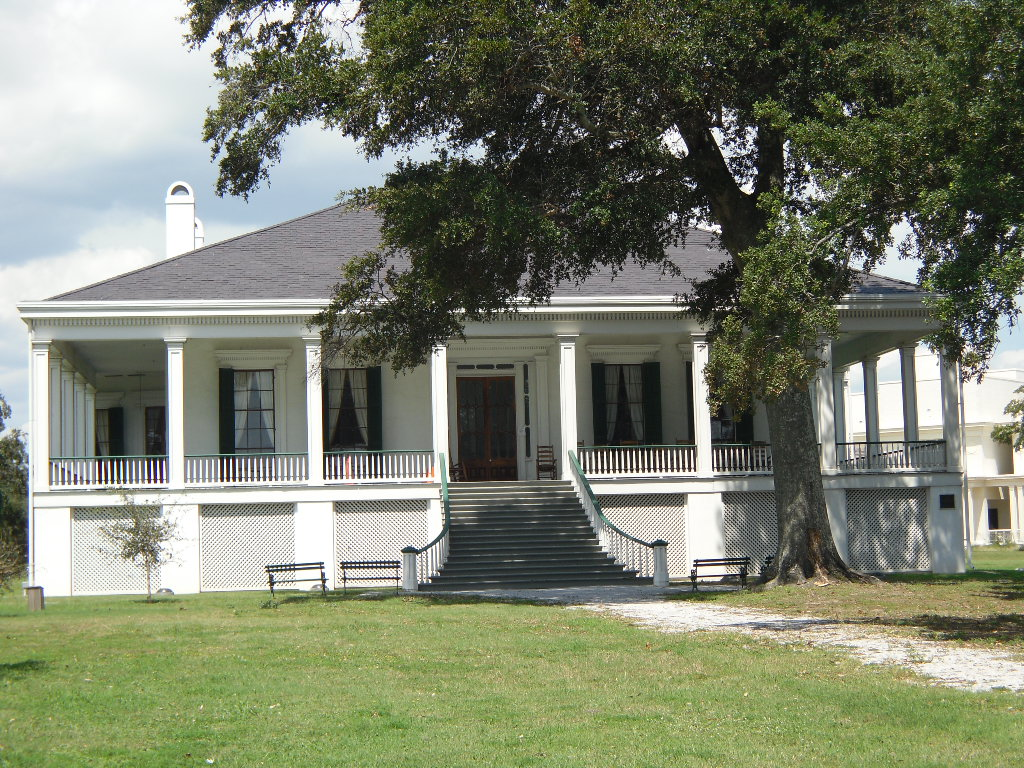
Beauvoir following restoration, as it appeared in September 2012

On August 29, 2005, the main building was severely damaged, losing its newly refurbished galleries (porches) and a section of its roof, but not destroyed by Hurricane Katrina, which hit the Biloxi-Gulfport area head-on. The Clarion-Ledger reported on August 31 that Beauvoir was "virtually demolished," overstating the damage. The storm destroyed the Hayes Cottage, the Library Pavilion, a barracks replica, the Confederate Museum, and the director's home. The storm gutted the first floor of the Davis Presidential Library. Approximately 40% of the collection was lost.

Although the extensive damage from Hurricane Katrina required a massive restoration project for Beauvoir, the publicity caused detailed U.S. Government photos of the building to become widely available, revealing some architectural details and part of the internal structure of the original construction.

At the Beauvoir entranceway, above the door and left-side window, dentil molding appears along the lintel of the door and window. The internal construction of the building is also revealed, seen in exposed areas of the structure, such as the basement red-brick pillars or the wooden wall frames, with wooden latticework backing the external plaster covering. The exterior shell of Beauvoir was protected by six fireplaces surrounding the house's core. Of those six brick fireplaces reinforcing the outside walls, only one of six rooftop chimneys collapsed during the hurricane. Five of the six fireplaces retained sufficient structural integrity to keep the walls of the building from falling away while underwater.

On the back, west wing of Beauvoir, behind a front-yard tree, the green storm shutters survived the floating debris that battered the entrance. The shutters protected the glass panes despite the 24-foot (8-m) storm surge that submerged the area. Whole sections of the Beauvoir home have remained intact to preserve many of the original construction details and windows (as seen in the photograph excerpts, at right).

==== Restoration – buildings ====
Since thousands of homes in Mississippi were damaged or destroyed during Hurricane Katrina, construction work was diverted to all state disaster areas. Restoration of Beauvoir proceeded slowly. However, as it is a U.S. National Historic Landmark, Federal Emergency Management Agency (FEMA) officials approved Federal support for the repair and rebuilding of the Beauvoir complex.

With various federal, state, and private organizations' financial assistance and individual contributions, restoring Beauvoir Mansion started in early 2006. On June 3, 2008, Jefferson Davis' 200th Birthday, Beauvoir Mansion was fully restored and reopened for public tours. The mansion was restored to its original condition when Jefferson and Varina Davis lived there.

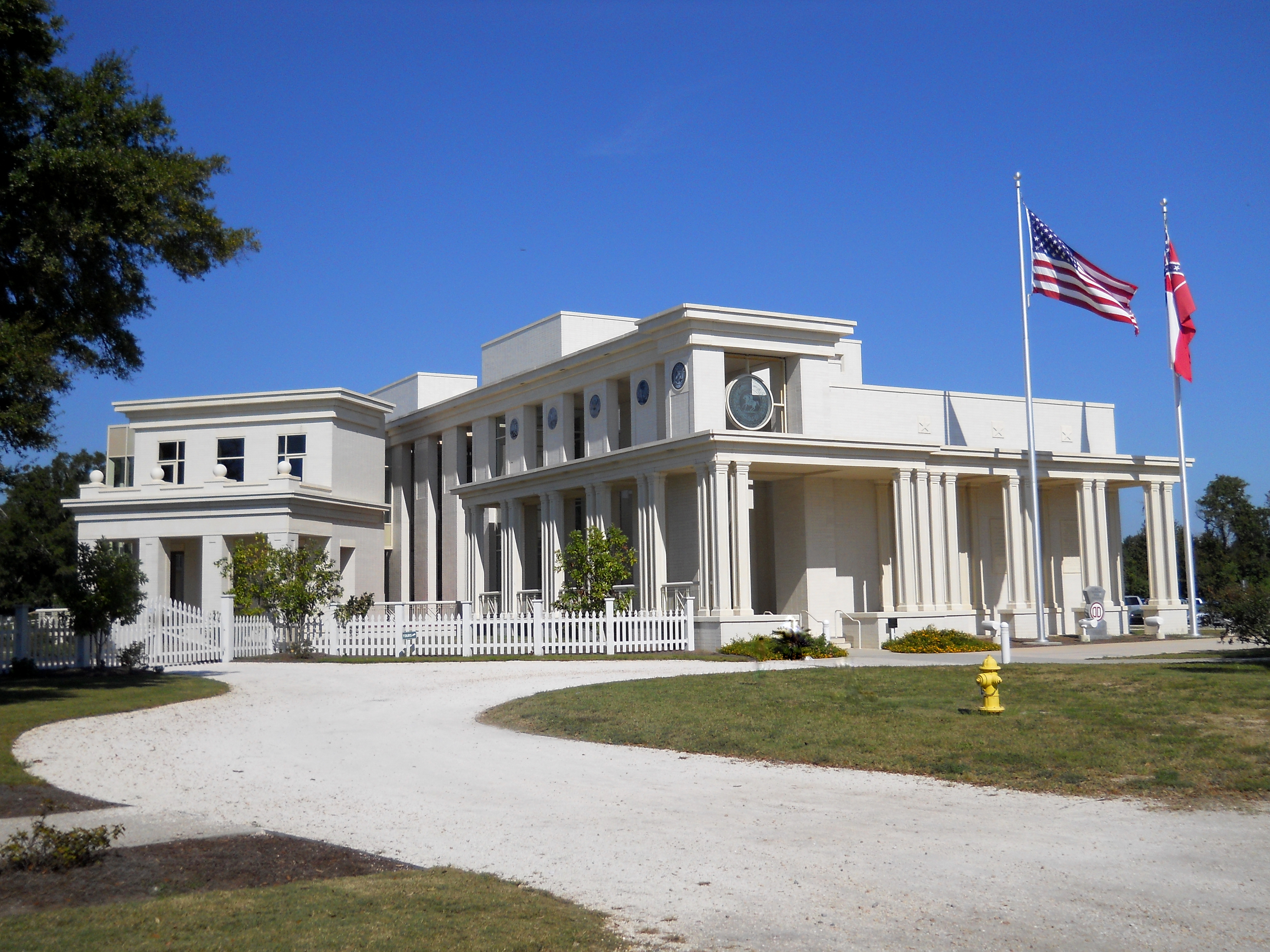
Jefferson Davis Presidential Library & Museum in 2014

In the winter of 2009, Davis's library and Hayes's cottage were rebuilt and open for public tours.

The Jefferson Davis Presidential Library and Museum opened in June 2013. Many artifacts were recovered and were restored or repaired from the damage caused by Hurricane Katrina.

In addition to the Presidential Library, the historic kitchen behind the Beauvoir mansion was reconstructed.

Funding for the renovation included $17.2 million from state and federal sources.

==== Restoration – collections ====
About 60% of the collections are estimated to be salvageable. Before Katrina, the Jefferson Davis Presidential Library maintained a collection of 12,000 books on United States history, southern history, and history of the American Civil War. The library also maintained collections of photographs, personal letters, manuscripts, envelopes, postcards, newspaper clippings, records of Confederate heritage organizations such as the United Confederate Veterans and the Sons of Confederate Veterans, and records from the veterans home that once was present on the grounds. Most of these records survived except those on display in the two museums.

Civilian volunteers and the Mississippi Army National Guard assisted with salvage. Unfortunately, the room storing much of the authentic china and artifacts was adjacent to the gift shop, with replicas of the originals. Both rooms were destroyed, so sifting through the debris and identifying the genuine relics was very difficult.

== Today ==
Beauvoir is owned and operated by the Mississippi Division of Sons of Confederate Veterans. Smithsonian magazine reported in 2018 that the museum communicates the Lost Cause perspective, including characterizing slavery as a positive institution and minor factor in the Civil War. It also reports that the State of Mississippi gives an annual grant of $100,000 (~$122,671 in 2024) for maintenance.

=== Activities ===
Before the destruction wrought by Hurricane Katrina, annual events included the Spring Pilgrimage in March, Confederate Memorial Day in April, the Fall Muster in October, and Candlelight Christmas in December. As of 2018, the Fall Muster is described as the "highlight" of the calendar.

Visitors to the site were presented with a biographical film on the life of Jefferson Davis narrated by an actor portraying Davis's long-time friend, Iowa Senator George Wallace Jones.

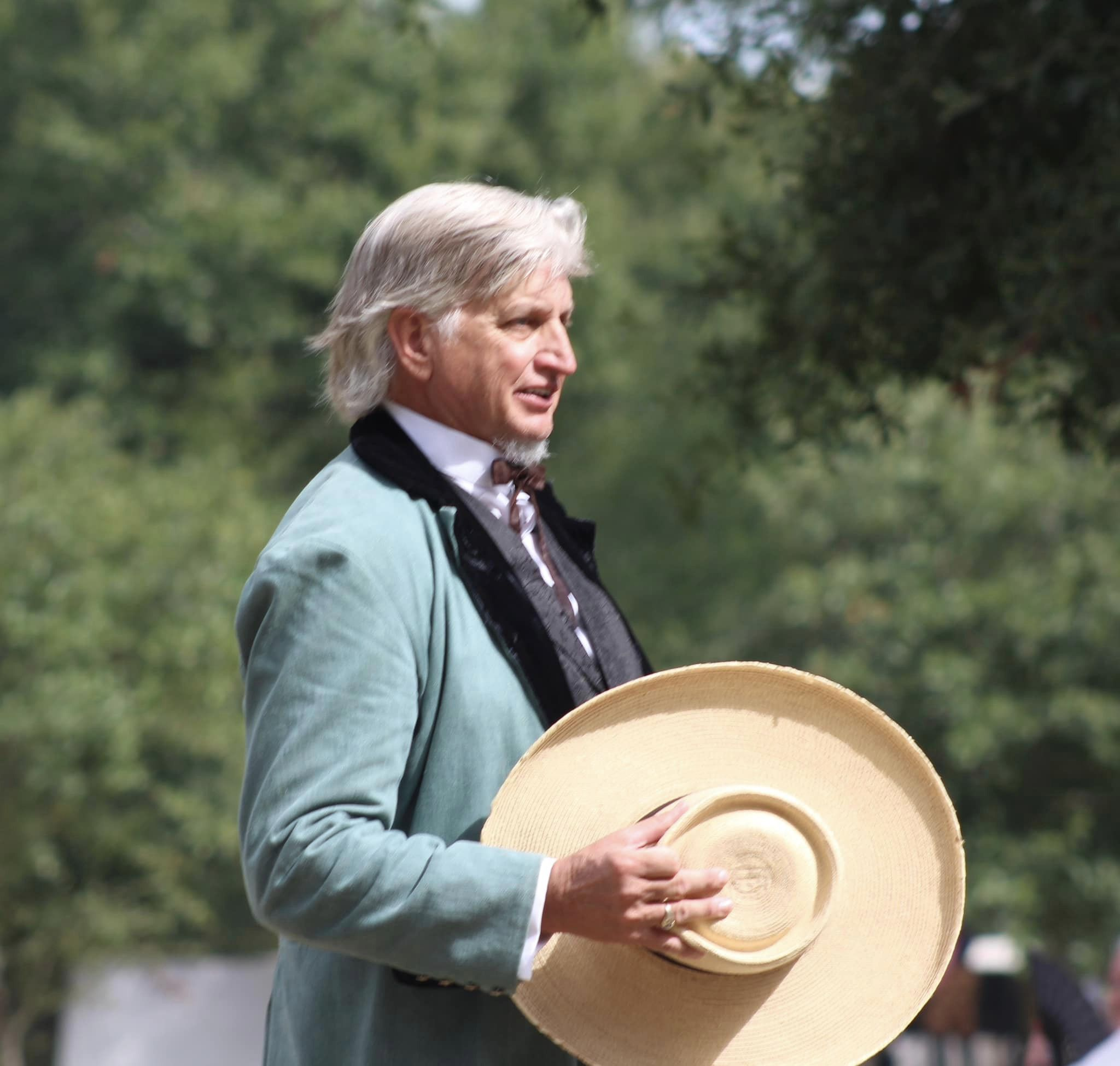
President Jefferson Davis ahead of the reenactment

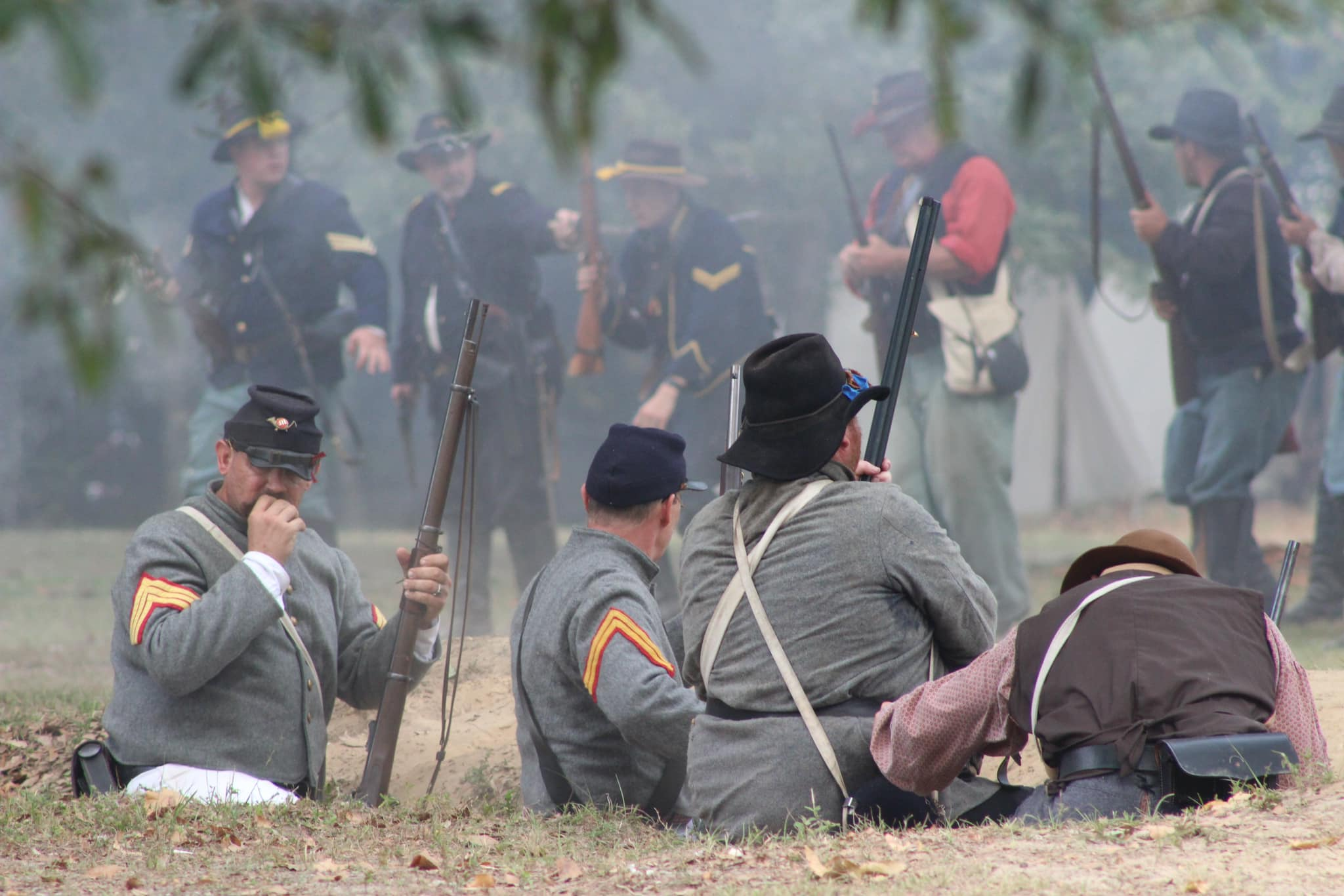
Confederate Marines in a trench

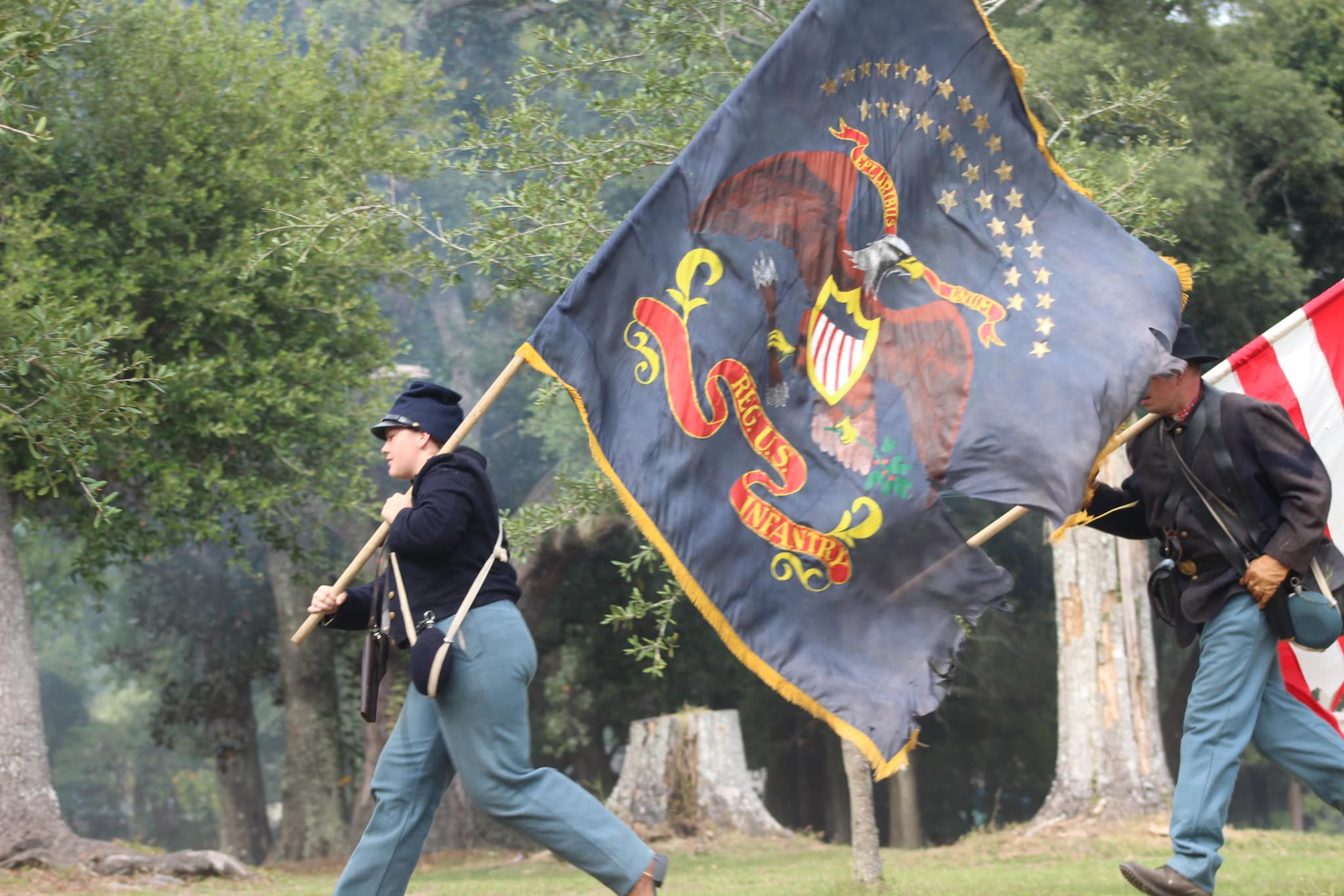
Union flag boy running with regimental colors

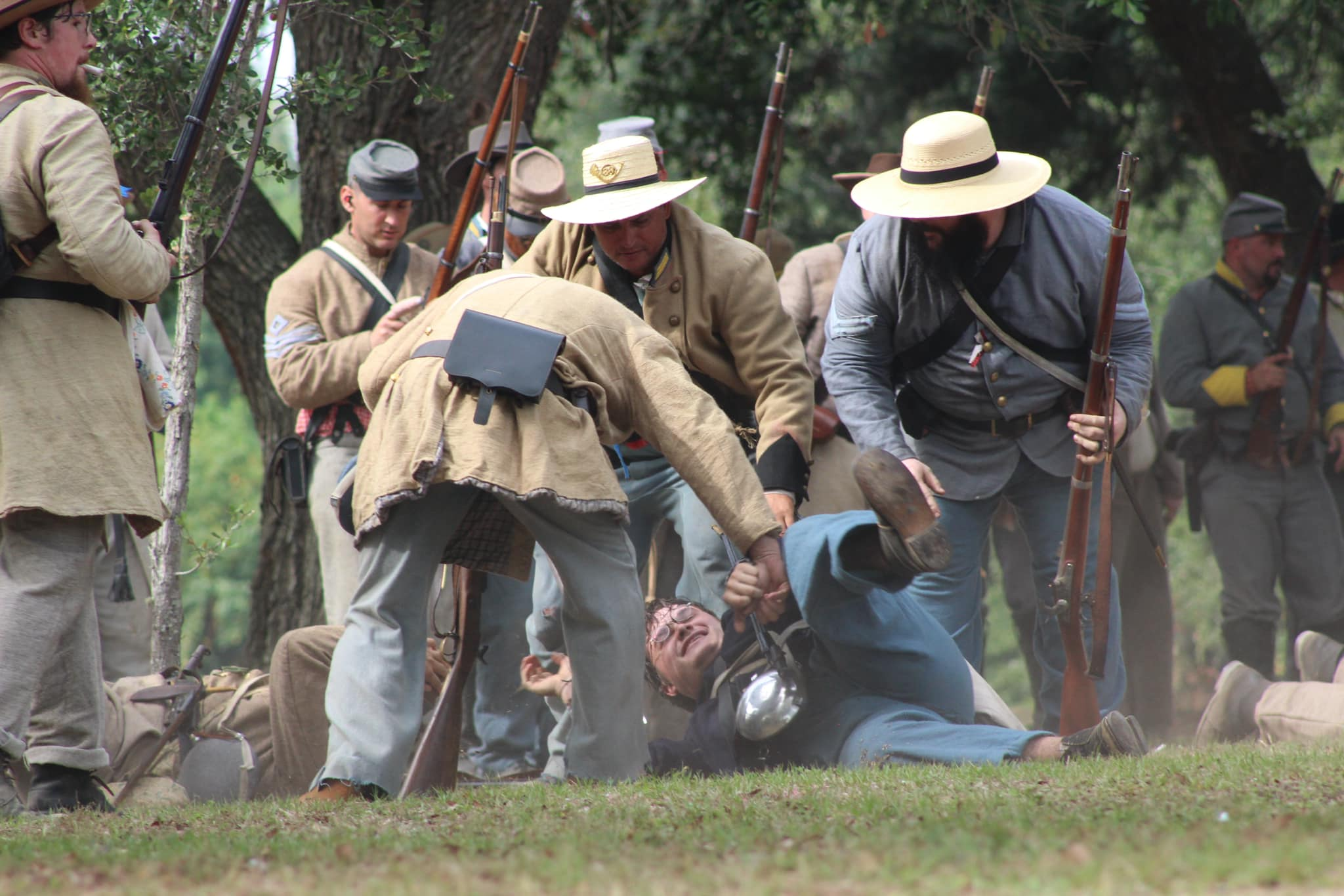
Union soldier being attacked by Confederate soldiers

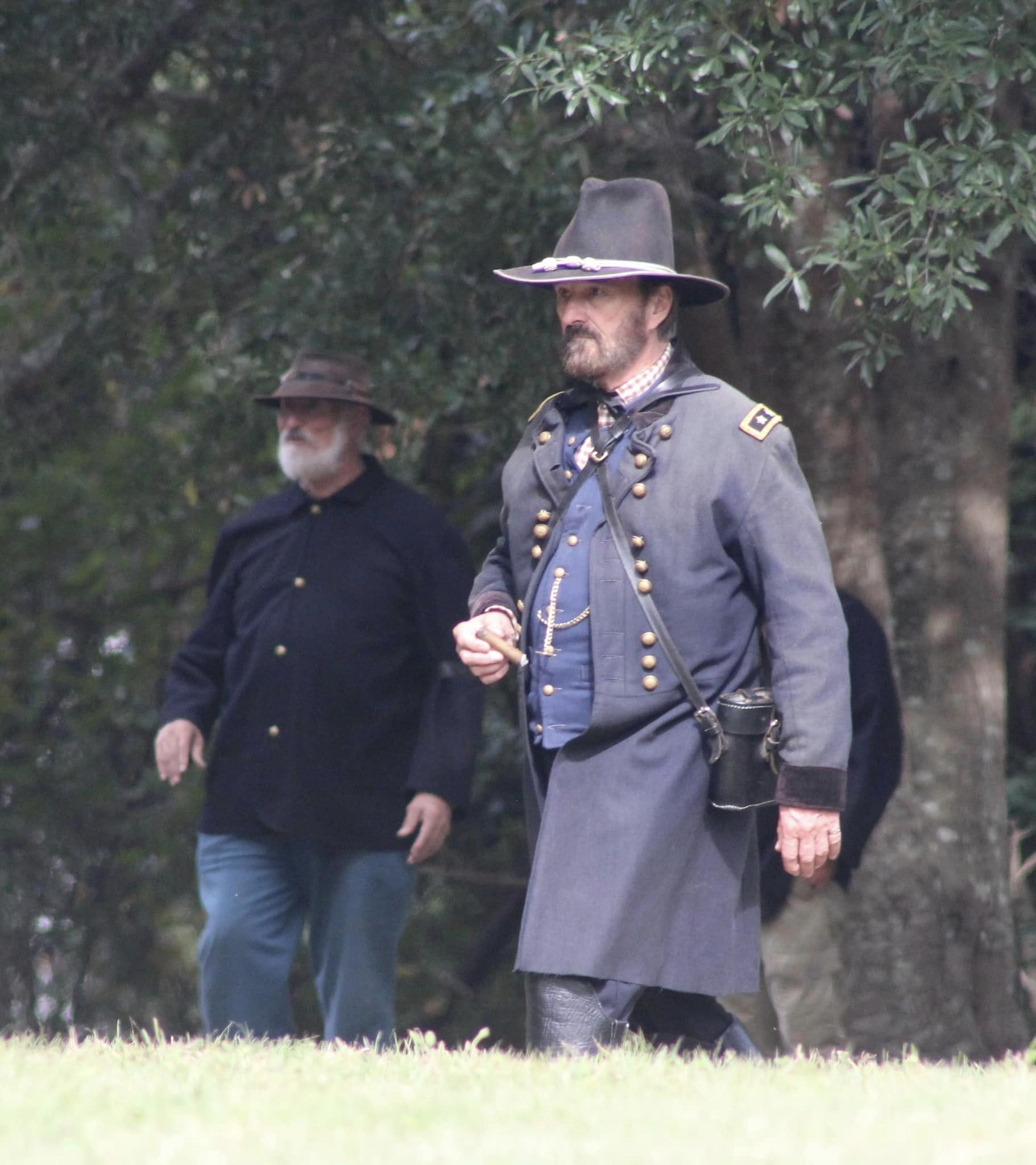
General Ulysses S. Grant

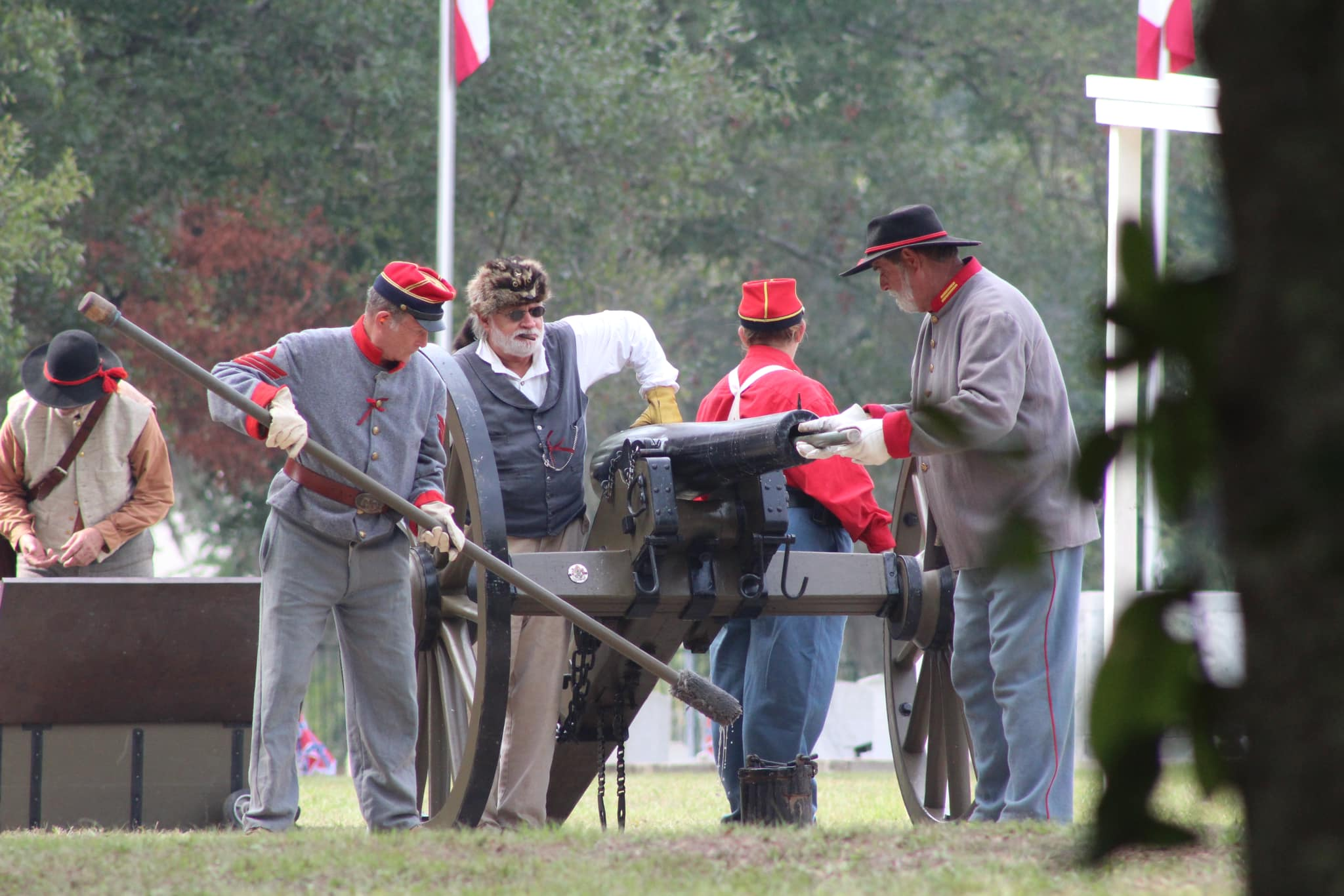
Confederate soldiers loading a cannon

Fall Muster battle reenactment, October 2023

== Designations ==
The home and grounds are listed on the National Register of Historic Places. Beauvoir was also designated as a National Historic Landmark and a Mississippi Historical Landmark.
