= William Beckwith (sculptor) =

American sculptor

William Norwood Beckwith
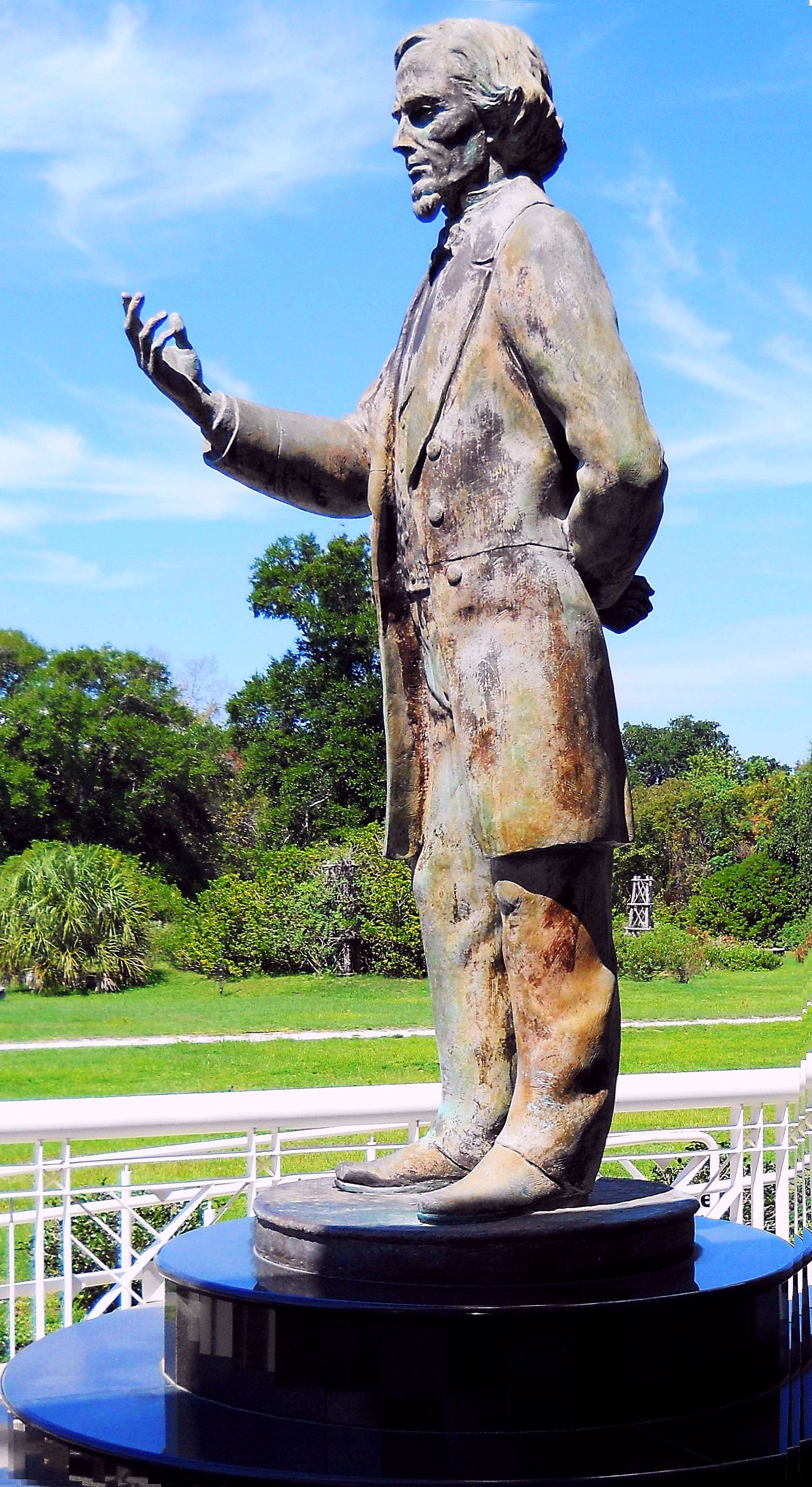
- Beckwith's statue of Jefferson Davis at the Jefferson Davis Presidential Library and Museum
- Born: 1952; Greenwood, Mississippi
- Education: BFA and MFA, University of Mississippi
- Occupation: Sculptor
- Known for: Bronze sculptures
- Spouse: Jackie
- Children: one son (Clay)

William (Bill) Norwood Beckwith (born 1952) is an American sculptor and educator. He is credited with having built the first commercial fine arts bronze foundry in Mississippi.

== Early life and education ==
Beckwith was born in Greenville, Mississippi and was educated in the Greenville public schools. For 4 years, beginning in 1966 at age 14, Beckwith served as an apprentice of Leon Koury – a sculptor who was Director of Delta Art Center in Greenville and who had studied under Malvina Hoffman.

Between 1970 and 1974, Beckwith attended the University of Mississippi where he obtained BFA and MFA degrees in sculpture. In 1974, as part of his university thesis, Beckwith built a foundry – Vulcan Studios and Foundry – next to Koury's art studio in Greenville. From 1974 to 1976, Beckwith held a graduate teaching assistantship in sculpture at the University of Mississippi.

== Career ==
In 1976, Beckwith and artist Wallace Mallette established the first commercial fine arts bronze foundry in Mississippi. Beckwith was able to finance his art projects by casting for other sculptors at his Vulcan foundry.

Around 1982, Beckwith and his wife relocated to Taylor, Mississippi – a small artist community about 8 miles (13 km) southwest of Oxford, Mississippi. During this time, Beckwith continued to operate his foundry in Greenville. By 1986, Beckwith had ceased casting for other sculptors to concentrate on his own artistic work at his studio in Taylor.

For 18 years, Beckwith taught courses in figure drawing, sculpture, and 3-D design at the University of Mississippi. In 2014, he retired from teaching.

== Select bronze sculptures ==
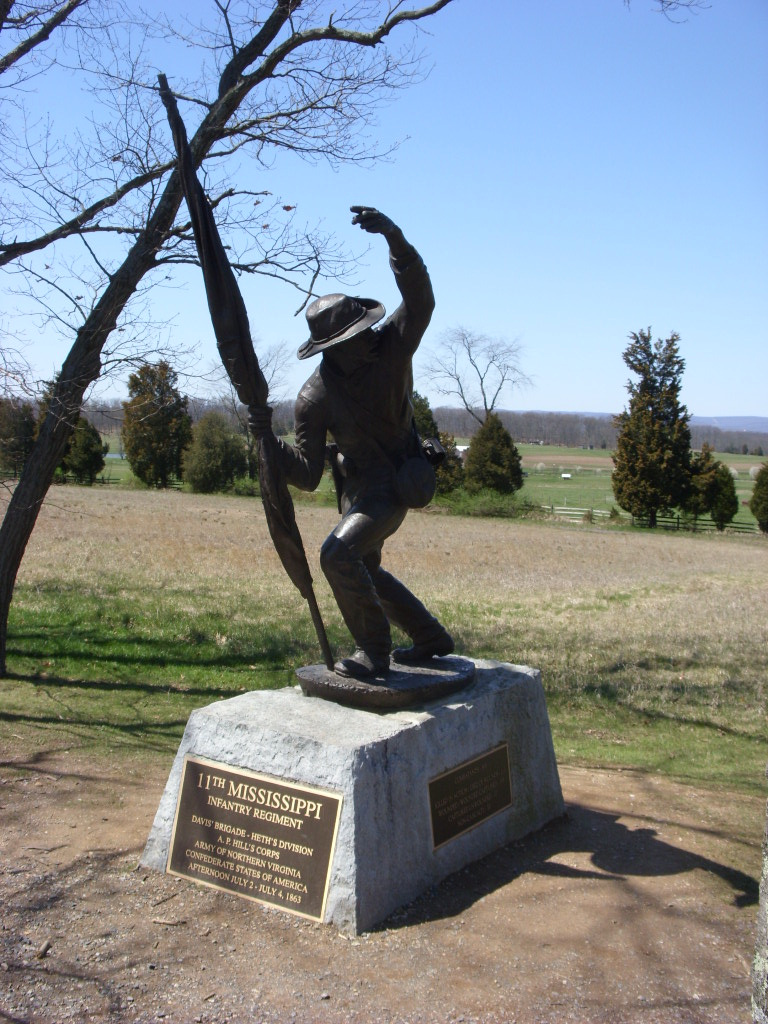
11th Mississippi Infantry Monument

- Jefferson Davis statue at the Jefferson Davis Presidential Library and Museum in Biloxi, Mississippi
- B.B. King statue in Indianola, Mississippi
- Chief Piomingo statue in Tupelo, Mississippi
- Flagbearer for the Mississippi 11th at Gettysburg National Military Park
- George E. Merrick statue in Coral Gables, Florida
- Elvis Presley statue in Tupelo, Mississippi
- William Faulkner statue in Oxford, Mississippi
- L.Q.C. Lamar statue in Oxford, Mississippi

In addition to life-size sculptures, Beckwith is also known for his portrait busts of historical figures:

- Tennessee Williams – American playwright
- Eudora Welty – American novelist
- Herman Melville – American novelist
- Bill Waller – Governor of Mississippi
- Jim Henson – American puppeteer

== Select exhibitions ==
- 1984 Louisiana World Exposition in New Orleans
- Splashlight Studio in New York
- Frank Marino Gallery in New York
- Mississippi Museum of Art in Jackson.
- National Museum of American Art, Smithsonian Institution, in Washington, D.C.

== Awards ==
- 1989 Artist's Fellowship from Mississippi Arts Commission
- 2001 Governor's Award of Excellence in the Arts
- Lifetime achievement award from the E.E. Bass Cultural Center in Greenville, Mississippi
- 2014 Mississippi Institute of Arts and Letters Noel Polk Lifetime Achievement Award
