= R. O. Reynolds =

American lawyer, army officer and politician

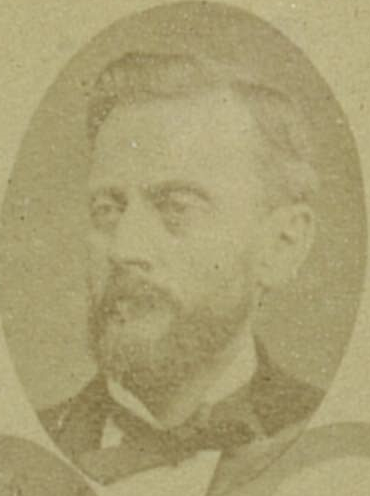
Reuben Oscar Reynolds (circa 1884)

Reuben Oscar Reynolds (October 9, 1832 – September 4, 1887) was a lawyer and state senator in Mississippi. He represented Monroe County and Chickasaw County in the Mississippi Senate for several terms during and after the Reconstruction era ended.

== Early life ==
He was born October 9, 1832, in Columbia County, Georgia, to Reuben Young and Jane A. Pinkard Smith Reynolds. He then moved with his parents to Monroe County, Mississippi, while still young. He went to college in Alabama, before going to the University of Georgia to graduate and then onto the University of Virginia School of Law to obtain his Bachelor of Laws.

He first married Mary (Mollie) Branch English on February 20, 1855, but she died just over two years later on March 5, 1857. He later married Sarah Banks Young in 1865 with whom he had six children: George, Reuben (Ruben) Oscar, Hamelton, Janie, Beverly and Sallie.

== Career ==
After returning to Aberdeen, Mississippi, he started to practice law with William G. Henderson, and was one of the first lawyers in the state. He wrote the Report of Cases Argued and Determined in the High Court of Errors and Appeals for the State of Mississippi.

He signed up early to serve with the Confederate States Army in the American Civil War enlisting as a Captain. He served in Joseph R. Davis’s Brigade as a commanding officer in the 11th Mississippi Infantry Regiment. He was wounded four times during his service and the final injury was on March 25, 1865, during his last battle in Petersburg, Virginia, causing his right arm to be amputated and he was captured whilst recovering. He was promoted to colonel after the injury at Gaines Mill.

In 1866 he served as the reporter for the Mississippi Supreme Court.

In 1875 Colonel Reynolds said "Whoever eats the white man's meat must vote with the white man or refrain from voting" to much applause. He testified as a witness for persons accused of being party to Ku Kkux Klan activity.

He served in the Mississippi Senate from 1876 continuously until his death in 1887. He was elected and served as president pro tempore of the Mississippi Senate first in the 1878 session and then again for each following session.

During his career he was also involved with: The Aberdeen Federal Court, The Canton, Aberdeen and Nashville Railroad, The Kansas City, Memphis and Birmingham Railroad, The Aberdeen and Muldon Railroad, The State Bar Association and the Aberdeen's Presbyterian Church.

== Death ==
He died September 4, 1887, at his home in Aberdeen, Mississippi, from dropsy of the heart after being bed bound for two months. He was survived by his second wife and all six children. In February 1888 a memorial was held in the Senate chamber and several senators made addresses honoring Reynolds.

== Notes ==
The University of Alabama Libraries Special Collections has a collection of documents dating from 1861 to 1887, including his military service in the Eleventh Mississippi Infantry Regiment.
