= 11th Mississippi Infantry Monument =

11th Mississippi Infantry Statue
- United States
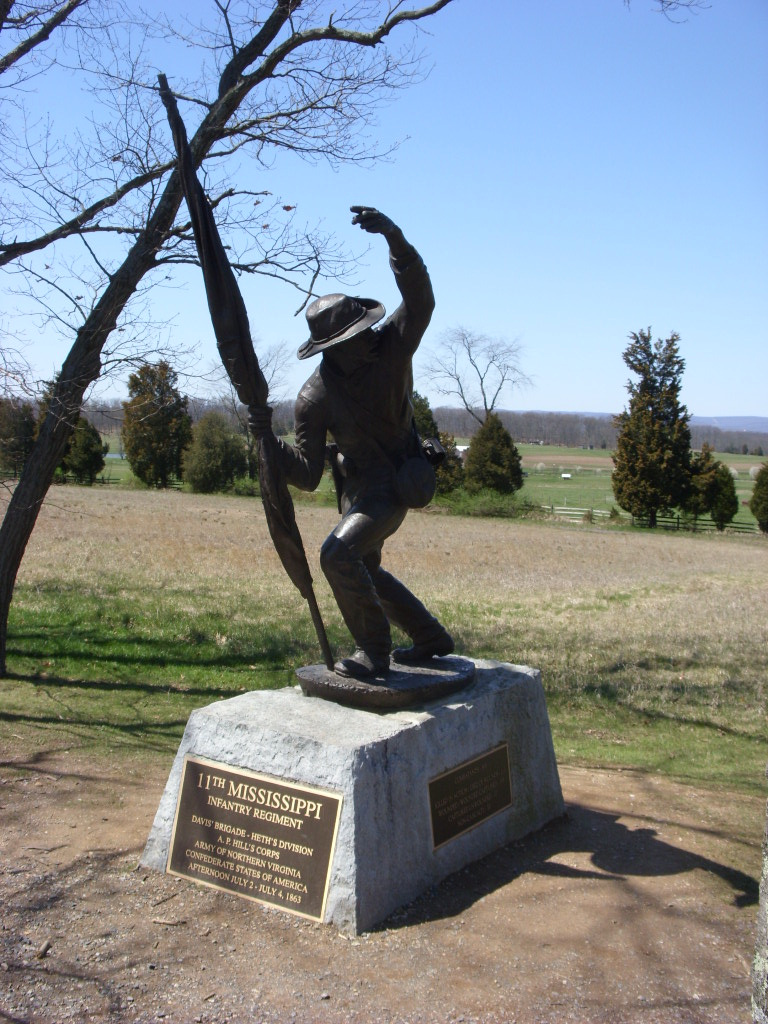
- For 11th Mississippi Infantry
- Location: 39.819641°N 77.247065°W; Gettysburg NMP; Gettysburg
- Commemorated: 2000 (Bill Beckwith)

The 11th Mississippi Infantry Statue is a Gettysburg Battlefield memorial commemorating a Confederate regiment with a bronze sculpture of a flagbearer of the 11th Mississippi Infantry Regiment.

== History ==
The 2nd South Carolina String Band performed at the dedication.
