= William Faulkner bibliography =

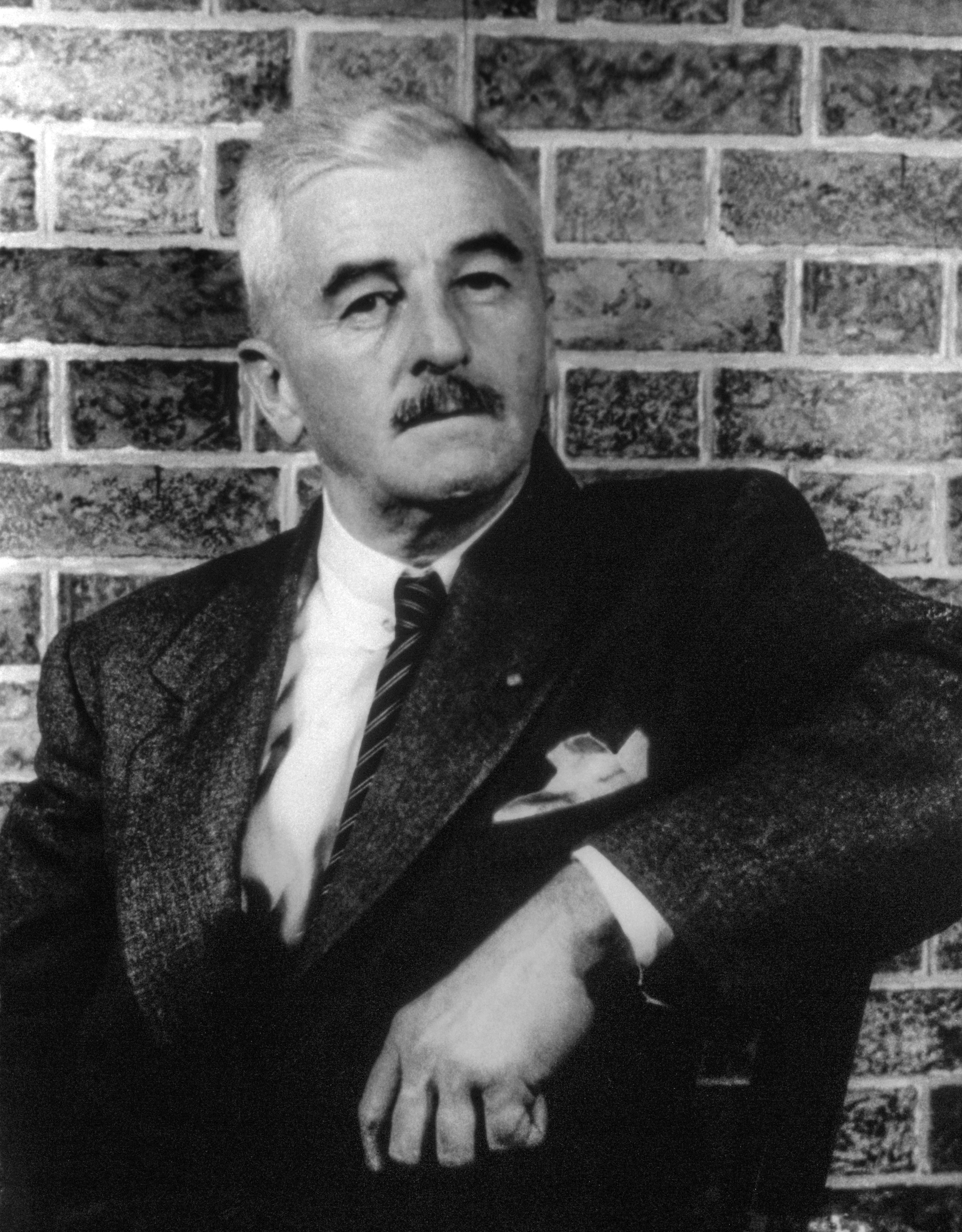
William Faulkner in 1954

William Faulkner (1897–1962) was an American writer known for his Southern Gothic novels and short stories set in the fictional Yoknapatawpha County, based on his hometown of Oxford in Lafayette County, Mississippi. He is widely considered the preeminent writer of Southern literature and among the most significant figures in American literature. In 1949, he was awarded the Nobel Prize in Literature for "his powerful and artistically unique contribution to the modern American novel".

In 1919, as a student at the University of Mississippi, Faulkner published his first work, the poem "L'Après-midi d'un Faune", in The New Republic. While living in New Orleans in 1925, he published over a dozen short stories collectively known as the "New Orleans Sketches". Faulkner's first novels—Soldiers' Pay (1926) and Mosquitoes (1927)—were not successful, and his third, Flags in the Dust, was rejected by publishers before its publication as the abridged Sartoris (1929). Convinced that he "would never be published again", Faulkner wrote the experimental and deeply personal The Sound and the Fury. Written in stream of consciousness, the novel was published in 1929 with few sales due to the onset of the Great Depression. It is now considered among his greatest works.

Faulkner expanded on his stream of consciousness approach in As I Lay Dying, which is narrated by 15 characters bringing a mother to her grave in Yoknapatawpha. Aspiring to create a commercial work, Faulkner wrote the sensationalist Sanctuary (1931). Although its violence and sexuality were controversial, the novel was immensely successful and brought new attention to his previous works. Subsequent novels in that decade—namely Light in August (1932) and Absalom, Absalom! (1936)—are regarded as among his best and have both been hailed as the "Great American Novel". His 1940 novel The Hamlet launched the Snopes trilogy, completed by The Town (1957) and The Mansion (1959). Faulkner's 1954 novel A Fable, which follows a Christ-like corporal in World War I, won the Pulitzer Prize and the National Book Award. He published his 19th and final novel, The Reivers, in 1962, the year he died. The work garnered him a second Pulitzer posthumously.

Beyond his novels, Faulkner was a prolific short story writer. In addition to short story collections, two novels—The Unvanquished (1938) and Go Down, Moses (1942)—consist of interrelated short stories. In 1932, director Howard Hawks, impressed by his work, invited Faulkner to California to adapt his short story "Turn About" into the film Today We Live (1933). Until 1954, Faulkner split his time between Oxford and Hollywood, working as a screenwriter on some 50 film projects and becoming a frequent collaborator and close friend of Hawks. Some screenplay contributions, such as those to Gunga Din (1939), were uncredited, and many of his scripts were never produced. In addition to several speeches, book reviews, and book introductions, Faulkner also wrote essays on topics ranging from Albert Camus to Japan.

== Prose fiction ==
=== Novels ===
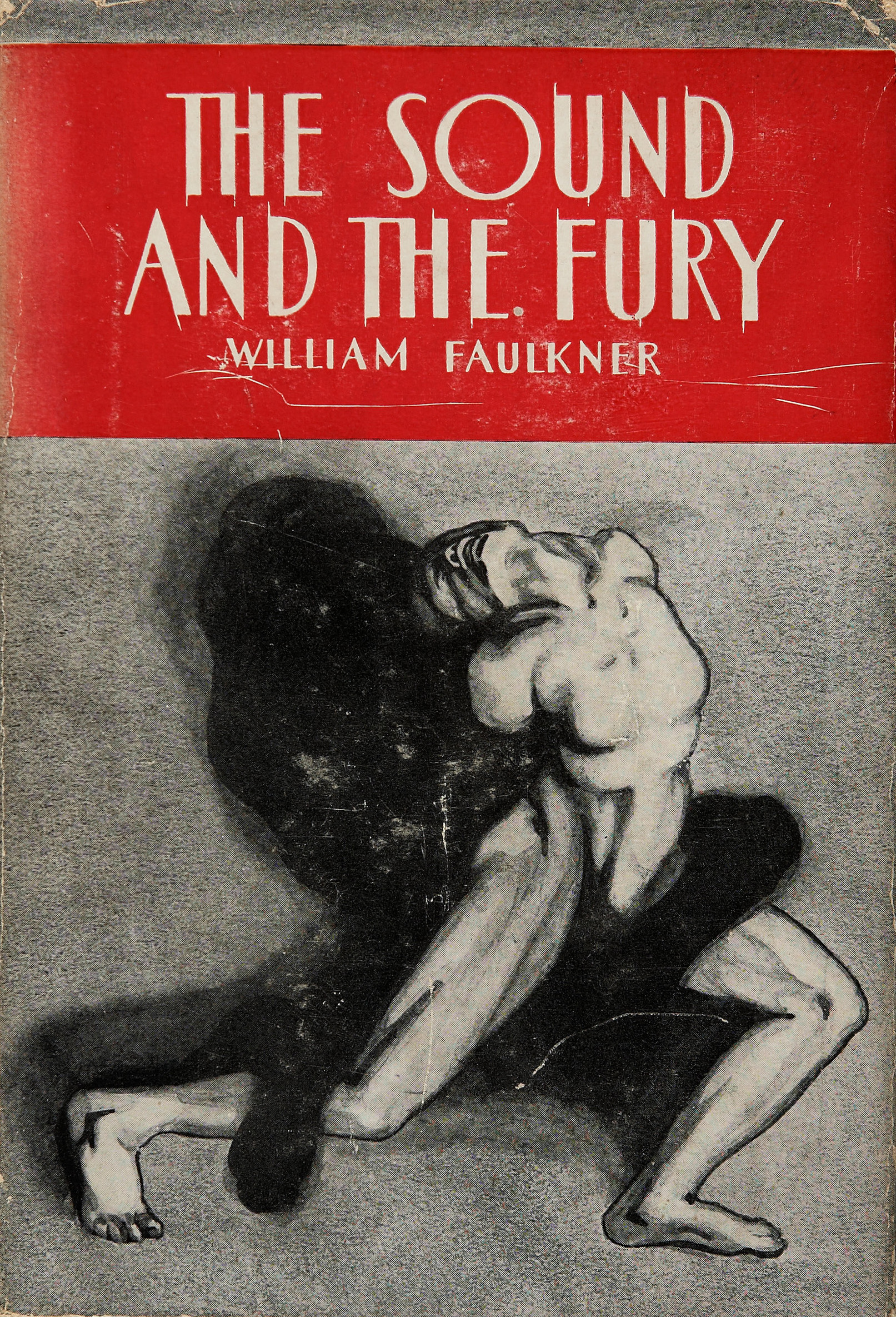
The Sound and the Fury (1929) cover

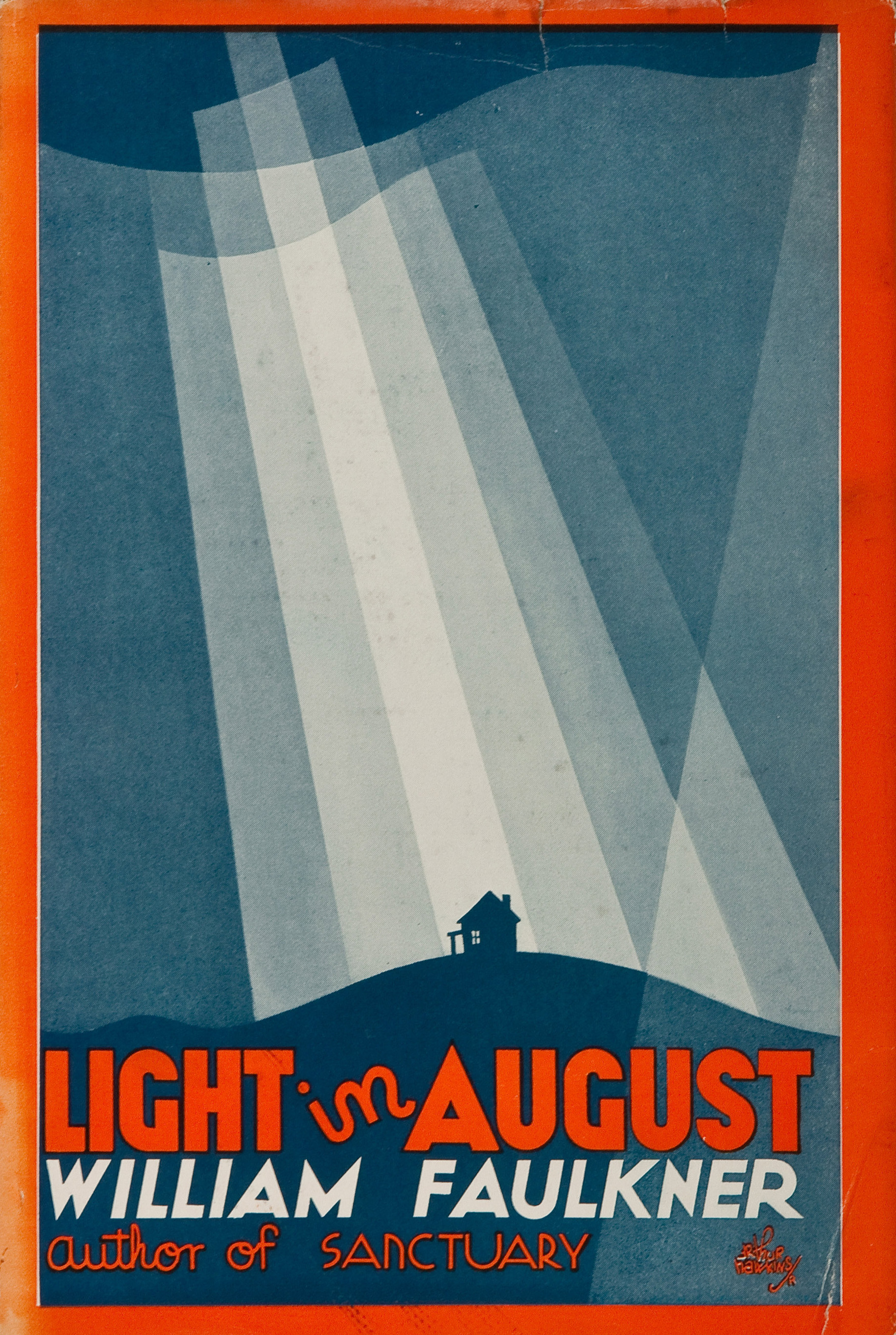
Light in August (1932) cover

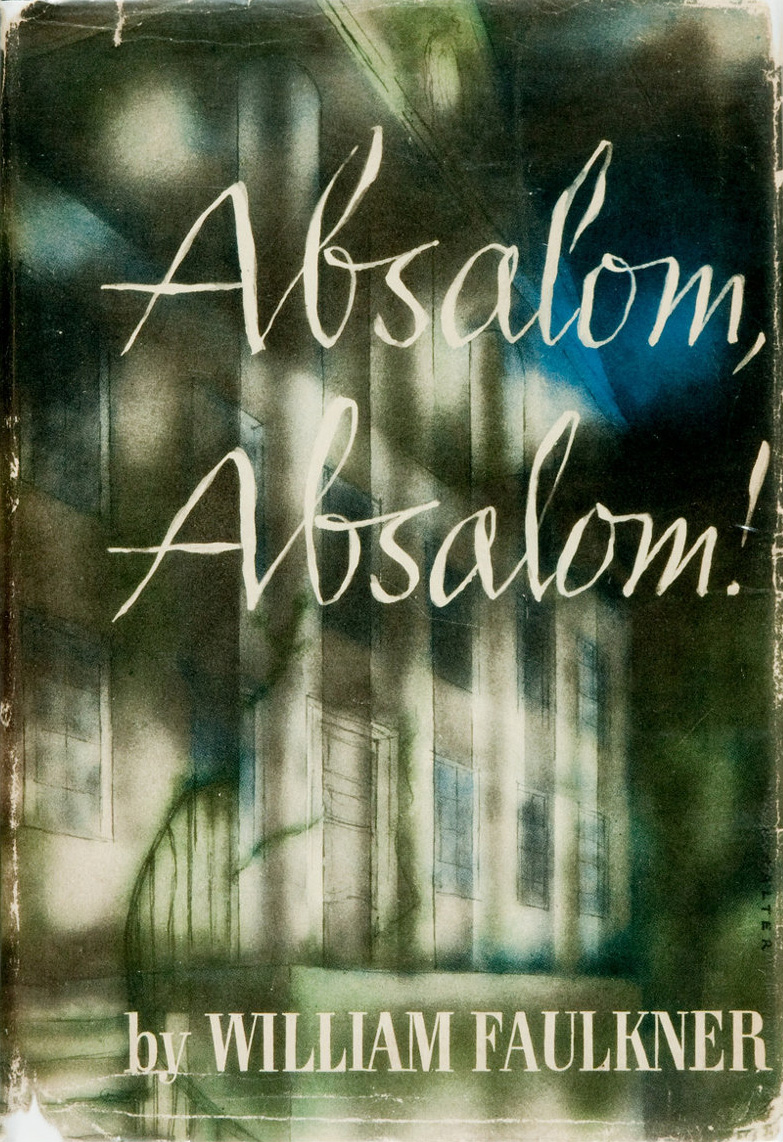
Absalom, Absalom! (1936) cover

Novels by William Faulkner
Year	Title	Publisher	Notes	Ref.
1926	Soldiers' Pay	Boni & Liveright	Faulkner's debut novel	
1927	Mosquitoes	Boni & Liveright	Set on Lake Pontchartrain, features Faulkner himself in a cameo	
1929	Sartoris	Harcourt, Brace	An abridged version of Flags in the Dust. The original manuscript was published posthumously by Random House in 1973.	
1929	The Sound and the Fury	Jonathan Cape & Harrison Smith	First appearance of the Compson family. Faulkner wrote an appendix to the novel, "Compson 1699–1945", for The Portable Faulkner (1946).	
1930	As I Lay Dying	Jonathan Cape & Harrison Smith		
1931	Sanctuary	Jonathan Cape & Harrison Smith		
1932	Light in August	Harrison Smith & Robert Haas		
1935	Pylon	Harrison Smith & Robert Haas	Not set in Yoknapatawpha County	
1936	Absalom, Absalom!	Random House	Second novel featuring Quentin Compson, after The Sound and the Fury	
1938	The Unvanquished	Random House	A collection of seven interrelated short stories, six of which are revisions of stories previously published in The Saturday Evening Post. "An Odor of Verbena" is original to The Unvanquished.	
1939	The Wild Palms	Random House	Two stories, not set in Yoknapatawpha County, intertwined in what Faulkner called "counterpoint" structure. His original title was If I Forget Thee, Jerusalem.	
1940	The Hamlet	Random House	The first book in Faulkner's Snopes trilogy	
1942	Go Down, Moses	Random House	Consisting of interrelated short stories about the McCaslin family, Faulkner regarded it as a novel.	
1948	Intruder in the Dust	Random House	Shares characters like Gavin Stevens and Lucas Beauchamp with Go Down Moses	
1951	Requiem for a Nun	Random House	Sequel to Sanctuary, written as a play with prose parts preceding each act	
1954	A Fable	Random House	Not set in Yoknapatawpha County, winner of the Pulitzer Prize for Fiction and the National Book Award in 1955	
1957	The Town	Random House	The second book in the Snopes trilogy	
1959	The Mansion	Random House	The third book in the Snopes trilogy	
1962	The Reivers	Random House	Winner of the Pulitzer Prize for Fiction in 1963	
1973	Flags in the Dust	Random House	Original manuscript of what became Sartoris, prior to extensive editing	

=== Short stories ===
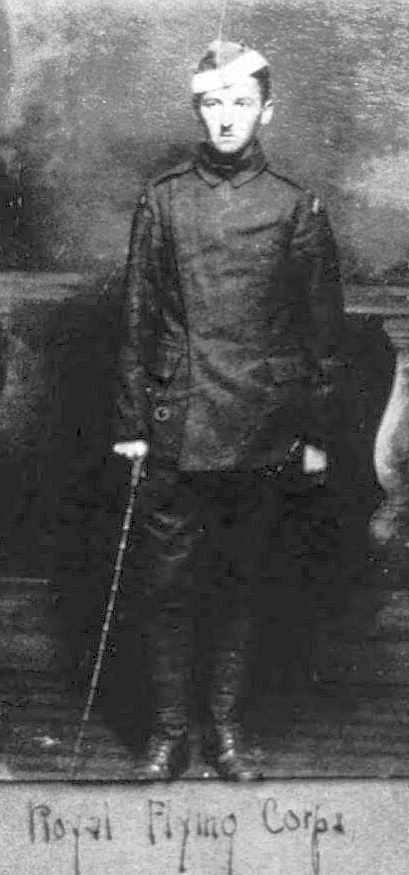
Faulkner as a cadet in the Royal Canadian Air Force, 1918

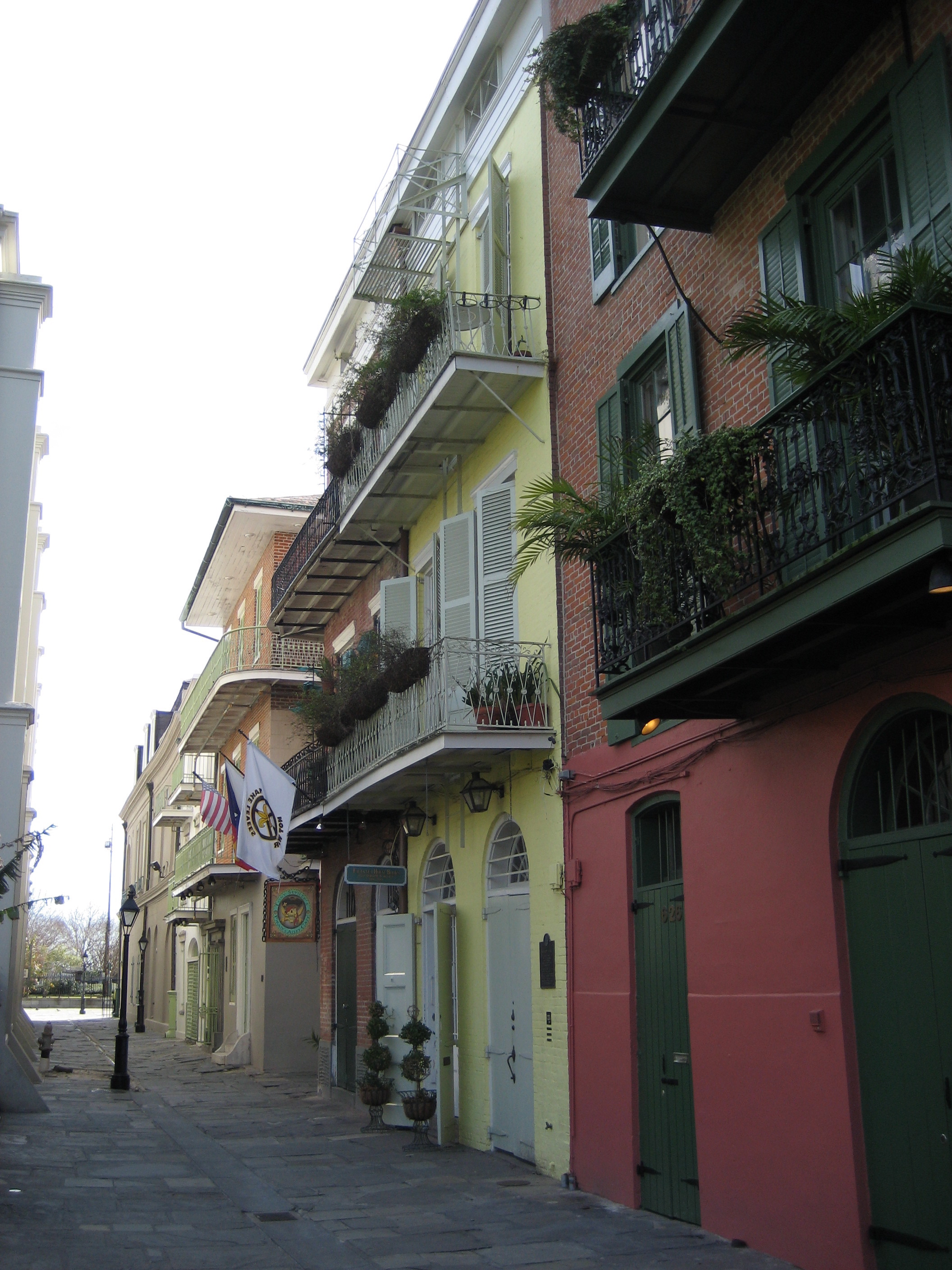
During his time in New Orleans, Faulkner lived in a house in the French Quarter (pictured center yellow), where he wrote the "New Orleans Sketches".

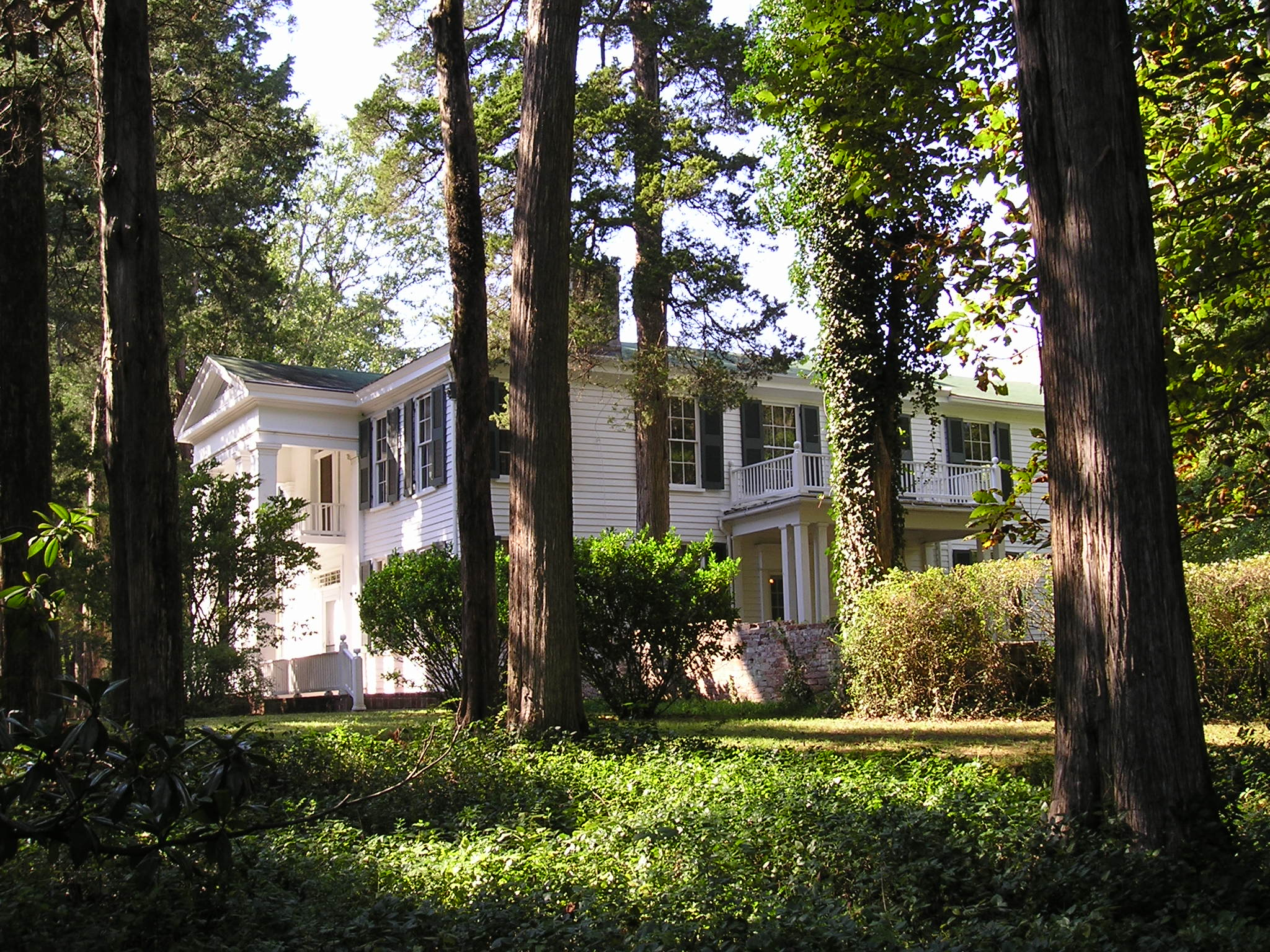
Faulkner's home, Rowan Oak

Short stories by William Faulkner
Year	Title	First published in	Collected in	Notes	Ref.
1919	"Landing in Luck"	The Mississippian	Early Prose and Poetry		
1922	"The Hill"	The Mississippian	Early Prose and Poetry		
1922	"Nympholepsy"	The Mississippian	Uncollected Stories of William Faulkner		
1925	"New Orleans"	The Double Dealer	New Orleans Sketches	The name "New Orleans Sketches" applies to several sketches published in the same issue of The Double Dealer.	
1925	"Frankie and Johnny"	Mississippi Quarterly	Uncollected Stories of William Faulkner	One of the previous New Orleans Sketches; later rewritten as "The Kid Learns"	
1925	"Chartres Street"	The Times-Picayune	New Orleans Sketches		
1925	"Damon and Pythias Unlimited"	The Times-Picayune	New Orleans Sketches		
1925	"Home"	The Times-Picayune	New Orleans Sketches		
1925	"Jealousy"	The Times-Picayune	New Orleans Sketches		
1925	"Cheest"	The Times-Picayune	New Orleans Sketches		
1925	"Out of Nazareth"	The Times-Picayune	New Orleans Sketches		
1925	"The Kingdom of God"	The Times-Picayune	New Orleans Sketches		
1925	"The Rosary"	The Times-Picayune	New Orleans Sketches		
1925	"The Cobbler"	The Times-Picayune	New Orleans Sketches		
1925	"Chance"	The Times-Picayune	New Orleans Sketches		
1925	"Sunset"	The Times-Picayune	New Orleans Sketches		
1925	"The Kid Learns"	The Times-Picayune	New Orleans Sketches		
1925	"Liar"	The Times-Picayune	New Orleans Sketches		
1925	"Episode"	The Times-Picayune	New Orleans Sketches		
1925	"Country Mice"	The Times-Picayune	New Orleans Sketches		
1925	"Yo Ho and Two Bottles of Rum"	The Times-Picayune	New Orleans Sketches		
1930	"A Rose for Emily"	The Forum	These 13; The Portable Faulkner; The Collected Stories of William Faulkner		
1930	"Honor"	The American Mercury	Dr. Martino and Other Stories; The Collected Stories of William Faulkner		
1930	"Thrift"	The Saturday Evening Post	Uncollected Stories of William Faulkner		
1930	"Red Leaves"	The Saturday Evening Post	These 13; The Portable Faulkner; The Collected Stories of William Faulkner		
1931	"Dry September"	Scribner's Magazine	These 13; The Collected Stories of William Faulkner		
1931	"That Evening Sun"	The American Mercury	These 13; The Portable Faulkner; The Collected Stories of William Faulkner		
1931	"Ad Astra"	American Caravan	These 13; The Portable Faulkner; The Collected Stories of William Faulkner		
1931	"Hair"	The American Mercury	These 13; The Collected Stories of William Faulkner		
1931	"Spotted Horses"	Scribner's Magazine	The Portable Faulkner; Uncollected Stories of William Faulkner	Later revised and incorporated into the novel The Hamlet	
1931	"The Hound"	Scribner's Magazine	Dr. Martino and Other Stories; Uncollected Stories of William Faulkner	Later revised and incorporated into the novel The Hamlet	
1931	"Fox Hunt"	Harper's Magazine	Dr. Martino and Other Stories; The Collected Stories of William Faulkner		
1931	"Victory"	—	These 13; The Collected Stories of William Faulkner		
1931	"All the Dead Pilots"	—	These 13; The Collected Stories of William Faulkner		
1931	"Crevasse"	—	These 13; The Collected Stories of William Faulkner		
1931	"A Justice"	—	These 13; The Collected Stories of William Faulkner		
1931	"Mistral"	—	These 13; The Collected Stories of William Faulkner		
1931	"Divorce in Naples"	—	These 13; The Collected Stories of William Faulkner		
1931	"Carcassonne"	—	These 13; The Collected Stories of William Faulkner		
1931	"Dr. Martino"	—	Dr. Martino and Other Stories; The Collected Stories of William Faulkner		
1931	"Idyll in the Desert"	Random House	Uncollected Stories of William Faulkner	Published in a limited edition run of 400 copies	
1932	"Miss Zilphia Gant"	Book Club of Texas	Uncollected Stories of William Faulkner	Published in a print run of 300 copies	
1932	"Death Drag"	Scribner's Magazine	Dr. Martino and Other Stories; The Portable Faulkner; The Collected Stories of William Faulkner		
1932	"Centaur in Brass"	The American Mercury	The Collected Stories of William Faulkner		
1932	"Once Aboard the Lugger (I)"	Contempo	Uncollected Stories of William Faulkner		
1932	"Lizards in Jamshyd's Courtyard"	The Saturday Evening Post	Uncollected Stories of William Faulkner	Later revised and incorporated into the novel The Hamlet	
1932	"Turn About"	The Saturday Evening Post	Dr. Martino and Other Stories; The Collected Stories of William Faulkner		
1932	"Smoke"	Harper's Magazine	Dr. Martino and Other Stories; Knight's Gambit		
1932	"Mountain Victory"	The Saturday Evening Post	Dr. Martino and Other Stories; The Collected Stories of William Faulkner		
1933	"There Was a Queen"	Scribner's Magazine	Dr. Martino and Other Stories; The Collected Stories of William Faulkner		
1933	"Artist at Home"	Story	The Collected Stories of William Faulkner		
1933	"Beyond"	The Saturday Evening Post	Dr. Martino and Other Stories; The Collected Stories of William Faulkner		
1934	"Elly"	Story	Dr. Martino and Other Stories; The Collected Stories of William Faulkner		
1934	"Pennsylvania Station"	The American Mercury	The Collected Stories of William Faulkner		
1934	"Wash"	Harper's Magazine	Dr. Martino and Other Stories; The Portable Faulkner; The Collected Stories of William Faulkner		
1934	"A Bear Hunt"	The Saturday Evening Post	The Collected Stories of William Faulkner; Big Woods		
1934	"The Leg"	—	Dr. Martino and Other Stories; The Collected Stories of William Faulkner		
1934	"Black Music"	—	Dr. Martino and Other Stories; The Collected Stories of William Faulkner		
1934	"Mule in the Yard"	Scribner's Magazine	The Collected Stories of William Faulkner		
1934	"Ambuscade"	The Saturday Evening Post	Uncollected Stories of William Faulkner	Later revised and incorporated into the novel The Unvanquished	
1934	"Retreat"	The Saturday Evening Post	Uncollected Stories of William Faulkner		
1934	"Lo!"	Story	The Collected Stories of William Faulkner		
1934	"Raid"	The Saturday Evening Post	The Portable Faulkner; Uncollected Stories of William Faulkner	Later revised and incorporated into the novel The Unvanquished	
1935	"Skirmish at Sartoris"	Scribner's Magazine	Uncollected Stories of William Faulkner	Originally titled "Drusilla", renamed when it was revised and incorporated into the novel The Unvanquished	
1935	"Golden Land"	The American Mercury	The Collected Stories of William Faulkner		
1935	"That Will Be Fine"	The American Mercury	The Collected Stories of William Faulkner		
1935	"Uncle Willy"	The American Mercury	The Collected Stories of William Faulkner		
1935	"Lion"	Harper's Magazine	Uncollected Stories of William Faulkner	Later revised and incorporated into the novel Go Down, Moses	
1936	"The Brooch"	Scribner's Magazine	The Collected Stories of William Faulkner		
1936	"Two Dollar Wife"	College Life	Uncollected Stories of William Faulkner		
1936	"Fool About a Horse"	Scribner's Magazine	Uncollected Stories of William Faulkner	Later revised and incorporated into the novel The Hamlet	
1936	"The Unvanquished"	The Saturday Evening Post	Uncollected Stories of William Faulkner	Later revised and incorporated into the novel The Unvanquished as "Riposte in Tertio"	
1936	"Vendee"	The Saturday Evening Post	Uncollected Stories of William Faulkner	Later revised and incorporated into the novel The Unvanquished	
1937	"Monk"	Scribner's Magazine	Knight's Gambit		
1939	"Barn Burning"	Scribner's Magazine	The Collected Stories of William Faulkner	Later revised and incorporated into the novel The Hamlet	
1939	"Hand Upon the Waters"	The Saturday Evening Post	Knight's Gambit		
1940	"A Point of Law"	Collier's	Uncollected Stories of William Faulkner	Later revised and incorporated into the novel Go Down, Moses	
1940	"The Old People"	Harper's Magazine	Big Woods; Uncollected Stories of William Faulkner	Later revised and incorporated into the novel Go Down, Moses and included in Big Woods	
1940	"Pantaloon in Black"	Harper's Magazine	Uncollected Stories of William Faulkner	Later revised and incorporated into the novel Go Down, Moses	
1940	"Gold Is Not Always"	Atlantic Monthly	Uncollected Stories of William Faulkner		
1940	"Tomorrow"	The Saturday Evening Post	Knight's Gambit		
1941	"Go Down, Moses"	Collier's	Uncollected Stories of William Faulkner	Later revised and incorporated into the novel Go Down, Moses	
1941	"The Tall Men"	The Saturday Evening Post	The Collected Stories of William Faulkner		
1942	"Two Soldiers"	The Saturday Evening Post	The Collected Stories of William Faulkner		
1942	"Delta Autumn"	Story	The Portable Faulkner; Uncollected Stories of William Faulkner	Later revised and incorporated into the novel Go Down, Moses	
1942	"The Bear"	The Saturday Evening Post	The Portable Faulkner; Big Woods; Uncollected Stories of William Faulkner	Revised and incorporated into the novel Go Down, Moses and included in both The Portable Faulkner and Big Woods	
1943	"Afternoon of a Cow"	Fontaine	Uncollected Stories of William Faulkner	Later revised and incorporated into the novel The Hamlet; originally published in French	
1943	"Shingles for the Lord"	The Saturday Evening Post	The Collected Stories of William Faulkner		
1943	"My Grandmother Millard and General Bedford Forrest and the Battle of Harrykin Creek"	Story	The Collected Stories of William Faulkner		
1943	"Shall Not Perish"	Story	The Collected Stories of William Faulkner		
1946	"An Error in Chemistry"	Ellery Queen's Mystery Magazine	Knight's Gambit		
1948	"A Courtship"	Sewanee Review	The Collected Stories of William Faulkner		
1949	"Knight's Gambit"	—	Knight's Gambit	A shorter version remains unpublished.	
1950	"A Name for the City"	Harper's Magazine	—	Revised version used for Act I prologue of Requiem for a Nun	
1951	"Notes on a Horsethief"	Levee Press	—	Also published in Vogue in 1954 and incorporated into A Fable (1954)	
1954	"Mississippi"	Holiday	William Faulkner: Stories		
1954	"Sepulture South: Gaslight"	Harper's Bazaar	Uncollected Stories of William Faulkner		
1955	"Race at Morning"	The Saturday Evening Post	Big Woods; Uncollected Stories of William Faulkner	Revised for inclusion in Big Woods	
1955	"By the People"	Mademoiselle	—	Incorporated into chapter 13 of The Mansion	
1962	"Hell Creek Crossing"	The Saturday Evening Post	—	20 page excerpt from a draft of The Reivers	
1965	"Mr. Acarius"	The Saturday Evening Post	Uncollected Stories of William Faulkner		
1967	"The Wishing Tree"	Random House	—	Faulkner's only children's book, written in 1927	
1971	"Al Jackson"	William Faulkner und die humoristiche Tradition des amerikanischen Südens	Uncollected Stories of William Faulkner		
1973	"And Now What's To Do"	Mississippi Quarterly	—		
1976	"Music – Sweeter than the Angels Sing"	Southern Review	—		
1976	"The Priest"	Mississippi Quarterly	Uncollected Stories of William Faulkner		
1976	"Mayday"	University of Notre Dame Press	—		
1979	"Don Giovanni"	Mississippi Quarterly	Uncollected Stories of William Faulkner		
1979	"Peter"	—	Uncollected Stories of William Faulkner		
1979	"A Portrait of Elmer"	The Georgia Review	Uncollected Stories of William Faulkner		
1979	"Adolescence"	—	Uncollected Stories of William Faulkner		
1979	"Snow"	—	Uncollected Stories of William Faulkner		
1979	"Moonlight"	—	Uncollected Stories of William Faulkner		
1979	"With Caution and Dispatch"	Esquire	Uncollected Stories of William Faulkner		
1979	"Hog Pawn"	—	Uncollected Stories of William Faulkner	Revised and incorporated into the novel The Mansion as the fourteenth chapter	
1979	"A Dangerous Man"	—	Uncollected Stories of William Faulkner		
1979	"A Return"	—	Uncollected Stories of William Faulkner		
1979	"The Big Shot"	—	Uncollected Stories of William Faulkner	An alternate version without the Popeye plot (titled "Dull Tale") was not published.	
1979	"Once Aboard the Lugger (II)"	—	Uncollected Stories of William Faulkner		
1979	"Evangeline"	The Atlantic	Uncollected Stories of William Faulkner	Written around 1931	
1988	"Love"	The Missouri Review	—	Written around 1921	
1995	"Christmas Tree"	The Yale Review	—	Written around 1921 but rediscovered at the Rosenbach Museum and Library in 1970	
1995	"Rose of Lebanon"	The Oxford American	—	Written in 1930 but rejected by literary magazines, reworked into "A Return" in 1938	
1999	"Lucas Beauchamp"	Virginia Quarterly Review	—	1948 excerpt of Intruder in the Dust reworked into short story. The extent of Faulkner's involvement is unclear.	

== Theatre ==
Plays by William Faulkner
Year	Title	Notes	Ref.
1921	Marionettes	Unpublished one-act play, written at the University of Mississippi	

== Screenplays ==
=== Produced ===
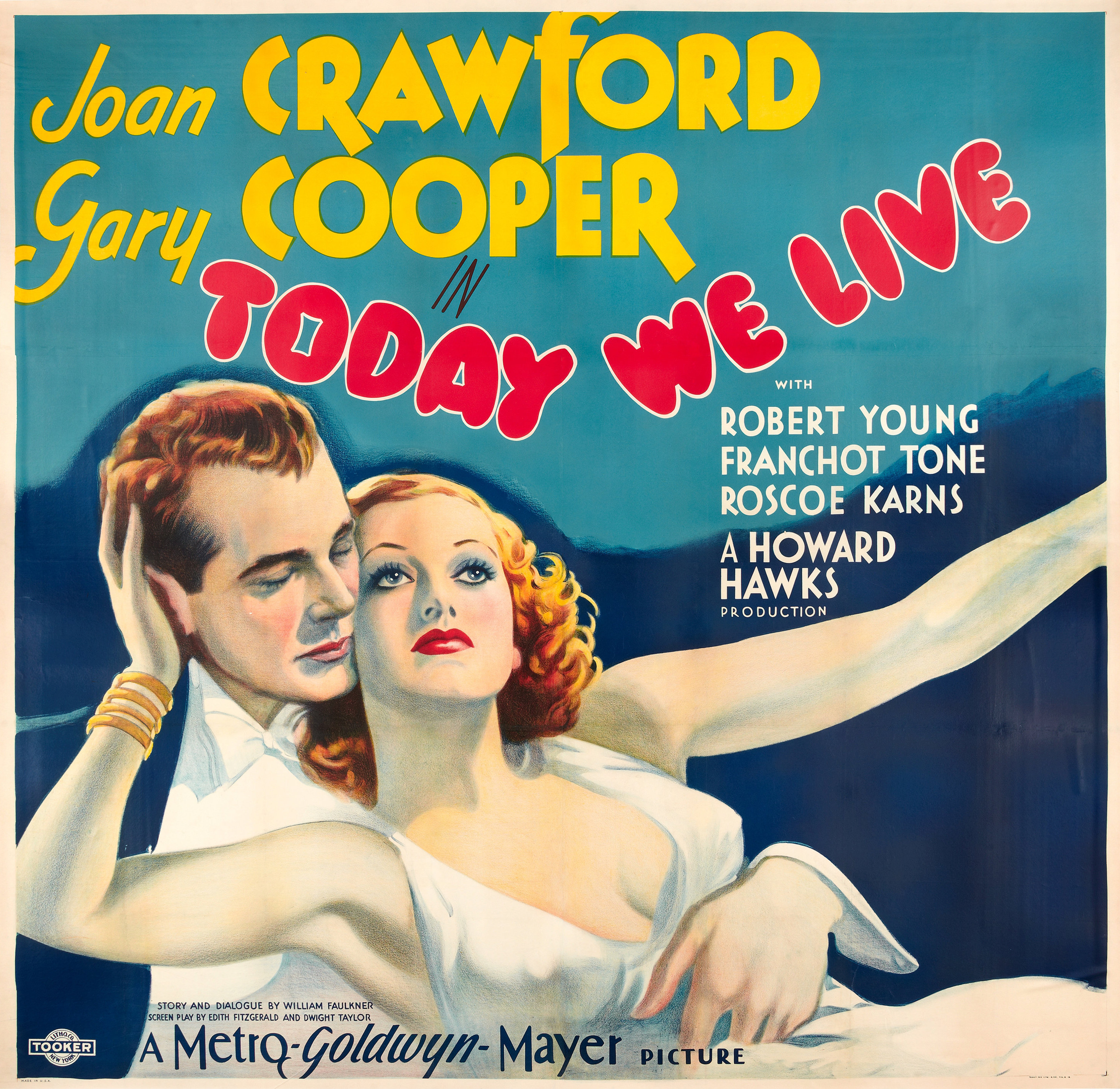
1933's Today We Live, directed by Howard Hawks and starring Gary Cooper and Joan Crawford, was the first film adapted from one of Faulkner's works.

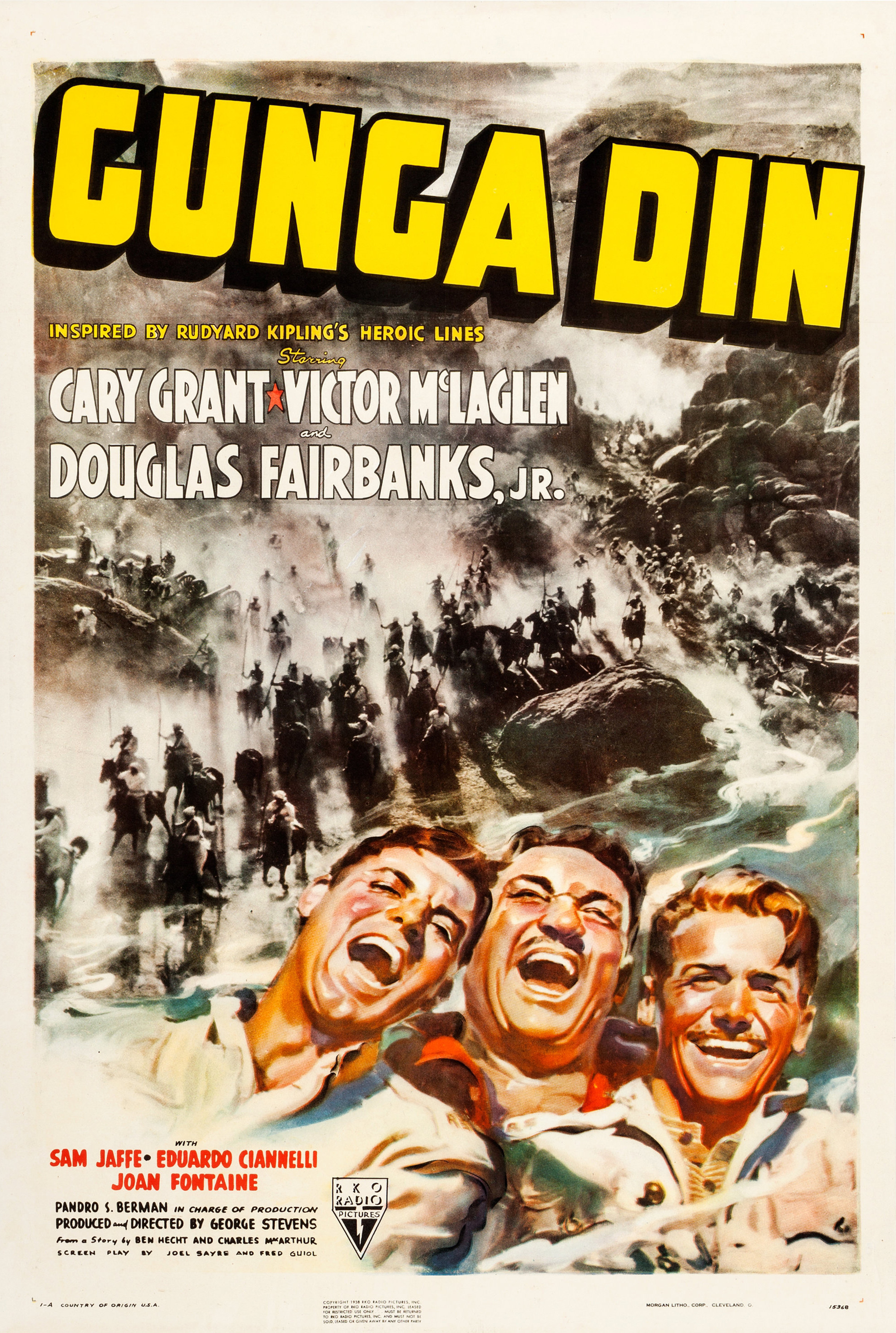
Faulkner was an uncredited screenplay writer for Gunga Din (1939).

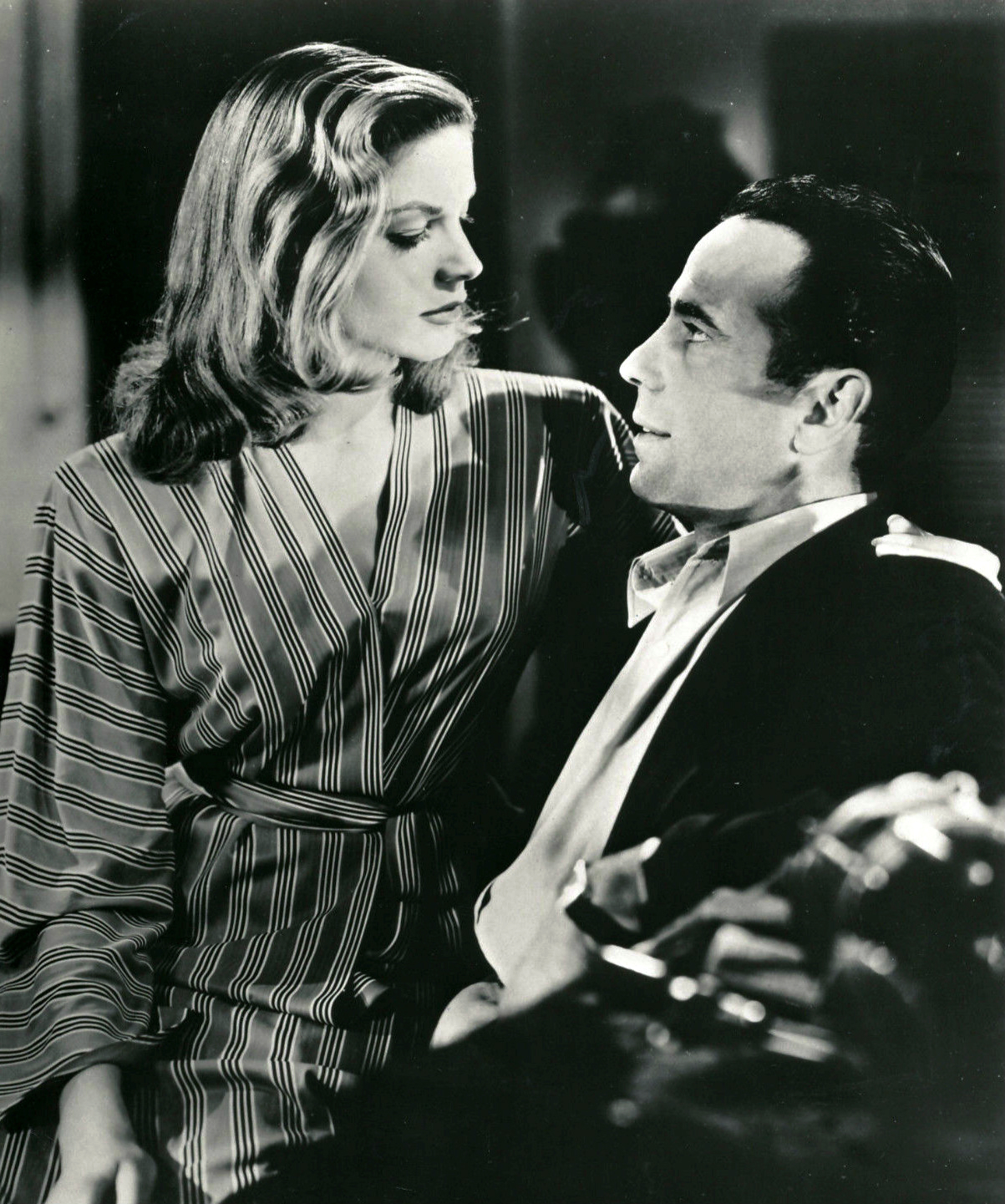
Faulkner co-wrote the 1946 adaptation (pictured) of Ernest Hemingway's novel To Have and Have Not. It remains the only film with contributions from two Nobel Prize Laureates.

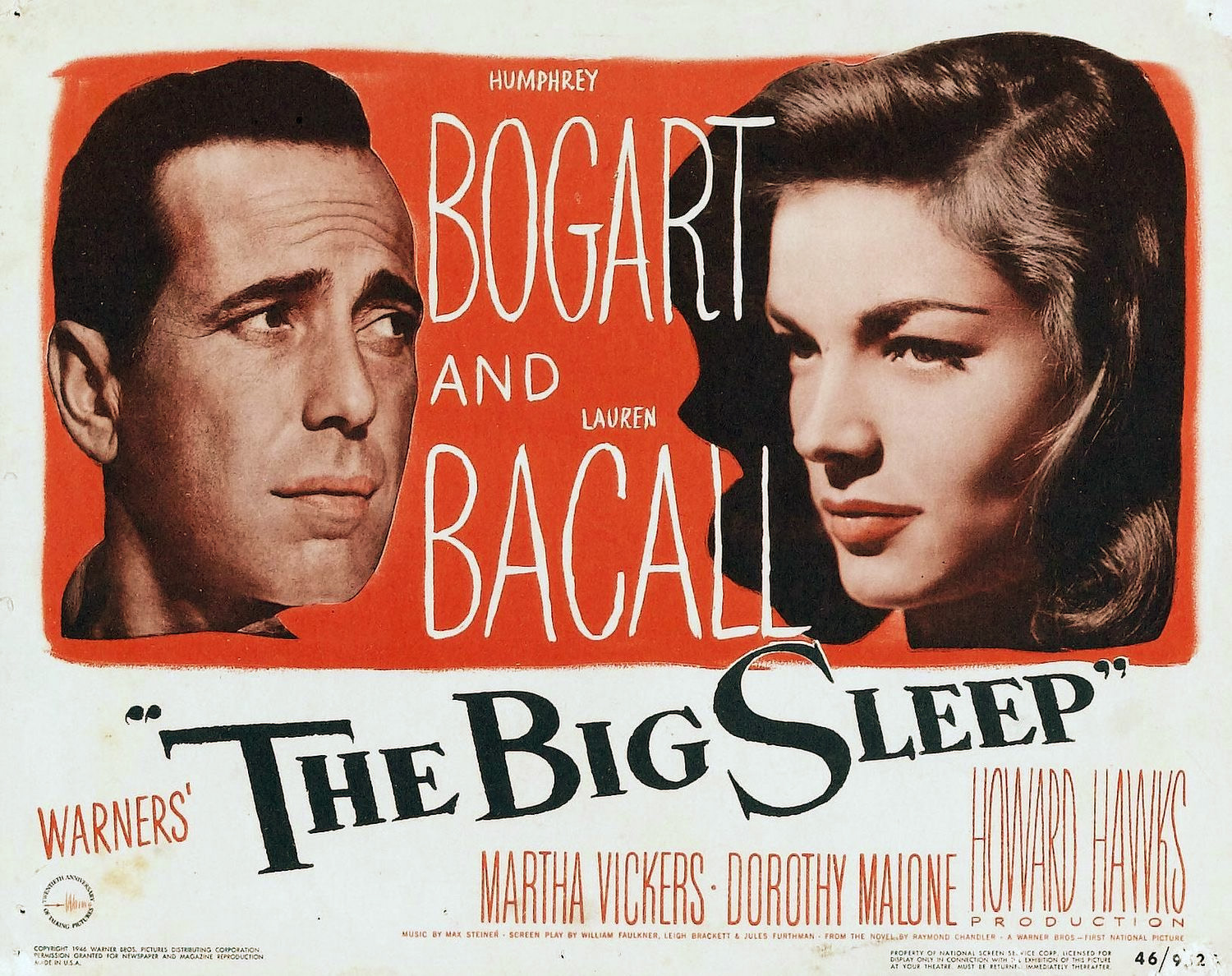
Faulkner co-wrote the Howard Hawks-directed The Big Sleep (1946).

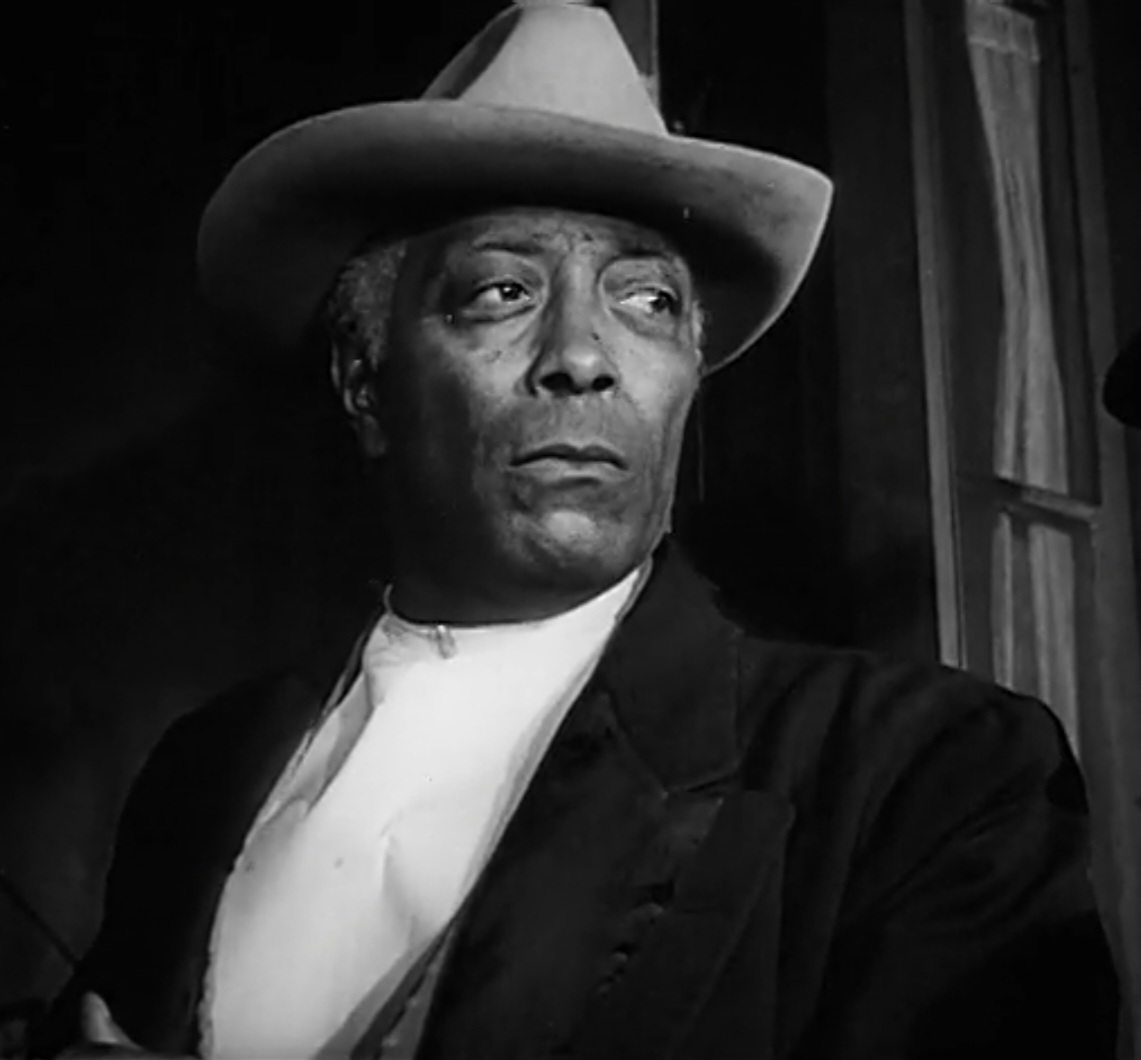
Lucas Beauchamp (portrayed by Juano Hernandez) in the 1949 Intruder in the Dust film adaptation

Produced screenplays by William Faulkner
Year	Film	Credit type	Based on	Ref.
1933	Today We Live	Dialogue and story	"Turn About" by William Faulkner	
1935	Banjo on My Knee	Uncredited	Banjo on my Knee by Harry Hamilton	
1936	The Road to Glory	Screenplay	—	
1936	The Petrified Forest	Uncredited, screenplay	The Petrified Forest by Robert E. Sherwood	
1937	Slave Ship	Story	The Last Slaver by George S. King	
1938	Submarine Patrol	Uncredited, screenplay	Ray Milholland's The Splinter Fleet of Otranto Barrage, 20th Century-Fox	
1939	Gunga Din	Uncredited, treatment and dialogue revision	"Gunga Din" by Rudyard Kipling	
1939	Drums Along the Mohawk	Uncredited contributor	Drums Along the Mohawk by Walter D. Edmonds	
1943	Northern Pursuit	Screenplay	—	
1944	To Have and Have Not	Screenplay	To Have and Have Not by Ernest Hemingway	
1945	The Southerner	Uncredited	Hold Autumn in Your Hand by George Sessions Perry	
1945	Mildred Pierce	Contract writer, uncredited	Mildred Pierce by James M. Cain	
1946	The Big Sleep	Screenplay	The Big Sleep by Raymond Chandler	
1947	Stallion Road	Uncredited, screenplay	Stephen Longstreet's eponymous novel, for Warner Bros.	
1949	Intruder in the Dust	Uncredited	Intruder in the Dust by Faulkner, suggestions and revisions may have been wholly rejected	
1953	Shall not Perish	Television screenplay	—	
1955	Land of the Pharaohs	Screenplay	—	
1955	The Left Hand of God	Uncredited, screenplay	The Left Hand of God by William Edmund Barrett	

=== Unproduced ===
Unproduced screenplays by William Faulkner
Year	Title	Type	Notes	Ref.
1932	Night Bird	Story outline for unwritten screenplay	Published in October 1982 by University of Tennessee Press.	
1932	Manservant	Treatment for unwritten screenplay	Based on Faulkner's short story "Love". Included in Faulkner's MGM Screenplays.	
1932	The College Widow	Treatment for unwritten screenplay	Included in Faulkner's MGM Screenplays.	
1932	Absolution	Treatment for unwritten screenplay	Based on Faulkner's "All the Dead Pilots". Included in Faulkner's MGM Screenplays.	
1932	Flying the Mail	Screenplay	Adapted from treatment by Ralph Graves and Bernard Fineman. Included in Faulkner's MGM Screenplays.	
1933	War Birds	Screenplay	For MGM, based on John McGavock Grider's War Birds as well as Faulkner's "All the Dead Pilots", "Ad Astra", and Sartoris. Included in Faulkner's MGM Screenplays.	
1933	"Mythical Latin-American Kingdom Story"	Screenplay	Included in Faulkner's MGM Screenplays.	
1933	Louisiana Lou	Screenplay	Used for the 1934 film Lazy River without Faulkner's involvement. Included in Faulkner's MGM Screenplays.	
1936	Wooden Crosses	Screenplay	For 20th Century-Fox	
1936	Zero Hour	Screenplay	For 20th Century-Fox	
c. 1940s	Dreadful Hollow	Screenplay	Written for Howard Hawks	
Early 1940s	Untitled	Screenplay	Involves a love triangle and murder at a carnival in Belgrade, Serbia, written with Dudley Murphy for Warner Bros., loose adaptation of Faulkner's "Wash" and Absalom! Absalom!	
1941	The Damned Don't Cry	Screenplay	Adaptation of Harry Hervey's 1939 novel of the same name	
1942	The De Gaulle Story	Screenplay		
1943	Country Lawyer	Story treatment	Adaptation of Bellamy Partridge's novel, albeit with the setting moved to Faulkner's Yoknapatawpha County, included in Country Lawyer and Other Stories for the Screen, published in June 1987 by University Press of Mississippi.	
1943	Battle Cry	Screenplay	Epic World War II film for which Warner Bros. denied director Howard Hawks funding, appears in Faulkner: A Comprehensive Guide to the Brodsky Collection, Volume IV: Battle Cry, published in December 1985 by University Press of Mississippi.	
1943	Revolt in the Earth	Screenplay	Written with Dudley Murphy for Warner Bros., loose adaptation of Faulkner's "Wash" and Absalom! Absalom!	
1943	The Life and Death of a Bomber	Screenplay	Patriotic film written to provide positive publicity for Consolidated Aircraft	
1946	One Way to Catch a Horse	Treatment		
1946	Continuous Performance	Treatment	Collaborated with unknown person	
c. 1948	Morningstar	Treatment	Concerns an interplanetary trip to Venus, discussed project with Howard Hawks	
1953	Old Man	Television screenplay	Adaptation of the "Old Man" chapter in Wild Palms	
1956	Untitled	Television screenplay	Concerns a conflicted man forced to testify before the House Un-American Activities Committee	
—	Untitled	Screenplay notes	Largely illegible, concerns a woman who buys a love potion	

== Poetry collections ==
Poetry collections by William Faulkner
Year	Title	Publisher	Notes	Ref.
1921	Vision in Spring	University of Mississippi	Published in the 1920–1921 Ole Miss yearbook	
1924	The Marble Faun	Four Seas	His first book published	
1933	A Green Bough	Harrison Smith and Robert Haas		
1962	Early Prose and Poetry	Little, Brown and Company	Compiled and edited by Carvel Collins, most had previously appeared in the Ole Miss student newspaper	
1981	Helen, a Courtship and Mississippi Poems	Tulane University Press & Yoknapatawpha Press	Joint publication	

== Essays ==
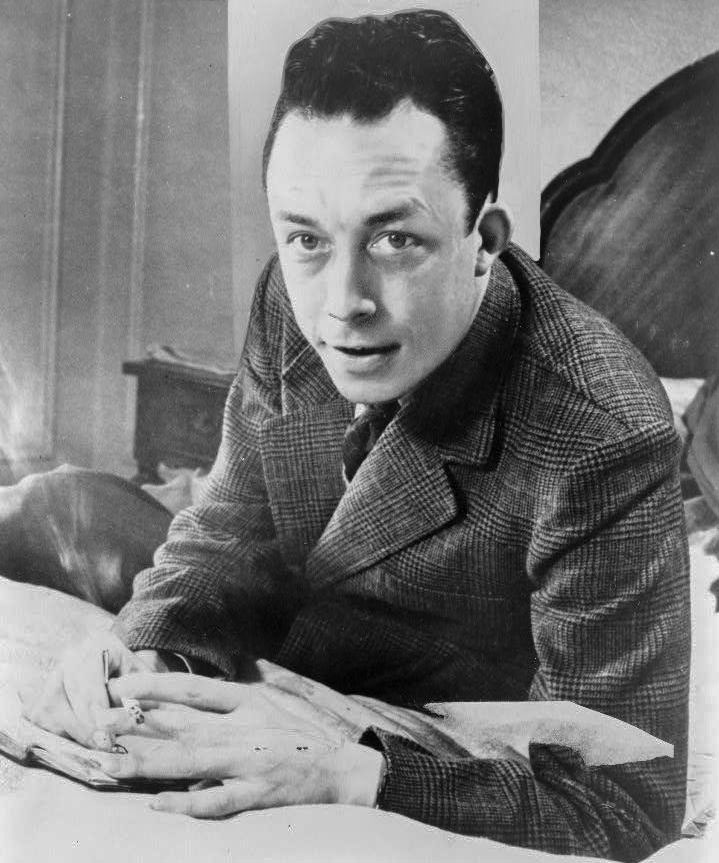
Faulkner's final essay was on Albert Camus, who adapted Faulkner's 1951 novel Requiem for a Nun for the stage.

Essays by William Faulkner
Year	Title	Notes	Ref.
1953	"A Note On Sherwood Anderson"		
1954	"Mississippi"		
1954	"A Guest's Impression of New England"		
1955	"An Innocent at Rinkside"		
1955	"Kentucky: May: Saturday"		
1955	"On Privacy"	With "On Fear", was part of larger unrealized essay collection "The American Dream"	
1955	"Impressions of Japan"		
1955	"To the Youth of Japan"		
1956	"Letter to a Northern Editor"		
1956	"On Fear: Deep South in Labor: Mississippi"	See "On Privacy"	
1956	"A Letter to the Leaders in the Negro Race"		
1961	"Albert Camus"		

== Book reviews ==
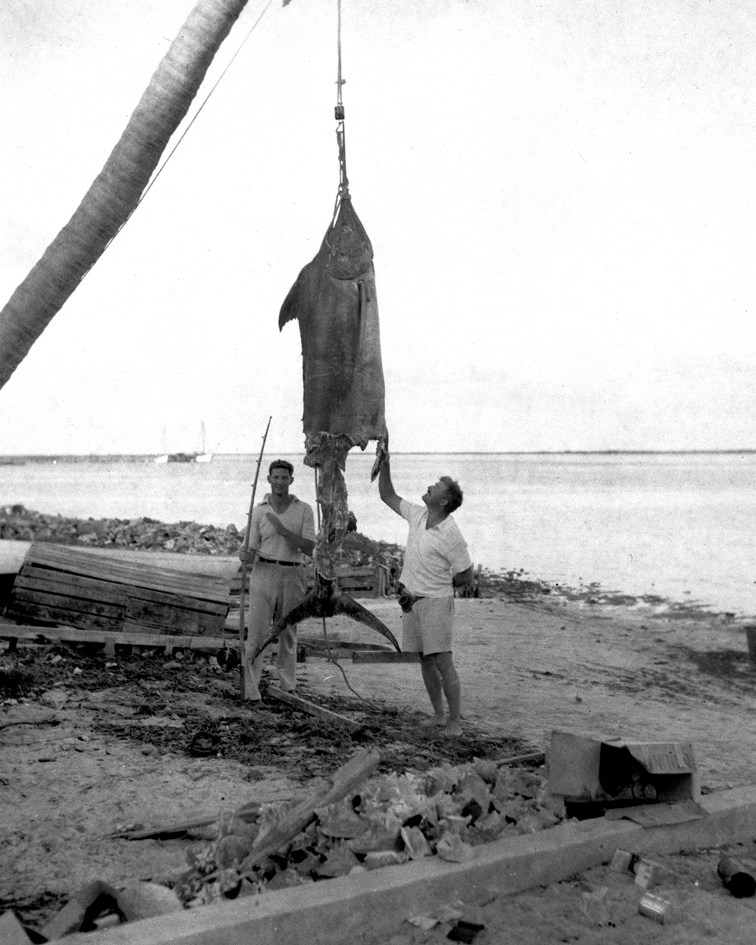
Faulkner wrote a review of Ernest Hemingway's (pictured right) The Old Man and the Sea (1952).

Book reviews by William Faulkner
Year	Book reviewed	Author	Published in	Ref.
1931	The Road Back	Erich Maria Remarque	The New Republic	
1935	Test Pilot	Jimmy Collins	American Mercury	
1952	The Old Man and the Sea	Ernest Hemingway	Shenandoah	

== Introductions ==
Introductions by William Faulkner
Year	Title	Ref.
1926	Foreword to Sherwood Anderson & Other Famous Creoles	
1932	Introduction to the Modern Library Edition of Sanctuary	
1954	Foreword to The Faulkner Reader	

== Public letters ==
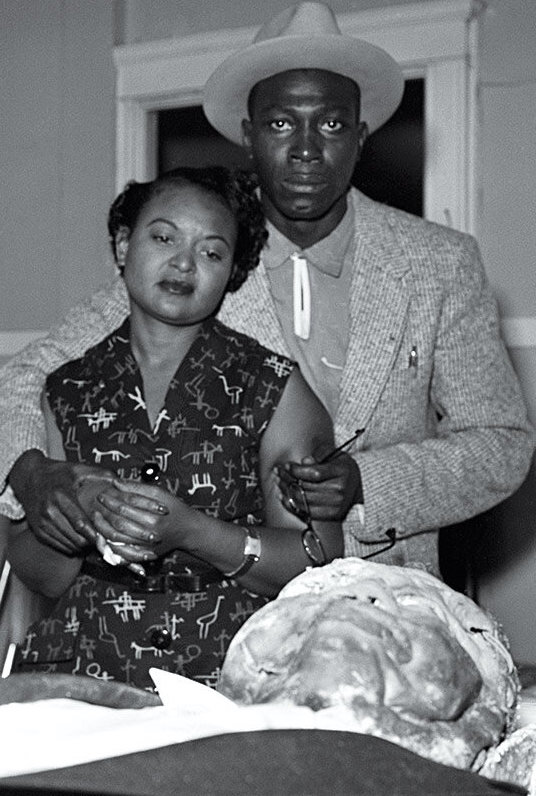
Faulkner wrote a public letter condemning the lynching of Emmett Till. Emmett's mother is pictured above his body.

Public letters by William Faulkner
Year	Title	Notes	Ref.
1927	To the Book Editor of the Chicago Tribune		
1938	To the President of the League of American Writers		
1941	To the Editor of the Memphis Commercial Appeal		
1946	"His Name Was Pete"	In the Oxford Eagle	
1947	To the Editor of the Oxford Eagle		
1950	To the Editor of the Memphis Commercial Appeal		
1950	To the Editor of the Memphis Commercial Appeal		
1950	To the Secretary of the American Academy of Arts and Letters		
1950	To the Voters of Oxford		
1950	To the Editor of the Oxford Eagle		
1950	To the Editor of the Time		
1951	Statement to the Press on the Willie McGee Case	Published in the Memphis Commercial Appeal	
1954	To the Editor of The New York Times		
1955	To the Editor of the Memphis Commercial Appeal		
1955	To the Editor of the Memphis Commercial Appeal		
1955	To the Editor of The New York Times		
1955	To the Editor of the Memphis Commercial Appeal		
1955	To the Editor of the Memphis Commercial Appeal		
1955	To the Editor of the Memphis Commercial Appeal		
1955	Press Dispatch on the Emmet Till Case	Provided to United Press International	
1956	To the Editor of Life		
1956	To the Editor of the Reporter		
1956	To the Editor of Time		
1956	To the Editor of Time		
1956	To the Editor of The New York Times		
1957	To the Editor of Time		
1957	To the Editor of the Memphis Commercial Appeal		
1957	Notice	September 24, published in the Oxford Eagle	
1957	Notice	Published in the Oxford Eagle	
1960	To the Editor of The New York Times		

== Speeches ==
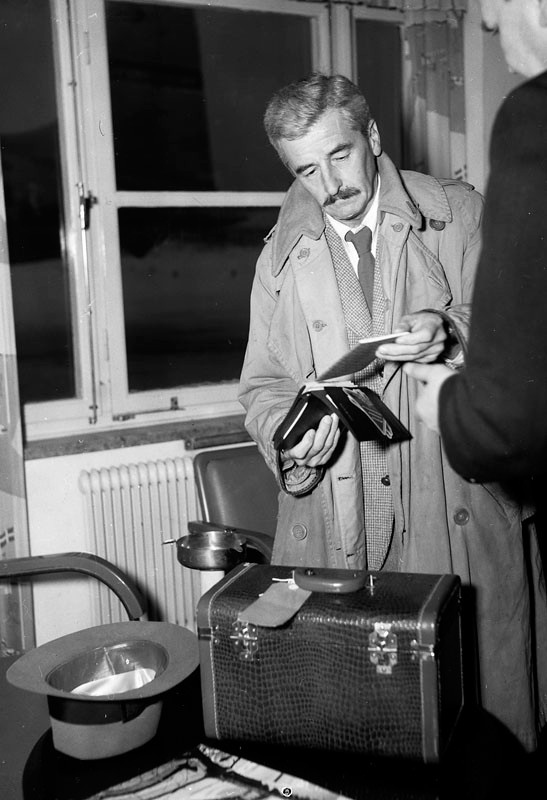
Faulkner arrives in Sweden in 1950 to receive the 1949 Nobel Prize in Literature.

"I decline to accept the end of man... I believe that man will not merely endure: he will prevail. He is immortal, not because he alone among creatures has an inexhaustible voice, but because he has a soul, a spirit capable of compassion and sacrifice and endurance."

— Faulkner in his 1950 Nobel Prize acceptance speech

Speeches by William Faulkner
Year	Title	Notes	Ref.
1940	Funeral Sermon for Mammy Caroline Barr	Barr was a former slave and the "mammy" who had helped raise Faulkner.	
1950	Upon Receiving the Nobel Prize for Literature	Although he won the Nobel Prize in 1949, Faulkner accepted the award alongside 1950 Laureate Bertrand Russell in a combined ceremony.	
1951	To the Graduating Class, University High School		
1951	Upon Being Made an Officer of the Legion of Honor		
1952	To the Delta Council		
1953	To the Graduating Class, Pine Manor Junior College		
1955	Upon Receiving the National Book Award for Fiction		
1955	To the Southern Historical Association		
1957	Upon Receiving the Silver Medal of the Athens Academy		
1957	To the American Academy of Arts and Letters in Presenting the Gold Medal for Fiction to John Dos Passos		
1958	To the Raven, Jefferson, and ODK Societies of the University of Virginia		
1958	To the English Club of the University of Virginia		
1959	To the U.S. National Commission for UNESCO		
1962	To the American Academy of Arts and Letters upon Receiving the Gold Medal for Fiction		
