= The Reivers =

1962 novel by William Faulkner

- First edition
- Author: William Faulkner
- Language: English
- Publisher: Random House
- Publication date: June 4, 1962
- Publication place: United States
- Media type: Print (hardback & paperback)
- Pages: 305
- Preceded by: The Mansion (1959)

The Reivers: A Reminiscence, published in 1962, is the last novel by the American author William Faulkner. It was published a month before his death. The bestselling novel was awarded the Pulitzer Prize for Fiction in 1963. Faulkner previously won this award for his book A Fable, making him one of only four authors to be awarded it more than once. Unlike many of his earlier works, it is a straightforward narration and eschews the complicated literary techniques of his more well-known works. It is a picaresque novel, and as such may seem uncharacteristically lighthearted given its subject matter. For these reasons, The Reivers is often ignored by Faulkner scholars or dismissed as a lesser work. He previously had referred to writing a "Golden Book of Yoknapatawpha County" with which he would finish his literary career. It is likely that The Reivers was meant to be this "Golden Book". The Reivers was adapted into a film of the same name directed by Mark Rydell and starring Steve McQueen as Boon Hogganbeck.

== Plot ==
In the early 20th century, an 11-year-old boy named Lucius Priest (a distant cousin of the McCaslin/Edmonds family Faulkner wrote about in Go Down, Moses) somewhat unwittingly gets embroiled in a plot to go to Memphis with dimwitted family friend and manservant Boon Hogganbeck. Boon steals (reives, thereby becoming a reiver) Lucius' grandfather's car, one of the first cars in Yoknapatawpha County. They discover that Ned McCaslin, a black man who works with Boon at Lucius' grandfather's stables, has stowed away with them (Ned is also a blood cousin of the Priests).

When they reach Memphis, Boon and Lucius stay in a boarding-house (brothel). Miss Reba, the madam, and Miss Corrie, Boon's favorite girl, are appalled to see that Boon has brought a child. In fact, Corrie's nephew Otis, an ill-mannered and off-putting boy about Lucius' age, is already staying there. In the evening, Otis reveals that Corrie (whose real name is Everbe Corinthia) used to prostitute herself in their old town, and he would charge men to watch her through a peephole. Outraged at his conduct, Lucius fights Otis, who cuts his hand with a pocketknife. Boon breaks up the fight but Corrie is so moved by Lucius' chivalry that she decides to stop whoring. Later, Ned returns to the boarding-house and reveals he traded the car for a supposedly lame racehorse.

Corrie, Reba, Ned, Boon and Lucius hatch a scheme to smuggle the horse by rail to a nearby town, Parsham, to race a horse it has lost to twice already. Ned figures that everyone in town will bet against the horse and he can win enough money to buy back the car; he claims to have a secret ability to make the horse run. Corrie uses another client who works for the railroad, Sam, to get them and the horse on a night train. In town, Ned takes Lucius to stay with a black family while they practice for the horse race. Unfortunately, the local lawman named Butch finds them out and attempts to extort sexual favors from Corrie to look the other way. Reba is able to send him away by claiming she will reveal to the town that he intentionally ordered two prostitutes, angering his constituency.

On the day of the race, Lucius rides the horse (named Coppermine but called Lightning by Ned) and loses the first of three heats as planned. Just as the second heat begins, Butch returns to break up the horserace and arrest Boon for stealing the horse. Lucius and one of Ned's kinsman are able to get the horse to safety; Corrie is supposedly able to clear the whole ordeal up by having sex with Butch and the race takes place as scheduled the next day. Lucius and Lightning win much to everyone's surprise, but are greeted at the track by Boss Priest, Lucius' grandfather.

That night, Ned reveals his scheme: his cousin Bobo accrued a huge gambling debt to a white man and agreed to steal a horse to make up for it. Ned recognizes some kind of spirit in the horse that he once saw before in a lame mule he was able to make race. Ned decides to try to bet the horse against the car, but Boss Priest's arrival ruins his scheme. Now himself embroiled in the horse theft and confusion, Boss Priest is forced to enter another race: if they win, he pays $500 to legally take the horse but reveal Ned's secret (he enticed the horse with sardines); if they lose he pays $500 but does not have to take the horse. Ned intentionally throws the race, knowing the horse is worthless. Boss pays the penalty and they get the car back.

Back home, Boss Priest saves Lucius from receiving a beating from his father, knowing that the ordeal he went through at his age was punishment enough. Boon and Corrie eventually marry and name their son Lucius Priest Hogganbeck.

== Characters ==
=== Boon Hogganbeck ===
Boon is also a major character in Go Down, Moses, where he appears as a McCaslin/Priest family retainer of limited education and interests. In The Reivers he shows the unexpected qualities of a car lover and a romantic hero; his marriage ties up a major "loose end" in the Faulkner canon.

=== Ned McCaslin ===
Ned's character resembles that of his distant relative Lucas Beauchamp in many ways. Like Lucas, he at least pretends to work for his white cousins while constantly outwitting them in various ways. The Priests invariably find it in their hearts to forgive him.

| Preceded by The Mansion | Novels set in Yoknapatawpha County | Succeeded by none |
