= If I Forget Thee, Jerusalem =

1939 novel by William Faulkner

First edition cover

If I Forget Thee, Jerusalem is a novel by the American author William Faulkner published in 1939. The novel was originally published under the title The Wild Palms, which is the title of one of the two interwoven stories. This title was chosen by the publishers, Random House, over the objections of Faulkner's choice of a title. Subsequent editions have since been printed under the title If I Forget Thee Jerusalem (1990, following the "corrected text" and format of Noel Polk), and since 2003 it is now usually referred to by both names, with the newer title following the historically first published title and in brackets, to avoid confusion: The Wild Palms [If I Forget Thee, Jerusalem].

Like four other Faulkner novels (Soldiers' Pay, Mosquitoes, Pylon and A Fable), the novel is not set in his fictional Yoknapatawpha County.

== Synopsis ==
The book consists of two different stories, told in non-linear fashion in alternating chapters, which contain both parallels and contrasts.

Wild Palms starts in New Orleans in 1937 with Harry, an impoverished and virginal intern finishing his training in a hospital. At a party he meets Charlotte, who abandons her husband and two children to run away with him.

With little money and few employment prospects, they drift through Chicago to a cabin in Wisconsin and then a mine in Utah. There Charlotte falls pregnant and they decide to go to the Mississippi coast. When she dies after he tries an abortion, he is sentenced to 50 years' hard labor. Charlotte's husband visits and slips him a cyanide pill. Harry ultimately refuses to take it. He tells himself, “Between grief and nothing I will take grief.”

Old Man starts on a prison farm in Mississippi in 1927, where a convict has served time since his early teens. When the river overflows its levees, he is ordered to take a skiff and rescue people from rooftops. He saves a woman in advanced pregnancy. The force of the current drives them downstream. He manages to land on a hillock, where the woman gives birth to her child. Later, an official motor boat appears, taking the skiff, convict, woman and baby to New Orleans. They sneak away, and the convict paddles the skiff against the current until he is able to leave the woman and baby near a place she knows. He carries on up to the prison, where 10 years are added to his sentence for escaping.

== Cultural allusions ==
Argentine writer Jorge Luis Borges translated the complete novel into Spanish as Las palmeras salvajes (1940). The Wild Palms is quoted in Jean-Luc Godard's 1960 film, Breathless ("À bout de souffle"), when Patricia claims to prefer to take "grief rather than nothing". It also appears in the movie Im Lauf der Zeit, 1976, by Wim Wenders, in which one of the protagonists, a truckdriver, is reading his paperback copy of the book every now and then, and in the movie Perfect Days, 2023, also by Wim Wenders. Agnès Varda claimed in her film The Beaches of Agnès that the structure of Faulkner's novel directly inspired her first feature, La Pointe Courte.
