= Collected Stories of William Faulkner =

1950 short story collection by William Faulkner

First edition

Collected Stories of William Faulkner is a short story collection by William Faulkner published by Random House in 1950. It won the National Book Award for Fiction in 1951. The publication of this collection of 42 stories was authorized and supervised by Faulkner himself, who came up with the themed section headings.

== Contents ==
I. THE COUNTRY

- "Barn Burning"
- "Shingles for the Lord"
- "The Tall Men"
- "A Bear Hunt"
- "Two Soldiers"
- "Shall Not Perish"

II. THE VILLAGE

- "A Rose for Emily"
- "Hair"
- "Centaur in Brass"
- "Dry September"
- "Death Drag"
- "Elly"
- "Uncle Willy"
- "Mule in the Yard"
- "That Will Be Fine"
- "That Evening Sun"

III. THE WILDERNESS

- "Red Leaves"
- "A Justice"
- "A Courtship"
- "Lo!"

IV. THE WASTELAND

- "Ad Astra"
- "Victory"
- "Crevasse"
- "Turnabout"
- "All the Dead Pilots"

V. THE MIDDLE GROUND

- "Wash"
- "Honor"
- "Dr. Martin"
- "Fox Hunt"
- "Pennsylvania Station"
- "Artist at Home"
- "The Brooch"
- "Grandmother Millard"
- "Golden Land"
- "There Was a Queen"
- "Mountain Victory"

VI. BEYOND

- "Beyond"
- "Black Music"
- "The Leg"
- "Mistral"
- "Divorce in Naples"
- "Carcassonne"
