= Two Soldiers =

Two Soldiers may refer to:

- Two Soldiers (1943 film) (Два бойца), a Russian WWII film
- Two Soldiers (두병사), a 1995 North Korean film
- Two Soldiers (2003 film), an American short film based on a Willam Faulkner story
- "Two Soldiers", a 1942 short story by William Faulkner
