= Soldiers' Pay =

1926 novel by William Faulkner

Soldiers’ Pay
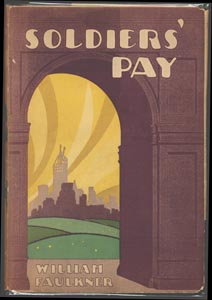
- Author: William Faulkner
- Publisher: Boni & Liveright
- Publication date: February 25, 1926
- Pages: 319

Soldiers' Pay is the first novel published by the American author William Faulkner. It was originally published by Boni & Liveright on February 25, 1926. It is unclear if Soldiers' Pay is the first novel written by Faulkner. It is however the first novel published by the author. Faulkner was working on two manuscripts while finishing Soldiers' Pay.

== Plot overview ==
The plot of Soldiers' Pay revolves around the return of a wounded aviator home to a small town in Georgia following the conclusion of the First World War. He is escorted by a veteran of the war, and a widow. The aviator himself suffered a traumatic brain injury, and is in a state of perpetual silence, and blindness. Several conflicts revolve around the aviator's return including the state of his engagement to his fiancée, the widow's desire to marry the dying aviator herself, and the intrigue surrounding the fiancée who had been unfaithful to the aviator during his absence.

Soldier's Pay is one of only a few of the author's novels not set in his fictional Yoknapatawpha County, Mississippi.

== Publication history ==
William Faulkner was a friend of American writer Sherwood Anderson and a member of his literary circle in 1920s New Orleans. As the story goes, it was Anderson who agreed to send the Soldiers' Pay manuscript to his publisher as long as Anderson himself did not have to read it.

In a 1950 letter from Faulkner's lifelong friend Phil Stone to Glenn O Carey, Stone acknowledges that it was Anderson who was instrumental in getting Soldiers' Pay published. "With all the efforts we made, I was not able to get Faulkner published and Sherwood Anderson was the one who got him started as far as publication goes."

Horace Liveright agreed to pay Faulkner $200.00 for the manuscript, which was originally titled Mayday. Editor and chief at Boni & Liveright T.R. Smith is likely the source of the title change. The first print run of Soldiers' Pay was 2,500 copies.

The New York Times reviewer described the novel as "poignant with beauty as well as a penetrating irony," and judged that "it belongs among such excellent conceptions of war and man as are to be found in "What Price Glory" and C. E. Montague's Disenchantment."

By the standards of the day, Soldiers' Pay and Faulkner's second novel Mosquitoes were commercial failures. Neither novel sold more than 1,200 copies after its initial release. Since Faulkner was awarded the 1949 Nobel Prize for Literature, Soldiers' Pay has remained in print. First edition copies are valuable among collectors, often selling for upwards of $35,000.

The original manuscript of Mayday from which Soldiers' Pay was edited was dedicated in Faulkner's manuscript to a love interest named Helen Baird.

Hollywood producer Jerry Wald once considered making Soldiers' Pay into a movie.
