= Go Down, Moses (book) =

1942 collection of short fiction by William Faulkner

- First edition
- Author: William Faulkner
- Language: English
- Publisher: Random House (US)
- Publication date: 1942
- Publication place: United States
- Media type: Print (hardback)
- Pages: 383
- OCLC: 21562002
- Dewey Decimal: 813/.54 20
- LC Class: PS3511.A86 G58 1990
- Preceded by: The Hamlet
- Followed by: Intruder in the Dust

Go Down, Moses is a 1942 collection of seven related pieces of short fiction by American author William Faulkner, sometimes considered a novel. The most prominent character and unifying voice is that of Isaac McCaslin, "Uncle Ike", who will live to be an old man; "uncle to half a county and father to no one". Though originally published as a short story collection, Faulkner considered the book to be a novel in the same way The Unvanquished is considered a novel. Because of this, most editions no longer print "and other stories" in the title.

The year is about 1859. "Cass" lives with his great-uncles Theophilus and Amodeus McCaslin, called "Uncle Buck" and "Uncle Buddy" respectively by most of the characters in the book. The story opens with the news that Tomey's Turl, a slave on the McCaslin plantation, has run away. But this is not the first time this has happened and Uncle Buck and Buddy know where he always goes, to Hubert Beauchamp's neighboring plantation to see his love, a slave girl named Tennie. Beauchamp himself has an unmarried sister, Sophonsiba, nicknamed "Sibbey", who seems romantically interested in Buck. Forced to stay the night to look for Tomey's Turl, Buck and Cass accidentally enter Sophonsiba's room, thinking it to be their room. This situation is exploited by Hubert who tries to press Buck into marrying Sophonsiba. Buck does not agree to Hubert's exploitative interpretation of events. Buck, Buddy and Hubert settle both their situation and that of Tomey's Turl by tying them to the outcome of a poker match. If Buck loses, he is to marry Sophonsiba and must agree to buy the slave girl Tennie so Turl will stop running away to see her. Buck loses, but coaxes Hubert into allowing another game, Hubert against Buddy, to determine the marriage and property issues. The stakes are changed many times, but in the end Buddy wins and the McCaslins take Tennie for free.

Uncle Buck and Sophonsiba Beauchamp eventually marry and become the parents of Isaac McCaslin, the central character who serves to unify most of the stories in the novel.

"Was" serves to introduce the reader into the practices and mentality of the antebellum South. Where Tomey's Turl is first introduced, he seems to be referred to more as an animal, such as a horse, than a person. When Hubert and Buck are taking bets on where Tomey's Turl will show up, the reader further sees how far removed from human the slaves are in the eyes of the owners. (Faulkner later reveals that Tomey's Turl is Buck and Buddy's half-brother, the son of their father, Lucius Quintus Carothers McCaslin, and his slave Tomey.) Additionally, it is possible Faulkner intends for the entrapment of Buck into marriage with Sophonsiba to be analogous to slavery, although Buck seems to accept it silently.

== "Was" ==
=== Summary ===
Old Isaac McCaslin heard this story, relating events that took place before he was born, from his older cousin, McCaslin Edmonds, who was 16 years his senior and like a father to him. A young child, McCaslin Edmonds, rides with his Uncle Buck to the neighboring plantation of Hubert Beauchamp, in pursuit of an escaped slave. The slave, Tomey's Turl, runs away frequently to visit Tennie, a slave of the Beauchamps with whom he is in love. Tomey's Turl eludes McCaslin and Uncle Buck, who are forced to rely on the leisurely Hubert Beauchamp for help. They are forced to eat dinner with Beauchamp and his sister Sophonsiba, "Sibbey", who is looking for a husband and has Uncle Buck in mind. Hubert and Buck search through the woods for Turl and make a 500-dollar bet over whether he will be caught outside Tennie's cabin that night. That night he is indeed at the cabin, but he runs past them and eludes capture. Buck and young McCaslin are forced to spend the night at the plantation house.

Buck and the boy accidentally go into the wrong bedroom and discover Sophonsiba lying in the bed. She wakes up and screams, and Beauchamp takes advantage of the situation to try to press Buck to marry Sophonsiba. Buck rejects the idea angrily, and the two men play cards to settle things: a single hand of poker will decide whether Buck will have to marry Sophonsiba and also who has to buy the other's slave, since the situation with Tennie and Tomey's Turl is clearly unmanageable as it is. Buck loses the hand and sends McCaslin home to fetch Buck's twin brother, Buddy, a legendary poker player. Buddy arrives and coaxes Beauchamp into another poker game. They spend a great deal of time hammering out the stakes, but in the end, Beauchamp folds, and Buddy wins the game. Uncle Buck, Uncle Buddy, McCaslin, Tennie, and Tomey's Turl return to the McCaslin plantation—Tennie and Tomey's Turl will be married.

=== Themes ===
Faulkner's technique in Go Down, Moses is to present stories whose full significance in the overall history of his characters is not apparent until later in the book. The book explores the history and development of the McCaslin family, descended from Lucius Quintus Carothers McCaslin ("Carothers McCaslin") and occupies the plantation he founded. Faulkner incorporates into the McCaslin family many of the characteristics he viewed as essential to an understanding of the South as a whole, including the painful racial divide between whites and blacks that defined Southern history in the decades before and after the Civil War. He does this by splitting the McCaslin family tree into two branches, one white and the other black. The white branch, obviously, descends from Carothers McCaslin and his wife; the black branch descends from Carothers McCaslin and the slave-girl Tomey, with whom McCaslin had a sexual relationship.

"Was", which appears at first to be simply an innocuous and amusing story (if one historically appalling in its treatment of blacks and women as things to be gambled over) about the marital maneuverings between a spinster and an affirmed bachelor, is actually the story of the origin of the black branch of the McCaslin family tree. Tomey's Turl is Carothers McCaslin's son, Buck and Buddy's half-brother, by the slave girl Tomey. Turl and his own wife, Tennie, will continue the black McCaslin branch into the future.

== "The Fire and the Hearth" ==
=== Summary ===
Many years later (around 1941) Lucas Beauchamp, the son of Tomey's Turl and Tennie, lives and works on the McCaslin plantation, now owned by Carothers "Roth" Edmonds, the grandson of Carothers McCaslin "Cass" Edmonds (Isaac and Lucas' elder cousin). Lucas discovers a gold coin on the land and becomes convinced of a large hidden treasure. Also, Lucas' daughter is being pursued for marriage, despite her father's wishes, by a poor black man, George Wilkins.

Lucas and George both distill liquor illegally, and Lucas decides to prevent Wilkins' marriage to his daughter by informing Roth, since the liquor is being made on Roth's land. Roth calls the authorities, but they arrive just as Wilkins has put large jugs of whiskey on Lucas' porch and as his daughter hides the still in his own backyard. While Lucas' daughter cannot testify against Lucas due to kinship, George Wilkins can. Consequently, Lucas is forced into allowing the marriage between Wilkins and his daughter to prevent Wilkins from having to testify against him. Lucas returns to the plantation and cons a salesman out of a metal detector to search for the treasure he adamantly believes exists. The search becomes an obsession, and Lucas' wife asks Roth for a divorce. Lucas initially agrees to the divorce but recants at the last moment, deciding he's too old. The treasure isn't meant for him to find.

=== Themes ===
Touched upon is the impotence of the black man's actions. Lucas must persuade Roth, a man a generation younger than Lucas and seemingly less deserving of the Carothers plantation than Lucas is, to report George Wilkins in order for the tip off to be taken seriously by authorities.

== "Pantaloon in Black" ==
=== Summary ===
Rider, an extremely strong and large black man who lives on Carothers "Roth" Edmonds' plantation, is bereaved by the death of his wife. He digs his wife's grave at great speed, and the visitors at the funeral wonder why he is digging his wife into the ground so quickly.

That night, Rider believes he sees his wife's ghost. He returns to work at a sawmill the next day, but after chucking an exceptionally large log down a hill, walks off the job and buys a jug of whiskey, drinking copiously. Rider goes to the tool room at the mill and confronts a man named Birdsong, who has been cheating black men at dice for many years. Rider cuts Birdsong's throat. The narrative shifts, and the story is now in the home of the local sheriff's deputy.

Rider is quickly tried and taken to the sheriff's cell. He breaks the cell up a good deal. A party of white men arrive, seize Rider, and lynch him.

== "The Old People" ==
=== Summary ===
In the forest, Sam Fathers, the son of a Chickasaw chief and a black slave-girl, teaches Isaac McCaslin how to hunt. When Isaac is deemed old enough to go on the yearly hunting expeditions with Major de Spain, General Compson, and Isaac's older cousin McCaslin Edmonds, he kills his first buck, and Sam Fathers ritualistically anoints him with its blood. Isaac remembers Sam Fathers’ history; the son of Ikkemotubbe, the chief who sold the land to the white people and also sold his son and wife into slavery, Sam left the Jefferson area for the big forest after the death of Jobaker, his Choctaw friend. Sam now tends the hunting camp of Major de Spain and McCaslin Edmonds.

After Isaac kills his buck, the group is making ready to leave, when Boon Hogganbeck rides in on a mule declaring that he has just seen a massive buck. The group disperses to try to hunt the big deer before they leave. Sam leads Isaac to a clearing; they hear Walter Ewell's horn, and Isaac assumes the buck has been killed. But then a giant buck comes down the slope towards them and looks at them with gravity and dignity. Sam calls it "grandfather." They refrain from shooting it.

That night, McCaslin and Isaac stay at Major de Spain's house near Jefferson, 17 miles away from the McCaslin plantation. In bed, Isaac tells McCaslin about the buck, and McCaslin speculates that it represented some form of indomitable, primal energy that grows up out of the earth from all the blood that seeps into it and all the lives it absorbs. Isaac thinks that McCaslin does not believe him, that he is accusing him of claiming to have seen a ghost; but McCaslin tells him solemnly that he, too, has seen the buck: Sam took him into that same clearing the day he killed his first deer.

== "The Bear" ==
=== Summary ===
As Isaac grows older, he becomes an expert hunter and woodsman, and continues going with the hunting parties every year. The group becomes increasingly preoccupied with hunting down Old Ben, a monstrous, almost immortal bear that wreaks havoc throughout the forest. Old Ben's foot was maimed in a trap, and he seems impervious to bullets.

Isaac learns to track Old Ben, but hunting him is futile, because all the hounds fear him. Sam Fathers, who teaches Isaac Old Ben's ways, says that it will take an extraordinary dog to bring Old Ben down.

Isaac sees Old Ben several times. Once, they send a tiny fyce-dog with no sense of danger after him, and Isaac has a shot at the huge bear. But instead of taking the shot, Isaac runs after the fyce and dives to save him from the bear. Isaac looks up at Old Ben looming over him and remembers the image from his dreams about the bear.

At last they find a dog capable of bringing Old Ben to bay: Lion, a huge, wild Airedale Terrier cross with extraordinary courage and savagery. Sam makes Lion semi-tame by starving him until he will allow himself to be touched; soon, Boon Hogganbeck has devoted himself to Lion and even shares a bed with him. Using Lion, they nearly catch Old Ben, but Boon misses five point-blank shots. General Compson hits the bear and draws blood, but Old Ben escapes into the forest.

Isaac and Boon go into Memphis to buy whisky for the men, and the next day, they go after the bear again. General Compson declares that he wants Isaac to ride Kate, the only mule who is not afraid of wild animals and, therefore, the best chance any of the men have to get close enough to the bear to kill him.

In the deep woods, near the river, Lion leaps at Old Ben and takes hold of his throat. Old Ben seizes Lion and begins shredding his stomach with its claws. Boon draws his knife and throws himself on top of the bear, stabbing it in its back. Old Ben dies, and a few days later, Lion dies. Sam Fathers collapses after the fight and dies not long after Lion. Lion and Sam are buried in the same clearing.

Isaac returns to the farm near Jefferson, to the old McCaslin plantation. Time passes; eventually he is 21, time for him to assume control of the plantation, which is his by inheritance. But he renounces it in favor of his older cousin (once-removed), McCaslin Edmonds. Isaac has a long argument with McCaslin in which Isaac declares his belief that the land cannot be owned, that the curse of God's Earth is man's attempt to own the land, and that curse has led to slavery and the destruction of the South. McCaslin tries to convince him to accept the land, with a convoluted metaphysical argument about the fated responsibilities the white race has taken on. But Isaac remembers reading the old ledger books of Uncle Buck and Uncle Buddy, piecing together the sordid story of the plantation's slaves, and he refuses the inheritance. (One of Isaac's inferences is particularly appalling: Tomey, the slave whom Carothers McCaslin took as a lover and begat Turl, might also have been Carothers McCaslin's daughter by another slave, Eunice, who committed suicide shortly before Turl's birth. From this and other factors, Isaac deduces that she must also have been Carothers McCaslin's lover.)

After refusing the inheritance, Isaac moves into town and becomes a carpenter, eschewing material possessions. He marries a woman who urges him to take back the plantation, but he still refuses when she attempts to convince him sexually. It is suggested there are no further conjugal relations between them after this as they have no children. Isaac tries to distribute fairly the money left to the children of Tomey's Turl and Tennie. He travels to Arkansas to give a thousand dollars to Lucas' sister, Fonsiba, now married to a scholarly negro farmer, who seems to neglect both his farm and wife. She refuses the money, but Isaac arranges for a nearby bank to pay it out in small monthly portions. Isaac continues to hunt and spend all the time he can in the woods.

One November, a few years later, he and a few of the old hunting group return to the wilderness camp where they had stalked Old Ben for so many years. Major de Spain has sold it to a logging company, and the trains come closer and louder than before. The wilderness is gradually being whittled away by farmers and loggers. Isaac visits the graves of Lion and Sam Fathers, then goes to find Boon Hogganbeck. Boon is in a clearing full of squirrels, trying to fix his gun. As Isaac enters, Boon shouts at him not to touch any of the squirrels: "They're mine!" he cries.

=== Publication history ===
"The Bear" has a complex publication history. Its earliest version, first published in The Saturday Evening Post (May 9, 1942), differs substantially from the Go Down, Moses version. A third version was published in Faulkner's collection of hunting stories, Big Woods (1955).

== "Delta Autumn" ==
=== Summary ===
This story serves as a sort of sequel or coda to "The Bear". Ike McCaslin and Roth Edmonds are in a car with some friends, headed for what Ike suspects will be the last of his annual hunting expeditions. The wilderness has receded in recent years, and it is now a long trip by automobile. Along the way they discuss the worsening situation in Europe, with Roth taking the cynic's view against Ike's idealism. At one point Roth slams on the brakes, as if he saw someone or something standing along the road. He seems preoccupied and out of sorts.

The men eventually arrive at their campsite and set it up under Ike's direction. During the night, the old man thinks about his bygone life and about how he and the wilderness are dying together.

The next morning the rest of the party set out to hunt while Ike chooses to sleep in. Roth gives him an envelope full of cash and mentions that a messenger might show up during the day. Ike is to hand over the money and “tell her I said ‘No.’” Later that morning a boat arrives. It carries a dark-eyed young woman with a baby wrapped in a blanket. Ike, ashamed of acting as a go-between in such a sordid matter, informs her that Roth has left and tries to thrust the money on her. She refuses to take it immediately, and remarks that Roth has abandoned her. Ike contemptuously asks how she could have expected anything different from him.

As the conversation goes on, it becomes clear that the young woman knows a great deal about Ike’s family and his own life, more than Roth would probably have told her; she is part of the family herself, a distant Beauchamp cousin. Ike is dismayed at the miscegenation, even though he imagines the human race might one day be ready for interracial alliances. He tells the woman to marry a man “of her own race” and go far away. She replies that he is hardly qualified to advise anyone about love and leaves with the money in her slicker's pocket and General Compson's horn.

Ike is still pondering this disturbing incident when one of his hunting companions runs in, frantically looking for a knife. The old hunter deduces that Roth has killed a doe and is trying to hide the evidence: another family sin that must be covered up.

=== Publication ===
"Delta Autumn" was published in Story (May/June 1942).

== "Go Down, Moses" ==
=== Summary ===
The book's final story begins with a census interview, which places the action in 1940. A well-dressed and well-spoken young black man identifies himself as Samuel Beauchamp, a native of Yoknapatawpha County. After completing the census form, he is led back to his cell on Death Row.

The action shifts to Jefferson, the Yoknapatawpha county seat. The protagonist is Gavin Stevens, a local attorney and amateur Biblical scholar and detective. Mollie Beauchamp (Lucas' wife) has had a premonition of harm involving her long-lost grandson, Samuel. She begs Stevens to discover his whereabouts and condition. Stevens pities the old woman and accepts the job for a token fee.

Stevens soon discovers that Samuel Beauchamp is due to be executed in Illinois within hours. Without quite understanding why, he donates and collects enough money to bring the young man's body home for a proper funeral. That evening, Stevens drops by the memorial service but quickly leaves, because he feels out of place. The funeral is held two days later.

=== Analysis ===
This is the shortest and most straightforward story in the book. The action is minimal. Its real importance lies in the fresh perspective it provides through Gavin Stevens, an educated and worldly man of the 20th century who would eventually become a key figure in Faulkner's later fiction. Stevens is like several other white characters in Go Down, Moses in that his impression of blacks in general is quite paternalistic and tradition-bound. He is, however, capable of change; at the story's end he experiences an epiphany when he learns that Mollie wants the funeral to be covered in the local newspaper "just like anyone else's". His realization ends the book on a somewhat hopeful note; perhaps the old cycle of exploitation and willful ignorance will not last forever after all.

Gavin Stevens also interacts with the Beauchamp family in the novel Intruder in the Dust (1948), in which he helps to save Lucas Beauchamp from a murder charge and a lynching. Some subtle clues seem to place that story a few years before "Go Down, Moses."

=== Publication ===
"Go Down, Moses" first appeared in Collier's (January 25, 1941).

== Reception and Legacy ==
While scholars have, at times, been divided about whether to approach Go Down, Moses as a collection of short stories or a novel (Glynn Custred refers to this as "one of Faulkner’s experiments with genre"), the book has come to be considered as an important entry in the Yoknapatawpha cycle, especially for studying Faulkner's complicated relationship with race in his work. Scholar Walker Taylor has written that the book "contains perhaps Faulkner's most comprehensive vision of the Negro's role in American history: a panorama of the effects of slavery and manumission on five generations of white and Negro descendants of a plantation patriarch", with the psychology of characters like Lucas Beachamp being thoroughly analyzed. However, as with The Unvanquished, some have viewed stories like "Pantaloon in Black" and "The Fire and the Hearth" as using its Black characters for comedy, depicting them from and for a White perspective, leading to Walter Taylor viewing the novel as a "failure".

For many, "The Bear" remains, by far, the standout story in Go Down, Moses, with Old Ben's role in the story being analyzed as a parable for "the loss of wilderness" while in Isaac McCaslin's storyline, like Quentin's in Absalom, Absalom, we see "the sins of the fathers passed down to the sons". The story is "often cited as Faulkner's most deliberate attempt to deal with the strongly 'environmental' issues like the disappearing wilderness and the prevalence of Southern hunting rituals".

Preceded by The Hamlet	Novels set in Yoknapatawpha County	Succeeded by Intruder in the Dust
