= Shingles for the Lord =

1943 short story by William Faulkner

"Shingles for the Lord" is a short story written by the American author William Faulkner, first published in The Saturday Evening Post in 1943. The story takes place in Faulkner's Yoknapatawpha County focusing on Res Grier, a struggling farmer, as he joins his neighbors in roofing the old church house and is narrated by his son in colloquial language. The story is on the surface a comic diversion, developing a plot similar to that of a situation comedy in which the attempt of one character to outsmart the others leads him to a sort of banishment or ostracism from which he must recuperate himself in order to reclaim his place in the community.
