= The Unvanquished =

1938 novel by William Faulkner

- First edition
- Author: William Faulkner
- Language: English
- Publisher: Random House
- Publication date: 1938
- Publication place: United States
- Media type: Print (hardback & paperback)
- OCLC: 23652115
- Dewey Decimal: 813/.52 20
- LC Class: PS3511.A86 U5 1991

The Unvanquished is a 1938 book of fiction by the American author William Faulkner, set in the fictional Yoknapatawpha County. In seven episodes, it tells the story of the Sartoris family, who first appeared in the novel Sartoris (or Flags in the Dust). The Unvanquished takes place before that story, and is set during the American Civil War.

== Structure ==
The Unvanquished has been variously described as a novel, a short story collection, and a short story cycle. It comprises seven chapters, all but one of which had already been published separately as short stories. Critics have disagreed over whether they come together sufficiently to make a novel. The seven stories, published in The Saturday Evening Post except where noted, are :

- "Ambuscade" (September 29, 1934)
- "Retreat" (October 13, 1934)
- "Raid" (November 3, 1934)
- "The Unvanquished" (namesake for the novel, in which it is titled "Riposte in Tertio") (November 14, 1936)
- "Vendée" (December 5, 1936)
- "Drusilla" (titled "Skirmish at Sartoris" in the novel), published in Scribner's (April 1935)
- "An Odor of Verbena" (never published prior to the release of the novel )

These seven episodes cover the years 1862 to 1873, sometimes immediately following one another in chronology, sometimes jumping months or years.

The principal characters are Bayard Sartoris, John Sartoris (Marse John, Father), Granny, Ringo (Morengo), Ab Snopes, Cousin Drusilla, Aunt Jenny, Louvinia, and the lieutenant (a Yankee soldier).

== Plot summary ==
The book begins with Bayard Sartoris and his slave friend Ringo playing in the dirt on the Sartoris plantation. A slave named Loosh smugly interrupts their game, hinting that Union armies have entered northeastern Mississippi, near their town of Jefferson. The boys do not fully understand, but when Bayard's father, Colonel John Sartoris, returns home from the front that day, they overhear him telling Granny Millard that Vicksburg has fallen. Loosh obviously knows about the defeat, and Bayard decides he and Ringo will keep watch over Loosh. Several days into the watch, the boys spot a Yankee soldier on horseback riding up the road. The boys grab a musket off the wall and shoot at the soldier, then run into the house as a fist pounds on the front door. Granny hides them under her billowing skirts and insists to the angry Union sergeant that there are no children present. Colonel Dick, a Yankee officer, calls off the search but makes it clear that he does so out of pity, not because he believes Granny. Afterward, the boys learn they only hit the horse, not the rider.

The next year, following Colonel Sartoris's instructions, Granny carries a heavy trunk of silver to Memphis for safekeeping. After digging the buried chest out of the ground, she insists that the slaves carry it up to her bedroom so she can watch it during the night. The journey to Memphis carries them through Union-occupied areas. One afternoon, men with guns waylay the travelers, stealing their mules despite Granny's attempts to fend them off. Bayard and Ringo take a horse from a nearby barn and try to pursue the attackers, leaving Granny to fend for herself. They are discovered asleep the next day by Colonel Sartoris's troop. Furious and anxious for Granny's well-being, the colonel sees them back to Jefferson personally; on the way, they accidentally overcome the thieves, a group of Northern soldiers, and capture their supplies, though the colonel allows the men to escape. Granny arrives home safely, but the next day a Union brigade rides to the house looking for Colonel Sartoris. He escapes, but the Yankees burn the house and take the chest of silver.

Granny decides to personally petition the Yankees to return her silver, slaves and mules. With Bayard and Ringo, she sets off for Alabama and the Union army. They pass an army of freed slaves that is also seeking out the Yankees. On the way, they stop at Hawkhurst, where Bayard's Aunt Louisa lives. Ringo had been looking forward to seeing the railroad that runs nearby. But the railroad has been destroyed and the house burned. At Hawkhurst, Bayard's cousin Drusilla begs him to ask his father to let her join the regiment as a soldier. She accompanies them to the river crossing where the Yankees are encamped, and they are engulfed in a sea of restless slaves. The Northern troops dynamite the bridge over the river, and in the confusion the wagon falls into the water. The Yankees retrieve them, however, and are so overburdened with slaves that Colonel Dick issues Granny an order for more than 100 slaves and mules, as well as for several chests of silver. Granny dismisses most of the slaves, but she and Ringo use the order to get twelve extra horses from a Union encampment.

The scam is quickly repeated, and after a year, Granny and Ringo have built a thriving trade in smuggled mules with the help of Ab Snopes, a poor local white. Ringo forges new orders and Granny uses them to requisition mules. Then, Ab sells the mules back to the clueless Yankees. They deliberate about a particularly risky opportunity and decide to go ahead, though Granny says she is uneasy. Her hesitation is justified: the Union army has issued a memo to be on the lookout for scams, and shortly after they leave camp the soldiers ride back to confront them. Granny has already given the mules to Ab for safekeeping, and when Ringo creates a diversion in the woods, Bayard and Granny simply vanish into the trees. Later that week, it becomes clear that Granny has not kept the profits for herself but has distributed them to keep other members of the community afloat.

At Christmas 1864, Ab tells Granny about a group of bandits led by an ex- Confederate named Grumby who are terrorizing the countryside. Ab convinces Granny to try out her scam one last time on Grumby and his men. Though Bayard tearfully tries to dissuade her, she insists on going, and is shot and killed by Grumby. After the funeral, Bayard sets off to seek revenge, accompanied by Ringo and a friend of his father's, Uncle Buck. Realizing that Ab Snopes has joined Grumby's party, they track them for two months throughout the area. They know they are getting closer when a well-dressed stranger who turns out to be one of Grumby's men shoots at them, wounding Uncle Buck; the next day they find Ab Snopes tied up in the road as a kind of sacrifice. The cowardly Ab begs for mercy, and they decide not to kill him; instead, Uncle Buck carries him back to town. Bayard and Ringo continue their pursuit, and before long, Grumby's associates decide to hand him over to the boys to placate them. Grumby and Bayard wrestle. Bayard is almost trapped, but he prevails and kills Grumby. The boys nail his body to the door of the cotton compress where Granny was killed, then cut off his hand and attach it to Granny's grave marker.

That spring, Drusilla has returned home from the war and is living in Jefferson with the Sartorises, dressing and acting mannish as she did while serving in the troops. Aunt Louisa is scandalized that Drusilla has been living with Colonel Sartoris and determines that they should marry. Aunt Louisa asks several respectable local women to take Drusilla in. The women cruelly offer sympathy for Drusilla's "condition," reducing Drusilla to tears. Before long Louisa arrives and, ignoring her daughter's protests, makes plans for the wedding. However, she has planned the wedding for the same day as a hotly contested election in Jefferson, in which Colonel Sartoris is attempting to stop a carpetbagger victory in the town. The day of the wedding, Drusilla rides into town to get married but ends up helping Colonel Sartoris face off against the two carpetbaggers, whom he shoots and kills. When she learns what has happened, Aunt Louisa is furious that the wedding has not taken place. Drusilla, the colonel and the townspeople ride to the Sartoris plantation to resume the election; not surprisingly, the Republican candidate, an ex-slave, loses.

Eight years later, Bayard is a law student at the University of Mississippi; once in the intervening years he has kissed Drusilla, who seems almost to be in love with him. One night Ringo rides to the university to tell him Colonel Sartoris has been killed by an ex-business partner and rival, Ben Redmond. Bayard will be expected to avenge his father and shoot Redmond. He rushes back to Jefferson, where Drusilla, in her yellow ball gown with a sprig of verbena in her hair, seems almost a priestess of revenge. She hands him a pair of dueling pistols, then breaks down in a hysterical fit of laughter. After Louvinia has led Drusilla to bed, Bayard's Aunt Jenny warns Bayard not to indulge in violence for its own sake. The next morning, Bayard rides into town with Ringo. A crowd gathers as he prepares to enter Redmond's office, but Bayard refuses offers of assistance from Ringo and of a pistol from a friend of his father's, George Wyatt. He enters Redmond's office; Redmond fires two shots at him, then takes his hat, walks across the square and boards a train out of Jefferson forever. The townspeople think Bayard has been killed; in fact, he has chosen to confront Redmond unarmed, breaking the cycle of violence without sacrificing his honor. When he returns home that evening, Drusilla has left for good. The only sign of her is a sprig of verbena she has left on his pillow.

Preceded by Absalom, Absalom!	Novels set in Yoknapatawpha County	Succeeded by The Hamlet
