= Mountain Victory =

- Short story by William Faulkner
- Country: United States
- Language: English
- Genre: Southern Gothic

Publication
- Published in: The Saturday Evening Post
- Publication date: December 3, 1932

"Mountain Victory" is a short story by American author William Faulkner first published under the title "A Mountain Victory" in the December 3, 1932 issue of The Saturday Evening Post. The story is unusual among Faulkner's works in that it takes place outside of his fictional Yoknapatawpha County. It deals with historical themes common to much of Faulkner's later work, including social and racial divisions in the South following the American Civil War.

== Plot summary ==
The story opens with Major Saucier Weddel, a wounded officer in the Confederate Army, and his black servant, Jubal, seeking shelter at a small cabin high in the mountains of Tennessee, formerly a Confederate state. With the Civil War at an end, Weddel believes that the time for killing is over, and wishes to return to his mansion in Mississippi. However, his occupation becomes a source of tension with the owners of the cabin, who are sympathetic toward the Union. Their oldest son, Vatch, who served in the Union Army, makes no secret of his hatred for rebels like Weddel, or for black people like Jubal. When Jubal drinks too much corn liquor and passes out, Weddel finds himself alone, surrounded by his enemies, in a land that is part of the South and yet seems to him to be far removed from the grace and gentility of the great plantations. The story concludes in a tragic finale that underscores both the futility of war and the difficulty of social change.

== Themes ==
Resistance to change

Despite the South's defeat in the war and his family's fallen fortunes, Major Weddel insists on carrying on the old traditions of gentility and honor. When his slave endangers his life, he has the opportunity to flee; instead, he stays to protect his property. On the other hand, the mountain family stubbornly clings to its racism, backwardness, and, paradoxically, its form of honor as well. The father insists on protecting the guests from his son's wrath and tries several times to warn the Confederate officer to leave before it is too late. By contrast, the daughter and the younger boy Hule are both enchanted by the idea of following Weddel back to Mississippi and sharing in his lavish lifestyle. Yet they too have a sense of honor. They insist that they will work hard and be loyal if he will only take them along. Even the least sympathetic character in the story, Vatch, displays some sense of honor at the end of the story, by pacing off a hundred yards before firing his long rifle at the Major and his slave.
