= Landing in Luck =

Short story by William Faulkner

"Landing in Luck" was William Faulkner's first published short story. Appearing in the November 26, 1919 issue of The Mississippian, a literary magazine at the University of Mississippi, "Landing in Luck" tells the story of Cadet Thompson, who is sent on a solo flight without adequate instruction. Thompson lands successfully, and his flight instructor, Bessing, takes credit for the fine job he did of teaching the cadet pilot. It is a fictional exaggeration based on Faulkner's experience as a cadet-pilot for the Royal Air Force (RAF) in 1918.

The setting of the story is likely Leaside Aerodrome in Toronto, Ontario. While a student at the School of Military Aeronautics at the University of Toronto in 1918, Faulkner had many opportunities to observe the operations at this airfield.

Opinion varies on the quality of "Landing in Luck": biographer Stephen B. Oates calls it "amusing", while another biographer labels the story "generic" and "without real depth".

== Analysis ==
Interpretations of the story vary widely. Parini finds the story "about a young man's false sense of accomplishment" and ascribes Thompson's feelings to Faulkner's "inner doubt"; the author, according to Parini, must have had the "feeling that the world sees more in him than he actually possesses". Frederick R. Karl says the story "establishes Faulkner as a teller of tall tales, a vivid and significant part of his artistic imagination and a centerpiece of his ludic imagination". It also is significant because in it, Faulkner sheds the "artificial language" that mars much of what he wrote as a young man.

The comic elements in the story foreshadow the humorous elements Faulkner often included in even his most serious fiction. The story also shows Faulkner's ability to spin the stuff of everyday life into an interesting tale. As a cadet-pilot, Faulkner probably never even flew a plane; his RAF unit was disbanded early in his training because World War I ended.

William Faulkner was not a WW I pilot, and did not learn to fly until the 1930s. His Instructor was Vernon C. Omlie, who also taught his brother, Dean, to fly. Dean later died when a wing folded at 4500 feet near Pontotoc, Mississippi in 1935.

"In the years following World War I, William Faulkner implied to his family and acquaintances that he had been a pilot in the RAF. Some people even thought that he had flown combat missions in France and had been wounded. He maintained this fictitious persona throughout his life, and it was accepted by most scholars and biographers. Several of Faulkner's early works featured aviators as central characters, and he treated them as romanticized, tragic heroes as he did Confederate cavalry officers. Pylon, which was written after he had actually started flying, reflects an awareness of the psychology of flying not seen in his earlier works. Faulkner's "wounded pilot" persona was only one facet of his imaginative and creative personality, but knowledge of this persona is necessary to the understanding of the man and thus his art."
