= Intruder in the Dust =

1948 novel by William Faulkner

- First edition cover (Random House)
- Author: William Faulkner
- Publisher: Random House
- Publication date: 1948
- Pages: 247

Intruder in the Dust is a 1948 crime novel written by American author William Faulkner. Taking place in Mississippi, it revolves around an African-American farmer accused of murdering a White man.

== Overview ==
The novel focuses on Lucas Beauchamp, a black farmer accused of murdering a white man. He is exonerated through the efforts of black and white teenagers and a spinster from a long-established Southern family. It was written as Faulkner's response as a Southern writer to the racial problems facing the South.

Intruder in the Dust is notable for its use of stream of consciousness style of narration. The novel also includes lengthy passages on the Southern memory of the American Civil War, one of which Shelby Foote quoted in Ken Burns' 1990 documentary The Civil War.

The characters of Lucas Beauchamp and his wife, Molly, first appeared in Faulkner's collection of short fiction, Go Down, Moses. A story by Faulkner, "Lucas Beauchamp", was published in 1999.

The character Gavin Stevens appears as a protagonist in Faulkner's short story collection Knight's Gambit (1949).

Intruder in the Dust was turned into a film of the same name directed by Clarence Brown in 1949 after MGM paid film rights of $50,000 to Faulkner. The film was shot in Faulkner's home town of Oxford, Mississippi. In 1949, Faulkner was awarded the Nobel Prize for Literature for "his powerful and artistically unique contribution to the modern American novel." The Nobel Prize was not specifically for his novel Intruder in the Dust but for the enduring contribution of his writing as a whole.

== Analysis ==
In her contemporary review of the novel, Eudora Welty noted its humor. Dayton Kohler's 1949 article noted the book's recognition of black Americans in the American south. John E. Bassett has commented that this novel represents a "serious attempt to explore contemporary Southern racism through Gavin and Chick." Jean E. Graham has discussed the contrasting rhetorical styles of Gavin and Chick throughout the course of the novel. Ticien Marie Sassoubre has examined the novel in the context of the social issues related to lynching in the American South, and then-recent American federal law with respect to black Americans.

D. Hutchinson has elucidated the unifying literary devices of the novel. Peter J. Rabinowitz analyzed Faulkner's use of the detective story in the context of the "discovery novel" as compared to Dostoyevsky.

Preceded by Go Down, Moses	Novels set in Yoknapatawpha County	Succeeded by The Town
