= Pylon (novel) =

1935 novel by William Faulkner

- First edition (publ. Smith & Haas)
- Author: William Faulkner
- Language: English
- Genre: modernist
- Publisher: Smith & Haas
- Publication date: 1935

Pylon is the eighth novel by the American author William Faulkner. Published in 1935, Pylon is set in New Valois, a fictionalized version of New Orleans. It is one of Faulkner's few novels set outside Yoknapatawpha County, his favorite fictional setting. Pylon is the story of a group of barnstormers whose lives are thoroughly unconventional. They live hand-to-mouth, always just a step or two ahead of destitution, and their interpersonal relationships are unorthodox and shocking by the standards of their society and times. They meet an overwrought and extremely emotional newspaperman in New Valois, who gets deeply involved with them, with tragic consequences.

The novel provided the basis for the 1957 film The Tarnished Angels.

== Characters ==
=== Main characters ===
- The Reporter – An alcoholic, dependent on loans from his editor. His interest in the romantic triangle that comprises the protagonists in the racing group — initially for a news story — becomes a fascination and finally an obsession, including a powerful but unrequited attraction to Laverne. He tries to help the trio but is ultimately responsible for the tragedy that destroys the group.
- Laverne Shumann – Mechanic and former wing-walker and parachute jumper. She is openly involved with both her husband, pilot Roger Shumann, and jumper Jack Holmes.
- Jack – Laverne's son (presumably by Roger Shumann). His actual parentage is undetermined. The reporter nicknames him "Dempsey" because of his willingness to fight anyone who asks him, "Who's your old man?"
- Roger Shumann – Racing pilot, and presumptive father of Jack, whose quiet competence and acceptance of great risk largely supports the family.
- Jack Holmes – A show jumper and Laverne's lover. Possible father to little Jack.
- Jiggs – Main mechanic. Jiggs' obsession over a pair of cowboy boots in a store window opens the novel. His alcoholic binge (catalyzed by the Reporter) boosts the story toward its ultimate tragedy.

=== Minor characters ===
- Matt Ord – Legendary pilot, known throughout the world of aviation and barnstorming. More or less retired from flying, he is part owner of Ord-Atkinson Aircraft Corp. Provides Roger Shumann with an airplane. (Probably a loose combination of both Matty Laird and Jimmy Weddell of Weddell-Williams Flying Service of Patterson, La.)
- Dr. (Carl) and Mrs. Shumann – Roger Shumann's parents, who live in Myron, Ohio. Dr. Shumann had wanted his son to be a physician.
- Col. Feinman – New Valois mogul and chairman of the sewage board, who owns the airport where much of the novel's action takes place. (Probably loosely modeled after Levee Board president Abraham Shushan, for whom Shushan Airport — later New Orleans' Lakefront Airport — was originally named.)

== Reception ==
A review for The New York Times called Pylon "powerfully told" and praised it from departing from Faulkner's usual themes in his works.

In general, the novel received warm reviews upon release; however, it has since been forgotten, and is considered one of Faulkner's failures. Pylon has also been criticized for over-reliance on the work of T. S. Eliot. One reviewer described Pylon as a "literary vision of apocalypse" and criticized its chaotic and disorganized structure.
