= The Tall Men (short story) =

"The Tall Men" is a short story written by William Faulkner in 1941.

== Plot summary ==
The story is set during the last years of the Great Depression, as the country readies itself for possible entry into World War II. It begins with two men visiting a house in Jefferson to serve a warrant for the two McCallum brothers, who have not registered for selective service (draft evasion.) One of the officials, a local marshal, holds an affinity for the family, a member of whom has been involved in a terrible accident at work. The other official, Pearson, a draft investigator, is anxious to act according to his preconceptions regarding "country people" and arrest the brothers so he can catch his returning train. The investigator's original plan is thwarted by the local marshal who has already told the two men to expect to be arrested. This irks Pearson.

Pearson muses about the local situation and his contempt for those living on public welfare. Pearson also encounters the McCallum's uncle and father, agricultural laborers and, in the case of the father, a World War I veteran. The elder McCallums talk of not taking anything from anyone but giving freely and of their refusal to accept crop subsidies. Their circumvention of being rewarded for no service lies in direct opposition to the opinion expressed earlier by Pearson.

The investigator then finds himself burying an amputated leg with the marshal, who politely but forcefully insinuates his support for the family's approach to the law. Pearson is forced to confront the truth that there are some who do not shirk duty as much as embrace it to such a degree that mere government directives pale in comparison.
