= Mosquitoes (novel) =

1927 novel by William Faulkner

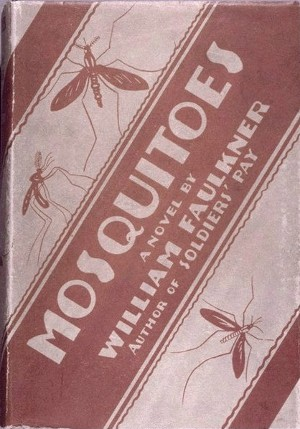
- First edition cover
- Author: William Faulkner
- Language: English
- Publisher: Boni & Liveright
- Publication date: 1927
- Publication place: United States
- Pages: 349 pages

Mosquitoes is a satiric novel by the American author William Faulkner. The book was first published in 1927 by the New York-based publishing house Boni & Liveright and is the author's second novel. Sources conflict regarding whether Faulkner wrote Mosquitoes during his time living in Paris beginning in 1925 or in Pascagoula, Mississippi, in the summer of 1926. Its setting and content clearly reference Faulkner's personal involvement in the New Orleans creative community where he spent time before moving to France.

The city of New Orleans and a yacht on Lake Pontchartrain are the two primary settings for the novel. Beginning and ending in the city, the story follows a diverse cast of artists, aesthetes, and adolescents as they embark on a four-day excursion aboard the motorized yacht, the Nausikaa, owned by a wealthy patron of the arts.

The novel is organized into six sections: a prologue which introduces the characters, four body sections each of which documents a day of the yacht trip hour-by-hour, and an epilogue which returns the characters, changed or unchanged, to their lives on land.

The novel's U.S. copyright expired on January 1, 2023, when all works published in 1927 entered the public domain.

== Plot ==
=== Prologue ===
Mosquitoes opens in the apartment of one of the story's main characters, a reserved and dedicated sculptor named Gordon. Ernest Talliaferro, a friend of the artist, joins him in the apartment, watching intently as Gordon chisels away at a sculpture. Talliaferro engages the sculptor in a largely one-sided 'conversation' about his abilities with women. The artist works around the chatty Talliaferro, indifferently agreeing with every claim and question, yet declines the offer to attend an evidently aforementioned boat trip hosted by the wealthy Mrs. Maurier.

Leaving the apartment to get a bottle of milk for Gordon, he meets Mrs. Maurier, the hostess of the upcoming yachting trip, who is accompanied by her niece, Pat. A quick return to Gordon's apartment follows where Mrs. Maurier personally extends the offer for him to join the yachting excursion. Though Gordon maintains a distant and uninterested aura, it becomes evident through the stream-of-consciousness passages that follow that he is at odds with himself over his sudden attraction to Pat that changes his mind about the trip.

When Talliaferro takes leave of Gordon and the women, his path through the city and the paths of other characters that diverge in his wake serve to introduce the multifaceted New Orleans artistic community around which the plot focuses. At a dinner that follows, Talliaferro's visit with Gordon, the conversations about art that ensue as well as the sexual tensions that are hinted at in the interactions of Talliaferro, Julius Kaufmann, and Dawson Fairchild set the stage for the interactions and themes that come to typify rest of the novel.

=== The First Day ===
The second section opens as Mrs. Maurier welcomes all her guests onto the Nausikaa. The cast of characters in attendance is diverse and is typologically split into artists, non-artists, and youths. Though it, at first provides a chronological foundation to the activities that Mrs. Maurier has planned for her guests, it becomes evident that her guests, especially the men, are uncontrollable and more interested in drinking whisky in their rooms while gossiping about women and discussing art, than in participating in any activity she offers. The first day on the yacht concludes with a minor cliffhanger when Mr. Talliaferro makes it known that he has his sights set on one of the women on the ship, but only speaks her name behind closed doors.

=== The Second Day ===
During the second day the activities on the boat take an even further backseat to the development of the characters and their interactions with one another. Similar conversations among the men over drinks continue, but the second day of the trip becomes largely defined by interactions between pairs of characters that result in misguided sexual tension that is fostered between them. Mrs. Jameson's advances on Pete, for instance, go unnoticed or unreciprocated by the young man. Similarly, Mr. Talliaferro's interest in Jenny grows, though as is always the case with him, he is not able to realize any relationship with the girl. Mrs. Maurier shares in the disappointment of unrequited love as she watches all of the men on the boat fawn over Jenny and Pat. These two objects of male gaze share their own brief sexually charged interaction as they lie together in the room they share. The only openly reciprocal feelings that seem to develop over the course of the day are between Pat and the nervous steward, David West, who she goes to meet for a midnight swim after her intimate encounter with Jenny. Two scenes diametrically opposed conclude the chapter as David West and Pat return in youthful joy from a midnight swim off of the now marooned boat, while Mrs. Maurier lies in bed sobbing in her loneliness.

=== The Third Day ===
The third day on the yacht begins as Pat and David decide to leave the boat and elope to the town of Mandeville. The chapter cuts back and forth between the characters on the boat and Pat and David as they make their way through a seemingly endless swamp to their intended destination. The sexual advances and artistic discussion continue among characters on the boat. The most notable change in this chapter is the dominant role Mrs. Wiseman comes to play both in her sexual exploits and in her display of intelligence. Mrs. Wiseman's interest in Jenny is evident in her ever-present gaze upon the girl. Prior to this chapter, conversations on the merits of artistic production took place almost exclusively among the male passengers of the boat, but now, following her revealed gaze upon Jenny, Mrs. Wiseman holds a strong place in a debate between Fairchild, Julius, and Mark Frost. Mrs. Maurier too is present, but her idealistic thoughts on the "art of Life" are hardly heard.

Eventually growing tired of talking, sitting, and eating, the passengers on the boat join together to try to pull the boat from where it is marooned. Their struggle to release the boat is mirrored by the Pat and David's struggle for survival as they continue to trudge, dehydrated through the swamp. Failing to free the boat, the characters return to the yacht and the brief reprieve from explorations of sexuality and art ends. These main themes return quickly as Mrs. Wiseman kisses Jenny and the rest of the men return to drinking and talking. Pat and David soon return and everything returns to normal by the end of the day.

=== The Fourth Day ===
The fourth day opens and David is gone again in pursuit of a better job. The excitement of the third day has vanished. The boat still stranded and no one knows where Gordon has gone. Eventually the same man who brought back Pat and David also brings Gordon back and everyone is once again accounted for. With David out of the way, Gordon is finally given a chance to explore his attraction to Pat that brought him on the boating trip in the first place. They get in an argument that ends in an unusual manner with him spanking her like a child. Thereafter however, she lies in his arms and they get to know one another. The tugboat comes and frees the marooned yacht and everyone, including Gordon, spends the evening dancing. Mr. Talliaferro falls victim to a trick by Fairchild and Julius that leads him into a room which he thinks is Jenny's but is in fact Mrs. Maurier, to whom he is now apparently engaged.

=== Epilogue ===
The epilogue follows the Nausikaa's passengers onto land and back into their individual lives, tying up many loose ends. Jenny and Pete return to their families. Major Ayers attends a meeting to propose an invention of digestive salts continually mentioned throughout the story. Mark Frost and Mrs. Jameson, the two unimaginative artists, find love in each other and begin a relationship. Gordon, Julius, and Fairchild have one last discussion of art and Gordon reveals that he has shifted from working with marble to clay and has molded from it a likeness Mrs. Maurier, much departed from his prior artistic obsession with representing the young female nude that he worked on in the beginning of the book. In the last section, Mr. Talliaferro visits Fairchild, distressed again by his ineptitude with women. After returning home, Talliaferro comes to what he thinks is a revelation regarding how he can be more successful with women. The novel ends as he tries to call Fairchild, but on the other end is only the operator, who says sarcastically "You tell 'em, big boy; treat 'em rough."

== Characters ==
=== Main characters ===
- Ernest Talliaferro is a 38-year-old widower of eight years who is entrenched in the New Orleans artistic community, yet is not an artist himself. His entire persona is a calculated construction, having changed his name from "Tarver" and even speaking with an affected cockney accent that he picked up once on a brief trip to Europe. He works as a wholesale buyer of women's clothes, a profession that leads him to believe he has a honed knowledge of women's wants and needs. Ever unsure of himself and his abilities with the opposite sex, however, he spends much of the book talking about or comically attempting to foster relations that never come to fruition.
- Gordon is a tall, muscular, arrogant, and often socially disconnected sculptor who is dedicated to none but his work. His character is considered by critics to represent the Faulkner's idea of a "true artist."
- Dawson Fairchild is an established novelist in the New Orleans originally from Ohio. Outgoing, friendly, and full of opinions that he is not afraid to share, he fills an artist typology opposite to that of Gordon. His character is considered a satirical portrayal of the novelist Sherwood Anderson, one of Faulkner's mentors early in his career (for more information on this connection see below – Mosquitoes and its Historical Foundations in Faulkner's Life).
- Julius Kauffman is an art critic and brother to the poet Eva Kaufmann Wiseman. He is referred to throughout the book as either "Julius" or "the Semitic Man" and is endlessly engaged in discussions about the value of art with Dawson Fairchild, often denouncing art as a "pale comparison to actual life experience."
- Mrs. Patricia Maurier is a wealthy and aging widow who hosts the four-day boating excursion that sets the scene for the greater part of the book. Depicted as a patron of the arts, her interest in the artistic community is overbearing to a point it seems almost a forced cover-up for other unspoken insecurities. As the story progresses, it becomes clear that she, like Mr. Talliaferro is constantly seeking love, but never finds it.
- Patricia "Pat" Robyn is the niece of Mrs. Maurier and twin sister of Josh. She is characterized by her youthful passion for life and her ever-curious nature. Her androgynous, youthful body becomes an object of both male and female desire throughout the book, especially for Gordon.
- Theodore "Josh" Robyn is the nephew of Mrs. Maurier and the twin brother of Pat and will be attending Yale in the coming year. Much like Gordon, Josh is a reserved character in the book who, though not considered among the artists in the group, is the only character who crafts any physical creative work while on the ship, always preoccupied with fashioning a pipe from a cylinder of wood.
- Eva Kauffman Wiseman is a lesbian poet and sister to Julius Kaufmann II. Between her lust for Jenny's youth and her unique and insightful contributions to the primarily male-dominated artistic discussions, Wiseman plays a primary role in the novel's exploration of gender roles and sexuality.
- Mark Frost is a young, gaunt poet who joins the group on the Nausikaa. Self-proclaimed as the best poet in New Orleans yet lazy and disengaged, he does little to live up to this title.
- Dorothy Jameson is a painter of vapid still lifes, and is similarly unprolific in her trade as Mark Frost is in his. They represent each other's counterparts, proud self-proclaimed artists who are in actuality mere hangers-on, to the productive artists represented by Gordon and Fairchild.
- Major Ayers is a British businessman aboard the Nausikaa.
- Genevieve "Jenny" Steinbauer is a youthful girl whom Patricia meets in town and invites on the excursion last minute. She, like Pat, becomes an object of sexual desire for various characters throughout the book.
- Pete Ginotta is Jenny's boyfriend. Though Mrs. Jameson shows a physical attraction to Pete early on, he primarily fills a background role with little personality while on the boat, it is not until the epilogue that his background is explained. He comes from a simple Italian family who experienced a "phoenix-like" rise to success in the restaurant business.
- David West is the steward aboard the Nausikaa. Referred to throughout the book as "the steward" or "David," his character goes unnoticed in the book until Pat acknowledges him. He assumes a larger role in the book when he and Pat elope, setting their sights on the near-by town of Mandeville yet reach no destination before dehydration forces them to return to the boat.

=== Minor characters ===
- Faulkner has a famous cameo appearance in the story in a conversation between Jenny and Pat as a "funny man" she met once who claimed to be a "liar by profession" who made good money doing it.
- Henry "Hank" Robyn is the father of Pat and Josh Robyn.
- Joe Ginotta is the brother of Pete Ginotta who enters the story only at the end when Pete returns home.
- Mrs. Ginotta is the mother of Pete Ginotta. She also appears first in the epilogue when Pete returns home.

== Foundations in Faulkner's life ==
Inspiration for Mosquitoes has been traced to a specific yachting excursion in Faulkner's life that took place in April, 1925 on Lake Pontchartrain. Attendees were members of the real-life New Orleans' artistic community and included artist William Spratling, novelist Hamilton Basso, and novelist and short-story writer Sherwood Anderson.

Though the parallels between this trip and the fictive one documented in Mosquitoes make it evident that it was the inspiration for the novel's setting, it has been further noted by many critics and readers of Faulkner that direct references to Faulkner's life do not end here. Dawson Fairchild's character, for example, is known to be a satirical portrait of his mentor Sherwood Anderson and is cited to be the reason for his falling-out with Faulkner.

== Significant deletions of text by the publisher ==
Though not regarded as an extremely cohesive story, in reading Mosquitoes, textual disjointedness is especially evident in a few sections. This is due to the four significant edits by Boni & Liveright in 1927 prior to the book's publication. Sex and sexuality play a significant part in the discussions and interactions of the characters in Mosquitoes. Though the book as published does explore various erotic scenes and notions including lesbianism, four major sections were cut from the book and survive now only in Faulkner's original typescript preserved by the University of Virginia Alderman Library. Faulkner scholar Minrose Gwin suggests that the publisher drew the line at these four scenes due to their explicit explorations of homoeroticism. Where there are many instances of implied homoerotic, and more specifically lesbian, feelings and actions, these excised scenes most likely stretched the taboo displays of sexuality too far to be published in the 1920s. It was among the books to have been banned in Boston.

== Major themes ==
The hour-by-hour, day-by-day organization of the novel suggests, in form as well as function, the nature of the repetitive and mundane days spent on the cruise ship. By grounding the repetitive activities of the characters in concrete temporal divisions, Faulkner gives structure to what might otherwise seem to be an endless stream of conversation and interaction between various combinations of the yacht's passengers.

This intentionally mundane structure also forces the boat and the preoccupations of the passengers (swimming, dancing, eating, etc.) to become a stage for the characters' primary function as "thinly veiled mouthpieces [that] function as rhetorical devices" through which Faulkner is able to work through major issues that he struggled to understand in his own life. He does this by inhabiting the characters' various personas to address these themes either through their overt discussions or hidden thoughts. Regardless of how individual characters explore the themes, readers have access to them through Faulkner's omniscient third-person narration.

Though many views on the contemporary culture of the 1920s American south could be drawn from the endless cultural references in Faulkner's writing, two major themes manifest in the text and are explored both individually and in terms of their relation to one another. These are Faulkner's explorations of sex and sexuality and of the societal role of the artist.

=== Sex and sexuality ===
The opening line of Mosquitoes, where Talliaferro comically discusses the prowess of his "sex instinct," immediately introduces discussions of and allusions to sex and sexuality, a theme that plays a significant part in the interactions and conversations among characters in the novel. By trapping his characters on the Nausikaa for much of the book, Faulkner establishes a means of exploring a wide variety of sexual relationships as well as a way of questioning heterosexual gender roles. Due to their prevalence in the published book as well as the more explicit portions of the book that were excised before publication, many scholars have put forth views on why sex and sexuality play such a significant role in the novel. Some ascribe the explorations as merely a poeticized documentation of the various character types he witnessed during his time in New Orleans' bohemian community, a "site of flamboyant sexual masquerade and activity of all sorts." Scholars like Minrose Gwin, however, believe that this exploration had a deeper connection to Faulkner's personal experiences, arguing that he wished to put in question the period's culturally compulsory heterosexual norms. Faulkner breaks down these norms, bringing into conversation not only female homosexuality, but, perhaps more importantly, representations of ambiguously androgynous roles of characters that could serve to foster more discussion on the topic than the shock that the direct depictions of female homosexuality most likely caused. These roles were especially filled by Pat, with her androgynous, youthful body and unclear sexual orientation, as well as through the masculine role assumed by Eva Wiseman in many of the discussions surrounding artistic practice.

=== The Societal Role of the Artist ===
Coupled with, and seemingly inseparable from, Faulkner's exploration of sexuality is his attempt to home in on the roles of both art and 'the artist' in society. Though often clouded by the endless conversations of little value among characters not dedicated to art, it is evident that Faulkner attempts to use Mosquitoes to determine what it means to be an artist. Though many artists appear in the novel, the frequent portrayal of the Gordon-Julius-Fairchild trio makes it evident that these characters are the focus of the novel's examination of the role of the artist. Combined with the discussions of sex and sexuality, the reader notes that each of these men begins the novel inhabiting very distinct and disparate ways of interacting with the creative world: the quiet self-absorbed artist, the cynical critic, and the talkative author respectively. As the novel progresses, minor changes are witnessed in each of these characters, and upon their return from the yachting trip they, the only respectable artists are those who have changed, growing more similar to each other throughout the course of the trip. These changes mark Faulkner's more honed view of determining what it means to be an artist, simultaneously dedicated to his work, critical of his abilities, and engaged in the world outside his writing.

== Critical response ==
Mosquitoes did not receive notable critical response at the time of its publishing, but following Faulkner's rise to a place of prominence in American Literature, the book has garnered a significant body of reviews, interpretations, and analyses.

With few exceptions, critics of Faulkner consider Mosquitoes to be his weakest and also most imitative work, citing his use of the literary styles of Aldous Huxley, T.S. Eliot, and James Joyce. Following this observation of Mosquitoes' imitative qualities, the book has also been considered by many to represent a period in Faulkner's life where he begins to cultivate, though not yet successfully, the personal literary style for which he later becomes famous. Critics cite his preoccupation with the themes discussed above, which he had attempted to work through prior to Mosquitoes in a few unpublished works as the primary distractions from his ability to hone his own style during this period.

One unique stance on the otherwise vastly disparaged Mosquitoes is furthered by Kenneth Hepburn in his 1971 article "Faulkner's Mosquitoes: A Poetic Turning Point". Though he makes sure to claim that he does not argue for the "reappraisal of Mosquitoes as a work of great quality," Hepburn argues that the novel has much more merit than had previously been assigned by academics. Focusing on two sections in the epilogue of the novel, Hepburn argues that instead of a confused and inconclusive statement on the role of the artist in society, the final actions of Gordon, Julius, and Fairchild each represent parts of a whole that must be read together to understand Faulkner's ultimate conclusion on what an artist should be. Hepburn furthers this argument by bringing about his final conclusion that due to this exploration and eventual comfortable conclusion on the role of the artist, Mosquitoes allowed for Faulkner's liberation from his attempt to fill the role of the "idealized poet," and let him come into his own as a great American author.

Another uniquely positive interpretation of the novel is put forth by Ted Atkinson in his 2001 article "Faulkner's Mosquitoes: A cultural history." Like Hepburn, his argument does not try to boost the novel to acclaim as a great work of literature, but rather argues for its foresight into the rising discussions of cultural politics at the time.

== Bibliography ==
Sources

- Atkinson, Ted. "Aesthetic Ideology in Faulkner's Mosquitoes: A Cultural History." Faulkner Journal 17 (2001). 3-18. ProQuest.
- Bassett, John Earl. "Faulkner's Mosquitoes: Toward a Self-Image of the Artist." The Southern Literary Journal 12 (Spring, 1980): 49-64. JSTOR.
- Bassett, John Earl. William Faulkner: An Annotated Bibliography of Criticism Since 1988. Lanham, MD: Scarecrow Press, Inc. 2009.
- Dunlap, Mary M., "Sex and the Artist in Mosquitoes Mississippi Quarterly 22 (Summer, 1969) 190-206. ProQuest.
- Faulkner, William. Mosquitoes. New York: Boni & Liveright, 1927.
- Gwin, Minrose C. "Did Ernest Like Gordon?" In Faulkner and Gender, edited by Donald M. Kartiganer and Ann J. Abadie, 121-144. Jackson, MS: University Press of Mississippi, 1996.
- Hepburn, Kenneth Wm.. "Mosquitoes: A Poetic Turning Point." Twentieth Century Literature 17 (Jan. 1971): 19-28. JSTOR.
- McDowell, Edwin. "Faulkner Manuscript is Bought," New York Times, October 10, 1987. Accessed May 12, 2012. ProQuest.
- Millgate, Michael. The Achievement of William Faulkner. New York: Vintage, 1963.
- Person, James E. Jr., "Quest for Community." National Review (April 24, 2006). 58-59. ProQuest.

For a more exhaustive list of published commentary and criticism on Faulkner's Mosquitoes consult John E. Bassett's William Faulkner: An Annotated Bibliography of Criticism since 1988 (ISBN 978-0-8108-6741-3).
