= A Fable =

1954 novel by William Faulkner

- First edition cover
- Author: William Faulkner
- Cover artist: Riki Levinson
- Language: English
- Published: 1954 (Random House)
- Publication place: United States
- Media type: Print (hardback & paperback)
- Pages: 437
- Preceded by: Requiem for a Nun
- Followed by: The Town

A Fable is a 1954 novel written by the American author William Faulkner. He spent more than a decade and tremendous effort on it, and aspired for it to be "the best work of my life and maybe of my time". It won the Pulitzer Prize and the National Book Award. Historically, it can be seen as a precursor to Joseph Heller's Catch-22.

== Synopsis ==
The book takes place in France during World War I and stretches through the course of one week in 1918. Corporal Stefan, who represents the reincarnation of Jesus, orders 3,000 troops to disobey orders to attack in the brutally repetitive trench warfare. In return, the Germans do not attack, and the war stops when soldiers realize that it takes two sides to fight a war. The Generalissimo, who represents leaders who use war to gain power, invites his German counterpart to discuss how to restart the war. He then arrests and executes Stefan. Before Stefan's execution, the Generalissimo tries to convince the corporal that war can never be stopped because it is the essence of human nature.

Following the execution of the Corporal, his body is returned to his wife and his sisters, and he is buried in Vienne-la-pucelle. However, after the conflict has resumed, the Corporal's grave is destroyed in a barrage of artillery. The spirit of the Corporal has transferred to a British message runner, who eventually confronts the old Generalissimo.

== Critical analysis ==
In his contemporary review of A Fable, Philip Blair Rice noted that the novel returned Faulkner in subject matter to the one general subject that engaged him besides Mississippi: the First World War. Dayton Kohler, in his contemporary analysis of the novel, discusses an approach to the novel through myth. Ernest Sandeen has elaborated in detail on the parallels between the corporal and Jesus Christ. Julian Smith has noted similarities between A Fable and Humphrey Cobb's novel Paths of Glory. Frank Turaj has examined opposing images and themes in terms of the dialectic in the novel. Thomas E Connolly has discussed the relationship of the three main plots of the novel to each other.

Richard H. King has interpreted A Fable as the one major attempt by Faulkner to depict political action in his novels, and has characterized the novel as "Faulkner's failed political novel". Robert W Hutten noted Faulkner's reworking of material originally from the story "Notes on a Horse Thief" into A Fable. William J Sowder has analyzed in detail the character of the Generalissimo.

== Awards ==
- 1955 Pulitzer Prize for Fiction
- 1955 National Book Award for Fiction
