= Oxford, Mississippi =

City in Mississippi, United States

- City
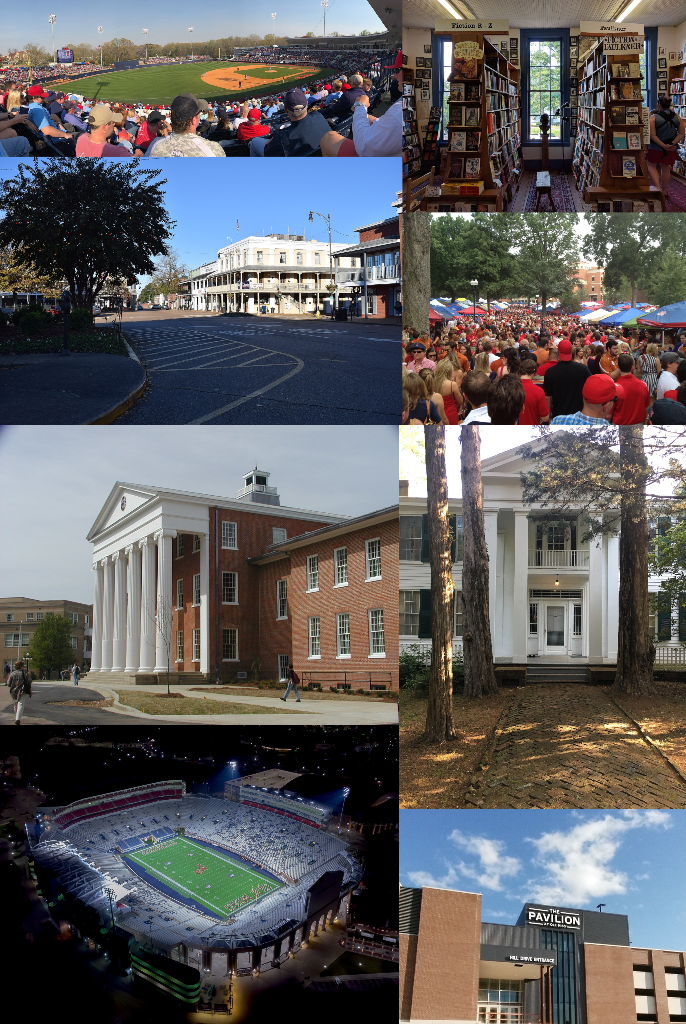
- From top, left to right: Swayze Field, Square Books, Oxford's downtown Square, The Grove at Ole Miss, The Lyceum at the University of Mississippi, Rowan Oak, Vaught–Hemingway Stadium, The Sandy and John Black Pavilion at Ole Miss

- Flag Logo

- Location of Oxford, Mississippi

- Location in the United States
- Coordinates: 34°22′20″N 89°30′29″W
- Country: United States
- State: Mississippi
- County: Lafayette
- Named for: Oxford, England

Government
  - Mayor: Robyn Tannehill (I)

Area
  - Total: 26.71 sq mi (69.18 km^{2})
  - Land: 26.62 sq mi (68.94 km^{2})
  - Water: 0.093 sq mi (0.24 km^{2})
- Elevation: 449 ft (137 m)

Population (2020)
  - Total: 25,416
  - Density: 954.9/sq mi (368.68/km^{2})
- Time zone: UTC−6 (Central (CST))
  - Summer (DST): UTC−5 (CDT)
- ZIP Code: 38655
- Area code: 662
- FIPS code: 28-54840
- GNIS feature ID: 2404454
- Website: oxfordms.net

Oxford is the 14th most populous city in Mississippi, United States, and the county seat of Lafayette County, 75 miles (121 km) southeast of Memphis. A college town, Oxford surrounds the University of Mississippi or "Ole Miss". Founded in 1837, the city is named after Oxford, England.

Purchasing the land from a Chickasaw, pioneers founded Oxford in 1837. In 1841, the Mississippi State Legislature selected it as the site of the state's first university, Ole Miss. Oxford is also the hometown of Nobel Prize-winning novelist William Faulkner, and served as the inspiration for his fictional Jefferson in Yoknapatawpha County. Lucius Quintus Cincinnatus Lamar, who served as a US Supreme Court Justice and Secretary of the Interior, also lived and is buried in Oxford.

At the 2020 US Census, the population was 25,416.

== History ==
=== 19th century ===
Oxford and Lafayette County were formed from lands ceded by the Chickasaw people in the Treaty of Pontotoc Creek in 1832. The county was organized in 1836, and in 1837 three pioneers—John Martin, John Chisom, and John Craig—purchased land from Hoka, a female Chickasaw landowner, as a site for the town. They named it "Oxford", intending to promote it as a center of learning in the Old Southwest. In 1841, the Mississippi legislature selected Oxford as the site of the state university, which opened in 1848. Union Female College opened there in 1853.

During the American Civil War, Oxford was occupied by Union Army troops under Generals Ulysses S. Grant and William T. Sherman in 1862; in 1864 Major General Andrew Jackson Smith burned the buildings in the town square, including the county courthouse. In the postwar Reconstruction era, the town recovered slowly, aided by federal judge Robert Andrews Hill, who secured funds to build a new courthouse in 1872.

During this period many African American freedmen moved from farms into town and established a neighborhood known as "Freedmen Town", where they built houses, businesses, churches and schools, and exercised all the rights of U.S. citizenship. Even after Mississippi disenfranchised most African Americans in the 1890 Constitution of Mississippi, they continued to build their lives in the face of discrimination.

=== 20th century ===
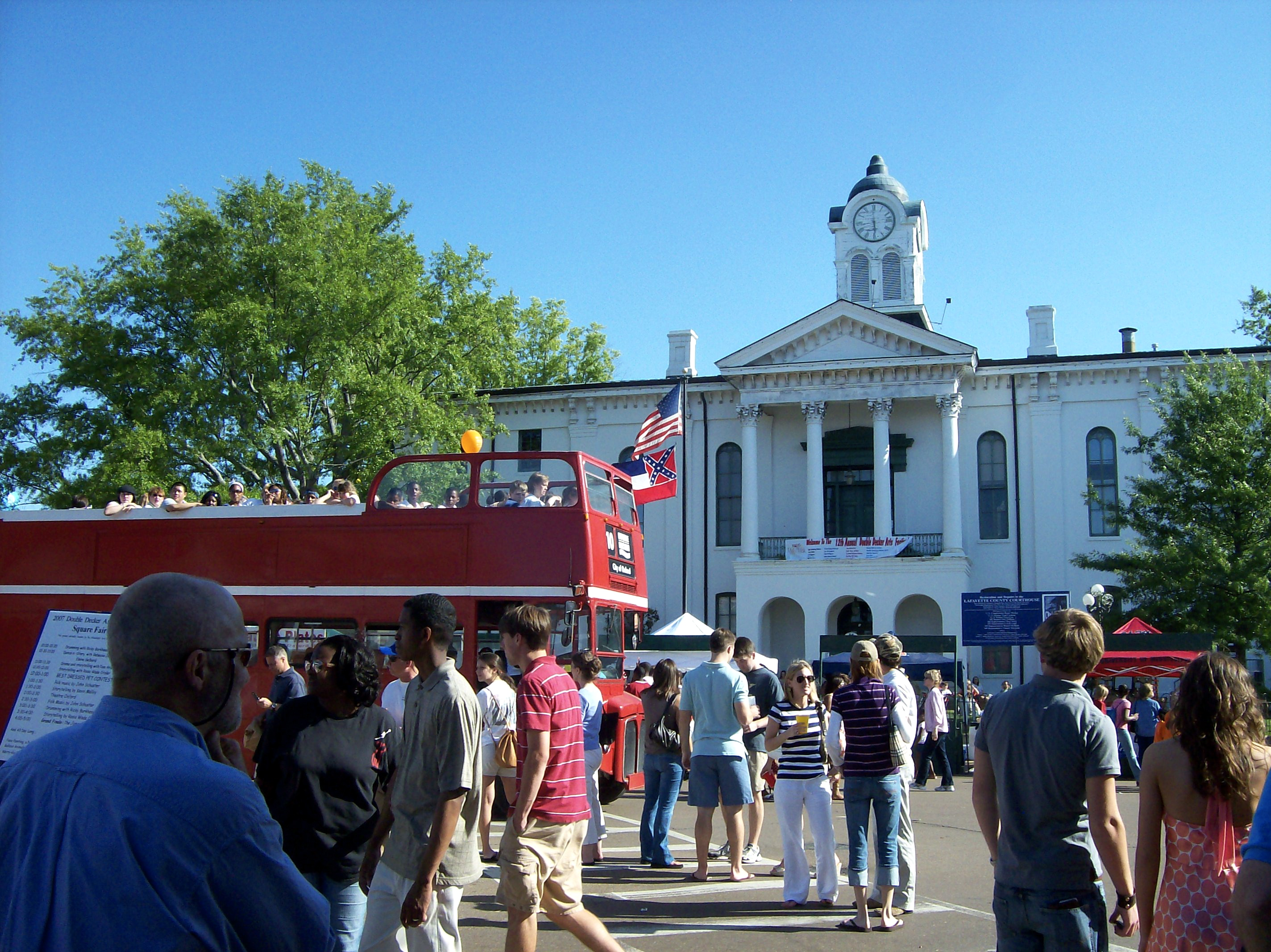
A double-decker tourist bus and the former Mississippi state flag beside the Lafayette County Courthouse in Oxford, during the 2007 Double Decker Festival.

During the Civil Rights Movement, Oxford drew national attention in the Ole Miss riot of 1962. State officials, including Governor Ross Barnett, prevented James Meredith, an African American, from enrolling at the University of Mississippi, even after the federal courts had ruled that he be admitted. Following secret face-saving negotiations with Barnett, President John F. Kennedy ordered 127 U.S. Marshals, 316 deputized U.S. Border Patrol agents and 97 federalized Federal Bureau of Prisons officers to accompany Meredith. Thousands of armed "volunteers" flowed into the Oxford area. Meredith traveled to Oxford under armed guard to register, but riots by segregationists broke out in protest of his admittance.

That night, cars were burned, federal law enforcement were pelted with rocks, bricks and small arms fire, and university property was damaged by 3,000 rioters. Two civilians were killed by gunshot wounds, and the riot spread into adjacent areas of the city of Oxford. Order was finally restored to the campus with the early morning arrival of 3,000 nationalized Mississippi National Guard and federal troops, who camped in the city.

Wal-Mart opening a location in Oxford in 1984

=== 21st century ===
More than 3,000 journalists came to Oxford on September 26, 2008, to cover the first presidential debate of 2008, which was held at the University of Mississippi.

== Geography ==
Oxford is in central Lafayette County in northern Mississippi, about 75 miles (121 km) south-southeast of Memphis, Tennessee.

According to the United States Census Bureau, the city has a total area of 26.7 square miles (69.2 km^{2}), of which 26.6 square miles (68.9 km^{2}) are land and 0.1 square miles (0.2 km^{2}), or 0.35%, is water. The campus of the University of Mississippi, west of downtown, is an unincorporated area named University, Mississippi, which is fully surrounded by the city.

The city is located in the North Central Hills region of Mississippi. The region is known for its heavily forested hills made up of red clay. The area is higher and greater in relief than areas to the west (such as the Mississippi Delta or loess bluffs along the Delta), but lower in elevation than areas in northeast Mississippi. The changes in elevation can be noticed when traveling on the Highway 6 bypass, since the east-west highway tends to transect many of the north-south ridges. Downtown Oxford sits on one of these ridges and the University of Mississippi sits on another one, while the main commercial corridors on either side of the city sit in valleys.

Oxford is located at the confluence of highways from eight directions: Mississippi Highway 6 (now co-signed with US-278) runs west 25 miles (40 km) to Batesville and east 31 miles (50 km) to Pontotoc; Highway 7 runs north 30 miles (48 km) to Holly Springs and south 18 miles (29 km) to Water Valley. Highway 30 goes northeast 33 miles (53 km) to New Albany; Highway 334 ("Old Highway 6") leads southeast 19 miles (31 km) to Toccopola; Taylor Road leads southwest 9 miles (14 km) to Taylor; and Highway 314 ("Old Sardis Road") leads northwest, formerly to Sardis but now 11 miles (18 km) to the Clear Creek Recreation Area on Sardis Lake.

The streets in the downtown area follow a grid pattern with two naming conventions. Many of the north-south streets are numbered from west to east, beginning at the old railroad depot, with numbers from four to nineteen. The place of "Twelfth Street", however, is taken by North and South Lamar Boulevard (formerly North Street and South Street). The east-west avenues are named for the U.S. presidents in chronological order from north to south, from Washington to Cleveland; here again, there are gaps: there is no street for John Quincy Adams, who shares a last name with John Adams; "Polk Avenue" is replaced by University Avenue; and "Arthur Avenue" is lacking.

=== Climate ===
Oxford has a humid subtropical climate (Cfa) and is in hardiness zone 7b.

Climate data for Oxford, Mississippi (University of Mississippi) 1991–2020, extremes 1893–present
Month	Jan	Feb	Mar	Apr	May	Jun	Jul	Aug	Sep	Oct	Nov	Dec	Year
Record high °F (°C)	80 (27)	84 (29)	91 (33)	93 (34)	98 (37)	104 (40)	108 (42)	107 (42)	111 (44)	98 (37)	89 (32)	81 (27)	110 (43)
Mean maximum °F (°C)	72.1 (22.3)	75.2 (24.0)	82.2 (27.9)	87.0 (30.6)	90.8 (32.7)	94.9 (34.9)	97.1 (36.2)	97.7 (36.5)	94.8 (34.9)	89.4 (31.9)	80.1 (26.7)	72.9 (22.7)	98.8 (37.1)
Mean daily maximum °F (°C)	52.3 (11.3)	57.1 (13.9)	65.8 (18.8)	74.2 (23.4)	82.0 (27.8)	88.6 (31.4)	91.3 (32.9)	91.0 (32.8)	86.2 (30.1)	76.1 (24.5)	64.3 (17.9)	55.0 (12.8)	73.7 (23.2)
Daily mean °F (°C)	41.4 (5.2)	45.4 (7.4)	53.5 (11.9)	61.6 (16.4)	70.4 (21.3)	77.7 (25.4)	80.7 (27.1)	79.8 (26.6)	73.9 (23.3)	62.6 (17.0)	51.9 (11.1)	44.2 (6.8)	61.9 (16.6)
Mean daily minimum °F (°C)	30.6 (−0.8)	33.8 (1.0)	41.2 (5.1)	48.9 (9.4)	58.9 (14.9)	66.8 (19.3)	70.2 (21.2)	68.6 (20.3)	61.6 (16.4)	49.2 (9.6)	39.5 (4.2)	33.3 (0.7)	50.2 (10.1)
Mean minimum °F (°C)	12.1 (−11.1)	17.1 (−8.3)	22.5 (−5.3)	31.5 (−0.3)	42.2 (5.7)	55.3 (12.9)	61.1 (16.2)	59.3 (15.2)	45.7 (7.6)	32.2 (0.1)	22.1 (−5.5)	17.4 (−8.1)	9.7 (−12.4)
Record low °F (°C)	−13 (−25)	−10 (−23)	7 (−14)	21 (−6)	31 (−1)	43 (6)	50 (10)	48 (9)	32 (0)	20 (−7)	6 (−14)	−10 (−23)	−13 (−25)
Average precipitation inches (mm)	5.13 (130)	5.82 (148)	5.61 (142)	6.30 (160)	5.35 (136)	5.22 (133)	4.35 (110)	3.90 (99)	3.99 (101)	4.10 (104)	4.30 (109)	6.45 (164)	60.52 (1,537)
Average snowfall inches (cm)	0.8 (2.0)	0.2 (0.51)	0.1 (0.25)	0.0 (0.0)	0.0 (0.0)	0.0 (0.0)	0.0 (0.0)	0.0 (0.0)	0.0 (0.0)	0.0 (0.0)	0.0 (0.0)	0.1 (0.25)	1.2 (3.0)
Average precipitation days (≥ 0.01 in)	12.0	10.8	11.7	10.3	11.0	10.2	10.0	8.8	7.4	7.9	9.8	12.2	122.1
Average snowy days (≥ 0.1 in)	0.6	0.4	0.1	0.0	0.0	0.0	0.0	0.0	0.0	0.0	0.0	0.3	1.4
Source: NOAA

== Demographics ==
Historical population
Census	Pop.	Note	%±
1850	492		—
1870	1,422		—
1880	1,534		7.9%
1890	1,546		0.8%
1900	1,820		17.7%
1910	2,014		10.7%
1920	2,150		6.8%
1930	2,890		34.4%
1940	3,433		18.8%
1950	3,956		15.2%
1960	5,283		33.5%
1970	8,519		61.3%
1980	9,882		16.0%
1990	9,984		1.0%
2000	11,756		17.7%
2010	18,916		60.9%
2020	25,416		34.4%
2024 (est.)	26,801		5.4%
U.S. Decennial Census; 2024 estimate

=== 2020 census ===
As of the 2020 census, Oxford had a population of 25,416 and 5,089 families. The median age was 27.8 years. 17.0% of residents were under the age of 18 and 13.0% of residents were 65 years of age or older. For every 100 females there were 93.4 males, and for every 100 females age 18 and over there were 92.0 males age 18 and over.

94.7% of residents lived in urban areas, while 5.3% lived in rural areas.

There were 11,856 households in Oxford, of which 19.8% had children under the age of 18 living in them. Of all households, 26.5% were married-couple households, 30.8% were households with a male householder and no spouse or partner present, and 37.8% were households with a female householder and no spouse or partner present. About 43.8% of all households were made up of individuals and 9.3% had someone living alone who was 65 years of age or older.

There were 15,944 housing units, of which 25.6% were vacant. The homeowner vacancy rate was 2.9% and the rental vacancy rate was 19.7%.

Racial composition as of the 2020 census
Race	Number	Percent
White	16,822	66.2%
Black or African American	5,704	22.4%
American Indian and Alaska Native	23	0.1%
Asian	1,279	5.0%
Native Hawaiian and Other Pacific Islander	7	0.0%
Some other race	421	1.7%
Two or more races	1,160	4.6%
Hispanic or Latino (of any race)	1,042	4.1%

=== 2010 census ===
As of the census of 2010, there were 18,916 people, with 8,648 households residing in the city. The racial makeup of the city was 72.3% White, 21.8% African American, 0.3% Native American, 3.3% Asian, 0.1% Pacific Islander, and 1.1% from two or more races. Hispanic or Latino people of any race were 2.5% of the population. The average household size was 2.09.

The median income for a household in the city was $38,872, and the average household income was $64,643. The per capita income for the city was $29,195. About 12% of families and 32.3% of the population were below the poverty line.

== Arts and culture ==
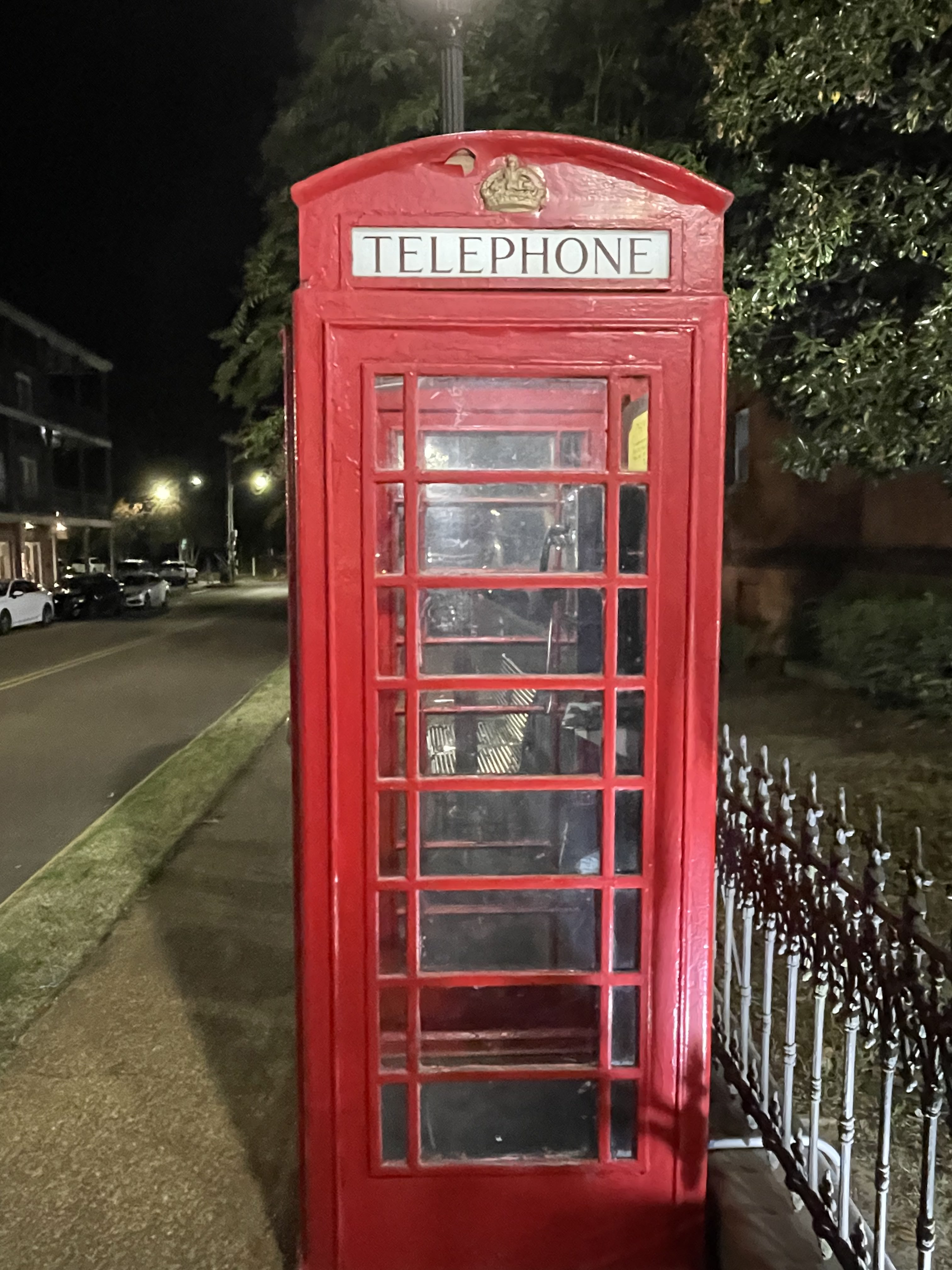
Oxford phone booth by City Hall

=== Attractions ===
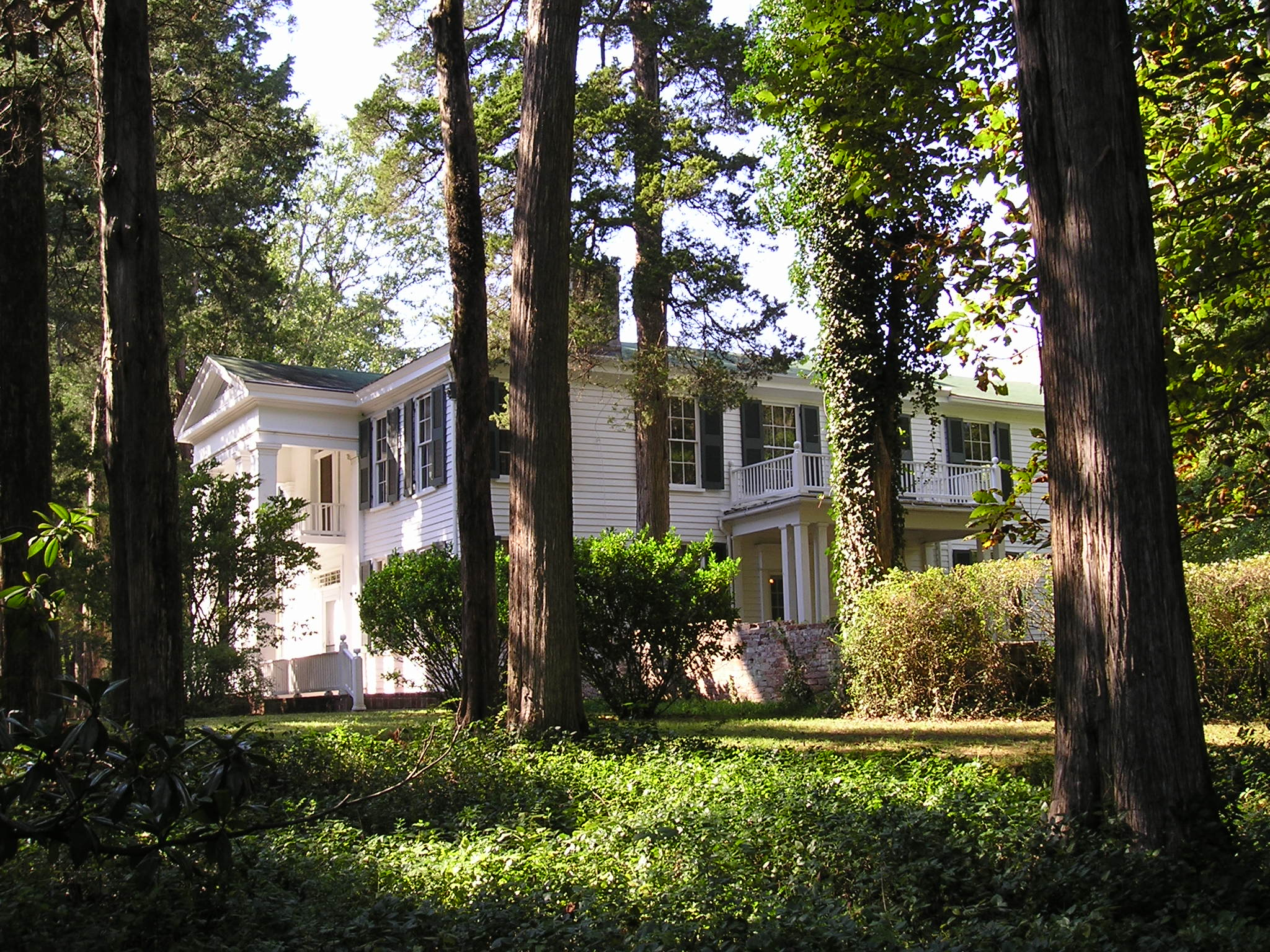
Rowan Oak, the home of William Faulkner

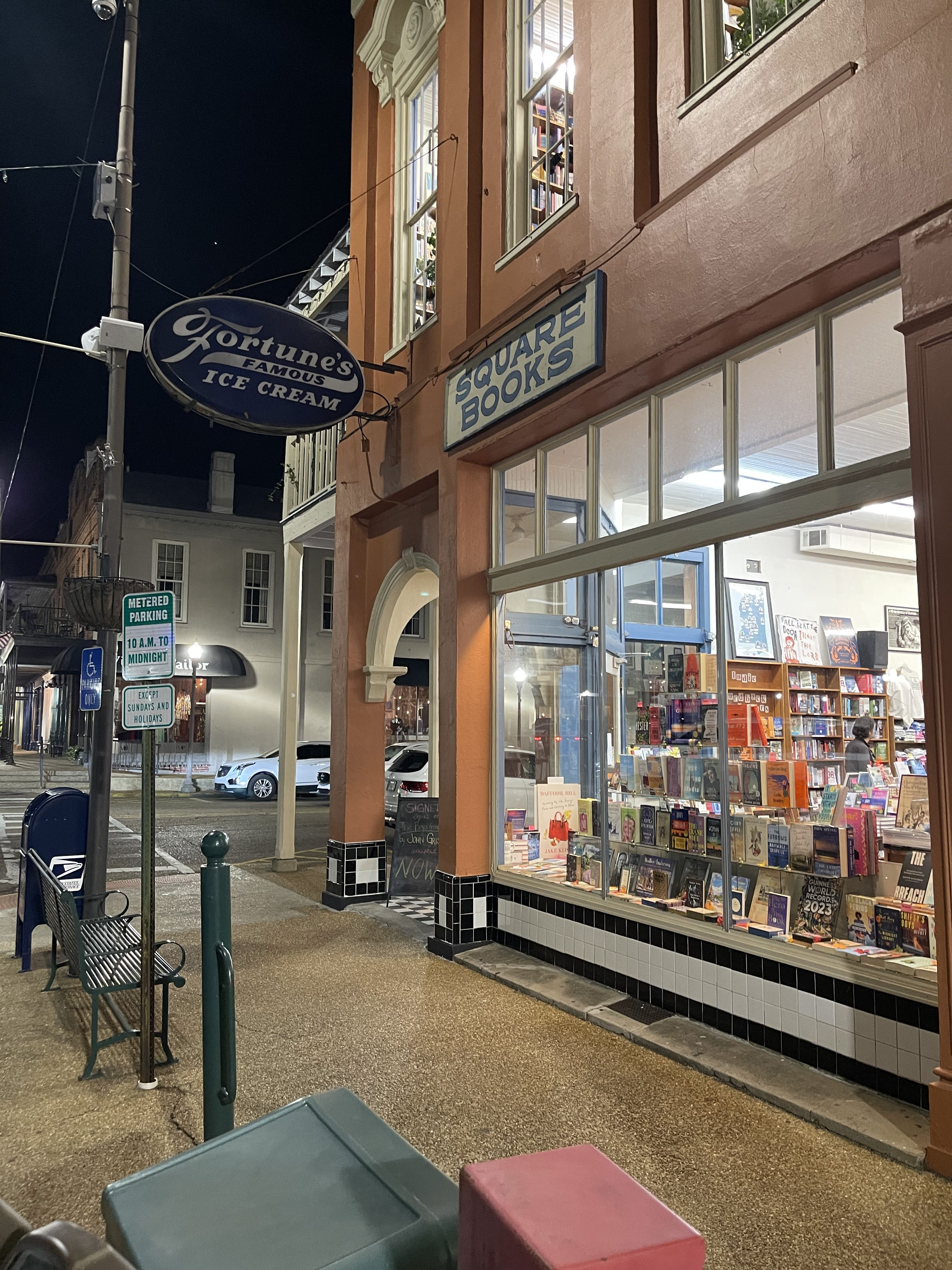
Square Books

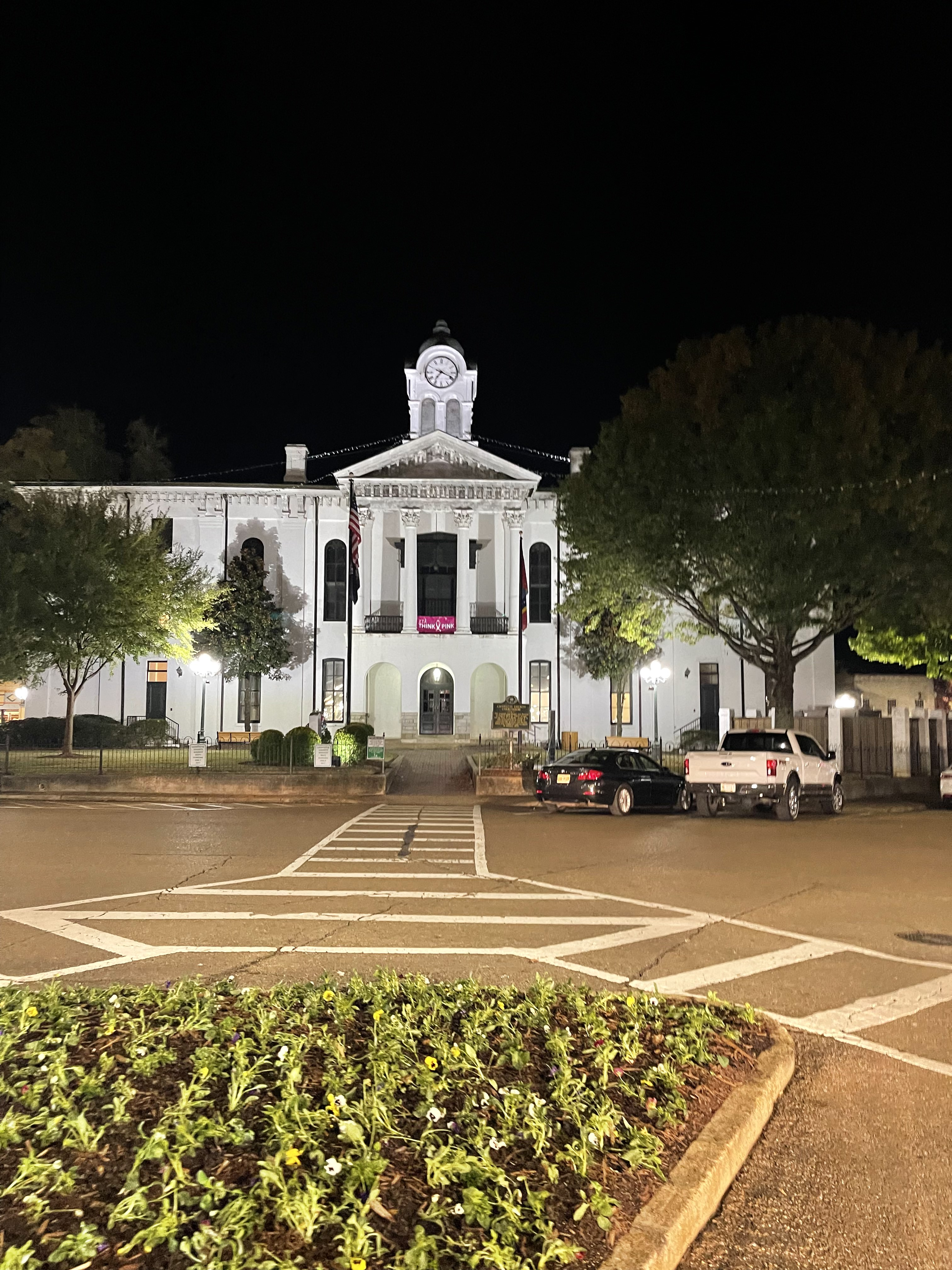
Lafayette County Court House

In addition to the historic Lafayette County Courthouse, the Square is known for an abundance of locally owned restaurants, specialty boutiques, and professional offices, along with Oxford City Hall.

- The J. E. Neilson Co., located on the southeast corner of the Square, is the South's oldest documented store. Founded as a trading post in 1839, Neilson's continues to anchor the Oxford square. Neilsons was one of the few stores to survive the burning of Oxford during the Civil war. It stands within eyesight of one of Oxford's two confederate statues (one was erected after the original faced south because the South "never retreats;" a Falkner (William added a "U") paid for the second). Neilson's also features a letter from William Faulkner, who repeatedly refused to pay debts owed to the department store. When the Great Depression hit Oxford and most of the banks in town closed, Neilson's acted as a surrogate bank, cashing paychecks for university employees and others. Neilson's is also the only store in Oxford to carry supplies for Boy Scout uniforms.
- Square Books, founded in 1979, is an independent bookstore. A sister store, Off Square Books, is several doors down the street to the east. It deals in used and remainder books and is the venue for a radio show called Thacker Mountain Radio, with host Jim Dees, that is broadcast statewide on Mississippi Public Broadcasting. The show often draws comparisons to Garrison Keillor's A Prairie Home Companion for its mix of author readings and musical guests. A third store, Square Books Jr., deals exclusively in children's books and educational toys.
- The Lyric Theater, just off the courthouse square, is Oxford's largest music venue, with a capacity near 1200. Originally built in the late 1800s, the structure became a livery stable owned by William Faulkner's family in the early part of the 20th century. During the 1920s it became Oxford's first motion picture theater, the Lyric. In 1949, Faulkner walked from his home in Oxford to his childhood stable for the world premiere of MGM's Intruder in the Dust, adapted from one of his novels. The building housed office space and a health center from the early 1980s. After extensive restoration, the Lyric reopened on July 3, 2008, as a live music venue. It also is used occasionally for film and live drama.
- The Gertrude Castellow Ford Center for the Performing Arts on the University of Mississippi's campus hosts a broad range of events, such as symphony performances, operas, musicals, plays, comedy tours, chamber music, and guest lectures. The Ford Center, as it is commonly known, also hosted the 2008 presidential debate between former President Barack Obama and Senator John McCain.
- The University of Mississippi Museum is located on the University of Mississippi's main campus. The Robinson collection of Greek and Roman antiquities and the Millington-Barnard collection of 19th century scientific instruments are permanent collections of the museum. The museum is also home to the personal collections of Kate Skipwith and Mary Buie. The permanent exhibits are free to the public.
- The Burns-Belfry Museum was previously the Burns Methodist Episcopal Church organized by freed African Americans in 1910. Now, the museum pays tribute to its role in the Civil War era. The museum houses a permanent exhibit on African American history that spans from slavery through the Civil Rights Movement.

=== Culture ===
- Oxford has had a diverse music scene for many years. Oxford's relatively close proximity to large music cities such as Memphis, New Orleans, and Nashville, influence its musical stylings. Musicians past and present living in Oxford include Beanland, The Cooters, Bass Drum of Death, Parliamentary Procedure, Kudzu Kings, Blue Mountain, George McConnell, Caroline Herring, and blues harp player Adam Gussow.
- Oxford is also the home of the music label Fat Possum Records, who released records by blues musicians R. L. Burnside and Junior Kimbrough, as well as The Black Keys. Johnny Marr, former guitarist for The Smiths and current member of Modest Mouse bought a home in Oxford but no longer lives in it. Former Derek and the Dominos member Bobby Whitlock lived in Oxford where he had a ranch and his own studio.
- Musicians Modest Mouse, Gavin Degraw, Elvis Costello, The Hives, and Counting Crows have recorded albums at Sweet Tea Recording Studio in Oxford. Dennis Herring, the owner of Sweet Tea, has received Grammy Awards for his work with artists such as Jars of Clay and blues guitarist Buddy Guy.
- Bob Dylan wrote a song called "Oxford Town", which was included on his 1963 album The Freewheelin' Bob Dylan. The song was about the violent events surrounding the admission of James Meredith into the University of Mississippi in 1962. Dylan played a concert at the Tad Smith Coliseum on the Ole Miss campus in November 1990, which opened with a performance of the song "Oxford Town".
- Oxford has been the setting for numerous movies, including Intruder in the Dust (1949, based on the Faulkner novel), Home from the Hill (1960), Barn Burning (1980, based on the Faulkner short story), Rush (1981 documentary), Heart of Dixie (1989), The Gun in Betty Lou's Handbag (1992), Glorious Mail (2005), Sorry, We're Open (2008 documentary), The Night of the Loup Garou (2009), Where I Begin (2010), and parts of The People vs. Larry Flynt (1997).
- American journalist and novelist Joan Didion mentions Oxford in her 1979 collection of essays The White Album.

=== Historic sites ===
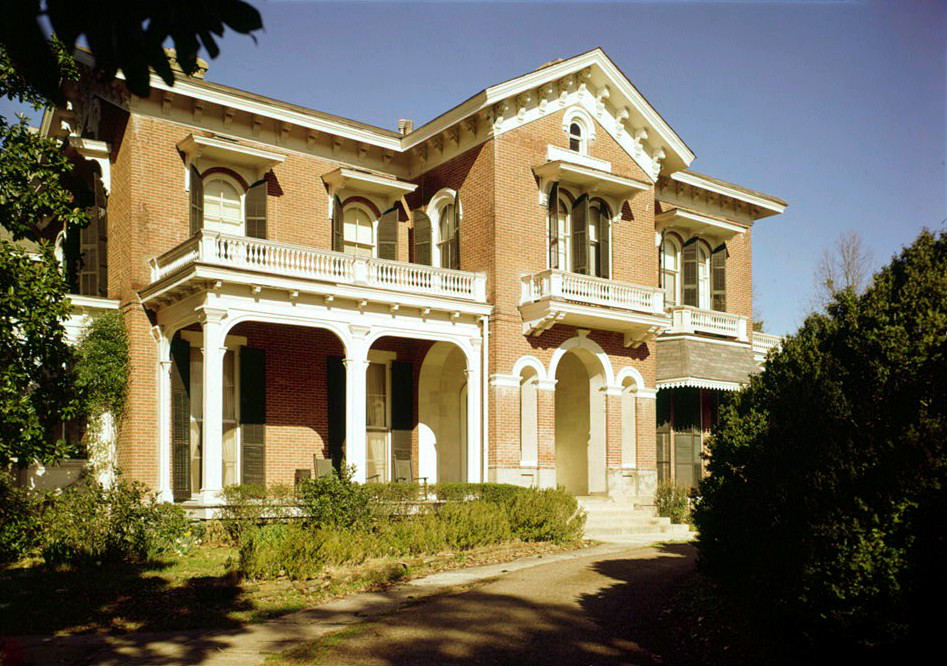
Ammadelle (1859) was designed by Central Park co-designer Calvert Vaux.

See also National Register of Historic Places listings in Lafayette County, Mississippi and the Lyceum-The Circle Historic District, University of Mississippi.

- Ammadelle (Pegues House), designed by Calvert Vaux
- Barnard Observatory (Center for the Study of Southern Culture), University of Mississippi, 1859
- Isom Place, c. 1843, remodeled 1848
- Lafayette County Courthouse, 1872, designed by Willis, Sloan, and Trigg
- Lucius Q. C. Lamar House, ca. 1860
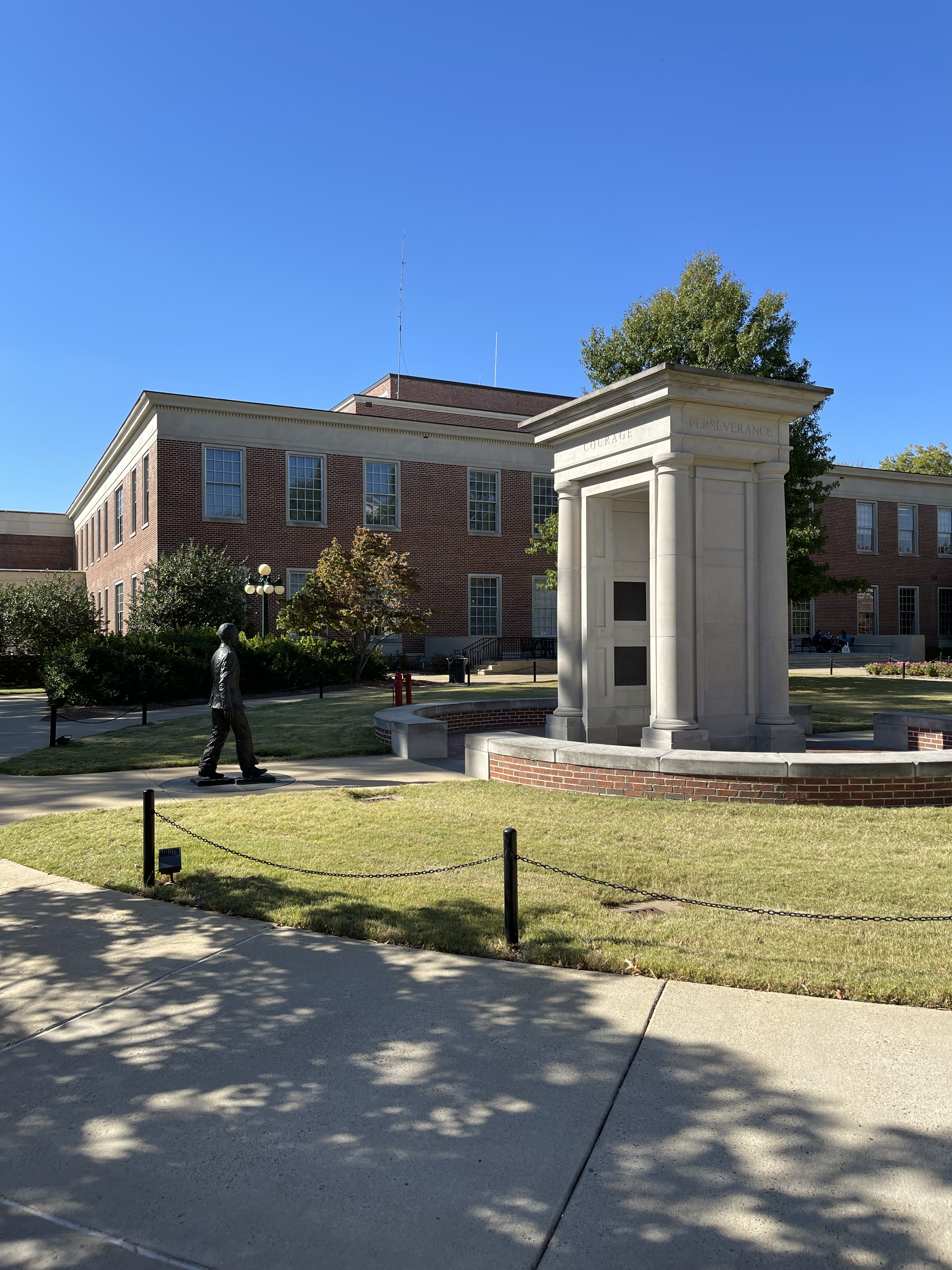
  James Meredith Statue
- The Lyceum, University of Mississippi, 1848, designed by William Nichols
- Rowan Oak (William Faulkner House), 1848
- St. Peter's Episcopal Church, 1860, attributed to Richard Upjohn (Neo-Gothic)
- University of Mississippi Power House, site of William Faulkner's 1930 novel As I Lay Dying
- Ventress Hall, University of Mississippi, 1889 (Richardson Romanesque)

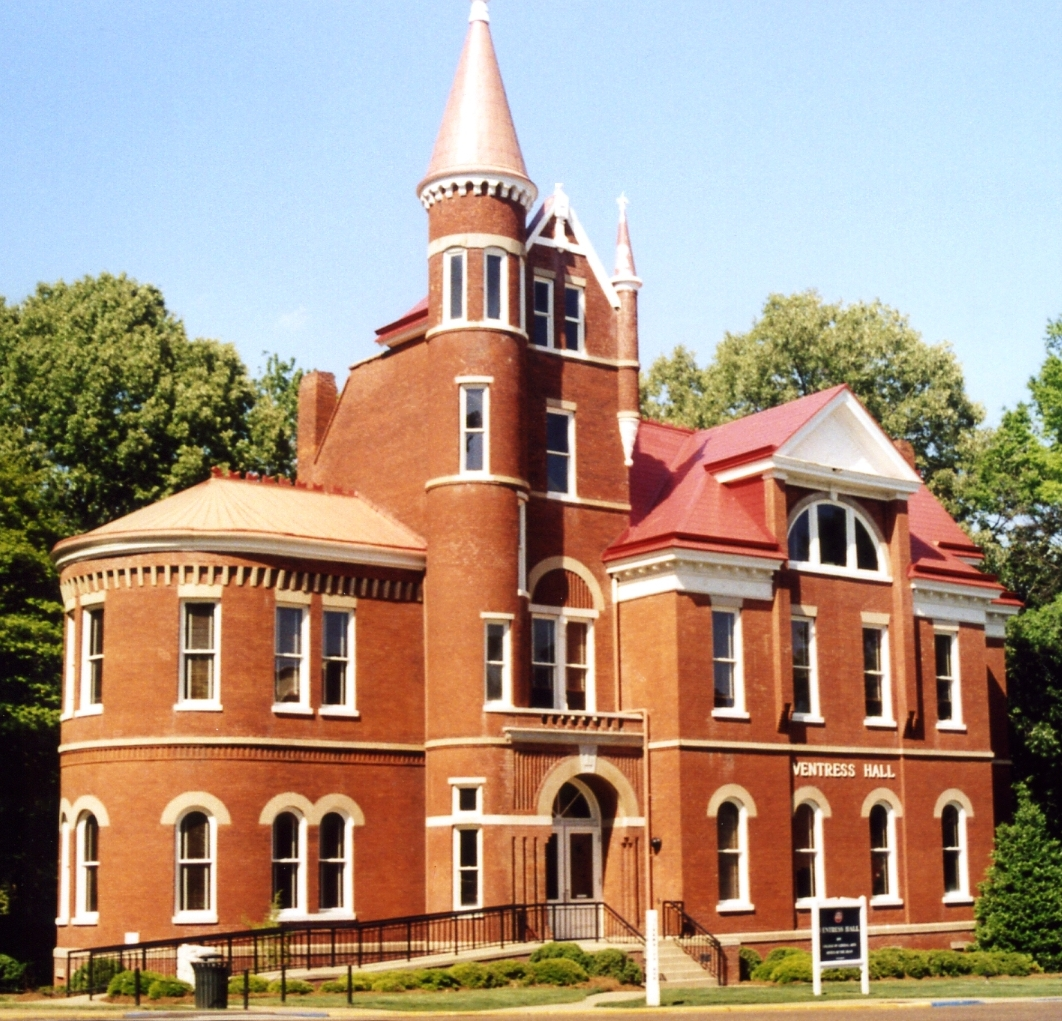

== Education ==
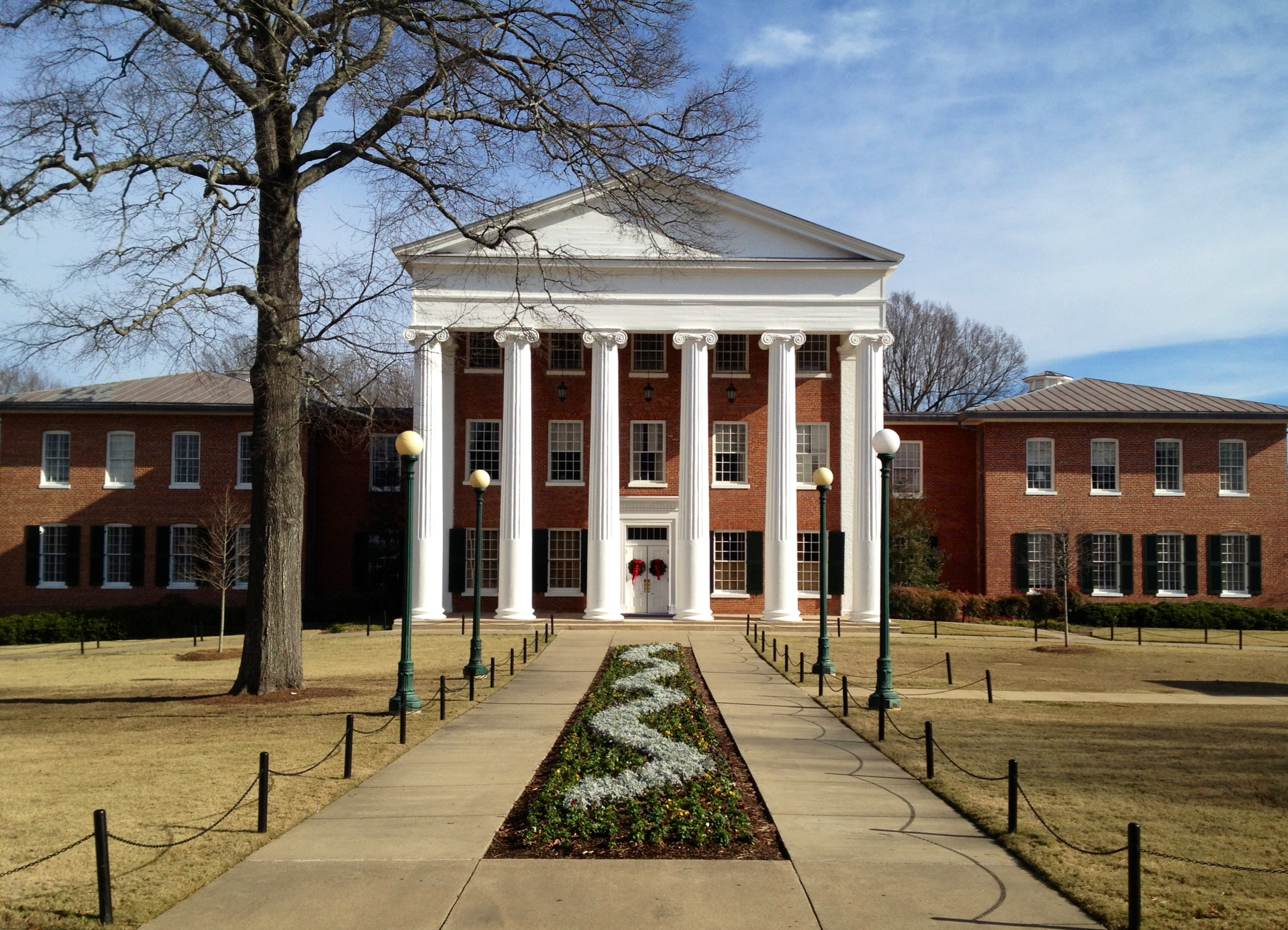
The Lyceum at the University of Mississippi

The city is served by two public school districts, Oxford School District (with the majority of the area) and Lafayette County School District (with small outerlying sections). The former operates Oxford High School.

It is also served by three private schools: Oxford University School, Regents School of Oxford and Magnolia Montessori. Oxford is partially the home of the main campus of the University of Mississippi, known as "Ole Miss" (much of the campus is in University, Mississippi, an unincorporated enclave surrounded by the city), and of the Lafayette-Yalobusha Center of Northwest Mississippi Community College. The North Mississippi Japanese Supplementary School, a Japanese weekend school, is operated in conjunction with the University of Mississippi, with classes held on campus.

== Media ==
- The Oxford Eagle, founded 1865
- The Daily Mississippian, the student newspaper of the University of Mississippi, founded 1911
- The Local Voice, a bimonthly entertainment guide and newspaper
- WUMS, the student radio station of the University of Mississippi

== Infrastructure ==
=== Health care ===
The Baptist Memorial Hospital - North Mississippi, located in Oxford provides comprehensive health care services for Oxford and the surrounding area, supported by a growing number of physicians, clinics and support facilities. The North Mississippi Regional Center, a state-licensed Intermediate Care Facility for Individuals with Intellectual Disabilities (ICF/IID), is located in Oxford.

Oxford is home to the National Center for Natural Products Research at the University of Mississippi's School of Pharmacy. The Center is the only facility in the United States that is federally licensed to cultivate marijuana for scientific research, and to distribute it to medical marijuana patients.

=== Transportation ===
The city operates public transportation under the name Oxford-University Transit (OUT), with bus routes throughout the city and University of Mississippi campus. Ole Miss students and faculty ride free upon showing University identification.

University-Oxford Airport is a public use airport located two nautical miles (4 km) northwest of the central business district of Oxford. The airport is owned by the University of Mississippi.

== Notable people ==
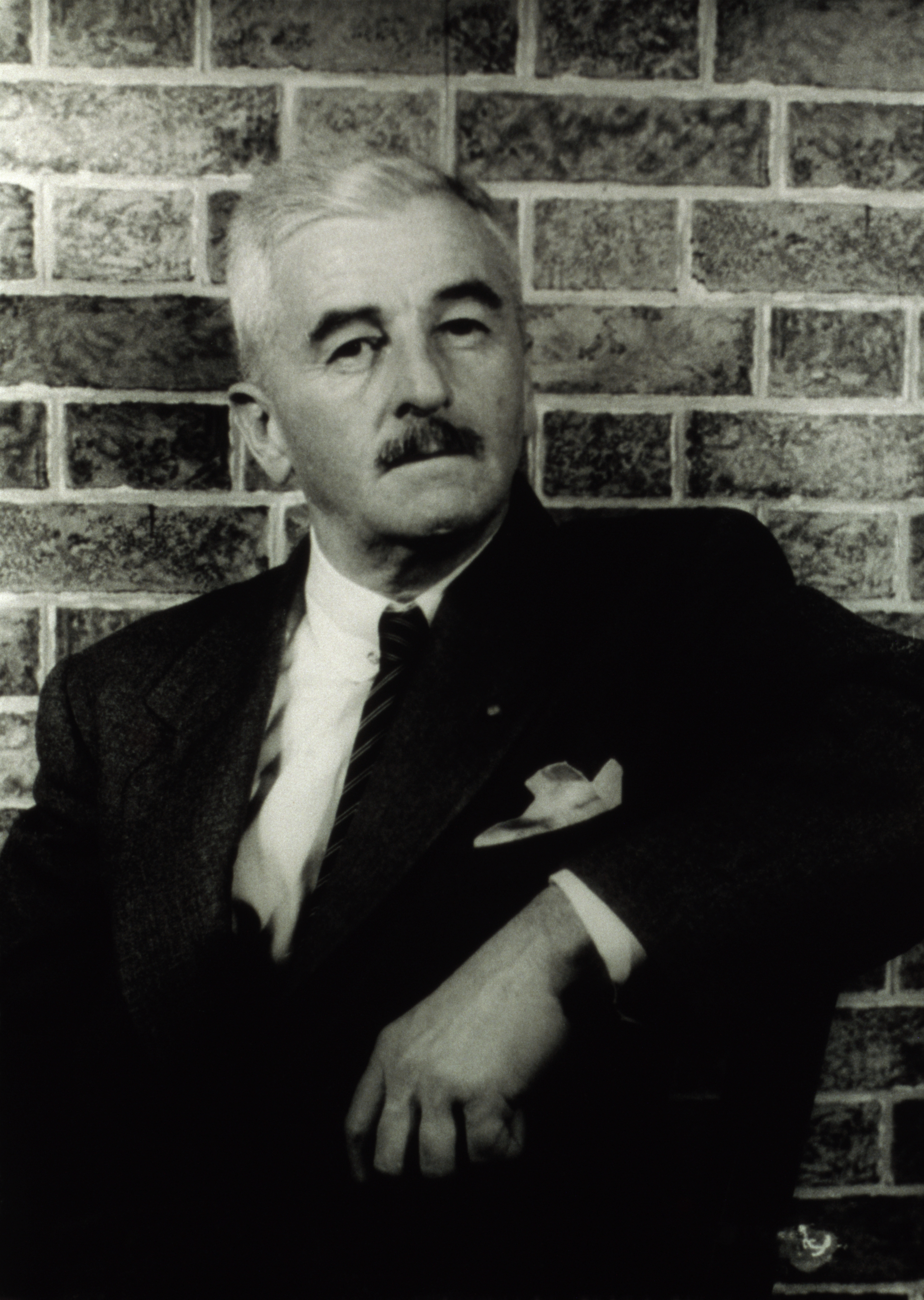
Oxford native William Faulkner in 1954

- William Faulkner grew up in Oxford and used it as the fictional city of "Jefferson".
- Arthur Guyton (1919–2003), physiologist, was born in Oxford.
- Authors include John Grisham, Julie Cantrell, Kiese Laymon, Curtis Wilkie, Ace Atkins, Aimee Nezhukumatathil, Chris Offutt, Howard Bahr, Richard Ford, Tom Franklin, Beth Ann Fennelly, Ann Fisher-Wirth, Wright Thompson, Stark Young, Larry Brown, Willie Morris, and Barry Hannah.
- Artists include photorealist painter Glennray Tutor, figurative painter Jere Allen, and primitive artist Theora Hamblett (1895–1977).
- Secretary of the Interior Jacob Thompson (1810–1885) owned a manor called "Home Place" in Oxford that was burned during the Civil War by Union troops. A historical marker stands where it once stood.
- L.Q.C. Lamar (1825–1893), U.S. senator and supreme court justice, resided in Oxford, where he served as professor of mathematics at the University of Mississippi, farmed, and practiced law. He was the son-in-law of university chancellor Augustus Baldwin Longstreet. Lamar's home in Oxford was restored as a museum in 2008.
- Angela McGlowan (born 1970), Republican political commentator, author, and consulting firm CEO
- Naomi Sims (1948–2009), fashion model, was born in Oxford.
- New York Giants quarterback Eli Manning, who played college football at Ole Miss, lives in Oxford during the off-season. His father, former Ole Miss and New Orleans Saints quarterback Archie Manning, owns a condominium in Oxford.

== Sister city ==
- Aubigny-sur-Nère, Cher, France
