= Square Books =

Mississippian general independent bookstore

Coordinates: 34.3660°N 89.5189°W

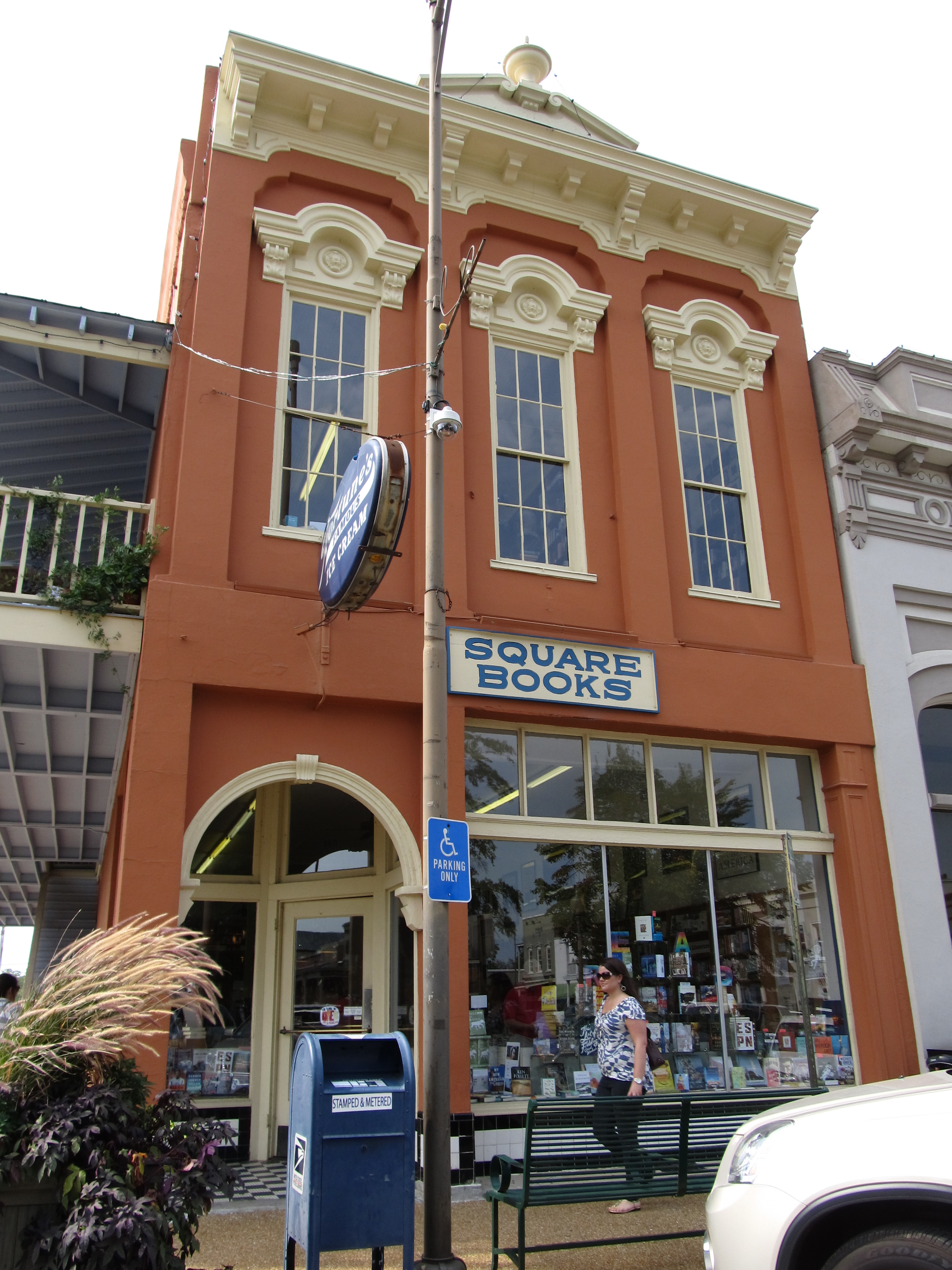
- Exterior view of Square Books, 2011
- Company type: Private
- Industry: Retail
- Founded: September 14, 1979
- Founder: Richard Howorth
- Headquarters: Oxford, Mississippi
- Products: Books
- Website: squarebooks.com

Square Books is a general independent bookstore in three separate historic buildings (about 100 feet apart) on the town square of Oxford, Mississippi, widely known among readers as the hub of William Faulkner's "postage stamp of native soil," Yoknapatawpha. The main store, Square Books, is in a two-story building with a cafe and balcony on the second floor; Off Square Books is a few doors down from the main store and has lifestyle sections such as gardening and cookbooks; and Square Books Jr, the children's bookstore, is in a building adjacent to the historic Neilson's Department Store, which has continuously operated since 1839. Square Books is known for its strong selection of literary fiction, books on the American South and by Southern writers, a large inventory of bargain books, and its emphasis on books for children. The store hosts the popular Thacker Mountain radio show and over 150 author events a year, and is a founding co-sponsor of the Oxford Conference for the Book.

== History ==
Square Books opened in 1979, initially focused on literature about Mississippi and the South. With the help of former Director of the Center for the Study of Southern Culture Bill Ferris, the bookstore, still in its infancy, hosted authors including Toni Morrison, Allen Ginsberg, and Alice Walker for readings and book-signings. Willie Morris became writer in residence at the University of Mississippi in 1980, and also was a great friend to the bookstore, who brought to town William Styron, James Dickey and Peter Matthiessen. In 1982 Barry Hannah moved to town. Hannah had an enormous effect on his students and many writers, such as Amy Hempel, came to town to visit Hannah, and thus Square Books. Mississippi native Richard Ford has had a long-time affiliation with the store, reading on the occasion of its 1986 expansion, and John Grisham and Larry Brown had their initial bookstore signing appearances at Square Books.

The store is known for its close connection to the Oxford - Ole Miss community. The store's founder, Richard Howorth, often has remarked that much of the store's support from the community has been based on its ambition to overcome the stigma placed upon Ole Miss and Oxford after riots broke out on the campus when James Meredith desegregated the University in 1962. This aspect of the town's relationship to the store is further evinced by Howorth's being elected to serve two terms as mayor of Oxford, 2001 - 2009.

The store moved to the former Blaylock Drug Store building in 1986, its current location. In late 1993 Square Books opened an annex location, Off Square Books, a few doors down the street from the main store, and there has grown a vast inventory of remainders along with a selection of used and collectible books. Off Square Books is also the space where an active schedule of touring authors, children's events, and the weekly live radio show, Thacker Mountain Radio, take place. In 2003 Square Books Jr, the children's bookstore branch, opened on the east side of the square. In 2019, when Square Books celebrated their 40th anniversary, Rare Square Books, offering signed and collectible books, opened in the original location on the 2nd floor above Square Books Jr.

Gallery of Interior views

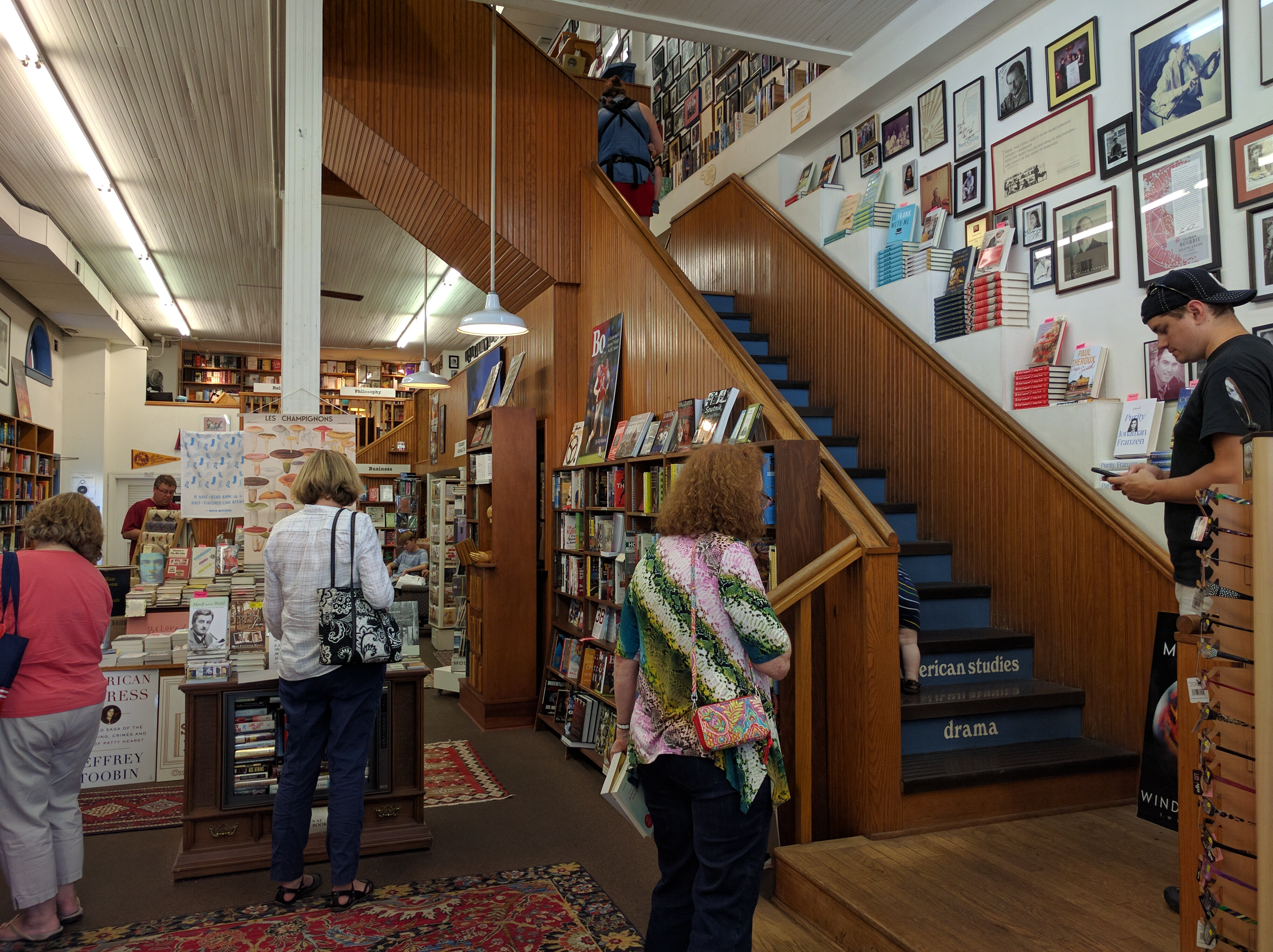

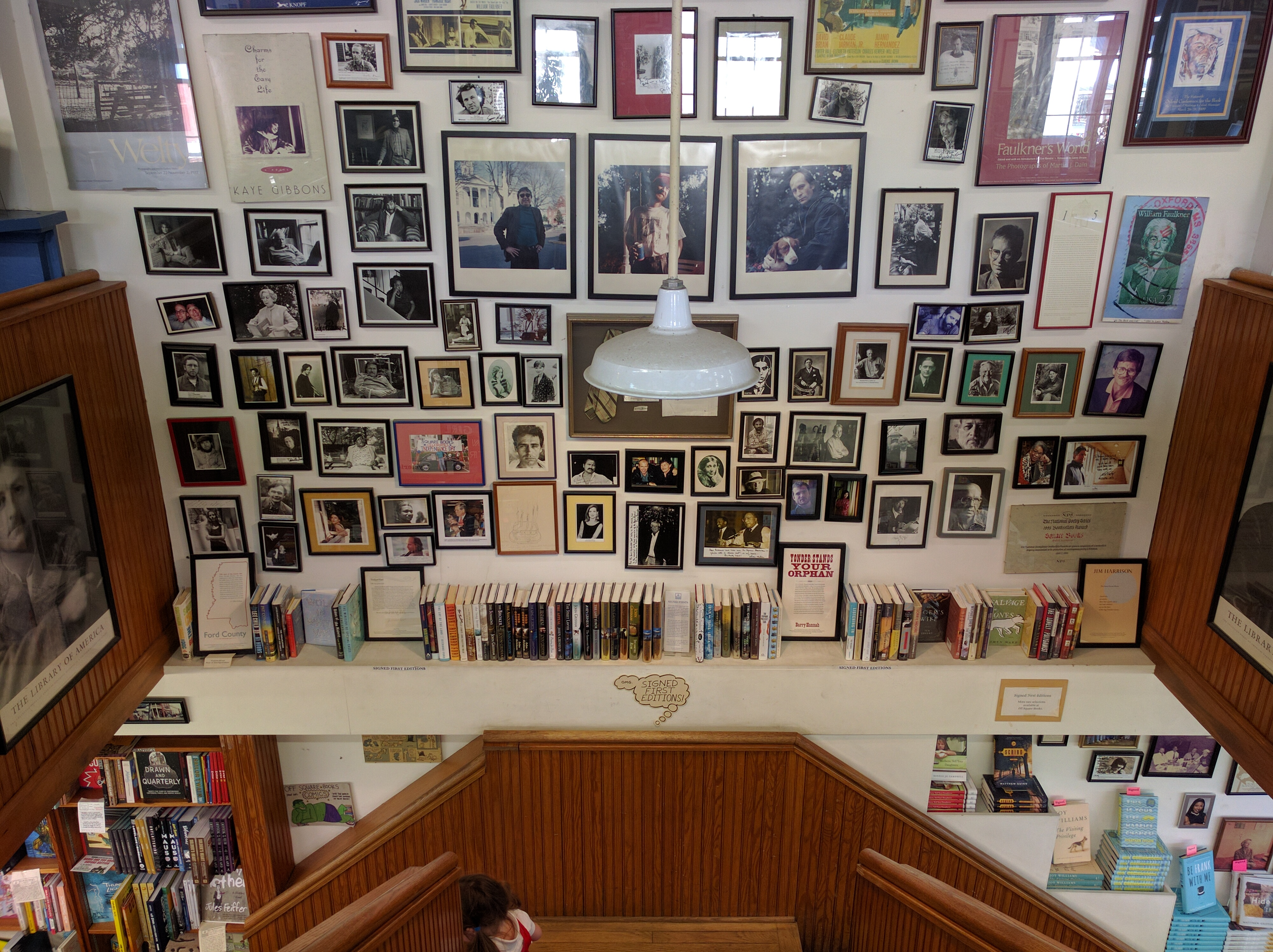
Autographed author photos

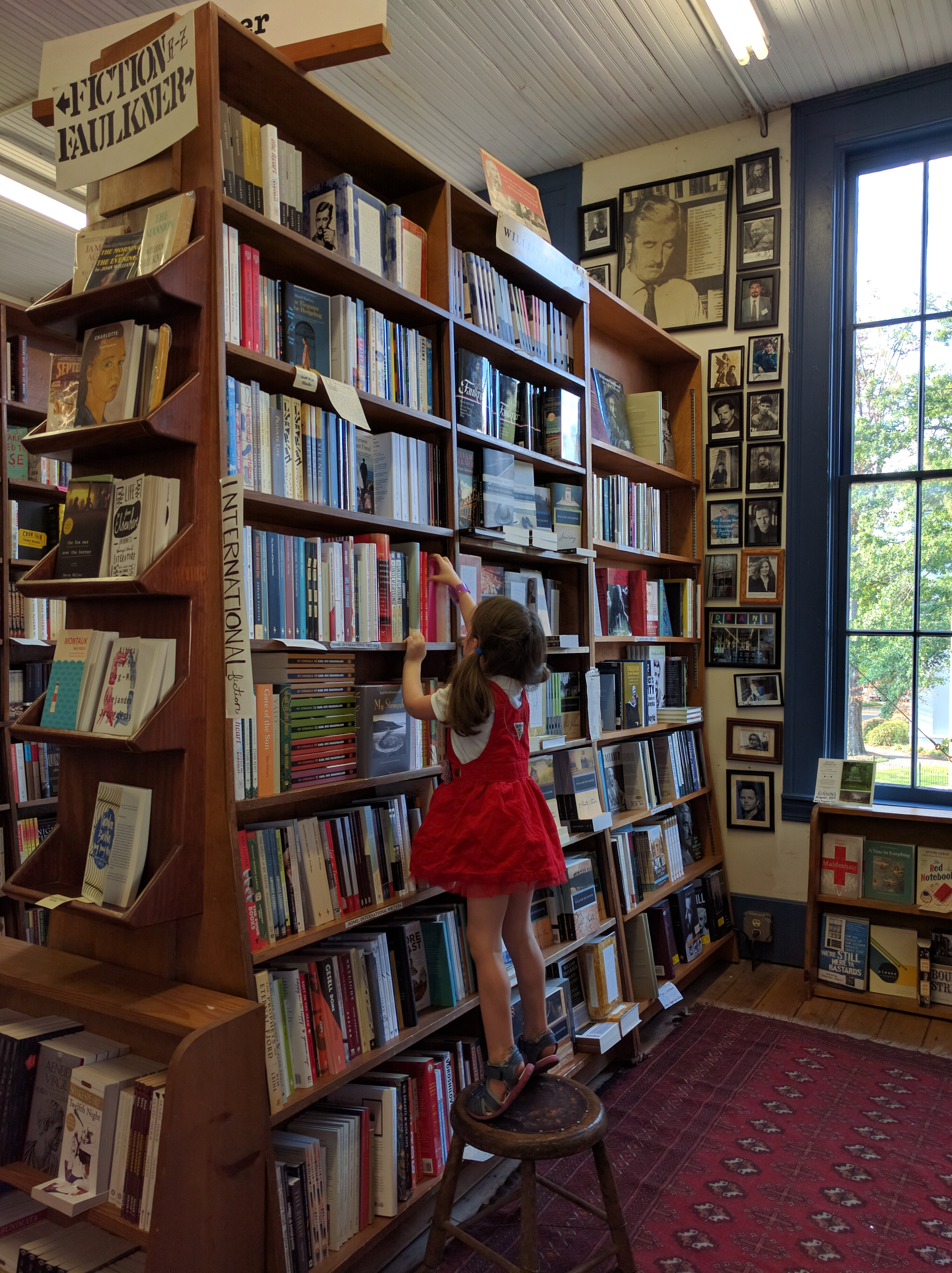
Faulkner section

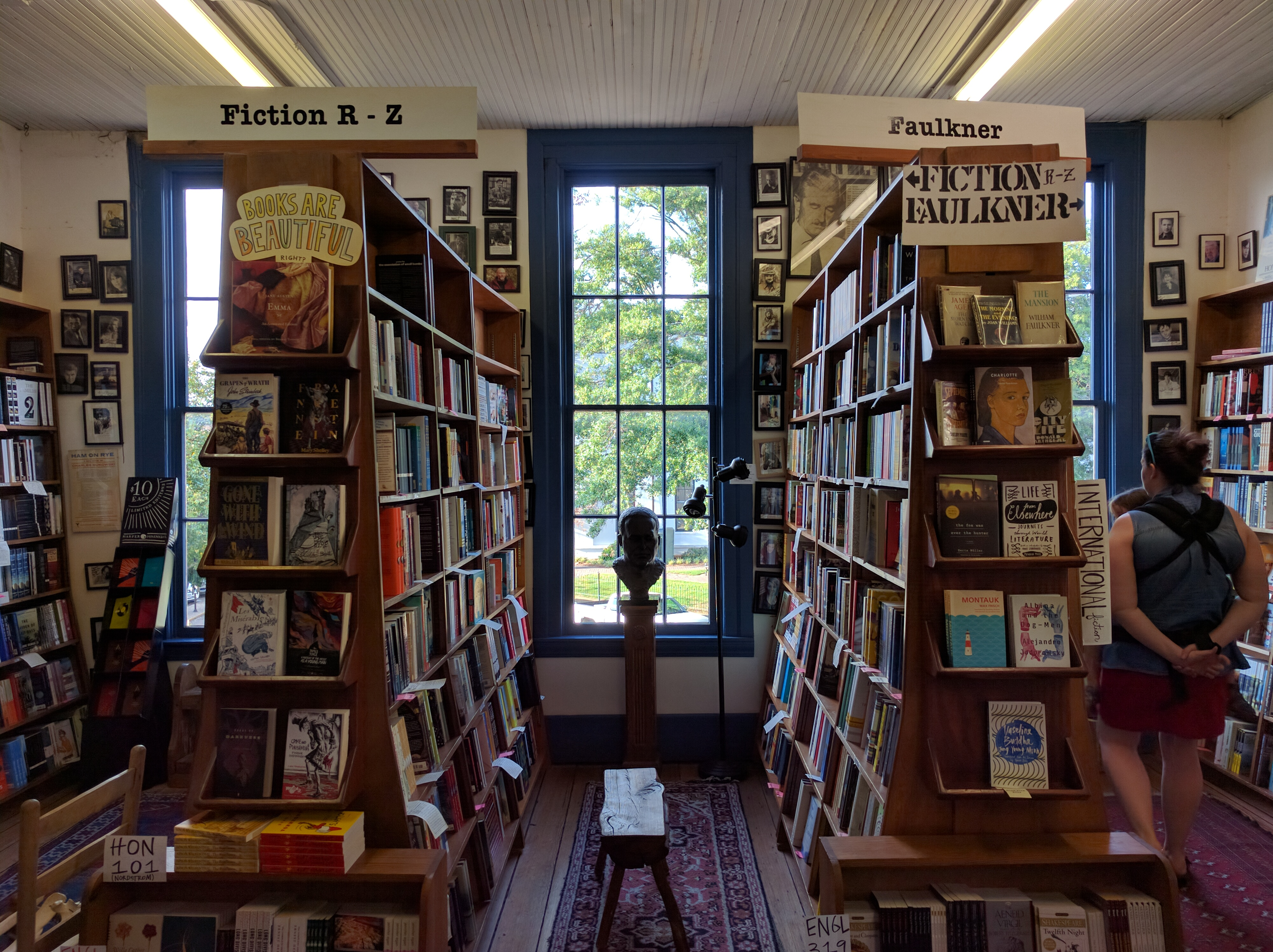

== Awards and honors ==
- In 1986, owner Richard Howorth received the Charles S Haslam Award for Excellence in Bookselling
- In 2008, Howorth was awarded the Author's Guild Award for Distinguished Service to the Literary Community
- In 2013, Publishers Weekly awarded the store 'Bookseller of the Year'.
