= Long, Last, Happy =

Short story collection

- First edition
- Author: Barry Hannah
- Cover artist: Charles Rue Woods
- Language: English
- Publisher: Grove Press
- Publication date: 2010
- Publication place: United States
- Pages: 459

Long, Last, Happy: New and Selected Stories is a 2010 collection of short stories by the American author Barry Hannah. It includes a selection of stories from his four earlier collections, Airships (1978), Captain Maximus (1985), Bats Out of Hell (1993), and High Lonesome (1996), along with one early work never published before in volume form and four new stories. It was published in December 2010 by Grove Press, after Hannah's death in March earlier that year.

== Contents ==
The collection contains 31 stories in total. No editor is credited, and no introduction is provided. "Trek", which had never been published in volume form, first appeared in The Arrowhead, a student publication at Mississippi College, in 1964. Many of the other stories appeared in periodicals before being published in Hannah's earlier collections.

The four new stories, according to the publisher, are from "the final manuscripts Hannah left behind". A starred review in Publishers Weekly states that the new stories "can be read as a set of interlocking narratives, each presenting a different angle on a series of arson attacks on small churches."

=== 1964-1978: Airships and Before ===
- Trek
- Water Liars
- Love Too Long
- Testimony of Pilot
- Coming Close to Donna
- Dragged Fighting from His Tomb
- Midnight and I'm Not Famous Yet
- Knowing He Was Not My Kind Yet I Followed
- Behold the Husband in His Perfect Agony
- Mother Rooney Unscrolls the Hurt

=== 1979-1985: Captain Maximus ===
- Getting Ready
- Even Greenland
- Ride, Fly, Penetrate, Loiter
- Fans

=== 1986-1993: Bats Out of Hell ===
- High-Water Railers
- Two Things, Dimly, Were Going at Each Other
- Bats Out of Hell Division
- Evening of the Yarp: A Report by Roonswent Dover
- Mother Mouth
- Rat-Faced Auntie
- Scandale d'estime
- Hey, Have You Got a Cig, the Time, the News, My Face?

=== 1993-1996: High Lonesome ===
- Get Some Young
- A Creature in the Bay of St. Louis
- Two Gone Over
- Drummer Down
- Uncle High Lonesome

=== 2000s: Long, Last, Happy: New Stories ===
- Fire Water
- Sick Soldier at Your Door
- Lastward, Deputy James
- Rangoon Green
- Publisher's Note

== Critical reception ==
The collection received positive reviews in Publishers Weekly, The New York Times Book Review, The New York Times, The Wall Street Journal, The Los Angeles Times, Slate, and NPR.
