= As I Lay Dying =

Novel by William Faulkner

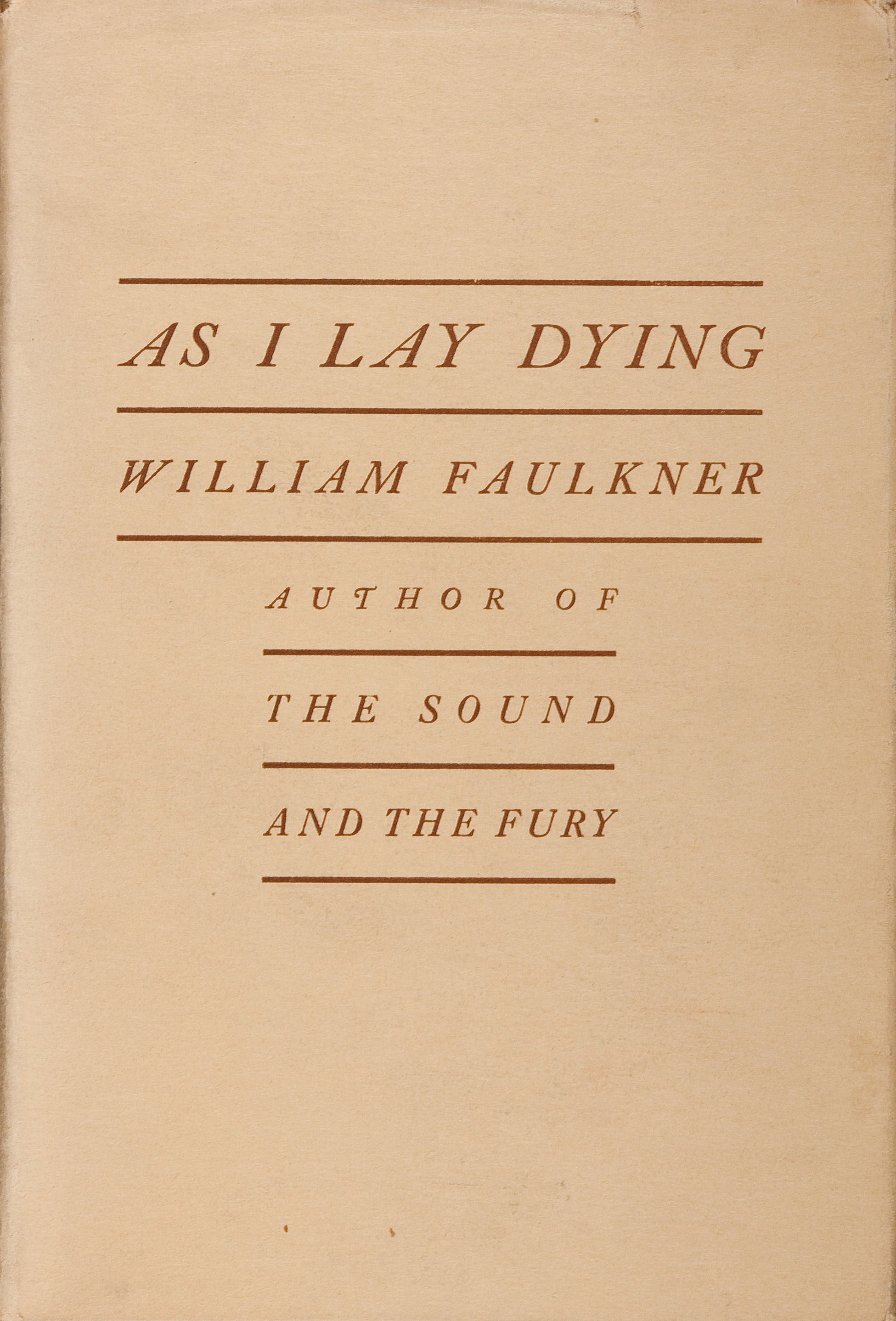
- First edition cover
- Author: William Faulkner
- Genre: Modernist, Southern Gothic, black comedy
- Publisher: Jonathan Cape & Harrison Smith
- Publication date: October 6, 1930
- Preceded by: The Sound and the Fury
- Followed by: Sanctuary
- Text: As I Lay Dying at Wikisource

As I Lay Dying is a 1930 Southern Gothic novel by American author William Faulkner. Faulkner's fifth novel, it is consistently ranked among the best novels of the 20th century. The title is derived from William Marris's 1925 translation of Homer's Odyssey, referring to the similar themes of both works.

The novel uses a stream-of-consciousness writing technique, multiple narrators, and varying chapter lengths.

As a work published in 1930, the novel entered the public domain on January 1, 2026.

== Plot summary ==
The book is narrated by 15 different characters over 59 chapters. It is the story of the death of Addie Bundren and her poor, rural family's quest to honor her wish to be buried in her hometown of Jefferson, Mississippi, as well as the motives—noble or selfish—they show on the journey.

In the novel's opening chapters, Addie is alive but in ill health. She expects to die soon and sits at a window watching as her firstborn child, Cash, builds her coffin. Anse, Addie's husband, waits on the porch, while their daughter, Dewey Dell, fans her mother in the July heat. The night after Addie dies, a heavy rainstorm sets in; rivers rise and wash out bridges that the family will need to cross to get to Jefferson. It is after Addie’s death that the youngest, Vardaman, famously declares that his mother is a fish in an attempt to rationalize the loss.

The family's trek by wagon begins, with Addie's non-embalmed body in the coffin. Along the way, Anse and the five children encounter various difficulties. Stubborn Anse frequently rejects any offers of assistance, including meals or lodging, so at times the family goes hungry and sleeps in barns. At other times he refuses to accept loans from people, claiming he wishes to "be beholden to no man", thus manipulating the would-be lender into giving him charity as a gift not to be repaid.

Jewel, Addie's middle child, tries to leave the family after Anse sells Jewel's most prized possession, his horse. Yet Jewel cannot turn his back on his father and siblings through the tribulations of the journey to Jefferson. Cash breaks a leg and winds up riding atop the coffin. He stoically refuses to admit to any discomfort but the family eventually puts a makeshift cast of concrete on his leg. Twice, the family almost loses Addie's coffin—first, while crossing a river on a washed-out bridge (two mules are lost) and then when a fire of suspicious origin starts in the barn where the coffin is being stored for the night.

After nine days, the family arrives in Jefferson, where the stench from the coffin is quickly smelled by the townspeople. In town, family members have different items of business to take care of. Cash's broken leg needs attention. Dewey Dell, for the second time in the novel, goes to a pharmacy to obtain an abortion that she does not know how to ask for with money given to her by Lafe, the man who impregnated her. Pharmacy clerk Skeet MacGowan coerces Dewey Dell into sex in the cellar in exchange for "abortion pills" which are just talcum powder. First, though, Anse wants to borrow some shovels to bury Addie, because that was the purpose of the trip and the family should be together for that. After that happens, Darl, the second eldest and thoughtful, poetic observer of the family, is seized for the arson of the barn and sent to the Mississippi State Insane Asylum in Jackson. With Addie only just buried, Anse forces Dewey Dell to give up the money she intended to use to pay for an abortion. Anse uses the money to get "new teeth" and quickly marries the woman from whom he borrowed the shovels.

Along with many of Faulkner's works, the story is set in Yoknapatawpha County, Mississippi, which Faulkner referred to as "my apocryphal county", a fictional rendition of the writer's home of Lafayette County in the same state.

== Characters ==
- Addie Bundren – Addie is married to Anse and the mother of Cash, Darl, Jewel, Dewey Dell, and Vardaman.
- Anse Bundren – Anse is Addie's husband, later her widower. He is the father of all the children but Jewel.
- Cash Bundren – Cash is a skilled and helpful carpenter and the eldest son of the family. In his late twenties, he builds Addie's coffin. Throughout the novel, he builds an attachment to his tools and proves to be heroic, but to a fault.
- Darl Bundren – The second eldest of Addie's children, Darl is about two years younger than Cash. Darl is the most articulate character in the book; he narrates 19 of the 59 chapters. Much of the plot is fueled and narrated by Darl as, throughout the book, he descends into insanity.
- Jewel Bundren – Jewel is the third of the Bundren children, most likely around nineteen years of age. A half-brother to the other children and the favorite of Addie, he is the illegitimate son of Addie and Reverend Whitfield. No one, other than Addie, seems to know this.
- Dewey Dell Bundren – Dewey Dell is the only daughter of Anse and Addie Bundren; at seventeen years old, she is the second youngest of the Bundren children. She was impregnated by Lafe and, as the family journeys to Jefferson, she unsuccessfully seeks an abortion.
- Vardaman Bundren – Vardaman is the youngest Bundren child, somewhere between seven and ten years old.
- Vernon Tull – Vernon is a good friend of the Bundrens, who appears in the book as a good farmer, less religious than his wife.
- Cora Tull – Cora is the wife of Vernon Tull. She is very religious and judgmental.
- Eula Tull – Cora and Vernon's daughter.
- Kate Tull – Cora and Vernon's other daughter.
- Peabody – Peabody is the Bundrens' doctor; he narrates two chapters of the book. Anse sends for him shortly before Addie's death, too late for Peabody to do anything more than watch Addie die. Toward the end of the book, when he is working on Cash's leg, Peabody candidly assesses Anse and the entire Bundren family from the perspective of the community at large. Dr. Peabody is also a recurring character in the Yoknapatawpha County universe.
- Lafe – Lafe is a farmer who has impregnated Dewey Dell and given her $10 to get an abortion.
- Reverend Whitfield – Whitfield is the local minister with whom Addie had an affair, resulting in the birth of Jewel.
- Samson – Samson is a local farmer who lets the Bundren family stay with him the first night on their journey to Jefferson. Samson's wife, Rachel, is disgusted with the way the family is treating Addie by dragging her coffin through the countryside.
- Moseley - Moseley is a pharmacist in Mottson who refuses Dewey Dell medicine to abort her and Lafe's unborn child.
- Other narrators: MacGowan and Armstid

== Background and literary techniques ==
Faulkner said that he wrote the novel from midnight to 4:00 a.m. over the course of six weeks and that he did not change a word of it. Faulkner spent the first eight hours of his twelve-hour shift at the University of Mississippi Power House shoveling coal or directing other works and the remaining four hours handwriting his manuscript on unlined onionskin paper.

Throughout the novel, Faulkner presents 15 points of view, each chapter narrated by one character, including Addie, who expresses her thoughts after she has already died. In 59 chapters titled only by their narrators' names, the characters are developed gradually through each other's perceptions and opinions, with Darl's predominating.

As I Lay Dying helped to solidify Faulkner's reputation as a pioneer, like James Joyce and Virginia Woolf, of stream of consciousness. He first used the technique in The Sound and the Fury, and it gives As I Lay Dying its distinctly intimate tone, through the monologues of the Bundrens and the passers-by whom they encounter. Faulkner manipulates conventional differences between stream of consciousness and interior monologue. For example, Faulkner has a character such as Darl speak in an interior monologue with far more intellectual diction (and knowledge of his physical environment) than he realistically possesses. This represents an innovation on conventions of interior monologues; as Dorrit Cohn states in Transparent Minds: Narrative Modes for Presenting Consciousness in Fiction, the language in an interior monologue is "like the language a character speaks to others ... it accords with his time, his place, his social station, level of intelligence ..." The novel represents a progenitor of the Southern Renaissance, reflecting on being, existence, and other existential metaphysics of everyday life.

== Significance ==
As I Lay Dying is consistently ranked among the best novels of 20th-century literature. The novel has been reprinted by the Modern Library, the Library of America, and numerous publishers, including Chatto and Windus in 1970, Random House in 1990, Tandem Library in 1991, Vintage Books in 1996, and the Folio Society in 2013. Faulkner was awarded the Nobel Prize in Literature in 1949 for his novels prior to that date, with this book being among them.

The novel has also directly influenced a number of other critically acclaimed books, including British author Graham Swift's 1996 Booker Prize-winning novel Last Orders, Suzan-Lori Parks's Getting Mother's Body, and Jesmyn Ward's Sing, Unburied, Sing.

The Grammy-nominated metalcore band As I Lay Dying derived its name from the novel.

The character of Darl Bundren later appeared in Faulkner's 1935 short story "Uncle Willy".

== Adaptations ==
The French translation of the novel was adapted into a graphic novel by the artist André Juillard in 1991.

An adaptation of the novel by Edward Kemp was staged by the Young Vic company in May 1998.

A film adaptation, directed and co-written by James Franco, was released in 2013.

Preceded by The Sound and the Fury	Novels set in Yoknapatawpha County	Succeeded by Sanctuary
