= University, Mississippi =

- Census-designated place
- Location in Mississippi Location in the United States
- Coordinates: 34°21′56″N 89°32′16″W
- Country: United States
- State: Mississippi
- County: Lafayette

Area
  - Total: 0.70 sq mi (1.82 km^{2})
  - Land: 0.70 sq mi (1.82 km^{2})
  - Water: 0 sq mi (0.00 km^{2})
- Elevation: 502 ft (153 m)

Population (2020)
  - Total: 4,696
  - Density: 6,667.0/sq mi (2,574.13/km^{2})
- Time zone: UTC−6 (Central (CST))
  - Summer (DST): UTC−5 (CDT)
- ZIP Code: 38677
- Area code: 662
- FIPS code: 28-75520
- GNIS feature ID: 2586613

University is a census-designated place (CDP) and the official name for an area covering a portion of the University of Mississippi (Ole Miss) campus, in Lafayette County, Mississippi, United States. The CDP is surrounded by the city of Oxford. Its official United States Postal Service designation is "University, Mississippi", with a ZIP Code of 38677.

As of the 2020 census, University had a population of 4,696. while the 2014 enrollment for Ole Miss was 20,112 in 2014.

The University CDP is an enclave surrounded by the city of Oxford, west of its downtown area. It has an area of 0.70 square miles (1.82 km^{2}), all of it recorded as land.

== Demographics ==
Historical population
Census	Pop.	Note	%±
2010	4,202		—
2020	4,696		11.8%
U.S. Decennial Census

University first appeared as a census designated place in the 2010 U.S. census.

=== 2020 census ===
As of the 2020 census, University had a population of 4,696. The median age was 19.6 years. 0.4% of residents were under the age of 18 and 0.1% of residents were 65 years of age or older. For every 100 females there were 75.7 males, and for every 100 females age 18 and over there were 75.6 males age 18 and over.

100.0% of residents lived in urban areas, while 0.0% lived in rural areas.

There were 12 households in University, of which 16.7% had children under the age of 18 living in them. Of all households, 8.3% were married-couple households, 25.0% were households with a male householder and no spouse or partner present, and 58.3% were households with a female householder and no spouse or partner present. About 41.7% of all households were made up of individuals and 0.0% had someone living alone who was 65 years of age or older.

There were 33 housing units, of which 63.6% were vacant. The homeowner vacancy rate was 0.0% and the rental vacancy rate was 57.1%.

Racial composition as of the 2020 census
Race	Number	Percent
White	3,804	81.0%
Black or African American	529	11.3%
American Indian and Alaska Native	9	0.2%
Asian	112	2.4%
Native Hawaiian and Other Pacific Islander	0	0.0%
Some other race	44	0.9%
Two or more races	198	4.2%
Hispanic or Latino (of any race)	182	3.9%

== Education ==
The CDP is in the Oxford School District. The district operates Oxford High School.

== Climate ==
According to the Köppen Climate Classification system, university has a humid subtropical climate, abbreviated "Cfa" on climate maps. The hottest temperature recorded in University was 110 °F (43.3 °C) on September 5, 1925, while the coldest temperature recorded was −13 °F (−25.0 °C) on January 21, 1985.

Climate data for University, Mississippi, 1991–2020 normals, extremes 1893–present
Month	Jan	Feb	Mar	Apr	May	Jun	Jul	Aug	Sep	Oct	Nov	Dec	Year
Record high °F (°C)	80 (27)	84 (29)	91 (33)	93 (34)	98 (37)	104 (40)	108 (42)	107 (42)	110 (43)	98 (37)	89 (32)	81 (27)	110 (43)
Mean maximum °F (°C)	72.1 (22.3)	75.2 (24.0)	82.2 (27.9)	87.0 (30.6)	90.8 (32.7)	94.9 (34.9)	97.1 (36.2)	97.7 (36.5)	94.8 (34.9)	89.4 (31.9)	80.1 (26.7)	72.8 (22.7)	98.8 (37.1)
Mean daily maximum °F (°C)	52.3 (11.3)	57.1 (13.9)	65.8 (18.8)	74.2 (23.4)	82.0 (27.8)	88.6 (31.4)	91.3 (32.9)	91.0 (32.8)	86.2 (30.1)	76.1 (24.5)	64.3 (17.9)	55.0 (12.8)	73.7 (23.1)
Daily mean °F (°C)	41.4 (5.2)	45.1 (7.3)	53.5 (11.9)	61.6 (16.4)	70.4 (21.3)	77.7 (25.4)	80.7 (27.1)	79.8 (26.6)	73.9 (23.3)	62.6 (17.0)	51.9 (11.1)	44.2 (6.8)	61.9 (16.6)
Mean daily minimum °F (°C)	30.6 (−0.8)	33.8 (1.0)	41.2 (5.1)	48.9 (9.4)	58.9 (14.9)	66.8 (19.3)	70.2 (21.2)	68.6 (20.3)	61.6 (16.4)	49.2 (9.6)	39.5 (4.2)	33.3 (0.7)	50.2 (10.1)
Mean minimum °F (°C)	12.2 (−11.0)	17.3 (−8.2)	22.5 (−5.3)	31.5 (−0.3)	42.2 (5.7)	55.3 (12.9)	61.1 (16.2)	59.3 (15.2)	45.7 (7.6)	32.2 (0.1)	22.3 (−5.4)	17.5 (−8.1)	9.7 (−12.4)
Record low °F (°C)	−13 (−25)	−10 (−23)	7 (−14)	21 (−6)	31 (−1)	43 (6)	50 (10)	48 (9)	32 (0)	20 (−7)	6 (−14)	−10 (−23)	−13 (−25)
Average precipitation inches (mm)	5.13 (130)	5.82 (148)	5.61 (142)	6.30 (160)	5.35 (136)	5.22 (133)	4.35 (110)	3.90 (99)	3.99 (101)	4.10 (104)	4.30 (109)	6.45 (164)	60.52 (1,536)
Average snowfall inches (cm)	0.8 (2.0)	0.2 (0.51)	0.1 (0.25)	0.0 (0.0)	0.0 (0.0)	0.0 (0.0)	0.0 (0.0)	0.0 (0.0)	0.0 (0.0)	0.0 (0.0)	0.0 (0.0)	0.1 (0.25)	1.2 (3.01)
Average precipitation days (≥ 0.01 in)	12.0	10.8	11.7	10.3	11.0	10.2	10.0	8.8	7.4	7.9	9.8	12.2	122.1
Average snowy days (≥ 0.1 in)	0.6	0.4	0.1	0.0	0.0	0.0	0.0	0.0	0.0	0.0	0.0	0.3	1.4
Source 1: NOAA
Source 2: National Weather Service
