= Oxford High School (Mississippi) =

Public high school in Oxford, Mississippi, United States

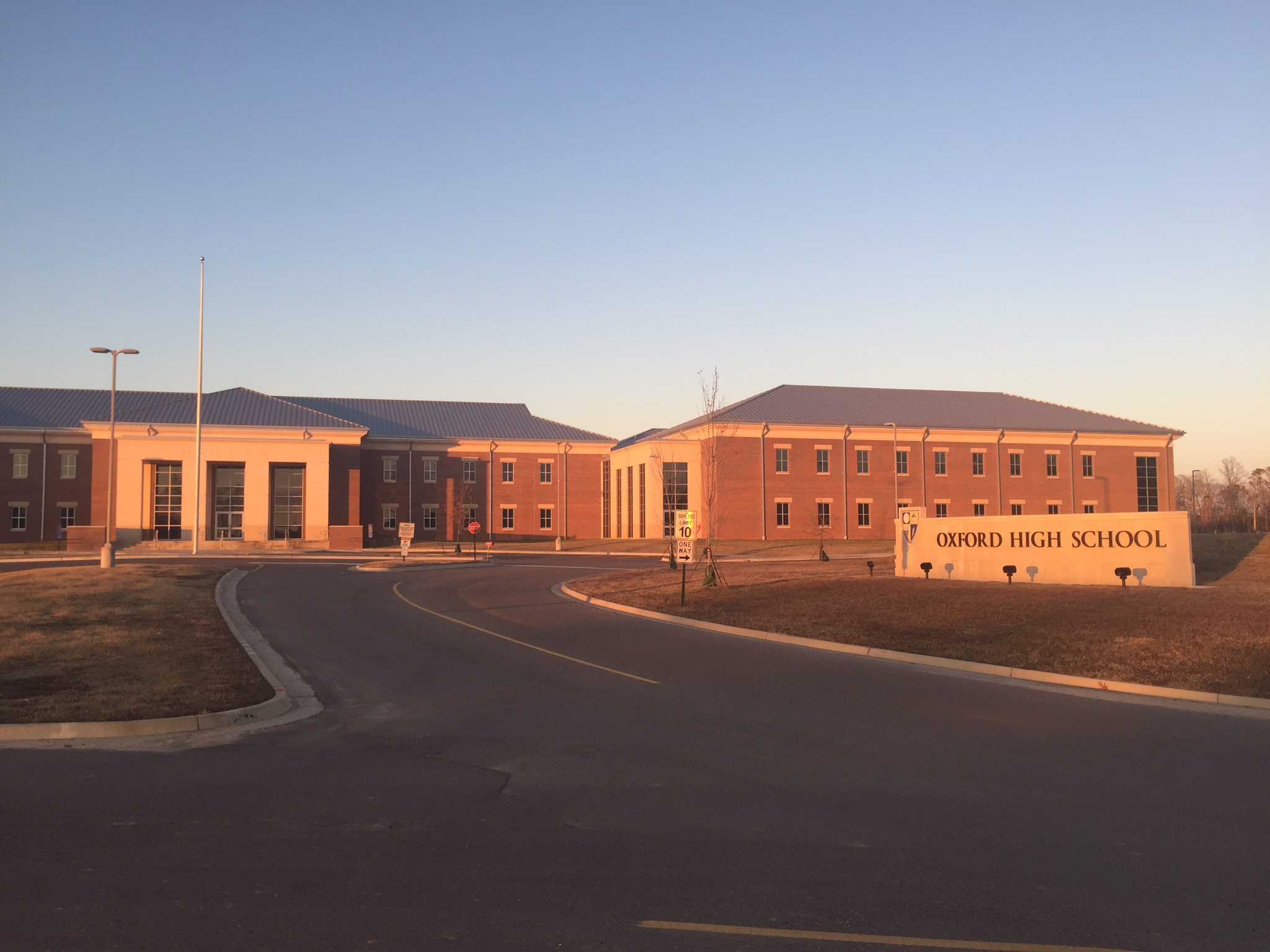

Location
- 101 Charger Loop; Oxford, Mississippi 38655; United States; 34.3737°N 89.4876°W

Information
- Motto: "First in Class - The Oxford Way"
- Established: 1886
- School district: Oxford School District
- Superintendent: Bradley Roberson
- Principal: Jacob Rousseau
- Staff: 88.25 (FTE)
- Grades: 9–12
- Enrollment: 1,370 (2023-2024)
- Student to teacher ratio: 15.52
- Colors: Royal blue Gold
- Mascot: The Charger
- Newspaper: theChargerOnline
- Yearbook: Flashback
- Website: www.oxfordsd.org/ohs

Oxford High School (OHS) is a public high school in Oxford, Mississippi, United States. It educates 1,210 students in grades nine through twelve. It is part of the Oxford School District.

Its boundary includes almost all of Oxford, the University census-designated place, and some unincorporated areas.

== History ==
High-school students first attended public school in Oxford in 1886 when a building was erected to accommodate twelve grades. The University High School was the primary school in Oxford until 1963 when the town was integrated and the Oxford School District was formed.

As the city of Oxford grew, so did the student population. A transition to class 5A in 2008 was followed up by a move to 6A, Mississippi's highest classification. In 2014, Oxford High School relocated and moved into a new $30 million building at 101 Charger Loop, due to the increasing number of students. The former building, which stood as the high school for nearly half a century, became the middle school for grades 7 and 8 in the district.

== Arts ==
Between 2007 and 2017, the OHS Theatre program was invited five times to the American High School Theater Festival at the Fringe Festival in Edinburgh, Scotland.

The school runs The Charger magazine.

== Athletics ==
The Oxford Chargers have won the Mississippi High School Athletic Association's All Sports Award 4A or 5A in several years, fulfilling a commitment to being a first-class athletic program.

Sports programs at Oxford High School include baseball, basketball, bowling, cheerleading, cross country, dance, fastpitch softball, football, golf, powerlifting, slowpitch softball, soccer, swimming, tennis, track and field, volleyball, and wrestling.

On December 7, 2019, the Oxford High School varsity football team completed a post-halftime comeback to win its first state title against Oak Grove, winning 31-21.

== Notable alumni ==
- Edward Aschoff — sports reporter
- Larry Brown — writer
- Jarkel Joiner — NBA Player
- Sam Kendricks — pole vaulter, 2016 Olympics bronze medalist, 2024 Olympics silver medalist
- Grae Kessinger — professional baseball shortstop
- Shelby McEwen — high jumper, 2024 Olympic silver medalist
- DK Metcalf — NFL wide receiver
- Karlous Miller — comedian
- JJ Pegues — college football defensive tackle
