= University of Mississippi Power House =

Coordinates: 34.363931°N 89.533283°W

The University of Mississippi Power House was located on the campus of the University of Mississippi in Oxford, Mississippi. The original building was constructed in 1908 as a central power plant for the entire campus.

Author William Faulkner was employed by the University of Mississippi in the Power House through the winter of 1929 as a night supervisor. At that time, the plant would supply power during the night for both the University of Mississippi and the town of Oxford, Mississippi. The low power demand during the evening and the redundancy of the supervisory position offered Faulkner time to write, which he did using the back of a wheelbarrow. The resulting work was published in 1930 as As I Lay Dying.

The University of Mississippi Power House was demolished by the University in the spring of 2016. The University of Mississippi plans to construct a commemorative space near the same location using a $5 million donation from the Gertrude C. Ford Foundation.

== Gallery ==
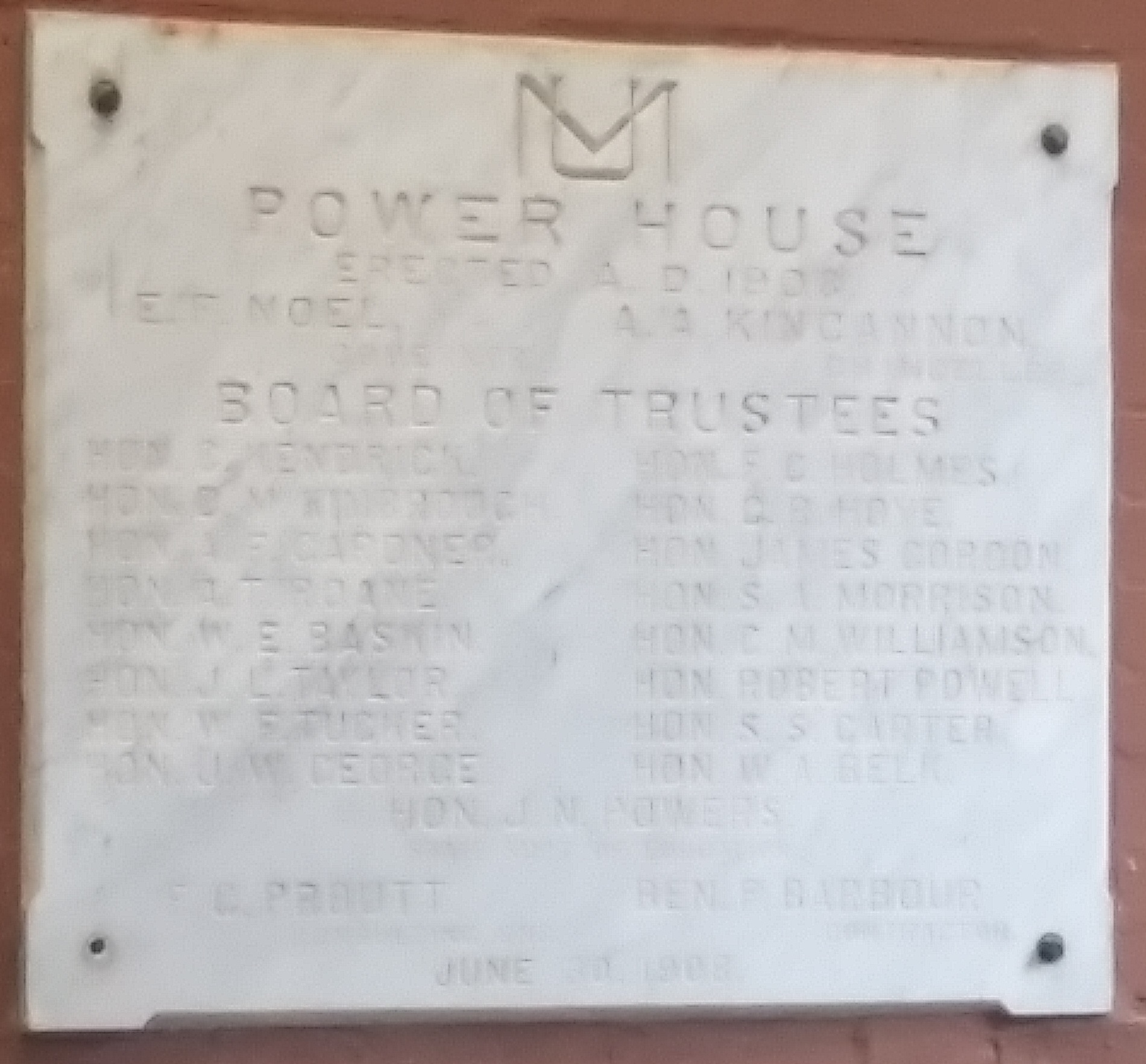
University of Mississippi Power House Cornerstone

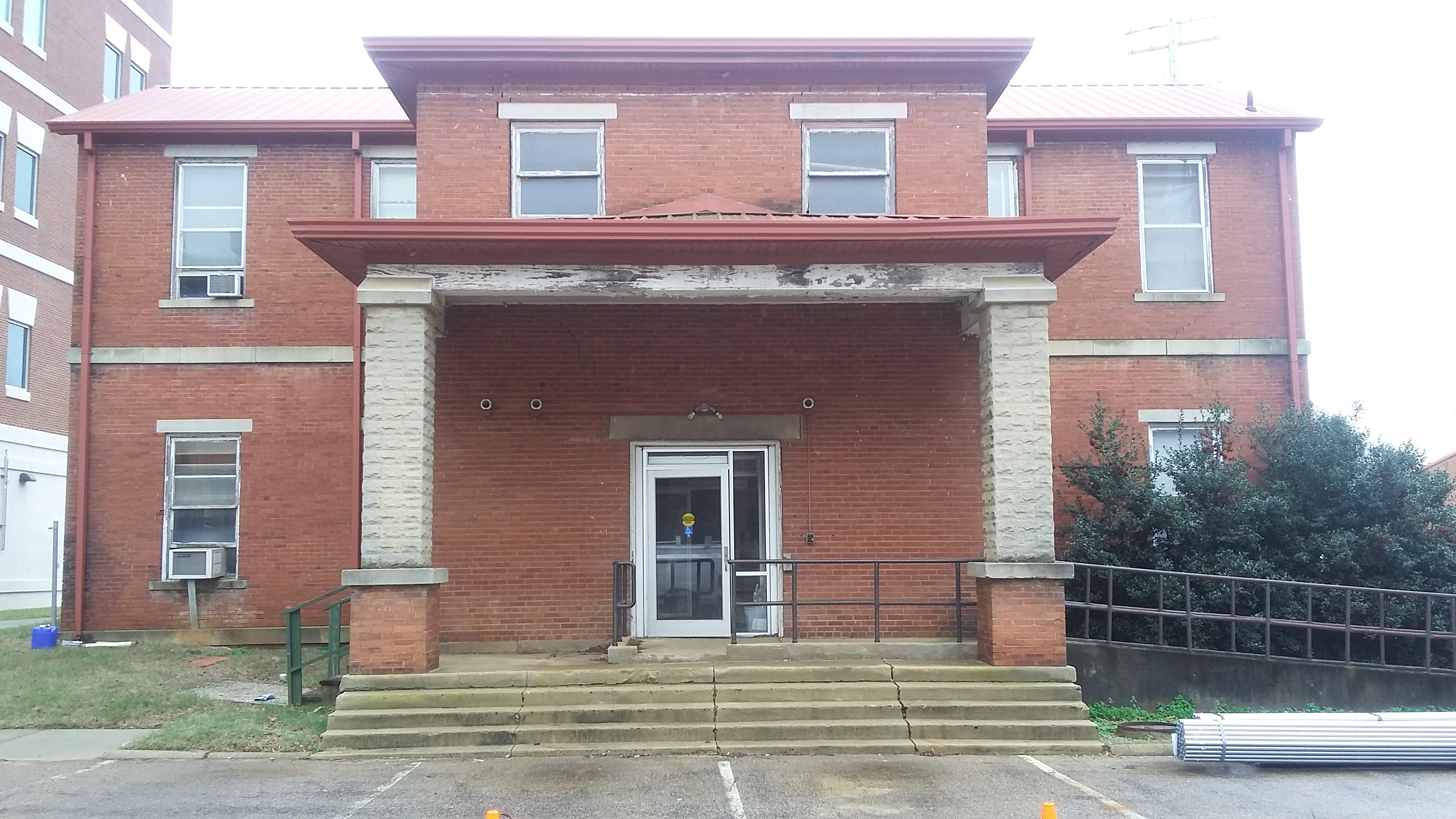
University of Mississippi Power House Front Facing

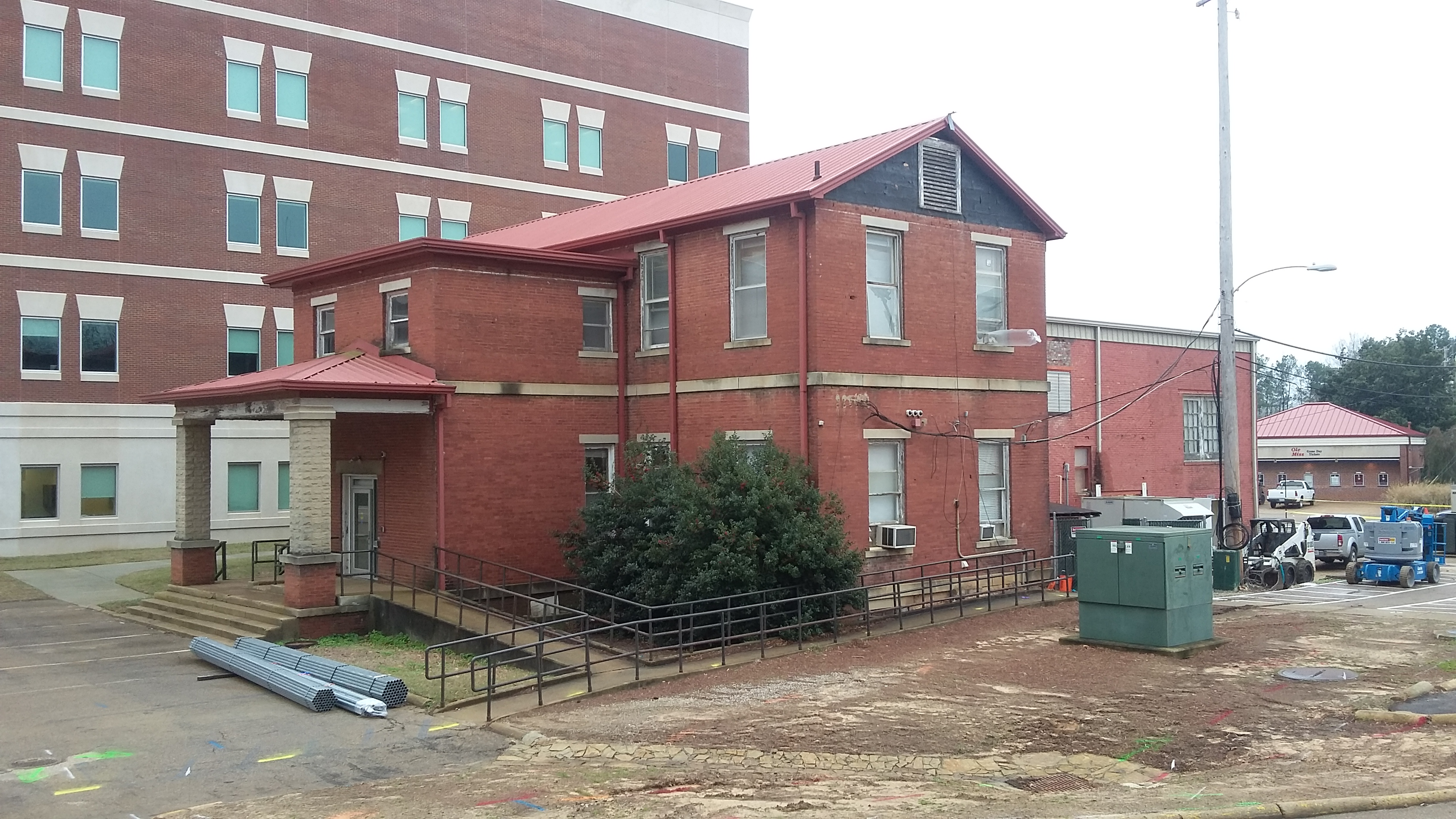
University of Mississippi Power House NW Facing

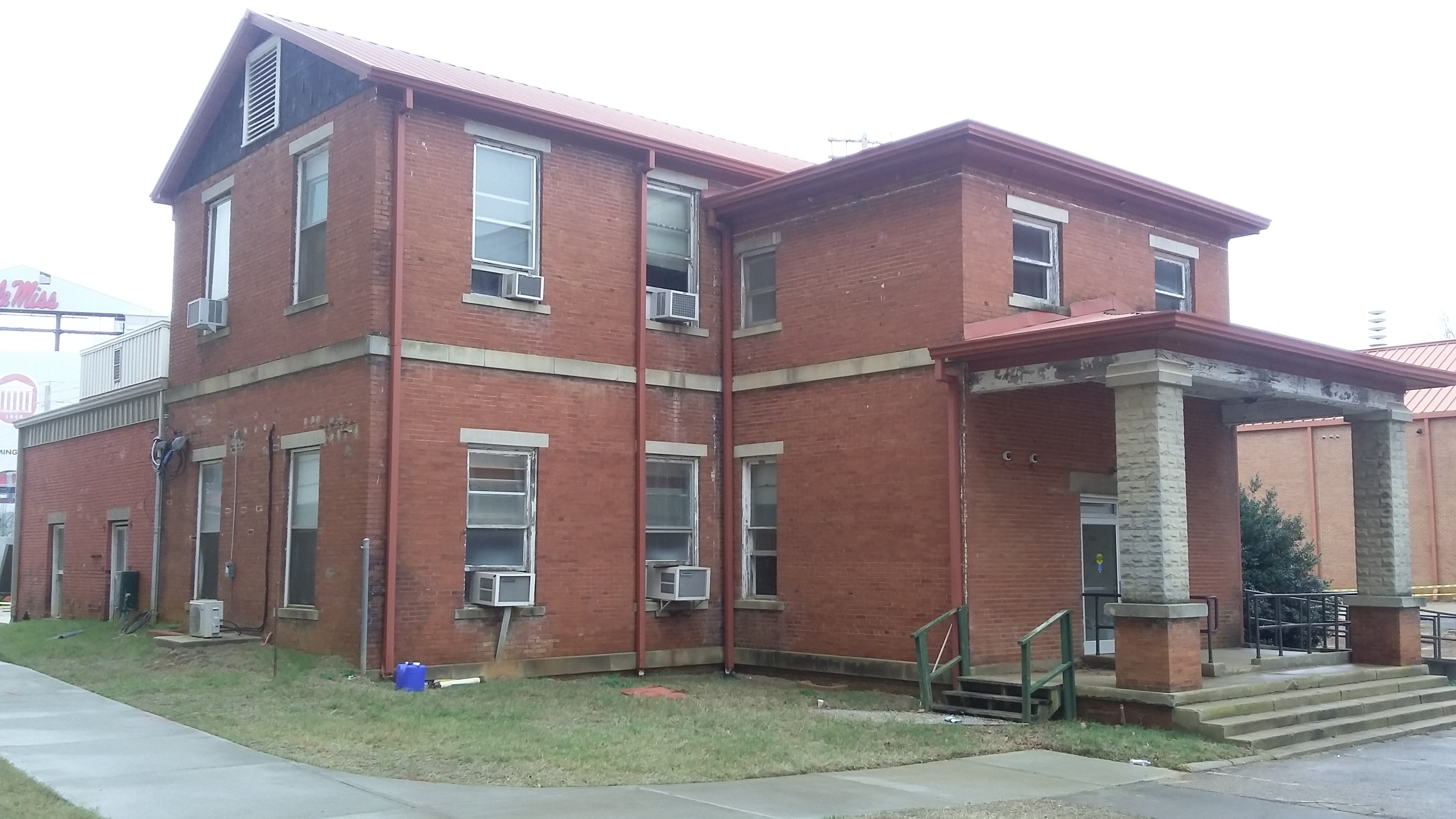
University of Mississippi Power House NE Facing

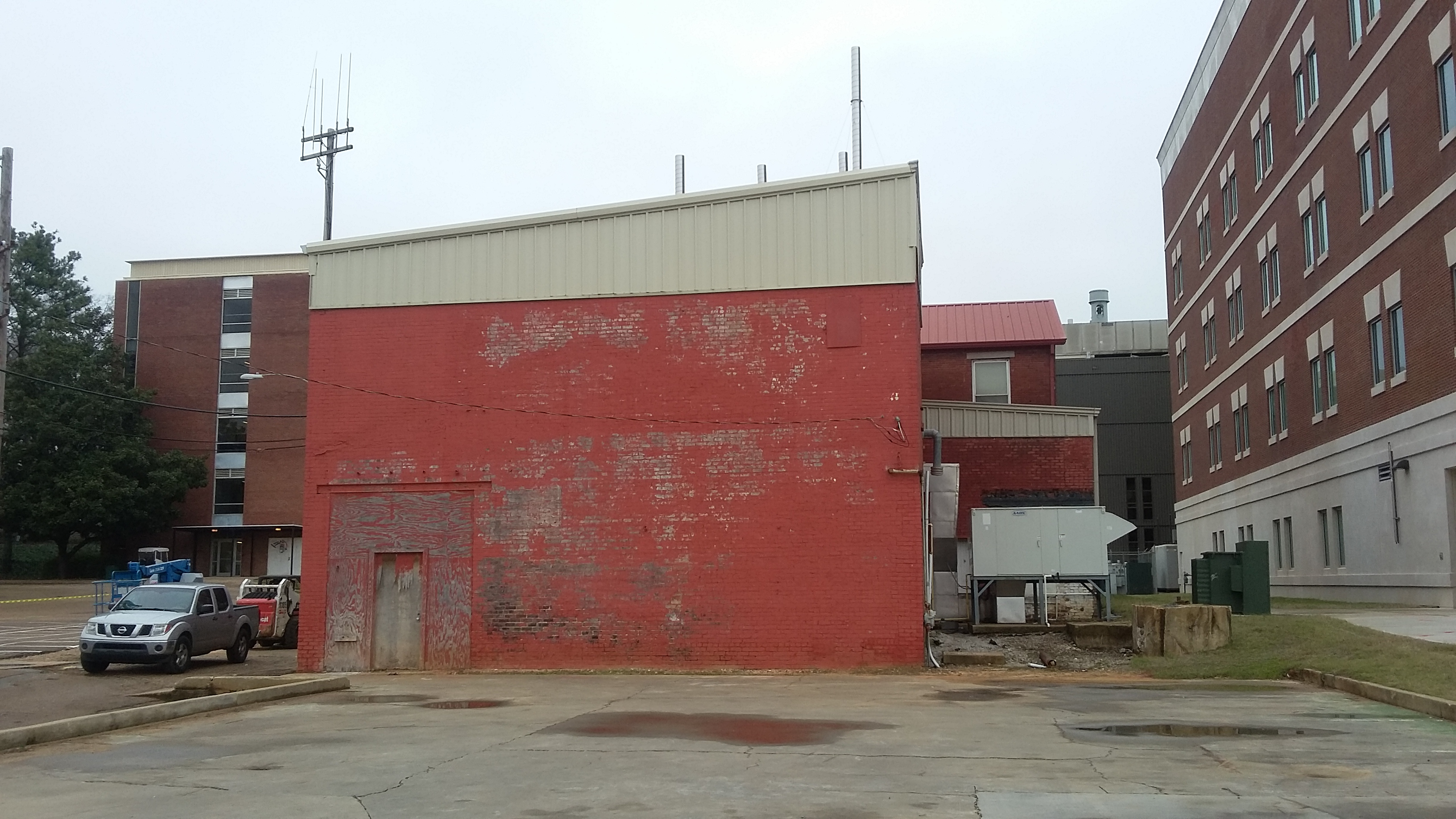
University of Mississippi Power House Rear Facing

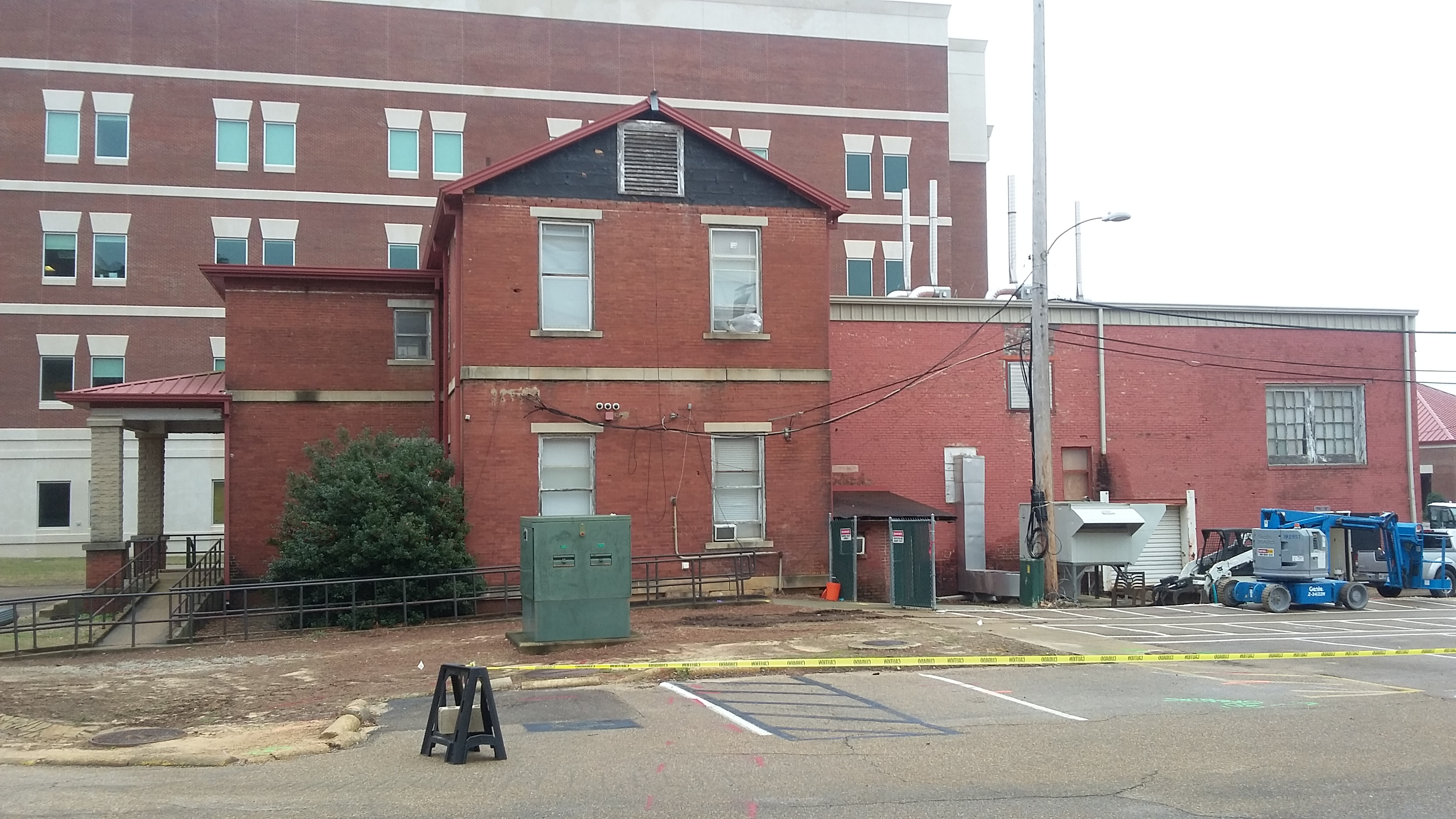
University of Mississippi Power House West Facing
