= Oxford School District =

School district in Mississippi

Coordinates: 34.369041°N 89.507278°W

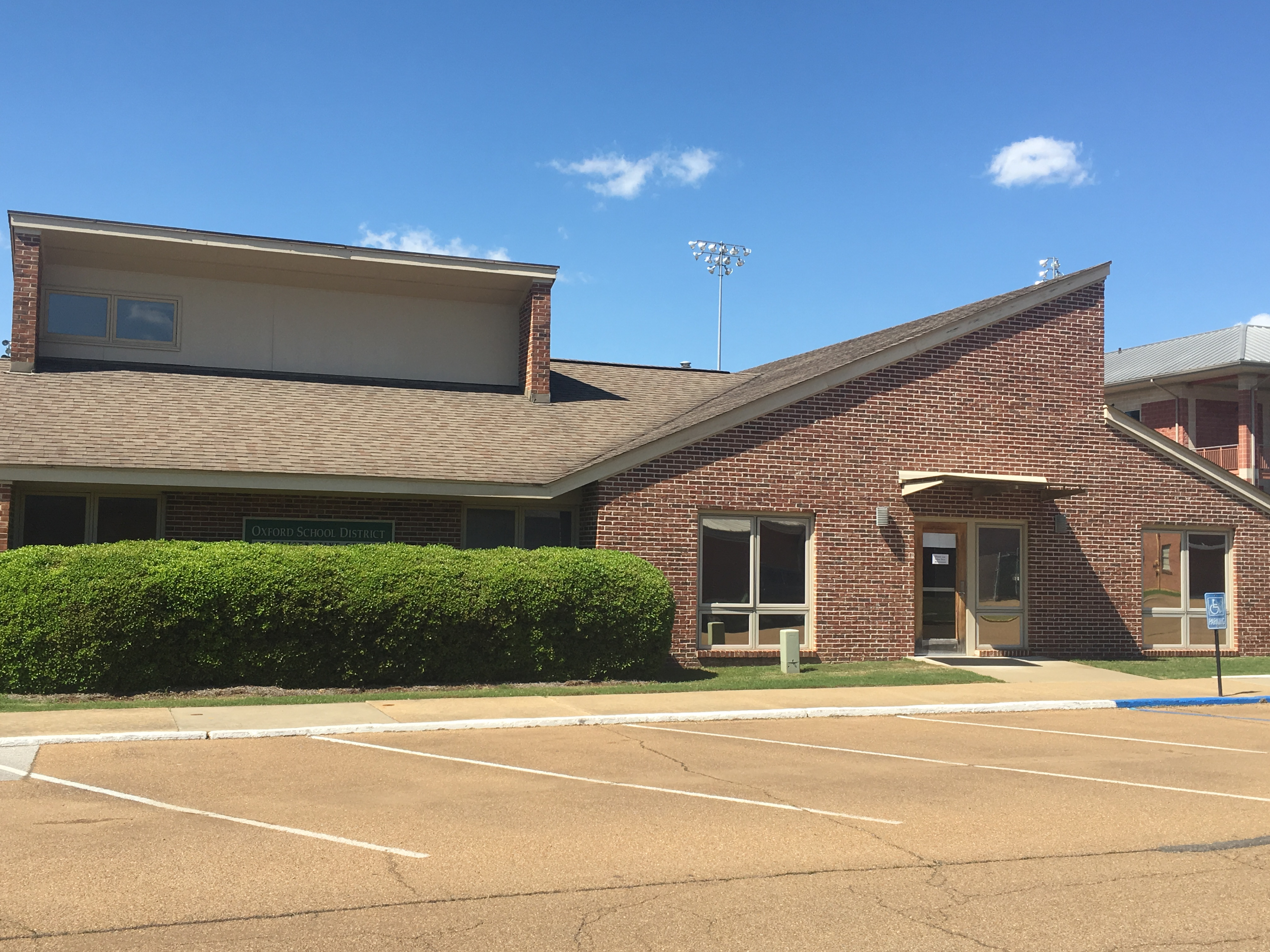
Image of the Oxford, Mississippi School District Office

The Oxford School District is a public school district based in Oxford, Mississippi.

Its boundary includes almost all of Oxford, the University census-designated place, and some unincorporated areas.

== School board ==
The district is governed by a six-member elected board of trustees. There are two Office of the Board positions, President and Secretary, that are annually elected by the district for one-year terms at the end of each fiscal year. By law, at least two board members must be appointed by the Board of Alderman and remaining members are elected by county residents living within the Municipal Separate School District. As of May 2017 the school board members are: S. Ray Hill; Marian Barksdale, President; Romana Reed; Brian Harvey, Superintendent; Gray Edmondson, Secretary; and Scott Shipman.

== Superintendent ==
The superintendent is voted on and elected by the school board. From 2013 through 2017 the superintendent was Brian Harvey. Harvey graduated from the district in 1990 and worked in the district for 17 years; as a middle and high school teacher, the assistant principal at Oxford High School, and the principal at both Central Elementary and Oxford Middle School. While serving as interim superintendent, Harvey was appointed after the previous superintendent, Kim Stasny, died from a short illness. In 2021, Bradley Robertson was announced as the new superintendent.

== Schools ==
Secondary schools

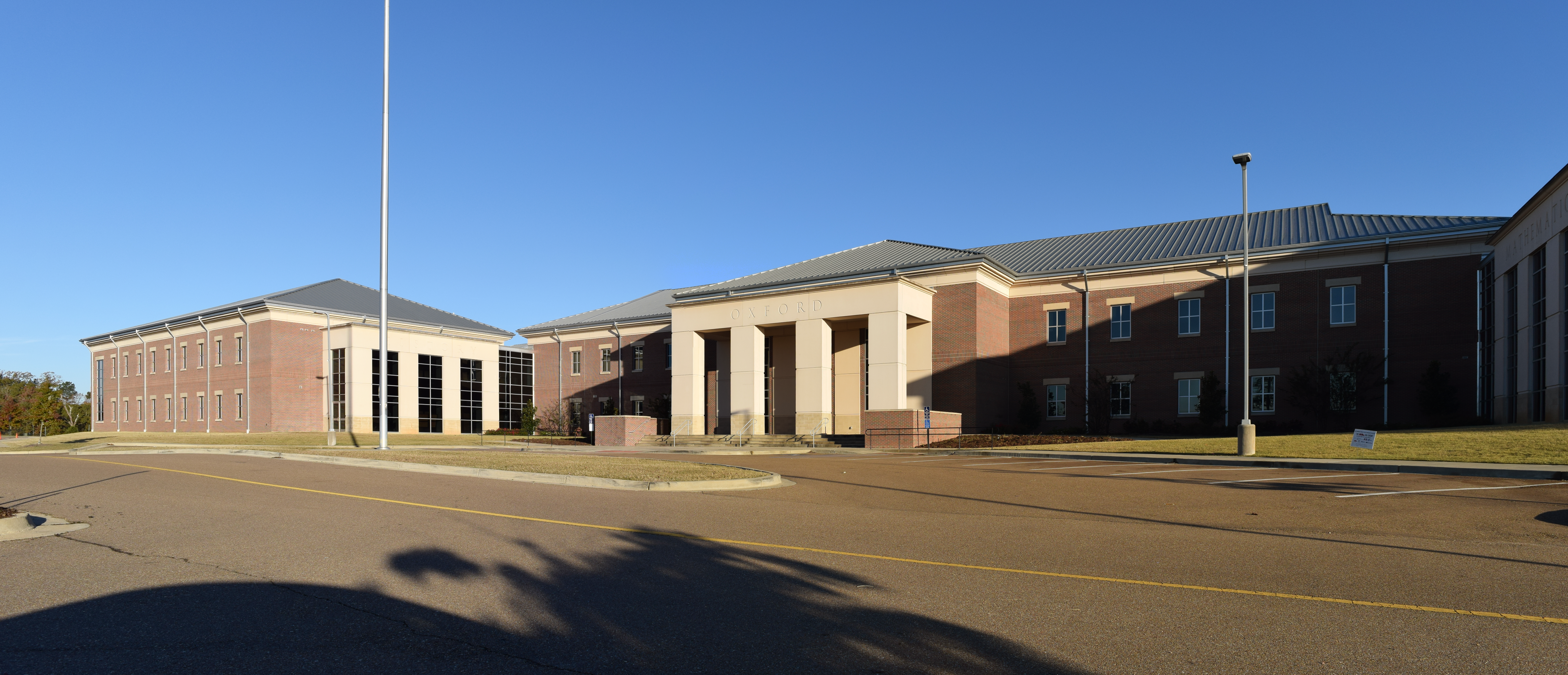
Oxford High School

- Oxford High School (Grades 9 through 12)
- Oxford Middle School (Grades 7 through 8)

Elementary schools

- Oxford Intermediate School (Grades 5 and 6)
- Della Davidson Elementary School (Grades 3 and 4)
- Central Elementary School (Grades 1 and 2)
- Bramlett Elementary School (Grades Pre-K through K)

Central Elementary School was previously known as Oxford Elementary School. The school was renamed in 2019 in order to honor Oxford's African-American school pre-integration, Central High School.

Alternative schools

- C.M. Scott Center (Special Needs)
- Oxford Learning Center (Grades 6 and 12)

In the Jim Crow era, where white and black students attended separate schools, the "Negro Elementary and High School" housed black students. Construction began and ended in 1938 and 1939, respectively. The Public Works Administration (PWA) was involved in the building of this school.

== Demographics ==
=== 2006-07 school year ===
There were a total of 3,356 students enrolled in the Oxford School District during the 2006–2007 school year. The gender makeup of the district was 50% female and 50% male. The racial makeup of the district was 43.65% African American, 49.70% White, 2.18% Hispanic, 4.32% Asian, and 0.15% Native American. 41.9% of the district's students were eligible to receive free lunch.

=== Previous school years ===
School Year	Enrollment	Gender Makeup		Racial Makeup				
School Year	Enrollment	Female	Male	Asian	African American	Hispanic	Native American	White
2007-08	3,360	48%	52%	4.17%	42.32%	No Data	No Data	50%
2006-07	3,356	50%	50%	4.32%	43.65%	2.18%	0.15%	49.70%
2005-06	3,320	50%	50%	4.13%	44.55%	2.02%	0.12%	49.19%
2004-05	3,169	50%	50%	3.72%	45.69%	1.61%	0.22%	48.75%
2003-04	3,118	49%	51%	3.40%	44.68%	1.64%	0.16%	50.13%
2002-03	3,198	49%	51%	3.38%	42.68%	1.66%	0.13%	52.16%

== Accountability statistics ==
	2006-07	2005-06	2004-05	2003-04	2002-03
District Accreditation Status	Accredited	Accredited	Accredited	Accredited	Accredited
School Performance Classifications
Level 5 (Superior Performing) Schools	2	2	2	3	2
Level 4 (Exemplary) Schools	1	2	2	1	1
Level 3 (Successful) Schools	1	0	0	0	1
Level 2 (Under Performing) Schools	0	0	0	0	0
Level 1 (Low Performing) Schools	0	0	0	0	0
Not Assigned	1	1	1	1	1

== District Report Card ==
The Mississippi Statewide Accountability System provides performance ratings of A, B, C, D, and F for public school districts in the state, with A as the highest score and F as the lowest. These ratings are based on established standards such as " student achievement, individual student growth, graduation rate, and participation rate." Data is available from the 2017-2018 school year until the 2020-2021 school year.

District Report Card Scores Per School Year (2017-2021)
	Bramlett Elementary School	Della Davidson Elementary	Central Elementary School (previously Oxford Elementary)	Oxford Intermediate School	Oxford Middle School	Oxford High School
2017-2018	A	A	A	B	B	A
2018-2019	A	A	A	B	A	B
2019-2020	A	A	A	B	A	B
2020-2021	A	A	A	B	A	B

== See also ==
- List of school districts in Mississippi
