= Dorrit Cohn =

Literature scholar

Dorrit Cohn (9 August 1924 – 10 March 2012) was an Austrian-born scholar of German and Comparative Literature whose work centered on the formal analysis of narrative fiction.

== Life ==
Dorrit Cohn was born in Vienna in 1924. Her family left Austria only a few days before the Anschluss in 1938. She immigrated to the United States with her family in 1939, attending the Lycée Français in New York City. She studied physics (AB, 1945) and Comparative Literature (AM, 1946) at Radcliffe College. She started graduate work in Comparative Literature at Yale and resumed it after an 11-year hiatus, earning a Ph.D. in German from Stanford. Her dissertation (basis of her 1966 book) was on Hermann Broch's 1930-32 novel Die Schlafwandler. She taught at Indiana University from 1964 before moving to Harvard in June 1971, where (as one of the first women professors with tenure) she taught Comparative and German Literature as the Ernest Bernbaum Professor of Literature.

She retired in 1995, and her final years were spent in Durham, North Carolina.

== Work ==
Dorrit Cohn's main work was in narratology. Her most prominent work, Transparent Minds (1978), studies how characters' consciousnesses are reflected in fiction in a variety of first- and third-person works, mostly from the 19th-century Realist and 20th-century Modernist traditions. Her work in this area was closely related to that of Gérard Genette and Franz Stanzel, with both of whom she had productive exchanges about the best way to analyze how consciousness is presented in fiction.

Toward the end of her life she became very interested in the formal differences between fictional and non-fictional narratives; her 1999 book The Distinction of Fiction treats works by Freud and Proust, the fictional biography Marbot by Wolfgang Hildesheimer (who had also written a best-selling biography of Mozart), Thomas Mann's Death in Venice, and historical novels by Stendhal and Tolstoy. The book won the MLA’s Aldo and Jeanne Scaglione Prize for Comparative Literature Studies.

In addition to the two books, she published many articles on works of fiction in German and other languages. She also had an abiding interest in Freud and Freudian interpretation.

== Selected bibliography ==
- "K Enters The Castle: On the Change of Person in Kafka's Manuscript." Euphorion 62 (1968): 28–45.
- "Kleist's 'Marquise von O...': The Problem of Knowledge." Monatshefte 67 (1975): 129–44.
- Transparent Minds: Narrative Modes for Presenting Consciousness in Fiction (Princeton University Press, 1978)
- "The Encirclement of Narrative: On Franz Stanzel's Theorie des Erzählens." Poetics Today 2 (1981): 157–82.
- (with Gerard Genette). "Nouveaux nouveaux discours du récit." Poétique 61 (1985): 101–09. [commentary on Genette's Nouveaux discours du récit with Genette's response]
- "Wilhelm Meister's dream: reading Goethe with Freud." The German Quarterly 62 (1989): 459–72.
- "Ein eigentlich träumerischer Doppelsinn: telling timelessness in Der Zauberberg." Germanisch-Romanische Monatsschrift 44 (1994): 425–39.
- The Distinction of Fiction (Johns Hopkins University Press, 1999)
