= Barry Hannah =

American author

- Born: April 23, 1942 Meridian, Mississippi, U.S.
- Died: March 1, 2010 (aged 67) Oxford, Mississippi, U.S.
- Occupation: Short story writer; novelist; professor
- Education: Mississippi College (BA); University of Arkansas (MA, MFA)
- Period: 1965–2010
- Genre: Short story, novel
- Children: 3

Barry Hannah (April 23, 1942 – March 1, 2010) was an American novelist and short story writer from Mississippi. Hannah was born in Meridian, Mississippi, on April 23, 1942, and grew up in Clinton, Mississippi. He wrote eight novels and five short story collections.

His first novel, Geronimo Rex (1972), was nominated for the National Book Award. Airships, his 1978 collection of short stories about the Vietnam War, the American Civil War, and the modern South, won the Arnold Gingrich Short Fiction Award. The following year, Hannah received the prestigious Award in Literature from the American Academy and Institute of Arts and Letters. Hannah won a Guggenheim, the Robert Penn Warren Lifetime Achievement Award, and the PEN/Malamud Award for excellence in the art of the short story.

Hannah was twice the recipient of a Mississippi Institute of Arts and Letters Award in Fiction and received Mississippi's prestigious Governor's Award in 1989 for distinguished representation of the state of Mississippi in artistic and cultural matters. For a brief time Hannah lived in Los Angeles and worked as a writer for the film director Robert Altman. He was director of the MFA program at the University of Mississippi in Oxford, where he taught creative writing for 28 years. He died on March 1, 2010, of a heart attack.

== Early life ==
Hannah was born in Meridian, Mississippi, on April 23, 1942, and grew up in Clinton, Mississippi. He had three children, a daughter Lee and two sons, Barry Jr. and Ted. He was married three times, the last to Susan (Varas) Hannah (1946–2010).

== Education ==
At Mississippi College, Hannah majored in pre-med but later switched to literature. He earned a Bachelor of Arts degree from Mississippi College in Clinton in 1964. He spent the next three years at the University of Arkansas, where he earned a Master of Arts in 1966 and a Master of Fine Arts in 1967.

== Writing ==
Barry Hannah's fictions contain situational humor that spans a wide gamut, from the surreal to grotesque and black humor. His first publication was a story that was placed in a national anthology of the best college writing when he was a student at the University of Arkansas. Soon after that, Hannah wrote "Mother Rooney Unscrolls the Hurt":

And then I wrote my first truly good story, "Mother Rooney Unscrolls the Hurt," which was a piece of my then-forthcoming book, Geronimo Rex. I was about twenty-three. It really lit up for me, I thought. I don't really care what folks think of it now, but "Mother Rooney" was a springboard to the rest of my creative life.

Hannah's first novel, the grotesque coming-of-age tale Geronimo Rex (1972), was nominated for the National Book Award. Nightwatchmen (1973), his second novel, was a difficult book, and it is his only work never to be reissued in paperback. Hannah returned to form, however, with the short-story collection Airships (1978). Most of the stories in the volume were first published in Esquire magazine by its fiction editor at the time, Gordon Lish. The short novel Ray (1980) was a critical success and a minor breakthrough for Hannah, and one of his best-known novels.

After the grotesque Western pastiche Never Die (1991), Hannah stuck to short stories for the rest of the decade, first with the immense Bats Out of Hell (1993), which featured 23 stories over close to 400 pages, making it Hannah's longest book, and then with High Lonesome (1996), which was nominated for the Pulitzer Prize. After a near-fatal bout with non-Hodgkin lymphoma, Hannah returned in 2001 with Yonder Stands Your Orphan (the title is taken from Bob Dylan's song "It's All Over Now, Baby Blue"), his longest novel since Geronimo Rex. In this novel, Hannah returned to a small community north of Vicksburg and to some of the characters featured in stories from Airships and Bats Out of Hell.

Hannah attempted one more novel, which underwent several title changes. In a 2003 interview with the Austin Chronicle, Hannah called it Last Days. A 2005 interview with Hannah in The Paris Review featured a manuscript page from the then-titled Long, Last, Happy. Then a 2009 issue of the literary journal Gulf Coast featured an excerpt from the novel, titled Sick Soldier at Your Door. The same excerpt was printed in the June 2009 issue of Harper's Magazine. A subsequent interview with Tom Franklin in the Summer 2009 issue of Tin House revealed that Sick Soldier at Your Door had been reconceived as a collection of short stories. The stories were published in November 2011 by Grove Press under the title Long, Last, Happy: New and Selected Stories.

== Teaching ==
Hannah taught creative writing at the Iowa Writers' Workshop, Clemson University, Bennington College, Middlebury College, the University of Alabama, Texas State University, and the University of Montana - Missoula. He was a frequent visiting writer at the summer creative writing seminars at Sewanee.

Hannah was the director of the M.F.A. program at the University of Mississippi, where he was known as a "generous mentor". Early during his tenure at the University of Mississippi, he came to class drunk and was known for "drinking heavily". His students included Larry Brown, Bob Shacochis, Donna Tartt and Wells Tower.

== Death ==
Hannah died of a heart attack in Oxford, Mississippi, on March 1, 2010, at the age of 67. His death was just days before the 17th annual Oxford Conference for the Book, held in his hometown. Hannah and his work were the focus of that year's conference.

== Awards ==
- The William Faulkner Prize, given by the University of Rennes
- The Bellaman Foundation Award in Fiction
- The Arnold Gingrich Short Fiction Award
- The Award for Literature from the American Academy of Arts and Letters
- The PEN/Malamud Award for Short Fiction
- Robert Penn Warren Lifetime Achievement Award
- Guggenheim Fellowship (1983)

== Publications ==
=== Novels ===
- Geronimo Rex (1972)
- Night-Watchmen (1973)
- Ray (1980)
- The Tennis Handsome (1983)
- Hey Jack! (1987)
- Boomerang (1989)
- Never Die (1991)
- Yonder Stands Your Orphan (2001)

=== Story collections ===
- Airships (1978)
- Captain Maximus (1985)
- Bats out of Hell (1993)
- High Lonesome (1996)
- Long, Last, Happy: New and Selected Stories (Nov. 2010)

=== Essays ===
- "Memories of Tennessee Williams", Mississippi Review, Vol. 48, 1995.
- "Introduction" The Book of Mark, Pocket Canon, Grove-Atlantic, 1999.
