= Barn Burning =

Short story by William Faulkner

- Short story by William Faulkner
- Country: United States
- Language: English
- Genre: Southern Gothic

Publication
- Published in: Harper's Magazine
- Publication date: June 1939

"Barn Burning" is a short story by the American author William Faulkner. First appearing in Harper's Magazine in June 1939, it has since been widely anthologized. The story deals with class conflicts, vengeance, and family ties as viewed by a child. It precedes The Hamlet, The Town, and The Mansion—the three novels that make up Faulkner's Snopes trilogy.

Largely set in Faulkner's fictional Mississippi county, Yoknapatawpha, "Barn Burning" centers on a young boy, Sartoris Snopes, and his tyrannical father, Abner Snopes. Abner, patriarch of his family, is discontented with the sharecropping system he is trapped in, and is accused of damaging the property of every place he farms and moving farms frequently to avoid punishment. The story explores the conflict of the young boy Sartoris, nicknamed Sarty, as he contemplates if he should continue to follow the lawless path his father has conditioned him into.

== Plot ==
"Barn Burning", set around 30 years after the Civil War, opens in a country drug store, which doubles as a Justice of the Peace's court. Abner Snopes is accused of burning down a barn, and his son Sarty is called up to testify against his father. Sarty is fully aware that his father committed the crime of which he is accused, and knows that his father wants and expects him to lie. The Justice ends dismissing the case without hearing Sarty's testimony, but tells Abner leave the county and never come back. As Sarty leaves the courthouse, he is insulted and assaulted by another child. Sarty tries to attack the child to defend his father's honor, but Abner holds him back. Sarty, his older brother, and Abner get into the family wagon, where his mother, named Lennie, aunt, and two sisters are waiting along with their broken possessions and they set off to the new place they will farm as sharecroppers. On the wagon, Sarty hopes to himself that Abner is finally satisfied with the last barn burnt and will not continue damaging property. That night, Abner wakes up Sarty and accuses him of being on the verge of betraying him in court, beats him "without heat", and them tells him that he should learn to be loyal to his family.

The next day the Snopes family arrives at the new place they will be farming. Directly after arriving, Abner takes Sarty to see the owner of the farm. Seeing the mansion of their landowners, the de Spains, Sarty is overcome with a sense of "peace and dignity" and he feels that it would be impossible for someone like his father to harm the people living in it. Sarty's hopes are, however, dashed when Abner enters the house, pushes past the Black servant who greets them, and tracks the excrement all over the white rug in the front room. Outside of the house, Abner comments that the mansion was built out of the labor of Blacks and laments that Whites, like him, now labor in the same way.

Later that day, Major de Spain has the rug dropped off at Abner's shack, ordering him to clean it. Abner obliges, but he uses harsh lye and intentionally damages the rug with a stone, despite the protests of his wife. Upon the rug's return, de Spain berates Abner for ruining the rug, and demands twenty bushels of corn for the damage. When he leaves, Sarty tells Abner that they should not give de Spain any corn at all. That Saturday, the family goes into town where Abner intends to sue de Spain for the twenty bushels of corn he was ordered to pay by him. In court, Sarty tries to defend his father's character, but in the end the Justice there still orders Abner to pay ten bushels of corn to de Spain. That night, Sarty hears the cries of his mother and realizes that Abner is trying to burn the de Spain barn. Abner orders Sarty to get a can of oil, which he does. Sarty then immediately tries to run away, to which Abner orders his wife to restrain Sarty, which she does reluctantly. Sarty breaks free and runs to the de Spain house. He warns an unidentified White man that Abner is about to burn the barn, and then continues running. Further away, Sarty hears three gunshots and he mourns for his father, whom he seems to assume is dead. The story ends with Sarty continuing to flee.

== Development, publication and reception ==
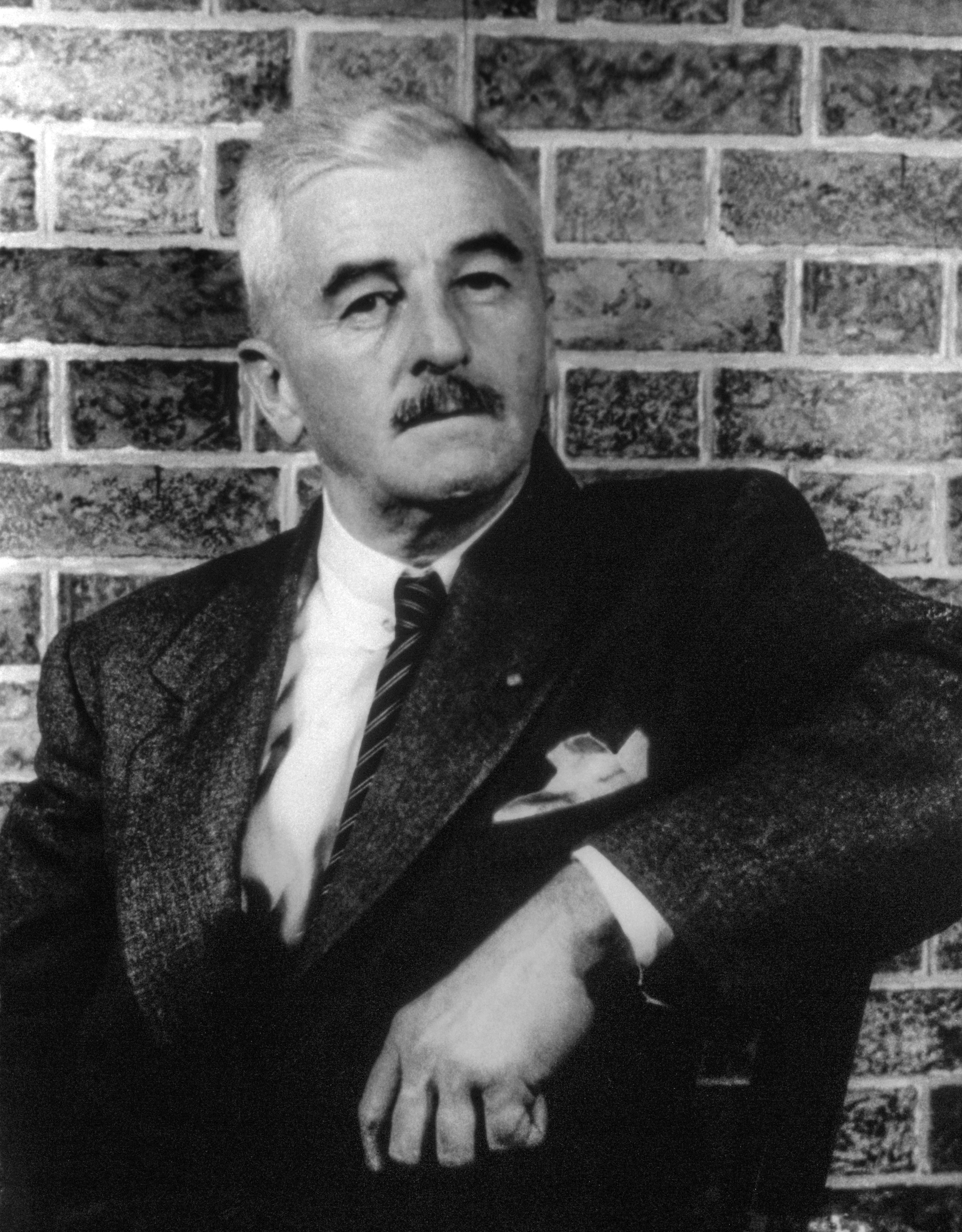
The author, William Faulkner, in 1954

"Barn Burning" was originally written as the first chapter of Faulkner's 1940 novel The Hamlet, appearing in the original manuscript and typescript of the novel. Although the story narratively precedes the Faulkner's Snopes trilogy, of which The Hamlet is the first book, the characterizations of Abner ("Ab" in The Hamlet) are different in the trilogy and the story. According to markings in the original manuscript, the story was written in approximately ten days. Faulkner ended up removing the story from the book and it was instead first published in the June 1939 issue of Harper's Magazine. The story was given the O. Henry Award for best short story of 1939.

The story has since been frequently anthologized. It was reprinted in A Rose for Emily and Other Stories, Collected Stories of William Faulkner, The Faulkner Reader, and Selected Short Stories of William Faulkner. The story is commonly taught in American high school and college English classes, and has been reprinted in classroom textbook short story anthologies, such as the Norton Anthology of Short Fiction.

Writing in 1999, Hans H. Skei called the story "a masterpiece". Skei particularly praised its effective use of narration in comparison some of Faulkner's other stories which explore similar coming of age themes, like "That Evening Sun" and "Uncle Willy". Literary scholar Hal McDonald has criticized the story for inaccurately depicting Southern speech.

== Themes and analysis ==
=== Family and heredity ===
Family influence and heredity are central themes in "Barn Burning". The familial tie between Sarty and his father Abner is a central issue and source of conflict in the story. Constantly Sarty contemplates if he should continue following the path of his father, which Abner would claim he should follow because of his "blood" ties. Sarty hopes that the result of the opening court case and the move to the de Spain farm will reform his father. However, when Abner continues his quest of rebellion by damaging the de Spains' carpet, Sarty nevertheless chooses to take Abner's side. Following the ensuing court case which is found in de Spain's favor, Sarty says to Abner, "You done [sic] the best you could! [. . .] If he wanted hit done different why didn’t he wait and tell you how? He won’t git no twenty bushels! He won’t git none! We’ll gether hit and hide hit! I kin watch . . ." In this way Sarty feels that Abner's actions are wrong because of the negative impact they have on the family, but still follows Abner because of their blood relationship. Sarty in the end decides to go against his father, reports his barn burning, and runs away from the family.

Scholars have debated the thematic implications of Sarty's actions towards his family. Virginia C. Fowler interprets Sarty as against Abner for the whole story, only taking his side in the de Spain conflict to mitigate the possibility of him burning a barn in the future. Alternately, Phyllis Franklin argues that only reporting of Abner does Sarty fully reject the arbitrary "pull of blood" that Abner exerts on Sarty. Franklin further claims that by turning away from Abner, Sarty embraces his humanity and individual freedom. Conversely, Jane Hiles reads the story as a grand irony, arguing that Sarty's rebellion against Abner is simply a repetition of the rebellion that Abner has been perpetrating against the sharecropping system.

=== Class conflict and justice ===
Differing conceptions of justice are a central idea in the story. The conflict between Abner and de Spain is reflective of a critique of the South in line with the Southern Gothic genre. Abner, depicted as a figure of gothic horror, believes the entire system of sharecropping to be unjust, and rebels by turning to property damage and violence. De Spain, who is implied to be richest plantation owner the family has worked for, essentially functions as a representation of the Southern aristocracy in the story. De Spain, for his part, attempts to achieve justice by demanding Abner pays him for property damage—a condition which they fight in court. As such, Faulkner presents conflicting interpretations of justice and class that were prominent in the Postbellum South, interpreted through the narrative lens of a child.

Faulkner also presents clashing views of property and class in the Postbellum South. When Abner takes Sarty to the de Spain mansion the reader is presented with differing interpretations of the de Spains' wealth, neither of which, as Hans H. Skei notes, seem superficially correct to the reader: on the one hand, Sarty sees the mansion and feels a sense of dignity and peace. On the other, Abner correctly identifies the unjust racial inequities which are the source of the mansions beauty, but can only interpret those inequities through his own racist lens. Skei also comments that the idea of property in the book is present from the outset—the title "Barn Burning" is an invocation of the land holding of a barn. As such, Faulkner centralizes the notion of class and its implications within the story.

=== Narrative style ===
"Barn Burning" is narrated from a third-person omniscient perspective. However, the narrator frequently provides commentary and internal monologues that exist outside of the objective events of the story. For example, the narrator assumes that the "pull of blood" of family ties objectively exists in the real world and literally effects the characters. Similarly, in the opening of the story, the narration quickly shifts from tangible descriptions of a store turned courthouse to internal and abstracted descriptions of Sarty's hunger, and finally to the internal thoughts of Sarty about the trial.

== Adaptations ==
In 1954, Gore Vidal adapted "Barn Burning" into an episode of the same name for the CBS anthology series Suspense, starring E. G. Marshall.

In 1958, Martin Ritt directed a film titled The Long, Hot Summer featuring actor Paul Newman. This film was based on three of Faulkner's works including "Barn Burning." In 1985, a made-for-television remake of The Long, Hot Summer aired on NBC, starring Don Johnson.

In 1980, the story was adapted into a PBS short film of the same name by director Peter Werner. It starred Tommy Lee Jones as Abner Snopes, Shawn Whittington as Sartoris Snopes, and Faulkner's nephew as de Spain.

The 1995 Malaysian adaptation titled The Arsonist (Malay: Kaki Bakar) was made by director U-Wei Haji Saari. The Snopes family being post-Civil War farmers are instead rewritten as Javanese immigrants who had just moved into a new rubber plantation.

The 2018 South Korean film Burning performs a stylistic adaptation merging elements of the Faulkner story with the Haruki Murakami story of the same name.
