= First-person narrative =

Story told from a narrator's point of view

A first-person narrative (also known as a first-person perspective, voice, point of view, etc.) is a mode of storytelling in which a storyteller recounts events from that storyteller's own personal point of view, using first-person grammar such as "I", "me", "my", and "myself" (also, in plural form, "we", "us", etc.). It must be narrated by a first-person character, such as a protagonist (or other focal character), re-teller, witness, or peripheral character. Alternatively, in a visual storytelling medium (such as video, television, or film), the first-person perspective is a graphical perspective rendered through a character's visual field, so the camera is "seeing" out of a character's eyes.

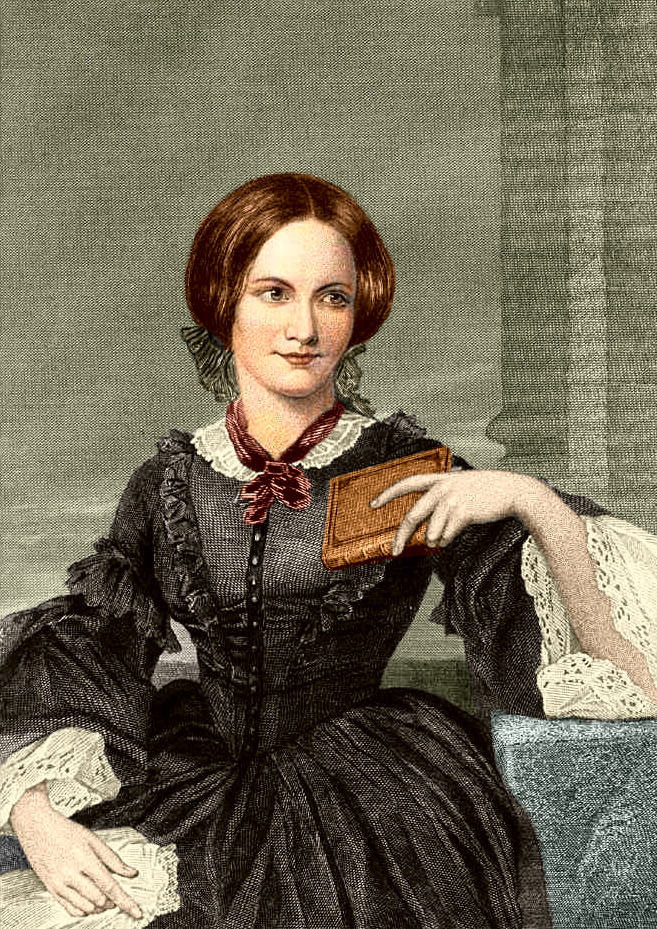
Charlotte Brontë, the author of Jane Eyre, which is known as "the classic example of first-person narrative"

A classic example of a first-person protagonist narrator is Charlotte Brontë's Jane Eyre (1847), in which the title character is telling the story in which she herself is also the protagonist: "I could not unlove him now, merely because I found that he had ceased to notice me". Srikanta by Bengali writer Sarat Chandra Chattopadhyay is another first-person perspective novel which is often called a "masterpiece". Srikanta, the title character and protagonist of the novel, tells his own story: "What memories and thoughts crowd into my mind, as, at the threshold of the afternoon of my wandering life, I sit down to write the story of its morning hours!"

This device allows the audience to see the narrator's mind's eye view of the fictional universe, but it is limited to the narrator's experiences and awareness of the true state of affairs. In some stories, first-person narrators may relay dialogue with other characters or refer to information they heard from the other characters, in order to try to deliver a larger point of view. Other stories may switch the narrator to different characters to introduce a broader perspective. An unreliable narrator is one that has completely lost credibility due to ignorance, poor insight, personal biases, mistakes, dishonesty, etc., which challenges the reader's initial assumptions.

== Point of view device ==
An example of the telling of a story in the grammatical first person, i.e. from the perspective of "I", is Herman Melville's Moby-Dick, which begins with "Call me Ishmael."

First-person narration may sometimes include an embedded or implied audience of one or more people. The story may be told by a person directly undergoing the events in the story without being aware of conveying that experience to readers; alternatively, the narrator may be conscious of telling the story to a given audience, perhaps at a given place and time, for a given reason.

=== Identity ===
A story written in the first person is most often told by the main character, but may also be told from the perspective of a less important character as they witness events, or a person retelling a story they were told by someone else.

=== Reliability ===
First-person narration presents the narrative through the perspective of a particular character. The reader or audience sees the story through the narrator's views and knowledge only. The narrator is an imperfect witness by definition, because they do not have a complete overview of events. Furthermore, they may be pursuing some hidden agenda (an "unreliable narrator").

Character weaknesses and faults, such as tardiness, cowardice, or vice, may leave the narrator unintentionally absent or unreliable for certain key events. Specific events may further be colored or obscured by a narrator's background since non-omniscient characters must by definition be laypersons and foreigners to some circles, and limitations such as poor eyesight and illiteracy may also leave important blanks. Another consideration is how much time has elapsed between when the character experienced the events of the story and when they decided to tell them. If only a few days have passed, the story could be related very differently than if the character was reflecting on events of the distant past. The character's motivation is also relevant. Are they just trying to clear up events for their own peace of mind? Make a confession about a wrong they did? Or tell a good adventure tale to their beer-guzzling friends? The reason why a story is told will also affect how it is written. Why is this narrator telling the story in this way, why now, and are they to be trusted? Unstable or malevolent narrators can also lie to the reader. Unreliable narrators are not uncommon.

In the first-person-plural point of view, narrators tell the story using "we". That is, no individual speaker is identified; the narrator is a member of a group that acts as a unit. The first-person-plural point of view occurs rarely but can be used effectively, sometimes as a means to increase the concentration on the character or characters the story is about. Examples include:

- William Faulkner's short story "A Rose for Emily" (Faulkner was an avid experimenter in using unusual points of view; see also his Spotted Horses, told in third-person plural).
- Frank B. Gilbreth and Ernestine Gilbreth Carey's memoir Cheaper by the Dozen.
- Theodore Sturgeon's short story "Crate".
- Frederik Pohl's Man Plus.
- Jeffrey Eugenides's The Virgin Suicides.
- Karen Joy Fowler's The Jane Austen Book Club.
- Joshua Ferris's Then We Came to the End.
- Heidi Vornbrock Roosa's Our Mother Who Art.

Other examples include Twenty-Six Men and a Girl by Maxim Gorky, The Treatment of Bibi Haldar by Jhumpa Lahiri, During the Reign of the Queen of Persia by Joan Chase, Our Kind by Kate Walbert, I, Robot by Isaac Asimov, and We Didn't by Stuart Dybek.

First-person narrators can also be multiple, as in Ryūnosuke Akutagawa's In a Grove (the source for the movie Rashomon) and Faulkner's novel The Sound and the Fury. Each of these sources provides different accounts of the same event, from the point of view of various first-person narrators.

There can also be multiple co-principal characters as narrator, such as in Robert A. Heinlein's The Number of the Beast. The first chapter introduces four characters, including the initial narrator, who is named at the beginning of the chapter. The narrative continues in subsequent chapters with a different character explicitly identified as the narrator for that chapter. Other characters later introduced in the book also have their "own" chapters where they narrate the story for that chapter. The story proceeds in a linear fashion, and no event occurs more than once, i.e. no two narrators speak "live" about the same event.

The first-person narrator may be the principal character (e.g., Gulliver in Gulliver's Travels), someone very close to them who is privy to their thoughts and actions (Dr. Watson in Sherlock Holmes stories) or one who closely observes the principal character (such as Nick Carraway in The Great Gatsby). These can be distinguished as "first-person major" or "first-person minor" points of view.

Narrators can report others' narratives at one or more removes. These are called "frame narrators": examples are Mr. Lockwood, the narrator in Wuthering Heights by Emily Brontë; and the unnamed narrator in Heart of Darkness by Joseph Conrad. Skilled writers choose to skew narratives, in keeping with the narrator's character, to an arbitrary degree, from ever so slight to extreme. For example, the aforementioned Mr. Lockwood is quite naive, of which fact he appears unaware, simultaneously rather pompous, and recounting a combination of stories, experiences, and servants' gossip. As such, his character is an unintentionally very unreliable narrator and serves mainly to mystify, confuse, and ultimately leave the events of Wuthering Heights open to a great range of interpretations.

A rare form of the first person is the first-person omniscient, in which the narrator is a character in the story, but also knows the thoughts and feelings of all the other characters. It can seem like third-person omniscient at times. A reasonable explanation fitting the mechanics of the story's world is generally provided or implied unless its glaring absence is a major plot point. Three notable examples are The Book Thief by Markus Zusak, where the narrator is Death, From the Mixed-Up Files of Mrs. Basil E. Frankweiler, where the narrator is the titular character but is describing the story of the main characters, and The Lovely Bones by Alice Sebold, where a young girl, having been killed, observes, from some post-mortem, extracorporeal viewpoint, her family's struggle to cope with her disappearance. Typically, however, the narrator restricts the events relayed in the narrative to those that could reasonably be known.

== Autobiography ==
In autobiographical fiction, the first-person narrator is the character of the author (with varying degrees of historical accuracy). The narrator is still distinct from the author and must behave like any other character and any other first-person narrator. Examples of this kind of narrator include Jim Carroll in The Basketball Diaries and Kurt Vonnegut, Jr. in Timequake (in this case, the first-person narrator is also the author). In some cases, the narrator is writing a book—"the book in your hands"—and therefore he has most of the powers and knowledge of the author. Examples include The Name of the Rose by Umberto Eco, and The Curious Incident of the Dog in the Night-Time by Mark Haddon. Another example is a fictional "Autobiography of James T. Kirk" which was "Edited" by David A. Goodman who was the actual writer of that book and playing the part of James Kirk (Gene Roddenberry's Star Trek) as he wrote the novel.

== Detective fiction ==
Since the narrator is within the story, he or she may not have knowledge of all the events. For this reason, the first-person narrative is often used for detective fiction, so that the reader and narrator uncover the case together. One traditional approach in this form of fiction is for the main detective principal assistant, the "Watson", to be the narrator: this derives from the character of Dr. Watson in Sir Arthur Conan Doyle's Sherlock Holmes stories.

== Forms ==
First-person narratives can appear in several forms; interior monologue, as in Fyodor Dostoevsky's Notes from Underground; dramatic monologue, also in Albert Camus' The Fall; or explicitly, as Mark Twain's Adventures of Huckleberry Finn.

Other forms include temporary first-person narration as a story within a story, wherein a narrator or character observing the telling of a story by another is reproduced in full, temporarily, and without interruption shifting narration to the speaker. The first-person narrator can also be the focal character.

== Styles ==
With a first-person narrative it is important to consider how the story is being told, i.e., is the character writing it down, telling it out loud, thinking it to themselves? And if they are writing it down, is it something meant to be read by the public, a private diary, or a story meant for one other person? The way the first-person narrator is relating the story will affect the language used, the length of sentences, the tone of voice, and many other things. A story presented as a secret diary could be interpreted much differently than a public statement.

First-person narratives can tend towards a stream of consciousness and interior monologue, as in Marcel Proust's In Search of Lost Time. The whole of the narrative can itself be presented as a false document, such as a diary, in which the narrator makes explicit reference to the fact that he or she is writing or telling a story. This is the case in Bram Stoker's Dracula. As a story unfolds, narrators may be aware that they are telling a story and of their reasons for telling it. The audience that they believe they are addressing can vary. In some cases, a frame story presents the narrator as a character in an outside story who begins to tell their own story, as in Mary Shelley's Frankenstein.

First-person narrators are often unreliable narrators since a narrator might be impaired (such as both Quentin and Benjy in Faulkner's The Sound and the Fury), lie (as in The Quiet American by Graham Greene, or The Book of the New Sun series by Gene Wolfe), or manipulate their own memories intentionally or not (as in The Remains of the Day by Kazuo Ishiguro, or in Ken Kesey's One Flew Over the Cuckoo's Nest). Henry James discusses his concerns about "the romantic privilege of the 'first person'" in his preface to The Ambassadors, calling it "the darkest abyss of romance."

One example of a multi-level narrative structure is Joseph Conrad's novella Heart of Darkness, which has a double framework: an unidentified "I" (first person singular) narrator relates a boating trip during which another character, Marlow, uses the first person to tell a story that comprises the majority of the work. Within this nested story, it is mentioned that another character, Kurtz, told Marlow a lengthy story; however, its content is not revealed to readers. Thus, there is an "I" narrator introducing a storyteller as "he" (Marlow), who talks about himself as "I" and introduces another storyteller as "he" (Kurtz), who in turn presumably told his story from the perspective of "I".

== Films ==
First-person narration is more difficult to achieve in film; however, voice-over narration can create the same structure.

An example of first-person narration in a film would be the narration given by the character Greg Heffley in the film adaptation of the popular book series Diary of a Wimpy Kid.

== See also ==
- Narration
- Vertiginous question
