= Spotted Horses =

1931 novella by William Faulkner

"Spotted Horses" is a novella written by William Faulkner and originally published in Scribner's magazine in June 1931 and republished in 1979 as part of the Uncollected Stories of William Faulkner. It includes the character Flem Snopes, who appears in much of Faulkner's work, and tells in ambiguous terms of his backhand profiteering with an honest Texan selling untamed ponies. "Spotted Horses" was later incorporated into The Hamlet (the first book of the Snopes trilogy) under the title "The Peasants: Chapter One" (in book four of the novel).

It features Vladimir Kyrlytch Ratliff who appears in other Faulkner short stories and is a prominent character in The Hamlet, The Town and The Mansion.

A descendant of these horses is purchased by Jewel, the illegitimate middle son of Addie Bundren, in the novel As I Lay Dying (1930).
