= Gavin Stevens (character) =

Gavin Stevens is a lawyer and the county attorney in Jefferson in Faulkner's fictional Yoknapatawpha County, Mississippi. He was educated at Harvard (Phi Beta Kappa) and Heidelberg universities.

He is shrewd, observant and tolerant of the quirks and foibles of his fellow Southerners. He takes part in the detection and prevention of crime in the county community, and in handling the human passions released by violence in the community.

The stories are mostly narrated by his nephew Charles (Chick) Mallison, who calls him Uncle Gavin. His best friend is Vladimir Kyrilytch "V. K." Ratliff (a.k.a. Suratt).

He is described as heroic, idealistic, tireless, and meddlesome. He finally marries the Widow Harris, the sweetheart of his youth.

Gowan Stevens is related; he is described as Gavin's cousin in The Town and Gavin's nephew in Requiem for a Nun.

== Novels with Gavin Stevens ==
- Sanctuary (1931)
- Light in August (1932)
- Go Down, Moses (1942)
- Intruder in the Dust (1948)
- Requiem for a Nun (1951)
- The Town (1957) in which he narrates Chapters 2,5,8,13,15,17,20,22
- The Mansion (novel) (1959)

== Short stories with Gavin Stevens ==
All the stories listed here were included in the volume Knight's Gambit (1949):

- Smoke (1932)
- Monk (1937)
- Hand Upon the Waters (1939)
- Tomorrow (1940)
- An Error in Chemistry (1946)
- Knight's Gambit (1949)

== Film adaptations with Gavin Stevens ==
The character appears in Intruder in the Dust, the film. David Brian plays the character.

In the 1961 film Sanctuary, adapted from the original novel and its sequel, he is known as Ira Bobbitt and is played by Harry Townes. Gene Phillips of Loyola University of Chicago wrote that the name was likely altered to avoid confusion with Gowan.
