= Intruder in the Dust (film) =

1949 film by Clarence Brown

- DVD cover
- Directed by: Clarence Brown
- Screenplay by: Ben Maddow
- Based on: Intruder in the Dust; 1948 novel by William Faulkner
- Produced by: Clarence Brown
- Starring: David Brian; Claude Jarman Jr. Juano Hernández
- Cinematography: Robert Surtees
- Edited by: Robert Kern
- Music by: Adolph Deutsch
- Distributed by: Metro-Goldwyn-Mayer
- Release date: October 10, 1949 (United States)
- Running time: 87 minutes
- Country: United States
- Language: English
- Budget: $988,000
- Box office: $837,000

Intruder in the Dust is a 1949 American Southern Gothic film noir directed by Clarence Brown and written by Ben Maddow, who adapted his screenplay from the 1948 William Faulkner novel of the same name. It stars David Brian, Claude Jarman Jr. and Juano Hernandez.

The film was shot on location in Faulkner's hometown of Oxford, Mississippi.

== Plot ==
In a small town, Lucas Beauchamp, a Black man, is arrested for the murder of Vinson Gowrie, a White lumberman. As he is sent to the jail house, Lucas turns to Chick Mallison in the crowd, and asks for his uncle John Gavin Stevens to be his attorney. Chick returns home and at the dinner table, Chick is asked by his uncle why he was at the jail house.

Troubled by Lucas's arrest, Chick runs to his bedroom and tells a story to his uncle. On a cold November day, as he was hunting rabbits with his black friend Aleck, Chick nearly drowned in a frozen creek, but Lucas saved him. Inside his home, Lucas feeds Chick and dresses him in dry clothes. In gratitude, Chick wants to repay Lucas but Lucas will not accept his money.

Chick also remembers another incident at a country store where Vinson attempts to strike Lucas, but he is restrained by several men. Chick concludes his story, believing Lucas considers him to be his friend. John reluctantly decides to represent Lucas, and he and Chick visit Lucas inside his jail cell. There, Lucas recalls before the murder, Vinson and his partner were stealing another man's lumber though he refuses to finish the story. John leaves, but Chick returns to the jail cell. Lucas suggests to exhume Vinson's body and inspect that the bullet was not fired from his pistol. However, John opposes the suggestion.

Miss Eunice Habersham, an elderly woman, believes in Lucas's presumed innocence. She drives Chick and Aleck to Vinson's gravesite near a chapel, where they discover the body has been moved. Based on the discovery, John and Sheriff Hampton are convinced that Lucas is innocent. When they return to the gravesite, Vinson's father Nub is also there. Chick notices a nearby trail of footprints, which leads to Vinson's corpse being retrieved from the quicksand. It is then determined that the bullet that killed Vinson was not fired from Lucas's pistol.

Back in town, a mob of white men, led by Vinson's brother Crawford, arrive at the jail house and demand for Lucas to be hanged. John and Chick return to Lucas's jail cell where Lucas confesses he knows the identity of Vinson's partner and was present when Vinson was shot, but he could not identify the assailant. Sheriff Hampton frees Lucas in hopes it will lure the real killer to retaliate. The plan succeeds and Crawford is arrested. The mob then disperses when Crawford is taken to the jail house.

The next morning, Lucas pays John for his legal expenses and walks away a free man, as John and Chick look on.

== Cast ==
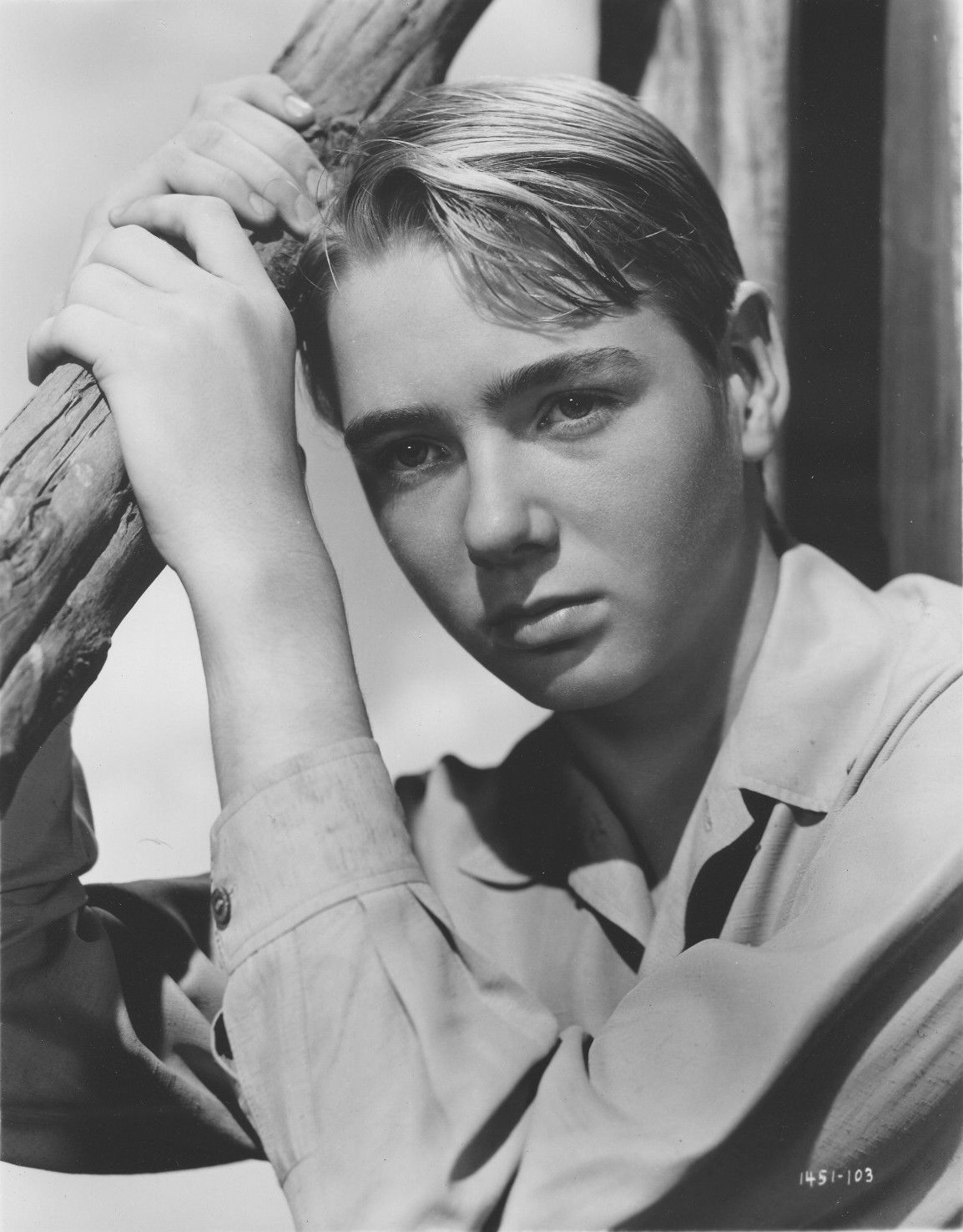
Claude Jarman Jr. in Intruder in the Dust

- David Brian as John Gavin Stevens
- Claude Jarman Jr. as Chick Mallison
- Juano Hernandez as Lucas Beauchamp
- Porter Hall as Nub Gowrie
- Elizabeth Patterson as Miss Eunice Habersham
- Will Geer as Sheriff Hampton
- Charles Kemper as Crawford Gowrie
- David Clarke as Vinson Gowrie
- Elzie Emanuel as Aleck
- Lela Bliss as Mrs. Mallison
- Harry Hayden as Mr. Mallison
- Harry Antrim as Mr. Tubbs, prison warder
- Dan White as Will Legate, jailhouse guard
- Gene Roper as son of country store owner

== Production ==
Clarence Brown, who had been born in Massachusetts but was raised in Tennessee, wanted to adapt Faulker's novel into a film when it was published in 1948. Brown, who had directed multiple films for Metro-Goldwyn-Mayer (MGM) for over two decades, asked studio head Louis B. Mayer about doing a film adaptation, but Mayer had his doubts over whether it would be commercially successful. Dore Schary, who was hired as MGM's new vice president of production, supported Brown, and allowed the project to go into production. Brown insisted on filming on location in Oxford, Mississippi, where Faulkner had lived for most of his life.

== Reception ==
=== Box office ===
According to MGM records, Intruder in the Dust earned $643,000 in the U.S. and Canada and $194,000 elsewhere, for a worldwide box office of $837,000.

=== Critical reaction ===
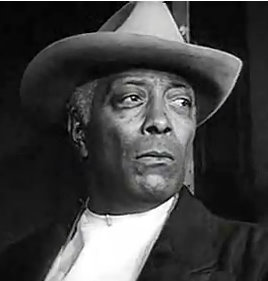
Juano Hernandez in Intruder in the Dust

Bosley Crowther of The New York Times wrote Intruder in the Dust was "one of the great cinema dramas of our times. For here, at last, is a picture that slashes right down to the core of the complex of racial resentments and social divisions in the South—which cosmically mocks the hollow pretense of 'white supremacy'—and does it in terms of visual action and realistic drama at its best." Crowther later listed the film as one of the top ten best of 1949.

Harrison's Reports wrote the film was "[a] powerful melodrama". It also acknowledged the film "is not a pleasant entertainment, but it holds one fascinated throughout because of the superb handling of the theme by producer-director Clarence Brown, and the fine acting by the entire cast." William Brogdon of Variety was less enthusiastic, in which he wrote the film was "essentially a murder-mystery melodrama" that is "threaded with the racial and lynch problems of the [South] but touches the pros and cons of the subject only lightly."

In 1958, William Faulkner told The New York Times: "I'm not much of a moviegoer, but I did see that one. I thought it was a fine job. That Juano Hernandez is a fine actor—and man, too." Ralph Ellison once called Intruder in the Dust the only film of its era "that could be shown in Harlem without arousing unintended laughter." More than 50 years later, in 2001, film historian Donald Bogle wrote that Intruder in the Dust broke new ground in the cinematic portrayal of blacks, and Hernandez's "performance and extraordinary presence still rank above that of almost any other black actor to appear in an American movie."

On the review aggregator website Rotten Tomatoes, 93% of 44 critics' reviews are positive.

=== Accolades ===
In 1950, David Brian and Juano Hernandez were respectively nominated for Best Supporting Actor and Most Promising Newcomer – Male at the 7th Golden Globe Awards.
