= Knight's Gambit =

1949 short story collection by William Faulkner

Knight’s Gambit is a 1949 short story collection by American author William Faulkner. Including the titular story, the book collects six of Faulkner’s stories about attorney Gavin Stevens, who also takes a leading part in his novel Intruder in the Dust (1948).

Gavin Stevens is the county attorney in Jefferson in Faulkner’s fictional Yoknapatawpha County, Mississippi.

Stevens is shrewd, observant and tolerant of the quirks and foibles of his fellow Southerners. He takes part in the detection and prevention of crime in the county community, and in handling the human passions released by violence in the community. The stories are narrated by his nephew, who calls him Uncle Gavin. He finally marries the Widow Harriss, the sweetheart of his youth.

The first five stories were published in various magazines; the six stories published together in 1949 can be regarded as a novel.

"Tomorrow" was adapted into a film of the same name in 1972 starring Robert Duvall.

== List of stories ==
- "Smoke" (1932) (Harper’s, April 1932; also in Dr Martino)
- "Monk" (1937) (Scribner’s, May 1937)
- "Hand Upon the Waters" (1939) (Saturday Evening Post, November 4, 1939)
- "Tomorrow" (1940) (Saturday Evening Post, November 23, 1940)
- "An Error in Chemistry" (1946) (Ellery Queen’s Mystery Magazine, June 1946)
- "Knight’s Gambit" (1949)
