= The Hamlet =

William Faulkner's first part of the Snopes trilogy

- First edition cover
- Author: William Faulkner
- Cover artist: George Salter
- Language: English
- Series: Snopes trilogy
- Genre: Fiction
- Publisher: Random House
- Publication date: 1940
- Publication place: United States
- Media type: Print (hardback and paperback)
- Pages: 421 pp
- OCLC: 409724
- Preceded by: If I Forget Thee, Jerusalem
- Followed by: Go Down, Moses

The Hamlet is a novel by the American author William Faulkner, published in 1940, about the fictional Snopes family of Mississippi. Originally a standalone novel, it was later followed by The Town (1957) and The Mansion (1959), forming the Snopes trilogy.

== Composition ==
The novel incorporates revised versions of the previously published short stories "Spotted Horses" (1931, Book Four's Chapter One), "The Hound" (1931, Book Three's Chapter Two), "Lizards in Jamshyd's Courtyard" (1932, Book One's Chapter Three and Book Four's Chapter Two), and "Fool About a Horse" (1936, Book One's Chapter Two). It also makes use of material from "Father Abraham" (abandoned 1927, pub. 1984, Book Four's Chapter One), "Afternoon of a Cow" (1937, pub. 1943, Book Three's Chapter Two), and "Barn Burning" (1939, Book One's Chapter One).

== Plot summary ==
The novel follows the exploits of the Snopes family, beginning with Ab Snopes, who is introduced more fully in Faulkner's The Unvanquished. Most of the book centers on Frenchman's Bend, into which the heirs of Ab and his family have migrated from parts unknown. In the beginning of the book, Ab, his wife, daughter, and son Flem settle down as tenant farmers beholden to the powerful Varner family.

As the book progresses, the Snopeses move from being poor outcasts to a very controversial, if not dangerous, element in the life of the town. In contrast, V.K. Ratliff stands as the moral hero of the novel. Faulkner uses the eccentricities of the Snopeses to great comic effect, most notably in his description of Ike Snopes and his carnal inclinations toward a cow.

=== Book One: "Flem" ===
==== Chapter One ====
===== Part 1 (which is the only part) =====
Frenchman's Bend/The Old Frenchman Place introduced: lawlessness; socioeconomic background of settlers. Will Varner, Jody Varner introduced. Ab Snopes rents a place from Jody; is discovered via gossip to be an alleged barn-burner. First glimpse of Eula (p. 11). Jody plans to force Ab out after getting work out of him. Ab is discovered to be mixed up in a second incident of barn-burning, over a dispute with De Spain over his wife's expensive French carpet. Jody agrees to take on Flem as a clerk in the Varner store to keep Ab happy.

==== Chapter Two ====
===== Part 1 =====
Ratliff is introduced; he claims he knew Ab a long time ago.

===== Part 2 =====
Ratliff discusses Ab's past, before he was "soured". Ab trades horses with Pat Stamper. Ab's motive is to recover the eight Yoknapatawpha County dollars that Stamper had acquired from Beasly. Ab picks up his wife's milk separator; trades Pat Stamper several teams, and comes out much the worse.

===== Part 3 =====
Ratliff takes Ab a bottle of McCallum's whiskey.

==== Chapter Three ====
===== Part 1 =====
Flem settles into clerking at Varner's store. Ratliff is established as a gossipmonger, a speculative capitalist, a traveler. Flem disrupts the normal business practices of the Varner store by insisting on payment up front and always calculating the bill correctly. Flem has a bow tie (64). Flem quickly establishes himself as upwardly mobile. Flem establishes a cow-trading sideline; I.O. and Eck Snopes appear on the Frenchman's Bend scene. The old blacksmith, Trumbull, is forced out. Jody wonders how much he'll have to pay in order to keep himself safe from the rumor of Ab's barn-burning.

===== Part 2 =====
Ratliff is recovering from an operation; catches up on local gossip. Flem is making usurious loans to Negroes; I.O. is to be the new schoolteacher. Mink Snopes appears for the first time; he trades a note bearing the name "Ike Snopes" for a sewing machine. Ratliff tells the story of the goat-scarcity caused by the Northerner's goat-ranching plans. Ike Snopes turns out to be an idiot; Flem redeems his note; Mrs. Littlejohn watches after Ike, as she can communicate with him somehow.

===== Part 3 =====
Flem "passes" Jody Varner at the store; apparently, he means to pass Will Varner, as well.

=== Book Two: "Eula" ===
==== Chapter One ====
===== Part 1 (which is the only part) =====
Eula's childhood described; she is the last of 16 children and is immediately established as a symbolic-mythological figure who has a privileged childhood. Refuses to walk or otherwise take action. Insofar as this is problematic for her parents, the solution is immediately seen in inserting her into the economy of marriage. She is supra-feminine, immediately noticeable when she is in public. Labove's recruitment as schoolmaster is described. Labove is the first person described as caught within Eula's orbit, even though she is only 11. Labove is drawn back to teaching at the Frenchman's Bend school even after he receives his university degree. Labove tries to assault Eula (133); Eula is unafraid. Labove worries about retribution until he realizes that Eula does not even see the event as important enough to complain to her older brother.

==== Chapter Two ====
===== Part 1 =====
Eula, now 14, is the center of teenage masculine attention in Frenchman's Bend; and though she is assaulted by proxy (resulting in attention paid to other girls in her social circle) none of the boys manages to gain access to her. Flem becomes closely acquainted with the Varner family. The background of Hoake McCarron is given. McCarron courts Eula. McCarron/Eula fight off a group of local boys determined to keep McCarron from deflowering Eula. McCarron's arm is broken; set by Varner; Eula then arranges to be deflowered by him. Eula turns out to be pregnant; Jody is furious but Will is unsurprised. The suitors flee Yoknapatawpha County. Flem reappears and is married to Eula, so that her illegitimate child can have a name; he receives (a) money; (b) the old Frenchman place; (c) Eula's hand.

===== Part 2 =====
The history of Eula's relationship to Flem before marriage is recapped. Ratliff's knowledge of Frenchman's Bend is analyzed. Eula and Flem depart for a honeymoon in Texas. Ratliff's fantastic allegory of Flem's sale of his soul.

=== Book Three: "The Long Summer" ===
==== Chapter One ====
===== Part 1 =====
Varner tells Ratliff the story about Mink's attempt to retrieve his yearling. They wander down to Varner's store, where the verdict against Mink is discussed and the peep show in Mrs. Littlejohn's barn begins again. Ratliff's fantastic fable about Flem and the illiterate field hand.

===== Part 2 =====
Ike Snopes rises early and pursues Houston's cow; there are misadventures and he is chased off. Seeing fire in the direction of the cow, he becomes concerned and returns; he gets the cow out and travels with her, then is caught again by Houston, who curses him. When Houston leaves again, Ike abducts the cow and leaves. They travel together for several days, and Ike steals feed for the cow. They get rained on.

===== Part 3 =====
Houston comes home and finds the cow missing. At first he believes that he forgot to fasten the gate, but soon discovers that the cow has been led away. He gets his horse and waters it at Mrs. Littlejohn's house, The unnamed vicious farmer from whom Ike takes feed is described; he searches for Ike, the feed-thief; he captures the cow and Ike follows him home. Houston sells the cow to Mrs. Littlejohn; she purchases it with Ike's money. The establishment of the peep-show, presided over by Lump Snopes. Ratliff determines to stop the peep show; gets other Snopeses involved, as they are concerned for the Snopes name. Brother Whitfield, preacher, explains his plan to break Ike away from his perversion.

==== Chapter Two ====
===== Part 1 =====
Houston's backstory: Early childhood, later schooling; meeting his future wife, who pushes him through school, and from whom he flees; his flight to the Texas railyard and abduction from a whorehouse of a prostitute with whom he lives for seven years. Houston is drawn back to Yoknapatawpha County; he marries his wife, and they move into the house he has built for her; his stallion kills her. Houston kills the stallion. Mink kills Houston.

===== Part 2 =====
Mink kills Houston; he strikes his wife and she leaves him, taking the children. Mink attempts to cover up the evidence; he kills Houston's hound and hides the body. Mink doesn't run because he doesn't have any money. Cousin Lump doesn't believe he didn't check Houston's body for money, claiming that Houston was carrying at least $50. Mink's wife gives him money; Lump Snopes keeps him company and won't be shaken off, hoping to collect some of the money that Houston was carrying. Mink is arrested trying to recover the money from Houston's body, which he had placed in a hollow oak. Mink injures his neck trying to escape from a moving carriage after his arrest, but is treated and placed in jail.

===== Part 3 =====
Mink is in jail; his wife and children stay with Ratliff. She makes money by keeping house at a boardinghouse and by prostituting herself. Mink refuses bond and counsel. I.O. Snopes is revealed as a bigamist. Mink hangs his hopes on being saved by Flem.

=== Book Four: "The Peasants" ===
==== Chapter One ====
===== Part 1 =====
Flem Snopes comes back into town, along with a Texan and his wild ponies. The ponies are continually demonstrated to be vicious. Flem's superiority as a trader is acknowledged by Ratliff, who is himself no mean trader. The ponies are auctioned off, with the townspeople nervous at first but gradually led into trading when the Texan offers Eck Snopes a pony for free just to make a bid. Henry Armstid bids his wife's last five dollars on one of the spotted ponies. Flem accepts the money for the pony that Henry had (arguably) bought from the Texan. Flem swaps a carriage for the last three Texan ponies. The men who purchased ponies attempt to get their purchases, but the wild ponies break free. One of Eck's ponies breaks into Mrs. Littlejohn's house; she breaks a washboard over its head and calls it a "son of a bitch". Henry is badly injured when the horses break free. Tull is injured when the horses surprise his mules on a bridge. Ratliff and Varner speculate about fertility while watching the horses spread out over the county. Lump inadvertently admits the horses belonged to Flem (although no consequences seem to follow from this admission). The men in front of the Varner store discuss the Armstids' lack of luck. Flem refuses to refund Mrs. Armstid the money for the horse, despite the fact that the Texan had assured her that he would. St. Elmo Snopes steals candy from the Varner store.

===== Part 2 =====
The Armstids and Tulls sue the Snopeses over the matter of the ponies. Flem declines to appear. Lump perjures himself, claiming that Flem gave Mrs. Armstid's money to the Texan, and that therefore he was not responsible for refunding it to Mrs. Armstid. Eck is held blameless in the injuring of Vernon Tull because, technically, he never owned the horse that injured him. Mink Snopes is brought to trial for killing Jack Houston, but fails to participate in the trial itself; he declines even to enter a plea because he is waiting for Flem to solve his legal problems. When Flem fails to appear, Mink is convicted and sentenced to life in prison; he promises to kill Flem.

==== Chapter Two ====
===== Part 1 =====
Ratliff, Armstid, and Bookwright go out to the old Frenchman place at night and find Flem digging in the garden. Armstid is emphatic that his previously broken leg is fine now, and quite touchy about the subject. Speculation about what is out in the garden at the old Frenchman place: local legend has it that Confederate treasure was buried there when the Union army came through. They agree to get Uncle Dick Bolivar, a local diviner, out to the property the next night, after Flem has gone to sleep. Uncle Dick manages to locate three cloth bags with money buried in the earth; the three men confederate to purchase the property. Ratliff rides out to find Flem and purchases the old Frenchman place from him; Flem refuses to negotiate and the three men own the property; they move out to find the treasure and discover that it is a "salted gold mine" when they finally examine the dollars that inspired them to purchase the property in the first place (none were manufactured before the Civil War).

===== Part 2 =====
Flem and Eula depart for Jefferson. The men outside Varner's store speculate on Flem's next move; his "horse-trading" has become proverbial.

== Critical analysis ==
Margaret Dunn has discussed parallelisms and contrasts between The Hamlet and Go Down, Moses, the idea of "freedom," and how Flem imitates and builds upon the actions of Will Varner. Joseph Gold has noted the complicity of the Jefferson townspeople in the rise of Flem Snopes, by their passivity and the latent traits of Snopesism that lurk in the people in less extreme form. Paul Levine has discussed the recurring themes of love and money in the course of the trilogy. Richard Godden has examined economic and legal aspects of land ownership and disputes in The Hamlet.

Florence Leaver has examined the narrative structure of the novel in terms of the relation of the other characters to Flem, as opposed to study of standard linear narrative. Carey Wall has discussed the nature of The Hamlet as "a chain of episodes rather than a tightly woven plot." Owen Robinson has noted the contrast in the narrative style and tone between The Hamlet and The Town. Thomas H Rogers commented critically, in his contemporary review of The Town, in his comparison between the literary merits of The Hamlet and The Town, with The Hamlet emerging more favourably. Andrea Dimino has studied aspects of Faulkner's use of humour in the novel. Peter Nicolaisen has examined the contrast between the public and private lives of the characters as shown in the novel.

== Film adaptation ==
The movie The Long, Hot Summer (1958), starring Paul Newman and Joanne Woodward, is very loosely based on stories by William Faulkner, primarily The Hamlet. That film was remade as the television series of the same name.

== See also ==
- "Spotted Horses" an inspiration to Book 4 "The Peasants" in The Hamlet
- The Town
- The Mansion

Preceded by The Unvanquished	Novels set in Yoknapatawpha County	Succeeded by Go Down, Moses (book)
