= A Rose for Emily =

1930 short story by William Faulkner

- Short story by William Faulkner
- Country: United States
- Language: English
- Genre: Southern Gothic

Publication
- Published in: The Forum
- Publication type: Periodical
- Media type: Print (magazine)
- Publication date: April 1930
- Pages: 6

"A Rose for Emily" is a short story by American author William Faulkner, first published in the April 1930 issue of The Forum. It was Faulkner's first short story published in a national magazine.

== Plot summary ==
The story opens with an account of the funeral of Emily Grierson, an eccentric and reclusive Southern woman. Her funeral is a chance for many of the townspeople to engage their curiosity, since no one has entered her house but Tobe, a Black man serving as her gardener and cook, in ten years. In the story the following occurrences are described non-linearly.

The Grierson family, of the Antebellum South aristocracy, falls on hard times after the Civil War. Emily's father turns her suitors away because he does not consider them good enough for his daughter, so she is still single when he dies shortly before her 30th birthday. She refuses to give up his body for burial for three days, telling the townspeople who come to her house that he is not dead. For a while after her father's death, the only person seen about Emily's home is Tobe, who brings back groceries from the market.

It is learned that only the house was left to Emily after the death of her father; thus, she is left alone and poor. The townsfolk pity her and the mayor, Colonel Sartoris, makes a gentleman's agreement to overlook her taxes as an act of charity. To protect her pride, he tells her it is repayment for a loan given to the town by her father.

The next summer, construction workers arrive in the town to pave the sidewalks. Emily is soon regularly seen around town with Homer Barron, a laborer from the North. The townsfolk believe the relationship doomed because noblesse oblige would prevent Emily marrying Homer, and Homer "liked men, and it was known that he drank with the younger men in the Elks' Club" and is "not a marrying man". The relationship continues regardless, and the townspeople begin to consider it a disgrace. They persuade the Baptist minister to discuss the matter with Emily. The conversation goes poorly, and the minister's wife contacts Emily's estranged family in Alabama.

While two of her female cousins are staying, Emily buys arsenic from the town's druggist. She also purchases what appear to be wedding presents: a man's toilet set engraved with Homer's initials, and men's clothes. Homer disappears, which the townsfolk believe to be so that Emily can get rid of the cousins before the wedding. The cousins leave, and Homer returns three days later. He is let into the house by Tobe and is never seen again; the townspeople assume that he has deserted Emily.

Emily becomes reclusive again. A strong smell begins to emanate from the house, which the townspeople ascribe to Tobe failing to clean properly. Afraid of offending Emily, they send men to sprinkle lime around the property under the cover of darkness. The smell dissipates after a while.

Years later, a new generation is in charge of the town. Having no ties to Colonel Sartoris, they attempt to get Emily to pay taxes again. They visit her home, where she behaves coldly towards them and flatly denies owing any taxes. She insists on maintaining the informal arrangement and tells them to see Sartoris, though he has been dead for a decade. They leave and decline to press the issue. The people of the town come to view Emily as a "hereditary obligation" to be humored and tolerated.

Emily dies aged 74. After the funeral, Tobe lets a group of townsfolk into her house and leaves through the back, never to be seen again. The townsfolk find a locked bedroom upstairs. They force the door and find the decomposed corpse of Homer Barron lying on the bed, with the gifts Emily had bought for him arranged around the room. On the pillow next to Homer is the indentation of a head and a long strand of iron-gray hair.

== Characters ==
First appearance in The Forum, April, 1930.

Emily Grierson - The main character of the story. Her father kept her from seeing suitors and controlled her social life, keeping her in isolation until his death, when she is 30 years old. Her struggle with loss and attachment is the impetus for the plot, driving her to kill Homer Barron, the man assumed to have married her. She poisons and kills Homer as she sees this as the only way to keep Homer with her permanently. She treats him as her living husband even after his death, which is shown by her keeping his clothes in the room, keeping his engraved wedding items on the dresser, and the strand of her hair found beside his corpse at the end of the story that indicated she even slept beside him.

Homer Barron - Emily's romantic interest. He is found dead and decomposed in Emily's bedroom after her funeral. He initially enters the story as a foreman for a road construction project occurring in the town. He is soon seen to be with Emily in her Sunday carriage rides, and it is expected for them to be married. Homer differs from the rest of the town because he is a Northerner. It is unknown if Homer fully reciprocates the romantic feelings Emily has for him. It is stated in the story that Homer likes men and is "not a marrying man."

The Narrator - Unnamed. A presumed townsperson who watches the events of Emily's life unfold in their entirety. The narrator speaks in first-person plural, meaning that they refer to themselves as "we," or "us," seemingly in solidarity with the other townspeople. The story is presented to the reader in a non-chronological order. Some parts of the story are repeated, such as Homer's disappearance, the idea that Emily and Homer will get married, and Emily's refusal to pay taxes, indicating that the narrator is a voice for the town.

Colonel Sartoris - The former mayor who remitted Emily's taxes. While he is in the story very little, his decision to remit Emily's taxes leads to her refusal to pay them ever again, contributing to her stubborn personality. The reason for Sartoris remitting her taxes is never given, only that he told Emily it was because her father loaned the money to the town.

Mr. Grierson - Emily's father, the patriarchal head of the Grierson family. He is implied to have forbidden Emily from marrying. The reason for his refusal to let Emily court men is not explained in the story.

The cousins - Emily's extended relatives from Alabama. They come to town during Emily's courting of Homer Barron to check on Emily's well-being. They are thought of as even more uptight and stuffy than Emily by the townspeople. They are called in to prevent Emily and Homer from marrying; however, they are later sent back home so that the two can be wed. It is speculated that there may be some type of dispute between Emily and the cousins, indicated by them living far away from Emily and the fact that they did not attend Emily's father's funeral.

Tobe - Emily's cook/gardener, who also acts as her family retainer. He is Black and almost never speaks. During the years of her isolation, he provided no details of her life to the townspeople. He promptly disappears directly following her death.

== Structure ==
Faulkner tells the story using two different methods: a series of flashbacks in which the events are told with subjectivity and detail, and from an objective perspective in which the narrator fades into a plural pronoun "we" to demonstrate a linear causality of events. Had the story been told in a linear fashion, this understanding would, perhaps, have been lost, something Faulkner knew and incorporated into the story. By presenting the story in terms of present and past events, he could examine how they influence each other. In terms of mathematical precision, time moves on and what exists is only the present. In terms of the more subjective time, time moves on but memories can exist no matter how much time changes. Those memories stay unhindered.

It starts with the announcement of Emily's death, an event that has the entire town talking. This leads the reader to assume that she was an important figure in the town. As Fassler says in his article The Key, "Clearly, this lady who died unmarried was of importance to everyone. And yet the town itself is eventually divided", by upsetting the linear flow of the chronology of the narration, the short story focuses on the minute details that lead to different conclusions towards the end of the story. If Faulkner presented the story in a linear fashion, the chances of the reader sympathizing with Emily would be far less. By telling the story out of order, the reader sees Emily as a tragic product of her environment rather than a twisted necrophiliac. The reader discovers the town was not dreading Emily's death. Some are sad but most relieved. Emily, after all, was just a "hereditary obligation" who was desperately trying to cling to old traditions and ways of life.

== Themes ==
"A Rose for Emily" discusses many dark themes that characterized the Old South and Southern Gothic fiction.

The story explores themes of death and resistance to change. Also, it reflects the decaying of the societal tenets of the South in the 1930s. Emily Grierson had been controlled by her overbearing father for the first 30 years of her life and she had never questioned it. Once her father had passed, Emily, in denial, refused to give his corpse up for burial—this shows her inability to functionally adapt to change. When the present mayor and aldermen insist Miss Emily pay the taxes which she had been exempted from, she refuses and continues to live in her house. Miss Emily's stubborn insistence that she "pays no taxes in Jefferson" and her mistaking the new mayor for Colonel Sartoris brings into question whether her acts of resistance are a conscious act of defiance or a result of decayed mental stability. The reader is only shown Emily from an external perspective, we can not ascertain whether she acts rationally. The death of Homer, if interpreted as a murder, can be seen in the context of the north–south clash. Homer, notably a northerner, is not one for the tradition of marriage. In the framework that his death was not an accident, but a murder on the part of Emily, Homer's rejection of the marriage can be seen as the North's rejection of Southern tradition. The South ends its relations with the North in retaliation. Emily continuing to sleep next to Homer's body can be seen as the South holding on to an ideal that is no longer feasible.

Control and its repercussions are a persistent theme throughout the story. Emily's father was an intimidating and manipulative figure, keeping her from experiencing life on her terms. She was never able to grow, learn, live her life, start a family, and marry the one she truly loved. Even after Emily's father died, his presence and impact on his daughter were still apparent. Discussing Emily and her father, the townspeople said "We had long thought of them as a tableau, Miss Emily a slender figure in white in the background, her father a spraddled silhouette in the foreground, his back to her and clutching a horsewhip, the two of them framed by the back-flung front door". Emily is portrayed as small and powerless, placed behind the overbearing frame of her father. She wears white, a symbol of innocence and purity. Emily falls victim to the ruling hand of her father and her place in the society: she has to uphold the noblesse oblige into which she was born. In this way, her father's influence remains after he has passed. This control leads to Emily's isolation, both externally and internally imposed. Emily is alone, yet always being watched by the townspeople; she is both apart from and a part of the community. Her position prevents her from ever finding happiness.

The power of death is a consistent theme throughout the story. Emily herself is portrayed as a "skeleton" that is both "small and spare" which is representative of the fact that she emanates death. When it comes to death itself Emily is in denial, most of that feeling has to do with her loneliness. After her father dies, she keeps his corpse for three days and refuses to admit that he is dead before surrendering his body for burial. The reader also sees this with the corpse of Homer Barron, except she is the one who inflicts death upon him. She poisons him and keeps him locked away in her room; she did not want to lose the only other person she had ever loved, so she made his stay permanent. These examples show that the power of death triumphs over everything, including "poor Emily", herself.

Due to this inevitability in the portrayal of death, "A Rose for Emily" is seen as a tale based on determinism, making the short story part of the naturalism literary movement. Here, a character's fate is already determined no matter how much the individual struggles to change it. There are impersonal forces of nature that prevent him or her from taking control. As the very universe itself appears indifferent, this character descends into an inevitable death and decay. The case of Emily is the same. Insanity ran in her family and it is possible her father's motives for keeping her from marrying were to end this genetic blight. This is a more charitable interpretation of Mr. Grierson (and his actions) than is normally imputed to him. No matter what she did, there was the implication that she would ultimately go mad. There was also the depiction of a cursed land due to slavery and the class structure based upon it. No matter how those who clung to the glorious past soldiered on, it was a tarnished way of life that led to ruin to those who clung to it.

== Critical response ==
The story has been discussed and analyzed in a variety of academic publications.

Floyd C. Watkins wrote about the structure of "A Rose for Emily" in Modern Language Notes. Faulkner had to carefully dissect his sections, bringing importance to every aspect of Emily's life. Watkins sees this as a "structural problem" but later praises the symmetry of this short story. Watkins enjoys this story in its entirety, and is impressed by Faulkner's ordering, as building suspense was an important aspect in the response.

The critical response by John Skinner explores the interpretations of Faulkner's short story in detail while reviewing the importance of over-analyzing a piece of literary work. Faulkner published this story in the 1930s. Skinner had published his critical response in 1985. The characters and theme of this tale have been scrutinized by many. Some scholars, including S.W. M. Johnson, posit that "Emily represented a refusal to submit to, or even concede, to the inevitability of change". Whereas, William Going pictures Emily as a rose, "the treasured memory of the Confederate veterans". The point of view according to Skinner is of immediate relevance to the story as the chief character, the narrator tells the chronology of the story. This narrator gives approximately "round figures" for the important events of the accounts. Jack Scherting, in Studies in Short Fiction, discusses that point of view and points out that the story is "related by an anonymous narrator in the first person plural."

Alice Petry introduces a different type of critical response that is not focused on the usual subjects. Rather, she focuses on complex and provocative language. For example, Hall discusses how the sentence, "Thus she passed from generation to generation - dear, inescapable, impervious, tranquil and perverse" has been considered misleading, but is in fact strategically placed to provide foreshadowing and unification of plot. The five descriptive words used in the sentence each correspond to one of the five parts in the order they are seen. For example, the adjective "inescapable" corresponds to Part II, to the incident of the strange smell coming from Miss Emily's home. Faulkner's placement of these adjectives at the end of Part IV serves as an important unifying sentence that connects all five parts to each other.

Jim Barloon of the University of St. Thomas wrote about an idea introduced to him by his students, that Homer was homosexual, possibly providing another reason for his murder. He proposes that Emily did not kill Homer because of her own insecurities, but also because he did not reciprocate her romantic feelings. As Barloon states in his article, "Positing that Homer Barron is gay not only raises a new set of questions but transforms [the story], or at least our perspective of it."

The psychology of Emily Grierson has been analyzed countless times, with many people concluding that she was mentally ill, and from that point, the reasons why. Though many different diagnoses have been made, the most common can be summarized as follows by Nicole Smith in her psychological analysis of the character: "It is reasonable to propose that Miss Emily developed [schizophrenia] as a response to the demanding conditions in which she was living as a Southern woman from an aristocratic family."

Tuncay Tezcan in his analysis of the story states, "It represents the numerous conflicts in the main character's life, illustrating the effect of social change on the individual." Jack Sherting believes Emily suffers from an Oedipus complex. He claims that Emily and her father had an incestuous relationship and she was never able to move past it. Sherting believes Emily used Homer as a replacement for her father and never truly loved him, only used him for her own benefit.

== Adaptations ==
- A Rose for Emily—PBS adaptation with Anjelica Huston.
- My Chemical Romance's song "To The End", from their 2004 album Three Cheers for Sweet Revenge, loosely retells the story of Homer and Miss Emily.
- The Zombies' song "A Rose for Emily" retells the story, and is about a strong theme present in the story: Miss Emily living and dying alone.
- Andrea Camilleri has a similar theme in his novel The Scent of the Night influencing his character Detective Salvo Montalbano.
