= The Town (Faulkner novel) =

1957 novel by William Faulkner

- First edition
- Author: William Faulkner
- Language: English
- Series: Snopes trilogy
- Publisher: Random House
- Publication date: 1957
- Publication place: United States
- Media type: Print (hardback & paperback)
- Pages: 388 pp
- OCLC: 24181257
- Preceded by: A Fable
- Followed by: The Mansion

The Town is a novel by the American author William Faulkner, published in 1957, about the fictional Snopes family of Mississippi. It is the second of the "Snopes" trilogy, following The Hamlet (1940) and completed by The Mansion (1959).

== Plot summary ==
Each chapter is narrated from the point of view of one of three characters: Chick Mallison, Gavin Stevens, or V.K. Ratliff.

Chapter One
(Narrator: Chick Mallison)

Flem moves into Jefferson; is cuckolded by de Spain. De Spain's election. Flem is made power-plant supervisor. Flem steals brass from the plant. Flem plays Tom Tom and Turl off against each other; Turl cuckolds Tom Tom. The firemen hide the brass in the water tower.

Chapter Two
(Narrator: Gavin Stevens)

Eck Snopes saves a Varner Negro, breaking his neck in the process; he is "never in the world a Snopes." He changes jobs several times. Discussion of Snopes family structure, economy. I.O. Snopes comes to town and moves up (e.g., becomes schoolmaster). Children of Eck and I.O. The Snopes Hotel opens.

Chapter Three
(Narrator: Chick Mallison)

Jefferson gossips about Eula. The Cotillion Ball is planned; de Spain invited after some debate. De Spain squeals his tires; under Gavin's instigation, Gowan finally manages to pop one of his tires. De Spain sends Gowan a special corsage; the town experiences a corsage panic leading up to the ball. At the ball, Gavin challenges, fights, and is beaten by de Spain.

Chapter Four
(Narrator: V.K. Ratliff)

Recap: trial of Mink Snopes for killing Jack Houston. Gavin prepares an indictment against de Spain, as mayor, for Flem's theft of the brass at the power plant, largely motivated by his desire to stand up for "the principle that chastity and virtue in women shall be defended whether they exist or not." Gavin receives an anonymous note ...

Chapter Five
(Narrator: Gavin Stevens)

Gavin meets with Eula in his office at night. She offers to sleep with him, out of a desire to keep him from being unhappy. (93) Gavin deduces that Flem is impotent. Gavin analyzes his own personality and Eula's motives, and declines her offer.

Chapter Six
(Narrator: V.K. Ratliff)

De Spain outmaneuvers Gavin on the brass-stealing indictment, rendering the investigation moot. Ratliff speculates about why de Spain appeals to Eula, while Gavin does not. Gavin leaves for Heidelberg.

Chapter Seven
(Narrator: Chick Mallison)

Gavin joins the French service in WWI; catches pneumonia while carrying a stretcher for them. Eck Snopes blows up a gas tank and himself, too, while looking for a missing child, Cedric Nunnery; his neck brace is all that can be found to bury. Montgomery Ward Snopes, in France, goes into the "canteen business," then opens the Atelier Monty when he gets home. Chick and Ratliff form their ice-cream/Snopes-watching association. Bayard Sartoris accidentally kills his grandfather, the Colonel, with that damned newfangled car. Byron Snopes steals money from Sartoris's bank. Wall Snopes begins to set up his trade empire. Brother (?) of Ab Snopes and the watermelon patch. Gavin is home from Europe.

Chapter Eight
(Narrator: Gavin Stevens)

Gavin speculates on the principles of Snopesism (hermaphroditic but vested always in the male); on the relationships between himself, Eula, and de Spain. Flem rises in the bank hierarchy, trading again on Eula; also trading on the fact that he makes good Byron's theft; acquires methodological knowledge of banking. He withdraws his money and deposits it in a competing bank. Wall Snopes graduates, marries a woman who hates the Snopes clan and all they stand for, and goes into business for himself. Flem blocks Wall from getting a loan to expand; Wall expands anyway and opens a wholesale.

Chapter Nine
(Narrator: V.K. Ratliff)

Chapter consists entirely of these sentences: "Because he missed it. He missed it completely."

Chapter Ten
(Narrator: Chick Mallison)

Uncle Willy Christian's drugstore robbed of money and narcotics; night marshal Grover Winbush is nowhere to be found during the event. This starts a chain of events leading to the uncovering of the Atelier Monty as a "dirty picture" "magic lantern," which is why Grover Winbush was not available to catch the perpetrators of the robbery. Flem tries to influence Gavin in the handling of the Montgomery Ward case, then plants whiskey in the Atelier Monty.

Chapter Eleven
(Narrator: V.K. Ratliff)

Chapter consists entirely of this paragraph: "And still he missed it even set--sitting right there in his own office and actively watching Flem rid Jefferson of Montgomery Ward. And still I couldn't tell him." Here, Ratliff is aware that Flem is ensuring that Montgomery Ward will be sent to Parchman (for the whiskey) rather than an out-of-state prison (for the porn, a federal charge) so that he will have a chance to trick Mink into attempting to escape.

Chapter Twelve
(Narrator: Chick Mallison)

Linda is meeting Gavin; Gavin's motive is to "develop her mind." Linda comes to dinner with the Stevens/Mallison family; her boyfriend Matt objects, driving up and down in his racing car. Matt attacks Gavin in his office leaves after giving him a good beating.

Chapter Thirteen
(Narrator: Gavin Stevens)

In which Linda cries a great deal and it becomes apparent that she is willing to marry Gavin, although she doesn't really want to get married at all, despite the fact that she loves Gavin.

Chapter Fourteen
(Narrator: Chick Mallison)

Matt follows Linda around town, gets in a fight with a McCallum boy, and is forced out of town. Gavin buys Linda a traveling case.

Chapter Fifteen
(Narrator: Gavin Stevens)

Gavin speculates on Linda's good name and on the nature of the quality of innocence. He attempts to manage carefully the town's perception of his relationship with Linda by making their encounters seem coincidental. Gavin and Linda avoid each other, then try to meet. Linda reveals her plans to attend the Jefferson Academy for Women (or whatever it's called); Gavin is horrified. He goes to call on Eula (Linda’s mother), who explains how Flem bought his furniture. She tells Gavin to marry Linda. The details of Eula's dowry are clarified.

Chapter Sixteen
(Narrator: Chick Mallison)

(Cf. the short story "Mule in the Yard.") The story of Old Het. Mr. Hait's death; Mrs. Hait snopeses I.O. Snopes over the matter of the killed mules. Mrs. Hait invaded by mules. Her house burns down, but she saves her money. Mrs. Hait buys the mule that burned the house down from I.O. at a reduced price, and shoots it; then she sells it back to I.O. before he discovers that it's dead. Flem forces I.O. back to Frenchman's Bend permanently. Ratliff hypothesizes on Flem's plans and motives, esp re: Linda. Flem, he argues, must now have respectability.

Chapter Seventeen
(Narrator: Gavin Stevens)

Gavin speculates on Flem's "untimely" interest in money. Flem's method/motivation in withdrawing money from his own bank; the effects this had. Gavin speculates on Eula's sexual motives, plus those of Varner & de Spain. Speculation about how Eula disrupts the economy of Snopesism. Flem gives Linda permission to go away to school because he has extracted something more valuable than he gives her. Flem tells Mrs. Varner that Eula is cheating on him.

Chapter Eighteen
(Narrator: V.K. Ratliff)

Ratliff gives Flem a ride out to Frenchman's Bend. Uncle Billy drives in early.

Chapter Nineteen
(Narrator: Chick Mallison)

Polio comes to Jefferson; Chick and schoolmates get an extended holiday while the town officials try to figure out what to do. No one will explain the de Spain-Eula affair to Chick. Ethnography/history of Jefferson. The affair is finally actually public instead of just semi-publicly gossiped about. Eula gives Chick an envelope to give to Gavin.

Chapter Twenty
(Narrator: Gavin Stevens)

Eula's note asks Gavin to meet her in his office at 10pm. Mr. Garraway disapproves of adultery. Geographical description of Yoknapatawpha County. The town waits for the affair to blow up. Eula visits Gavin; reveals how Linda was sent to the Academy, that Flem is impotent, and what Ratliff's first and middle names actually are. Asks Gavin again (several times) to marry Linda.

Chapter Twenty-one
(Narrator: Chick Mallison)

Eula has killed herself. The town is outraged at de Spain; he has to leave. Eula's funeral arrangements are made.

Chapter Twenty-two
(Narrator: Gavin Stevens)

Gavin insists to Linda that Flem is her father; Linda is doubtful.

Chapter Twenty-three
(Narrator: V.K. Ratliff)

Flem's social/financial position is apparently solidified. Eula's monument is delegated to Gavin; he arranges for it. Ratliff suggests that Gavin marry Linda. Linda makes travel plans and departs after she and Flem see her mother's grave.

Chapter Twenty-four
(Narrator: Chick Mallison)

Ratliff/Gavin's theory about Eula's motive for suicide: Eula was bored. The half-Apache children of Byron Snopes come to visit, then are sent back.

== Critical analysis ==
Andrew Lytle has noted Faulkner's particular focus on Flem as the key protagonist of the novel, and discussed the multiple levels of social respectability depicted in the novel. Raymond J Wilson III has examined the mutual corruption of the town of Jefferson by Flem Snopes, and vice versa, as well as details in narrative inconsistencies between events mentioned in The Town and other Faulkner novels. Paul Levine has discussed the recurring themes of love and money in the course of the trilogy.

Owen Robinson has noted the contrast in the narrative style and tone between The Hamlet and The Town. Thomas H Rogers commented critically, in his contemporary review of the novel, in his comparison between the literary merits of The Hamlet and The Town. Peter Swiggart has noted that the events and style in The Town reflect Faulkner's attempts to create a more realistic social milieu compared to his other works.

Preceded by Requiem for a Nun	Novels set in Yoknapatawpha County	Succeeded by The Mansion
