= Snopes trilogy =

Novels by William Faulkner

The Snopes trilogy is a series of three novels written by William Faulkner regarding the Snopes family in the fictional Yoknapatawpha County, Mississippi. It consists of The Hamlet, The Town, and The Mansion. It was begun in 1940 and completed in 1959.
