= The Mansion (novel) =

1959 novel by William Faulkner

- First edition
- Author: William Faulkner
- Language: English
- Series: Snopes trilogy
- Publisher: Random House
- Publication date: 1959
- Publication place: United States
- Media type: Print (Hardback & Paperback)
- Pages: 452
- ISBN: 0-394-70282-4
- OCLC: 2572834
- Preceded by: The Town
- Followed by: The Reivers

The Mansion is a novel by the American author William Faulkner, published in 1959. It is the last in a trilogy of books about the fictional Snopes family of Mississippi, following The Hamlet and The Town.

The Mansion completes Faulkner’s trilogy of novels about the fictional Snopes family in the fictional county of Yoknapatawpha, Mississippi. The trilogy also includes The Hamlet and The Town. Beginning with the murder of Jack Houston, and ending with the murder of Flem Snopes, it traces the downfall of this post-bellum family, who managed to seize control of the town of Jefferson within a generation.

The novel charts the downfall of Flem Snopes at the hands of his relative Mink Snopes, in part aided by Flem's deaf Spanish-Civil-War-veteran daughter, Linda Snopes. It falls into three parts: 'Mink', 'Linda', and 'Flem'. Three narrators tell the story: Gavin Stevens, V.K. Ratliff, and Charles (Chick) Mallison.

== Plot summary ==
Mink Snopes, on trial for murder, waits for his successful cousin Flem to show up and use his power and influence to save him from prison. Flem doesn’t appear, and Mink spends his entire prison sentence waiting until he is free and can murder Flem. Flem knows that Mink will kill him once he is free, so he arranges for Mink to attempt an escape and his sentence is increased. However, after thirty-eight years, Mink is finally released. With the money he has upon release, he buys a cheap gun, finds his way to Jefferson, and kills Flem.

Gavin Stevens, one of the narrators, and an intellectual and idealist, was in love with Flem's wife, Eula Varner, who committed suicide before the events of this novel. Partly because of his feelings for Eula, Stevens loves and idealizes Eula's (and presumably Flem's) daughter, Linda. After Flem is killed, Steven comes to realize that Linda intentionally helped Mink find and kill Flem, as revenge for what she perceives as Flem's role in her mother's suicide. This shakes Stevens's perception of Linda as pure and innocent.

After Flem dies, the townspeople of Jefferson come to realize that his death changed almost nothing, as more and more Snopes family members are appearing and establishing themselves in Jefferson.

== Themes ==
The Mansion deals with the South's displaced economic landscape in the first half of the twentieth century, rural populism, and racial and social tensions.

Theodore Greene has discussed the key characters of the novel and related them to his interpretation of Faulkner's general philosophy of life. Enrique García Díez has examined the change in stature of Mink in the course of the novel, and makes analogies with older literary forms and figures. Gordon Bigelow has commented on the evolution of Faulkner's own attitude towards Flem during the course of the trilogy. Paul Levine has discussed the recurring themes of love and money in the course of the trilogy.

== See also ==
- The Hamlet
- The Town

Preceded by The Town	Novels set in Yoknapatawpha County	Succeeded by The Reivers
