= William Faulkner =

American writer (1897–1962)

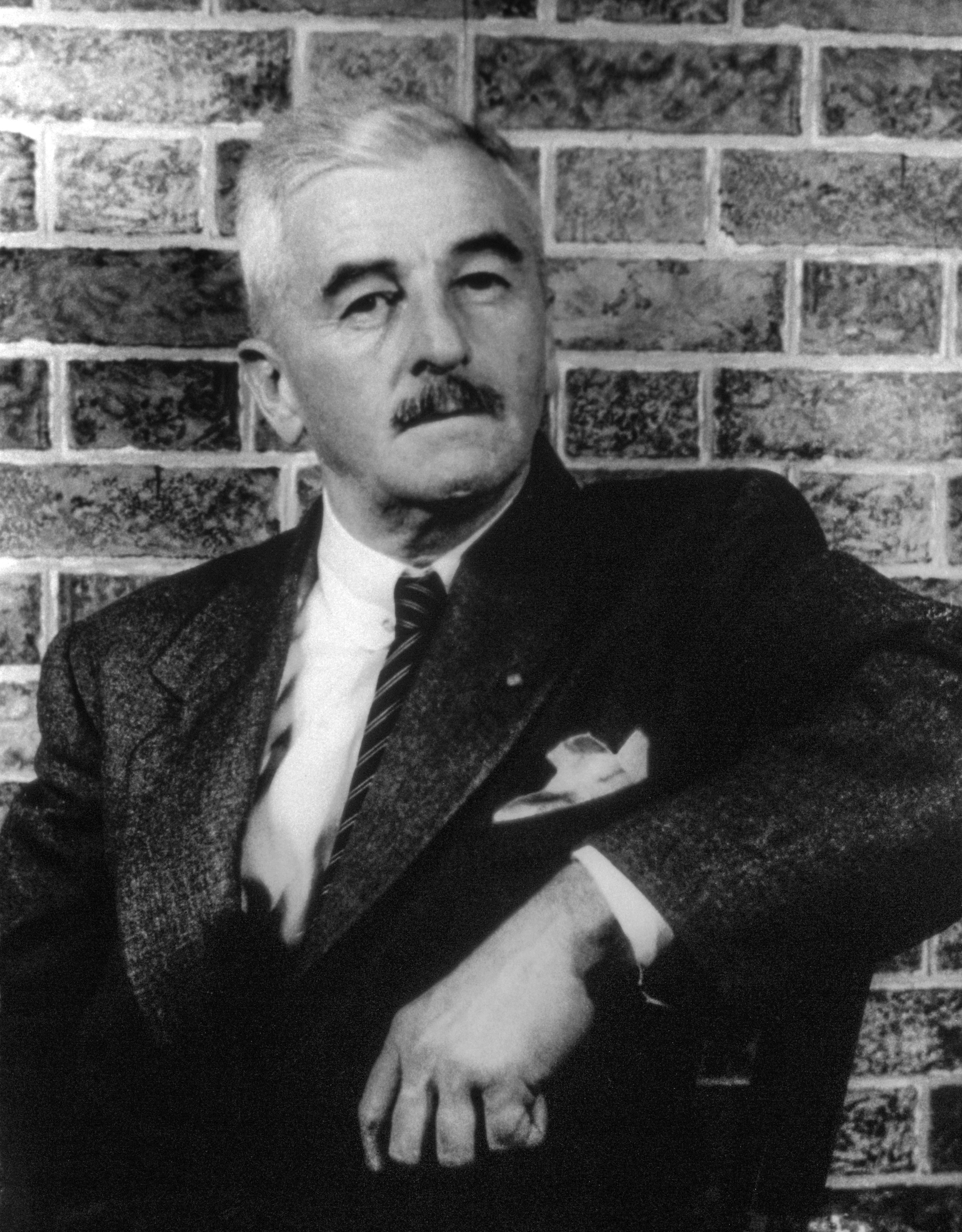
- Faulkner in 1954
- Born: William Cuthbert Falkner; September 25, 1897; New Albany, Mississippi, U.S.
- Died: July 6, 1962 (aged 64); Byhalia, Mississippi, U.S.
- Spouse: Estelle Oldham (m. 1929)
- Children: 1
- Writing career
- Notable works: The Sound and the Fury (1929); As I Lay Dying (1930); Sanctuary (1931); Light in August (1932); Absalom, Absalom! (1936); A Fable (1954)
- Notable awards: Nobel Prize in Literature (1949); National Book Award (1951, 1955); Pulitzer Prize for Fiction (1955, 1963)

William Cuthbert Faulkner (/ˈfɔːknər/ FAWK-nər; né Falkner; September 25, 1897 – July 6, 1962) was an American writer. He is best known for his novels and short stories set in the fictional Yoknapatawpha County, Mississippi, a stand-in for Lafayette County where he spent most of his life. Winner of the 1949 Nobel Prize in Literature, Faulkner is one of the most celebrated writers of American literature, often considered the greatest writer of Southern literature and one of the most influential and important writers of the 20th century.

Faulkner was born in New Albany, Mississippi, and raised in Oxford, Mississippi. During World War I, he joined the Royal Canadian Air Force, but did not serve in combat. Returning to Oxford, he attended the University of Mississippi for three semesters before dropping out. He moved to New Orleans, where he wrote his first novel Soldiers' Pay (1925). He went back to Oxford and wrote Sartoris (1927), his first work set in Yoknapatawpha County. In 1929, he published The Sound and the Fury. The following year, he wrote As I Lay Dying. Later that decade, he wrote Light in August; Absalom, Absalom!; and The Wild Palms. He also worked as a screenwriter, contributing to Howard Hawks's To Have and Have Not and The Big Sleep, adapted from Raymond Chandler's novel.

Faulkner's reputation grew following publication of Malcolm Cowley's The Portable Faulkner (1946), and he was awarded the 1949 Nobel Prize in Literature for "his powerful and unique contribution to the modern American novel." He is the only Mississippi-born Nobel laureate. Two of his works, A Fable (1954) and The Reivers (1962), won the Pulitzer Prize for Fiction. Faulkner died from a heart attack on July 6, 1962, following a fall from his horse the month before. Ralph Ellison called him "the greatest artist the South has produced".

== Life ==
=== Childhood and heritage ===
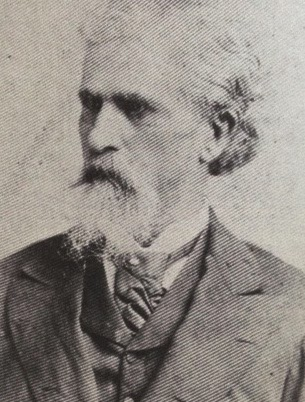
Faulkner was influenced by stories of William Clark Falkner, his paternal great-grandfather and namesake.

Faulkner was born on September 25, 1897, in New Albany, Mississippi, the first of four sons of Murry Cuthbert Falkner and Maud Butler. His family was upper middle-class, but "not quite of the old feudal cotton aristocracy". After Maud rejected Murry's plan to become a rancher in Texas, the family moved to Oxford, Mississippi, in 1902, where Faulkner's father established a livery stable and hardware store before becoming the University of Mississippi's business manager. Except for short periods elsewhere, Faulkner lived in Oxford for the rest of his life.

Faulkner spent his boyhood listening to stories told to him by his elders – stories that spanned the Civil War, slavery, the Ku Klux Klan, and the Faulkner family. Young William was greatly influenced by the history of his family and the region in which he lived. Mississippi marked his sense of humor, his sense of the tragic position of "black and white" Americans, his characterization of Southern characters, and his timeless themes, including fiercely intelligent people who are dwelling behind the façades of good ol' boys and simpletons. He was particularly influenced by stories of his great-grandfather William Clark Falkner, who had become a near legendary figure in North Mississippi. Born into poverty, the elder Falkner was a strict disciplinarian and was a Confederate colonel. Tried and acquitted twice on charges of murder, he became a member of the Mississippi House and became a part-owner of a railroad before being murdered by a co-owner. Faulkner incorporated many aspects of his great-grandfather's biography into his later works.

Faulkner initially excelled in school and skipped the second grade. However, beginning somewhere in the fourth and fifth grades, he became a quieter and more withdrawn child. He occasionally played truant and became indifferent about schoolwork. Instead, he took an interest in studying the history of Mississippi. The decline of his performance in school continued, and Faulkner wound up repeating the eleventh and twelfth grades, never graduating from high school. As a teenager in Oxford, Faulkner dated Estelle Oldham (1897–1972), the popular daughter of Major Lemuel and Lida Oldham, and he also believed he would marry her. However, Estelle dated other boys during their romance, and, in 1918, Cornell Franklin (five years Faulkner's senior) proposed marriage to her before Faulkner did. She accepted. (Note: He proposed marriage to her before Faulkner did. Her parents insisted she marry Franklin for various reasons: he was an Ole Miss law graduate, had recently been commissioned as a major in the Hawaii Army National Guard, and came from a respectable family with whom they were old friends.)

=== Trip to the North and early writings ===
When he was 17, Faulkner met Phil Stone, who became an important early influence on his writing. Stone was four years his senior and came from one of Oxford's older families; he was passionate about literature and had bachelor's degrees from Yale and the University of Mississippi. Stone read and was impressed by some of Faulkner's early poetry, becoming one of the first to recognize and encourage Faulkner's talent. Stone mentored the young Faulkner, introducing him to the works of writers like James Joyce, who influenced Faulkner's own writing. In his early 20s, Faulkner gave poems and short stories he had written to Stone in hopes of them being published. Stone sent these to publishers, but they were uniformly rejected. In spring 1918, Faulkner traveled to live with Stone at Yale, his first trip to the North. Through Stone, Faulkner met writers like Sherwood Anderson, Robert Frost, and Ezra Pound.

During the First World War, Faulkner attempted to join the US Army. There are accounts of this that indicate he was rejected for being under weight and his short stature of 5'5". Other accounts purport to prove that the aforementioned accounts are false. Although he initially planned to join the British Army in hopes of being commissioned as an officer, Faulkner instead joined the Royal Air Force (Canada) with a forged letter of reference and left Yale to receive training in Toronto. He enlisted in Toronto on July 10, 1918, as a Private (II Class), No.173799, in the RAF (C) but never saw active service overseas during the First World War, only training at the recruit depot in Toronto.

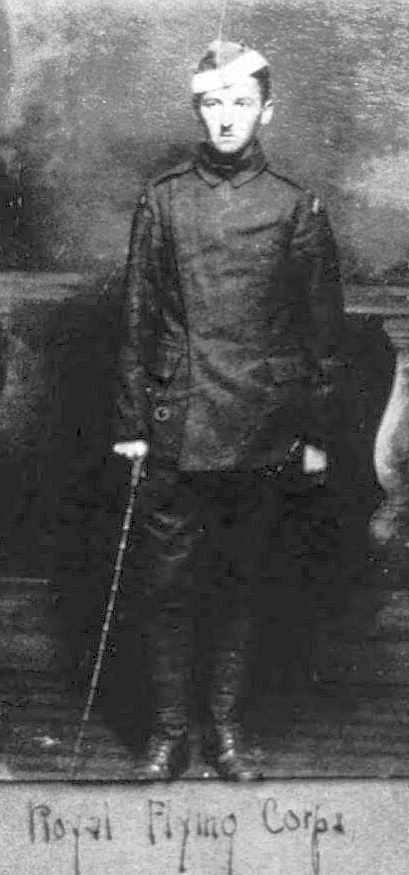
Faulkner as a cadet in the Canadian RAF, 1918

On January 4, 1919, he was discharged as a Private (II Class) due to the end of the War, having served 179 days. Despite claiming so in his letters, Faulkner did not receive cockpit training or ever fly. Returning to Oxford in December 1918, Faulkner told acquaintances false war-stories and even faked a war wound.

In 1918, Faulkner's surname changed from "Falkner" to "Faulkner". According to one story, a careless typesetter made an error. When the misprint appeared on the title page of his first book, Faulkner was asked whether he wanted the change. He supposedly replied, "Either way suits me." His 1918 Attestation Papers for the RAF (C) note his name as "Faulkner". In adolescence, Faulkner began writing poetry almost exclusively. He did not write his first novel until 1925. His literary influences are deep and wide. He once stated that he modeled his early writing on the Romantic era in late 18th- and early 19th-century England.

He attended the University of Mississippi, enrolling in 1919, studying for three semesters before dropping out in November 1920. Faulkner joined the Sigma Alpha Epsilon fraternity, and pursued his dream to become a writer. He skipped classes often and received a "D" grade in English. However, some of his poems were published in campus publications. In 1922, his poem "Portrait" was published in the New Orleans literary magazine Double Dealer. The magazine published his "New Orleans" short story collection three years later. After dropping out, he took a series of odd jobs: at a New York City bookstore, as a carpenter in Oxford, and as the Ole Miss postmaster. He resigned from the post office with the declaration: "I will be damned if I propose to be at the beck and call of every itinerant scoundrel who has two cents to invest in a postage stamp."

=== New Orleans and early novels ===
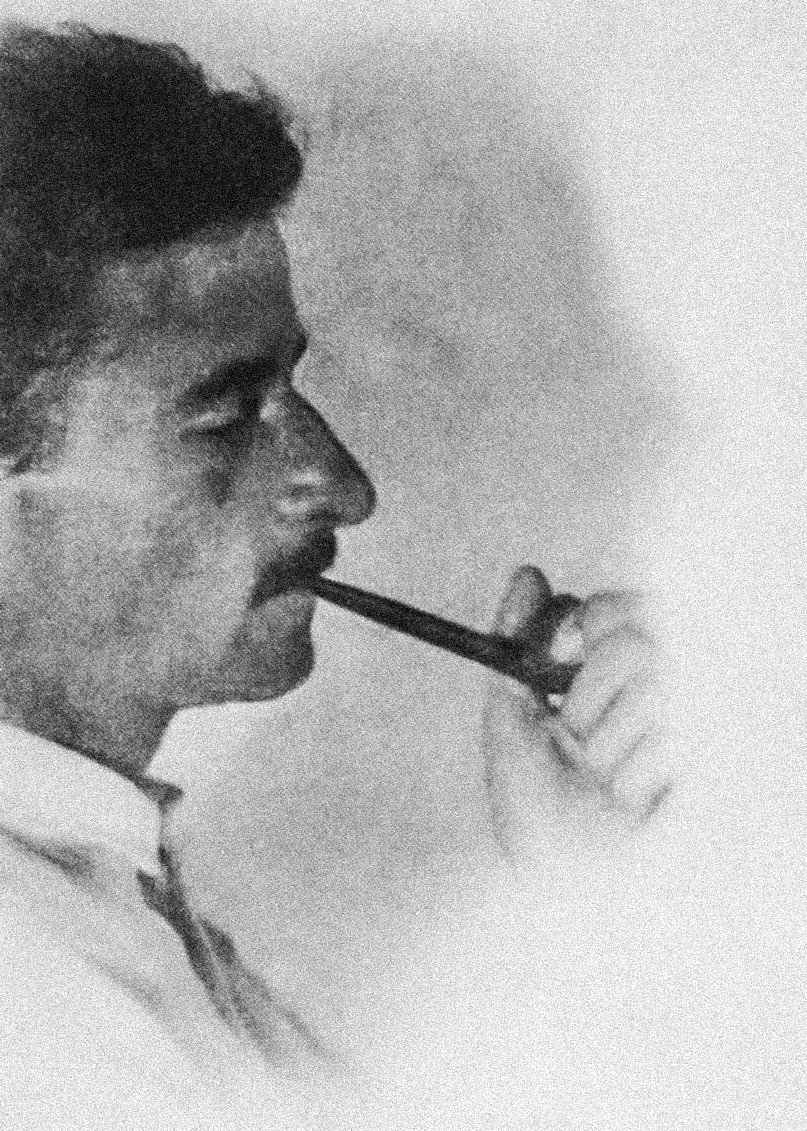
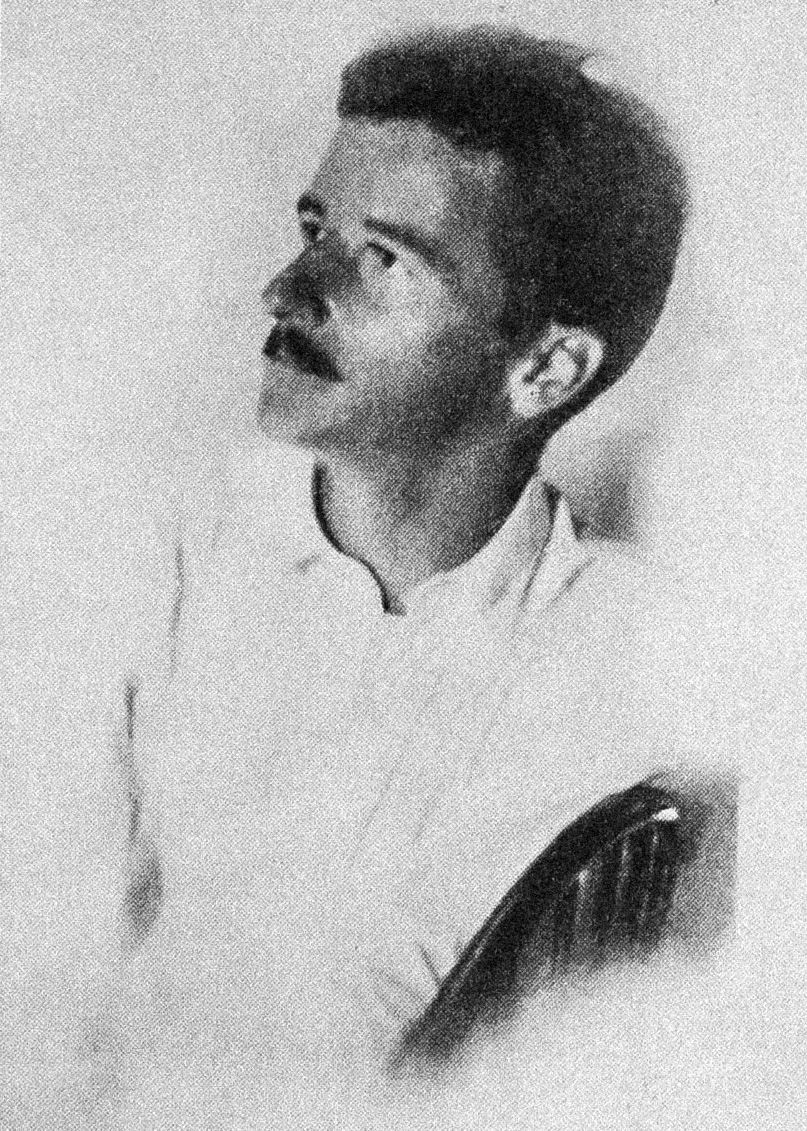
Publicity photographs of Faulkner, summer 1924

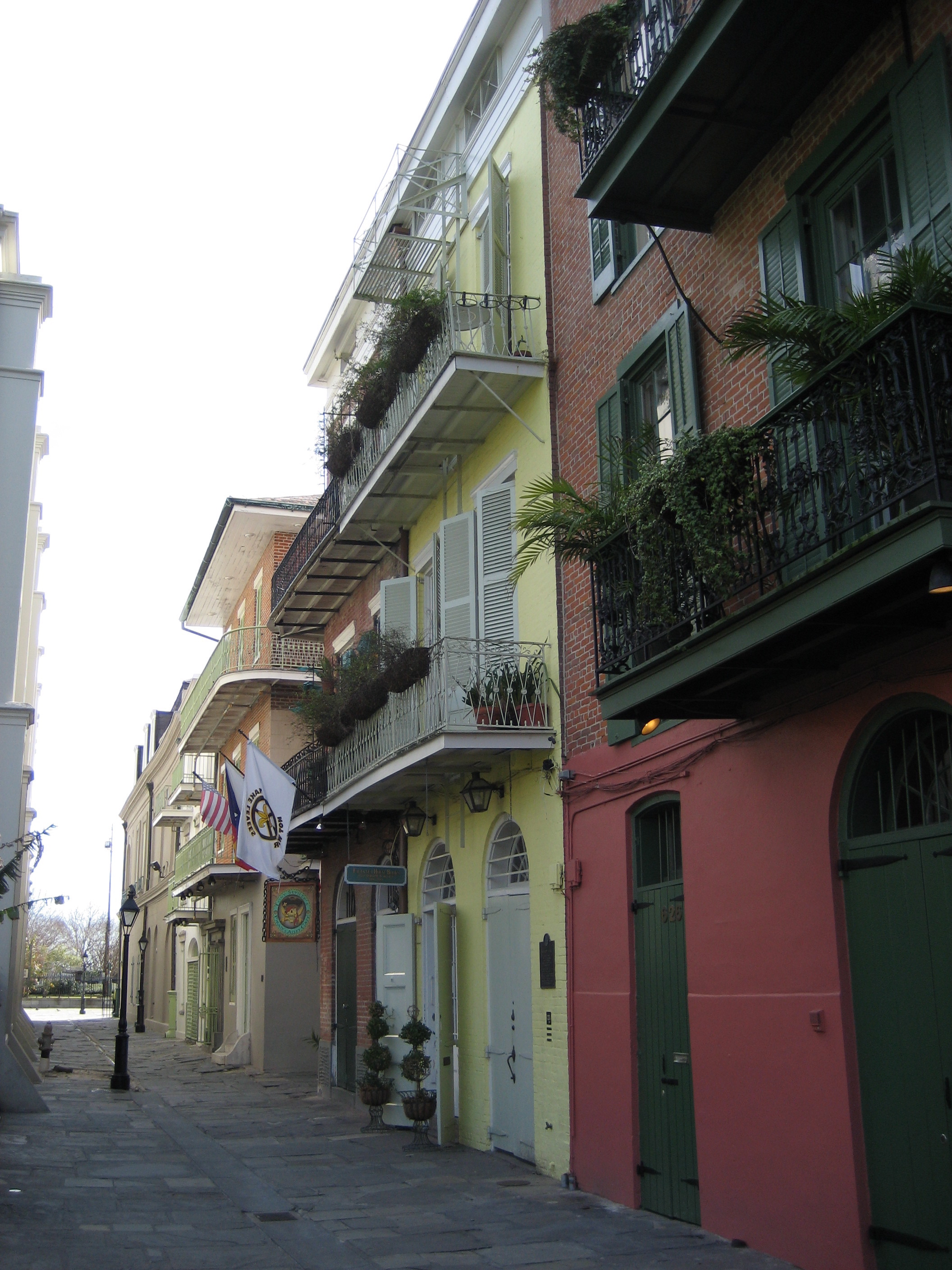
During part of his time in New Orleans, Faulkner lived in a house in the French Quarter (pictured center yellow).

While most writers of Faulkner's generation traveled to and lived in Europe, Faulkner remained writing in the United States. Faulkner spent the first half of 1925 in New Orleans, Louisiana, where many bohemian artists and writers lived, specifically in the French Quarter where Faulkner lived beginning in March. During his time in New Orleans, Faulkner's focus drifted from poetry to prose and his literary style made a marked transition from Victorian to modernist. The Times-Picayune published several of his short works of prose.

After being directly influenced by Sherwood Anderson, Faulkner wrote his first novel, Soldiers' Pay, in New Orleans. Soldiers' Pay and his other early works were written in a style similar to contemporaries Ernest Hemingway and F. Scott Fitzgerald, at times nearly exactly appropriating phrases. Anderson assisted in the publication of Soldiers' Pay and Mosquitoes by recommending them to his publisher. The miniature house at 624 Pirate's Alley, just around the corner from St. Louis Cathedral in New Orleans, is now the site of Faulkner House Books, where it also serves as the headquarters of the Pirate's Alley Faulkner Society.

During the summer of 1927, Faulkner wrote his first novel set in his fictional Yoknapatawpha County, Flags in the Dust. This novel drew heavily from the traditions and history of the South, in which Faulkner had been engrossed in his youth. He was extremely proud of the novel upon its completion and he believed it a significant step up from his previous two novels—however, when submitted for publication to Boni & Liveright, it was rejected. Faulkner was devastated by this rejection but he eventually allowed his literary agent, Ben Wasson, to edit the text, and the novel was published in 1929 as Sartoris. (Note: The original version was issued as Flags in the Dust in 1973.) The work was notable in that it was his first novel that dealt with the Civil War rather than the contemporary emphasis on World War I and its legacy. Eventually Faulkner's daughter, Jill, approached University of Virginia professor Douglas Day about restoring the text. Almost a fourth of the original manuscript had been cut by Wasson to meet the demands of publishers Harcourt, Brace in 1929. Working from a surviving typescript, Day reinstated cut passages but also included at least one added section from the published text. This new edition, published in 1973, also restored Faulkner's original title, Flags in the Dust. A third version by Noel Polk has since replaced Day's and is considered the definitive text by Random House, the current publishers of Faulkner's fiction.

=== The Sound and the Fury ===
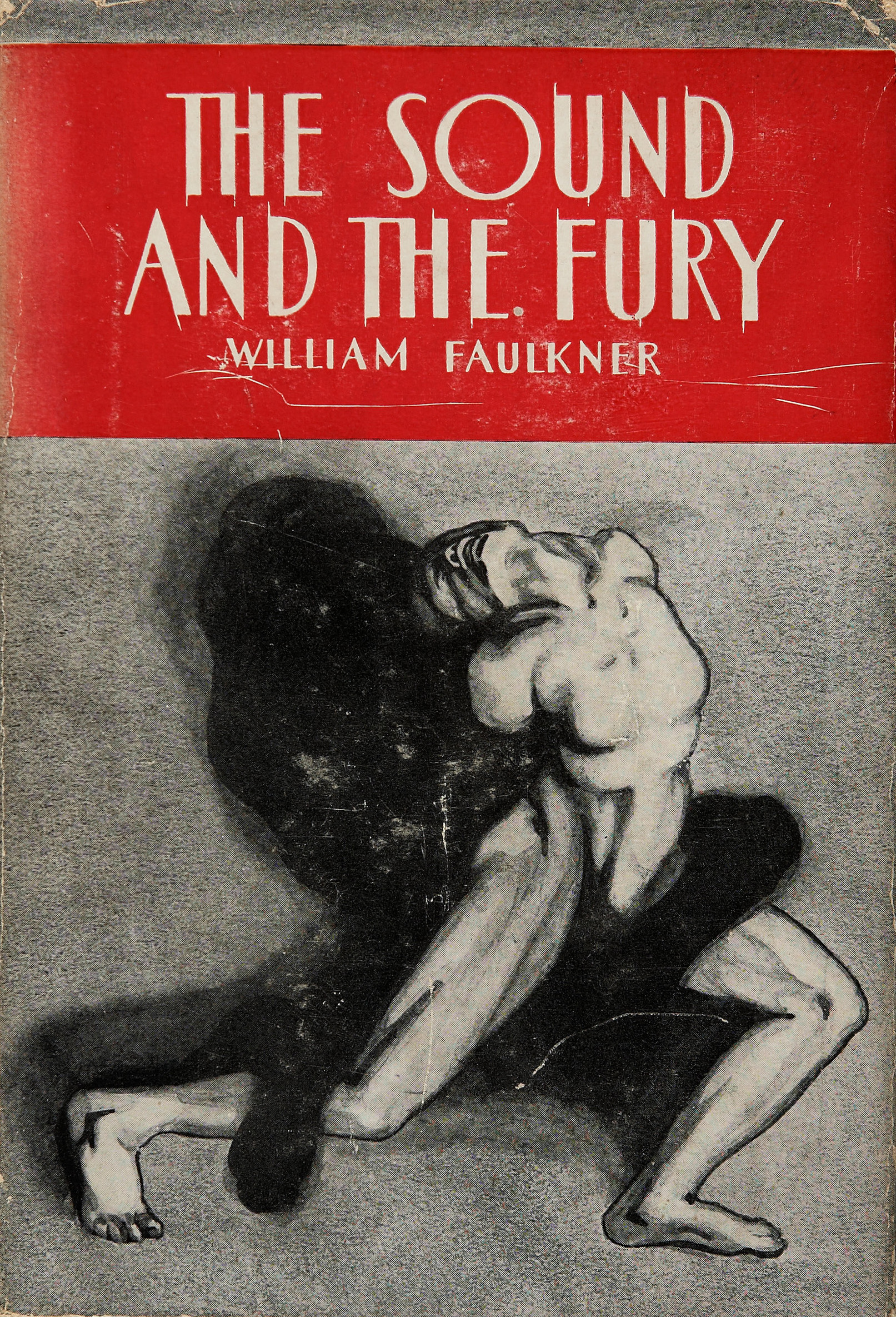
The Sound and the Fury (1929)

In autumn 1928, just after his 31st birthday, Faulkner began working on The Sound and the Fury. He started by writing three short stories about a group of children with the last name Compson, but soon began to feel that the characters he had created might be better suited for a full-length novel. Perhaps as a result of disappointment in the initial rejection of Flags in the Dust, Faulkner had now become indifferent to his publishers and wrote this novel in a much more experimental style. In describing the writing process for this work, Faulkner later said, "One day I seemed to shut the door between me and all publisher's addresses and book lists. I said to myself, 'Now I can write.'" After its completion, Faulkner insisted that Wasson not do any editing or add any punctuation for clarity.

=== 1929–1931 ===
In 1929, Faulkner married Estelle Oldham, with Andrew Kuhn serving as best man at the wedding. Estelle brought with her two children from her previous marriage to Cornell Franklin and Faulkner hoped to support his new family as a writer. Faulkner and Estelle had one child together, daughter Jill (1933–2008). He began writing As I Lay Dying in 1929 while working night shifts at the University of Mississippi Power House. The novel was published in 1930.

Beginning in 1930, Faulkner sent some of his short stories to various national magazines. Several of these were published and brought him enough income to buy a house in Oxford for his family, which he named Rowan Oak. Fueled by a desire to make money, Faulkner wrote Sanctuary. With limited royalties from his work, he published short stories in magazines such as The Saturday Evening Post to supplement his income.

In 1931, Faulkner's first child, a girl they named Alabama, was born but died nine days later.

=== Light in August and Hollywood years ===
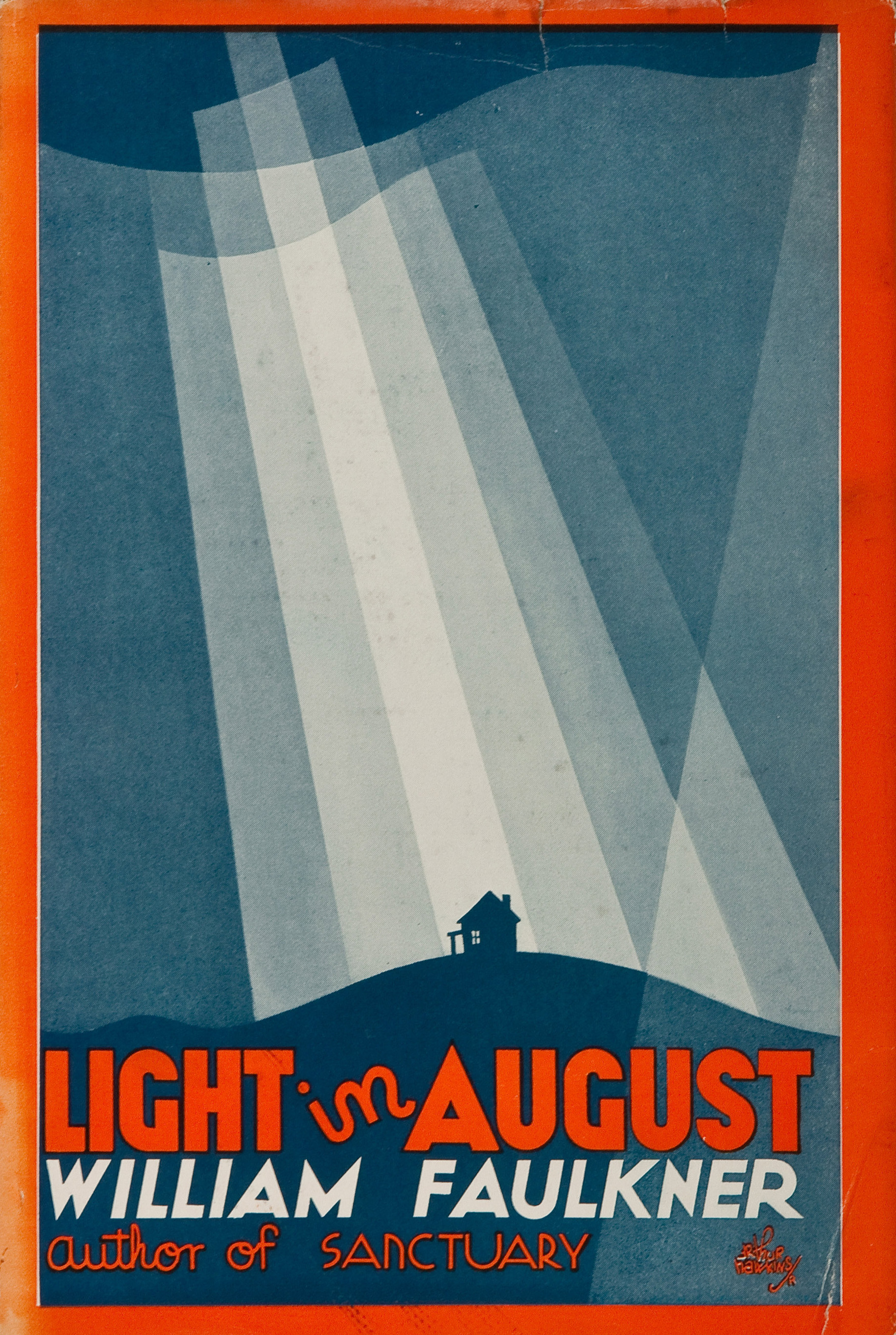
Light in August (1932)

By 1932, Faulkner was in need of money. He asked Wasson to sell the serialization rights for his newly completed novel, Light in August, to a magazine for $5,000, but none accepted the offer. Then MGM Studios offered Faulkner work as a screenwriter in Hollywood. Faulkner was not an avid moviegoer and had reservations about working in the movie industry. As André Bleikasten comments, he "was in dire need of money and had no idea how to get it...So he went to Hollywood." It has been noted that authors like Faulkner were not always hired for their writing prowess but "to enhance the prestige of the ...writers who hired them." He arrived in Culver City, California, in May 1932. The job began a sporadic relationship with moviemaking and with California, which was difficult but he endured in order to earn "a consistent salary that supported his family back home."

Initially, he declared a desire to work on Mickey Mouse cartoons, not realizing that they were produced by Walt Disney Productions and not MGM. His first screenplay was for Today We Live, an adaptation of his short story "Turnabout", which received a mixed response. He then wrote a screen adaptation of Sartoris that was never produced. From 1932 to 1954, Faulkner worked on around 50 films. In early 1944, Faulkner wrote a screenplay adaptation of Ernest Hemingway's novel To Have and Have Not. The film was the first starring Lauren Bacall and Humphrey Bogart. Bogart and Bacall would star in Hawks's The Big Sleep, another film Faulkner worked on.

Faulkner was highly critical of what he found in Hollywood, and he wrote letters that were "scathing in tone, painting a miserable portrait of a literary artist imprisoned in a cultural Babylon." Many scholars have brought attention to the dilemma he experienced and the predicament that caused him serious unhappiness. In Hollywood he worked with director Howard Hawks, with whom he quickly developed a friendship, as they both enjoyed drinking and hunting. Howard Hawks' brother, William Hawks, became Faulkner's Hollywood agent. Faulkner continued to find reliable work as a screenwriter from the 1930s to the 1950s. While staying in Hollywood, Faulkner adopted a "vagrant" lifestyle, living in brief stints in hotels like the Garden of Allah Hotel and frequenting the bar at the Roosevelt Hotel and the Musso & Frank Grill where he was said to have regularly gone behind the bar to mix his own Mint Juleps. He had an extramarital affair with Hawks' secretary and script girl, Meta Carpenter.

With the onset of World War II, in 1942, Faulkner tried to join the United States Air Force but was rejected. He instead worked on local civil defense. The war drained Faulkner of his enthusiasm. He described the war as "bad for writing". Amid this creative slowdown, in 1943, Faulkner began work on a new novel that merged World War I's Unknown Soldier with the Passion of Christ. Published over a decade later as A Fable, it won the 1954 Pulitzer Prize. The award for A Fable was a controversial political choice. The jury had selected Milton Lott's The Last Hunt for the prize, but Pulitzer Prize Administrator Professor John Hohenberg convinced the Pulitzer board that Faulkner was long overdue for the award, despite A Fable being a lesser work of his, and the board overrode the jury's selection, much to the disgust of its members.

By the time of The Portable Faulkner's publication in 1946, most of his novels had been out of print.

=== Nobel Prize and later years ===
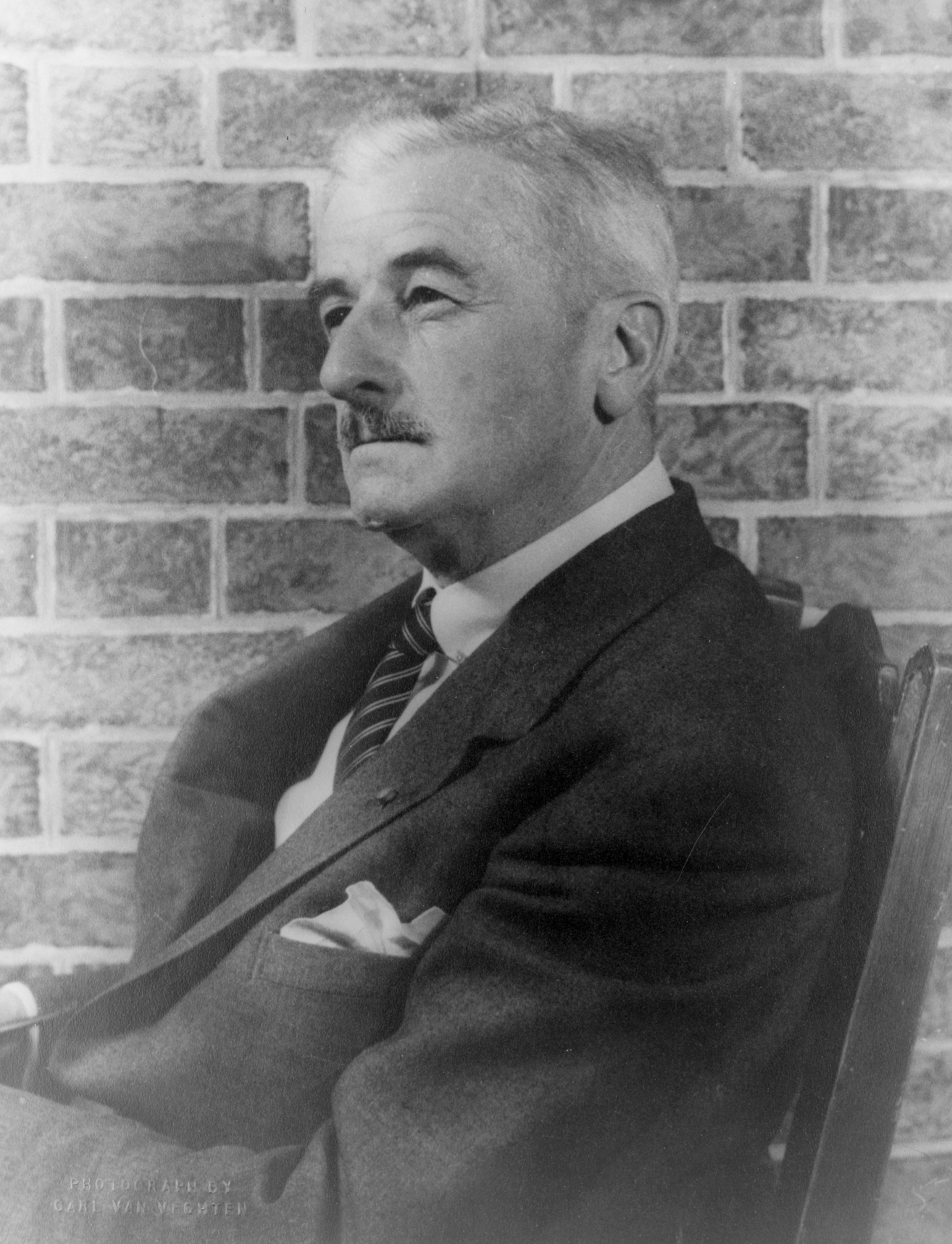
Faulkner in 1954

Faulkner was awarded the 1949 Nobel Prize in Literature for "his powerful and artistically unique contribution to the modern American novel". It was awarded at the following year's banquet along with the 1950 Prize to Bertrand Russell.

When Faulkner visited Stockholm in December 1950 to receive the Nobel Prize, he met Else Jonsson (1912–1996), who was the widow of journalist Thorsten Jonsson (1910–1950). Jonsson, a reporter for Dagens Nyheter from 1943 to 1946, had interviewed Faulkner in 1946 and introduced his works to Swedish readers. Faulkner and Else had an affair that lasted until the end of 1953. At the banquet where they met in 1950, publisher Tor Bonnier introduced Else as the widow of the man responsible for Faulkner winning the Nobel Prize.

Faulkner's Nobel Prize Acceptance Speech on the immortality of the artists, although brief, contained a number of allusions and references to other literary works. However, Faulkner detested the fame and glory that resulted from his recognition. His aversion was so great that his 17-year-old daughter learned of the Nobel Prize only when she was called to the principal's office during the school day. He began by saying: "I feel that this award was not made to me as a man, but to my work – a life's work in the agony and sweat of the human spirit, not for glory and least of all for profit, but to create out of the materials of the human spirit something which did not exist before. So this award is only mine in trust. It will not be difficult to find a dedication for the money part of it commensurate with the purpose and significance of its origin." He donated part of his Nobel money "to establish a fund to support and encourage new fiction writers", eventually resulting in the William Faulkner Foundation (1960–1970).

Controversially, he is noted to have once told J. Robert Oppenheimer at a buffet supper: "Television is for niggers." Faulkner's biographer, Joseph Blotner, attributes this remark to Faulkner's being "in a situation which had produced boredom and resentment, and he ... struck out verbally in response. He did not want to be there with these people, talking about television or anything else, and he simply choked off the conversation as quickly as he could." Critic Thomas Powers claims that this statement shows how "for many white southerners [like Faulkner] nothing changed with the end of slavery except slavery."

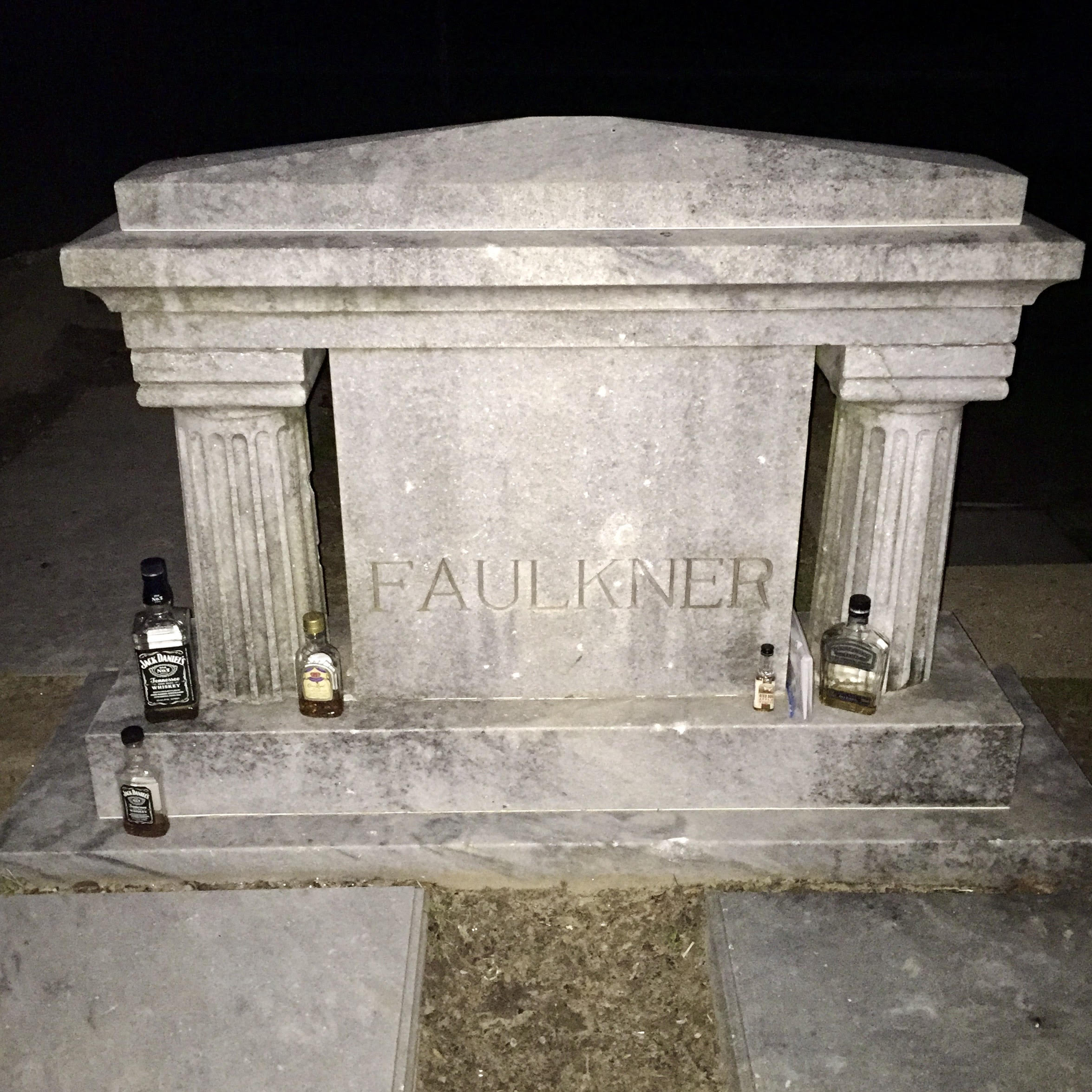
Faulkner's headstone located in St. Peter's Cemetery in Oxford, Mississippi, USA

In 1951, Faulkner received the Chevalier de la Légion d'honneur medal from the government of France.

Faulkner served as the first Writer-in-Residence at the University of Virginia at Charlottesville from February to June 1957 and again in 1958.

In 1961, Faulkner began writing his nineteenth and final novel, The Reivers. The novel is a nostalgic reminiscence, in which an elderly grandfather relates a humorous episode in which he and two boys stole a car to drive to a Memphis bordello. In summer 1961, he finished the first draft. During this time, he injured himself in a series of falls.

On June 17, 1962, Faulkner suffered a serious injury in a fall from his horse, which led to thrombosis. He suffered a fatal heart attack on July 6, 1962, at the age of 64, at Wright's Sanatorium in Byhalia, Mississippi. Faulkner is buried with his family in St. Peter's Cemetery in Oxford. Faulkner's funeral and graveside service were documented by photographer Martin J. Dain.

== Writing ==
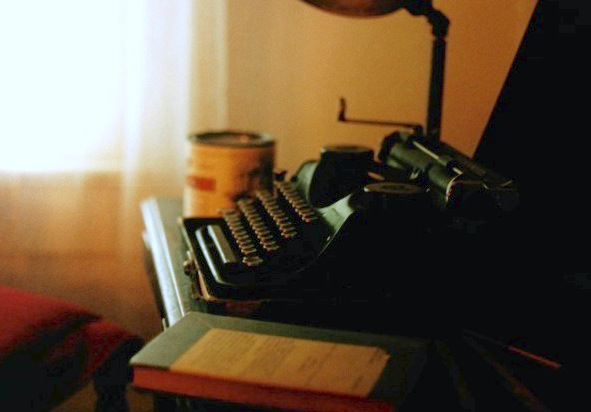
One of Faulkner's typewriters

From the early 1920s to the outbreak of World War II, Faulkner published 13 novels and many short stories. This body of work formed the basis of his reputation and earned him the Nobel Prize at age 52. Faulkner's prodigious output include celebrated novels such as The Sound and the Fury (1929), As I Lay Dying (1930), Light in August (1932), and Absalom, Absalom! (1936). He was also a prolific writer of short stories.

Faulkner's first short story collection, These 13 (1931), includes many of his most acclaimed (and most frequently anthologized) stories, including "A Rose for Emily", "Red Leaves", "That Evening Sun", and "Dry September". He set many of his short stories and novels in Yoknapatawpha County—which was based on and nearly geographically identical to Lafayette County (of which his hometown of Oxford, Mississippi, is the county seat). Yoknapatawpha was Faulkner's "postage stamp", and the bulk of work that it represents is widely considered by critics to amount to one of the most monumental fictional creations in the history of literature. Three of his novels, The Hamlet, The Town and The Mansion, known collectively as the Snopes trilogy, document the town of Jefferson and its environs, as an extended family headed by Flem Snopes insinuates itself into the lives and psyches of the general populace. Yoknapatawpha County has been described as a mental landscape.

His short story "A Rose for Emily" was his first story published in a major magazine, the Forum, but received little attention from the public. After revisions and reissues, it gained popularity and is now considered one of his best.

Faulkner wrote two volumes of poetry which were published in small printings, The Marble Faun (1924), and A Green Bough (1933), and a collection of mystery stories, Knight's Gambit (1949).

=== Style and technique ===
The peacefullest words. Peacefullest words. Non fui. Sum. Fui. Non sum. Somewhere I heard bells once. Mississippi or Massachusetts. I was. I am not. Massachusetts or Mississippi. Shreve has a bottle in his trunk. Aren't you even going to open it Mr and Mrs Jason Richmond Compson announce the Three times. Days. Aren't you even going to open it marriage of their daughter Candace that liquor teaches you to confuse the means with the end I am. Drink. I was not. Let us sell Benjy's pasture so that Quentin may go to Harvard and I may knock my bones together and together. I will be dead in. Was it one year Caddy said.

— An example of Faulkner's prose in The Sound and the Fury (1929)

Carl Rollyson has argued that, "as an artist," Faulkner believed "he should be above worldly concerns and even morality." Faulkner was known for his experimental style with meticulous attention to diction and cadence. In contrast to the minimalist understatement of his contemporary Ernest Hemingway, Faulkner made frequent use of stream of consciousness in his writing, and wrote often highly emotional, subtle, cerebral, complex, and sometimes Gothic or grotesque stories of a wide variety of characters including former slaves or descendants of slaves, poor white, agrarian, or working-class Southerners, and Southern aristocrats.

Faulkner's contemporary critical reception was mixed, with The New York Times noting that many critics regarded his work as "raw slabs of pseudorealism that had relatively little merit as serious writing". His style has been described as "impenetrably convoluted".

In an interview with The Paris Review in 1956, Faulkner remarked:

Let the writer take up surgery or bricklaying if he is interested in technique. There is no mechanical way to get the writing done, no shortcut. The young writer would be a fool to follow a theory. Teach yourself by your own mistakes; people learn only by error. The good artist believes that nobody is good enough to give him advice. He has supreme vanity. No matter how much he admires the old writer, he wants to beat him.

In that same interview, Jean Stein says "Some people say they can't understand your writing, even after they read it two or three times. What approach would you suggest for them?" Faulkner replies: "Read it four times."

When asked about his influences, Faulkner says "the books I read are the ones I knew and loved when I was a young man and to which I return as you do to old friends: the Old Testament, Dickens, Conrad, Cervantes, Don Quixote—I read that every year, as some do the Bible. Flaubert, Balzac—he created an intact world of his own, a bloodstream running through twenty books—Dostoyevsky, Tolstoy, Shakespeare. I read Melville occasionally and, of the poets, Marlowe, Campion, Jonson, Herrick, Donne, Keats, and Shelley."

Like his contemporaries James Joyce and T. S. Eliot, Faulkner uses stories and themes from classic literature in a modern context. Joyce, in Ulysses, modeled the journey of his hero Leopold Bloom on the adventures of Odysseus. Eliot, in his essay "Ulysses, Order and Myth", wrote that "In using the myth, in manipulating a continuous parallel between contemporaneity and antiquity, Mr. Joyce is pursuing a method which others must pursue after him. They will not be imitators, any more than the scientist who uses the discoveries of an Einstein in pursuing his own, independent, further investigations. It is simply a way of controlling, of ordering, of giving a shape and a significance to the immense panorama of futility and anarchy which is contemporary history." Faulkner's allusions to earlier authors are evidenced by his titles; the title of The Sound and the Fury comes from Macbeth's soliloquy: "it is a tale/ Told by an idiot, full of sound and fury,/ Signifying nothing." The opening of the novel is told from the perspective of the intellectually disabled Benjy Compson. The title of As I Lay Dying comes from Homer's Odyssey, where it is spoken by Agamemnon in the past tense: "As I lay dying, the woman with the dog's eyes would not close my eyes as I descended into Hades." Faulkner's novel, in contrast, is narrated in the present tense. The title of Go Down, Moses is from an African American spiritual, and the book is dedicated "To Mammy / Caroline Barr / Mississippi / [1840–1940] Who was born in slavery and who gave to my family a fidelity without stint or calculation of recompense and to my childhood an immeasurable devotion and love."

=== Themes and analysis ===
Faulkner advocated a gradual abolition of racial segregation and made racial prejudices the subject of a number of his works including Intruder in the Dust, but was critical of forced or fast-moving desegregation. In 1956, he argued against school segregation in Harper's Magazine. He argued that civil rights activists should "go slow" and be more moderate in their positions. The essayist and novelist James Baldwin, in his 1956 essay "Faulkner and Desegregation" in Partisan Review, was highly critical of Faulkner's views around racial desegregation, criticizing his "go slow" argument "after more than two hundred years in slavery and ninety years of quasi-freedom" and seeing him as part of a group of educated white Southeners who falsely believed that there could be a middle ground between segregationists and integrationists. Ralph Ellison said that "No one in American fiction has done so much to explore the types of Negro personality as has Faulkner."

The New Critics became interested in Faulkner's work, with Cleanth Brooks writing The Yoknapatawpha Country and Michael Millgate writing The Achievement of William Faulkner. Since then, critics have looked at Faulkner's work using other approaches, such as feminist and psychoanalytic methods. Faulkner's works have been placed within the literary traditions of modernism and the Southern Renaissance.

French philosopher Albert Camus wrote that Faulkner successfully imported classical tragedy into the 20th century through his "interminably unwinding spiral of words and sentences that conducts the speaker to the abyss of sufferings buried in the past".

== Legacy ==
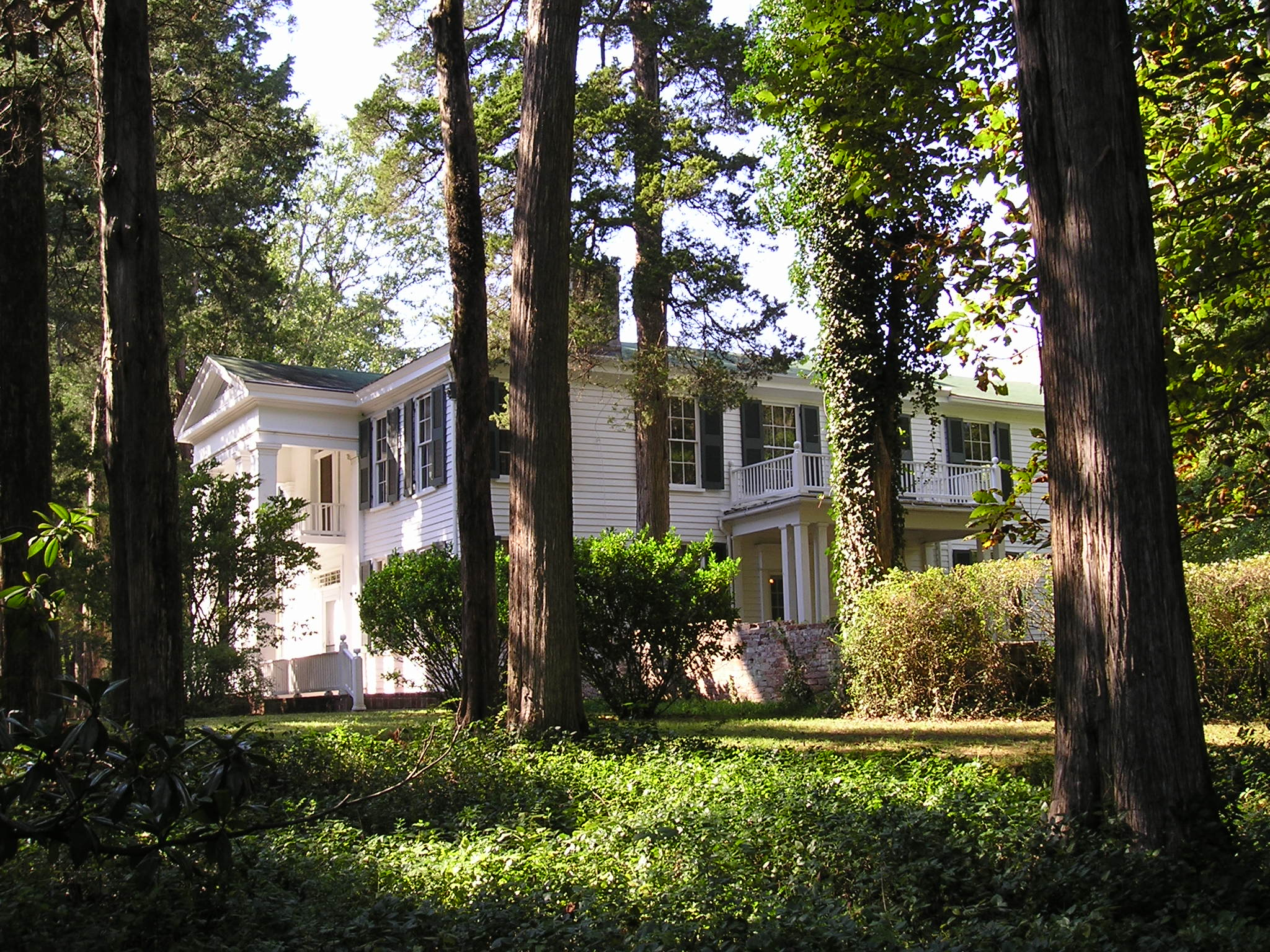
Faulkner's home Rowan Oak is maintained by the University of Mississippi.

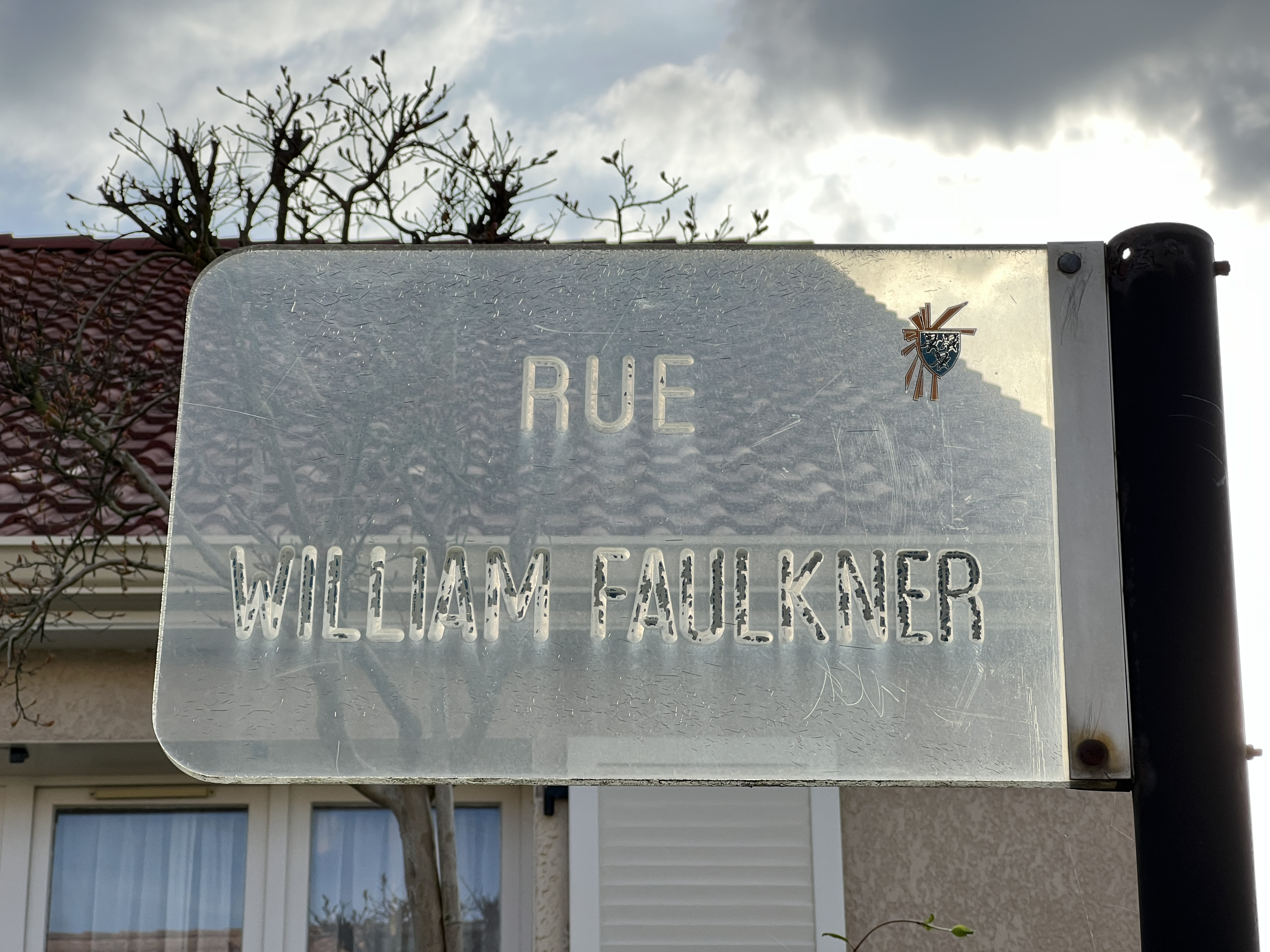
A Parisian street named for Faulkner

=== Influence ===
Faulkner is widely considered a towering figure in Southern literature; Flannery O'Connor wrote that "the presence alone of Faulkner in our midst makes a great difference in what the writer can and cannot permit himself to do. Nobody wants his mule and wagon stalled on the same track the Dixie Limited is roaring down". In 1943, while working at Warner Brothers, Faulkner wrote a letter of encouragement to a young Mississippi writer, Eudora Welty. According to critic and translator Valerie Miles, Faulkner's influence on Latin American fiction is considerable, with fictional worlds created by Gabriel García Márquez (Macondo) and Juan Carlos Onetti (Santa Maria) being "very much in the vein of" Yoknapatawpha, and that "Carlos Fuentes's The Death of Artemio Cruz wouldn't exist if not for As I Lay Dying". Fuentes himself cited Faulkner as one of the writers most important to him. Faulkner had great influence on Mario Vargas Llosa, particularly on his early novels The Time of the Hero, The Green House and Conversation in The Cathedral. Vargas Llosa has claimed that during his student years he learned more from Yoknapatawpha than from classes. Jorge Luis Borges is credited with the translation of Faulkner's The Wild Palms into Spanish, although Douglas Day believes it's not impossible that Borges' mother may have done the translation. Day also believes that Borges' deep immersion in and study of The Wild Palms may have influenced him to abandon the novel as his own writing form of choice.

The works of William Faulkner are a clear influence on the French novelist Claude Simon, and the Portuguese novelist António Lobo Antunes. Cormac McCarthy has been described as a "disciple of Faulkner".

In The Elements of Style, E. B. White cites Faulkner: "If the experiences of Walter Mitty, of Dick Diver, of Rabbit Angstrom have seemed for the moment real to countless readers, if in reading Faulkner we have almost the sense of inhabiting Yoknapatawpha County during the decline of the South, it is because the details used are definite, the terms concrete." Later, Faulkner's style is contrasted with that of Hemingway.

After his death, Estelle and their daughter, Jill, lived at Rowan Oak until Estelle's death in 1972. The property was sold to the University of Mississippi that same year. The house and furnishings are maintained much as they were in Faulkner's day. Faulkner's scribblings are preserved on the wall, including the day-by-day outline covering a week he wrote on the walls of his small study to help him keep track of the plot twists in his novel A Fable. Some of Faulkner's Nobel Prize winnings went to establish the William Faulkner Foundation. It gave an Award for Notable First Novel; winners included John Knowles's A Separate Peace, Thomas Pynchon's V., Cormac McCarthy's The Orchard Keeper, Robert Coover's The Origin of the Brunists and Frederick Exley's A Fan's Notes. Starting in 1981, this became the PEN/Faulkner Award for Fiction, founded by, among others, Mary Lee Settle as an alternative to the National Book Award.

Some of Faulkner's works have been adapted into films. They have received a polarized response, with many critics contending that Faulkner's works are "unfilmable". Faulkner's final work, The Reivers, was adapted into a 1969 film starring Steve McQueen. Tommy Lee Jones's neo-Western film The Three Burials of Melquiades Estrada was partly based on Faulkner's As I Lay Dying.

During the Nazi Occupation of France in World War II, the German occupiers banned American literature. A black-market of American books emerged, and reading works by Hemingway and Faulkner became an act of defiance. Faulkner remains especially popular in France, where a 2009 poll found him the second most popular writer (after only Marcel Proust). Contemporary Jean-Paul Sartre stated that "for young people in France, Faulkner is a god", and Albert Camus made a stage adaptation of Faulkner's Requiem for a Nun. In Jean-Luc Godard's Breathless, Patricia (Jean Seberg) quotes The Wild Palms: "Between grief and nothing, I will take grief."

He also won the U.S. National Book Award twice, for Collected Stories in 1951 and A Fable in 1955.

The United States Postal Service issued a 22-cent postage stamp in his honor on August 3, 1987. Faulkner had once served as Postmaster at the University of Mississippi, and in his letter of resignation in 1923 wrote:

As long as I live under the capitalistic system, I expect to have my life influenced by the demands of moneyed people. But I will be damned if I propose to be at the beck and call of every itinerant scoundrel who has two cents to invest in a postage stamp. This, sir, is my resignation.

On October 10, 2019, a Mississippi Writers Trail historical marker was installed at Rowan Oak in Oxford, Mississippi, honoring the contributions of William Faulkner to the American literary landscape.

Faulkner has a tribute on Mississippi's float for the 137th Rose Parade.

=== Collections ===
The manuscripts of most of Faulkner's works, correspondence, personal papers, and over 300 books from his working library reside at the Albert and Shirley Small Special Collections Library at the University of Virginia, where he spent much of his time in his final years. The library also houses some of the writer's personal effects and the papers of major Faulkner associates and scholars, such as his biographer Joseph Blotner, bibliographer Linton Massey, and Random House editor Albert Erskine.

Southeast Missouri State University, where the Center for Faulkner Studies is located, also owns a generous collection of Faulkner materials, including first editions, manuscripts, letters, photographs, artwork, and many materials pertaining to Faulkner's time in Hollywood. The university possesses many personal files and letters kept by Joseph Blotner, along with books and letters that once belonged to Malcolm Cowley. The university achieved the collection due to a generous donation by Louis Daniel Brodsky, a collector of Faulkner materials, in 1989.

Further significant Faulkner materials reside at the University of Mississippi, the Harry Ransom Center, and the New York Public Library. The Random House records at Columbia University also include letters by and to Faulkner. In 1966, the United States Military Academy dedicated a William Faulkner Room in its library.

== Selected list of works ==
- The Sound and the Fury (1929)
- As I Lay Dying (1930)
- Sanctuary (1931)
- Light in August (1932)
- Absalom, Absalom! (1936)
- The Wild Palms (1939)
- The Hamlet (1940)
- Go Down, Moses (1942)
- Intruder in the Dust (1948)
- A Fable (1954)
- The Town (1957)
- The Mansion (1959)
- The Reivers (1962)

== Filmography ==
- Flesh (1932)
- Today We Live (1933)
- The Story of Temple Drake (1933)
- Submarine Patrol (1938)
- Air Force (1943)
- To Have and Have Not (1944)
- The Big Sleep (1946)
- Land of the Pharaohs (1955)
- The Tarnished Angels (1957)
- The Reivers (1969)

== Notes and references ==
=== Works cited ===
- Bartunek, C. J. (Summer 2017). "The Wasteland Revisited: William Faulkner's First Year in Hollywood". South Atlantic Review. 82 (2): 97–116. JSTOR 90013647. Archived from the original on June 25, 2021.
- Camus, Albert (1970). Thody, Philip (ed.). Lyrical and Critical Essays. Translated by Kennedy, Ellen Conroy. Vintange. ISBN 0394708520.
- Capps, Jack L. (Spring 1966). "West Point's William Faulkner Room". The Georgia Review. 20 (1): 3–8. JSTOR 41396230. Archived from the original on June 25, 2021.
- William Faulkner: Novels 1930–1935 (Joseph Blotner and Noel Polk, ed.) (Library of America, 1985) ISBN 978-0-940450-26-4
- William Faulkner: Novels 1936–1940 (Joseph Blotner and Noel Polk, eds.) (Library of America, 1990) ISBN 978-0-940450-55-4
- William Faulkner: Novels 1942–1954 (Joseph Blotner and Noel Polk, eds.) (Library of America, 1994) ISBN 978-0-940450-85-1
- William Faulkner: Novels 1957–1962 (Noel Polk, ed., with notes by Joseph Blotner) (Library of America, 1999) ISBN 978-1-883011-69-7
- William Faulkner: Novels 1926–1929 (Joseph Blotner and Noel Polk, eds.) (Library of America, 2006) ISBN 978-1-931082-89-1
- The Portable Faulkner, ed. Malcolm Cowley (Viking Press, 1946). ISBN 978-0-14-243728-5
- Blotner, Joseph (1974). Faulkner: A Biography (2 vols). Random House.
- Blotner, Joseph. Faulkner: A Biography. New York: Random House, 1984.
- Fowler, Doreen, Abadie, Ann. Faulkner and Popular Culture: Faulkner and Yoknapatawpha. Univ. Press of Mississippi, 1990, ISBN 978-0-87805-434-3
- Jaillant, Lise. "'I'm Afraid I've Got Involved With a Nut': New Faulkner Letters." Southern Literary Journal 47.1 (2014): 98–114. Archived May 29, 2021, at the Wayback Machine
- Kerr, Elizabeth Margaret, and Kerr, Michael M. William Faulkner's Yoknapatawpha: A Kind of Keystone in the Universe. Fordham Univ Press, 1985, ISBN 978-0-8232-1135-7
- Koch, Benjamin (Winter 2007). "The French Quarter Apprentice: William Faulkner's Modernist Evolution". Louisiana History: The Journal of the Louisiana Historical Association. 48 (1): 55–68. JSTOR 4234243. Archived from the original on June 25, 2021.
- Liénard-Yeterian, Marie. 'Faulkner et le cinéma', Paris: Michel Houdiard Editeur, 2010.ISBN 978-2-35692-037-9
- Minter, David L. (1980). William Faulkner, his life and work. Baltimore, MD: Johns Hopkins University Press. ISBN 9780801823473.
- McKay, David (Fall 2009). "Faulkner's First War: Conflict, Mimesis, and the Resonance of Defeat". South Central Review. 26 (3). The Johns Hopkins University Press: 119–130. doi:10.1353/scr.0.0062. JSTOR 40645990. S2CID 144583260. Archived from the original on June 25, 2021.
- Phillips, Gene D. (1980). Hemingway and Film. New York: Frederick Ungar Publishing Co. ISBN 978-0804426954.
- Sensibar, Judith L. The Origins of Faulkner's Art. Austin: University of Texas Press, 1984. ISBN 0-292-79020-1
- Sensibar, Judith L. Faulkner and Love: The Women Who Shaped His Art, A Biography. New Haven: Yale University Press, 2008. ISBN 978-0-300-16568-5
- Sensibar, Judith L. Vision in Spring. Austin: University of Texas Press, 1984. ISBN 0-292-78712-X.
- O'Connor, William Van (1959). William Faulkner. Minneapolis: University of Minnesota Press.
- Parini, Jay (2004). One Matchless Time: A Life of William Faulkner. New York: HarperCollins. pp. 22–29. ISBN 0-06-621072-0.
- Pikoulis, John (1982). The Art of William Faulkner. Totowa, New Jersey: Barnes & Noble Books. ISBN 9780333300947.
- Rosella Mamoli Zorzi (2000). William Faulkner in Venice : proceedings of the International Conference Language, Stylistics, Translations. Venice: Marsilio. p. 347. ISBN 9788831776264. OCLC 634327206.
- Rife, David (March 1983). "Rex Stout and William Faulkner's Nobel Prize Speech". Journal of Modern Literature. 10 (1). Indiana University Press: 151–152. JSTOR 3831202. Archived from the original on June 25, 2021.
- Zeitlin, Michael (Spring 2016). "Faulkner and the Royal Air Force Canada, 1918". The Faulkner Journal. 30 (1). Johns Hopkins University: 15–38. doi:10.1353/fau.2016.0009. JSTOR 44578811. S2CID 165335050. Archived from the original on June 24, 2021.
- Bleikasten, André (2017). William Faulkner: A Life through Novels. Bloomington: Indiana University. p. 218. ISBN 9780253023322. Archived from the original on May 29, 2021.

=== General references ===
- Yeğin, Fatma Kalpaklı (January 1, 2019). "OPPRESSION AND ITS EFFECTS ON THE INDIVIDUAL AND SOCETY IN FAULKNER'S A ROSE FOR EMILY". PROCEEDINGS BOOK EL RUHA 5th INTERNATIONAL CONFERENCE ON SOCIAL SCIENCES: 31–38.
