= Sanctuary (1961 film) =

1961 film by Tony Richardson

- Theatrical release poster
- Directed by: Tony Richardson
- Written by: Ruth Ford; James Poe
- Based on: Sanctuary (1931 novel) by William Faulkner Requiem for a Nun (1951 novel) by William Faulkner
- Produced by: Richard D. Zanuck; Darryl F. Zanuck
- Starring: Lee Remick; Yves Montand; Bradford Dillman; Odetta
- Cinematography: Ellsworth Fredericks
- Edited by: Robert L. Simpson
- Music by: Alex North
- Distributed by: 20th Century-Fox
- Release date: April 18, 1961
- Running time: 90 minutes
- Country: United States
- Language: English
- Budget: $1.9 million

Sanctuary is a 1961 American Southern Gothic drama film directed by Tony Richardson in his Hollywood debut, based on the William Faulkner novels Sanctuary (1931) and Requiem for a Nun (1951). It stars Lee Remick, Yves Montand, Bradford Dillman, and Odetta in her film debut. It was released by 20th Century Fox on April 18, 1961.

== Plot ==
In 1928 in Yoknapatawpha, Mississippi, a Black woman named Nancy Mannigoe is condemned to death for the willful murder of the infant son of her white employer Mrs. Gowan Stevens, the former Temple Drake. On the eve of the scheduled execution, Temple tries to save Nancy by telling her father, the governor, of the events preceding the murder in flashback sequences beginning six years earlier, when Temple was a college girl dating Gowan Stevens.

One night, Gowan becomes drunk and takes Temple on a wild drive, crashing the car in the Mississippi backwoods. They take refuge at a house run by a bootlegger named Candy Man, who rapes her. However, the next day, she willingly submits to him and begins to fall in love with him, living with him in a New Orleans brothel. Although Candy is verbally and physically abusive, Temple is devoted to him. His black maid Nancy repeatedly tries to warn Temple of the evil surrounding her, to no avail.

Candy is seemingly killed in a fiery crash while being pursued by police, and with nowhere to turn, Temple reports herself as a hostage and is returned home. She reluctantly marries Gowan and assumes a life of privilege, and the couple have two sons. While on a tour of a prison for narcotics offenders, Temple spots Nancy and frees her so that Nancy can be her maid.

One night, Candy (who survived the crash) reappears and seduces Temple, who cannot resist him. He convinces her to abandon her life and husband and run away with him. Nancy pleads with Temple to rethink her decision and stay, but Temple is determined to take the baby and flee with Candy. Just before Temple is about to leave, she discovers that the baby is dead. Nancy admits to having smothered the baby in a desperate attempt to prevent Temple from leaving.

Though shocked by his daughter's confession, the governor is unable to grant a pardon for Nancy. The next morning, Temple visits Nancy in her cell and they beg for forgiveness from each other. Temple realizes that it is only through Nancy's sacrifice that she has been able to find salvation.

E. Pauline Degenfelder of Worcester Public Schools estimated that thirty percent of the plot takes place in the present time with the remainder in flashback; of that seventy percent flashback material, she attributed forty percent to the original novel, eight percent to the sequel novel, and the remainder to "a transition between Sanctuary and Requiem". The Lee Goodwin/Tommy element is not included. A car accident was used as a plot device for Temple to be discovered as, due to the absence of the aforementioned element, Horace Benbow is not in this version and therefore cannot track her down.

== Cast ==
- Lee Remick as Temple Drake
- Odetta as Nancy Mannigoe
- Yves Montand as Candy Man
- Bradford Dillman as Gowan Stevens
- Harry Townes as Ira Bobbitt
- Howard St. John as Governor Drake
- Jean Carson as Norma
- Reta Shaw as Miss Reba
- Strother Martin as Dog Boy
- William Mims as Lee
- Marge Redmond as Flossie
- Jean Bartel as Swede

== Production ==
Producer Richard D. Zanuck, son of Twentieth Century-Fox head and coproducer Darryl F. Zanuck, sought to combine the William Faulkner novels Sanctuary (1931) and its sequel Requiem for a Nun (1951) into one screenplay as a more commercially viable option than basing the film on one of the books alone. He acquired the film rights to both novels and also spent $75,000 for the rights to the 1933 film The Story of Temple Drake, which was necessary in order to obtain the rights to the original novel.

Director Tony Richardson had previously directed a stage adaptation of Requiem for a Nun in 1957 at the Royal Court Theatre, which was well received. He took it to Broadway in 1959, but it was less successful.

The Zanucks approached Tony Richardson to direct, who hired novelist Doris Lessing to write an initial script. Richardson then discovered that James Poe had been contracted to write a script. Poe used an outline and prologue prepared by Zanuck, who was unable to contact Faulkner.

Horace Benbow, Lee Goodwin, and Tommy do not appear in this version. Additionally, multiple characters were merged together and/or characters replaced roles of other characters. The character of Candy Man is an amalgamation of characters from both source novels: Popeye, Red and Red's brother Pete (Red's brother). Phillips stated that the merging of Pete into Candy Man means the film is made "more tightly into a continuous narrative" from the plots of the two original works, and also that the film does not have to make efforts to establish a new character towards the film's end. In the portions adapted from the first novel, Nancy takes the role originally used by the character Ruby Lamar. Governor Drake is an amalgamation of the governor and Judge Drake (Temple's father) from the original works. Phillips wrote that making the governor Temple's father is "possibly to explain quickly and plausibly her easy access to a man in this position". Degenfelder wrote that the merging of characters results in "ludicrous coincidence" being a feature of the plot.

The novel version of Ira Bobbitt is Gavin Stevens. Gene Phillips of Loyola University of Chicago wrote that the name was likely altered to avoid confusion with Gowan Stevens.

Richardson was drawn to the film project because of the depiction of the 1920s and 1930s United States in the original script. Sanctuary was his US film debut. However, as he disliked the typical editing process for American films of the time, he was unhappy with the completed film.

Filming started July 28, 1960 at 20th Century Fox Studios in Century City.

== Character analysis ==
Even though Temple is formally known as "Mrs. Gowan Stevens", she still calls herself by her maiden name. Gene D. Phillips of Loyola University of Chicago stated that internally she still perceives herself to be "an irresponsible adolescent" and undeserving of a reputation of being a responsible wife. Degenfelder argued that this film does not have a consistent Temple as it tried but failed to reconcile the two different Temples from the novels, and that the resulting character was "weak". In addition, while that film was, according to the reviewer, trying to have a dual nature like with the first film, she felt that Temple is "unconvincing" in the "vamp" role.

Phillips described Nancy as "the focal point of the entire action of the combined stories." This film works in a foreshadowing where Nancy says that Candy Man's still building is not suitable for a child to live in, which plays into the later scene where Nancy kills Temple's child to prevent the baby from being corrupted.

Phillips wrote that Candy's "French accent gives him an exotic quality" attracting Temple to him; the film has the character originate in New Orleans to match the change. According to Degenfelder, the new character name is a reference to his sexual allure and his job illegally transporting alcohol, as "candy" also referred to alcohol. Bosley Crowther of The New York Times stated that Candy Man sounds like Charles Boyer.

== Reception ==
=== Critical response ===
Variety wrote "major liberties have been taken with the novel and its subsequent appendage, “Requiem For a Nun,” to make the frank original often shockingly incisive and appalling in its thorough, penetrating examination of the South’s (and some of humanity’s) dirty underwear, suitable for the screen. The deletions are understandable and often mandatory, but too much has gone out of “Sanctuary.” Not enough of the original flavor and vitality has been retained. Film emerges essentially a dubious “entertainment” in the lighter sense of the word."

In a contemporary review for The New York Times, critic Bosley Crowther wrote:

William Faulkner's novel "Sanctuary," and his sequel to it, "Requiem for a Nun," which together provide, quite a lurid introspection of a jazz:-age Southern girl, have been combined, cut down and altered to such a dumbfounding degree ... that it is hard to recognize the heroine. Indeed, it is hard to recognize her as a credible human being. The saucy young matron ... is more like the superficial subject of true-confessions yarn. And the picture itself is melodrama of the most mechanical and meretricious sort. What has happened, simply, is that the writer of the script, James Poe, has attempted to extract the basic incidents of the two far-from-simple Faulkner yarns without including the essential sordid details that explain and justify the heroine. He has arbitrarily made her a loose woman, a degenerate of a sort, without specifying why she is ... The consequence is a picture that no more reflects or comprehends the evil in the Faulkner stories or the social corruption suggested in them than did the first screen handling of "Sanctuary" in 1933, under the title of "The Story of Temple Drake."

== See also ==
- List of American films of 1961

== Works cited ==
- Degenfelder, E. Pauline (Winter 1976). "The Four Faces of Temple Drake: Faulkner's Sanctuary, Requiem for a Nun, and the Two Film Adaptations". American Quarterly. 28 (5): 544–560. doi:10.2307/2712288. JSTOR 2712288.
- Phillips, Gene D. (Summer 1973). "Faulkner And The Film: The Two Versions Of "Sanctuary"". Literature/Film Quarterly. 1 (2). Salisbury University: 263–273. JSTOR 43795435.
- Phillips, Gene D. (2001). Fiction, Film, and Faulkner: The Art of Adaptation. University of Tennessee Press. ISBN 978-1572331662.
