= Temple Drake =

Fictional character

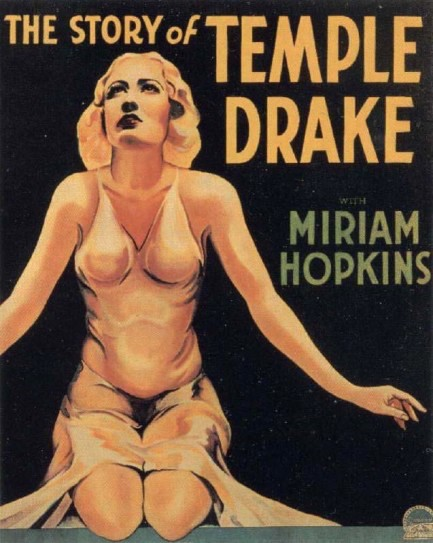
Temple Drake, as portrayed by Miriam Hopkins, in the poster artwork for The Story of Temple Drake (1933)

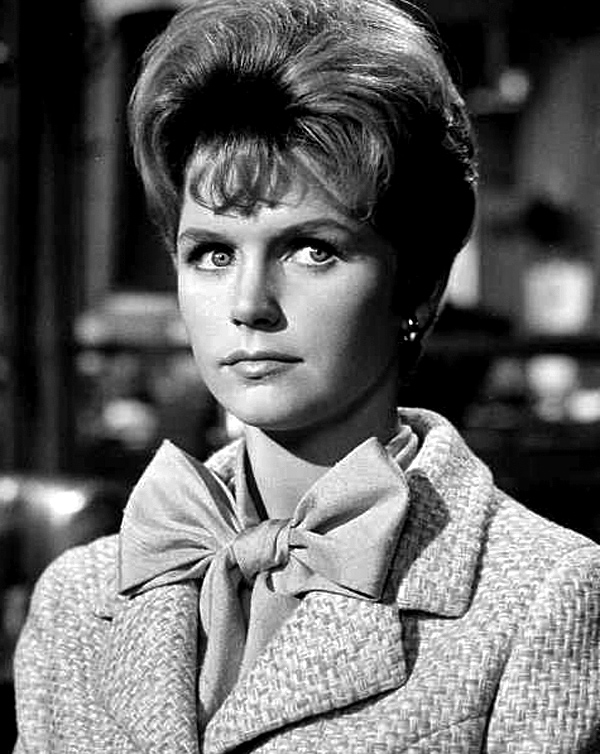
Lee Remick portrays Temple Drake in Sanctuary (1961)

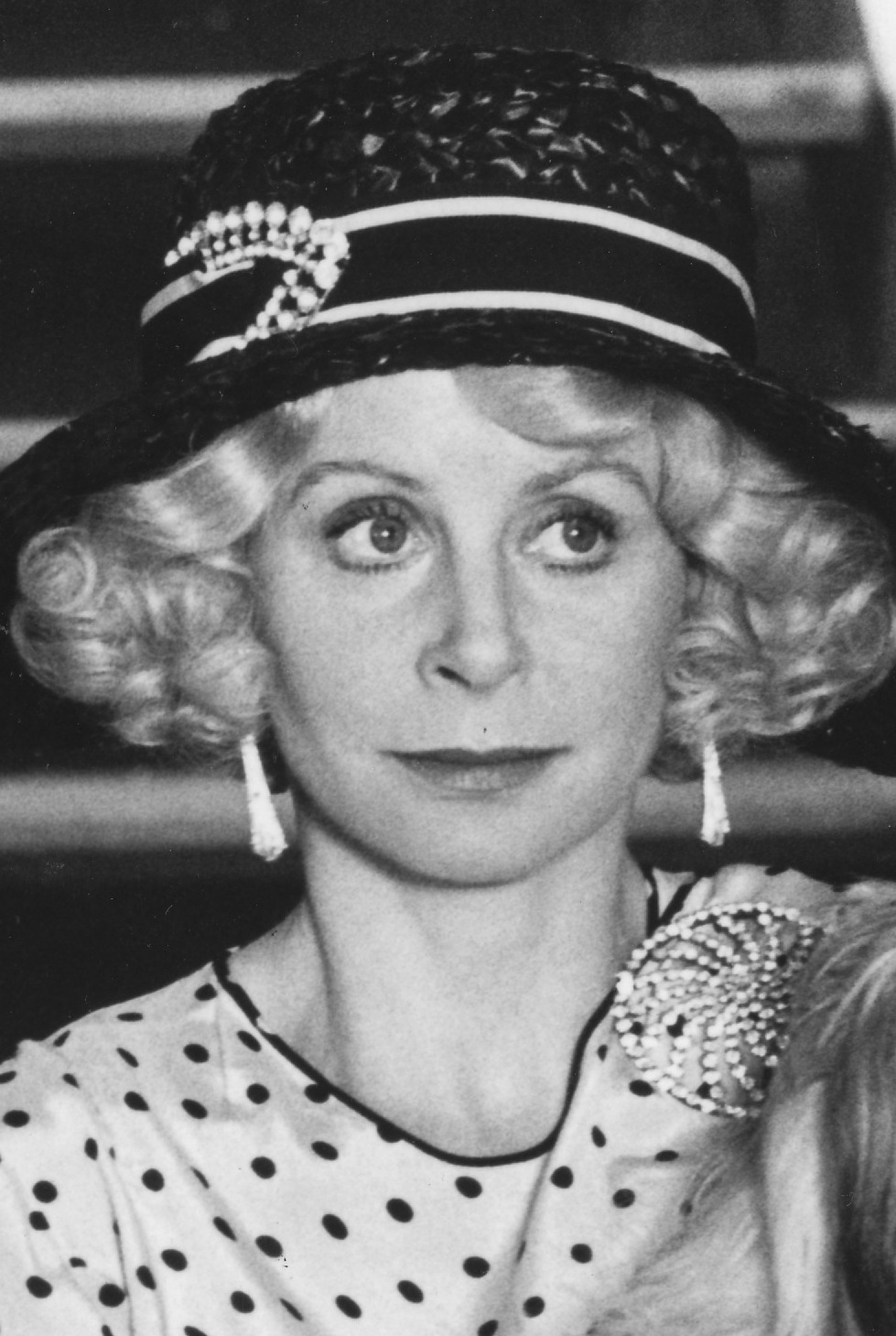
Sarah Miles portrays Temple Drake in Requiem for a Nun (1975)

Temple Drake is a fictional character created by William Faulkner. She appears in the novels Sanctuary (1931) and Requiem for a Nun (1951). The 1962 play Requiem for a Nun and the films The Story of Temple Drake (1933) and Sanctuary (1961) also feature the character. In the two films she is played, respectively, by Miriam Hopkins and Lee Remick. She is played by Sarah Miles in the 1975 TV movie.

== Plot ==
In the first novel, she is a University of Mississippi student who is kidnapped and raped by Popeye, a criminal. Corrupted by her experience in a house of prostitution, she lies in a court, resulting in an innocent man being lynched for a murder. In the second novel, she plans on leaving her family and going back to a criminal lifestyle until her maid kills her child to return her mind to clarity. In the first film, Temple tells the truth on the witness stand and reveals her sordid past. The second film uses elements of both novels, but in that film she does not attend a court hearing.

== Development ==
According to Elisabeth Muhlenfeld of Florida State University, who wrote "Bewildered Witness: Temple Drake in Sanctuary," initially Temple was not the primary character, but this was changed in a revision. E. Pauline Degenfelder of Worcester Public Schools argued that Temple, Popeye, and lawyer Horace Benbow were all main characters even though the work presented itself as mainly being about Temple.

== Characterization ==
Degenfelder wrote that the author mainly gave a "flat" characterization to Temple in the novel. The reviewer added that "Faulkner sees woman as the instrument who instigates and perpetuates this pattern of evil" and that the use of Temple was "attacking the chivalric code of the South".

Degenfelder wrote that her characterization in the first film differs from that of the novel version, and that the film gives her a "dual nature" of a dark and light aspects. Gene D. Phillips of Loyola University of Chicago wrote that she is "better" morally than the novel character. Miriam Hopkins stated : "That Temple Drake, now, there was a thing. Just give me a nice un-standardized wretch like Temple three times a year! Give me the complex ladies, and I'll interpret the daylights out of them." Allan R. Ellenberger, author of Miriam Hopkins: Life and Films of a Hollywood Rebel, stated that of the characters Hopkins played, Temple was a "favorite" of hers.

In Requirem for a Nun and the 1960s Sanctuary, though Temple is formally known as "Mrs. Gowan Stevens", she still calls herself by her maiden name. Phillips stated that internally she still perceives herself to be "an irresponsible adolescent" and undeserving of a reputation of being a responsible wife. In regards to the sequel novel Degenfelder stated that the author formed, in Temple, "an essentially different woman from the same base, without sensing any contradiction." Degenfelder argued that the 1961 film does not have a consistent Temple as it tried but failed to reconcile the two different Temples from the novels, and that the resulting character was "weak". In addition, while that film was, according to the reviewer, trying to have a dual nature like with the first film, she felt that Temple was "unconvincing" in the "vamp" role.

== Analysis ==
Joseph R. Urgo, author of an encyclopedia article on Temple Drake, wrote that the character is an "intersection" of "female agency", "pornographic representation", "the social construction of feminity" and other 20th century "major feminist issues". According to Urgo, audiences in the late 20th century perceived Temple as a "victim of the various social pressures" inflicted on young women while earlier ones blamed her for the sexual assault she undergoes. Muhlenfeld argued that the earlier characterizations of Temple needed re-evaluation. Philip G. Cohen, David Krause, and Karl F. Zender, who wrote an article about Faulkner's works for Sixteen Modern American Authors, argued that compared to "A Measure of Innocence in Sanctuary" by Diane Luce Cox, Muhlenfeld's article "persuades more", and that Muhlenfeld's stance on needing a different viewpoint on Temple agrees with that of Urgo; Muhlenfeld counted Urgo, Cleanth Brooks, Philip M. Weinstein, and Judith Bryant Wittenberg as writers who view Temple in a positive light, while she categorized Calvin S. Brown, Robert L. Mason, Sally R. Page, and Olga Vickery as critics who regard the character as "a symbol of moral decay or evil".

Urgo also argued that Temple's actions differ wildly based on varying "social (and antisocial) situations" that the character lacks a unified "integral being".
