= Requiem for a Nun =

1951 novel by William Faulkner

- First edition
- Author: William Faulkner
- Language: English
- Publisher: Random House
- Publication date: 1951
- Pages: 254

Requiem for a Nun is a work of fiction written by William Faulkner. It is a sequel to Faulkner's early novel Sanctuary, which introduced the characters of Temple Drake, her friend (later husband) Gowan Stevens, and Gowan's uncle Gavin Stevens. The events in Requiem are set in Faulkner's fictional Yoknapatawpha County and Jackson, Mississippi, in November 1937 and March 1938, eight years after the events of Sanctuary. In Requiem, Temple, now married with a child, must learn to deal with her violent, turbulent past as related in Sanctuary.

Requiem, originally published in book form, was later adapted for the stage. It was also a co-source, along with Sanctuary, for the 1961 film Sanctuary.

== Form and theme ==
Like many of Faulkner's works, Requiem experiments with narrative technique; the book is part novel, part play. The main narrative, which is presented in dramatic form, is interspersed with prose sections recounting the history of the fictional Yoknapatawpha County. Each prose section focuses on a specific institution (the courthouse, state house, and jailhouse respectively) that serves as the setting for the following dramatic section of the story.

The major theme of Requiem concerns spiritual redemption for past evil deeds through suffering and the recognition of one's guilt. The word "nun" in the title refers to the character Nancy, a prostitute convicted of murder, and has been understood to carry both its Elizabethan era-slang meaning of a prostitute, and its contemporary meaning of a woman who sacrifices herself to save sinners.

== Synopsis ==
In Jefferson, Mississippi, Nancy Mannigoe, a black nursemaid, who was formerly employed by Temple Drake Stevens (Mrs. Gowan Stevens), is found guilty of the murder of Temple's six-month-old daughter and sentenced to death. Eight years earlier, as described in Sanctuary, Temple fell into the hands of a gang of violent bootleggers and was raped and imprisoned in a brothel through the drunken irresponsibility of her escort, Gowan Stevens. Afterwards, Gowan married Temple out of a sense of honor and responsibility, and they had two children. The Stevenses have resumed their place in the respectable, well-to-do society of the county, and appear to have a normal life, but their marriage is strained by Temple's past and the unspoken idea that on some level, she enjoyed or got some excitement from her brothel experience. Temple hired Nancy, a black drug addict and occasional prostitute, in order to have someone to talk to who understood her.

Gowan's uncle Gavin Stevens, who is serving as Nancy's defense attorney, believes Temple is withholding information about her daughter's death, and confronts Temple outside the presence of her husband Gowan. Temple indicates that there were reasons why Nancy killed the baby, and that Nancy was neither mentally ill nor malicious, but avoids revealing any more information, instead going on an extended trip to California.

Several months later, a week before Nancy's scheduled execution, Temple returns to Jefferson and contacts Gavin. After drugging her husband Gowan with a sleeping pill so he will not overhear the conversation, Temple confesses to Gavin that although Nancy did kill the baby, Temple herself also had a hand in the killing and wants to stop Nancy's execution. Gavin urges her to appeal directly to the Governor of Mississippi, although it may be too late to save Nancy. Unbeknownst to Temple or Gavin, Gowan has overheard the entire conversation.

The day before Nancy's execution, Temple goes to the state capital, Jackson, Mississippi, and confesses to the governor that prior to her baby's killing, she had planned to abandon her husband and family and run away with Pete, the younger brother of her former lover Red. As described in Sanctuary, Temple as a 17-year-old virgin was brutally raped with a corncob by the impotent gangster Popeye, who then forced her repeatedly to have sex with Red while he watched. Temple began to fall in love with Red, causing the jealous Popeye to murder him. After being rescued, Temple falsely accused another man, Goodwin, of being her rapist, causing Goodwin to be lynched by an angry mob. Before Red's murder, Temple had written him explicit love letters, which were later found by his brother Pete, who used them to blackmail Temple. Temple found herself attracted to Pete and planned not only to give him a large sum of money, but also to elope with him. Upon learning that Temple was about to leave with Pete, Nancy attempted to stop her by smothering her baby daughter, an act that will also cost Nancy her own life as well, which Nancy is willing to sacrifice.

The governor has already refused to grant clemency for Nancy. Although Temple believes she is confessing to the governor, he has left his office and Temple's husband Gowan is sitting in his chair, which Temple realizes only after she has finished telling her story. Gowan tells Temple he too is sorry for his part in triggering the chain of events that happened eight years ago, but that the past is unchangeable and over. Temple worries about the salvation of her own soul.

On the morning of Nancy's execution, Temple and Gavin visit her in her prison cell. Temple explains that she wanted to confess to the governor that Nancy was not solely responsible for the baby's death, and that she, Temple, caused the death eight years ago by going on the date with Gowan that led to her rape and the subsequent chain of events. Now Nancy must die for smothering the baby while Temple must live with the consequences of her own actions. Nancy tells Temple to trust in God and extols the virtues of suffering.

== Development ==
Faulkner stated that initially he wished to end the plot at the end of Sanctuary but he decided that, in E. Pauline Degenfelder's words, "Temple's reinterpretation would be dramatic and worthwhile." Degenfelder, from Worcester Public Schools, believes that he may have gotten inspiration for the sequel from The Story of Temple Drake due to common elements between the two.

== Characterization ==
Degenfelder stated that the author formed, in Temple, "an essentially different woman from the same base, without sensing any contradiction." According to the reviewer, this differs from the "flat" characterization of Temple in the novel.

Though Temple, in this novel, is formally known as "Mrs. Gowan Stevens", she still calls herself by her maiden name. Gene D. Phillips stated that internally she still perceives herself to be "an irresponsible adolescent" and undeserving of a reputation of being a responsible wife.

== Reception ==
At the time of publication, Requiem received mixed reviews. Malcolm Cowley in the New York Herald Tribune wrote that Requiem was "a drama conceived on a level of moral consciousness" that made it "genuinely tragic", and "in that respect it is vastly superior to Sanctuary, where the only morality was in the dim background of the author's mind." Some critics were also intrigued or impressed by Requiem's experimental form combining novel and drama. However, Faulkner's writing style was criticized as clumsy or tedious, particularly in the dramatic sections, where the action was largely narrated rather than shown. Critics also found some aspects of the story to be implausible, unreal, and out of step with contemporary attitudes, particularly the characterization of Nancy as self-sacrificing and the motivation for her killing of Temple's baby.

In later decades, the book was not considered marketable by publishers and for a time was not available in a paperback or other inexpensive edition. Its ongoing significance was primarily as a sequel to Faulkner's more highly regarded novel, Sanctuary.

== "The past" ==
Requiem for a Nun is the source of one of Faulkner's best-known lines, "The past is never dead. It's not even past."

This line is often paraphrased, as it was in 2008 by then-Senator Barack Obama in his speech "A More Perfect Union".

In 2012, Faulkner Literary Rights LLC filed a copyright infringement lawsuit against Sony Pictures Classics over a scene in the film Midnight in Paris, in which a time-traveling character says, "The past is not dead! Actually, it's not even past. You know who said that? Faulkner. And he was right. And I met him, too. I ran into him at a dinner party." In 2013, the judge dismissed Faulkner Literary Rights LLC's claim, ruling that the use of the quote in the film was de minimis and constituted "fair use".

== Adaptations ==
The novel was dramatized for the theater in 1956 by Albert Camus, entitled Requiem pour une nonne. Camus also wrote the preface to the 1957 French translation of the novel by Maurice Coindreau.

The English Stage Company at the Royal Court Theatre presented the play in London on November 27, 1957. The Broadway production opened at the John Golden Theatre on January 30, 1959. Both productions were directed by Tony Richardson. William Faulkner adapted the play from his own novel.

The Guthrie Theater in Minneapolis, Minnesota presented the play as part of its 1982-83 season. It was directed by Liviu Ciulei

Cesear's Forum, a minimalist theatre company, presented the play in a 1993 Chicago production.

The novel was a co-source for the 1961 film Sanctuary. directed by Tony Richardson. An earlier 1933 film version (Faulkner worked on the screenplay), was entitled The Story of Temple Drake.

A West German television film Requiem für eine Nonne was released in 1965.

In 1975 a television film adaptation of Requiem for a Nun was released with Sarah Miles, Mary Alice and Sam Edwards. It was based on the play by Ruth Ford.

Oscar Strasnoy's opera Requiem was first produced at the Teatro Colón in Buenos Aires, 2014.
