= Sanctuary (Faulkner novel) =

1931 novel by William Faulkner

- First edition cover. An alternate cover features shades of brown instead of blue.
- Author: William Faulkner
- Cover artist: Arthur Hawkins Jr.
- Language: English
- Genre: Southern Gothic
- Publisher: Jonathan Cape and Harrison Smith
- Publication date: February 9, 1931
- Publication place: United States
- Media type: Print (hardback & paperback)
- Preceded by: As I Lay Dying
- Followed by: Light in August

Sanctuary is a 1931 Southern Gothic novel by American author William Faulkner about the rape and abduction of an upper-class Mississippi college girl, Temple Drake, during the Prohibition era. The novel was Faulkner's commercial and critical breakthrough and established his literary reputation, but was controversial given its themes. It is said Faulkner claimed it was a "potboiler", written purely for profit, but this has been debated by scholars and Faulkner's own friends.

The novel provided the basis for the films The Story of Temple Drake (1933) and Sanctuary (1961). It also inspired the novel No Orchids for Miss Blandish as well as the film of the same title and The Grissom Gang, which derived from No Orchids for Miss Blandish. The story of the novel can also be found in the 2007 film Cargo 200.

Faulkner later wrote Requiem for a Nun (1951) as a sequel to Sanctuary.

== Plot summary ==
The novel is set in Faulkner's fictional Yoknapatawpha County, Mississippi and takes place in May and June 1929.

In May 1929, Horace Benbow, a lawyer frustrated with his life and family, suddenly leaves his home in Kinston, Mississippi, and hitchhikes his way back to Jefferson, his hometown in Yoknapatawpha County. There, his widowed sister, Narcissa Sartoris, lives with her son and her late husband's great-aunt, Miss Jenny. On the way to Jefferson, he stops for a drink of water near the "Old Frenchman" homestead, which is occupied by the bootlegger Lee Goodwin. Benbow encounters a sinister man called Popeye, an associate of Goodwin, who brings him to the decrepit mansion where he meets Goodwin and the strange people who live there with him. Later that night, Benbow catches a ride from Goodwin's place into Jefferson. He argues with his sister and Miss Jenny about leaving his wife, and meets Gowan Stevens, a local bachelor who recently has been courting Narcissa. That night, Benbow moves back into his parents' house, which has been sitting vacant for years.

After meeting Benbow, Gowan leaves to go to a dance in Oxford that same night. Gowan has returned to Jefferson after graduating from the University of Virginia, where he "learned to drink like a gentleman." He is from a wealthy family and prides himself on having adopted the worldview of the Virginia aristocracy. His date that night is Temple Drake, a student at the University of Mississippi ("Ole Miss"), who has a reputation of being a "fast girl." Temple also comes from a wealthy Mississippi family and is the daughter of a powerful judge. While they are out, Gowan and Temple make plans to meet the next morning to travel with her classmates to Starkville for a baseball game. But, after taking Temple home after the dance, Gowan learns from some locals where he can find moonshine and spends the night drinking heavily. He passes out in his car at the train station where he is supposed to have a rendezvous with Temple the next morning.

Gowan wakes the next morning to discover that he's missed Temple's train. He speeds to the next town to intercept it, meeting Temple in Taylor, and persuading her to ride with him to Starkville—a violation of the university's rules for young women. On the way, Gowan, still drunk, and an obvious alcoholic, decides to stop at the Goodwin place to find more moonshine. He crashes his car into a tree that Popeye had felled across the drive in case of a police raid. Popeye and Tommy, a good-natured "halfwit" who works for Goodwin, happen to be nearby when the accident happens, and take Temple and Gowan back to the old mansion. Temple is terrified, both by Gowan's behavior and by the strange people and circumstances into which he has brought her. Upon arriving at the Goodwin place, she meets Goodwin's common-law wife, Ruby, who advises her to leave before nightfall. Gowan is given more liquor to drink.

After nightfall, Goodwin returns home and is upset to find Gowan and Temple staying there. All the men continue to drink; Gowan and Van, a member of Goodwin's bootlegging crew, argue and provoke each other. Van makes crude advances toward Temple, rousing in the drunken Gowan a sense that he needs to protect Temple's honor. By this point, Temple is deeply distressed. She is apprehensive of the bootleggers, truant from school, and afraid of being discovered for fear of her family's disapproval. She is condescending, which angers Popeye, and tries to hold court in the room where the men are drinking despite Ruby's advice that she stay away from them. After being harassed, Temple finds a bedroom in which to hide. Gowan and Van finally fight, and Gowan is knocked out. The other men carry him into the room where Temple is cowering and throw him on the bed. Ruby and Tommy keep the men, including Popeye, from bothering Temple. Finally, the men leave on a whiskey run in the middle of the night.

The next morning, Gowan wakes and silently leaves the house, abandoning Temple. Tommy, who dislikes and fears Goodwin's other men, hides Temple in a corn crib in the barn. But Popeye, who has obviously been devising a scheme, soon discovers them there. He murders Tommy with a gunshot to the back of the head and then proceeds to rape Temple with a corncob. Afterward, he puts her in his car and drives to Memphis, Tennessee, where he has connections in the criminal underworld.

Meanwhile, Goodwin discovers Tommy's body at his barn. When the police arrive on the scene, they assume Goodwin committed the crime and arrest him. Goodwin knows of Popeye's guilt, but doesn't implicate him out of fear of retaliation. In Jefferson, Goodwin is jailed, and Benbow takes up his legal defense, even though he knows that Goodwin cannot pay him. Benbow tries to let Ruby and her sickly infant child stay with him in the house in Jefferson, but Narcissa, as half-owner, refuses because of the Goodwin family's reputation. In the end, Benbow has no choice but to put Ruby and her son in a room at a local hotel.

Benbow tries unsuccessfully to get Goodwin to tell the court about Popeye. He soon finds out about Temple and her presence at Goodwin's place when Tommy was murdered; he heads to Ole Miss to look for her. He discovers that she has left the school. On the train back to Jefferson, he runs into an unctuous state senator named Clarence Snopes, who says that the newspaper is claiming that Temple has been "sent up north" by her father. In reality, Temple is living in a room in a Memphis bawdy house owned by Miss Reba, an asthmatic, widowed madam, who thinks highly of Popeye and is happy that he's finally chosen a paramour. Popeye keeps Temple at the brothel for use as a sex slave. However, because he is impotent, he brings along Red, a young gangster, and forces Temple and him to have sex while he watches.

When Benbow returns from Oxford, he learns that the owner of the hotel has kicked out Ruby and her child. After Narcissa again refuses to give them shelter, Benbow finds a place outside of town for Ruby to stay. Meanwhile, Snopes visits Miss Reba's brothel and discovers that Temple is living there. Snopes realizes that this information might be valuable to both Benbow and Temple's father. After Benbow agrees to pay Snopes for the information, Snopes divulges Temple's whereabouts in Memphis. Benbow immediately heads there and convinces Miss Reba to let him talk to Temple. Miss Reba is sympathetic to the plight of Goodwin and his family, but she still admires and respects Popeye. Temple tells Benbow the story of her rape at Popeye's hands. Benbow, shaken, returns to Jefferson. Upon his return home, he reflects on Temple and is reminded of his stepdaughter, Little Belle. He looks at a picture of Little Belle and becomes ill, disturbed by images of her naked, conflated with images from what he has heard from Temple about her night at the old mansion.

At this point, Temple has become corrupted thoroughly by life in the brothel. After bribing Miss Reba's servant to let her leave the house, she runs into Popeye, who is waiting outside in his car. He takes Temple to a roadhouse called The Grotto, intending to settle whether she will permanently stay with Popeye or Red. At the club, Temple drinks heavily and tries to have furtive sex with Red in a back room, but he spurns her advances for the moment. Two of Popeye's friends frog-march her out of the club and drive her back to Miss Reba. Popeye kills Red, which turns Miss Reba against him. She tells some of her friends what has happened, hoping he will be captured and executed for the murder.

Narcissa visits the District Attorney and reveals she wants Benbow to lose the case as soon as possible, so that he will cease his involvement with the Goodwins. After writing to his wife to ask for a divorce, Benbow tries to get back in touch with Temple through Miss Reba, who tells him that both she and Popeye are gone. At around this time, Goodwin's trial begins in Jefferson. On the second day of the trial, Temple makes a surprise appearance and takes the stand, giving false testimony that it was Goodwin, not Popeye, who had raped and brutalized her, and that Goodwin had shot Tommy dead. The district attorney also presents the stained corncob used in Temple's rape as evidence.

The jury finds Goodwin guilty after only eight minutes of deliberation. Benbow, devastated, is taken back to Narcissa's house. After wandering from the house that evening, he finds that Goodwin has been lynched by the townsfolk with his body set ablaze. Benbow is recognized in the crowd, which threatens to lynch him, too. The next day, a defeated Benbow returns home to his wife. Ironically, on his way to Pensacola, Florida to visit his mother, Popeye is arrested and hanged for a crime he never committed. Temple and her father make a final appearance in the Jardin du Luxembourg, having found sanctuary in Paris.

== Characters ==
=== Major characters ===
- Popeye – Criminal with an unsavory past, involved in the Goodwin bootlegging operation. Also has unspecified ties to the Memphis criminal underworld. His mother had syphilis when he was conceived. He is impotent and has various other physical afflictions. He rapes Temple with a corncob and then takes her to Memphis and keeps her in a room at Miss Reba's brothel.
- Horace Benbow – Lawyer who represents Mr. Goodwin in the trial for Tommy's murder. He is well-meaning and intelligent, but proves ineffective and powerless in the face of a troubled marriage and Temple's false testimony.
  - He does not appear in the 1961 film adaptation.
- Tommy – "Halfwit" member of the Goodwin bootlegging crew. He is murdered by Popeye while he is trying to protect Temple.
  - He does not appear in the 1961 film adaptation.
- Lee Goodwin – Bootlegger who is accused of Tommy's murder, for which he is tried, wrongly convicted, and lynched.
  - He does not appear in the 1961 film adaptation.
- Ruby Lamar – Goodwin's common-law wife and mother of his child. She is shunned and reviled by most of the cityfolk for "living in sin" with Goodwin.
  - In the portions of the 1961 Sanctuary adapted from the first novel, Nancy Mannigoe (played by Odetta), who in the novels appears only in the Requiem for a Nun, takes the role originally used by Ruby.
- Temple Drake – Student at University of Mississippi, daughter of a prestigious judge, a vapid "fast girl" who gets in over her head when she ends up meeting Popeye and the Goodwin bootleggers. She is raped and kidnapped by Popeye. At the trial, she lies and says Lee Goodwin killed Tommy.
  - Degenfelder wrote that the author mainly gave a "flat" characterization to Temple in the novel. The reviewer added that "Faulkner sees woman as the instrument who instigates and perpetuates this pattern of evil" and that the use of Temple was "attacking the chivalric code of the South".
- Gowan Stevens – Vain, self-important, alcoholic man who takes Temple to the Goodwin house, where he hopes to buy some whisky. He gets drunk, gets beaten up by Van, and passes out. He leaves the house by himself the next morning, abandoning Temple, who then falls into Popeye's hands.
- Miss Reba – Owns a Memphis brothel where Temple lives under Popeye's control; she thinks highly of Popeye until he brings Red in as a "stud", which shocks and scandalizes her.

=== Minor characters ===
- "Pap" – Probably Goodwin's father; a blind and deafmute old man who lives at the Goodwin place.
- Van – A young tough who works for Goodwin
- Red – A Memphis criminal who has intercourse with Temple, at Popeye's request, so that Popeye (who is impotent) can watch; Popeye later tires of this arrangement and murders Red
- Minnie – Miss Reba's maidservant
- Narcissa Benbow – Horace's younger sister (the widow of Bayard Sartoris)
- Miss Jenny – Narcissa's deceased husband's great-aunt, who lives with Narcissa and young Bory
- Benbow Sartoris, aka "Bory" – Narcissa's ten-year-old son
- Little Belle – Horace Benbow's stepdaughter
- Miss Lorraine, Miss Myrtle – friends of Miss Reba

== Development ==
Faulkner stated that he wrote the novel for financial gain and was not motivated by internal passion. He did the first draft in a three-week period in 1929 and later made a new version with toned-down elements when the publisher expressed reluctance to publish the original.

According to Muhlenfeld, initially Temple was not the primary character, but this was changed in a revision. E. Pauline Degenfelder of Worcester Public Schools argued that Temple, Popeye, and Horace were all main characters even though the work presented itself as mainly being about Temple.

== Reception ==
Most reviews described the book as horrific and said that Faulkner was a very talented writer. Some critics also felt that he should write something pleasant for a change.

In June 1932, Sanctuary was banned from importation to Canada by the Canadian Department of National Revenue.

Faulkner once headed a troop of Boy Scouts but the administrators removed him from his position after the release of the book.

Gene D. Phillips of Loyola University of Chicago wrote that because audiences were preoccupied with lurid scenes instead of its moral philosophy, the book was a "best seller for all of the wrong reasons".

Time commented that "A favorite question on Shakespeare examinations is 'Distinguish between horror and terror.' Sanctuary is both. The horrors of any ghost story pale beside the ghastly realism of this chronicle. [...] When you have read the book you will see what Author Faulkner thinks of the inviolability of sanctuary. The intended hero is the decent, ineffectual lawyer. But all heroism is swamped by the massed villainy that weighs down these pages. Outspoken to an almost medical degree, Sanctuary should be let alone by the censors because no one but a pathological reader will be sadistically aroused."

== Editions ==
On February 9, 1931, Sanctuary was published by Jonathan Cape and Harrison Smith. In 1932, a cheaper hardcover edition was published by Modern Library. This second edition is notable in that it contains an introduction by Faulkner explaining his intentions in writing the book and a brief history of its inception. In it, Faulkner explains that he wished to make money by writing a sensational book. His previous books were not quite as successful as he had hoped. However, after submitting the manuscript in 1929, his publisher explained that they would both be sent to prison if the story was ever published. Faulkner forgot about the manuscript. Two years later, Faulkner, surprised, received the galley copies and promptly decided to rewrite the manuscript as he was not satisfied with it. He thought that it might sell 10,000 copies. This version was published in 1931. All later editions featured the text from the 1931/32 editions; however, a plethora of typographical errors existed, some of which were corrected in the later editions.

In 1958, a new edition was published by Random House with the co-operation of Faulkner, the entire text was reset and errors corrected. The copyright year is listed as "1931, 1958" in this edition. In 1981, Random House published another edition titled Sanctuary: The Original Text, edited by Noel Polk. This edition features the text of Faulkner's original manuscript as submitted in 1929, with errors corrected.

In 1993, another version was published by Vintage Books titled Sanctuary: The Corrected Text which corrects additional errors. This is the only edition currently in print, though reprints of it bear the original novel's title, simply Sanctuary.

== Analysis ==
Various observers had their own interpretations on the themes of the novel. André Malraux characterized it as, in the words of E. Pauline Degenfelder of Worcester Public Schools, "a detective story with overtones of Greek tragedy". Cleanth Brooks believed that the work was a "mood piece" on, in Degenfelder's words, "the discovery of evil".

Doreen Fowler, author of "Reading for the "Other Side": Beloved and Requiem for a Nun," wrote that "it could be argued that the title" refers to the main character's sexual organs, which are attacked by Popeye.

== Adaptations ==
In 1933, Sanctuary was adapted into the Pre-Code film The Story of Temple Drake starring Miriam Hopkins, with the rapist character "Popeye" renamed "Trigger" for copyright reasons. According to film historian William K. Everson, the film was largely responsible for the Motion Picture Production Code crackdown on risque and controversial subject matter.

The novel was later a co-source, with its sequel Requiem for a Nun (1951), for the 1961 film Sanctuary, starring Lee Remick as Temple and Yves Montand as her rapist, now renamed "Candy Man".

Faulkner stated that initially he wished to end the plot at the end of Sanctuary but he decided that, in Degenfelder's words, "Temple's reinterpretation would be dramatic and worthwhile." Degenfelder believes that he may have gotten inspiration for the sequel from The Story of Temple Drake due to common elements between the two.

Phillips wrote that due to the difficulties of adapting the novel into a film with the same spirit that would attract major audiences, "no film so far has retold Faulkner's story of Temple Drake with quite the impact of the original. And at this point it seems safe to predict that none ever will."

== Legacy ==
Phillips wrote that the novel "earned him the reputation of being a sordid Gothic writer that he still holds in the popular mind."

Phillips wrote that "It is a matter of record that James Hadley Chase's lurid novel No Orchids for Miss Blandish was heavily indebted to Sanctuary for its plot line." According to Phillips, that means both film adaptations, No Orchids for Miss Blandish and The Grissom Gang, received inspiration from Sanctuary.

A Russian film with a similar plot – Cargo 200, set in 1984 Russia – was made in 2007.

Preceded by As I Lay Dying	Novels set in Yoknapatawpha County	Succeeded by Light in August
