= Light in August =

1932 novel by William Faulkner

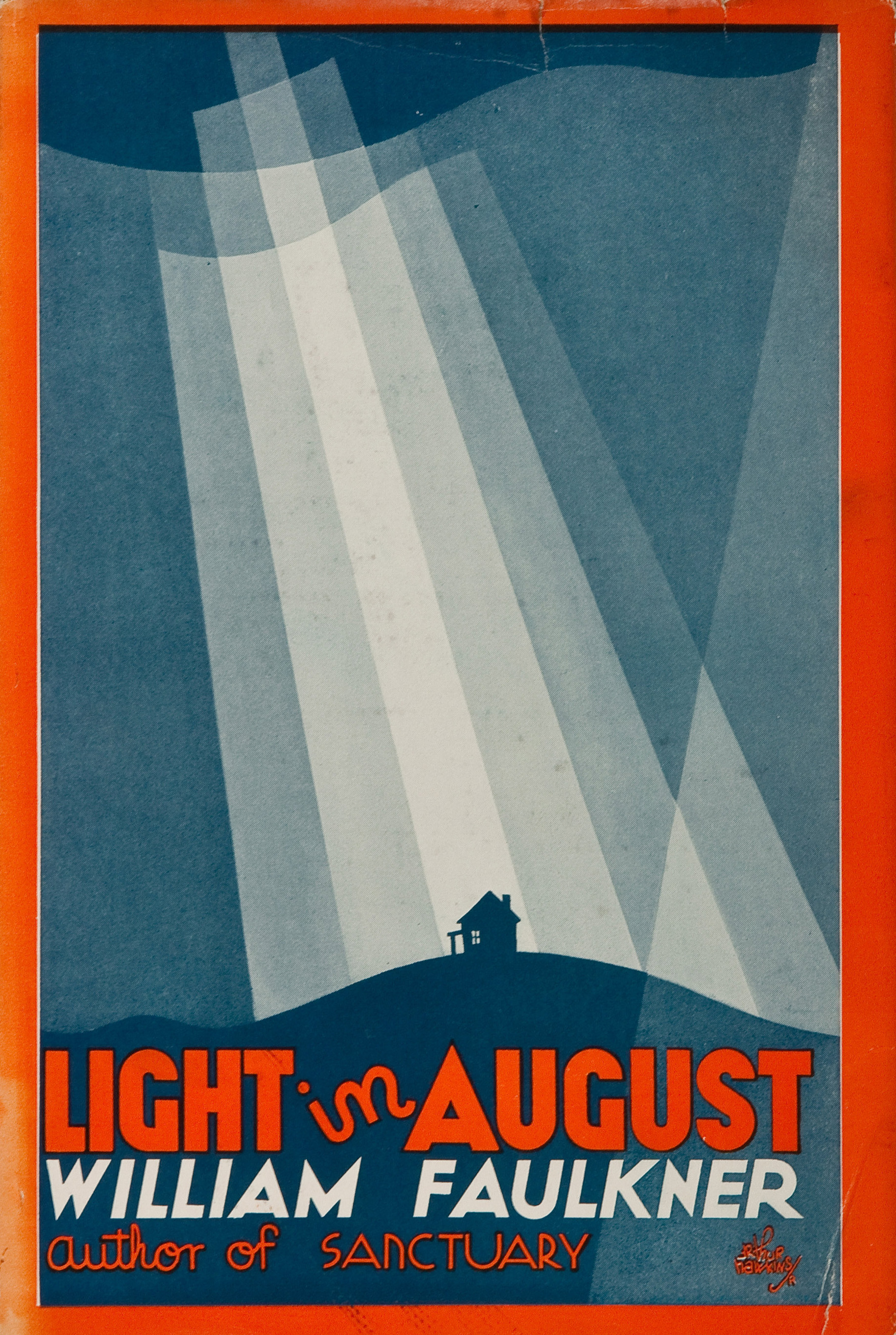
- First edition
- Author: William Faulkner
- Language: English
- Genre: Southern Gothic, modernist
- Publisher: Smith & Haas
- Publication date: 1932
- Pages: 480
- Dewey Decimal: 813.52
- Preceded by: Sanctuary
- Followed by: Absalom, Absalom!

Light in August is a 1932 novel by American author William Faulkner. It belongs to the Southern Gothic and modernist literary genres.

Set in the author's present day, the interwar period, the novel centers on two strangers, a pregnant white woman and a man who passes as white but who believes himself to be of mixed ethnicity. In a series of flashbacks, the story reveals how these two people are connected to another man who has deeply impacted both their lives.

In a nonlinear, contrapuntal modernist narrative style that draws from Christian allegory and oral storytelling, Faulkner explores themes of race, sex, class, and religion in the American South. By focusing on characters who are misfits, outcasts, or otherwise marginalized in their community, he portrays the clash of alienated individuals against a Puritanical, prejudiced rural society. Early reception of the novel was mixed, with some reviewers critical of Faulkner's style and subject matter. However, over time, the novel has come to be considered one of the most important literary works by Faulkner and one of the best English-language novels of the 20th century.

== Plot ==
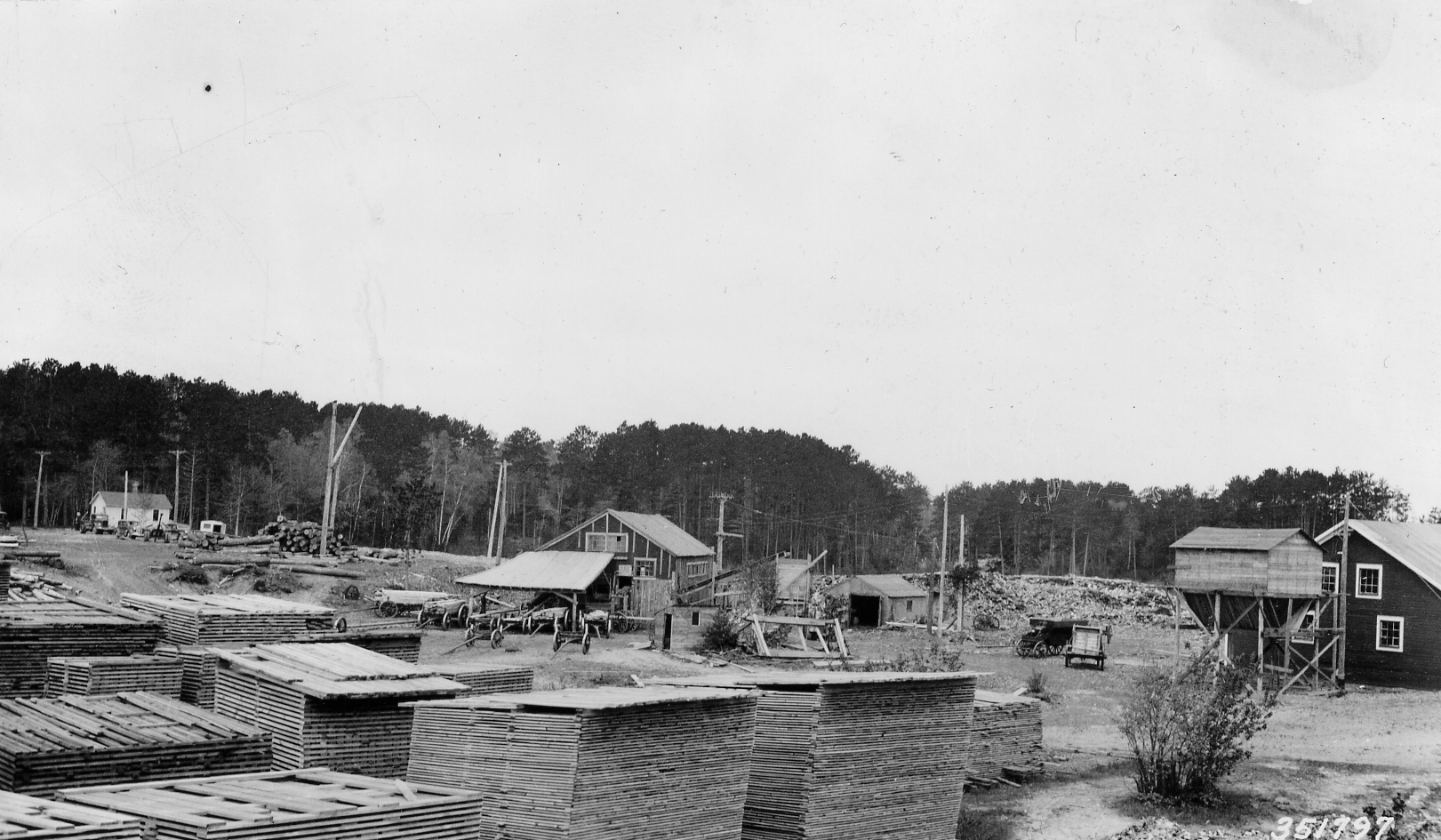
Photograph of a real planing mill in the 1930s, similar to the one depicted in the novel.

The novel is set in the American South in the 1930s, during the time of Prohibition and Jim Crow laws that legalized racial segregation in the South. It begins with the journey of Lena Grove, a young pregnant white woman from Doane's Mill, Alabama, who is trying to find Lucas Burch, the father of her unborn child. He has been fired from his job in Doane's Mill and moved to Mississippi, promising to send word to her when he has a new job. Not hearing from Burch and harassed by her older brother for her illegitimate pregnancy, Lena walks and hitchhikes to Jefferson, Mississippi, a town in Faulkner's fictional Yoknapatawpha County. There she expects to find Lucas working at another planing mill, ready to marry her. Those who help her along her four-week trek are skeptical that Lucas Burch will be found, or that he will keep his promise when she catches up with him. When she arrives in Jefferson, Lucas is there, but he has changed his name to Joe Brown. Looking for Lucas, sweet, trusting Lena meets shy, mild-mannered Byron Bunch, who falls in love with Lena but feels honor-bound to help her find Joe Brown. Thoughtful and quietly religious, Byron is superior to Brown in every way, but his shyness prevents him from revealing his feelings to Lena.

The novel then switches to the second plot strand, the story of Lucas Burch/Joe Brown's partner Joe Christmas. The surly, psychopathic Christmas has been on the run for years, ever since at least injuring, perhaps even killing his strict Presbyterian adopted father. Although he has light skin, Christmas suspects that he is of African American ancestry. Consumed with rage, he is a bitter outcast who wanders between black and white society, constantly provoking fights with blacks and whites alike. Christmas comes to Jefferson three years prior to the central events of the novel and gets a job at the mill where Byron, and later Joe Brown, work.

The job at the mill is a cover for Christmas's bootlegging operation, which is illegal under Prohibition. He has a sexual relationship with Joanna Burden, an older woman who descended from a formerly powerful abolitionist family whom the town despises as carpetbaggers. Though their relationship is passionate at first, Joanna begins menopause and turns to religion, which frustrates and angers Christmas. At the end of her relationship with Christmas, Joanna tries to force him, at gunpoint, to kneel and pray. Joanna is murdered soon after: her throat is slit and she is nearly decapitated.

The novel leaves readers uncertain whether Joe Christmas or Joe Brown is the murderer. Brown is Christmas' business partner in bootlegging and is leaving Joanna's burning house when a passing farmer stops to investigate and pull Joanna's body from the fire. The sheriff at first suspects Joe Brown, but initiates a manhunt for Christmas after Brown claims that Christmas is black. The manhunt is fruitless until Christmas arrives undisguised in Mottstown, a neighboring town; he is on his way back to Jefferson, no longer running. In Mottstown, he is arrested and jailed, then moved to Jefferson. His grandparents arrive in town and visit Gail Hightower, the disgraced former minister of the town and friend of Byron Bunch. Bunch tries to convince Hightower to give the imprisoned Joe Christmas an alibi, but Hightower initially refuses. Though his grandfather wants Christmas lynched, his grandmother visits him in the Jefferson jail and advises him to seek help from Hightower. As police escort him to the local court, Christmas breaks free and runs to Hightower's house. A childishly cruel white vigilante, Percy Grimm, follows him there and, over Hightower's protest, shoots and castrates Christmas. Having redeemed himself at last, Hightower is then depicted as falling into a deathlike swoon, his whole life flashing before his eyes, including the past adventures of his Confederate grandfather, who was killed while stealing chickens from a farmer's shed.

Before Christmas' escape attempt, Hightower delivers Lena's child in the cabin where Brown and Christmas had been staying before the murder, and Byron arranges for Brown/Burch to come and see her. Brown deserts Lena once again, but Byron follows him and challenges him to a fight. Brown beats the braver, smaller Byron, then skillfully hops a moving train and disappears. At the end of the story, an anonymous man is talking to his wife about two strangers he picked up on a trip to Tennessee, recounting that the woman had a child and the man was not the father. This was Lena and Byron, who were conducting a half-hearted search for Brown, and they are eventually dropped off in Tennessee.

== Characters ==
=== Major characters ===
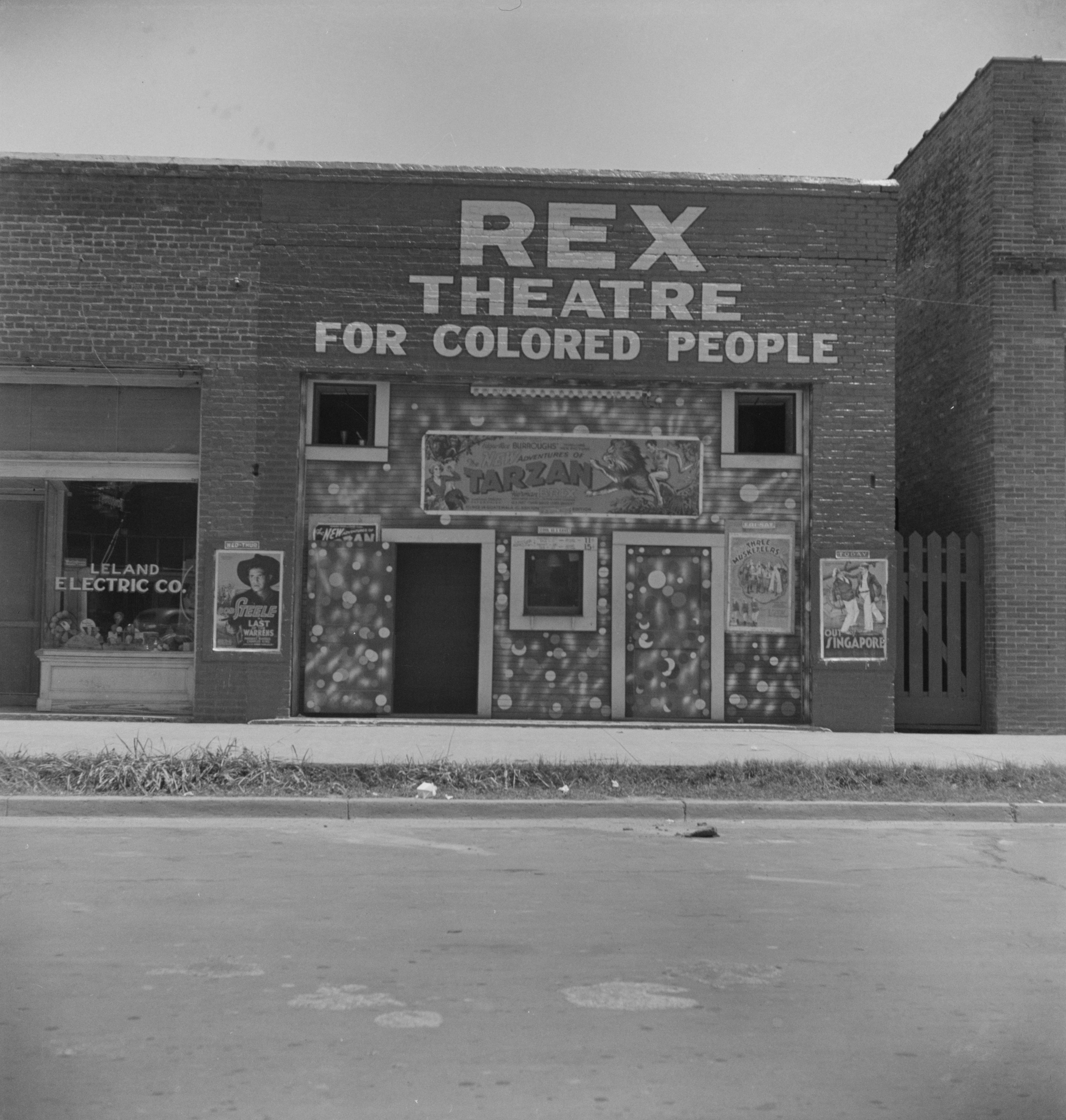
Segregated movie theater in Leland, Mississippi, in 1937, a result of de jure segregation of black and white people in the South

- Lena Grove – a young pregnant woman from Alabama who has traveled to Jefferson while looking for Lucas Burch, the father of her unborn child.
- Byron Bunch – a bachelor who works at the planing mill in Jefferson, who meets and falls in love with Lena when she arrives in town. She has been told that a man named Bunch works at the mill and assumes it is Lucas Burch, because the name sounds similar.
- Gail Hightower – the former minister of Jefferson, forced to retire after his wife was discovered to be having an affair in Memphis and committed suicide. He is a friend and mentor to Byron.
- Lucas Burch/Joe Brown – the young man who fathered Lena's child in Alabama and ran away when she told him she was pregnant. He has been living in Jefferson with Joe Christmas in a cabin on Joanna Burden's property under the name Joe Brown and working with Christmas and Byron at the planing mill. He is also a bootlegger.
- Joe Christmas – a man who came to Jefferson three years prior to the events in the novel. He lives in a cabin on the property of Joanna Burden and has a secret sexual relationship with her. Although he has light skin and is an orphan with no knowledge of his family background, he believes that one of his parents is of African-American ancestry, and this secret has caused him to be a habitual wanderer. He is employed at the planing mill until he begins to make a profit as a bootlegger.
- Joanna Burden – the sole survivor in Jefferson of a family of abolitionists from New England who came to Jefferson after the Civil War. She is unmarried, lives alone in a manor house outside of Jefferson, and is secretly engaged in a sexual relationship with Joe Christmas. She is murdered, presumably by Christmas, at the start of the novel, and her house is burned down.

=== Secondary characters ===
- Eupheus "Doc" Hines – the grandfather of Joe Christmas. He hates Christmas and gives him away to an orphanage when he is born, staying on as a janitor there in order to monitor the boy. Later, when he hears that Christmas is being held on suspicion of murdering Joanna Burden, he travels to Jefferson with his wife and begins to incite a lynch mob to kill Christmas.
- Mrs. Hines – the grandmother of Joe Christmas. She has never seen Christmas after the night of his birth and travels to Jefferson to ensure that her husband does not successfully have him lynched, because she wants to see him again once more before he is tried for murder.
- Milly Hines – the teenage mother of Joe Christmas. She conceives after a tryst with a member of a traveling circus, whom she claims is Mexican. She dies in childbirth after Eupheus Hines refuses to call a doctor for her.
- Mr. McEachern – the adoptive father of Joe Christmas. He is a devout Presbyterian who tries to instill religion, even with repeated, abusive whipping, in the young defiant orphan he has adopted. He disapproves of Christmas's growing disobedience and is himself beaten (and presumably killed) in a rage by Joe Christmas when he is 18. This abusive relationship of his childhood sheds important light on the formation of Christmas as a tortured and often cruel personality in his adulthood.
- Mrs. McEachern – the adoptive mother of Joe Christmas. She tries to protect Christmas, though he hates her and pulls away from her attempts to be kind to him.
- The dietitian – a woman who worked at the orphanage where Joe Christmas was raised. After he accidentally sees her with a man in her room, she tries unsuccessfully to have him transferred to an all-black orphanage.
- Mr. Armstid – a man who picks up Lena on her way to Jefferson, lets her spend the night at his house, and then gives her a ride to the city on his wagon.
- Mrs. Armstid – Armstid's wife, who gives Lena money in spite of her disdain for the young woman.
- Bobbie Allen – a waitress at a restaurant in Memphis whom the adolescent Joe Christmas falls in love with and proposes to on the night that he kills his father at a local dance. She scorns him and leaves him.
- Gavin Stevens – an educated man and district attorney who lives in Jefferson and offers commentary on some of the events at the end of the novel.
- Percy Grimm – the captain of the State National Guard who kills Joe Christmas and castrates him.

== Style and structure ==
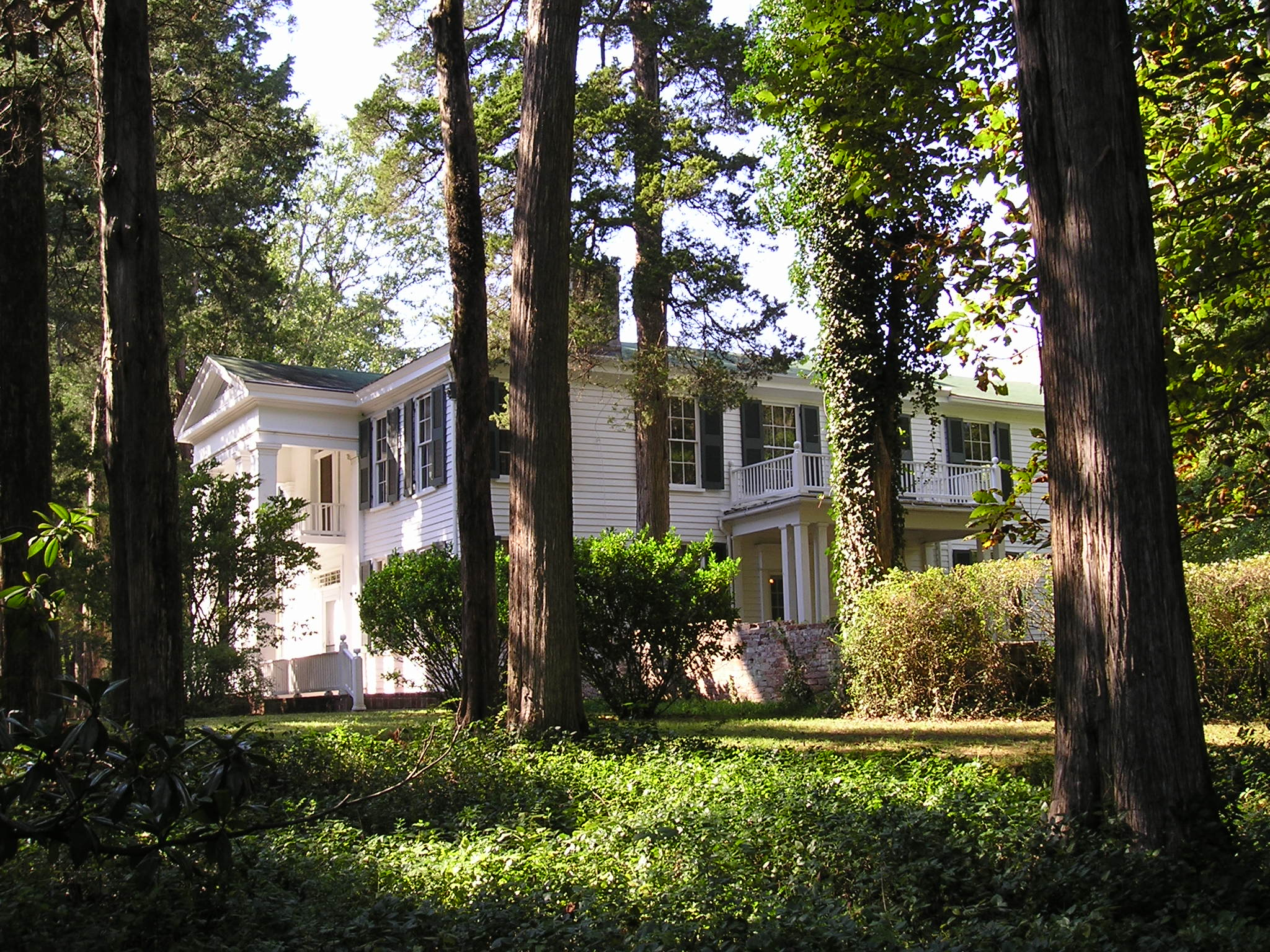
Faulkner's home Rowan Oak in Oxford, Mississippi, where he wrote the novel and, based on a casual remark from his wife Estelle, changed the name from "Dark House" to Light in August.

Due to its naturalistic, violent subject matter and obsession with the ghosts of the past, Light in August is characterized as a Southern gothic novel, a genre also exemplified by the works of Faulkner's contemporary Carson McCullers, and by later Southern writers like Flannery O'Connor, and Truman Capote. However, critics like Diane Roberts and David R. Jarraway view Faulkner's use of Southern gothic genre tropes, such as the dilapidated plantation house and the focus on mystery and horror, as self-conscious modernist commentary on man's "warped relationship with the past" and the impossibility of determining true identity.

According to Daniel Joseph Singal, Faulkner's literary style gradually developed from 19th century Victorian to modernist, with Light in August more firmly grounded in the tradition of the latter. The novel is characteristic of the modernist fascination with polarities—light and dark, good and evil—the burden of history on the present, and the splintering of personal identity. The plot is also divided into dual currents, one focusing on Lena Grove and the other on Joe Christmas, a technique that Faulkner continued to use in other works. The narrative is not structured in any particular order, as it is often interrupted by lengthy flashbacks and constantly shifts from one character to another. This lack of organization and narrative continuity was viewed negatively by some critics. As in his other novels, Faulkner employs elements of oral storytelling, allowing different characters to lend voice to the narrative in their own distinct Southern idiom. Unlike some of the other Yoknapatawpha County novels, Light in August does not rely solely on stream-of-consciousness narration, but also incorporates dialogue and an omniscient third-person narrator that develop the story.

=== Title ===
The title refers to the fire of the house that is at the center of the story. The whole novel revolves around one event, the fire, which is visible for miles around, and happens in August.

Some critics have speculated that the meaning of the title derives from a colloquial use of the word "light" to mean giving birth—typically used to describe when a cow will give birth and be "light" again—and connect this to Lena's pregnancy. Speaking of his choice of title, Faulkner denied this interpretation and stated,

... in August in Mississippi there's a few days somewhere about the middle of the month when suddenly there's a foretaste of fall, it's cool, there's a lambence, a soft, a luminous quality to the light, as though it came not from just today but from back in the old classic times. It might have fauns and satyrs and the gods and—from Greece, from Olympus in it somewhere. It lasts just for a day or two, then it's gone ... the title reminded me of that time, of a luminosity older than our Christian civilization."

Within the novel itself, the title is alluded to when Gail Hightower sits at his study window waiting for his recurring vision of his grandfather's last raid. The vision always occurs in "that instant when all light has failed out of the sky and it would be night save for that faint light which daygranaried leaf and grass blade reluctant suspire, making still a little light on earth though night itself has come." The story that would eventually become the novel, started by Faulkner in 1931, was originally titled "Dark House" and began with Hightower sitting at a dark window in his home. However, after a casual remark by his wife Estelle on the quality of the light in August, Faulkner changed the title.

== Themes ==
=== Alienation ===
All of the protagonists in the novel are misfits and social outcasts surrounded by an impersonal and largely antagonistic rural community, which is represented metonymically through minor or anonymous characters. Joanna Burden and Reverend Hightower are hounded by the people of Jefferson for years, in a failed effort to make them leave town. Byron Bunch, though more accepted in Jefferson, is still viewed as a mystery or simply overlooked. Both Joe Christmas and Lena Grove are orphans, strangers in town, and social outcasts, though the former draws anger and violence from the community, while the latter is looked down upon but receives generous assistance in her travels. According to Cleanth Brooks, this opposition between Joe and Lena is a pastoral reflection of the full spectrum of social alienation in modern society.

=== Christian allegory ===
There are a variety of parallels with Christian scripture in the novel. The life and death of Joe Christmas is reminiscent of the passion of Christ, Lena and her fatherless child parallel Mary and Christ, and Byron Bunch acts as a Joseph figure. Christian imagery such as the urn, the wheel, and the shadow, can be found throughout.

Light in August has 21 chapters, as does the Gospel of St. John. As Virginia V. James Hlavsa points out, each chapter in Faulkner corresponds to themes in John. For example, echoing John's famous, "In the beginning was the Word, and the Word was with God", is Lena's insistent faith in the "word" of Lucas, who is, after all, the father. John 5, the healing of the lame man by immersion, is echoed by Christmas's repeatedly being immersed in liquids. The teaching in the temple in John 7 is echoed by McEachern's attempts to teach Christmas his catechism. The crucifixion occurs in John 19, the same chapter in which Christmas is slain and castrated. However, the Christian references are dark and disturbing—Lena is obviously not a virgin, Christmas is an enraged murderer—and may be more appropriately viewed as pagan idols mistakenly worshipped as saints.

=== Race and sex ===
Faulkner is considered one of the foremost American writers on race in the United States, and his novels, including Light in August, often explore the persistent obsession with blood and race in the South that have carried over from the antebellum era to the 20th century. Christmas has light skin but is viewed as a foreigner by the people he meets, and the children in the orphanage in which he was raised called him "nigger." Chapter 6 begins with the oft-cited sentence: "Memory believes before knowing remembers," and gives an account of the five-year-old Christmas amongst the uniform denim of the other children. The first reference to him though is not by these children but by the dietitian who gave him a dollar to not tell about her amorous adventure with an intern doctor. However suspicion must fall on Doc Hines, Joe's deranged grandfather, who placed him in the orphanage and stays on as the boilerman. It is he who may have whispered the lie about the little boy's origins to the other children. Because of this, Joe Christmas is fixated on the idea that he has some African American blood, which Faulkner never confirms, and views his parentage as an original sin that has tainted his body and actions since birth. Because of his obsessive struggle with his twin identities, black and white, Christmas lives his life always on the road. The secret of his blackness is one that he abhors as well as cherishes; he often willingly tells white people that he is black in order to see their extreme reactions and becomes violent when one white Northern woman reacts nonchalantly. Though Christmas is guilty of violent crimes, Faulkner emphasizes that he is under the sway of social and psychological forces that are beyond his control and force him to reenact the part of the mythical black murderer and rapist from Southern history.

Christmas exemplifies how existing outside of categorization, being neither black nor white, is perceived as a threat by society that can only be reconciled with violence. He is also perceived as neither male nor female, just as Joanna Burden, whom Faulkner portrays as "masculinized," is also neither male nor female and is rejected by her community. Because of this, an early critic concluded that blackness and women were the "'twin Furies of the Faulknerian deep Southern Waste Land'" and reflected Faulkner's animosity toward life.

However, while women and minorities are both viewed as "subversive" and are restricted by the patriarchal society depicted in the novel, Lena Grove is able to travel safely and be cared for by people who hate and mistrust her, because she plays on the conventional rule that men are responsible for a woman's wellbeing. Thus, she is the only stranger who is not alienated and destroyed by the people of Jefferson, because the community recognizes her as the embodiment of nature and life. This romantic view of women in the novel posits that men have lost their innocent connection to the natural world, while women instinctively possess it.

=== Class and religion ===
In Light in August, as in most of the other novels set in Yoknapatawpha County, Faulkner focuses mainly on poor white Southerners, both from the upper and lower classes, who struggle to survive in the ruined post-war economy of the South. The characters in Light in August—who are mostly from the lower classes, with the exception of Reverend Hightower and Joanna Burden—are united by poverty and Puritanical values that cause them to regard an unwed mother like Lena Grove with disdain. Faulkner shows the restrictiveness and aggression of their Puritanical zeal, which has caused them to become "deformed" in their struggle against nature.

== Reception ==
When it was first published in 1932, the novel was moderately successful; 11,000 copies were initially printed, with a total of four printings by the end of the year, although a significant number of copies from the fourth printing had not been sold by 1936. In 1935, Maurice-Edgar Coindreau translated the novel into French. In the same year, it was translated into German along with several other of Faulkner's novels and short stories. These works initially met with approval from the Nazi censors and received much attention from German literary critics, because they assumed that Faulkner was a conservative agrarian positively depicting the struggle for racial purity; soon after, however, Faulkner's works were banned by the Nazis, and post-war German criticism reappraised him as an optimistic Christian humanist. Faulkner's books were not available in Germany until 1951 because US army censors also did not approve of his work.

According to Michael Millgate, though it is not typically considered Faulkner's best novel, Light in August was recognized early on as being "a major text, central to any understanding or evaluation of his career as a whole." He argues that many of the early American critics, most of whom were urban Northerners who viewed the South as backward and reactionary, focused on Faulkner's technical innovation in the field of narrative but missed or ignored the regional details and interconnectedness of the characters and setting to other works by the author. Some reviewers saw Faulkner's narrative techniques not as innovations but as errors, offering Faulkner recommendations on how to improve his style and admonishing him for his European modernist "tricks". Critics were also displeased with the violence depicted in the novel, pejoratively labeling it "gothic fantasy," despite the fact that lynching was a reality in the South. In spite of these complaints, the novel came to be viewed positively because of its violence and dark themes, as this was a contrast to the sentimental, romantic Southern literature of the time.

Time magazine included the novel in its TIME 100 Best English-language Novels from 1923 to 2005.

== Notes ==
Preceded by Sanctuary	Novels set in Yoknapatawpha County	Succeeded by Absalom, Absalom!
