= Miriam Hopkins =

American film and TV actress (1902–1972)

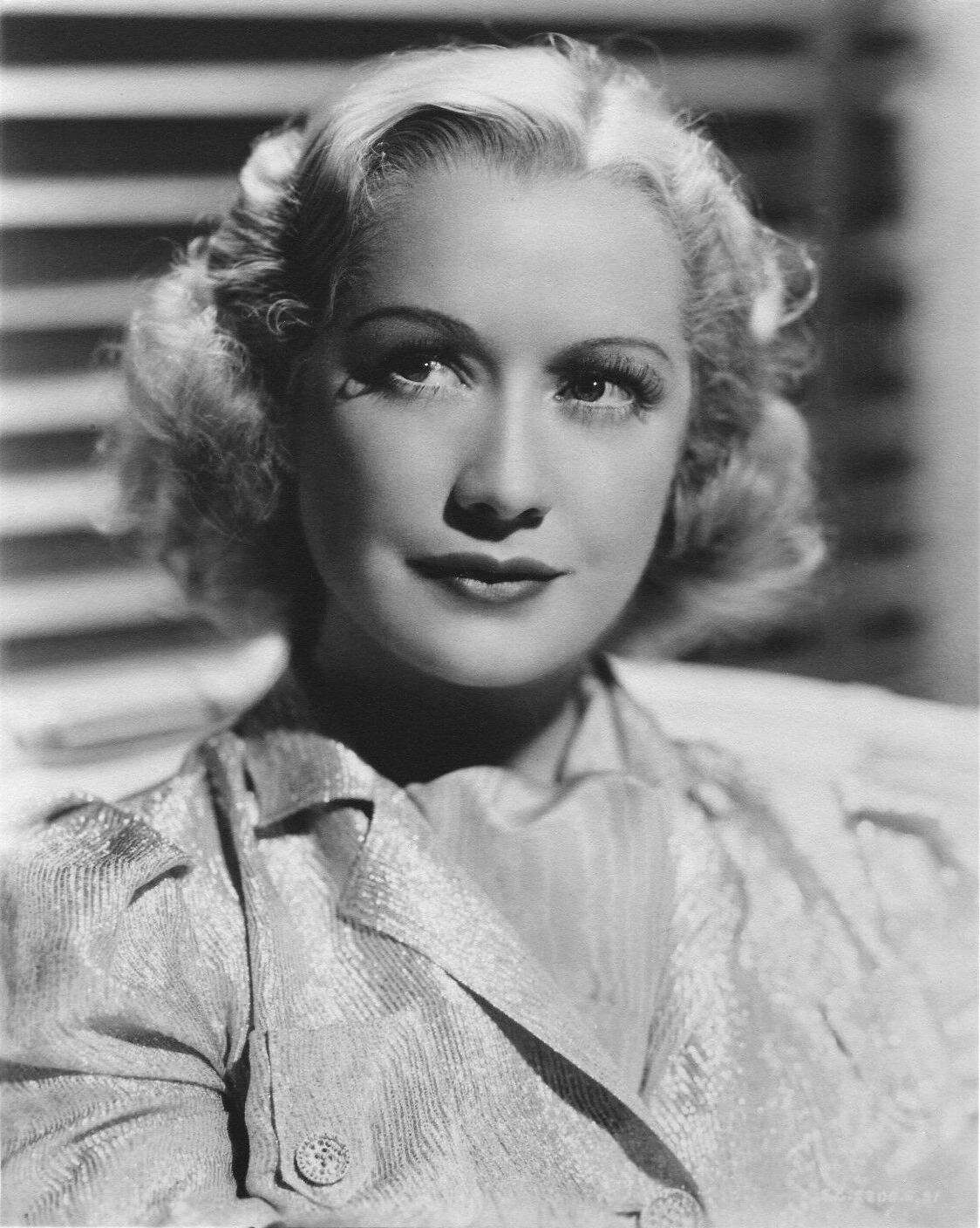
- Hopkins in the 1930s
- Born: Ellen Miriam Hopkins; October 18, 1902; Savannah, Georgia, U.S.
- Died: October 9, 1972 (aged 69); New York City, U.S.
- Occupation: Actress
- Years active: 1921–1970
- Political party: Democratic
- Spouse(s): Brandon Peters (m. 1926; div. 1927) Austin Parker (m. 1928; div. 1931) Anatole Litvak (m. 1937; div. 1939) Raymond B. Brock (m. 1945; div. 1951)
- Children: 1

Ellen Miriam Hopkins (October 18, 1902 – October 9, 1972) was an American actress known for her versatility. She signed with Paramount Pictures in 1930.

She portrayed a pickpocket in Ernst Lubitsch's romantic comedy Trouble in Paradise, a bar singer named Ivy in Rouben Mamoulian's Dr. Jekyll and Mr. Hyde, and the titular character in the controversial drama The Story of Temple Drake. She received a nomination for the Academy Award for Best Actress for the 1935 film Becky Sharp, becoming the first performer nominated for a color picture. She was nominated for a Golden Globe for The Heiress. She co-starred with Joel McCrea in five films.

Her long-running feud with actress Bette Davis was publicized for effect. Hopkins later became an important figure in television drama. She developed a reputation for hosting elegant parties, which were typically attended by intellectuals and artists she had befriended.

== Early life ==
Hopkins was born in Savannah, Georgia, to Homer Hopkins and Ellen Cutler. Her early childhood home was located at 321 Whitaker St (since demolished). She was raised in Bainbridge, near the Alabama border. She had an older sister, Ruby (1900–1990). Her maternal great-grandfather, the fourth mayor of Bainbridge, had helped establish St. John's Episcopal Church in the city. Hopkins sang in the choir as a girl.

In 1909, she briefly lived in Mexico with her family. After her parents separated, Hopkins moved as a teen with her mother to Syracuse, New York, to be near her paternal uncle, Thomas Cramer Hopkins, head of the geology department at Syracuse University.

Hopkins attended Goddard Seminary in Plainfield, Vermont (later renamed Goddard College), and Syracuse University in New York State.

== Career ==
At age 20, Hopkins became a chorus girl in New York City; she also acted regularly on the stage throughout the 1920s, including in the 1926 stage adaptation of Theodore Dreiser's An American Tragedy. In 1930, she starred on Broadway in the play Ritzy by Sidney Toler. She starred on Broadway in the lead of Jezebel, a 1933 play by Owen Davis. When it was adapted as a 1938 film of the same name, Hopkins was bitterly disappointed that Bette Davis was chosen for the role she had played on stage. This began a feud between them, which the motion picture studios publicized.

In 1930, Hopkins signed with Paramount Pictures and made her official film debut in Fast and Loose. Her first great success was in the 1931 horror drama film Dr. Jekyll and Mr. Hyde, where she portrayed Ivy Pearson, a prostitute who becomes entangled with Jekyll and Hyde. She received rave reviews, including one from Mordaunt Hall of the New York Times, saying she portrayed Ivy "splendidly".

Her career ascended swiftly. In 1932, she made her breakthrough in Ernst Lubitsch's Trouble in Paradise, where she proved her charm and wit as a beautiful and jealous pickpocket. During the pre-code Hollywood of the early 1930s, she appeared in The Smiling Lieutenant, The Story of Temple Drake, and Design for Living, all of which were box-office successes and critically acclaimed. Design for Living ranked as one of the top ten highest-grossing films of 1933.

Hopkins' early films were considered sexually risqué; produced in the years before the Motion Picture Production Code was rigorously enforced, they featured issues that would be prohibited after 1934. For instance, The Story of Temple Drake depicted a rape scene, and Design for Living featured a ménage à trois with Fredric March and Gary Cooper. Her successes continued during the remainder of the decade with the romantic comedy The Richest Girl in the World (1934); the historical drama Becky Sharp (1935), for which she was nominated for the Academy Award for Best Actress; Barbary Coast (1935); These Three (1936) (the first of four films with the director William Wyler); and The Old Maid (1939).

Hopkins was one of the early actresses approached to play the role of Ellie Andrews in It Happened One Night (1934). She rejected the part, and Claudette Colbert was cast. Hopkins auditioned for the role of Scarlett O'Hara in Gone with the Wind; she was the only candidate to be a native Georgian, but the part went to British actress Vivien Leigh.

Hopkins had well-publicized fights with Bette Davis. Hopkins and Davis co-starred in The Old Maid (1939) and Old Acquaintance (1943). In this period, she believed that Davis was having an affair with her husband Anatole Litvak. Davis resented her jealousy and said that she had enjoyed shaking Hopkins in a scene in Old Acquaintance after Hopkins's character makes unfounded allegations against Davis's. Press photos featured the two divas in a boxing ring, gloves up, with the director Vincent Sherman between them like a referee. In later interviews, Davis described Hopkins as a "terribly good actress", but also "terribly jealous".

"...destroyed her own career because of her overbearing, attention-seeking behaviour" - Sight and Sound

After Old Acquaintance, Hopkins did not work in films again until The Heiress (1949), where she played the lead character's aunt. In Mitchell Leisen's 1951 comedy The Mating Season, she gave a comic performance as the mother of Gene Tierney's character. She also acted in The Children's Hour (1961), a remake of her film These Three (1936). In the remake, she played the aunt to Shirley MacLaine, who took Hopkins' original role. Her last film roles included Robert Redford's mother in The Chase (1966) and as an ageing former Hollywood star in the horror film Savage Intruder (1970).

Hopkins was a television pioneer. She performed in teleplays from the late 1940s through the late 1960s, in such programs as The Chevrolet Tele-Theatre (1949), Pulitzer Prize Playhouse (1951), Lux Video Theatre (1951–1955), and in episodes of The Investigators (1961), The Outer Limits (1964), and The Flying Nun in 1969.

She has two stars on the Hollywood Walk of Fame: one for film at 1709 Vine Street and one for television at 1716 Vine Street.

== Personal life ==
Hopkins married four times. Her first marriage was to actor Brandon Peters, second to aviator and screenwriter Austin Parker, third to the director Anatole Litvak, and fourth to war correspondent Raymond B. Brock. In 1932, she adopted a son, Michael T. Hopkins (March 29, 1932 – October 5, 2010), who had a career in the U.S. Air Force.

In the early 1930s, between her second and third marriages, Hopkins had a passionate relationship with Random House publisher Bennett Cerf.

She was known for hosting elegant parties. John O'Hara, a frequent guest, noted that

most of her guests were chosen from the world of the intellect ... Miriam knew them all, had read their work, had listened to their music, had bought their paintings. They were not there because a secretary had given her a list of highbrows.

She was a staunch Democrat who strongly supported the presidency of Franklin D. Roosevelt.

== Death ==
Hopkins died in New York City from a heart attack on October 9, 1972. She is buried in Oak City Cemetery in Bainbridge, Georgia.

== Filmography ==
| Year | Title | Role | Notes |
|---|---|---|---|
| 1928 | The Home Girl | | short Paramount film |
| 1930 | Fast and Loose | Marion Lenox | Hopkins's feature film debut |
| 1931 | The Smiling Lieutenant | Princess Anna | The first of three films Hopkins made with Lubitsch |
| 1931 | 24 Hours | Rosie Duggan | |
| 1931 | Dr. Jekyll and Mr. Hyde | Ivy Pearson | |
| 1932 | Two Kinds of Women | Emma Krull | |
| 1932 | Dancers in the Dark | Gloria Bishop | |
| 1932 | The World and the Flesh | Maria Yaskaya | |
| 1932 | Trouble in Paradise | Lily | Second film directed by Lubitsch and starring Hopkins |
| 1933 | The Story of Temple Drake | Temple Drake | Based on Faulkner's scandalous novel Sanctuary |
| 1933 | The Stranger's Return | Louise Starr | |
| 1933 | Design for Living | Gilda Farrell | Third and final film Hopkins and Lubitsch made together |
| 1934 | All of Me | Lydia Darrow | |
| 1934 | She Loves Me Not | Curly Flagg | |
| 1934 | The Richest Girl in the World | Dorothy Hunter | First of five films Hopkins and Joel McCrea made together |
| 1935 | Becky Sharp | Becky Sharp | Nominated – Academy Award for Best Actress; The first feature film made in three-strip Technicolor |
| 1935 | Barbary Coast | Mary 'Swan' Rutledge | Second film starring Hopkins and McCrea |
| 1935 | Splendor | Phyllis Manning Lorrimore | Third film starring Hopkins and McCrea |
| 1936 | These Three | Martha Dobie | The film was adapted from the 1934 play The Children's Hour by Lillian Hellman. Fourth film starring Hopkins and McCrea |
| 1936 | Men Are Not Gods | Ann Williams | |
| 1937 | The Woman I Love | Madame Helene Maury | Hopkins married director Anatole Litvak shortly after this film was made. |
| 1937 | Woman Chases Man | Virginia Travis | Final film Hopkins and Joel McCrea made together |
| 1937 | Wise Girl | Susan 'Susie' Fletcher | |
| 1939 | The Old Maid | Delia Lovell Ralston | The first of two films Hopkins made with Bette Davis |
| 1940 | Virginia City | Julia Hayne | Hopkins co-starred with Errol Flynn |
| 1940 | Lady with Red Hair | Mrs. Leslie Carter | |
| 1942 | A Gentleman After Dark | Flo Melton | |
| 1943 | Old Acquaintance | Millie Drake | Second of two films Hopkins made with Bette Davis. |
| 1949 | The Heiress | Lavinia Penniman | Nominated – Golden Globe Award for Best Supporting Actress – Motion Picture |
| 1951 | The Mating Season | Fran Carleton | |
| 1952 | The Outcasts of Poker Flat | Mrs. Shipton / 'The Duchess' | |
| 1952 | Carrie | Julie Hurstwood | |
| 1961 | The Children's Hour | Lily Mortar | Hopkins had starred in the original film adaptation of the play The Children's Hour titled These Three in the role of Martha Dobie. In this film, Shirley MacLaine played Martha, and Miriam Hopkins played her Aunt Lily. |
| 1964 | Fanny Hill | Mrs. Maude Brown | |
| 1966 | The Chase | Mrs. Reeves | Hopkins played the mother of Robert Redford's character |
| 1970 | Savage Intruder | Katharine Parker | |

== Sources ==
- Ellenberger, Allan R. (2017). Miriam Hopkins: Life and Films of a Hollywood Rebel. Lexington, Kentucky: University Press of Kentucky. ISBN 978-0-8131743-1-0
