= Bill Welsh =

American television announcer (1911–2000)

Bill Welsh (April 25, 1911 – February 27, 2000) was an American radio and television announcer.

== Early years ==
Welsh born in Greeley, Colorado, the son of Mr. and Mrs. W.H. Welsh. He attended the Colorado State College of Education.

== Career ==
Welsh's career in broadcasting began with a part-time job at radio station KFKA in Greely. Beginning as a disk jockey and announcer, he expanded his work into gathering news and giving evening newscasts. His coverage of the murder of a police sergeant caught the attention of executives at KFEL radio in Denver, and he went to work there next, staying at that station from 1935 to 1942.

Welsh's television debut came in the broadcast of a hockey game on KTLA in Los Angeles. His broadcasting of sporting events included the first telecast of a Rose Bowl Game, in addition to coverage of football games of southern California colleges and games of the Los Angeles Dons of the All-America Football Conference. Over the course of his career, he broadcast 49 Rose Parades.

In 1949, Welsh and fellow KTLA newsman Stan Chambers were on the air for 27.5 hours as they provided live coverage of attempts to rescue Kathy Fiscus, a child who had fallen down a well in San Marino.

Welsh signed a permanent contract with KTTV on April 1, 1951, and for years was director of sports and special events. Over his career, he broadcast 49 Rose Parades. He covered 63 sports, ranging from football and basketball to wrestling and jalopy races, lawn bowling, cricket and golf. The versatile broadcaster also hosted an early version of divorce court, beauty pageants and game shows. He presented a program staged in grocery stores from Santa Catalina to Pomona called “Star Shoppers,” broadcast Hollywood Bowl Easter sunrise services and covered whatever else was going on. Welsh once joked that KTTV kept him on the payroll over the decades because “when they want to do something live . . . they need somebody who can talk and talk and talk.”

During World War II, Welsh worked for the Office of War Information for four years.

In addition to his work as a broadcaster, Welsh was general manager of Allied Advertising Agency.

== Community involvement ==
From 1980 to 1990, Welsh was president of the Hollywood Chamber of Commerce. His obituary in the Los Angeles Times.called him "a key force" in obtaining the Los Angeles City Council's approval of a redevelopment plan in 1986. "It was Welsh", the article said, "who raised $150,000 in 1983 for a crucial feasibility study, and Welsh who called Mayor Tom Bradley and other community leaders together at a Brown Derby lunch to convince them that redevelopment could -- and should -- happen".

== Personal life ==
Welsh was married to Lucinda Pennington.

== Death ==
On February 27, 2000, Welsh died of an aortic aneurysm at his home in Thousand Oaks, California.

== Recognition ==
For his work on TV, in 1980, he received a star on the Hollywood Walk of Fame.

In 1949 and 1950, Welsh was runner-up for the Los Angeles Emmy Award for top television personality on the West Coast. In 1991, he received the Los Angeles Area Governors Emmy Award.

== Filmography ==
- The Great Jewel Robber (1950) "Claussen" - Jeweler
- Storm Warning (1951) - TV announcer
- The Day the Earth Stood Still (1951) Appeared as a radio newscaster (uncredited) in the 1951 classic.
- The Las Vegas Story (1952) "Mr. Martin"
- The Rose Bowl Story (1952) Played himself in the film.
- Just This Once (1952) uncredited.
- Savage Intruder (1970) as a TV announcer
