= Lester Rawlins =

American actor (1924–1988)

- Lester Rawlins in The Defenders, 1961
- Born: September 24, 1924; Sharon, Pennsylvania
- Died: March 22, 1988 (aged 63)
- Education: Carnegie Mellon College of Drama
- Occupation: Actor
- Years active: 1958–1985

Lester Rawlins (September 24, 1924 – March 22, 1988) was an American actor of stage, film and television.

== Early life and education ==
Born in Sharon, Pennsylvania, Rawlins graduated from the Carnegie Mellon College of Drama in 1950 with a BFA.

== Career ==
Stage

Rawlins appeared in off-Broadway productions of Hamlet, Macbeth, Romeo and Juliet, Richard III, Winterset, In the Bar of a Tokyo Hotel, and Nightride, for which he won the Drama Desk Award for Outstanding Performance.

His Broadway credits included A Man for All Seasons and Da, for which he won the Tony Award for Best Performance by a Featured Actor in a Play and was nominated for the Drama Desk Award for Outstanding Featured Actor in a Play. Rawlins also won Obie Awards for his performance in the 1964 off-Broadway production of the play The Old Glory by the poet Robert Lowell and for his performances in off-Broadway productions of Brendan Behan's The Quare Fellow and Henrik Ibsen's Hedda Gabler.

Screen

Rawlins' feature film appearances include Diary of a Mad Housewife and They Might Be Giants. On television, Rawlins had recurring roles on The Defenders, Kojak, The Secret Storm, and Ryan's Hope. He was a regular on the CBS soap opera, The Edge of Night for several years, where he played the role of wealthy Orin Hillyer. Rawlins' final screen role was on The Equalizer in the 1985 episode "Reign of Terror" portraying Doctor Timms, who is retiring from his practice, being too tired of local gang activity.

He also could be heard on television and radio commercials, and was most notably the voice-over for the Dunkin' Donuts television and radio advertising campaign created by the New York advertising agency Ally & Gargano.

== Death ==
Rawlins died of cardiac arrest in New York City in 1988.

== Filmography ==
Lester Rawlins film and television credits
Year	Title	Role	Notes
1961–1965	The Defenders	Dr. Herman Wohl / Dr. Robert Hartog / Dr. Seth Ettinger	6 episodes
1962	The Secret Storm	Arthur Rysdale	
1966–1973	The Edge of Night	Orin Hillyer	Recurring role
1970	Diary of a Mad Housewife	Dr. Linstrom	Film
1971	They Might Be Giants	Blevins	Film
1975	Starsky & Hutch	C.J. Woodfield	1 episode
1975	Requiem for a Nun	Nancy's lawyer	TV movie
1976	God Told Me To	Board Chairman	Film
1976–1977	Kojak	Assistant D.A. Angus Moore	4 episodes
1977	A Secret Space	Kevin King	Film
1981	Ryan's Hope	Spencer Smith	Recurring role
1983	Lovesick	Silent Patient	Film
1984	The Equalizer	Doctor Timms	Episode: "Reign of Terror"
