= They Might Be Giants (film) =

1971 film by Anthony Harvey

- Theatrical release poster
- Directed by: Anthony Harvey
- Screenplay by: James Goldman
- Based on: They Might Be Giants; 1961 play by James Goldman
- Produced by: John Foreman
- Starring: George C. Scott; Joanne Woodward; Jack Gilford; Lester Rawlins; Al Lewis; Rue McClanahan
- Cinematography: Victor J. Kemper
- Edited by: Gerald B. Greenberg
- Music by: John Barry
- Production company: Newman-Foreman Company
- Distributed by: Universal Pictures
- Release date: June 9, 1971
- Running time: 98 minutes
- Country: United States
- Language: English

They Might Be Giants is a 1971 American comedy mystery film based on the 1961 play of the same name (both written by James Goldman) starring George C. Scott and Joanne Woodward. The play opened at Stratford East in 1961, and closed after only four weeks.

The film's title was later adopted as the name of a popular music group.

== Plot ==
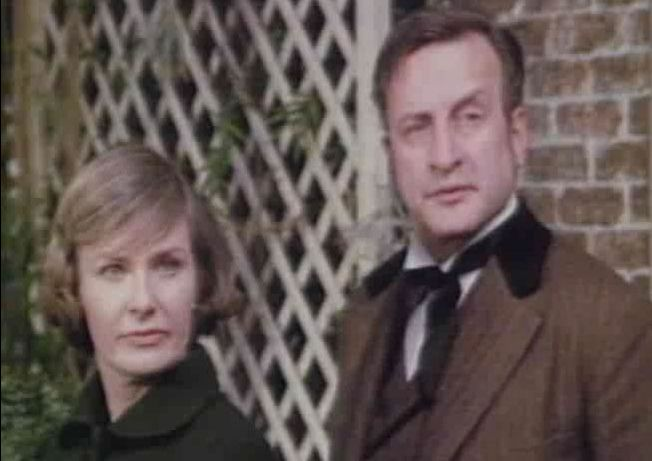
Joanne Woodward and George C. Scott in They Might Be Giants.

Justin Playfair is an eminent judge who retreats into fantasy after his wife's death, imagining himself to be Sherlock Holmes, the legendary fictional detective. Complete with deerstalker hat, pipe and violin, he spends his days in a homemade criminal laboratory obsessing over plots hatched by his (Holmes's) archenemy Professor Moriarty, and pursuing clues throughout the city.

Justin's brother Blevins tries to commit Justin to a mental institution run by his friend Dr. Strauss so he can get power of attorney and control Justin's finances. The criminal to whom Blevins owes money is more than willing to get it by killing Justin so Blevins can inherit.

Psychiatrist Dr. Mildred Watson's signature is needed on the commitment papers. She insists on doing a proper interview and is immediately fascinated by Justin, who demonstrates a knack for what Holmes describes as "deduction" (technically better categorized as abductive reasoning) as well as for hand-to-hand combat. He walks out of the institution during the ensuing confusion, and Watson comes to his home to attempt treatment. Justin is initially dismissive of Watson's attempts to psychoanalyze him. He knows of Justin Playfair, who tried to make the world the kind of place it might have been and went mad. “I am not that man,” he declares, and tests his logic on her with a scathing analysis of her lonely life, down to the fact that her suit is 10 years old. But when he hears her name, he enthusiastically incorporates her into his life as Dr. John Watson, the sidekick to his Holmes. Watson accepts the role of “chronicler”.

They begin an enigmatic quest for Moriarty, following all manner of bizarre and (to Watson) unintelligible clues and encountering a rich tapestry of people in assorted urban situations. Eventually he takes her to Wilbur Peabody, who thinks Dr. Watson is deluded until she identifies herself. He has known Justin for more than 30 years. She leaves Justin there.

The next morning, Wilbur wakes Justin, who fell asleep reading about himself in Who's Who. He asks Wilbur which is his life, since he has no memories. Wilbur wishes he were the Scarlet Pimpernel. Watson rushes in declaring that Blevins wants Justin's money. They'll find Moriarty first and then deal with his brother. Justin is energized: "I'm very glad you're here. I like you very much."

At an abandoned building, they find an older couple who retired from the world in 1939 to grow magnificent topiaries. The crook and his henchman appear. Holmes and Watson escape by different exits.

They are to meet as prearranged at Watson's small apartment at 7 pm. Holmes arrives late, by the fire escape, bearing flowers. Watson is wearing a white organdy dress with short puff sleeves and a pink satin sash. Her dinner preparations have been disastrous. They have a drink and he talks about going out together after this is over. She agrees. They are dancing when a bullet smashes the window, grazing his forehead and knocking him to the floor. Distraught, she calls him "my Holmes."

The two head to the midnight rendezvous with Moriarty. Wilbur and the other fascinating people they met earlier join in a brisk parade past New York City landmarks. They stop by a kiosk covering a manhole. He tells his friends that Earth is shining under the soot. He takes Watson's hand and they descend into a tunnel. The others do not follow. A giant supermarket is a dead end. Then Watson comes up with their next stop, the Riding School just off Central Park.

She means to walk with him. She is not afraid. They express their love for each other, and Holmes hears Moriarty coming, on horseback. Watson hears nothing—and then she does, and we do, the sound of hoofbeats approaching from the darkness beneath a bridge. They hold hands. The camera zooms in and a bright light shines on and around them, growing brighter until it almost fills the screen.

== Cast ==
- George C. Scott as Justin Playfair
- Joanne Woodward as Watson
- Jack Gilford as Peabody
- Lester Rawlins as Blevins
- Al Lewis as Messenger
- Rue McClanahan as Daisy
- Ron Weyand as Dr. Strauss
- Oliver Clark as Mr. Small
- Theresa Merritt as Peggy
- Michael McGuire as Telephone Guard
- Eugene Roche as Policeman
- James Tolkan as Mr. Brown
- Kitty Winn as Grace
- Sudie Bond as Maud
- Staats Cotsworth as Winthrop
- F. Murray Abraham as Clyde
- Paul Benedict as Chestnut Man
- M. Emmet Walsh as 1st Sanitation Man
- Louis Zorich as 2nd Sanitation Man

== Title explanation ==
The title is an indirect reference to Don Quixote's famous exploit of tilting at windmills, believing them to be "monstrous giants". In reference to this, the character Justin Playfair argues:

Well he had a point. Of course, he carried it a bit too far. He thought that every windmill was a giant. That's insane. But, thinking that they might be...well...all the best minds used to think the world was flat. — But, what if it isn't? — It might be round — and bread mold might be medicine. If we never looked at things and thought of what they might be, why, we'd all still be out there in the tall grass with the apes.

== Production ==
Supermarket scenes were filmed at Pathmark stores. Scenes were filmed in New York City.

== Critical views ==
The film opened to mixed reviews. Vincent Canby of The New York Times called it "a mushy movie with occasional, isolated moments of legitimate comedy." On Rotten Tomatoes it has an approval rating of 61% based on reviews from 18 critics.

== Releases ==
There have been various running times of the film over the years, with the Kino Blu-ray at 91 minutes. The largest missing material is a long sequence near the end that takes place in a grocery store.

== Movie tie-in paperback ==
Several months before the opening of the film, Lancer Books published James Goldman's screenplay as a tie-in mass market paperback, profusely illustrated with black and white movie stills. Surviving copies have become extremely rare.
