= Requiem for a Nun (TV movie) =

Requiem for a Nun is a 1975 TV movie, based on the play Requiem for a Nun by Ruth Ford. The play in term originates from the novel Requiem for a Nun.

It was produced by WNET, with the specific producer being Norman Lloyd. It was a part of the "Hollywood Television Theater" series.

According to Miles, she wanted to be Temple because "it seemed to me to be an impossible task."

== Cast ==
The cast include:

- Sarah Miles - Temple Drake
- Mary Alice - Nancy Mannigoe
- Lawrence Pressman - Gowan Stevens
- Lester Rawlins - Gavin Stevens - The lawyer of Nancy and the uncle of Temple
- Sam Edwards - Governor
- Kiel Martin - Pete (Red's Brother)

== Reception ==
Kay Gardella, in the New York Daily News, wrote that the film is "a memorable performance".

Dick Adler in the Los Angeles Times stated that the film has a "strong finish".
