= Savage Intruder =

1970 film by Donald Wolfe

- Directed by: Donald Wolfe
- Written by: Donald Wolfe
- Produced by: Ann May; Donald Wolfe
- Starring: Miriam Hopkins; John David Garfield; Gale Sondergaard; Florence Lake
- Cinematography: John Arthur Morrill
- Edited by: Hartwig Deeb
- Music by: Stu Phillips
- Production company: Congdon Productions
- Release date: 1970
- Running time: 91 minutes
- Country: United States
- Language: English

Savage Intruder (also known as Hollywood Horror House) is a 1970 American psychological horror film directed by Donald Wolfe and starring Miriam Hopkins, John David Garfield and Gale Sondergaard.

== Plot ==
The film opens with Golden Age of Hollywood stock footage with the credits over footage of the decrepit Hollywood Sign in an homage to the film-within-a-film in Singin' in the Rain.

Katharine Packard, a once-prolific movie star now struggling with alcoholism, lives a quiet and reclusive life of retirement with a small group of servants in a mansion in the Hollywood Hills. One morning, during a drunken stupor, Katharine accidentally falls down the stairs and injures her leg, and is told she will have to stay in a wheelchair for a while because of it. As a result, Katharine and her servants hire a young man named Victor "Vic" Valance to act as her personal assistant and nurse. Unbeknownst to any of them, however, is that Vic is actually a serial killer who has been murdering and dismembering middle-aged women in and around the Hollywood area.

Over time, Katharine and Vic develop a close friendship, and even begin to develop romantic feelings for each other. During this time, Vic begins dating and eventually has sex with Katharine's personal cook, Greta. Tensions arise after Katharine's secretary Leslie insinuates to Greta that Vic and Katharine are in a sexual relationship; something that Greta was apparently unaware of. When Greta confronts Vic about it, an argument breaks out which results in Vic slapping her and attempting to hold her back when she tries to run away. Devastated, Greta tells Leslie that she is quitting her job at the mansion and will be leaving in the morning. That night, Greta is decapitated by Vic with a cleaver.

The next morning, Vic tells Leslie that Greta has left the estate, which makes her suspicious of him because Greta had told her that she was going inform Katharine of her relationship with Vic before leaving. That night, Leslie sneaks into Vic's room and finds a herion needle in his drawer. She also finds a small briefcase in his closet, but Vic suddenly appears before she can open it and orders her to leave. Leslie complies, but not before accusing Vic of "taking advantage" of Katharine's vulnerability and telling him that she will do everything she can to ensure that he leaves and never comes back.

The following day, Leslie manages to convince Katharine that Vic is no more than a "vulgar opportunist", and so Katharine orders him to leave. Vic obliges, but returns not long after and knocks Katharine unconscious before injecting vodka into her bloodstream. Eventually, after psychologically tormenting her, Vic murders Katharine, and, by using his manipulation skills, as well as a mannequin that resembles Katharine, Vic is able to establish himself as the new man of the house after murdering Leslie and Katharine's maid Mildred.

== Cast ==
- Miriam Hopkins as Katharine Packard
- David Patton Garfield as Vic Valance (as John David Garfield)
- Gale Sondergaard as Leslie Blair
- Florence Lake as Mildred
- Virginia Wing as Greta
- Lester Matthews as Ira Jaffee
- Riza Royce as Mrs. Jaffee
- Joe Besser as Bus Driver
- Charles Martin as Doctor
- Jason Johnson as Josef
- Bill Welsh as TV Announcer
- Minta Durfee as Guest

== Production ==
Donald Wolfe shot Hollywood Horror House on and off between late 1969 and mid 1973 with funds from his star's home tour bus company, with "lurid, candy-colored freak-outs" shot by Cinematographer John Arthur Morrill (A Boy and His Dog (1975 film)) and grisly murder set pieces.

== Release ==
It was filmed as The Comeback, two years later it released theatrically as Savage Intruder and later issued on VHS by Unicorn as Hollywood Horror House, without an official DVD release.

== Bibliography ==
- Axel Nissen. Actresses of a Certain Character: Forty Familiar Hollywood Faces from the Thirties to the Fifties. McFarland, 2007.
