= Popeye (Faulkner character) =

Popeye is a character in William Faulkner's 1931 novel Sanctuary. He is a Memphis, Tennessee-based criminal who rapes Temple Drake and introduces her into a criminal world which corrupts her.

Popeye is unable to sexually perform. Owing to this aspect of his body, in the original novel, Popeye instead uses a corncob to violate her. Doreen Fowler, author of "Reading for the "Other Side": Beloved and Requiem for a Nun," wrote that Popeye wished to "despoil and possess the secret dark inner reaches of woman."

== Adaptations ==
In the 1933 film The Story of Temple Drake he is replaced by Trigger, played by Jack La Rue. Trigger is able to sexually perform.

In the 1961 film Sanctuary the equivalent character is named Candy Man, played by Yves Montand. He is an amalgamation of the original Popeye; Red, another gangster; and Pete, Red's brother. Pauline Degenfelder, who analyzed several Faulkner stories and wrote academic articles about them, described him as Cajun, while a publicity poster called him "Creole". Gene D. Phillips of Loyola University of Chicago wrote that Candy's "French accent gives him an exotic quality" attracting Temple to him; the film has the character originate in New Orleans to match the change. Candy Man is able to sexually perform, and Phillips stated that when Temple is raped, Candy Man "demonstrates his virility unequivocally". According to Degenfelder, the new character name is a reference to his sexual allure and his job illegally transporting alcohol, as "candy" also referred to alcohol. Phillips stated that the merging of Pete into Candy Man means the film is made "more tightly into a continuous narrative" from the plots of the two original works, and also that the film does not have to make efforts to establish a new character towards the film's end.

== Analysis ==
T. H. Adamowski wrote in Canadian Review of American Studies that usual characterizations of Popeye reflect an ""electric-light-stamped-tin" syndrome". Philip G. Cohen, David Krase, and Karl F. Zender, authors of a section on William Faulkner in Sixteen Modern American Authors, wrote that Adamowski's analysis of Popeye was "philosophically and psychologically sophisticated".

== Legacy ==
Gene D. Phillips of Loyola University of Chicago wrote that Slim Grisson of No Orchids for Miss Blandish was "modeled after Popeye."
