= Fiction, Film, and Faulkner =

1988 non-fiction book by Gene D. Phillips

Fiction, Film, and Faulkner: The Art of Adaptation is a 1988 non-fiction book by Gene D. Phillips, published by University of Tennessee Press. It is about William Faulkner, his works, and film adaptations of his works.

== Contents ==
The book has two sections total.

The initial section of the book is about Faulkner's screenwriting period. It includes an essay by Jerry Wald. This section was as a method of providing background to the topic of adaptations. the body text is in two parts. The section includes information on films which Faulkner co-wrote the screenplays for.

The second section describes the films based on Faulkner works in which he did not have a role in making. In order to, in Fadiman's words, "help fit" the works "into the Faulkner chronology", the section has biographical information about the author. This section also describes how works received censorship in their film versions.

== Reception ==
Regina Fadiman, a reviewer from Los Angeles, stated that the work focuses on characters, plotlines, and themes, while having "neglect" towards filming techniques; she described the work as being "weak" on the film technique aspects. She also stated that having the information on Faulkner's screenwriting in the first part of the book is "useful" to incorporate together with other content, even though prior works already covered that information.

Charles M. Oliver of Ohio Northern University wrote that Phillips compared the original books and films with such "intricate care" that it makes the readers examine both equally, making Fiction, Film, and Faulkner "so superb".

Stephen C. Shafer of University of Illinois at Urbana-Champaign stated that the work is "well-written, highly readable, and informative", and that the organization was "effectively" done.
