= Requiem for a Nun (play) =

Requiem for a Nun (French: Requiem pour une nonne) is a play by Albert Camus, adapted from William Faulkner's 1951 novel of the same name. The play was published in 1962.

The play was performed in Paris at the Théâtre des Mathurins during the 1956/1957 season. Catherine Sellers portrayed the pivitol role of Temple Drake. The performers were: Michel Auclair, François Perrot, Marc Cassot, François Dalou, Jacques Gripel, Michel Maurette, Tatiana Moukhine.

Camus had a great admiration for Faulkner. In his play, he changed the dialogues substantially. According to John Philip Couch "In Requiem pour une nonne Camus achieved an unusual density and tension appropriate to tragedy... One may conclude that for the first time in his career Camus was capable of writing a serious play worthy of his accomplishments in the novel."

The English Stage Company at the Royal Court Theatre presented William Faulkner's adaptation from the novel (although the Random House edition of the play gives some credit to Ruth Ford in developing the performance script). The play opened in London on November 27, 1957 with Ruth Ford as Temple and a cast that included Zachary Scott and Bertice Reading. It was directed by Tony Richardson.

The Broadway production opened at the John Golden Theatre on January 30, 1959, with the same cast principals, also directed by Tony Richardson. Nancy Drew Taylor in her The Dramatic Productions of Requiem for a Nun wrote: "Before the play was seen by an American audience, it had been staged in twelve foreign countries, the two most popular being the London production and Camus' adaptation in France." Although the New York production closed after 43 performances, it was included in The Burns Mantle Yearbook; The Best Plays of 1958-1959.

Harold Hobson in The Sunday Times wrote: “There is nothing on the London stage as powerful as this tense drama.” Brooks Atkinson in the New York Times wrote: “Nothing can be taken hold of or defined. But the slow flow of dialogue is characteristic of Mr. Faulkner, who listens to a distant drum.” Harold Clurman in The Nation wrote: “It resembles the state of mind Europe was in shortly after the war: since everyone felt tainted in some way, cleansing seemed possible only by an admission of one’s guilt.”

== Revivals ==
The Guthrie Theater in Minneapolis, Minnesota presented the play as part of its 1982-83 season. It was directed by Liviu Ciulei. Rohan Preston of the Star Tribune wrote of Ciulei “He staged plays and operas worldwide, making his mark with a bold visual aesthetic and a politically charged approach to directing.” Richard Corliss in Time Magazine wrote: "The play, like Oedipus Rex, is a detective story that tracks truths its characters would not reveal to others or themselves."

Cesear's Forum, a minimalist theatre company, presented the play in a 1993 Chicago production. Lawrence Bommer in his Chicago Tribune review wrote: "Faulkner lays on the Southern Gothic-soap operatic trappings-blackmail, drunkenness, child abandonment, adultery. Faulkner makes his characters talk this all out. Greg Cesear's measured staging respects that talk to a fault, treating the creepy revelations with a sedate deliberateness that makes them hard to ignite. The result is icy-elegant acting...set in amber."

== See also ==
- Temple Drake
- Requiem pour une nonne francais

• James Baldwin, No Name in the Street
