= Maurice Coindreau =

Maurice-Edgar Coindreau (December 24, 1892 – October 20, 1990) was a literary critic and translator of fiction from English into French and Spanish. He is notable for having introduced many canonical American authors of the 20th century—such as William Faulkner, John Dos Passos, John Steinbeck, Flannery O'Connor and Ernest Hemingway—to the French speaking public.

== Life ==
Coindreau was born in La Roche-sur-Yon, France, in 1892. He moved to Spain and taught French in Madrid before traveling to the United States. From 1922 to 1961, he taught French at Princeton University. After World War II, he spent time in Paris at the Hôtel du Pont Royal, a notable center for French intellectuals.

== Work ==
In 1930, a student of Coindreau at Princeton introduced him to As I Lay Dying, a novel by William Faulkner, who was then a little-known novelist from Mississippi. Coindreau was impressed by the book and undertook a French translation. In June 1931, he published an article on Faulkner in La Nouvelle Revue Française and continued to write critical essays on the author's work, helping to popularize Faulkner in France. In 1937, he accepted Faulkner's invitation to visit his home Rowan Oak near Oxford, Mississippi. Coindreau had already written the first draft of his translation of The Sound and the Fury and asked Faulkner to help him clear up some of the unresolved questions he had about the novel.

Coindreau also translated the works of Ernest Hemingway, John Dos Passos, and John Steinbeck and Flannery O'Connor into French, helping to usher in the "Age of the American novel" in France.
