= Miriam Hopkins: Life and Films of a Hollywood Rebel =

2017 book by Allan R. Ellenberger

Miriam Hopkins: The Life and Films of a Hollywood Rebel
- First edition
- Author: Allan R. Ellenberger
- Genre: Biography
- Published: 2017 (University of Kentucky Press)
- Publication place: United States
- ISBN: 9780813174310

Miriam Hopkins: Life and Films of a Hollywood Rebel is a 2017 non-fiction book published by the University of Kentucky Press and written by Allan R. Ellenberger concerning the actress Miriam Hopkins.

== Background ==
It is a part of the University of Kentucky Press Screen Classics series documenting films with some relationship to Kentucky. Ellenberger had researched the subject for around a decade. He had previously conversed with the Hopkins' son, Michael.

== Reception ==
Melinda Mathews, a library employee of the University of Louisiana at Monroe, wrote that the book is "perfect for public and academic libraries."

Dan Callahan wrote in Sight and Sound that despite the author's research focus, the tone is done "unenthusiastically at times, and without any real insight to either her work or her personality" despite the "fair amount of new information" present. Callahan concluded that "this is a book that leaves more questions about Hopkins than answers".
