= Gene D. Phillips =

American author, educator, and Catholic priest

Gene D. Phillips S.J.
- Born: March 3, 1935; Springfield, Ohio
- Died: Monday, August 29, 2016; Wauwatosa, Wisconsin
- Occupations: priest, professor, and author
- Organization: Society of Jesus
- Known for: books on filmmakers, literature and film

Gene D. Phillips, S.J. (March 3, 1935 – August 29, 2016) was an American author, educator, and Catholic priest.

== Life and career ==
Phillips was raised near Springfield, Ohio. He received his A.B. and M.A. (1957) degrees from Loyola University of Chicago, and a Ph.D. in English Literature from Fordham University in 1970. Phillips was a member of the Society of Jesus (the Jesuits), and was ordained a priest in 1965. His decision to become a Jesuit at age 17 was strongly affected by his viewing of the film The Keys of the Kingdom (1944) as a boy. Since 1970 Phillips had taught at Loyola University of Chicago. He had written or edited more than 20 books on filmmakers and film (see bibliography); several of these have been reviewed by major newspapers.

Phillips had served on juries at the Cannes, Berlin, and Chicago International Film Festivals. He had been a member of the editorial board for the journal Literature/Film Quarterly since its founding in 1973; this journal claims to be "the longest standing international journal devoted to the study of adaptation" (i.e. the adaptation of literature to film). Phillips had been a prolific author of biographical books on filmmakers, and had published extended interviews with many filmmakers including Alfred Hitchcock, Stanley Kubrick, Fritz Lang, and Joseph Losey. He was also a friend, champion and consultant for director Ken Russell, and author of the book Ken Russell (Twayne Publishers, 1979). Phillips was a consultant for The Devils (Russell, 1971) and famously defended the film against charges of blasphemy saying, in the documentary Hell On Earth - The Desecration and Resurrection of The Devils (Mark Kermode, 2002), that the film depicts blasphemy, although it is not itself blasphemous.

== Bibliography ==
- The Movie Makers: Artists in an Industry. Burnham Inc Pub. 1973. ISBN 978-0-911012-43-9.
- Graham Greene: Films of His Fiction. Teachers' College Press. 1974. ISBN 978-0-8077-2376-0.
- Stanley Kubrick: A Film Odyssey. Popular Library. 1977. ISBN 978-0-445-04101-1.
- Evelyn Waugh's Officers, Gentlemen, and Rogues: The Fact Behind His Fiction. Nelson-Hall Publishers. 1977. ISBN 978-0-88229-495-7. Reviewed by James F. Carens.
- Ken Russell. Twayne. 1979. ISBN 978-0-8057-9266-9.
- The Films of Tennessee Williams. Art Alliance Pr. 1980. ISBN 978-0-87982-025-1.
- Hemingway and Film. Ungar Publishing Co. 1980. ISBN 978-0-8044-6644-8.
- John Schlesinger. Twayne Publishers. 1981. ISBN 978-0-8057-9280-5.
- George Cukor. Twayne. 1982. ISBN 978-0-8057-9286-7.
- Alfred Hitchcock. Twayne. 1984. ISBN 978-0-8057-9301-7. Reviewed by Karen Jaehne. Subscription required.
- Fiction, Film and F. Scott Fitzgerald. Loyola University Press. 1986. ISBN 978-0-8294-0500-2.
- Conrad and Cinema: The Art of Adaptation. Peter Lang. 1997. ISBN 978-0-8204-3915-0.
- Exiles in Hollywood: Major European Film Directors in America. Lehigh University Press. 1998. ISBN 978-0-934223-49-2.
- Major Film Directors of the American and British Cinema. Lehigh University Press. 1999. ISBN 978-0-934223-59-1.
- Creatures of Darkness: Raymond Chandler, Detective Fiction, and Film Noir. University Press of Kentucky. 2000. ISBN 978-0-8131-9042-6. Reviewed by A. Mary Murphy.
- Fiction, Film, and Faulkner: The Art of Adaptation. Univ. of Tennessee Press. 2001. ISBN 978-1-57233-166-2.
- (editor) Stanley Kubrick: Interviews. University Press of Mississippi. 2001. ISBN 978-1-57806-297-3. - Wikipedia article on book: Fiction, Film, and Faulkner
- (edited with Rodney Hill) The Encyclopedia of Stanley Kubrick. Checkmark Books. 2002. ISBN 978-0-8160-4389-7. Reviewed by Richard Schickel.
- Godfather: The Intimate Francis Ford Coppola. University Press of Kentucky. 2004. ISBN 978-0-8131-2304-2. Reviewed by Richard Simon Chang.
- (edited with Rodney Hill) Francis Ford Coppola: Interviews. University Press of Mississippi. 2004. ISBN 978-1-57806-666-7.
- Beyond the Epic: The Life and Films of David Lean. University Press of Kentucky. 2006. ISBN 978-0-8131-2415-5. Reviewed by Gregory McNamee.
- Some Like It Wilder: The Life and Controversial Films of Billy Wilder. University Press of Kentucky. 2009. ISBN 978-0-8131-2570-1. Reviewed by Laurence Raw.
