= Harpya =

1979 film by Raoul Servais

- Title card
- Directed by: Raoul Servais
- Written by: Raoul Servais
- Starring: Will Spoor; Fran Waller Zeper
- Cinematography: Walter Smets
- Music by: Lucien Goethals
- Production company: Absolon Films
- Release dates: May 1979 (Cannes); March 1980 (France)
- Running time: 9 minutes
- Country: Belgium

Harpya is a 1979 Belgian short comedy horror film written and directed by Raoul Servais, which tells the story of a man (portrayed by Will Spoor) who tries to live with a harpy (portrayed by Fran Waller Zeper), a mythical being that is half woman and half bird of prey with an insatiable appetite. The nine-minutes-long film, which has no spoken dialogue, explores authority and domination, themes Servais had earlier addressed on a larger, societal level but here applied to a personal relationship.

Servais, who began to make animated short films in the 1950s, wanted to move away from the cartoon format and invented a new technique for combining animation and live action specifically for Harpya. The film was positively received by critics, won the Palme d'Or for Best Short Film at the 1979 Cannes Film Festival and gained international renown for its director. Servais abandoned the technique he used in Harpya because it was too time-consuming but continued to combine actors and animation in his later films.

== Plot ==
One night, in a city during the Belle Époque, a man with a moustache (Note: There is no dialogue in the film, but the protagonist's parrot calls out the name Oscar. Some published material refers to the man under that name.) is walking down a street when he hears the cries of a woman. He rushes towards the noise and finds a man strangling the woman in a fountain. The moustachioed man knocks out the assailant and discovers the woman is a harpy, a large, white bird of prey with the bald head and naked breasts of a woman. The man takes her to his home, where he lives with his parrot, to shelter and feed her.

During dinner, the man discovers the harpy's insatiable appetite: she flies to his table and eats all of his food, starving him. When he searches for something to eat, the harpy appears to have eaten his parrot and immediately flies up behind him, stealing any food he finds. When he attempts to leave the house, she overwhelms him and eats the lower part of his body, forcing him to move around on his arms.

The man plays music. When the record player gets stuck, the harpy is absorbed by the repetitive noise, giving him a chance to escape. He becomes attentive to sounds and briefly scared by a gargoyle, then finds a snack bar named Friture Gargantua. (Note: The name is a reference to the novel series Gargantua and Pantagruel by François Rabelais.) At the same time in the house, the record player stops. As the man eats chips in a park, the harpy finds him and eats his snack. The man is enraged and begins to strangle the harpy but a police officer hears her cries and knocks the man to the ground with his baton. The harpy looks at the officer in glee.

== Themes ==
Harpya explores authority, domination and oppression, themes that recur in the films of Raoul Servais. These themes are reflected in the story about the harpy who dominates the simple, middle-class protagonist, and in the film's atmosphere and dark colour scheme. Unlike the director's earlier films, which discuss domination in relation to society at large, Harpya approaches the theme on an individual level through a personal relationship. The film marks the beginning of a period during which self-exploration became central in Servais' filmmaking.

Together with Chromophobia (1966), Harpya stands out in Servais' filmography for its pessimistic tone. In interviews, Servais downplays its seriousness and describes it as a parody of the vampire genre, with no big, philosophical idea behind its story about a gentle, bourgeois man who invites a monster that devours him to his home. The film has been interpreted as misogynist but according to Servais, its target is domineering people in general rather than women in particular. Philippe Moins, a journalist and festival organiser who has written several books about Servais' works, says Servais is not a misogynist but the film can leave such an impression.

In an academic paper about Servais, Manuela Rosignoli says a theme of duality appears in many of the director's films, including Harpya. The harpy shares her partially human form with the mermaid in Servais' Siren (1968) and the motif of the half-human is emphasised when the protagonist in Harpya loses the bottom half of his body. Rosignoli traces this theme to Belgium's division between Dutch-language Flemish culture and French-language Walloon culture, and to the fact that Servais grew up speaking Dutch but has a French name and parents of Walloon origin.

== Production ==
Servais was established as a central figure in Belgian animation before he made Harpya. He made his first animated short film in 1959 and taught animation at the Royal Academy of Fine Arts in Ghent from 1966. In 1969, he co-founded the animation studio Pen-Film and in 1976, he co-created the Belgisch Animatiefilmcentrum (lit. 'Belgian Animation Film Centre'). Internationally, he had won festival awards including a prize at the 1966 Venice International Film Festival for Chromophobia and the Special Jury Prize at the 1972 Cannes Film Festival for Operation X-70.

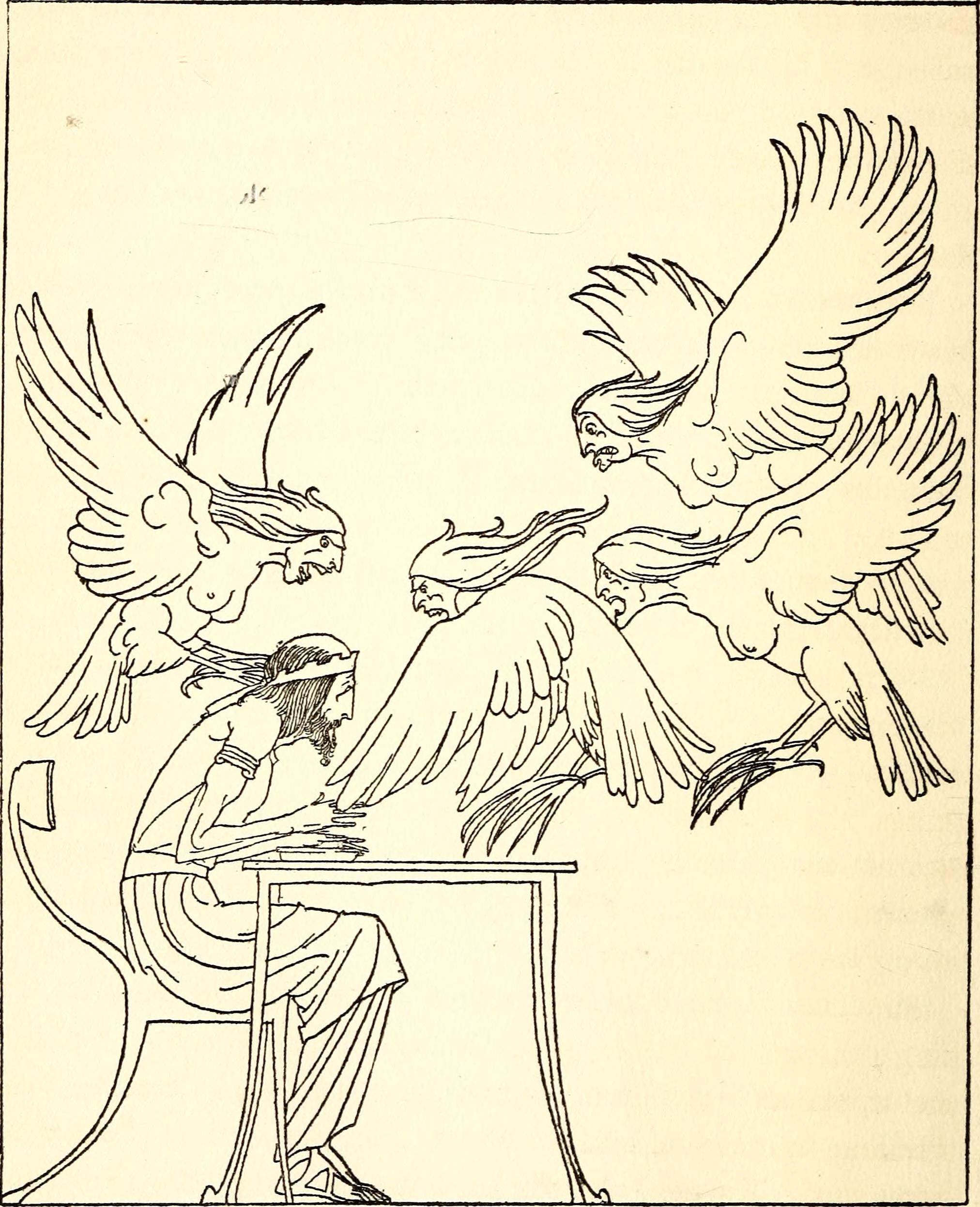
Phineus and the harpies, 1921 illustration by Willy Pogany

Servais came up with the story for Harpya after repeatedly waking up from nightmares one night. He envisioned it as a comedy horror film about a harpy. Harpies are for example known from the Greek poem Argonautica, which tells the story of Phineus, a cursed king tormented by harpies who stole his food and brought him to near starvation. Harpya is the third film, following Siren and Pegasus (1973), for which Servais drew material from mythology. Harpya was produced by Absolon Films and received support from the Flemish Government's Ministry of Culture.

Harpya marked a new technical development in Servais' career because it was the first time he combined animation with live actors. There are three actors in the film: Will Spoor as the man, Fran Waller Zeper as the harpy and Sjoert Schwibethus as the assailant. Servais said he had exhausted the possibilities of the traditional cartoon, having used drawing styles ranging from the simple to the complex, the spontaneous to visuals close to expressionist paintings from the interwar period, and he thought it was necessary to try something different. The process of finding a technique that suited the new vision took several months. Servais travelled to London to study special effects techniques used in contemporary commercial cinema but these were too expensive so he had to invent his own process.

Servais and the cinematographer Walter Smets filmed the actors at 24 frames per second against a black velvet background. The scene in which characters appear to move without using their legs was created by digging a ditch. For the animation part of the production, Servais created silhouette shapes made of Scotchlite corresponding to each frame of the actors. He placed the silhouettes on a layer in a multiplane camera setup and used a semi-transparent mirror in front of the camera to front-project the characters onto the plane. Through this process, which demanded high precision, he could use different planes for characters and surroundings, and film them frame by frame together. The process was very time-consuming, partially because Servais was the only person who knew how to use it and therefore had no help from assistants.

Servais says Harpya was visually influenced by the works of Flemish expressionist painters. Others have described it as being influenced by surrealist paintings, especially those of René Magritte, for whom Servais had worked in the 1950s. According to the journalist Wim de Poorter of Ons Erfdeel, the influence from Magritte is apparent in Harpya's sober scenery, soft colours and shadows in moonlight. The film historian Cinzia Bottini says the imagery of hats and an apple is reminiscent of Magritte's paintings. Servais says he has been influenced by surrealism and owes his understanding of the movement to Magritte but he feels closer to magic realist painters such as Paul Delvaux. Lucien Goethals created the electronic music score for Harpya.

== Release ==
Harpya competed at the 1979 Cannes Film Festival, which was held from 10 to 24 May. With a running time of nine minutes, it was the third time one of Servais' short films was selected for the festival; he had previously participated with Goldframe in 1969 and Operation X-70 in 1972. Harpya was subsequently shown out of competition at a series of other festivals, including the 1979 Annecy International Animation Film Festival. In March 1980, it was released in French cinemas as part of Mondocartoon, a programme of ten animated short films that were selected by Paul Dopff and Gabriel Cotto and distributed by Pink Splash with the tagline Palmarès du dessin animé mondial (transl. Award-winning world cartoons). Harpya was shown in the United States as part of the 1981 International Tournée of Animation.

Harpya has been available on home media since 1996, when Servais' short films were released on VHS. Servais' short films have been released on several DVDs; the earliest that includes Harpya was released by a Japanese company. In Europe, his short films have been collected on DVDs including one released by Folioscope and SFSL in 2004, and one released by Belgium's Cinematek in 2019.

== Reception ==
=== Critical response ===
Derek Hill of Sight & Sound and Poorter compared Harpya to Servais' previous films. Hill called it "by far the most complex" work Servais had done and Poorter wrote its pessimistic tone makes it stand out although its music contributes to an ironic and less serious side. Gilles Colpart of La Revue du cinéma wrote Harpya should be regarded as a masterpiece of animation, even by people who are uninterested in its "phantasmagoric universe". Le Monde's Jacques Siclier said it was the showpiece of Mondocartoon and called its painted scenery "astonishing". Gary Arnold of The Washington Post called it the "most astonishing" entry at the International Tournée of Animation, praised the tension it creates and said it successfully expresses a fear that "life will eat you alive".

Several reviews written in the 1970s and 1980s complimented the technical achievement that allowed Harpya to integrate animation and live action. John Halas described it as the director's most unique film because of its approach to technique and storytelling. According to Colpart, Harpya avoids becoming a technical demonstration while pushing the limits of the medium. Colpart also said Servais is one of a few people in animation who constantly question, replace or complicate their techniques, and that in Harpya he turned disparate elements into a fascinating whole.

Daniel Walber, writing for IndieWire in 2011 and MTV.com in 2013, called Harpya one of the best short films from the Cannes Film Festival's history. He highlighted the film's atmosphere, its resistance to interpretation and the character design of the harpy, describing the film as "haunting, a bit deranged, and entirely unforgettable". In 2017, David Cairns of Mubi's Notebook said the story in Harpya is reminiscent of "Jenifer" (2005), an episode of the television series Masters of Horror. He wrote although Harpya can be viewed as a misogynist fable, it does not strike him as offensive because it remains open to interpretation, uses dark humour and conveys a sense of confidence.

=== Accolades ===
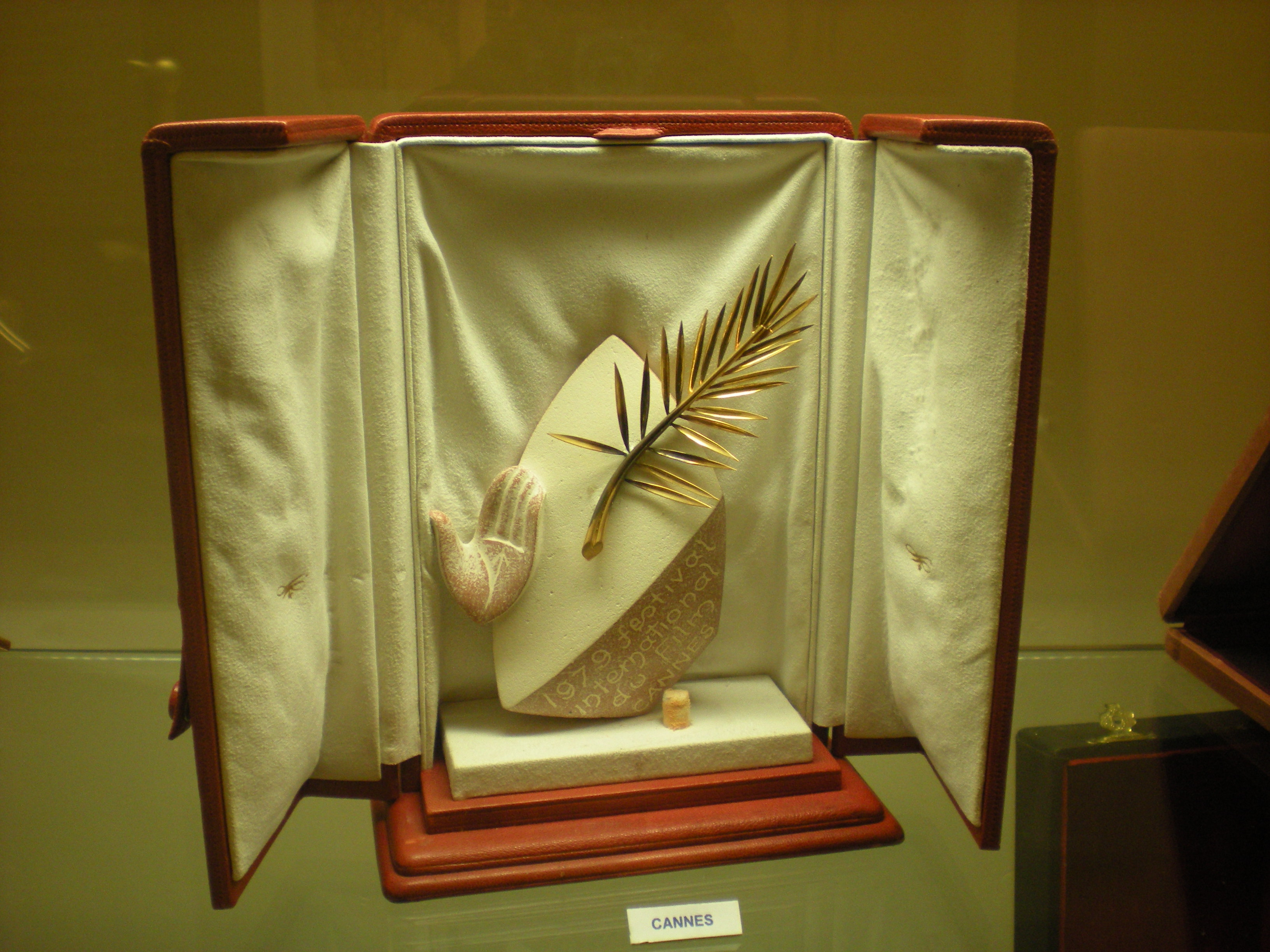
The 1979 Palme d'Or for Best Short Film

Harpya won the Palme d'Or for Best Short Film at the Cannes Film Festival. At the 1979 Annecy International Animation Film Festival, an international group of critics voted Harpya one of the twelve best animated films ever made. Servais described it as being awarded twice; first by the festival jury in Cannes and then by the critics. Harpya received the 1980 Sant Jordi Award for Best Foreign Short Film from the Catalan branch of Radio Nacional de España. In 1984, Harpya finished in 22nd place in the Olympiad of Animation, a poll to determine the greatest animated films of all time that was organised by ASIFA-Hollywood and the Academy of Motion Picture Arts and Sciences as part of the Olympic Arts Festival. In 2006, an international jury of 30 animation experts voted Harpya the 14th best animated film of all time. It was voted one of the ten best animated films of the 20th century in a 2010 poll organised by the Etiuda&Anima International Film Festival to celebrate the 50th anniversary of the International Animated Film Association.

== Legacy ==
Harpya's positive reception and its Palme d'Or win gave Servais international renown, and prompted more film festivals to invite him onto their competition juries. Several film schools invited him to teach at their animation departments. Although Servais did not reuse the animation technique from Harpya, responses to the film encouraged him to continue combining animation and live action, notably in his only feature film Taxandria (1994). He describes the technique from Harpya as the precursor to a quicker process he developed soon afterwards and patented as servaisgraphy, which he intended to use in Taxandria but producers and financiers chose a more conventional combination of live action and animated special effects. Servaisgraphy was later used in the short film Nocturnal Butterflies (1997). Moins describes Harpya as a transitional film because it points out the direction Servais would take in his later works but is based on gag humour like his early films. It was selected for the Cannes Classics section at the 2017 Cannes Film Festival, one of seven films in a programme about the history of short films at the festival.

== See also ==
- Jenifer
- List of films based on classical mythology
- List of films with live action and animation
