= Siren (1968 film) =

1968 film by Raoul Servais

- Directed by: Raoul Servais
- Written by: Raoul Servais
- Music by: Lucien Goethals
- Production company: Absolon Films
- Release date: 1968
- Running time: 10 minutes
- Country: Belgium

Siren (Dutch: Sirene) is a 1968 Belgian animated short film written and directed by Raoul Servais. Set in a harbour city dominated by mechanical beasts and reason, it is about the encounter between a boy and a mermaid. The nine and a half minutes long film was produced with support from the Flemish Community and received a number of awards at international film festivals.

== Plot ==
In a harbour, large mechanical cranes lift boxes full of weapons while behaving like aggressive beasts. Flying reptiles circle in the sky and steal from a lone fisherman's catch, which consists solely of fishbones. A cabin boy at a ship plays flute and his music attracts a mermaid to the surface, but the cranes aggressively sink their hooks and claws into the water and she tries to escape. One of the cranes captures her, lifts her high into the air and drops her to the quayside. The fisherman rushes to a phonebooth and calls for emergency service, prompting policemen and government officials to examine the already dead mermaid. They destroy the fisherman's fishing permit and arrest him. Two vans arrive: an ambulance and one with "zoo" written on it, and their respective personnel begin to fight over the mermaid's body. A man representing the law cuts her body in half, allowing the ambulance to leave with her human upper body and the zoo workers with her fishtail. The boy goes to the white outline initially drawn around the mermaid's dead body and draws his own image next to it, holding her hand. The contour of a ship forms in the starry sky, picks up the drawn figures and flies away with them as the boy plays his flute.

== Themes ==
The story in Siren is told on two levels, where reality and dramatic action are represented by red colours, and dreams, the romantic and the sentimental by blue colours. Manuela Rosignoli wrote in a 2006 academic paper that Siren uses a theme of duality, represented by the half-human mermaid, that runs through much of Raoul Servais' filmography and which she traces to Belgium's division between Dutch-language Flemish and French-language Walloon culture. This theme is for example also reflected in the half-human, half-bird title figure of Servais' 1979 film Harpya.

== Production ==
Siren was made short after Belgium's Ministry of Culture had been split into two, one each for the Flemish and French Communities. The Flemish Ministry of Culture approached Servais, who was an established figure in Belgian animation and a teacher at the Royal Academy of Fine Arts in Ghent, with the prospect of making what became Siren. The film was written and directed by Servais and produced through Absolon Films with backing from the Flemish Community.

The set designs for Siren were created by Norbert Desyn. Servais did almost all the animation work himself. Lucien Goethals, a regular collaborator of Servais, composed the musical score. The film has a running time of 9 minutes and 30 seconds.

== Reception ==
Siren premiered in 1968 and was shown at film festival in Europe, Asia, North America and Australia, where it received critical acclaim. Servais travelled to Iran for the film's screening at the 1969 Tehran International Film Festival and met the Shahbanu Farah Pahlavi.

Siren received the following festival awards:

- 1968: Silver Pelican at the Mamaia International Animation Film Festival
- 1969: Grand Prize for Animation Film at the Tehran International Film Festival
- 1969: Film Critics' Prize at the Tehran International Film Festival
- 1969: Silver Boomerang at the Melbourne International Film Festival
- 1969: Richard Declerck Award, Grand Prix at the Belgian National Film Festival
- 1969: Best Colour Film at the Belgian National Film Festival
- 1970: Silver Hugo, First Prize for Animation Film at the Chicago International Film Festival
- 1970: First Prize at the Philadelphia International Film Festival

== See also ==
- Mermaids in popular culture
- Siren (mythology)
