= Illumination Rounds =

- Short story by Michael Herr
- Country: United States
- Language: English
- Genre: Essay

Publication
- Published in: New American Review #7
- Media type: Print
- Publication date: 1969

"Illumination Rounds" is an essay by journalist Michael Herr originally appearing in New American Review #7 (1969) and first collected in Dispatches (1977) by Alfred A. Knopf.

An early and outstanding example of the New Journalism, Herr's rendering of his experience as a Vietnam War correspondent was a critical success.

"Illumination Rounds" was included in The Best American Essays of the Century (2000). Though this non-fiction anthology generally omitted journalistic writings, editor Joyce Carol Oates made an exception for Herr's piece.

The title of the essay refers to mortar illumination devices used to expose enemy positions during night missions.

== Synopsis ==
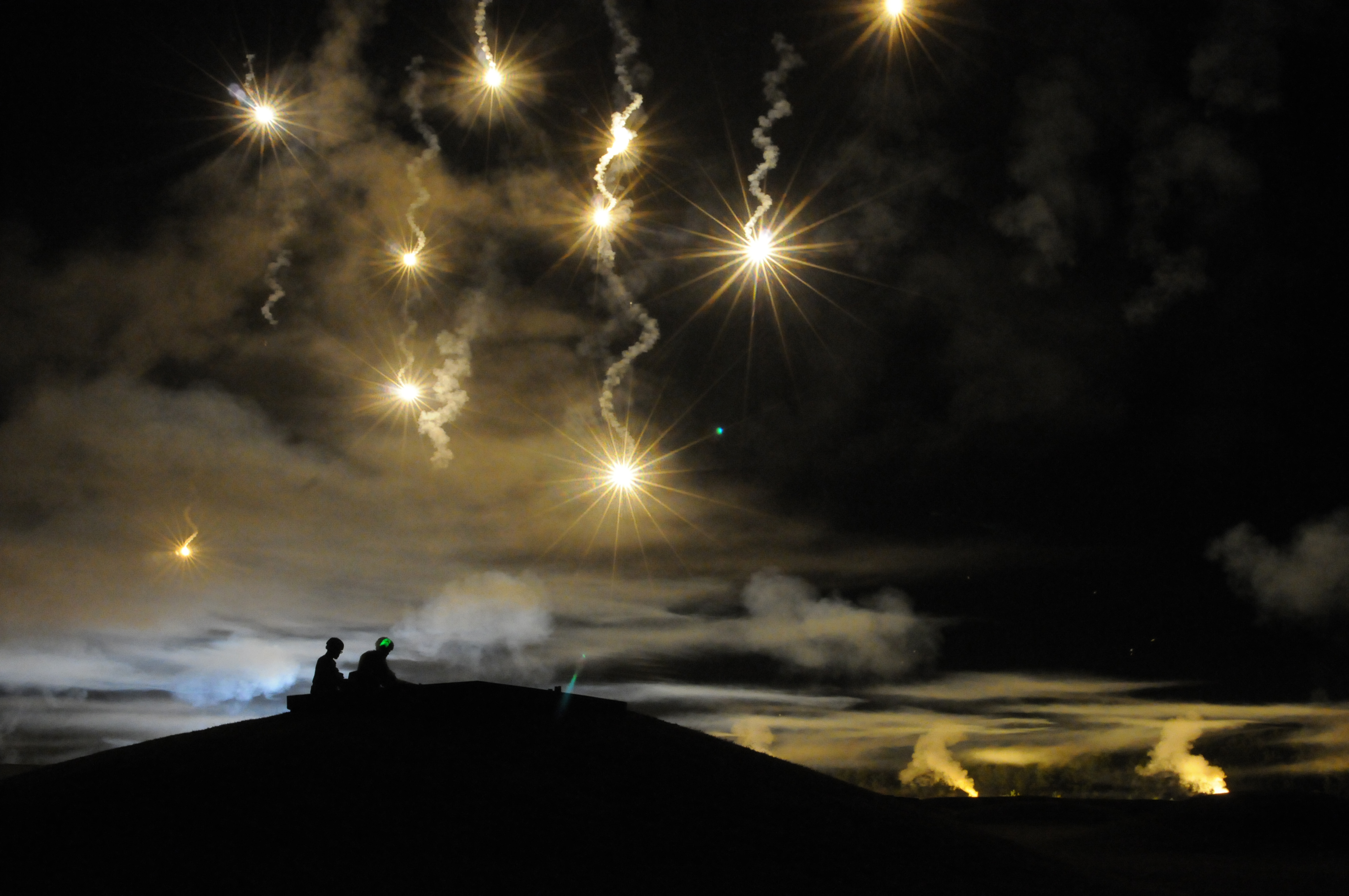
Illumination rounds.

The essay—"a hybrid of memoir and fiction"—is written in a narrative form known as New Journalism. The reportage comprises twenty vignettes or passages describing events Herr witnessed or recorded from informants during his deployment to Vietnam from November 1967 to 1969 as a war correspondent for Esquire. These vignettes are delineated by a double space and run from a few dozen to several hundred words in length.

Herr acknowledged that the material in Dispatches, including "Illumination Rounds", is a literary and journalistic amalgamation of his combat experiences: ""Everything in Dispatches happened for me, even if it didn't necessarily happen to me."

Herr uses military initialisms and acronyms for brevity: EM (enlisted man, AVRN (Army of the Republic of Vietnam), lz (landing zone), and LOH (light observation helicopter), etc.

== Critical assessment ==
"We were strapped into the seats of the Chinook, fifty of us, and something, someone was hitting it from the outside with an enormous hammer. How do they do that? I thought, we're a thousand feet in the air!"

In the Introduction to the 2009 Everyman Library edition of Dispatches (1977), Robert Stone recalls his first encounter with the work of fellow journalist Herr while covering the Vietnam War in Saigon in 1971:

That afternoon Judy Coburn, The Nation's correspondent in Saigon, had given me a copy of the New American Review that contained a section of reportage by Michael Herr, who had come to Vietnam on assignment for Esquire magazine...[T]he passages of Herr's work were entitled Illumination Rounds. The title itself seized the mind's eye in a moment, moved a reader into a dark space inside himself where remembered parachute flares spread their whiter-than-white slow descending light and the red or green tracer rounds could suggest a celebration.

== Sources ==
- Gross, Terry. "Remembering Michael Herr, Whose 'Dispatches' Brought The War In Vietnam Home". National Public Radio, Recorded June 28, 2016. NPR provides transcript of 1990 interview with Micheal Herr. Accessed July 2, 2025.
- Oates, Joyce Carol and Atwan, Robert. 2000. The Best American Essays of the Century. pp. 327-341. Joyce Carol Oates, editor, Robert Atwan co-editor. Houghton Mifflin Company, New York ISBN 978-0-618-15587-3
- Stone, Robert. "How Michael Herr Transcended New Journalism". Literary Hub, June 28, 2016. Accessed July 23, 2025.
