= Frans Geysen =

Belgian composer (1936–2026)

- Geysen, c. 2016
- Born: 29 July 1936; Oostham, Belgium
- Died: 18 October 2026 (aged 90); De Panne, Belgium
- Education: Lemmensinstituut; Royal Conservatoire Antwerp; Ghent Conservatory
- Occupations: Composer; Academic teacher; Writer
- Organizations: Lemmensinstituut; Royal Conservatory Brussels

Frans Geysen (29 July 1936 – 18 October 2026) was a Belgian composer, academic teacher and a writer on music topics. He developed a canonic-repetitive style, independently from American minimalism and different. He composed theatrical works, choral and chamber music, some orchestral works and many pieces for recorders, piano, organ, and carillon. His music has been described as abstract and exploring a "purposeful monotony". He taught for decades at both the Lemmensinstituut and the Royal Conservatory.

== Life and career ==
Frans Geysen was born in Oostham on 29 July 1936. He studied organ and music education at the Lemmensinstituut in Mechelen, and further music history with Jan L. Broeckx at the Ghent and counterpoint with J. Mestdagh at the Royal Conservatoire Antwerp. In 1962 he became professor of harmony and advanced analysis at the Lemmensinstituut, remaining until 1999, and he taught at the Royal Conservatory in Brussels from 1975 to 1997.

Geysen attended the Darmstädter Ferienkurse in 1965 and took part in festivals for contemporary music in the 1960s and 1970s. He began in 1972 to publish essays, analyses, as well as reviews of scores, recordings and books in periodicals such as Adem and Muziekkrant. Some of his compositions for the carillon school in Mechelen earned prizes between 1973 and 1985, including the Jef Denyn Prize in 1973 for Clock-wise. His recorder quartet Periferisch-Diagonaal-Concentrisch, written in 1972, was published by Schott Music in 1975. His video opera Orpheus is in ons, composed in 1988 combining instrumental music and large-scale choral works, for narrator, mezzo-soprano, bass-baritone, bass, mixed choir and an ensemble of ten instruments, premiered at the Lemmensinstituut on 13 February 1992, conducted by Piet Swerts. He composed Staalkaarten voor een hoboconcert (Samplings for an oboe concerto) in 1991 on a commission from the Royal Philharmonic Orchestra of Flanders, the first time that he applied his compositional approach for a large ensemble. Several of his works were recorded. Most of his works and manuscripts are held by the Royal Conservatory.

Geysen died on 18 October 2026, at the age of 90.

== Music ==
Geysen began to compose in 1958, at first choral music in a "post-expressionist" style. In 1962 Geysen started using serial techniques, but in 1967 turned against their rhythmic aperiodicity and discontinuity. Instead, he developed a canonic-repetitive style, independently of American minimalism, from which it differed in several ways: it features rapid process, is not consonant and comes without a meditative aura found in works by Philip Glass and Steve Reich. Geysen retained the constructivism of serial thinking, and he continued to use twelve-tone rows in his music, utilizing rows lacking thirds, perfect fifths, and semitones, in order to avoid suggestions of tonality and mutual attraction between pitches.

In 1972, he published the composition In de Spiegel (In the Mirror) in the February issue of Adem. He called for a music "divested of anything superfluous, unimportant or trivial". His music is abstract, excluding emotion as either expression or goal. He explored a purposeful monotony, inspired by the monotony of the landscape of Flanders—and especially its easternmost province, Limburg, where he grew up. His compositions include theatrical works, choral and chamber music, the orchestral Staalkaarten voor een hoboconcert (1991), and many works for recorders, piano, organ, and carillon.

== Writings ==
Articles published by Geysen include:

- 1968. "Prognose voor een eucharistieviering". Adem: Tweemaandelijks tijdschrift voor liturgische muziek 2:50–53.
- 1974. "Eigen compositorische bevindingen in vergelijking met het werk van de jonge Amerikaanse school". Adem: Driemaandelijks tijdschrift voor musikalischen Volkskunde 10, no. 1 (Jan–Feb): 24–30.
- 1977. "De spiraalgedachte van Stockhausen en anderer componisten". Adem: Driemaandelijks tijdschrift voor musikalischen Volkskunde 13, no. 3:130–33.
- 1981. "Olivier Messiaens Cinq réchants, een analytische benadering". Adem: Driemaandelijks tijdschrift voor musikalischen Volkskunde 17, no. 5 (Nov–Dec): 246–50.
- 1982. "Sporen der Middeleeuwen in hedendaagse Franse koormuziek". Adem: Driemaandelijks tijdschrift voor musikalischen Volkskunde 18, no. 1 (Jan–Feb): 26–28.
- 1982. "Sporen der Renaissance in hedendaagse Europese koormuziek". Adem: Driemaandelijks tijdschrift voor musikalischen Volkskunde 18, no. 2 (Mar–Apr): 71–73.
- 1982. "Sporen van de barok in de 20ste-eeuwse muziek". Adem: Driemaandelijks tijdschrift voor musikalischen Volkskunde 18, no. 3:128–31.
- 1982. "Sporen van het Classicistisch modulatiemodel in muziek van deze tijd". Adem: Driemaandelijks tijdschrift voor musikalischen Volkskunde 18, no. 4 (Sept–Oct): 181–85.
- 1982. "Sporen van Romantiek in muziek van deze tijd". Adem: Driemaandelijks tijdschrift voor musikalischen Volkskunde 18, no. 5 (Nov–Dec): 241–48.
- 1984. "Plastische Kunsten en Muziek van deze eeuw: Parallellie in de inspiratie, werkwijze, resultaat?" Adem: Driemaandelijks tijdschrift voor musikalischen Volkskunde 20, no. 1 (Jan–Feb): 15–20.
- 1985. "Bach en het actuele componeren". Adem: Driemaandelijks tijdschrift voor musikalischen Volkskunde 21, no. 1 (Jan–Mar): 21–24.
- 1985. "Wat Bach je doet? Een eindeloze cadens". Adem: Driemaandelijks tijdschrift voor musikalischen Volkskunde 21, no. 3 (July–September): 140–44.
- 1986. "Het orgeloeuvre van Lucien Goethals". Orgelkunst 9, no. 2 (June):29–37. OCLC 1113318707
- 1987. "Ken het orgel een hedendaags componist nog in zijn ban houden?" Orgelkunst 10, no. 3 (Sept): 21–31. OCLC 1113831881
- 1988. "Analyse: Met het oog of met het oor?" Adem: Driemaandelijks tijdschrift voor musikalischen Volkskunde 24, no. 1 (Jan–Mar): 28–30.
- 1993. "Vier orgelstukken (1988–1992) of de niet aflatende verrukking". Orgelkunst 16, no. 3:124–37. OCLC 1113388289
- 1994. "Bachs Preludium en Fuga in a". Orgelkunst 17, no. 1:21–34. OCLC 1113840518
- 2000. "Lucien Goethals' muziek voor orgel-solo". Revue belge de musicologie/Belgisch tijdschrift voor muziekwetenschap 54 (Liber amicorum Lucien Goethals): 179–88. OCLC 5546323730

== Compositions ==
Geysen's compositions include:

=== Music theatre ===
- Orpheus is in ons, television-opera in 4 acts, libretto: Hedwig Speliers and Stefaan Decostere (1988)
- Vuurvast, music theatre (1993)
- Wildzang, music theatre (1995)

=== Solo vocal ===
- 's Morgens is den riep zo kold, for voice and two flutes (1969)
- Gespiegelte, for female voice and organ (1971)
- De lange tijd, for tenor and ensemble of early instruments (1975)
- Baadstertjes van biscuit, for soprano and piano (1998)

=== Choral ===
- Elementair, for a cappella choir (1969)
- Sine Nomine, for a cappella mixed choir (1971)
- Tunnel, for a cappella choir (1978)
- Als in roze mist, for a cappella choir (1979)
- In, for a cappella choir (1979)
- Doe, for a cappella choir (1981)
- Ma weeral, for mixed choir (1981)
- Ballade van geen enkeling, for choir (1983)
- Het gejuich der intervallen, for a cappella choir (1987)
- In stromen van fysisch licht, for a cappella choir (1992)
- Vaarwel, for mixed choir (1993)
- (Extravagant articuleren als sublimerende taalautomaten), for a cappella choir (1995)
- Dit heeft geen naam, for a cappella choir (1998)
- Alles komt terug 1, for SATB choir (1999)
- Alles komt terug 2, for three-part choir (2000)
- Alles komt terug 3, for SSATB choir (2000)
- Alles heeft zijn tijd 7, for four-part mixed choir (or string quartet, or trumpet, oboe, clarinet, and bassoon) (2000)

=== Orchestra ===
- Wentelingen, for chamber orchestra (1989)
- Staalkaarten voor een hoboconcert, for oboe and orchestra (1991)
- Alles heeft zijn tijd 1, for orchestra (2000)

=== Chamber music ===
- Slegov Erar, for recorder, violin, cello, and piano (1972)
- Titel-loos, for flute, violin, viola, and cello (1975)
- String Quintet, for 2 violins, viola, cello, and double bass (1976)
- Omtrent sib, for three oboes (1977)
- Stadssteeg, for 6 oboes, 4 trumpets, 2 trombones (1977)
- Hall-wand, for 5 trumpets and 3 trombones (1979)
- Omtrent h-c, for flute, oboe, clarinet, bassoon, trumpet, horn, trombone, and double bass (1979)
- Jef Verheyen, le peintre flamant, for 5 trombones (1980)
- Lappen-stuk, for harmonica, violin, double bass, piano, flute, oboe, clarinet, horn, bassoon (1980)
- Brass Quintet (1981)
- Grensverleggend grijs, for xylophone and marimba (1983)
- Late spiegels, for flute, oboe, piano and double bass (1984)
- Wind Quintet, for flute, oboe, clarinet, horn, and bassoon (1989)
- In het teken van de vertikale gloed, for six saxophones (1992)
- Woekering tot aan de grens, for recorder and piano or harpsichord (1992)
- Niet elke minuut duurt even lang, for recorder and marimba (1993)
- Stemmingen, for trumpet and organ (1994)
- Stemmingen temeer, for trumpet and organ (1994)
- Erste begegnung, for tenor recorder and piano (1995)
- Prille ontmoeting, for tenor recorder and piano (1995)
- Le charme des impossibilités, for flute, violin and keyboard (1997)
- Energie ter plekke 1, for recorder quartet and string orchestra or string quartet (1997)
- Energie ter plekke 2, for brass quintet (1997)
- Energie ter plekke 4, for brass ensemble (1997)
- Tijdsrekking, for alto recorder and piano or harpsichord (1999)
- Alles heeft zijn tijd 7, for four-part mixed choir or string quartet or trumpet, oboe, clarinet, and bassoon (2000)
- Alles heeft zijn tijd 9, for 4 trumpets (2000)
- Op de fles, for four players on 16 bottles (2001)
- Vooralsnog, for horn, trumpet, trombone, and tuba (2004)

==== String quartet ====
- Alles heeft zijn tijd 2 (2000)
- Alles heeft zijn tijd 3 (2000)
- Alles heeft zijn tijd 6 (2000)
- Alles heeft zijn tijd 7, for four-part mixed choir (or string quartet, or trumpet, oboe, clarinet, and bassoon) (2000)
- Möbiusband 15 (2001)
- Met gekend elan, for tenor recorder (or flute or oboe), and organ (2002)
- Niettegenstaande (2003)

==== Recorder ensemble ====
- F′′, for 12 recorders (1970)
- MAM, for recorder quartet (1972)
- Nonak, for recorder quartet (1972)
- Periferisch-Diagonaal-Concentrisch, for recorder quartet (1972)
- Wingerd in een natte zomer, for two recorders (1974)
- Vier korte stukken, for two recorders (1976)
- Installaties [De Stockmansinstallaties], for recorder quartet (1983)
- Omtrent a-b-c, for recorder quintet (1984)
- Digitaal-Analoog-Identiek, for recorder duo, trio, and quartet (1986)
- Koken, for two recorders (1990)
- Langs hoeken en kanten, for recorder quartet (1990)
- Groot kwartetboek, 15 movements for recorder quartet (1992)
- Ottoflotto, for double recorder quartet (1995)
- Lichtspleten, for recorder quartet (1996)
- Met zijn twaalven, for twelve recorders (2001)
- Nevel tot leven, for recorder trio (2002)
- 15 Duette, for two recorders (2003)
- Noodzaak van ommekeer—ommekeer van noodzaak, for recorder quartet (2004)

==== Percussion ensemble ====
- De volheid der tijden, for 3 × 3 drums (1981)
- Monolieten 1, for three percussionists (1990)
- Monolieten 2, for percussion ensemble (1990)
- Met vel, rand en tand, for three percussionists (2001)

=== Solo instrumental ===
==== Piano ====
- Al op enen wintersen dag (2004)
- Denkbare muziek, for piano (1982)
- Endeavour, for piano (1971)
- Evident, efficiënt, consequent, for piano (1993)
- Fries (1981)
- Karel Goeyvaerts–Memoriaal, for piano (1994)
- Muziek voor toetsenbord, for piano (1977)
- Muziek voor toetsenbord 2, for piano (1999–2000)
- Voorstuk in paars (1990)
- Waarheen?, for piano (1998)
- Waarom niet nog? (2006)
- Wereld van volheid (1992)

==== Carillon ====
- Alles komt terug 4 (2000)
- Aug-Dim (1985)
- Clock-wise (1973)
- Drieluik (1994)
- Media vita (1982)
- Onstuitbaar-onweerlegbaar (1999)
- De overbodige illusies (1996)
- Playing the Bells out of Tower (1978)
- Probabiliter (1983)

==== Organ ====
- Caleidoscopia musica (2003)
- Crypta musica per florentini organum (1991)
- De gestage groei (1992)
- De grote variatie (1975)
- Herman Roelstraete–Memoriaal (1989)
- In nomine (1978)
- De klank van ruis (1974)
- Orgelstuk (1977)
- Twee-delingen (1999)
- Twee orgels, for two organs (1984)

==== Unspecified keyboard instrument ====
- A + B = A/B (1984)
- Alles heeft zijn tijd 4 (2000)
- Alles heeft zijn tijd 5 (2000)
- Alles heeft zijn tijd 8 (2000)
- Alles komt terug 5 (2000)
- Benadering van de kern (2000)
- Evident, efficient, consequent (1993)
- 50 x Hedwig Speliers (1985)
- Intuitief, wel standvastig (1993)
- Toetsenstuk voor Lucien Goethals (1996)
- Toetsing (2000)
- Tonen-Trappenhuisje voor Hanne (1984)
- Wereld van volheid (1992)

==== Wind instruments ====
- City of Smiles, twenty solos for one recorder player, playing soprano to bass (2001)
- Ehrung an M.C.E. (E=mc^{2}), for alto recorder (2001)
- Geproesterol, for alto recorder (1994)
- Jef Verheyen–Memoriaal, for trombone (1989)
- Kleine vegetatie, for alto recorder (1974)
- Pentakel, for oboe (1977)
- Solo, for alto recorder (1992)
- Solo per solum, for bassoon (1992)
- Stuk in groen, for clarinet (1990)

==== String instruments ====
- Solo per solam, for violin (1991)

==== Percussion ====
- Kataloog in grijs 1, for marimba (1984)

=== Electronic music ===
- Voorlopige stadia van een gegeometriseerde tijd, for tape (1989)
