= An Adventure for Two =

1979 film by Claude Lelouch

- French theatrical release poster
- French: À nous deux
- Directed by: Claude Lelouch
- Written by: Claude Lelouch
- Produced by: Claude Lelouch; Denis Héroux; Joseph F. Beaubien
- Starring: Catherine Deneuve; Jacques Dutronc; Jacques Villeret; Paul Préboist; Jacques Godin
- Cinematography: Bernard Zitzermann
- Edited by: Sophie Bhaud
- Music by: Francis Lai
- Production companies: Les Films 13; Cinévidéo
- Distributed by: AMLF (France)
- Release dates: 23 May 1979 (Cannes); 6 September 1979 (Toronto)
- Running time: 112 minutes
- Countries: France; Canada
- Language: French

An Adventure for Two (French: À nous deux, lit. 'Between the Two of Us') is a 1979 crime and romance film written, directed and produced by Claude Lelouch. It was screened out of competition at the 1979 Cannes Film Festival.

== Cast ==
- Catherine Deneuve as Françoise
- Jacques Dutronc as Simon Lacassaigne
- Jacques Villeret as Tonton Musique
- Paul Préboist as Mimile
- Bernard Le Coq as photographer (as Bernard Lecoq)
- Gilberte Géniat as Zézette
- Jacques Godin as Major Strauss
- Monique Mélinand as Françoise's mother
- Émile Genest as American chief of police
- Jean-François Rémi as Françoise's father
- Bernard Crombey as Alain (as Bernard Crommbey)
- Daniel Auteuil as thug
- John Boylan as highway patrol

== Production ==
Us Two was a French and Canadian co-production, with 75% of the funding from the Paris-based Les Films 13 and 25% from the Montreal-based Cinévidéo.

== Release ==
An Adventure for Two was first shown out of competition at the Cannes Film Festival in France on May 23, 1979 where it was the closing event for the festival. It was shown in Canada at the 1979 Toronto International Film Festival on September 6, 1979. It was distributed in Quebec by Ciné 360 and Creswin Film and Distribution outside Quebec in Canada with subtitles as An Adventure for Two.

The authors of French Thrillers of the 1970s: Volume I, Crime Films (2026) described the box office for the film in France as being disappointing, with only 686,000 spectators.
