= Stefano Madia =

Italian actor

- As Marco in Dear Father
- Born: 31 December 1954; Rome, Italy
- Died: 16 December 2004 (aged 49); Rome, Italy
- Occupation: Actor
- Years active: 1978–1993

Stefano Madia (31 December 1954 – 16 December 2004) was an Italian film actor. He appeared in twelve films between 1978 and 1993. At the 1979 Cannes Film Festival he won the award for Best Supporting Actor, for Vittorio Gassman's film Dear Father.

He is the father of Italian minister Marianna Madia.

== Filmography ==
Year	Title	Role	Notes
1979	Ernesto	Ernesto's friend Andrea	
1979	Dear Father	Marco Millozza	
1979	Life Is Beautiful	Pako	
1980	Savage Breed	Umberto Saraceni	
1982	Vigili e vigilesse	Nieddu Gavino	
1986	The Devil's Honey	Johnny	
1986	Camping del Terrore	Tony	
1990	The Palermo Connection		
1991	Reflections in a Dark Sky	Friend of Chim	
1993	Oltre la notte		Uncredited, (final film role)
