= Reflections in a Dark Sky =

- Directed by: Salvatore Maira
- Written by: Salvatore Maira; Massimo Franciosa; Luisa Montagnana
- Cinematography: Alfio Contini
- Release date: 1991
- Country: Italy
- Language: Italian

Reflections in a Dark Sky (Italian: Riflessi in un cielo scuro) is a 1991 Italian drama film written and directed by Salvatore Maira.

== Cast ==
- Françoise Fabian as Valeria
- Anna Kanakis as Chim
- Valerie Perrine as Caterina
- Peter Stormare as Carlo
- Maurizio Donadoni as Mario
- Brigitte Christensen as Sister Angela
- Stefano Madia as Friend of Chim
- Bettina Giovannini as Alice
- Vittorio Mezzogiorno
