= 1979 Cannes Film Festival =

- Official poster of the 32nd Cannes Film Festival, adapted from an original illustration by Belgian artist Jean-Michel Folon.
- Opening film: Hair
- Closing film: An Adventure for Two
- Location: Cannes, France
- Founded: 1946
- Awards: Palme d'Or: Apocalypse Now; The Tin Drum
- No. of films: 21 (In Competition)
- Festival date: 10 May 1979 – 24 May 1979
- Website: festival-cannes.com/en

Cannes Film Festival
- 1980 1978

The 32nd Cannes Film Festival took place from 10 to 24 May 1979. French writer Françoise Sagan served as jury president for the main competition.

The Palme d'Or, the festival's top prize, was jointly awarded to Apocalypse Now by Francis Ford Coppola (screened as a work in progress), and The Tin Drum by Volker Schlöndorff.

Sagan, raised a controversy as she complained about Robert Favre Le Bret, director of the festival, pressure on the jury for the choice of Coppola's film, while she had chosen Schlöndorff's film.

The festival opened with Hair by Miloš Forman, and closed with An Adventure for Two by Claude Lelouch.

== Jury ==
=== Main Competition ===
- Françoise Sagan, French writer - Jury President
- Sergio Amidei, Italian writer
- Rodolphe-Maurice Arlaud, Swiss
- Luis García Berlanga, Spanish filmmaker
- Maurice Bessy, French
- Paul Claudon, French producer
- Jules Dassin, American filmmaker
- Zsolt Kézdi-Kovács, Hungarian filmmaker
- Robert Rozhdestvensky, Soviet author
- Susannah York, British actress

== Official selection ==
=== In Competition ===
The following feature films competed for the Palme d'Or:

English title	Original title	Director(s)	Production country
Apocalypse Now		Francis Ford Coppola	United States
The Brontë Sisters	Les Sœurs Brontë	André Téchiné	France
The China Syndrome		James Bridges	United States
Days of Heaven		Terrence Malick	United States
Dear Father	Caro papà	Dino Risi	Italy
The Europeans		James Ivory	United Kingdom
Hungarian Rhapsody	Magyar rapszódia	Miklós Jancsó	Hungary
The Hussy	La drôlesse	Jacques Doillon	France
My Brilliant Career		Gillian Armstrong	Australia
Next of Kin	Arven	Anja Breien	Norway
Norma Rae		Martin Ritt	United States
Occupation in 26 Pictures	Okupacija u 26 slika	Lordan Zafranović	Yugoslavia
Série noire		Alain Corneau	France
Siberiade	Сибириада	Andrei Konchalovsky	Soviet Union
The Survivors	Los sobrevivientes	Tomás Gutiérrez Alea	Cuba
The Tin Drum	Die Blechtrommel	Volker Schlöndorff	West Germany, France, Yugoslavia, Poland
Traffic Jam	L'ingorgo - Una storia impossibile	Luigi Comencini	Italy
Victoria		Bo Widerberg	Sweden, West Germany
Without Anesthesia	Bez znieczulenia	Andrzej Wajda	Poland
Woman Between Wolf and Dog	Een vrouw tussen hond en wolf	André Delvaux	Belgium, France
Woyzeck		Werner Herzog	West Germany

=== Un Certain Regard ===
The following films were selected for the Un Certain Regard section:

English title	Original title	Director(s)	Production country
Come and Work	Fad'jal	Safi Faye	Senegal
Companys, procés a Catalunya	Companys, proceso a Cataluña	Josep Maria Forn	Spain
Encore un Hiver (short)		Françoise Sagan	France
From the Clouds to the Resistance	Dalla nube alla resistenza	Jean-Marie Straub and Danièle Huillet	Italy
Moments	רגעים	Michal Bat-Adam	Israel, France
A Nice Neighbor	A kedves szomszéd	Zsolt Kézdi-Kovács	Hungary
Les petites fugues		Yves Yersin	Switzerland
Printemps en Février		Shei Tieli	China
A Scream from Silence	Mourir à tue-tête	Anne Claire Poirier	Canada
Spirit of the Wind		Ralph Liddle	United States
The Third Generation	Die dritte Generation	Rainer Werner Fassbinder	West Germany
Ward Six	Paviljon VI	Lucian Pintilie	Yugoslavia

=== Out of Competition ===
The following films were selected to be screened out of competition:

English title	Original title	Director(s)	Production country
Christ Stopped at Eboli	Cristo si è fermato a Eboli	Francesco Rosi	Italy, France
Hair (opening film)		Miloš Forman	United States, West Germany
Manhattan		Woody Allen	United States
Le Musee du Louvre		Toshio Uruta	Japan
Orchestra Rehearsal	Prova d'orchestra	Federico Fellini	Italy, West Germany
An Adventure for Two (closing film)	À nous deux	Claude Lelouch	France, Canada
Wise Blood		John Huston	United States, West Germany

=== Short Films Competition ===
The following short films competed for the Short Film Palme d'Or:

- Barbe bleue by Olivier Gillon
- Bum by Břetislav Pojar
- La Dame de Monte Carlo by Dominique Delouche
- La Festa dels bojos by Lluis Racionero Grau
- Harpya by Raoul Servais
- Helping Hand by John P. Taylor, Zlatko Pavlinovic
- Le Mur by Jan January Janczak
- Petite histoire un peu triste by Didier Pourcel
- Põld by Rein Raamat
- The Waltzing Policemen by Kerry Feltham
- Zwei Frauen in der Oper by Christian Veit-Attendorff

== Parallel sections ==
=== International Critics' Week ===
The following feature films were screened for the 18th International Critics' Week (18e Semaine de la Critique):

- Entends le coq by Stefan Dimitrov (Bulgaria)
- Fremd bin ich eingezogen by Titus Leber (Austria)
- Jun by Hiroto Yokoyama (Japan)
- Northern Lights by John Hanson, Rob Nilsson (United States)
- La Rabi by Eugeni Anglada (Spain)
- Les Servantes du bon dieu by Diane Létourneau (Canada)
- The Tall Shadows of the Wind (Sayehaye bolande bad) by Bahman Farmanara (Iran)

=== Directors' Fortnight ===
The following films were screened for the 1979 Directors' Fortnight (Quinzaine des Réalizateurs):

- Angi Vera by Pal Gabor
- Bastien, Bastienne by Michel Andrieu
- Black Jack by Ken Loach
- Caniche by Bigas Luna
- Chrissomaloussa by Tony Lycouressis
- Cronica de um Industrial by Luis Rosemberg
- Julio Begins in July (Julio Comienza en Julio) by Silvio Caiozzi
- The Management Forgives a Moment of Madness (La empresa perdona un momento de locura) by Mauricio Walerstein
- La Mémoire Courte by Eduardo de Gregorio
- Nighthawks by Ron Peck
- Old Boyfriends by Joan Tewkesbury
- Five Evenings (Пять вечеров, Piats Vetcherov) by Nikita Mikhalkov
- Rockers by Theodoros Bafaloukos
- Those Wonderful Movie Cranks (Báječní muži s klikou) by Jiri Menzel
- Tiro by Jacob Bijl
- To Be Sixteen (Avoir 16 ans) by Jean Pierre Lefebvre
- Zmory (Nightmares) by Wojciech Marczewski

Short films

- Combattimento by Anna Kendall
- Idila by Aleksandar Ilić
- Panoplie by Philippe Gaucherand
- Romance by Yves Thomas
- Vereda Tropical by Joaquim Pedro de Andrade

== Official Awards ==
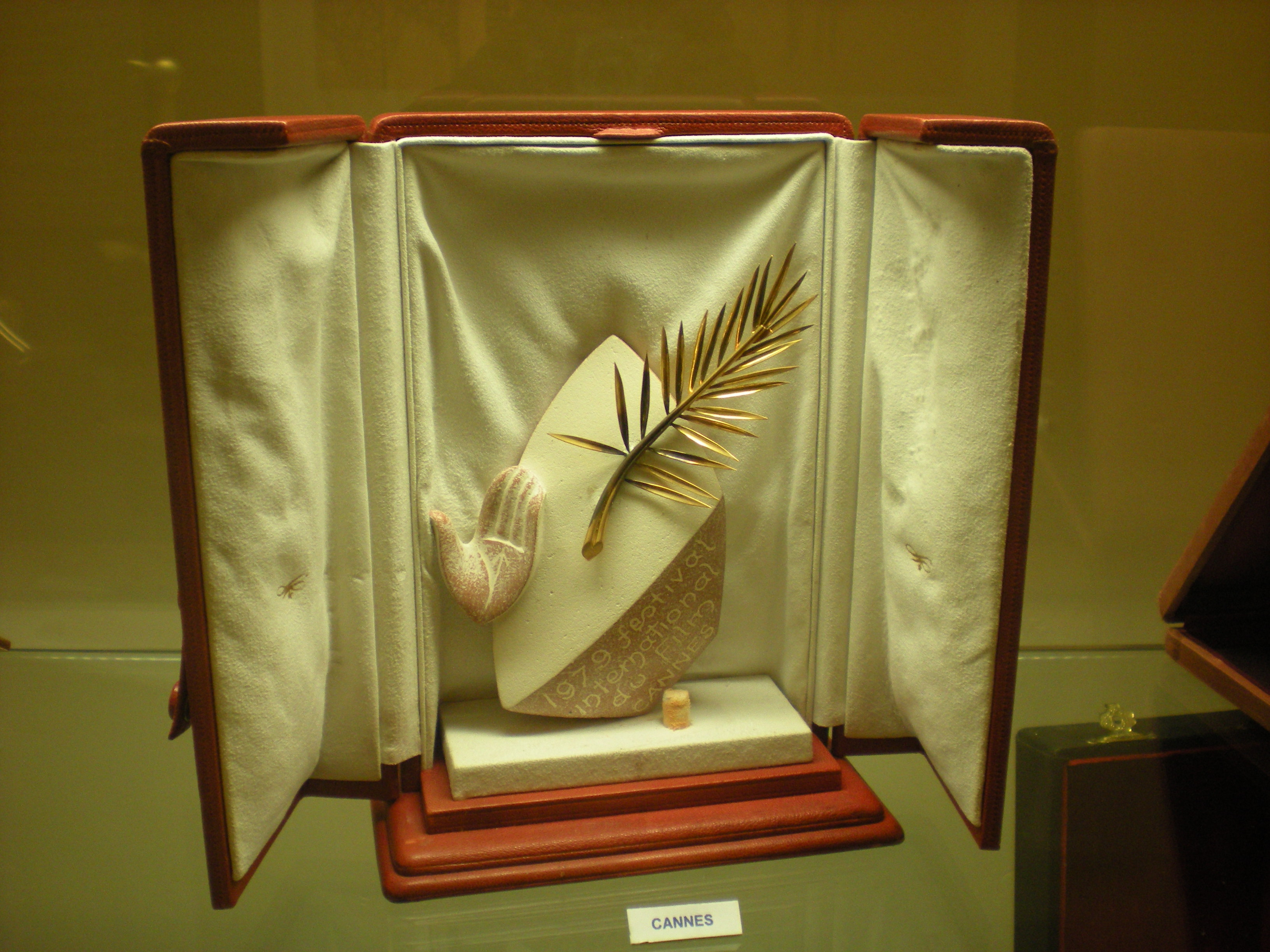
Palme d'Or awarded to Apocalypse Now at the 1979 Cannes Film Festival

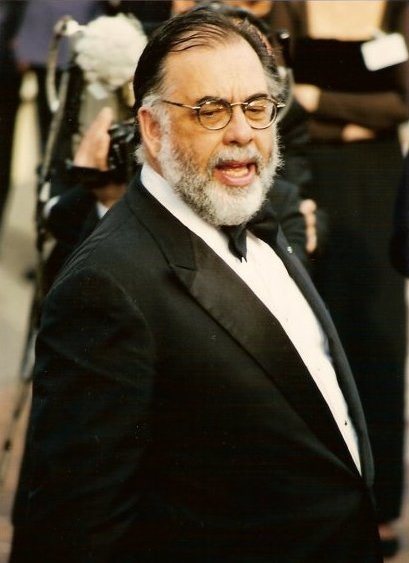
Francis Ford Coppola, winner of the Palme d'Or

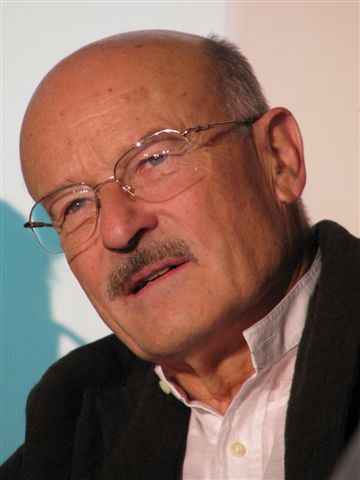
Volker Schlöndorff, winner of the Palme d'Or

=== Main Competition ===
The following films and people received the 1979 Official selection awards:

- Palme d'Or:
  - Apocalypse Now by Francis Ford Coppola
  - The Tin Drum by Volker Schlöndorff
- Grand Prix: Siberiade by Andrei Konchalovsky
- Best Director: Terrence Malick for Days of Heaven
- Best Actress: Sally Field for Norma Rae
- Best Actor: Jack Lemmon for The China Syndrome
- Best Supporting Actress: Eva Mattes for Woyzeck
- Best Supporting Actor: Stefano Madia for Dear Father
- Honorary Award: Hommage à Miklós Jancsó

=== Caméra d'Or ===
- Northern Lights by John Hanson and Rob Nilsson

=== Short Film Palme d'Or ===
- Harpya by Raoul Servais
- Jury Prize - animation: Bum by Břetislav Pojar
- Jury Prize - fiction: La Festa dels bojos by Lluis Racionero Grau

== Independent Awards ==
=== FIPRESCI Prizes ===
- Apocalypse Now by Francis Ford Coppola (In competition)
- Black Jack by Ken Loach (Directors' Fortnight)
- Angi Vera by Pál Gábor (Directors' Fortnight)

=== Commission Supérieure Technique ===
- Technical Grand Prize: Norma Rae by Martin Ritt

=== Prize of the Ecumenical Jury ===
- Without Anesthesia by Andrzej Wajda
  - Special Mention: Arven by Anja Breien

=== Young Cinema Award ===
- Prix du jeune cinéma: The Hussy by Jacques Doillon

== Media ==
- INA: Selection of the 1979 Festival (commentary in French)
- INA: Lauren Bacall and Yves Montand special guests at the opening gala 1979 (commentary in French)
