= The Hussy =

1979 film

- Directed by: Jacques Doillon
- Written by: Jacques Doillon; Denis Ferraris
- Produced by: Danièle Delorme; Yves Robert
- Starring: Claude Hébert
- Cinematography: Philippe Rousselot
- Edited by: Laurent Quaglio
- Distributed by: AMLF
- Release date: 23 May 1979
- Running time: 90 minutes
- Country: France
- Language: French

The Hussy (French: La drôlesse) is a 1979 French drama film directed by Jacques Doillon. It was entered into the 1979 Cannes Film Festival, where Doillon won the Young Cinema Award. In July 2021, the film was shown in the Cannes Classics section at the 2021 Cannes Film Festival.

== Plot ==
François a misfit kidnaps Mado, an odd 11-year old, and a story of Stockholm syndrome forms in the attic where Mado is locked.

== Cast ==
- Claude Hébert - François
- Madeleine Desdevises - Mado
- Paulette Lahaye - La mère de Mado
- Juliette Le Cauchoix - La mère de François
- Fernand Decaean - Le beau-père de François
- Dominique Besnehard - L'instituteur
- Odette Maestrini - L'epicière
- Ginette Mazure - La photographe
- Denise Garnier - La secrétaire de Mairie
- Norbert Delozier - Le beau-frère de François
- Janine Huet - La soeur de François
- Marie Sanson - La vieille dame aux Cailloux
- Edouard Besnehard - Le boulanger
- Henriette Adam - Une femme
- Jean Brunelière - Le juge d'instruction
- Jacques Thieulle - L'avocat
- Christian Bouillette - Un gendarme
