= Dear Father (1979 film) =

1979 film

- Film poster
- Directed by: Dino Risi
- Written by: Bernardino Zapponi; Marco Risi; Dino Risi; Simon Mizrahi
- Produced by: Pio Angeletti
- Starring: Vittorio Gassman
- Cinematography: Tonino Delli Colli
- Edited by: Alberto Gallitti
- Music by: Manuel De Sica
- Release date: 11 April 1979
- Running time: 110 minutes
- Country: Italy
- Language: Italian

Dear Father (Italian: Caro papà) is a 1979 Italian drama film directed by Dino Risi. It was entered into the 1979 Cannes Film Festival, where Stefano Madia won the award for Best Supporting Actor.

== Cast ==
- Vittorio Gassman - Albino Millozza
- Andrée Lachapelle - Giulia Millozza
- Aurore Clément - Margot
- Stefano Madia - Marco Millozza
- Julien Guiomar - Parrella
- Joanne Côté - Laura
- Antonio Maimone - Enrico
- Andrew Lord Miller - James
- Piero Del Papa - Duilio
- Mario Verdon - Ugo
- Don Arrès - Marco
- Gérard Arthur - Rodolfo
- Sergio Ciulli - Gianni
- Clara Colosimo - Myrta
- Nguyen Duong Don - Pierre
