= Raoul Servais =

Belgian filmmaker and artist (1928–2023)

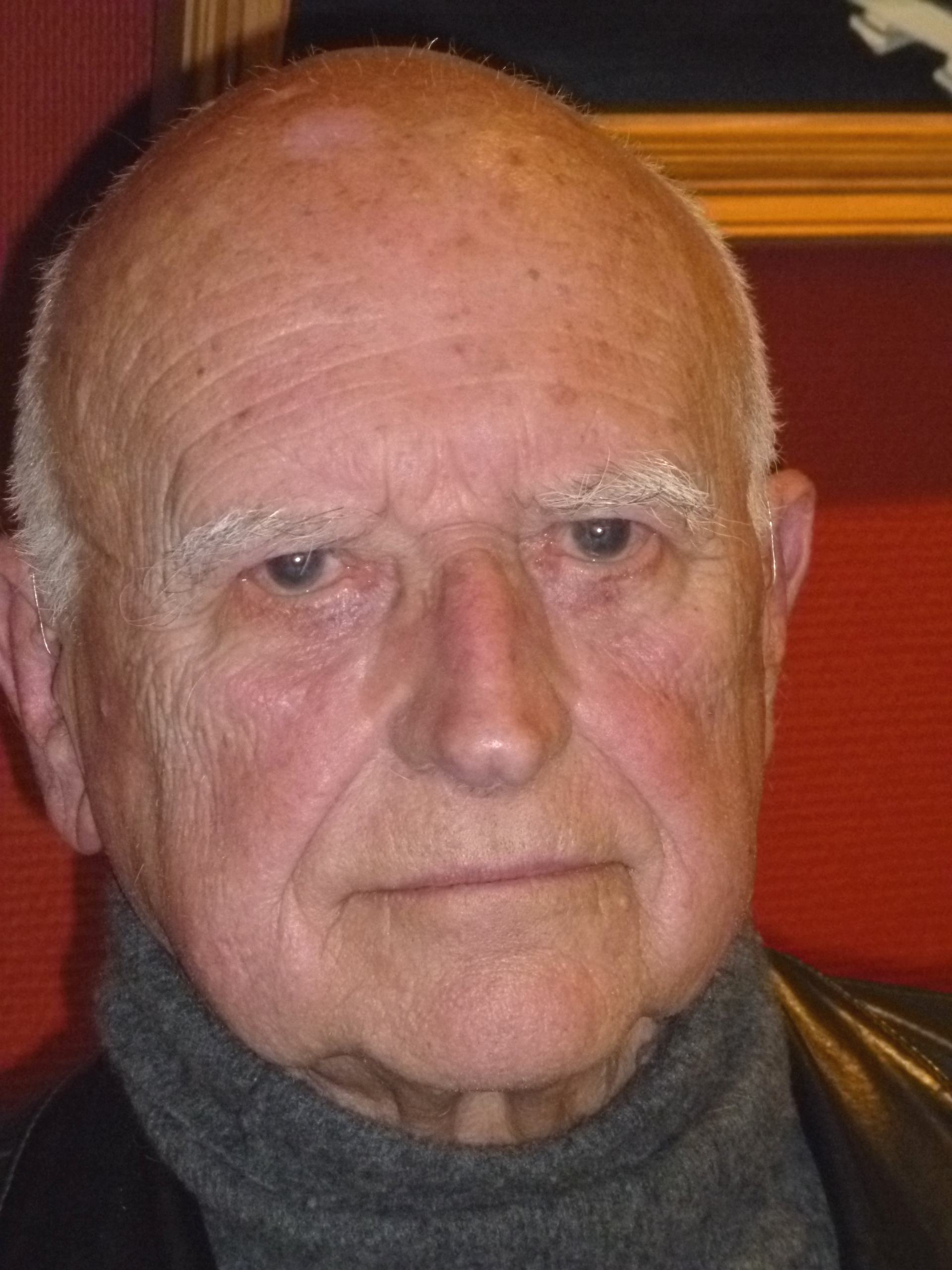
- Servais in 2014
- Born: Raoul Servais; 1 May 1928; Ostend, Belgium
- Died: 17 March 2023 (aged 94); Leffinge, Belgium
- Occupations: Filmmaker, animator, comics artist

Raoul Servais (French: [sɛʁvɛ]; 1 May 1928 – 17 March 2023) was a Belgian filmmaker, animator and comics artist.

== Biography ==
Servais was born in Ostend, Belgium, to parents of Walloon origin.

He was the founder of the animation faculty of the Royal Academy of Fine Arts (KASK).

Servais is best known for the 1979 animated film Harpya, for which he won a Palme d'Or at the 1979 Cannes Film Festival.

Servais received the Lifetime Achievement Award at the World Festival of Animated Film – Animafest Zagreb in 2016. At the 9th Magritte Awards, he received an Honorary Magritte Award from the Académie André Delvaux. In total, Servais won about 60 film prizes. Homages with retrospectives were organized in Paris, Madrid, Istanbul, Montreal, New York, Tokyo, Hong Kong, Rio de Janeiro and St Petersburg.

Servais died at his home in Leffinge on 17 March 2023, at the age of 94.

== Filmography ==
- 1960: Harbour Lights (Royal Academy of Fine Arts, Ghent)
- 1963: The False Note
- 1966: Chromophobia
- 1968: Siren
- 1969: Goldframe
- 1970: To Speak or Not to Speak
- 1971: Operation X-70
- 1973: Pegasus
- 1976: Halewyn's Song
- 1979: Harpya (Palme d'Or for Best Short Film at the 1979 Cannes Film Festival)
- 1994: Taxandria (Diploma of Merit at the 4th Kecskemét Animation Film Festival
- 1998: Nocturnal Butterflies
- 2001: Atraksion
- 2005: Winter Days (3' sequence)
- 2016: Tank

== See also ==
- Cinema of Belgium
