= Dispatches (book) =

1977 book by Michael Herr

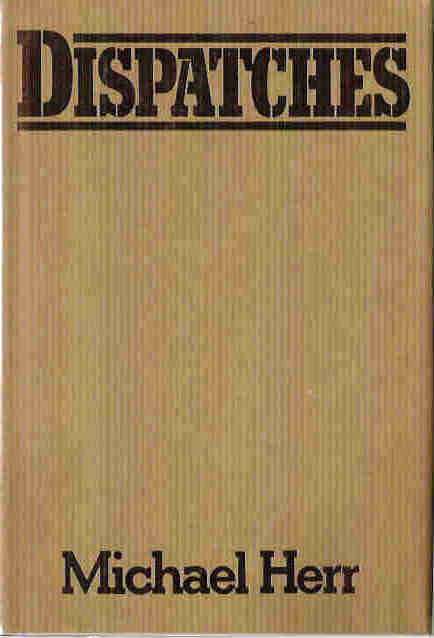
- First edition
- Author: Michael Herr
- Language: English
- Genre: Journalism
- Publisher: Knopf
- Publication date: 1977
- Publication place: United States
- Media type: Print (Paperback)
- Pages: 272 pp
- ISBN: 0-679-73525-9
- OCLC: 22956787
- Dewey Decimal: 959.704/38 20
- LC Class: DS559.5 .H47 1991

Dispatches is a book comprising six narratives by Michael Herr, each of which originally appeared in periodicals and were first collected in 1977 by Alfred A. Knopf.

An early example of the New Journalism, Herr's rendering of his experiences as a Vietnam War correspondent was a critical success.

Featured in the book are fellow war correspondents Sean Flynn, Dana Stone, and Dale Dye, and photojournalist Tim Page.

== Contents ==
Original periodical publication indicated:

- Breathing In (Esquire, 1976, titled “The Jubilee”)
- Hell Sucks (Esquire, 1968)
- Khe Sanh (Esquire, September 1, 1969)
- Illumination Rounds (New American Review #7, 1969)
- Colleagues (Esquire, April 1, 1970)
- Breathing Out (Rolling Stone, 1976, titled “LZ Loon”)

== Background ==
“If ever a correspondent managed to be in the right places at the right times—the wrong places and the wrong times from the point of view of survival—it was Michael Herr in Vietnam.”—Journalist Robert Stone (2009)

After freelancing for Holiday magazine in the mid-1960s, Herr approached Esquire’s Harold Hayes and landed a war correspondent assignment in Vietnam. He arrived there in November 1967, age 27, and was attached to combat units with the IV Corps. Two months after his arrival the Tet Offensive began, and Herr accompanied units to Cần Thơ, Huế Khe Sanh and other theaters in the war. During this period he published Hell Sucks with Esquire. In October 1968 he returned to New York.

During the next 18 months Herr wrote three more of the six narratives that would ultimately appear in Dispatches: Khe Sanh, Illumination Rounds, and Colleagues.

During this interlude of productivity, Herr suffered the loss of several of his co-correspondents which served to trigger an emotional and creative crisis.

In a June 28, 1990 interview with NPR’s Terry Gross Herr recalled the period between 1969 and 1971:

You know, I came back [from Vietnam] not only feeling a kind of survivor's exultation, but with really a very underdeveloped sense of what I'd really just been through…It led me into a kind of a protracted state of breakdown where I was required to rummage through these various pieces and determine for myself what I believed and what I didn't believe…

Herr added that his condition “was not particularly healthy or wholesome or conducive to making good art.”

Herr discontinued his efforts to complete Dispatches and did not return to the project until 1976, when he wrote the narratives that appeared as Breathing In and Breathing Out. These, along with his four previous narratives, were published as Dispatches in 1977.

== Reception ==
John le Carré called Dispatches "the best book I have ever read on men and war in our time." It was featured in the journalism section of The Guardian's 100 greatest non-fiction book list in 2011.

After publishing Dispatches, Herr disclosed that parts of the book were invented, and that it would be better for it not to be regarded as journalism. In a 1990 interview with Los Angeles Times, he admitted that the characters Day Tripper and Mayhew in the book are "totally fictional characters" and went on to say:

A lot of Dispatches is fictional. I've said this a lot of times. I have told people over the years that there are fictional aspects to Dispatches, and they look betrayed. They look heartbroken, as if it isn't true anymore. I never thought of Dispatches as journalism. In France they published it as a novel.... I always carried a notebook. I had this idea—I remember endlessly writing down dialogues. It was all I was really there to do. Very few lines were literally invented. A lot of lines are put into mouths of composite characters. Sometimes I tell a story as if I was present when I wasn't, (which wasn't difficult)—I was so immersed in that talk, so full of it and so steeped in it. A lot of the journalistic stuff I got wrong.

Similarly, in a separate interview with Eric James Schroeder, he said:

I don't think it's any secret that there is talk in the book that's invented. But it's invented out of that voice that I heard so often and that made such penetration into my head.... I don't really want to go into that no-man's-land about what really happened and what didn't happen and where you draw the line. Everything in Dispatches happened for me, even if it didn't necessarily happen to me.

== Retrospective assessment ==
Dispatches was hailed by critics as one of the finest books published on the Vietnam War, revealing “what it was like to fight there, how it differed from all our other wars.”

Paul Ciotti at the Los Angeles Times reports:

When Herr’s Dispatches was published in 1977, critics hailed it as “a classic,” “the best book to have been written about the Vietnam War” and “the best personal journal about war, any war, that any writer has ever accomplished.”

== Adaptation ==
Dispatches was adapted into a musical with music by Elizabeth Swados.

== In screenplays ==
Herr worked on the narration for the movie Apocalypse Now and co-wrote the screenplay for the movie Full Metal Jacket. Several scenes and pieces of dialogue used in the book were later also used in those movies.

== Sources ==
- Bryan, C. D. B.. 1977. “The Different War.” New York Times, November 20, 1977. https://www.nytimes.com/1977/11/20/archives/the-different-war-war.html Accessed 29 July 2025.
- Ciotti, Paul. 1990. “MICHAEL HERR: A Man of Few Words : What Is a Great American Writer Doing Holed Up in London, and Why Has He Been So Quiet All These Years?” Los Angeles Times, April 15, 1990. https://www.latimes.com/archives/la-xpm-1990-04-15-tm-2121-story.html Accessed 29 July 2025.
- Garcia, Feliks. 2016. Michael Herr: ‘Dispatches’ and ‘Apocalypse Now’ writer dies aged 76. The Independent , June 25, 2016. https://www.independent.co.uk/news/people/michael-herr-dead-dispatches-apocalypse-now-full-metal-jacket-vietnam-war-a7103086.html Accessed 26 July 2025.
- Gross, Terry. 2016. Remembering Michael Herr, Whose 'Dispatches' Brought The War In Vietnam Home. National Public Radio, June 28, 2016. Transcript provides Gross’s June 28, 1990 broadcast interview with Micheal Herr.https://www.npr.org/2016/06/28/483776202/remembering-michael-herr-whose-dispatches-brought-the-war-in-vietnam-home Accessed 28 July 2025.
- Herr, Michael. 2009. Dispatches. Everyman's Library, New York and Toronto. ISBN 978-0-307-27080-1
- McCrum, Robert. 2016. The 100 best nonfiction books: No 9 – Dispatches by Michael Herr (1977). The Guardian, March 28, 2016.https://www.theguardian.com/books/2016/mar/28/100-best-nonfiction-books-of-all-time-no-9-dispatches-michael-herr-vietnam-war-apocalypse-now
- Page, Tim. 2016. Words that will forever pursue us: Tim Page on Michael Herr, rock’n’roll voice of the Vietnam War. The Guardian, July 4, 2016.https://www.theguardian.com/books/2016/jul/05/words-that-will-forever-pursue-us-tim-page-on-michael-herr-the-rock-and-roll-voice-of-the-vietnam-war Accessed 25 July 2025.
- Schroeder, Eric James. 1989. "Interview with Michael Herr: ‘We've All Been There.’” Writing on the Edge, Fall, 1989, Vol. 1, No. 1 (Fall, 1989), pp. 39-54 Published by: Regents of the University of California, on behalf of its Davis University Writing Program Stable https://www.jstor.org/stable/43158633 Accessed 26 July 2025.
- Stone, Robert. 2009. Introduction to Dispatches. pp. ix-xiii. Everyman's Library, New York, Toronto. ISBN 978-0307-27080-1 Stone’s Introduction was published in Literary Hub, “How Michael Herr Transcended New Journalism” June 28, 2016. https://lithub.com/how-michael-herr-transcended-new-journalism/ Accessed 23 July 2025.
