= Michael Herr =

American journalist (1940–2016)

- Born: Michael David Herr; April 13, 1940; Lexington, Kentucky, U.S
- Died: June 23, 2016 (aged 76); Delhi, New York, U.S
- Occupation: Writer
- Notable work: Dispatches (1977); Apocalypse Now (1979); Full Metal Jacket (1987)
- Spouse: Valerie

Michael David Herr (April 13, 1940 – June 23, 2016) was an American writer and war correspondent, known as the author of Dispatches (1977), a memoir of his time as a correspondent for Esquire (1967–1969) during the Vietnam War. The book was called "the best book to have been written about the Vietnam War" by fellow author C.D.B. Bryan in his review for The New York Times Book Review. Novelist John le Carré called it "the best book I have ever read on men and war in our time."

== Life and career ==
Herr was born in Lexington, Kentucky, the son of a jeweler, and grew up in Syracuse, New York. His family was Jewish. After working with Esquire in the 1960s, from 1971 to 1975 he published nothing. Then, in 1977, he went on the road with rock and roller Ted Nugent and wrote about the experience in a 1978 cover story for Crawdaddy magazine. Also in 1977, he published Dispatches, upon which his reputation mostly rests.

Herr was credited in the film for writing the narration for Francis Ford Coppola's 1997 film The Rainmaker. He had previously contributed to the narration for Coppola's 1979 film Apocalypse Now. He co-wrote the screenplay for the film Full Metal Jacket (1987) with director Stanley Kubrick and author Gustav Hasford. That film was based on Hasford's novel The Short-Timers and the screenplay was nominated for an Academy Award. Herr collaborated with Richard Stanley in writing the original screenplay for the 1996 film The Island of Dr. Moreau based on the H.G. Wells novel of the same name. However, Stanley claims the subsequent rewrites cost Herr his writing credit, omitting most of the material created by the two writers.

Herr wrote a pair of articles for Vanity Fair about Stanley Kubrick, which were later incorporated into the short book Kubrick (2000), a personal biography of the director. He declined to edit the script of Kubrick's last film Eyes Wide Shut (1999).

In the last years of his life, he became a devotee of Buddhism. Herr lived with his wife Valerie in Delhi, New York, until his death on June 23, 2016, at the age of 76.

== Publications ==
- Dispatches (1977) ISBN 0-679-73525-9
- The Big Room: Forty-Eight Portraits from the Golden Age (1987) (with Guy Peellaert) ISBN 0-671-63028-8 (stories about Hollywood personalities including Judy Garland, Howard Hughes, Marilyn Monroe, Elvis Presley, Frank Sinatra and Walter Winchell)
- Walter Winchell: A Novel (1990) ISBN 0-679-73393-0 (biographical novel about the newsman Walter Winchell)
- Kubrick (Grove, 2000) ISBN 0-8021-3818-7 (based on essay for Vanity Fair)
