= Lucien Goethals =

Belgian composer (1931–2006)

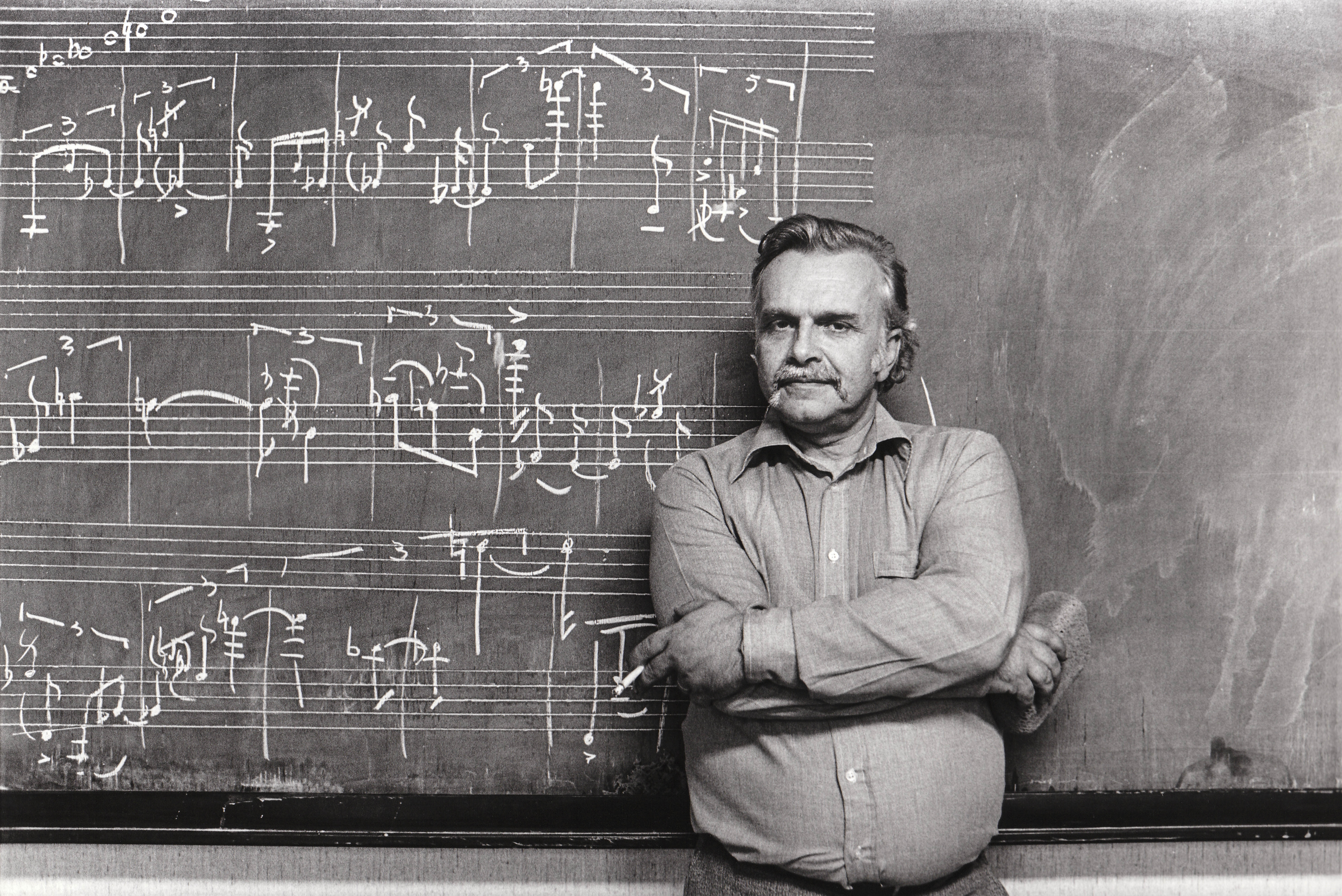
Lucien Goethals at IPEM Ghent ca. 1984

Lucien Goethals (26 June 1931 – 12 December 2006) was a Belgian composer.

== Life ==
Lucien Goethals was born in Ghent, but spent his formative years in Argentina, where he studied at the Dima Conservatory of Buenos Aires. When he returned to Belgium, he continued his studies at the Royal Conservatory in Ghent up to 1956, where he earned his first prize in organ, music history, counterpoint, and fugue. He later studied orchestration with Norbert Rosseau, and serial technique and electronic composition with Gottfried Michael Koenig and De Meester. He worked at the IPEM in Ghent ever since it was founded in 1962, and was its artistic director from 1970 to 1987. He died in Ghent, aged 75.

== Aesthetics ==
Goethals was a stubborn proponent of "high" culture, in opposition to postmodernism thinking, which wants to dissolve the separation between "high" and "low" culture into the function of a global post-industrial culture of consumption.

== Compositions ==
- Musica Dodecafonica, for piano (1959)
- Twee Kristallen, for piano (1961)
- Studies I–VIIb, for tape (1962–73)
- Diálogos, for wind quintet, percussion, 2 string quintets, string orchestra, and 4-track tape (1963)
- Endomorfie I, for violin, piano, and tape (1964)
- Endomorfie II, for 8 winds (1964)
- Cellotape, for cello with contact microphone, piano, and tape (1965)
- Lecina (6 songs, text: J. Van der Hoeven), for mezzo-soprano, flute, violin, and cello (1966)
- Sinfonía en gris mayor, 2 orchestras, percussion, 2 tapes (1966)
- Contrapuntos, for 1–12 tapes (1967)
- Mouvement (String Quartet No. 1) (1967)
- Vensters (text: J. Van der Hoeven), mobile for 2 speakers, cello, piano, percussion, 4 film projectors, and 4 tapes (1967)
- Cáscaras (text: C. Rodriguez), cantata for mezzo-soprano and 5 instruments (1969)
- Hé! [collaborative work with Karel Goeyvaerts and Herman Sabbe] (text: Herman Sabbe), for mime, 10 instruments, tapes, and slide projector (1971)
- Concerto for Orchestra (1972)
- Llanto por Salvador Allende, for trombone (1973)
- Melioribus, for tape (1973)
- Tres paisajes sonores, for flute, oboe, horn, trombone, violin, double bass, and harpsichord (1973)
- Diferencias, for 10 winds (1974)
- Polyfonium, for tape (1975)
- Four Pieces for Orchestra (1976)
- Pluriversum, for tape (1977)
- Música con cantus firmus triste, for flute and string trio (1978)
- Pampa (R. Güiraldes), mezzo-soprano, flute, clarinet, violin, viola, cello, piano, and percussion (1979)
- Polyfonium II, for tape (1980)
- Concerto for bass clarinet, contrabass clarinet, and orchestra (1983)
- Concierto de la luz y las tinieblas, for organ and orchestra (1990)
- Synthèse '92, for tape (1991)
- String Quartet No. 2 (1992)

== Bibliography ==
- Geysen, Frans. 1986. "Het orgeloeuvre van Lucien Goethals". Orgelkunst 9, no. 2 (June): 29–37.
- Geysen, Frans. 2000. "Lucien Goethals' muziek voor orgel-solo". Revue belge de musicologie/Belgisch tijdschrift voor muziekwetenschap 54 (Liber amicorum Lucien Goethals): 179–88.
- Goethals, Lucien, and Gust Gils. 2000. "The Relationship between Poetry and Music: A Conversation between Lucien Goethals, Composer, and Gust Gils, Poet". Revue Belge de Musicologie / Belgisch Tijdschrift voor Muziekwetenschap 54:73–86.
- Lesaffre, Micheline. 2008 “De nieuwsgierigheid van de creatieve mens. In memoriam Lucien Goethals”. In Cultureel Jaarboek 2006–2007, Provincie Oost-Vlaanderen, 46–54.
- Moelants, Dirk. 2000. "Lucien Goethals' Electroacoustic Works". Revue Belge de Musicologie / Belgisch Tijdschrift voor Muziekwetenschap 54:143–56.
- Sabbe, Herman. 1977. Het muzikale serialisme als techniek en als denkmethode: Een onderzoek naar de logische en historische samenhang van de onderscheiden toepassingen van het seriërend beginsel in de muziek van de periode 1950–1975. Ghent: Rijksuniversiteit te Gent.
- Dierickx, Jelle, and Rebecca Diependaele (eds.). 2016. Het Pluriversum van Lucien Goethals, Leuven: MATRIX New Music Centre.
