= 52nd Academy Awards =

- Official poster
- Date: April 14, 1980
- Site: Dorothy Chandler Pavilion; Los Angeles, California, U.S.
- Hosted by: Johnny Carson
- Produced by: Howard W. Koch
- Directed by: Marty Pasetta

Highlights
- Best Picture: Kramer vs. Kramer
- Most awards: Kramer vs. Kramer (5)
- Most nominations: All That Jazz and Kramer vs. Kramer (9)

TV in the United States
- Network: ABC
- Duration: 3 hours, 15 minutes
- Ratings: 49 million 33.7% (Nielsen ratings)

The 52nd Academy Awards ceremony, organized by the Academy of Motion Picture Arts and Sciences (AMPAS), honored films released in 1979 and took place on April 14, 1980, at the Dorothy Chandler Pavilion in Los Angeles, beginning at 6:00 p.m. PST / 9:00 p.m. EST. During the ceremony, AMPAS presented Academy Awards (commonly referred to as Oscars) in 22 categories. The ceremony, televised in the United States by ABC, was produced by Howard W. Koch and directed by Marty Pasetta. Comedian and talk show host Johnny Carson hosted the show for the second consecutive year. Three days earlier, in a ceremony held at The Beverly Hilton in Beverly Hills, California, on April 11, the Academy Scientific and Technical Awards were presented by hosts Cloris Leachman and William Shatner.

Kramer vs. Kramer won five awards, including Best Picture, Best Director for Robert Benton, Best Actor for Dustin Hoffman, and Best Supporting Actress for Meryl Streep. Sally Field received Best Actress honors for Norma Rae, and Melvyn Douglas won Best Supporting Actor for Being There. The telecast received a mixed reception, with critics praising Carson's hosting performance but criticising the pacing and predictability of the ceremony. It garnered 49 million viewers in the United States, which was a 6% increase from the previous year.

== Winners and nominees ==
The nominees for the 52nd Academy Awards were announced on February 25, 1980, by Academy president Fay Kanin and actors Ed Asner and Yvette Mimieux. All That Jazz and Kramer vs. Kramer tied for the most nominations, with nine each. The winners were announced at the awards ceremony on April 14. At age eight, Best Supporting Actor nominee Justin Henry became the youngest person nominated for an Oscar.

=== Awards ===
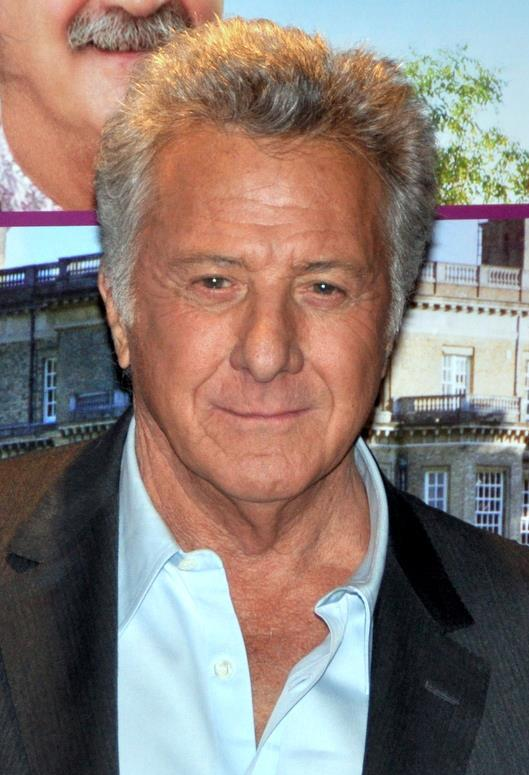
Dustin Hoffman, Best Actor winner

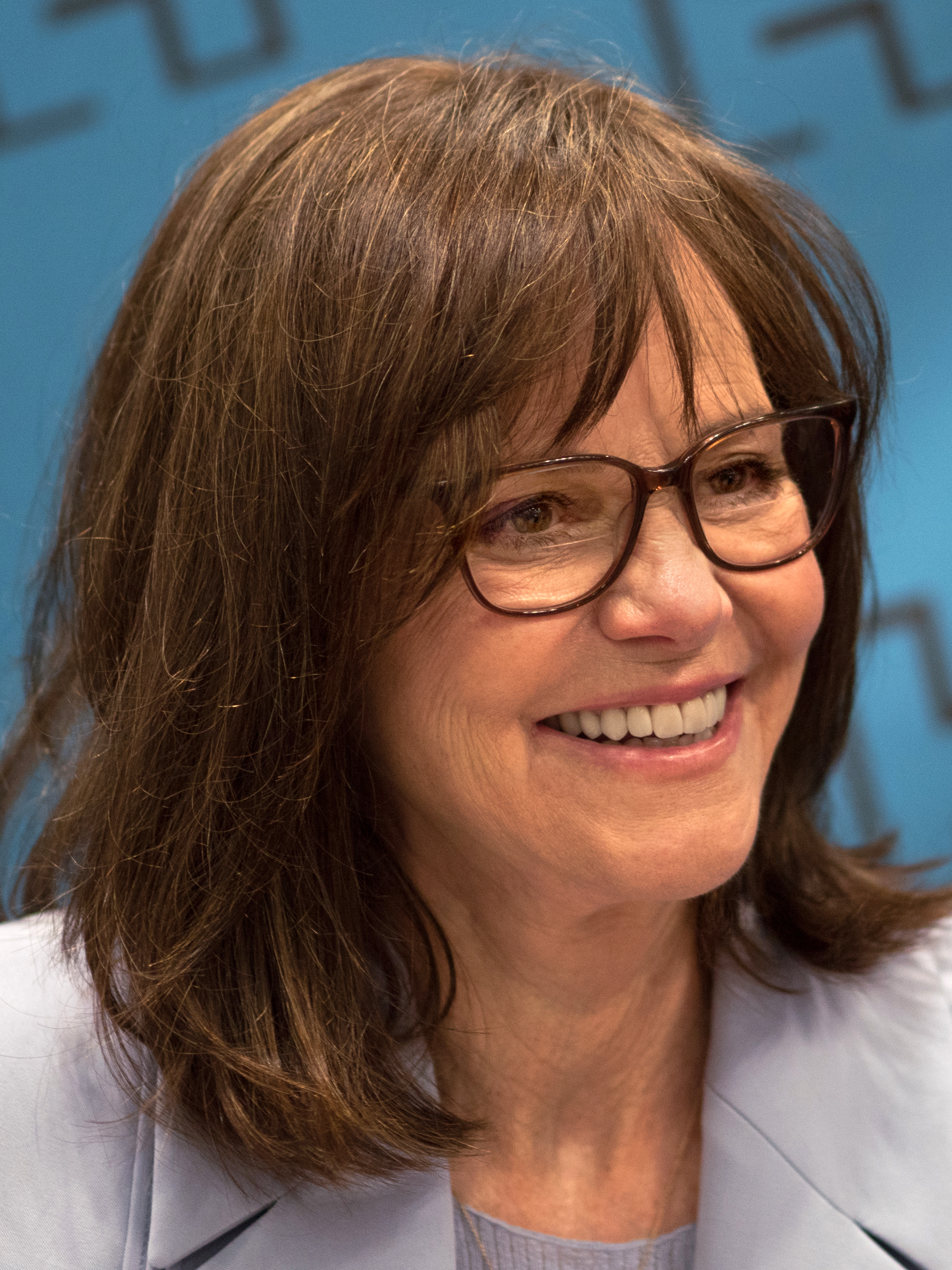
Sally Field, Best Actress winner

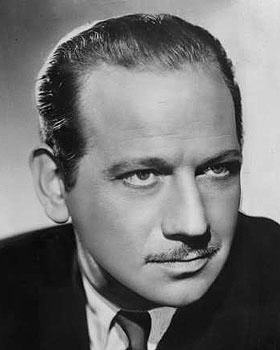
Melvyn Douglas, Best Supporting Actor winner

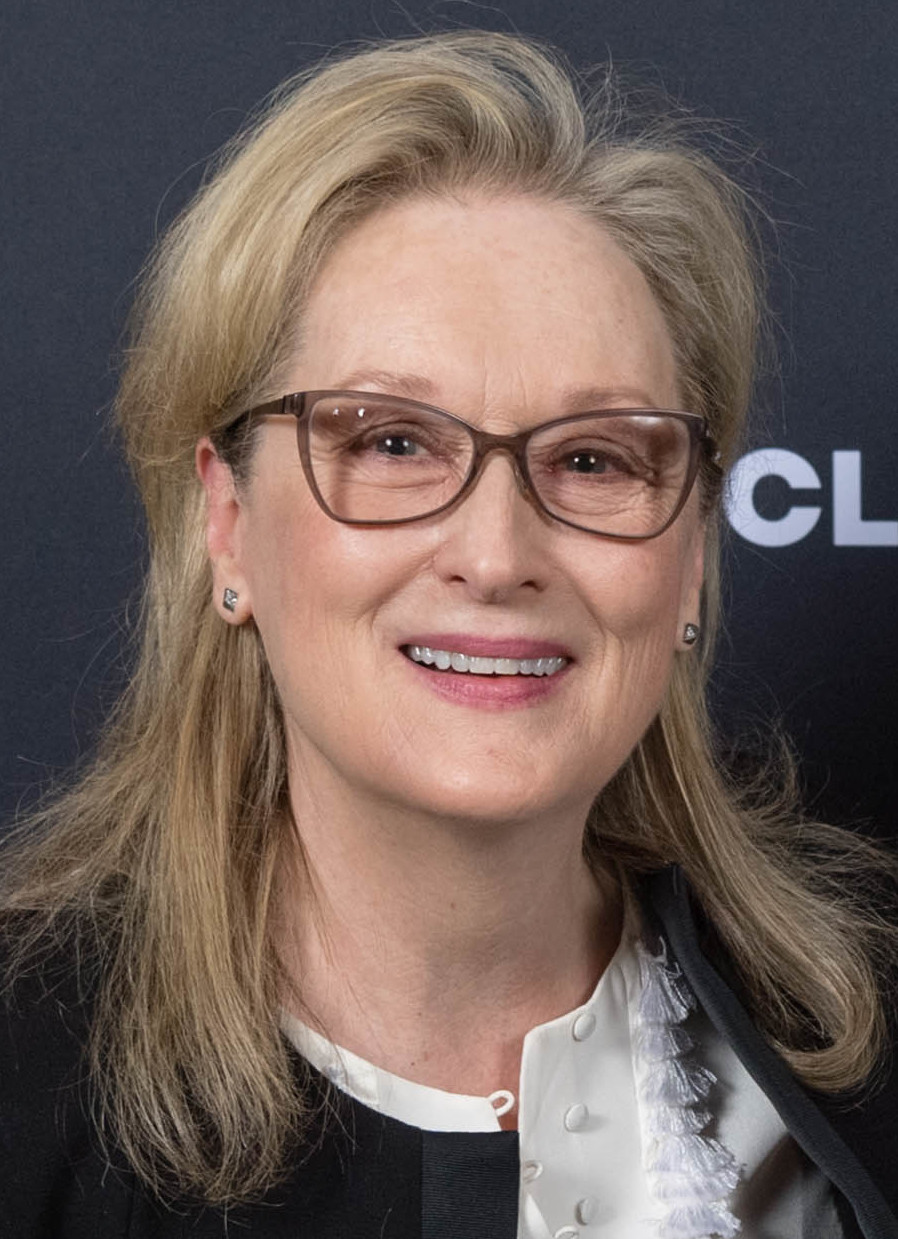
Meryl Streep, Best Supporting Actress winner

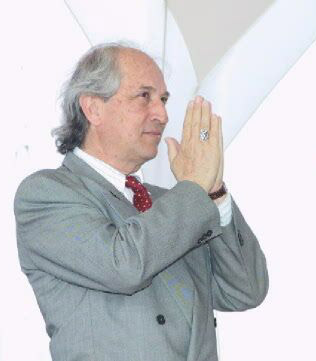
Vittorio Storaro, Best Cinematography winner

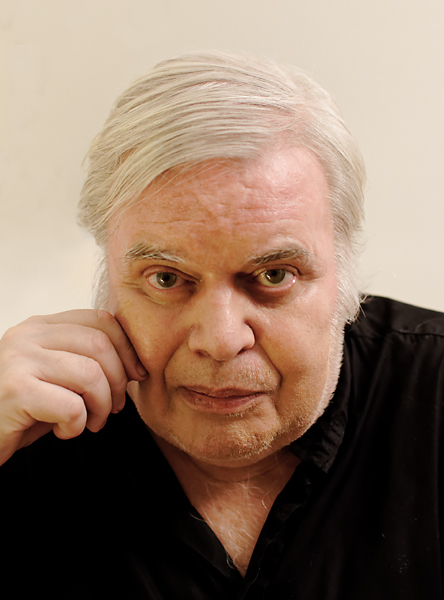
H. R. Giger, Best Visual Effects co-winner

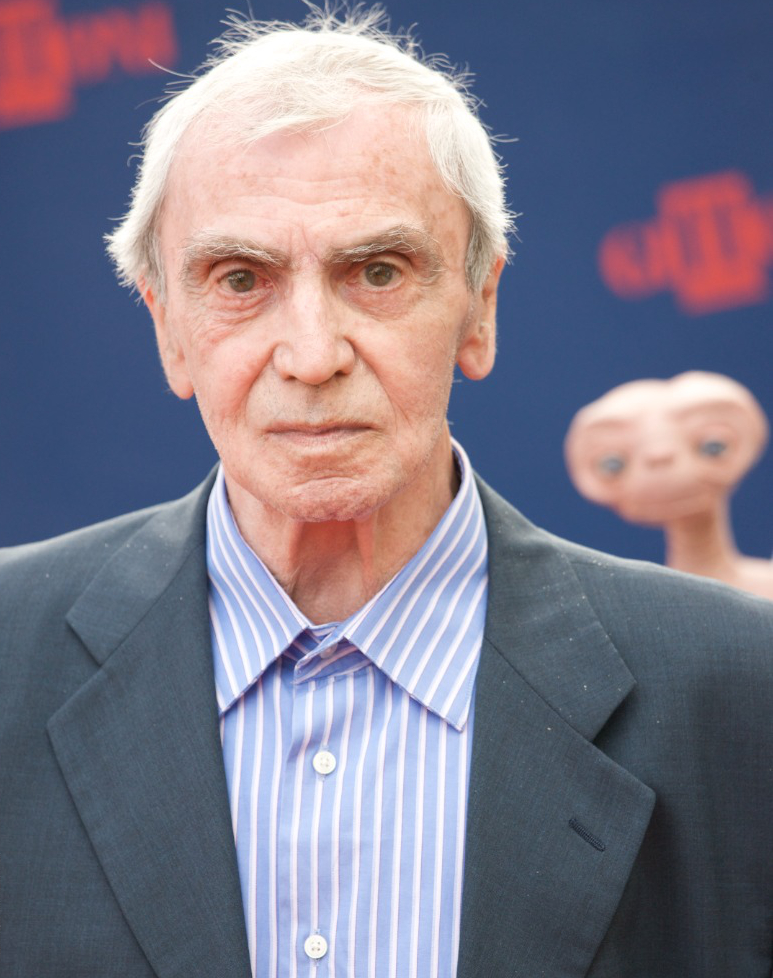
Carlo Rambaldi, Best Visual Effects co-winner

Winners are listed first, highlighted in boldface and indicated with a double dagger (‡).

Table featuring winners and nominees of the 53rd Academy Awards
**Best Picture**: **Kramer vs. Kramer – Stanley R. Jaffe, producer**‡; All That Jazz – Robert Alan Aurthur, producer; Apocalypse Now – Francis Coppola, producer; Fred Roos, Gray Frederickson and Tom Sternberg, co-producers; Breaking Away – Peter Yates, producer; Norma Rae – Tamara Asseyev and Alex Rose, producers	**Best Directing**: **Robert Benton – Kramer vs. Kramer**‡; Bob Fosse – All That Jazz; Francis Ford Coppola – Apocalypse Now; Peter Yates – Breaking Away; Édouard Molinaro – La Cage aux Folles
**Best Actor in a Leading Role**: **Dustin Hoffman – Kramer vs. Kramer as Ted Kramer**‡; Jack Lemmon – The China Syndrome as Jack Godell; Al Pacino – ...And Justice for All. as Arthur Kirkland; Roy Scheider – All That Jazz as Joseph "Joe" Gideon; Peter Sellers – Being There as Chance	**Best Actress in a Leading Role**: **Sally Field – Norma Rae as Norma Rae Webster**‡; Jill Clayburgh – Starting Over as Marilyn Holmberg; Jane Fonda – The China Syndrome as Kimberly Wells; Marsha Mason – Chapter Two as Jennie MacLaine; Bette Midler – The Rose as Mary Rose "The Rose" Foster
**Best Actor in a Supporting Role**: **Melvyn Douglas – Being There as Ben Rand**‡; Robert Duvall – Apocalypse Now as Lieutenant Colonel William "Bill" Kilgore; Frederic Forrest – The Rose as Huston Dyer; Justin Henry – Kramer vs. Kramer as Billy Kramer; Mickey Rooney – The Black Stallion as Henry Dailey	**Best Actress in a Supporting Role**: **Meryl Streep – Kramer vs. Kramer as Joanna Kramer**‡; Jane Alexander – Kramer vs. Kramer as Margaret Phelps; Barbara Barrie – Breaking Away as Evelyn Stohler; Candice Bergen – Starting Over as Jessica Potter; Mariel Hemingway – Manhattan as Tracy
**Best Writing (Screenplay Written Directly for the Screen)**: **Breaking Away – Steve Tesich**‡; All That Jazz – Robert Alan Aurthur and Bob Fosse; ...And Justice for All. – Valerie Curtin and Barry Levinson; The China Syndrome – Mike Gray, T. S. Cook, and James Bridges; Manhattan – Woody Allen and Marshall Brickman	**Best Writing (Screenplay Based on Material from Another Medium)**: **Kramer vs. Kramer – Robert Benton based on the novel by Avery Corman**‡; Apocalypse Now – Francis Coppola and John Milius based on the novel Heart of Darkness by Joseph Conrad; La Cage aux Folles – Francis Veber, Édouard Molinaro, Marcello Danon and Jean Poiret based on the play by Jean Poiret; A Little Romance – Allan Burns based on the novel E=mc^{2} mon amour by Patrick Cauvin; Norma Rae – Irving Ravetch and Harriet Frank Jr. based on the book Crystal Lee, a Woman of Inheritance by Hank Leiferman
**Best Foreign Language Film**: **The Tin Drum (Federal Republic of Germany)** in German – directed by Volker Schlöndorff ‡; The Maids of Wilko (Poland) in Polish – directed by Andrzej Wajda; Mama Turns 100 (Spain) in Spanish – directed by Carlos Saura; A Simple Story (France) in English and French – directed by Claude Sautet; To Forget Venice (Italy) in Italian – directed by Franco Brusati	**Best Documentary (Feature)**: **Best Boy – Ira Wohl**‡; Generation on the Wind – David A. Vassar; Going the Distance – Paul Cowan and Jacques Bobet; The Killing Ground – Steve Singer and Tom Priestley; The War at Home – Glenn Silber and Barry Alexander Brown
**Best Documentary (Short Subject)**: **Paul Robeson: Tribute to an Artist – Saul J. Turell**‡; Dae – Risto Teofilovski; Koryo Celadon – Donald A. Connolly and James R. Messenger; Nails – Phillip Borsos; Remember Me – Dick Young	**Best Short Film (Live Action)**: **Board and Care – Sarah Pillsbury and Ron Ellis**‡; Bravery in the Field – Roman Kroitor and Stefan Wodoslawsky; Oh Brother, My Brother – Carol Lowell and Ross Lowell; The Solar Film – Saul Bass and Michael Britton; Solly's Diner – Harry Mathias, Jay Zukerman and Larry Hankin
**Best Short Film (Animated)**: **Every Child – Derek Lamb**‡; Dream Doll – Bob Godfrey and Zlatko Grgić; It's So Nice to Have a Wolf Around the House – Paul Fierlinger	**Best Music (Original Score)**: **A Little Romance – Georges Delerue**‡; 10 – Henry Mancini; The Amityville Horror – Lalo Schifrin; The Champ – Dave Grusin; Star Trek: The Motion Picture – Jerry Goldsmith
**Best Music (Original Song Score and Its Adaptation -or- Adaptation Score)**: **All That Jazz – Ralph Burns**‡; Breaking Away – Patrick Williams; The Muppet Movie – Songs by Paul Williams and Kenny Ascher; Adaptation by Paul Williams	**Best Music (Original Song)**: **"It Goes Like It Goes" from Norma Rae – Music by David Shire; lyrics by Norman Gimbel**‡; "I'll Never Say Goodbye" from The Promise – Music by David Shire; lyrics by Alan and Marilyn Bergman; "It's Easy to Say" from 10 – Music by Henry Mancini; lyrics by Robert Wells; "Rainbow Connection" from The Muppet Movie – Music and lyrics by Paul Williams and Kenny Ascher; "Through the Eyes of Love" from Ice Castles – Music by Marvin Hamlisch; lyrics by Carole Bayer Sager
**Best Sound**: **Apocalypse Now – Walter Murch, Mark Berger, Richard Beggs and Nat Boxer**‡; 1941 – Robert Knudson, Robert Glass, Don MacDougall and Gene Cantamessa; The Electric Horseman – Arthur Piantadosi, Les Fresholtz, Michael Minkler and Al Overton Jr.; Meteor – William McCaughey, Aaron Rochin, Michael J. Kohut and Jack Solomon; The Rose – Theodore Soderberg, Douglas Williams, Paul Wells and Jim Webb	**Best Art Direction**: **All That Jazz – Art Direction: Philip Rosenberg and Tony Walton; Set Decoration: Edward Stewart and Gary J. Brink**‡; Alien – Art Direction: Michael Seymour, Leslie Dilley and Roger Christian; Set Decoration: Ian Whittaker; Apocalypse Now – Art Direction: Dean Tavoularis and Angelo P. Graham; Set Decoration: George R. Nelson; The China Syndrome – Art Direction: George Jenkins; Set Decoration: Arthur Jeph Parker; Star Trek: The Motion Picture – Art Direction: Harold Michelson, Joe Jennings, Leon Harris and John Vallone; Set Decoration: Linda DeScenna
**Best Cinematography**: **Apocalypse Now – Vittorio Storaro**‡; 1941 – William A. Fraker; All That Jazz – Giuseppe Rotunno; The Black Hole – Frank Phillips; Kramer vs. Kramer – Néstor Almendros	**Best Costume Design**: **All That Jazz – Albert Wolsky**‡; Agatha – Shirley Russell; Butch and Sundance: The Early Days – William Ware Theiss; The Europeans – Judy Moorcroft; La Cage aux Folles – Piero Tosi and Ambra Danon
**Best Film Editing**: **All That Jazz – Alan Heim**‡; Apocalypse Now – Richard Marks, Walter Murch, Gerald B. Greenberg and Lisa Fruchtman; The Black Stallion – Robert Dalva; Kramer vs. Kramer – Jerry Greenberg; The Rose – Robert L. Wolfe and C. Timothy O'Meara	**Best Visual Effects**: **Alien – H. R. Giger, Carlo Rambaldi, Brian Johnson, Nick Allder and Dennis Ayling**‡; 1941 – Gregory Jein, William A. Fraker and A. D. Flowers; The Black Hole – Peter Ellenshaw, Art Cruickshank, Eustace Lycett, Danny Lee, Harrison Ellenshaw and Joe Hale; Moonraker – Derek Meddings, Paul Wilson and John Evans; Star Trek: The Motion Picture – Douglas Trumbull, John Dykstra, Richard Yuricich, Robert Swarthe, Dave Stewart and Grant McCune

=== Special Achievement Award (Sound Editing) ===
- The Black Stallion – Alan Splet.

=== Honorary Awards ===
- To Alec Guinness for advancing the art of screen acting through a host of memorable and distinguished performances.
- To Hal Elias for his dedication and distinguished service to the Academy of Motion Picture Arts and Sciences.

=== Jean Hersholt Humanitarian Award ===
The award recognizes individuals whose humanitarian efforts have brought credit to the motion picture industry.

- Robert Benjamin

=== Irving G. Thalberg Memorial Award ===
The award honors "creative producers whose bodies of work reflect a consistently high quality of motion picture production".

- Ray Stark

=== Multiple nominations and awards ===
Films with multiple nominations
Nominations	Film
9	All That Jazz
9	Kramer vs. Kramer
8	Apocalypse Now
5	Breaking Away
4	The China Syndrome
4	Norma Rae
4	The Rose
3	1941
3	La Cage aux Folles
3	Star Trek: The Motion Picture
2	Alien
2	...And Justice for All.
2	Being There
2	The Black Hole
2	The Black Stallion (Note: Not counting the non-competitive Special Achievement Award for The Black Stallion.)
2	A Little Romance
2	Manhattan
2	The Muppet Movie
2	Starting Over
2	10

Films with multiple wins
Wins	Film
5	Kramer vs. Kramer
4	All That Jazz
2	Apocalypse Now
2	Norma Rae

== Presenters and performers ==
The following individuals, listed in order of appearance, presented awards or performed musical numbers:

=== Presenters ===
Table featuring presenters for the 52nd Academy Awards
Name(s)	Role
Hank Simms	Announcer of the 52nd Academy Awards
Fay Kanin (AMPAS president)	Gave opening remarks welcoming guests to the awards ceremony
Patrick Wayne	Explained the voting rules to the public
Cloris Leachman; Jack Lemmon	Presenters of the award for Best Supporting Actress
Ann Miller; Mickey Rooney	Presenters of the award for Best Art Direction
Dolly Parton; Ben Vereen	Presenters of the awards for Best Original Song Score and Its Adaptation or Adaptation Score and Best Original Score
Douglas Fairbanks Jr.	Presenter of the Jean Hersholt Humanitarian Award to Robert Benjamin
Robert Hays; Kristy McNichol	Presenters of the award for Best Costume Design
Farrah Fawcett; Harold Russell	Presenters of the award for Best Visual Effects
Persis Khambatta; William Shatner	Presenters of the awards Best Documentary Feature and Best Documentary Short
Lauren Hutton; Telly Savalas	Presenters of the awards for Best Animated Short Film and Best Live Action Short Film
Richard Gere	Presenter of the Academy Award for Technical Achievement to Mark Serrurier
Ann-Margret; Jack Valenti	Presenters of the award for Best Foreign Language Film
Sally Kellerman; Rod Steiger	Presenters of the award for Best Sound
Kirk Douglas	Presenter of the Irving G. Thalberg Memorial Award to Ray Stark
Jamie Lee Curtis; George Hamilton	Presenters of the award for Best Cinematography
Gene Kelly; Olivia Newton-John	Presenters of the award for Best Original Song
Bo Derek; Christopher Reeve	Presenters of the award for Best Film Editing
Walter Matthau; Liza Minnelli	Presenters of the award for Best Supporting Actor
Dustin Hoffman	Presenter of the Academy Honorary Award to Alec Guinness
Neil Simon	Presenter of the awards for Best Screenplay Written Directly for the Screen and Best Screenplay Based on Material from Another Medium
Walter Mirisch	Presenter of the Academy Honorary Award to Hal Elias
Jane Fonda	Presenter of the award for Best Actor
Richard Dreyfuss	Presenter of the award for Best Actress
Goldie Hawn; Steven Spielberg	Presenters of the award for Best Director
Charlton Heston	Presenter of the award for Best Picture

=== Performers ===
Table featuring performers for the 52nd Academy Awards
Name	Role	Performed
Henry Mancini	Musical arranger Conductor	Orchestral
Kermit the Frog	Performer	"Rainbow Connection" from The Muppet Movie
Dudley Moore; Helen Reddy	Performers	"Song from 10 (It's Easy to Say)" from 10
Melissa Manchester	Performer	"Through the Eyes of Love" from Ice Castles and "I'll Never Say Goodbye" from The Promise
Donald O'Connor	Performer	"Dancin' on the Silver Screen"
Dionne Warwick	Performer	"It Goes Like It Goes" from Norma Rae
Academy Awards Chorus	Performers	"That's Entertainment" during the closing credits

== Ceremony information ==
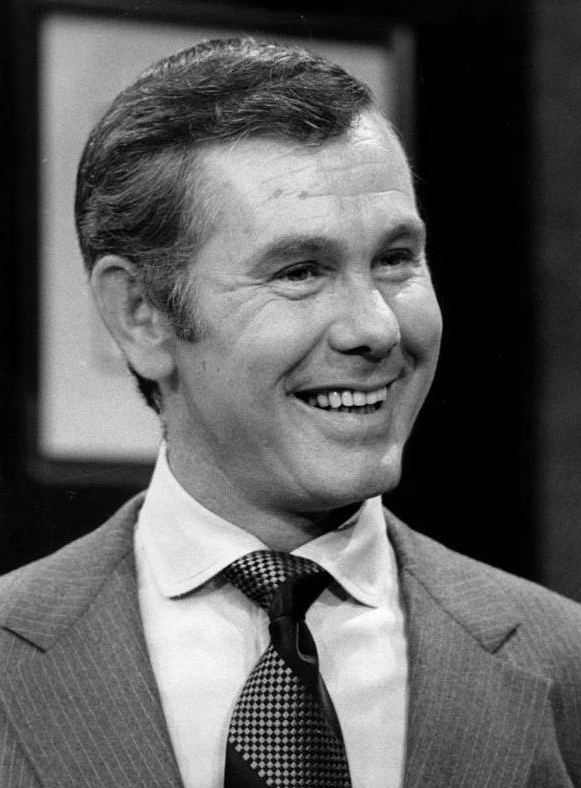
Johnny Carson hosted the 52nd Academy Awards.

In September 1979, the academy hired film producer Howard W. Koch to produce the telecast for the sixth time. Upon being named producer, Koch responded in a press release, stating, "I plan to involve all the professional and creative talents of the motion picture community in this program, as the Academy Awards, in the public's mind, represents the entire field of filmmaking." Two months later, it was announced that comedian and The Tonight Show host Johnny Carson would preside over emceeing duties for the 1980 ceremony. "Johnny Carson is one of our national treasures. He was selected as this year's host because his wit and verve made him an outstanding master of ceremonies at last year's show," said Koch in a statement justifying his selection for host.

Marty Pasetta directed the telecast. Henry Mancini served as musical director and conductor for the ceremony, where he conducted an overture performed by the orchestra at the beginning of the show. A song-and-dance number featuring actor and singer Donald O'Connor paid tribute to choreography in film.

=== Critical reviews ===
The ceremony received a mixed reception from critics. The Arizona Republic columnist Michael Maza wrote, "Watching last night's 52nd Annual Academy Award ceremonies was like sitting through three hours and 15 minutes of near-flawless close order drill. It wasn't long before the feet seemed to blur." Jack Mathews of the Detroit Free Press commented, "In any event, the 52nd Academy Awards presentation will stand as one of the smoothest, most predictable, and most reasonable Oscar nights in history. Also, alas, one of the most boring." The Baltimore Sun television critic Bill Carter quipped, "We found out Monday night when this year's edition of the Oscarcast streamlined to the point of emaciation (and still more than three hours long), thudded along like some awards dinner of the meat-packing industry." He praised Carson's hosting performance, but said, "For all the excitement this parade of stars provided, they might as well have sent in their stand-ins, or maybe some robot, or well dressed mannequins from a boutique on Rodeo Drive. This just wasn't a little boring, this was mind-numbingly boring."

Others received the broadcast more positively. Los Angeles Times film critic Charles Champlin mused, "As a show, the Marty Pasetta-Howard Koch special revealed again a gift for all that pizzazz." He added, "If nobody in fact was dozing, it was thanks to Carson's own relaxed and engaging presence. Among his virtues, he is an emcee who seems to love the movies." Film critic Gene Siskel from the Chicago Tribune commented, "The show was a visual delight, thanks to special electronic effects that presented scenes from each nominated film as its title was announced." Columnist Patrick Taggart of the Austin American-Statesman wrote, "Aren't we entitled to at least one upset victory among the nominees? The 52nd running of the Academy Awards was distinguished by the utter lack of any such color; but somehow, in spite of its slickness, Monday's show was a relatively good one."

=== Ratings and reception ===
The American telecast on ABC drew in an average of 49 million people over the length of the entire ceremony, which was a 6% increase from the previous year's ceremony. However, the show drew lower Nielsen ratings compared to the previous ceremony, with 33.7% of households watching with a 55% share. Furthermore, the ceremony presentation received five nominations at the 32nd Primetime Emmys, but failed to win any of its nominations.

== See also ==
- List of submissions to the 52nd Academy Awards for Best Foreign Language Film

== Bibliography ==
- Kinn, Gail; Piazza, Jim (2002), The Academy Awards: The Complete Unofficial History, New York, New York, United States: Workman Publishing Company, ISBN 978-1-5791-2396-3
- Osborne, Robert (2013). 85 Years of the Oscar: The Complete History of the Academy Awards. New York, New York, United States: Abbeville Publishing Group. ISBN 978-0-7892-1142-2. OCLC 856879222.
- Terrance, Vincent (2013). Television Specials: 5,336 Entertainment Programs, 1936–2012 (5 ed.). Jefferson, North Carolina, United States: Ballantine Books, McFarland & Company. ISBN 978-1-4766-1240-9. OCLC 844373010.
- Wiley, Mason; Bona, Damien (1996), Inside Oscar: The Unofficial History of the Academy Awards (5 ed.), New York, New York, United States: Ballantine Books, ISBN 978-0-3454-0053-6, OCLC 779680732
