= David K. Stewart =

- Born: August 27, 1937
- Died: October 16, 1997 (aged 60)
- Other names: David Stewart; Dave Stewart
- Occupation: Visual effects artist
- Years active: 1977-1997

David K. Stewart (August 27, 1937 – October 16, 1997) was a visual effects artist who was nominated at the 52nd Academy Awards for Best Visual Effects for Star Trek: The Motion Picture. He shared his nomination with John Dykstra, Grant McCune, Robert Swarthe, Douglas Trumbull and Richard Yuricich.

== Selected filmography ==
- Air Force One (1997)
- Judge Dredd (1995)
- Alien³ (1992)
- The Hunt for Red October (1990)
- 2010 (1984)
- The Outsiders (1983)
- Blade Runner (1982)
- Star Trek: The Motion Picture (1979)
- Close Encounters of the Third Kind (1977)
