= Robert Swarthe =

American film director (born 1942)

- Born: September 6, 1942 (age 83)
- Occupation: Special effects artist
- Years active: 1960-1983

Robert Swarthe (born September 6, 1942) is an American special effects artist who started out directing short films. He has two Academy Award nominations.

== Academy Award nominations ==
- 48th Academy Awards – Nominated in the category of Best Animated Short, Kick Me, lost to Great.
- 52nd Academy Awards – Nominated in the category of Best Visual Effects, Star Trek: The Motion Picture, nomination shared with John Dykstra, Grant McCune, David K. Stewart, Douglas Trumbull and Richard Yuricich. Lost to Alien.

== Preservation ==
The Academy Film Archive preserved Kick Me and The Unicycle Race by Swarthe.

== Filmography ==
=== As director ===
- Don’t Panic (1960)
- Attack of the Sea Beast (1962)
- Uncle Walt (1964)
- Minor Discrepancies (1964)
- Vamos Al Cine (1965)
- Inglewood Sniper (1966)
- The Oil Refinery (1966)
- The Unicycle Race (1966)
- One Eye (1967)
- K-9000: A Space Oddity (1968) with Robert Mitchell
- The Thrilling Adventures of the Chameleon in Color (1969)
- The Boss (1971)
- Radio Rocket Boy (1973) with John Mayer
- The Lone Dragnet (1973)
- Kick Me (1975)
- Ink, Paint, Scratch (1979)
- Double Suicide (1982)

=== As special effects artist ===
- Close Encounters of the Third Kind (1977)
- Star Trek: The Motion Picture (1979)
- One from the Heart (1982)
- The Outsiders (1983)

== See also ==
- Norman Mclaren
- Drawn on film
