= Uncle Walt (film) =

- The full short
- Directed by: Robert Swarthe
- Color process: None
- Production company: UCLA's Animation Workshop
- Release date: 1964
- Running time: 7:33
- Country: United States
- Language: English
- Budget: $150,000 to $200,000, 33 percent budget overrun

Uncle Walt is a 1964 satirical animated short by Robert Swarthe. The short features the characters Mickey Mouse and Minnie Mouse alongside racial caricatures and female centaurs working as prostitutes for Goofy, who is a pimp.

Made by Swarthe at UCLA, the film's only screening was at the 1972 American Film Institute program "50 Years of American Animation". It is preserved by the Academy Film Archive as part of its output. In 2024, Thunderbean Animation was planning to put the film onto a Blu-ray set titled "Public Domain Mouse Adventures"; this also included the first three Mickey Mouse cartoons that entered into the public domain. Swarthe prevented the release by threatening to sue, which resulted in the film being withdrawn. Two 16mm prints of the film surfaced on eBay with YouTube user Unckie NPC obtaining and uploading one of them online.

== See also ==
- Counterculture of the 1960s
- Lost media
- Mickey Mouse in Vietnam
