= Star Trek: The Motion Picture =

1979 American science fiction film

- Theatrical release poster by Bob Peak
- Directed by: Robert Wise
- Screenplay by: Harold Livingston
- Story by: Alan Dean Foster
- Based on: Star Trek by Gene Roddenberry
- Produced by: Gene Roddenberry
- Starring: William Shatner; Leonard Nimoy; DeForest Kelley; James Doohan; George Takei; Majel Barrett; Walter Koenig; Nichelle Nichols; Persis Khambatta; Stephen Collins
- Cinematography: Richard H. Kline
- Edited by: Todd C. Ramsay
- Music by: Jerry Goldsmith
- Production company: Paramount Pictures
- Distributed by: Paramount Pictures
- Release date: December 7, 1979
- Running time: 132 minutes
- Country: United States
- Language: English
- Budget: $44 million
- Box office: $139 million

Star Trek: The Motion Picture is a 1979 American science fiction film directed by Robert Wise. It is based on and stars the cast of the 1966–1969 television series Star Trek created by Gene Roddenberry, who served as producer. In the film, set in the 2270s, a mysterious and powerful alien cloud known as V'Ger approaches Earth, destroying everything in its path. Admiral James T. Kirk (William Shatner) assumes command of the recently refitted Starship Enterprise to lead it on a mission to determine V'Ger's origins and save the planet.

When Star Trek was cancelled in 1969, Roddenberry lobbied Paramount Pictures to continue the franchise through a feature film. The success of the series in syndication convinced the studio to begin work on the film in 1975. A series of writers and scripts did not satisfy Paramount, and they scrapped the film project. Instead, Paramount planned on returning the franchise to its roots, with a new television series titled Star Trek: Phase II. The box office success of Star Wars and Close Encounters of the Third Kind convinced Paramount to change course, cancelling production of Phase II and resuming work on a film.

In March 1978, Paramount announced Wise would direct a $15 million film adaptation of the original television series. Filming began that August and concluded the following January. With the cancellation of Phase II, writers rushed to adapt its planned pilot episode, "In Thy Image", into a film script. Constant revisions to the story and the shooting script continued to the extent of hourly script updates on shooting dates. The Enterprise was modified inside and out, costume designer Robert Fletcher provided new uniforms, and production designer Harold Michelson fabricated new sets. Jerry Goldsmith composed the film's score, beginning an association with Star Trek that would continue until 2002. When the original contractors for the optical effects proved unable to complete their tasks in time, effects supervisor Douglas Trumbull was asked to meet the film's December 1979 release date. Wise took the just-completed film to its Washington, D.C., opening, but always felt that the final theatrical version was a rough cut of the film he wanted to make.

Released in North America on December 7, 1979, Star Trek: The Motion Picture received mixed reviews, many of which faulted it for a lack of action, slow pacing and over-reliance on special effects. Its final production cost ballooned to approximately $44 million, and it earned $139 million worldwide, short of studio expectations but enough for Paramount to propose a less expensive sequel. Roddenberry was forced out of creative control for the sequel, Star Trek II: The Wrath of Khan (1982). In 2001, Wise oversaw a director's cut for a special DVD release of the film, with remastered audio, tightened and added scenes, and new computer-generated effects. The directors cut received a more favorable reception from critics.

== Plot ==
In the 23rd century, a Starfleet monitoring station, Epsilon Nine, detects an alien entity hidden in a massive energy cloud, moving through space toward Earth. The cloud easily destroys three Klingon warships and Epsilon Nine on its course. At Earth, the starship Enterprise is undergoing a major refit; its former commanding officer, James T. Kirk, has been promoted to admiral. Starfleet Command assigns Enterprise to intercept the cloud entity, as the ship is the only one within range, requiring its new systems to be tested in transit.

Citing his experience, Kirk uses his authority to take command of the ship, angering Captain Willard Decker, who has been overseeing the refit as its new commanding officer. Testing of Enterprise's new systems goes poorly; two officers, including the ship's Vulcan science officer Sonak, are killed by a malfunctioning transporter, and improperly calibrated engines nearly destroy the ship. Kirk's unfamiliarity with the ship's new systems increases the tension between him and Decker, who has been temporarily demoted to commander and first officer. Commander Spock arrives as a replacement science officer, explaining that while on his home world, undergoing a ritual to purge himself of emotion, he felt a consciousness that he believes emanates from the cloud, making him unable to complete the ritual because his human half felt an emotional connection to it.

Enterprise intercepts the energy cloud and is attacked by an alien vessel. A probe appears on the bridge, attacks Spock, and causes the navigator, Ilia, to vanish. She is replaced by a robotic replica, sent by the entity, which calls itself "V'Ger", to study the "carbon units" on the ship. Decker is distraught when it is revealed that the original Ilia, with whom he had a romantic history, has been killed. He attempts to extract information from the doppelgänger, which has Ilia's memories and feelings buried inside. Spock takes an unauthorized spacewalk to the vessel's interior and attempts a telepathic mind meld with it. In doing so, he learns that the entire vessel is V'Ger, a non-biological living machine.

At the center of the massive ship, V'Ger is revealed to be Voyager 6, a 20th-century NASA space probe from the Voyager program. It was believed lost in a black hole. The damaged probe was found by an alien race of living machines that interpreted its programming as instructions to learn all that can be learned and return that information to its creator. The machines upgraded the probe to fulfill its mission, and on its journey, the probe gathered so much knowledge that it achieved sentience. Spock discovers that V'Ger cannot give itself a purpose other than its original mission; having learned everything it could on its journey home, it finds its existence meaningless. Before transmitting all its information, V'Ger insists that the "Creator" come in person to finish the sequence. The Enterprise crew realizes humans are the Creator. Decker offers himself to V'Ger; he merges with the Ilia probe and V'Ger, creating a new life form that disappears into space. With Earth saved, Kirk directs Enterprise to space for future missions.

== Cast ==
The main cast of The Motion Picture in the film's costumes on the bridge set. Clockwise from far left: director Robert Wise: Collins, Barrett, Nimoy, Doohan, Shatner, Kelley, Whitney, Nichols, Koenig, producer Gene Roddenberry, Takei, and Khambatta. These and other publicity shots were taken after screen tests for the actors on August 3, 1978.

- William Shatner as James T. Kirk, the former captain of the USS Enterprise and an admiral at Starfleet headquarters. When asked during a March 1978 press conference about what it would be like to reprise the role, Shatner said, "An actor brings to a role not only the concept of a character but his own basic personality, things that he is, and both [Leonard Nimoy] and myself have changed over the years, to a degree at any rate, and we will bring that degree of change inadvertently to the role we recreate."
- Leonard Nimoy as Spock, the Enterprise's half-Vulcan, half-human science officer. Nimoy had been dissatisfied with unpaid royalties from Star Trek and did not intend to reprise the role, so Spock was left out of the screenplay. Director Robert Wise, having been informed by his daughter and son-in-law that the film "would not be Star Trek" without Nimoy, sent Jeffrey Katzenberg to New York City to meet Nimoy. Describing Star Trek without Nimoy as buying a car without wheels, Katzenberg gave Nimoy a check to make up for his lost royalties, later recalling himself "on my knees begging" the actor during their meeting at a restaurant to join the film; Nimoy attended the March 1978 press conference with the rest of the returning cast. Nimoy was dissatisfied with the script, and his meeting with Katzenberg led to an agreement that the final script would need Nimoy's approval. Financial issues notwithstanding, Nimoy said he was comfortable with being identified as Spock because it had a positive impact on his fame.
- DeForest Kelley as Leonard McCoy, the chief medical officer aboard the Enterprise. Kelley had reservations about the script, feeling that the characters and relationships from the series were not in place. Along with Shatner and Nimoy, Kelley lobbied for greater characterization, but their opinions were largely ignored.
- James Doohan as Montgomery Scott, the Enterprise's chief engineer. Doohan created the distinctive Klingon vocabulary heard in the film. Linguist Marc Okrand later developed a fully realized Klingon language based on the actor's made-up words.
- Walter Koenig as Pavel Chekov, the Enterprise's weapons officer. Koenig noted that the expected sense of camaraderie and euphoria at being assembled for screen tests at the start of the picture was nonexistent. "This may be Star Trek," he wrote, "but it isn't the old Star Trek." The actor was hopeful for the film, but admitted he was disappointed by his character's bit part.
- Nichelle Nichols as Uhura, the communications officer aboard the Enterprise. Nichols noted in her autobiography that she was one of the actors most opposed to the new uniforms added for the film because the drab, unisex look "wasn't Uhura".
- George Takei as Hikaru Sulu, the Enterprise's helmsman. In his autobiography, Takei described the film's shooting schedule as "astonishingly luxurious", but noted that frequent script rewrites during production "usually favored Bill" [Shatner].
- Persis Khambatta as Ilia, the Deltan navigator of the Enterprise. Khambatta was originally cast in the role when The Motion Picture was a television pilot. She took the role despite Roddenberry warning her that she would have to shave her head completely for filming.
- Stephen Collins as Willard Decker, the new captain of the Enterprise. He is temporarily demoted to commander and first officer when Kirk takes command of the Enterprise. He was the only actor that Robert Wise cast; Collins recalled that although "every young actor in Hollywood" auditioned, he benefited by being completely unfamiliar with the franchise, and was more interested in meeting the legendary director than in the role. Others advised him after being cast that Star Trek "is going to be in your life your whole life". Kelley's dressing room was next to Collins', and the older actor became his mentor for the production. Collins described filming as akin to "playing with somebody else's bat, ball, and glove" because he was not a part of the franchise's history. He used the feeling of being an "invader" to portray Decker, who is "an outsider who they had to have along".

Other actors from the television series who returned included Majel Barrett as Christine Chapel, a doctor aboard the Enterprise, and Grace Lee Whitney as Janice Rand, formerly one of Kirk's yeomen. David Gautreaux, who had been cast as Xon in the aborted second television series, appears as Branch, the commander of the Epsilon 9 communications station. Mark Lenard portrays the Klingon commander in the film's opening sequence; the actor also played Spock's father, Sarek, in the television series and in later feature films.

== Production ==
=== Early development ===
The original Star Trek television series ran for three seasons from 1966 to 1969 on NBC. The show was cancelled due to low Nielsen ratings after the third season. After the show's cancellation, owner Paramount Pictures sold the syndication rights. The series went into reruns in late 1969, and by the late 1970s had been sold in over 150 domestic and 60 international markets. The show developed a cult following, and talks of reviving the franchise began.

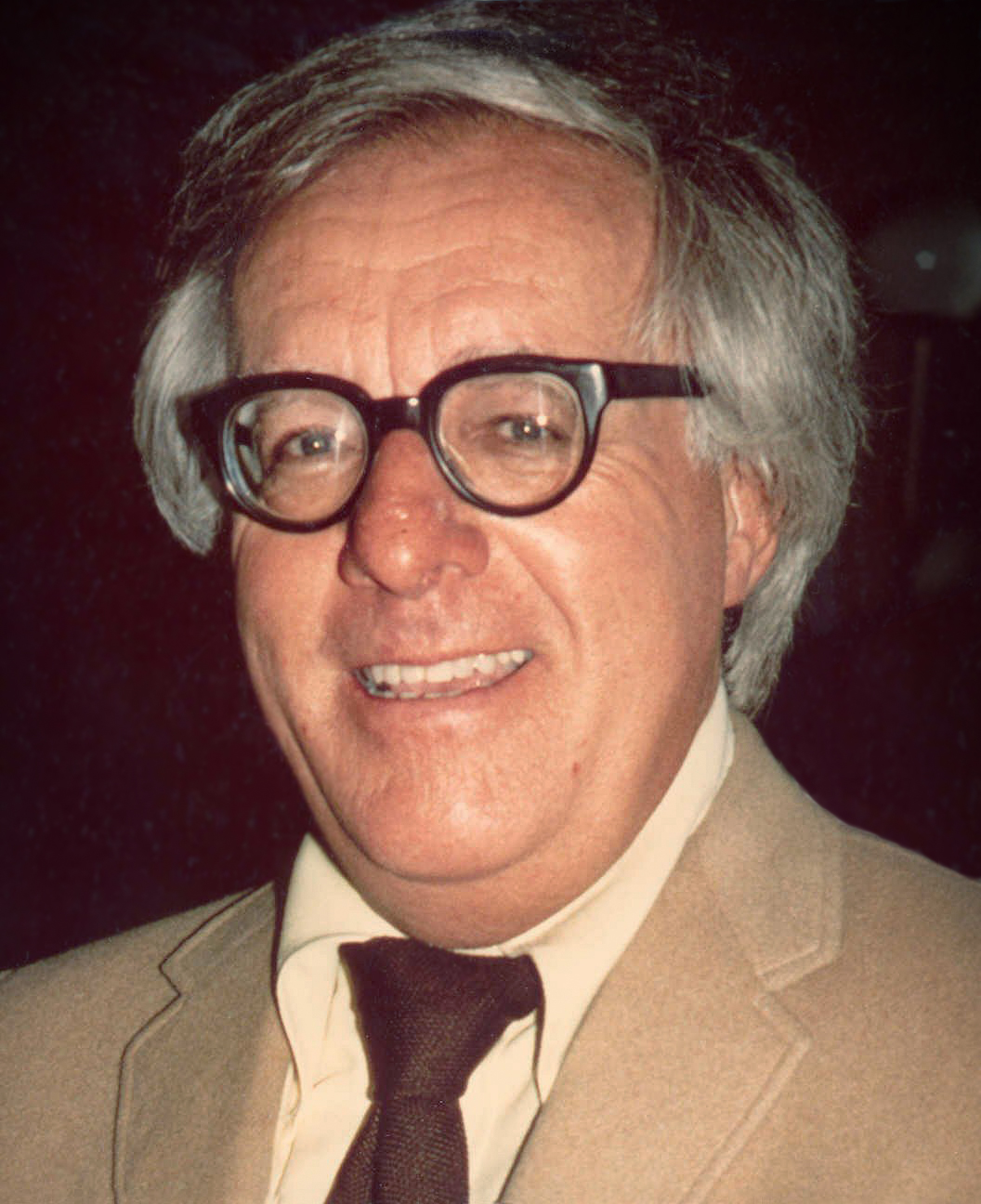
Ray Bradbury was one of the several science fiction writers who pitched a concept for the Star Trek feature film.

The series’ creator Gene Roddenberry first proposed a Star Trek feature at the 1968 World Science Fiction Convention. The movie was to have been set before the television series, showing how the Enterprise crew had met. The popularity of syndicated Star Trek prompted Paramount and Roddenberry to begin developing the film in May 1975. By June 30, he had produced what he considered an acceptable script, but studio executives disagreed. This first draft, The God Thing, featured a grounded Admiral Kirk assembling the old crew on the refitted Enterprise to clash with a godlike entity, miles across, which hurtles towards Earth. It turns out to be a super-advanced computer created by a scheming race who were cast out of their dimension. Kirk wins out, the entity returns to its dimension, and the Enterprise crew resumes their voyages. The basic premise and scenes such as a transporter accident and Spock's Vulcan ritual were discarded, but would return in the final story. Paramount fielded new scripts for Star Trek II (a working title) from acclaimed writers such as Ray Bradbury, Theodore Sturgeon, and Harlan Ellison. Ellison's story had an alien race tampering with Earth's timeline to create a kindred reptilian race; Kirk and the crew face an ethical dilemma of whether or not to destroy the reptilian race in Earth's prehistory just to maintain humanity's dominance. When Ellison presented his idea, an executive suggested that Ellison read Chariots of the Gods? and incorporate the Maya civilization into his story. This enraged the writer, on the basis that the Maya did not exist in prehistory. By October 1976, Robert Silverberg and John D. F. Black were assigned to the screenplay; their treatment featured a black hole that threatened to consume all of existence. Roddenberry joined with Jon Povill to write a new story that featured the Enterprise crew setting an altered universe right by time travel; like Black's idea, Paramount did not consider it sufficiently epic.

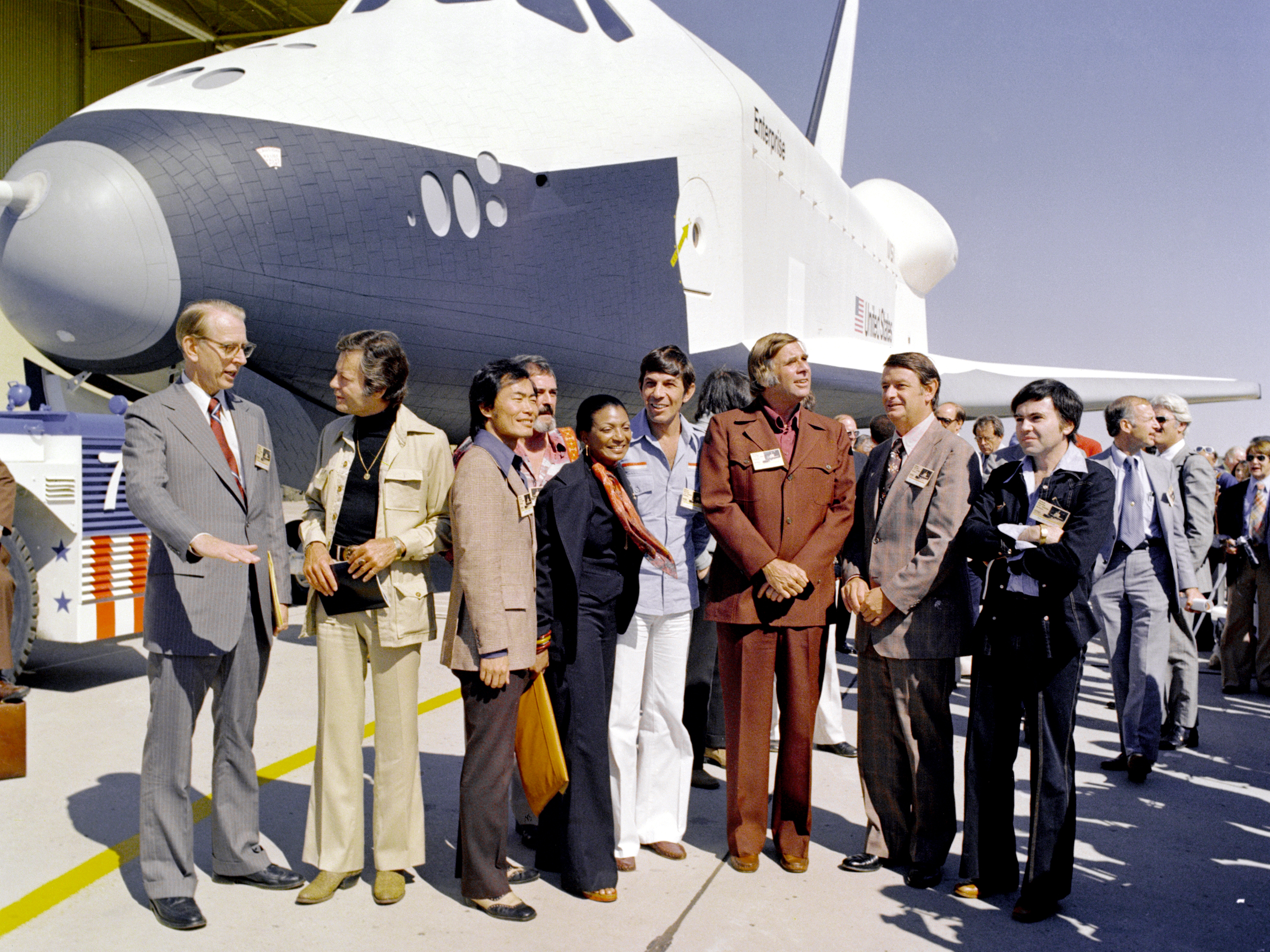
Roddenberry and the Star Trek cast on hand for the space shuttle Enterprise's rollout on September 17, 1976.

The film was the first major Hollywood adaptation of a television series that had been off the air for nearly a decade to retain its original principal cast. The actors grew anxious about the constant delays and pragmatically accepted other acting offers while Roddenberry worked with Paramount. The studio decided to turn the project over to the television division, reasoning that since the roots of the franchise lay in television, the writers would be able to develop the right script, but the new ideas they developed were also rejected. As Paramount executives' interest in the film waned, Roddenberry, backed by fan letters, applied pressure to the studio. In June 1976, Paramount assigned Jerry Isenberg, a young and active producer, to be executive producer of the project, with the budget expanded to $8 million. Povill was tasked with finding more writers to develop a script. His list included Edward Anhalt, James Goldman, Francis Ford Coppola, George Lucas, Ernest Lehman, and Robert Bloch. Povill put as his last recommendation "Jon Povill—almost credit: Star Trek II story (with Roddenberry). Will be a big shot some day. Should be hired now while he is cheap and humble." None of the listed 34 names was chosen. Finally, British screenwriters Chris Bryant and Allan Scott, who had penned the Donald Sutherland thriller Don't Look Now, were hired to write a script. Bryant believed he earned the screenwriting assignment because his view of Kirk resembled what Roddenberry modeled him on: "one of Horatio Nelson's captains in the South Pacific, six months away from home and three months away by communication". Povill also wrote up a list of possible directors, including Coppola, Steven Spielberg, Lucas, and Robert Wise, but all were busy at the time or unwilling to work on the small budget. Philip Kaufman signed on to direct and was given an introductory course in the series, with Roddenberry screening ten episodes of the television series for him. By the fall of 1976, the project was building momentum. During this time, fans organized a mail campaign that flooded the White House with letters, influencing Gerald Ford to rechristen the Space Shuttle Constitution the Enterprise, and Roddenberry and most of the Star Trek cast were present for its rollout.

On October 8, 1976, Bryant and Scott delivered a 20-page treatment, Planet of the Titans, which executives Barry Diller, Jeffrey Katzenberg and Michael Eisner liked. In it, Kirk and his crew encounter beings they believe to be the mythical Titans and travel back millions of years in time, accidentally teaching early man to make fire. Planet of the Titans also explored the concept of the third eye. With the studio finally moving forward with a treatment, Roddenberry stopped work on other projects to refocus on Star Trek, and the screenwriters and Isenberg were deluged with grateful fan mail. Isenberg began scouting filming locations and hired designers and illustrators. Key among these were production designer Ken Adam, who in turn hired artist Ralph McQuarrie, fresh off the yet to be released Star Wars. They worked on designs for planets, planetary and asteroid bases, a black hole "shroud", a crystalline "super brain", and new concepts for the Enterprise, including interiors that Adam later revisited for the film Moonraker and a flat-hulled starship design (frequently credited to McQuarrie, but which McQuarrie's own book identifies as an Adam design). McQuarrie wrote that "there was no script" and that much of the work was "winging it". When that film folded after three months for Adam and "a month and a half" for McQuarrie, their concepts were shelved, although a handful of them were revisited in later productions.

The first draft of the completed script was not finished until March 1, 1977, and it was described as "a script by committee" and rejected by the studio a few weeks later. Bryant and Scott had been caught between Roddenberry and Kaufman's conflicting ideas of what the film should be and Paramount's indecision. Feeling it was "physically impossible" to produce a script that satisfied all parties, they left the project by mutual consent on March 18, 1977. "We begged to be fired." Kaufman reconceived the story with Spock as the captain of his own ship and featuring Toshiro Mifune as Spock's Klingon nemesis, but on May 8 Katzenberg informed the director that the film was cancelled, less than three weeks before Star Wars was released.

=== Phase II and restart ===
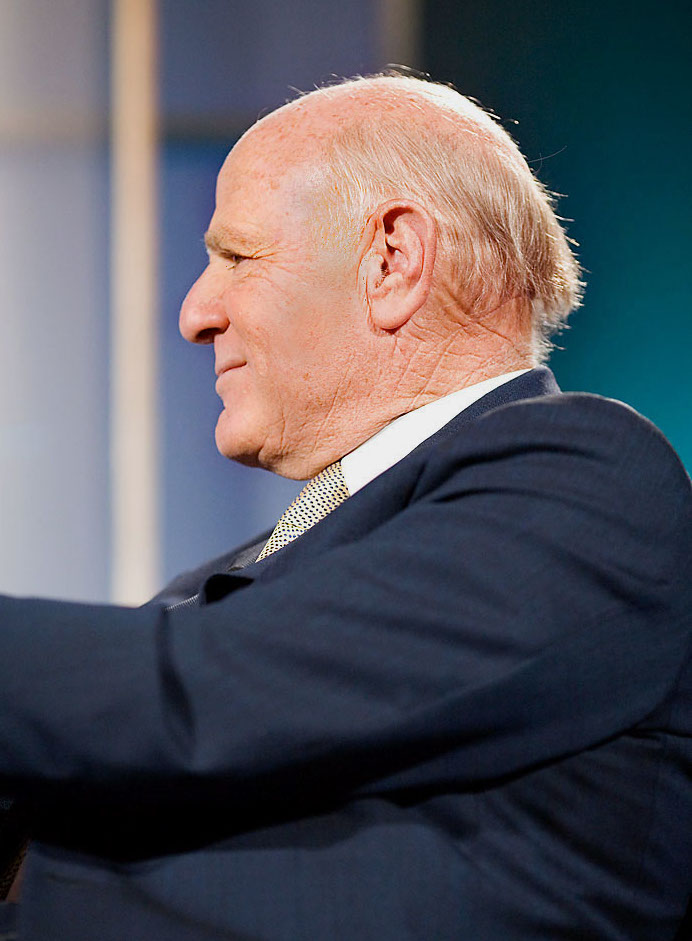
Barry Diller planned on anchoring a new Paramount television network with a new Star Trek series.

Barry Diller had grown concerned by the direction Star Trek had taken in Planet of the Titans, and suggested to Roddenberry that it was time to take the franchise back to its roots as a television series. Diller planned on a new Star Trek series forming the cornerstone for a new television network. Though Paramount was reluctant to abandon its work on the film, Roddenberry wanted to bring many of the production staff from the original series to work on the new show, titled Star Trek: Phase II.

Producer Harold Livingston was assigned to find writers for new episodes, while Roddenberry prepared a writers' guide briefing the uninitiated on the franchise canon. Of the original cast, only Leonard Nimoy stated he would not return. Roddenberry created a Vulcan prodigy character named Xon to replace Spock, and since Xon was too young to fill the role of first officer, Roddenberry subsequently developed the characters of Decker and Ilia. The new series' pilot episode "In Thy Image" was based on a two-page outline by Roddenberry about a NASA probe returning to Earth, having gained sentience. Alan Dean Foster wrote a treatment for the pilot, which Livingston turned into a teleplay. When the script was presented to Michael Eisner, he declared it worthy of a feature film. At the same time, the success of Close Encounters of the Third Kind showed Paramount that the box office success of Star Wars could be repeated. On November 11, just two and a half weeks before production on Phase II was due to start, the studio announced that the television series had been canceled in favor of a new feature film. Cast and crew who had been hired that Monday were laid off by Friday, and construction came to a halt. Production was moved to April 1978 so that the necessary scripts, sets, and wardrobe could be upgraded.

On March 28, 1978, Paramount assembled the largest press conference held at the studio since Cecil B. DeMille announced he was making The Ten Commandments. Eisner announced that Robert Wise would direct a film adaptation of the television series titled Star Trek—The Motion Picture. Wise had seen only a few Star Trek episodes, so Paramount gave him about a dozen to watch. The budget was projected at $15 million.

The writers began to adapt "In Thy Image" into a film script, but it was not completed until four months after production commenced. Wise felt that the story was sound, but the action and visuals could be made more exciting. As the planned start of photography in late spring 1978 approached, it was clear production would not be ready. Time was of the essence now that every major studio had such a film in the works, because Paramount was worried that their science fiction film would appear at the tail end of a cycle. Livingston described the writers' issue with the story thus:

We had a marvelous antagonist, so omnipotent that for us to defeat it or even communicate with it, or have any kind of relationship with it, made the initial concept of the story false. Here's this gigantic machine that's a million years further advanced than we are. Now, how the hell can we possibly deal with this? On what level? As the story developed, everything worked until the very end. How do you resolve this thing? If humans can defeat this marvelous machine, it's really not so great, is it? Or if it really is great, will we like those humans who do defeat it? Should they defeat it? Who is the story's hero anyway? That was the problem. We experimented with all kinds of approaches...we didn't know what to do with the ending. We always ended up against a blank wall.

Koenig described the state of the script at the start of filming as a three-act screenplay without a third act. Because of likely changes, actors were at first told to not memorize the last third of the script, which received constant input from actors and producers. Scenes were rewritten so often it became necessary to note on script pages the hour of the revision and dialogue was being rewritten for scenes that had already been shot. Povill credited Nimoy with suggesting the scene where Spock tears up, and the discussion of V'Ger's need to evolve. A final draft of the third act was approved in late September 1978, but had it not been for a Penthouse interview where NASA scientist Robert Jastrow said that mechanical forms of life were likely, the ending might not have been approved by the studio. By March 1979, fewer than 20 pages from the original 150 in the screenplay had been retained.

=== Design ===
The first new sets (intended for Phase II) were constructed beginning July 25, 1977. The fabrication was supervised by Joseph Jennings, an art director involved in the original television series, special effects expert Jim Rugg, and former Trek designer Matt Jefferies, on loan as consultant from Little House on the Prairie. When the television series was canceled and plans for a film put into place, new sets were needed for the large 70 mm film format.

Wise asked Harold Michelson to be the film's production designer, and Michelson was put to work on finishing the incomplete Phase II sets. He began with the bridge, which had nearly been completed. Michelson first removed Chekov's new weapons station, a semicircular plastic bubble grafted onto one side of the bridge wall. The idea for Phase II was that Chekov would have looked out toward space while cross-hairs in the bubble tracked targets. Wise instead wanted Chekov's station to face the Enterprise's main viewer, a difficult request as the set was primarily circular. Production illustrator Michael Minor created a new look for the station using a flat edge in the corner of the set.

The bridge ceiling was redesigned, with Michelson taking structural inspiration from a jet engine fan. Minor built a central bubble for the ceiling to give the bridge a human touch. Ostensibly, the bubble functioned as a piece of sophisticated equipment designed to inform the captain of the ship's attitude. Most of the bridge consoles, designed by Lee Cole, remained from the scrapped television series. Cole remained on the motion picture production and was responsible for much of the visual artwork created. To inform actors and series writers, Lee prepared an Enterprise Flight Manual as a continuity guide to control functions. All the main cast needed to be familiar with control sequences at their stations as each panel was activated by touch via heat-sensitive plates. The wattage of the light bulbs beneath the plastic console buttons was reduced from 25 watts to 6 watts after the generated heat began melting the controls. The seats were covered in girdle material, used because of its stretching capacity and ability to be easily dyed. For the science station, two consoles were rigged for hydraulic operation so that they could be rolled into the walls when not in use, but the system was disconnected when the crew discovered it would be easier to move them by hand.

Aside from control interfaces, the bridge set was populated with monitors looping animations. Each oval monitor was a rear-projection screen on which super 8 mm and 16 mm film sequences looped for each special effect. The production acquired 42 films for this purpose from an Arlington, Virginia-based company, Stowmar Enterprises. Stowmar's footage was exhausted only a few weeks into filming, and it became clear that new monitor films would be needed faster than an outside supplier could deliver them. Cole, Minor, and another production designer, Rick Sternbach, worked together with Povill to devise faster ways of shooting new footage. Cole and Povill rented an oscilloscope for a day and filmed its distortions. Other loops came from Long Beach Hospital, the University of California at San Diego, and experimental computer labs in New Mexico. In all, over 200 pieces of monitor footage were created and cataloged into a seven-page listing.

The Enterprise engine room was redesigned while keeping consistent with the theory that the interior appearance had to match the corresponding area visible in exterior views of the starship. Michelson wanted the engine room to seem vast, a difficult effect to achieve on a small sound stage. To create the illusion of depth and long visible distances, the art department staff worked on designs that would use forced perspective; set designer Lewis Splittgerber considered the engine room the most difficult set to realize. On film the engine room appeared hundreds of feet long, but the set was actually only 40 feet (12 m) in length. To achieve the proper look, the floor slanted upward and narrowed, while small actors three, four, and five feet in height were used as extras to give the appearance of being far from the camera. For "down shots" of the engineering complex, floor paintings extended the length of the warp core several stories. J. C. Backings created these paintings; similar backings were used to extend the length of ship corridors and the Recreation room set.

Redesigning the Enterprise corridors was also Michelson's responsibility. Originally, the corridors were of straight plywood construction, similar to those seen in the original series, which Roddenberry called "Des Moines Holiday Inn Style". To move away from that look, Michelson created a new angular design. Roddenberry and Wise agreed with Michelson that in 300 years, lighting did not need to be overhead, so lighting radiated upward from the floor. Different lighting schemes were used to simulate different decks of the ship with the same length of corridor. Aluminum panels on the walls outside Kirk's and Ilia's quarters were covered with an orange ultrasuede to represent the living area of the ship.

The transporter had originally been developed for the television series as a matter of convenience; it would have been prohibitively expensive to show the Enterprise land on every new planet. For the redesign, Michelson felt that the transporter should look and feel more powerful. He added a sealed control room that would protect operators from the powerful forces at work. The space between the transporter platform and the operators was filled with complex machinery, and cinematographer Richard Kline added eerie lighting for atmosphere.

After the redesign of the Enterprise sets was complete, Michelson turned his attention to creating the original sets needed for the film. The recreation deck occupied an entire soundstage, dwarfing the room built for the planned television series; this was the largest interior in the film. The set was 24 feet (7.3 m) high, decorated with 107 pieces of custom-designed furniture, and packed with 300 people for filming. Below a large viewing screen on one end of the set was a series of art panels containing illustrations of previous ships bearing the name Enterprise. One of the ships was NASA's own Enterprise, added per Roddenberry's request:

Some fans have suggested that our new Enterprise should carry a plaque somewhere which commemorates the fact it was named after the first space shuttle launched from Earth in 1970s. This is an intriguing idea. It also has publicity advantages if properly released at the right time. It won't hurt NASA's feelings either. I'll leave it to you where you want it on the vessel.

Another large construction task was the V'ger set, referred to by the production staff as "the Coliseum" or "the microwave wok". The set was designed and fabricated in four and a half weeks, and was filmable from all angles; parts of the set were designed to pull away for better camera access at the center. During production, Star Trek used 11 of Paramount's 32 sound stages, more than any other film done there at the time. To save money, construction coordinator Gene Kelley struck sets with his own crew immediately after filming, lest Paramount charge the production to have the sets dismantled. The final cost for constructing the sets ran at approximately $1.99 million (equivalent to $8.83 million in 2025), not counting additional costs for Phase II fabrication.

=== Props and models ===
The first Star Trek movie models constructed were small study models for Planet of the Titans based on designs by Adam and McQuarrie, but these flat-hulled Enterprise concepts were abandoned when that film was cancelled (although one was later used in the space-dock in the movie Star Trek III: The Search for Spock, and another later appeared in the Star Trek: The Next Generation episode "The Best of Both Worlds").

When the project became The Motion Picture, Robert Abel and Associates (RA&A) art director Richard Taylor wanted to completely redesign the ship, but Roddenberry insisted on the same shape as designed by Jefferies for Phase II. Taylor focused on the details, giving it a stylization he considered "almost Art Deco". Concept artist Andrew Probert helped refine the redesign. The general shape and proportions of the Phase II ship were retained, but the angles, curves and details refined. Taylor took on the nacelles, and Probert the rest of the ship. Changes included "radiator grill" nacelle caps, a glowing deflector dish, a new impulse engine, new shapes for the aft end and hangar doors of the secondary hull, more docking ports, rounder windows, hatches, and windows for an observation lounge, recreation deck, and arboretum. Probert also replaced the Phase II ship weapons tube with a twin launcher torpedo deck and added elements such as features for a separating saucer and landing pads that were never utilized on any film featuring the model.

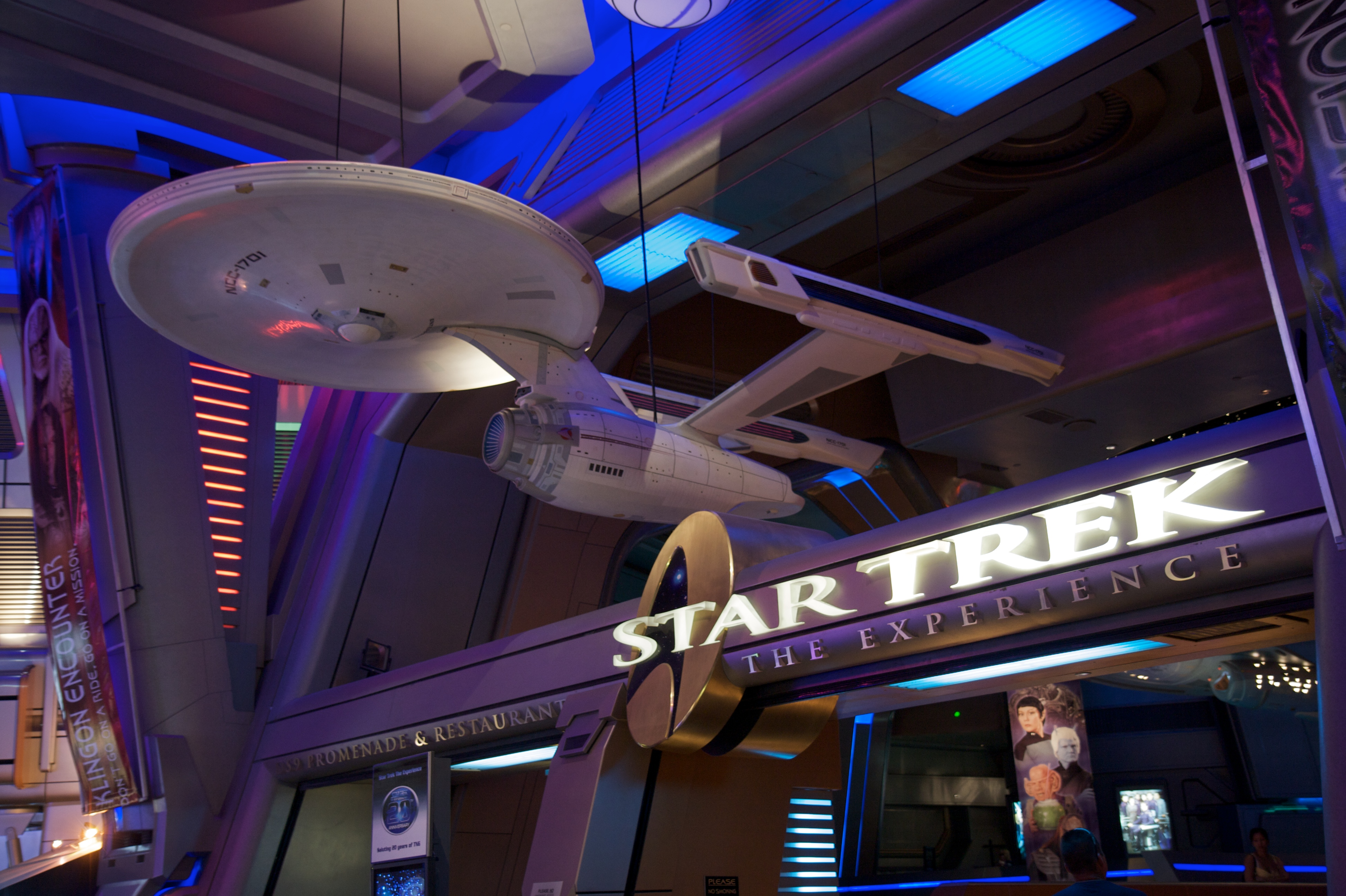
Replica of the Enterprise NCC-1701 redesign

Most of the models in The Motion Picture were designed by Magicam, a Paramount subsidiary. The main Enterprise model was eight feet long, to a scale of 1/120th scale size, or 1 inch (2.5 cm) to 10 feet (3.0 m). It took 14 months and $150,000 to build. Instead of standard fiberglass used for older models, the new Enterprise was constructed with lightweight plastics, weighing 85 pounds (39 kg). The biggest design issue was making sure that the connective dorsal neck and twin warp nacelle struts were strong enough so that no part of the ship model would sag, bend, or quiver when the model was being moved, which was accomplished via an arc-welded aluminum skeleton. The completed model could be supported at one of five possible points as each photographic angle required. A second, 20-inch (51 cm) model of the ship was used for long shots. While the hull surface was kept smooth, it was treated with a special paint finish that made its surface appear iridescent in certain light. Transparencies of the film's sets were inserted behind some windows, and as jokes, some featured Probert, other production staff members, and Mickey Mouse. Magicam also produced the orbital dry dock seen during the Enterprise's first appearance in the film. Measuring 4 ft × 10 ft × 6 ft (1.2 m × 3.0 m × 1.8 m), its 56 neon panels required 168,000 volts of electricity to operate, with a separate table to support the transformers.

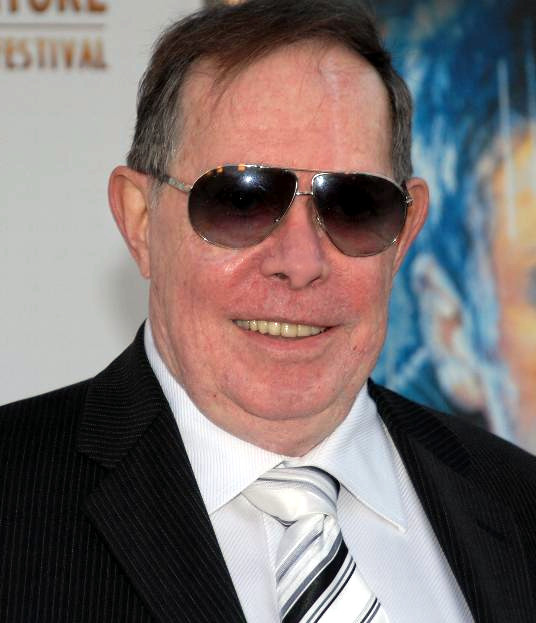
After the original model was rejected, designer Syd Mead created a new version of the V'Ger ship.

The creation of V'Ger caused problems for the entire production. The crew was dissatisfied with the original four-foot clay model created by the Abel group, which looked like a modernized Nemo's Nautilus submarine. Industrial designer Syd Mead was hired to visualize a new version of the mammoth craft. Mead created a machine that contained organic elements based on input from Wise, Roddenberry, and the effects leads. The final model was 68 feet (21 m) long, built from the rear forward so that the camera crews could shoot footage while the next sections were still being fabricated. The model was built out of a plethora of materials—wood, foam, macramé, Styrofoam cups, incandescent, neon and strobe lights.

Dick Rubin handled the film's props and set up a makeshift office in the corner of stage 9 throughout production. Rubin's philosophy as property master was that nearly every actor or extra ought to have something in their hands. As such, Rubin devised and fabricated about 350 props for the film, 55 of which were used in the San Francisco tram scene alone. Many of the props were updated designs of items previously seen in the television series, such as phasers and handheld communicators. The only prop that remained from the original television series was Uhura's wireless earpiece, which Nichols requested on the first day of shooting (and all the production crew save those who had worked on the television show had forgotten about). The new phaser was entirely self-contained, with its own circuitry, batteries, and four blinking lights. The prop came with a hefty $4000 price tag; to save money, the lights were dropped, reducing the size of the phaser by a third. A total of 15 of the devices were made for the film. The communicators were radically altered, as by the 1970s the micro-miniaturization of electronics convinced Roddenberry that the bulky handheld devices of the television series were no longer believable. A wrist-based design was decided upon, with the provision that it look far different from the watch Dick Tracy had been using since the 1930s. Two hundred communicators were fashioned, but only a few were the $3500 top models, used for close-ups of the device in action. Most of the props were made from plastic, as Rubin thought that in the future man-made materials would be used almost exclusively.

=== Costumes and makeup ===
Roddenberry firmly believed that throwaway clothes were the future of the industry, and this idea was incorporated into the costumes of The Motion Picture. William Ware Theiss, the designer who created the original television series costumes, was too busy to work on the film. Instead, Robert Fletcher, considered one of American theater's most successful costume and scenic designers, was selected to design the new uniforms, suits, and robes for the production. Fletcher eschewed man-made synthetics for natural materials, finding that these fabrics sewed better and lasted longer. As times had changed, the brightly multicolored Starfleet uniforms were revised: the miniskirts worn by women in the original series would now be considered sexist, and Wise and Fletcher deemed the colors garish and working against believability on the big screen. Fletcher's first task was to create new, less conspicuous uniforms.

In the original series, divisions in ship assignments were denoted by shirt color; for the movie, these color codes were moved to small patches on each person's uniform. The Starfleet delta symbol was standardized and superimposed over a circle of color indicating area of service. The blue color of previous uniforms was discarded, for fear they might interfere with the blue screens used for optical effects. Three types of uniforms were fabricated: dress uniforms used for special occasions, Class A uniforms for regular duty, and Class B uniforms as an alternative. The Class A designs were double-stitched in gabardine and featured gold braid designating rank. Fletcher designed the Class B uniform as similar to evolved T-shirts, with shoulder boards used to indicate rank and service divisions. Each costume had the shoes built into the pant leg to further the futuristic look. An Italian shoemaker decorated by the Italian government for making Gucci shoes was tasked with creating the futuristic footwear. Combining the shoes and trousers was difficult, time-consuming, and expensive, as each shoe had to be sewn by hand after being fitted to each principal actor. There were difficulties in communication, as the shoemaker spoke limited English and occasionally confused shoe orders due to similar-sounding names. Jumpsuits, serving a more utilitarian function, were the only costumes to have pockets, and were made with a heavyweight spandex that required a special needle to puncture the thick material. A variety of field jackets, leisure wear, and spacesuits were also created; as these parts had to be designed and completed before most of the actors' parts had been cast, many roles were filled by considering how well the actors would fit into existing costumes.

For the civilians of San Francisco, Fletcher decided on a greater freedom in dress. Much of the materials for these casual clothes were found in the old storerooms at Paramount, where a large amount of unused or forgotten material lay in storage. One bolt of material had been handpicked by Cecil DeMille in 1939, and was in perfect condition. The red, black, and gold brocade was woven with real gold and silver wrapped around silk thread; the resulting costume was used for a background Betelgeusean ambassador and, at a price of $10,000 for the fabric alone, was the most expensive costume ever worn by a Hollywood extra. Fletcher also recycled suedes from The Ten Commandments for other costumes. With the approval of Roddenberry, Fletcher fashioned complete backgrounds for the alien races seen in the Earth and recreation deck sequences, describing their appearances and the composition of their costumes.

Fred Phillips, the original designer of Spock's Vulcan ears, served as The Motion Picture's makeup artist. He and his staff were responsible for fifty masks and makeup for the aliens seen in the film. The designs were developed by Phillips or from his sketches. In his long association with Star Trek, Phillips produced his 2,000th Spock ear during the production of The Motion Picture. Each ear was made of latex and other ingredients blended together in a kitchen mixer, then baked for six hours. Though Phillips had saved the original television series casts used for making the appliances, Nimoy's ears had grown in the decade since and new molds had to be fabricated. While on the small screen the ears could be used up to four times, since nicks and tears did not show up on television, Phillips had to create around three pairs a day for Nimoy during filming. The upswept Vulcan eyebrows needed to be applied hair by hair for proper detail, and it took Nimoy more than two hours to prepare for filming—twice as long as it had for television.

Besides developing Vulcan ears and alien masks, Phillips and his assistant Charles Schram applied more routine makeup to the principal actors. Khambatta's head was freshly shaved each day, then given an application of makeup to reduce glare from the hot set lights. Khambatta had no qualms about shaving her head at first, but began worrying if her hair would grow back properly. Roddenberry proposed insuring Khambatta's hair after the actress voiced her concerns, believing it would be good publicity, but legal teams determined such a scheme would be very costly. Instead, Khambatta visited the Georgette Klinger Skin Care Salon in Beverly Hills, where the studio footed the bill for the recommended six facials and scalp treatments during production, as well as a daily scalp treatment routine of cleansers and lotion. Collins described Khambatta as very patient and professional while her scalp was shaved and treated for up to two hours each day. Khambatta spent six months following the regimen; her hair eventually regrew without issue, though she kept her shaven locks after production had ended.

=== Technical consulting ===
In the decade between the end of the Star Trek television series and the film, many of the futuristic technologies that appeared on the show—electronic doors that open automatically, talking computers, weapons that stun rather than kill, and personal communication devices—had become a reality. Roddenberry had insisted that the technology aboard the Enterprise be grounded in established science and scientific theories. The Motion Picture likewise received technical consultation from NASA, the Jet Propulsion Laboratory (JPL) at California Institute of Technology, and the Massachusetts Institute of Technology, as well as individuals such as former astronaut Rusty Schweickart and the science fiction writer Isaac Asimov.

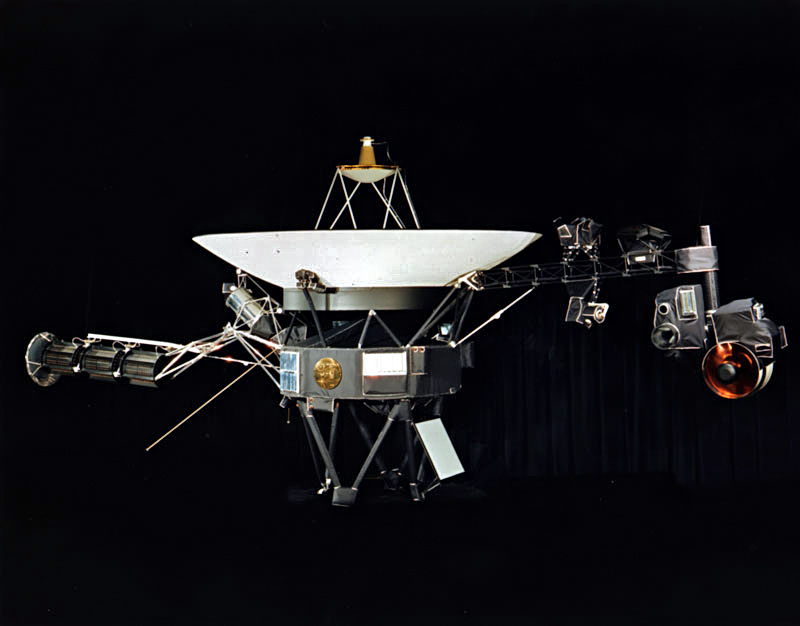
In the film's climax, the crew encounters the derelict Voyager 6. Only two were launched in real life, but the probe depicted in the film is visually identical to those.

The greatest amount of technical advice for the production came from NASA, who provided Trek fan Jesco von Puttkamer as advisor to the film. Roddenberry had known Puttkamer since 1975, when they had been introduced by a mutual friend, the assistant director of astronautics at the Smithsonian Institution. From 1976 until the completion of the film Puttkamer provided the writers, producer, and director with memos on everything technical in the script; the scientist reviewed every line in the script, and was unpaid for his assistance. "Science fiction films, including those of the recent past, have been woefully short of good science advice", he said. "Star Wars [is] really not science fiction. I loved it, but it's a fairy tale of princes and knights in another galaxy. The technology was improbable, the science impossible."

Theater audiences shared Kirk's surprise that V'Ger is originally from Earth; by the film's premiere, they were familiar with Voyager 1 and 2's widely publicized visits to Jupiter in mid-1979. Although Roddenberry was unable to borrow JPL's Voyager mockup for filming, von Puttkamer assured Roddenberry that any future Voyager 6 (Voyager 18 in early script drafts) would resemble 1 and 2, so production staff could use technical diagrams from JPL's John Casani, and photographs of the mockup, when building their own. The film version was three quarters of the size of the actual Voyagers.

During the rewrite of the final scenes, the studio executives clashed with Roddenberry about the script's ending, believing that the concept of a living machine was too far-fetched. The executives consulted Asimov: if the writer decided a sentient machine was plausible, the ending could stay. Asimov loved the ending, but made one small suggestion; he felt that the use of the word "wormhole" was incorrect, and that the anomaly that the Enterprise found itself in would be more accurately called a "temporal tunnel".

=== Filming ===
Filming of The Motion Picture began on August 7, 1978. A few small ceremonies were performed before photography began; Roddenberry gave Wise his baseball cap, a gift from the captain of the nuclear carrier Enterprise. Wise and Roddenberry then cracked a breakaway bottle of champagne on the bridge set (with no champagne inside to avoid damaging the set). The scene of the busy crew on the Enterprise bridge just prior to Kirk's arrival was the first to be shot; Wise directed 15 takes into the late afternoon before he was satisfied with the scene. The first day's shots used 1,650 feet (500 m) of film; 420 feet (130 m) were considered "good", 1,070 feet (330 m) were judged "no good", and 160 feet (49 m) were wasted; only one-and-one-eighth pages had been shot.

Alex Weldon was hired to be supervisor of special effects for the film. (Note: Special effects in this context refers to live effects done during filming, while optical or visual effects are done in post-production after the completion of principal photography (Sackett, 159).) Weldon was planning on retiring after 42 years of effects work, but his wife urged him to take on Star Trek because she thought he did not have enough to do. When Weldon was hired, many of the effects had already been started or completed by Rugg; it was up to Weldon to complete more complex and higher-budgeted effects for the motion picture. The first step of preparation involved analyzing the script in the number, duration, and type of effects. Before costs could be determined and Weldon could shop for necessary items, he and the other members of the special effects team worked out all possibilities for pulling off the effects in a convincing manner.

Richard H. Kline served as the film's cinematographer. Working from sketch artist Maurice Zuberano's concepts, Wise would judge if they were on the right track. Kline and Michelson would then discuss the look they wanted (along with Weldon, if effects were involved). Each sequence was then storyboarded and left to Kline to execute. The cinematographer called his function to "interpret [the] preplanning and make it indelible on film. It's a way of everybody being on the same wavelength." Kline recalled that there was not a single "easy" shot to produce for the picture, as each required special consideration. The bridge, for example, was lit with a low density of light to make the console monitors display better. It was hard to frame shots so that reflections of the crew in monitors or light spilling through floor grilles were not seen in the final print.

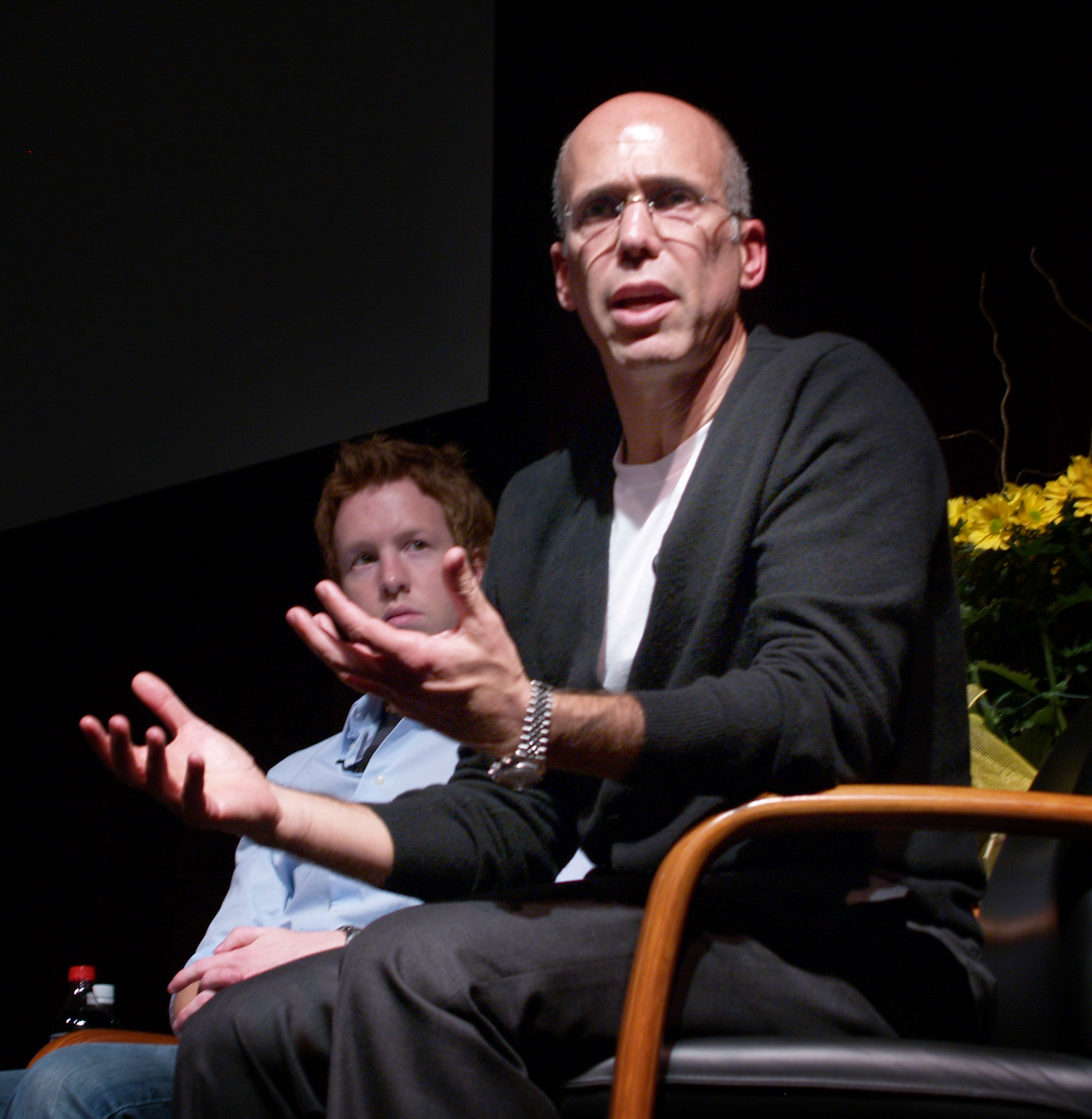
As the Paramount executive in production, Katzenberg tried to keep costs down as filming lagged behind schedule.

While Kline was concerned with lighting, print quality, and color, Bonnie Prendergast, the script supervisor, took notes that would be written up after the company had finished for the day. Prendergast's role was to ensure continuity in wardrobe, actor position, and prop placement. Any changes in dialogue or ad-libbed lines were similarly written down. Assistant director Danny McCauley was responsible for collaborating with unit production manager Phil Rawlins to finalize shooting orders and assigning extras. Rawlins, production manager Lindsley Parsons Jr., and Katzenberg were all tasked with keeping things moving as fast as possible and keeping the budget under control; every hour on stage cost the production $4000.

Despite tight security around production, in February 1978 the head of an Orange County, California Star Trek fan group reported to the FBI that a man offered to sell plans of the film set. The seller was convicted of stealing a trade secret, fined $750, and sentenced to two years' probation. Visitor's badges were created to keep track of guests, and due to the limited number were constantly checked out. Visitors included the press, fan leaders, friends of the cast and crew, and actors such as Clint Eastwood, Tony Curtis, Robin Williams and Mel Brooks. Security swept cars leaving the lots for stolen items; even the principal actors were not spared this inconvenience. New West magazine in March 1979 nonetheless revealed most of the plot, including Spock's arrival on the Enterprise, V'Ger's identity, and its reason for coming to Earth.

By August 9, the production was already a full day behind schedule. Despite the delays, Wise refused to shoot more than twelve hours on set, feeling he lost his edge afterwards. He was patient on set; betting pool organizers returned collected money when Wise never lost his cool throughout production. Koenig described working with Wise as a highlight of his career. Katzenberg called Wise the film's savior, using his experience to (as Shatner recalled) subtly make filming "actor-proof". Given his unfamiliarity with the source material Wise relied on the actors, especially Shatner, to ensure that dialogue and characterizations were consistent with the show. Gautreaux was among the actors who had not worked with a chroma key before. Wise had to explain to actors where to look and how to react to things they could not see while filming.

While the bridge scenes were shot early, trouble with filming the transporter room scene delayed further work. Crew working on the transporter platform found their footwear melting on the lighted grid while shooting tests. Issues with the wormhole sequences caused further delays. The footage for the scene was filmed two ways; first, at the standard 24 frames per second, and then at the faster 48 frames; the normal footage was a back-up if the slow-motion effect produced by the faster frame speed did not turn out as planned. The shoot dragged on so long that it became a running joke for cast members to try and top each other with wormhole-related puns. The scene was finally completed on August 24, while the transporter scenes were being filmed at the same time on the same soundstage.

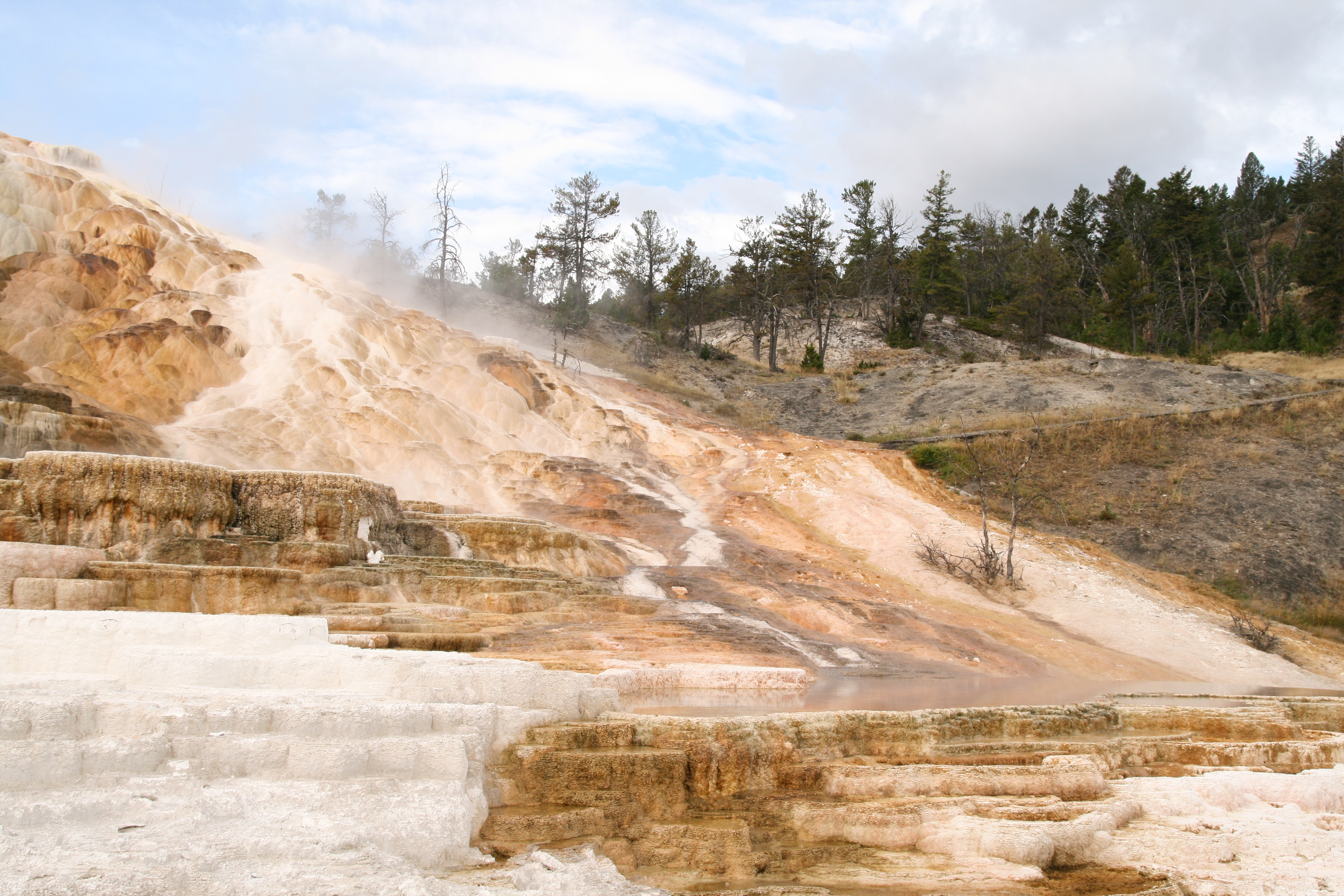
Minerva Terrace served as the stand-in for the planet Vulcan.

The planet Vulcan setting was created using a mixture of on-location photography at Minerva Hot Springs in Yellowstone National Park and set recreation. Yellowstone was selected after filming in Turkish ruins proved to be too expensive. Securing permission for filming the scenes was difficult in the middle of the summer tourist season, but the Parks Department acquiesced so long as the crew remained on the boardwalks to prevent damage to geological formations. Zuberano, who had helped select the site for the shoot, traveled to Yellowstone and returned with a number of photos. Minor also made a trip and returned to create a large painting depicting how the scene might look. In consultations with Michelson, the crew decided to use miniatures in the foreground to create the Vulcan temples, combined with the real hot springs in the background. In the film, the bottom third of the frames were composed of miniature stairs, rocks, bits of red glass and a Vulcan statue. The center of the frame contained Nimoy's shots and the park setting, while the final third of the frame was filled with a matte painting. On August 8, the day after production began at Paramount, an 11-person second unit left for Yellowstone. The sequence took three days to shoot.

On returning to Paramount, the art department had to recreate parts of Yellowstone in a large "B tank", 110 by 150 feet (34 by 46 m) long. The tank was designed to be flooded with millions of gallons of water to represent large bodies of water. Minor set up miniatures on the tank's floor before construction and made sure that the shadows that fell on Spock at Yellowstone could be properly recreated. A plywood base was built on metal platforms to create stone silhouettes, reinforced with chicken wire. Polyurethane foam was sprayed over the framework under the supervision of the Los Angeles Fire Department. The bottom part of the statue miniature was represented by a 16-foot-high (4.9 m) fiberglass foot. Weldon matched the effects filmed at Yellowstone using dry ice and steam machines. To recreate the appearance of the swirling eddies of water in the real Yellowstone, a combination of evaporated milk, white poster paint, and water was poured into the set's pools. The pressure of the steam channeled into the pools through hidden tubing causes enough movement in the whirlpools to duplicate the location footage. Due to the requirement that the sun be in a specific location for filming and that the environment be bright enough, production fell behind schedule when it was unseasonably cloudy for three days straight. Any further scenes to recreate Vulcan would be impossible, as the set was immediately torn down to serve as a parking lot for the remainder of the summer.

The computer console explosion that causes the transporter malfunction was simulated using Brillo Pads. Weldon hid steel wool inside the console and attached an arc welder to operate by remote control when the actor pulled a wire. The welder was designed to create a spark instead of actually welding, causing the steel wool to burn and make sparks; so effective was the setup that the cast members were continually startled by the flare-ups, resulting in additional takes. Various canisters and cargo containers appear to be suspended by anti-gravity throughout the film. These effects were executed by several of Weldon's assistants. The crew built a circular track that had the same shape as the corridor and suspended the antigravity prop on four small wires that connected to the track. The wires were treated with a special acid that oxidized the metal; the reaction tarnished the wires to a dull gray that would not show up in the deep blue corridor lighting. Cargo boxes were made out of light balsa wood so that fine wires could be used as support.

"Captain, there is an object in the liver of the cloud."
"You have the guts to tell me that?!"

— Nimoy and Shatner ad-lib their lines in response to constant corrections; Koenig noted that "we're falling further behind in our shooting schedule, but we're having fun doing it."

As August ended, production continued to slip farther behind schedule. Koenig learned that rather than being released in 14 days after his scenes were completed, his last day would be on October 26—eight weeks later than expected. The next bridge scenes to be filmed after the wormhole sequence, Enterprise's approach to V'Ger and the machine's resulting attack, were postponed for two weeks so that the special effects for the scene could be planned and implemented, and the engine room scenes could be shot. Chekov's burns sustained in V'Ger's attack were difficult to film; though the incident took only minutes on film, Weldon spent hours preparing the effect. A piece of aluminum foil was placed around Koenig's arm, covered by a protective pad and then hidden by the uniform sleeve. Weldon prepared an ammonia and acetic acid solution that was touched to Koenig's sleeve, causing it to smoke. Difficulties resulted in the scene being shot ten times; it was especially uncomfortable for the actor, whose arm was slightly burned when some of the solution leaked through to his arm.

Khambatta also faced difficulties during filming. She refused to appear nude as called for in the script during the Ilia probe's appearance. The producers got her to agree to wear a thin skin-colored body stocking, but she caught a cold as a result of the shower mist, created by dropping dry ice into warm water and funneling the vapors into the shower by a hidden tube. Khambatta had to leave the location repeatedly to avoid hypercapnia. One scene required the Ilia probe to slice through a steel door in the sickbay; doors made out of paper, corrugated cardboard covered in aluminum foil, and cork were tested before the proper effect was reached. The illuminated button in the hollow of the probe's throat was a 12-volt light bulb that Khambatta could turn on and off via hidden wires; the bulb's heat eventually caused a slight burn.

On January 26, 1979, the film finally wrapped after 125 days. Shatner, Nimoy, and Kelley delivered their final lines at 4:50 pm. Before the crew could go home, a final shot had to be filmed—the climactic fusing of Decker and V'Ger. The script prescribed a heavy emphasis on lighting, with spiraling and blinding white lights. Collins was covered in tiny dabs of cotton glued to his jacket; these highlights were designed to create a body halo. Helicopter lights, 4,000-watt lamps and wind machines were used to create the effect of Decker's fusion with the living machine. The first attempts at filming the scene became a nightmare for the crew. The extreme lighting caused normally invisible dust particles in the air to be illuminated, creating the appearance that the actors were caught in a blizzard. During the retakes throughout the week the crew mopped and dusted the set constantly, and it required later technical work to eliminate the dust in the final print.

Two weeks later, the entire cast and crew joined with studio executives for a traditional wrap party. (Note: The largest part of production had been completed by this time, but three live-action scenes (the San Francisco tram sequence, the Klingon bridge sequence, and the Epsilon 9 scenes) were filmed after the party during post-production.) Four hundred people attended the gathering, which spilled over into two restaurants in Beverly Hills. While much of the crew readied for post-production, Wise and Roddenberry were grateful for the opportunity to take a short vacation from the motion picture before returning to work.

=== Post-production ===
I wanted it to be this beautiful, epic, spectacular sequence that had no dialogue, no story, no plot, everything stops, and let the audience just love the Enterprise. I wanted everybody to buy into the beauty of space, and the beauty of their mission, and the beauty of the Enterprise itself, and just have everybody get out of their way and let that happen, which is something I really learned with Kubrick and 2001: Stop talking for a while, and let it all flow.

— Douglas Trumbull, on the Kirk/Scott drydock scene

While the cast departed to work on other projects, the post-production team was tasked with finalizing the film in time for a Christmas release; the resulting work would take twice as long as the filming process had taken. Editor Todd Ramsay and assistants spent principal photography syncing film and audio tracks. The resulting rough cuts were used to formulate plans for sound effects, music, and optical effects that would be added later.

Roddenberry also provided a large amount of input, sending memos to Ramsay via Wise with ideas for editing. Ramsay tried to cut as much unnecessary footage as he could as long as the film's character and story development were not damaged. One of Roddenberry's ideas was to have the Vulcans speak their own language. Because the original Vulcan scenes had been photographed with actors speaking English, the "language" needed to lip-sync with the actor's lines.

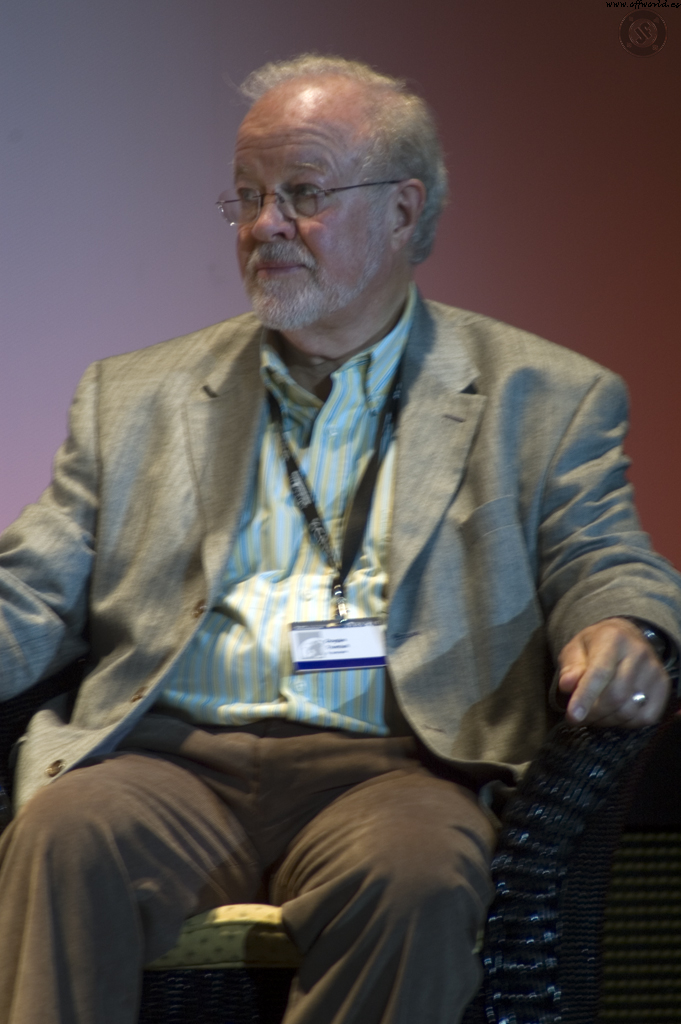
Douglas Trumbull was given the task of finishing The Motion Picture's opticals in time for a December 1979 release date.

After the groundbreaking opticals of Star Wars, Star Trek's producers realized the film required similarly high-quality visuals. Douglas Trumbull, a film director with an excellent reputation in Hollywood who had collaborated on 2001: A Space Odyssey (1968), was the first choice for director of special effects, but declined the offer. Trumbull was busy on Close Encounters of the Third Kind (1979), and was tired of being ignored as a director and having to churn out special effects for someone else's production; after completing the effects work, Trumbull planned on launching his own feature using a new film process. The next choice, John Dykstra, was similarly wrapped up in other projects. Post-production supervisor Paul Rabwin suggested Robert Abel's production company Robert Abel and Associates might be up to the task. The scope and size of the effects grew after the television movie became The Motion Picture. RA&A bid $4 million for doing the film's effects and Paramount accepted. As new effects were added, Abel increased their bid by $750,000, and Roddenberry suggested that the effects costs and schedules be reexamined.

Rumors surfaced about difficulties regarding the special effects. A year into the production, millions of dollars had been spent but almost no usable footage had been created; RA&A was not experienced in motion picture production and the steep learning curve worried the producers. Effects artist Richard Yuricich acted as a liaison between Abel and Paramount. To speed up the work, Abel passed off miniature and matte painting tasks to Yuricich. Despite being relieved of nearly half the effects work, it became clear by early 1979 that RA&A would not be able to complete the remainder on time. By then Trumbull was supervising effects, greatly reducing Abel's role. (Because of Trumbull's disinterest in only working on special effects, he reportedly received a six-figure salary and the chance to direct his own film.) Creative differences grew between RA&A and the Paramount production team; Wise reportedly became angry during a viewing of Abel's completed effects, of which the studio decided only one was usable. Paramount fired RA&A on February 22, 1979.

The studio had spent $5 million and a year's worth of time with RA&A, although Abel reportedly gained a new production studio filled with equipment using Paramount's money, and allegedly sold other Paramount-funded equipment. Trumbull had completed Close Encounters but his plan for a full feature had been canceled by Paramount, possibly as punishment for passing on Star Trek. With Trumbull now available, primary responsibility for The Motion Picture's optical effects passed on to him. Offering what Trumbull described as "an almost unlimited budget", in March the studio asked Trumbull if he could get the opticals work completed by December, the release date to which Paramount was financially committed (having accepted advances from exhibitors planning on a Christmas delivery). Trumbull was confident that he could get the work done without a loss of quality despite a reputation for missing deadlines because of his perfectionism. Paramount assigned a studio executive to Trumbull to make sure he would meet the release date, and together with Yuricich the effects team rushed to finish. The effects budget climbed to $10 million.

Trumbull recalled that Wise "trusted me implicitly" as a fellow director to complete the effects and "fix this for him". Yuricich's previous work had been as Director of Photography for Photographic Effects on Close Encounters, and he and Trumbull reassembled the crew and equipment from the feature, adding more personnel and space. Time, not money, was the main issue; Trumbull had to deliver in nine months as many effects as in Star Wars or Close Encounters combined, which had taken years to complete. The Glencoe-based facilities the teams had used for Close Encounters were deemed insufficient, and a nearby facility was rented and outfitted with five more stages equipped with camera tracks and systems. Dykstra and his 60-person production house Apogee Company were subcontracted to Trumbull. Crews worked in three shifts a day, 24 hours a day, seven days a week.

Enterprise is attacked by V'Ger's "whiplash bolt" in a scene from the director's edition DVD. In the original feature the cloud was created by Trumbull's team, while the subcontracted Apogee under Dykstra created the bolt weapon. The model features Trumbull's system of self-illumination, and was shot fully lit, with the darker passes composited and burned in post-production.

Trumbull and Dykstra found the Magicam models problematic. The Klingon cruiser's lighting was so dim that there was no way to make them bright enough on film. As Trumbull also felt the Enterprise's lights were ill-suited for his needs, he rewired both models. He thought that Enterprise should self-illuminate when traveling years from any source of light. Instead of having the ship completely dark save for viewports, Trumbull devised a system of self-illumination; he pictured the ship as something like an oceanliner, "a grand lady of the seas at night". A similar method was used on the Klingon cruiser model, but he made it less well-lit to convey a different look than the clean visuals of the Federation—the cruiser was meant to evoke "an enemy submarine in World War II that's been out at sea for too long". Trumbull wished that the Enterprise model were larger; a special periscope lens system was needed for close-up film angles. The models were filmed in multiple passes and composited together in post-production; multiple passes with only the model's lighting running were added to the original pass for the final look. The Klingon cruiser sequence was developed to avoid an opening similar to Star Wars, with one model used for all three seen in the film.

While Dykstra's team handled the ships, the V'Ger cloud was developed by Trumbull. Trumbull wanted the cloud to have a specific shape to it—"it couldn't just be a blob of cotton," he said, "it had to have some shape that you could get camera angles on." A special camera support track was built that could pan and focus over a 40-by-80-foot (12 by 24 m) piece of art, with the light strobed to provide depth. While the team planned on compositing multiple passes to provide physical movement to the cloud shots, Trumbull felt that it detracted from the sense of scale, and so small animations were subtly introduced in the final product. The torpedo effects were simulated by shooting a laser through a piece of crystal mounted on a rotating rod after experiments with Tesla coils proved insufficient. The same effect was recolored and used for the Klingons and the Enterprise; the aliens' torpedoes glowed red while the "good guys" had blue-colored weaponry. V'Ger's destruction of the ships was created using scanning lasers, with the multiple laser passes composited onto the moving model to create the final effect.

Trumbull wanted the scene of Kirk and Scott approaching the Enterprise in drydock without dialogue to "let the audience just love the Enterprise". Its two pages of script needed 45 different shots—averaging one a day—for the travel pod containing Kirk to make its flight from the space office complex to the docking ring. Double shifts around the clock were required to finish the effect on time. For close shots of the pod traveling to the Enterprise, close-ups of Shatner and Doohan were composited into the model, while in long shots lookalike puppets were used.

Dykstra and Apogee created three models to stand in for the Epsilon 9 station. A 6-by-3.5-foot (1.8 by 1.1 m) model was used for distance shots, while an isolated 5-by-6-foot (1.5 by 1.8 m) panel was used for closer shots. The station control tower was replicated with rear-projection screens to add the people inside. A 2 ft model spaceman created for the shot was used in the drydock sequence and Spock's spacewalk. Unique destruction effects for the station had to be discarded due to time constraints. V'Ger itself was filmed in a hazy, smoky room, in part to convey depth and also to hide the parts of the ship still under construction. The multiple passes were largely based on guesswork, as every single available camera was in use and the effects had to be generated without the aid of a bluescreen.

Even after the change in effects companies, Yuricich continued to provide many of the matte paintings used in the film, having previously collaborated on The Day the Earth Stood Still (1951), Ben-Hur (1959), North by Northwest (1959) and Logan's Run (1976). The paintings were combined with live-action after a selected area of the frame was matted out; the blue Earth sky over Yellowstone, for example was replaced with a red-hued Vulcan landscape. More than 100 such paintings were used.

Trumbull said that Wise and the studio gave him "a tremendous amount of creative freedom" despite being hired after the completion of nearly all the principal photography. The Spock spacewalk sequence, for example, was radically changed from the Abel version. The original plan was for Kirk to follow Spock in a spacesuit and come under attack from a mass of sensor-type organisms. Spock would save his friend, and the two would proceed through V'ger. Wise, Kline, and Abel had been unable to agree on how to photograph the sequence, and the result was a poorly designed and ungainly effect that Trumbull was convinced was disruptive to the plot and would have cost millions to fix. Instead, he recommended a stripped-down sequence that omitted Kirk entirely and would be simple and easy to shoot; Robert McCall, known for designing the original posters to 2001, provided Trumbull with concept art to inform the new event.

Post-production was so late that Paramount obtained an entire MGM sound stage to store 3,000 large metal containers for each theater around the country. Each final film reel was taken while wet from the film studio and put into a container with other reels, then taken to airplanes waiting on tarmacs. By the time The Motion Picture was finished, $26 million was spent on the film itself, while $18 million had been spent on sets for the undeveloped Phase II series, much of which were not used for the film itself, which brought the total cost of the movie to $44 million.

=== Music ===
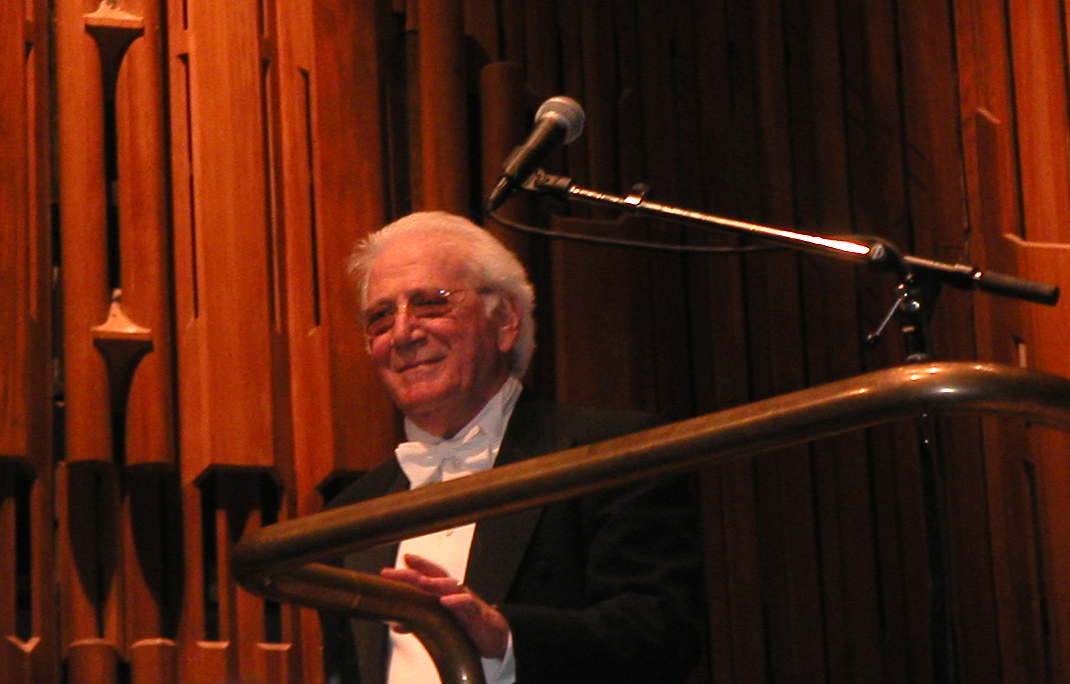
Jerry Goldsmith began a long association with Star Trek by scoring The Motion Picture.

The score for Star Trek: The Motion Picture was composed and conducted by Jerry Goldsmith and performed by the Hollywood Studio Symphony, beginning a long association with scoring Star Trek film and television. Gene Roddenberry had originally wanted Goldsmith to score Star Trek's pilot episode, "The Cage", but he was unavailable. When Wise signed on to direct, Paramount asked if he had any objection to using Goldsmith. Wise, who had worked with Goldsmith on The Sand Pebbles, replied "Hell, no. He's great!" Wise later considered his work with Goldsmith one of the best relationships he ever had with a composer.

Goldsmith was influenced by the style of the romantic, sweeping music of Star Wars. "When you stop and think about it, space is a very romantic thought. It is, to me, like the Old West, we're up in the universe. It's about discovery and new life [...] it's really the basic premise of Star Trek", he said. Goldsmith's initial bombastic main theme reminded Ramsay and Wise of sailing ships. Unable to articulate what he felt was wrong with the piece, Wise recommended writing an entirely different piece. Although irked by the rejection, Goldsmith consented to rework his initial ideas. The rewriting of the theme required changes to several sequences Goldsmith had scored without writing a main title piece. The approach of Kirk and Scott to the drydocked Enterprise by shuttle lasted a ponderous five minutes due to the effect shots coming in late and unedited, requiring Goldsmith to maintain interest with a revised and developed cue. Star Trek: The Motion Picture is the only Star Trek film to have a true overture, using "Ilia's Theme" (later re-recorded, as a lyrical version, by Shaun Cassidy as "A Star Beyond Time" with lyrics by Larry Kusik) in this role, most noticeably in the "Director's Edition" DVD release. Star Trek and The Black Hole were the only feature films to use an overture from the end of 1979 until 2000 (with Lars von Trier's Dancer in the Dark).

Much of the recording equipment used to create the movie's intricately complicated sound effects was, at the time, extremely cutting-edge. Among these pieces of equipment was the ADS (Advanced Digital Synthesizer) 11, manufactured by Pasadena, California custom synthesizer manufacturer Con Brio, Inc. The movie provided major publicity and was used to advertise the synthesizer, though no price was given. The film's soundtrack also provided a debut for the Blaster Beam, an electronic instrument 12 to 15 feet (3.7 to 4.6 m) long. It was created by musician Craig Huxley, who played a small role in an episode of the original television series. The Blaster had steel wires connected to amplifiers fitted to the main piece of aluminum; the device was played with an artillery shell. Goldsmith heard it and immediately decided to use it for V'Ger's cues. Several state-of-the-art synthesizers were used as musical instruments, notably the Yamaha CS-80, ARP 2600, Oberheim OB-X, and Serge synthesizer. An enormous pipe organ first plays the V'Ger theme on the Enterprise's approach, a literal indication of the machine's power.

Goldsmith scored The Motion Picture over a period of three to four months, a relatively relaxed schedule compared to typical production, but time pressures resulted in Goldsmith bringing on colleagues to assist in the work. Alexander Courage, composer of the original Star Trek theme, provided arrangements to accompany Kirk's log entries, while Fred Steiner wrote 11 cues of additional music, notably the music to accompany the Enterprise achieving warp speed and first meeting V'Ger. The rush to finish the rest of the film impacted the score. The final recording session finished at 2:00 am on December 1, only five days before the film's release.

A soundtrack featuring the film's music was released by Columbia Records in 1979 together with the film debut, and was one of Goldsmith's best-selling scores. Sony's Legacy Recordings released an expanded two-disc edition of the soundtrack on November 10, 1998. The album added an additional 21 minutes of music to supplement the original track list, and was resequenced to reflect the story line of the film. The first disc features as much of the score as can fit onto a 78-minute disc, while the second contains "Inside Star Trek", a spoken word documentary from the 1970s. In 2012, the score was released yet again via La-La Land Records in association with Sony Music. This 3-CD set contains the complete score for the first time, plus unreleased alternate and unused cues, in addition to the remastered original 1979 album.

The score to Star Trek: The Motion Picture went on to garner Goldsmith nominations for the Oscars, Golden Globe and Saturn awards. It is often regarded as one of the composer's greatest scores, and was also one of the American Film Institute's 250 nominated scores for their top 25 American film scores.

=== Sound effects ===
Sound designer Frank Serafine, a longtime Star Trek fan, was invited to create the sound effects for the picture. Given access to state-of-the-art audio equipment, Serafine saw the picture as the chance to modernize outdated motion picture sound techniques with digital technology. Owing to background noise such as camera operation, much of the ambient noise or dialogue captured on set was unusable; it was Serafine's job to create or recreate sounds to mix back into the scenes.

As all the sound elements such as dubbed lines or background noise came together, they were classified into three divisions: A Effects, B Effects, and C Effects. A Effects were synthesized or acoustic sounds that were important and integral to the picture—the sound of V'Ger's weapon (partly done with the blaster beam instrument) for example, or Spock's mind meld, as well as transporters, explosions, and the warp speed sound effect. B Effects consisted of minor sounds such as the clicks of switches, beeps or chimes. C Effects were subliminal sounds that set moods—crowd chatter and ambient noise. All the elements were mixed as "predubs" to speed integration into the final sound mix.

When The Motion Picture was announced, many synthesizer artists submitted demo tapes to Paramount. Ramsay and Wise consulted and decided that the film should have a unique audio style; they were particularly concerned to avoid sounds that had become pervasive and cliché from repetitive use in other science-fiction movies. Events such as Enterprise bridge viewscreen activation were kept silent to provide a more comfortable atmosphere. In contrast, almost every action on the Klingon bridge made noise to reflect the aliens' harsh aesthetic. While much of the effects were created using digital synthesizers, acoustic recordings were used as well. The wormhole's sucking sounds were created by slowing down and reversing old Paramount stock footage of a cowboy fight, while the warp acceleration "stretch" sound was built on a slowed-down cymbal crash. The crew encountered difficulty in transferring the quarter-inch (0.64 cm) tapes used for creating the sounds to the 35 mm film used for the final prints. While the film was to be released with Dolby Stereo Sound, Serafine found it was easier to mix the sounds without regard to format and add the specific format after, during the later transfer to 35 mm.

== Themes ==
According to Michele and Duncan Barrett, Roddenberry had a decidedly negative view of religion that was reflected in the Star Trek television series episodes; in the episode "Who Mourns for Adonais?", for example, the god Apollo is revealed to be a fraud, an alien rather than a divine being from Earth's past. When Apollo suggests that humans need a new pantheon of gods, Kirk dismisses the idea with the words, "We find the one quite sufficient." In comparison, religious scholar Ross Kraemer says that Roddenberry "pulled his punches" regarding religion and in the television show religion was not absent but highly private. Barrett suggests that with the Star Trek feature films this attitude of not addressing religious issues shifted.

In the television series, little time was spent pondering the fate of the dead. In The Motion Picture, meanwhile, Decker is apparently killed in merging with V'Ger, but Kirk wonders if they have seen the creation of a new life form. Decker and Ilia are listed as "missing" rather than dead, and the lighting and effects created as a result of the merge have been described as "quasimystical" and "pseudo-religious". The discussion of a new birth is framed in a reverential way. While V'Ger is a machine of near omnipotence, according to Robert Asa, the film (along with its successor, Star Trek V: The Final Frontier) "implicitly protest[s] against classical theism".

Tor.com reviewer Dan Persons noted the film features a number of characters on their own voyages of self discovery, with each defining their concept of fulfillment differently. Persons notes that the result of individual pursuits of fulfillment are damaging or pyrrhic; meaning is only satisfactorily found through interpersonal relationships.

== Release ==
=== Theatrical release ===
To coincide with the film's release, Pocket Books published a paperback novelization written by Roddenberry (Note: The authorship of the book was debated for a time, with incorrect rumors in the 1980s that it was actually ghost written by Alan Dean Foster.), the only Star Trek novel he was to write. The book adds back story and several elements that did not appear in the film; for example, the novelization confirms that Willard Decker is the son of Commodore Matt Decker from the original series episode "The Doomsday Machine"—a plot element intended for the Phase II television series and mentioned in early drafts of the film script. The novel also has a different opening scene to introduce Vejur and Kirk, concentrates in sections on Kirk's struggle with confidence in commanding the Enterprise again and expands on the romantic relationship between Decker and Ilia. The V'Ger spelling for the "intruder's" name was used exclusively in the novel Roddenberry authored, from its first appearance on page 179 of the first paperback edition of the novelization through to the account on the novel's page 241 of Kirk reading the legible "V-G-E-R" letters on the fictional "Voyager 6" space probe's damaged nameplate. In addition to the novel, Star Trek printed media included a coloring book, ship blueprints, a starship "history book," a sticker book of graphics, a home costume how-to book and a comic book adaptation published by Marvel Comics as Marvel Super Special #15 (Dec. 1979). Toys included action figures, ship models, and a variety of watches, phaser mockups and communicators. McDonald's sold special Star Trek Happy Meals. The marketing was part of a coordinated approach by Paramount and its parent conglomerate Gulf+Western to create a sustained Star Trek product line. The Motion Picture novel launched Pocket Books' Star Trek book franchise, which produced 18 consecutive bestsellers within a decade.

Owing to the rush to complete the film before the scheduled release date, Star Trek: The Motion Picture was never screened before test audiences, which Wise later stated that he regretted. On December 6, 1979, the director arrived in Washington, D.C. with a fresh print of the film at the world premiere, held at the K-B MacArthur Theater. Roddenberry, Wise, and the principal cast attended the gala function, which also served as an invitational benefit for the scholarship and youth education fund of the National Space Club. While thousands of fans were expected to attend, rain that evening reduced fan turnout to around 300. The premiere was followed by a black-tie reception at the National Air and Space Museum. More than 500 people—consisting of the cast and crew, working members of the space community, and "hardcore Trekkies" who could afford to pay $100 for admission—filled the museum.

=== Home media ===
Paramount Home Entertainment released the film on VHS, Betamax, LaserDisc, and CED videodisc in 1980 in its original theatrical version.

In 1983, an extended cut premiered on the ABC television network. It added around 12 minutes to the film. The added footage was largely unfinished and cobbled together for the network premiere. This "Special Longer Version" was released on VHS, Betamax and LaserDisc by Paramount in 1983 in pan and scan format.

Two members of Wise's production company, David C. Fein and Michael Matessino, approached Wise and Paramount and persuaded them to release a revised version of the film on video; Paramount released the updated Director's Edition of the film on VHS and DVD on November 6, 2001. Wise, who had always considered the original theatrical presentation of the film a "rough cut", was given the opportunity to re-edit the film to be more consistent with his original vision. The production team used the original script, surviving sequence storyboards, memos, and the director's recollections. In addition to cuts in some sequences, 90 new and redesigned computer-generated images were created. Care was taken that the updated effects meshed seamlessly with the original footage. The edition runs 136 minutes, about four minutes longer than the original release. Included among the special features are the deleted scenes which had been part of the television cut.

Aside from the effects, the soundtrack was remixed. Ambient noise such as the sound of bridge controls were added to enhance certain scenes. Goldsmith had always suspected that some overly long cues could be shortened, so he made the cues repetitive. Although no new scenes were added, the MPAA rated the revised edition PG in contrast to the G rating of the original release. Fein attributed the rating change to the more "intense" sound mix that made scenes such as the central part of V'Ger "more menacing".

The Director's Edition was far better received by critics than the original 1979 release, with some considering the edit to have subsequently turned the film into one of the series' best. The DVD Journal's Mark Bourne said it showcased "a brisker, more attractive version of the movie" that was "as good as it might have been in 1979. Even better maybe." Complaints included the edition's 2.17:1 aspect ratio, as opposed to the original 2.40:1 Panavision. Jeremy Conrad of IGN felt that despite the changes, the pacing might still be too slow for some viewers.

The film's original theatrical cut was released on Blu-ray Disc in May 2009 to coincide with the new Star Trek feature, packaged with the five following features as the Star Trek: Original Motion Picture Collection. The Motion Picture was remastered in 1080p high definition. All six films in the set have 7.1 Dolby TrueHD audio. The disc features a new commentary track by Star Trek authors and contributors Michael and Denise Okuda, Judith and Garfield Reeves-Stevens, and Daren Dochterman. A 4K Ultra HD Blu-ray of the film was released in 2021 to commemorate the franchise's 55th anniversary. A 4K version of the Director's Edition was released in 2022.

== Reception ==
=== Box office ===
Star Trek: The Motion Picture opened in the United States and Canada on December 7, 1979, in 857 theaters and set a box office record for the highest opening weekend gross, making $11,926,421 in its first weekend. The film beat the 3-day weekend record set by Superman (1978) of $10.4 million in its third weekend (but not its 4-day weekend gross of $13.1 million) and the opening weekend gross of the 1978 reissue of Star Wars of $10.1 million. The Motion Picture earned $17 million within a week. At its widest domestic distribution, the film was shown in 1,002 theaters; it grossed $82,258,456 in the United States, making it the fifth-highest-grossing film of 1979 in that country. Overall, the film grossed $139 million worldwide. The Motion Picture was nominated for three Academy Awards: Best Art Direction, Best Visual Effects, and Best Original Score.

In the United States, the film sold the most tickets of any film in the franchise until Star Trek (2009), and it remains the highest-grossing film of the franchise worldwide adjusted for inflation, but Paramount considered its gross disappointing compared to expectations and marketing. The Motion Picture's budget of $44 million, which included the costs incurred during Phase II production, was the largest for any film made within the United States up to that time. David Gerrold estimated before its release that the film would have to gross two to three times its budget to be profitable for Paramount. Gautreaux believed that Roddenberry had not wanted Wise as director but Paramount wanted his experience, and that the two powerful men's differing visions hurt the film. The studio faulted Roddenberry's script rewrites and creative direction for the plodding pace and disappointing gross. While the performance of The Motion Picture convinced the studio to back a (cheaper) sequel, Roddenberry was forced out of its creative control. Harve Bennett and Nicholas Meyer would produce and direct Star Trek II: The Wrath of Khan, which received better reviews (becoming a fan favorite) and continued the franchise. With the successful revival of the Star Trek brand on the big screen setting an example, Hollywood increasingly turned to 1960s television series for material.

=== Critical reception ===
The Motion Picture was met with mixed reviews from critics; a 2001 retrospective for the BBC described the film as a critical failure. On the review aggregator website Rotten Tomatoes, 51% of 59 critics' reviews are positive, with an average rating of 6.0/10. The website's consensus reads: "Featuring a patchwork script and a dialogue-heavy storyline whose biggest villain is a cloud, Star Trek: The Motion Picture is a less-than-auspicious debut for the franchise." Metacritic, which uses a weighted average, assigned the film a score of 50 out of 100, based on 17 critics, indicating "mixed or average" reviews.

Roger Ebert, reviewing the film on Sneak Previews, liked it, calling it "fun" and "a good time". Judith Martin of The Washington Post felt that the plot was too thin to support the length of the film, although Martin felt that compared to such science-fiction films as 2001, Star Wars, and Alien, The Motion Picture's premise was "slightly cleverer". Time magazine's Richard Schickel wrote that the film consisted of spaceships that "take an unconscionable amount of time to get anywhere, and nothing of dramatic or human interest happens along the way". Schickel also lamented the lack of "boldly characterized" antagonists and battle scenes that made Star Wars fun; instead, viewers were presented with much talk, "much of it in impenetrable spaceflight jargon". David Denby of New York magazine, wrote that the slow movement of ships through space was "no longer surprising and elegant" after films such as 2001, and that much of the action consisted of the crew's reacting to things occurring on the viewscreen, which he considered to be "like watching someone else watch television". Variety, disagreed, calling the film "a search-and-destroy thriller that includes all of the ingredients the TV show's fans thrive on: the philosophical dilemma wrapped in a scenario of mind control, troubles with the space ship, the dependable and understanding Kirk, the ever-logical Spock, and suspenseful take with twist ending". Scott Bukatman reviewed the film in Ares magazine #1, and commented that "With Star Trek, Roddenberry's trick has been to wear the mask of the humanist as he plays with his Erector set. The scale of the television series arrested his vision at a comfortable and still interesting level, but the new film has finally removed the mask."

The characters and acting received a mixed reception. Stephen Godfrey of The Globe and Mail rated their performances highly: "time has cemented Leonard Nimoy's look of inscrutability as Mr. Spock [...] DeForest Kelley as Dr. McCoy is as feisty as ever, and James Doohan as Scotty still splutters about his engineering woes. At a basic level, their exchanges are those of an odd assortment of grumpy, middle-aged men bickering about office politics. They are a relief from the stars, and a delight." Godfrey's only concern was that the reunion of the old cast threatened to make casual viewers who had never seen Star Trek feel like uninvited guests. Martin considered the characters more likable than those in comparable science fiction films. Conversely, Arnold felt that the acting of the main cast (Shatner in particular) was poor; "Shatner portrays Kirk as such a supercilious old twit that one rather wishes he'd been left behind that desk", he wrote. "Shatner has perhaps the least impressive movie physique since Rod Steiger, and his acting style has begun to recall the worst of Richard Burton." Vincent Canby of The New York Times wrote that the actors did not have much to do in the effects-driven film, and were "limited to the exchanging of meaningful glances or staring intently at television monitors, usually in disbelief". Stephen Collins and Persis Khambatta were more favorably received. Gene Siskel felt the film "teeter[ed] towards being a crashing bore" whenever Khambatta was not on screen,and Jack Kroll of Newsweek felt that she had the most memorable entrance in the film. "[Khambatta] is sympathetic enough to make one hope she'll have a chance to show less skin and more hair in future films", Godfrey wrote.

Many critics felt that the special effects overshadowed other elements of the film. Canby wrote that the film "owes more to [Trumbull, Dykstra and Michelson] than it does to the director, the writers or even the producer". Livingston felt that Trumbull and Dykstra's work on the film was not as impressive as on Star Wars and Close Encounters due to the limited amount of production time. Godfrey called the effects "stunning", but conceded that they threatened to overpower the story two-thirds of the way into the film. Kroll, Martin, and Arnold agreed that the effects were not able to carry the film or gloss over its other deficiencies: "I'm not sure that Trumbull & Co. have succeeded in pulling the philosophic chestnuts of Roddenberry and his co-writers out of the fire", Arnold wrote.

James Berardinelli, reviewing the film in 1996, felt that the pace dragged and the plot bore too close a resemblance to the original series episode "The Changeling", but considered the start and end of the film to be strong. Terry Lee Rioux, Kelley's biographer, noted that the film proved "that it was the character-driven play that made all the difference in Star Trek". The slow pacing, extended reaction shots, and lack of action scenes led fans and critics to give the film a variety of nicknames, including The Slow Motion Picture, The Motion Sickness, and Where Nomad [the probe in "The Changeling"] Has Gone Before.

=== Accolades ===
Year	Award	Category	Winners/Nominees	Result
1980	Academy Awards	Best Art Direction	Harold Michelson, Joe Jennings, Leon Harris & John Vallone (Art Direction), Linda DeScenna (Set Decoration)	Nominated
1980	Academy Awards	Best Visual Effects	Douglas Trumbull, John Dykstra, Richard Yuricich, Robert Swarthe, Dave Stewart & Grant McCune	Nominated
1980	Academy Awards	Best Original Score	Jerry Goldsmith	Nominated
1980	Golden Globe Awards	Best Original Score	Jerry Goldsmith	Nominated
1980	Saturn Awards	Best Science Fiction Film	Gene Roddenberry	Nominated
1980	Saturn Awards	Best Director	Robert Wise	Nominated
1980	Saturn Awards	Best Actor	William Shatner	Nominated
1980	Saturn Awards	Best Actress	Persis Khambatta	Nominated
1980	Saturn Awards	Best Supporting Actor	Leonard Nimoy	Nominated
1980	Saturn Awards	Best Supporting Actress	Nichelle Nichols	Nominated
1980	Saturn Awards	Best Music	Jerry Goldsmith	Nominated
1980	Saturn Awards	Best Costumes	Robert Fletcher	Nominated
1980	Saturn Awards	Best Make-up	Fred Phillips, Janna Phillips & Ve Neill	Nominated
1980	Saturn Awards	Best Special Effects	John Dykstra, Douglas Trumbull & Richard Yuricich	Won
1980	Hugo Awards	Best Dramatic Presentation	Robert Wise (director), Harold Livingston (screenplay), Alan Dean Foster (story) & Gene Roddenberry (story)	Nominated

The film is recognized by American Film Institute in these lists:

- 2003: AFI's 100 Years...100 Heroes & Villains:
  - James T. Kirk – Nominated Hero
- 2005: AFI's 100 Years of Film Scores – Nominated

== See also ==
- List of films featuring extraterrestrials
- List of films featuring space stations
- Star Trek (film franchise)
