= Kick Me (film) =

1975 film by Robert Swarthe

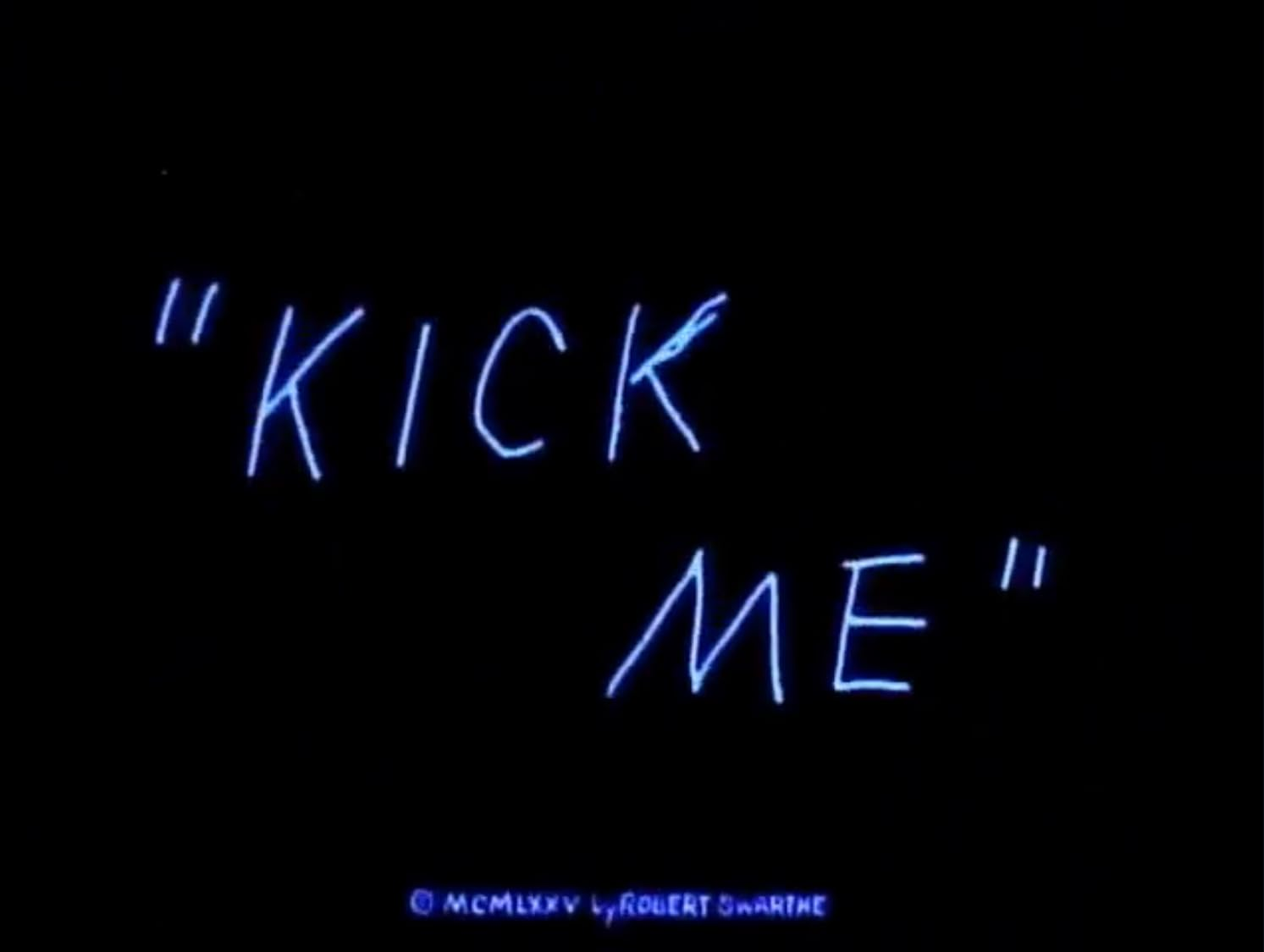
- Title card
- Directed by: Robert Swarthe
- Distributed by: Little Red Filmhouse
- Release date: 1975
- Running time: 8 minutes
- Country: United States

Kick Me is a 1975 American independent animated short film made by Robert Swarthe.

== Summary ==
The film is about a pair of red legs and its misadventures on celluloid film involving a giant baseball and spiders.

== Production ==
The animation was produced by drawing pictures directly onto frames of film stock, instead of by inking/painting and photographing cels as in traditional animation techniques of the era.

== Reception and legacy ==
It was nominated for Academy Award for Best Animated Short Film and was featured on Fantastic Animation Festival.

Kick Me was named to the ALA Notable Children's Videos list in 1976.

It was preserved by the Academy Film Archive in 2010.
