= Mickey Mouse in Vietnam =

1969 animated short film

Short Subject (Mickey Mouse in Vietnam)
- Short Subject, without soundtrack
- Directed by: Whitney Lee Savage
- Produced by: Milton Glaser
- Color process: Black and white
- Production companies: Max Cats and Whittesey Sledge Studios
- Release date: 1969
- Running time: 1 minute
- Country: United States

Short Subject, more commonly known as Mickey Mouse in Vietnam, is a 16 mm animated anti-war underground film with a run time of one minute. It was released in 1969, with Whitney Lee Savage (father of Adam Savage) as director, and Milton Glaser as designer and producer. The short was not endorsed by The Walt Disney Company.

The short has the satirical theme of Mickey Mouse volunteering for military service, and getting killed within moments of arriving in Vietnam to fight in the Vietnam War.

It was considered lost until 2013 when a YouTube user uploaded the full short, albeit with replaced music. The full short with its original music was uploaded in 2018.

== Plot ==
Mickey Mouse is seen walking happily until he sees a sign reading "Join the Army and See the World" before walking offscreen and coming back with a helmet and gun. He then travels by boat to Vietnam during the war, but moments after, while walking in the grass, he is shot in the head by an enemy. The short ends with Mickey lying dead on the ground, his smile turning slowly into a frown while blood pours from the bullet wound.

== Production ==
Mickey Mouse in Vietnam was produced under the auspices of a studio named Max Cats and Whittesey Sledge Studios. According to Glaser, it was meant for the Angry Arts Festival which, according to him, was "a kind of protest event, inviting artists to produce something to represent their concerns about the war in Vietnam and a desire to end it". Mickey Mouse was chosen due to being a symbol of innocence.

== Reception and legacy ==
Mickey Mouse in Vietnam received an award from the International Short Film Festival Oberhausen in 1970. According to Glaser it was positively received from the audience.

=== Conservation status ===
The film was erroneously thought to be lost for many years. It was shown under its French title Mickey au Vietnam or Mickey Mouse au Vietnam at the Festival Côté court de Pantin in France in 1998 and 2003. In both cases, the copy came from the French distributor ISKRA. The Cinémathèque québécoise in Montreal, Canada, used its own copy in 2004.

In April 2013, YouTube user abadhiggins uploaded the video. Five years later, in July 2018, the full short was uploaded by another YouTube user CDCB2; this version includes the opening and closing titles, the SMPTE Universal countdown film leader, and a Telecine Compact Video Systems servants entrance Disney segment VHS slide, both of which were absent in the 2013 upload, as well as the audio track, which, until then, was assumed to be completely lost. The music prominently used in the soundtrack is "The Gonk" by Herbert Chappell, while "Sanctus" from Hector Berlioz's Requiem is used for Mickey's death scene.

The film was included as part of the 2022 Disney+ documentary Mickey: The Story of a Mouse.

The short would be included as a bonus feature in the Complete Kubrick Criterion boxset's Full Metal Jacket disc.

== See also ==
- Bambi Meets Godzilla
- Bring Me the Head of Charlie Brown
- Escalation
- Uncle Walt
- Mickey au Camp de Gurs
- List of rediscovered films
- Apocalypse Pooh
