= Generation on the Wind =

1979 film

- Directed by: David Vassar
- Written by: David Vassar; Andrew Finley
- Produced by: David Vassar; Andrew Finley
- Cinematography: John Hiller
- Distributed by: PBS
- Release date: 1979
- Country: United States
- Language: English

Generation on the Wind is a 1979 documentary film produced by David Vassar and Andrew Finley. The film is a character study centered on a rag tag group of young artists, mechanics and environmental activists who successfully built the largest electrical generating windmill in the world. The documentary required one year of shooting to finish the film. Generation on the Wind aired on PBS. It was then released to educational markets by Churchill Films.

== Reception ==
David Ansen of Newsweek called Generation on the Wind "dull". Generation on the Wind was nominated for an Academy Award for Best Documentary Feature.
