= Dae (film) =

1979 film

- Directed by: Stole Popov
- Written by: Ante Popovski
- Produced by: Risto Teofilovski
- Cinematography: Miso Samoilovski
- Edited by: Dimitar Grbevski
- Production company: Vardar Film
- Release date: 1979
- Running time: 16 minutes
- Country: Yugoslavia

Dae is a 1979 Yugoslavian short documentary film directed by Stole Popov. It was nominated for an Academy Award for Best Documentary Short. It depicts a group of Roma celebrating St. George's Day (May 6).
