= Leon Harris (art director) =

American art director

- Other names: Leon R. Harris
- Occupation: Art director
- Years active: 1961-1991

Leon Harris was an American art director. He was nominated for an Academy Award in the category Best Art Direction for the film Star Trek: The Motion Picture.

== Selected filmography ==
- Star Trek: The Motion Picture (1979)
