= Grant McCune =

American special effects designer

- Born: March 27, 1943
- Died: December 27, 2010 (aged 67); Hidden Hills, California, U.S.
- Occupation: Special effects designer

Grant McCune (March 27, 1943 – December 27, 2010) was an American special effects designer whose entry into Hollywood was the uncredited creation of the great white shark in the 1975 film Jaws. His efforts there led to work on a series of major films, including his design of the robots in the Star Wars films, winning an Oscar in 1977 for his efforts in the first film in the series.

== Biography ==
McCune was born on March 27, 1943. He attended California State University, Northridge where he earned his undergraduate degree in biology and met his future wife. McCune was able to use his scientific training when he and Bill Shourt were hired in 1975 to work on creating the iconic shark in the movie Jaws, marking his start in Hollywood, though he was uncredited. He was subsequently hired to work on the Star Wars movies as the franchise's chief model maker, responsible for the design details of the robots (such as R2-D2) and alien characters in the films. He and his team earned an Academy Award for Best Visual Effects at the 50th Academy Awards for Star Wars Episode IV: A New Hope. He received a second Oscar nomination for his work on the 1979 film Star Trek: The Motion Picture. As a partner at Apogee Productions, McCune's work was featured in such films as Caddyshack before founding his own firm, which was hired to work on such movies as Speed and Spider-Man.

Interviewed by Popular Mechanics magazine in 2009, McCune described how one uses a photographer's eye in designing miniatures, using perspective and surface details to make the objects appear as realistic as possible.

McCune was married to his wife, Katherine, and had a daughter and a son. A resident of Hidden Hills, California, he died at his home there of pancreatic cancer at the age of 67 on December 27, 2010.

== Filmography ==
- Star Wars (1977) - Death Star Gunner (uncredited)
