= 1979 Los Angeles Film Critics Association Awards =

Annual US film awards ceremony

5th LAFCA Awards
- Date: December 15, 1979

Highlights
- Best Picture: Kramer vs. Kramer

The 5th Los Angeles Film Critics Association Awards, honoring the best in film for 1979, were announced on 15 December 1979 and given on 9 January 1980.

== Winners ==
- Best Picture:
  - Kramer vs. Kramer
  - Runners-up: Apocalypse Now and Breaking Away
- Best Director:
  - Robert Benton – Kramer vs. Kramer
  - Runners-up: Francis Ford Coppola – Apocalypse Now and Bob Fosse – All That Jazz
- Best Actor:
  - Dustin Hoffman – Kramer vs. Kramer
  - Runner-up: Roy Scheider – All That Jazz
- Best Actress:
  - Sally Field – Norma Rae
  - Runners-up: Marsha Mason – Chapter Two and Bette Midler – The Rose
- Best Supporting Actor:
  - Melvyn Douglas – Being There and The Seduction of Joe Tynan
- Best Supporting Actress:
  - Meryl Streep – Kramer vs. Kramer, Manhattan and The Seduction of Joe Tynan
- Best Screenplay:
  - Robert Benton – Kramer vs. Kramer
- Best Cinematography:
  - Caleb Deschanel – The Black Stallion
- Best Music Score:
  - Carmine Coppola – The Black Stallion
- Best Foreign Film:
  - Soldier of Orange (Soldaat van Oranje) • Belgium/Netherlands
  - Runner-up: The Last Wave • Australia
- New Generation Award:
  - John Carpenter
- Career Achievement Award:
  - John Huston
