= 1979 National Society of Film Critics Awards =

Annual US film award ceremony

14th NSFC Awards

January 3, 1980

Best Film:
Breaking Away

The 14th National Society of Film Critics Awards, given on January 3, 1980, honored the best filmmaking of 1979.

== Winners ==
=== Best Picture ===
1. Breaking Away
2. Kramer vs. Kramer
3. Manhattan
4. 10

=== Best Director ===
1. Woody Allen – Manhattan
1. Robert Benton – Kramer vs. Kramer
3. Peter Yates – Breaking Away
4. Blake Edwards – 10

=== Best Actor ===
1. Dustin Hoffman – Kramer vs. Kramer and Agatha
2. Peter Sellers – Being There
3. Nick Nolte – North Dallas Forty
4. Jack Lemmon – The China Syndrome
5. Klaus Kinski – Nosferatu the Vampyre (Nosferatu: Phantom der Nacht) and Woyzeck
5. Richard Pryor – Richard Pryor: Live in Concert
5. Roy Scheider – All That Jazz

=== Best Actress ===
1. Sally Field – Norma Rae
2. Hanna Schygulla – The Marriage of Maria Braun (Die Ehe der Maria Braun)
3. Bette Midler – The Rose
4. Diane Keaton – Manhattan

=== Best Supporting Actor ===
1. Frederic Forrest – Apocalypse Now and The Rose
2. Melvyn Douglas – Being There and The Seduction of Joe Tynan
3. Paul Dooley – Breaking Away
4. James Mason – Murder by Decree
4. James Woods – The Onion Field

=== Best Supporting Actress ===
1. Meryl Streep – Kramer vs. Kramer, Manhattan and The Seduction of Joe Tynan
2. Barbara Harris – The Seduction of Joe Tynan
3. Jane Alexander – Kramer vs. Kramer
3. Barbara Barrie – Breaking Away

=== Best Screenplay ===
1. Steve Tesich – Breaking Away
2. Woody Allen and Marshall Brickman – Manhattan
3. Robert Benton – Kramer vs. Kramer
4. Jerzy Kosinski and Robert C. Jones – Being There
5. Blake Edwards – 10

=== Best Cinematography ===
1. Caleb Deschanel – The Black Stallion and Being There
2. Vittorio Storaro – Apocalypse Now and Agatha
3. Néstor Almendros – Kramer vs. Kramer
4. Gordon Willis – Manhattan
