= 1979 New York Film Critics Circle Awards =

45th New York Film Critics Circle Awards

45th New York Film Critics Circle Awards

February 1, 1980

Best Picture:
Kramer vs. Kramer

The 45th New York Film Critics Circle Awards honored the best filmmaking of 1979. The winners were announced on 19 December 1979 and the awards were given on 1 February 1980.

== Winners ==
- Best Actor:
  - Dustin Hoffman - Kramer vs. Kramer
  - Runners-up: Peter Sellers - Being There and Nick Nolte - North Dallas Forty
- Best Actress:
  - Sally Field - Norma Rae
  - Runners-up: Bette Midler - The Rose and Hanna Schygulla - The Marriage of Maria Braun
- Best Director:
  - Woody Allen - Manhattan
  - Runners-up: Robert Benton - Kramer vs. Kramer and Bob Fosse - All That Jazz
- Best Film:
  - Kramer vs. Kramer
  - Runners-up: Breaking Away and Manhattan
- Best Foreign Language Film:
  - The Tree of Wooden Clogs (L'albero degli zoccoli) • Italy
  - Runners-up: La Cage aux Folles • France/Italy, Peppermint Soda (Diabolo menthe) • France and Soldier of Orange (Soldaat van Oranje) • Netherlands/Belgium
- Best Screenplay:
  - Steve Tesich - Breaking Away
  - Runners-up: Woody Allen and Marshall Brickman - Manhattan and Jerzy Kosinski - Being There
- Best Supporting Actor:
  - Melvyn Douglas - Being There
  - Runners-up: Frederic Forrest - The Rose and James Woods - The Onion Field
- Best Supporting Actress:
  - Meryl Streep - Kramer vs. Kramer and The Seduction of Joe Tynan
  - Runners-up: Jane Alexander - Kramer vs. Kramer and Barbara Barrie - Breaking Away
