= National Board of Review Awards 1979 =

Annual US film awards ceremony

51st National Board of Review Awards

February 20, 1980

The 51st National Board of Review Awards were announced on December 12, 1979, and given on February 20, 1980.

== Top Ten Films ==
1. Manhattan
2. Yanks
3. The Europeans
4. The China Syndrome
5. Breaking Away
6. Apocalypse Now
7. Being There
8. Time After Time
9. North Dallas Forty
10. Kramer vs. Kramer

== Top Foreign Films ==
1. La Cage aux Folles
2. The Tree of Wooden Clogs
3. The Marriage of Maria Braun
4. Nosferatu the Vampyre
5. Peppermint Soda

== Winners ==
- Best Film:
  - Manhattan
- Best Foreign Film:
  - La Cage aux Folles
- Best Actor:
  - Peter Sellers - Being There
- Best Actress:
  - Sally Field - Norma Rae
- Best Supporting Actor:
  - Paul Dooley - Breaking Away
- Best Supporting Actress:
  - Meryl Streep - Manhattan, The Seduction of Joe Tynan, Kramer vs. Kramer
- Best Director:
  - John Schlesinger - Yanks
- Career Achievement Award:
  - Myrna Loy
