= 34th British Academy Film Awards =

1981 film awards ceremony

- Date: 22 March 1981
- Site: Grosvenor House Hotel
- Hosted by: David Frost

Highlights
- Best Film: The Elephant Man
- Best Actor: John Hurt; The Elephant Man
- Best Actress: Judy Davis; My Brilliant Career
- Most awards: The Elephant Man (3)
- Most nominations: The Elephant Man (7)

The 34th British Academy Film Awards, more commonly known as the BAFTAs, took place on 22 March 1981 at the Grosvenor House Hotel in London, honouring the best national and foreign films of 1980. Presented by the British Academy of Film and Television Arts, accolades were handed out for the best feature-length film and documentaries of any nationality that were screened at British cinemas in 1980.

There are no records, and no explanation, showing any nominations nor winner for the BAFTA Award for Best Actor in a Supporting Role and BAFTA Award for Best Actress in a Supporting Role at this 34th film ceremony.

== Winners and nominees ==
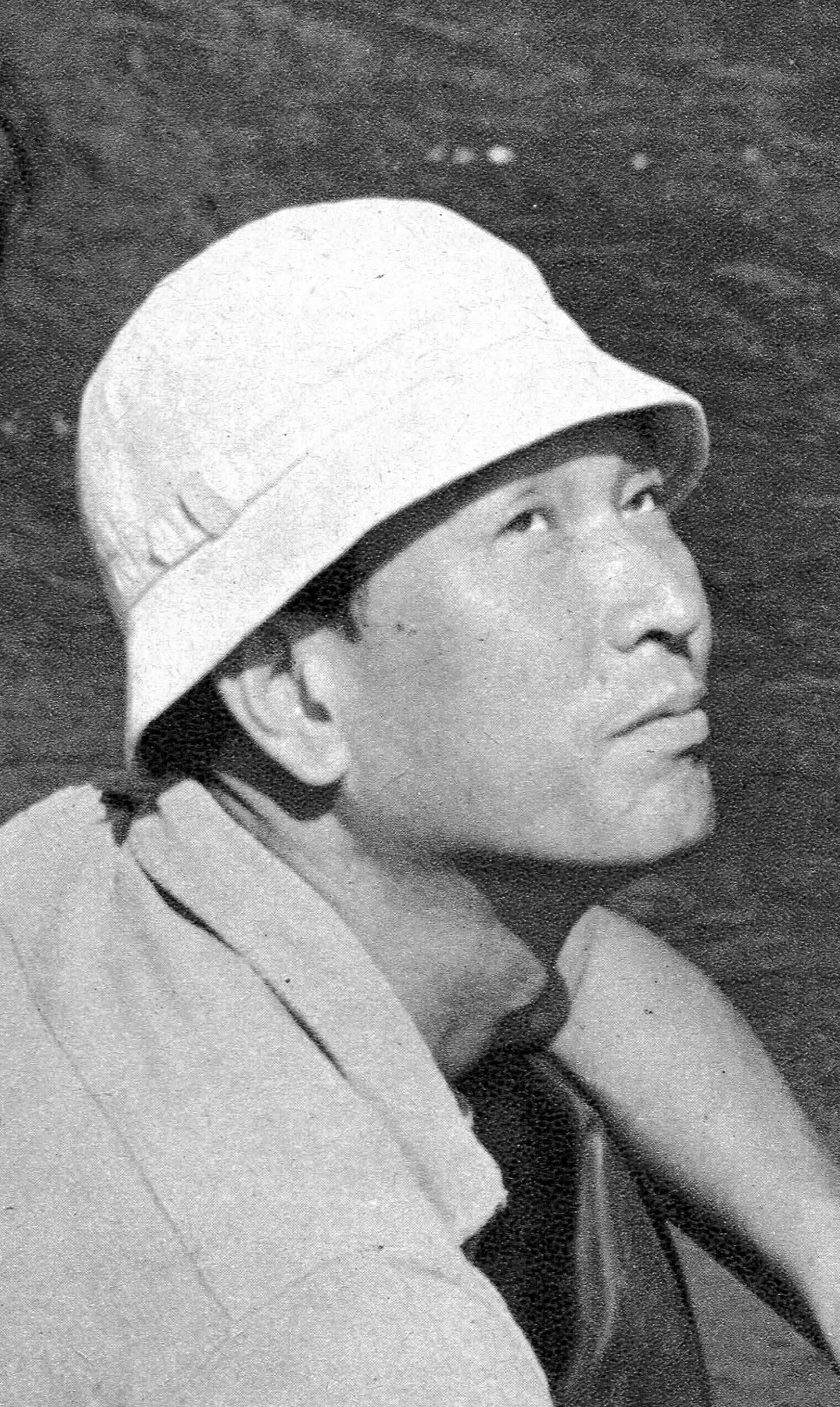
Akira Kurosawa, Best Director winner

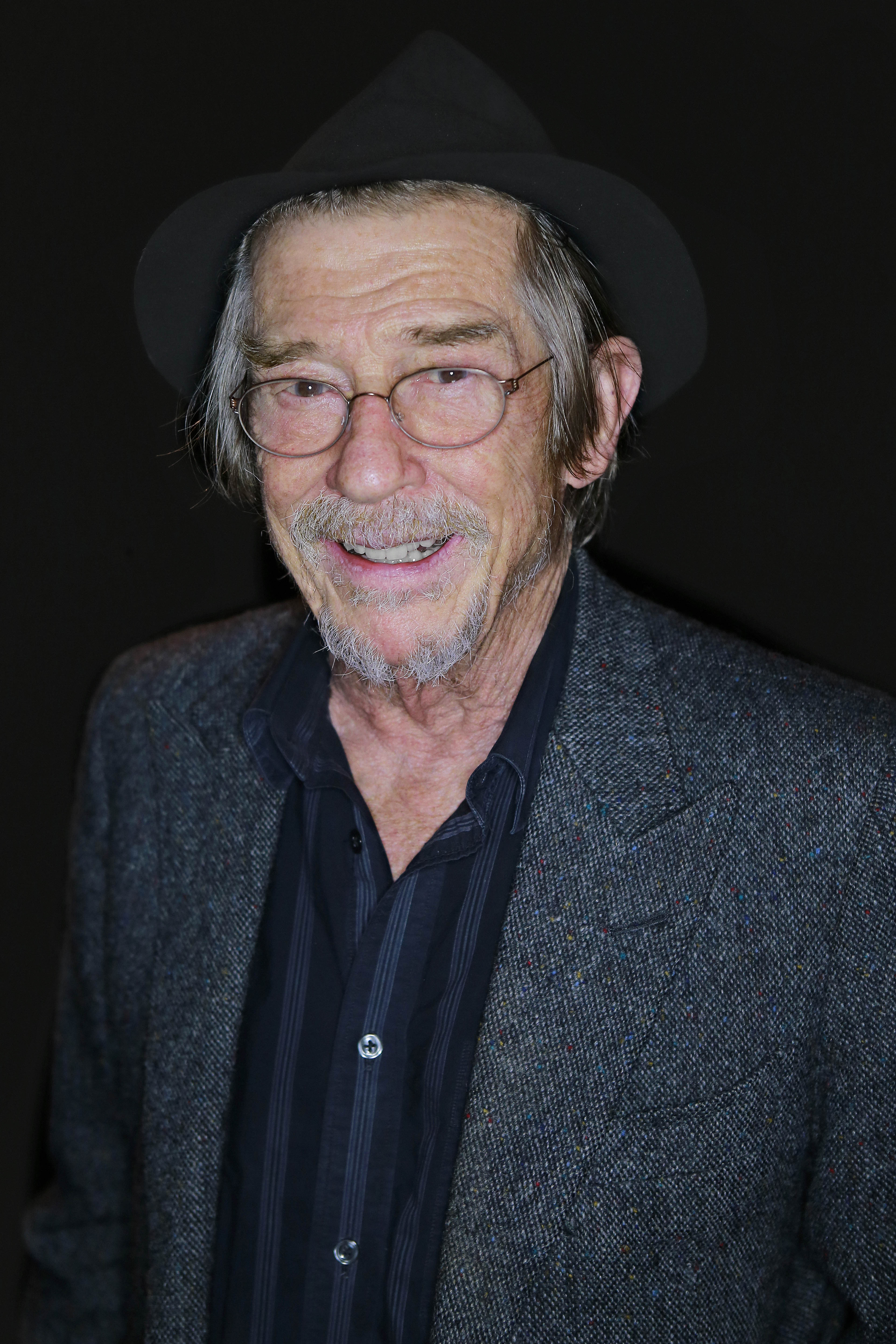
John Hurt, Best Actor winner

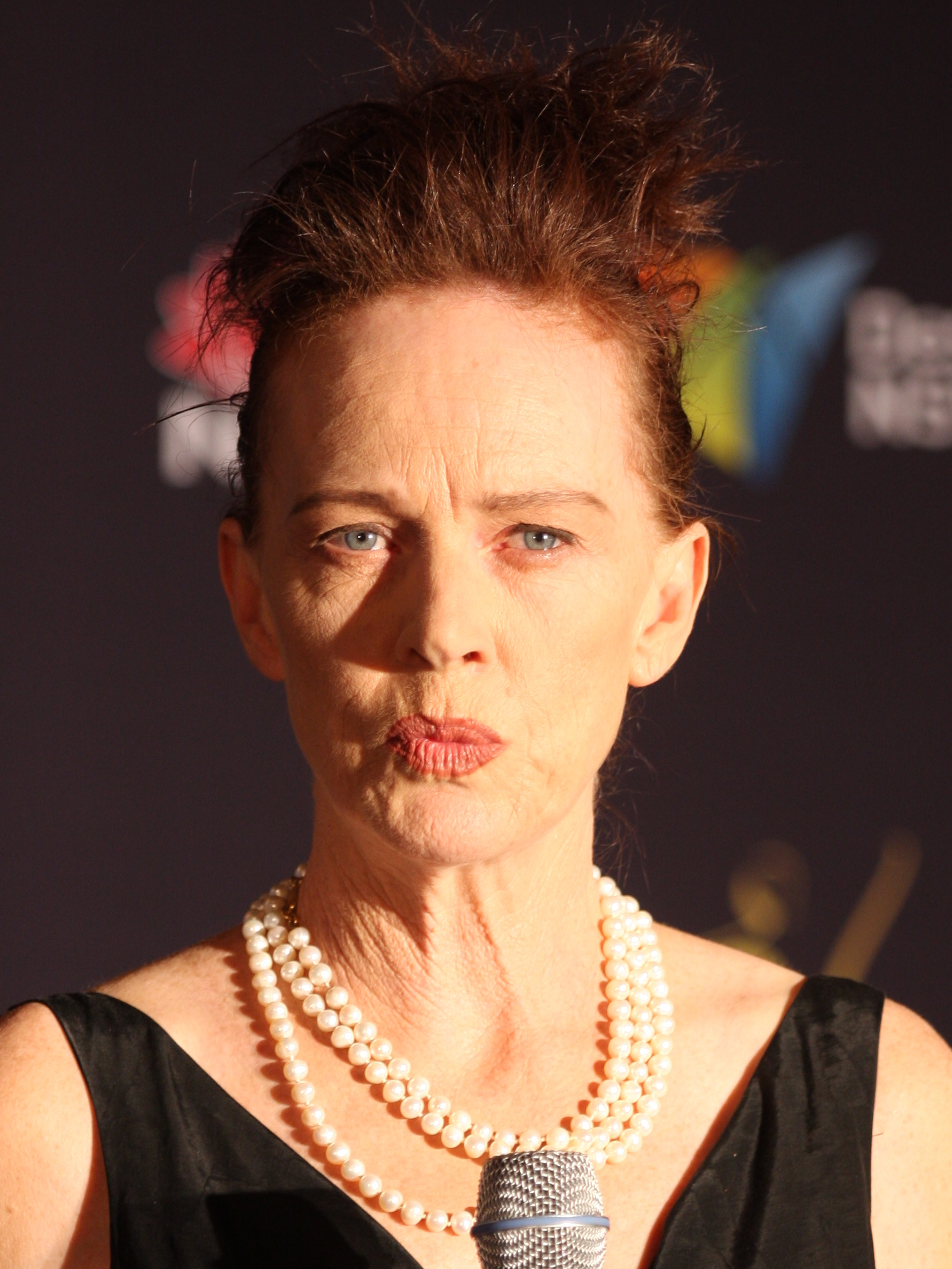
Judy Davis, Best Actress winner

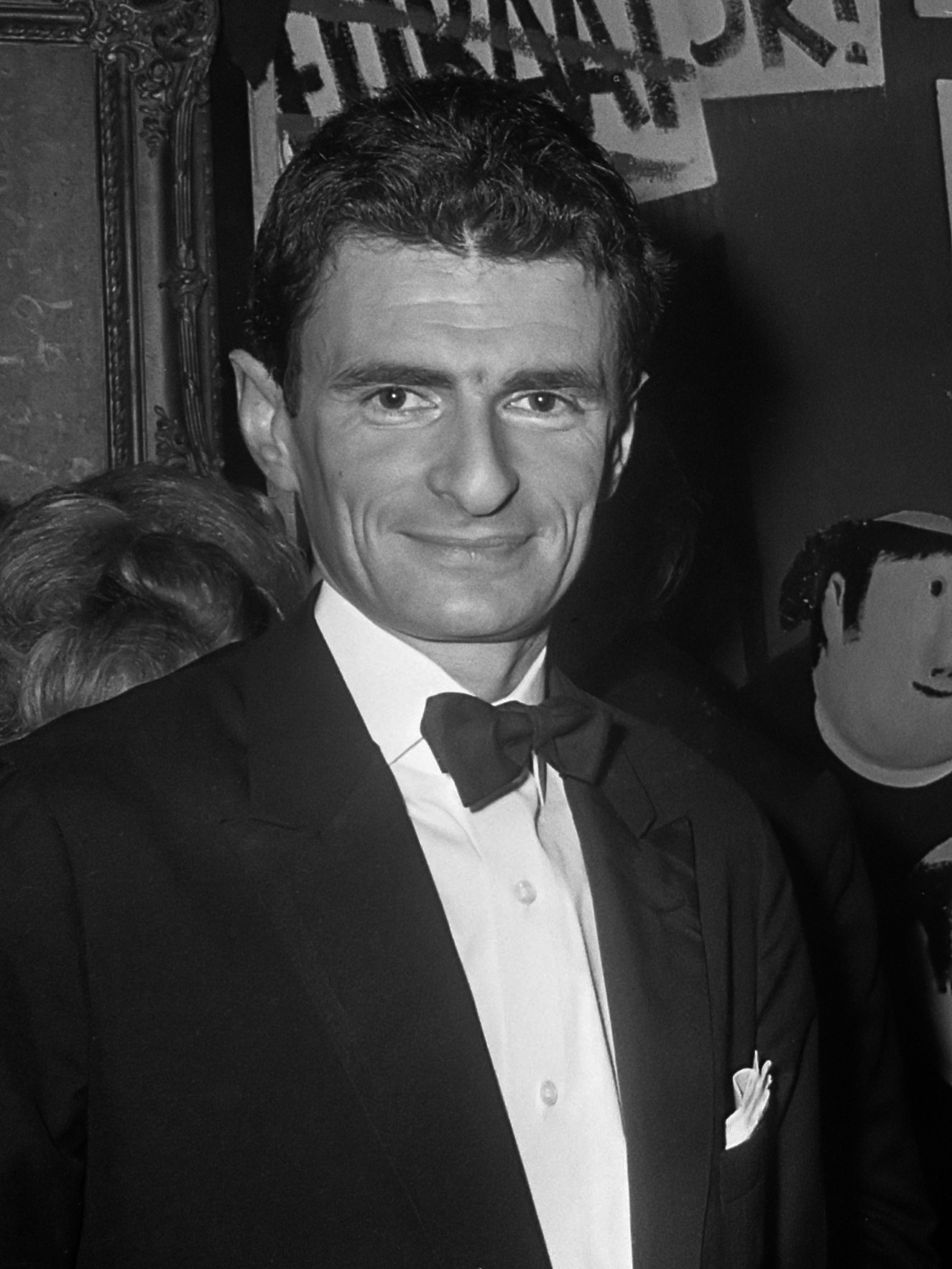
Jerzy Kosiński, Best Screenplay winner

=== BAFTA Fellowship ===
- **Abel Gance**, **Emeric Pressburger** and **Michael Powell**

=== Outstanding British Contribution to Cinema ===
- **Kevin Brownlow**

=== Awards ===
Winners are listed first and highlighted in boldface.

**Best Film**: **The Elephant Man – Jonathan Sanger**; Being There – Andrew Braunsberg; Kagemusha – Akira Kurosawa and Tomoyuki Tanaka; Kramer vs. Kramer – Stanley R. Jaffe	**Best Direction**: **Akira Kurosawa – Kagemusha**; Alan Parker – Fame; David Lynch – The Elephant Man; Robert Benton – Kramer vs. Kramer
**Best Actor in a Leading Role**: **John Hurt – The Elephant Man as Joseph Merrick**; Dustin Hoffman – Kramer vs. Kramer as Ted Kramer; Roy Scheider – All That Jazz as Joseph Gideon; Peter Sellers – Being There as Chauncey Gardiner	**Best Actress in a Leading Role**: **Judy Davis – My Brilliant Career as Sybylla Melvyn**; Bette Midler – The Rose as Mary Rose Foster; Meryl Streep – Kramer vs. Kramer as Joanna Kramer; Shirley MacLaine – Being There as Eve Rand
**Best Screenplay**: **Being There – Jerzy Kosiński**; Airplane! – Jim Abrahams, David Zucker and Jerry Zucker; The Elephant Man – Christopher De Vore, Eric Bergren and David Lynch; Kramer vs. Kramer – Robert Benton	**Best Cinematography**: **All That Jazz – Giuseppe Rotunno**; The Black Stallion – Caleb Deschanel; The Elephant Man – Freddie Francis; Kagemusha – Takao Saito and Masaharu Ueda
**Best Costume Design**: **Kagemusha – Seiichiro Momosawa**; All That Jazz – Albert Wolsky; Don Giovanni – Frantz Salieri; Flash Gordon – Danilo Donati	**Best Editing**: **All That Jazz – Alan Heim**; The Elephant Man – Anne V. Coates; Fame – Gerry Hambling; Kramer vs. Kramer – Gerald B. Greenberg
**Best Original Music**: **The Empire Strikes Back – John Williams**; Breaking Glass – Hazel O'Connor; Fame – Michael Gore; Flash Gordon – Queen and Howard Blake	**Best Production Design**: **The Elephant Man – Stuart Craig**; All That Jazz – Philip Rosenberg; The Empire Strikes Back – Norman Reynolds; Flash Gordon – Danilo Donati
**Best Sound**: **Fame – Chris Newman, Les Wiggins and Michael J. Kohut**; All That Jazz – Maurice Schell, Chris Newman and Dick Vorisek; Don Giovanni – Jean-Louis Ducarme, Jacques Maumont and Michelle Nenny; The Empire Strikes Back – Peter Sutton, Ben Burtt and Bill Varney; The Rose – Jim Webb, Chris McLaughlin, Kay Rose and Theodore Soderberg	**Most Promising Newcomer to Leading Film Roles**: **Judy Davis – My Brilliant Career as Sybylla Melvyn**; Debra Winger – Urban Cowboy as Sissy Davis; John Gordon Sinclair – Gregory's Girl as Gregory Underwood; Sônia Braga – Dona Flor and Her Two Husbands as Dona Flor
**Best Short Animation**: **The Three Inventors – Michel Ocelot**; Bio Woman – Bob Godfrey; The Cube – Kamil Pixa; Seaside Woman – Oscar Grillo	**Best Short Film**: **Sredni Vashtar – Andrew Birkin**; Box On – Lindsey Clennell; The Dollar Bottom – Roger Christian; Possessions – Andrew Bogle

== Statistics ==
Films that received multiple nominations
Nominations	Film
7	The Elephant Man
6	All That Jazz
6	Kramer vs. Kramer
4	Being There
4	Fame
4	Kagemusha
3	The Empire Strikes Back
3	Flash Gordon
2	Don Giovanni
2	My Brilliant Career
2	The Rose

Films that received multiple awards
Awards	Film
3	The Elephant Man
2	All That Jazz
2	Kagemusha
2	My Brilliant Career

== See also ==
- 53rd Academy Awards
- 6th César Awards
- 33rd Directors Guild of America Awards
- 38th Golden Globe Awards
- 1st Golden Raspberry Awards
- 7th Saturn Awards
- 33rd Writers Guild of America Awards
