= 32nd Directors Guild of America Awards =

- Date: March 15, 1980
- Location: The Beverly Hilton, Los Angeles, California
- Country: United States
- Presented by: Directors Guild of America

Highlights
- Best Director Feature Film: Kramer vs. Kramer – Robert Benton
- Website: https://www.dga.org/Awards/History/1970s/1979.aspx?value=1979

The 32nd Directors Guild of America Awards, honoring the outstanding directorial achievements in film and television in 1979, were presented on March 15, 1980 at the Beverly Hilton. The award honoring commercial directors was given out for the first time at this ceremony.

== Winners and nominees ==
=== Film ===
Feature Film

Robert Benton – Kramer vs. Kramer

- Woody Allen – Manhattan
- James Bridges – The China Syndrome
- Francis Ford Coppola – Apocalypse Now
- Peter Yates – Breaking Away

=== Television ===
Drama Series

Roger Young – Lou Grant for "Cop"

- Jackie Cooper – The White Shadow for "Pregnant Pause"
- Gene Reynolds – Lou Grant for "Bomb"
Comedy Series

Charles S. Dubin – M*A*S*H for "Period of Adjustment"

- Paul Bogart – All in the Family for "Too Good Edith"
- Noam Pitlik – Barney Miller for "The Judge"
Musical Variety

Tony Charmoli – John Denver and the Muppets: A Christmas Together

- David Deutsch – In Performance at the White House for "Segovia at the White House"
- Don Mischer – The 3rd Barry Manilow Special
Documentary

Alfred R. Kelman – The Body Human: The Magic Sense

- John Cosgrove – Angel Death
- William Peters – Bill Moyers Journal for Death of a Family
Actuality

Don Mischer – Kennedy Center Honors

- Stan Harris – The Muppets Go Hollywood
- Marty Pasetta – 51st Academy Awards
Specials/Movies for TV/Actuality

Michael Mann – The Jericho Mile

- Paul Aaron – The Miracle Worker
- David Greene – Friendly Fire
- Delbert Mann – All Quiet on the Western Front

=== Commercials ===
Commercials

Robert Lieberman

- Bob Giraldi
- R. Hagmann
- N. Lacy
- Richard Loew

=== Frank Capra Achievement Award ===
- Emmett Emerson
