= Cynthia Scheider =

American film editor

- Born: Cynthia Bebout
- Occupation: Film editor
- Spouse: Roy Scheider (m. 1962; div. 1986)
- Children: 1

Cynthia Scheider (née Bebout) is an American film editor active from the 1970s through the 1990s.

== Acting career ==
Cynthia Bebout acted in off-Broadway performances in New York. These included Love and Libel in 1960 and The Alchemist in 1964, with actors Roy Scheider, whom she married in 1962, and John Heffernan.

== Film editing career ==
Scheider later moved to film editing, becoming assistant editor for the 1971 film The French Connection, working for Gerald B. Greenberg, who won both the Academy Award for Best Film Editing and the BAFTA Award for Best Editing for his work. Scheider worked with Greenberg again on the film The Seven-Ups in 1973. In 1977, Scheider worked with William Friedkin on the film Sorcerer. In 1986, she worked on the film The Men's Club. These four films starred Roy Scheider, her husband until 1986.

Scheider had main editing credits in the film Breaking Away in 1979.

== Personal life ==
Cynthia and Roy Scheider had one child, Maximillia Connelly Lord (1963–2006), who died of leukemia.

== Selected filmography ==
- Mixing Nia (1999)
- Other Voices, Other Rooms (1995)
- *batteries not included (1987)
- The Men's Club (1986)
- The Legend of Billie Jean (1985)
- Without a Trace (1983)
- Eyewitness (1981)
- Chilly Scenes of Winter (1979)
- Breaking Away (1979)
- Sorcerer (1977)
- The Missouri Breaks (1976)
- The Happy Hooker (1975)
- The Taking of Pelham One Two Three (1974)
- Shoot It Black, Shoot It Blue (1974)
- The Seven-Ups (1973)
