= Being There =

1979 American satire film by Hal Ashby

- Theatrical release poster
- Directed by: Hal Ashby
- Screenplay by: Jerzy Kosiński (Note: Robert C. Jones worked extensively on the screenplay. He has said that both he and Kosiński initially shared a writing credit, but the Writers Guild of America overruled the decision and awarded Kosiński sole credit.)
- Based on: Being There; 1970 novel by Jerzy Kosiński
- Produced by: Andrew Braunsberg
- Starring: Peter Sellers; Shirley MacLaine; Melvyn Douglas; Jack Warden; Richard Dysart; Richard Basehart
- Cinematography: Caleb Deschanel
- Edited by: Don Zimmerman
- Music by: Johnny Mandel
- Production company: Lorimar Productions
- Distributed by: United Artists
- Release date: December 19, 1979
- Running time: 130 minutes
- Country: United States
- Language: English
- Budget: $7 million
- Box office: $30.2 million (US)

Being There is a 1979 American satirical comedy-drama film starring Peter Sellers, Shirley MacLaine, and Melvyn Douglas. Directed by Hal Ashby, it is based on the 1970 novel Being There by Jerzy Kosiński, and adapted for the screen by Kosiński and the uncredited Robert C. Jones. Jack Warden, Richard Dysart, and Richard Basehart are featured in support. The film concerns a simple-minded and heavily sheltered gardener who explores the outside world after the death of his wealthy employer and is mistaken for a brilliant political pundit.

Douglas won the Academy Award for Best Supporting Actor and Sellers was nominated for Best Actor. The screenplay won the BAFTA Award for Best Screenplay and the Writers Guild of America Award for Best Comedy Adapted from Another Medium. It was also nominated for the Golden Globe Award for Best Screenplay. In 2015, the Library of Congress selected Being There for preservation in the National Film Registry, finding it "culturally, historically, or aesthetically significant". Since release, it has developed a strong cult following and is a favorite among many filmmakers.

== Plot ==
Middle-aged, simple-minded Chance lives in a wealthy old man's townhouse in Washington, D.C., along with the man's African-American maid Louise, who is kind to him. He has spent his whole life tending the garden and never left the property. Other than gardening, his knowledge is derived entirely from television. When the old man dies, his lawyers order Chance out.

He wanders aimlessly, discovering the outside world for the first time. An African-American youth points a knife at him; Chance ineffectually tries to click him out of existence with a TV remote control. Passing by a shop, he sees himself captured by a video camera in the shop window. Entranced, he steps backward off the sidewalk and is struck by a limousine chauffeuring Eve Rand, the glamorous and much younger wife of elderly business mogul Ben Rand. When she asks his name, she mishears "Chance, the gardener" as "Chauncey Gardiner".

Eve brings Chance to their estate to be seen by Dr. Robert Allenby, who is resident there caring for Ben, who is dying from a blood disease. After checking Chauncey out, the doctor invites him to stay to keep an eye on him.

Chauncey's manners are old-fashioned and courtly, and he wears expensively tailored but outmoded 1930s clothes he took from his former employer's attic. When Ben meets him, he assumes that "Chauncey" is an upper-class, highly educated businessman fallen on hard times. Ben admires him, finding him direct, wise, and insightful.

Ben is also a confidant and advisor to the President of the United States, whom he introduces to Chauncey. In a discussion about the economy, Chance takes his cue from the words "stimulate growth" and talks about the changing seasons of the garden. The President misinterprets this as optimistic political advice and quotes "Chauncey Gardiner" in a speech.

Chance rises to national prominence, attends important events, develops a close connection with the Soviet ambassador, and appears on a talk show during which his detailed advice about what a serious gardener should do is misunderstood as his opinion on presidential policy. Louise tells other African Americans as they watch Chance on TV that he has "rice pudding between the ears" and that whiteness is all that is needed to succeed in America. The President is shown as sexually impotent with his wife when watching the show.

Though Chance has risen to the pinnacle of Washington society, the Secret Service and 16 foreign agencies are unable to find any background information on him. Meanwhile, Allenby becomes suspicious that Chance is not a wise political expert and that his mysterious identity may have a more mundane explanation. He considers telling Ben but remains silent when he realizes how happy Chance is making him in his final days.

The dying Ben encourages Eve to become close to "Chauncey". She is already attracted to him and makes a sexual advance. Chance has no interest in or knowledge of sex but mimics a kissing scene from the 1968 film The Thomas Crown Affair, which happens to be on TV. When the scene ends, Chance stops suddenly, and Eve is confused. She asks what he likes, meaning sexually; he replies "I like to watch," meaning television. She is taken aback but masturbates for his voyeuristic pleasure, not noticing he has turned back to the TV and is imitating Lilias, Yoga and You on another channel.

Chance is present at Ben's death and shows genuine sadness. Questioned by Allenby, he admits that he "loves Eve very much" and that he is just a gardener. When he leaves to inform Eve of Ben's death, Allenby says to himself, "I understand."

While the President delivers a speech at Ben's funeral, the pallbearers hold a whispered discussion over potential replacements for the President in the next presidential term and agree on "Chauncey" as successor. Oblivious, Chance wanders off through Ben's wintry estate. He straightens out a pine sapling flattened by a fallen branch, then walks across the surface of a lake without sinking. He pauses, dips his umbrella deep into the water to the right of his path, then continues on, while the President is heard quoting Ben: "Life is a state of mind."

== Cast ==
- Peter Sellers as Chance The Gardener (Chauncey Gardiner)
- Shirley MacLaine as Eve Rand
- Jack Warden as the President
- Melvyn Douglas as Ben Rand
- Richard Dysart as Dr. Robert Allenby
- Richard Basehart as Soviet Ambassador Vladimir Skrapinov
- Than Wyenn as Ambassador Gaufridi
- David Clennon as Thomas Franklin
- Fran Brill as Sally Hayes
- Ruth Attaway as Louise
- Denise DuBarry as Johanna
- Richard Venture as Wilson
- Sam Weisman as Colson
- Alice Hirson as the First Lady
- Arthur Rosenberg as Morton Hull
- Jerome Hellman as Gary Burns
- James Noble as Kaufman
- John Harkins as Courtney
- Elya Baskin as Karpatov
- Richard McKenzie as Ron Steigler

== Production ==
=== Casting ===
Burt Lancaster was Ashby's first choice for the role of Ben Rand. Laurence Olivier was also considered for the role, but turned it down because of the masturbation scene.

=== Filming ===
Principal filming occurred at the Biltmore Estate, the largest private home in the United States, located in Asheville, North Carolina. According to MacLaine, "(Peter) believed he was Chauncey. He never had lunch with me ... He was Chauncey Gardiner the whole shoot, but believing he was having a love affair with me." The original ending as written in the script was filmed; it shows Eve finding Chance by the lake, they declare they have found each other, and both walk back together. However, Ashby was unhappy with this ending so he had a platform submerged in the lake for Sellers to walk on, creating the film's enigmatic final scene.

The making of the film is portrayed in The Life and Death of Peter Sellers, a biographical film of Sellers's life.

== Music ==
Incidental music is used very sparingly. What little original music is used was composed by Johnny Mandel, and primarily features two recurrent piano themes based on "Gnossiennes" No. 4 and No. 5 by Erik Satie. The other major pieces of music used are the Eumir Deodato jazz/funk arrangement of the opening fanfare from Also Sprach Zarathustra and "Basketball Jones" by Cheech and Chong. These pieces respectively accompany the title credits and Chance's first arrival to the Biltmore Estate. Mandel was also assisted by his cousin and fellow composer Miles Goodman with the orchestration of the film.

== Reception ==
The film opened to positive reviews and gave Sellers a hit after a run of failed films outside of the Pink Panther series. Film critic Roger Ebert of The Chicago Sun-Times awarded a grade of four out of four stars in his original print review, writing how Being There was "one of the most confoundingly provocative movies of the year" and contained "wonderful comic moments". Gene Siskel also gave the film a perfect grade of four stars, calling it "one of those rare films, a work of such electric comedy that you are more likely to watch it in amazement than to break down and laugh". Janet Maslin of The New York Times called it "a stately, beautifully acted satire with a premise that's funny but fragile". Variety called it "an unusually fine film" that "represents Peter Sellers's most smashing work since the mid-1960s". Kevin Thomas of the Los Angeles Times called it "a gentle, exquisitely funny film", adding that "Sellers hasn't been so terrific—or had such terrific material—in years."

Vincent Misiano reviewed Being There in Ares Magazine and commented that "the film's humor never flags and yet its delicately bitter irony is never far away. It satirizes politics and politicians, business and businessmen, and, finally, all the rest of us and what we imagine we see when we look at one another."

In 2006, Roger Ebert mentioned the reaction of his students to the final scene (which is unique to the film, not appearing in the book), stating that they once suggested that Chance may be walking on a submerged pier. But, Ebert writes, "The movie presents us with an image, and while you may discuss the meaning of the image, it is not permitted to devise explanations for it. Since Ashby does not show a pier, there is no pier—a movie is exactly what it shows us, and nothing more."

The ending credits roll over the "Rafael outtake", in which Sellers repeatedly gets his lines wrong. Sellers was displeased that the outtake ran because he believed that it detracted from Chauncey's mystique. He also believed that it prevented him from winning the Oscar.

As of 2023 and beyond, the film holds a score of 95% on Rotten Tomatoes based on 62 reviews, with an average rating of 8.60/10. The critical consensus reads, "Smart, sophisticated, and refreshingly subtle, Being There soars behind sensitive direction from Hal Ashby and a stellar Peter Sellers performance." In 2003, The New York Times placed the film on its Best 1000 Movies Ever list. In 2006, Writers Guild of America West ranked its screenplay 81st in WGA’s list of 101 Greatest Screenplays.

== Awards and nominations ==
Award	Category	Nominee(s)	Result
Academy Awards	Best Actor	Peter Sellers	Nominated
Academy Awards	Best Supporting Actor	Melvyn Douglas	Won
British Academy Film Awards	Best Film	Andrew Braunsberg	Nominated
British Academy Film Awards	Best Actor in a Leading Role	Peter Sellers	Nominated
British Academy Film Awards	Best Actress in a Leading Role	Shirley MacLaine	Nominated
British Academy Film Awards	Best Screenplay	Jerzy Kosiński	Won
Cannes Film Festival	Palme d'Or	Hal Ashby	Nominated
Fotogramas de Plata Awards	Best Foreign Performer	Peter Sellers	Won
Golden Globe Awards	Best Motion Picture – Musical or Comedy		Nominated
Golden Globe Awards	Best Actor in a Motion Picture – Musical or Comedy	Peter Sellers	Won
Golden Globe Awards	Best Actress in a Motion Picture – Musical or Comedy	Shirley MacLaine	Nominated
Golden Globe Awards	Best Supporting Actor – Motion Picture	Melvyn Douglas	Won (Note: Tied with Robert Duvall for Apocalypse Now.)
Golden Globe Awards	Best Director – Motion Picture	Hal Ashby	Nominated
Golden Globe Awards	Best Screenplay – Motion Picture	Jerzy Kosinski	Nominated
Japan Academy Film Prize	Outstanding Foreign Language Film	Hal Ashby	Nominated
London Critics Circle Film Awards	Special Achievement Award	Peter Sellers	Won
Los Angeles Film Critics Association Awards	Best Supporting Actor	Melvyn Douglas (also for The Seduction of Joe Tynan)	Won
National Board of Review Awards	Top Ten Films		Won
National Board of Review Awards	Best Actor	Peter Sellers	Won
National Film Preservation Board	National Film Registry		Inducted
National Society of Film Critics Awards	Best Actor	Peter Sellers	Nominated
National Society of Film Critics Awards	Best Supporting Actor	Melvyn Douglas	Nominated
National Society of Film Critics Awards	Best Screenplay	Jerzy Kosinski and Robert C. Jones	Nominated
National Society of Film Critics Awards	Best Cinematography	Caleb Deschanel (also for The Black Stallion)	Won
New York Film Critics Circle Awards	Best Actor	Peter Sellers	Nominated
New York Film Critics Circle Awards	Best Supporting Actor	Melvyn Douglas	Won
New York Film Critics Circle Awards	Best Screenplay	Jerzy Kosinski	Nominated
Writers Guild of America Awards	Best Comedy – Adapted from Another Medium	Jerzy Kosinski	Won

The film is recognized by American Film Institute in:

- 2000: AFI's 100 Years...100 Laughs – #26

== Home media ==
A 30th Anniversary Edition was released on DVD and Blu-ray in February 2009. The Criterion Collection issued the film on DVD and Blu-ray in March 2017.

== See also ==
- The Career of Nicodemus Dyzma: Being There is said to bear a strong resemblance to this 1932 Polish novel, and the film's originality became a subject of controversy in 1982. Monika Adamczyk-Garbowska wrote "most Polish critics immediately recognized his book as a version of Kariera Nikodema Dyzmy by Tadeusz Dolega-Mostowicz.
- Dasein – Term in Martin Heidegger's philosophy
- Politics in fiction
- Social effects of television
