= 32nd Writers Guild of America Awards =

32nd WGA Awards
- Date: 1980
- Organized by: Writers Guild of America, East and the Writers Guild of America, West

The 32nd Writers Guild of America Awards honored the best television, and film writers of 1979. Winners were announced in 1980.

== Winners and nominees ==
=== Film ===
Winners are listed first highlighted in boldface.

**Best Drama Written Directly for the Screen**: **The China Syndrome, Written by Mike Gray, T.S. Cook and James Bridges**; Apocalypse Now, Written by John Milius and Francis Ford Coppola	**Best Comedy Written Directly for the Screen**: **Breaking Away, Written by Steve Tesich**; 10, Written by Blake Edwards; Manhattan, Written by Woody Allen and Marshall Brickman
**Best Drama Adapted from Another Medium**: **Kramer vs. Kramer, Screenplay by Robert Benton; Based on the novel by Avery Corman**; Norma Rae, Screenplay by Irving Ravetch and Harriet Frank Jr.	**Best Comedy Adapted from Another Medium**: **Being There, Screenplay by Jerzy Kosiński; Based on his novel**; A Little Romance, Screenplay by Allan Burns; Based on the novel by Claude Klotz; Starting Over, Screenplay by James L. Brooks; Based on the novel by Dan Wakefield

=== Television ===
**Episodic Comedy**: **"Are You Now, Margaret" – M*A*S*H (CBS) – Thad Mumford and Dan Wilcox**; **"The reluctant Fighter" – Taxi (ABC) – Ken Estin**; "The Indian" – Barney Miller (ABC) – Reinhold Weege, Judith Anne Nielsen and Richard Beban; "The Young and the Restless" – M*A*S*H (CBS) – Mitch Markowitz; "Period of Adjustment" – M*A*S*H (CBS) – Jim Mulligan and John Rappaport; "Good-Bye Radar: Part 1 & 2" – M*A*S*H (CBS) – Ken Levine and David Isaacs; "Honor Thy Father" – Taxi (ABC) – Glen Charles and Les Charles; "Elaine's Secret Admirer" – Taxi (ABC) – Barry Kemp	**Episodic Drama**: **"Vet" – Lou Grant (CBS) – Leon Tokatyan**; "Only the Pretty Girls Die: Part 1 & 2" – Eischied (NBC) – Mark Rodgers; "Exposé" – Lou Grant (CBS) – David Lloyd; "Slammer" – Lou Grant (CBS) – Johnny Dawkins; "Home" – Lou Grant (CBS) – Gary David Goldberg; "Love Is the Word" – The Rockford Files (NBC) – David Chase; "The Burden" – The Waltons (CBS) – Ernie Wallengren
**Daytime Serials**: **Guiding Light (CBS) – Jean Rouverol, Phyllis White, Bridget Dobson, Robert Soderberg, Robert White, Patti Dizenzo, Jerome Dobson and Charles Dizenzo**; Days of Our Lives (NBC) – Ann Marcus, Joyce Perry, Ray Goldstone, Laura Olsher, Rocci Chatfield and Michael Robert David; Ryan's Hope (ABC) – Claire Labine, Paul Avila Mayer, Mary Munisteri, Jeffrey Lane and Judith Pinsker	**Children's Script - Episodic & Specials**: **"New York City Too Far From Tampa Blues" – NBC Special Treat (NBC) – Edward Pomerantz**; "Make Believe Marriage" – ABC Afterschool Special (ABC) – Jeffrey Kindley; "Going Out" – Friends (ABC) – Liz Coe; "Show #4" – Hot Hero Sandwich (NBC) – David R. Axelrod, Joseph A. Bailey, Andy Beckerman, Richard Camp, Sherry Coben, Bruce Hart, Carole Hart and Marianne Meyer
**Multi-Part Long Form Series and/or Any Production of More Than Two Parts**: **Backstairs at the White House (NBC) – Gwen Bagni and Paul Dubov**

=== Special awards ===
Laurel Award for Screenwriting Achievement
**Billy Wilder, and I.A.L. Diamond**
Laurel Award for TV Writing Achievement
**Howard Rodman**
Valentine Davies Award
**David W. Rintels**
Morgan Cox Award
**Fay Kanin**
