= C. Timothy O'Meara =

American film editor

- Born: Carroll Timothy O'Meara; April 22, 1943; Sherman Oaks, California, U.S.
- Died: May 16, 2007 (aged 64); Chatsworth, California, U.S.
- Occupation: Film editor

Carroll Timothy O'Meara (April 22, 1943 – May 16, 2007) was an American film editor. He was nominated for an Academy Award in the category Best Film Editing for the film The Rose.

In addition to his Academy Award nomination, he won a Primetime Emmy Award in the category Outstanding Picture Editing for a Limited or Anthology Series or Movie for his work on the television program The Thorn Birds.

O'Meara died on May 16, 2007 at his home in Chatsworth, California, at the age of 64. He was buried at Forest Lawn Memorial Park in Hollywood Hills, California.

== Selected filmography ==
- The Rose (1979; co-nominated with Robert L. Wolfe)
