= Crystal Lee Sutton =

American labor activist (1940-2009)

- Born: December 31, 1940; Roanoke Rapids, North Carolina, United States
- Died: September 11, 2009 (aged 68); Burlington, North Carolina
- Other names: Crystal Lee Pulley; Crystal Lee Jordan
- Occupation: Union organizer

Crystal Lee Sutton (née Pulley; December 31, 1940 – September 11, 2009) was an American union organizer and advocate who gained fame in 1979 when the film Norma Rae was released, based on events related to her being fired from her job at the J.P. Stevens plant in Roanoke Rapids, North Carolina, on May 30, 1973, for "insubordination" after she copied an anti-union letter posted on the company bulletin board.

== Union activism and recognition ==
Sutton was one of the union activists during the J.P. Stevens controversy—one of "the ugliest episodes in labor history in the United States which took place from about 1963 to 1980" during which Stevens "repeatedly harassed or fired union activists" and the union "countered with a boycott of Stevens products" and a "campaign to isolate the company by pressuring companies that dealt with Stevens or had Stevens officers on their boards." In 1973 Sutton saw a union poster hanging in one of the seven mills in Roanoke Rapids, North Carolina owned by J.P. Stevens & Company mills where three generations of her family had worked—living in a neighborhood where the Company "owned every shotgun house" in Sutton's neighborhood. She had been "thinking about the paltry wages, the bone-tiring work and the stingy benefits that she and her parents had suffered. She wanted something better for her children." In 1973 Sutton was fired after trying to unionize employees. Shortly after, by August 28, 1974, Amalgamated Clothing and Textile Workers Union (ACTWU) began to represent workers at the plant.

The Textile Workers Union of America sent union organizer Eli Zivkovich to unionize J.P. Stevens & Company's Roanoke Rapids mills employees and worked with Sutton. He said "in 20 years as an organizer he had never known anyone who matched Sutton's zeal." "Management and others treated me as if I had leprosy," she stated. Sutton earned $2.65 per hour folding towels (equivalent to $19.22 in 2025).

She received threats and was finally fired from her job. But before she left, she took one final stand, portrayed in Norma Rae. "I took a piece of cardboard and wrote the word UNION on it in big letters, got up on my work table, and slowly turned it around. The workers started cutting their machines off and giving me the victory sign. All of a sudden the plant was very quiet…" Sutton was physically removed from the plant by police, but she achieved her goal. On August 28, 1974, the 3,133 workers at the Roanoke Rapids plant voted to allow The Amalgamated Clothing and Textile Workers Union (ACTWU) to represent them by a slim 237 vote margin. However, because of the intractability of J.P. Stevens, workers at the plant continued without a contract until 1980. Thanks to a coalition of black and white women employees of the mill, Sutton's national speaking tour, and local organizing on behalf of workers among religious groups, J.P. Stevens and ACTWU agreed to a settlement in 1980. Sutton became a paid organizer for the ACTWU and went on a national speaking tour as "the real Norma Rae." Sutton was the 13th recipient of the Pacem in Terris Peace and Freedom Award in 1980. The honor was named after a 1963 encyclical letter, Pacem in terris (Peace on Earth), by Pope John XXIII, that calls upon all people of good will to secure peace among all nations.

Sutton was critical of the ACTWU for not supporting her after her arrest, relaying that union leaders "...acted like they were ashamed to have ever had anything to do with Crystal Lee." She reported that, when she was reinstated at J.P. Stevens, she was snubbed by the union organizer. "I mean, I walked into that mill that day and the organizer said he didn't even know who I was. There was nobody from the regional office. No press, nothing." Two days later she took her accumulated sick days to demonstrate her value to the union. Ultimately her relationship with the Union was mended and she began working directly for the ACTWU.

== Norma Rae ==
The 1979 film Norma Rae, starring Sally Field, is based on Sutton's early union work. The movie is based on the 1975 book about her by New York Times reporter Henry "Hank" Leifermann Crystal Lee: A Woman of Inheritance. Her papers and memorabilia are located at Alamance Community College in North Carolina, where she took classes in nursing in 1988.

== Personal life ==
Sutton was born Crystal Lee Pulley in Roanoke Rapids on December 31, 1940. She married at 19, gave birth to her first child at 20, and was widowed at 21. She married Larry Jordan Jr. and had her third child at 25. Following the events that made her famous and before the release of Norma Rae, she and Jordan were divorced. She married Lewis Sutton Jr. about 1977. Obituaries state they were married 32 years.

== Death ==
Crystal Lee Sutton died of inoperable brain cancer at Hospice Home in Burlington, North Carolina on September 11, 2009.

== See also ==
- Erin Brockovich
