= Kramer vs. Kramer =

1979 film by Robert Benton

- Theatrical release poster
- Directed by: Robert Benton
- Screenplay by: Robert Benton
- Based on: Kramer Versus Kramer; 1977 novel by Avery Corman
- Produced by: Richard Fischoff; Stanley R. Jaffe
- Starring: Dustin Hoffman; Meryl Streep; Jane Alexander; Justin Henry
- Cinematography: Néstor Almendros
- Edited by: Gerald B. Greenberg
- Music by: Paul Gemignani; Herb Harris; John Kander; Erma E. Levin; Roy B. Yokelson; Antonio Vivaldi
- Production company: Stanley Jaffe Productions
- Distributed by: Columbia Pictures
- Release date: December 19, 1979
- Running time: 105 minutes
- Country: United States
- Language: English
- Budget: $8 million
- Box office: $173 million

Kramer vs. Kramer is a 1979 American legal drama film written and directed by Robert Benton, based on Avery Corman's 1977 novel. The film stars Dustin Hoffman, Meryl Streep, Jane Alexander, and Justin Henry (in his film debut). It tells the story of a couple's divorce, its effect on their young son, and the subsequent evolution of their relationship and views on parenting. Kramer vs. Kramer explores the psychology and fallout of divorce, and touches on emerging and prevailing social issues such as gender roles, fathers' rights, work-life balance, and single parents.

Kramer vs. Kramer was theatrically released December 19, 1979, by Columbia Pictures. The film emerged as a major commercial success at the box office, grossing more than $173 million on an $8 million budget, becoming the highest-grossing film of 1979 in the United States and Canada. It received widespread critical acclaim upon release, with high praise for its direction, story, screenplay and performances of the cast, with major praise directed towards Hoffman and Streep's performances.

Kramer vs. Kramer received a leading nine nominations at the 52nd Academy Awards, including Best Supporting Actor (for Henry) and Best Supporting Actress (for Alexander and Streep), and won a leading five awards – Best Picture, Best Director (for Benton), Best Actor (for Hoffman), Best Supporting Actress (for Streep) and Best Adapted Screenplay. At the 37th Golden Globe Awards, the film received a leading eight nominations, including Best Director (for Benton), Best Supporting Actor – Motion Picture (for Henry) and Best Supporting Actress – Motion Picture (for Alexander), and won a leading four awards, including Best Motion Picture – Drama, Best Actor in a Motion Picture – Drama (for Hoffman) and Best Supporting Actress – Motion Picture (for Streep). It also received six nominations at the 34th British Academy Film Awards, including Best Film, Best Direction (for Benton), Best Actor in a Leading Role (for Hoffman) and Best Actress in a Leading Role (for Streep).

== Plot ==
When Ted Kramer, a workaholic advertising executive in New York City, shares news of landing an important account and job promotion with his wife Joanna, she announces she is leaving him after eight years of marriage. She leaves without Billy, the couple's five-year-old son, because she feels she is unfit to be a mother.

Ted and Billy struggle to adapt to their new situation. Ted takes Billy to school, a task Joanna always performed, then confides the news to Jim O'Connor, his boss and friend at work. Jim insists Ted's situation cannot interfere with his new responsibility as lead on the Mid-Atlantic Airlines account. Billy misses his mother and Ted has to do chores usually done by Joanna. They settle into a routine, but Ted's work suffers. One night, Billy and Ted argue when the former refuses to eat Salisbury steak and has ice cream instead. They later reconcile. When Billy worries his mother's departure is his fault, Ted assures him Joanna left because she was not happy in the marriage. Ted develops a friendship with divorced neighbor Margaret Phelps, with whom Joanna was a confidante. When Billy falls off a jungle gym, Ted rushes him to hospital and stays by his side as he receives stitches.

After 15 months, Joanna invites Ted to meet her at a restaurant, where she reveals she is happier after working in California, seeing a therapist, and wants Billy to live with her in California. It escalates into an emotional confrontation, culminating in Ted smashing a wine glass against the wall in frustration.

Ted consults with divorce attorney John Shaunessy, who cautions that the court usually awards custody to the mother when the child is young. Ted's agency terminates him when the Mid-Atlantic Airlines executives become displeased with his work. Knowing unemployment will harm his chance at winning child custody, Ted tries to land an industry job during the holiday season and convinces an agency to offer him a lower-salaried position for which he is overqualified.

During the custody hearing Joanna testifies that Ted never abused her or was unfaithful, but she lost her self-esteem as a stay-at-home mother. She insists she has since "become a whole person again" and believes her son needs her more than he does his father. Ted states he has proven he can parent as well as Joanna and insists that taking Billy away could cause "irreparable" harm. The legal battle becomes contentious when the attorneys resort to character assassinations. Shaunessy forces Joanna to admit she was part of the marriage's failure. Ted also admits he made mistakes as a father and husband, but his job loss and Billy's accident are used to discredit him. Ted expresses resentment at Joanna for her attorney's aggressive tactics. Margaret implores Joanna to recognize that Ted has become a great father.

Joanna is awarded custody. Ted decides not to appeal in order to spare Billy the burden of testifying in court. Billy is upset, though Ted explains they will still see each other. When Joanna arrives to pick up Billy, she sees Ted in the lobby alone and tearfully reveals that she is relinquishing custody, not wanting to take Billy away from his home. Joanna asks to see Billy, and Ted allows her to see their son alone and decides to wait in the lobby.

== Cast ==
- Dustin Hoffman as Ted Kramer
- Meryl Streep as Joanna (Stern) Kramer
- Justin Henry as Billy Kramer
- Jane Alexander as Margaret Phelps
- Petra King as Petie Phelps
- Melissa Morell as Kim Phelps
- Howard Duff as John Shaunessy
- George Coe as Jim O'Connor
- JoBeth Williams as Phyllis Bernard
- Howland Chamberlain as Judge Atkins
- Dan Tyra as Court Clerk

== Production ==
Producer Stanley R. Jaffe and writer and director Robert Benton read Avery Corman's source novel, and were so moved by the story that they bought the rights to make it into a film. Dustin Hoffman was the only actor they envisioned in the lead role of Ted Kramer.

Hoffman, going through a divorce at the time, initially turned down the role. He has since stated that, at that time, he had wanted to quit film acting and return to the stage, due to his depression and distaste for Hollywood. While Jaffe and Benton were courting Hoffman, James Caan was offered the role, but turned it down, as he was concerned the film would be a flop. Al Pacino was offered the role, but felt it was not for him. Jon Voight also turned down the role. Hoffman met with Jaffe and Benton at a London hotel during the making of Agatha (1979), and was convinced to accept the role. Hoffman has credited Benton and this film for rejuvenating his love of film acting, and inspiring the emotional level of many scenes. Hoffman was reminded of his love for children and "got closer to being a father by playing a father".

Benton and Jaffe selected Justin Henry to play Billy. Hoffman worked extensively with Henry, then 7 years old, in each scene to put him at ease. Benton encouraged Henry to improvise to make his performance more natural. The ice cream scene in which Billy defies Ted by skipping dinner and eating ice cream was all improvised by Hoffman and Henry. Hoffman contributed many personal moments and dialogue; Benton offered shared screenplay credit but Hoffman declined.

Kate Jackson was offered the role of Joanna Kramer, but had to turn it down, as producer Aaron Spelling was unable to rearrange the shooting schedule of the TV series Charlie's Angels, in which Jackson was starring. The part was offered to Faye Dunaway, Jane Fonda and Ali MacGraw before Meryl Streep was cast.

Streep was initially cast as Phyllis (the role eventually taken by JoBeth Williams), but she was able to force her way into auditioning for Joanna in front of Hoffman, Benton, and Jaffe. She found the character in the novel and script unsympathetic ("an ogre, a princess, an ass", as she called her), and approached Joanna from a more sympathetic point of view. Hoffman believed the death of Streep's fiancé, John Cazale, only months earlier, gave her an emotional edge and "still-fresh pain" to draw on for the performance. Streep was contracted to work only 12 days on the film.

Gail Strickland was first cast as Ted's neighbor Margaret, but departed after a week of filming (due to "artistic differences", according to Columbia Pictures), and was replaced by Jane Alexander. Michael Schulman claims Strickland was so rattled by the intensity of filming with Hoffman that she developed a stammer, making her lines difficult to follow. Strickland disputes this account, saying she could not quickly memorize improvised lines Hoffman gave her, which agitated him, and she was fired two days later.

Cinematographer Néstor Almendros, a collaborator on numerous François Truffaut films, had been hired with the expectation that Truffaut would direct. Truffaut turned it down, as he was busy with his own projects, and suggested screenwriter Robert Benton direct the film.

JoBeth Williams worried about disrobing in the scene with a young Justin Henry. "I was afraid my nudity would traumatize the little boy", she said, but was relieved that he seemed unbothered.

The production budget was less than $8 million dollars.

== Controversy ==
Hoffman has been widely reported to have harassed Streep during the making of the film, and the two had a contentious working relationship. In a 1979 Time magazine interview, Streep claimed that Hoffman groped her breast on their first meeting, although a representative for Streep said the article was not "an accurate rendering of that meeting". When Streep advocated portraying Joanna as more sympathetic and vulnerable than she was written, she received pushback from Hoffman. According to one unauthorized biography of Streep, such was Hoffman's commitment to method acting that he would hurl insults and obscenities at Streep and taunt her with the name of her recently deceased fiancé, John Cazale, saying it was designed to draw a better performance from her.

Hoffman and Streep in the restaurant scene at J.G. Melon.

In a tense restaurant scene, shot at J.G. Melon, he famously shattered his wine glass against the wall without telling her beforehand (only informing the cameraman beforehand to keep shooting, so the moment would be captured on film and her reaction would be genuine), sending glass shards into her hair; she confronted him immediately afterward for frightening her so badly. She said: "Next time you do that, I'd appreciate you letting me know." In 2018, Streep claimed that Hoffman slapped her hard without warning while filming a scene. "This was my first film, and it was my first take in my first film, and he just slapped me. And you see it in the film. It was overstepping."

== Reception ==
Kramer vs. Kramer received widespread critical acclaim upon release, with high praise for its direction, story, screenplay and performances of the cast, with major praise directed towards Hoffman and Streep's performances.

On the review aggregator website Rotten Tomatoes, 90% of 101 critics' reviews are positive, with an average rating of 8.20/10. The website's consensus reads: "The divorce subject isn't as shocking, but Kramer vs. Kramer is still a thoughtful, well-acted drama that resists the urge to take sides or give easy answers." It has a score of 77 out of 100 on Metacritic, based on nine reviews, indicating "generally favorable" reviews.

Roger Ebert of the Chicago Sun-Times gave the film four stars, giving praise to Benton's screenplay. "His characters aren't just talking to each other, they're revealing things about themselves and can sometimes be seen in the act of learning about their own motives. That's what makes Kramer vs. Kramer such a touching film: We get the feeling at times that personalities are changing and decisions are being made even as we watch them."

Vincent Canby of The New York Times called it a "fine, witty, moving, most intelligent adaptation of Avery Corman's best-selling novel", with Streep giving "one of the major performances of the year", and Hoffman "splendid in one of the two or three best roles of his career."

Gene Siskel of the Chicago Tribune gave the film four stars out of four, and wrote, "Kramer vs. Kramer never loses its low-key, realistic touch. You will sit at the end of the film wondering why we don't see more pictures like this. After all, its story is not all that unusual." He thought that Hoffman gave "one of his most memorable performances", and "should win the Academy Award next April".

Variety wrote, "Stories on screen about men leaving women, and women leaving men have been abundant as of late, but hardly any has grappled with the issue in such a forthright and honest fashion as Kramer ... While a nasty court battle ensues, the human focus is never abandoned, and it's to the credit of not only Benton and Jaffe, but especially Hoffman and Streep, that both leading characters emerge as credible and sympathetic."

Charles Champlin of the Los Angeles Times declared it "as nearly perfect a film as can be", and "a motion picture with an emotional wallop second to none this year."

Gary Arnold of The Washington Post called the film "a triumph of partisan pathos, a celebration of father-son bonding that astutely succeeds where tearjerkers like The Champ (1979) so mawkishly failed".

Stanley Kauffmann of The New Republic wrote, "All the people go through expected difficulties the way that runners take the hurdles in a track event: no surprise in it, it's just a question of how they do it. But the actors make it more."

Shortly after the film's release, The New York Times and Time magazine published separate articles in which members of the bar and bench criticized the court battle scenes as "legally out of date". According to the legal experts interviewed for the articles, a modern judge would have made use of psychological reports, and also would have considered the wishes of the child. Another criticism was that the option of joint custody was never explored.

In 2003, The New York Times placed the film on its Best 1000 Movies Ever list.

=== Box office ===
Kramer vs. Kramer grossed $5,559,722 in its opening week from 534 theaters. It went on to gross $106.3 million in the United States and Canada. In its first 13 weeks overseas, it grossed more than $67 million. It went on to become Columbia's highest-grossing film overseas, with theatrical rentals of $57 million, until surpassed in 1990 by Look Who's Talking (released by Columbia TriStar internationally).

=== Awards and nominations ===
Award	Category	Nominee(s)	Result	Ref.
Academy Awards	Best Picture	Stanley R. Jaffe	Won	
Academy Awards	Best Director	Robert Benton	Won	
Academy Awards	Best Actor	Dustin Hoffman	Won	
Academy Awards	Best Supporting Actor	Justin Henry	Nominated	
Academy Awards	Best Supporting Actress	Jane Alexander	Nominated	
Academy Awards	Best Supporting Actress	Meryl Streep	Won	
Academy Awards	Best Screenplay – Based on Material from Another Medium	Robert Benton	Won	
Academy Awards	Best Cinematography	Néstor Almendros	Nominated	
Academy Awards	Best Film Editing	Gerald B. Greenberg	Nominated	
Blue Ribbon Awards	Best Foreign Language Film	Robert Benton	Won	
British Academy Film Awards	Best Film	Stanley R. Jaffe	Nominated	
British Academy Film Awards	Best Direction	Robert Benton	Nominated	
British Academy Film Awards	Best Actor in a Leading Role	Dustin Hoffman	Nominated	
British Academy Film Awards	Best Actress in a Leading Role	Meryl Streep	Nominated	
British Academy Film Awards	Best Screenplay	Robert Benton	Nominated	
British Academy Film Awards	Best Editing	Gerald B. Greenberg	Nominated	
César Awards	Best Foreign Film	Robert Benton	Nominated	
David di Donatello Awards	Best Foreign Film	Robert Benton	Won	
David di Donatello Awards	Best Foreign Actor	Dustin Hoffman	Won (Note: Tied with Jack Lemmon for The China Syndrome.)	
David di Donatello Awards	Special David	Justin Henry	Won	
Directors Guild of America Awards	Outstanding Directorial Achievement in Motion Pictures	Robert Benton	Won	
Fotogramas de Plata	Best Foreign Performer	Dustin Hoffman	Nominated	
Fotogramas de Plata	Best Foreign Performer	Meryl Streep (Note: Also for Manhattan.)	Nominated	
Golden Globe Awards	Best Motion Picture – Drama		Won	
Golden Globe Awards	Best Actor in a Motion Picture – Drama	Dustin Hoffman	Won	
Golden Globe Awards	Best Supporting Actor – Motion Picture	Justin Henry	Nominated	
Golden Globe Awards	Best Supporting Actress – Motion Picture	Jane Alexander	Nominated	
Golden Globe Awards	Best Supporting Actress – Motion Picture	Meryl Streep	Won	
Golden Globe Awards	Best Director – Motion Picture	Robert Benton	Nominated	
Golden Globe Awards	Best Screenplay – Motion Picture	Robert Benton	Won	
Golden Globe Awards	New Star of the Year – Actor	Justin Henry	Nominated	
Hochi Film Awards	Best International Picture	Robert Benton	Won	
Japan Academy Film Prize	Outstanding Foreign Language Film		Won	
Jupiter Awards	Best International Actor	Dustin Hoffman	Nominated	
Kansas City Film Critics Circle Awards	Best Film	Robert Benton	Won	
Kansas City Film Critics Circle Awards	Best Director	Robert Benton	Won	
Kansas City Film Critics Circle Awards	Best Actor	Dustin Hoffman	Won	
Kansas City Film Critics Circle Awards	Best Supporting Actress	Meryl Streep	Won	
Kinema Junpo Awards	Best Foreign Film	Robert Benton	Won	
Korean Association of Film Critics Awards	Best Foreign Film	Robert Benton	Won	
Los Angeles Film Critics Association Awards	Best Film	Robert Benton	Won	
Los Angeles Film Critics Association Awards	Best Director	Robert Benton	Won	
Los Angeles Film Critics Association Awards	Best Actor	Dustin Hoffman	Won	
Los Angeles Film Critics Association Awards	Best Supporting Actress	Meryl Streep (Note: Also for Manhattan and The Seduction of Joe Tynan.)	Won	
National Board of Review Awards	Top Ten Films		Won	
National Board of Review Awards	Best Supporting Actress	Meryl Streep	Won	
National Society of Film Critics Awards	Best Film	Robert Benton	Nominated	
National Society of Film Critics Awards	Best Director	Robert Benton	Won	
National Society of Film Critics Awards	Best Actor	Dustin Hoffman	Won	
National Society of Film Critics Awards	Best Supporting Actress	Jane Alexander	Nominated	
National Society of Film Critics Awards	Best Supporting Actress	Meryl Streep	Won	
New York Film Critics Circle Awards	Best Film	Robert Benton	Won	
New York Film Critics Circle Awards	Best Director	Robert Benton	Nominated	
New York Film Critics Circle Awards	Best Actor	Dustin Hoffman	Won	
New York Film Critics Circle Awards	Best Supporting Actress	Jane Alexander	Nominated	
New York Film Critics Circle Awards	Best Supporting Actress	Meryl Streep (Note: Also for The Seduction of Joe Tynan.)	Won	
Online Film & Television Association Awards	Hall of Fame – Motion Picture		Won	
Writers Guild of America Awards	Best Drama – Adapted from Another Medium	Robert Benton	Won	
Young Artist Awards	Best Leading Young Actor in a Feature Film	Justin Henry	Won	

American Film Institute Lists

- AFI's 100 Years...100 Movies – Nominated
- AFI's 100 Years...100 Movies (10th Anniversary Edition) – Nominated
- AFI's 10 Top 10 – #3 Courtroom Drama

== Cultural influence ==
Kramer vs. Kramer reflected a cultural shift that occurred during the 1970s, when ideas about motherhood and fatherhood were changing. The film was widely praised for the way in which it gave equal weight and importance to both Joanna and Ted's points of view.

The film made use of the first movement of Antonio Vivaldi's Mandolin Concerto in C Major, making the piece more familiar among classical music listeners.

Daniel Balavoine's "Mon fils ma bataille" (1980), a song about a painful divorce and a father's struggle to keep custody of his child, was inspired by the singer-songwriter's own parents' divorce, his guitarist Colin Swinburne's divorce, and by Kramer vs. Kramer.

== Adaptation ==
In 1987, the film was remade in Turkish as Oğulcan, directed and acted by Cüneyt Arkın, in Hindi as Akele Hum Akele Tum in 1995, starring Aamir Khan and Manisha Koirala, and in Urdu as Zindagi Kitni Haseen Hay in 2016, starring Sajal Ali and Feroze Khan.

== See also ==
- Trial film
- Mrs. Doubtfire (1993)
- Instructions Not Included (2013)
- Marriage Story (2019)
