= The China Syndrome =

1979 film by James Bridges

- Promotional poster
- Directed by: James Bridges
- Written by: Mike Gray; T. S. Cook; James Bridges
- Produced by: Michael Douglas
- Starring: Jane Fonda; Jack Lemmon; Michael Douglas
- Cinematography: James Crabe
- Edited by: David Rawlins
- Music by: Stephen Bishop
- Production companies: IPC Films; Major Studio Partners
- Distributed by: Columbia Pictures
- Release date: March 16, 1979
- Running time: 122 minutes
- Country: United States
- Language: English
- Budget: $5.9 million
- Box office: $51.7 million

The China Syndrome is a 1979 American thriller film directed by James Bridges and written by Bridges, Mike Gray, and T. S. Cook. The film stars Jane Fonda, Jack Lemmon, and Michael Douglas (who also produced). It follows a television reporter and her cameraman who discover safety coverups at a nuclear power plant. "China syndrome" is a term that describes a fictional result of a nuclear meltdown, where reactor fuel melts through reactor containment structures and into the underlying earth, "all the way to China".

The China Syndrome premiered at the 1979 Cannes Film Festival, where it competed for the Palme d'Or while Lemmon received the Best Actor Prize. It was theatrically released on March 16, 1979, twelve days before the Three Mile Island nuclear accident in Dauphin County, Pennsylvania, which gave the film's subject matter an unexpected prescience. It became a critical and commercial success. Reviewers praised the film's screenplay, direction, and performances (most notably of Fonda and Lemmon), while it grossed $51.7 million on a production budget of $5.9 million. The film received four nominations at the 52nd Academy Awards: Best Actor (for Lemmon), Best Actress (for Fonda), Best Original Screenplay and Best Art Direction.

== Plot ==
While visiting the Ventana nuclear power plant outside Los Angeles, television news reporter Kimberly Wells, her cameraman Richard Adams and their soundman Hector Salas witness the plant going through a turbine trip and corresponding SCRAM (emergency shutdown). Shift Supervisor Jack Godell notices an unusual vibration in his cup of coffee.

In response to a gauge indicating high water levels, Godell begins removing water from the core, but the gauge remains high as operators open more valves to dump water. Another operator notices a second gauge indicating low water levels. Godell taps the first gauge, which immediately unsticks and drops to indicate very low levels. The crew urgently pumps water back in and celebrates in relief at bringing the reactor back under control. (Note: The sequence of events in the movie is based on events that occurred in 1970 at the Dresden Generating Station outside Chicago. In that case, the indicator stuck low and the operators responded by adding even more water.)

Adams has surreptitiously filmed the incident, despite being asked not to film for security reasons. Wells' superior refuses to broadcast her report on the incident. Adams steals the footage and shows it to experts who conclude that the plant came perilously close to meltdown—‌the China syndrome.

During an inspection of the plant before it is brought back online, Godell discovers a puddle of radioactive water that has apparently leaked from a pump. He pushes to delay restarting the plant, but the plant superintendent wants nothing standing in the way of the restart.

Godell finds that a series of radiographs supposedly verifying the welds on the leaking pump are identical—‌the contractor simply kept resubmitting the same picture. He brings the evidence to the plant superintendent, who brushes him off as paranoid, stating that new radiographs would cost $20 million. Godell confronts Royce, an employee of Foster-Sullivan who built the plant, as it was he who signed off on the radiographs. Godell threatens to go to the Nuclear Regulatory Commission, but Royce threatens him; later, a pair of men from Foster-Sullivan park outside his house.

Wells and Adams confront Godell at his home and he voices his concerns. Wells and Adams ask him to testify at the NRC hearings over Foster-Sullivan's plans to build another nuclear plant. Godell agrees to obtain, through Salas, the false radiographs to take to the hearings.

Salas' car is run off the road and the radiographs are taken from him. Godell is chased by the men waiting outside his home. He takes refuge inside the plant, where he finds that the reactor is being brought up to full power. Grabbing a gun from a security guard, he forces everyone out, including his friend and co-worker Ted Spindler, and demands to be interviewed by Wells on live television. Plant management agrees to the interview in order to buy time as they try to regain control of the plant.

Minutes into the broadcast, plant technicians deliberately cause a SCRAM so they can distract Godell and retake the control room. A SWAT team forces its way in, the television cable is cut, and Godell is shot. Before dying, he feels the unusual vibration again. The resulting SCRAM is brought under control only by the plant's automatic systems, and the plant suffers significant damage as the pump malfunctions.

Plant officials try to paint Godell as emotionally disturbed, but are contradicted by a distraught Spindler on live television saying Godell was not crazy and would never have taken such drastic steps had there not been something wrong. A tearful Wells concludes her report and the news cuts to a commercial for microwave ovens.

== Cast ==
- Jane Fonda as Kimberly Wells
- Jack Lemmon as Jack Godell
- Michael Douglas as Richard Adams
- Scott Brady as Herman DeYoung
- James Hampton as Bill Gibson
- Peter Donat as Don Jacovich
- Wilford Brimley as Ted Spindler
- Richard Herd as Evan McCormack
- Daniel Valdez as Hector Salas
- Stan Bohrman as Pete Martin
- James Karen as Mac Churchill

== Reception ==
Roger Ebert reviewed The China Syndrome as:

[...] a terrific thriller that incidentally raises the most unsettling questions about how safe nuclear power plants really are [...] The movie is [...] well-acted, well-crafted, scary as hell. The events leading up to the "accident" in The China Syndrome are indeed based on actual occurrences at nuclear plants. Even the most unlikely mishap (a stuck needle on a graph causing engineers to misread a crucial water level) really happened at the Dresden plant outside Chicago. And yet the movie works so well not because of its factual basis, but because of its human content. The performances are so good, so consistently, that The China Syndrome becomes a thriller dealing in personal values.

John Simon said The China Syndrome was a taut, intelligent, and chillingly gripping thriller till it turns melodramatic at its end. He called the ending both false and bathetic.

On the review aggregator website Rotten Tomatoes, 88% of 42 critics' reviews are positive. The website's consensus reads: "With gripping themes and a stellar cast, The China Syndrome is the rare thriller that's as thought-provoking as it is tense." On Metacritic it has a score of 81 based on reviews from 16 critics, indicating "universal acclaim".

=== Box office ===
The film opened in 534 theatres in the United States and grossed $4,354,854 (equivalent to $19.3 million in 2025) in its opening weekend.

=== Response of nuclear industry ===
The March 1979 release was met with backlash from the nuclear power industry which called it "sheer fiction" and a "character assassination of an entire industry". Twelve days later, the Three Mile Island nuclear accident occurred in Dauphin County, Pennsylvania. While some credit the accident's timing in helping to sell tickets, the studio attempted to avoid appearing as if they were exploiting the accident, including pulling the film from some theaters.

=== Accolades ===
| Award | Category | Recipient | Result |
|---|---|---|---|
| Academy Awards | Best Actor | Jack Lemmon | Nominated |
| Academy Awards | Best Actress | Jane Fonda | Nominated |
| Academy Awards | Best Screenplay – Written Directly for the Screen | Mike Gray, T.S. Cook and James Bridges | Nominated |
| Academy Awards | Best Art Direction | Art Direction: George Jenkins; Set Decoration: Arthur Jeph Parker | Nominated |
| British Academy Film Awards | Best Film | James Bridges | Nominated |
| British Academy Film Awards | Best Actor in a Leading Role | Jack Lemmon | Won |
| British Academy Film Awards | Best Actress in a Leading Role | Jane Fonda | Won |
| British Academy Film Awards | Best Screenplay | Mike Gray, T.S. Cook and James Bridges | Nominated |
| Cannes Film Festival | Palme d'Or | James Bridges | Nominated |
| Cannes Film Festival | Best Actor | Jack Lemmon | Won |
| David di Donatello Awards | Best Foreign Actor | Jack Lemmon | Won (Note: Tied with Dustin Hoffman for Kramer vs. Kramer.) |
| Directors Guild of America Awards | Outstanding Directorial Achievement in Motion Pictures | James Bridges | Nominated |
| Golden Globe Awards | Best Motion Picture – Drama | | Nominated |
| Golden Globe Awards | Best Actor in a Motion Picture – Drama | Jack Lemmon | Nominated |
| Golden Globe Awards | Best Actress in a Motion Picture – Drama | Jane Fonda | Nominated |
| Golden Globe Awards | Best Director – Motion Picture | James Bridges | Nominated |
| Golden Globe Awards | Best Screenplay – Motion Picture | Mike Gray, T.S. Cook and James Bridges | Nominated |
| National Board of Review Awards | Top Ten Films | | 4th Place |
| National Society of Film Critics Awards | Best Actor | Jack Lemmon | 4th Place |
| Satellite Awards | Best Classic DVD | | Nominated |
| Writers Guild of America Awards | Best Drama Written Directly for the Screen | Mike Gray, T.S. Cook and James Bridges | Won |

== See also ==
- Chernobyl (miniseries)
- Nuclear and radiation accidents and incidents
