= 10 (1979 film) =

1979 film directed by Blake Edwards

- Theatrical release poster by John Alvin
- Directed by: Blake Edwards
- Written by: Anita Bath
- Produced by: Blake Edwards; Tony Adams
- Starring: Dudley Moore; Julie Andrews; Bo Derek; Robert Webber
- Cinematography: Frank Stanley
- Edited by: Ralph E. Winters
- Music by: Henry Mancini
- Distributed by: Orion Pictures (through Warner Bros.)
- Release date: October 5, 1979
- Running time: 122 minutes
- Country: United States
- Language: English
- Budget: $5-6 million
- Box office: $107 million

10 is a 1979 American romantic comedy film written, produced and directed by Blake Edwards and starring Dudley Moore, Julie Andrews, Robert Webber, and Bo Derek. It was considered a trendsetting film at the time of its release and became one of the year's biggest box-office hits. The film follows middle-aged composer George Webber who becomes infatuated with Jenny Hanley, a newlywed young woman he has never met, and pursues her to Mexico.

== Plot ==
Actress Samantha Taylor throws a surprise 42nd birthday party for her boyfriend, the wealthy and famous composer George Webber. During it, George finds that he is coping badly with his age. From his car, George glimpses a bride on her way to be married and is instantly obsessed with her beauty. Following her to the church, he crashes into a police cruiser, is stung by a bee and nearly disrupts the wedding ceremony.

Later that night, Sam and George argue over his treatment of women and his habit of spying on the intimate acts of a neighbor with his consent. George later visits the minister who performed the wedding and learns that the woman is Jenny Miles, daughter of a prominent Beverly Hills dentist. The following day, while spying on his neighbor, George hits himself with the telescope and falls down an embankment, causing him to miss Sam's phone call. Still obsessed with Jenny, he schedules a dental appointment with her father and learns that Jenny and her husband David have gone to Mexico for their honeymoon. The effects of a large amount of treatment accompanied by a heavy dose of novocaine, aggravated by immediate heavy drinking, leave George completely incoherent. Sam finally reaches him on the phone, but mistakes him for an intruder and calls the police, who hold George at gunpoint while trying to understand his gibberish. George visits his neighbor's house to take part in an ongoing orgy, but Sam spots him through his telescope, widening the rift between them.

George impulsively boards a plane to follow the newlyweds to their exclusive resort in Mexico. In the bar, George encounters old acquaintance Mary Lewis, who lacks self-confidence. When they attempt a fling, Mary interprets George's inadequacy in bed as confirmation of her own insecurities.

At the beach, George sees Jenny in a swimsuit and is awestruck again by her beauty. Noticing that her husband has fallen asleep on a surfboard, George rents a catamaran and rescues David, making him a hero. Sam sees George on a TV newscast and tries to contact him unsuccessfully. David is hospitalized with sunburn, allowing Jenny and George to spend time alone together. Jenny smokes marijuana and seduces George while playing Ravel's "Boléro," but he is horrified when Jenny takes a call from David and casually informs him of George's presence. George is even more confused with David's complete lack of concern. Jenny explains that she is in an open marriage and married David only because of pressure from her conservative father. George leaves after realizing that Jenny sees their tryst as nothing more than a casual fling.

After flying home, George reconciles with Sam by performing an apologetic new song and demonstrating greater maturity. He suggests getting married, but they agree that they should first work on arguing less and having sex more. George takes an idea from Jenny when he starts "Boléro" on his phonograph and has sex with Sam in full view of the neighbor's telescope. However, the neighbor has already stopped watching out of frustration that he provides erotic entertainment for George and gets nothing in return.

== Cast ==
- Dudley Moore as George Webber
- Julie Andrews as Samantha Taylor
- Bo Derek as Jennifer "Jenny" Miles Hanley
- Robert Webber as Hugh
- Walter George Walton as Larry
- Dee Wallace as Mary Lewis
- Sam J. Jones as David Hanley
- Don Calfa as The Neighbor
- Brian Dennehy as Don
- Doug Sheehan as The Policeman
- Max Showalter as Reverend
- Nedra Volz as Mrs. Kissell
- James Noble as Dr. Miles
- Rad Daly as Josh Taylor

== Production ==
10 originally had a budget of $5–6 million and was due to start filming on October 2, 1978, but George Segal didn't show up and the production was cancelled. Dudley Moore was a last-minute replacement and the script was rewritten. Blake Edwards sued Segal and won $270,000. Due to the stopping and restarting of production, the budget was expected to be higher than originally planned. Filming took place in Los Angeles and Mexico.

Peter Sellers originally had a cameo as a night club drummer but the scene was cut.

== Release ==
10 was released by Warner Bros. on October 5, 1979, opening in 706 theaters. It was released on DVD through Warner Home Video on May 21, 1997, and a Blu-ray edition was released on February 1, 2011. The supplemental material consists of the original theatrical trailer and a four-minute promotional documentary, present on both media.

== Reception ==
10 opened at number one in the United States, grossing $3,526,692 ($15.6 million in 2025) for its opening weekend. The film went on to make a total of $74,865,517 ($245 million in 2025) in the U.S. and Canada by the end of 1980, making it one of the top-grossing films released in 1979. Worldwide, it grossed over $107 million. It received mostly positive reviews from critics. On Rotten Tomatoes, it has an approval rating of 65% based on 26 reviews, with an average rating of 6.40/10. The site's consensus states: "Blake Edwards' bawdy comedy may not score a perfect 10, but Dudley Moore's self-deprecating performance makes this midlife crisis persistently funny." On Metacritic, the film has a score of 68% based on reviews from seven critics, indicating "generally favorable" reviews.

Vincent Canby of The New York Times described 10 as "frequently hilarious", praising the performances by Moore and Julie Andrews and concluding that the film "is loaded with odd surprises". Roger Ebert gave the film four stars in his review for the Chicago Sun-Times, calling it "one of the best films Blake Edwards has ever made"; he also ranked it 10th on his annual top-ten list. Gene Siskel of the Chicago Tribune called the film "a very funny comedy that couldn't be more serious about the plight of its lead character". He also noted that the film "turns out to be a gentle essay on the problems of male menopause".

The New York Times included the film on its Best 1,000 Movies Ever list from 2003.

=== Accolades ===
Award	Category	Recipients	Result
Academy Awards	Best Original Score	Henry Mancini	Nominated
Academy Awards	Best Original Song	"It's Easy to Say": Music by Henry Mancini; Lyrics by Robert Wells	Nominated
Golden Globe Awards	Best Motion Picture – Musical or Comedy		Nominated
Golden Globe Awards	Best Actor in a Motion Picture – Musical or Comedy	Dudley Moore	Nominated
Golden Globe Awards	Best Actress in a Motion Picture – Musical or Comedy	Julie Andrews	Nominated
Golden Globe Awards	Best Original Score – Motion Picture	Henry Mancini	Nominated
Golden Globe Awards	New Star of the Year – Actress	Bo Derek	Nominated
Jupiter Awards	Best International Actress	Bo Derek	Nominated
National Society of Film Critics Awards	Best Film		4th Place
National Society of Film Critics Awards	Best Director	Blake Edwards	4th Place
National Society of Film Critics Awards	Best Screenplay	Blake Edwards	5th Place
Writers Guild of America Awards	Best Comedy – Written Directly for the Screenplay	Blake Edwards	Nominated

== Cultural impact ==
Bo Derek's role shot her to instant stardom and status as a sex symbol. Her beaded and plaited cornrow hairstyle in the film was widely copied.

The film also brought renewed fame to the one-movement orchestral piece Boléro by Maurice Ravel, whose music was still under copyright at the time. As a result of the film, sales of Boléro generated an estimated $1 million in royalties and briefly made Ravel the best-selling classical composer 40 years after his death. Derek appeared in a 1984 film named Bolero, titled to capitalize upon the piece's renewed popularity.

== Remake ==
In 2003, it was announced that Blake Edwards would direct a remake to be titled 10 Again for MDP Worldwide, but the project was abandoned.

Deadline reported in 2020 that Warner Bros. was planning a remake of the movie. Karen McCullah and Kirsten Smith were attached to write the movie, Sue Kroll, Jeff Nathanson, Ashok Amritraj, and Julie Andrews would serve as producers. The remake never eventuated.
