= Norma Rae =

1979 film by Martin Ritt

- Theatrical release poster
- Directed by: Martin Ritt
- Screenplay by: Irving Ravetch; Harriet Frank Jr.
- Produced by: Tamara Asseyev; Alexandra Rose
- Starring: Sally Field; Ron Leibman; Beau Bridges; Pat Hingle; Barbara Baxley
- Cinematography: John A. Alonzo
- Edited by: Sidney Levin
- Music by: David Shire
- Distributed by: 20th Century-Fox
- Release date: March 2, 1979
- Running time: 110 minutes
- Country: United States
- Language: English
- Budget: $4.5 million
- Box office: $22.2 million

Norma Rae is a 1979 American drama film directed by Martin Ritt from a screenplay written by Irving Ravetch and Harriet Frank Jr. The film is based on the true story of Crystal Lee Sutton – which was told in the 1975 book Crystal Lee, a Woman of Inheritance by reporter Henry P. Leifermann of The New York Times – and stars Sally Field in the title role. Beau Bridges, Ron Leibman, Pat Hingle, Barbara Baxley and Gail Strickland are featured in supporting roles. The film follows Norma Rae Webster, a factory worker with little formal education in North Carolina who, after she and her co-workers' health are compromised due to poor working conditions, becomes involved in trade union activities at the textile factory where she works.

Norma Rae premiered at the 1979 Cannes Film Festival where it competed for the Palme d'Or, while Field won the Best Actress Prize. It was theatrically released by 20th Century-Fox on March 2, 1979, to critical and commercial success. Reviewers praised the film's direction, its screenplay, its message, and especially Field's performance, while the film grossed $22 million on a production budget of $4.5 million. The film received four nominations at the 52nd Academy Awards including Best Picture and won two: Best Actress (for Field) and Best Original Song for its theme song "It Goes Like It Goes". The film is considered "culturally, historically or aesthetically" significant by the U.S. Library of Congress and was selected for preservation in the National Film Registry in 2011.

== Plot ==
Norma Rae Webster is a worker in a cotton mill that has taken too much of a toll on her family's health for her to ignore their poor working conditions. She is also a single mother with two children by different fathers, one dead and the other negligent, and frequently has flings with other men to alleviate her loneliness and boredom. Initially, management tries to divert her frequent protests by promoting her to "spot checker", where she is responsible for ensuring other workers are fulfilling work quotas. She reluctantly takes the job for the pay hike, but when fellow employees, including her father, shun her for effectively being a "fink" to the bosses, she demands to be fired. Instead, she is demoted back to the line.

Two men enter her life, and that changes her perspective. A former co-worker, Sonny Webster, asks her out after causing trouble for her at the mill. Divorced with a daughter, he proposes marriage after a short courtship; recognizing how long it has been since she met a non-selfish man with whom to keep company, she accepts his offer. After a few charged encounters with Reuben Warshowsky, a union organizer from New York City, Norma Rae listens to him deliver a speech that spurs her to join the effort to unionize her shop. This causes conflict when Sonny observes she's not spending enough time at home and is frequently exhausted when she is present. When her father drops dead at the mill of a heart attack—a death that could have been averted had he been allowed to leave his post early instead of waiting for his allotted break—she is more determined to continue the fight.

Management retaliates against the unionization efforts, first by rearranging shifts so that workers are doing more work at less pay and then by posting fliers with racial invective in the hope of dividing white and black workers and diluting the momentum. Warshowsky demands Norma copy down the racist flier word for word to use it as evidence for government sanctions against her mill. When she attempts to transcribe the flier, management tries to stop her, then fires her on the grounds of creating a disturbance and calls the police to remove her from the mill. While awaiting the sheriff, Norma Rae takes a piece of cardboard, writes the word "UNION" on it, stands on her work table, and slowly turns to show the sign around the room. The other workers stop their mill machines one by one, and eventually, the room becomes silent. After all the machines have been switched off, Norma Rae is taken to jail but is freed by Reuben.

Upon returning home to her family, Norma decides to talk to her children and tell them the story of her life, their questionable parentage, and her recent arrest so they are prepared for any smears that may come from those hoping to discredit her efforts. After a tense exchange with Reuben, Sonny asks her if they have been intimate; she says no but acknowledges, "he's in my head." Sonny, in turn, tells her there's no other woman in his head, and he will always remain with her.

An election to unionize the factory occurs. Norma and Reuben listen as best as possible from outside the mill as reporters and TV cameras observe the vote count. With a difference of just 100 votes, the union wins. Shortly after, Reuben says goodbye to Norma; despite being smitten with her, they shake hands because he knows she is married and loves her husband, and Reuben heads back to New York.

== Cast ==
- Sally Field as Norma Rae Webster
- Beau Bridges as Sonny Webster
- Ron Leibman as Reuben Warshowsky
- Pat Hingle as Vernon
- Barbara Baxley as Leona
- Gail Strickland as Bonnie Mae
- Morgan Paull as Wayne Billings
- Robert Broyles as Sam Bolen
- Jack Calvin as Ellis Harper
- Booth Colman as Dr. Watson
- Lee de Broux as Lujan
- James Luisi as George Benson
- Vernon Weddle as Rev. Hubbard
- Bob Minor as Lucius White
- Gregory Walcott as Sheriff Lamar Miller
- Noble Willingham as Leroy Mason
- Lonny Chapman as Gardner
- Bert Freed as Sam Dakin
- Frank McRae as James Brown
- Joe Dorsey as Woodrow Thompson
- Grace Zabriskie as Linette Odum
- J. Don Ferguson as Peter Gallat
- Sandra Dorsey as Jail Matron
- George R. Robertson as Farmer

== Production ==
Norma Rae was filmed on location in Opelika, Alabama. The mill scenes were shot at the Opelika Manufacturing Corp., and the motel scenes were filmed at The Golden Cherry Motel.

=== Inspiration ===
The movie's plot is based on events from the life of textile worker and union organizer Crystal Lee Sutton, who fought the J.P. Stevens Textiles mill in her hometown Roanoke Rapids, North Carolina. The scene where Norma Rae writes "UNION" on a sheet of cardboard and stands on a table until her co-workers shut off their machines is closely based on a protest by Sutton in 1978. Although Sutton was fired from her job, the mill was unionized and she went to work as an organizer for the textile union. In 2003 the Stevens textile mill closed, along with hundreds of other similar factories across the Carolinas, as US textile manufacturing moved offshore to countries like China and Mexico.

== Reception ==
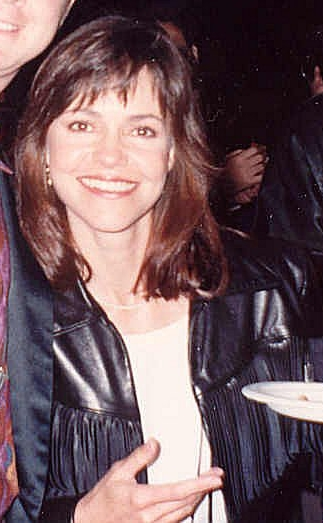
Sally Field's performance received critical acclaim, earning her the Academy Award for Best Actress.

Norma Rae received positive reviews. On Rotten Tomatoes it has an approval rating of 91% based on 32 reviews, with an average rating of 7.6/10. The website's critical consensus reads: "Spearheaded by a galvanizing Sally Field, Norma Rae is a heartening and politically powerful drama about an ordinary woman taking an extraordinary stand." On Metacritic, the film has a weighted average score of 61 out of 100, based on reviews from 10 critics.

Vincent Canby of The New York Times praised Field's performance, declaring that "we are witnessing one of those unusual motion picture performances that seems to be in the process of taking off as we watch it ... Her triumph in Norma Rae is to have shucked off at long last all need to associate her with her TV beginnings, not because they are vulgar but because the performance she gives here is as big as the screen that presents it". Variety wrote, "'Norma Rae' is a superb film. Paced by Sally Field's best performance to date in a rapidly accelerating career, and under Martin Ritt's firm but sensitive direction, the 20th Century-Fox release is that rare entity, an intelligent film with heart."

Gene Siskel of the Chicago Tribune gave the film two and a half out of four, and praised Field for a "thoroughly winning performance", but thought that Leibman gave a "lousy, overbearing performance that, for me, wrecked the movie". Charles Champlin of the Los Angeles Times called the film "a wonderful and—for want of a better word—judicious work".

Penelope Gilliatt of The New Yorker wrote "This picture is historically fascinating in what it tells us of the labor movement, and it does honor to a particular sort of involved character who will not be intimidated. Well done." Gary Arnold of The Washington Post stated that "Sally Field embodies the title character with considerable sincerity", but that the film "comes so unraveled that in retrospect the images of loose strands of fiber in the air seem more significant than the character of the heroine or the bleak factory environment. The screenplay by Irving Ravetch and Harriet Frank Jr. ... turns out to be a pile of loose thematic and emotional strands".

Tom Milne of The Monthly Film Bulletin wrote "Heart-warming is probably the word for Norma Rae, a film which leaves no cliché unturned in its cosy efforts to demonstrate how a woman no better than she ought to be becomes better than most of us."

=== Retrospective lists ===
The New York Times placed the film on its Best 1000 Movies Ever list.

== Awards and nominations ==
Award	Category	Nominee(s)	Result	Ref.
Academy Awards	Best Picture	Tamara Asseyev and Alex Rose	Nominated	
Academy Awards	Best Actress	Sally Field	Won	
Academy Awards	Best Adapted Screenplay	Irving Ravetch and Harriet Frank Jr.	Nominated	
Academy Awards	Best Original Song	"It Goes Like It Goes"; Music by David Shire; Lyrics by Norman Gimbel	Won	
American Movie Awards	Best Actress	Sally Field	Won	
Cannes Film Festival	Palme d'Or	Martin Ritt	Nominated	
Cannes Film Festival	Technical Grand Prize	Martin Ritt	Won	
Cannes Film Festival	Best Actress	Sally Field	Won	
Golden Globe Awards	Best Motion Picture – Drama		Nominated	
Golden Globe Awards	Best Actress in a Motion Picture – Drama	Sally Field	Won	
Golden Globe Awards	Best Screenplay – Motion Picture	Irving Ravetch and Harriet Frank Jr.	Nominated	
Kansas City Film Critics Circle Awards	Best Actress	Sally Field	Won	
Los Angeles Film Critics Association Awards	Best Actress	Sally Field	Won	
National Board of Review Awards	Best Actress	Sally Field	Won	
National Film Preservation Board	National Film Registry		Inducted	
National Society of Film Critics Awards	Best Actress	Sally Field	Won	
New York Film Critics Circle Awards	Best Actress	Sally Field	Won	
Writers Guild of America Awards	Best Drama – Adapted from Another Medium	Irving Ravetch and Harriet Frank Jr.	Nominated	

In 2011, Norma Rae was selected for the United States National Film Registry by the Library of Congress as being "culturally, historically, or aesthetically significant".

The film is recognized by American Film Institute in these lists:

- 2003: AFI's 100 Years...100 Heroes & Villains:
  - Norma Rae Webster – #15 Hero
- 2006: AFI's 100 Years...100 Cheers – #16

== Home media ==
Norma Rae was released on VHS in 1980 (Magnetic Video Corporation, CL-1082), on DVD in December 2006, and Blu-ray in April 2014.

== Musical adaptation ==
In December 2017, it was announced that Norma Rae was to be adapted into a stage musical. Rosanne Cash was set to compose the score.
