= Gerald B. Greenberg =

American film editor (1936–2017)

Gerald Bernard "Jerry" Greenberg (July 29, 1936 – December 22, 2017) was an American film editor with more than 40 feature film credits. Greenberg received both the Academy Award for Best Film Editing and the BAFTA Award for Best Editing for the film The French Connection (1971). In the 1980s, he edited five films with director Brian De Palma.

Greenberg began his career as an assistant to Dede Allen on the film America America (1963), directed by Elia Kazan. Allen has been called "the most important film editor in the most explosive era of American film". She helped develop the careers of several editors known as "Dede's boys", and Greenberg was the first.

Greenberg was Allen's assistant again on Bonnie and Clyde (1967), which was directed by Arthur Penn. The editing of the ambush scene in this film in which Bonnie and Clyde are killed has been very influential, and Allen credited Greenberg with its actual "cutting". Greenberg was the associate editor for Alice's Restaurant (1969), again directed by Penn and edited by Allen. By that time Greenberg's independent editing career had commenced with Bye Bye Braverman (1968), which was directed by Sidney Lumet. Greenberg later co-edited Penn's The Missouri Breaks (1976) with Allen and Stephen A. Rotter.

== Early career ==
A native of New York, as a youth, Greenberg learned to edit music and began familiarizing himself with the moviola, splicers, synchronizers and recorders. In 1960, he was offered an apprenticing job for Dede Allen on Elia Kazan’s America America (1963). By 1967, when he and Allen were on Bonnie and Clyde, he was given the task of editing a couple of the shootout scenes, working closely with Allen and director Arthur Penn. He cut his first solo feature, Bye Bye Braverman, for director Sidney Lumet in 1968.

== Collaboration with William Friedkin ==
Greenberg edited two films with director William Friedkin, The Boys in the Band (1970) and The French Connection (1971). The French Connection was a success at the box-office and won the Academy Award for Best Picture. Friedkin attributed much of the film's success to its editing, writing "I can't say too much about the importance of editing. When I looked at the first rough cut of the chase, it was terrible. It didn't play. It was formless, in spite of the fact that I had a very careful shooting plan that I followed in detail. It became a matter of removing a shot here or adding a shot there, or changing the sequence of shots, or dropping one frame, or adding one or two frames. And here's where I had enormous help from Jerry Greenberg, the editor. As I look back on it now, the shooting was easy. The cutting and the mixing were enormously difficult. It was all enormously rewarding."

The car chase sequence in The French Connection has been called "the finest example of montage editing since Battleship Potemkin (1925)"; this early film, directed and edited by Sergei Eisenstein, was seminal in the development of film editing. Greenberg won the Academy Award for Best Film Editing and the BAFTA Award for Best Editing for the film. In 2012, The French Connection was selected as the tenth best edited film of all time in a listing compiled by the Motion Picture Editors Guild.

== Apocalypse Now (1979) ==
Francis Ford Coppola produced, directed, and co-wrote Apocalypse Now, which was released in 1979. Filming had taken over a year in 1976 and 1977. Editing took place over two years prior to its release, and involved several editors; the supervising editor was Richard Marks, another of "Dede's boys". Greenberg described his own role in an interview with Vincent LoBrutto. The film is now remembered as one of the most important to have emerged from American involvement in the long Vietnam War that had ended in 1975. Writing in 1999, critic Roger Ebert said "Apocalypse Now is the best Vietnam film, one of the greatest of all films, because it pushes beyond the others, into the dark places of the soul. It is not about war so much as about how war reveals truths we would be happy never to discover". In the 2012 critics' poll conducted by the British Sight & Sound magazine, Apocalypse Now was rated the fourteenth best film ever made. The editing of Apocalypse Now was rated third best of all films in the 2012 listing of the Motion Picture Editors Guild. With Marks, Walter Murch, and Lisa Fruchtman, Greenberg shared in the film's nominations for the Academy Award, the BAFTA Award, and the ACE Eddie.

== Collaboration with Brian De Palma ==
With the film Dressed to Kill (1980), Greenberg began a 7-year collaboration with director Brian De Palma. Greenberg edited five films with De Palma, with the last being The Untouchables (1987). Greenberg's assistant editor on Dressed to Kill, Bill Pankow, worked on all these films, and was his co-editor for The Untouchables; Pankow subsequently became De Palma's principal editor.

The period of De Palma's collaboration with Greenberg has been described as follows: De Palma's "early lower-budget thrillers, although superbly manufactured, were too bloody and garish for the average taste and infuriated many critics. But De Palma began gaining respectability with Dressed to Kill (1980) and following several critical setbacks, reached the apex in the late 80s with such high-powered productions as The Untouchables (1987) and Casualties of War (1989). A superb technician, he was finally crafting material worthy of his bold, often dazzling, visual flair."

== Honors and influence ==
Greenberg won the Oscar and the BAFTA awards for The French Connection (1971), and was nominated for the ACE Eddie. With his co-editors, he was nominated again for the Oscar, BAFTA, and Eddie for Apocalypse Now (1979). In the same year, he was nominated for the Oscar and BAFTA for Kramer vs. Kramer (1979), which was the first of his two films with director Robert Benton.

Greenberg has been elected to membership in the American Cinema Editors, and in 2015 that organization honored him with its Career Achievement Award. Writing after the ceremony at which Greenberg received the Career Achievement Ward, Ross Lincoln and Erik Pedersen said, "if editing is the most important part of completing a film, he is one of the most quantifiably influential people in the past 40 years." On the 2012 list of "best edited films of all time", Greenberg worked on three of the top ten: Bonnie and Clyde, The French Connection, and Apocalypse Now.

== Death ==
Greenberg died on December 22, 2017, at the age of 81

== Partial filmography (editor) ==
This filmography of feature films is based on the listing at the Internet Movie Database.

Editor
Year	Film	Director	Notes
1966	The Steps	Leonard Hirschfield	
1968	Bye Bye Braverman	Sidney Lumet	
1968	The Subject Was Roses	Ulu Grosbard	
1970	The Boys in the Band	William Friedkin	First collaboration with William Friedkin
1971	They Might Be Giants	Anthony Harvey	
1971	The French Connection	William Friedkin	Second collaboration with William Friedkin
1972	Come Back, Charleston Blue	Mark Warren	
1972	The Stoolie	John G. Avildsen; George Silano	
1973	Electra Glide in Blue	James William Guercio	
1974	The Taking of Pelham One Two Three	Joseph Sargent	
1975	The Happy Hooker	Nicholas Sgarro	
1976	The Missouri Breaks	Arthur Penn	
1979	Apocalypse Now	Francis Ford Coppola	
1979	Kramer vs. Kramer	Robert Benton	First collaboration with Robert Benton
1980	Dressed to Kill	Brian De Palma	First collaboration with Brian De Palma
1980	Heaven's Gate	Michael Cimino	
1982	Still of the Night	Robert Benton	Second collaboration with Robert Benton
1983	Scarface	Brian De Palma	Second collaboration with Brian De Palma
1984	Body Double	Brian De Palma	Third collaboration with Brian De Palma
1985	Savage Dawn	Simon Nuchtern	
1986	Wise Guys	Brian De Palma	Fourth collaboration with Brian De Palma
1986	No Mercy	Richard Pearce	
1987	The Untouchables	Brian De Palma	Fifth collaboration with Brian De Palma
1988	The Accused	Jonathan Kaplan	
1989	Collision Course	Lewis Teague	
1989	Christmas Vacation	Jeremiah S. Chechik	
1990	Awakenings	Penny Marshall	
1991	For the Boys	Mark Rydell	
1992	School Ties	Robert Mandel	
1998	American History X	Tony Kaye	
1998	Reach the Rock	William Ryan	
1999	Inspector Gadget	David Kellogg	Uncredited
2000	Duets	Bruce Paltrow	
2000	Get Carter	Stephen Kay	
2001	Angel Eyes	Luis Mandoki	First collaboration with Luis Mandoki
2002	Trapped	Luis Mandoki	Second collaboration with Luis Mandoki
2003	Bringing Down the House	Adam Shankman	
2005	Havoc	Barbara Kopple	
2006	Invincible	Ericson Core	First collaboration with Ericson Core
2009	The Answer Man	John Hindman	
2015	Point Break	Ericson Core	Second collaboration with Ericson Core

Editorial department
Year	Film	Director	Role
1969	Alice's Restaurant	Arthur Penn	Associate film editor
1973	The Seven-Ups	Philip D'Antoni	Supervising editor
1981	Reds	Warren Beatty	Additional film editor
1998	Gunshy	Jeff Celentano	Additional editor

Additional crew
Year	Film	Director	Role	Notes
1967	Bonnie and Clyde	Arthur Penn	Assistant editor	Uncredited

Music department
Year	Film	Director	Role
1965	A Thousand Clowns	Fred Coe	Music editor

Producer
Year	Film	Director	Credit
1973	The Seven-Ups	Philip D'Antoni	Associate producer

Thanks
Year	Film	Director	Role
1987	Spaceballs	Mel Brooks	The producer wishes to give special thanks to

Direct-to-video films

Editor
Year	Film	Director
2010	Privileged	Jonah Salander

Shorts

Editor
Year	Film	Director
1982	The Stereo Demonstration Film	Andy Aaron

Thanks
Year	Film	Director	Role
1985	Double Negative	Sam Irvin	Special thanks

TV movies

Editor
Year	Film	Director
1976	The Disappearance of Aimee	Anthony Harvey
2007	The Bronx Is Burning	Jeremiah S. Chechik

Sound department
Year	Film	Director	Role
1964	Carol for Another Christmas	Joseph L. Mankiewicz	Sound effects editor

TV series

Editor
Year	Title	Notes
2007	The Bronx Is Burning	1 episode

TV specials

Thanks
Year	Title	Role
2018	90th Academy Awards	In memoriam
