= The Rose (film) =

1979 film by Mark Rydell

- Theatrical release poster
- Directed by: Mark Rydell
- Screenplay by: Bo Goldman; Bill Kerby; Michael Cimino (uncredited)
- Story by: Bill Kerby
- Produced by: Aaron Russo; Marvin Worth; Anthony Ray
- Starring: Bette Midler; Alan Bates; Frederic Forrest
- Cinematography: Vilmos Zsigmond
- Edited by: Carroll Timothy O'Meara; Robert L. Wolfe
- Music by: Paul A. Rothchild (Mendelssohn – Piano concerto no 1, 2nd movement, the Rose)
- Distributed by: 20th Century-Fox
- Release date: November 7, 1979 (New York City)
- Running time: 134 minutes
- Country: United States
- Language: English
- Budget: $9.3 million
- Box office: $29.2 million (domestic)

The Rose is a 1979 American musical drama film directed by Mark Rydell, and starring Bette Midler, Alan Bates, Frederic Forrest, Harry Dean Stanton, Barry Primus, and David Keith. Loosely based on the life of Janis Joplin, the film follows a self-destructive rock star, Mary Rose Foster, in the late 1960s, who struggles to cope with the pressures of her career and the demands of her ruthless business manager Rudge Campbell.

Originally titled Pearl (Janis Joplin's nickname and the title of her last album), the film's screenplay was revised and fictionalized after the Joplin family declined to allow producers the rights to her story.

The Rose was nominated for four Academy Awards at the 52nd Academy Awards (1980), including Best Actress in a Leading Role (Bette Midler, in her screen debut), Best Actor in a Supporting Role (Frederic Forrest), Best Film Editing and Best Sound. Midler performed the soundtrack album for the film, and its title track became one of her biggest hit singles.

== Plot ==
In late 1969, Mary Rose Foster is a famous rock and roll diva known as "The Rose." In spite of her success, her personal life is lonely and exhausting. She is exploited and overworked by her manager and promoter Rudge Campbell. Rose is an alcoholic and former drug user who looks for approval in her life. As such, she is determined to return to her Florida hometown, now as a superstar, and perform for the people from her past.

Following a performance in New York City, Rose meets with country music star Billy Ray on Long Island, whom she idolizes and whose songs she often covers in live shows. Billy Ray cruelly demands that she never perform his music again and rudely dismisses her. After discovering that Rudge arranged the meeting because he wants to sign Billy Ray to his label, Rose defiantly flees with a limousine driver named Huston Dyer. The two return to New York, where Rose is scheduled to complete recording sessions. They begin a whirlwind romance.

Rudge assumes that Huston is just another hanger-on, but Rose feels she has finally met her true love. Huston eventually admits to her that he is actually an AWOL sergeant from the Army, and she tells him of her past in Florida. The couple's relationship grows turbulent amidst Rose's reckless lifestyle and constant touring. In Memphis, Rose is met by Sarah, a former lover of hers. When Huston walks in on the two women kissing, he and Rose get into a violent fight, after which Huston flees.

Determined to reunite with Huston, Rose searches for him in a red light district of Memphis with PFC Mal, a military member whom she met in Texas. She subsequently appoints Mal as her security escort, and the two travel to Rose's hometown Jacksonville, where Rudge has booked her a hometown reunion show. Upon arriving, Rose shows Mal her childhood home, her high school and other local landmarks from her childhood. Arriving at the stadium for afternoon rehearsals, Rose repeats her intention to take a one-year break from performing, leading Rudge to tell her she will be in breach of contract. Rudge proceeds to fire her, though unbeknownst to Rose, this is only a ploy to ensure that she performs the show. A distraught Rose is met by Huston, who has traveled to Jacksonville to reunite with her.

Believing her concert is cancelled, Rose decides to run away and start a new life with Huston. That night, she takes Huston on a tour of local bars and clubs she used to frequent prior to becoming famous, recklessly drinking and indulging in barbiturates and heroin. At one bar, Huston becomes jealous when a male patron harasses Rose as she performs, and he begins a fight. After, Rudge reaches Rose on her car phone and convinces her to return for the concert. She acquiesces, and her decision to appease Rudge causes Huston to give up on the relationship and leave town. Later that night, after performing the opening song of her long-awaited homecoming concert, Rose collapses onstage and dies of an overdose.

The movie ends with a closing scene of Rose's parents and Mal at a garage, following a member of the press who is following Rose's tragic death. After taking pictures from Rose as a kid, and some clips she gathered from Billy Ray, Mal turns the lights off as they leave and the garage, along with Rose's memories and photographs, goes dark.

== Cast ==
- Bette Midler as Mary Rose "The Rose" Foster
- Alan Bates as Rudge Campbell
- Frederic Forrest as Huston Dyer
- Harry Dean Stanton as Billy Ray
- Barry Primus as Dennis
- David Keith as PFC Mal
- Sandra McCabe as Sarah Willingham
- Will Hare as Mr. Leonard
- James Keane as Sam
- Sandy Ward as Mr. Foster
- Doris Roberts as Mrs. Foster
- Victor Argo as Lockerman
- Rudy Bond as Monty
- Don Calfa as Don Frank
- Danny Weis as Danny, The Rose Band leader
- Mark Leonard as The Rose Band bassist
- Pentti "Whitey" Glan as the Rose Band drummer
- Steve Hunter as The Rose Band guitarist
- Sylvester as drag queen
- Michael Greer as Emcee ("Baby Jane")
- Jonathan Banks as Television Promoter

== Production ==
=== Conception ===
The film was originally offered to Ken Russell, who chose instead to direct Valentino. Russell has described this decision as the biggest mistake of his career. At one point, Michael Cimino was also slated to direct, but he chose to direct Heaven's Gate instead. Cimino did, however, make uncredited contributions to the script.

=== Casting ===
Suzy Williams was originally offered the title role of Mary Rose Forrest, but turned it down for personal reasons, instead suggesting it to Bette Midler.

=== Filming ===
The Rose was completed in time for a scheduled release in April 1979; however, 20th Century Fox elected to postpone release until the fall. "[At] Easter time," Rydell remarked, "the public seems to like frothy films."

== Reception ==
The Rose received a mixed to positive critical reception. The film has a 74% rating on Rotten Tomatoes, based on 23 reviews. Among the positive reviews were Siskel & Ebert, who on their program Sneak Previews gave the film a collective "Yes".

The film opened in New York City on Wednesday, November 7, 1979, and grossed $793,063 in its opening weekend from 44 screens, the second highest-grossing opening weekend on under 50 screens behind Star Wars (1977). The film went on to gross $29.2 million in the United States and Canada.

== Awards and nominations ==
Award	Category	Nominee(s)	Result	Ref.
Academy Awards	Best Actress	Bette Midler	Nominated	
Academy Awards	Best Supporting Actor	Frederic Forrest	Nominated	
Academy Awards	Best Film Editing	Robert L. Wolfe and Carroll Timothy O'Meara	Nominated	
Academy Awards	Best Sound	Theodore Soderberg, Douglas Williams, Paul Wells and Jim Webb	Nominated	
British Academy Film Awards	Best Actress in a Leading Role	Bette Midler	Nominated	
British Academy Film Awards	Best Sound	Theodore Soderberg, Douglas O. Williams, Paul Wells, and James E. Webb	Nominated	
César Awards	Best Foreign Film	Mark Rydell	Nominated	
Golden Globe Awards	Best Motion Picture – Musical or Comedy		Nominated	
Golden Globe Awards	Best Actress in a Motion Picture – Musical or Comedy	Bette Midler	Won	
Golden Globe Awards	Best Supporting Actor – Motion Picture	Frederic Forrest	Nominated	
Golden Globe Awards	Best Original Song – Motion Picture	"The Rose"; Music and Lyrics by Amanda McBroom	Won	
Golden Globe Awards	New Star of the Year – Actress	Bette Midler	Won	
Grammy Awards	Record of the Year	"The Rose" – Bette Midler and Paul A. Rothchild	Nominated	
Grammy Awards	Song of the Year	"The Rose" – Amanda McBroom	Nominated	
Grammy Awards	Best Pop Vocal Performance, Female	"The Rose" – Bette Midler	Won	
National Society of Film Critics Awards	Best Actress	Bette Midler	3rd Place	
National Society of Film Critics Awards	Best Supporting Actor	Frederic Forrest	Won	
New York Film Critics Circle Awards	Best Actress	Bette Midler	Runner-up	
New York Film Critics Circle Awards	Best Supporting Actor	Frederic Forrest	Runner-up	

=== Others ===
The film is recognized by American Film Institute in these lists:

- 2004: AFI's 100 Years...100 Songs:
  - "The Rose" – #83

== Home video ==
VHS 1988 1995 The Criterion Collection released the film on Blu-ray and DVD on May 19, 2015.

== See also ==
- The Rose (song)

== Sources ==
- Solomon, Aubrey (2002). Twentieth Century-Fox: A Corporate and Financial History. Lanham, Maryland: Rowman & Littlefield. ISBN 978-0-8108-4244-1.
