= Robert L. Wolfe =

American film editor

- Born: July 5, 1928
- Died: February 28, 1981 (aged 52)
- Occupation: Film editor

Robert L. Wolfe (July 5, 1928 – February 28, 1981) was an American film editor. He was nominated for the Academy Award for Best Film Editing three times for All the President's Men (1976), The Rose (1979), and On Golden Pond (1981), respectively. Other notable films edited by Wolfe include The Getaway (1972), Pat Garrett and Billy the Kid (1973), The Terminal Man (1974), and The Wind and the Lion (1975).

== Selected filmography ==
Editor
Year	Film	Director	Notes
1970	Monte Walsh	William A. Fraker	
1971	Drive, He Said	Jack Nicholson	
1972	Junior Bonner	Sam Peckinpah	Third collaboration with Sam Peckinpah
1972	The Getaway	Sam Peckinpah	Fourth collaboration with Sam Peckinpah
1973	Pat Garrett and Billy the Kid	Sam Peckinpah	Fifth collaboration with Sam Peckinpah
1973	The Naked Ape	Donald Driver	
1974	The Terminal Man	Mike Hodges	
1975	The Wind and the Lion	John Milius	First collaboration with John Milius
1976	All the President's Men	Alan J. Pakula	
1978	Big Wednesday	John Milius	Second collaboration with John Milius
1979	The Rose	Mark Rydell	First collaboration with Mark Rydell
1980	The Hunter	Buzz Kulik	
1981	On Golden Pond	Mark Rydell	Second collaboration with Mark Rydell

Editorial department
Year	Film	Director	Role	Notes
1969	The Wild Bunch	Sam Peckinpah	Associate film editor	First collaboration with Sam Peckinpah
1971	Straw Dogs	Sam Peckinpah	Editorial consultant	Second collaboration with Sam Peckinpah
1977	The Deep	Peter Yates	Supervising film editor	

Thanks
Year	Film	Director	Role
1981	On Golden Pond	Mark Rydell	This film is respectfully dedicated to the memory of

TV series

Editor
Year	Title	Notes
1961	Lawman	1 episode
1960−62	Hawaiian Eye	3 episodes
1961−62	Surfside 6	6 episodes
1961−62	77 Sunset Strip	6 episodes
1963	The Gallant Men	1 episode
1963	The Dakotas	5 episodes
1963−67	Combat!	39 episodes
1967	Garrison's Gorillas	4 episodes
1969−70	Hawaii Five-O	8 episodes
