= Breaking Away =

1979 film by Peter Yates

- Theatrical release poster
- Directed by: Peter Yates
- Written by: Steve Tesich
- Produced by: Peter Yates
- Starring: Dennis Christopher; Dennis Quaid; Daniel Stern; Jackie Earle Haley; Barbara Barrie; Paul Dooley; Robyn Douglass
- Cinematography: Matthew F. Leonetti
- Edited by: Cynthia Scheider
- Music by: Patrick Williams
- Distributed by: 20th Century-Fox
- Release date: July 13, 1979 (Los Angeles)
- Running time: 101 minutes
- Country: United States
- Language: English
- Budget: $2.3 million
- Box office: $20 million

Breaking Away is a 1979 American coming-of-age comedy-drama film produced and directed by Peter Yates and written by Steve Tesich. It follows a group of four male teenagers in Bloomington, Indiana, who have recently graduated from high school. The film stars Dennis Christopher, Dennis Quaid, Daniel Stern (in his film debut), Jackie Earle Haley, Barbara Barrie, Paul Dooley, and Robyn Douglass.

Breaking Away won the 1979 Academy Award for Best Original Screenplay for Tesich, and received nominations in four other categories, including Best Picture and Best Supporting Actress (Barbara Barrie). It also won the 1979 Golden Globe Award for Best Film (Comedy or Musical) and received nominations in three other Golden Globe categories. The film was ranked eighth on the List of America's 100 Most Inspiring Movies compiled by the American Film Institute (AFI) in 2006. In June 2008, the AFI also ranked the film as the eighth greatest American sports film of all time as a part of its 10 Top 10 that year.

As the film's young lead, Christopher won the 1979 BAFTA Award for Most Promising Newcomer and the 1979 Young Artist Award for Best Juvenile Actor, as well as getting a Golden Globe nomination as New Star of the Year.

== Plot ==
Dave, Mike, Cyril, and Moocher are working-class friends in the university town of Bloomington, Indiana who graduated from high school the year before, are not sure what to do with their lives, and consider attending university unrealistic. They spend time swimming in an abandoned water-filled limestone quarry and sometimes clash with the more affluent Indiana University students in their hometown, who refer to them disparagingly as "cutters," referring to the locals' common work in the limestone industry.

Dave is obsessed with competitive bicycle racing, Italian racers in particular, because he recently won a Masi bicycle. His down-to-earth father, Ray, a former stonecutter who now operates his own used car business, is puzzled and exasperated by his son's love of Italian music and culture, which Dave associates with cycling. His mother, Evelyn, is more indulgent and prepares Italian dishes for the family, to Ray's annoyance.

Dave masquerades as an Italian exchange student to romance a university student named Katherine, and serenades "Caterina" outside her sorority house with Friedrich von Flotow's aria M Apparì Tutt' Amor to Cyril's guitar accompaniment. Katherine's boyfriend, Rod, and his fraternity brothers beat Cyril up, mistaking him for the suitor. Mike, a former high school football quarterback, insists on tracking down Rod for revenge over Cyril's objections. The university president reprimands the students for their arrogance toward the "cutters" and, over the students' objections, invites the town to field a team for the annual Indiana University Little 500 race.

An Italian cycling team comes to town for an exhibition race and are annoyed by Dave's challenge to their preordained victory. They force him to crash. Despite the disillusionment this causes him, Dave is persuaded by his friends to join them in racing the Little 500. Ray privately tells his son how, when he was a young stonecutter, he was proud to help build the university but never felt welcome on campus. Dave, having confessed his deception to Katherine, patches things up before she leaves for a job in Chicago.

Dave, the only skilled cyclist among his friends, rides most of the Little 500 without a break unlike the other teams, which switch riders. He gains a small lead, but is injured in a crash and comes in for a change. Mike, Cyril, and Moocher are unable to keep pace with the field. Dave has his feet taped to the pedals, committing him to finish the race himself, makes up the lost ground, and overtakes Rod on the last lap to win, beating out Rod's favored fraternity team.

Ray is proud of his son and takes to riding a bicycle himself for his health. Dave enrolls at the university, where he extolls the virtues of the Tour de France and of French cyclists to a pretty French exchange student. His father shows a look of surprise and dismay when Dave says "Bonjour Papa" while bike riding with the French student.

== Cast ==
- Dennis Christopher as Dave Stohler
- Dennis Quaid as Mike
- Daniel Stern as Cyril
- Jackie Earle Haley as Moocher
- Paul Dooley as Ray Stohler, Dave's father
- Barbara Barrie as Evelyn Stohler, Dave's mother
- Robyn Douglass as Katherine
- Hart Bochner as Rod
- P. J. Soles as Suzy (billed as Pamela Jayne Soles)
- Amy Wright as Nancy
- John Ashton as Roy, Mike's older brother

== Production ==
=== Inspiration ===
The bicycling team is based on the 1962 Phi Kappa Psi Little 500 champions, which featured legendary rider and Italian enthusiast Dave Blase, who provided screenwriter and fellow Phi Kappa Psi team member Steve Tesich the inspiration for the main character in the movie. Blase, together with team manager Bob Stohler, provided the name of this character: Dave Stohler. In the 1962 race, Blase rode 139 out of 200 laps and crossed the finish line as the victor, much like the main character in the film. Blase appears in the movie as the race announcer.

The working title of the movie script was Bambino, written in 1978, which originally had Dave's family name as "Blase," which was later changed to "Stohler" for the film.

=== Filming ===
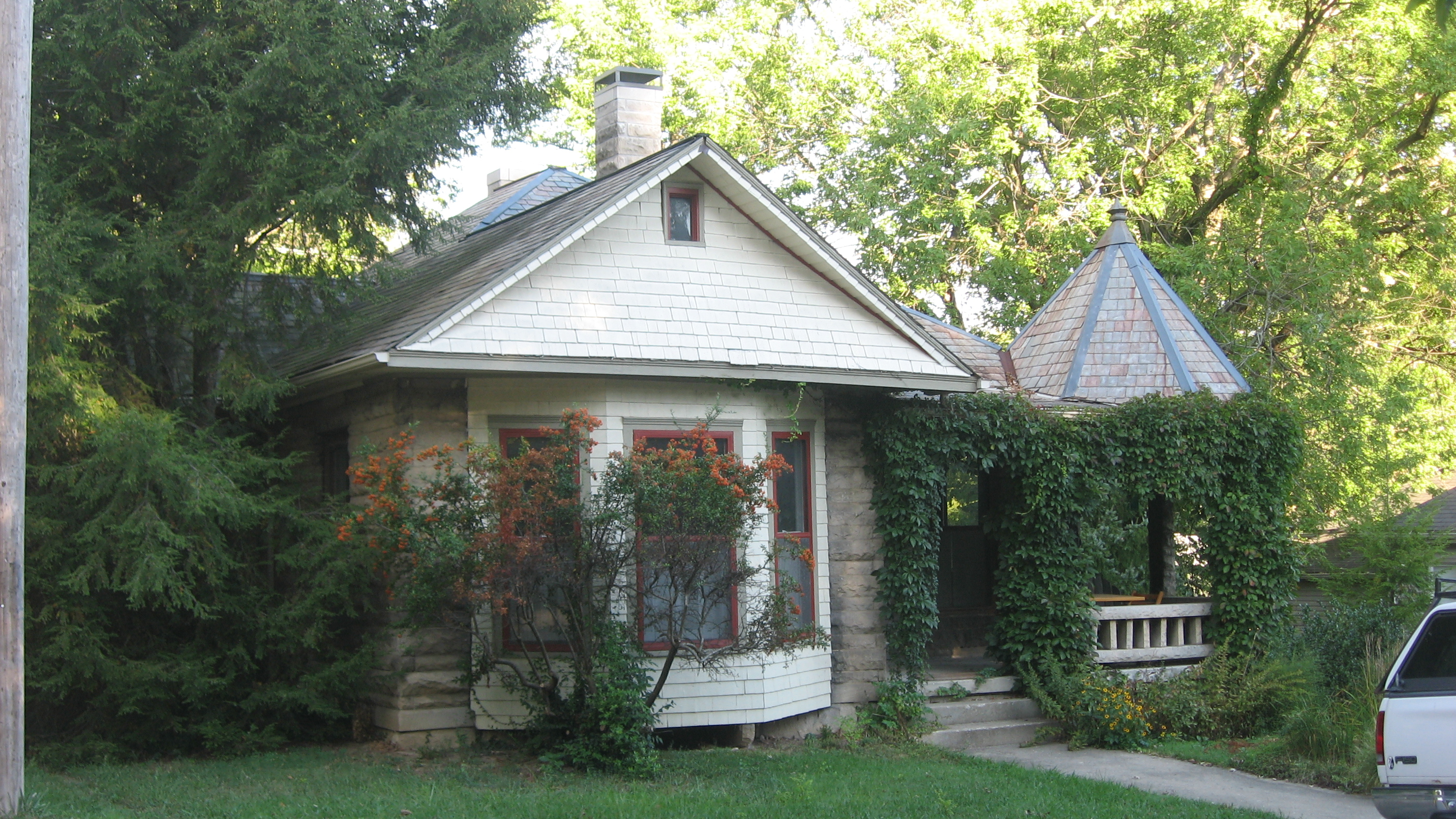
Dave's house

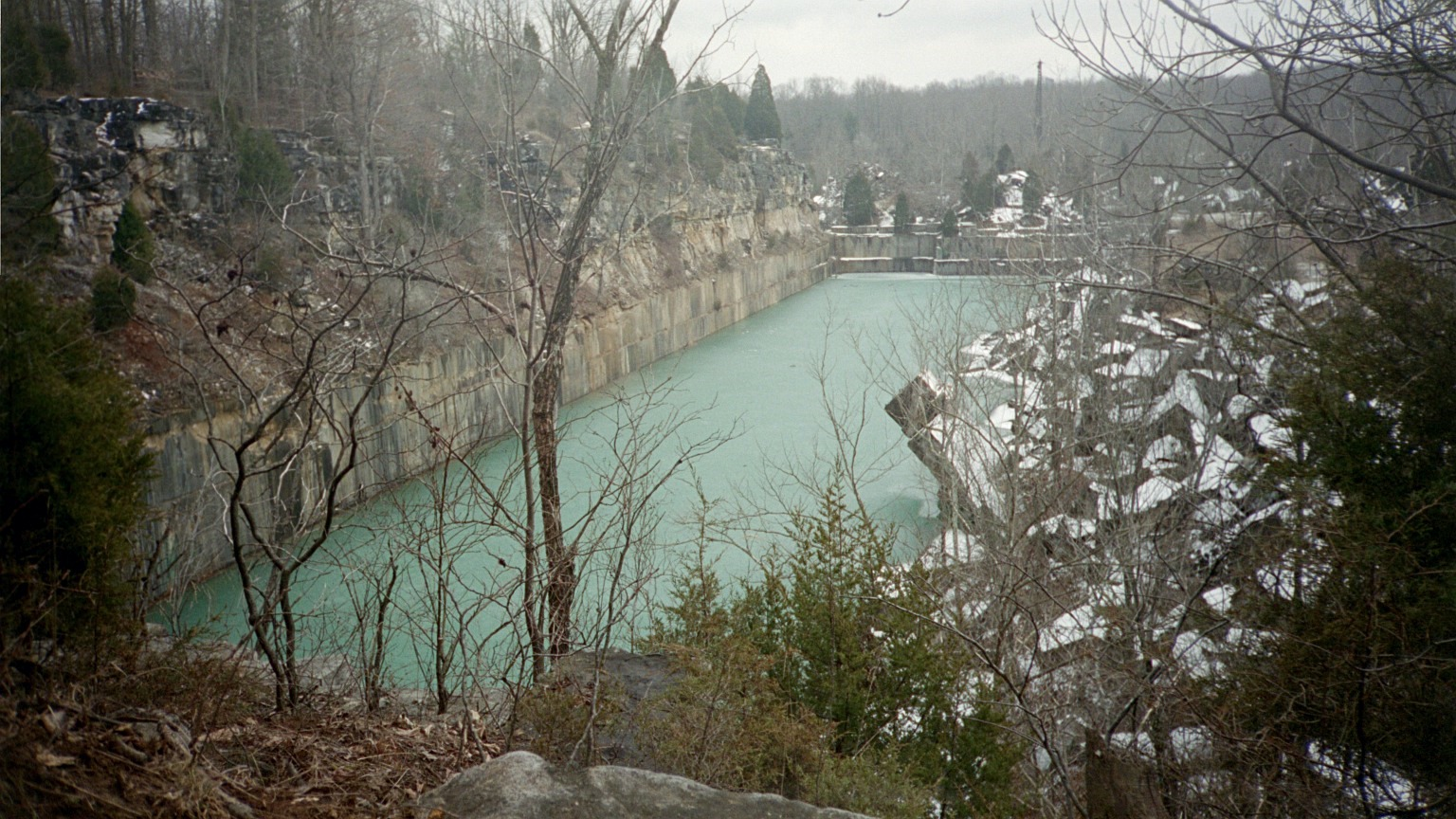
Rooftop Quarry, originally named Sanders Quarry, near Bloomington

Location filming in and around Bloomington took place during the summer of 1978.

The abandoned limestone quarry in which Dave and his friends swam, called Rooftop Quarry by locals, is at the end of East Empire Mill Road, off the old State Road 37, in Perry Township, south of Bloomington.

The four main characters in the film, though meant to be 18 year-olds who had just graduated high school, were played by actors whose ages were considerably diverse. At the time of filming, Dennis Christopher (Dave) was 27, Dennis Quaid (Mike) was 24, Daniel Stern (Cyril) was 20, and Jackie Earle Haley (Moocher) was just 16.

=== Editing ===
Cynthia Scheider, later known for editing such films as The Men's Club, Without a Trace, and the hit Batteries Not Included, got her first job as chief film editor on Breaking Away.

== Release ==
The film opened at the UA Westwood in Westwood, Los Angeles on July 13, 1979 and at the Coronet in New York City on July 18.

== Reception ==
The film received positive reviews upon its release. Roger Ebert called it "a wonderfully sunny, funny, goofy, intelligent movie that makes you feel about as good as any movie in a long time. It is, in fact, a treasure... Movies like this are hardly ever made at all; when they're made this well, they're precious cinematic miracles." The New York Times's Janet Maslin wrote that, even though "the cast is unknown, the director has a spotty history, and the basic premise falls into this year's most hackneyed category ... the finished product is wonderful. Here is a movie so fresh and funny it didn't even need a big budget or a pedigree." A Variety magazine review concluded that "though its plot wins no points for originality, Breaking Away is a thoroughly delightful light comedy, lifted by fine performances from Dennis Christopher and Paul Dooley." Critic Dave Kehr, however, gave a later, somewhat dissenting opinion: "Released at a time when any small-scale film earned critical favor simply by virtue of its unpretentiousness, Breaking Away probably looked better in context than it does now." However, he conceded that "Peter Yates lends the film a fine, unexpected limpidity, and the principals are mostly excellent."

Pauline Kael for The New Yorker wrote that the film was a "graceful, unpredictable comedy that pleases and satisfies audiences."

On review aggregator website Rotten Tomatoes, the film has an approval rating of 95% based on 42 reviews, with a rating average of 8.2/10. The website's critical consensus reads: "At once a touching, funny coming-of-age story and a compelling sports film, Breaking Away is a delightful treat." On Metacritic—which assigns a weighted mean score—the film has a score of 91 out of 100 based on 15 critics, indicating "universal acclaim".

The film grossed approximately $20 million in North America.

The New York Times placed the film on its Best 1000 Movies Ever list.

The February 2020 issue of New York Magazine lists Breaking Away as among "The Best Movies That Lost Best Picture at the Oscars."

NBC paid $5 million to screen the film on television on May 5, 1980, bypassing HBO and significantly shortening the normal window between theatrical release and screening on broadcast television, which was generally three years at the time.

== Accolades ==
Award	Category	Recipient	Result	Ref.
Academy Awards	Best Picture	Peter Yates	Nominated	
Academy Awards	Best Director	Peter Yates	Nominated	
Academy Awards	Best Supporting Actress	Barbara Barrie	Nominated	
Academy Awards	Best Screenplay – Written Directly for the Screen	Steve Tesich	Won	
Academy Awards	Best Original Song Score and Its Adaptation or Adaptation Score	Patrick Williams	Nominated	
British Academy Film Awards	Most Promising Newcomer to Leading Film Roles	Dennis Christopher	Won	
Golden Globe Awards	Best Motion Picture – Musical or Comedy		Won	
Golden Globe Awards	Best Director – Motion Picture	Peter Yates	Nominated	
Golden Globe Awards	Best Screenplay – Motion Picture	Steve Tesich	Nominated	
Golden Globe Awards	New Star of the Year – Actor	Dennis Christopher	Nominated	
National Society of Film Critics Awards	Best Feature		Won	
National Society of Film Critics Awards	Best Screenplay	Steve Tesich	Won	
Writers Guild of America Awards	Best Comedy Written Directly for the Screen	Steve Tesich	Won	
Young Artist Awards	Best Motion Picture Featuring Youth		Nominated	
Young Artist Awards	Best Juvenile Actor in A Motion Picture	Dennis Christopher	Won	
AFI's 10 Top 10	Sports films		8th Place	
AFI's 100 Years...100 Cheers	Most inspiring films of all time		8th Place	

== Legacy ==
A short-lived television series based on the film, also titled Breaking Away, aired in 1980–1981 and starred Shaun Cassidy. Barrie, Haley, and Ashton reprised their roles in the prequel series.

The film inspired the song "One for the Cutters" by The Hold Steady, which appeared on their 2008 album Stay Positive.

The 1992 Bollywood film Jo Jeeta Wohi Sikandar, starring Aamir Khan, has certain similarities to Breaking Away. However, the director, Mansoor Khan, stated that he became aware of Breaking Away only after the likeness had been brought to his attention. Both films have several thematic similarities, including friendship, class barriers, bicycle racing, and parental relationship, but they are distinctly different films, with different narratives, characters, motivations, treatment, and racing rules.

== See also ==
- List of films about bicycles and cycling
