= Robert Benton =

American filmmaker (1932–2025)

- Born: Robert Douglas Benton; September 29, 1932; Dallas, Texas, U.S.
- Died: May 11, 2025 (aged 92); New York City, U.S.
- Occupations: Film director; screenwriter; producer
- Years active: 1967–2007
- Spouse: Sallie Rendig (m. 1964; died 2023)
- Children: 1

Robert Douglas Benton (September 29, 1932 – May 11, 2025) was an American film director and screenwriter. He and David Newman were nominated for the Academy Award for Best Original Screenplay for the 1967 film Bonnie and Clyde. In 1979, he wrote and directed the film Kramer vs. Kramer, winning the Academy Awards for Best Director and Best Adapted Screenplay. He won another Academy Award for Best Original Screenplay for the 1984 film Places in the Heart.

== Early life ==
Benton was born in Dallas, Texas, to Dorothy (née Spaulding) and Ellery Douglass Benton, a telephone company employee. He grew up in Waxahachie, Texas, and attended the University of Texas, graduating in 1953 with a bachelor of fine arts. Benton served two years in the army and then moved to New York City to pursue a master's degree in art history at Columbia University. However, he dropped out after a semester and joined the staff at Esquire magazine.

== Career ==
In 1959, he co-wrote the book The IN and OUT Book with Harvey Schmidt, published by Viking Press. He was the art director at Esquire in the early 1960s.

Benton won the Academy Awards for Best Adapted Screenplay and Best Director for Kramer vs. Kramer (1979) and Best Original Screenplay for Places in the Heart (1984).

Benton garnered three additional Oscar nominations: two for Best Original Screenplay for Bonnie and Clyde (1967) and The Late Show (1977), and one for Best Adapted Screenplay for Nobody's Fool (1994).

He also directed Twilight (1998) and Feast of Love (2007), and co-wrote the screenplays for Superman (1978) and The Ice Harvest (2005).

In 2006, he appeared in the documentary film Wanderlust.

== Personal life and death ==
Benton was married to artist Sallie Rendig, with whom he had a son, from 1964 until her death in 2023.

Benton died at his home in Manhattan on May 11, 2025, at the age of 92.

== Films ==
Year	Title	Director	Writer	Executive Producer
1967	Bonnie and Clyde	No	Yes	No
1970	There Was a Crooked Man...	No	Yes	No
1972	What's Up, Doc?	No	Yes	No
1972	Bad Company	Yes	Yes	No
1977	The Late Show	Yes	Yes	No
1978	Superman	No	Yes	No
1979	Kramer vs. Kramer	Yes	Yes	No
1982	Still of the Night	Yes	Yes	No
1984	Places in the Heart	Yes	Yes	No
1987	Nadine	Yes	Yes	No
1988	The House on Carroll Street	No	No	Yes
1991	Billy Bathgate	Yes	No	No
1994	Nobody's Fool	Yes	Yes	No
1998	Twilight	Yes	Yes	No
2003	The Human Stain	Yes	No	No
2005	The Ice Harvest	No	Yes	Yes
2007	Feast of Love	Yes	No	No

Producer

- A Texas Romance, 1909 (1964) (Short film)

== Theatre ==
Year	Title	Notes
1966	It's a Bird... It's a Plane... It's Superman	Libretto; adaptation in television film (1975)
1969	Oh! Calcutta!	Contribution in libretto; adaptation in theatrical film (1972)

== Awards and nominations ==
Academy Awards

Year	Category	Title	Result
1968	Best Original Screenplay	Bonnie and Clyde	Nominated
1978	Best Original Screenplay	The Late Show	Nominated
1980	Best Director	Kramer vs. Kramer	Won
1980	Best Adapted Screenplay	Kramer vs. Kramer	Won
1985	Best Director	Places in the Heart	Nominated
1985	Best Original Screenplay	Places in the Heart	Won
1995	Best Adapted Screenplay	Nobody's Fool	Nominated

BAFTA Awards

Year	Category	Title	Result
1980	Best Direction	Kramer vs. Kramer	Nominated

Golden Globe Awards

Year	Category	Title	Result
1968	Best Screenplay	Bonnie and Clyde	Nominated
1980	Best Director	Kramer vs. Kramer	Nominated
1980	Best Screenplay	Kramer vs. Kramer	Won
1985	Best Screenplay	Places in the Heart	Nominated

Directors Guild of America

Year	Category	Title	Result
1980	Outstanding Directing	Kramer vs. Kramer	Won
1985	Outstanding Directing	Places in the Heart	Nominated

Berlin International Film Festival

Year	Category	Title	Result
1977	Golden Bear	The Late Show	Nominated
1985	Silver Bear for Best Director	Places in the Heart	Won

Other awards

Year	Award	Category	Title	Result
1978	Edgar Awards	Best Motion Picture Screenplay	The Late Show	Won
1981	César Awards	Best Foreign Film	Kramer vs. Kramer	Nominated
1984	Toronto International Film Festival	People's Choice Award		Won
2007	Writers Guild of America	Laurel Award for Screenwriting Achievement		Won

=== Accolades for Benton's directed features ===
Year	Picture	Academy Awards		BAFTAs		Golden Globes	
Year	Picture	Nominations	Wins	Nominations	Wins	Nominations	Wins
1977	The Late Show	1		1		1	
1979	Kramer vs. Kramer	9	5	6		8	4
1984	Places in the Heart	7	2			3	1
1991	Billy Bathgate					1	
1994	Nobody's Fool	2				1	
Total		19	7	7		14	5

=== Directed Oscar Performances ===
Under Benton's directions, these actors have received Oscar nominations (and wins) for their performances in their respective roles.

Year	Performer	Feature	Result
Academy Award for Best Actor
1980	Dustin Hoffman	Kramer vs. Kramer	Won
1995	Paul Newman	Nobody's Fool	Nominated
Academy Award for Best Actress
1985	Sally Field	Places in the Heart	Won
Academy Award for Best Supporting Actor
1980	Justin Henry	Kramer vs. Kramer	Nominated
1985	John Malkovich	Places in the Heart	Nominated
Academy Award for Best Supporting Actress
1980	Jane Alexander	Kramer vs. Kramer	Nominated
1980	Meryl Streep	Kramer vs. Kramer	Won
1985	Lindsay Crouse	Places in the Heart	Nominated

== Archival sources ==
- The Robert Benton Papers 1969–1994 (24 linear feet) are housed at the Wittliff Collections, Texas State University in San Marcos.
