= 1963 New York Film Critics Circle Awards =

29th New York Film Critics Circle Awards

29th New York Film Critics Circle Awards

January 18, 1964
(announced December 30, 1963)

Tom Jones

The 29th New York Film Critics Circle Awards, honored the best filmmaking of 1963.

== Winners ==
- Best Film:
  - Tom Jones
- Best Actor:
  - Albert Finney - Tom Jones
- Best Actress:
  - Patricia Neal - Hud
- Best Director:
  - Tony Richardson - Tom Jones
- Best Screenplay:
  - Irving Ravetch and Harriet Frank, Jr. - Hud
- Best Foreign Language Film:
  - 8½ • Italy
