= Run for Cover (film) =

1955 film by Nicholas Ray

- Theatrical release poster
- Directed by: Nicholas Ray
- Screenplay by: Winston Miller
- Story by: Harriet Frank, Jr. Irving Ravetch
- Produced by: William H. Pine; William C. Thomas
- Starring: James Cagney; Viveca Lindfors; John Derek; Jean Hersholt; Grant Withers
- Cinematography: Daniel Fapp
- Edited by: Howard Smith
- Music by: Howard Jackson
- Color process: Technicolor
- Production company: Pine-Thomas Productions
- Distributed by: Paramount Pictures
- Release date: May 14, 1955 (United States)
- Running time: 93 minutes
- Country: United States
- Language: English
- Box office: $1.5 million (US)

Run for Cover is a 1955 American Western film directed by Nicholas Ray and starring James Cagney, Viveca Lindfors, John Derek, and in his final film, Jean Hersholt. Distributed by Paramount Pictures, this film was made in VistaVision.

== Plot ==
At a watering hole, Matt Dow meets young cowboy Davey Bishop for the first time. As they take turns shooting at a hawk, a train that has recently been robbed goes by. Mistaking the shooting for another attack by train robbers, the men on the train toss a bag of money toward the two men.

Realizing that a posse will be looking for them, Dow and Bishop head straight to the next town on the line to return the money, but the expecting posse ambushes them before they get there. Bishop is wounded, and taken to the Swenson farm to recover. Once back in town in the sheriff's office, Dow confronts the trainmen and explains what happened. Dow then goes out to the Swenson farm to check on Bishop, and is made welcome by Helga Swenson and her father. The townspeople regret the shooting of Bishop, whose limp will be permanent. Dow accepts a job as sheriff, giving Bishop the job of deputy. Dow begins to spend more and more time with Helga, eventually proposing successfully.

An outlaw named Morgan and another man are spotted planning a bank robbery. The second man is captured, but Morgan escapes. Dow leaves the prisoner with Bishop, and pursues and captures Morgan on his own. On his return to the town, he discovers that Bishop has been scared into turning his prisoner over to a lynch mob. Dow tasks Bishop with taking Morgan to the marshal for his safety, and then proceeds to arrest the lynch mob. The lenient judge, though, only fines the mob $10 each for the lynching. Bishop returns injured and empty-handed, relating that Morgan overpowered him and escaped.

Morgan and some other outlaws, including one named Gentry, return to rob the town's bank, killing Helga's father as they escape. Gentry recognizes Dow, which makes the townsfolk worry that Dow might be in on the robbery. Dow tells them that he shared a prison cell with Gentry for six years, having been unjustly imprisoned in a case of mistaken identity, for which he was finally pardoned. His explanation is accepted with some reservation.

A posse is formed and gives chase, and after a hard fruitless ride takes them into Comanche territory, most of the posse wants to abandon the pursuit. Dow insists on continuing, but all the others turn back, with only Bishop sticking with him. As they continue on, Bishop shoots Dow, injuring his arm. Dow manages to overpower Bishop, who confesses that he was not only in on the robbery, but that he helped plan it. Instead of taking Bishop back, Dow forces him on, and they eventually come across most of the thieves who have been killed by the Comanche and find the money. Dow sets out to capture the survivors, and takes Bishop with him.

Dow and Bishop are trapped by Comanches and hide the money. A wounded Dow tries to make it across a river, but Bishop leaves him to drown. He clings to a log and follows Bishop to some ruins, where he finds him with Morgan. Bishop and Morgan discuss how to get the money back. Dow confronts them and shoots Morgan in self defense. He tells Bishop that he will take him back to town to be hanged, where he will serve as an example to others, the only thing he is good for. Morgan regains consciousness and reaches for his gun. Bishop spots him and shoots, but Dow thinks that Bishop is drawing on him, and shoots Bishop. He realizes that, in the end, Bishop was not beyond redemption.

In the final scene, Dow returns home, giving the recovered money back with "Davey's compliments". Helga asks about Davey, to which Dow replies, "Davey did fine."

== Cast ==
- James Cagney as Matt Dow
- Viveca Lindfors as Helga Swenson
- John Derek as Davey Bishop
- Jean Hersholt as Mr. Swenson
- Grant Withers as Gentry
- Jack Lambert as Larsen
- Ernest Borgnine as Morgan
- Ray Teal as Sheriff
- Irving Bacon as Scotty
- Trevor Bardette as Paulsen
- John Miljan as Mayor Walsh
- Gus Schilling as Doc Ridgeway

== Production ==
The film was based on a story by Harriet Frank Jr. and Irving Ravetch. They were a married couple who worked separately for ten years then decided to collaborate. They worked on a number of stories together, including Run for Cover before becoming established as a major screenwriting team with The Long, Hot Summer (1958). Of Run For Cover, Frank later said "We weren't very picky in those days. What was presented was written."

The movie was made by Pine-Thomas Productions who were best known for their low-budget motion pictures. By 1954 however they had switched to concentrating on "A" movies.

William Dieterle was originally signed to direct. In March 1954, Nicholas Ray signed to direct. It would be Ray's second Western, after Johnny Guitar. James Cagney agreed to star, his first western since The Oklahoma Kid (1939). (Cagney's third and last Western would be Tribute to a Bad Man released in 1956.) John Derek signed to play the second male lead Davey Bishop.

Scenes were filmed at the Durango and Silverton Narrow Gauge Railroad in Colorado and at the Aztec Ruins National Monument in New Mexico. Most of the film was shot in the Four Corners region of those states with some interior shots done at the Paramount Pictures studio in Los Angeles.

== Reception ==
FilmInk wrote "Cagney is always compelling, and Viveca Lindfords [sic] is great; although Derek plays a weak character yet again, the film could've done with a better actor in his part."

== Soundtrack ==
The title song "Run for Cover" featured music by Howard Jackson and lyrics by Jack Brooks.

== See also ==
- List of American films of 1955
