= Michael Frank (writer) =

American writer

Michael Frank is an American writer of fiction and nonfiction. His books include the memoir The Mighty Franks (2018); a novel, What is Missing (2020); and the nonfiction work One Hundred Saturdays (2022).

== Career ==
Frank was a Contributing Writer to the Los Angeles Times Book Review between 1998 and 2004. His short fiction, essays, and articles have appeared in The New York Times, The Atlantic, Tablet, and The Yale Review among other publications. His short story, "My Husband's Best Friend's Second Wife," was presented at Symphony Space's Selected Shorts.

In 2018 Frank published his memoir The Mighty Franks, which describes his troubled relationship with his aunt and uncle, the husband and wife screenwriting team Harriet Frank Jr. and Irving Ravetch. The book received the 2018 Jewish Quarterly-Wingate Prize and was named one of the best books of the year by The New Statesman and The Telegraph. The Atlantic said that in the memoir "Frank brings Proustian acuity and razor-sharp prose to family dramas as primal, and eccentrically insular, as they come." The Times Literary Supplement said of the memoir, that it "may be the first to expose narrative abuse. In The Mighty Franks, [Frank] recalls being imprinted for life by a pair of Los Angeles 'sorcerers', verbal enchanters who immured him within a fairy-tale world."

Frank published a novel, What Is Missing, in 2020, which The New Yorker described as "a penetrating examination of how a life can be defined by contingency and surprise." Frank was also a 2020 Guggenheim Fellow.

In 2022 he published One Hundred Saturdays: Stella Levi and the Search for a Lost World, which tells the story of Frank's six-year-long encounter with Stella Levi, one of last remaining survivors of the Sephardic Jewish community who lived in the Juderia of Rhodes. It featured paintings based on historical photographs by the artist Maira Kalman. Described as "exceptional" by The New York Review of Books, One Hundred Saturdays was named one of the ten best books of 2022 by The Wall Street Journal. The book was shortlisted for the Jewish Quarterly-Wingate Prize and the 2024 Sami Rohr Prize for Jewish Literature; it was selected for a Natan Notable Book Award, received two Jewish Book Council Jewish Book Awards in the categories of Holocaust Memoir and Sephardic Culture, and the American Library Association's Sophy Brody Award for Outstanding Achievement in Jewish Literature.

== Bibliography ==
- The Mighty Franks (2018) Farrar, Straus and Giroux ISBN 9780374537807
- What is Missing (2020) Farrar, Straus and Giroux ISBN 9780374298388
- One Hundred Saturdays (2022) Avid Reader Press, an imprint of Simon and Schuster ISBN 9781982167226
