= The Sound and the Fury (1959 film) =

1959 film by Martin Ritt

- Theatrical release poster
- Directed by: Martin Ritt
- Written by: Harriet Frank Jr. Irving Ravetch
- Based on: The Sound and the Fury (1929 novel) by William Faulkner
- Produced by: Jerry Wald
- Starring: Yul Brynner; Joanne Woodward; Margaret Leighton; Stuart Whitman; Ethel Waters; Jack Warden; Françoise Rosay
- Cinematography: Charles G. Clarke
- Edited by: Stuart Gilmore
- Music by: Alex North
- Distributed by: 20th Century-Fox
- Release date: March 1959 (Los Angeles)
- Running time: 110 minutes
- Country: United States
- Language: English
- Budget: $1,710,000
- Box office: $1.7 million (est. US/Canada rentals)

The Sound and the Fury is a 1959 American drama film directed by Martin Ritt and starring Yul Brynner, Joanne Woodward, Margaret Leighton, Stuart Whitman and Ethel Waters. It is loosely based on the 1929 novel by William Faulkner, and is the second adaptation of a Faulkner work to be directed by Martin Ritt, following the previous year's The Long, Hot Summer. Both films were produced by Jerry Wald, with screenplays written by Irving Ravetch and Harriet Frank Jr..

The Southern Gothic film was released by 20th Century Fox in March 1959. Unlike its predecessor, it was not a great success.

== Plot ==
17-year-old Quentin Compson lives in the small Mississippi town of Jefferson. She lives with her step-uncle, Jason, who has practically raised Quentin ever since her promiscuous mother, Caddy, abandoned her.

Jason makes ends meet working in the store of Earl Snopes, a man he detests. He is the provider for several people in the large family house, including Howard, who is Quentin's uncle, and his step-brother, and a mute, mentally handicapped man named Benjy, his other step-brother. Other occupants include Jason's bitter, resentful mother; Dilsey, a black housekeeper, and Luster, Dilsey's grandson who looks after Benjy.

Quentin is bored, restless, and not interested in Jason's wishes that she continue her education. When a carnival comes to town, she becomes infatuated with Charlie Busch, a carny worker who tries to seduce her.

Caddy returns to town. She has a tentative reunion with Quentin, but takes Jason's side because she has no money and needs him to shelter her now. Caddy flirts with Snopes, who implies that they had intimate relations and is beaten by Jason for saying as much. Benjy becomes incensed when he catches Quentin sneaking out to meet Busch and tries to strangle her, whereupon Jason decides that Benjy must be committed to an institution.

A frustrated Quentin wants to leave with Busch and claims she can get her hands on $3,000. She steals it from a suitcase of money Jason had been saving for her future. To prove the stranger's true intentions, Jason goes to Busch and gives him a choice: the girl or the money. Quentin is crushed when she realizes what Busch is really after. She returns to Jason and promises to be more mature in their future together.

== Cast ==
- Yul Brynner as Jason Compson
- Joanne Woodward as Quentin Compson
- Margaret Leighton as Caddy Compson
- Jack Warden as Benjy Compson
- Stuart Whitman as Charlie Busch
- Ethel Waters as Dilsey
- Françoise Rosay as Mrs Caroline Compson
- John Beal as Howard Compson
- Albert Dekker as Earl Snopes
- Stephen Perry as Luster
- Roy Glenn as Job
- Bill Gunn as T.P.
- Esther Dale as Mrs Maud Mansfield
- Adrienne Marden as Effie Mansfield
- Jean Carson as Mary-Ellen
- Roy Glenn as Job
- Emerson Treacy as Selby

== Production ==
In September 1955, the novel was optioned by Jerry Wald who had a deal at Columbia. The previous month Wald optioned the Faulkner novel Soldiers' Pay. In August 1956, Wald announced he had purchased the screen rights and would make it for 20th Century Fox, and that the husband-and-wife team of Harriet Frank and Irvin Ravitch would do the adaptation. Wald had a tendency to film older novels; he said he took advice from a survey of librarians throughout the country to see what older books were "perennial favorites" with readers. Wald offered the leading roles of Jason and Candace to Laurence Olivier and Vivien Leigh.

In January 1957 Gregory Peck signed to star with filming to begin in June. Audrey Hepburn was sought to co star and Jose Quintero to direct. Quintero turned down the film, By May 1957, Martin Ritt was signed to direct and Wald was going to make another Faulkner tale as well, The Hamlet, which became The Long, Hot Summer. Ritt did it under a two-picture contract with Fox. Eventually, Ritt and Wald filmed Long Hot Summer first.

In December 1957 filming was postponed due to difficulties in casting. Lana Turner was to star as Caddy. In January 1958 Yul Brynner signed to star.

Like The Long Hot Summer, the film was shot in Louisiana, and at the Fox studio in Hollywood.

== Release ==
In October 1958 Wald declared the film would be as popular as Peyton Place.

The film opened at the RKO Pantages Theatre at the end of March 1959 and grossed $13,000 in its first week.

== Reception ==
Compared to its predecessor, the film received lukewarm reviews from critics. The negative reception may also have been partly due to Joanne Woodward's being so much older than the character she played; at almost 30 years old, it was hard to find her believable as a 17-year-old girl.

Bosley Crowther of The New York Times wrote that the film "lacks texture" and is "sentiment-dappled and synthetic".

Clyde Gilmour of Maclean's wrote "The screen edition of the William Faulkner novel is crammed with hifalutin "significance" which somehow never comes into sharp focus."

Filmink called it "dreadful, over acted."

In a mixed review, Manny Farber of The New Leader wrote "In many ways, Sound is a bad joke... everything outside the story is sharply etched and fairly gripping for an opulent movie."

In a positive review, George Bourke of the Miami Herald wrote "the whole cast is magnificent and the color production rates top credits."

== See also ==
- List of American films of 1959
