= Murphy's Romance =

1985 film by Martin Ritt

- Theatrical release poster
- Directed by: Martin Ritt
- Screenplay by: Harriet Frank Jr. Irving Ravetch
- Based on: Murphy's Romance (1980 novella) by Max Schott
- Produced by: Laura Ziskin
- Starring: Sally Field; James Garner; Brian Kerwin; Corey Haim
- Cinematography: William A. Fraker
- Edited by: Sidney Levin
- Music by: Carole King
- Production company: Fogwood Films
- Distributed by: Columbia Pictures
- Release date: December 25, 1985
- Running time: 107 minutes
- Country: United States
- Language: English

Murphy's Romance is a 1985 American romantic-comedy film directed by Martin Ritt, and starring stars Sally Field, James Garner, Brian Kerwin, and Corey Haim. The screenplay by Harriet Frank Jr. and Irving Ravetch was based on the 1980 novella by Max Schott. The film was produced by Laura Ziskin for Field's production company Fogwood Films. The plot is about a single mother (Field) who moves to a town in rural Arizona, and gets caught in a love triangle between a middle-aged widower (Garner) and her ex-husband (Kerwin).

The film received positive reviews, with James Garner earning an Academy Award nomination for Best Actor, the only Oscar nomination of his career. Murphy's Romance also received Golden Globe nominations for Best Actress in a Motion Picture – Musical or Comedy (Field) and Best Actor in a Motion Picture – Musical or Comedy (Garner).

== Plot ==
Emma Moriarty, a 33 year-old divorced mother, moves to a rural Arizona town to make a living by training and boarding horses. She becomes friends with the town's pharmacist, Murphy Jones, an idiosyncratic widower. A romance between them seems unlikely, both because of the significant age difference and because Emma allows her ex-husband, Bobby Jack Moriarty, to move back in with her and their 12-year-old son, Jake.

Emma struggles to make ends meet but is helped by Murphy. While not helping her outright with charity or a personal loan, Murphy gives a part-time job to Jake and buys a horse with her assistance boarding it. He encourages others to do the same, and eventually Emma's business grows. He also provides emotional support for both her and Jake, especially when Emma is injured in a car accident. Murphy spends quite a bit of time with Emma because of his horse being boarded at her place and a connection forms.

A rivalry develops between Murphy and Bobby Jack, who is immature, dishonest and jealous; Emma and Murphy fall in love despite Bobby Jack's efforts to hamper their romance. Bobby Jack finally leaves town after an 18-year-old he had a fling with appears at the ranch with their newborn twin sons. With him gone, Murphy and Emma are finally free to pursue a relationship.

== Cast ==
- Sally Field as Emma Moriarty
- James Garner as Murphy Jones
- Brian Kerwin as Bobby Jack Moriarty
- Corey Haim as Jake Moriarty
- Dennis Burkley as Freeman Coverly
- Carole King as Tillie
- Georgann Johnson as Margaret
- Dortha Duckworth as Bessie
- Michael Prokopuk as Albert
- Billy Ray Sharkey as Larry Le Beau
- Michael Crabtree as Jim Forrest
- Anna Levine as Wanda
- Charles Lane as Amos Abbott
- Bruce French as Rex Boyd
- John C. Becher as Jesse Parker
- Henry Slate as Fred Hite

== Production ==
=== Development ===
Columbia did not want to make the picture at all because it had no "sex or violence" in it. However, Columbia agreed because of the success of Norma Rae (1979), with the same star (Field), director, and screenwriting team (Harriet Frank Jr. and Irving Ravetch), and with Field's new production company Fogwood Films producing. Columbia then wanted Marlon Brando, or someone with "greater box-office allure", to play the part of Murphy. Field and Ritt fought Columbia to cast Garner, whom the studio viewed at that point as primarily a television actor, despite having enjoyed a flourishing film career in the 1950s and 60s and having co-starred in the box-office hit Victor/Victoria in 1982.

When Ritt gave the Max Schott story to Harriet Frank Jr. and Irving Ravetch, the same married screenplay team that worked on Hud (1963) with Ritt and Paul Newman, they wanted Newman to be in Murphy's Romance. Field had worked successfully with Newman in 1981's Absence of Malice, but Newman declined the project, and Garner was the only other actor that Ritt and Field had asked.

The screenplay is very different from the Max Schott novella. In the Schott story, Murphy and Emma stay just platonic friends. Murphy marries someone else, and then tries to find Emma a suitable husband.

=== Filming ===
On the A&E television program Biography of Garner, "James Garner: Hollywood Maverick", Field reported that her on-screen kiss with Garner was the best cinematic kiss she had experienced.

Part of the deal from the studio, which at that time was owned by The Coca-Cola Company, included an eight-line sequence of Field and Garner saying the word "Coke", and having Coke products and signs appear prominently in the film.

== Release ==
The film was scheduled for general release during the weekend for 1985 Christmas Day, but Columbia moved it to the weekends of January 17 and January 31, 1986, to avoid competing with the holiday lineup of films. It did a limited, selected, release for the film on December 25, 1985, so that it would qualify for that year's Academy Awards.

=== Home media ===
The film was one of the final titles to be released on the now defunct CED Videodisc format in 1986.

== Soundtrack ==
The film's theme song, "Love for the Last Time", is performed by Carole King.

== Reception ==
=== Critical response ===
Reviews were generally favorable. Film critic Roger Ebert gave the film 3 stars (out of 4), stating "Much depends on exactly what Emma and Murphy say to each other, and how they say it, and what they don't say. The movie gets it all right." The film holds a rating of 74% on review-aggregation website Rotten Tomatoes, based on 27 reviews.

=== Awards and honors ===
Murphy's Romance received Academy Award nominations for Best Actor in a Leading Role (James Garner) and for Best Cinematography (William A. Fraker). It also received Golden Globe nominations for Best Actress in a Motion Picture – Musical or Comedy (Sally Field) and Best Actor in a Motion Picture – Musical or Comedy (Garner).
