= The Cowboys =

1972 film by Mark Rydell

- Theatrical release poster
- Directed by: Mark Rydell
- Screenplay by: Irving Ravetch; Harriet Frank Jr.; William Dale Jennings
- Based on: The Cowboys; 1971 novel by William Dale Jennings
- Produced by: Mark Rydell
- Starring: John Wayne; Roscoe Lee Browne; Bruce Dern; Colleen Dewhurst
- Cinematography: Robert L. Surtees
- Edited by: Neil Travis
- Music by: John Williams
- Distributed by: Warner Bros.
- Release date: January 13, 1972
- Running time: 129 minutes
- Country: United States
- Language: English
- Budget: $6 million
- Box office: $19.2 million

The Cowboys is a 1972 American Western film starring John Wayne, Roscoe Lee Browne, and Bruce Dern, and featuring Colleen Dewhurst and Slim Pickens. It was the feature-film debut of Robert Carradine. Based on the 1971 novel of the same name by William Dale Jennings, the screenplay was written by Irving Ravetch, Harriet Frank Jr., and Jennings and was directed by Mark Rydell.

== Plot ==
In 1877 Montana, aging rancher Wil Andersen needs replacement drovers for a 400-mile (640 km) cattle drive after his ranch hands depart for the gold rush. Andersen rides to Bozeman to hire more hands, but most men there also have left. Andersen's friend Anse Peterson suggests hiring local schoolboys, though Andersen is skeptical they could handle the job.

The next morning, the boys arrive at Andersen's ranch to volunteer for the drive. Andersen then assesses their horseback riding ability. The eldest boy, Cimarron, gets into a fight with Slim, the next-oldest. Andersen hires the boys, though he fires Cimarron after the young man pulls a knife on Slim during another fight.

Andersen locks up the boys' guns in a box to be kept on the chuckwagon during the drive. While the boys practice roping, branding, and herding livestock, a suspicious band of men arrives asking for work. Andersen catches their leader Asa Watts in a lie and declines to hire them.

When Jebediah Nightlinger, a black cook, arrives, Andersen's crew is complete. Once on the trail, Andersen notices Cimarron is following the herd. When Slim slips off his horse while crossing a river, Cimarron saves him from drowning. Andersen lets Cimarron join the drive.

Slowly, the boys become good cowhands, impressing Andersen and Nightlinger. When Dan, who wears glasses, is chasing a stray horse, he stumbles upon Watts and his gang, who are cattle rustlers. Watts reveals they have been trailing the herd. He releases Dan, but threatens to slit the boy's throat if he says anything to Andersen.

Dan returns to the herd, though is too terrified to keep watch by himself. Charlie Schwartz agrees to accompany him. When Dan drops his glasses into the ravine where the cattle are resting, Charlie succeeds in retrieving them, but is trampled by the herd. The boys hold a funeral for him before resuming the drive.

When the chuckwagon throws a wheel, Nightlinger and Homer remain behind to make repairs, while the crew moves on. Watts and his gang appear and openly parallel the herd. Andersen sends Weedy to tell Nightlinger to rejoin them as fast as possible. When the rustlers approach, Andersen tells the boys not to resist. Dan tells Andersen about Watts following them, but he was too scared to tell; Andersen comforts him.

Watts and his gang surround the camp. They deliver a battered Weedy, and Watts forces Andersen to surrender his gun. Andersen challenges Watts when he taunts Dan and crushes his glasses. A fistfight ensues between Andersen and Watts, with Andersen prevailing. As he walks away, Watts shoots Andersen, mortally wounding him. The boys remain passive, as instructed, as the rustlers steal the herd.

Nightlinger and Homer reach the group the next morning and find the boys tending Andersen, who is near death. Andersen instructs Nightlinger to take the boys home, and in his final moments, he says how proud he is of them.

After burying Andersen, the boys seize the firearms stored in the chuckwagon, intending to avenge Andersen's death. When they catch up to the rustlers, Nightlinger helps to form a plan. The boys silently kill three outlaws. Nightlinger draws out Watts and the remaining gang into an ambush. Riding in among stampeding horses, the boys kill everyone except Watts, who is pinned under a fallen horse. Watts' leg is broken and his foot is entangled in a rope. Dan cuts the reins so the horse can get up, and Cimarron spooks it, dragging Watts to death.

Once the drive reaches Belle Fourche, South Dakota, the boys sell the cattle and hire a stonemason to carve a gravestone with Andersen's name and the inscription, "Beloved Husband and Father", honoring Andersen's paternal role in their lives. The marker is placed in the approximate location of Andersen's grave. The boys head home, accompanied by Nightlinger.

== Cast ==
- John Wayne as Wil Andersen
- Roscoe Lee Browne as Jebediah Nightlinger, the cook
- Bruce Dern as Asa Watts, aka Long Hair
- Colleen Dewhurst as Kate Collingwood, a traveling madam
- Slim Pickens as Anse Peterson, Wil Andersen's friend
- Lonny Chapman as Homer's Father
- Charles Tyner as Stonemason
- Sarah Cunningham as Annie Andersen, Wil's wife
- Allyn Ann McLerie as Ellen Price, a teacher
- Matt Clark as Smiley, a ranch hand
- Maggie Costain as Phoebe, a prostitute
- The Cowboys
  - Alfred Barker Jr. as Clyde "Fats" Potter
  - Nicolas Beauvy as Dan
  - Steve Benedict as Steve
  - Robert Carradine as Slim Honeycutt
  - Norman Howell Jr. as Weedy
  - Stephen Hudis as Charlie Schwartz
  - Sean Kelly as "Stuttering" Bob Wilson
  - A Martinez as Cimarron
  - Clay O'Brien as Hardy Fimps
  - Sam O'Brien as Jimmy Phillips
  - Mike Pyeatt as Homer Weems
- Dick Farnsworth as Henry Williams
- Larry Finley as Jake
- Rustlers
  - Tap Canutt
  - Chuck Courtney
  - Gary Epper
  - Tony Epper

== Production ==
Robert Carradine made his feature-film debut in the film, as did fellow child actor Stephen Hudis. The production was filmed at various locations in New Mexico and Colorado, as well as at Warner Bros. Studio in Burbank, California.

== Reception ==
The Cowboys was a box-office hit, but with somewhat mixed reviews from critics of the day. As for recent reviews, on Rotten Tomatoes, it has an approval rating of 80% based on reviews from 15 critics, with an average score of 7.00/10, while on Metacritic, it has a score of 52/100 based on reviews from seven critics. The film received praise for its musical score, the original plot, and John Wayne's performance, but several critics debated the film's implication that boys become men or confirm their manhood through acts of violence and vengeance; Jay Cocks of TIME and Pauline Kael of The New Yorker were especially critical of this aspect of the film.

Writing about The Cowboys, film historian Emanuel Levy noted that Wayne frequently appeared in father-like roles throughout his career:

Aware of his repetitive screen roles as a paternal figure, [Wayne] said the movie was based on a formula that worked in Goodbye Mr. Chips and Sands of Iwo Jima. In all three films, an adult takes a group of young men and initiates them into manhood by instructing them the "right" skills and values. Wayne did not hesitate to appear in The Cowboys, despite the fact that "no actor in his right mind, would try to match the antics of eleven kids on screen," but for him it became "the greatest experience of my life."

One of the scenes in the movie, Dern's shooting of John Wayne, had a notable effect on Dern's career, leading him to be typecast as a villain and psychotic for much of his career. In a 2015 interview, Dern said that for years, he received hate mail because of the scene and that Wayne had told him in advance of the film's release, "When this picture comes out, and audiences see you kill me, they're going to hate you for this."

The film won the Bronze Wrangler Award for Best Theatrical Motion Picture at the Western Heritage Awards.

== Television adaptation ==
In 1974, Warner Bros. developed The Cowboys as a television series for ABC starring Jim Davis, Diana Douglas, and Moses Gunn. David Dortort, best known for Bonanza, The High Chaparral, and The Restless Gun, produced the series. A Martinez, Robert Carradine, Sean Kelly, and Clay O'Brien were all in both the film and the television series, though only Martinez and Carradine played the same character in each project. At the last moment, ABC decided to reduce the show's runtime from an hour to 30 minutes, which, given the show's large cast, made telling stories effectively more difficuly. Only 13 episodes were filmed before the series was cancelled.

== See also ==
- List of American films of 1972
