= Hud (1963 film) =

American film directed by Martin Ritt

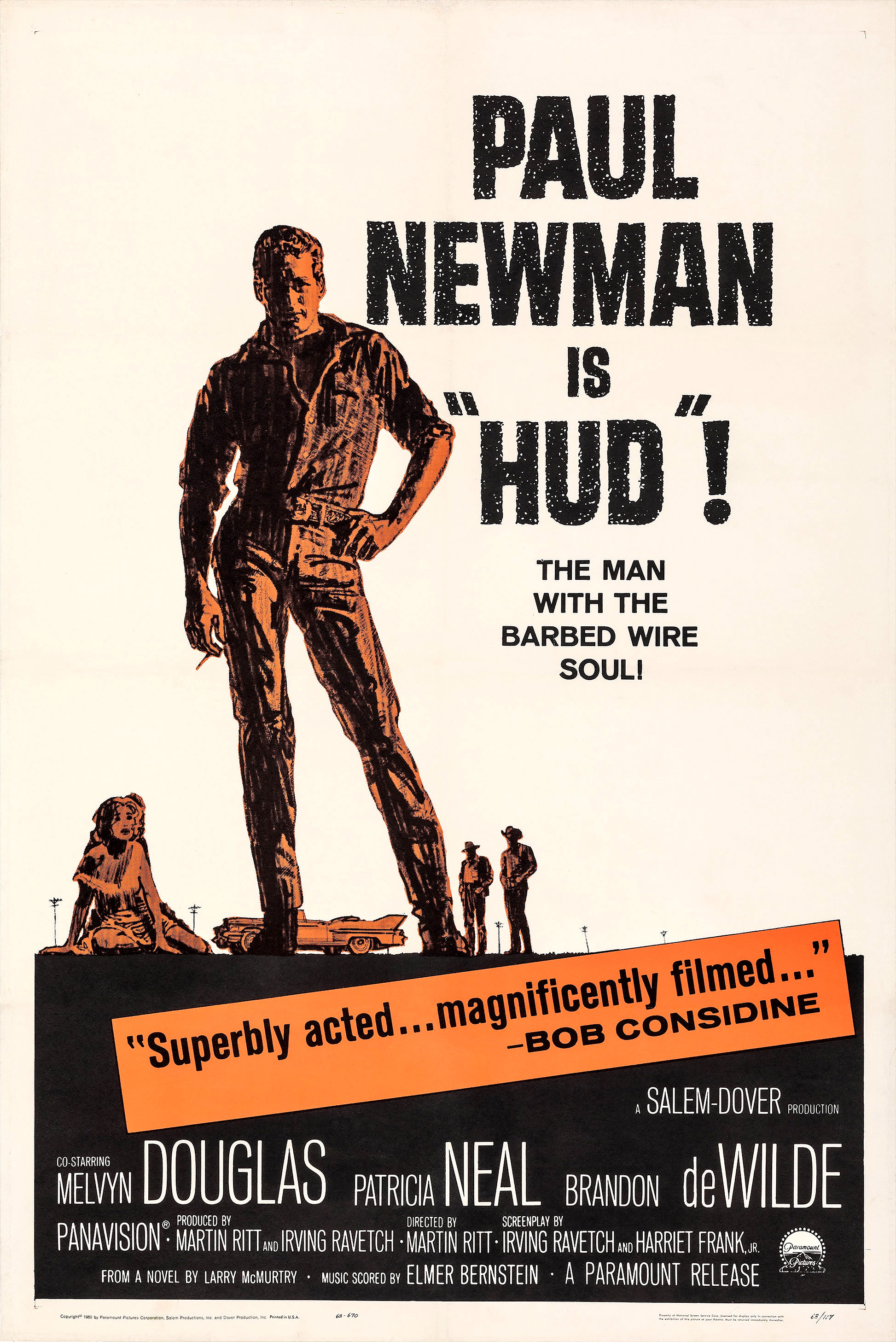
- Theatrical release poster by Mitchell Hooks
- Directed by: Martin Ritt
- Screenplay by: Irving Ravetch; Harriet Frank Jr.
- Based on: Horseman, Pass By (1961 novel) by Larry McMurtry
- Produced by: Irving Ravetch; Martin Ritt
- Starring: Paul Newman; Melvyn Douglas; Patricia Neal; Brandon deWilde
- Cinematography: James Wong Howe
- Edited by: Frank Bracht
- Music by: Elmer Bernstein
- Production company: Salem-Dover Productions
- Distributed by: Paramount Pictures
- Release date: May 29, 1963
- Running time: 112 minutes
- Country: United States
- Language: English
- Budget: $2,400,000
- Box office: $10 million

Hud is a 1963 American contemporary Western film directed and produced by Martin Ritt, and starring Paul Newman, Melvyn Douglas, Brandon deWilde, and Patricia Neal. It was produced by Ritt and Newman's recently founded company, Salem Productions, and was their first film for Paramount Pictures. Its screenplay was by Irving Ravetch and Harriet Frank Jr. and was based on Larry McMurtry's 1961 novel, Horseman, Pass By. The film's title character, Hud Bannon, was a minor character in the original screenplay, but was reworked as the lead role. With its main character an antihero, Hud was later described as a revisionist Western.

Hud was shot on location on the Texas Panhandle, including Claude, Texas. The story centers on the ongoing conflict between Homer Bannon (Douglas), an elderly, principled cattle rancher and Hud (Newman), his arrogant and unscrupulous son, during an outbreak of foot-and-mouth disease which puts the family's ranch at risk. Lonnie (deWilde), Homer's grandson and Hud's nephew, is caught in the center of the conflict and forced to choose which character to follow.

Hud premiered at the Venice International Film Festival, and was a critical and commercial success at its general release. It was nominated for seven Academy Awards, winning three; Patricia Neal won Best Actress, Melvyn Douglas won Best Supporting Actor, and James Wong Howe the Academy Award for Best Black and White Cinematography. Howe's use of contrast to create space and his selection of black-and-white was acclaimed by critics. In later reviews, the film received additional praise. In 2018, the film was selected for preservation in the National Film Registry by the Library of Congress.

== Plot ==
Hud is the ambitious, self-centered son of deeply principled Texas rancher Homer Bannon. Lonnie, teenaged orphan son of Hud's elder brother Norman, looks up to both men, but is most impressed by Hud. Both young men are attracted to the Bannons' earthy housekeeper, Alma. Although she finds Hud physically attractive, Alma keeps her distance because she has been mistreated in the past by self-centered men.

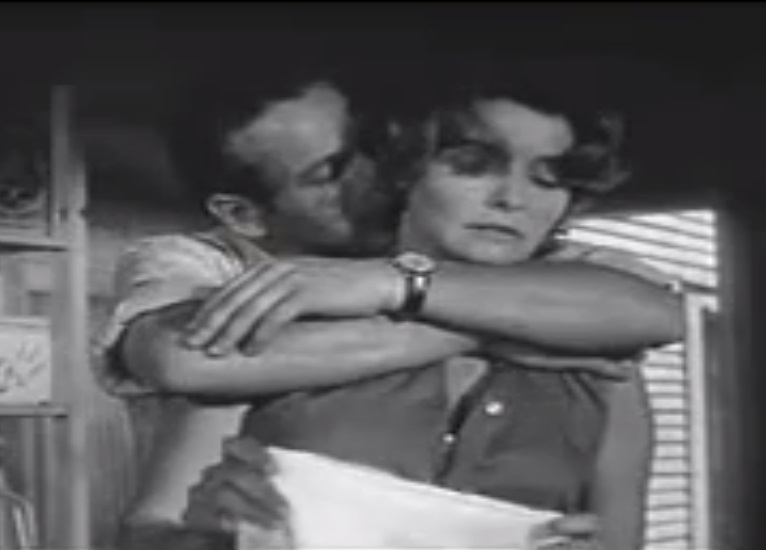
Hud (Paul Newman) "courts" Alma (Patricia Neal)

After one of their cows suddenly dies, Homer sends Lonnie to town to bring Hud to the ranch for his opinion. Lonnie finds Hud, only to have his wastrel uncle shift the blame onto him for his tryst with a married woman. Back at the ranch, Hud drives over Alma's flowers. He shoots several buzzards to scare the flock away from the dead cow, against his father's protestations that they keep the land clean and killing them is illegal. True to form, Hud claims immunity to laws that inconvenience him. Hud is annoyed by his father's decision to summon the state veterinarian, pushing for unloading the cattle to unsuspecting neighbors before the news spreads; otherwise, government agents will kill the entire herd and destroy everything they have worked for. He blames his father for not realizing that the Mexican herd he recently purchased was sick before he bought them. Homer is revolted by Hud's suggestions. After a quick inspection the veterinarian immediately quarantines the ranch for a possible outbreak of foot-and-mouth disease. Aware that a positive test may cost him everything, Homer nevertheless complies.

One night Hud takes Lonnie out drinking, with the pair proving a successful tag-team in a barroom brawl. Back at the ranch Hud regales how he and Lonnie's father did the same thing as kids, revealing in a rare unguarded moment his role in the death of his brother while driving recklessly and his father's antipathy toward him. When they enter the house, Homer confronts Hud, accusing him of trying to corrupt Lonnie. They argue, with Hud accusing Homer of hypocrisy and resentment of him for causing Norman's death. Homer replies that his disappointment in Hud began long before that, over his caring for no one and nothing but himself. Hurt and angry, Hud retorts that his Mama loved him, but she died. When Lonnie tells Homer that he was too hard on Hud and other people behave like him, Homer replies that one day Lonnie will have to decide for himself what is right and wrong.

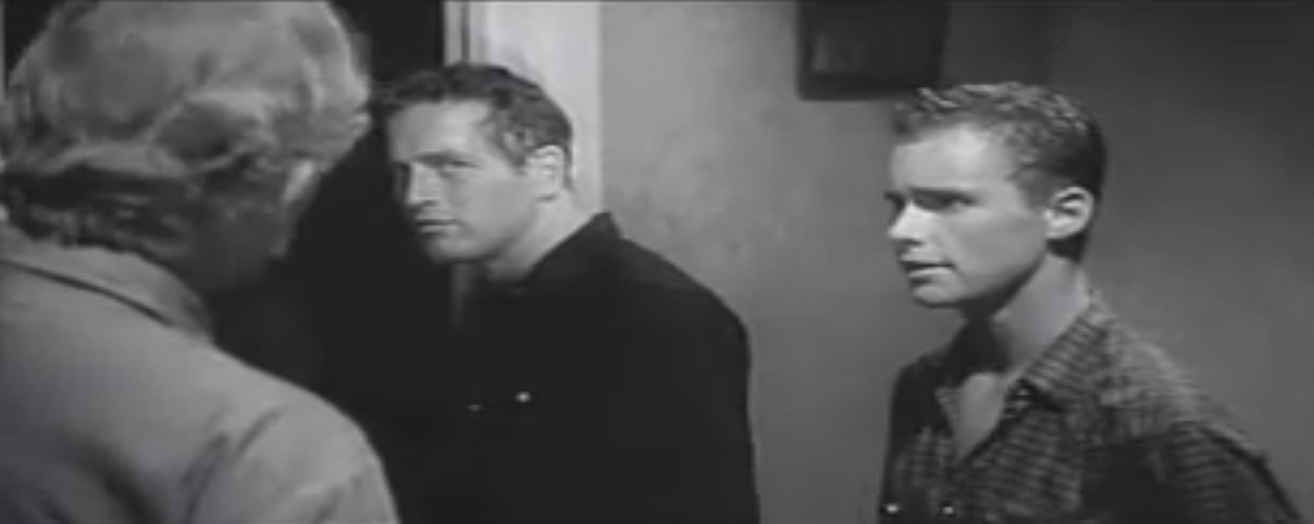
Homer (Melvyn Douglas) confronts Hud, as Lonnie (Brandon deWilde) looks on

After learning from Lonnie that Hud is trying to have him declared incompetent and seize the ranch, Homer confronts a drunken Hud. Homer asserts he will lose. He admits that he made mistakes raising Hud, and was too hard on him. When Hud accuses him of having a "shape up or ship out" policy, Homer wonders aloud how a man like Hud can be his son and storms off to his room. Hud, drunk and angry, goes to Alma's room and attempts to rape her before Lonnie comes to her aid.

When the Bannons' herd tests positive for foot-and-mouth, the veterinarian orders it to be destroyed and buried on the ranch under state supervision to keep the disease from spreading. Hud suggests selling some leases to drill for untapped oil on their land to keep the ranch profitable, but Homer refuses, stating he only has pride in what he earns through hard work with his own hands.

After the cattle have been killed, the state veterinarian and his assistant drive up to the ranch and notice that two Longhorns are still alive, a single pair of a dying breed Homer keeps for sentimental reasons. The assistant gets his rifle, with the intention of killing them. Homer stops him and tells him he will take care of it himself. The assistant curtly expresses doubts Homer will be able to go through with it. Hud soundly defends his father's word, snapping, "He just said he would."

Having had her fill of drama, Alma decides to leave the ranch. After Lonnie drops her off at the bus stop, Hud sees her waiting. He apologizes for his drunken behavior, but not for his attraction to her, saying he would remember her as "the one who got away". Driving back to the ranch Lonnie finds his grandfather lying on the side of the road, having fallen from his horse while surveying the ranch. Hud drives up, but despite their efforts Homer dies.

Lonnie is disgusted by Hud's treatment of Homer and Alma and pulls stakes after his grandfather's funeral, uncertain if he will ever return. After Lonnie tells his uncle to put his half of their inheritance in the bank, Hud replies that Lonnie now sees him as Homer did. As Lonnie walks away, Hud, now alone, retreats into the family house.

== Cast ==
- Paul Newman as Hud Bannon
- Melvyn Douglas as Homer Bannon
- Brandon deWilde as Lonnie Bannon
- Patricia Neal as Alma Brown
- Whit Bissell as Mr. Burris
- Crahan Denton as Jesse
- John Ashley as Hermy
- Val Avery as Jose
- George Petrie as Joe Scanlon
- Curt Conway as Truman Peters
- Sheldon Allman as Mr. Thompson
- Pitt Herbert as Mr. Larker
- Carl Low as Mr. Kirby
- Robert Hinkle as Radio Announcer Frank
- Don Kennedy as Charlie Tucker
- Sharyn Hillyer as Myra
- Yvette Vickers as Lily Peters

== Production ==
=== Development ===
After working together on other projects, director Martin Ritt and Paul Newman co-founded Salem Productions and the company made a three-film deal with Paramount Studios. For its first film, Salem hired husband-and-wife scriptwriters Irving Ravetch and Harriet Frank Jr., who had worked with Ritt and Newman on The Long, Hot Summer. Ravetch found Larry McMurtry's novel, Horseman, Pass By, in an airport shop during a Dallas stopover and presented the project to Ritt and Newman after reading a description of Hud Bannon. The partners met Ravetch and Frank at their home, approved the project, and the writers adapted the script.

Although McMurtry's novel focuses on Lonnie Bannon, Ravetch and Frank expanded Hud's character to the lead role. Ritt wanted Hud to be an antihero who did not regret his actions at the end of the film. He was changed from Homer's stepson to his son, and the character of Homer's wife was eliminated. Newman and Ritt initially named the project Wild Desire, followed by The Winners, Hud Bannon Against the World, Hud Bannon and finally Hud. Ravetch and Frank accompanied Ritt and Newman through preproduction, casting, and publicity design.

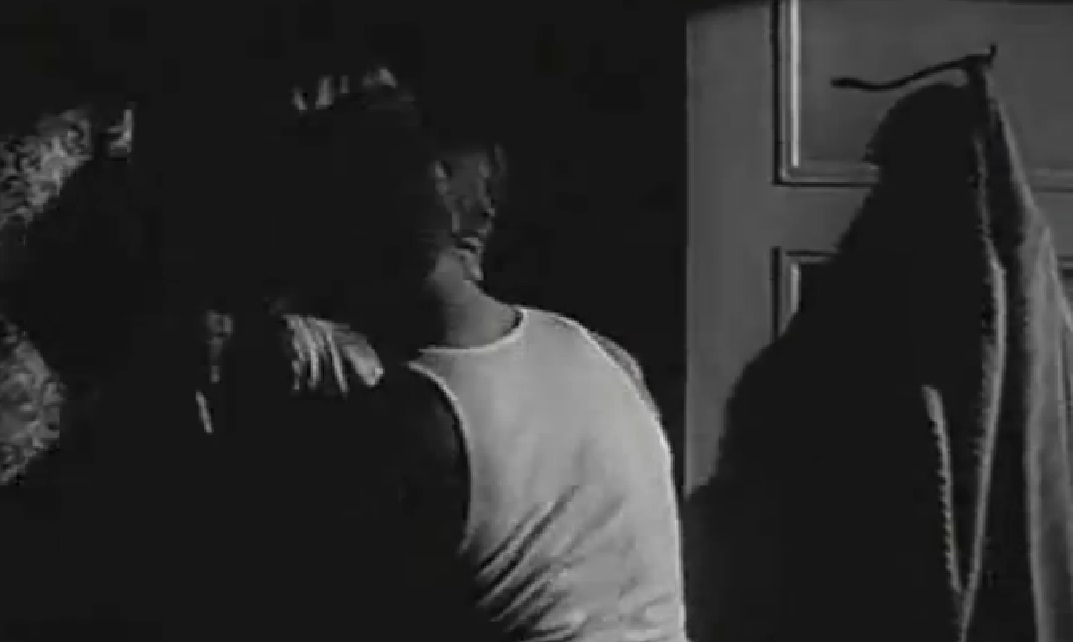
Hud tries to rape Alma

Ritt asked that the housekeeper character (originally Halmea, a black woman) be renamed Alma and played by a white actress, because he thought a relationship between Hud and a black woman would not work. According to Ravetch and Frank, "Neither American Western film nor American society was quite ready for that back then." Although Halmea is assaulted by Hud in the novel, Ravetch and Frank added Lonnie's intervention to "highlight" his significance and keep Hud "human" and not "totally and simplistically evil." To accentuate the scene's violence, Hud's roughness was complemented by the use of shadows, while a camera was attached on Newman's back to create a "man's view angle" while he chased Neal. Film critic Pauline Kael described Neal's performance as "perhaps the first female equivalent of the white-negro."

Cinematographer James Wong Howe shot Hud in black-and-white to "elevate its dramatic propensities." Filmed in Panavision, Howe used high contrast with unbalanced light and dark tones. He highlighted the white ground and clear skies, making the shadows black. Dark tones were "overpowered" by light ones, creating a sense of "infinite space." For faces and structures, Howe used light reflected from the ground. The contrast between the environment and objects silhouetted against the background provides a sense of depth. Ritt's biographer, Carlton Jackson, wrote that in Hud "the scenery becomes a part of the thematic development itself." According to Texas Monthly, "Howe's austere rendition of Texas landscapes [...] remains one of the film's most distinctive pleasures."

Bob Hinkle later recalled: "Ritt would tell him what he wanted: 'I'd like to do this....' And then Howe would say, 'Let me put this kind of lens on it, and we'll shoot it from right here...Then I can hold this windmill in the background.' Something like that to give it an extra something, instead of a tree or a bush."

=== Casting ===
Paul Newman worked for 10 days on a Texas ranch, sleeping in a bunkhouse. For his Texas accent, he was coached by Bob Hinkle, who coached James Dean for his role as Jett Rink in Giant. Although Paramount was doubtful about casting Melvyn Douglas due to his heart condition, Martin Ritt insisted that he was the right actor for the role. Brandon deWilde was a former child actor best known at the time for his award-winning role in Shane. Ritt decided to cast Patricia Neal (whom he had met at the Actors Studio) when he was impressed by her performance in The Untouchables episode "The Maggie Storm Story". The actress signed for $30,000; although she had third billing and 22 minutes of screen time. The film and her Academy Award-winning performance in it had a major impact on her career.

=== Filming ===
Hud was shot over a four-week period in and around the Texas Panhandle, using the town of Claude as a setting. Location filming began on May 21, 1962, and was finished by the second week of June. Outdoor scenes were filmed at the Goodnight Ranch. To avoid surpassing the shooting schedule due to weather conditions, the cast had to cancel two scenes originally planned for the location that featured people from Claude and Amarillo. The rest of the scenes were shot at the Paramount sound stages in Hollywood beginning in the first week of July. The film was completed on August 1, 1962. The pig-scramble scene, written by dialect coach Bob Hinkle, replaced a softball game in Ravetch and Frank's script; Hinkle played the announcer in the scene. For the filming of the cattle-slaughter scene, the Humane Society was present to monitor the animals' treatment. The herd was sprayed with a substance to make it appear ill, and bungee cords were tied to the cattle's legs. Camera angles were arranged by Ritt and Howe to avoid showing the death of the cattle. When a man was shown shooting, the camera would switch to the cattle; the crew shook the cords, creating an effect of the herd being shot. During location shooting, Newman and deWilde often changed hotel rooms due to female fans following them.

Elmer Bernstein used sparse arrangements for Hud's score; in its theme, Bernstein "insinuated" natural sounds with "poignant strings on the guitar." Variety called the theme "vital and noteworthy," "sombre, plaintive and foreboding."

John Ashley had a role, but it was mostly removed during the edit process.

Hud's budget was $2.35 million, and Paramount executives were unhappy with the film. They felt it was too dark and were displeased by the black-and-white cinematography and Hud's lack of remorse and unchanged behavior. Although Martin Rackin asked Ritt to change the film's ending, Newman and he decided to keep the original. After Hud was previewed, Paramount considered dropping the project, feeling that it was not "commercial enough," but Ritt flew to New York and convinced the executives to release the film unmodified. Advertising posters, with Newman in blue jeans in a "suggestive, full-length pose," read: "Paul Newman is 'Hud'! ... the man with the barbed-wire soul."

== Release and reception ==
Hud was acclaimed during its premiere at the 24th Venice International Film Festival. After its general release on May 29, 1963, the film grossed $10 million at the domestic box office, earning $5 million in theatrical rentals. It was the 19th-highest-grossing film of the year. Life called Hud an "arresting—almost great—movie", describing Paul Newman's acting as "faultless". An Outlook reviewer wrote that the four main cast members acted "splendidly"; Newman "speaks at times with an unpleasant nasal twang, but is clearly suited to the part." They described Melvyn Douglas' performance as "impeccable", Brandon deWilde's as "[successful] in looking earnest unsure of himself" and praised Patricia Neal's expressiveness. Time called the performances "splendid", and Howe's photography "brings the Texas Panhandle to dusty, sweaty life." The New York Times, in a favorable review, said Ritt's direction had "[a] powerfully realistic style" and called Ravetch and Frank's work "[an] excellent screenplay." The newspaper called Newman's acting "tremendous", Douglas' "magnificent", deWilde's "eloquent of clean, modern youth" and Patricia Neal's "brilliant." The review also praised James Wong Howe's "excellent" camera work and Elmer Bernstein's "poignant" score. Variety called Hud "a near miss"; its screenplay fails to "filter its meaning and theme lucidly through its characters and story", although it called the four leads' performances "excellent."

Through the character of Hud, Ritt and Newman had intended to show the corruption of modern capitalism and the pitfalls of admiring an individual blindly, without observing his character. Critics, however, did not universally echo this view. Life's review described Hud as "likable, smart, and [with] the potential to measure up to his tough, honorable father" and Saturday Review called him a "charming, raffish monster". According to Outlook, "Hud Bannon is a mean, unscrupulous man who never has even a momentary twinge of conscience or change of heart"; in the end scene, Hud "[p]ulls down the shade on the world of goodness and decency". Pauline Kael initially described the film as an "anti-Western"; she called it an "anti-American film", which was "so astutely made and yet such a mess that it (was) redeemed by its fundamental dishonesty."

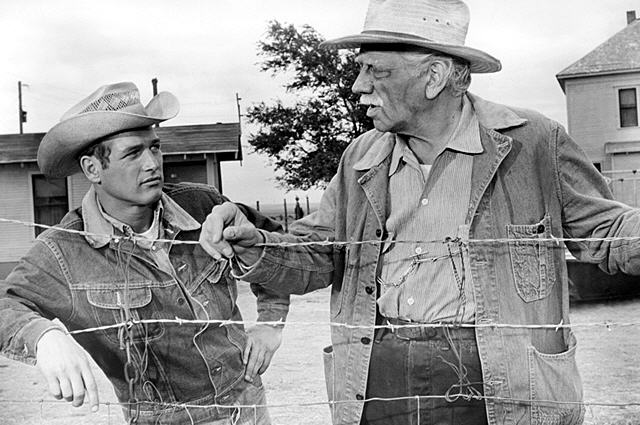
Originally planned as an antihero, self-centered Hud Bannon was liked by some viewers

The Los Angeles Times critic John L. Scott felt that the film was "a bewildering, at times brilliant, bitter look at life in the raw". The reviewer described the relation between Hud and Homer and determined that "two hours of this type of conflict can prove distasteful" but he added that the "vivid performances of principals" and "some yeoman work" by Ritt "are definite credits, turning 'Hud' into an absorbing, if troubling, cinematic experience". Scott commented that in the film "Newman gives one of his finest portrayals". Meanwhile, he deemed Douglas's acting "a powerful, wrenching portrayal". He praised Neal's "bawdy humor" that "combines drabness and attractiveness in quite wonderful fashion", and called deWilde "a good choice for the role". The reviewer celebrated Howe as "long one of the best, with fine photography". The New York Daily News rated Hud four stars, as the publication considered the movie "a rarity, a realistic film about real people, hard, stubborn cattlemen of Texas, a drama unsentimental and uncompromising in a strained relationship". The piece determined that Ritt "made a picture that has nothing wrong with it" and that it was "storytelling at its best". The performances of Newman, deWilde, Douglas, and Neal were welcomed as "uniform perfection" as the review further added that they "play these strong people as if they had lived them". The column concluded that Hud was "a western of a rare variety, modern and effectively dramatic."

The Philadelphia Inquirer wrote that calling the film "a western" would put it "a very specific story into a very general category". Reviewer Henry Murdock felt that Hud had "a highly individualistic, arresting approach of its own." The review expressed that it was "filled with good performances" and that Ritt "can make mood as important as action". Murdock hailed Newman and Douglas's performance as "superb as the antagonists", while he remarked deWilde's "intuition to the role". However, the review focused on Neal's appearance, which the reviewer considered "of such courage and clarity, such understating of Hud's character" that Murdock "wanted to violate all the rules of critics' behavior by applauding her terrific performance." Meanwhile, the Chicago Tribune attributed the main character's behavior as "one of the reasons for this pictures' power, in addition to some superior performances, is that provides no easy answers." Newman's interpretation, that treated the role in a "smoldering, shattering fashion" was deemed "powerful". Douglas's appearance was seen as "the perfect touch of a true professional", while deWilde's offered "innocence and vulnerability without the slightest trace of mawkishness." The review finished crediting Ritt with "an uncompromising story with economical effectiveness."

The Miami Herald praised the film, as the publication opined that Ritt produced "superb performances out of his first rate cast." Critic Jack Anderson hailed Ravetch and Frank's adaptation that offered "a well balanced script" and "skillfully managed inter-relationship of its characters." Meanwhile, he described Howe's capture of the Texas Panhandle as "spell-binding effectiveness". While Anderson felt that the story was "a depressing one", he opined that it was "so well told and acted that it transcends its emotional murkiness to make it completely fascinating to watch." The Kansas City Star favored Newman's "enormous range and depth". The reviewer felt that Hud was "much like life" as in the end "Nothing is settled, no real victories are won and none of the principals undergoes a major change in character or personality". For the reviewer, Neal showed "wit and allure" and deWilde appeared "callow, yet wise; eager, yet restrained". The publication attributed its positive reception to Ravetch and Frank's screenplay, as well as to Ritt's interpretation of the material. It described Ritt's direction as "building tension and then changing step quickly as the fury mounts". For the reviewer, Hud was "enhanced considerably by the use of black and white film", while he added that the characters were "so vital" that "color photography might have overstated the general tone".

Although Hud was conceived as an outwardly charming, but morally repugnant character, audiences, especially young people, found him likable, even admirable. Paul Newman said, "We thought [the] last thing people would do was accept Hud as a heroic character ... His amorality just went over [the audience's] head; all they saw was this Western, heroic individual". Martin Ritt later attributed audience interpretation of the character to the counterculture of the 1960s which "changed the values" of the young audiences who saw Hud as a hero.

MAD Magazine satirized the film as Hood in its December 1963 issue.

In 2018, the film was selected for preservation in the United States National Film Registry by the Library of Congress as being "culturally, historically, or aesthetically significant".

On the review aggregator website Rotten Tomatoes, 86% of 35 critics' reviews are positive, with an average rating of 7.5/10. The website's consensus reads: "A Western that swaps out the Hollywood glamor for shades of moral gray, Hud is a sobering showcase for a sterling ensemble of actors at the top of their respective games." Metacritic, which uses a weighted average, assigned the film a score of 62 out of 100, based on 8 critics, indicating "generally favorable" reviews.

=== Later evaluation in film guides ===
Leonard Maltin's Movie Guide gave Hud four stars out of four. Maltin called the film "An excellent story of moral degradation, with impeccable performances by all". Steven H. Scheuer's Movies on TV also gave the film four stars out of four; Scheuer called it "a must for movie-drama fans", and said the cast was "superb". In Film and Video Guide Leslie Halliwell gave Hud four stars out of four, calling it "unique". Allmovie gave Hud five stars out of five, calling the film "a warning shot for the Sixties" and saying that its "generational conflict would prove prescient". It praised Howe's cinematography, which gave the film "an authentic Western feel".

=== Awards and nominations ===
Award	Category	Nominee(s)	Result	Ref.
Academy Awards	Best Director	Martin Ritt	Nominated	
Academy Awards	Best Actor	Paul Newman	Nominated	
Academy Awards	Best Actress	Patricia Neal	Won	
Academy Awards	Best Supporting Actor	Melvyn Douglas	Won	
Academy Awards	Best Screenplay – Based on Material from Another Medium	Irving Ravetch and Harriet Frank Jr.	Nominated	
Academy Awards	Best Art Direction – Black-and-White	Art Direction: Hal Pereira and Tambi Larsen; Set Decoration: Samuel M. Comer and Robert R. Benton	Nominated	
Academy Awards	Best Cinematography – Black-and-White	James Wong Howe	Won	
American Cinema Editors Awards	Best Edited Feature Film	Frank Bracht	Nominated	
British Academy Film Awards	Best Film from any Source		Nominated	
British Academy Film Awards	Best Foreign Actor	Paul Newman	Nominated	
British Academy Film Awards	Best Foreign Actress	Patricia Neal	Won	
Directors Guild of America Awards	Outstanding Directorial Achievement in Motion Pictures	Martin Ritt	Nominated	
Golden Globe Awards	Best Motion Picture – Drama		Nominated	
Golden Globe Awards	Best Actor in a Motion Picture – Drama	Paul Newman	Nominated	
Golden Globe Awards	Best Supporting Actor – Motion Picture	Melvyn Douglas	Nominated	
Golden Globe Awards	Best Supporting Actress – Motion Picture	Patricia Neal	Nominated	
Golden Globe Awards	Best Director – Motion Picture	Martin Ritt	Nominated	
Laurel Awards	Top Drama		Won	
Laurel Awards	Top Male Dramatic Performance	Paul Newman	Won	
Laurel Awards	Top Female Dramatic Performance	Patricia Neal	Won	
Laurel Awards	Top Male Supporting Performance	Melvyn Douglas	Won	
National Board of Review Awards	Top Ten Films		4th Place	
National Board of Review Awards	Best Actress	Patricia Neal	Won	
National Board of Review Awards	Best Supporting Actor	Melvyn Douglas	Won	
National Film Preservation Board	National Film Registry		Inducted	
New York Film Critics Circle Awards	Best Film		Nominated	
New York Film Critics Circle Awards	Best Director	Martin Ritt	Nominated	
New York Film Critics Circle Awards	Best Actor	Paul Newman	Nominated	
New York Film Critics Circle Awards	Best Actress	Patricia Neal	Won	
New York Film Critics Circle Awards	Best Screenplay	Irving Ravetch and Harriet Frank Jr.	Won	
Venice International Film Festival	Golden Lion	Martin Ritt	Nominated	
Venice International Film Festival	OCIC Award	Martin Ritt	Won	
Writers Guild of America Awards	Best Written American Drama	Harriet Frank Jr. and Irving Ravetch	Won	

== Preservation ==
The Academy Film Archive preserved Hud in 2005. In 2018, the film was selected for preservation in the United States National Film Registry by the Library of Congress as being "culturally, historically, or aesthetically significant."

== See also ==
- List of American films of 1963
