= Harriet Frank Jr. =

American screenwriter and producer (1923–2020)

- Born: Harriet Goldstein; March 2, 1923; Portland, Oregon, U.S.
- Died: January 28, 2020 (aged 96); Los Angeles, California, U.S.
- Other names: Harriet Frank; James P. Bonner
- Occupations: Writer; producer
- Years active: 1947–1990
- Spouse: Irving Ravetch (m. 1946; died 2010)
- Relatives: Michael Frank (nephew); Joshua Ravetch (nephew)

Harriet Frank Jr. (born Harriet Goldstein; March 2, 1923 – January 28, 2020) was an American writer and producer. Frequently collaborating with her husband Irving Ravetch, Frank received many awards during her career, including the New York Film Critics Circle Awards and the Writers Guild of America Award, and several nominations.

Frank began her writing career after World War II, under Metro-Goldwyn-Mayer's young writer's training program, where she first met her future husband. She married Ravetch in 1946 but worked independently for ten years, finally collaborating with him in 1957, a relationship that continued for the remainder of her career. During 33 years of collaboration, Frank and Ravetch created the screenplays for a variety of films, mainly adaptations of the works of American authors.

Frank and Ravetch maintained a close working relationship with American director Martin Ritt, collaborating with him on eight film projects. After initially being suggested by Ravetch to direct The Long, Hot Summer (1958), Ritt eventually drew the couple out of inactivity on three occasions, hiring them to write the screenplays for Norma Rae (1979), Murphy's Romance (1985) and Stanley & Iris (1990). The last was both the last film directed by Ritt (who died later that year) and the last screenplay by Frank and Ravetch.

Frank is a primary focus of The Mighty Franks: A Memoir (2017), written by her nephew Michael Frank, a writer of fiction and non-fiction. She has a prominent, fictionalized role in the stage play Writer's Cramp, written by her other nephew, the playwright Joshua Ravetch and performed at The Geffen Playhouse with Holland Taylor and Robert Forster in the A.S.K. in 2009.

== Life and career ==
=== Early life ===
Harriet Frank Jr. was born and raised in Portland, Oregon, the daughter of Edith Frances (Bergman) and Sam Goldstein, a shoe store owner. Her mother changed the family name to Frank, and her own name to Harriet, making herself Harriet Sr. and her daughter Harriet Jr. In 1939, she relocated with her family to Los Angeles, where her mother worked as a Hollywood story editor; her father attended the University of California, Los Angeles (UCLA) at the same time as Irving Ravetch, her future husband. Having graduated at different times from UCLA, the two met in the Metro-Goldwyn-Mayer young writers' training program after World War II.

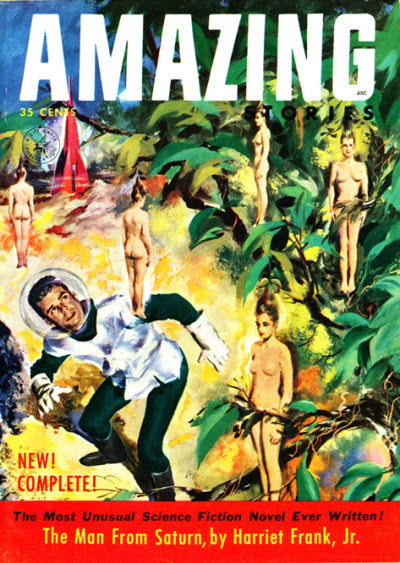
Cover of a 1953 issue of Amazing Stories magazine, featuring Frank's science fiction short story "The Man from Saturn"

Frank and Ravetch married in 1946, but worked independently for over 10 years, with Frank writing for projects such as A Really Important Person (short, 1947), Whiplash (1948) and Run for Cover (1955). During the 1950s, Frank supported the couple financially by writing comic short stories for magazines such as Collier’s, The Saturday Evening Post and Amazing Stories. The Man From Saturn, which first appeared in Amazing Stories, was later published as a chapbook.

The couple first collaborated on the script of an adaptation of William Faulkner's novel The Hamlet, released as The Long, Hot Summer (1958), but Frank later said "in the end, we created mostly new material, so it wasn't really a true adaptation". Of their collaborative process, Frank said in a 2003 interview that they would draft a one-page outline of the script and then "once we’re ready to begin, we start ‘talking’ the screenplay to each other. Out loud. It’s a line-for-line conversation".

=== Collaborations ===
Martin Ritt, having directed The Long, Hot Summer on suggestion by Ravetch, then directed the couple's next collaboration The Sound and the Fury (1959), again an adaptation of a William Faulkner novel. Frank and Ravetch collaborated on two films released in 1960, Home from the Hill, an adaptation of the novel of the same name, and The Dark at the Top of the Stairs, an adaptation of a Tony Award-winning play.

Frank and Ravetch reunited with Ritt to write the screenplay for Hud (1963), adapted from the novel Horseman, Pass By (1961) by Larry McMurtry. The film received positive reviews from critics, with the couple sharing a New York Film Critics Circle Award for "Best Screenplay" and a Writers Guild of America Award (WGA Award) for Best Written American Drama. They were nominated for an Academy Award in the category of Best Writing, Screenplay Based on Material from Another Medium.

Frank worked alongside her husband and Ritt on Hombre (1967), a Revisionist Western based on the novel of the same name. The next year, Frank and Ravetch wrote the screenplay for House of Cards (1968), released in the U.S. the following year and directed by John Guillermin. For House of Cards, Frank was credited, together with her husband, under the pen name of James P. Bonner. Frank and Ravetch returned to the works of William Faulkner, writing the screenplay for a film adaptation of his last novel The Reivers (1969).

Frank and Ravetch wrote the screenplay for The Cowboys (1972), based on the novel of the same name, and The Carey Treatment (also 1972), based on the novel A Case of Need by Michael Crichton. For the latter, the couple were again credited as James P. Bonner, the last time they adopted the pen name. The couple reunited with Martin Ritt to write the screenplay for Conrack (1974), based on the autobiographical book The Water Is Wide, with Frank also working as producer. The film was commercially and critically well-received, winning a BAFTA award. The couple wrote for an adaptation of the novel The Bank Robber, released as The Spikes Gang (also 1974). Around this time, Frank also wrote the novels Single: a novel (1977), and Special Effects (1979).

=== Later screenplays ===
Frank and Ravetch's next project, Norma Rae (1979), was another collaboration with director Martin Ritt. The film tells the story of a factory worker from the Southern United States who becomes involved in labour union activities. Unusually for the couple, the film was based on a true story, that of Crystal Lee Jordan. It was arguably the best received film of their careers, winning numerous awards, including two Academy Awards.

Six years passed before the couple's next filmed screenplay, this time for the romantic comedy Murphy's Romance (1985), based on a novel by Max Schott. They worked again with Ritt, their seventh project together, and with Sally Field, who had played the titular lead role in Norma Rae. Despite Murphy's Romance being well-received (it was nominated for two Academy Awards), it was five years before another Frank and Ravetch screenplay was shot; hired by Ritt, the couple wrote the screenplay for Stanley & Iris (1990), loosely based on the novel Union Street by British writer Pat Barker.

=== Death ===
Frank Jr. died at her home in Los Angeles on January 28, 2020, at age 96.

=== Legacy ===
On December 8, 1990, ten months after the release of Stanley & Iris, Martin Ritt died. Together, the trio of Frank, Ravetch and Ritt had collaborated on eight films and achieved considerable successes. As well as being the last film for Ritt, Stanley & Iris marked the end of Frank and Ravetch's writing careers. In a career spanning 43 years and 21 film productions, Frank won four awards and received many nominations, sharing them all with her husband. As well as with her husband and Ritt, Frank collaborated extensively with actors such as Paul Newman, writing for three of his film appearances (The Long, Hot Summer, Hud, and Hombre).

Frank ("Auntie Hankie") is a primary focus of The Mighty Franks: A Memoir (2017), written by her nephew Michael Frank, a writer of fiction and non-fiction. Philip Hoare of The Guardian wrote that: "In Aunt Hankie, Frank has created a great new nonfictional character: an indelible wonder of dark depths and hypnotic high style". Mike Barnes of The Hollywood Reporter opined that Frank wrote "not very glowingly" of his aunt.

== Bibliography ==
Novel
Year	Novel	Publisher
1977	Single	Houghton Mifflin
1979	Special Effects	Houghton Mifflin

== Filmography ==
Film
Year	Film	Notes
1947	A Really Important Person	
1948	Silver River	
1948	Whiplash	
1955	Ten Wanted Men (story only)	
1955	Run for Cover	Alternative title: Colorado
1958	The Long, Hot Summer	
1959	The Sound and the Fury	
1960	Home from the Hill	
1960	The Dark at the Top of the Stairs	
1963	Hud	
1963	Baby Makes Three	Television movie
1967	Hombre	
1968	House of Cards	Credited as James P. Bonner
1969	The Reivers	Alternative title: The Yellow Winton Flyer
1972	The Cowboys	
1972	The Carey Treatment	Credited as James P. Bonner; Alternative titles: Emergency Ward
1974	Conrack	Producer
1974	The Spikes Gang	
1979	Norma Rae	
1985	Murphy's Romance	
1990	Stanley & Iris	
Television
Year	Title	Notes
1965	The Long, Hot Summer	

== Awards and nominations ==
Year	Award	Result	Category	Film
1964	Academy Award	Nominated	Best Writing, Screenplay Based on Material from Another Medium	Hud (Shared with Irving Ravetch)
1980	Academy Award	Nominated	Best Writing, Screenplay Based on Material from Another Medium	Norma Rae (Shared with Irving Ravetch)
1973	Edgar Award	Nominated	Best Motion Picture	The Carey Treatment (Credited as James P. Bonner)
1980	Golden Globe Award	Nominated	Best Screenplay – Motion Picture	Norma Rae (Shared with Irving Ravetch)
1963	New York Film Critics Circle Awards	Won	Best Screenplay	Hud (Shared with Irving Ravetch)
1972	Western Heritage Awards	Won	Theatrical Motion Picture	The Cowboys (Shared with cast and crew)
1959	Writers Guild of America Award	Nominated	Best Written American Drama	The Long Hot Summer (Shared with Irving Ravetch)
1964	Writers Guild of America Award	Won	Best Written American Drama	Hud (Shared with Irving Ravetch)
1970	Writers Guild of America Award	Nominated	Best Comedy Adapted from Another Medium	The Reivers (Shared with Irving Ravetch)
1975	Writers Guild of America Award	Nominated	Best Drama Adapted from Another Medium	Conrack (Shared with Irving Ravetch)
1980	Writers Guild of America Award	Nominated	Best Drama Adapted from Another Medium	Norma Rae (Shared with Irving Ravetch)
1988	Writers Guild of America Award	Won	Laurel Award for Screenwriting Achievement	-
