= House of Cards (1968 film) =

1968 film by John Guillermin

- Poster for House of Cards (1969)
- Directed by: John Guillermin
- Screenplay by: Irving Ravetch; Harriet Frank, Jr.
- Based on: House of Cards by Stanley Ellin
- Produced by: Dick Berg
- Starring: George Peppard; Inger Stevens; Orson Welles; Keith Mitchell
- Cinematography: Piero Portalupi
- Edited by: J. Terry Williams
- Music by: Francis Lai
- Color process: Technicolor
- Production company: Westward Films
- Distributed by: Universal Pictures
- Release dates: 18 November 1968 (UK); 14 September 1969 (US)
- Running time: 105 minutes
- Country: United States
- Language: English

House of Cards is a 1968 American neo-noir crime film directed by John Guillermin and starring George Peppard, Inger Stevens, and Orson Welles. Filmed in France and Italy, it marked the third time that Peppard and Guillermin worked together (they had previously collaborated on the 1966 film The Blue Max, then P.J.).

The film was first released in the United Kingdom in November 1968, but was not released in the United States until the following September.

== Plot ==
Reno Davis is an American writer who has recently retired from boxing. Now unemployed and broke in France, he encounters the wealthy widow of a French general. Anne de Villemont is attracted to Reno, and he to her, but she keeps him at arm's length. She also hires him to tutor her eight-year-old son Paul. The real reason she wants Reno is for protection.

Reno is led to believe that Anne's husband was killed in the Algerian conflict, and he is troubled by Anne's intense fear that Paul will be kidnapped. He then discovers the family has ties to a fascist organization that plans to take over all of Europe. He takes on the shady psychiatrist Morillon and mysterious family friend Charles Leschenhaut, both of whom frighten Anne whenever they are around.

Reno is framed for his best friend Louis Le Buc's murder as he and Anne become the targets of the ambitious and maniacal schemers who wish to rule Europe. Reno and Anne are hunted around France while protecting Paul from being abducted. The chase ends at the Colosseum in Rome, where Reno and the villains engage in a showdown.

== Cast ==
- George Peppard as Reno Davis
- Inger Stevens as Anne de Villemont
- Orson Welles as Charles Leschenhaut
- Keith Michell as Morillon
- Maxine Audley as Mathilde Rosier
- William Job as Bernard Bourdon
- Peter Bayliss as Edmond Vosier
- Patience Collier as Gabrielle de Villemont
- Barnaby Shaw as Paul de Villemont
- Ave Ninchi as Signora Braggi
- Renzo Palmer as The Monk
- Francesco Mulé as Trevi policeman
- Rosemarie Dexter as Daniella Braggi
- Raoul Delfosse as Louis Le Buc
- Perrette Pradier as Jeanne-Marie
- Geneviève Cluny as Veronique
- James Mishler as Jesse Hardee
- Jean Louis as Driot
- Jacques Roux as Maguy
- Jean Hébey as French conductor

== Production ==
The film was based on a novel by Stanley Ellin. In May 1966, before the novel had been published, Universal announced that it would produce a film adaptation. By October 1966, the film had Dick Berg as producer and Irving Ravetch and Harriet Frank Jr. as writers. The novel was issued in 1967. The Los Angeles Times called it "superb."

George Peppard was cast in July 1967. Eva Renzi's casting was announced in August. That same month, John Guillermin signed on to direct what would be his third film with Peppard.

=== Shooting ===
Filming started in August 1967 in Paris. Shortly into filming, Renzi withdrew for personal reasons and was replaced by Inger Stevens. In September, the unit moved to Rome.

During filming, Peppard joked that the film should be called The Running Jumping and Never Standing Still Film.

== Reception ==
The Los Angeles Times called House of Cards "a mildly diverting so-so adventure movie that could have been so much better."

== Home media ==
HOUSE OF CARDS was released in North America on Blu-ray in 2026 by Kino-Lorber in association with Universal Pictures. It was also released on DVD in France (Bach Films, 2007), Germany (Mondo Entertainment, 2009) and Italy (Sinister Film, 2013). A region-free Blu-ray edition with audio commentary was released by Australian company IMPRINT Films/ViaVision in 2021. (Note there is no indication on the packaging or the disc that "House of Cards" was a 'Region B' release).

== See also ==
- List of American films of 1968
