= The Reivers (film) =

1969 film by Mark Rydell

- Theatrical release poster
- Directed by: Mark Rydell
- Written by: Harriet Frank Jr. Irving Ravetch
- Based on: The Reivers, a Reminiscence; 1962 novel by William Faulkner
- Produced by: Irving Ravetch
- Starring: Steve McQueen; Sharon Farrell; Will Geer; Michael Constantine; Rupert Crosse; Mitch Vogel
- Narrated by: Burgess Meredith
- Cinematography: Richard Moore
- Edited by: Thomas Stanford
- Music by: John Williams
- Production companies: Cinema Center Films; Duo Films; Solar Productions
- Distributed by: National General Pictures
- Release date: December 25, 1969
- Running time: 107 minutes
- Country: United States
- Language: English
- Budget: $5 million

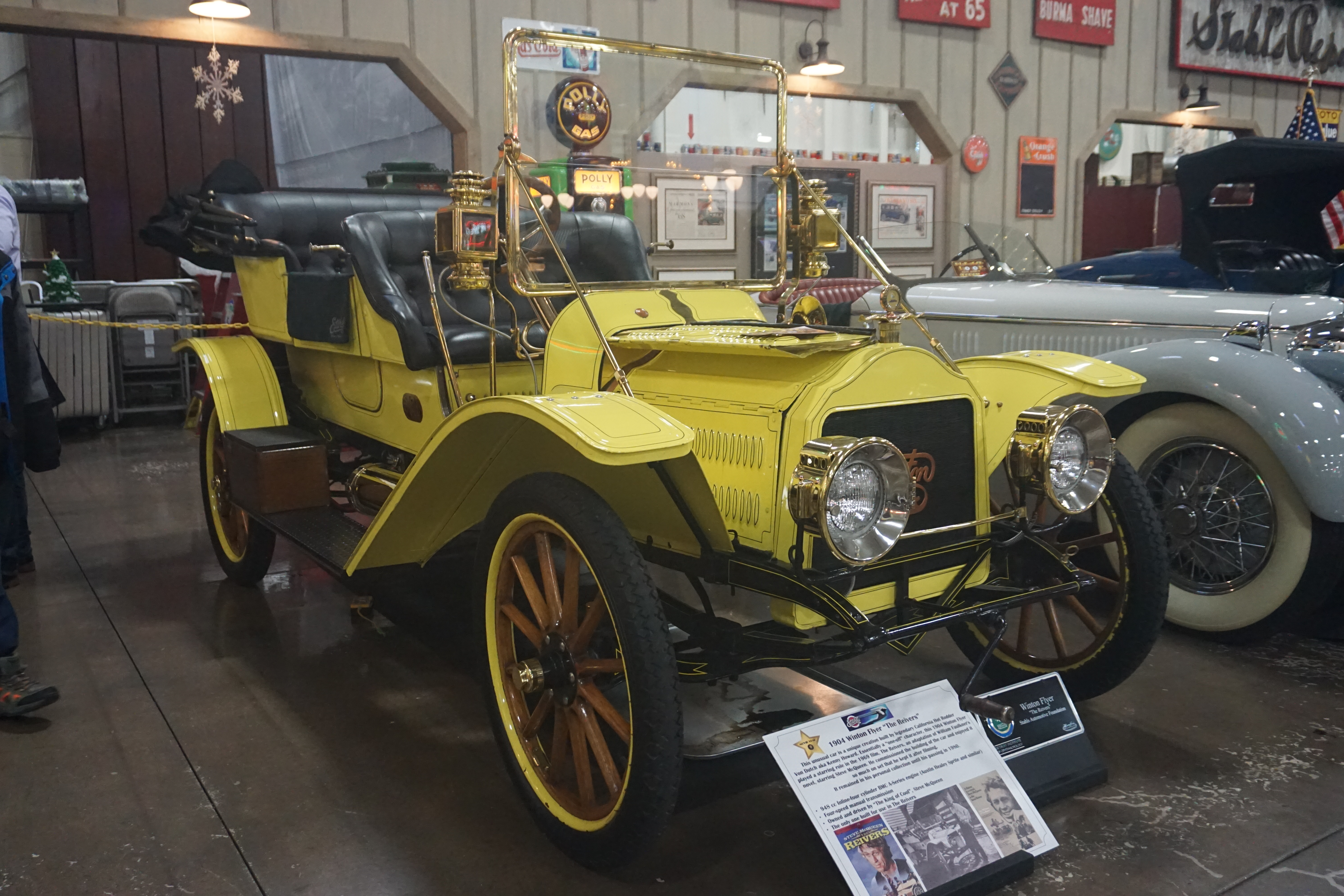
1904 Winton Flyer from The Reivers at Stahls Automotive Collection

The Reivers (also known as The Yellow Winton Flyer in the U.K.) is a 1969 Technicolor film in Panavision starring Steve McQueen and directed by Mark Rydell, based on the 1962 William Faulkner novel The Reivers, a Reminiscence. The supporting cast includes Sharon Farrell, Rupert Crosse, and Mitch Vogel, and Burgess Meredith as the narrator.

== Plot ==
Set in 1905, the film follows the exploits of the likable but raffish Boon Hoggenbeck, who takes an interest in a new car, a new 1905 Winton Flyer owned by Boss, patriarch of the McCaslin family, who live in the Mississippi area where Boon lives. When the taking of the car, first by Boon, then by Ned — who are reivers, or thieves — leads to a public brawl, the local magistrate lets them off on a bond that Boss pays on the condition that both men stay out of trouble and far away from the car while he is away with family to attend a funeral. Boon violates the condition when he takes the car again to go to Memphis to see his love interest, Corrie, and talks his young friend Lucius into going for the ride. Ned stows away, as well, but Boon grudgingly allows him to come. Other characters include a racehorse that loves sardines, a friendly bordello madam and her amiable employees, and a man with a horse who lives near an impassable sinkhole full of mud for which he charges expensive rates to get both carts and cars through.

== Cast ==
- Steve McQueen as Boon Hogganbeck
- Sharon Farrell as Corrie
- Mitch Vogel as Lucius McCaslin
- Rupert Crosse as Ned McCaslin
- Ruth White as Miss Reba
- Michael Constantine as Mr. Binford
- Clifton James as Butch Lovemaiden
- Juano Hernandez as Uncle Possum
- Lonny Chapman as Maury McCaslin, Lucius' Father
- Will Geer as Boss McCaslin, Lucius' Grandfather
- Allyn Ann McLerie as Alison McCaslin, Lucius' Mother
- Lindy Davis as Otis
- Diane Shalet as Hannah
- Pat Randall as May Ellen
- Diane Ladd as Phoebe
- Ellen Geer as Sally
- Dub Taylor as Dr. Peabody
- Burgess Meredith as The Narrator (voice)

== Box office ==
In its first two weeks, the film grossed $4,166,123 from 281 engagements.

== Awards ==
1970 Oscar Nominations:

- Actor in a Supporting Role – Rupert Crosse, making him the first African American to receive a nomination in this category
- Music (Original Score – for a motion picture [not a musical]) – John Williams

== Home media ==
The Reivers was released on DVD by Paramount Home Video on June 14, 2005, in Region 1 widescreen.

The film was later released on Blu-ray by Kino Lorber.

== See also ==
- List of American films of 1969
- List of films about horses
