= New York Film Critics Circle Award for Best Screenplay =

Award

The New York Film Critics Circle Award for Best Screenplay is an annual film award given by the New York Film Critics Circle.

== History ==
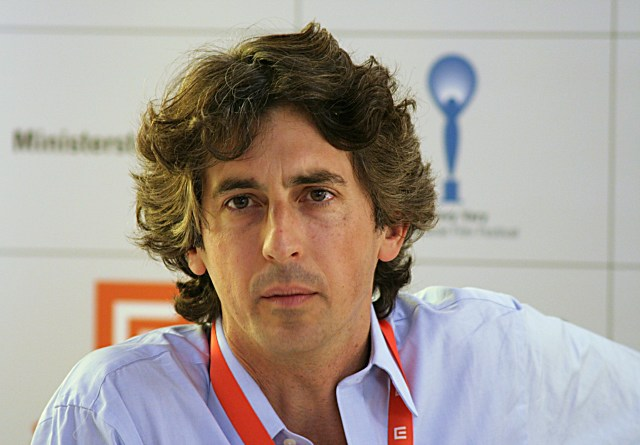
Alexander Payne

The most successful in this category were Woody Allen, Robert Benton, Ingmar Bergman, Kenneth Lonergan, Paul Mazursky, Quentin Tarantino and the author duo Alexander Payne and Jim Taylor, who each won the award twice. The Film Critics Association was able to present the Oscar winners in advance 20 times (13 times original screenplays, seven times adaptations).

== Winners ==
=== 1950s ===
Year	Winner	Writer(s)	Source
1956	Around the World in 80 Days	James Poe, John Farrow, and S. J. Perelman	novel by Jules Verne
1957	No award given		
1958	The Defiant Ones	Nedrick Young and Harold Jacob Smith	—
1959	Anatomy of a Murder	Wendell Mayes	novel by Robert Traver

=== 1960s ===
Year	Winner	Writer(s)	Source
1960	The Apartment	I. A. L. Diamond and Billy Wilder	—
1961	Judgment at Nuremberg	Abby Mann	teleplay by Abby Mann
1962	No award given (newspaper strike)		
1963	Hud	Irving Ravetch and Harriet Frank Jr.	novel by Larry McMurtry
1964	The Servant	Harold Pinter	novel by Robin Maugham
1965	No award given		
1966	A Man for All Seasons	Robert Bolt	play by Robert Bolt
1967	Bonnie and Clyde	David Newman and Robert Benton	—
1968	Pretty Poison	Lorenzo Semple Jr.	novel by Stephen Geller
1969	Bob & Carol & Ted & Alice	Paul Mazursky and Larry Tucker	—

=== 1970s ===
Year	Winner	Writer(s)	Source
1970	My Night at Maud's	Éric Rohmer	—
1971	The Last Picture Show	Larry McMurtry and Peter Bogdanovich	novel by Larry McMurtry
1971	Sunday Bloody Sunday	Penelope Gilliatt	—
1972	Cries and Whispers	Ingmar Bergman	—
1973	American Graffiti	George Lucas, Gloria Katz, and Willard Huyck	—
1974	Scenes from a Marriage	Ingmar Bergman	—
1975	The Story of Adele H.	François Truffaut, Suzanne Schiffman, and Jean Gruault	diaries by Adèle Hugo
1976	Network	Paddy Chayefsky	—
1977	Annie Hall	Woody Allen and Marshall Brickman	—
1978	An Unmarried Woman	Paul Mazursky	—
1979	Breaking Away	Steve Tesich	—

=== 1980s ===
Year	Winner	Writer(s)	Source
1980	Melvin and Howard	Bo Goldman	—
1981	Atlantic City	John Guare	—
1982	Tootsie	Larry Gelbart and Murray Schisgal	—
1983	Local Hero	Bill Forsyth	—
1984	Places in the Heart	Robert Benton	—
1985	The Purple Rose of Cairo	Woody Allen	—
1986	My Beautiful Laundrette	Hanif Kureishi	—
1987	Broadcast News	James L. Brooks	—
1988	Bull Durham	Ron Shelton	—
1989	Drugstore Cowboy	Gus Van Sant and Daniel Yost	—

=== 1990s ===
Year	Winner	Writer(s)	Source
1990	Mr. & Mrs. Bridge	Ruth Prawer Jhabvala	novels by Evan S. Connell
1991	Naked Lunch	David Cronenberg	novel by William S. Burroughs
1992	The Crying Game	Neil Jordan	—
1993	The Piano	Jane Campion	—
1994	Pulp Fiction	Quentin Tarantino and Roger Avary	—
1995	Sense and Sensibility	Emma Thompson	novel by Jane Austen
1996	Mother	Albert Brooks and Monica Johnson	—
1997	L.A. Confidential	Curtis Hanson and Brian Helgeland	novel by James Ellroy
1998	Shakespeare in Love	Marc Norman and Tom Stoppard	—
1999	Election	Alexander Payne and Jim Taylor	novel by Tom Perrotta

=== 2000s ===
Year	Winner	Writer(s)	Source
2000	You Can Count on Me	Kenneth Lonergan	—
2001	Gosford Park	Julian Fellowes	—
2002	Adaptation.	Charlie and Donald Kaufman	nonfiction book by Susan Orlean
2003	The Secret Lives of Dentists	Craig Lucas	novel by Jane Smiley
2004	Sideways	Alexander Payne and Jim Taylor	novel by Rex Pickett
2005	The Squid and the Whale	Noah Baumbach	—
2006	The Queen	Peter Morgan	—
2007	No Country for Old Men	Joel Coen and Ethan Coen	novel by Cormac McCarthy
2008	Rachel Getting Married	Jenny Lumet	—
2009	In the Loop	Jesse Armstrong, Simon Blackwell, Armando Iannucci, and Tony Roche	—

=== 2010s ===
Year	Winner	Writer(s)	Source
2010	The Kids Are All Right	Stuart Blumberg and Lisa Cholodenko	—
2011	Moneyball	Steven Zaillian, Aaron Sorkin, and Stan Chervin	nonfiction book by Michael Lewis
2012	Lincoln	Tony Kushner	historical study by Doris Kearns Goodwin
2013	American Hustle	Eric Warren Singer and David O. Russell	—
2014	The Grand Budapest Hotel	Wes Anderson	—
2015	Carol	Phyllis Nagy	novel by Patricia Highsmith
2016	Manchester by the Sea	Kenneth Lonergan	—
2017	Phantom Thread	Paul Thomas Anderson	—
2018	First Reformed	Paul Schrader	—
2019	Once Upon a Time in Hollywood	Quentin Tarantino	—

=== 2020s ===
Year	Winner	Writer(s)	Source
2020	Never Rarely Sometimes Always	Eliza Hittman	—
2021	Licorice Pizza	Paul Thomas Anderson	—
2022	The Banshees of Inisherin	Martin McDonagh	—
2023	May December	Samy Burch	—
2024	Anora	Sean Baker	—
2025	Marty Supreme	Josh Safdie and Ronald Bronstein	—

== Multiple winners ==
Nine writers have won the award multiple times.

Wins	Writer
2	Woody Allen
2	Paul Thomas Anderson
2	Robert Benton
2	Ingmar Bergman
2	Kenneth Lonergan
2	Paul Mazursky
2	Alexander Payne, Jim Taylor
2	Quentin Tarantino
