= The Spikes Gang =

1974 film by Richard Fleischer

- Theatrical release poster by Tom Jung
- Directed by: Richard Fleischer
- Screenplay by: Irving Ravetch; Harriet Frank, Jr.
- Based on: The Bank Robber by Giles Tippette
- Produced by: Richard Fleischer; Walter Mirisch
- Starring: Lee Marvin; Gary Grimes; Charles Martin Smith; Ron Howard; Arthur Hunnicutt; Noah Beery, Jr.
- Cinematography: Brian West
- Edited by: Frank J. Urioste; Ralph E. Winters
- Music by: Fred Karlin
- Production company: The Mirisch Corporation
- Distributed by: United Artists
- Release date: May 1, 1974
- Running time: 96 minutes
- Country: United States
- Language: English

The Spikes Gang is a 1974 American Western film directed by Richard Fleischer and starring Lee Marvin. Produced by the Mirisch Company and based on the novel The Bank Robber by Giles Tippette, the supporting cast features Gary Grimes, Charles Martin Smith and Ron Howard. Veteran character actors Arthur Hunnicutt and Noah Beery, Jr. both appear in separate "scene-stealing" performances.

== Plot ==
Harry Spikes is an aging bank robber of the fading Old West. Injured and near death, he is found and mended back to health by three impressionable youths who are lifelong friends—Wil Young, Tod Hayhew, and Les Richter. They refuse any payment from Spikes for their efforts, and when he's healed, he leaves saying he won't forget their kindness. Later, after enduring a beating from his father Abel, and encouraged by Spikes's reminiscences of the good life, Wil decides to run away from home seeking excitement and easy living, and the other 2 boys decide to follow.

The three boys eventually make it to a Texas town, hungry and despondent, and in a moment of inspiration attempt to rob a bank. In the process Tod accidentally kills a man, and Les drops all the money, but they manage to escape and cross the Rio Grande into Mexico.

Arriving in the Mexican town of Piedras Negras penniless and unable to find any work, Wil pawns his grandfather’s antique watch for $10, enough to buy them a meal. That night, they attempt to steal the watch back, but stumble right into the sheriffs office, and land in jail.

After suffering in jail for 8 weeks, the three boys happen to glance out the window and see Spikes and call him over. Good to his word, Spikes bribes the jailer, buys them baths, food and drink before saying his goodbye. He also tells them the man they killed was a state senator, and they now each have a bounty of $1500 on them, dead or alive. The boys stay in Mexico and attempt to go 'straight' working a succession of menial jobs, before again coming across Spikes who offers to take them into his "gang."

They plan a bank robbery back in the US, with Spikes first testing their mettle on a dry run in the Mexican bank. Crossing the border they camp out outside the town and are come upon by Billy Blanco aka Kid White, an old man who has deduced their plan and wants into the gang. When Spikes tells him no, he attempts to badger the boys into a gunfight to prove his worth, and Wil accidentally shoots him dead.

Everything begins to take a turn for the worse: the bank robbery is a colossal failure, Tod is shot in the back, and they have a shootout with the Posse. Momentarily safe, Spikes knows Tod is dying and encourages the others to abandon him and look out for themselves. Wil and Les refuse and Spikes leaves them, saying "Good luck." Attempting to find a doctor, Wil attracts another Posse, who descend on them as they finish burying Tod.

After riding back to Mexico, Wil leaves Les as he wants to deliver a final letter to Tod's family, saying he will meetup with Les in the "Big Church" back in the Mexican town of Piedras Negras in exactly two weeks. Arriving back from the journey, Wil enters the church and encounters Jack Basset, a man who says Les sent him, and that he's been sorely wounded, shot four times by 2 men, bounty hunters by the name of Morton and Spikes. Killing Morton outside the infirmary, Wil attempts to leave with Les only to have him die in his arms.

He heads to the Hotel to confront Spikes, and appears to surprise him in his hotel room with his gun still hanging on the bed post. Spikes tells him he met with the Governor of Texas himself, who promised him a pardon for all his crimes if he brings in the boys. He then says he respects Wil, and wishes it didn't have to be the way it is, saying he didn't mean to kill Les, but he drew on him and had no choice. Wil demands he stand up so he can kill him "fair," but Spikes throws his hat at him and pulls a hidden gun, shooting him in the chest. However, Wil manages to get off a succession of shots and kill Spikes, before stumbling out of the hotel and to the train station. Wil imagines boarding the train and returning home to embrace his father, before he collapses dead.

The film ends with a montage of the boys when they first set out on the adventure, saying "C'mon, Let's go get lucky!"

== Cast ==
- Lee Marvin as Harry Spikes
- Gary Grimes as Wilson Young
- Ron Howard as Les Richter
- Charles Martin Smith as Tod Hayhew
- Arthur Hunnicutt as Kid White / Billy Blanco
- Noah Beery, Jr. as Jack Basset
- Marc Smith as Abel Young
- Don Fellows as Cowboy
- Elliott Sullivan as Billy
- Ralph Brown as Posse Leader
- Robert Beatty as Sheriff
- Bill Curran as Gillis
- Ricardo Palacios as Doctor
- David Thomson as Sheriff of Carrizo Springs
- Bert Conway as Bank Teller
- Adolfo Thous as Pawnbroker
- Allen E. Russell as Morton
- Frances O'Flynn as Mrs. Young
- Rafael Albaicín as Shopkeeper
- Tito García as Mexican Man
- Juan Manuel Torres Gómez

== Production ==
The Spikes Gang was filmed in Tabernas, Almeria, and Andalucia, in Spain. The production style of director Richard Fleischer received generally favorable reviews. "It was only the second matchup for the director and Marvin and the actor gives a seething, unpredictable performance as the untrustworthy Harry Spikes. You can see why a trio of farmhands, well-played by his co-stars, would want to emulate him; you can also see why they come to resist the lethal charm of his coercion.", wrote one critic. Ron Howard later praised producer Walter Mirisch saying, "When I...acted in one of his productions, The Spikes Gang, I learned that a prolific and brilliant producer could also be a terrific guy and a wonderful teacher."

== Reception ==
Vincent Canby of The New York Times was not impressed: "It's a movie without a center, with no coherent tone, directed by Richard Fleischer, fresh from such triumphs as The Don Is Dead and Soylent Green. The entire enterprise is as convincing as the Spanish landscapes, which are meant to suggest the American Southwest but don't."

Keith Bailey of The Unknown Movies said, "Although the movie was filmed in Spain, you wouldn't know it, since Fleischer shot the outdoor scenes in remarkably drab locations that all look the same. And there is a breakdown in the natural flow of the story in the last twenty minutes, becoming more like a series of vignettes with little tying them together. It's therefore surprising the few times Fleischer breaks out of his mediocrity and puts in some effort."

== Home media ==
The film is available in Region 1 manufactured on demand DVD-R format, MGM on Demand via the MGM Limited Edition Collection label; also available in Region 2. The VHS version is long out of print.

The Spikes Gang was released on Blu-ray by Kino Lorber Studio Classics in November 2015.

== See also ==
- List of American films of 1974
