= Ten Wanted Men =

1955 film by H. Bruce Humberstone

- Film poster
- Directed by: Bruce Humberstone
- Screenplay by: Kenneth Gamet
- Story by: Irving Ravetch; Harriet Frank Jr.
- Produced by: Harry Joe Brown
- Starring: Randolph Scott
- Cinematography: Wilfred M. Cline
- Edited by: Gene Havlick
- Music by: Paul Sawtell
- Production company: Scott-Brown Productions
- Distributed by: Columbia Pictures
- Release date: February 1, 1955
- Running time: 80 minutes
- Country: United States
- Language: English

Ten Wanted Men is a 1955 American Western film directed by Bruce Humberstone and starring Randolph Scott.

== Plot ==
Adam Stewart, a lawyer heading west with grown son Howie, is persuaded by brother John to settle down near him in Ocatilla, Arizona, where he has a ranch and romantic interest in a widow, Corinne Michaels.

The menacing degenerate rancher Wick Campbell has an attractive servant girl, Maria Segura, and also lusts for her, but she wants nothing to do with him. Her interest in Howie strikes a jealous chord in Campbell, who hires gunfighters led by Frank Scavo to rid the region of the meddlesome (in his opinion) Stewarts once and for all.

Campbell's thugs kill a rancher and stampede some of John Stewart's cattle. One picks a fight with Howie, who surprisingly beats him to the draw in self-defense, only to be locked up by Sheriff Gibbons, falsely accused of murder. Howie busts out and flees with Maria.

Adam Stewart is killed in cold blood by Campbell, for which Howie blames himself while promising to get even. John Stewart goes into town to confront Campbell but can't find him. He's lured into a gunfight with one of Campbell's men and kills him. He escapes to Corinne's home, where he and other town leaders are trapped by Campbell's men who put the house under siege. Scavo gets hold of dynamite and begins blowing the house apart room by room. Two of the men in the house are killed, but John and Howie escape to a nearby river. Scavo throws sticks of dynamite into the river, thinking he's killed them both,

Scavo turns on Campbell, takes his gun, makes him give him the money from his safe, and says that he is now running things. Campbell goes to Maria to persuade her to come with him but is confronted by John, who has been hiding at Maria's house with a wounded Howie, and is killed in a gunfight.

John rides to town to take on Scavo's men and prevails. The city has law and order, while the Stewarts celebrate a double wedding with John marrying Corrine and Howie marrying Maria.

== Cast ==
- Randolph Scott as John Stewart
- Jocelyn Brando as Corinne Michaels
- Richard Boone as Wick Campbell
- Alfonso Bedoya as Hermando
- Donna Martell as Maria Segura
- Skip Homeier as Howie Stewart
- Clem Bevans as Tod Grinnel
- Leo Gordon as Frank Scavo
- Minor Watson as Jason Carr
- Lester Matthews as Adam Stewart
- Tom Powers as Henry Green
- Dennis Weaver as Sheriff Clyde Gibbons
- Lee Van Cleef as Al Drucker
- Kathleen Crowley as Marva Gibbons
- Louis Jean Heydt as Tom Baines
- Boyd 'Red' Morgan as Red Dawes
- Denver Pyle as Dave Weed
