= Max Schott =

American novelist (1935–2026)

Max Schott (February 12, 1935 – October 28, 2026) was an American writer of stories, novels and essays. He was raised in Southern California. Schott received his Bachelor's in Animal Husbandry from University of California, Davis and his Master's in English from the University of California, Santa Barbara. He was a lecturer in Literature for more than 30 years at the College of Creative Studies at UCSB.

Schott died on October 28, 2026, at the age of 91.

== Works ==
=== Books ===
Up Where I Used to Live: Stories (Illinois Short Fiction) (ISBN 0-252-00720-4)

Murphy’s Romance: A Novel (ISBN 0-88496-197-4)

Ben: A Novel (ISBN 0-86547-430-3)

Keeping Warm: Essays and Stories (ISBN 1-880284-64-2)

=== Film ===
Murphy's Romance – original story
