= Dale Jennings (activist) =

American activist, playwright and author

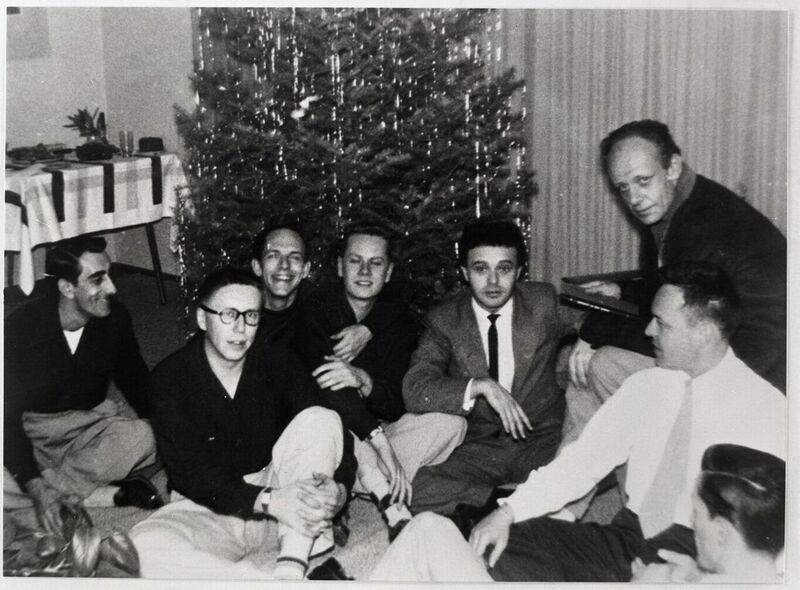
- Founders of the Mattachine Society, the first major American gay-rights advocacy organization, in 1951; left-to right is Paul Bernard, Chuck Rowland, Bob Hull, Stan Witt, Rudi Gernreich, Harry Hay (top), and Dale Jennings (light tie)
- Born: William Dale Jennings; October 21, 1917; Amarillo, Texas, U.S.
- Died: May 11, 2000 (aged 82); La Mirada, California, U.S.
- Education: University of Southern California

William Dale Jennings (October 21, 1917 – May 11, 2000) was an American LGBT rights activist, playwright and author.

== Early life ==
Jennings was born in Amarillo, Texas, the son of William Arthur Jennings and Charlotte Sophia Knebel Jennings. His family relocated to Denver, Colorado, while Jennings was still an infant. He and his sister, Charlotte Elaine, (two years older) grew up in Denver. Both were schooled in music, Elaine playing the violin and Dale (as he was known, to distinguish him from his father) the piano. The two made many appearances on local radio and at tent revival meetings. Dale showed an early love of dance, growing into a noted prodigy before the age of twelve. Later he joined the Lester Horton dance troupe as they traveled around the United States. In his late teens he moved to Los Angeles, with aspirations of becoming a writer and theater director, for which he had trained in Colorado. He eventually launched a theater company called the Theatre Caravan, located in a now demolished building near Olympic Blvd. and Alvarado, where he also lived. During this time, he wrote and produced about 60 plays.

Jennings spent World War II stationed at Guadalcanal. During his military service, he was awarded a WWII Victory Medal, an American Campaign medal, an Asiatic–Pacific campaign medal, and a Philippine Liberation Ribbon with one bronze star. After being honorably discharged in 1946, he returned to California where he studied cinema for two years at the University of Southern California. Before the war Jennings pursued relationships with women in the custom of the time, to avoid any suspicions about his true nature. He married once, an aspiring actress at Theatre Caravan; this lasted through the war, followed by divorce.

== The Mattachine Society ==
In November 1950, Jennings accompanied his then-boyfriend Bob Hull, to a meeting with Harry Hay and Chuck Rowland to discuss a prospectus that had called on the “androgynies of the world” to unite. This meeting began the first official meeting of the International Bachelors Fraternal Order for Peace and Social Dignity, which would later be renamed as the Mattachine Society. The society sought to gain acceptance through greater communication between homosexuals and heterosexuals. The group began to grow and by the summer of that year they had adopted official missions and purposes which proclaimed homosexuals to be one of the largest minorities in America.

== Arrest ==
In the spring of 1952 Jennings was arrested for allegedly soliciting a police officer in a toilet in Westlake Park, now known as MacArthur Park. The trial that took place drew national attention to the Mattachine Society and membership increased drastically owing to the decision of the Mattachine Society to help contest the charges brought against Jennings. Jennings called fellow Mattachine founder Harry Hay, and they enlisted the help of attorney George Sibley, a member of the Citizens' Council to Outlaw Entrapment. Jennings was one of the first homosexual men to contest charges such as this one. Most homosexuals at the time pleaded guilty so as not to be publicly scrutinized. His decision to fight back was a pivotal point in the movement. The organization raised funds and promoted Jennings's case nationally. The trial began June 23, 1952, and lasted ten days. Jennings confessed to being a homosexual but denied any wrongdoing. While there were different accounts of what exactly occurred that day, by the end of the trial the jury voted 11–1 for acquittal on the basis of police intimidation, harassment, and entrapment of homosexuals, and the case was dismissed. The trial brought significant attention to the Mattachine Society, increasing awareness of the Gay Rights Movement as a whole as well as increasing the organization's membership.

== ONE, Incorporated ==
While Jennings was one of the founders of the Mattachine Society, his views on how to best fight for equal rights for homosexuals differed from the organization as a whole. Harry Hay, the primary founder of the society, believed that "gays were a unique and especially talented group who had been a primary part of tribal societies and needed to come together and reclaim those sacred and traditional roles". Jennings believed that there essentially was no difference between a gay man and a straight man. Jennings adopted a more private role, believing that homosexuals as a group had very little in common, and wanted to fight for the right to be left alone while Hay and the rest of the Mattachine Society collectively wanted to make homosexuality visible to the public and fought for more homosexual awareness.

In the organization Jennings was not alone in this alternate perspective, and in 1952 a small group of members from the Mattachine Society met to discuss separating from Mattachine and forming a separate organization that would illustrate their own personal views more. In 1953, they separated from the organization and created ONE, Inc. This organization became the dominant organization in Los Angeles and with the financial assistance of Jennings's sister Elaine and her husband James Porter its magazine became, for a period of time, the voice of the gay and lesbian movement. The magazine spoke out openly and more forcefully on behalf of the rights and interests of homosexuals. Jennings was elected as vice president of the newly formed organization and became editor in chief as well as a primary writer for the magazine. During this time his writings gained popularity and momentum. Jennings found his niche as a writer, and his writings would continue to become a pivotal part in the Gay Rights Movement. The magazine included writings about police harassment and persecution from cities all across the nation based on newspaper reports sent in by its readers. Thought-provoking essays, daring social commentary and a sharp consistent design made up the overall sense of the magazine.

The magazine was produced essentially by hand, thanks to James and Elaine Porter who paid for materials and other expenses out of their own pocket, printing and assembling each issue in their printing and graphics office. Although it had a low printing circulation it had a large impact on the movement as a whole. It was the only publication that openly spoke positively of homosexuality and fought for equal legal and social status for homosexuals. The small circulation but large impact of this magazine represented a lot of the small organizations that were also a part of the movement. While small in number, each member of the movement symbolized an insecure and emerging movement among homosexuals that confronted their subjugated status in society.

After two years of heavy involvement, especially with the magazine, Jennings was pressured to leave by business manager Dorr Legg.

== After ONE ==
After leaving ONE, Jennings wrote and published his first novel, The Ronin, retold from an ancient Buddhist story, followed by The Sinking of the Sarah Diamond. Another book, The Cowboys, based on a film treatment he sold to Warner Bros., caused considerable controversy among publishers due to its glimmers of homoeroticism. The Cowboys was made into a 1972 film, starring John Wayne. While not as successful as his first book, he made enough profit from the book that allowed him to buy a ranch outside of Los Angeles. After losing his home due to a lawsuit with a former lover he moved to the town of Trinidad in Humboldt County in northern California where he decided to re-involve himself in the movement. He contacted an old friend from ONE, Don Slater, who had also separated himself from ONE and founded a new organization, HIC (Homosexual Information Center) in 1965. Jennings was very passionate about his writings, and hoped that the HIC would accept and protect his scripts and books.

The HIC believed and supported the protection of privacy in sexual relations and that this was the key to sexual freedom. Jennings stayed highly involved with the organization until 1997, when Slater died. Around this time Jennings began losing his memory and constantly worried that his writings would be lost, so he made arrangements that his works and property would go to the HIC when he died.

He continued to write until shortly before his death on May 11, 2000, at the age of 82 at Specialty Hospital in La Mirada, California; he is survived by one nephew. His legacy to the HIC consists of hundreds of articles, including unpublished books, plays, film treatments and stories. They are now housed in the Homosexual Information Center Archives, a part of the Vern and Bonnie Bullough Collection on Sex and Gender, housed at the University Library, California State University, Northridge.

== The Temperamentals ==
In 2009, Jennings and the Mattachine Society became the subjects of the play The Temperamentals by Jon Maran. After workshop performances in 2009, the play opened off-Broadway at New World Stages in early 2010. Jennings was portrayed by Sam Breslin Wright.
