= Irving Ravetch =

American screenwriter and film producer (1920-2010)

- Born: Irving Dover Ravetch; November 14, 1920; Newark, New Jersey, U.S.
- Died: September 19, 2010 (aged 89); Los Angeles, California, U.S.
- Other name: James P. Bonner
- Education: University of California, Los Angeles
- Occupations: Screenwriter, producer
- Years active: 1947–1990
- Spouse: Harriet Frank Jr. (m. 1946)

Irving Dover Ravetch (November 14, 1920 – September 19, 2010) was an American screenwriter and film producer. He frequently worked in collaboration with his wife Harriet Frank Jr. and with director Martin Ritt. He was twice nominated for the Academy Award for Best Adapted Screenplay, for Hud (1963) and Norma Rae (1979).

== Early life and education ==
Ravetch was born to a Jewish family in Newark, New Jersey, the son of Sylvia (Shapiro) and I. Shalom Ravetch, a rabbi. His mother was born in Palestine and his father in Ukraine. Ravetch was an aspiring playwright when he enrolled at University of California, Los Angeles.

== Career ==
Following graduation, he joined the young writer's training program at Metro-Goldwyn-Mayer, where he met Harriet Frank Jr., whom he married in 1946. He gained his first screen credit with Living in a Big Way which was released the following year.

For the next decade, Ravetch worked mostly on Westerns such as Vengeance Valley (1951). With Frank, he approached producer Jerry Wald and proposed they adapt the William Faulkner novel The Hamlet (1940) for the screen. The result was The Long, Hot Summer (1958), which primarily was an original story with one of Faulkner's characters at its center. When Wald greenlighted the film and asked Ravetch to choose a director, he suggested Martin Ritt, whom he knew from the Group Theatre and the Actors Studio in New York City. The Long, Hot Summer proved to be the first of eight projects – including The Sound and the Fury (1959), Hud (1963), Norma Rae (1979), Murphy's Romance (1985), and Stanley & Iris (1990) – written by Ravetch and Frank and directed by Ritt. Additional screenwriting credits include Home from the Hill (1960), The Dark at the Top of the Stairs (also 1960), The Reivers (1969), The Cowboys (1972), and The Spikes Gang (1974).

Ravetch and Frank were nominated for the Academy Award for Best Adapted Screenplay and won both the New York Film Critics Circle Award for Best Screenplay and the Writers Guild of America Award for Best Adapted Screenplay for Hud. He was a recipient of the Bronze Wrangler for The Cowboys, the Screen Laurel Award, and additional Oscar, WGA, and Golden Globe nominations.

== Personal life ==
Ravetch met Harriet Frank Jr. at Metro-Goldwyn-Mayer's young writer's training program, whom he married in 1946. The duo sometimes used the joint pen name 'James P. Bonner'.

=== Death ===
Ravetch died from pneumonia on September 19, 2010.

== Filmography ==
Year	Title	Functioned as		Director	Notes
Year	Title	Writer	Producer	Director	Notes
1947	Living in a Big Way	Yes	No	Gregory La Cava	Co-written with La Cava
1950	The Outriders	Yes	No	Roy Rowland	
1951	Vengeance Valley	Yes	No	Richard Thorpe	
1953	The Lone Hand	Story	No	George Sherman	
1955	Ten Wanted Men	Story	No	H. Bruce Humberstone	Co-written with Harriet Frank Jr.
1955	Run for Cover	Story	No	Nicholas Ray	Co-written with Harriet Frank Jr.
1958	The Long, Hot Summer	Yes	No	Martin Ritt	Co-written with Harriet Frank Jr.
1959	The Sound and the Fury	Yes	No	Martin Ritt	Co-written with Harriet Frank Jr.
1960	Home from the Hill	Yes	No	Vincente Minnelli	Co-written with Harriet Frank Jr.
1960	The Dark at the Top of the Stairs	Yes	No	Delbert Mann	Co-written with Harriet Frank Jr.
1963	Hud	Yes	Yes	Martin Ritt	Co-written with Harriet Frank Jr.
1967	Hombre	Yes	Yes	Martin Ritt	Co-written with Harriet Frank Jr.
1968	House of Cards	Yes	No	John Guillermin	Co-written with Harriet Frank Jr.
1969	The Reivers	Yes	Yes	Mark Rydell	Co-written with Harriet Frank Jr.
1972	The Cowboys	Yes	No	Mark Rydell	Co-written with Harriet Frank Jr. and Dale Jennings
1972	The Carey Treatment	Yes	No	Blake Edwards	Co-written with Harriet Frank Jr.
1974	Conrack	Yes	Yes	Martin Ritt	Co-written with Harriet Frank Jr.
1974	The Spikes Gang	Yes	Associate	Richard Fleischer	Co-written with Harriet Frank Jr.
1979	Norma Rae	Yes	No	Martin Ritt	Co-written with Harriet Frank Jr.
1985	Murphy's Romance	Yes	No	Martin Ritt	Co-written with Harriet Frank Jr.
1990	Stanley & Iris	Yes	No	Martin Ritt	Co-written with Harriet Frank Jr.

== Awards and nominations ==
Award	Year	Category	Work	Result
Academy Award	1964	Best Adapted Screenplay	Hud	Nominated
Academy Award	1980	Best Adapted Screenplay	Norma Rae	Nominated
Golden Globe Award	1980	Best Screenplay	Norma Rae	Nominated
New York Film Critics Circle Award	1963	Best Screenplay	Hud	Won
Western Heritage Award	1972	Theatrical Motion Picture	The Cowboys	Won
Writers Guild of America Award	1959	Best Written American Drama	The Long, Hot Summer	Nominated
Writers Guild of America Award	1964	Best Written American Drama	Hud	Won
Writers Guild of America Award	1970	Best Comedy Adapted from Another Medium	The Reivers	Nominated
Writers Guild of America Award	1975	Best Drama Adapted from Another Medium	Conrack	Nominated
Writers Guild of America Award	1980	Best Drama Adapted from Another Medium	Norma Rae	Nominated
Writers Guild of America Award	1988	Screen Laurel Award	—N/a	Won
