= The Long, Hot Summer =

1958 film by Martin Ritt

- Theatrical release poster
- Directed by: Martin Ritt
- Screenplay by: Irving Ravetch; Harriet Frank Jr.
- Based on: "Spotted Horses" by William Faulkner The Hamlet by William Faulkner "Barn Burning" by William Faulkner
- Produced by: Jerry Wald
- Starring: Paul Newman; Joanne Woodward; Anthony Franciosa; Orson Welles; Lee Remick; Angela Lansbury
- Cinematography: Joseph LaShelle
- Edited by: Louis R. Loeffler
- Music by: Alex North
- Production company: Jerry Wald Productions
- Distributed by: 20th Century Fox
- Release dates: March 12, 1958 (Baton Rouge, premiere); March 13, 1958 (U.S.)
- Running time: 115 minutes
- Country: United States
- Language: English
- Budget: $1.6 million
- Box office: $3.5 million (US/Canada rentals)

The Long, Hot Summer is a 1958 American drama film directed by Martin Ritt, from a screenplay by Irving Ravetch and Harriet Frank Jr.. It stars Paul Newman, Joanne Woodward, Anthony Franciosa, Orson Welles, Lee Remick, and Angela Lansbury. This Southern Gothic is based in part on three works by William Faulkner: the 1931 novella "Spotted Horses", the 1939 short story "Barn Burning" and the 1940 novel The Hamlet. The title is taken from The Hamlet, as Book Three is called "The Long Summer". Some characters, as well as tone, were inspired by Tennessee Williams' 1955 play, Cat on a Hot Tin Roof, a film adaptation of which – also starring Newman – was released five months later.

The plot follows the conflicts of the Varner family after ambitious drifter Ben Quick (Newman) arrives in their small Mississippi town. Will Varner (Welles), the patriarch, has doubts about his son, Jody (Franciosa) and sees Ben as a better choice to inherit his position. Will tries to push Ben and his daughter Clara (Woodward) into marriage.

Filmed in Clinton, Louisiana, the cast was composed mostly of former Actors Studio students, whom Ritt met while he was an assistant teacher to Elia Kazan. For the leading role, Warner Bros. loaned Newman to 20th Century Fox. The production was marked by conflicts between Welles and Ritt, which drew media attention. The music score was composed by Alex North and the title song, "The Long Hot Summer", written by North and Sammy Cahn, was performed by Jimmie Rodgers.

The film was well received by critics but did not do particularly well at the box office. Its critical success revitalized Ritt's career, after his having been blacklisted during most of the 1950s. Paul Newman's performance as Ben Quick brought him national fame, as well as the Best Actor Award at the Cannes Film Festival.

== Plot ==
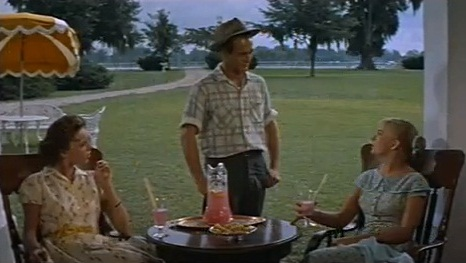
Ben Quick talks to Clara Varner. On the left is Agnes.

In Yoknapatawpha County, Mississippi, Ben Quick is on trial for barn-burning, but since there is no evidence the judge just orders him to leave town. Ben hitches a ride to the town of Frenchman's Bend, with two young women in a convertible, Clara Varner and her sister-in-law Eula. Clara's father, Will Varner, is the domineering owner of most of the town.

Will is away, but his only son, Eula's husband Jody, agrees to let Ben become a sharecropper on a vacant farm. When Will returns from a stay in the hospital, he is furious at Jody for hiring a notorious "barn burner", but soon begins to see in Ben a younger version of himself and comes to admire his ruthlessness and ambition, qualities that Jody lacks. Will is also disappointed that his 23-year-old daughter, Clara, has not married the man she has been seeing for five or six years: Alan Stewart, a genteel Southern "blue blood" and a mama's boy.

Will therefore schemes to push his daughter and Ben together. However, she is openly hostile to the crude upstart. Will is determined to have his bloodline go on, so he offers to make Ben wealthy if he marries Clara. Meanwhile, Minnie Littlejohn, Will's longtime mistress, is dissatisfied with their arrangement and wants to get married.

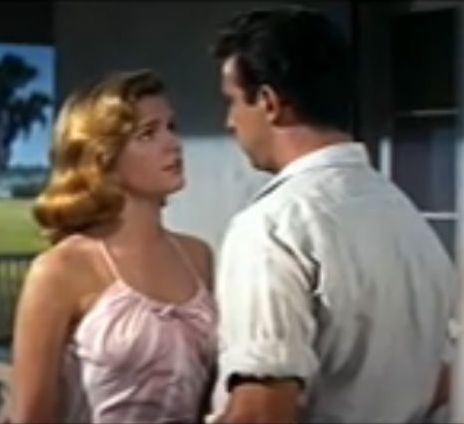
Eula and Jody

Jody becomes increasingly frustrated, seeing his position being undermined, and his marriage falters. After Ben sells some worthless wild horses for Will, he is rewarded with the job of clerk in Will's general store alongside Jody. Will even invites him to live in the family mansion.

Jody pulls a gun on Ben and threatens to kill him. Ben talks his way out by telling Jody about buried Civil War-era coins he has supposedly found on a property that Will gave him, a down payment to seal their bargain over Clara. Jody starts digging and finds a bag of coins. He is elated, thinking he has finally escaped his father's domination; he buys the land from Ben. Late that night, Will finds his son, still digging. After examining a coin, Will notices that it was minted in 1910. Jody is shattered.

Ben aggressively pursues Clara. She finally asks Alan what his intentions are, and he replies that he only wants to "help" her. Misinterpreting what Clara tells him, Will goes to congratulate Alan and his mother on the impending marriage, but is infuriated when he learns the truth. He returns home.

A defeated Jody finds his father alone in their barn. Jody bolts the entrance and sets the barn on fire, but he cannot go through with it and releases Will. Will is touched by Jody's change of heart and calls him his "strong right arm." Men from town assume Ben is the culprit and intend to lynch him, but Clara rescues him from the mob and drives him back to the plantation. Will defuses the situation by telling the mob he accidentally started the fire himself.

Ben confesses to Clara that his father was a barn-burner, committing arson when offended, and that he has been falsely dogged by such accusations because of his father. Ben tells her he is leaving town, but Clara makes it clear she has fallen in love with him. Will is so pleased with the success of his scheme, he declares he may decide to live forever.

== Cast ==
- Paul Newman as Ben Quick
- Orson Welles as Will Varner
- Joanne Woodward as Clara Varner
- Anthony Franciosa as Jody Varner
- Lee Remick as Eula Varner
- Angela Lansbury as Minnie Littlejohn
- Richard Anderson as Alan Stewart
- Sarah Marshall as Agnes Stewart
- Mabel Albertson as Elizabeth Stewart
- J. Pat O'Malley as Ratliff
- William "Bill" Walker as Lucius
- George Dunn as Peabody
- Jess Kirkpatrick as Armistead
- Val Avery as Wilk
- I. Stanford Jolley as Houstin
- Nicholas King as John Fisher
- Byron Foulger as Harris
- Victor Rodman as Justice
- Francis Sibley as the bass player in the band

== Production ==
=== Development ===
Producer Jerry Wald hired former co-worker and Warner Brothers director Martin Ritt to shoot the adaptation of two William Faulkner novels based on a recommendation by script writer Irving Ravetch. Wald convinced the studio executives to pay US$50,000 for the rights for the novels The Sound and the Fury and The Hamlet. The first to be produced, The Hamlet, was renamed The Long Hot Summer to avoid confusion with William Shakespeare's play Hamlet. Ravetch and Harriet Frank, Jr. wrote the script, also adding fragments from Faulkner's short stories "Barn Burning" and "Spotted Horses". In the new script, the book's main character, Flem Snopes, and the rest of the Snopes family were removed. The plot was recentered on a minor character, Ben Quick, and the reconciliation of the Varner family. On their first important screenplay, Ravetch and Frank implemented their signature style, using the names of characters and a few details of the plot but significantly modifying the details of the story. The final product was heavily influenced by Tennessee Williams' play Cat on a Hot Tin Roof, resulting in an "erotically charged" story.

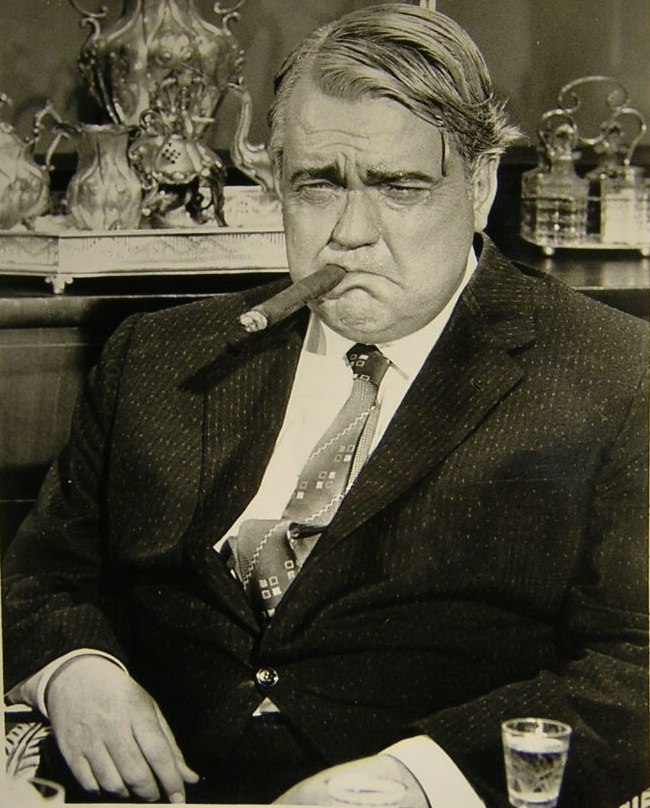
Orson Welles as Will Varner

=== Casting ===
The film attracted attention for the appearance of Orson Welles as Will Varner, the patriarch of the family. The character was inspired by Big Daddy Pollitt from Tennessee Williams' play Cat on a Hot Tin Roof. Welles' presence on the film was marked by multiple conflicts with director Martin Ritt. He agreed to take the role due to a tax debt of US$150,000; he stated years later, "I hated making Long Hot Summer. I've seldom been as unhappy in a picture."

20th Century Fox wanted to avoid casting Welles because of his temperament, but the studio was persuaded by Ritt, who considered him the right actor for the role. The director and the actor had several marked differences during the shooting of the movie, which included problems with the interpretation of the lines, costume design and the position of Welles while shooting the scenes. At one point during the production, Welles informed Ritt that he did not want to memorize his lines, requesting instead that they be dubbed afterwards. Part of the cast was intimidated by Welles' temperamental attitude.

Immediately after filming was completed, during an interview with Life, Welles explained that the cause of his behavior was that he did not know what kind of "monkeyshines" his co-stars would be or the "caprices" they would receive from him. He also stated that they overcame the differences and completed the film. Welles later wrote a letter to Ritt praising his work and apologizing for his interference during the making of the movie. Ritt replied, expounding his admiration for Welles. Despite the mutual apologies, during an interview in 1965, Ritt recalled an incident on the set. While the film was being shot, it was often stopped by bad weather. During a day suitable for shooting, he found Welles not ready for the scene, instead reading a newspaper in Spanish. Ritt decided to skip Welles's scene and shoot the next one. He attributed Welles' later cooperation to the incident, which Welles had found humiliating. Ritt thus earned the nickname "the Orson Tamer" throughout the Hollywood community.

Ritt met Paul Newman, Joanne Woodward, Anthony Franciosa, and Lee Remick while they were students at the Actors Studio, where Ritt was a teacher-assistant for Elia Kazan. Newman, who was under contract with Warner Brothers, was loaned to 20th Century Fox for a fee of US$75,000. Meanwhile, his contract earned him US$17,500 for each ten-week shot. He traveled to Clinton, Louisiana, before the start of filming to study the mannerisms, accent and speech of the Southern men in order to create a proper characterization.

Remick later admitted that during the shooting she was intimidated by Orson Welles on the set because of his "icon" status. During the production, Newman married co-star Woodward.

=== Filming ===
Filming started September 1957. The film was shot in Clinton and Baton Rouge, Louisiana, in CinemaScope color, with a budget of US$1,645,000. A Southern Gothic story, Ritt decided to shoot it on location to capture the characteristics of the area, emphasizing the regional details.

== Release ==
The film held its world premiere in Baton Rouge on March 12, 1958, before opening the following day in several cities around the United States, including Los Angeles and San Francisco. The film screened in-competition at the 1958 Cannes Film Festival, where it was nominated for the Palme d'Or and Paul Newman won the Best Actor Award.

== Reception ==
=== Box office ===
It grossed $48,000 from four theaters in Los Angeles and $15,000 in San Francisco in its first week. It opened to good reviews but did not score a significant profit at the box office, grossing US$3,500,000.

Against this, Variety did describe the movie as "very profitable". And in October 1958 the same magazine reported the film as having earned $8,500,000 worldwide.

=== Critical response ===
Billboard commended the acting as "first-rate" and "robust", with particular praise for Woodward, and also praised Ritt's direction. Meanwhile, The Reporter highlighted the film's similarities to the play Cat on a Hot Tin Roof and described the cast as "an impressive one", but remarked that the actors and characters "never seem to get together". The review called Welles "great" and "gusty", but described Woodward's participation as a "poker bluff".

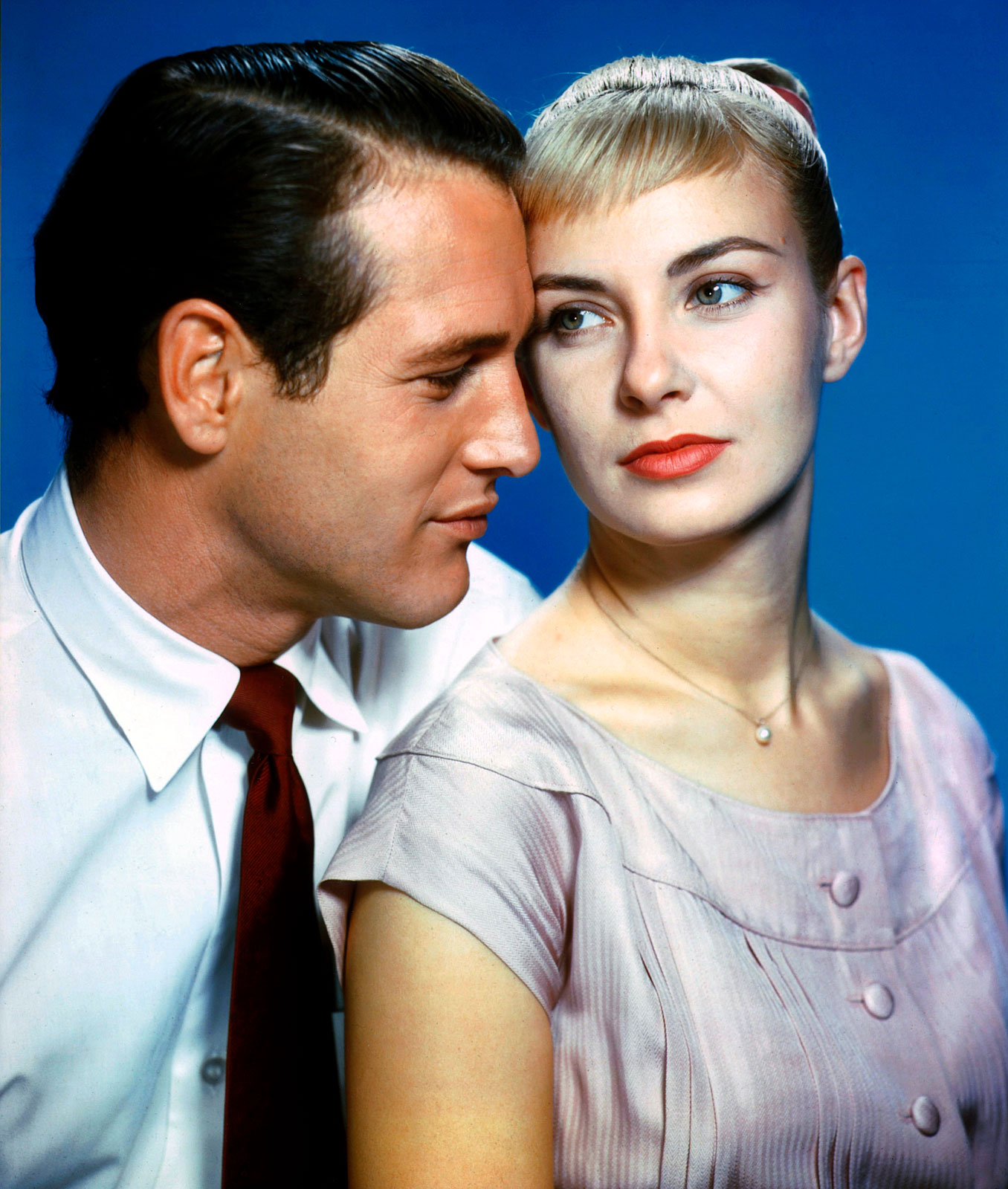
Publicity portrait for the film, featuring Paul Newman and Joanne Woodward

Time described Newman's performance as "mean and keen as a cackle-edge scythe". The publication also praised Woodward, stating her acting was delivered with "fire and grace not often seen in a movie queen", but decried Welles's acting as "scarcely an improvement" on his performance in his previous role, in Moby Dick.

Variety called it "a simmering story of life in the Deep South, steamy with sex and laced with violence and bawdy humor... a kind of Peyton Place with the action shifted from New England". It praised the scriptwriters for the successful merging of the three Faulkner stories that inspired the film. The review also praised Martin Ritt, the camerawork by Joseph LaShelle, and the film's musical score.

Cosmopolitan called the movie a "gutsy melodrama".

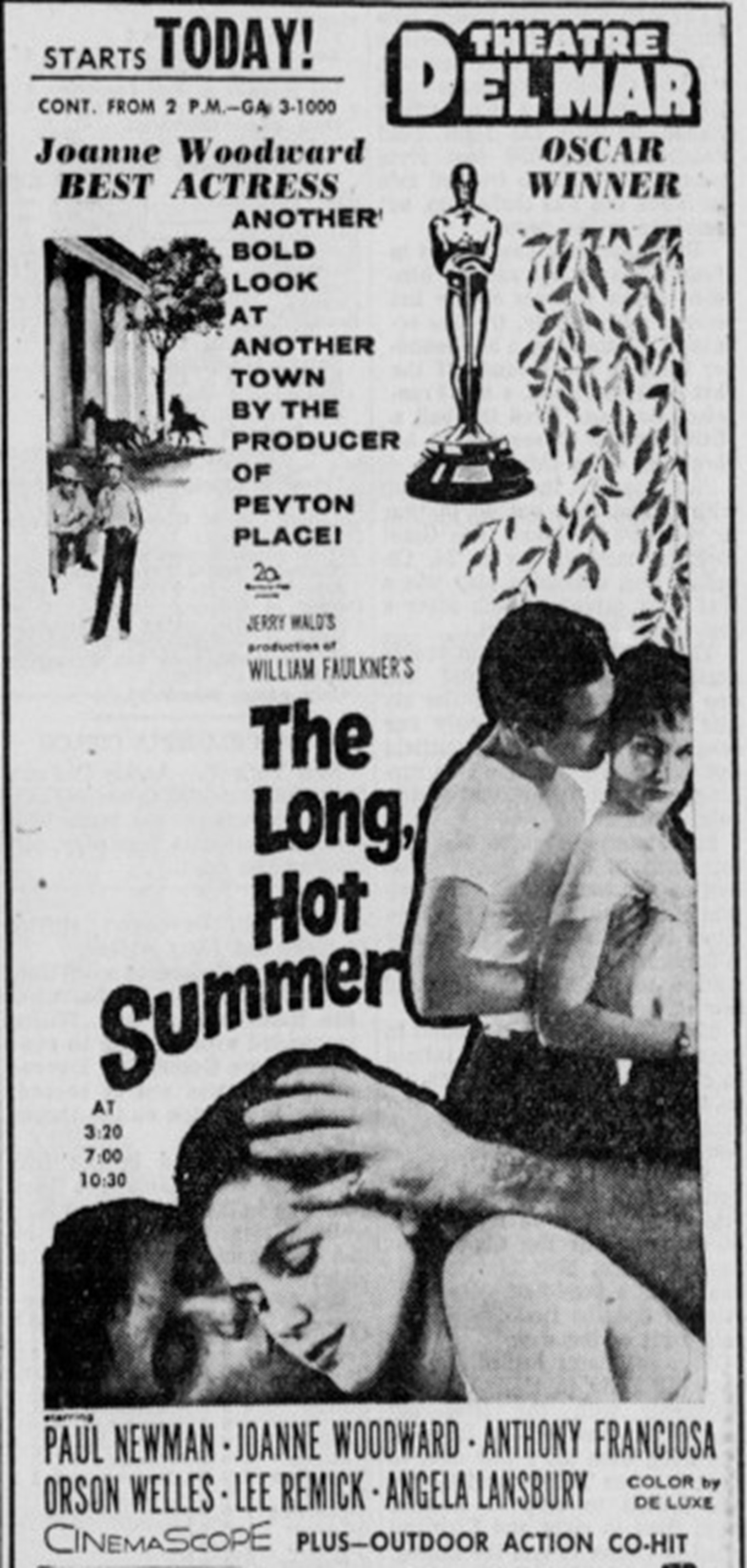
Advertisement from 1958

For The New York Times, critic Bosley Crowther noted Ravetch and Frank's "tight, word-cracking" script that featured fast-paced scenes with "slashing dialogue". The reviewer felt that the cast was "clicking nicely" until the story of the writers "plunged" from the dramatic scenes to "sheer story-telling make-believe", while Crowther concluded that it went from "superb" to a "senseless, flabby heap". The Los Angeles Times opened its review qualifying the movie as "provocative, evocative". While critic Phillip K. Scheuer failed to see the plot's relation to The Hamlet, he praised the work of writers Ravetch and Frank, as well as the "exacting direction" of Ritt. Scheuer perceived the southern accents of the cast and the use of redness on their make-up to be unauthentic, but he felt that the use of the Louisiana landscapes and the development of the characters gave the film a "comulative bite" and a "powerful persuader" that "you are there". The review described Welles' acting as "terrific" and as dominating of the plot, while it favored Newman, Woodward and the supporting cast. Closing the piece, Scheuer wrote that he could not "get the sense" of the ending, while it mentioned as "top credits" the contributions of North on the soundtrack and Lashelle's camerawork.

The Miami Herald pointed that the story did not resemble Faulkner's work excepting his use of "lusty accessories". The reviewer implied that most moviegoers would be not familiar with the work of Faulkner, while he remarked that the film would be "perfectly satisfactory". The piece closed by again criticizing the producers that felt that "Louisiana looked more than Mississippi than Mississippi does", and the newspaper took it as an example of the "liberties" taken with Faulkner's work.The Memphis Press-Scimitar welcomed Welles' performance as "superb", while it also remarked the large difference between the original stories and the movie. Also in Memphis, The Commercial Appeal defined The Long, Hot Summer as a "sizzler", that showed a "superior" performance by Woodward, as well as a "stellar" cast. The piece determined that the "tempestuous, earthy" plotline would not be suitable for the "immature", rather for the "adult" that would find it to be a "dynamic drama" for the "swirling turbulence" of the Varner family and the "frank omnipresence of sex". The Austin American-Statesman considered that Welles represented "one of the picture's more entertaining features" that made the film "gripping", along with the "able performances" and "crisp dialogue".

For the New York Daily News, Kate Cameron gave The Long, Hot Summer four stars. She described the work of the writers in integrating Faulkner's three works as a "fascinating saga". Cameron called the cast "first rate", with a "smoothly and convincingly" direction by Ritt. The Chicago Tribune wrote that the movie had a "first rate" cast, praised the photography and defined the result as "engrossing entertainment". The Boston Globe defined the location as "authentic", while the reviewer felt that the plot "has bite" and its pace advanced as "a race horse". The newspaper hailed Woodward's interpretation of the character as "a polished perfection of understanding". The Cincinnati Enquirer opened stating that doubts regarding Woodward's acting "are put at rest" with the release that it called "adult theater".

=== Accolades ===
Institution	Year	Category	Nominee	Result
Cannes Film Festival	1958	Palme d'Or	Martin Ritt	Nominated
Cannes Film Festival	1958	Best Actor	Paul Newman	Won
Directors Guild of America	1959	Outstanding Directorial Achievement in Motion Pictures	Martin Ritt	Nominated
National Board of Review	1958	Top Ten Films	—N/a	Won
Writers Guild of America	1959	Best Written American Drama	Irving Ravetch, Harriet Frank Jr.	Nominated

== Soundtrack ==
The Long Hot Summer

Soundtrack album by Jimmie Rodgers, Alex North, Lionel Newman
- Released: June 1958
- Length: 35:58
- Label: Roulette Records

"The Long, Hot Summer" song
- Audio sample featuring vocal by Jimmie Rodgers: file; help

Alex North composed the film's score, which leaned toward a jazz style. "The Long Hot Summer" was the only song written by North to be used as the title track of a film. Composed in an AABA form, it was characterized by its lyricisms and its "tense dissonant" jazz-figures. The lyrics of the song were written by Sammy Cahn, while instrumental variations of the melody were used throughout the film, underlining the progression of the relationship between Ben and Clara. Recorded by Jimmie Rodgers, it was released by Roulette Records, reaching number 77 on Billboard's Top 100 Sides in June 1958. The orchestra was conducted by Lionel Newman.

Billboard described the soundtrack as "a model of music use in a dramatic film". On another review, Billboard favored the album, stating that it "makes for good listening out of the cinematic context" and that the financial success of the soundtrack may have been propelled by Jimmie Rodgers' "smooth vocal treatment". The publication praised North's musical understanding of the deep South, and particularly praised the song "Eula", describing it as a "pure gem of sex-on-wax".

Track listing
No.	Title	Length
1.	"The Long, Hot Summer"	2:26
2.	"Ashamed – Gentlemen"	6:04
3.	"Two Butterflies"	2:30
4.	"The Lynchers – The Barn Burns – Joy"	4:50
5.	"Big Daddy – Crushed"	1:55
6.	"Eula"	3:20
7.	"Barn Burners"	4:50
8.	"Loot – Respect"	4:40
9.	"Encounter"	2:05
10.	"The Long, Hot Summer – Summertime"	3:18

== Television adaptations ==
=== 1965 series ===
A TV series based on the film aired on ABC between 1965 and 1966, featuring Dan O'Herlihy, Roy Thinnes, Nancy Malone, Lana Wood, Ruth Roman, and Edmond O'Brien.

=== 1985 film ===
It was remade for television by NBC in 1985, featuring Jason Robards, Don Johnson, and Cybill Shepherd. This rendition received two Emmy nominations, for Outstanding Miniseries and Outstanding Art Direction for a Miniseries or a Special.

== See also ==
- List of American films of 1958

== Bibliography ==
- Adams, Marjory (April 5, 1958). "Oscar Winner is Star: Joanne Woodward at Memorial". Amusements. The Boston Globe. Vol. 173, no. 95 – via Newspapers.com.
- Anderson, Jack (April 8, 1958). "'Long, Hot Summer' Sizzless with Torrid Story". The Miami Herald. Vol. 48, no. 127 – via Newspapers.com.
- Billboard Staff (June 8, 1958). "Top 100 Sides". Billboard. Vol. 70, no. 26. ISSN 0006-2510.
- Billboard Staff (2) (June 2, 1958). "Album Reviews". Billboard. ISSN 0006-2510.
- Benard, Jami (2005). The X List: The National Society of Film Critics' Guide to the Movies That Turn Us On. Da Capo Press. ISBN 978-0-306-81445-7.
- Buhle, Paul; Wagner, Dave (2003). Hide in Plain Sight: The Hollywood Blacklistees in Film and Television, 1950–2002. Palgrave Macmillan. ISBN 978-1-4039-6144-0.
- Bustin, John (April 18, 1958). "Show World". Austin-American Statesman. Vol. 87, no. 225 – via Newspapers.com.
- Cameron, Kate (April 4, 1958). "'Long, Hot Summer' Honey of a Picture". New York Daily News. Vol. 9, no. 243 – via Newspapers.com.
- Cornelison, Pam; Yanak, Ted (2004). The Great American History Fact-Finder: The Who, What, Where, When, and Why of American History. Houghton Mifflin Harcourt. ISBN 978-0-618-43941-6.
- Crowther, Bosley (April 4, 1958). "The Screen: 'The Long, Hot Summer'". The New York Times. Vol. 107, no. 36, 595.
- iTunes staff (2008). "The Long, Hot Summer (Original Film Soundtrack)". iTunes. Apple Corporation.
- Gilliam, Richard (2013). "The Long, Hot Summer review". All Movie.
- Howard, Ewin (April 5, 1958). "Faulkner Novel Basis for One of 3 New Downtown Films". The Memphis Press-Scimitar. Vol. 78, no. 132 – via Newspapers.com.
- Jackson, Carlton (1994). Picking Up the Tab: The Life and Movies of Martin Ritt. Popular Press. ISBN 978-0-87972-672-0.
- Lax, Eric (1996). Paul Newman: A Biography. Turner Publishing. ISBN 978-1-57036-286-6.
- Lenderson, Sanya; Williams, John (2009). Alex North, Film Composer. McFarland. ISBN 978-0-7864-4333-8.
- Life magazine staff (February 24, 1958). "The Return of Awesome Welles". Life. Vol. 44, no. 8. ISSN 0024-3019.
- Leonard, William (April 6, 1958). "Oscar Winner Tops March's Best Movies". Part 7. Chicago Tribune. Vol. 117, no. 14 – via Newspapers.com.
- Latham, Caroline (1985). Miami Magic. Kensington Publishing Corporation. ISBN 978-0-8217-1800-1.
- Lisante, Tom (2000). Fantasy Femmes of 60s Cinema: Interviews With 20 Actresses from Biker, Beach, and Elvis Movies. McFarland. ISBN 978-0-7864-0868-9.
- Matelski, Marilyn (1991). "Variety: Film, Video, Theatre, Music". Variety : Film, Video, Theatre, Music : The Year in Review. Focal Press. ISSN 0959-1486.
- Miller, Gabriel (2000). The Films of Martin Ritt: Fanfare for the Common Man. University Press of Mississippi. ISBN 978-1-61703-496-1.
- Miller, Gabriel (2003). Martin Ritt: Interviews. Univ. Press of Mississippi. ISBN 978-1-57806-433-5.
- Palmer, William; Bray, William Robert (2009). Hollywood's Tennessee: The Williams Films and Postwar America. University of Texas Press. ISBN 978-0-292-71921-7.
- Quirk, Lawrence (2009). Paul Newman: A Life. Taylor Trade Publications. ISBN 978-1-58979-438-2.
- Schwartz, Richard (2009). The 1950s. Infobase Publishing. ISBN 978-1-4381-0876-6.
- Sinclair, Charles (April 14, 1958). "Reviewed in Brief". Billboard. Vol. 70, no. 18. ISSN 0006-2510.
- Solomon, Aubrey (1989). Twentieth Century Fox: A Corporate and Financial History (The Scarecrow Filmmakers Series). Scarecrow Press. ISBN 978-0-8108-4244-1.
- Soundtrack Collector staff (2006). "Long, Hot Summer, The (1958)". Soundtrack Collector. C&C Concept and Creation.
- United States Congress (2009). Congressional Record: Proceedings and Debates of the 110th Congress. Government Printing Office.
- Parker, Ben (April 4, 1958). "'Long, Hot Summer' Sizzles; Well-Cast Tale of Mississippi". The Commercial Appeal. Vol. 119, no. 94 – via Newspapers.com.
- Pryor, Thomas (July 27, 1958). "Hollywood Scene: Jerry Wald Presents His Treasurer's Report – Blaustein's 'Horsemen'". The New York Times. p. X5.
- Radcliffe, E. B. (April 2, 1958). "Joanne Holds Her Own With Welles". The Cincinnati Enquirer. Vol. 117, no. 358 – via Newspapers.com.
- Scheuer, Phillip K. (March 14, 1958). "'Hot Summer' Plumbs Dixie". Part III. Los Angeles Times. Vol. LXXVII – via Newspapers.com.
- Weales, Gerard (1958). "Movie Reviews". The Reporter. Vol. 18.
