= List of minor planets: 534001–535000 =

The following is a partial list of minor planets, running from minor-planet number 534001 through 535000, inclusive. The primary data for this and other partial lists is based on JPL's "Small-Body Orbital Elements" and data available from the Minor Planet Center. Critical list information is also provided by the MPC, unless otherwise specified from Lowell Observatory. A detailed description of the table's columns and additional sources are given on the main page including a complete list of every page in this series, and a statistical break-up on the dynamical classification of minor planets.

Also see the summary list of all named bodies in numerical and alphabetical order, and the corresponding naming citations for the number range of this particular list. New namings may only be added to this list after official publication, as the preannouncement of names is condemned by the Working Group for Small Bodies Nomenclature of the International Astronomical Union.

Near-Earth obj.	MBA (inner)	MBA (outer)	Centaur
Mars-crosser	MBA (middle)	Jupiter trojan	Trans-Neptunian obj.
Unclassified

== 534001–534100 ==
Designation			Discovery			Properties		Ref
Permanent	Provisional	Named after	Date	Site	Discoverer(s)	Category	Diam.	Ref
534001	2014 QV_{285}	—	August 25, 2014	Haleakala	Pan-STARRS 1	PHO	840 m	MPC · JPL
534002	2014 QA_{295}	—	November 25, 2011	Haleakala	Pan-STARRS 1	PHO	750 m	MPC · JPL
534003	2014 QB_{300}	—	July 7, 2014	Haleakala	Pan-STARRS 1	MAS	580 m	MPC · JPL
534004	2014 QC_{301}	—	November 11, 2007	Mount Lemmon	Mount Lemmon Survey	·	1.2 km	MPC · JPL
534005	2014 QJ_{307}	—	November 20, 2003	Kitt Peak	Spacewatch	NYS	1.1 km	MPC · JPL
534006	2014 QZ_{307}	—	July 29, 2014	Haleakala	Pan-STARRS 1	NYS	950 m	MPC · JPL
534007	2014 QF_{309}	—	July 7, 2014	Haleakala	Pan-STARRS 1	·	700 m	MPC · JPL
534008	2014 QC_{311}	—	August 25, 2014	Kitt Peak	Spacewatch	PHO	900 m	MPC · JPL
534009	2014 QC_{313}	—	September 18, 2003	Kitt Peak	Spacewatch	NYS	760 m	MPC · JPL
534010	2014 QF_{323}	—	August 25, 2014	Haleakala	Pan-STARRS 1	·	960 m	MPC · JPL
534011	2014 QE_{326}	—	October 20, 2003	Kitt Peak	Spacewatch	·	920 m	MPC · JPL
534012	2014 QL_{326}	—	October 10, 2010	Mount Lemmon	Mount Lemmon Survey	·	790 m	MPC · JPL
534013	2014 QM_{328}	—	August 25, 2014	Haleakala	Pan-STARRS 1	·	860 m	MPC · JPL
534014	2014 QS_{329}	—	August 25, 2014	Haleakala	Pan-STARRS 1	·	1.1 km	MPC · JPL
534015	2014 QH_{330}	—	August 25, 2014	Haleakala	Pan-STARRS 1	·	1.1 km	MPC · JPL
534016	2014 QX_{330}	—	October 10, 2007	Catalina	CSS	·	650 m	MPC · JPL
534017	2014 QD_{331}	—	August 25, 2014	Haleakala	Pan-STARRS 1	·	870 m	MPC · JPL
534018	2014 QH_{331}	—	September 20, 2006	Catalina	CSS	·	1.2 km	MPC · JPL
534019	2014 QC_{338}	—	October 19, 2007	Anderson Mesa	LONEOS	·	900 m	MPC · JPL
534020	2014 QR_{339}	—	September 11, 2004	Kitt Peak	Spacewatch	·	760 m	MPC · JPL
534021	2014 QG_{340}	—	September 10, 2007	Mount Lemmon	Mount Lemmon Survey	·	710 m	MPC · JPL
534022	2014 QK_{342}	—	September 12, 2007	Mount Lemmon	Mount Lemmon Survey	·	550 m	MPC · JPL
534023	2014 QD_{350}	—	August 20, 2014	Haleakala	Pan-STARRS 1	·	1.1 km	MPC · JPL
534024	2014 QH_{350}	—	September 13, 2007	Mount Lemmon	Mount Lemmon Survey	NYS	630 m	MPC · JPL
534025	2014 QC_{352}	—	November 26, 2003	Kitt Peak	Spacewatch	(6769)	870 m	MPC · JPL
534026	2014 QN_{354}	—	December 29, 2011	Mount Lemmon	Mount Lemmon Survey	V	670 m	MPC · JPL
534027	2014 QH_{357}	—	February 16, 2012	Haleakala	Pan-STARRS 1	·	1.3 km	MPC · JPL
534028	2014 QP_{361}	—	October 2, 2010	Kitt Peak	Spacewatch	·	1.5 km	MPC · JPL
534029	2014 QX_{361}	—	June 30, 2014	Haleakala	Pan-STARRS 1	·	1.1 km	MPC · JPL
534030	2014 QJ_{366}	—	December 19, 2007	Mount Lemmon	Mount Lemmon Survey	·	810 m	MPC · JPL
534031	2014 QS_{366}	—	January 19, 2004	Kitt Peak	Spacewatch	·	920 m	MPC · JPL
534032	2014 QY_{366}	—	August 25, 2014	Haleakala	Pan-STARRS 1	V	610 m	MPC · JPL
534033	2014 QE_{367}	—	October 28, 2010	Mount Lemmon	Mount Lemmon Survey	(5)	940 m	MPC · JPL
534034	2014 QG_{371}	—	October 9, 2010	Mount Lemmon	Mount Lemmon Survey	·	770 m	MPC · JPL
534035	2014 QT_{373}	—	July 31, 2014	Haleakala	Pan-STARRS 1	·	710 m	MPC · JPL
534036	2014 QA_{374}	—	February 15, 2012	Haleakala	Pan-STARRS 1	·	1.5 km	MPC · JPL
534037	2014 QR_{375}	—	July 27, 2014	Haleakala	Pan-STARRS 1	·	910 m	MPC · JPL
534038	2014 QB_{380}	—	June 13, 2010	Mount Lemmon	Mount Lemmon Survey	·	950 m	MPC · JPL
534039	2014 QR_{380}	—	July 27, 2014	Haleakala	Pan-STARRS 1	·	940 m	MPC · JPL
534040	2014 QX_{382}	—	September 12, 2007	Mount Lemmon	Mount Lemmon Survey	·	760 m	MPC · JPL
534041	2014 QP_{386}	—	August 29, 2014	Mount Lemmon	Mount Lemmon Survey	ADE	1.9 km	MPC · JPL
534042	2014 QX_{388}	—	August 30, 2014	Catalina	CSS	·	1.0 km	MPC · JPL
534043	2014 QF_{389}	—	November 19, 2003	Kitt Peak	Spacewatch	·	970 m	MPC · JPL
534044	2014 QM_{392}	—	December 22, 2008	Mount Lemmon	Mount Lemmon Survey	·	2.0 km	MPC · JPL
534045	2014 QE_{393}	—	September 30, 2003	Kitt Peak	Spacewatch	MAS	630 m	MPC · JPL
534046	2014 QH_{398}	—	September 19, 2003	Kitt Peak	Spacewatch	·	1.1 km	MPC · JPL
534047	2014 QJ_{400}	—	October 15, 2007	Mount Lemmon	Mount Lemmon Survey	·	590 m	MPC · JPL
534048	2014 QY_{404}	—	August 28, 2014	Haleakala	Pan-STARRS 1	·	1.6 km	MPC · JPL
534049	2014 QA_{406}	—	September 12, 2007	Kitt Peak	Spacewatch	·	710 m	MPC · JPL
534050	2014 QR_{407}	—	September 14, 2007	Mount Lemmon	Mount Lemmon Survey	·	530 m	MPC · JPL
534051	2014 QB_{408}	—	May 31, 2014	Haleakala	Pan-STARRS 1	·	1.3 km	MPC · JPL
534052	2014 QJ_{408}	—	May 31, 2014	Haleakala	Pan-STARRS 1	·	1.5 km	MPC · JPL
534053	2014 QX_{408}	—	December 14, 2006	Mount Lemmon	Mount Lemmon Survey	·	1.0 km	MPC · JPL
534054	2014 QW_{410}	—	July 7, 2014	Haleakala	Pan-STARRS 1	·	700 m	MPC · JPL
534055	2014 QG_{413}	—	December 15, 2007	Kitt Peak	Spacewatch	·	1 km	MPC · JPL
534056	2014 QP_{414}	—	February 19, 2009	Kitt Peak	Spacewatch	·	1.2 km	MPC · JPL
534057	2014 QP_{415}	—	June 28, 2014	Haleakala	Pan-STARRS 1	PHO	870 m	MPC · JPL
534058	2014 QE_{420}	—	July 7, 2014	Haleakala	Pan-STARRS 1	MAS	580 m	MPC · JPL
534059	2014 QF_{420}	—	August 20, 2014	Haleakala	Pan-STARRS 1	·	960 m	MPC · JPL
534060	2014 QR_{420}	—	July 31, 2014	Haleakala	Pan-STARRS 1	·	860 m	MPC · JPL
534061	2014 QY_{420}	—	January 18, 2005	Kitt Peak	Spacewatch	·	780 m	MPC · JPL
534062	2014 QB_{421}	—	September 11, 2010	Mount Lemmon	Mount Lemmon Survey	·	1.3 km	MPC · JPL
534063	2014 QH_{423}	—	August 4, 2014	Haleakala	Pan-STARRS 1	·	1.0 km	MPC · JPL
534064	2014 QU_{426}	—	October 19, 2003	Kitt Peak	Spacewatch	V	490 m	MPC · JPL
534065	2014 QG_{432}	—	September 8, 2007	Mount Lemmon	Mount Lemmon Survey	·	670 m	MPC · JPL
534066	2014 QQ_{437}	—	August 31, 2014	Haleakala	Pan-STARRS 1	·	1.7 km	MPC · JPL
534067	2014 QW_{437}	—	March 6, 2008	Mount Lemmon	Mount Lemmon Survey	·	1.1 km	MPC · JPL
534068	2014 QB_{438}	—	May 12, 2013	Haleakala	Pan-STARRS 1	·	660 m	MPC · JPL
534069	2014 QD_{438}	—	January 18, 2008	Mount Lemmon	Mount Lemmon Survey	·	1.3 km	MPC · JPL
534070	2014 QO_{438}	—	January 11, 2011	Catalina	CSS	·	1.4 km	MPC · JPL
534071	2014 QX_{438}	—	November 10, 2010	Mount Lemmon	Mount Lemmon Survey	·	1.9 km	MPC · JPL
534072	2014 QA_{439}	—	December 1, 2006	Kitt Peak	Spacewatch	·	810 m	MPC · JPL
534073	2014 QL_{441}	—	August 18, 2014	Cerro Tololo	DECam	SDO	187 km	MPC · JPL
534074	2014 QZ_{441}	—	August 28, 2014	Haleakala	Pan-STARRS 1	res · 3:5	241 km	MPC · JPL
534075	2014 QN_{447}	—	October 15, 2007	Mount Lemmon	Mount Lemmon Survey	·	1.2 km	MPC · JPL
534076	2014 QV_{447}	—	August 23, 2014	Haleakala	Pan-STARRS 1	V	450 m	MPC · JPL
534077	2014 QW_{447}	—	November 2, 2007	Mount Lemmon	Mount Lemmon Survey	V	480 m	MPC · JPL
534078	2014 QB_{449}	—	May 9, 2006	Mount Lemmon	Mount Lemmon Survey	·	810 m	MPC · JPL
534079	2014 QP_{449}	—	October 21, 2006	Catalina	CSS	·	1.4 km	MPC · JPL
534080	2014 QY_{449}	—	March 1, 2008	Kitt Peak	Spacewatch	·	920 m	MPC · JPL
534081	2014 QM_{450}	—	November 6, 2010	Mount Lemmon	Mount Lemmon Survey	·	920 m	MPC · JPL
534082	2014 QQ_{450}	—	April 10, 2013	Haleakala	Pan-STARRS 1	V	480 m	MPC · JPL
534083	2014 QS_{451}	—	August 20, 2014	Haleakala	Pan-STARRS 1	·	980 m	MPC · JPL
534084	2014 QV_{451}	—	December 19, 2007	Mount Lemmon	Mount Lemmon Survey	·	1.5 km	MPC · JPL
534085	2014 QE_{452}	—	August 25, 2014	Haleakala	Pan-STARRS 1	MAR	860 m	MPC · JPL
534086	2014 QJ_{452}	—	August 27, 2014	Haleakala	Pan-STARRS 1	·	810 m	MPC · JPL
534087	2014 QM_{454}	—	August 28, 2014	Haleakala	Pan-STARRS 1	·	1.1 km	MPC · JPL
534088	2014 QT_{454}	—	April 21, 2013	Mount Lemmon	Mount Lemmon Survey	·	740 m	MPC · JPL
534089	2014 QJ_{455}	—	August 22, 2014	Haleakala	Pan-STARRS 1	MAR	930 m	MPC · JPL
534090	2014 QP_{456}	—	October 11, 2007	Kitt Peak	Spacewatch	·	1.2 km	MPC · JPL
534091	2014 QU_{456}	—	February 13, 2009	Kitt Peak	Spacewatch	V	420 m	MPC · JPL
534092	2014 QR_{457}	—	February 7, 2002	Kitt Peak	Spacewatch	V	540 m	MPC · JPL
534093	2014 QZ_{457}	—	September 27, 2006	Mount Lemmon	Mount Lemmon Survey	·	950 m	MPC · JPL
534094	2014 QE_{458}	—	November 9, 2007	Kitt Peak	Spacewatch	·	1.0 km	MPC · JPL
534095	2014 QP_{458}	—	August 18, 2014	Haleakala	Pan-STARRS 1	·	870 m	MPC · JPL
534096	2014 QM_{461}	—	March 19, 2013	Haleakala	Pan-STARRS 1	·	1.1 km	MPC · JPL
534097	2014 QD_{466}	—	August 25, 2014	Haleakala	Pan-STARRS 1	·	1.0 km	MPC · JPL
534098	2014 QB_{467}	—	August 25, 2014	Haleakala	Pan-STARRS 1	·	980 m	MPC · JPL
534099	2014 QD_{468}	—	November 2, 2007	Mount Lemmon	Mount Lemmon Survey	·	1.0 km	MPC · JPL
534100	2014 QF_{468}	—	August 27, 2014	Haleakala	Pan-STARRS 1	·	890 m	MPC · JPL

== 534101–534200 ==
back to top

Designation			Discovery			Properties		Ref
Permanent	Provisional	Named after	Date	Site	Discoverer(s)	Category	Diam.	Ref
534101	2014 QS_{470}	—	September 18, 2010	Mount Lemmon	Mount Lemmon Survey	·	830 m	MPC · JPL
534102	2014 QU_{470}	—	October 25, 2008	Mount Lemmon	Mount Lemmon Survey	·	1.2 km	MPC · JPL
534103	2014 QZ_{471}	—	August 30, 2014	Haleakala	Pan-STARRS 1	·	830 m	MPC · JPL
534104	2014 QD_{472}	—	August 30, 2014	Haleakala	Pan-STARRS 1	MAR	840 m	MPC · JPL
534105	2014 QP_{473}	—	March 5, 2008	Kitt Peak	Spacewatch	MAR	750 m	MPC · JPL
534106	2014 QR_{473}	—	December 26, 2011	Mount Lemmon	Mount Lemmon Survey	V	660 m	MPC · JPL
534107	2014 QC_{474}	—	August 31, 2014	Haleakala	Pan-STARRS 1	·	1.3 km	MPC · JPL
534108	2014 QV_{475}	—	September 10, 2007	Kitt Peak	Spacewatch	·	1.1 km	MPC · JPL
534109	2014 QD_{476}	—	March 5, 2013	Mount Lemmon	Mount Lemmon Survey	·	650 m	MPC · JPL
534110	2014 QS_{476}	—	November 27, 2011	Mount Lemmon	Mount Lemmon Survey	PHO	1.1 km	MPC · JPL
534111	2014 QK_{477}	—	October 24, 2011	Haleakala	Pan-STARRS 1	·	960 m	MPC · JPL
534112	2014 QF_{478}	—	May 3, 2005	Kitt Peak	Spacewatch	·	1.1 km	MPC · JPL
534113	2014 QE_{481}	—	September 11, 2007	Mount Lemmon	Mount Lemmon Survey	·	650 m	MPC · JPL
534114	2014 QT_{482}	—	October 15, 2007	Kitt Peak	Spacewatch	·	840 m	MPC · JPL
534115	2014 QV_{482}	—	November 23, 2003	Kitt Peak	Spacewatch	NYS	1.2 km	MPC · JPL
534116	2014 QV_{484}	—	September 13, 2007	Mount Lemmon	Mount Lemmon Survey	·	640 m	MPC · JPL
534117	2014 QW_{484}	—	April 24, 2006	Kitt Peak	Spacewatch	NYS	960 m	MPC · JPL
534118	2014 QA_{485}	—	January 16, 2005	Kitt Peak	Spacewatch	·	1.2 km	MPC · JPL
534119	2014 QA_{486}	—	January 29, 2009	Mount Lemmon	Mount Lemmon Survey	·	1.3 km	MPC · JPL
534120	2014 QO_{486}	—	April 4, 2010	Catalina	CSS	·	660 m	MPC · JPL
534121	2014 QQ_{487}	—	December 22, 2008	Kitt Peak	Spacewatch	·	740 m	MPC · JPL
534122	2014 QU_{488}	—	September 27, 1992	Kitt Peak	Spacewatch	MAS	570 m	MPC · JPL
534123	2014 QA_{489}	—	November 26, 2003	Kitt Peak	Spacewatch	MAS	510 m	MPC · JPL
534124	2014 QN_{489}	—	December 3, 2007	Kitt Peak	Spacewatch	MAS	710 m	MPC · JPL
534125	2014 QS_{489}	—	July 7, 2014	Haleakala	Pan-STARRS 1	·	960 m	MPC · JPL
534126	2014 QG_{492}	—	December 19, 2007	Kitt Peak	Spacewatch	·	1.1 km	MPC · JPL
534127	2014 QK_{493}	—	October 28, 1997	Kitt Peak	Spacewatch	·	670 m	MPC · JPL
534128	2014 QW_{494}	—	October 11, 2007	Mount Lemmon	Mount Lemmon Survey	·	1.1 km	MPC · JPL
534129	2014 QA_{495}	—	February 4, 2005	Mount Lemmon	Mount Lemmon Survey	·	690 m	MPC · JPL
534130	2014 QJ_{495}	—	August 30, 2014	Haleakala	Pan-STARRS 1	·	980 m	MPC · JPL
534131	2014 QM_{495}	—	August 20, 2014	Haleakala	Pan-STARRS 1	·	930 m	MPC · JPL
534132	2014 QN_{495}	—	August 25, 2014	Haleakala	Pan-STARRS 1	·	1.3 km	MPC · JPL
534133	2014 QS_{495}	—	August 30, 2014	Haleakala	Pan-STARRS 1	·	980 m	MPC · JPL
534134	2014 RW_{4}	—	November 12, 2007	Mount Lemmon	Mount Lemmon Survey	·	890 m	MPC · JPL
534135	2014 RJ_{12}	—	August 9, 2010	WISE	WISE	·	1.1 km	MPC · JPL
534136	2014 RA_{13}	—	September 4, 2014	Haleakala	Pan-STARRS 1	·	1.3 km	MPC · JPL
534137	2014 RG_{16}	—	June 30, 2014	Haleakala	Pan-STARRS 1	·	1.3 km	MPC · JPL
534138	2014 RO_{16}	—	January 18, 2012	Mount Lemmon	Mount Lemmon Survey	·	590 m	MPC · JPL
534139	2014 RH_{18}	—	September 13, 2014	Haleakala	Pan-STARRS 1	PHO	1.1 km	MPC · JPL
534140	2014 RR_{18}	—	December 16, 2009	Catalina	CSS	T_{j} (2.98) · EUP	3.9 km	MPC · JPL
534141	2014 RL_{19}	—	November 2, 2010	Kitt Peak	Spacewatch	(5)	1.2 km	MPC · JPL
534142	2014 RB_{20}	—	November 8, 2007	Kitt Peak	Spacewatch	·	740 m	MPC · JPL
534143	2014 RE_{23}	—	June 28, 2014	Haleakala	Pan-STARRS 1	V	490 m	MPC · JPL
534144	2014 RZ_{32}	—	June 15, 2010	Mount Lemmon	Mount Lemmon Survey	·	1.3 km	MPC · JPL
534145	2014 RX_{35}	—	July 7, 2014	Haleakala	Pan-STARRS 1	·	1.1 km	MPC · JPL
534146	2014 RB_{36}	—	May 16, 2010	La Sagra	OAM	(2076)	850 m	MPC · JPL
534147	2014 RE_{39}	—	February 14, 2012	Haleakala	Pan-STARRS 1	·	990 m	MPC · JPL
534148	2014 RN_{39}	—	September 28, 2003	Kitt Peak	Spacewatch	·	1.0 km	MPC · JPL
534149	2014 RX_{39}	—	September 19, 2003	Kitt Peak	Spacewatch	·	660 m	MPC · JPL
534150	2014 RQ_{40}	—	April 9, 2006	Mount Lemmon	Mount Lemmon Survey	·	1.1 km	MPC · JPL
534151	2014 RK_{41}	—	September 11, 2007	Kitt Peak	Spacewatch	·	990 m	MPC · JPL
534152	2014 RU_{41}	—	April 8, 2006	Kitt Peak	Spacewatch	·	890 m	MPC · JPL
534153	2014 RG_{47}	—	September 19, 1995	Kitt Peak	Spacewatch	NYS	1.0 km	MPC · JPL
534154	2014 RB_{48}	—	July 29, 2014	Haleakala	Pan-STARRS 1	NYS	1.0 km	MPC · JPL
534155	2014 RD_{49}	—	July 4, 1995	Kitt Peak	Spacewatch	·	1.1 km	MPC · JPL
534156	2014 RE_{49}	—	January 1, 2008	Kitt Peak	Spacewatch	·	1.1 km	MPC · JPL
534157	2014 RV_{49}	—	November 3, 1999	Kitt Peak	Spacewatch	NYS	780 m	MPC · JPL
534158	2014 RQ_{57}	—	July 27, 2014	Haleakala	Pan-STARRS 1	·	920 m	MPC · JPL
534159	2014 RD_{62}	—	April 11, 2010	WISE	WISE	·	1.5 km	MPC · JPL
534160	2014 RP_{63}	—	October 22, 2006	Mount Lemmon	Mount Lemmon Survey	·	1.5 km	MPC · JPL
534161	2014 RQ_{63}	—	September 4, 2014	Haleakala	Pan-STARRS 1	plutino	166 km	MPC · JPL
534162	2014 RU_{64}	—	August 6, 2005	Siding Spring	SSS	·	1.7 km	MPC · JPL
534163	2014 RW_{64}	—	September 4, 2014	Haleakala	Pan-STARRS 1	·	1.2 km	MPC · JPL
534164	2014 RA_{65}	—	October 5, 2005	Catalina	CSS	·	1.6 km	MPC · JPL
534165	2014 RM_{65}	—	September 2, 2014	Haleakala	Pan-STARRS 1	·	950 m	MPC · JPL
534166	2014 RN_{65}	—	March 28, 2008	Mount Lemmon	Mount Lemmon Survey	(5)	990 m	MPC · JPL
534167	2014 RS_{65}	—	December 10, 2010	Mount Lemmon	Mount Lemmon Survey	·	1.1 km	MPC · JPL
534168	2014 RU_{65}	—	March 6, 2008	Mount Lemmon	Mount Lemmon Survey	·	1.3 km	MPC · JPL
534169	2014 RV_{65}	—	February 29, 2008	Kitt Peak	Spacewatch	·	1.3 km	MPC · JPL
534170	2014 RX_{65}	—	June 1, 2009	Mount Lemmon	Mount Lemmon Survey	MAR	900 m	MPC · JPL
534171	2014 RQ_{66}	—	September 4, 2014	Haleakala	Pan-STARRS 1	·	1.5 km	MPC · JPL
534172	2014 RW_{66}	—	November 16, 2006	Mount Lemmon	Mount Lemmon Survey	·	1.2 km	MPC · JPL
534173	2014 RJ_{67}	—	September 2, 2014	Haleakala	Pan-STARRS 1	MAR	650 m	MPC · JPL
534174	2014 RX_{68}	—	May 9, 2013	Haleakala	Pan-STARRS 1	·	1.2 km	MPC · JPL
534175	2014 RL_{69}	—	September 13, 2014	Haleakala	Pan-STARRS 1	·	910 m	MPC · JPL
534176	2014 RS_{69}	—	April 26, 2006	Kitt Peak	Spacewatch	V	600 m	MPC · JPL
534177	2014 RX_{69}	—	September 2, 2014	Haleakala	Pan-STARRS 1	·	620 m	MPC · JPL
534178	2014 RY_{69}	—	September 7, 2014	Haleakala	Pan-STARRS 1	·	1.2 km	MPC · JPL
534179	2014 RF_{70}	—	September 14, 2014	Mount Lemmon	Mount Lemmon Survey	·	580 m	MPC · JPL
534180	2014 RG_{70}	—	September 14, 2014	Haleakala	Pan-STARRS 1	·	960 m	MPC · JPL
534181	2014 SW_{1}	—	August 28, 2014	Haleakala	Pan-STARRS 1	·	2.2 km	MPC · JPL
534182	2014 SK_{2}	—	November 2, 2008	Mount Lemmon	Mount Lemmon Survey	·	530 m	MPC · JPL
534183	2014 SH_{13}	—	September 11, 2007	Mount Lemmon	Mount Lemmon Survey	NYS	590 m	MPC · JPL
534184	2014 SY_{14}	—	October 16, 2007	Mount Lemmon	Mount Lemmon Survey	·	790 m	MPC · JPL
534185	2014 SZ_{15}	—	September 18, 2003	Kitt Peak	Spacewatch	CLA	1.2 km	MPC · JPL
534186	2014 SO_{31}	—	October 29, 2003	Kitt Peak	Spacewatch	·	1.2 km	MPC · JPL
534187	2014 SX_{46}	—	July 7, 2014	Haleakala	Pan-STARRS 1	V	580 m	MPC · JPL
534188	2014 SV_{48}	—	September 9, 2007	Mount Lemmon	Mount Lemmon Survey	V	490 m	MPC · JPL
534189	2014 SG_{49}	—	September 30, 2003	Kitt Peak	Spacewatch	MAS	510 m	MPC · JPL
534190	2014 SB_{54}	—	October 25, 2007	Mount Lemmon	Mount Lemmon Survey	·	890 m	MPC · JPL
534191	2014 SA_{56}	—	October 9, 2007	Mount Lemmon	Mount Lemmon Survey	·	910 m	MPC · JPL
534192	2014 SD_{66}	—	October 6, 2008	Mount Lemmon	Mount Lemmon Survey	·	740 m	MPC · JPL
534193	2014 SJ_{76}	—	March 18, 2010	Kitt Peak	Spacewatch	·	630 m	MPC · JPL
534194	2014 SU_{82}	—	November 27, 2011	Mount Lemmon	Mount Lemmon Survey	·	650 m	MPC · JPL
534195	2014 SW_{94}	—	September 17, 2010	Mount Lemmon	Mount Lemmon Survey	(5)	1.0 km	MPC · JPL
534196	2014 SQ_{95}	—	January 19, 2012	Mount Lemmon	Mount Lemmon Survey	V	470 m	MPC · JPL
534197	2014 SZ_{97}	—	September 18, 2014	Haleakala	Pan-STARRS 1	·	860 m	MPC · JPL
534198	2014 SU_{115}	—	August 28, 2014	Haleakala	Pan-STARRS 1	·	1.1 km	MPC · JPL
534199	2014 SK_{123}	—	December 20, 2007	Mount Lemmon	Mount Lemmon Survey	V	600 m	MPC · JPL
534200	2014 SG_{128}	—	November 16, 2011	Mount Lemmon	Mount Lemmon Survey	·	610 m	MPC · JPL

== 534201–534300 ==
back to top

Designation			Discovery			Properties		Ref
Permanent	Provisional	Named after	Date	Site	Discoverer(s)	Category	Diam.	Ref
534201	2014 ST_{134}	—	January 18, 2008	Mount Lemmon	Mount Lemmon Survey	NYS	850 m	MPC · JPL
534202	2014 SU_{134}	—	February 1, 2008	Mount Lemmon	Mount Lemmon Survey	·	1 km	MPC · JPL
534203	2014 SM_{136}	—	October 22, 2003	Kitt Peak	Spacewatch	MAS	520 m	MPC · JPL
534204	2014 SV_{145}	—	March 23, 2006	Catalina	CSS	(2076)	860 m	MPC · JPL
534205	2014 SB_{149}	—	October 9, 2007	Mount Lemmon	Mount Lemmon Survey	·	800 m	MPC · JPL
534206	2014 SV_{150}	—	January 2, 2012	Kitt Peak	Spacewatch	·	510 m	MPC · JPL
534207	2014 SF_{151}	—	July 29, 2010	WISE	WISE	·	1.9 km	MPC · JPL
534208	2014 SU_{153}	—	September 24, 2007	Kitt Peak	Spacewatch	·	920 m	MPC · JPL
534209	2014 SO_{154}	—	May 4, 2006	Mount Lemmon	Mount Lemmon Survey	·	1.4 km	MPC · JPL
534210	2014 SM_{156}	—	January 11, 2008	Kitt Peak	Spacewatch	MAS	700 m	MPC · JPL
534211	2014 SY_{156}	—	September 14, 2014	Kitt Peak	Spacewatch	·	730 m	MPC · JPL
534212	2014 SZ_{156}	—	January 14, 2008	Kitt Peak	Spacewatch	NYS	1.1 km	MPC · JPL
534213	2014 SO_{157}	—	September 19, 2014	Haleakala	Pan-STARRS 1	·	900 m	MPC · JPL
534214	2014 SP_{159}	—	August 25, 2014	Haleakala	Pan-STARRS 1	·	930 m	MPC · JPL
534215	2014 SW_{160}	—	August 24, 2007	Kitt Peak	Spacewatch	·	550 m	MPC · JPL
534216	2014 SD_{163}	—	October 23, 2003	Kitt Peak	Spacewatch	·	1.2 km	MPC · JPL
534217	2014 SS_{168}	—	September 25, 2006	Catalina	CSS	·	1.3 km	MPC · JPL
534218	2014 SZ_{170}	—	October 25, 2011	Haleakala	Pan-STARRS 1	·	750 m	MPC · JPL
534219	2014 SL_{178}	—	October 5, 2004	Kitt Peak	Spacewatch	·	490 m	MPC · JPL
534220	2014 SJ_{191}	—	January 18, 2012	Mount Lemmon	Mount Lemmon Survey	·	790 m	MPC · JPL
534221	2014 SO_{191}	—	July 29, 2014	Haleakala	Pan-STARRS 1	NYS	930 m	MPC · JPL
534222	2014 SO_{192}	—	December 30, 2007	Kitt Peak	Spacewatch	·	970 m	MPC · JPL
534223	2014 SC_{196}	—	March 15, 2012	Mount Lemmon	Mount Lemmon Survey	PHO	930 m	MPC · JPL
534224	2014 SJ_{204}	—	March 12, 2013	Kitt Peak	Spacewatch	·	860 m	MPC · JPL
534225	2014 SJ_{207}	—	August 29, 2005	Kitt Peak	Spacewatch	·	1.4 km	MPC · JPL
534226	2014 SK_{207}	—	November 17, 2006	Mount Lemmon	Mount Lemmon Survey	·	900 m	MPC · JPL
534227	2014 SM_{207}	—	February 22, 2012	Kitt Peak	Spacewatch	·	870 m	MPC · JPL
534228	2014 SO_{207}	—	August 31, 2014	Haleakala	Pan-STARRS 1	·	960 m	MPC · JPL
534229	2014 SV_{209}	—	March 9, 1995	Kitt Peak	Spacewatch	·	1.3 km	MPC · JPL
534230	2014 SA_{210}	—	November 25, 2006	Catalina	CSS	·	1.1 km	MPC · JPL
534231	2014 SE_{210}	—	January 26, 2012	Mount Lemmon	Mount Lemmon Survey	·	630 m	MPC · JPL
534232	2014 SM_{210}	—	September 20, 2014	Haleakala	Pan-STARRS 1	·	1.1 km	MPC · JPL
534233	2014 SB_{211}	—	November 8, 2007	Mount Lemmon	Mount Lemmon Survey	·	820 m	MPC · JPL
534234	2014 SP_{211}	—	December 14, 2010	Mount Lemmon	Mount Lemmon Survey	·	950 m	MPC · JPL
534235	2014 SY_{211}	—	September 20, 2014	Haleakala	Pan-STARRS 1	·	930 m	MPC · JPL
534236	2014 SV_{214}	—	January 2, 2001	Socorro	LINEAR	·	730 m	MPC · JPL
534237	2014 SC_{215}	—	September 20, 2014	Haleakala	Pan-STARRS 1	·	1.1 km	MPC · JPL
534238	2014 SK_{215}	—	November 20, 2001	Socorro	LINEAR	·	1.7 km	MPC · JPL
534239	2014 SL_{215}	—	January 19, 2004	Kitt Peak	Spacewatch	·	1.0 km	MPC · JPL
534240	2014 SW_{216}	—	July 1, 2005	Kitt Peak	Spacewatch	·	1.3 km	MPC · JPL
534241	2014 SB_{217}	—	December 6, 2010	Mount Lemmon	Mount Lemmon Survey	·	1.0 km	MPC · JPL
534242	2014 SF_{217}	—	September 20, 2014	Haleakala	Pan-STARRS 1	HNS	1.0 km	MPC · JPL
534243	2014 SQ_{217}	—	December 19, 2003	Kitt Peak	Spacewatch	PHO	810 m	MPC · JPL
534244	2014 SY_{218}	—	December 16, 2010	Mount Lemmon	Mount Lemmon Survey	·	1.2 km	MPC · JPL
534245	2014 SK_{219}	—	April 6, 2013	Mount Lemmon	Mount Lemmon Survey	·	1.2 km	MPC · JPL
534246	2014 SV_{219}	—	December 15, 2010	Mount Lemmon	Mount Lemmon Survey	MAR	950 m	MPC · JPL
534247	2014 SW_{220}	—	August 30, 2014	Haleakala	Pan-STARRS 1	(2076)	710 m	MPC · JPL
534248	2014 SL_{222}	—	October 2, 2006	Mount Lemmon	Mount Lemmon Survey	·	650 m	MPC · JPL
534249	2014 SP_{222}	—	January 11, 2008	Mount Lemmon	Mount Lemmon Survey	·	960 m	MPC · JPL
534250	2014 SZ_{222}	—	September 2, 2014	Haleakala	Pan-STARRS 1	·	1.1 km	MPC · JPL
534251	2014 SW_{223}	—	September 19, 2014	Haleakala	Pan-STARRS 1	centaur	10 km	MPC · JPL
534252	2014 SX_{231}	—	November 19, 2003	Kitt Peak	Spacewatch	NYS	960 m	MPC · JPL
534253	2014 SZ_{233}	—	January 21, 2012	Kitt Peak	Spacewatch	·	1.0 km	MPC · JPL
534254	2014 SC_{234}	—	December 3, 2004	Kitt Peak	Spacewatch	·	580 m	MPC · JPL
534255	2014 SJ_{237}	—	December 12, 2006	Kitt Peak	Spacewatch	·	1.3 km	MPC · JPL
534256	2014 ST_{240}	—	August 13, 2004	Cerro Tololo	Deep Ecliptic Survey	·	710 m	MPC · JPL
534257	2014 SP_{246}	—	January 22, 2012	Haleakala	Pan-STARRS 1	·	1.3 km	MPC · JPL
534258	2014 SQ_{246}	—	August 6, 2014	Haleakala	Pan-STARRS 1	·	900 m	MPC · JPL
534259	2014 ST_{248}	—	October 20, 2003	Kitt Peak	Spacewatch	·	1.1 km	MPC · JPL
534260	2014 SZ_{256}	—	October 31, 2010	Kitt Peak	Spacewatch	·	1.3 km	MPC · JPL
534261	2014 SG_{261}	—	August 25, 2014	Haleakala	Pan-STARRS 1	·	1.2 km	MPC · JPL
534262	2014 SE_{263}	—	August 28, 2006	Catalina	CSS	·	960 m	MPC · JPL
534263	2014 SC_{264}	—	June 10, 2010	Mount Lemmon	Mount Lemmon Survey	·	1.2 km	MPC · JPL
534264	2014 SZ_{266}	—	April 29, 2009	Kitt Peak	Spacewatch	·	1.7 km	MPC · JPL
534265	2014 SR_{278}	—	September 11, 2007	Catalina	CSS	·	850 m	MPC · JPL
534266	2014 SH_{279}	—	June 27, 2014	Haleakala	Pan-STARRS 1	MAS	710 m	MPC · JPL
534267	2014 SN_{279}	—	December 30, 2007	Mount Lemmon	Mount Lemmon Survey	MAS	630 m	MPC · JPL
534268	2014 SS_{279}	—	October 3, 2006	Mount Lemmon	Mount Lemmon Survey	·	690 m	MPC · JPL
534269	2014 SA_{280}	—	December 18, 2007	Mount Lemmon	Mount Lemmon Survey	·	1.2 km	MPC · JPL
534270	2014 SZ_{280}	—	February 16, 2012	Haleakala	Pan-STARRS 1	NYS	1.2 km	MPC · JPL
534271	2014 SP_{281}	—	August 30, 2014	Haleakala	Pan-STARRS 1	EUN	1.3 km	MPC · JPL
534272	2014 SS_{283}	—	October 7, 2010	Mount Lemmon	Mount Lemmon Survey	·	1.6 km	MPC · JPL
534273	2014 SZ_{284}	—	November 10, 1999	Kitt Peak	Spacewatch	MAS	690 m	MPC · JPL
534274	2014 SB_{285}	—	August 31, 2014	Kitt Peak	Spacewatch	·	830 m	MPC · JPL
534275	2014 SO_{285}	—	March 2, 2005	Kitt Peak	Spacewatch	·	900 m	MPC · JPL
534276	2014 SR_{285}	—	December 10, 2004	Socorro	LINEAR	·	580 m	MPC · JPL
534277	2014 SK_{286}	—	June 3, 2014	Haleakala	Pan-STARRS 1	·	1.2 km	MPC · JPL
534278	2014 SJ_{287}	—	September 5, 2010	Mount Lemmon	Mount Lemmon Survey	·	1.1 km	MPC · JPL
534279	2014 SP_{288}	—	October 1, 2010	La Sagra	OAM	EUN	1.3 km	MPC · JPL
534280	2014 SO_{290}	—	December 22, 2008	Kitt Peak	Spacewatch	·	1.2 km	MPC · JPL
534281	2014 SF_{293}	—	June 17, 2010	Mount Lemmon	Mount Lemmon Survey	·	1.4 km	MPC · JPL
534282	2014 SP_{294}	—	September 10, 2010	Mount Lemmon	Mount Lemmon Survey	·	1.8 km	MPC · JPL
534283	2014 SC_{297}	—	January 17, 2007	Kitt Peak	Spacewatch	·	1.0 km	MPC · JPL
534284	2014 SJ_{298}	—	September 25, 2014	Kitt Peak	Spacewatch	·	1.4 km	MPC · JPL
534285	2014 SP_{299}	—	December 13, 2006	Kitt Peak	Spacewatch	(5)	820 m	MPC · JPL
534286	2014 ST_{299}	—	February 25, 2012	Kitt Peak	Spacewatch	·	1.0 km	MPC · JPL
534287	2014 SY_{299}	—	August 12, 2010	Kitt Peak	Spacewatch	EUN	930 m	MPC · JPL
534288	2014 SE_{300}	—	September 25, 2014	Kitt Peak	Spacewatch	EUN	940 m	MPC · JPL
534289	2014 SS_{307}	—	November 14, 2010	Mount Lemmon	Mount Lemmon Survey	·	1.0 km	MPC · JPL
534290	2014 SW_{307}	—	September 24, 2014	Mount Lemmon	Mount Lemmon Survey	·	880 m	MPC · JPL
534291	2014 SK_{308}	—	October 4, 2006	Mount Lemmon	Mount Lemmon Survey	·	570 m	MPC · JPL
534292	2014 SQ_{308}	—	May 12, 2013	Haleakala	Pan-STARRS 1	·	1.3 km	MPC · JPL
534293	2014 SY_{308}	—	April 8, 2013	Mount Lemmon	Mount Lemmon Survey	·	710 m	MPC · JPL
534294	2014 ST_{309}	—	September 24, 2014	Mount Lemmon	Mount Lemmon Survey	·	1.5 km	MPC · JPL
534295	2014 SW_{309}	—	July 18, 2006	Siding Spring	SSS	·	1.5 km	MPC · JPL
534296	2014 SB_{310}	—	December 14, 2010	Mount Lemmon	Mount Lemmon Survey	(5)	1.2 km	MPC · JPL
534297	2014 SD_{310}	—	March 25, 2006	Kitt Peak	Spacewatch	·	1.2 km	MPC · JPL
534298	2014 SE_{310}	—	October 13, 2010	Kitt Peak	Spacewatch	·	750 m	MPC · JPL
534299 Parazynski	2014 SP_{311}	Parazynski	May 7, 2006	Kitt Peak	Spacewatch	·	1.4 km	MPC · JPL
534300	2014 SL_{312}	—	September 21, 2003	Kitt Peak	Spacewatch	·	2.9 km	MPC · JPL

== 534301–534400 ==
back to top

Designation			Discovery			Properties		Ref
Permanent	Provisional	Named after	Date	Site	Discoverer(s)	Category	Diam.	Ref
534301	2014 SE_{319}	—	September 30, 2003	Kitt Peak	Spacewatch	·	870 m	MPC · JPL
534302	2014 SN_{319}	—	August 29, 2006	Kitt Peak	Spacewatch	·	920 m	MPC · JPL
534303	2014 SJ_{324}	—	October 13, 2010	Mount Lemmon	Mount Lemmon Survey	·	1.1 km	MPC · JPL
534304	2014 SD_{330}	—	September 17, 2010	Mount Lemmon	Mount Lemmon Survey	·	900 m	MPC · JPL
534305	2014 SQ_{332}	—	September 28, 2006	Mount Lemmon	Mount Lemmon Survey	·	820 m	MPC · JPL
534306	2014 SZ_{335}	—	October 17, 2010	Mount Lemmon	Mount Lemmon Survey	(5)	1.0 km	MPC · JPL
534307	2014 SE_{336}	—	September 2, 2014	Haleakala	Pan-STARRS 1	·	1.0 km	MPC · JPL
534308	2014 SO_{337}	—	December 30, 2007	Kitt Peak	Spacewatch	·	1.1 km	MPC · JPL
534309	2014 SS_{337}	—	March 31, 2004	Kitt Peak	Spacewatch	·	1.6 km	MPC · JPL
534310	2014 SZ_{338}	—	October 20, 2006	Kitt Peak	Spacewatch	·	1 km	MPC · JPL
534311	2014 SC_{345}	—	October 19, 2006	Mount Lemmon	Mount Lemmon Survey	·	970 m	MPC · JPL
534312	2014 SN_{346}	—	February 1, 2009	Mount Lemmon	Mount Lemmon Survey	PHO	860 m	MPC · JPL
534313	2014 SY_{347}	—	September 3, 2010	Mount Lemmon	Mount Lemmon Survey	NYS	920 m	MPC · JPL
534314	2014 SJ_{349}	—	September 23, 2014	Haleakala	Pan-STARRS 1	res · 3:5	137 km	MPC · JPL
534315	2014 SK_{349}	—	September 19, 2014	Haleakala	Pan-STARRS 1	plutino	130 km	MPC · JPL
534316	2014 SH_{353}	—	January 16, 2005	Kitt Peak	Spacewatch	·	830 m	MPC · JPL
534317	2014 SV_{353}	—	November 17, 2006	Mount Lemmon	Mount Lemmon Survey	·	1.4 km	MPC · JPL
534318	2014 SB_{354}	—	January 10, 2007	Mount Lemmon	Mount Lemmon Survey	·	1.3 km	MPC · JPL
534319	2014 SM_{354}	—	March 28, 2012	Haleakala	Pan-STARRS 1	·	1.6 km	MPC · JPL
534320	2014 SN_{354}	—	February 9, 2008	Mount Lemmon	Mount Lemmon Survey	·	1.6 km	MPC · JPL
534321	2014 SO_{354}	—	October 17, 2010	Mount Lemmon	Mount Lemmon Survey	·	950 m	MPC · JPL
534322	2014 SP_{354}	—	April 7, 2013	Mount Lemmon	Mount Lemmon Survey	·	980 m	MPC · JPL
534323	2014 SQ_{354}	—	February 27, 2012	Haleakala	Pan-STARRS 1	·	1.3 km	MPC · JPL
534324	2014 SR_{354}	—	November 7, 2010	Mount Lemmon	Mount Lemmon Survey	·	1.7 km	MPC · JPL
534325	2014 SA_{357}	—	September 3, 2010	Mount Lemmon	Mount Lemmon Survey	·	1.2 km	MPC · JPL
534326	2014 SL_{357}	—	September 18, 2014	Haleakala	Pan-STARRS 1	EUN	940 m	MPC · JPL
534327	2014 SY_{360}	—	September 20, 2014	Haleakala	Pan-STARRS 1	EUN	920 m	MPC · JPL
534328	2014 SA_{361}	—	November 10, 2010	Mount Lemmon	Mount Lemmon Survey	(5)	1.2 km	MPC · JPL
534329	2014 SD_{361}	—	September 20, 2014	Haleakala	Pan-STARRS 1	·	1.2 km	MPC · JPL
534330	2014 SF_{361}	—	June 30, 2013	Haleakala	Pan-STARRS 1	·	1.2 km	MPC · JPL
534331	2014 SO_{361}	—	September 24, 2005	Kitt Peak	Spacewatch	EUN	820 m	MPC · JPL
534332	2014 SQ_{361}	—	March 28, 2012	Haleakala	Pan-STARRS 1	HNS	1.2 km	MPC · JPL
534333	2014 SU_{361}	—	September 28, 2006	Mount Lemmon	Mount Lemmon Survey	·	760 m	MPC · JPL
534334	2014 ST_{362}	—	November 5, 2010	Mount Lemmon	Mount Lemmon Survey	·	880 m	MPC · JPL
534335	2014 SB_{363}	—	February 25, 2012	Kitt Peak	Spacewatch	·	1.2 km	MPC · JPL
534336	2014 TC_{4}	—	October 29, 2010	Mount Lemmon	Mount Lemmon Survey	ADE	1.7 km	MPC · JPL
534337	2014 TM_{4}	—	August 28, 2014	Haleakala	Pan-STARRS 1	·	650 m	MPC · JPL
534338	2014 TW_{4}	—	April 16, 2013	Haleakala	Pan-STARRS 1	·	1.1 km	MPC · JPL
534339	2014 TK_{6}	—	October 1, 2014	Kitt Peak	Spacewatch	EUN	860 m	MPC · JPL
534340	2014 TB_{8}	—	November 25, 2006	Mount Lemmon	Mount Lemmon Survey	(5)	1.2 km	MPC · JPL
534341	2014 TF_{8}	—	September 2, 2014	Haleakala	Pan-STARRS 1	EUN	950 m	MPC · JPL
534342	2014 TU_{8}	—	July 28, 2014	Haleakala	Pan-STARRS 1	(5)	1.4 km	MPC · JPL
534343	2014 TN_{11}	—	November 13, 2006	Kitt Peak	Spacewatch	(5)	1.1 km	MPC · JPL
534344	2014 TF_{18}	—	January 17, 2007	Kitt Peak	Spacewatch	·	1.4 km	MPC · JPL
534345	2014 TH_{18}	—	October 4, 2014	Haleakala	Pan-STARRS 1	·	3.5 km	MPC · JPL
534346	2014 TR_{21}	—	September 2, 2014	Haleakala	Pan-STARRS 1	·	1.2 km	MPC · JPL
534347	2014 TF_{22}	—	November 19, 2007	Mount Lemmon	Mount Lemmon Survey	·	580 m	MPC · JPL
534348	2014 TG_{27}	—	September 11, 2010	Mount Lemmon	Mount Lemmon Survey	·	970 m	MPC · JPL
534349	2014 TQ_{27}	—	September 16, 2003	Kitt Peak	Spacewatch	NYS	850 m	MPC · JPL
534350	2014 TZ_{27}	—	September 19, 2006	Kitt Peak	Spacewatch	·	1.1 km	MPC · JPL
534351	2014 TQ_{28}	—	November 26, 2003	Kitt Peak	Spacewatch	·	890 m	MPC · JPL
534352	2014 TC_{30}	—	September 2, 2014	Haleakala	Pan-STARRS 1	·	870 m	MPC · JPL
534353	2014 TQ_{30}	—	October 2, 2014	Haleakala	Pan-STARRS 1	·	1.1 km	MPC · JPL
534354	2014 TD_{31}	—	December 27, 2011	Kitt Peak	Spacewatch	·	500 m	MPC · JPL
534355	2014 TK_{35}	—	October 1, 2014	Catalina	CSS	·	1.6 km	MPC · JPL
534356	2014 TS_{36}	—	August 31, 2014	Haleakala	Pan-STARRS 1	·	1.2 km	MPC · JPL
534357	2014 TS_{38}	—	May 8, 2013	Haleakala	Pan-STARRS 1	·	1.1 km	MPC · JPL
534358	2014 TM_{39}	—	November 10, 2004	Kitt Peak	Spacewatch	·	780 m	MPC · JPL
534359	2014 TY_{39}	—	December 25, 2010	Mount Lemmon	Mount Lemmon Survey	·	1.6 km	MPC · JPL
534360	2014 TZ_{39}	—	March 15, 2012	Mount Lemmon	Mount Lemmon Survey	·	1.1 km	MPC · JPL
534361	2014 TM_{40}	—	September 22, 2003	Kitt Peak	Spacewatch	·	970 m	MPC · JPL
534362	2014 TS_{43}	—	April 13, 1996	Kitt Peak	Spacewatch	·	1.1 km	MPC · JPL
534363	2014 TZ_{44}	—	October 2, 2014	Kitt Peak	Spacewatch	·	1.1 km	MPC · JPL
534364	2014 TV_{45}	—	September 24, 2014	Kitt Peak	Spacewatch	·	1.2 km	MPC · JPL
534365	2014 TU_{46}	—	March 6, 2008	Mount Lemmon	Mount Lemmon Survey	MAR	830 m	MPC · JPL
534366	2014 TY_{46}	—	March 29, 2012	Kitt Peak	Spacewatch	HNS	1.1 km	MPC · JPL
534367	2014 TA_{47}	—	December 4, 2007	Mount Lemmon	Mount Lemmon Survey	MAS	500 m	MPC · JPL
534368	2014 TB_{47}	—	August 30, 2005	Campo Imperatore	CINEOS	·	2.0 km	MPC · JPL
534369	2014 TH_{47}	—	May 23, 2006	Mount Lemmon	Mount Lemmon Survey	·	990 m	MPC · JPL
534370	2014 TA_{48}	—	March 24, 2012	Mount Lemmon	Mount Lemmon Survey	·	770 m	MPC · JPL
534371	2014 TJ_{48}	—	February 17, 2007	Kitt Peak	Spacewatch	·	2.0 km	MPC · JPL
534372	2014 TD_{49}	—	February 14, 1999	Kitt Peak	Spacewatch	·	1.5 km	MPC · JPL
534373	2014 TE_{49}	—	October 5, 2014	Haleakala	Pan-STARRS 1	L5	10 km	MPC · JPL
534374	2014 TJ_{52}	—	August 31, 2014	Catalina	CSS	·	1.3 km	MPC · JPL
534375	2014 TR_{53}	—	October 14, 2014	Kitt Peak	Spacewatch	·	1.0 km	MPC · JPL
534376	2014 TV_{53}	—	April 29, 2008	Mount Lemmon	Mount Lemmon Survey	(5)	1.1 km	MPC · JPL
534377	2014 TK_{54}	—	September 4, 2010	Mount Lemmon	Mount Lemmon Survey	·	950 m	MPC · JPL
534378	2014 TB_{55}	—	October 13, 2010	Mount Lemmon	Mount Lemmon Survey	·	600 m	MPC · JPL
534379	2014 TC_{55}	—	October 23, 2006	Mount Lemmon	Mount Lemmon Survey	·	1.1 km	MPC · JPL
534380	2014 TV_{58}	—	October 19, 2006	Mount Lemmon	Mount Lemmon Survey	·	850 m	MPC · JPL
534381	2014 TG_{59}	—	August 29, 2014	Mount Lemmon	Mount Lemmon Survey	·	1.1 km	MPC · JPL
534382	2014 TM_{59}	—	September 29, 1997	Kitt Peak	Spacewatch	·	1.3 km	MPC · JPL
534383	2014 TS_{59}	—	October 2, 1997	Caussols	ODAS	·	1.2 km	MPC · JPL
534384	2014 TX_{60}	—	April 22, 2010	WISE	WISE	·	1.9 km	MPC · JPL
534385	2014 TT_{61}	—	October 13, 2010	Mount Lemmon	Mount Lemmon Survey	KON	2.0 km	MPC · JPL
534386	2014 TO_{62}	—	August 31, 2014	Haleakala	Pan-STARRS 1	·	1.5 km	MPC · JPL
534387	2014 TL_{63}	—	November 27, 2010	Catalina	CSS	·	1.6 km	MPC · JPL
534388	2014 TA_{64}	—	November 3, 2007	Kitt Peak	Spacewatch	MAS	580 m	MPC · JPL
534389	2014 TA_{65}	—	August 6, 2014	Haleakala	Pan-STARRS 1	·	700 m	MPC · JPL
534390 Huningsheng	2014 TR_{65}	Huningsheng	September 1, 1995	La Silla	C.-I. Lagerkvist	·	1.3 km	MPC · JPL
534391	2014 TF_{66}	—	March 20, 2007	Catalina	CSS	·	1.6 km	MPC · JPL
534392	2014 TU_{68}	—	December 29, 2011	Mount Lemmon	Mount Lemmon Survey	·	700 m	MPC · JPL
534393	2014 TA_{69}	—	October 14, 2010	Mount Lemmon	Mount Lemmon Survey	·	910 m	MPC · JPL
534394	2014 TH_{69}	—	December 18, 2001	Kitt Peak	Spacewatch	·	1.6 km	MPC · JPL
534395	2014 TJ_{69}	—	December 15, 2007	Kitt Peak	Spacewatch	·	810 m	MPC · JPL
534396	2014 TD_{70}	—	October 14, 2001	Kitt Peak	Spacewatch	JUN	730 m	MPC · JPL
534397	2014 TE_{71}	—	November 11, 2007	Mount Lemmon	Mount Lemmon Survey	NYS	920 m	MPC · JPL
534398	2014 TH_{71}	—	October 10, 2010	Mount Lemmon	Mount Lemmon Survey	·	1.0 km	MPC · JPL
534399	2014 TN_{73}	—	January 11, 2008	Kitt Peak	Spacewatch	NYS	820 m	MPC · JPL
534400	2014 TL_{75}	—	July 1, 2010	WISE	WISE	·	1.7 km	MPC · JPL

== 534401–534500 ==
back to top

Designation			Discovery			Properties		Ref
Permanent	Provisional	Named after	Date	Site	Discoverer(s)	Category	Diam.	Ref
534401	2014 TE_{82}	—	October 23, 2003	Kitt Peak	Spacewatch	MAS	710 m	MPC · JPL
534402	2014 TJ_{83}	—	September 2, 2014	Haleakala	Pan-STARRS 1	·	1.0 km	MPC · JPL
534403	2014 TZ_{83}	—	September 18, 2006	Catalina	CSS	·	790 m	MPC · JPL
534404	2014 TF_{84}	—	May 15, 2013	Haleakala	Pan-STARRS 1	·	1.1 km	MPC · JPL
534405	2014 TW_{85}	—	October 2, 2014	Haleakala	Pan-STARRS 1	cubewano (cold)	209 km	MPC · JPL
534406	2014 TU_{86}	—	October 1, 2014	Kitt Peak	Spacewatch	EUN	1.5 km	MPC · JPL
534407	2014 TD_{88}	—	February 10, 2008	Kitt Peak	Spacewatch	·	1.4 km	MPC · JPL
534408	2014 TE_{88}	—	August 10, 2010	Kitt Peak	Spacewatch	MAR	1.2 km	MPC · JPL
534409	2014 TF_{88}	—	October 30, 2010	Mount Lemmon	Mount Lemmon Survey	·	1.5 km	MPC · JPL
534410	2014 TG_{88}	—	November 16, 2006	Mount Lemmon	Mount Lemmon Survey	(194)	1.4 km	MPC · JPL
534411	2014 TL_{88}	—	October 2, 2014	Haleakala	Pan-STARRS 1	·	730 m	MPC · JPL
534412	2014 TN_{88}	—	October 20, 2007	Kitt Peak	Spacewatch	·	760 m	MPC · JPL
534413	2014 TQ_{88}	—	August 5, 2010	WISE	WISE	·	1.5 km	MPC · JPL
534414	2014 TR_{88}	—	September 16, 2010	Mount Lemmon	Mount Lemmon Survey	·	1.2 km	MPC · JPL
534415	2014 TS_{88}	—	October 30, 2010	Mount Lemmon	Mount Lemmon Survey	·	1.0 km	MPC · JPL
534416	2014 TU_{88}	—	October 2, 2014	Haleakala	Pan-STARRS 1	MAR	870 m	MPC · JPL
534417	2014 TL_{89}	—	January 18, 2009	Mount Lemmon	Mount Lemmon Survey	·	520 m	MPC · JPL
534418	2014 TR_{89}	—	October 3, 2014	Mount Lemmon	Mount Lemmon Survey	·	630 m	MPC · JPL
534419	2014 TH_{90}	—	October 4, 2014	Haleakala	Pan-STARRS 1	·	1.8 km	MPC · JPL
534420	2014 TA_{91}	—	December 22, 2003	Kitt Peak	Spacewatch	·	970 m	MPC · JPL
534421	2014 TY_{91}	—	September 18, 2010	Mount Lemmon	Mount Lemmon Survey	·	1.2 km	MPC · JPL
534422	2014 TC_{92}	—	April 15, 2013	Haleakala	Pan-STARRS 1	EUN	880 m	MPC · JPL
534423	2014 TE_{92}	—	November 11, 2010	Mount Lemmon	Mount Lemmon Survey	(5)	840 m	MPC · JPL
534424	2014 TO_{92}	—	December 30, 2007	Kitt Peak	Spacewatch	·	950 m	MPC · JPL
534425	2014 TB_{93}	—	April 27, 2012	Haleakala	Pan-STARRS 1	·	1.2 km	MPC · JPL
534426	2014 TN_{93}	—	October 3, 2014	Mount Lemmon	Mount Lemmon Survey	RAF	740 m	MPC · JPL
534427	2014 TP_{93}	—	January 20, 2012	Haleakala	Pan-STARRS 1	·	2.4 km	MPC · JPL
534428	2014 TT_{93}	—	October 9, 2010	Mount Lemmon	Mount Lemmon Survey	EUN	920 m	MPC · JPL
534429	2014 TX_{93}	—	October 29, 2010	Kitt Peak	Spacewatch	·	990 m	MPC · JPL
534430	2014 TH_{94}	—	August 28, 2009	Kitt Peak	Spacewatch	·	1.3 km	MPC · JPL
534431	2014 TJ_{95}	—	October 4, 2014	Mount Lemmon	Mount Lemmon Survey	PHO	1.2 km	MPC · JPL
534432	2014 UY_{1}	—	October 16, 2014	Kitt Peak	Spacewatch	critical	1.2 km	MPC · JPL
534433	2014 US_{2}	—	February 19, 2012	Kitt Peak	Spacewatch	·	1.4 km	MPC · JPL
534434	2014 UV_{3}	—	April 16, 2012	Haleakala	Pan-STARRS 1	·	1.2 km	MPC · JPL
534435	2014 UY_{3}	—	November 14, 2010	Mount Lemmon	Mount Lemmon Survey	(5)	830 m	MPC · JPL
534436	2014 UF_{4}	—	February 28, 2012	Haleakala	Pan-STARRS 1	·	820 m	MPC · JPL
534437	2014 UN_{4}	—	November 6, 2010	Kitt Peak	Spacewatch	·	1.1 km	MPC · JPL
534438	2014 UC_{5}	—	November 1, 2005	Mount Lemmon	Mount Lemmon Survey	·	2.1 km	MPC · JPL
534439	2014 US_{5}	—	December 16, 2007	Mount Lemmon	Mount Lemmon Survey	·	1.1 km	MPC · JPL
534440	2014 UR_{6}	—	October 5, 2014	Mount Lemmon	Mount Lemmon Survey	·	1.3 km	MPC · JPL
534441	2014 UH_{8}	—	August 31, 2014	Haleakala	Pan-STARRS 1	BAR	880 m	MPC · JPL
534442	2014 UA_{9}	—	December 9, 2010	Mount Lemmon	Mount Lemmon Survey	·	1.8 km	MPC · JPL
534443	2014 UK_{9}	—	April 12, 2013	Haleakala	Pan-STARRS 1	·	1 km	MPC · JPL
534444	2014 UM_{9}	—	June 19, 2012	Mount Lemmon	Mount Lemmon Survey	·	2.3 km	MPC · JPL
534445	2014 UX_{9}	—	November 25, 2006	Kitt Peak	Spacewatch	·	1.2 km	MPC · JPL
534446	2014 UE_{10}	—	October 3, 2014	Mount Lemmon	Mount Lemmon Survey	·	1.6 km	MPC · JPL
534447	2014 UU_{10}	—	December 6, 2010	Mount Lemmon	Mount Lemmon Survey	(5)	1.4 km	MPC · JPL
534448	2014 UV_{10}	—	November 6, 2010	Kitt Peak	Spacewatch	(194)	770 m	MPC · JPL
534449	2014 UW_{13}	—	April 12, 2013	Haleakala	Pan-STARRS 1	JUN	980 m	MPC · JPL
534450	2014 UQ_{14}	—	October 17, 2014	Kitt Peak	Spacewatch	·	530 m	MPC · JPL
534451	2014 UX_{14}	—	March 15, 2013	Mount Lemmon	Mount Lemmon Survey	·	630 m	MPC · JPL
534452	2014 UC_{16}	—	November 1, 2010	Kitt Peak	Spacewatch	EUN	900 m	MPC · JPL
534453	2014 UX_{17}	—	October 1, 1999	Kitt Peak	Spacewatch	·	1.1 km	MPC · JPL
534454	2014 UR_{18}	—	October 20, 2003	Kitt Peak	Spacewatch	MAS	620 m	MPC · JPL
534455	2014 UW_{18}	—	November 22, 2006	Kitt Peak	Spacewatch	·	750 m	MPC · JPL
534456	2014 UL_{19}	—	October 20, 2007	Mount Lemmon	Mount Lemmon Survey	·	850 m	MPC · JPL
534457	2014 UQ_{20}	—	October 18, 2014	Kitt Peak	Spacewatch	·	1.3 km	MPC · JPL
534458	2014 UZ_{20}	—	December 14, 2006	Kitt Peak	Spacewatch	(5)	870 m	MPC · JPL
534459	2014 UJ_{22}	—	November 23, 2009	Mount Lemmon	Mount Lemmon Survey	·	1.7 km	MPC · JPL
534460	2014 UZ_{22}	—	November 6, 2010	Mount Lemmon	Mount Lemmon Survey	·	1.2 km	MPC · JPL
534461	2014 UM_{23}	—	July 29, 2014	Haleakala	Pan-STARRS 1	·	1.3 km	MPC · JPL
534462	2014 UD_{25}	—	December 19, 2003	Kitt Peak	Spacewatch	NYS	1.1 km	MPC · JPL
534463	2014 UP_{25}	—	July 29, 2010	WISE	WISE	KON	1.4 km	MPC · JPL
534464	2014 UO_{27}	—	October 20, 2014	Kitt Peak	Spacewatch	·	1.4 km	MPC · JPL
534465	2014 US_{27}	—	October 1, 2014	Haleakala	Pan-STARRS 1	·	1.3 km	MPC · JPL
534466	2014 UV_{27}	—	September 4, 2014	Haleakala	Pan-STARRS 1	(5)	1.1 km	MPC · JPL
534467	2014 UW_{27}	—	April 14, 2007	Kitt Peak	Spacewatch	·	2.0 km	MPC · JPL
534468	2014 UZ_{27}	—	November 13, 2006	Kitt Peak	Spacewatch	·	1.3 km	MPC · JPL
534469	2014 UO_{28}	—	July 15, 2013	Haleakala	Pan-STARRS 1	·	2.0 km	MPC · JPL
534470	2014 UW_{28}	—	October 27, 2005	Kitt Peak	Spacewatch	·	1.8 km	MPC · JPL
534471	2014 UX_{28}	—	October 20, 2014	Kitt Peak	Spacewatch	·	1.5 km	MPC · JPL
534472	2014 UE_{30}	—	October 3, 2014	Mount Lemmon	Mount Lemmon Survey	·	1.8 km	MPC · JPL
534473	2014 UK_{32}	—	April 14, 2008	Mount Lemmon	Mount Lemmon Survey	·	1.1 km	MPC · JPL
534474	2014 US_{32}	—	April 2, 2009	Mount Lemmon	Mount Lemmon Survey	·	610 m	MPC · JPL
534475	2014 UU_{32}	—	November 3, 2010	Kitt Peak	Spacewatch	·	1.3 km	MPC · JPL
534476	2014 UY_{33}	—	December 30, 2000	Socorro	LINEAR	PHO	1.3 km	MPC · JPL
534477	2014 UP_{38}	—	October 24, 2011	Mount Lemmon	Mount Lemmon Survey	·	560 m	MPC · JPL
534478	2014 UL_{41}	—	September 4, 2010	Kitt Peak	Spacewatch	·	1.1 km	MPC · JPL
534479	2014 UN_{41}	—	September 19, 2003	Kitt Peak	Spacewatch	·	770 m	MPC · JPL
534480	2014 UE_{42}	—	November 20, 2009	Mount Lemmon	Mount Lemmon Survey	EOS	2.3 km	MPC · JPL
534481	2014 UJ_{42}	—	January 26, 2012	Haleakala	Pan-STARRS 1	MAS	810 m	MPC · JPL
534482	2014 UQ_{45}	—	September 11, 2010	Catalina	CSS	·	1.1 km	MPC · JPL
534483	2014 UY_{45}	—	August 16, 2006	Siding Spring	SSS	·	1.1 km	MPC · JPL
534484	2014 UC_{46}	—	October 15, 2001	Kitt Peak	Spacewatch	·	1.5 km	MPC · JPL
534485	2014 UD_{46}	—	October 23, 2001	Kitt Peak	Spacewatch	·	1.2 km	MPC · JPL
534486	2014 UF_{46}	—	November 18, 2006	Kitt Peak	Spacewatch	·	690 m	MPC · JPL
534487	2014 UH_{47}	—	September 25, 2005	Kitt Peak	Spacewatch	·	1.7 km	MPC · JPL
534488	2014 UO_{49}	—	October 21, 2014	Kitt Peak	Spacewatch	EUN	1.3 km	MPC · JPL
534489	2014 US_{49}	—	September 17, 2010	Mount Lemmon	Mount Lemmon Survey	NYS	780 m	MPC · JPL
534490	2014 UX_{49}	—	October 21, 2014	Kitt Peak	Spacewatch	·	1.2 km	MPC · JPL
534491	2014 UY_{49}	—	October 21, 2014	Kitt Peak	Spacewatch	·	1.3 km	MPC · JPL
534492	2014 UG_{50}	—	October 29, 2005	Catalina	CSS	·	2.9 km	MPC · JPL
534493	2014 UM_{50}	—	October 17, 2001	Socorro	LINEAR	·	1.5 km	MPC · JPL
534494	2014 UE_{52}	—	October 1, 2000	Kitt Peak	Spacewatch	(2076)	720 m	MPC · JPL
534495	2014 UE_{53}	—	May 30, 2013	Mount Lemmon	Mount Lemmon Survey	·	1.1 km	MPC · JPL
534496	2014 UO_{53}	—	September 12, 2007	Catalina	CSS	·	600 m	MPC · JPL
534497	2014 UY_{53}	—	September 30, 2005	Mount Lemmon	Mount Lemmon Survey	·	2.1 km	MPC · JPL
534498	2014 UG_{54}	—	November 7, 2010	Kitt Peak	Spacewatch	EUN	900 m	MPC · JPL
534499	2014 UJ_{54}	—	November 11, 2006	Kitt Peak	Spacewatch	·	760 m	MPC · JPL
534500	2014 UU_{57}	—	October 24, 2014	Catalina	CSS	·	1.6 km	MPC · JPL

== 534501–534600 ==
back to top

Designation			Discovery			Properties		Ref
Permanent	Provisional	Named after	Date	Site	Discoverer(s)	Category	Diam.	Ref
534501	2014 UU_{58}	—	August 12, 2010	Kitt Peak	Spacewatch	MAS	640 m	MPC · JPL
534502	2014 UC_{60}	—	October 18, 2014	Mount Lemmon	Mount Lemmon Survey	PHO	1.0 km	MPC · JPL
534503	2014 UY_{61}	—	August 29, 2005	Kitt Peak	Spacewatch	·	1.2 km	MPC · JPL
534504	2014 US_{64}	—	September 19, 2003	Kitt Peak	Spacewatch	·	860 m	MPC · JPL
534505	2014 UK_{66}	—	March 16, 2012	Kitt Peak	Spacewatch	·	1.4 km	MPC · JPL
534506	2014 UU_{66}	—	October 10, 2005	Catalina	CSS	HNS	1.4 km	MPC · JPL
534507	2014 UY_{67}	—	November 19, 2003	Kitt Peak	Spacewatch	V	720 m	MPC · JPL
534508	2014 UB_{69}	—	September 11, 2010	Kitt Peak	Spacewatch	MAS	560 m	MPC · JPL
534509	2014 UK_{77}	—	September 18, 2003	Kitt Peak	Spacewatch	·	710 m	MPC · JPL
534510	2014 UR_{80}	—	September 29, 2003	Kitt Peak	Spacewatch	MAS	510 m	MPC · JPL
534511	2014 UY_{82}	—	December 27, 2006	Mount Lemmon	Mount Lemmon Survey	·	970 m	MPC · JPL
534512	2014 UK_{85}	—	September 28, 2003	Kitt Peak	Spacewatch	V	520 m	MPC · JPL
534513	2014 UH_{86}	—	October 21, 2014	Mount Lemmon	Mount Lemmon Survey	NYS	710 m	MPC · JPL
534514	2014 UG_{88}	—	April 22, 2009	Mount Lemmon	Mount Lemmon Survey	·	1.2 km	MPC · JPL
534515	2014 UK_{88}	—	September 24, 2014	Mount Lemmon	Mount Lemmon Survey	·	1.1 km	MPC · JPL
534516	2014 UT_{88}	—	May 8, 2013	Haleakala	Pan-STARRS 1	(5)	1.0 km	MPC · JPL
534517	2014 UX_{88}	—	September 11, 2010	Mount Lemmon	Mount Lemmon Survey	EUN	890 m	MPC · JPL
534518	2014 UK_{90}	—	October 10, 2010	Mount Lemmon	Mount Lemmon Survey	·	1.2 km	MPC · JPL
534519	2014 UK_{92}	—	December 21, 2006	Mount Lemmon	Mount Lemmon Survey	·	1.1 km	MPC · JPL
534520	2014 UF_{93}	—	September 2, 2014	Mount Lemmon	Mount Lemmon Survey	·	1.1 km	MPC · JPL
534521	2014 UA_{94}	—	October 22, 2014	Mount Lemmon	Mount Lemmon Survey	MAR	970 m	MPC · JPL
534522	2014 UV_{94}	—	September 30, 2006	Mount Lemmon	Mount Lemmon Survey	3:2	5.1 km	MPC · JPL
534523	2014 UL_{95}	—	December 20, 2007	Kitt Peak	Spacewatch	·	1.2 km	MPC · JPL
534524	2014 UP_{95}	—	October 23, 2014	Kitt Peak	Spacewatch	·	860 m	MPC · JPL
534525	2014 UE_{96}	—	January 2, 2012	Kitt Peak	Spacewatch	·	540 m	MPC · JPL
534526	2014 UL_{97}	—	August 31, 2014	Haleakala	Pan-STARRS 1	·	880 m	MPC · JPL
534527	2014 UT_{97}	—	December 2, 2010	Mount Lemmon	Mount Lemmon Survey	·	1.1 km	MPC · JPL
534528	2014 UQ_{98}	—	February 27, 2008	Kitt Peak	Spacewatch	·	1.2 km	MPC · JPL
534529	2014 UW_{98}	—	October 1, 2005	Mount Lemmon	Mount Lemmon Survey	·	1.6 km	MPC · JPL
534530	2014 UP_{99}	—	September 30, 2006	Mount Lemmon	Mount Lemmon Survey	·	970 m	MPC · JPL
534531	2014 UQ_{100}	—	November 3, 2010	Mount Lemmon	Mount Lemmon Survey	·	680 m	MPC · JPL
534532	2014 UP_{101}	—	October 3, 2006	Mount Lemmon	Mount Lemmon Survey	·	1.6 km	MPC · JPL
534533	2014 UO_{102}	—	September 22, 2003	Kitt Peak	Spacewatch	·	1.3 km	MPC · JPL
534534	2014 US_{103}	—	August 12, 2010	Kitt Peak	Spacewatch	·	1.4 km	MPC · JPL
534535	2014 UV_{103}	—	September 10, 2007	Kitt Peak	Spacewatch	·	540 m	MPC · JPL
534536	2014 UB_{105}	—	November 18, 2003	Kitt Peak	Spacewatch	MAS	590 m	MPC · JPL
534537	2014 UL_{105}	—	October 24, 2014	Kitt Peak	Spacewatch	·	1.1 km	MPC · JPL
534538	2014 UP_{105}	—	September 2, 2014	Mount Lemmon	Mount Lemmon Survey	·	1.7 km	MPC · JPL
534539	2014 UD_{110}	—	September 1, 2014	Mount Lemmon	Mount Lemmon Survey	·	1.0 km	MPC · JPL
534540	2014 UV_{111}	—	October 30, 2010	Kitt Peak	Spacewatch	·	1.0 km	MPC · JPL
534541	2014 UE_{112}	—	August 30, 2014	Haleakala	Pan-STARRS 1	·	1.2 km	MPC · JPL
534542	2014 UQ_{112}	—	February 26, 2009	Mount Lemmon	Mount Lemmon Survey	·	1.2 km	MPC · JPL
534543	2014 UJ_{113}	—	June 7, 2013	Haleakala	Pan-STARRS 1	·	760 m	MPC · JPL
534544	2014 UP_{113}	—	November 14, 2010	Kitt Peak	Spacewatch	(5)	870 m	MPC · JPL
534545	2014 UV_{113}	—	September 4, 2014	Haleakala	Pan-STARRS 1	·	1.0 km	MPC · JPL
534546	2014 UC_{114}	—	March 26, 2010	WISE	WISE	·	1.1 km	MPC · JPL
534547	2014 UN_{116}	—	January 4, 2011	Catalina	CSS	·	1.4 km	MPC · JPL
534548	2014 UE_{120}	—	October 7, 2014	Haleakala	Pan-STARRS 1	MAR	1.2 km	MPC · JPL
534549	2014 UM_{120}	—	October 2, 1997	Kitt Peak	Spacewatch	·	1.1 km	MPC · JPL
534550	2014 UN_{121}	—	October 3, 2014	Mount Lemmon	Mount Lemmon Survey	(5)	1.0 km	MPC · JPL
534551	2014 UW_{121}	—	October 7, 2010	Mount Lemmon	Mount Lemmon Survey	KON	2.6 km	MPC · JPL
534552	2014 UX_{126}	—	November 4, 2005	Mount Lemmon	Mount Lemmon Survey	PAD	1.7 km	MPC · JPL
534553	2014 UG_{134}	—	December 2, 2010	Catalina	CSS	MAR	1.0 km	MPC · JPL
534554	2014 US_{134}	—	November 17, 2001	Kitt Peak	Spacewatch	·	1.4 km	MPC · JPL
534555	2014 UX_{134}	—	October 30, 2010	Kitt Peak	Spacewatch	·	1.2 km	MPC · JPL
534556	2014 UD_{136}	—	January 16, 2005	Kitt Peak	Spacewatch	·	480 m	MPC · JPL
534557	2014 UH_{136}	—	November 27, 2010	Mount Lemmon	Mount Lemmon Survey	·	1.2 km	MPC · JPL
534558	2014 UO_{142}	—	October 13, 2010	Mount Lemmon	Mount Lemmon Survey	·	1.3 km	MPC · JPL
534559	2014 UM_{143}	—	November 2, 2010	Kitt Peak	Spacewatch	·	1.1 km	MPC · JPL
534560	2014 UL_{146}	—	November 16, 2003	Kitt Peak	Spacewatch	V	730 m	MPC · JPL
534561	2014 UA_{148}	—	November 18, 2003	Palomar	NEAT	·	1.1 km	MPC · JPL
534562	2014 UK_{148}	—	December 13, 2010	Mount Lemmon	Mount Lemmon Survey	(5)	830 m	MPC · JPL
534563	2014 UF_{151}	—	November 10, 2010	Mount Lemmon	Mount Lemmon Survey	·	1.5 km	MPC · JPL
534564	2014 UU_{153}	—	August 25, 2014	Haleakala	Pan-STARRS 1	·	790 m	MPC · JPL
534565	2014 UM_{156}	—	December 11, 2010	Kitt Peak	Spacewatch	·	1.2 km	MPC · JPL
534566	2014 UH_{157}	—	September 17, 2003	Kitt Peak	Spacewatch	MAS	540 m	MPC · JPL
534567	2014 UX_{157}	—	May 3, 2013	Haleakala	Pan-STARRS 1	·	750 m	MPC · JPL
534568	2014 UH_{158}	—	September 21, 2001	Apache Point	SDSS	·	1.3 km	MPC · JPL
534569	2014 UG_{159}	—	September 16, 2003	Kitt Peak	Spacewatch	·	810 m	MPC · JPL
534570	2014 UU_{159}	—	October 7, 2007	Mount Lemmon	Mount Lemmon Survey	PHO	650 m	MPC · JPL
534571	2014 UP_{160}	—	February 23, 2007	Catalina	CSS	·	1.8 km	MPC · JPL
534572	2014 UZ_{160}	—	August 18, 2009	Kitt Peak	Spacewatch	·	1.8 km	MPC · JPL
534573	2014 UL_{162}	—	October 9, 2007	Mount Lemmon	Mount Lemmon Survey	V	530 m	MPC · JPL
534574	2014 UO_{163}	—	October 22, 2003	Kitt Peak	Spacewatch	MAS	620 m	MPC · JPL
534575	2014 UT_{163}	—	May 8, 2013	Haleakala	Pan-STARRS 1	·	1.2 km	MPC · JPL
534576	2014 UX_{163}	—	November 12, 2010	Kitt Peak	Spacewatch	·	930 m	MPC · JPL
534577	2014 UK_{165}	—	October 30, 2010	Mount Lemmon	Mount Lemmon Survey	·	990 m	MPC · JPL
534578	2014 UW_{167}	—	September 4, 2010	Kitt Peak	Spacewatch	V	470 m	MPC · JPL
534579	2014 UZ_{169}	—	October 26, 2014	Haleakala	Pan-STARRS 1	·	960 m	MPC · JPL
534580	2014 US_{170}	—	August 28, 2014	Haleakala	Pan-STARRS 1	·	1.4 km	MPC · JPL
534581	2014 UD_{171}	—	June 2, 2013	Mount Lemmon	Mount Lemmon Survey	·	1.0 km	MPC · JPL
534582	2014 UN_{172}	—	December 3, 2010	Mount Lemmon	Mount Lemmon Survey	EUN	1.2 km	MPC · JPL
534583	2014 UA_{173}	—	December 6, 2010	Catalina	CSS	BRG	1.5 km	MPC · JPL
534584	2014 UO_{176}	—	November 16, 1999	Kitt Peak	Spacewatch	·	1.2 km	MPC · JPL
534585	2014 UV_{176}	—	October 2, 2003	Kitt Peak	Spacewatch	·	1 km	MPC · JPL
534586	2014 UZ_{176}	—	November 16, 2006	Kitt Peak	Spacewatch	MAR	1.0 km	MPC · JPL
534587	2014 UV_{177}	—	November 5, 2010	Kitt Peak	Spacewatch	·	1.0 km	MPC · JPL
534588	2014 UQ_{180}	—	August 10, 2010	Kitt Peak	Spacewatch	MAR	1.0 km	MPC · JPL
534589	2014 UF_{181}	—	October 9, 2007	Kitt Peak	Spacewatch	·	580 m	MPC · JPL
534590	2014 US_{183}	—	November 26, 2003	Kitt Peak	Spacewatch	NYS	740 m	MPC · JPL
534591	2014 UF_{185}	—	November 1, 2006	Catalina	CSS	EUN	1.9 km	MPC · JPL
534592	2014 UE_{187}	—	October 28, 2014	Haleakala	Pan-STARRS 1	·	670 m	MPC · JPL
534593	2014 UK_{187}	—	March 16, 2012	Catalina	CSS	·	2.5 km	MPC · JPL
534594	2014 UZ_{188}	—	November 15, 2010	Mount Lemmon	Mount Lemmon Survey	·	1.2 km	MPC · JPL
534595	2014 UO_{189}	—	October 28, 2014	Mount Lemmon	Mount Lemmon Survey	·	1.4 km	MPC · JPL
534596	2014 UR_{190}	—	October 3, 2014	Mount Lemmon	Mount Lemmon Survey	·	1.2 km	MPC · JPL
534597	2014 UA_{193}	—	August 29, 2005	Kitt Peak	Spacewatch	MAR	1.5 km	MPC · JPL
534598	2014 UQ_{197}	—	November 17, 2006	Kitt Peak	Spacewatch	(5)	720 m	MPC · JPL
534599	2014 UT_{197}	—	December 18, 2007	Kitt Peak	Spacewatch	·	700 m	MPC · JPL
534600	2014 UX_{198}	—	November 16, 2006	Kitt Peak	Spacewatch	·	660 m	MPC · JPL

== 534601–534700 ==
back to top

Designation			Discovery			Properties		Ref
Permanent	Provisional	Named after	Date	Site	Discoverer(s)	Category	Diam.	Ref
534601	2014 UC_{199}	—	November 2, 2010	Kitt Peak	Spacewatch	·	1.7 km	MPC · JPL
534602	2014 UL_{199}	—	September 16, 2010	Mount Lemmon	Mount Lemmon Survey	V	620 m	MPC · JPL
534603	2014 UQ_{199}	—	February 16, 2012	Haleakala	Pan-STARRS 1	·	920 m	MPC · JPL
534604	2014 UV_{200}	—	April 3, 2008	Mount Lemmon	Mount Lemmon Survey	·	1.3 km	MPC · JPL
534605	2014 UQ_{202}	—	December 14, 2010	Mount Lemmon	Mount Lemmon Survey	·	1.1 km	MPC · JPL
534606	2014 UA_{203}	—	October 29, 2014	Catalina	CSS	·	2.1 km	MPC · JPL
534607	2014 UB_{203}	—	June 27, 2014	Haleakala	Pan-STARRS 1	·	1.3 km	MPC · JPL
534608	2014 UG_{203}	—	October 29, 2014	Catalina	CSS	·	1.3 km	MPC · JPL
534609	2014 UJ_{203}	—	December 5, 2005	Kitt Peak	Spacewatch	·	3.3 km	MPC · JPL
534610	2014 UR_{203}	—	October 22, 2014	Kitt Peak	Spacewatch	·	490 m	MPC · JPL
534611	2014 UC_{204}	—	March 31, 2009	Mount Lemmon	Mount Lemmon Survey	·	650 m	MPC · JPL
534612	2014 UJ_{206}	—	November 25, 2006	Mount Lemmon	Mount Lemmon Survey	·	1.4 km	MPC · JPL
534613	2014 UR_{206}	—	September 23, 2006	Kitt Peak	Spacewatch	·	730 m	MPC · JPL
534614	2014 UU_{206}	—	November 12, 2010	Kitt Peak	Spacewatch	·	1.2 km	MPC · JPL
534615	2014 UQ_{208}	—	October 21, 2014	Kitt Peak	Spacewatch	·	1.5 km	MPC · JPL
534616	2014 UX_{208}	—	October 18, 2014	Mount Lemmon	Mount Lemmon Survey	·	850 m	MPC · JPL
534617	2014 UE_{209}	—	February 9, 2007	Mount Lemmon	Mount Lemmon Survey	·	920 m	MPC · JPL
534618	2014 UR_{210}	—	November 3, 2010	Mount Lemmon	Mount Lemmon Survey	·	1.8 km	MPC · JPL
534619	2014 US_{214}	—	October 22, 2003	Kitt Peak	Spacewatch	·	3.8 km	MPC · JPL
534620	2014 UW_{215}	—	May 2, 2013	Kitt Peak	Spacewatch	EUN	1.0 km	MPC · JPL
534621	2014 UY_{215}	—	October 21, 2014	Catalina	CSS	·	1.4 km	MPC · JPL
534622	2014 UE_{216}	—	August 29, 2014	Haleakala	Pan-STARRS 1	EUN	1.3 km	MPC · JPL
534623	2014 UM_{217}	—	November 1, 2010	Mount Lemmon	Mount Lemmon Survey	·	1.6 km	MPC · JPL
534624	2014 UR_{223}	—	December 26, 2011	Kitt Peak	Spacewatch	·	890 m	MPC · JPL
534625	2014 UQ_{224}	—	October 26, 2014	Haleakala	Pan-STARRS 1	cubewano (cold) · moon	267 km	MPC · JPL
534626	2014 UT_{224}	—	October 25, 2014	Haleakala	Pan-STARRS 1	twotino	175 km	MPC · JPL
534627	2014 UV_{224}	—	October 28, 2014	Haleakala	Pan-STARRS 1	res · 3:11	218 km	MPC · JPL
534628	2014 UR_{227}	—	December 20, 2007	Kitt Peak	Spacewatch	·	990 m	MPC · JPL
534629	2014 UV_{227}	—	December 4, 2005	Catalina	CSS	HNS	1.5 km	MPC · JPL
534630	2014 UX_{227}	—	December 2, 1999	Kitt Peak	Spacewatch	·	1.8 km	MPC · JPL
534631	2014 UX_{229}	—	October 22, 2014	Mauna Kea	OSSOS	plutino	80 km	MPC · JPL
534632	2014 UG_{230}	—	November 6, 2010	Mount Lemmon	Mount Lemmon Survey	·	770 m	MPC · JPL
534633	2014 UK_{230}	—	October 28, 2014	Haleakala	Pan-STARRS 1	·	1.3 km	MPC · JPL
534634	2014 UP_{230}	—	October 13, 2007	Mount Lemmon	Mount Lemmon Survey	·	780 m	MPC · JPL
534635	2014 US_{230}	—	November 12, 2001	Socorro	LINEAR	·	3.0 km	MPC · JPL
534636	2014 UT_{230}	—	September 16, 2010	Mount Lemmon	Mount Lemmon Survey	·	1.1 km	MPC · JPL
534637	2014 UW_{230}	—	February 10, 2008	Mount Lemmon	Mount Lemmon Survey	EUN	1.5 km	MPC · JPL
534638	2014 UB_{232}	—	January 29, 2003	Apache Point	SDSS	·	1.2 km	MPC · JPL
534639	2014 UF_{232}	—	January 10, 2007	Mount Lemmon	Mount Lemmon Survey	·	1.2 km	MPC · JPL
534640	2014 UK_{232}	—	April 5, 2008	Mount Lemmon	Mount Lemmon Survey	·	1.7 km	MPC · JPL
534641	2014 UN_{232}	—	October 15, 2001	Palomar	NEAT	·	1.2 km	MPC · JPL
534642	2014 UZ_{232}	—	September 15, 2010	Mount Lemmon	Mount Lemmon Survey	V	550 m	MPC · JPL
534643	2014 UB_{233}	—	October 24, 2014	Mount Lemmon	Mount Lemmon Survey	V	450 m	MPC · JPL
534644	2014 UE_{233}	—	February 3, 2012	Haleakala	Pan-STARRS 1	·	1.1 km	MPC · JPL
534645	2014 UP_{233}	—	October 16, 2014	Mount Lemmon	Mount Lemmon Survey	·	1.3 km	MPC · JPL
534646	2014 UA_{234}	—	February 28, 2008	Mount Lemmon	Mount Lemmon Survey	·	860 m	MPC · JPL
534647	2014 UH_{234}	—	October 21, 2014	Kitt Peak	Spacewatch	·	590 m	MPC · JPL
534648	2014 UL_{234}	—	July 27, 2009	Kitt Peak	Spacewatch	·	1.1 km	MPC · JPL
534649	2014 UQ_{234}	—	October 22, 2014	Kitt Peak	Spacewatch	·	1.2 km	MPC · JPL
534650	2014 UY_{234}	—	May 14, 2004	Kitt Peak	Spacewatch	·	1.1 km	MPC · JPL
534651	2014 UZ_{234}	—	October 22, 2014	Mount Lemmon	Mount Lemmon Survey	EUN	1.0 km	MPC · JPL
534652	2014 UD_{236}	—	August 30, 2005	Kitt Peak	Spacewatch	·	1.2 km	MPC · JPL
534653	2014 UH_{236}	—	December 5, 2010	Mount Lemmon	Mount Lemmon Survey	·	820 m	MPC · JPL
534654	2014 UR_{236}	—	October 26, 2014	Mount Lemmon	Mount Lemmon Survey	·	1.8 km	MPC · JPL
534655	2014 US_{236}	—	October 26, 2014	Mount Lemmon	Mount Lemmon Survey	·	1.4 km	MPC · JPL
534656	2014 UZ_{236}	—	October 26, 2014	Mount Lemmon	Mount Lemmon Survey	EUN	920 m	MPC · JPL
534657	2014 UD_{237}	—	October 26, 2014	Haleakala	Pan-STARRS 1	·	1.6 km	MPC · JPL
534658	2014 UO_{237}	—	January 4, 2012	Mount Lemmon	Mount Lemmon Survey	·	550 m	MPC · JPL
534659	2014 UT_{237}	—	October 22, 2006	Kitt Peak	Spacewatch	·	990 m	MPC · JPL
534660	2014 UV_{237}	—	January 11, 2008	Kitt Peak	Spacewatch	·	910 m	MPC · JPL
534661	2014 UG_{238}	—	October 28, 2014	Haleakala	Pan-STARRS 1	MAR	1.0 km	MPC · JPL
534662	2014 UM_{238}	—	March 17, 2012	Mount Lemmon	Mount Lemmon Survey	·	1.2 km	MPC · JPL
534663	2014 UN_{238}	—	October 17, 2010	Mount Lemmon	Mount Lemmon Survey	·	1.2 km	MPC · JPL
534664	2014 UV_{238}	—	October 28, 2014	Haleakala	Pan-STARRS 1	·	980 m	MPC · JPL
534665	2014 UG_{239}	—	November 4, 2010	Bisei	BATTeRS	·	1.2 km	MPC · JPL
534666	2014 UE_{240}	—	July 16, 2013	Haleakala	Pan-STARRS 1	·	1.7 km	MPC · JPL
534667	2014 UF_{240}	—	October 30, 2014	Mount Lemmon	Mount Lemmon Survey	ADE	1.4 km	MPC · JPL
534668	2014 UH_{240}	—	October 30, 2014	Mount Lemmon	Mount Lemmon Survey	·	1.5 km	MPC · JPL
534669	2014 UK_{240}	—	October 30, 2014	Mount Lemmon	Mount Lemmon Survey	·	1.4 km	MPC · JPL
534670	2014 UA_{241}	—	October 25, 2014	Kitt Peak	Spacewatch	·	700 m	MPC · JPL
534671	2014 UB_{241}	—	October 28, 2014	Haleakala	Pan-STARRS 1	·	490 m	MPC · JPL
534672	2014 VW	—	December 15, 2001	Socorro	LINEAR	JUN	910 m	MPC · JPL
534673	2014 VX	—	November 3, 2014	Mount Lemmon	Mount Lemmon Survey	·	1.3 km	MPC · JPL
534674	2014 VX_{1}	—	March 1, 2011	Catalina	CSS	·	1.3 km	MPC · JPL
534675	2014 VF_{2}	—	September 4, 2008	Kitt Peak	Spacewatch	·	2.3 km	MPC · JPL
534676	2014 VK_{2}	—	November 9, 2014	Haleakala	Pan-STARRS 1	APO	690 m	MPC · JPL
534677	2014 VJ_{6}	—	December 5, 2010	Mount Lemmon	Mount Lemmon Survey	·	1.1 km	MPC · JPL
534678	2014 VW_{6}	—	March 13, 2007	Kitt Peak	Spacewatch	·	1.3 km	MPC · JPL
534679	2014 VQ_{7}	—	November 22, 2006	Kitt Peak	Spacewatch	(5)	700 m	MPC · JPL
534680	2014 VX_{7}	—	October 30, 2005	Kitt Peak	Spacewatch	·	2.0 km	MPC · JPL
534681	2014 VD_{8}	—	October 3, 2014	Mount Lemmon	Mount Lemmon Survey	·	1.3 km	MPC · JPL
534682	2014 VL_{8}	—	April 27, 2012	Haleakala	Pan-STARRS 1	·	1 km	MPC · JPL
534683	2014 VD_{9}	—	November 12, 2006	Mount Lemmon	Mount Lemmon Survey	·	770 m	MPC · JPL
534684	2014 VL_{9}	—	September 22, 2009	Kitt Peak	Spacewatch	·	1.6 km	MPC · JPL
534685	2014 VY_{9}	—	November 12, 2014	Haleakala	Pan-STARRS 1	·	1.7 km	MPC · JPL
534686	2014 VK_{10}	—	February 26, 2012	Kitt Peak	Spacewatch	·	1.1 km	MPC · JPL
534687	2014 VZ_{11}	—	February 11, 2004	Kitt Peak	Spacewatch	·	980 m	MPC · JPL
534688	2014 VF_{12}	—	September 29, 2009	Kitt Peak	Spacewatch	·	2.5 km	MPC · JPL
534689	2014 VA_{13}	—	November 3, 2010	Kitt Peak	Spacewatch	·	1.1 km	MPC · JPL
534690	2014 VB_{13}	—	November 23, 1995	Kitt Peak	Spacewatch	·	1.0 km	MPC · JPL
534691	2014 VF_{13}	—	October 21, 2006	Mount Lemmon	Mount Lemmon Survey	·	1.9 km	MPC · JPL
534692	2014 VO_{13}	—	December 18, 2001	Socorro	LINEAR	·	1.5 km	MPC · JPL
534693	2014 VP_{13}	—	October 19, 2003	Kitt Peak	Spacewatch	NYS	910 m	MPC · JPL
534694	2014 VS_{13}	—	April 27, 2008	Kitt Peak	Spacewatch	·	1.8 km	MPC · JPL
534695	2014 VT_{13}	—	April 15, 2013	Haleakala	Pan-STARRS 1	·	1.6 km	MPC · JPL
534696	2014 VV_{13}	—	August 31, 2014	Haleakala	Pan-STARRS 1	·	1.0 km	MPC · JPL
534697	2014 VW_{13}	—	December 6, 2010	Mount Lemmon	Mount Lemmon Survey	·	1.9 km	MPC · JPL
534698	2014 VG_{14}	—	April 27, 2012	Haleakala	Pan-STARRS 1	·	2.1 km	MPC · JPL
534699	2014 VW_{14}	—	October 20, 2014	Mount Lemmon	Mount Lemmon Survey	·	1.7 km	MPC · JPL
534700	2014 VB_{15}	—	September 18, 2010	Kitt Peak	Spacewatch	·	920 m	MPC · JPL

== 534701–534800 ==
back to top

Designation			Discovery			Properties		Ref
Permanent	Provisional	Named after	Date	Site	Discoverer(s)	Category	Diam.	Ref
534701	2014 VR_{15}	—	September 15, 2007	Mount Lemmon	Mount Lemmon Survey	·	1.2 km	MPC · JPL
534702	2014 VP_{19}	—	November 16, 2006	Mount Lemmon	Mount Lemmon Survey	·	1.1 km	MPC · JPL
534703	2014 VC_{20}	—	January 30, 2012	Kitt Peak	Spacewatch	·	530 m	MPC · JPL
534704	2014 VF_{20}	—	November 5, 2007	Mount Lemmon	Mount Lemmon Survey	·	790 m	MPC · JPL
534705	2014 VL_{20}	—	November 5, 2007	Mount Lemmon	Mount Lemmon Survey	·	850 m	MPC · JPL
534706	2014 VO_{20}	—	June 17, 2013	Haleakala	Pan-STARRS 1	·	1.6 km	MPC · JPL
534707	2014 VT_{21}	—	February 27, 2012	Kitt Peak	Spacewatch	·	750 m	MPC · JPL
534708	2014 VQ_{22}	—	January 11, 2008	Kitt Peak	Spacewatch	·	740 m	MPC · JPL
534709	2014 VZ_{22}	—	September 29, 1992	Kitt Peak	Spacewatch	MAS	670 m	MPC · JPL
534710	2014 VA_{23}	—	December 13, 2007	Socorro	LINEAR	·	980 m	MPC · JPL
534711	2014 VR_{23}	—	October 29, 2003	Kitt Peak	Spacewatch	·	1.0 km	MPC · JPL
534712	2014 VY_{23}	—	November 18, 2001	Kitt Peak	Spacewatch	·	1.2 km	MPC · JPL
534713	2014 VN_{24}	—	November 12, 2014	Haleakala	Pan-STARRS 1	(5)	1.3 km	MPC · JPL
534714	2014 VT_{24}	—	June 1, 2008	Kitt Peak	Spacewatch	HNS	900 m	MPC · JPL
534715	2014 VG_{25}	—	December 3, 2010	Catalina	CSS	·	1.7 km	MPC · JPL
534716	2014 VH_{25}	—	October 22, 2014	Mount Lemmon	Mount Lemmon Survey	·	1.1 km	MPC · JPL
534717	2014 VT_{26}	—	November 20, 2001	Socorro	LINEAR	·	1.7 km	MPC · JPL
534718	2014 VC_{27}	—	November 19, 2003	Kitt Peak	Spacewatch	NYS	960 m	MPC · JPL
534719	2014 VK_{27}	—	November 15, 2010	Kitt Peak	Spacewatch	·	1.1 km	MPC · JPL
534720	2014 VV_{27}	—	February 2, 2008	Kitt Peak	Spacewatch	NYS	1.0 km	MPC · JPL
534721	2014 VC_{31}	—	February 2, 2008	Kitt Peak	Spacewatch	·	1.1 km	MPC · JPL
534722	2014 VC_{32}	—	October 19, 2014	Kitt Peak	Spacewatch	·	1.3 km	MPC · JPL
534723	2014 VL_{32}	—	November 14, 2014	Kitt Peak	Spacewatch	·	1.3 km	MPC · JPL
534724	2014 VM_{32}	—	November 14, 2014	Kitt Peak	Spacewatch	·	980 m	MPC · JPL
534725	2014 VT_{32}	—	October 25, 2005	Kitt Peak	Spacewatch	·	1.5 km	MPC · JPL
534726	2014 VN_{37}	—	December 16, 2006	Mount Lemmon	Mount Lemmon Survey	·	1.5 km	MPC · JPL
534727	2014 VJ_{38}	—	October 23, 2006	Mount Lemmon	Mount Lemmon Survey	·	1.5 km	MPC · JPL
534728	2014 VK_{38}	—	November 14, 2010	Kitt Peak	Spacewatch	·	980 m	MPC · JPL
534729	2014 VM_{38}	—	October 13, 2007	Mount Lemmon	Mount Lemmon Survey	·	580 m	MPC · JPL
534730	2014 VV_{38}	—	November 6, 2010	Mount Lemmon	Mount Lemmon Survey	·	1.9 km	MPC · JPL
534731	2014 VW_{38}	—	December 11, 2009	Mount Lemmon	Mount Lemmon Survey	·	2.4 km	MPC · JPL
534732	2014 VX_{38}	—	October 7, 2007	Mount Lemmon	Mount Lemmon Survey	·	580 m	MPC · JPL
534733	2014 WL	—	August 31, 2014	Haleakala	Pan-STARRS 1	NYS	820 m	MPC · JPL
534734	2014 WA_{2}	—	September 14, 2005	Kitt Peak	Spacewatch	·	1.1 km	MPC · JPL
534735	2014 WX_{2}	—	July 28, 2014	Haleakala	Pan-STARRS 1	RAF	950 m	MPC · JPL
534736	2014 WB_{3}	—	August 31, 2014	Haleakala	Pan-STARRS 1	(5)	1.2 km	MPC · JPL
534737	2014 WN_{3}	—	December 16, 2006	Mount Lemmon	Mount Lemmon Survey	·	1.3 km	MPC · JPL
534738	2014 WP_{3}	—	December 2, 2010	Mount Lemmon	Mount Lemmon Survey	(5)	1.1 km	MPC · JPL
534739	2014 WA_{4}	—	December 23, 2006	Mount Lemmon	Mount Lemmon Survey	·	770 m	MPC · JPL
534740	2014 WF_{4}	—	January 27, 2012	Kitt Peak	Spacewatch	·	510 m	MPC · JPL
534741	2014 WJ_{4}	—	March 15, 2004	Kitt Peak	Spacewatch	·	1.7 km	MPC · JPL
534742	2014 WQ_{8}	—	November 15, 2006	Kitt Peak	Spacewatch	·	680 m	MPC · JPL
534743	2014 WH_{12}	—	September 24, 2014	Catalina	CSS	·	1.4 km	MPC · JPL
534744	2014 WB_{16}	—	March 26, 2008	Mount Lemmon	Mount Lemmon Survey	·	1.0 km	MPC · JPL
534745	2014 WW_{16}	—	November 30, 2003	Kitt Peak	Spacewatch	·	800 m	MPC · JPL
534746	2014 WF_{19}	—	October 30, 2014	Haleakala	Pan-STARRS 1	·	1.1 km	MPC · JPL
534747	2014 WP_{19}	—	December 21, 2006	Mount Lemmon	Mount Lemmon Survey	·	950 m	MPC · JPL
534748	2014 WA_{20}	—	November 1, 2007	Kitt Peak	Spacewatch	·	910 m	MPC · JPL
534749	2014 WS_{23}	—	March 29, 2008	Mount Lemmon	Mount Lemmon Survey	·	1.2 km	MPC · JPL
534750	2014 WD_{24}	—	July 27, 2014	Haleakala	Pan-STARRS 1	·	1.1 km	MPC · JPL
534751	2014 WO_{24}	—	October 16, 2007	Mount Lemmon	Mount Lemmon Survey	·	670 m	MPC · JPL
534752	2014 WC_{25}	—	September 27, 2006	Mount Lemmon	Mount Lemmon Survey	·	1.5 km	MPC · JPL
534753	2014 WG_{29}	—	November 17, 2014	Mount Lemmon	Mount Lemmon Survey	·	1.4 km	MPC · JPL
534754	2014 WP_{30}	—	June 30, 2013	Haleakala	Pan-STARRS 1	HNS	1.3 km	MPC · JPL
534755	2014 WY_{43}	—	September 21, 2001	Kitt Peak	Spacewatch	·	1.6 km	MPC · JPL
534756	2014 WN_{47}	—	August 10, 2010	Kitt Peak	Spacewatch	MAS	580 m	MPC · JPL
534757	2014 WH_{49}	—	December 14, 2010	Mount Lemmon	Mount Lemmon Survey	·	880 m	MPC · JPL
534758	2014 WO_{49}	—	October 24, 2007	Mount Lemmon	Mount Lemmon Survey	·	690 m	MPC · JPL
534759	2014 WT_{50}	—	October 18, 2014	Mount Lemmon	Mount Lemmon Survey	·	2.0 km	MPC · JPL
534760	2014 WA_{51}	—	January 19, 2012	Haleakala	Pan-STARRS 1	·	580 m	MPC · JPL
534761	2014 WM_{53}	—	November 12, 1999	Socorro	LINEAR	NYS	780 m	MPC · JPL
534762	2014 WF_{54}	—	April 27, 2012	Haleakala	Pan-STARRS 1	·	1.3 km	MPC · JPL
534763	2014 WM_{54}	—	August 28, 2005	Kitt Peak	Spacewatch	·	1.3 km	MPC · JPL
534764	2014 WZ_{55}	—	January 15, 2007	Catalina	CSS	·	1.4 km	MPC · JPL
534765	2014 WF_{56}	—	June 12, 2008	Kitt Peak	Spacewatch	·	2.7 km	MPC · JPL
534766	2014 WL_{56}	—	October 23, 2014	Kitt Peak	Spacewatch	·	500 m	MPC · JPL
534767	2014 WV_{58}	—	August 30, 2005	Kitt Peak	Spacewatch	·	1.2 km	MPC · JPL
534768	2014 WH_{59}	—	November 25, 2005	Kitt Peak	Spacewatch	·	2.1 km	MPC · JPL
534769	2014 WS_{60}	—	December 13, 2010	Mount Lemmon	Mount Lemmon Survey	·	1.2 km	MPC · JPL
534770	2014 WZ_{60}	—	November 8, 2010	Mount Lemmon	Mount Lemmon Survey	·	1.0 km	MPC · JPL
534771	2014 WQ_{62}	—	April 15, 2013	Haleakala	Pan-STARRS 1	·	1.5 km	MPC · JPL
534772	2014 WP_{63}	—	November 9, 2007	Kitt Peak	Spacewatch	MAS	490 m	MPC · JPL
534773	2014 WZ_{64}	—	June 9, 2010	WISE	WISE	·	1.8 km	MPC · JPL
534774	2014 WD_{65}	—	November 8, 2010	Kitt Peak	Spacewatch	(5)	790 m	MPC · JPL
534775	2014 WK_{65}	—	October 8, 2010	Kitt Peak	Spacewatch	NYS	880 m	MPC · JPL
534776	2014 WM_{65}	—	February 12, 2004	Kitt Peak	Spacewatch	·	930 m	MPC · JPL
534777	2014 WT_{66}	—	November 15, 1995	Kitt Peak	Spacewatch	·	950 m	MPC · JPL
534778	2014 WX_{68}	—	April 16, 2013	Haleakala	Pan-STARRS 1	·	1.0 km	MPC · JPL
534779	2014 WX_{71}	—	October 18, 2014	Mount Lemmon	Mount Lemmon Survey	·	520 m	MPC · JPL
534780	2014 WC_{73}	—	November 18, 2006	Kitt Peak	Spacewatch	·	1.0 km	MPC · JPL
534781	2014 WF_{75}	—	June 4, 2013	Mount Lemmon	Mount Lemmon Survey	KON	1.6 km	MPC · JPL
534782	2014 WQ_{75}	—	January 2, 2012	Kitt Peak	Spacewatch	·	480 m	MPC · JPL
534783	2014 WT_{78}	—	January 13, 2008	Kitt Peak	Spacewatch	NYS	660 m	MPC · JPL
534784	2014 WX_{78}	—	April 23, 2004	Campo Imperatore	CINEOS	MAR	1.2 km	MPC · JPL
534785	2014 WV_{79}	—	November 5, 2007	Mount Lemmon	Mount Lemmon Survey	·	840 m	MPC · JPL
534786	2014 WX_{79}	—	September 3, 2010	Mount Lemmon	Mount Lemmon Survey	MAS	510 m	MPC · JPL
534787	2014 WE_{81}	—	March 30, 2008	Kitt Peak	Spacewatch	·	1.1 km	MPC · JPL
534788	2014 WO_{83}	—	March 8, 2008	Mount Lemmon	Mount Lemmon Survey	·	990 m	MPC · JPL
534789	2014 WM_{84}	—	November 4, 2004	Kitt Peak	Spacewatch	·	470 m	MPC · JPL
534790	2014 WZ_{95}	—	December 13, 2010	Mount Lemmon	Mount Lemmon Survey	KON	1.7 km	MPC · JPL
534791	2014 WR_{97}	—	November 19, 2006	Kitt Peak	Spacewatch	·	850 m	MPC · JPL
534792	2014 WP_{102}	—	October 2, 2014	Haleakala	Pan-STARRS 1	L5	6.7 km	MPC · JPL
534793	2014 WJ_{107}	—	September 18, 2010	Mount Lemmon	Mount Lemmon Survey	·	990 m	MPC · JPL
534794	2014 WR_{110}	—	December 1, 2010	Mount Lemmon	Mount Lemmon Survey	·	1.4 km	MPC · JPL
534795	2014 WR_{111}	—	June 18, 2013	Haleakala	Pan-STARRS 1	·	1.5 km	MPC · JPL
534796	2014 WL_{112}	—	October 5, 2005	Mount Lemmon	Mount Lemmon Survey	·	1.2 km	MPC · JPL
534797	2014 WD_{116}	—	November 18, 2006	Mount Lemmon	Mount Lemmon Survey	EUN	650 m	MPC · JPL
534798	2014 WO_{116}	—	March 13, 2005	Kitt Peak	Spacewatch	·	1.1 km	MPC · JPL
534799	2014 WV_{116}	—	October 31, 2006	Mount Lemmon	Mount Lemmon Survey	·	770 m	MPC · JPL
534800	2014 WN_{117}	—	November 7, 2010	Mount Lemmon	Mount Lemmon Survey	·	850 m	MPC · JPL

== 534801–534900 ==
back to top

Designation			Discovery			Properties		Ref
Permanent	Provisional	Named after	Date	Site	Discoverer(s)	Category	Diam.	Ref
534801	2014 WM_{118}	—	January 2, 2011	Catalina	CSS	·	1.5 km	MPC · JPL
534802	2014 WD_{119}	—	September 23, 2009	Kitt Peak	Spacewatch	·	2.0 km	MPC · JPL
534803	2014 WN_{119}	—	September 29, 2005	Catalina	CSS	·	2.6 km	MPC · JPL
534804	2014 WB_{120}	—	August 31, 2014	Haleakala	Pan-STARRS 1	·	1.3 km	MPC · JPL
534805	2014 WK_{121}	—	January 29, 2012	Kitt Peak	Spacewatch	·	910 m	MPC · JPL
534806	2014 WM_{121}	—	December 3, 2010	Mount Lemmon	Mount Lemmon Survey	·	1.5 km	MPC · JPL
534807	2014 WP_{122}	—	March 15, 2007	Mount Lemmon	Mount Lemmon Survey	·	2.3 km	MPC · JPL
534808	2014 WG_{123}	—	October 8, 1993	Kitt Peak	Spacewatch	(5)	1.3 km	MPC · JPL
534809	2014 WU_{123}	—	April 24, 2008	Mount Lemmon	Mount Lemmon Survey	KON	2.7 km	MPC · JPL
534810	2014 WD_{126}	—	July 14, 2009	Kitt Peak	Spacewatch	·	1.5 km	MPC · JPL
534811	2014 WY_{127}	—	February 26, 2012	Haleakala	Pan-STARRS 1	·	550 m	MPC · JPL
534812	2014 WD_{128}	—	November 1, 2014	Mount Lemmon	Mount Lemmon Survey	EUN	1.3 km	MPC · JPL
534813	2014 WF_{128}	—	December 15, 2006	Kitt Peak	Spacewatch	BRG	1.1 km	MPC · JPL
534814	2014 WN_{132}	—	March 1, 2009	Kitt Peak	Spacewatch	·	470 m	MPC · JPL
534815	2014 WY_{138}	—	January 16, 2011	Mount Lemmon	Mount Lemmon Survey	·	1.2 km	MPC · JPL
534816	2014 WY_{139}	—	February 27, 2012	Haleakala	Pan-STARRS 1	·	700 m	MPC · JPL
534817	2014 WC_{145}	—	November 17, 2014	Haleakala	Pan-STARRS 1	·	1.4 km	MPC · JPL
534818	2014 WH_{159}	—	September 9, 2014	Haleakala	Pan-STARRS 1	(5)	1.3 km	MPC · JPL
534819	2014 WT_{159}	—	May 11, 2003	Kitt Peak	Spacewatch	·	2.0 km	MPC · JPL
534820	2014 WW_{159}	—	September 2, 2010	Mount Lemmon	Mount Lemmon Survey	·	750 m	MPC · JPL
534821	2014 WB_{160}	—	September 6, 2014	Mount Lemmon	Mount Lemmon Survey	·	1.3 km	MPC · JPL
534822	2014 WV_{162}	—	September 30, 2014	Mount Lemmon	Mount Lemmon Survey	NYS	830 m	MPC · JPL
534823	2014 WM_{163}	—	August 31, 2005	Kitt Peak	Spacewatch	·	1.3 km	MPC · JPL
534824	2014 WV_{164}	—	December 13, 2010	Mount Lemmon	Mount Lemmon Survey	EUN	1.1 km	MPC · JPL
534825	2014 WU_{165}	—	November 25, 2006	Mount Lemmon	Mount Lemmon Survey	(5)	1.2 km	MPC · JPL
534826	2014 WC_{167}	—	August 31, 2014	Haleakala	Pan-STARRS 1	·	640 m	MPC · JPL
534827	2014 WZ_{168}	—	March 27, 2003	Kitt Peak	Spacewatch	·	1.4 km	MPC · JPL
534828	2014 WZ_{178}	—	December 10, 2010	Mount Lemmon	Mount Lemmon Survey	·	1.4 km	MPC · JPL
534829	2014 WR_{179}	—	October 17, 2007	Anderson Mesa	LONEOS	·	610 m	MPC · JPL
534830	2014 WV_{180}	—	November 20, 2014	Mount Lemmon	Mount Lemmon Survey	·	1.2 km	MPC · JPL
534831	2014 WD_{184}	—	November 4, 2005	Kitt Peak	Spacewatch	·	1.3 km	MPC · JPL
534832	2014 WH_{190}	—	November 1, 2006	Mount Lemmon	Mount Lemmon Survey	·	750 m	MPC · JPL
534833	2014 WY_{191}	—	November 20, 2014	Haleakala	Pan-STARRS 1	EUN	780 m	MPC · JPL
534834	2014 WM_{192}	—	September 22, 2014	Haleakala	Pan-STARRS 1	EUN	1.1 km	MPC · JPL
534835	2014 WK_{193}	—	September 24, 2009	Mount Lemmon	Mount Lemmon Survey	·	1.6 km	MPC · JPL
534836	2014 WQ_{197}	—	January 12, 2011	Mount Lemmon	Mount Lemmon Survey	·	760 m	MPC · JPL
534837	2014 WK_{198}	—	September 22, 2014	Haleakala	Pan-STARRS 1	·	1.4 km	MPC · JPL
534838	2014 WE_{200}	—	December 3, 2010	Kitt Peak	Spacewatch	·	1.7 km	MPC · JPL
534839	2014 WN_{200}	—	July 31, 2014	Haleakala	Pan-STARRS 1	·	1.6 km	MPC · JPL
534840	2014 WE_{202}	—	November 8, 2010	Mount Lemmon	Mount Lemmon Survey	·	2.1 km	MPC · JPL
534841	2014 WY_{202}	—	July 31, 2014	Haleakala	Pan-STARRS 1	·	1.1 km	MPC · JPL
534842	2014 WN_{203}	—	November 1, 2014	Mount Lemmon	Mount Lemmon Survey	·	1.1 km	MPC · JPL
534843	2014 WG_{205}	—	November 30, 2010	Mount Lemmon	Mount Lemmon Survey	·	1.3 km	MPC · JPL
534844	2014 WJ_{205}	—	February 3, 2012	Haleakala	Pan-STARRS 1	·	430 m	MPC · JPL
534845	2014 WV_{210}	—	September 14, 2009	Catalina	CSS	·	2.1 km	MPC · JPL
534846	2014 WL_{211}	—	September 20, 2009	Kitt Peak	Spacewatch	·	1.8 km	MPC · JPL
534847	2014 WV_{211}	—	October 1, 2005	Kitt Peak	Spacewatch	·	1.1 km	MPC · JPL
534848	2014 WX_{211}	—	December 8, 2010	Kitt Peak	Spacewatch	(5)	700 m	MPC · JPL
534849	2014 WP_{216}	—	November 12, 2014	Haleakala	Pan-STARRS 1	·	1.1 km	MPC · JPL
534850	2014 WA_{218}	—	November 11, 2006	Mount Lemmon	Mount Lemmon Survey	·	970 m	MPC · JPL
534851	2014 WG_{218}	—	October 14, 2010	Mount Lemmon	Mount Lemmon Survey	·	1.5 km	MPC · JPL
534852	2014 WJ_{218}	—	April 28, 2012	Mount Lemmon	Mount Lemmon Survey	EUN	1.0 km	MPC · JPL
534853	2014 WB_{222}	—	December 31, 2007	Kitt Peak	Spacewatch	·	850 m	MPC · JPL
534854	2014 WZ_{225}	—	December 14, 2010	Mount Lemmon	Mount Lemmon Survey	·	1.0 km	MPC · JPL
534855	2014 WA_{226}	—	May 12, 2012	Haleakala	Pan-STARRS 1	·	2.3 km	MPC · JPL
534856	2014 WX_{226}	—	November 3, 1999	Kitt Peak	Spacewatch	·	800 m	MPC · JPL
534857	2014 WM_{227}	—	July 10, 2010	WISE	WISE	·	1.1 km	MPC · JPL
534858	2014 WL_{231}	—	October 4, 2014	Catalina	CSS	·	1.8 km	MPC · JPL
534859	2014 WW_{231}	—	February 21, 2012	Kitt Peak	Spacewatch	·	910 m	MPC · JPL
534860	2014 WY_{231}	—	October 10, 2005	Catalina	CSS	·	1.9 km	MPC · JPL
534861	2014 WC_{233}	—	August 31, 2005	Kitt Peak	Spacewatch	·	1.2 km	MPC · JPL
534862	2014 WE_{233}	—	January 13, 2005	Kitt Peak	Spacewatch	·	570 m	MPC · JPL
534863	2014 WX_{234}	—	November 5, 2010	Mount Lemmon	Mount Lemmon Survey	·	1.8 km	MPC · JPL
534864	2014 WD_{237}	—	October 31, 2005	Mount Lemmon	Mount Lemmon Survey	EUN	890 m	MPC · JPL
534865	2014 WX_{241}	—	May 8, 2013	Haleakala	Pan-STARRS 1	·	1.4 km	MPC · JPL
534866	2014 WT_{251}	—	January 2, 2011	Catalina	CSS	·	1.6 km	MPC · JPL
534867	2014 WW_{252}	—	December 6, 2010	Mount Lemmon	Mount Lemmon Survey	·	1.1 km	MPC · JPL
534868	2014 WY_{253}	—	January 27, 2012	Mount Lemmon	Mount Lemmon Survey	V	490 m	MPC · JPL
534869	2014 WU_{259}	—	October 3, 2014	Mount Lemmon	Mount Lemmon Survey	EUN	1.0 km	MPC · JPL
534870	2014 WO_{261}	—	October 3, 2014	Mount Lemmon	Mount Lemmon Survey	KON	2.0 km	MPC · JPL
534871	2014 WR_{266}	—	September 22, 2014	Haleakala	Pan-STARRS 1	·	1.5 km	MPC · JPL
534872	2014 WS_{270}	—	November 8, 2010	Mount Lemmon	Mount Lemmon Survey	·	900 m	MPC · JPL
534873	2014 WX_{270}	—	February 17, 2007	Mount Lemmon	Mount Lemmon Survey	·	1.0 km	MPC · JPL
534874	2014 WM_{271}	—	December 3, 2010	Kitt Peak	Spacewatch	·	1.2 km	MPC · JPL
534875	2014 WA_{272}	—	January 27, 2007	Kitt Peak	Spacewatch	·	1.4 km	MPC · JPL
534876	2014 WR_{276}	—	September 4, 2014	Haleakala	Pan-STARRS 1	EUN	1.2 km	MPC · JPL
534877	2014 WD_{280}	—	March 27, 2010	WISE	WISE	·	2.7 km	MPC · JPL
534878	2014 WC_{281}	—	December 4, 2010	Mount Lemmon	Mount Lemmon Survey	·	1.2 km	MPC · JPL
534879	2014 WN_{282}	—	February 13, 2009	Kitt Peak	Spacewatch	·	1.6 km	MPC · JPL
534880	2014 WU_{284}	—	September 4, 2014	Haleakala	Pan-STARRS 1	·	1.8 km	MPC · JPL
534881	2014 WJ_{285}	—	September 22, 2014	Haleakala	Pan-STARRS 1	(5)	1.4 km	MPC · JPL
534882	2014 WH_{288}	—	October 2, 2014	Haleakala	Pan-STARRS 1	·	1.4 km	MPC · JPL
534883	2014 WD_{289}	—	September 30, 2005	Mount Lemmon	Mount Lemmon Survey	·	1.1 km	MPC · JPL
534884	2014 WL_{289}	—	September 29, 1973	Palomar	C. J. van Houten, I. van Houten-Groeneveld, T. Gehrels	·	1.0 km	MPC · JPL
534885	2014 WR_{292}	—	January 17, 2007	Catalina	CSS	·	1.4 km	MPC · JPL
534886	2014 WH_{293}	—	December 21, 2006	Kitt Peak	Spacewatch	·	1.1 km	MPC · JPL
534887	2014 WK_{293}	—	September 23, 2005	Kitt Peak	Spacewatch	EUN	930 m	MPC · JPL
534888	2014 WA_{298}	—	May 10, 2013	Kitt Peak	Spacewatch	·	1.4 km	MPC · JPL
534889	2014 WB_{299}	—	September 18, 2014	Haleakala	Pan-STARRS 1	EUN	980 m	MPC · JPL
534890	2014 WZ_{299}	—	March 16, 2012	Mount Lemmon	Mount Lemmon Survey	·	1.6 km	MPC · JPL
534891	2014 WA_{300}	—	October 28, 2014	Haleakala	Pan-STARRS 1	·	2.2 km	MPC · JPL
534892	2014 WX_{300}	—	October 28, 2014	Haleakala	Pan-STARRS 1	·	650 m	MPC · JPL
534893	2014 WA_{305}	—	October 27, 2003	Kitt Peak	Spacewatch	·	990 m	MPC · JPL
534894	2014 WH_{305}	—	October 30, 2014	Mount Lemmon	Mount Lemmon Survey	·	1.2 km	MPC · JPL
534895	2014 WS_{305}	—	April 21, 2013	Haleakala	Pan-STARRS 1	HNS	1.4 km	MPC · JPL
534896	2014 WF_{306}	—	July 27, 2005	Siding Spring	SSS	(1547)	1.4 km	MPC · JPL
534897	2014 WB_{308}	—	February 25, 2007	Mount Lemmon	Mount Lemmon Survey	PAD	1.6 km	MPC · JPL
534898	2014 WC_{309}	—	January 26, 2011	Mount Lemmon	Mount Lemmon Survey	·	1.2 km	MPC · JPL
534899	2014 WF_{311}	—	December 15, 2010	Mount Lemmon	Mount Lemmon Survey	·	700 m	MPC · JPL
534900	2014 WN_{313}	—	February 21, 2007	Mount Lemmon	Mount Lemmon Survey	·	1.1 km	MPC · JPL

== 534901–535000 ==
back to top

Designation			Discovery			Properties		Ref
Permanent	Provisional	Named after	Date	Site	Discoverer(s)	Category	Diam.	Ref
534901	2014 WG_{315}	—	November 14, 2010	Catalina	CSS	EUN	970 m	MPC · JPL
534902	2014 WP_{320}	—	October 21, 2014	Kitt Peak	Spacewatch	HNS	1.2 km	MPC · JPL
534903	2014 WV_{325}	—	August 29, 2014	Haleakala	Pan-STARRS 1	·	1.1 km	MPC · JPL
534904	2014 WV_{332}	—	October 26, 2014	Haleakala	Pan-STARRS 1	EUN	1.0 km	MPC · JPL
534905	2014 WR_{335}	—	April 20, 2009	Kitt Peak	Spacewatch	·	1.2 km	MPC · JPL
534906	2014 WM_{340}	—	October 29, 2014	Haleakala	Pan-STARRS 1	KON	2.0 km	MPC · JPL
534907	2014 WS_{347}	—	September 24, 2014	Mount Lemmon	Mount Lemmon Survey	EUN	1.1 km	MPC · JPL
534908	2014 WJ_{350}	—	January 19, 2012	Kitt Peak	Spacewatch	·	1.3 km	MPC · JPL
534909	2014 WS_{352}	—	September 4, 2014	Haleakala	Pan-STARRS 1	·	1.9 km	MPC · JPL
534910	2014 WH_{355}	—	October 6, 2005	Mount Lemmon	Mount Lemmon Survey	·	2.4 km	MPC · JPL
534911	2014 WK_{355}	—	May 6, 2008	Mount Lemmon	Mount Lemmon Survey	·	1.8 km	MPC · JPL
534912	2014 WJ_{356}	—	November 30, 2011	Mount Lemmon	Mount Lemmon Survey	·	480 m	MPC · JPL
534913	2014 WW_{357}	—	October 24, 2014	Catalina	CSS	·	1.6 km	MPC · JPL
534914	2014 WH_{359}	—	January 17, 2007	Kitt Peak	Spacewatch	(5)	1.1 km	MPC · JPL
534915	2014 WO_{361}	—	October 2, 2014	Haleakala	Pan-STARRS 1	·	1.4 km	MPC · JPL
534916	2014 WY_{361}	—	December 21, 2006	Kitt Peak	Spacewatch	EUN	900 m	MPC · JPL
534917	2014 WV_{366}	—	March 15, 2007	Kitt Peak	Spacewatch	·	640 m	MPC · JPL
534918	2014 WW_{366}	—	March 2, 2011	La Sagra	OAM	·	1.5 km	MPC · JPL
534919	2014 WS_{371}	—	October 26, 2014	Mount Lemmon	Mount Lemmon Survey	ADE	1.6 km	MPC · JPL
534920	2014 WB_{373}	—	November 6, 2010	Mount Lemmon	Mount Lemmon Survey	·	1.7 km	MPC · JPL
534921	2014 WY_{373}	—	March 17, 2012	Mount Lemmon	Mount Lemmon Survey	·	1.1 km	MPC · JPL
534922	2014 WE_{374}	—	December 5, 2007	Kitt Peak	Spacewatch	·	810 m	MPC · JPL
534923	2014 WQ_{374}	—	January 19, 2004	Kitt Peak	Spacewatch	NYS	800 m	MPC · JPL
534924	2014 WY_{380}	—	March 29, 2012	Haleakala	Pan-STARRS 1	·	1.5 km	MPC · JPL
534925	2014 WB_{381}	—	October 8, 2010	Kitt Peak	Spacewatch	·	690 m	MPC · JPL
534926	2014 WD_{381}	—	February 23, 2007	Kitt Peak	Spacewatch	·	1.6 km	MPC · JPL
534927	2014 WG_{381}	—	September 21, 2009	Kitt Peak	Spacewatch	·	1.5 km	MPC · JPL
534928	2014 WV_{381}	—	December 14, 2001	Socorro	LINEAR	HNS	1.1 km	MPC · JPL
534929	2014 WW_{381}	—	November 22, 2014	Haleakala	Pan-STARRS 1	·	3.1 km	MPC · JPL
534930	2014 WC_{382}	—	October 27, 2003	Kitt Peak	Spacewatch	·	2.3 km	MPC · JPL
534931	2014 WA_{383}	—	October 16, 2007	Mount Lemmon	Mount Lemmon Survey	V	460 m	MPC · JPL
534932	2014 WO_{383}	—	September 18, 2014	Haleakala	Pan-STARRS 1	·	920 m	MPC · JPL
534933	2014 WT_{386}	—	November 27, 2006	Kitt Peak	Spacewatch	·	650 m	MPC · JPL
534934	2014 WE_{388}	—	November 28, 2010	Kitt Peak	Spacewatch	(194)	1.3 km	MPC · JPL
534935	2014 WS_{389}	—	May 15, 2004	Siding Spring	SSS	·	1.7 km	MPC · JPL
534936	2014 WK_{393}	—	October 2, 2014	Haleakala	Pan-STARRS 1	·	1.9 km	MPC · JPL
534937	2014 WN_{393}	—	December 5, 2005	Catalina	CSS	·	1.6 km	MPC · JPL
534938	2014 WG_{399}	—	November 17, 2014	Mount Lemmon	Mount Lemmon Survey	·	2.0 km	MPC · JPL
534939	2014 WN_{399}	—	October 6, 2008	Catalina	CSS	·	5.9 km	MPC · JPL
534940	2014 WP_{399}	—	November 25, 2014	Haleakala	Pan-STARRS 1	·	1.2 km	MPC · JPL
534941	2014 WX_{399}	—	October 27, 2014	Haleakala	Pan-STARRS 1	·	1.0 km	MPC · JPL
534942	2014 WA_{400}	—	March 16, 2010	Mount Lemmon	Mount Lemmon Survey	EOS	2.0 km	MPC · JPL
534943	2014 WC_{400}	—	March 20, 1998	Kitt Peak	Spacewatch	·	4.5 km	MPC · JPL
534944	2014 WX_{406}	—	October 2, 2010	Mount Lemmon	Mount Lemmon Survey	·	1.2 km	MPC · JPL
534945	2014 WH_{408}	—	November 20, 2001	Socorro	LINEAR	·	1.1 km	MPC · JPL
534946	2014 WC_{409}	—	November 18, 2014	Haleakala	Pan-STARRS 1	·	1.3 km	MPC · JPL
534947	2014 WV_{410}	—	February 10, 2011	Mount Lemmon	Mount Lemmon Survey	·	1.6 km	MPC · JPL
534948	2014 WU_{411}	—	November 9, 1999	Kitt Peak	Spacewatch	V	620 m	MPC · JPL
534949	2014 WC_{416}	—	November 16, 2010	Mount Lemmon	Mount Lemmon Survey	JUN	990 m	MPC · JPL
534950	2014 WF_{418}	—	September 16, 2009	Mount Lemmon	Mount Lemmon Survey	·	2.2 km	MPC · JPL
534951	2014 WB_{421}	—	October 28, 2005	Kitt Peak	Spacewatch	·	1.5 km	MPC · JPL
534952	2014 WR_{421}	—	February 5, 2011	Catalina	CSS	EUN	1.2 km	MPC · JPL
534953	2014 WH_{422}	—	December 21, 2006	Mount Lemmon	Mount Lemmon Survey	·	790 m	MPC · JPL
534954	2014 WJ_{423}	—	May 8, 2013	Haleakala	Pan-STARRS 1	·	1.2 km	MPC · JPL
534955	2014 WA_{424}	—	April 15, 2012	Haleakala	Pan-STARRS 1	·	1.2 km	MPC · JPL
534956	2014 WU_{424}	—	October 31, 2005	Catalina	CSS	·	1.5 km	MPC · JPL
534957	2014 WK_{427}	—	March 12, 2007	Kitt Peak	Spacewatch	·	1.1 km	MPC · JPL
534958	2014 WO_{427}	—	February 24, 2006	Kitt Peak	Spacewatch	·	2.0 km	MPC · JPL
534959	2014 WY_{427}	—	November 26, 2014	Haleakala	Pan-STARRS 1	(194)	1.4 km	MPC · JPL
534960	2014 WF_{428}	—	February 22, 2011	Kitt Peak	Spacewatch	·	980 m	MPC · JPL
534961	2014 WG_{428}	—	January 16, 2011	Mount Lemmon	Mount Lemmon Survey	·	1.2 km	MPC · JPL
534962	2014 WK_{428}	—	January 9, 2006	Kitt Peak	Spacewatch	HNS	1.3 km	MPC · JPL
534963	2014 WZ_{428}	—	November 26, 2005	Catalina	CSS	·	1.6 km	MPC · JPL
534964	2014 WK_{429}	—	April 24, 2011	Kitt Peak	Spacewatch	·	2.3 km	MPC · JPL
534965	2014 WY_{432}	—	September 17, 2010	Mount Lemmon	Mount Lemmon Survey	NYS	920 m	MPC · JPL
534966	2014 WX_{433}	—	August 22, 2003	Palomar	NEAT	·	980 m	MPC · JPL
534967	2014 WF_{434}	—	September 28, 2003	Anderson Mesa	LONEOS	·	860 m	MPC · JPL
534968	2014 WV_{436}	—	November 30, 2010	Mount Lemmon	Mount Lemmon Survey	(5)	1 km	MPC · JPL
534969	2014 WT_{437}	—	July 13, 2013	Mount Lemmon	Mount Lemmon Survey	·	1.5 km	MPC · JPL
534970	2014 WT_{441}	—	November 20, 2014	Mount Lemmon	Mount Lemmon Survey	MAR	1.1 km	MPC · JPL
534971	2014 WA_{446}	—	September 2, 2010	Mount Lemmon	Mount Lemmon Survey	·	1.1 km	MPC · JPL
534972	2014 WM_{449}	—	October 15, 2009	Catalina	CSS	·	2.1 km	MPC · JPL
534973	2014 WX_{451}	—	September 19, 2009	Mount Lemmon	Mount Lemmon Survey	WIT	840 m	MPC · JPL
534974	2014 WJ_{453}	—	February 23, 2011	Catalina	CSS	(5)	890 m	MPC · JPL
534975	2014 WH_{457}	—	March 15, 2012	Mount Lemmon	Mount Lemmon Survey	·	780 m	MPC · JPL
534976	2014 WC_{459}	—	December 11, 2010	Kitt Peak	Spacewatch	·	1.4 km	MPC · JPL
534977	2014 WM_{460}	—	November 4, 2014	Mount Lemmon	Mount Lemmon Survey	L5	10 km	MPC · JPL
534978	2014 WO_{460}	—	March 10, 2008	Mount Lemmon	Mount Lemmon Survey	NYS	800 m	MPC · JPL
534979	2014 WC_{466}	—	January 13, 2011	Mount Lemmon	Mount Lemmon Survey	·	980 m	MPC · JPL
534980	2014 WB_{467}	—	August 31, 2005	Anderson Mesa	LONEOS	·	1.2 km	MPC · JPL
534981	2014 WG_{467}	—	November 21, 2008	Kitt Peak	Spacewatch	·	3.0 km	MPC · JPL
534982	2014 WV_{467}	—	March 1, 2011	La Sagra	OAM	·	1.3 km	MPC · JPL
534983	2014 WW_{467}	—	November 24, 2003	Kitt Peak	Spacewatch	EOS	2.0 km	MPC · JPL
534984	2014 WD_{468}	—	December 20, 2004	Mount Lemmon	Mount Lemmon Survey	·	930 m	MPC · JPL
534985	2014 WG_{468}	—	October 28, 1995	Kitt Peak	Spacewatch	·	1.7 km	MPC · JPL
534986	2014 WQ_{468}	—	November 7, 2008	Mount Lemmon	Mount Lemmon Survey	·	2.6 km	MPC · JPL
534987	2014 WC_{469}	—	September 29, 2009	Mount Lemmon	Mount Lemmon Survey	·	1.5 km	MPC · JPL
534988	2014 WF_{469}	—	December 30, 2000	Socorro	LINEAR	·	2.0 km	MPC · JPL
534989	2014 WY_{469}	—	November 27, 2014	Mount Lemmon	Mount Lemmon Survey	·	1.1 km	MPC · JPL
534990	2014 WW_{477}	—	October 25, 2005	Kitt Peak	Spacewatch	(1547)	1.6 km	MPC · JPL
534991	2014 WZ_{477}	—	November 18, 2009	Kitt Peak	Spacewatch	EUN	1.5 km	MPC · JPL
534992	2014 WN_{478}	—	November 4, 2002	Kitt Peak	Spacewatch	EOS	2.4 km	MPC · JPL
534993	2014 WB_{479}	—	September 23, 2008	Kitt Peak	Spacewatch	·	1.8 km	MPC · JPL
534994	2014 WE_{479}	—	December 2, 2008	Catalina	CSS	·	3.3 km	MPC · JPL
534995	2014 WF_{479}	—	November 28, 2014	Haleakala	Pan-STARRS 1	·	1.0 km	MPC · JPL
534996	2014 WG_{479}	—	August 18, 2006	Palomar	NEAT	V	710 m	MPC · JPL
534997	2014 WP_{479}	—	February 17, 2010	Kitt Peak	Spacewatch	EOS	2.1 km	MPC · JPL
534998	2014 WD_{480}	—	October 10, 2005	Siding Spring	SSS	·	1.9 km	MPC · JPL
534999	2014 WE_{480}	—	November 28, 2014	Haleakala	Pan-STARRS 1	(18466)	2.0 km	MPC · JPL
535000	2014 WX_{480}	—	August 15, 2013	Haleakala	Pan-STARRS 1	EUN	950 m	MPC · JPL

back to top

== Meaning of names ==
As minor planet discoveries are confirmed, they are given a permanent number by the IAU's Minor Planet Center (MPC), and the discoverers can then submit names for them, following the IAU's naming conventions. The list below concerns those minor planets in the specified number-range that have received names, and explains the meanings of those names.

Official naming citations of newly named small Solar System bodies are approved and published in a bulletin by IAU's Working Group for Small Bodies Nomenclature (WGSBN). Before May 2021, citations were published in MPC's Minor Planet Circulars for many decades. Recent citations can also be found on the JPL Small-Body Database (SBDB). Until his death in 2016, German astronomer Lutz D. Schmadel compiled these citations into the Dictionary of Minor Planet Names (DMP) and regularly updated the collection.

Based on Paul Herget's The Names of the Minor Planets, Schmadel also researched the unclear origin of numerous asteroids, most of which had been named prior to World War II. This article incorporates text from this source, which is in the public domain: SBDB New namings may only be added to this list below after official publication as the preannouncement of names is condemned. The WGSBN publishes a comprehensive guideline for the naming rules of non-cometary small Solar System bodies.

Named minor planet	Provisional	This minor planet was named for...	Ref · Catalog
534299 Parazynski	2014 SP_{311}	Scott E. Parazynski (born 1961) served in the NASA astronaut corps from 1992 to 2009, completing five space shuttle missions and seven spacewalks. A physician and prolific inventor, he has explored space and extreme environments on Earth from the depths of the ocean, to "level zero" of an active volcano, to the summit of Mt. Everest.	IAU · 534299
534390 Huningsheng	2014 TR_{65}	Hu Ningsheng (b. 1932) is an expert in astronomical instrumentation. He has contributed to China's development and manufacture of the photoelectric astrolabe.	IAU · 534390
