= 2744 Birgitta =

Mars-crossing asteroid

Discovery
- Discovered by: C.-I. Lagerkvist
- Discovery site: Kvistaberg Stn.
- Discovery date: 4 September 1975

Designations
- Named after: Anna Birgitta Angelica Lagerkvist (discoverer's daughter)
- Alternative designations: 1975 RB · 1933 QY
- Minor planet category: Mars-crosser

Orbital characteristics
- Epoch 23 March 2018 (JD 2458200.5)
- Uncertainty parameter 0
- Observation arc: 84.41 yr (30,830 d)
- Aphelion: 3.0670 AU
- Perihelion: 1.5364 AU
- Semi-major axis: 2.3017 AU
- Eccentricity: 0.3325
- Orbital period (sidereal): 3.49 yr (1,275 d)
- Mean anomaly: 58.730°
- Mean motion: 0° 16^{m} 55.92^{s} / day
- Inclination: 6.7428°
- Longitude of ascending node: 315.55°
- Argument of perihelion: 44.106°

Physical characteristics
- Mean diameter: 2.67±0.27 km 3.29 km (calculated)
- Synodic rotation period: 8.97±0.08 h 8.994±0.005 h (Note: Skiff (2011) web: rotation period 8.994±0.005 hours with a brightness amplitude of 0.18±0.02 mag. Quality code of 3. Observations from 10 October 2010. Summary figures for (2744) Birgitta at the LCDB); 9.02 h
- Geometric albedo: 0.20 (assumed); 0.304±0.061
- Spectral type: Tholen = S SMASS = S B–V = 0.909; U–B = 0.527
- Absolute magnitude (H): 14.78; 14.84±0.12 (R); 15.12±0.39

2744 Birgitta, provisional designation 1975 RB, is a stony asteroid and a Mars-crosser on an eccentric orbit from the innermost regions of the asteroid belt, approximately 3 kilometers (2 miles) in diameter. It was discovered at the Kvistaberg Station of the Uppsala Observatory in Sweden on 4 September 1975, by Swedish astronomer Claes-Ingvar Lagerkvist, who named it after his daughter, Anna Birgitta Angelica Lagerkvist. The S-type asteroid has a rotation period of 9.0 hours.

== Orbit and classification ==
Birgitta is a Mars-crossing asteroid, a dynamically unstable group between the main belt and the near-Earth populations, crossing the orbit of Mars. There are more than 5,000 numbered Mars-crosser – or approximately 1% of the overall population of small Solar System bodies – with a perihelion between 1.3 and 1.666 AU.

Birgitta orbits the Sun at a distance of 1.5–3.1 AU once every 3 years and 6 months (1,275 days; semi-major axis of 2.3 AU). Its orbit has an eccentricity of 0.33 and an inclination of 7° with respect to the ecliptic. The asteroid was first observed as 1933 QY at the Heidelberg Observatory in August 1933. The body's observation arc begins with its official discovery observation at Kvistaberg in 1975.

== Physical characteristics ==
Birgitta is a common, stony S-type asteroid in both the Tholen and SMASS classification.

=== Rotation period ===
In October 2010, a rotational lightcurve of Birgitta was obtained from photometric observations by American astronomer Brian Skiff. Lightcurve analysis gave a well-defined rotation period of 8.994 hours with a brightness amplitude of 0.18 magnitude (U=3). The result supersedes a previous observation by the discoverer Claes-Ingvar Lagerkvist from the 1970s, which showed a period of 9.02 hours and an amplitude of 0.4 magnitude (U=2). In December 2014, astronomers at the Palomar Transient Factory in California measured as similar period of 8.97 hours with a brightness variation of 0.32 magnitude (U=2).

=== Diameter and albedo ===
According to the survey carried out by the NEOWISE mission of NASA's Wide-field Infrared Survey Explorer, Birgitta measures 2.67 kilometers in diameter and its surface has a high albedo of 0.304, while the Collaborative Asteroid Lightcurve Link assumes a standard albedo for stony asteroids of 0.20 and calculates a diameter of 3.29 kilometers based on an absolute magnitude of 14.78.

Birgitta is a mid-sized Mars-crossing asteroid, smaller than 1065 Amundsenia (10 km), 1139 Atami (9 km), 1474 Beira (15 km), 1508 Kemi (17 km), 1011 Laodamia (7.5 km), 1727 Mette (9 km), 1131 Porzia (7 km), 1235 Schorria (5.5 km), 985 Rosina (8 km), 1310 Villigera (14 km) and 1468 Zomba (7 km), and significantly smaller than the largest members of this dynamical group, namely, 132 Aethra (40 km), 2204 Lyyli (25 km) and 512 Taurinensis (20 km).

== Naming ==
This minor planet was named after Anna Birgitta Angelica Lagerkvist, daughter of the discoverer Claes-Ingvar Lagerkvist. The official naming citation was published by the Minor Planet Center on 15 May 1984 (M.P.C. 8800).
