= 7548 Engström =

Main-belt asteroid

Discovery
- Discovered by: C.-I. Lagerkvist
- Discovery site: La Silla Obs.
- Discovery date: 16 March 1980

Designations
- Named after: Albert Engström (Swedish artist)
- Alternative designations: 1980 FW_{2} · 1993 QA_{4} 1999 TS_{324}
- Minor planet category: main-belt · Themis

Orbital characteristics
- Epoch 4 September 2017 (JD 2458000.5)
- Uncertainty parameter 0
- Observation arc: 36.88 yr (13,470 days)
- Aphelion: 3.6490 AU
- Perihelion: 2.6410 AU
- Semi-major axis: 3.1450 AU
- Eccentricity: 0.1603
- Orbital period (sidereal): 5.58 yr (2,037 days)
- Mean anomaly: 151.48°
- Mean motion: 0° 10^{m} 36.12^{s} / day
- Inclination: 0.3170°
- Longitude of ascending node: 346.66°
- Argument of perihelion: 296.30°

Physical characteristics
- Dimensions: 7.70 km (calculated); 9.43±3.04 km 11.067±0.129 km
- Synodic rotation period: 5.2309±0.0059 h
- Geometric albedo: 0.057±0.009; 0.06±0.05; 0.08 (assumed)
- Spectral type: C
- Absolute magnitude (H): 13.5 · 13.93 · 13.477±0.005 (R) · 13.64±0.21 · 13.75

7548 Engström, provisional designation 1980 FW_{2}, is dark Themistian asteroid from the outer region of the asteroid belt, approximately 9 kilometers in diameter. It was discovered on 16 March 1980, by Swedish astronomer Claes-Ingvar Lagerkvist at ESO's La Silla Observatory site in northern Chile. The asteroid was later named after Swedish artist Albert Engström.

== Classification and orbit ==
Engström is a member of the Themis family, a dynamical family of outer-belt asteroids with nearly coplanar ecliptical orbits. It orbits the Sun at a distance of 2.6–3.6 AU once every 5 years and 7 months (2,037 days). Its orbit has an eccentricity of 0.16 and an inclination of 0° with respect to the ecliptic.

The asteroid's observation arc begins with its official discovery observation at La Silla.

== Physical characteristics ==
Engström is an assumed carbonaceous C-type asteroid.

=== Rotation period ===
In September 2010, photometric observations by astronomers at the Palomar Transient Factory in California gave a rotational lightcurve with a period of 5.2309 hours and a brightness amplitude of 0.35 magnitude (U=2).

=== Diameter and albedo ===
According to the survey carried out by the NEOWISE mission of NASA's Wide-field Infrared Survey Explorer, Engström measures 9.43 and 11.1 kilometers in diameter and its surface has a low albedo of 0.057 and 0.060, respectively, while the Collaborative Asteroid Lightcurve Link (CALL) assumes an albedo of 0.08 and calculates a smaller diameter of 7.7 kilometers, based on an absolute magnitude of 13.93.

== Naming ==
This minor planet was named after Albert Engström (1869–1940), Swedish artist and author, who became a member of the esteemed Swedish academy in 1922. He was born in Lönneberga, Småland. After his studies of Greek and Latin at Uppsala University, he went on to Valand School of Fine Arts in Gothenburg. Renowned painter of caricatures and founder of the humor magazine Strix, he is best known for his black and white illustrations. The official naming citation was published on 11 April 1998 (M.P.C. 31611).
