= Claes-Ingvar Lagerkvist =

Swedish astronomer (born 1944)

Minor planets discovered: 145
see § List of discovered minor planets

Claes-Ingvar Lagerkvist (born 1944) is a Swedish astronomer at the Uppsala Astronomical Observatory. He is known for his work on the shapes and spin properties of minor planets.

He has discovered three comets, P/1996 R2, C/1996 R3 and 308P/Lagerkvist–Carsenty.

He has also discovered a number of asteroids, including the Trojan asteroid (37732) 1996 TY_{68}. Asteroid 2875 Lagerkvist, discovered February 11, 1983 by Edward L. G. Bowell of the Lowell Observatory Near-Earth-Object Search (LONEOS), was named in his honour.

== List of discovered minor planets ==
2114 Wallenquist	April 19, 1976
2191 Uppsala	August 6, 1977
2274 Ehrsson	March 2, 1976
2589 Daniel	August 22, 1979
2694 Pino Torinese	August 22, 1979
2744 Birgitta	September 4, 1975
2902 Westerlund	March 16, 1980
3005 Pervictoralex	August 22, 1979
3250 Martebo	March 6, 1979
3331 Kvistaberg	August 22, 1979
3573 Holmberg	August 16, 1982
3634 Iwan	March 16, 1980
4050 Mebailey^{[1]}	September 20, 1976
4169 Celsius	March 16, 1980
4254 Kamél	October 24, 1985
4310 Strömholm	September 2, 1978
4593 Reipurth	March 16, 1980
4985 Fitzsimmons	August 23, 1979
5080 Oja	March 2, 1976
5088 Tancredi	August 22, 1979
5498 Gustafsson	March 16, 1980
5934 Mats^{[1]}	September 20, 1976
5937 Lodén	December 11, 1979
5938 Keller	March 16, 1980
6150 Neukum	March 16, 1980
6686 Hernius	August 22, 1979
6687 Lahulla	March 16, 1980
6771 Foerster	March 9, 1986
6945 Dahlgren	March 16, 1980
7047 Lundström	September 2, 1978
7078 Unojönsson	October 17, 1985
7217 Dacke	August 22, 1979
7360 Moberg	January 30, 1996
7545 Smaklösa	July 28, 1978
7548 Engström	March 16, 1980
7813 Anderserikson	October 16, 1985
7857 Lagerros	August 22, 1978
7983 Festin	March 16, 1980
8534 Knutsson	March 17, 1993
8535 Pellesvanslös	March 21, 1993
8536 Måns	March 21, 1993
8537 Billochbull	March 21, 1993
8538 Gammelmaja	March 21, 1993
8539 Laban	March 19, 1993
8616 Fogelquist	March 16, 1980
8786 Belskaya	September 2, 1978
8793 Thomasmüller	August 22, 1979
9265 Ekman	September 2, 1978
9266 Holger	September 2, 1978
9267 Lokrume	September 2, 1978

9273 Schloerb	August 22, 1979
9274 Amylovell	March 16, 1980
9275 Persson	March 16, 1980
9521 Martinhoffmann	March 16, 1980
9720 Ulfbirgitta	March 16, 1980
9831 Simongreen	August 22, 1979
9919 Undset	August 22, 1979
10013 Stenholm	September 2, 1978
10021 Henja	August 22, 1979
10025 Rauer	March 16, 1980
10265 Gunnarsson	September 2, 1978
10270 Skoglöv	March 16, 1980
10285 Renémichelsen	August 17, 1982
10455 Donnison	July 9, 1978
10458 Sfranke	September 2, 1978
10997 Gahm	September 2, 1978
11004 Stenmark	March 16, 1980
11013 Kullander	August 16, 1982
11256 Fuglesang	September 2, 1978
11449 Stephwerner	August 22, 1979
11450 Shearer	August 22, 1979
11451 Aarongolden	August 22, 1979
11795 Fredrikbruhn	August 22, 1979
11797 Warell	March 16, 1980
11798 Davidsson	March 16, 1980
12197 Jan-Otto	March 16, 1980
12229 Paulsson	October 17, 1985
12663 Björkegren	September 2, 1978
12671 Thörnqvist	March 16, 1980
12672 Nygårdh	March 16, 1980
12673 Kiselman	March 16, 1980
12984 Lowry	August 22, 1979
13908 Wölbern	September 2, 1978
13911 Stempels	August 22, 1979
13912 Gammelgarn	August 22, 1979
14327 Lemke	March 16, 1980
14348 Cumming	October 20, 1985
15674 Elfving	September 2, 1978
16367 Astronomiasvecia	March 16, 1980
16707 Norman	August 19, 1995
17368 Korn	August 22, 1979
17369 Eremeeva	August 22, 1979
18302 Körner	March 16, 1980
18632 Danielsson	February 28, 1998
19084 Eilestam	September 2, 1978
19918 Stavby	August 6, 1977
(19925) 1979 QD_{3}	August 22, 1979
19927 Rogefeldt	March 16, 1980
(19959) 1985 UJ_{3}	October 17, 1985
20426 Fridlund	November 13, 1998

20427 Hjalmar	November 13, 1998
(22251) 1978 RT_{6}	September 2, 1978
(23418) 1979 QM_{3}	August 22, 1979
(23419) 1980 FQ_{1}	March 16, 1980
(24610) 1978 RA_{10}	September 2, 1978
(24624) 1980 FH_{4}	March 16, 1980
(26798) 1979 QG_{2}	August 22, 1979
(27672) 1980 FA_{1}	March 16, 1980
(29130) 1986 EA_{5}	March 9, 1986
(30723) 1978 RU_{8}	September 2, 1978
(30728) 1979 QD_{2}	August 22, 1979
(35008) 1980 FZ_{2}	March 16, 1980
(37534) 1980 FL_{4}	March 16, 1980
(37717) 1996 RQ_{33}	September 11, 1996
(37732) 1996 TY_{68}	October 10, 1996
(39465) 1978 RW_{6}	September 2, 1978
(39466) 1978 RX_{6}	September 2, 1978
(39467) 1978 RA_{7}	September 2, 1978
(39468) 1978 RY_{7}	September 2, 1978
(39469) 1978 RG_{9}	September 2, 1978
(39478) 1980 FR_{4}	March 16, 1980
(42464) 1978 RQ_{7}	September 2, 1978
(42468) 1979 QY_{2}	August 22, 1979
(43725) 1978 RK_{9}	September 2, 1978
(46524) 1979 QH_{2}	August 22, 1979
(52240) 1980 FQ_{4}	March 16, 1980
(58099) 1978 RB_{10}	September 2, 1978
(58108) 1979 QE_{1}	August 22, 1979
(73642) 1978 RV_{9}	September 2, 1978
(85135) 1979 QN_{1}	August 22, 1979
(85136) 1979 QX_{2}	August 22, 1979
(96303) 1996 UM_{5}	October 17, 1996
(99968) 1979 QQ_{2}	August 27, 1979
(100744) 1998 DU_{36}	February 28, 1998
(136779) 1996 TO_{68}	October 8, 1996
137052 Tjelvar	November 15, 1998
(150108) 1979 QG_{3}	August 22, 1979
(152556) 1980 FK_{4}	March 16, 1980
(175731) 1998 DW_{36}	February 28, 1998
(200145) 1998 DJ_{37}	February 28, 1998
(301842) 1980 FG_{4}	March 16, 1980
(312646) 2010 EY_{91}	August 19, 1995
(343842) 2011 HV_{33}	August 31, 1995
(353731) 2011 WR_{114}	August 29, 1995
(365893) 2011 WB_{3}	August 31, 1995
(368930) 2006 VS_{43}	August 8, 1995
1. ^{1} with H. Rickman
