= Quentin =

- Pronunciation: /ˈkwɛntn/ French: [kɑ̃tɛ̃]
- Gender: Male
- Language: French, English
- Name day: October 31

Origin
- Language: Latin
- Origin: Quintinus
- Derivation: quintus

Other names
- Variant forms: Quintin, Quinton, Quinten
- Short forms: Quent, Quin, Quinn, Quint
- Related names: see below

Quentin is a French masculine given name derived from the Latin first name Quintinus, a diminutive form of Quintus, which means "the fifth".

== People ==
- Saint Quentin (died c. 287)
- Quentin Anderson (1912–2003), American literary critic and cultural historian
- Quentin Bajac (born 1965), French curator and historian of photography
- Quentin Bataillon (born 1993), French politician
- Quentin Blake (born 1932), English illustrator, famous for his work in Roald Dahl books
- Quentin Bryce (born 1942), the 25th Governor-General of Australia
- Quentin N. Burdick (1908–1992), American lawyer and senator from North Dakota
- Quentin Chapman, American politician
- Quentin L. Cook, American religious leader
- Quentin Cooper (born 1961), English science journalist, and broadcaster
- Quentin Crisp (1908–1999), English author and social critic
- Quentin Davies, Baron Davies of Stamford (born 1944), British politician
- Quentin Dean (1944–2003), American actress
- Quentin Elias, French singer and gay pornographic actor
- Quentin Fillon Maillet (born 1992), French biathlete
- Quentin Fottrell, Irish columnist and author
- Quentin Fulks, American campaign manager
- Quentin Gause (born 1992), American football player
- Quentin Grimes (born 2000), American basketball player
- Quentin Halys (born 1996), French tennis player
- Quentin Hubbard (1954–1976), son of the founder of the Church of Scientology
- Quentin Hughes (cricketer) (born 1974), English cricketer
- Quentin Jackson (1909–1976), American jazz trombonist
- Quentin Jammer (born 1979), American National Football League football player
- Quentin Johnston (born 2001), American football player
- Quentin Kawānanakoa (born 1961), American politician
- Quentin Kenihan (1975–2018), Australian disability advocate, comedian and actor
- Quentin Keynes (1921–2003), British explorer and bibliophile
- Quentin Lafargue (born 1990), French racing cyclist
- Quentin Lake (born 1999), American football player
- Quentin Lee, Chinese-Canadian film director
- Quentin Oliver Lee (1988–2022), American actor
- Quentin Letts (born 1963), British journalist
- Quentin Matsys (1466–1529), Flemish painter
- Quentin McCord (1978–2020), American football player
- Quentin Metsys the Younger (c. 1543–1589), Flemish Renaissance painter; grandson of the above
- Quentin Meillassoux (born 1967), French philosopher
- Quentin Moses (born 1983), American football player
- Quentin Mosimann (born 1988), French-Swiss singer-DJ
- Quentin Neujahr (born 1971), American football player
- Quentin Poling (born 1994), American football player
- Quentin Pryor (born 1983), American basketball player
- Quentin Reynolds (1902–1965), American journalist and war correspondent
- Quentin Richardson (born 1980), American National Basketball Association player
- Quentin Riggins (born 1966), American player of gridiron football
- Quentin Roosevelt (1897–1918), son of US President Theodore Roosevelt
- Quentin Skinner (born 1940), English professor and historian
- Quentin Skinner (American football) (born 2001), American football player
- Quentin Smith, American philosopher
- Quentin Smythe (1916–1997), South African recipient of the Victoria Cross
- Quentin Stanerson (born 1977), American politician and teacher
- Quentin Tarantino (born 1963), American film director, screenwriter, producer, cinematographer and actor
- Quentin Westberg (born 1986), French-American footballer
- Quentin Williams (1983–2023), American politician
- Quentin Willson (1957–2025), British TV presenter and motoring journalist
- Quentin Young (1923–2016), American physician and social justice activist, primarily relating to healthcare

== Fictional characters ==
- Quentin Beck, a.k.a. Mysterio, a supervillain, enemy of Spider-Man
- Quentin "Q" Coldwater, the main character in Lev Grossman's book The Magicians and its TV adaptation
- Quentin Collins, a main character on the ABC soap opera Dark Shadows
- Quentin Compson, a main character in William Faulkner's The Sound and the Fury and Absalom, Absalom!; also the name of that character's niece
- Quentin Costa, on the television show Nip/Tuck
- Quentin Durgens, main character of Canadian TV show “Quentin Durgens, M.P.” 1965–1969
- the title character of the Sir Walter Scott novel Quentin Durward and the film adaptation
- Quentin Fleming, on the TV show American Horror Story: Coven
- Quentin Glass, in the film The Punisher
- Quentin "Q" Jacobsen, the protagonist of John Green's novel Paper Towns
- Quentin Kelly, on the sitcom Grace Under Fire
- Quentin Kirrin, from Enid Blyton's The Famous Five novel series
- Quentin Larry Lance, on the TV show Arrow
- Quentin Quire, Marvel Comics character
- Quentin Sainz, on the TV show Suits
- Quentin Seller, an antagonist in the 2022 film Vengeance
- Quentin Smith, in the 2010 film A Nightmare on Elm Street
- Quentin Travers, on the television program Buffy the Vampire Slayer
- Quentin, the seventeenth child in Edward Gorey's book The Gashlycrumb Tinies
- Quentin, a cog in the Conker video game series, also known as Carl

== See also ==
- Quentin (surname)
- Quenton (disambiguation)
- Quinten (disambiguation)
- Quinton (disambiguation)
- Quentyn Martell, in the A Song of Ice and Fire fantasy novel series
