= Saint-Quentin =

Saint-Quentin may refer to:

== Places ==
=== Canada ===
- Saint-Quentin, New Brunswick
- Saint-Quentin Parish, New Brunswick
- Saint-Quentin Island, in Trois-Rivières, in Québec

=== France ===
- Saint-Quentin, Aisne, in the Aisne department
- Saint-Quentin-en-Yvelines, a new town in the Yvelines department
- Saint-Quentin-au-Bosc, in the Seine-Maritime department
- Saint-Quentin-de-Baron, in the Gironde department
- Saint-Quentin-de-Blavou, in the Orne department
- Saint-Quentin-de-Caplong, in the Gironde department
- Saint-Quentin-de-Chalais, in the Charente department
- Saint-Quentin-des-Isles, in the Eure department
- Saint-Quentin-des-Prés, in the Oise department
- Saint-Quentin-du-Dropt, in the Lot-et-Garonne department
- Saint-Quentin-en-Mauges, in the Maine-et-Loire department
- Saint-Quentin-en-Tourmont, in the Somme department
- Saint-Quentin-Fallavier, in the Isère department
- Saint-Quentin-la-Chabanne, in the Creuse department
- Saint-Quentin-la-Motte-Croix-au-Bailly, in the Somme department
- Saint-Quentin-la-Poterie, in the Gard department
- Saint-Quentin-la-Tour, in the Ariège department
- Saint-Quentin-le-Petit, in the Ardennes department
- Saint-Quentin-les-Anges, in the Mayenne department
- Saint-Quentin-lès-Beaurepaire, in the Maine-et-Loire department
- Saint-Quentin-les-Chardonnets, in the Orne department
- Saint-Quentin-les-Marais, in the Marne department
- Saint-Quentin-le-Verger, in the Marne department
- Saint-Quentin-sur-Charente, in the Charente department
- Saint-Quentin-sur-Coole, in the Marne department
- Saint-Quentin-sur-Indrois, in the Indre-et-Loire department
- Saint-Quentin-sur-Isère, in the Isère department
- Saint-Quentin-sur-le-Homme, in the Manche department
- Saint-Quentin-sur-Nohain, in the Nièvre department
- Saint-Quentin-sur-Sauxillanges, in the Puy-de-Dôme department

== Other ==
- Basilica of Saint-Quentin, formerly the Collegiate Church of Saint-Quentin, a Catholic church in the town of Saint-Quentin, Aisne, France

== See also ==
- Saint Quentin (died 287), early Christian saint
- Battle of St. Quentin (disambiguation)
- San Quintin (disambiguation)
- San Quentin (disambiguation)
- Sant Quintí de Mediona, a place in Spain
