= Quentin (disambiguation) =

Quentin is a primarily male given name.

Quentin or Quentins may also refer to:

- Quentin (surname)
- HMS Quentin (G78), a Second World War destroyer
- Quentin, Pennsylvania, a census-designated place
- Quentins, a 2002 novel by Maeve Binchy

== See also ==
- San Quintin (disambiguation)
- Quintin, a commune in France
- Quinten (disambiguation)
- Quinton (disambiguation)
- Quenton (disambiguation)
