= Compson =

Compson is a surname. Notable people with the name include:

- Betty Compson (1897–1974), American actress
- Hartwell B. Compson (1842–1905), American military officer

Fictional characters

- Compson family, including Caddy Compson and Quentin Compson, in the works of William Faulkner
- Ladonna Compson in the television show Arthur.
- Compson, a character in the 2026 film Digger
