= Ikkemotubbe =

Fictional Indian chief in stories of William Faulkner

Ikkemotubbe is a fictional Chickasaw Indian chief living in Yoknapatawpha County, Mississippi. He appears in novels and short stories by William Faulkner, such as in the collection of stories titled III The Wilderness: "Red Leaves," "A Justice," and "A Courtship". He is referenced extensively in Faulkner's popular classic 'The Bear" as the original owner of the land that was sold to Carothers McCaslin, the first white landowner of the woods in which the story takes place. After a steamboat trip to New Orleans, his name is "Frenchified" to "L'Homme" or "De l'Homme" ('The Man'), which he himself later re-Anglicizes to "Doom".
