= Quenton =

Quenton is a given name. Notable people with the name include:

- Quenton Ashlyn (1858–1933), the pseudonym of society entertainer Frank Kennedy
- Quenton Cassidy (John L. Parker Jr.) (born 1947), American writer, author of Once A Runner'
- Quenton DeCosey (born 1994), American professional basketball player
- Antwone Quenton Fisher (born 1959), American director, screenwriter, author, film producer
- Quenton Leach (1972–2020), Australian rules footballer
- Quenton Meeks (born 1997), American football cornerback
- Quenton Nelson (born 1996), American football guard

== See also ==
- Cyclone Quenton (1983) in the 1983–84 Australian region cyclone season
- Cyclone Quenton (1993) in the 1993–94 Australian region cyclone season
- Quentin
- Quintain (disambiguation)
- Quinten (disambiguation)
- Quinton (disambiguation)
