= Kvint =

Kvint is a family name of:

- Vladimir Kvint, an economist and strategist

Квинт is also a Bulgarian given name.

== See also ==
- Quint (disambiguation)
- KVINT (short for: Kon’iaki, vina i napitki Tiraspol’ia), a wine- and brandy distillery based in Tiraspol
