= Evening Sun =

Evening Sun may refer to:

- a sunflower variety
- That Evening Sun, a novel
- That Evening Sun (film)
- The Evening Sun, the evening edition of The Baltimore Sun
- The Evening Sun, the evening edition of New York's The Sun launched in 1887
- Hanover Evening Sun, Hanover, Pennsylvania
