= Harold Quinton =

Business executive (c. 1899–1969)

- Born: c. 1899; Topeka, Kansas, U.S.
- Died: April 28, 1969; Santa Monica, California, U.S.
- Education: Northwestern University
- Occupation: Businessman
- Spouse: Grace Quinton
- Children: 1 daughter

Harold Quinton (c. 1899–1969) was an American business executive. He served as the president, chief executive officer, and chairman of Southern California Edison in the 1950s and 1960s. During his tenure, he oversaw the construction of the San Onofre Nuclear Generating Station in San Diego County, California, and he planned the construction of the Mohave Power Station in Laughlin, Nevada.

== Early life ==
Harold Quinton was born in Topeka, Kansas circa 1899. He became orphaned at 13.

Quinton graduated from Northwestern University. He served in the United States Cavalry during World War I.

== Career ==
Quinton first worked for the Atchison, Topeka and Santa Fe Railway at the age of 17. He subsequently worked for the United States Department of the Treasury, followed by a tax firm in San Francisco, California. He later served as the president of Buffum's, a department store based in Long Beach, California.

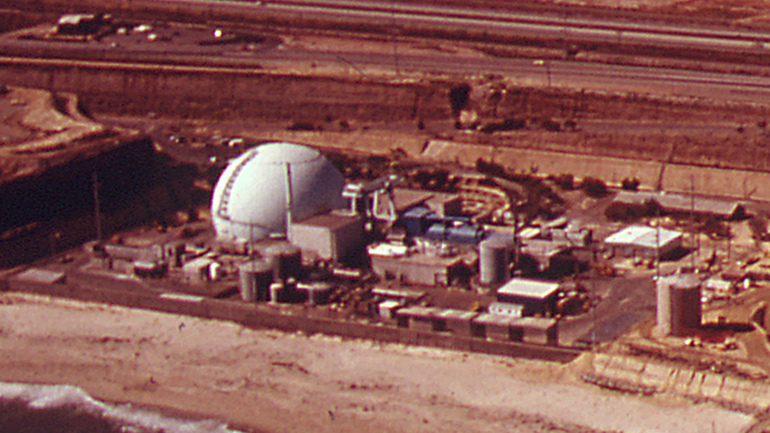
The San Onofre Nuclear Generating Station, built during Quinton's tenure as chairman of Southern California Edison.

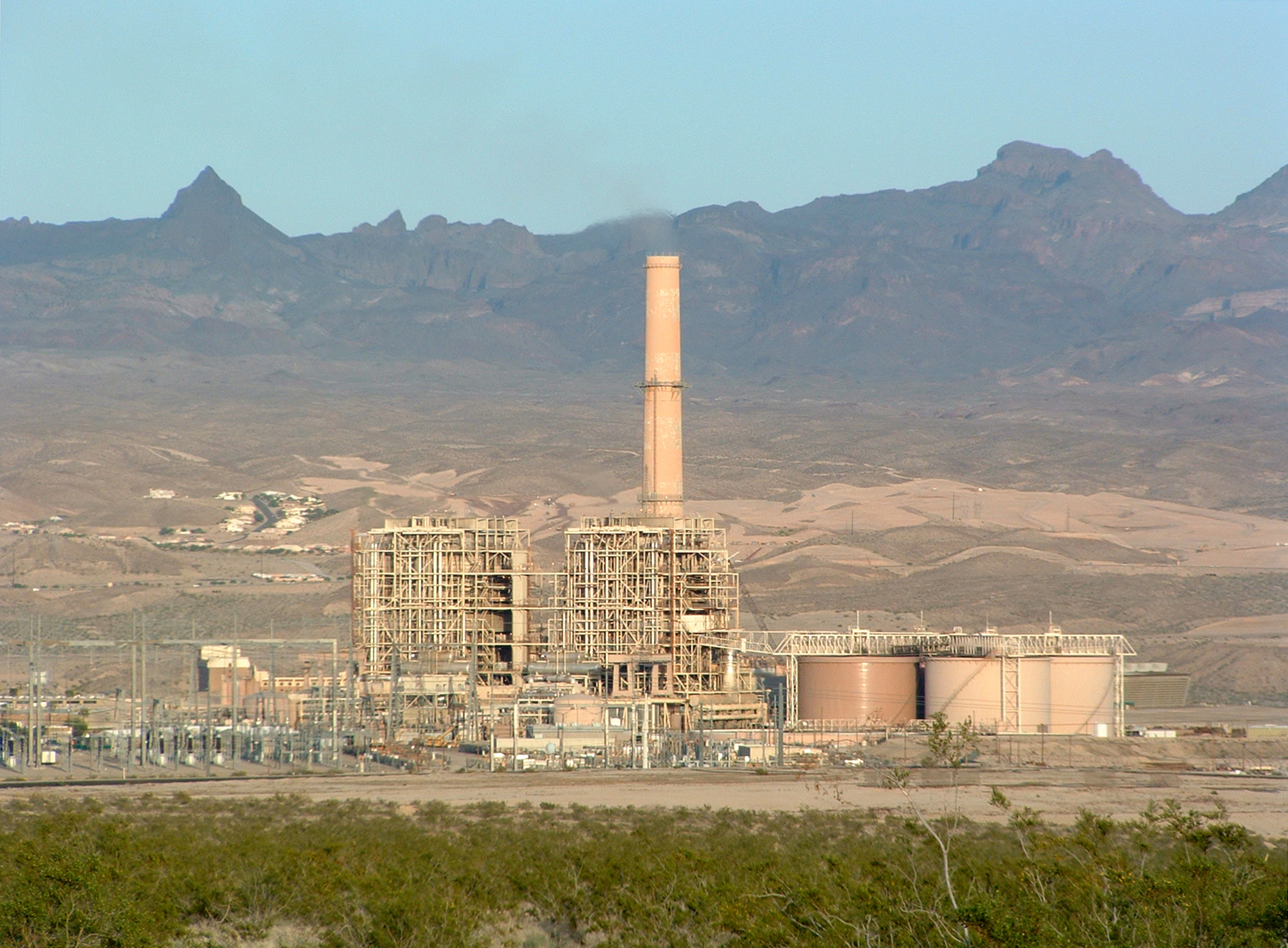
The Mohave Power Station, whose construction was agreed upon under Quinton's tenure as chairman of Southern California Edison.

Quinton joined Southern California Edison in 1942, eventually serving as its president and chief executive officer from 1954 to 1959. He served as its chairman from 1958 to 1968, when he was succeeded by Jack K. Horton. Quinton also served on its board of directors from 1956 to 1969. During his tenure as chairman, he oversaw the construction of the San Onofre Nuclear Generating Station in San Diego County, California. Meanwhile, in 1966, he signed a contract to build the Mohave Power Station in Laughlin, Nevada.

Quinton served as the president of the Edison Electric Institute. He also served on the boards of directors of the Kaiser Steel Corporation, the Pacific Mutual Life Insurance Company, and the First Western Bank and Trust Company. Additionally, he served on the board of directors of Calabasas Park, a real estate development company whose goal was to develop the former Warner Bros. ranch in Calabasas, California into a residential area.

Quinton served on the board of trustees of the University of Southern California. He gave speeches in favor of competition and free market capitalism as well as a reduction in government spending and taxation. He was named the California Industrialist of the Year by the California Museum of Science and Industry in 1967.

== Personal life, death, and legacy ==
Quinton had a wife, Grace, and a daughter, Mrs Charles Reed. He was active in the Boy Scouts of America. He resided in Santa Monica, California, where he died on April 28, 1969. He was 70 years old.

The Harold Quinton Chair in Business Policy and Professor of Management and Organization at the Marshall School of Business of the University of Southern California was named in his honor; it is held by Professor Paul S. Adler.
