= William C. Faulkner =

William C. Faulkner may refer to:

- William Clark Falkner (~1826–1889), American soldier, planter, and writer from Mississippi, United States
- William Cuthbert Faulkner (1897–1962), American writer, his great-grandson
