= San Quintin =

San Quintín or San Quintin may refer to:

== Chile ==
- San Quintín Glacier

== Mexico ==
- San Quintín, Baja California
  - San Quintín Volcanic Field

== Philippines ==
- San Quintin, Abra
- San Quintin, Pangasinan

== See also ==
- Saint Quentin
- San Quentin (disambiguation)
- Battle of St. Quentin (disambiguation)
- Quentin (disambiguation)
- The dictionary definition of armar la de san Quintín at Wiktionary
