= These 13 =

- First edition cover
- Author: William Faulkner
- Language: English
- Publisher: J. Cape & H. Smith
- Publication date: 1931
- LC Class: PS3511.A86 T48

These 13 is a 1931 collection of short stories written by William Faulkner, and dedicated to his first daughter, Alabama, who died nine days after her birth on January 11, 1931, and to his wife Estelle. No longer in print, These 13 is now a collector's item.

These 13, Faulkner's first release of short stories, contained the following stories:

- "Victory"
- "Ad Astra"
- "All the Dead Pilots"
- "Crevasse"
- "Red Leaves"
- "A Rose for Emily"
- "A Justice"
- "Hair"
- "That Evening Sun"
- "Dry September"
- "Mistral"
- "Divorce in Naples"
- "Carcassonne"
