= Quinton (name) =

Quinton is either a surname or a masculine given name.

The English surname and given name may refer to the place name Quinton, from Old English cwen "queen" or cwene "woman" and tun "farmstead, estate". The French surname Quinton [kɛ̃tɔ̃] is a common surname and a former given name. It is a variant form of Quenton [kɑ̃tɔ̃], itself from Quentin, Quintin with the usual replacement of the suffix -in (such as in the surnames Quintard, Quintier) by -on, commonly used in the French given names (e. g. Marion, Yvon) and surnames (e.g. Creton, Crinon, Bricon, etc.)

== Given name ==
=== Sports ===
- Quinton Andrews, American football player
- Quinton Bell, American football player
- Quinton Bohanna (born 1999), American football player
- Quinton Byfield (born 2002), Canadian ice hockey player
- Quinton Cooley (born 2001), American football player
- Quinton de Kock (born 1992), South African cricketer
- Quinton Boatswain, Montserratian cricketer
- Quinton Ferrell, American basketball coach
- Quinton Flowers (born 1994), American football player
- Quinton Fortune (born 1977), South African footballer
- Quinton Hooker (born 1995), American basketball player in the Israeli Basketball Premier League
- Quinton Jefferson (born 1993), American football player
- Quinton Knight, American football player
- Quinton Narkle, Australian rules footballer
- Quinton Newsome (born 2001), American football player
- Quinton "Rampage" Jackson, American mixed martial artist
- Quinton Patton (born 1990), American football player
- Quinton Rose (born 1998), American basketball player

=== Others ===
- Quinton Aaron (born 1984), American actor
- Quinton Flynn, American voice actor
- Quinton Hoover (1964–2013), American card game artist
- Quinton Kyle Hoover (born 1996), American YouTuber known as "Quinton Reviews"
- Quinton Lucas (born 1984), American politician

== Surname ==
- A. R. Quinton (1853–1934), English watercolour artist
- Amelia Stone Quinton (1833–1926), American social activist for Native American rights
- Anthony Quinton (1925–2010), British philosopher
- Brian Quinton, Australian rugby player
- Cornelia Bentley Sage Quinton (1876–1936), American painter
- Harold Quinton (c. 1899–1969), American business executive
- Herman William Quinton (1896–1952), Canadian politician from Newfoundland
- John Quinton (1921–1951), British RAF Navigator
- John Quinton (banker) (1929–2012), British banker
- René Quinton (1866–1925), French naturalist and aviation pioneer
- Sophie Quinton (born 1976), French actress
- Wally Quinton (1917–1996), English footballer

=== Disambiguation pages ===
- James Quinton (disambiguation)
