= William Clark Falkner =

American poet

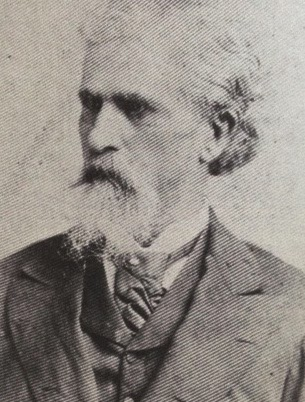
- William Clark Falkner

Member of the Mississippi House of Representatives from the 1st district
- In office 1889

Personal details
- Born: July 6, 1825 or July 6, 1826 Knox County, Tennessee, USA
- Died: November 6, 1889 (aged 63 or 64) Mississippi, USA
- Spouses: Holland Pearce (m. 1847; died 1849) Elizabeth Houston Vance (m. 1851)
- Children: 9
- Relatives: William Faulkner (great-grandson)
- Military career
- Allegiance: United States of America; Confederate States of America
- Branch: Army
- Rank: Colonel
- Units: 2nd Regiment of Mississippi Volunteers; Second Mississippi Infantry; 1st Mississippi Partisan Rangers
- Conflicts: Mexican–American War American Civil War: First Battle of Bull Run; Battle of Iuka

William Clark Falkner (July 6, 1825 or 1826 – November 6, 1889) was a military veteran, businessman, author, and politician in northern Mississippi. He is most notable for the influence he had on the work of his great-grandson, author William Faulkner.

== Family background ==
He was born in Knox County, Tennessee, to Joseph Falkner (or Forkner or Faulkner) and Caroline Word (or Ward). Both Caroline's paternal grandfather Charles and his brother Cuthbert died during the American Revolutionary War while serving under the command of George Washington. Her father, Thomas Adams Word, moved the family to Georgia in 1812. Caroline's sister, Justianna Dickinson Word, married John Wesley Thompson, who in 1834 was arrested for killing a man during a fight. He was acquitted, and afterwards he moved with Justianna to Ripley, Mississippi. Thompson eventually became a district attorney and later a district judge in Mississippi.

William Clark Falkner lived with his family in Ste. Genevieve, Missouri and Pontotoc, Mississippi, joining the Thompsons in Ripley in 1842. In 1847, he married Holland Pearce. Their only child John Wesley Thompson Falkner, named after WC's uncle, was born in 1848. Holland died in 1849. Elizabeth Houston Vance (1833–1910) became his second wife in 1851. They were the parents of eight children:

- William Henry Falkner (1853–1878) - son
- Willett Medora Falkner Carter (1856–1918) - daughter
- Thomas Vance Falkner (1859–1861) - son
- Lizzie Manassah Falkner (1861–1861) - daughter
- Fannie Forest Falkner Dogan (1866–1929) - daughter
- Effie Falkner Davis (1868–1957) - daughter
- Alabama Leroy Falkner McLean (1874–1968) - daughter
- Unknown (died young)

== Military service ==
He served in the Mexican–American War as First Lieutenant of the 2nd Regiment of Mississippi Volunteers. Per Richard Bruce Winders' history of the Mississippi Rifles:

William C. Faulkner...had gone riding outside the city limits when he was fired on from ambush. The first lieutenant of the Tippah Guards, Faulkner was struck twice by the shots with one ball entering his left foot and another carrying away the ends of three fingers from his left hand. Although not life- threatening, the painful wounds prevented Faulkner from effectively performing his duties, and the lieutenant asked for a medical discharge. Afterward, it was claimed by a fellow officer, 2nd Lt. Thomas C. Hindman, Faulkner had been shot while visiting Aguas Calientes, a popular village nearby that had been placed off limits by General Taylor. According to Hindman, the assailants were not guerrillas but instead Faulkner's rival for the hand of a local señorita. The feud between the two officers continued after they both returned home, culminating when Faulkner killed Hindman’s brother Robert with a bowie knife on the streets of Ripley, Mississippi. Like Faulkner and his brother, Thomas, Robert had been a member of the Tippah Guards although only a private.

— Panting For Glory: The Mississippi Rifles in the Mexican War (2016)

When the American Civil War broke out, he traveled to Arkansas to recruit his brother in law Lazurus Pearce to join a company of men he raised, and was made colonel in the Second Mississippi Infantry of the Confederate Army. He led the regiment at the First Battle of Bull Run. Later, he was demoted in an election of officers, so he returned to Mississippi in the summer of 1862 and formed a unit known as the 1st Mississippi Partisan Rangers. Falkner's new regiment suffered major losses during raids by Federal cavalry in November 1862 and April 1863. Frustrated in his ambitions to gain a promotion to brigadier general, Falkner resigned his officer's commission in October 1863. He never regained a prominent role in the Confederate Army, but he was forever known as "Colonel Falkner" or just "The Old Colonel" after the war.

== Later life and death ==
During Reconstruction, he was active in rebuilding northern Mississippi and founded the Ship Island, Ripley, and Kentucky Railroad Company. The first station on the line north of Ripley was located in what is now the community of Falkner.

On November 5, 1889, he was shot by Richard Jackson Thurmond, a former business partner. The motive for the shooting was believed to have been a lingering grudge dating back to their partnership. Falkner had just been elected to serve in the Mississippi legislature. He died the next day.

== Literary works ==
Falkner was also an author, writing novels, poems, a travelogue, and at least one play. His most famous work was a novel entitled The White Rose of Memphis (New York, G. W. Carleton & co.; 1881), a murder mystery set on board a steamboat of the same name. This work was popular enough to be reprinted several times through the early 20th century, selling over 160,000 copies.

Partial source: Mississippi Writers and Musicians

- The Life and Confession of A. J. MacCannon, Murderer of the Adcock Family (1845)
- Faulkner, William (1851). The Siege of Monterey: a Poem. New American Library. ISBN 9780452006461. OCLC 18810792.
- Falkner, William C. (1851). The Spanish Heroine: A Tale Of War And Love. Kessinger. ISBN 978-1-167-19015-5. OCLC 4405424.
- The Lost Diamond (1867)
- Falkner, William C. (1881). The White Rose of Memphis. CreateSpace Independent Publishing Platform. ISBN 978-1-5309-4539-9. OCLC 1086801486.
- Falkner, William Clark (1882). The Little Brick Church. Literature House. ISBN 978-0839805502. OCLC 221914635.
- Falkner, William C. (1882). Rapid Ramblings in Europe. FB&C Limited. ISBN 978-1330930946. OCLC 945914487.
- Faulkner, William (1895). Lady Olivia, a novel. New American Library. ISBN 9780452006461. OCLC 38617650.

== Influence ==
WC Falkner's oldest child John Wesley Thompson Falkner was the father of Murry Cuthbert Falkner. Murry's oldest child was Nobel Laureate author William Faulkner. As a child, William (who later changed his surname to Faulkner) reportedly said, "I want to be a writer like my great-granddaddy." The elder Falkner served as the model for the character of Colonel John Sartoris, who appeared in the novels Sartoris (1929; reissued in an expanded edition as Flags in the Dust, 1973) and The Unvanquished (1938), as well as a number of short stories. Thus, Colonel Falkner is the inspiration for an integral part of the history of Faulkner's fictional Yoknapatawpha County. Faulkner's short story "Knight's Gambit" (in the 1949 collection Knight's Gambit) has been viewed as including a commentary on Falkner's The White Rose of Memphis (1881).

== Bibliography ==
- Gresset, Michel; Scharff, Arthur B. (1985). A Faulkner Chronology. Jackson, MS: University Press of Mississippi. ISBN 0-87805-229-1.
- Hamblin, Robert W.; Peek, Charles A. (1999). A William Faulkner Encyclopedia. Westport, CT: Greenwood Press. ISBN 0-313-29851-3.
- Williamson, Joel (1993). William Faulkner and Southern History. New York: Oxford University Press. ISBN 0-19-507404-1.
