= Quinton =

Quinton may also refer to:

== Places ==
=== United Kingdom ===
- Quinton, Birmingham, a western suburb and Birmingham City Council ward
- Quinton, Northamptonshire, a village and civil parish
- Quinton, Warwickshire, a civil parish containing Lower Quinton and Upper Quinton (formerly in Gloucestershire)

=== United States ===
- Quinton, Alabama
- Quinton Township, New Jersey
  - Quinton (CDP), New Jersey
- Quinton, Oklahoma
- Quinton, Virginia

=== Elsewhere ===
- Quinton, Saskatchewan, Canada
- Quinton Point, Anvers Island, Palmer Archipelago, Antarctica

== Other uses ==
- Quinton (name), surname and a masculine given name.
- Quinton (musical instrument), 18th-century bowed musical instrument
- Quinton Township School District, a public school district in Salem County, New Jersey, US
- Quinton House School, Upton, Northampton, England
- Quinton, a Modron character in Dungeons and Dragons

== See also ==
- Middle Quinton, a proposed eco-town in Warwickshire, England
- Quentin (disambiguation)
- Quintin, a commune in France
- Quenton (disambiguation)
- Quinten (disambiguation)
