= San Quentin (disambiguation) =

San Quentin most commonly refers to San Quentin State Prison, California.

San Quentin may also refer to:

- Saint Quentin (died c. 287), Christian saint
- San Quentin, California, a small unincorporated community adjacent to the prison
- San Quentin (1937 film), starring Humphrey Bogart
- San Quentin (1946 film), directed by Gordon Douglas
- "San Quentin" (song), by Nickelback, 2022
- "San Quentin", a song by Johnny Cash from his 1969 album At San Quentin
- Point San Quentin, a former geographic feature on the east side of San Francisco, California

== See also ==
- San Quintin (disambiguation)
