= 2nd Mississippi Infantry Regiment =

Infantry regiment of the Confederate States Army

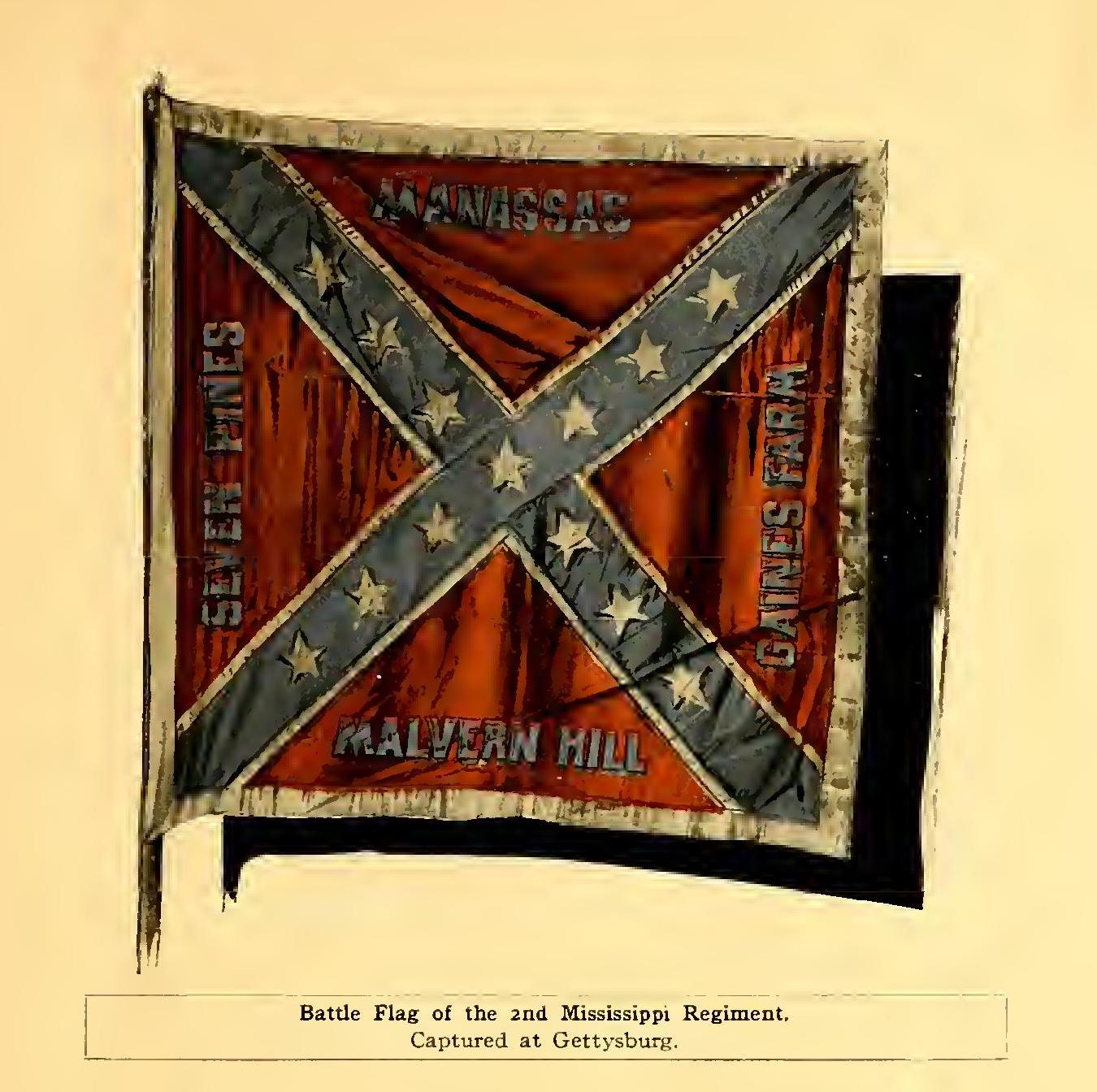
- Drawing of the 2nd Mississippi's battle flag, captured by Union troops at Gettysburg.
- Active: 1861–1865
- Country: Confederate States of America
- Allegiance: Mississippi
- Branch: Confederate States Army
- Type: Infantry
- Size: Regiment
- Engagements: American Civil War: First Battle of Bull Run; Seven Days Battles; Second Battle of Bull Run; Battle of Antietam; Battle of Gettysburg; Battle of the Wilderness; Battle of Spotsylvania Court House; Battle of Cold Harbor; Siege of Petersburg

Commanders
- Notable commanders: William Clark Falkner; John Marshall Stone

The 2nd Mississippi Infantry Regiment was a unit of the Confederate States Army during the American Civil War. The 2nd Regiment was composed of volunteer companies from North Mississippi which were sent to join the Confederate forces in Virginia in the spring of 1861. As part of the Army of Northern Virginia, the 2nd Regiment fought in many of the most decisive battles of the Eastern theater of the American Civil War, suffering heavy casualties at Antietam and Gettysburg.

== Formation and First Battle of Bull Run ==
The volunteer companies of the 2nd Mississippi were assembled at Corinth in early May 1861, initially for state service, and then travelled to Virginia, arriving at Lynchburg on May 9 and mustering into Confederate service on May 10. William Clark Falkner, great-grandfather of the novelist William Faulkner, was elected as Colonel. The original strength of the regiment was 784 officers and men. Company L, the Liberty Guards, was formed in March 1862 as a supplemental company and joined the regiment in Virginia in April of that year.

As part of General Barnard Bee's brigade, the 2nd Mississippi fought at the First Battle of Bull Run in July. During this battle, the first major action of the war, the 2nd Regiment acted in support of a cavalry charge made by General J.E.B. Stuart, who wrote: "Just after the cavalry charge our re-enforcements arrived upon the field and formed rapidly on right into line. The first was Colonel Falkner's regiment (Mississippians), whose gallantry came under my own observation". Brigade commander General Bee was mortally wounded during the battle, and afterwards the 2nd was moved under General William H.C. Whiting's command.

== 1862 ==
After spending the winter in camp, in April 1862 the 2nd Mississippi was moved to Yorktown, Virginia, and reorganized, as the Regiment's initial one-year term of service had expired. The Regiment reenlisted for the remainder of the war and new officers were elected: John Marshall Stone was chosen as commander of the regiment, Falkner returned to Mississippi and later led a Partisan Ranger unit.

The 2nd fought at the Battle of Seven Pines, and then the Seven Days Battles near Richmond, Virginia, with General Evander M. Law commanding the brigade. At the Battle of Gaines' Mill, the 2nd Mississippi joined an advance alongside John Bell Hood's Texas Brigade that broke through the Union lines, resulting in a Confederate victory. General Whiting wrote: "The Second Mississippi, Colonel J. M. Stone, was skillfully handled by its commander, and sustained severe loss". The regiment then fought at the Second Battle of Bull Run, taking part in heavy fighting as part of Hood's division.

Subsequently, the 2nd Mississippi fought at the Battle of Antietam in September, where they were engaged in some of the heaviest fighting on the bloodiest day of the war. Hood described the battle his troops were engaged in during his advance against the Federal lines: "the two little giant brigades of this division wrestled with this mighty force, losing hundreds of their gallant officers and men but driving the enemy from his position and forcing him to abandon his guns on our left". All of the field officers of the 2nd Mississippi were wounded in this battle, and the Regiment overall suffered 27 dead and 127 wounded at Antietam.

== Gettysburg ==
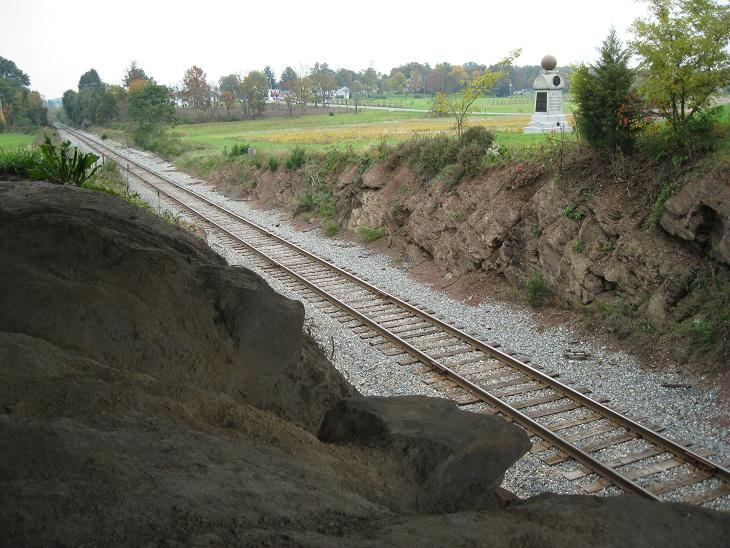
The railroad cut northwest of Gettysburg.

After Antietam, the 2nd Regiment was reassigned to General Joseph R. Davis's Mississippi brigade and took part in the Siege of Suffolk before moving north to Pennsylvania during the Gettysburg campaign. On the opening day of the battle, the 2nd Mississippi was among the first Confederate troops to engage Union forces, coming into contact with General John Buford's cavalry along the Chambersburg Pike to the northwest of the town of Gettysburg. Both sides suffered heavy casualties in intense fighting, with the troops of the 2nd Mississippi clashing with the 147th New York. The commander of the 147th New York was killed before he could relay the order for his troops to retreat, so the Federals held their ground while the 2nd Mississippi inflicted massive casualties on them; the New Yorkers suffered a greater than 50% casualty rate in this engagement. After taking cover in a steep-sided railroad cut north of the Chambersburg Pike, the 2nd Regiment was battered by intense enfilade fire, and the Regiment was forced to surrender after an assault by troops of the 6th Wisconsin. Approximately 127 men and officers, amounting to about 25% of the 2nd Regiment's strength, surrendered at the railroad cut.

Another detachment of the 2nd Mississippi was not captured, and joined Pickett's Charge on the last day of the battle. Of the approximately 60 troops of the 2nd who joined the charge, only one was not captured or wounded. Col. John M. Stone was wounded during the battle, Lt. Col. David W. Humphries was killed, and Major John A. Blair was captured at the railroad cut. The remnant of the Regiment took part in the Battle of Williamsport during the retreat from Gettysburg and the Battle of Bristoe Station in October.

== 1864–1865 ==
During the Battle of the Wilderness in May 1864, the Regiment's Col. Stone commanded a brigade comprising the 2nd, 11th, and 42d Mississippi Regiments, along with the 55th North Carolina and First Confederate Battalion. On the morning of May 6, Stone's brigade held their ground against a Union attack until Lieutenant-General James Longstreet's cavalry could counterattack. The Regiment fought at the Battle of Spotsylvania Court House, the Battle of North Anna, and the Battle of Cold Harbor during Union General Ulysses S. Grant's Overland Campaign.

Afterwards, the Regiment was moved to support the Confederate defensive lines during the Siege of Petersburg, fighting in numerous engagements until the fall of the city to Union forces in late March, 1865. At the time of the final Confederate surrender, one officer and 19 men were all that remained of the 2nd Mississippi.

== Commanders ==
Commanders of the 2nd Mississippi Infantry:

- Col. William Clark Falkner, Demoted and returned Mississippi in 1862.
- Col. John Marshall Stone, wounded at Gettysburg.
- Lt. Col. Bentley B. Boone
- Lt. Col. David W. Humphries, killed at Gettysburg.
- Lt. Col. John A. Blair, captured at Gettysburg.

== Organization ==
Companies of the 2nd Mississippi Infantry:

- Company A, "Tishomingo Riflemen"
- Company B, "O'Connor Rifles" of Tippah County.
- Company C, "Town Creek Riflemen" of Itawamba County.
- Company D, "Joe Matthews Rifles" of Tippah County.
- Company E, "Calhoun Rifles"
- Company F, "Magnolia Rifles" of Tippah County.
- Company G, "Pontotoc Minute Men"
- Company H, "Conewah Rifles" of Pontotoc County.
- Company I, "Cherry Creek Rifles" of Pontotoc County.
- Company K, "Iuka Rifles" of Tishomingo County.
- Company L, "Liberty Guards" of Tippah County.

== See also ==
- List of Mississippi Civil War Confederate units
