= Thomas Sutpen =

Character in novel by William Faulkner

Thomas Sutpen is a focal character of William Faulkner's 1936 novel Absalom, Absalom! Sutpen arrives in Faulkner's imaginary Yoknapatawpha County, Mississippi, in the 1830s and establishes a 64,000-acre (100-square-mile) plantation, Sutpen's Hundred, in an attempt to create his own dynasty. It is eventually revealed that Sutpen was born to a poor white family in what became West Virginia before moving to the Tidewater region of Virginia, where he was the first privy to the aristocratic plantation culture of the Antebellum South.

When he was fourteen, running errands for his father, Sutpen was instructed by a black servant to use the back door of the plantation house. This led him to renounce his family and social position. He traveled to the West Indies to build his own plantation and start a lineage, in accordance with his "design". The discovery that his wife was part black, making his son Charles Bon part black, caused him to leave them behind and relocate to Yoknapatawpha County, where he built a new plantation. The sins of his past and his indiscriminate sexual practices eventually cause the downfall of his empire in the early 20th century.

The short story "Wash", which was later incorporated into the seventh chapter of Absalom, Absalom!, focuses on Sutpen's death. Sutpen is also referenced in The Reivers.
