= Compson family =

- First appearance: The Sound and the Fury
- Created by: William Faulkner

In-universe information
- Nationality: American

The Compson family is a fictional family created by American author William Faulkner for use in his novels and short stories. A once prominent family in Yoknapatawpha County, Mississippi, the family began to fall on hard times in the twentieth century. Principally depicted in The Sound and the Fury and in its appendix, they also make appearances in Absalom, Absalom! and stories such as "That Evening Sun". The family name is also referred to briefly in the opening chapter of Requiem for a Nun. Faulkner traced their genealogy from 1699 to 1945.

== Compson family members ==
Jason Lycurgus Compson I; Quentin MacLachan Compson II (the Old Governor); Gen. Jason Lycurgus Compson II; Jason Richmond Lycurgus Compson III; his wife Caroline Bascomb Compson (–1933); their children Quentin (1891–1910), Jason (born 1894), Candace (known as Caddy), Benjamin (known as Benjy, originally named Maury before his name was changed) (1895–1936); Caddy's daughter (Miss) Quentin (born 1911).
