= Absalom, Absalom! =

1936 novel by William Faulkner

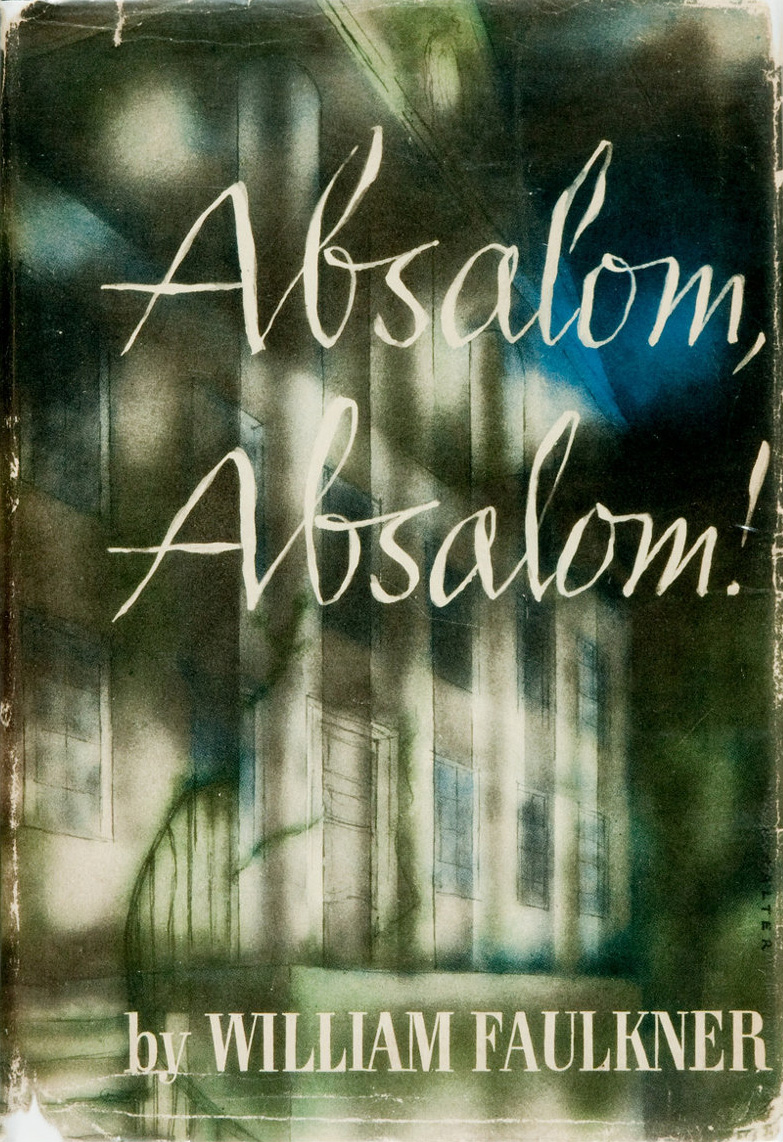
- First-edition cover
- Author: William Faulkner
- Cover artist: George Salter
- Language: English
- Genre: Southern Gothic
- Publisher: Random House
- Publication date: 1936
- Publication place: United States
- Pages: 384
- ISBN: 0-679-73218-7
- OCLC: 407010
- Dewey Decimal: 813.52
- LC Class: PS3511.A86
- Preceded by: Pylon
- Followed by: The Unvanquished

Absalom, Absalom! is a Southern Gothic novel by the American author William Faulkner. It was first published in 1936. Taking place before, during, and after the American Civil War, it focuses on the rise and fall of Thomas Sutpen, a plantation owner in the American South, as told by several unreliable narrators many years later.

== Plot summary ==
Absalom, Absalom! details the rise and fall of Thomas Sutpen, a white man born into poverty in western Virginia who moves to Mississippi with the dual goals of gaining wealth and becoming a powerful family patriarch. The story is told entirely in flashbacks narrated mostly by Quentin Compson to his roommate Shreve at Harvard College, a man who frequently contributes his own suggestions and surmises.

The narration of Rosa Coldfield, and Quentin's father and grandfather, are also included and re-interpreted by Shreve and Quentin, with the total events of the story unfolding in non-chronological order, and often with differing details. This results in a gradual revelation of the true story of the Sutpens.

Rosa initially narrates the story, with long digressions and a biased memory, to Quentin Compson, whose grandfather was a friend of Sutpen's. Quentin's father then fills in some of the details to Quentin. Finally, Quentin relates the story to his roommate Shreve. In each retelling, the reader receives more details as the unreliable narrators flesh out the story. The final effect leaves the reader more certain about the attitudes and biases of the characters than about the facts of Sutpen's story.

Thomas Sutpen arrives in Jefferson, Mississippi, with some slaves and a French architect who has been somehow forced into working for him. Sutpen obtains one hundred square miles of land from a local Native American tribe and immediately begins building a large plantation called Sutpen's Hundred, including an ostentatious mansion. All he needs to complete his plan is a wife to bear him a few children (particularly a son to be his heir), so he ingratiates himself with a local merchant and marries the man's daughter, Ellen Coldfield. Ellen bears Sutpen two children, a son named Henry and a daughter named Judith, both of whom are destined for tragedy.

Henry goes to the University of Mississippi and meets fellow student Charles Bon, who is 10 years his senior. Henry brings Charles home for Christmas, and Charles and Judith begin a quiet romance that leads to a presumed engagement. However, Thomas Sutpen realizes that Charles Bon is his son from an earlier marriage and moves to stop the proposed union.

Sutpen had worked on a plantation in the French West Indies as overseer and, after subduing a slave uprising, was offered the hand of the plantation owner's daughter, Eulalia Bon. They had a son, Charles. Sutpen did not know that Eulalia was of mixed race until after the marriage and birth of Charles. But when he discovered that he had been deceived, he renounced the marriage as void and left his wife and child (though leaving them his fortune as part of his own moral recompense). The reader also later learns of Sutpen's childhood, when young Thomas learned that society could base human worth on material worth. It is this episode that sets into motion Thomas' plan to start a dynasty.

When Sutpen tells Henry that Charles is his half-brother and that Judith must not be allowed to marry him, Henry refuses to believe it, repudiates his birthright, and accompanies Charles to his home in New Orleans. (Ellen Coldfield is traumatized by this event and retreats to a darkened room where she dies two years later.) Henry and Charles then return to Mississippi to enlist in their University company, joining the Confederate Army to fight in the Civil War. During the war, Henry wrestles with his conscience until he presumably resolves to allow the marriage of his half-brother and sister; this resolution changes, however, when Sutpen reveals to Henry that Charles is part black. At the conclusion of the war, Henry enforces his father's interdiction of marriage between Charles and Judith, killing Charles at the gates to the mansion and then fleeing into self-exile.

Thomas Sutpen returns from the war and begins to repair his dynasty and his home, whose hundred square miles have been reduced by carpetbaggers and punitive northern action to a paltry one square mile. He proposes to Rosa Coldfield, his dead wife's younger sister, and she accepts. However, Sutpen insults Rosa by demanding that she bear him a son before the wedding takes place, prompting her to leave what remains of Sutpen's Hundred. Desperately, Sutpen then begins an affair with Milly, the 15-year-old granddaughter of Wash Jones, a squatter who lives on the Sutpen property. The affair continues until Milly becomes pregnant and gives birth to a daughter. Sutpen is terribly disappointed, because the last hope of repairing his Sutpen dynasty rested on Milly giving birth to a son. Sutpen casts Milly and the child aside, telling them that they are not worthy of sleeping in the stables with his horse, who had just sired a male. An enraged Wash Jones kills Thomas, Milly, Milly's newborn daughter, and finally himself when he resists arrest.

The story of Thomas Sutpen's legacy ends with Quentin taking Rosa back to the seemingly abandoned Sutpen's Hundred plantation, where they find Henry Sutpen and Clytemnestra (Clytie), the daughter of Thomas Sutpen by a slave woman. Henry has returned to the estate to die. Three months later, when Rosa returns with medical help for Henry, Clytie mistakes them for law enforcement and starts a fire that consumes the plantation and kills Henry and herself. The only remaining Sutpen is Jim Bond, Charles Bon's black grandson, a young man with severe mental handicaps, who stays on the remains of the now dilapidated Sutpen's Hundred.

== Analysis ==
Like other Faulkner novels, Absalom, Absalom! allegorizes Southern history. The title refers to the Biblical story of Absalom, a wayward son of King David, who was killed while usurping his father's throne, causing grief and anguish to David. Discussing Absalom, Absalom!, Faulkner stated that the curse under which the South labors is slavery, and that Thomas Sutpen's personal fatal flaw was that he did not see himself as part of the human family. Faulkner also highlighted Sutpen's amorality, ruthlessness, self-centeredness, and his belief that he would get what he wanted because he was big enough and strong enough.

Faulkner stated that, although none of the narrators got the facts right since "no one individual can look at truth", a truth exists and the reader can ultimately know it. Most critics have tried to reconstruct this truth behind the shifting narratives, or to show that such a reconstruction cannot be done with certainty or even to prove that there are factual and logical inconsistencies that cannot be overcome. But some critics have stated that, fictional truth being an oxymoron, it is best to take the story as a given, and regard it on the level of myth and archetype, a fable that allows us to glimpse the deepest levels of the unconscious and thus better understand the people who accept (and are ruled by) that myth—Southerners in general and Quentin Compson in particular.

The use of Quentin Compson as the primary perspective (if not exactly the focus) of the novel makes it something of a companion piece to Faulkner's earlier work The Sound and the Fury, which tells the story of the Compson Family, with Quentin as a main character. Although the action of that novel is never explicitly referenced, the Sutpen family's struggle with dynasty, downfall, and potential incest parallel the familial events and obsessions that drive Quentin and Miss Rosa Coldfield to witness the burning of Sutpen's Hundred.

== In popular culture ==
The 1983 Guinness Book of World Records says the "Longest Sentence in Literature" is a sentence from Absalom, Absalom! containing 1,288 words (the record has since been broken). The sentence can be found in Chapter 6; it begins with the words "Just exactly like Father", and ends with "the eye could not see from any point". The passage is entirely italicized and incomplete.

The final lyric of "Distant Early Warning", a single released by the Canadian rock band Rush, is the word 'Absalom' repeated three times. Drummer Neil Peart, the band's lyricist, said he "loved the sound of" the title of Faulkner's novel and was inspired to look up the Biblical story of Absalom after reading the novel. "Since one of the main themes of the song was compassion, it occurred to me that the Biblical story was applicable."

== See also ==
- Circumlocution
- Rashomon effect
- Unreliable narrator

Preceded by Light in August	Novels set in Yoknapatawpha County	Succeeded by The Unvanquished
