= Quint =

Quint or Quints may refer to:

== In music ==
- A type of sackbut, a musical instrument
- A free-bass system for the accordion invented by Willard Palmer
- A type of pipe organ stop

== Vehicles ==
- Honda Quint, a subcompact car manufactured by Honda of Japan
- Quint (fire apparatus), a fire service apparatus combining features of an engine and a ladder truck
- A tandem bicycle with five seats

== People and fictional characters ==
- Quint (name), a list of people and characters with the surname or given name

== Other uses ==
- NATO Quint, an informal decision-making group consisting of France, Germany, Italy, the United Kingdom and the United States
- Quint-, a numeral prefix meaning five
- A component of a graphical GUI scroll bar widget
- Quintuplets, born as part of a multiple birth with five children
- Quints (film), a 2000 Disney Channel movie
- The Quint, an India based news portal
- Figure skating jumps (T S Lo F Lz) with base value of 14.00
