= Sartoris =

1929 novel by William Faulkner

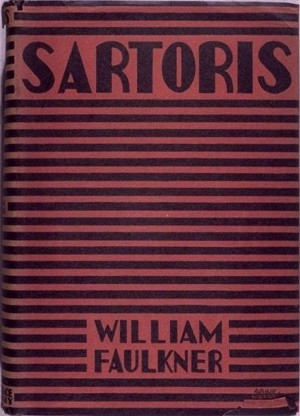
- First edition
- Author: William Faulkner
- Language: English
- Genre: Southern Gothic
- Publisher: Harcourt Brace
- Publication date: January 31, 1929
- Publication place: United States
- Media type: Print (Hardback & Paperback)

Sartoris is a Southern Gothic novel, first published in 1929, by the American author William Faulkner. It portrays the decay of the Mississippi aristocracy following the social upheaval of the American Civil War. The 1929 edition is an abridged version of Faulkner's original work. The full text was published in 2006 as Flags in the Dust (edited by Noel Polk, a Faulkner expert). Faulkner's great-grandfather William Clark Falkner, himself a colonel in the American Civil War, served as the model for Colonel John Sartoris. Faulkner also fashioned other characters in the book on local people from his hometown Oxford. His friend Ben Wasson was the model for Horace Benbow, while Faulkner's brother Murry served as the antetype for young Bayard Sartoris.

== Synopsis ==
The novel deals with the decay of an aristocratic southern family just after the end of World War I. The wealthy Sartoris family of Jefferson, Mississippi, lives under the shadow of its dead patriarch, Colonel John Sartoris. Colonel John was a Confederate cavalry officer during the Civil War, built the local railroad, and is a folk hero. The surviving Sartorises are his younger sister, Virginia Du Pre ("Aunt Jenny" or "Miss Jenny"), his son Bayard Sartoris ("Old Bayard"), and his great-grandson Bayard Sartoris ("Young Bayard").

The novel begins with the return of young Bayard Sartoris to Jefferson from the First World War. Bayard and his twin brother John, who was killed in action, were fighter pilots.

Young Bayard is haunted by the death of his brother. That and the family disposition for foolhardy acts push him into a pattern of self-destructive behavior, especially reckless driving in a recently purchased automobile.

Eventually young Bayard crashes the car off a bridge. During the convalescence which follows, he establishes a relationship with Narcissa Benbow, whom he marries. Despite promises to Narcissa to stop driving recklessly, he gets into a near wreck with old Bayard in the car, causing old Bayard to die of a heart attack. Young Bayard disappears from Jefferson, leaving his now pregnant wife with Aunt Jenny. He dies test-flying an experimental airplane on the day of his son’s birth.

== Background ==
In late 1926, William Faulkner, aged 29, began work on the first of his novels about Yoknapatawpha County. Sherwood Anderson had told him some time before that he should write about his native Mississippi, and now Faulkner took that advice: he used his own land, and peopled it with men and women who were partly drawn from real life, and partly depicted as they should have been in some ideal mythopoeic structure. A year later, on September 29, 1927, the new novel was completed. It was 596 pages long in transcript, and he called it Flags in the Dust. Full of enthusiasm, Faulkner sent Flags in the Dust up to Horace Liveright (who had published his first two novels) in New York. Liveright read it, disliked it, and sent it back with his firm recommendation that Faulkner not try to offer it for publication anywhere else: it was too diffuse, too lacking in plot and structure; and, Liveright felt, no amount of revision would be able to salvage it. Faulkner, crushed, showed Flags in the Dust to several of his friends, who shared Liveright's opinion.

Despite the adversity Faulkner had faced, he still believed that this would be the book that would make his name as a writer, and for several months he tried to edit it himself, sitting at his worktable in Oxford. Finally, discouraged, he sent a new typescript off to Ben Wasson, his agent in New York. "Will you please try to sell this for me?" he asked Wasson. "I can't afford all the postage it's costing me." In the meantime, convinced that he would never become a successful novelist, Faulkner began to work on a book that he was sure would never mean anything to anyone but himself: The Sound and the Fury.

Wasson tried eleven publishers, all of whom rejected Flags in the Dust. Finally he gave the typescript to Harrison Smith, then an editor of Harcourt, Brace & Company. Smith liked it, and showed it to Alfred Harcourt, who agreed to publish it, provided that someone other than Faulkner perform the extensive cutting job that Harcourt felt was necessary. For fifty dollars, Wasson agreed to pare down his client's novel. On September 20, 1928, Faulkner received a contract for the book, now to be called Sartoris (no one knows who changed its name), which was to be about 110,000 words long, and which was to be delivered to Harcourt, Brace sixteen days later. Faulkner left immediately for New York, presumably to help Wasson with his revision. But when he sat down in Wasson's apartment to observe the operation on his novel, Faulkner found himself unable to participate. If it were cut, he felt, it would die. Wasson persisted, however, pointing out that the trouble with Flags in the Dust was that it was not one novel, but six, all struggling along simultaneously. This, to Faulkner, was praise: evidence of fecundity and fullness of vision, evidence that the world of Yoknapatawpha was rich enough to last. As he later wrote of his third novel, "I discovered that my own little postage stamp of native soil was worth writing about and that I would never live long enough to exhaust it." Nevertheless, Wasson kept his bargain with Alfred Harcourt. For the next two weeks, while Faulkner sat nearby writing The Sound and the Fury, Wasson went through the typescript of Flags in the Dust, making cuts of every sort until almost a fourth of the book had been excised. Harcourt, Brace published this truncated version on January 31, 1929, as Sartoris (with a dedication: "To Sherwood Anderson through whose kindness I was first published, with a belief that this book will give him no reason to regret that fact"), and the old Flags in the Dust was soon forgotten by everyone but Faulkner.

== Literary importance ==
Sartoris is the first of Faulkner’s tales set in Yoknapatawpha County, and introduces many of the characters that appear in his later fiction. It was also the immediate predecessor of some of his most famous and critically acclaimed novels The Sound and the Fury, As I Lay Dying, Sanctuary and Light in August.

The novel also introduces Byron Snopes in a minor role as a rival suitor to Narcissa Benbow. His relative Flem Snopes is at the center of Faulkner’s "Snopes trilogy": The Hamlet, The Town and The Mansion.

In a letter to his publisher, Faulkner said "At last and certainly, I have written THE book, of which those other things were but foals. I believe it is the damdest best book you'll look at this year, and any other publisher".

Contemporary reviews, however, were mixed; while appreciating Faulkner's writing style, they stressed the book's seeming lack of consistency and its loose plot. The New York Times reviewer described it as "a work of uneven texture, confused sentiment and loose articulation," with "little persuasiveness and less unity" and "superficial treatment of his major characters," hoping that "in some future work Mr. Faulkner will be able to exercise more rigorous selection and concentration."

Literary critic Cleanth Brooks described the novel as "extremely well-written", full of literary allusions and exploring the plight of a Lost Generation. He compared Sartoris to the poem The Waste Land by T. S. Eliot.

Preceded by none	Novels set in Yoknapatawpha County	Succeeded by The Sound and the Fury
