= Flags in the Dust =

Novel by William Faulkner

- First edition (publ. Random House)
- Author: William Faulkner
- Publisher: Vintage Press
- Publication date: September 12, 1974
- ISBN: 978-0-394-71239-0

Flags in the Dust is a novel by the American author William Faulkner, completed in 1927. His publisher heavily edited the manuscript with Faulkner's reluctant consent, removing about 40,000 words in the process. That version was published as Sartoris in 1929. Faulkner's original manuscript of Flags in the Dust was published in 1973, and Sartoris was subsequently taken out of print.

== Plot ==
The novel deals with the decay of an aristocratic southern family just after the end of World War I. The wealthy Sartoris family of Jefferson, Mississippi, lives under the shadow of its dead patriarch, Colonel John Sartoris. Colonel John was a Confederate cavalry officer during the Civil War, built the local railroad, and is a folk hero. The surviving Sartorises are his younger sister, Virginia Du Pre ("Aunt Jenny" or "Miss Jenny"), his son Bayard Sartoris ("Old Bayard"), and his great-grandson Bayard Sartoris ("Young Bayard").

The novel begins with the return of young Bayard Sartoris to Jefferson from the First World War. Bayard and his twin brother John, who was killed in action, were fighter pilots.

Young Bayard is haunted by the death of his brother. In addition to feeling intense survivor guilt, Bayard senses instinctively that everyone in town liked John better. Both were superb athletes, and fearless fighters, but as Aunt Jenny frequently points out, "Johnny" Sartoris was friendly, cheerful and good-natured to old and young alike, while Bayard was cold, sullen, and moody even before the war. As a result of all this, Bayard secretly feels that he should have been killed in Johnny's place. That and the family disposition for foolhardy acts push him into a pattern of self-destructive behavior, especially reckless driving in a recently purchased automobile.

Eventually young Bayard crashes the car off a bridge. During the convalescence which follows, he establishes a relationship with Narcissa Benbow, whom he marries. Despite promises to Narcissa to stop driving recklessly, he gets into a near wreck with old Bayard in the car, causing old Bayard to die of a heart attack. Young Bayard disappears from Jefferson, leaving his now pregnant wife with Aunt Jenny. He dies test-flying an experimental airplane on the day of his son’s birth.

Preceded by Mosquitos	Novels set in Yoknapatawpha County	Succeeded by The Sound and the Fury
