= List of Spider Riders characters =

This is a list of characters for the Spider Riders novels and anime series.

== Spider Riders ==
A group of elite warriors who mount spiders and wield both armour and weapon.

- Hunter Steele

Voiced by: Motoko Kumai (Japanese); Julie Lemieux (English)

Hunter Steel is a boy who becomes a Spider Rider with his newfound battle spider "partner", Shadow, after falling into the subterranean Inner World. They often argue, mainly because of Hunter's cluelessness and ignorance and Shadow's pride and desire to work alone, believing that he does not need help from others. Hunter's grandfather, Digger, was also a Spider Rider and an earthling. When Hunter gains the power of an Oracle Key, his left shoulder pad grows larger and he can shoot webs. When he uses two Keys, his right shoulder pad transforms and he gains non-functional wings. When he uses three or four Keys, Hunter's wings retract and he gains metallic spider legs.

- Corona

Voiced by: Saeko Chiba (Japanese); Stacey DePass (English)

Discovering Hunter and Shadow, she escorts the new team to Arachna so they may be officially inducted into the ranks of the Spider Riders. She seems to care a lot for Hunter, who she has romantic feelings for, as does her spider Venus for Shadow. Corona has no family and was adopted by twins. It is later revealed that she is Aqune's long-lost sister and that they are both "Oracle Handmaids". Her weapons are a bow and arrows.

- Igneous

Voiced by: Takehito Koyasu (Japanese); Tim Hamaguchi (English)

A leading Spider Rider and captain of the Arachna military, serving the royalty of the Aracha Kingdom. Igneous takes Hunter's training seriously and almost acts as a mentor to him, to his annoyance. He challenged Hunter and Shadow to a duel when they joined the Riders, to see if Hunter could cooperate with Shadow. Igneous was part of the Arachna Knights, where he teamed up with his long-time friend Slate. They were known as "Claw" and "Fang" and proved to be powerful, especially since Igneous did not call upon his spider Flame to assist. His weapon is a cavalry lance which shoots flame.

- Prince Lumen

Voiced by: Kumiko Higa (Japanese); Cameron Ansell (English)

Leader of the Spider Riders and the Prince of Arachna. He is rather lazy for a ruler, preferring diplomatic solutions over fights, even against the Invectids, and preferring to negotiate with the enemy and only fight when absolutely necessary. Some say this is because his spider Ebony is so powerful that he is afraid to let it loose. Lumen is bright, talkative, and loves cute girls. His weapon is a chain sword.

- Princess Sparkle

Voiced by: Kaori Shimizu (Japanese); Melanie Tonello (English)

Lumen's younger sister, who points out that Hunter might save, not destroy, the Inner World. She visits Hunter in the night and advises him to bond with Shadow. Sparkle's spider is Hotarla, and her weapon of choice is a yo-yo-like device, which she attacked Grasshop with when he was trying to get away with one of the Keys.

- Magma

Voiced by: Kotani Kinya (Japanese); Lyon Smith (English)

A "lone rider" unaffiliated with the Arachna military along with his partner Brutus, who admires the hero Quake. He made a promise to find the purple spider Portia, who is Brutus's younger sister, and rescue her from the Invectids, a promise that keeps him from joining the ranks of Arachna. He later joins Hunter and the others to prevent the Invectids from stealing the Oracle Keys. His weapon is a mace that can switch to a flail.

- Aqune

Voiced by: Sanae Kobayashi (Japanese); Alyson Court (English)

Aqune (pronounced "A-coo-nay") is a Spider Rider in the service of the Invectid Buguese, who uses her to find the Oracle Keys. Aqune wears a mask that covers her face, which contains a mind control device. She has a deep sense of honor: while fighting Hunter and being unmasked, she cares for Hunter after they fall from a cliff, refusing to fight him because he was injured and weakened. Without her mask, Aqune cares for Hunter, who she returns the Oracle Key to. It is later revealed that Aqune is Corona's sister. She uses a glaive when unarmored, but her weapon of choice when transformed is a longsword. In "Welcome Back," Buguese frees her from the mask's control.

- King Arachna I

The first Spider Rider, known for defeating the Invectid army and stopping Mantid from taking the Oracle Keys in ancient times, which brought about the Spider Riders' creation.

- Brade/Quake

Voiced by: Chikao Otsuka

The legendary Spider Rider, made famous by a play that praises his ability to destroy the evil within enemies without killing them, who is rumored to have brought an Oracle Key to Nuuma. After fighting and losing to Mantid, he gave up on fighting and now resides in a forest, taking on the form of a small old man while awaiting the opportunity to fight Mantid again. He helps Hunter and Aqune escape Buguese's attack and uses his power to fulfill the Spider Riders' deepest desires in hopes of convincing Hunter to never fight again. However, Hunter's bravery and stubbornness made Quake drop his spell. Later, Quake decides to join the Human-Invectid war and rejoins the Spider Riders, regaining his youthful appearance. After the final battle, Quake joins the Lost Mariner and fades away as a ghost.

- Trigger Steele/Digger Steele

Hunter's late grandfather, who taught Hunter not to give up. He also fought alongside Quake in the old years as a Spider Rider.

=== Battle Spiders ===
- Shadow

Voiced by: Takashi Kondo (Japanese); Joseph Motiki (English)

Hunter's spider, a prideful and stubborn warrior who thinks that he does not need a rider, especially one who may be destined to bring disaster to Arachna like Hunter, and refuses to admit when he is wrong. Despite this, he is like a big brother, and he and Hunter make a great team. When he uses an Oracle Key, Shadow gains armor on his abdomen. When he uses two Keys, his two front legs grow abnormally longer and straight. When he uses three or four Jeys, Shadow gains two additional arms and two additional legs. He is said to have legendary strength, and is a direct descendant of the Ancestral Lord of Spiders.

- Venus

Voiced by: Sanae Kobayashi (Japanese); Caroly Larson (English)

Corona's spider. She is soft-spoken and gentle, but fearless in battle. She also cares for Shadow as a best friend.

- Flame

Igneous' silent spider, who possesses the ability to shoot webs made out of fire.

- Ebony

Voiced by: Kenta Miyake

Lumen's spider. Said to be very powerful and destructive, this causes Lumen to refrain from calling him out out of fear of accidentally hurting others. He does not talk after his first appearance, but finally talks to persuade Lumen to take his sister through the Labyrinth to get to Mantid's Castle.

- Hotarla

Voiced by: Yuu Asakawa (Japanese); Grace Fulliton (English)

Sparkle's spider. Unlike the other spiders, she is not a spider ready for battle and prefers to not take huge risks. She has distinctive large eyes.

- Brutus

Voiced by: Shigeru Chiba (Japanese); Darren Frost (English)

Magma's spider. He has tremendous strength, and is looking for his sister, Portia.

- Portia

Voiced by: Kumiko Higa (Japanese); Alyson Court (English)

Aqune's spider and Brutus's missing sister. Like Aqune, Portia wears a mask over her face that controls her.

- Dagger

Quake's spider. He is said to be a legendary battle spider and the strongest of all.

== Invectid (Insector) ==
The primary antagonists of the series, the Invectids are a race of humanoid insects that reside in the Invectid State and plot to conquer Arachna. Members of the Invectid race include:

- Lord Mantid

Voiced by: Hiroshi Yanaka (Japanese); Lawrence Bayne (English)

Mantid is a mantis-type Invectid who rules the loose-knit nation of Invectids. Unbeknownst to his followers, who believe him to be the ultimate in Invectid evolution, Mantid is actually a human posing as an Invectid and kills anyone who finds out. He needs the Oracle Keys to sustain himself or else his body turns white. After Hunter is captured in the Labyrinth, he is brought to Mantid's Castle and finally comes face-to-face with Mantid. He attempts to trick Hunter into getting the Oracle Keys for him until Quake tells Hunter of Maintid's true intentions. Mantid reveals that he was a human and a chosen warrior of the Oracle, pulled against his will into the Inner World. His reason for taking the Oracle's power is taking revenge upon the Inner World and the Oracle herself after suffering many losses, including his beloved. Mantid succeeds in absorbing the power of the Oracle Keys, but is spared by Hunter, after which he reverts to his original form and reunites with his lover Loraine.

=== The Big Four ===
Four of Mantid's mightiest warriors. They are:

- Buguese

Voiced by: Toshihiko Seki (Japanese); Jack Langedijk (English)

Mantid's right-hand man, a masked humanoid Invectid and the leader of the Big Four. He despises the Oracle for taking the sun away from the Invectids, and is eager to hurt her for what he thinks are her wrongs. Buguese claims to care little for his comrades, but has shown respect for Stags and concern for both Aqune, whom he is mentor to, and Beerain. Personally, he hates Hunter Steele for suffering many defeats at his hands. He wields a long crimson bladed sword. Initially a loyal and faithful servant of Mantid, over time he loses faith and trust in him, planning to destroy the Spider Riders and take control over the Invectid Nation from Mantid.

- Larva P. Grasshop

Voiced by: Shigeru Chiba (Japanese); Carman Melville (English)

A member of the Big Four. He is a grasshopper-type Invectid who uses technological devices to defeat enemies. Grasshop has seen little success against the Spider Riders and is seen with disdain and disappointment by the other members of the Invectids, as well as his wife Weeval and his children. After helping the Spider Riders escape captivity, Grasshop is seen as a traitor to the Invectids. Later on, after Grasshop takes the Spider Riders through the sewers, he is finally reunited with his family.

- Beerain

Voiced by: Yuu Asakawa (Japanese); Ellen Ray Hennessey (English)

A bee-type Invectid who wields a whip. When fighting, Beerain has no regard for honor and thinks winning is everything. In "Spies and Lies," she states that she is losing faith for Lord Mantid, but still has faith for Buguese and, in a flashback to when he was giving her an assignment, it is implied that she may have feelings for him. In the episode "Lumen's Love," Beerain dresses up as Lumen's childhood friend; even after Lumen finds out the truth, he willingly gives her the Oracle Key. After Beerain is blown away and his real friend arrives, he keeps searching for her calling Beerain his "true love". She is kicked out of the Big Four after learning Mantid's intentions for using Oracle's power. Upon returning to Invectid Fortress, Beerain overheard Mantid planning to use the Oracle's power solely for himself. She barely manages to escape, sustaining injuries to her wings. She attempts to warn Buguese of Mantid's true intentions, but he refuses to believe her due to her being a traitor.

- Stags

Voiced by: Kenta Miyake

Stags is an armored stag beetle-type Invectid who is powerful and loyal to the Invectid cause, being considered the most powerful of the Big Four. He wields a short Zanbato for a weapon and has a strong sense of honor, as he cannot stand when it is disrespected. Corona and Igneous once faced him, but barely managed to escape with their lives. Stags is able to defeat Hunter even with the aid of two Oracle Keys, but is defeated when Hunter uses a third Oracle Key. With his warrior spirit broken, Stags plunges from the castle to the ground below, but survives, discarding his broken sword and cape before leaving.

=== Other Invectid Warriors ===
Other Invectid warriors and characters throughout the series.

- Buzzbit

Voiced by: Kaori Shimizu

A small bug who is used by Dungobeet to spy on the Spider Riders and relay information.

- Unnamed Invectid Captains

A group of Invectid Captains who worked for Mantid. One Invectid led his troops to attack Tanda Village in search of something, but could not remember what they were searching for. Prince Lumen promised him their own village, with him as the self-appointed mayor, in exchange that they stop attacking Tanda Village. They stopped attacking and moved into their new village, where they were happy for some time. However, they soon decided to attack again, believing that conquest was something they needed, but were defeated by Lumen.

- Dungobeet

Voiced by: Takehito Koyasu

A dung beetle-type Invectid who works as their spy. Dungobeet sometimes rats on Grasshop to Grasshop's family. During a mission in the Labyrinth, he and Aqune used a Special Whistle to anger the creatures of the Maze. After Hunter is captured, Dungobeet attempts to destroy the Spider Riders with the beasts, but is captured by Quake.

- Weeval

Voiced by: Shigeru Chiba

Weeval is a weevil-type Invectid and Grasshop's wife. She appears taller than her husband and makes big curfews on him which he must follow or else he would not get his dinner. She cares for Grasshop and their two children. When the ground started shaking and they wanted Grasshop to come home and save them, they are delighted when he returns. She is only named in the English dub.

- Scarab

Voiced by: Tetsuya Sakai

A scarab beetle-type Invectid and leader of an Invectid transport platoon seen in episode 33. He is only named in the dub.

- Ninja Bug

An Invectid with the ability to project copies of itself. The true Invectid was revealed when Shadow shot his spider threads at the copies until there was only one which Hunter struck, sending it out the castle.

- Unnamed Flying Invectid

An Invectid that attacked the Spider Rider's ship on the journey back home from Nuuma. It appeared to spray a powder when Shadow and Hunter tried to hold them back.

=== Invectid Foot Soldiers ===
The Invectid Foot Soldiers are the foot soldiers of the Invectids. They come in different varieties and often accompany members of the Big Four or field commanders. Some of these variations include:

- Original Foot Soldiers - The lesser version of the Invectid Foot Soldiers. They are usually commanded by Buguese, Grasshop, and other high-ranked members of the Invectid Army.
- Stags' Foot Soldiers - Come in two varieties; white foot soldiers, which wield curved clubs/swords, and tan ones which wield throwing knives that resemble Stags' sword.
- Mantid's Royal Guards - Soldiers resembling ants who serve Castle Mantid.
- Enhanced Invectid Warriors - Invectids made from science and the Oracle's power, who are fast and strong; one was able to stand against the power of two Oracle Keys before being thrown back. They do not talk much.

=== Buzzrays ===
The Buzzrays are flying manta ray-like soldiers of the Invectids.

== Invectid machines ==
Giant metal insects used by the Invectids. Among those are:

- Smashopper - A giant metal grasshopper-type Invectid machine.
- Praying Mantech - A giant metal mantis-type Invectid machine.
- Billbug - A giant metal pill bug-type Invectid Machine who can roll into an indestructible ball form.
- Sphere-Beetle - An Invectid Machine that has three stages. The first form was little harmless balls called "sparkling orbs" which kids found in a crack. The second form is when the orbs fuse to create a light built Invectid. In this form, it uses telekinesis to use the kids as a shield. The last form is created when the Sphere-Beetle empowers itself using its remaining orbs. In this form, the Sphere-Beetle uses invisibility due to being too large to use its shield.
- Celpido - A giant metal centipede-type Invectid machine.
- Battle Beetle - A giant metal beetle-type Invectid machine who can generate a bright, blinding light.
- Cyber Cricket - A giant cricket-type Invectid machine that uses sound waves as its main attack.
- Battle Bug - A giant metal beetle-type Invectid machine used by Grasshop. It is armed with a laser cannon and can empower itself through fear.
- Iron Ant - A giant metal ant-type Invectid machine equipped with powerful pincers.
- Robo-Beetle - A giant beetle-type Invectid Mecca that is strong enough to survive the attack of one Oracle Key. It was destroyed when Hunter combined two Oracle Keys.
- Golden Bore - A huge Invectid Mecha that produces an indestructible shield called Gold Rush and a powerful burst of energy called Gold Fever that defeats all enemies in the area.
- Buzz-Warrior - One of Beerain's machines. It is capable of creating high winds and fires stingers from its abdomen.
- Dark Opal - An extremely powerful machine created by two Oracle Keys. It has laser beams in its eyes, mandibles that shoot a big energy sphere, and the ability to absorb the Oracle Key's power.
- Ark of Destiny - A boat created by Mantid. It is capable of firing energy beams, and can be resurrected by Mantid upon being destroyed.

== Other characters ==
Other characters who make appearances throughout the series, sometimes only once.

- The Spirit Oracle

Voiced by: Saeko Chiba (Japanese); Julie Lemieux (English)

The Spirit Oracle is the goddess of the Inner World. Whenever anything sacred to her is destroyed, it hurts her. The Spirit Oracle's power cannot be used with wicked intent. Following Mantid's defeat, the Spirit Oracle granted his wish, returning him to human form and reuniting him with Loraine.

- Lily

Voiced by: Takako Honda

Lily is the mystic prophet of Arachna castle. She was the first to find out that Hunter had entered the Inner world and feared he would bring misfortune.

- Quint

Voiced by: Hidetoshi Nakamura

Quint was the builder of the finest ship in the town of Fuushyua, which could go up the upwards waterfall. However, he would not lend it to the Spider Riders to get to Nuuma. When the Invectids destroyed his ship and Hunter saved him, Quint lent the Riders his new and improved ship on the condition that they return it, only for it to be left at a port in Nuuma. The Lost Mariner is his great-great grandfather.

- Slate

Voiced by: Anri Katsu (Japanese); Dan Petronijevic (English)

Slate (known as Grey in the Japanese version) was once an Arachnian knight who was a good friend and rival to Igneous, with them being known as the legendary "Fang and Claw". However, he left the rank of knights a long time ago, only to return and challenge Igneous to a duel. Through Hunter's investigation, he learns that Grasshop took a pendant of value from Slate and said that he would return it once Slate defeated Igneous. In exchange for defeating Igneous, Grasshop agreed not to destroy Slate's village.

- Sea Buff Mariner/Lost Mariner

Voiced by: Ryusuke Oobayashi

When he was young, he helped Quake deliver two of the Oracle Keys to Nuuma. Many years later, in "Ghost Ship", he helps the Spider Riders get through fog when they were under attack from Beerain and her Stingrays before mysteriously disappearing.

- Queen Elma/Illuma

Voiced by: Yuko Kobayashi (Japanese); Julie Lemieux (English)

The Queen of Nuuma, who sensed a familiar connection concerning Corona and Nuuma. When Illuma attempts to discover more about Corona's childhood, Corona is only able to reveal that she can recall her parents named her "Corona". It is later revealed that Illuma recognizes that Corona and her sister, Aqune, from when they were children and often visited Nuuma, and that they are both Oracle Handmaids. Illuma initially rejects the Spider Riders' offer to defend her castle because she feared they were too young. However, after Hunter and Corona disobey her orders and run off, she asks her troops to fight under the command of the Spider Riders. Igneous has a secret crush on her, but his feelings are not reciprocated, as Illuma loves Solan.

- Toure/Solan

Voiced by: Nozomu Sasaki

A loyal page at Castle Nuuma who serves Queen Illuma and acts as her confidante. He guides the Spider Riders upon their arrival into the city, to the castle, which has been lifted into the air. While he is surprised to see the Spider Riders are young, he has faith in them. He and Queen Illuma are in love with one another.

- Lemin/Katy

Voiced by: Megumi Toyoguchi

A Katydid-type Invectid who lives with the humans. She is a pacifist, so she left the Invectid Nation to live a peaceful life. Lemin was branded a traitor and is currently wanted for treason against Mantid.

- Sklar the Soul Eater

An ancient evil lies hidden in a tomb beneath a desert, whose power is kept in check by five mystic gems. He only appeared in the book series.

- Lady Noia

Voiced by: Yuka Takakura (Japanese); Megan Fahlenbock (English)

Prince Lumen's childhood friend, who Beerain impersonates in order to sneak into Arachna Castle and steal Hunter's Oracle Keys, while Grasshop disguised himself as Lady Noia's assistant. However, their attempts are thwarted, and, after Beerain discards her disguise, Lumen pursues her and misses the arrival of the real Lady Noia.
