= Paul S. Adler =

American management and organization scholar

- Born: Australia
- Known for: Enabling bureaucracy, Collaborative community, Critical perspectives on capitalism

Academic background
- Education: EHESS; University of Picardie
- Thesis: Automatisation et travail : le cas des banques (1981)
- Doctoral advisor: Michel Aglietta

Academic work
- Discipline: Management; Organization studies Sociology
- Sub-discipline: Organizational theory Political economy Technology management
- Institutions: Stanford University; University of Southern California

Paul S. Adler is an American academic specializing in organizational theory, management, and sociology. Before his appointment as Emeritus Professor, he held the Harold Quinton Chair in Business Policy at the University of Southern California (USC) Marshall School of Business. Adler is known for his research on the labor process, the management of technology and innovation, and the socio-economic implications of capitalism.

== Education ==
Adler was born in Australia and grew up and attended schools there before moving to France in 1974. He completed his higher education in France, including earning a master's degree in economic and social history from the School for Advanced Studies in the Social Sciences (EHESS) in 1978, and a Doctorate (Doctorat de Troisième Cycle) in economics and management from the University of Picardie in 1981. His supervisor was economist Michel Aglietta.

== Academic career ==
Adler began his academic career with research and teaching appointments at the French Ministry of Labor, the Brookings Institution, Columbia University, and Harvard Business School, where he was a postdoctoral scholar. From 1983 to 1991, Adler was at Stanford University, where he was an assistant professor in the Department of Industrial Engineering and Engineering Management. While at Stanford, Adler and Kim B. Clark developed a learning process model which took account of the impact of "identifiable managerial actions" on learning in a business context.

In 1991, he joined the Marshall School of Business at the University of Southern California, where he served as associate professor, later professor, and subsequently as the Harold Quinton Chair in Business Policy until being named Emeritus Professor.

He has also held visiting or honorary appointments at the University of Oxford, Manchester Business School, and Melbourne Business School. Adler served as the 70th president of the Academy of Management from 2014 to 2015.

== Honors and awards ==
- Recipient of the Best Paper award, Academy of Management Review (2002)
- Fellow of the Academy of Management (2013)
- Recipient of the “Article of the Decade” award, Academy of Management Review(2013)
- Delivered the Clarendon Lectures in Management, University of Oxford (2015)
- Companionship Award, British Academy of Management (2016)
- Distinguished Scholar Award, Academy of Management Organization and Management Theory Division (2021)
- Recipient of the 2022 “Best Article of the Year” award, Annals of the Academy of Management (2023)

== Books ==
- The 99 Percent Economy: How Democratic Socialism Can Overcome the Crises of Capitalism (Oxford University Press, 2019)
- The Oxford Handbook of Sociology, Social Theory, and Organization Studies: Contemporary Currents (Oxford University Press, 2014), co-edited with Paul du Gay, Gibson Morgan, and Michael Reed
- The Oxford Handbook of Sociology and Organization Studies: Classical Foundations (Oxford University Press, 2009)
- Healing Together: The Labor–Management Partnership at Kaiser Permanente (Cornell University Press, 2009), with Thomas A. Kochan and others
- The Firm as a Collaborative Community: Reconstructing Trust in the Knowledge Economy (Oxford University Press, 2006), co-edited with Charles Heckscher
- Remade in America: Transplanting and Transforming Japanese Management Systems (Oxford University Press, 1999), co-edited with Jeffrey K. Liker and Mark Fruin
