= Quintain =

Quintain may refer to:

- Quintain (company), a British property investment and development business
- Quintain (jousting), lance games
- Quintain (poetry), a poetic form containing five lines
- Slovene quintain, a traditional mounted folk game

== See also ==
- Quintaine Americana, a rock band
