= Jack K. Horton =

American lawyer and business executive

- Born: Jack King Horton; June 27, 1916; Stanton, Nebraska, U.S.
- Died: June 3, 2000 (aged 83); Los Angeles, California, U.S.
- Education: Stanford University
- Occupations: Lawyer, business executive
- Spouse: Betty Horton
- Children: 1 son, 2 daughters

Jack K. Horton (27 June 1916 - 3 June 2000) was an American lawyer and business executive. He served as the president, chief executive officer and chairman of Southern California Edison. During his tenure as chairman, he oversaw the construction of its new headquarters in Rosemead, California. He raised capital by increasing electricity rates for consumers and selling common stocks. He added two more nuclear reactors to the San Onofre Nuclear Generating Station.

== Early life ==
Jack King Horton was born on June 27, 1916, in Nebraska. He graduated from Stanford University in 1936. He was admitted to the California state bar in 1941.

== Career ==
Horton started his career at the Pacific Public Service Company in 1944. He was promoted to president in 1952. He subsequently served as the president of the Coast Counties Gas and Electric Company until he was appointed as the vice president of the Pacific Gas and Electric Company in 1954. Three years later, in 1957, he was appointed as the president and chief executive officer of the Alberta and Southern Gas Company, a company founded to transfer natural gas from Canada to California.

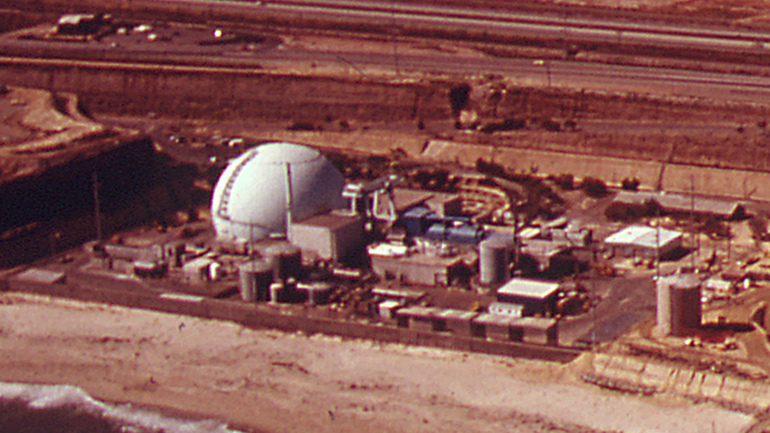
The San Onofre Nuclear Generating Station, where Horton decided to add two more nuclear reactors in 1970.

Horton served as the president of Southern California Edison from 1959 to 1968, and as its chief executive officer from 1965 to 1980. During that time, in 1969, he was appointed to serve on the Electric Power Council on Environment. Meanwhile, Horton also served as its chairman from 1968 to 1980. During his tenure as chairman, he oversaw the construction of parts of the Pacific DC Intertie. Meanwhile, he increased electricity rates for California consumers by 9.6% in 1968 to invest in new power plant constructions. Meanwhile, he also sold US$3 million of shares to raise more capital. Nevertheless, he did not raise sufficient funds to build a nuclear power and desalination plant on Bolsa Island, a man-made island off the coast of Bolsa Chica State Beach. However, by 1969, the company enjoyed "increases in operating revenues, net income and earnings per share." Meanwhile, the company built new headquarters designed by William L. Pereira in Rosemead, California. He also planned the construction of a new power plant on the Kaiparowits Plateau in Utah. By 1970, he added two nuclear reactors to the San Onofre Nuclear Generating Station in San Diego County, California. That same year, he raised capital by selling 500,000 commons stocks and increasing the rates by 16% for California consumers. Four years later, he planned to increase the rates again within the next two years. By the end of his tenure as chairman, in 1979, Horton was elected as the chairman of the Edison Electric Institute. Two years later, Southern California Edison honored him by establishing the Jack K. Horton Humanitarian Award given annually to their most charitable employee.

Horton served as the co-founder and chairman of the Executive Service Corps of Southern California in the 1980s. He also served on the board of directors of Lockheed Corporation and the Lutheran Hospital Society. Additionally, he served on the board of trustees of the University of Southern California and Stanford University as well as on the president's board of Pepperdine University.

== Personal life and death ==
Horton had a wife, Betty (? - 29 May 2000) who died just five before her husband's death. They had a son, Harold E. Horton, and two daughters, Judy Magee Horton and Sally Horton Meersman. They resided in Atherton, California. He died on June 3, 2000, in Los Angeles, California. He was 83 years old.
