= Red Leaves =

1930 short story by William Faulkner

"Red Leaves" is a short story by American author William Faulkner. First published in the Saturday Evening Post on October 25, 1930, it was one of Faulkner's first stories to appear in a national magazine. The next year the story was included in These 13, Faulkner's first collection of short stories.

"Red Leaves" has been described as "a vision of the inexorable, brutal pattern of nature that decrees that every living thing must die". The title of the story symbolizes the American Indian, specifically the Chickasaw:

The red leaves referred to the Indians. It was the deciduation of nature that had suffocated, smothered, destroyed the Negro. The red leaves had nothing against him when they suffocated him and destroyed him.

— William Faulkner

== Plot summary ==
With the death of Chief Issetibbeha, custom demands that all the Chickasaw leader's prized possessions be buried alive in the earth along with him. This includes his black servant, a slave who has served the chief since boyhood. The unnamed slave makes a desperate bid for freedom, taking refuge in the swamps and reflecting on his past life. Meanwhile, the dead chief's son Moketubbe, who is grossly overweight and has no real interest in leadership, is forced to marshal his forces and begin a manhunt for the fugitive slave. The few Indians willing to accompany Moketubbe are equally corrupt, decadent, and full of despair. As they slowly close in on the missing slave, they too reflect on the past, discussing the ways in which slavery and the coming of the white man have doomed them to crime, violence, and slow extinction as a people.
