= That Evening Sun =

1931 short story by William Faulkner

"That Evening Sun" is a short story by the American author William Faulkner, published in 1931 in the collection These 13, which included Faulkner's most anthologized story, "A Rose for Emily". The story was originally published, in a slightly different form, as "That Evening Sun Go Down" in The American Mercury in March of the same year.

"That Evening Sun" paints a stark portrait of the indifference of white Southerners to the deep-seated fears of one of their African American employees, Nancy. Narrated by Quentin Compson, one of Faulkner's most enduring characters, the story explores the reactions of Quentin and his siblings, Caddy and Jason, as they grapple with an adult world they do not fully comprehend. The African American washerwoman, Nancy Mannigoe, lives in fear that her common-law husband, Jesus, intends to kill her because she is carrying a white man's child.

== Plot summary ==
Quentin narrates the story in the turn of the century, presumably at age twenty-four (although in The Sound and the Fury he commits suicide at age nineteen), telling of events that took place fifteen years before. Nancy is an African-American washerwoman working for Quentin's family since their regular cook, Dilsey, is taken sick. Jesus, Nancy's common-law husband, suspects that she is pregnant with a white man's child and leaves her. At first Nancy is only worried about going home at night and running into Jesus, but later she is paralyzed with the fear that he will kill her, having delusions of him being hidden in a ditch outside her house.

Quentin and his siblings witness all of this, given that they are present for every major conversation between their father and Nancy. Mr. Compson tries to help her up to a certain extent, first by taking her home at night despite the fact that Mrs. Compson feels jealous and insecure that her husband is more worried about protecting some "Negro woman" than herself. He puts her up one night at Quentin and Caddy's room when she is too afraid to stay alone in the kitchen. The kids, however, have no idea of what's going on, and cannot understand Nancy's fear.

As the narrative progresses, Nancy becomes crippled by her fear. One night she feels so impotent that she talks the kids into going home with her. There, she is not able to attend to them, tell them proper stories or even make them some popcorn. Jason, the youngest, starts to cry. Their father arrives and tries to talk some sense into Nancy, who fears Jesus will come out of the darkness of the ditch outside as soon as they go away. The story ends as the father walks the children back—not the least bit affected by Nancy's situation, the kids still teasing each other and the father scolding them.

It is left ambiguous as to whether Nancy survives the night. However, in The Sound and the Fury, Benjy refers to Nancy's bones lying in the ditch, although she was "shot by Roskus" and it is implied that Nancy is the name of a horse.

== The title ==
The title is thought to be taken from the song Saint Louis Blues, originally composed by W.C. Handy, but popularized by Bessie Smith and Louis Armstrong in 1927. It begins with the line: "Lordy, how I hate to see that evening sun go down." The title implies that once the sun sets, death is sure to follow.

Faulkner first came across Handy's music when the latter played dances in Oxford, Mississippi. Though the song is never explicitly referenced in the text, Faulkner employs a number of blues tropes to structure the plot and develop racial stereotypes. Scholar Ken Bennett notes that "the image of the 'evening sun' is a common one in black religious music. For example, the spiritual It's Gettin' Late Over in the Evenin', the Sun Most Down, based on Revelation 20, uses the image of the evening sun to suggest the coming of death and judgment."

== Variation ==
In manuscript form, the story was written from Nancy's perspective and titled "Never Done No Weeping When You Wanted to Laugh."

This story appears as "That Evening Sun Go Down" in The Best American Short Stories of the Century by John Updike, Katrina Kenison. In this version of the story, Nancy's husband is called "Jubah", not Jesus, although a frightened Nancy whispers the word "Jesus" three times in Part II when Caddy is interrogating her. The substitution of Jubah for Jesus likely was made for censorship reasons. In the original magazine publication of the story, his name was rendered as "Jubah."

J.D. Salinger, in his 1964 essay "A Salute to Whit Burnett" (the editor of Story Magazine, Burnett was Salinger's mentor whose class in short story writing at Columbia University he attended in 1939 and who was the first professional to publish one of his stories), said that it was Burnett's use of "That Evening Sun Gone Down" in the class that taught him the importance of the author's relationship with his "silent reader".

Nancy's bones appear in The Sound and the Fury, but this is later revealed to be the name of a former Compson family horse. She is resurrected entirely as a Nun in Requiem for a Nun. Faulkner responded to a question about the story and the novel in Charlottesville by saying Nancy was “the same person, actually” in both texts, though he qualified his comment by adding, “These people I figure belong to me and I have the right to move them about in time when I need them” (FU79). To what extent and in what ways we ought to read Nancy, Quentin, and the others as “the same” from appearance to appearance thus remain issues open for debate.

== Resources ==
- BookRags (commercial) Study Guide on That Evening Sun
- Anthology of Thirties Prose Variant text That Evening Sun Gone Down
