= Dry September =

1931 short story by William Faulkner

"Dry September" is a short story by William Faulkner. Published in 1931, it describes a lynch mob forming (despite ambiguous evidence) on a hot September evening to avenge an alleged (and unspecified) insult or attack upon a white woman by a black watchman, Will. Told in five parts, the story includes the perspective of the rumored female victim, Miss Minnie Cooper, and of the mob's leader, John McLendon. It is one of Faulkner's shorter stories.

It was originally published in the January 1931 edition of Scribner's magazine, and later appeared in collections of his short stories. The story is in the American public as of January 1, 2026 as its copyright was registered in late 1930. (Note: Under R209255)

It includes an appearance by Hawkshaw, the barber who was the focus of Faulkner's later story "Hair".

== Plot summary ==
As a town creeps into September with nearly two months of heat and no rain, the tension is palpable. On a Saturday evening, a rumor burns through the town that Miss Minnie Cooper has been in some way attacked by a Negro, and so the town's men meet in the local barbershop to contemplate what needs to be done. They have decided it is Will Mayes, regardless of any proof.

They debate what to do. One barber insists that it may not have been Will and that they are jumping to conclusions without any proof. However, the men's fervor is raised enough that they deride the barber for trusting a black man over a white woman. Others show up who continue to fuel the discontent with what has supposedly happened.

Eventually, it's clear that, regardless of any crime, these men are intent on doing harm to a black man just to keep others from thinking them weak. Finally, they gather and head out to find Will Mayes. The story then shifts to Minnie. She was agreeable but not particularly spectacular in her town. As she grew older, she became less and less interesting and appealing—particularly to the single men; many assumed she had committed adultery and other questionable behaviors to entertain herself. She lived at home, taking care of her mother.

After this introduction, the story returns to the mob. The reluctant barber joins the mob in hopes of talking them out of it. They manage to capture Will, who seems oblivious to why they have captured, cuffed, and are threatening him. They beat him into submission and get him into the car.

The barber insists on getting out but the leader won't stop and tells him to jump, which he ultimately does. He stays to the side of the roads and, eventually, sees the cars returning with Will. The story returns to Minnie, who is going into town with her friends; many are whispering about what happened to her and to Will. When she enters the movie theater, she begins to laugh hysterically.

Minnie's friends eventually take her home and request the doctor, but her laughing gives way to screaming. Her friends finally wonder if anything actually happened. The story moves to the leader of the mob, who has returned home. His wife is waiting for him and he throws her aside, scolding her for staying up. He washes himself and goes to bed.
