= Saint-Quentin-de-Caplong =

- Commune
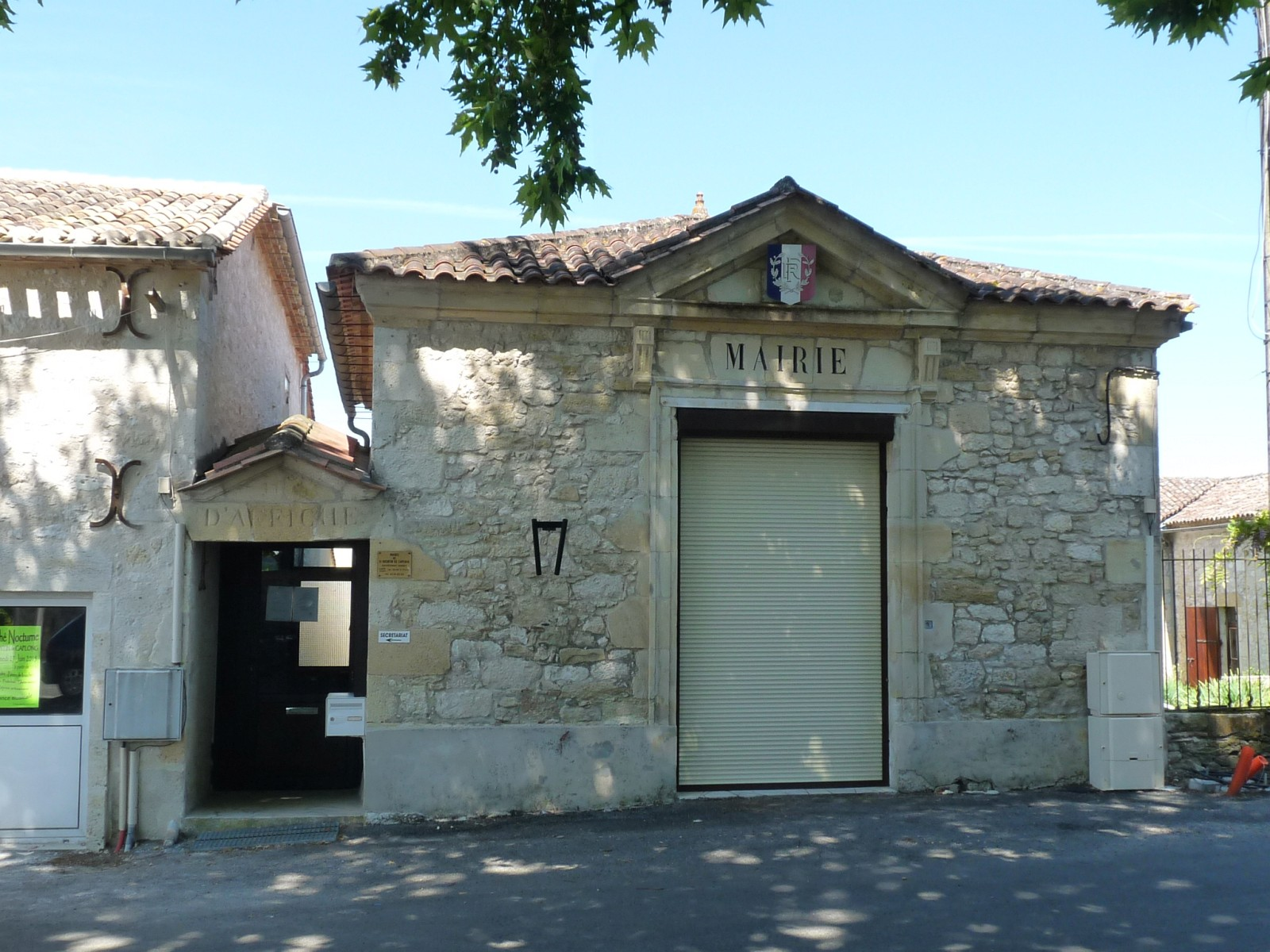
- The town hall in Saint-Quentin-de-Caplong

- Coat of arms
- Location of Saint-Quentin-de-Caplong
- Location within France Location within Nouvelle-Aquitaine
- Coordinates: 44°47′04″N 0°07′56″E
- Country: France
- Region: Nouvelle-Aquitaine
- Department: Gironde
- Arrondissement: Libourne
- Canton: Le Réolais et Les Bastides
- Intercommunality: Pays Foyen

Government
  - Mayor (2020–2026): Jean-Pierre Roubineau
- Area^{1}: 11.27 km^{2} (4.35 sq mi)
- Elevation: 90 m (300 ft)
- Highest elevation: 111 m (364 ft)
- Lowest elevation: 18 m (59 ft)
- Population (2023): 267
  - Density: 23.7/km^{2} (61.4/sq mi)
- Time zone: UTC+01:00 (CET)
  - Summer (DST): UTC+02:00 (CEST)
- INSEE/Postal code: 33467 /33220
- ^{1} French Land Register data, which excludes lakes, ponds, glaciers > 1 km^{2} (0.386 sq mi or 247 acres) and river estuaries.

Saint-Quentin-de-Caplong (French pronunciation: [sɛ̃ kɑ̃tɛ̃ də kaplɔ̃], literally Saint-Quentin of Caplong; Occitan: Sent Quentin de Cablong) is a commune in the Gironde department in Nouvelle-Aquitaine in southwestern France.

== Population ==
Historical population
Year	Pop.	±% p.a.
1968	402	—
1975	340	−2.36%
1982	293	−2.10%
1990	312	+0.79%
1999	276	−1.35%
2007	248	−1.33%
2012	247	−0.08%
2017	243	−0.33%
2023	267	+1.58%
Source: INSEE

== Heraldry ==
blazon1	Gules, a bend or charged with the inscription "SAINT QUENTIN DE CAPLONG" in capital letters sable and accompanied in chief by a flower stemmed and leaved proper and in base by a silver tower masoned sable.

== See also ==
- Communes of the Gironde department
