= Quint (name) =

Quint is a surname and a masculine given name. It may refer to:

Surname:

- Deron Quint (born 1976), American ice hockey player, formerly in the National Hockey League
- Jean-François Quint, French mathematician
- Michel Quint (born 1948), French writer
- Misha Quint (born 1960), Russian-born classical cellist and music director
- Olivier Quint (born 1971), French footballer and football coach
- Philippe Quint, Russian-American classical violinist
- Tracy Quint, American politician

Given name:

- Arthur Quentin Quint Davis (born 1947), American festival producer and director
- Quint Kessenich (born 1967), American sportscaster
- Pieter Philips Jurriaan Quint Ondaatje (1758-1818), Dutch politician

Fictional characters:

- Quint, a professional shark hunter in Peter Benchley's novel Jaws, as well as the film adaptation
- Quinton Chamberlain, in the American soap opera Guiding Light
- Quint (Mega Man), an evil robot in the Mega Man game series
- Quint, a shipwright in the series of novels Spider Riders
- Peter Quint, a principal character in the novel The Turn of the Screw

== See also ==
- Catherine Guy-Quint, a French politician
- Charles V, Holy Roman Emperor (1500-1558), also known as Charles Quint, ruler of the Spanish Empire and the Holy Roman Empire
