= Battle of St. Quentin =

There have been a number of battles known as the Battle of Saint Quentin, most of which were fought in the vicinity of Saint-Quentin, Aisne in Picardy, France.

- Battle of St. Quentin (1557), Spanish victory over the French in the Habsburg-Valois Wars
- Battle of St. Quentin (1871), during the Franco-Prussian War
- Battle of St. Quentin (1914), also known as the Battle of Guise, between French and German forces
- Battle of St. Quentin (1918), part of the German Spring Offensive Operation Michael
- Battle of Mont Saint-Quentin, attack at Mont St. Quentin near Péronne by the Australian Corps in August 1918
- Battle of St Quentin Canal, attack by the British Fourth Army on the Hindenburg Line in September 1918
- Capture of Saint-Quentin, encirclement of Saint-Quentin by the French First Army in October 1918

== See also ==
- Battle of the Canal du Nord
