= Quentin Compson =

Fictional character created by William Faulkner

Quentin Compson is a fictional character created by William Faulkner. He is an intelligent, neurotic, and introspective son of the Compson family. He is featured in the classic novels The Sound and the Fury and Absalom, Absalom! as well as the short stories "That Evening Sun" and "A Justice". After moving north to study at Harvard College, he eventually commits suicide by drowning himself in the Charles River.

== Character history ==
In 1929, Faulkner published The Sound and the Fury which chronicles Quentin's childhood in postbellum Mississippi as well as the last months of his life in Cambridge, Massachusetts at Harvard University, before hurling himself off a bridge on June 2, 1910. Quentin's thoughts are articulated with Faulkner's innovative stream-of-consciousness technique. In 1936, Faulkner published Absalom, Absalom!, which takes place before Quentin left for Harvard, in which Quentin attempts to solve and reflect on a mysterious tragedy in the past.

Quentin Compson is also the name of his niece, the illegitimate daughter of his sister Candace (Caddy).

== Commemoration ==
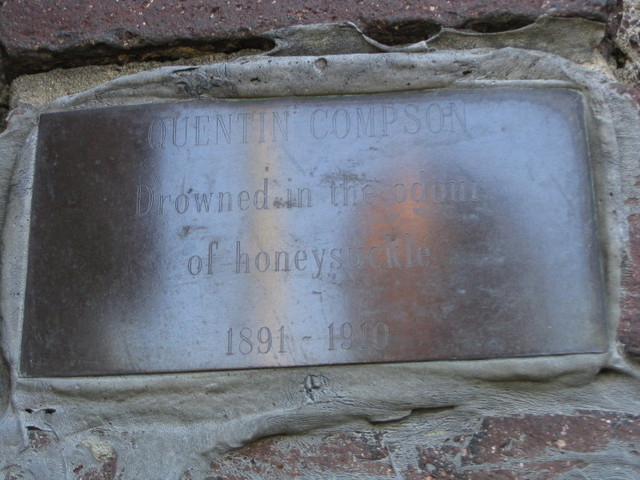
The plaque on Anderson Bridge

A plaque on the Anderson Memorial Bridge (commonly but incorrectly called Larz Anderson Bridge) over the Charles River in Cambridge, Massachusetts, commemorates his life and death. The small brass plaque, the size of one brick, is located on the brick wall of the Eastern (Weld Boathouse) side of the bridge, just north of the middle of the bridge span, about eighteen inches from the ground in a small alcove. The text on the plaque has slightly changed as a result of renovations to the bridge; its original and current (as of 2026) text reads:

"QUENTIN COMPSON III

Drowned in the fading of honeysuckle.

1891-1910"

== Sources ==
- Bombardieri, Marcella. "Bridging Fact and Fiction Marker a Nod to Faulkner." The Boston Globe. January 19, 2001.
