= Quentin (surname) =

Quentin is a surname. Notable people with the surname include:

- Carlos Quentin (born 1982), American baseball player
- Caroline Quentin (born 1960), English actress
- Charles Quentin (1810–1862), Wisconsin state senator
- Léonce Quentin (1880–1957), French archer
- René-Pierre Quentin (born 1943), Swiss footballer
