= Quinten =

Quinten may refer to:

== People ==
=== Surname ===
- Christopher Quinten (born 1957), British actor

=== Given name ===
- Quinten Burg (born 1948), American politician
- Quinten Hann (born 1977), Australian snooker player
- Quinten Hermans (born 1995), Belgian cyclist
- Quinten Joyner (born 2005), American football player
- Quinten Lawrence (born 1984), American football player
- Quinten Lynch (born 1983), Australian football player
- Quinten Post (born 2000), Dutch basketball player
- Quinten Rollins (born 1992), American football player
- Quinten Strange (born 1996), New Zealand rugby player
- Quinten Timber (born 2001), Dutch football player
- Quinten van Dalm (born 1972), Dutch badminton player

== Places ==
- Quinten, Switzerland

== Other ==
- Quinten, string quartet, number 2 of String Quartets, Op. 76 (Haydn)

== See also ==
- Quentin (disambiguation)
- Quintin, France
- Quinton (disambiguation)
