= Saint Quentin =

Gallo-Roman saint (died c.287 AD)

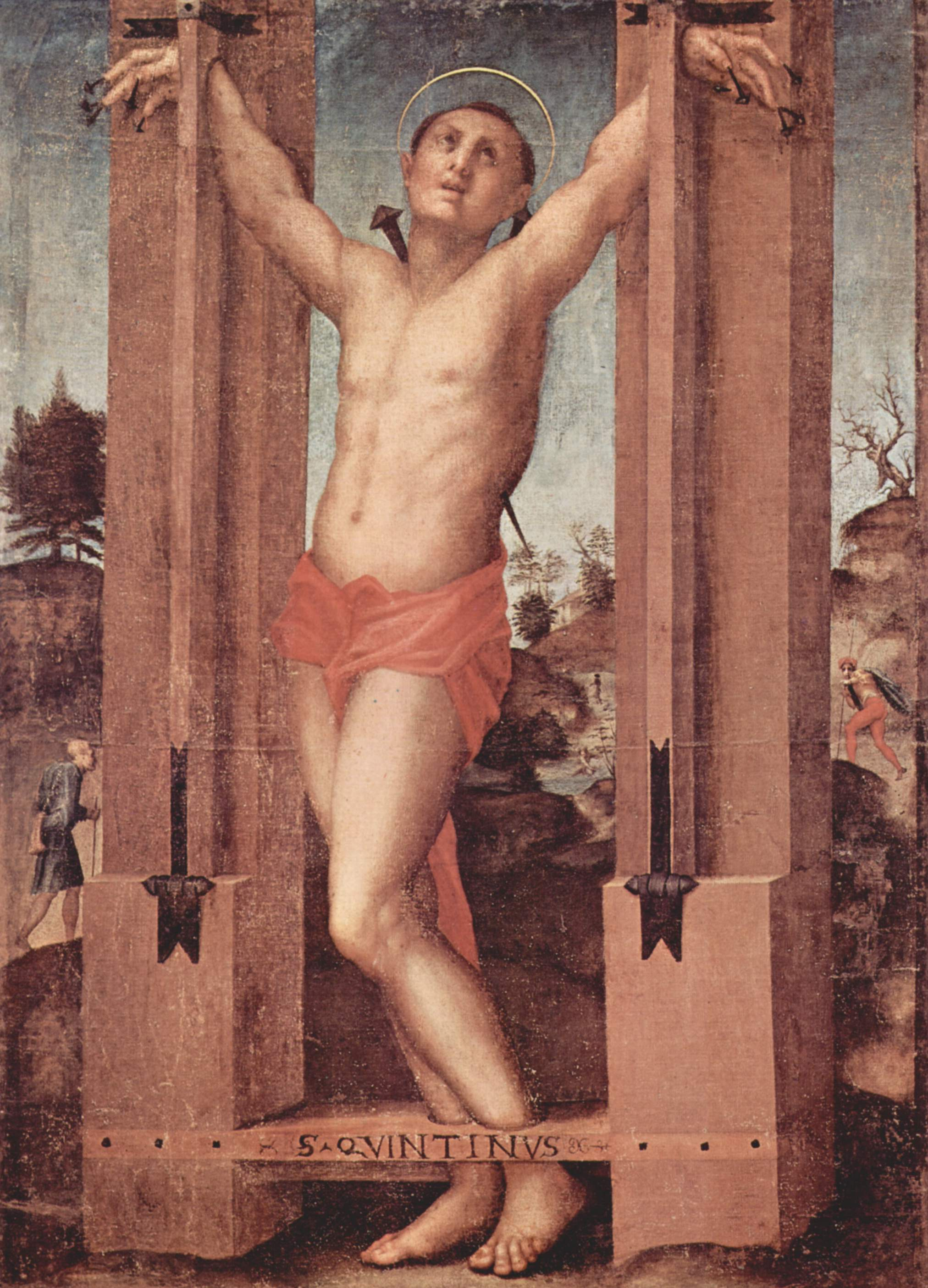
- The martyrdom of Saint Quentin, Jacopo Pontormo

Martyr
- Born: unknown
- Died: c. 287; Saint-Quentin, France
- Venerated in: Roman Catholic Church; Eastern Orthodox Church
- Major shrine: Saint-Quentin, France
- Feast: 31 October
- Attributes: depicted as a young man with two spits; as a deacon; with a broken wheel; with a chair to which he is transfixed; with a sword; or beheaded, a dove flying from his severed head
- Patronage: bombardiers, chaplains, locksmiths, porters, tailors, and surgeons. Invoked against coughs, sneezes, and dropsy

Quentin (Latin: Quintinus; died c. 287 AD) also known as Quentin of Amiens, was an early Christian saint.

== Hagiography ==
=== Martyrdom ===
The legend of his life has him as a Roman citizen who was martyred in Gaul. He is said to have been the son of a man named Zeno, who had senatorial rank. Filled with apostolic zeal, Quentin traveled to Gaul as a missionary with Lucian, who was later martyred at Beauvais, and others (the martyrs Victoricus and Fuscian are said to have been Quentin's followers). Quentin settled at Amiens and performed many miracles there.

Because of his preaching, he was imprisoned by the prefect Rictiovarus, who had traveled to Amiens from Trier. Quentin was manacled, tortured repeatedly, but refused to abjure his faith. The prefect left Amiens to go to Reims, the capital of Gallia Belgica, where he wanted Quentin judged. But, on the way, in a town named Augusta Veromanduorum (now Saint-Quentin, Aisne), Rictiovarus decided to interrupt his journey and pass sentence: Quentin was tortured again, then beheaded and thrown by the soldiers into the marshes around the Somme.

=== First inventio ===
Five years later, a blind woman named Eusebia, born of a senatorial family, came from Rome (following a divine order) and miraculously discovered the body, and a certain blind woman recovered her sight by the sacred relics. A small chapel was built nearby.

=== Second inventio ===
The life of bishop Eligius (mainly written in the seventh century), says that the exact place of the tomb was forgotten and that in 641, the bishop, after several days of searching miraculously found it. When the relics were discovered, together with the great nails with which the body had been pierced, Eligius distributed these nails, the teeth, and hair in other places, and enclosed the rest of the sacred treasure in a rich shrine of his own work, which he placed behind the high altar.

Eligius distributed the nails with which Quentin's body had been pierced, as well as some of his teeth and hair. As he was a skillful goldsmith, he placed the relics in a shrine he had fashioned himself. He also rebuilt the church (now Basilica of Saint-Quentin).

== Devotion ==
The devotion of Saint Quentin was important during the Middle Ages, especially in Northern France—as evidenced by the considerable number of place names derived from the saint's (see Saint-Quentin).
