= The Sound and the Fury =

1929 novel by William Faulkner

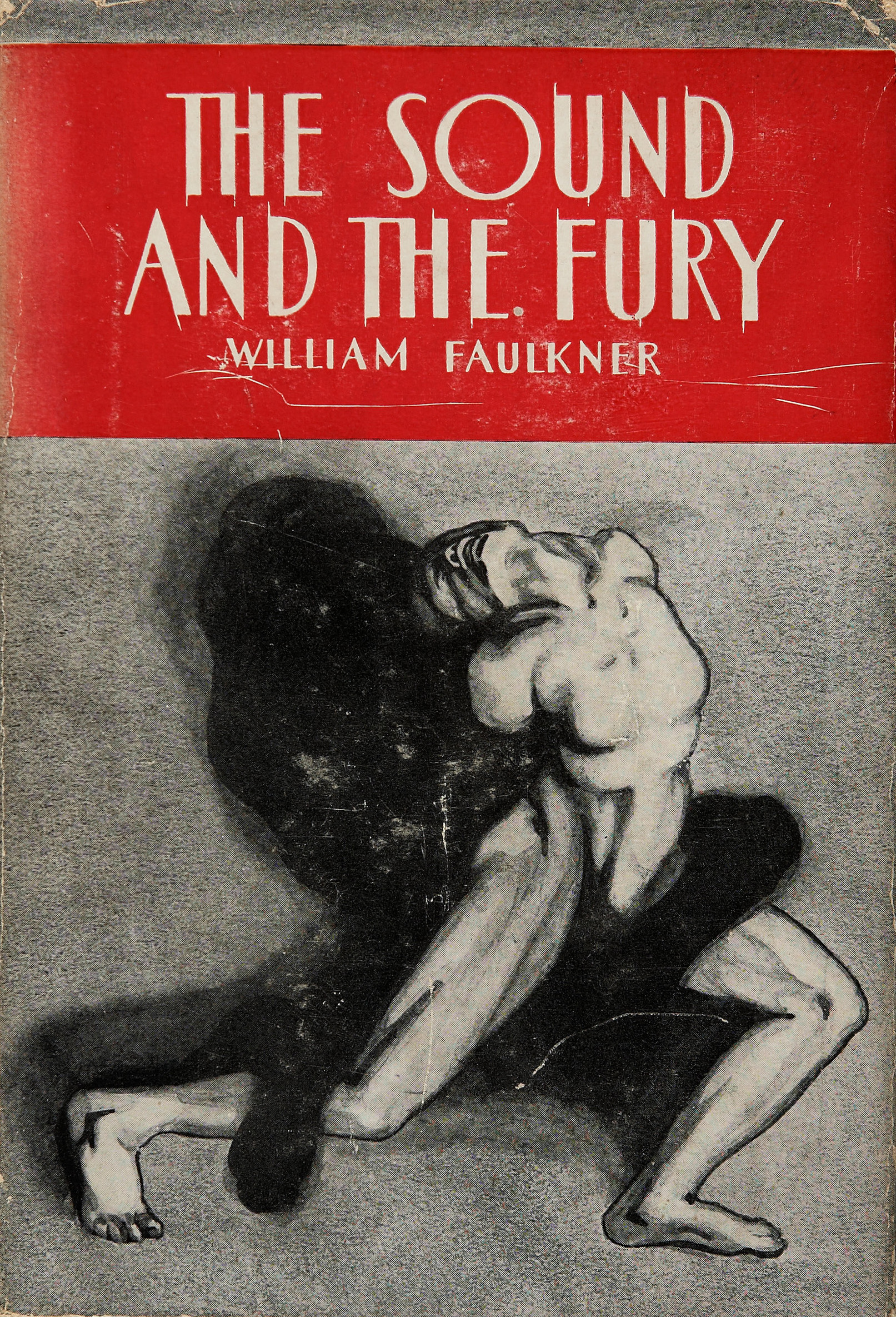
- First edition
- Author: William Faulkner
- Language: English
- Genre: Modernist novel Stream of consciousness Southern Gothic
- Published: 1929
- Publisher: Jonathan Cape and Harrison Smith
- Publication date: October 7, 1929
- Publication place: United States
- Pages: 326
- OCLC: 21525355
- Dewey Decimal: 813/.52 20
- LC Class: PS3511.A86 S7
- Text: The Sound and the Fury at Wikisource

The Sound and the Fury is a novel by the American author William Faulkner, published in 1929. Faulkner's fourth novel, it is the second to be set in Yoknapatawpha County and the first featuring the Compson family, both of which would reappear in his later fiction. The novel's highly experimental style, including its use of stream of consciousness and multiple different unreliable narrators, are hallmarks of modernist literature. Its bleak and candid portrait of Southern life in the early 20th century is paradigmatic of the Southern Gothic genre.

The Sound and the Fury centers around Quentin, Benjy, Jason, and Caddy Compson as their wealthy Mississippi family descends into chaos and disorder. Each of the siblings has unique problems that impact the others, such as Benjy's mental disability, Caddy's promiscuity, Quentin's neuroticism, and Jason's impulsiveness. The history of the Compson family is primarily revealed through sudden, unannounced flashbacks, as most of the novel takes place on a single weekend in 1928.

Although it did not initially find commercial success, after the publication of Faulkner's novel Sanctuary, The Sound and the Fury grew in popularity and Faulkner began to receive critical attention. It was instrumental in helping Faulkner to win the 1949 Nobel Prize in Literature. Now considered by scholars to be one of Faulkner's best novels, it has been described as "one of the most complex novels in America's literary history."

== Composition and publication ==
William Faulkner began writing The Sound and the Fury after a difficult experience publishing his third novel, Flags in the Dust. Because Faulkner's first two novels, Soldiers' Pay and Mosquitoes, sold poorly, the publisher Horace Liveright declined to publish Flags. Faulkner spent nearly a year trying to find an alternate publisher, and finally settled for Harcourt Brace, which only agreed to publish a substantially abridged version under the name Sartoris. Faulkner worried he would never be published again, and wrote The Sound and the Fury without expecting it to be marketable or published within the decade. Faulkner originally planned The Sound and the Fury as a short story, which would explore the thoughts of children sent away from their grandmother's funeral. He was also inspired by the image of a girl climbing a tree while her brothers looked up at her muddy underwear. Faulkner's working title for the novel was Twilight. The final title comes from a soliloquy in Macbeth, in which the title character describes life as "a tale told by an idiot, full of sound and fury, signifying nothing".

Faulkner drew inspiration from his own life. His own family had declined since the time of his great grandfather, who had been a colonel. When Faulkner was 10 years old, he and his two brothers lived with their female cousin Sallie. The four experienced the death of Faulkner's maternal grandmother, whom he called "Damuddy"; in the novel, Quentin Compson is the same age when his Damuddy dies. Faulkner knew a mentally disabled man in Oxford, Mississippi named Edwin Chandler, who was known for running behind a fence, and later wrote a story for the mentally disabled daughter of one of his professors at the University of Mississippi. When Faulkner's childhood love Estelle Oldham married another man, leaving him distraught, Faulkner took his mind off her by visiting his friend Phil Stone in New Haven, Connecticut. This trip inspired Quentin's experiences at Harvard and his relationship with his roommate Shreve. Shreve himself was based on a friend of Stone's named Stephen Benet, and was named after Benet's Yale roommate. Dilsey was modeled after Caroline Barr, the Faulkner family's servant.

Faulkner's stream of consciousness writing style was inspired by the works of James Joyce. (Note: Faulkner once gave his wife a copy of Ulysses, which he felt would help her understand his own writing.) Faulkner was also inspired by Ernest Hemingway; The Sound and the Fury borrows language from Hemingway's The Sun Also Rises to describe Benjy's castration. The novel also strongly resembles My Ántonia by Willa Cather: both novels use multiple perspectives to show the decay of a family with four children, both feature a mentally impaired brother, a dedicated servant, and a woman who is only seen from outside perspectives, and both prominently feature suicide. Faulkner also drew on his earlier short story The Kingdom of God, which also involved a mentally disabled character, and his then-unpublished stories That Evening Sun and A Justice, which both featured the character of Quentin Compson.

Faulkner finished the manuscript in Greenwich Village. In March 1928, he sent the manuscript to Harcourt Brace, which had published Sartoris. Harcourt Brace rejected the novel, but one of the company's editors, Harrison Smith, felt it deserved to be published. Smith formed a new publishing company called Jonathan Cape and Harrison Smith, which agreed to publish Faulkner's book. Faulkner extensively rewrote Quentin's section before the novel's publication. In particular, he moved the confrontation between Quentin and Caddy over Dalton Ames to three different positions; although it began as the opening scene of the chapter, Faulkner ultimately placed it at the end. He also experimented with the use of punctuation in Benjy's chapter as late as the galley proofs. Ben Wasson, the novel's editor, initially removed the italics from the first chapter and instead planned to represent its time shifts with line breaks, but Faulkner wrote Wasson a letter demanding he restore the italics. The book was finally published on October 7, 1929. Jonathan Cape commissioned one of their previously established writers, fellow Southern modernist Evelyn Scott, to produce a booklet analyzing the literary merit and justifying the difficulty of Faulkner's style to the American reading public, which was to be included with each copy of the initial run of the book. As the publisher's copy reads within the booklet, the hope of such an inclusion was to assert that: "'The Sound and the Fury' should place William Faulkner in company with Evelyn Scott."

== Plot summary ==
The Compsons, a once-prosperous white family, live in Jefferson, Mississippi. They have three sons: Quentin, Benjamin ("Benjy"), and Jason, along with a daughter named Candace ("Caddy"). The family also employs a black servant, Dilsey Gibson, who lives on their property with her family. Early in their childhoods, the Compson children's grandmother ("Damuddy") dies. Caddy climbs a tree to look inside her grandmother's room and observe her funeral, while her brothers look up at her mud-soaked underwear. Later, when Benjy is five years old, his parents realize he's severely mentally disabled and incapable of speech; his mother, who originally named him after her brother Maury, renames him Benjamin.

In 1909, Caddy has sex with a boy named Dalton Ames. Quentin, distraught, attempts to defend her honor. He proposes a joint suicide with Caddy, tries to fight Ames, and tells his father that he, not Ames, had sex with his sister. (Note: It is ambiguous which, if any, of these events actually happened, and which are merely Quentin's imagination. After the book's publication, Faulkner stated that Quentin only imagined the confession to his father.) The Compsons send Quentin to Harvard University, paying for his tuition by selling Benjy's share of the family's land. His parents then take Caddy, now pregnant, (Note: Some critics interpret Dalton Ames as the father of Caddy's child. Others believe the father was not Ames.) to French Lick, Indiana, where she meets a banker named Herbert Head. Caddy and Head marry in 1910, and Head promises Jason Compson a job at his bank. However, Caddy's father reveals that she was pregnant before meeting Head, leading Head to divorce her.

On June 2, 1910, Quentin plans to kill himself. After buying flat irons, he meets a young Italian girl who speaks no English at a bakery and tries to return her home, only for her brother to interpret him as a kidnapper. He reports Quentin to the authorities, who make him pay a fine. Later, Quentin attacks his boorish classmate Gerald Bland, who reminds him of Dalton Ames, but Bland knocks him unconscious. Quentin returns to his dorm to clean himself up, then uses the irons to drown himself in the Charles River. Caddy names her daughter Quentin ("Miss Quentin") after her late brother.

Over the following years, Mr. Compson dies from alcoholism, leaving Jason and his mother to run the house. Roskus, Dilsey's husband, also dies. Benjy's former plot of land, sold to pay for Quentin's tuition, becomes a golf course. Benjy is castrated after chasing a schoolgirl he believes to be Caddy. Caddy leaves Miss Quentin with Jason and her mother, but they refuse to let Caddy live with them. Instead, Caddy sends them money every month, which Jason keeps for himself.

Most of the novel takes place over Easter weekend in 1928. On Good Friday, Jason torments Miss Quentin, whom he blames for costing him the job at Head's bank, and unsuccessfully uses Caddy's money to short-sell cotton futures. On Holy Saturday, Benjy celebrates his 33rd birthday. Dilsey's grandson Luster looks after him while searching for a quarter so he can attend a traveling carnival; he ultimately receives one from Miss Quentin. That night, Miss Quentin steals Jason's money. She then escapes the Compson house by climbing down the same tree Caddy climbed as a child. On Easter, Dilsey takes her family and Benjy to a black church, where they listen to a sermon from Reverend Shegog. Meanwhile, Jason attempts to chase after Miss Quentin, who has left town with a man from the carnival. After catching up with the carnival in the nearby town of Mottson, Jason provokes a fight with one of the workers and injures himself in the confrontation. Having failed to find Miss Quentin, he hires a black man to drive him home. Back in Jefferson, Luster takes Benjy to the town cemetery, but travels the wrong way around a Confederate monument in the town square. Jason returns to find Benjy crying over this disruption to his routine; he intervenes and takes Benjy the right way.

== Style and structure ==
I had a quarter of the book written, but it still wasn't all. It still wasn't enough. So then Quentin told the story as he saw it and it still wasn't enough. Then Jason told the story and it still wasn't enough. Then I tried to tell the story and it still was not enough.

— William Faulkner

The Sound and the Fury is divided into four chapters of roughly equal length. Like Ulysses and Mrs. Dalloway, the first three chapters are written as stream-of-consciousness internal monologues, each covering a single day. Although the plot of the novel is revealed nonlinearly, the events of each individual day are told chronologically.

The four chapters show a progression of how the family relates to Caddy. The first chapter focuses on Caddy's childhood, the second on her adolescence, and the third on her adulthood. The fourth chapter shows her absence from the family and the family's decay without her. Critic Victor Strandberg argues the novel is structured after Beethoven's Eroica: Sections 1 and 4 are heroic, section 2 is a funeral march, and section 3 is a satirical scherzo.

=== Part 1: April 7, 1928 ===
There was a light at the top of the stairs. Father was there, in his shirt sleeves. The way he looked said Hush. Caddy whispered,

"Is Mother sick."

Versh set me down and we went into Mother’s room. There was a fire. It was rising and falling on the walls. There was another fire in the mirror. I could smell the sickness. It was a cloth folded on Mother’s head. Her hair was on the pillow. The fire didn’t reach it, but it shone on her hand, where her rings were jumping.

"Come and tell Mother goodnight." Caddy said. We went to the bed. The fire went out of the mirror.

— Benjy Compson, The Sound and the Fury

The first chapter is narrated by Benjy, a mentally disabled man who does not distinguish memories of his past from his present. Although the chapter is set in 1928, it focuses on Benjy's memories of events prior to June 1910, especially his sister Caddy's wedding, his mother's decision to rename him, and his earliest memories from the day Damuddy died. Each time the narrative returns to Damuddy's death day, those memories resume chronologically where they left off; the chapter ends as Benjy remembers falling asleep with Caddy that night.

Benjy uses short, direct sentences. He has a limited vocabulary of around 500 words, mostly for concrete objects, which forces him to use circumlocution and invent compound words. Benjy himself is mute, but he can relay complex grammar and vocabulary from other characters' speech, even when he does not understand what they mean. However, he exclusively punctuates quoted dialog with periods, flattening speakers' emphasis and emotions. He almost exclusively uses the verb "said", even when this leads to repetition; on one page, he repeats the phrase "Luster said" ten times. Benjy sometimes interweaves separate conversations as though they took place simultaneously. If he does not know who said a line of a dialog, he reports the words without quotation marks or attribution.

Benjy describes events in isolation, failing to understand cause and effect. For example, he does not connect the action of turning off the lights with his observation that "the room went away". He assigns agency to inanimate objects and his own body parts, which he perceives as moving on their own. He does not anticipate the future. His sensory experiences are synesthetic; he smells temperature and experiences arousal, fear, and contentment as "bright shapes". When he becomes drunk, he does not recognize his own disorientation, instead believing the family's cows are jumping around. Since Benjy does not see how his experiences are related, the reader has to structure his observations on his behalf. Benjy thus inverts the usual role of a narrator, which would traditionally contextualize and interpret a story's events.

Benjy's narration combines events from different time periods, which creates a disorienting effect. In the present, he hears golfers call for a caddie, which triggers memories of his sister Caddy. (Note: Taylor Hagood notes that Benjy's narration does differentiate these words by their spelling, implying that Benjy does understand the distinction between the golf caddy and his sister.) Later, he interweaves memories: of his father's funeral with his brother Quentin's, Caddy's romance in a swing with her daughter's later romance in that same swing, and Caddy's wedding with the first time she wore perfume at age 14.

When the narration moves to a new time period, the book's font usually transitions between italic and roman type, but not always. (Note: Benjy's chapter also uses italics to distinguish "foreground" vs "background" dialog when he hears multiple conversations at the same time.) This text formatting is non-diegetic; Benjy does not understand these connections or the chronological transitions himself. In total, the chapter contains over a hundred narrative fragments from around 16 different points in time. These shifts in time become more frequent as the chapter goes on. Benjy's memories highlight things he's lost, especially his sister. In the present, Luster consistently misinterprets why Benjy is sad. However, in his memories, Caddy understands Benjy's emotions and provides clarity.

Despite Benjy's confusion, he presents an unbiased view of events. He also understands things other characters do not, such as immediately recognizing Caddy is no longer a virgin and intuiting that her wedding is not celebratory, but tragic.

=== Part 2: June 2, 1910 ===
If things just finished themselves. Nobody else there but her and me. If we could just have done something so dreadful that they would have fled hell except us. I have committed incest I said Father it was I it was not Dalton Ames And when he put Dalton Ames. Dalton Ames. Dalton Ames. When he put the pistol in my hand I didn’t. That’s why I didn’t. He would be there and she would and I would. Dalton Ames. Dalton Ames. Dalton Ames. If we could have just done something so dreadful and Father said That’s sad too, people cannot do anything that dreadful they cannot do anything very dreadful at all they cannot even remember tomorrow what seemed dreadful today and I said, You can shirk all things and he said, Ah can you.

— Quentin Compson, The Sound and the Fury

The second chapter is narrated by Benjy's brother Quentin, who is often compared to James Joyce's character Stephen Dedalus. Quentin spends the day planning to drown himself, although he does not reveal this explicitly. He unsuccessfully tries to avoid knowing what time it is, such as by avoiding his shadow and breaking his watch. However, he cannot ignore some signs of time, like clock bells. Quentin spends his final day overwhelmed by guilt, blaming himself for failing to protect Caddy's "virtue" and for attending Harvard with the proceeds from Benjy's land.

Quentin's narration covers fewer time periods than Benjy's, but the transitions between them are less clearly defined. He drifts in and out of memories, and his associations between memories are often unclear. Pronouns like "he" abruptly switch referents. Time continues to pass in the present while Quentin remembers the past, creating a disorienting effect when his memories end. Quentin compulsively repeats things his father told him. Early in the chapter, he only mentions Caddy and Benjy indirectly, but he is eventually overtaken by memories of them.

Throughout his narration, Quentin attempts to maintain self-control. He sometimes controls his memories, but at other times they control him. His thoughts are interrupted by memories of past conversations, especially his confession of incest. When he's in control of his mental state, he thinks in complex, grammatically correct sentences. When he is less in control, he thinks in staccato fragments, omits punctuation, does not capitalize words, and flattens the emotions and inflections of dialog like his brother Benjy. When he viscerally relives the past rather than merely remembering it, his narration appears in italics.

Quentin's mental state also affects the layout of text on the page. He does not indent paragraphs during two memories: a conversation with Caddy's fiancé Herbert Head, and the confrontation with her lover Dalton Ames. These events are closely related in Quentin's mind, and both represent the lowest points of his narrative control. Quentin conflates both Head and Ames with his classmate Gerald Bland; when he fights Bland, he imagines he is actually fighting Ames.

=== Part 3: April 6, 1928 ===
The third chapter is told by Jason Compson, whom Faulkner considered "the most vicious character [...] I ever thought of". Jason's narration is more straightforward than Benjy's or Quentin's, although he describes his financial affairs with minimal context and interweaves his internal monologue with external conversations. Like Benjy and Quentin, Jason loses himself in his memories. However, his changing focus does not affect the chapter's formatting, typeface, or punctuation. While the first two chapters have much in common with literary modernism, Jason's narration owes more to the works of Robert Browning and Sinclair Lewis. In particular, critic Thomas McHaney describes Jason as "a vicious version of Lewis’s George Babbitt".

Jason resents his family and his position in life. Eighteen years after his sister's divorce, he remains bitter over never receiving the job at Head's bank, and he obsesses over the loss of his investments and his family's land. Despite consistently misreading the people around him, he obsesses over how he himself is perceived. Jason believes he is fundamentally unlike his brothers, but he is equally defined by his childhood relationship to Caddy. Although he hates his father, he unwittingly lives in accord with his father's nihilistic philosophy and lacks sympathy for anyone else. His narration is marked by slurs and negative stereotypes directed against women, African Americans, and Jews. He frequently uses the word "damn", which is rendered as "dam", and he reduces his view of the world into simplistic formulas, introduced by the refrain "Like I say".

Jason does not reveal his plans to torment others, such as when he burns his tickets to the carnival instead of giving them to Luster, leaving his actions and the extent of his cruelty a surprise. However, his cruelty is often self-destructive. Jason deliberately antagonizes Miss Quentin and his boss Earl for no benefit, buys a car even though he's nauseated by gasoline, and neglects both his job and his cotton investments to chase Miss Quentin around town. Throughout his monologue, Jason attempts to rationalize his irrational, spiteful behavior.

=== Part 4: April 8, 1928 ===
Unlike the first three chapters, the final chapter uses external third-person narration rather than relaying one character's perspective. This narration provides the novel's first descriptions of how characters look. For example, Benjy is described as a grotesque man who walks like a trained bear.

This final chapter illustrates Dilsey's role as the family's sole source of stability; the rest of the family is disrupted by Miss Quentin's escape, but Dilsey attends Easter service as she normally would. The Easter sermon is marked by Code-switching between formal English and African-American Vernacular English. The sermon also uses the same narrative techniques as the novel itself: Reverend Shegog quotes disconnected fragments from different perspectives, emphasizing the emotional weight of the Passion rather than its linear events. After the sermon, the narrative jumps backward in time, describing Jason's experiences while Dilsey and Benjy were at church.

Although the narration is not tied to one perspective, it primarily focuses on one character at a time. When following Dilsey, the narration focuses on characters' behaviors rather than their thoughts; however, the narration does have access to Jason's thoughts. According to critic Margaret Blanchard, the narrator's understanding corresponds to the reader's own at this point in the book: the narrator has no knowledge of future events, relies on inference, and understands Jason's and Benjy's mindsets more than Dilsey's. When describing Dilsey, the narration is dignified as she prepares for the Easter service, then becomes more intense as she is moved by the sermon. When describing Jason's actions, the narration uses a frantic, overwrought, and mocking writing style. The chapter ends with a focus on Benjy, bookending the novel with his experiences. (Note: In the novel's final scene, Luster takes Benjy to the cemetery. This mirrors one of the first memories in Benjy's chapter, in which his previous caretaker TP took him along the same route.)

== Appendix ==
In 1945, Faulkner wrote a new appendix for the novel, covering the history of the Compson family from 1699 through 1945. Faulkner originally intended the appendix to be included in The Portable Faulkner as a preface to the novel's fourth chapter, which was excerpted from the rest of the novel. He believed he should have included the appendix when he first wrote the novel, and asked Random House to include it at the beginning of the novel's next edition. However, editions of the novel which include the appendix have instead placed it at the end.

The appendix depicts the Compson family as the descendants of the Scottish Quentin MacLachan, who fled the Battle of Culloden. In America, the family received land from the Chickasaw and established a plantation, only to decay following the South's loss in the American Civil War. The appendix ends with Benjy in a mental institution, Caddy in Nazi Germany, and Miss Quentin having fled her family. Thus, the appendix is bookended by two Quentins leaving home.

Faulkner admitted that he wrote the appendix without re-reading the novel. As a result, the two are inconsistent. For example, Miss Quentin is now years older than Luster instead of the same age, and she now escapes by climbing a rain pipe instead of the tree her mother climbed as a child. Faulkner's editor Ben Cowley pointed out the appendix's inconsistencies, but Faulkner chose not to reconcile them. Editor Noel Polk opted not to include the appendix in a modern edition, arguing that it leaves the novel's ambiguity "seriously compromised", while Frédérique Spill criticized the appendix as a "didactic" afterthought.

== Analysis and themes ==
=== Nihilism, religion, and morality ===
Critic Edmond Volpe describes the novel's tone as nihilistic despair, similar to T.S. Eliot's poem The Waste Land. The Compson family as a whole is nihilistic. In particular, Mr. Compson rejects Christian morality in favor of stoicism and a Nietzschean worldview. Although Quentin looks to his father for moral guidance, Mr. Compson treats Caddy's virginity as meaningless and does not condemn Quentin's ostensible incest. Quentin's thoughts often return to Jesus and Francis of Assisi, but he is unable to gain moral insight from their examples or let their perspectives overcome his father's nihilism. Meanwhile, Mrs. Compson is obsessed with "virtue", but her shallow moral code only harms her family. Jason rejects any code of honor and only values money and "reason", yet fails to make reasonable decisions.

The novel contains ironic parallels between the Compsons and Jesus, emphasizing the ways the family falls short of Jesus' example. At Caddy's wedding, Benjy gets drunk on champagne he believes is sarsaparilla, parodying Jesus' miraculous transformation of water into wine at the wedding at Cana. 18 years pass between Quentin's section and Benjy's, mirroring the 18 years between Jesus' childhood activity in the temple and adult ministry. When Dilsey and Mrs. Compson discover Miss Quentin's escape and Jason's empty money box, the scene recalls Mary and Martha discovering Jesus' empty tomb. The novel's four chapters reflect the four canonical gospels, and the chapter dates associate Benjy's experiences with the Harrowing of Hell and Jason's with Good Friday. In the novel's final scene, Benjy holds a narcissus. While the flower traditionally symbolizes resurrection, his is broken.

In contrast to the Compsons themselves, their servant Dilsey is the moral center of the book. Critic Thomas McHaney associates her with the Suffering Servant in Isaiah 53. While Dilsey's life is difficult, her regimented tasks and religious faith give her a structure and clear foundation that the rest of the family lacks. Dilsey attends church on Easter, while Mrs. Compson lays in bed next to an unread Bible. She treats people as individuals rather than abstractions, and embraces empathy over reason. When her daughter Frony becomes pregnant and gives birth to Luster, Dilsey accepts them both, in contrast to the Compsons' cruel treatment of Caddy and her daughter. While Benjy is confused by time, Quentin fights against it, and Jason is always late, Dilsey alone has a healthy relationship with time. She knows how to compensate for the Compsons' broken clock to tell the correct time, and she is comfortable listening to Shegog preach about eternity. The Easter service she attends contrasts Christianity's promises of strength and renewal against the moral failings of the Compsons. After the church service, Dilsey holds Benjy in her lap, taking on the role of Mary in the Pietà. While the Compsons are defeated by the nihilism of the modern world, Dilsey and her family endure.

=== Post-war southern identity ===
The novel is widely understood as depicting the decay of the South following the Civil War, with each Compson brother's narrative depicting a different aspect. Faulkner has implied this is in part due to the Compsons being unable to let go of the past, once answering they were a disaster because "They live in the 1860s."

Nemmers argues that Benjy embodies negative African-American stereotypes due to his mental disability, being understood by those around him as a child, rapist, animal, criminal. He is othered as a white man for his disability and for his proximity to African-Americans in being dependent on them. For example, the white townsfolk barr him from their churches but repulse him when he instead attends Dilsey's black church. Nemmers concludes that Benjy, therefore, represents the breakdown of his role as a Southern aristocrat in his association with blackness; he writes that "Benjy's case exposes the unsettling truth that in the South anybody that deviated from the norm could be treated as black, regardless of the appearance or 'blood' of that body."

Critics have argued that Quentin's internalization of Southern aristocratic code and pressure to conform to it pushes him to idealize and guard Caddy’s sexuality. St. Clair reads his lie about starting a sexual relationship with Caddy as an attempt to recover her honor, believing incest would be preferable to sex outside of marriage, and therefore the home. In this sense, Quentin's obsession with Southern ideas of honor during a period of breakdown his father contributes to is considered, by Faulkner, a fixation equivalent to the taboo of incest. Quentin's struggle to acclimate to the Northern environment of Harvard adds to the existing pressure of his family sacrificing their land to send him there, hoping he would recover their status.His dilemma depicts a South whose economic instability following the war makes it harder for them to reconcile with the rest of the nation.

Jason's portion of the novel makes this economic aspect explicit - he has spent 18 years upset over the sale of Compson pastures to send Quentin to Harvard, what Godden calls "northern credit in the form of status," and at his northern bank job opportunity being rescinded after Herbert divorced Caddy. Hanson reads Jason's fixation on money as a reflection of the South’s socioeconomic "pressure to change along Northern lines." Jason clings to the memory of the Compsons as a wealthy plantation family to deal with the humiliation of economic struggles in the face of a more prosperous north, depicted by the travelling show, the loss of patriarchal control over the women in his house, and the position of black townsfolk, including the Compson's servants, following the Reconstruction era. His attempts to reclaim control and reassert the Compson's old Southern identity – by unsuccessfully gambling on the stock market with Caddy's money or flouting work to stalk Quentin – are what directly lead him to lose his job and savings.

Hempstead argues that Caddy's rejection of Compson values and eventual departure is what allows her to be the only Compson sibling successfully able to carve out a new identity and continue her lineage through Quentin. There is, however, tension in this reading against Caddy's loss of her daughter and Faulkner explicitly describing her as "doomed" in the appendix.

== Reception ==
Upon publication the influential critic Clifton Fadiman dismissed the novel, arguing in The Nation that "the theme and the characters are trivial, unworthy of the enormous and complex craftsmanship expended on them." But The Sound and the Fury ultimately went on to achieve a prominent place among the greatest of American novels, playing a role in William Faulkner's receiving the 1949 Nobel Prize in Literature.

It is nearly unanimously considered a masterpiece by literary critics and scholars, but its unconventional narrative style frequently alienates new readers. Although the vocabulary is generally basic, the stream-of-consciousness technique, which attempts to transcribe the thoughts of the narrators directly, with frequent switches in time and setting and with loose sentence structure and grammar, has made it a quintessentially difficult modernist work.

The work has entered the public domain as of January 1, 2025.

== Adaptations ==
A 1959 film adaptation was directed by Martin Ritt, starring Yul Brynner as Jason Compson and Joanne Woodward as Miss Quentin. The film was substantially different from the novel, focusing almost entirely on the relationship between Jason and Miss Quentin rather than the family as a whole. Unlike in the novel, Miss Quentin ultimately decides not to leave the Compson house. The film has generally been considered a poor adaptation.

Another adaptation, The Sound and the Fury (2014), was directed by James Franco and starred Franco as Benjy Compson, Jacob Loeb as Quentin Compson, Joey King as Miss Quentin, Tim Blake Nelson as Mr. Compson, Loretta Devine as Dilsey, Ahna O'Reilly as Caddy Compson, Scott Haze as Jason Compson, Kylen Davis as Luster, Seth Rogen as a Telegraph Operator, Danny McBride as a Sheriff, and Logan Marshall-Green as Dalton Ames. It made its premiere at the 71st Venice International Film Festival, where it screened out-of-competition.

== See also ==
- Le Monde's 100 Books of the Century

== Notes ==
Preceded by Sartoris or Flags in the Dust	Novels set in Yoknapatawpha County	Succeeded by As I Lay Dying
