= Quincy (name) =

- Pronunciation: /ˈkwɪn.si/, KWIN-see
- Gender: Unisex
- Language: English

Origin
- Languages: English, Norman
- Origin: de Quincy (surname)
- Region of origin: England

Other names
- Related names: Quin, Quinn

Quincy, formerly de Quincy, is usually an English toponymic surname of Norman origin, but may also be a given name. For members of the prominent American political family from the mid-17th century to the early-20th century, see Quincy political family.

Other notable people with the name include:

== Surname ==
- Roger de Quincy, 2nd Earl of Winchester, Norman nobleman
- Saer de Quincy, 1st Earl of Winchester, Norman nobleman
- John Quincy Adams (1767–1848), US president from 1825 to 1829

== Given name ==
- Quincy Acy (born 1990), American basketball player
- Quincy Adams, multiple people
- Quincy Adeboyejo (born 1995), American football player
- Quincy Alexander (born 1993), Trinidad and Tobago track cyclist
- Quincy Allen (born 1979), American serial killer
- Quincy Antipas (born 1984), Zimbabwean footballer
- Quincy Tyler Bernstine, American actress
- Quincy Bent (1879–1955), American businessman
- Quincy Black (born 1984), American football player
- Quincy Boogers (born 1995), Dutch footballer
- Quincy Breell (born 1992), Aruban long jumper
- Quincy Brown (born 1991), American actor and singer
- Quincy K. Brown, American computer scientist
- Quincy Butler, multiple people
- Quincy Carter (born 1977), American football player
- Quincy Coleman (born 1972), American singer and musician
- Quincy Coleman (born 1975), American football player
- Quincy Davis, multiple people
- Quincy Detenamo (born 1979), Nauruan Olympic weightlifter and convicted manslaughterer
- Quincy Diggs (born 1990), American basketball player
- Quincy Douby (born 1984), American-born Montenegrin basketball player
- Quincy Downing (born 1993), American sprinter
- Quincy Dodd (born 2000), Australian rugby league footballer
- Quincy Enunwa (born 1992), American football player
- Quincy Adams Gillmore (1825–1888), American civil engineer and Union Army general
- Quincy Guerrier (born 1999), Canadian basketball player
- Quincy Hamilton (born 1998), American baseball player
- Quincy Matthew Hanley (born 1986), American rapper and songwriter known as Schoolboy Q
- Quincy Jones, (1933–2024), American record producer and musician
  - Quincy Jones, multiple people
- Quincy Mauger (born 1995), American football player
- Quincy McDuffie (born 1990), American football player
- Quincy McMahon (born 2002), American professional soccer player
- Quincy Mumford (born 1991), American singer and musician
- Quincy Alden Myers (1853–1921), Justice of the Indiana Supreme Court
- Quincy D. Newell (born 1976), American historian
- Quincy Owusu-Abeyie (born 1986), Ghanaian footballer
- Quincy Penn (born 2005), Bahamian sprinter
- Quincy Promes (born 1992), Dutch footballer
- Quincy Rhodes Jr. (born 2004), American football player
- Quincy Riley (born 2001), American football player
- Quincy Roche (born 1998), American football player
- Quincy Adams Shaw (1825–1908), American businessman and investor
- Quincy Vaughn (born 2001), Canadian football player
- Quincy Williams (born 1996), American football player
- Quincy Wilson, multiple people

== Fictional characters ==
- Dr. R. Quincy, M.E.; titular character of the TV show Quincy, M.E.
- Quincy, a character of the Disney show Little Einsteins
- Quincy, titular character of the eponymous comic strip Quincy (comic strip)
- Quincy, one of the Heroes in tower defense game Bloons TD 6
- Quincy, a race in the Shonen Manga bleach
