= List of ghost towns in Michigan =

This is a list of ghost towns in Michigan.

== Classification ==
=== Barren site ===
- Site no longer in existence
- Site has been destroyed or submerged
- Reverted to pasture
- May have a few difficult-to-find foundations or footings at most

=== Neglected site ===
- Only rubble left
- All buildings uninhabited
- Roofless building ruins
- Some buildings or houses still standing

=== Abandoned site ===
- Buildings or houses still standing
- Buildings and houses all abandoned
- No population, except caretaker(s)
- Site no longer in existence except for one or two buildings (for example old church, grocery store)

=== Semi-abandoned site ===
- Building or houses still standing
- Buildings and houses largely abandoned
- Fewer than 50 residents (small population)
- Many abandoned buildings

=== Historic community ===
- Building or houses still standing
- Smaller than its boom years
- Population has decreased dramatically, to one-fifth or less
- May be a census designated place, or have been absorbed by another settlement

== List ==
Name	Other names	County	Settled	Abandoned	Status	Ref.
Alcona		Alcona County				
Amble		Montcalm County	Before 1886	Post office closed in 1953	Semi-abandoned	
Antrim City		Antrim County	Began as a shipping hub for Wood, Pearl & Company in 1861		Barren	
Aral		Benzie County	1880	1911		
Baltic		Houghton County				
Bass Lake		Grand Traverse County				
Beitner		Grand Traverse County				
Berringer Corners		Missaukee County				
Berryville						
Bertrand		Berrien County				
Big Rock		Montmorency County				
Bingham		Leelenau County				
Bolton		Alpena County				
Bond's Mill		Wexford County				
Branch		Branch County				
Brookside		Osceola County				
Butternut		Montcalm County				
Calvin Center		Cass County				
Cambridge Junction		Lenawee County				
Central		Keweenaw County				
Chestonia		Antrim County	1899	after 1962	Barren	
Cleon		Manistee County				
Clifton	Cliff					
Colonville						
Copper Falls						
Crawfords Quarry						
Crescent						
Crofton						
Damon						
Deward						
Dighton						
Disco		Macomb County	1849			
Duncan		Cheboygan County				
Earth						
East Bay						
Eckford						
Emerson						
Eschol						
Essex						
Evans						
Fayette		Delta County				
Federman						
Fish Lake						
Fleming						
Frederick						
Geels						
Geloster						
Gibbs City	Atkinson	Iron County				
Good Harbor						
Grafton						
Grape		Monroe County				
Goo						
Hallock						
Hannah						
Hard Luck						
Harlan						
Havre						
Henry						
Herron		Alpena County				
Hodge						
Isadore						
Jacktown						
Jennings						
Kenneth		Mackinac County				
Kelloggsville		Kent County				
Kensington						
Keystone						
Killmaster		Alcona County				
Leer						
Lathrop						
Lupton						
Mabel						
Mandan		Keweenaw County				
Manseau						
Mansfield		Iron County				
Marlborough		Lake County				
Martins Landing						
Mentha		Van Buren County				
Meredith						
Metz						
Milton		Macomb County				
Mitchell						
Monroe Center						
Mottville						
Neahtawanta		Grand Traverse County				
Nessen City						
Nicholsville						
Nonesuch		Ontonagon County				
North Unity		Leelanau County				
Old Mission		Grand Traverse County				
Omard		Sanilac County				
Onominese		Leelanau County				
Park Lake						
Peacock						
Pennock						
Pequaming						
Pere Cheney						
Port Crescent		Huron County				
Pinnepog						
Podunk						
Pokagon		Cass County				
Port Sheldon						
Potts (McKinley)						
Print (Griner Station)						
Quinn						
Rattle Run		St. Clair County				
Rawsonville						
Rushman						
Sharon						
Shattuckville		Saginaw County				
Shavehead						
Sheffield						
Shelldrake						
Shiawassee Town						
Sigma						
Singapore						
South Assyria						
South Boardman						
Springvale						
Star City						
Steiner		Monroe County				
Stittsville						
Standale		Kent County				
Stoney Creek		Monroe County				
Stover						
Stratford						
Summit City						
Superior						
Temple						
Trowbridge						
Tunk						
Union						
Vermilion						
Volinia		Cass County				
Walton						
Watervale						
Wekwagamaw						
Wetzell						
Whiskey Creek						
Whitefish Point						
Wilson						
