= Quinn (given name) =

- Gender: Unisex
- Language: English

Origin
- Language: Irish
- Origin: Quinn (surname)
- Meaning: "Son of Conn"
- Region of origin: Ireland

Other names
- Related names: Quin, Quincy

Quinn is a unisex given name, derived from an Irish surname.

Notable people with the given name include:

== Notable people with the name include ==
- Quinn Allman (born 1982), American musician
- Quinn Bailey (born 1995), American football player
- Quinn H. Becker (1930–2022), American Army general
- Quinn Bradlee (born 1982), American filmmaker and writer
- Quinn Buckner (born 1954), American basketball player
- Quinn Carpenter (born 1996), American ice dancer
- Quinn Carroll, American football player
- Quinn Christopherson, American singer-songwriter
- Quinn Cook (born 1993), American basketball player
- Quinn Costello, American basketball player
- Quinn Cummings (born 1967), American actress and writer
- Quinn Dehlinger (born 2002), American freestyle skier
- Quinn Do (born 1975), American poker player
- Quinn Dornstauder (born 1995), Canadian basketball player
- Quinn Duffy (born 1970), American actor
- Quinn (musician) (Quinn Dupree, born 2004), American musician
- Quinn Early (born 1965), American football player
- Quinn Ewers (born 2003), American football player
- Quinn Farrell (born 2002), Virgin Island soccer player
- Quinn Finley (born 2004), American ice hockey player
- Quinn Gleason (born 1994), American tennis player
- Quinn Golden (1954–2003), American singer
- Quinn Gray (born 1979), American football player
- Quinn Grovey (born 1968), American football player
- Quinn Hughes (born 1999), American ice hockey player
- Quinn Hutson (born 2002), American ice hockey player
- Quinn Johnson (born 1986), American football player
- Quinn Josiah (born 2000), Canadian soccer player
- Quinn Kelsey (born 1978), American operatic baritone
- Quinn Lord (born 1999), Canadian actor
- Quinn Mack (born 1965), American baseball player
- Quinn Marston (born 1988), American singer-songwriter and painter
- Quinn Martin (1922–1987), American television producer
- Quinn McColgan (born 2002), American actress
- Quinn McDowell (born 1990), American basketball player and coach
- Quinn G. McKay (born 1926), American missionary
- Quinn McNemar (1930–1986), American psychologist and statistician
- Quinn Meinerz (born 1998), American football player
- Quinn Mulhern (born 1984), American mixed martial artist
- Quinn Ngawati (born 1999), Canadian rugby union player
- Quinn Nordin (born 1998), American football player
- Quinn Norton (born 1973), American journalist
- Quinn O'Hara (1941–2017), Scottish-American actress
- Quinn Ojinnaka (born 1984), American football player and professional wrestler
- Quinn Paynter (born 1961), Bermudian boxer
- Quinn Pitcock (born 1983), American football player
- Quinn Porter (born 1986), American football player
- Quinn Priester (born 2000), American baseball player
- Quinn (born 1995), Canadian soccer player
- Quinn Redeker (1936–2022), American actor and screenwriter
- Quinn Roux (born 1990), South African-Irish rugby union player
- Quinn Sanders (born c. 1989), American football coach
- Quinn Schulte (born 2000), American football player
- Quinn Sharp (born 1989), American football player
- Quinn Shephard (born 1995), American actress
- Quinn Simmons (born 2001), American road cyclist
- Quinn Slobodian (born 1978), Canadian historian
- Quinn Smith (born 1991), Canadian football player
- Quinn Sullivan (born 1999), American blues-rock guitarist
- Quinn Sullivan (born 2004), American soccer player
- Quinn Sutton, American technology executive
- Quinn Sypniewski (born 1982), American football player
- Quinn Tamm (1910–1986), American law enforcement executive
- Quinn Tupaea (born 1999), New Zealand rugby union player
- Quinn Weng (born 1979), Taiwanese singer
- Quinn Wheeler (born 1974), Virgin Island bobsledder
- Quinn Wilder, Canadian romance novelist
- Quinn Wilson (1908–1978), American jazz bassist and tubist
- Quinn Wolcott (born 1986), American baseball umpire

== Fictional characters ==
- Quinn Fuller in the American Daytime Soap Opera The Bold and the Beautiful
- Quinn Fabray in the television series Glee
- Quinn Garvey in the television series How I Met Your Mother
- Quinn Mallory in the television series Sliders
- Quinn Morgendorffer in the television series Daria
- Quinn Pensky in the Nickelodeon live-action sitcom Zoey 101
- Quinn Perkins in the TV series Scandal
- Quinn the Eskimo in the song The Mighty Quinn
- Quinn the puffin, a recurring character in the British television programme 3rd & Bird
- Quinn (Prison Break character) in the American television series Prison Break

== See also ==
- Quinn (surname)
- O'Quinn, a surname
- Quin (disambiguation)
