= Boris Lipnitzki =

20th-century Ukrainian-born French photographer of the arts

Haim Efime Boris Lipnitzki (1887–1971) was a Russian Empire-born French photographer of the arts; ballet, fashion, cinema, visual art, writing and music.

== Biography ==
Haim Efime Boris Lipnitzki (or Lipnitzky) was born into a Jewish family in Oster, in the Chernigov Governorate of the Russian Empire (now Ukraine) on 4 February 1887. He died in Paris on 6 July 1971, aged 84, and is buried in Pere Lachaise cemetery.

== Photographer ==
Lipnitzki first worked for a photographer in Odessa, then opened his own studio in Pułtusk. He arrived in Paris in the early 1920s. There, he established a studio at 40 rue du Colisée, where he photographed many of the artistic personalities of the 20th century from the 1920s-1960s, as well as picturing them in their own surroundings. His friendship with fashion designer Paul Poiret, with whom he would stay to photograph in Biarritz, provided an entrée into these circles.

His subjects included Maurice Ravel, René Hubert, Albert Camus, Blaise Cendrars, Jean Cocteau, Otto Preminger, Igor Strawinsky, Arthur Honegger, Leonid Massine, Serge Lifar, Paul Poiret, Coco Chanel, Olga Spessivtseva, Nyota Inyoka, Tamara Karsavina, Serge Gainsbourg, Les Six, Marc Chagall, Pablo Picasso, as well as Josephine Baker of whom in 1926 he made a famous series of nude photographs.

Lipnitzki was a stills photographer on Gance's Napoléon and caught more informal views of crew and actors relaxing, his pictures being used on the covers of the programs and displayed in cinemas, but despite assurances, he was not given credit for them. A trial followed in the Seine tribunal and the producer of the film was ordered to pay 30,000 francs (about US$16000 in 2010) to Lipnitzki. The industry publication Le Photographe called attention to this as a precedent in French copyright law. He also recorded many major ballet performances and made studio portraits of dancers.

Photographs by Lipnitski were published in Femina, The Paris Times, Paris-Alger magazine, Les Modes, La Vie parisienne, Chantecler revue, Vogue (Paris), L'Atlantique, Paris-soir, La Femme de France, Être belle, Le Photographe, Le Point, Adam: revue des modes masculines en France et à l'étranger, Ambiance, Comoedia, Claudine, Le Monde illustré, L'Art musical, Bravo, Le Petit journal, Le Théâtre et Comœdia illustré and others.

In an article on the relative value of hand-drawn and photographic illustration, Robert Lang director/editor of Rester Jeune, describing the stylistic of various illustrators and photographers, writes of Lipnitzki that he "is fond of halos and his art parallels that of the theatre".

Lipnitzki's prodigious output was decimated when the Athenaeum theatre, where his friend Louis Jouvet had helped him hide his prints during the Occupation was flooded while he had fled to stay with his friend Chagall in New York .

== Post-war ==
After the war, he and his brothers established the Lipnitzki Studio which was in full production and by 1946 was advertising for staff, and operated until just before Lipnitzki died. In the mid-50s, his nephew Bernard Lipnitski joined the studio for three years, before being hired by weekly magazine France Dimanche, for which he photographed Céline Monsarrat, Françoise Sagan and Salvador Dalí, then was employed as a photojournalist by other French magazines. Boris Lipnitzki continued to agitate for copyright law in relation to professional photography and his opinion and participation was sought, amongst other instances, by the meeting of Commission des Droits d'Auteur of February 1945, and on other occasions.

== Legacy ==
In 1970, his collection—more than a million negatives and 600,000 prints—and that of his nephew, was bought by the Roger-Viollet agency. Attribution of images from the studio made 1945–1969 to a particular photographer amongst the brothers is not always certain.

== Publications ==
- Haim Efime Boris Lipnitzki (1952), Images de Louis Jouvet, Paris Emile-Paul frères
- Lipnitzki, Boris; Denoyelle, Françoise (2013), Boris Lipnitzki : le magnifique, Chaudun, ISBN 978-2-35039-140-3

== Solo exhibitions ==
- 2005, 7 May – 12 Jun: Boris Lipnitzki, Espace Saint-Jean, Melun

== Group exhibitions ==
- 2019–20, 26 Oct 2019 – 19 Jan: 1925 - 1935, Une décennie bouleversante (a decade of change), with Marcel Arthaud, Laure-Albin Guillot, Jean Moral, André Papillon, Gaston Paris & others, Musée Nicéphore Niépce, Chalon-sur-Saône
- 27 Nov 2013 – 31 Mar 2014: Biographical forms: Construction and individual mythology, with Brassaï, Günter Brus, Claude Cahun, Bruce Conner, VALIE EXPORT, Tomislav Gotovac, Raymond Hains, Santu Mofokeng, Nadar (Gaspard-Félix Tournachon), Henrik Olesen, Ahlam Shibli, Ed Templeton, Jeff Wall, Francesca Woodman, & others, Museo Nacional Centro de Arte Reina Sofia (MNCARS), Madrid
- 2011, 12 Nov – 29 Dec: Beispielhaft 3, with František Drtikol, Leo Fuchs, Charlotte March, Egbert Mittelstädt, Stefan Moses, Edward Quinn, Gerhard Riebicke, Valerie Schmidt, André Villers, Ira Vinokurova, KOELN-ART, Cologne
- 2011, 12 May – 16 Jul: Some Photographs taken in France, with Berenice Abbott, Eugène Atget, Denise Bellon, Ilse Bing, Erwin Blumenfeld, Brassaï, Henri Cartier-Bresson, André Adolphe-Eugène Disdéri, Louis-Emile Durandelle, Martin Kollar, Germaine Krull, Henri Le Secq, Man Ray, Willy Ronis, Raoul Ubac, & others, Diemar/Noble Photography, London
- 2008, 5 Apr – 1 Jun: CONTROVERSIES, with Annelies Štrba, Abbas, Ladislav Bielik, Guy Bourdin, Robert Capa, Lewis Carroll, Henri Cartier-Bresson, Larry Clark, Luc Delahaye, Robert Doisneau, Horst Faas, Frank Fournier, Marc Garanger, Gary Gross, Lewis Hine, Rip Hopkins, Irina Ionesco, Yevgeny Khaldei (Chaldej), Lehnert & Landrock, Michael Light, Man Ray, Edward Mapplethorpe, Steven Meisel, Nadar (Gaspard-Félix Tournachon), Sebastião Salgado, Andres Serrano, Jock Sturges, Oliviero Toscani, Nick Ut, & others, Musée de l'Elysée, Lausanne
- 2005, 10 Feb – 20 Apr: Talking Pictures, with Peter Galadzhev, Lotte Jacobi, Germaine Krull, Fritz Lang, Man Ray, Raymond Voinquel, & others, Galerie Berinson, Berlin
- 1984, 15 June – 1 September: Hommage à Claire Croiza, Bibliothèque nationale, Music departement
- 1978, 17 June – 1 October: André Barsacq : cinquante ans de théâtre, Bibliothèque nationale, Paris
- 1964, 11 June–11 July: Guy Ropartz, Bibliothèque nationale
- 1961–1962, December–March: Louis Jouvet : exposition organisée pour le dixième anniversaire de sa mort
- 1957–1958, 19 December–28 February, Gustave Flaubert et Madame Bovary: exhibition organised for the centenary of the publication of the novel, Paris, Bibliothèque nationale
- 1930 27 Feb – 9 Mar: 7th Exposition de la Photographie et du Cinéma, with Genia Reinberg, Germaine Douazi, Vallois, Wilfrid Sketch, Pierre Petit, Nadar, Charles Martin, Lemonnier, Charles Gerschel, Duvivier, Charles Rouget. Parc des Expositions, Porte de Versailles

== Collections ==
- Musée Niepce
- Bibliothèque nationale de France
