= Edward Quin =

Edward Quin may refer to:

- Edward Quin (journalist)
- Edward Quin (pastoralist)

== See also ==
- Edward Quinn, Irish photographer
- Edward W. Quinn, mayor of Cambridge, Massachusetts
