= Wyndham-Quin =

Wyndham-Quin is a surname, and may refer to:

- Edwin Wyndham-Quin, 3rd Earl of Dunraven and Mount-Earl (1812–1871), British Peer
- Richard Wyndham-Quin, 6th Earl of Dunraven (1887–1965), Irish Peer
- Thady Wyndham-Quin, 7th Earl of Dunraven and Mount-Earl (1939–2011), Earl in the Peerage of Ireland
- Windham Wyndham-Quin (disambiguation), several people

== See also ==
- Quin (disambiguation)
- Wyndham
