= List of Harlequin Romance novels released in 1986 =

This is a list of Harlequin Romance novels released in 1986. (Main index: List of Harlequin Romance novels)

== Releases ==
Number	Title	Author	Date	Citations
# 2737	Return To Wallaby Creek	Kerry Allyne	January 1986	
# 2738	To Cage A Whirlwind	Jane Donnelly	January 1986	
# 2739	The Trouble With Bridges	Emma Goldrick	January 1986	
# 2740	Air Of Enchantment	Sarah Keene	January 1986	
# 2741	Magic In Vienna	Betty Neels	January 1986	
# 2742	Wild Jasmine	Yvonne Whittal	January 1986	
# 2743	Cartier's Strike	Jane Corrie	February 1986	
# 2744	Quiet Lightning	Tracy Hughes	February 1986	
# 2745	Night Of The Beguine	Roumelia Lane	February 1986	
# 2746	A Lake In Kyoto	Marjorie Lewty	February 1986	
# 2747	Valley Of The Snows	Jean S. MacLeod	February 1986	
# 2748	Come Next Summer	Leigh Michaels	February 1986	
# 2749	A Matter Of Marnie	Rosemary Badger	March 1986	
# 2750	The Perfect Choice	Melissa Forsythe	March 1986	
# 2751	Safe Harbour	Rosalie Henaghan	March 1986	
# 2752	Never The Time And The Place	Betty Neels	March 1986	
# 2753	A Will To Love	Edwina Shore	March 1986	
# 2754	He Was The Stranger	Sheila Strutt	March 1986	
# 2755	Cinderella Wife	Katherine Arthur	April 1986	
# 2756	Girl Of Mystery	Mons Daveson	April 1986	
# 2757	Aegean Enchantment	Emily Francis	April 1986	
# 2758	Hunger	Rowan Kirby	April 1986	
# 2759	Pagan Gold	Margaret Rome	April 1986	
# 2760	Sky High	Nicola West	April 1986	
# 2761	Stranger In Town	Kerry Allyne	May 1986	
# 2762	The Driftwood Dragon	Ann Charlton	May 1986	
# 2763	Vows Of The Heart	Susan Fox	May 1986	
# 2764	Amaryllis Dreaming	Samantha Harvey	May 1986	
# 2765	Ask Me No Questions	Valerie Parv	May 1986	
# 2766	To Bring You Joy	Essie Summers	May 1986	
# 2767	Secret Lover	Kathryn Cranmer	June 1986	
# 2768	The Matchmakers	Debbie Macomber	June 1986	
# 2769	Wildfire	Alexandra Scott	June 1986	
# 2770	Song Without Words	Betsy Warren	June 1986	
# 2771	Comeback	Nicola West	June 1986	
# 2772	That Man from Texas	Quinn Wilder	June 1986	
# 2773	Shadows Of Eden	Rosemary Badger	July 1986	
# 2774	Sand Castles	Meg Dominique	July 1986	
# 2775	Age Of Consent	Victoria Gordon	July 1986	
# 2776	Power Point	Rowan Kirby	July 1986	
# 2777	Bluebells On The Hill	Barbara McMahon	July 1986	
# 2778	Return To Faraway	Valerie Parv	July 1986	
# 2779	Only A Woman	Bethany Campbell	August 1986	
# 2780	A Fool To Say Yes	Sandra Clark	August 1986	
# 2781	The Right Time	Maura McGiveny	August 1986	
# 2782	The Plumed Serpent	Annabel Murray	August 1986	
# 2783	Game Of Hazard	Kate Walker	August 1986	
# 2784	The Tiger's Cage	Margaret Way	August 1986	
# 2785	Some Say Love	Lindsay Armstrong	September 1986	
# 2786	Prisoner Of Shadow Mountain	Mariel Kirk	September 1986	
# 2787	A Girl Named Rose	Betty Neels	September 1986	
# 2788	Heartbreak Plains	Valerie Parv	September 1986	
# 2789	Misleading Encounter	Jessica Steele	September 1986	
# 2790	Sweet Poison	Angela Wells	September 1986	
# 2791	Hunter's Snare	Emily Ruth Edwards	October 1986	
# 2792	Impressions	Tracy Hughes	October 1986	
# 2793	Separate Lives	Carolyn Jantz	October 1986	
# 2794	Call Of The Mountain	Miriam MacGregor	October 1986	
# 2795	Impulsive Challenge	Margaret Mayo	October 1986	
# 2796	Safari Heartbreak	Gwen Westwood	October 1986	
# 2797	Boss Of Yarrakina	Valerie Parv	November 1986	
# 2798	The Last Barrier	Edwina Shore	November 1986	
# 2799	One Life At A Time	Natalie Spark	November 1986	
# 2800	So Near, So Far	Jessica Steele	November 1986	
# 2801	Autumn In	Essie Summers	November 1986	
# 2802	Breaking Free	Marcella Thompson	November 1986	
# 2803	A Thousand Roses	Bethany Campbell	December 1986	
# 2804	The Heron Quest	Charlotte Lamb	December 1986	
# 2805	At Daggers Drawn	Margaret Mayo	December 1986	
# 2806	Capture A Shadow	Leigh Michaels	December 1986	
# 2807	The Waiting Man	Jeneth Murrey	December 1986	
# 2808	Two Weeks To Remember	Betty Neels	December 1986	
