= Quinn =

Quinn may refer to:

== People ==
- Quinn (soccer) (born 1995), Canadian soccer player and Olympic gold medalist
- Quinn (given name)
- Quinn (surname)
- Quinn (musician) (born 2004), American musician

== Places in the United States ==
- Quinn, Kentucky, an unincorporated community
- Quinn, Michigan, a ghost town
- Quinn, Missouri, an unincorporated community
- Quinn, South Dakota, a town
- Quinn River, Nevada

== Houses ==
- Quinn House, San Francisco
- A. V. Quinn House, Evanston, Wyoming
- Masten-Quinn House, Wurtsboro, New York
- Quin House, nickname for Algonquin Club, Boston, Massachusetts

== Other uses ==
- Quinn, an album by Quinn
- Quinn (app), an audio erotica app and website
- Mannok, formerly the Quinn Group, a business group in Northern Ireland
- Quinn Industrial Holdings, a building products enterprise composed of two businesses formerly in the Quinn Group
- Quinn School of Business, at University College Dublin, Ireland
- "Quinn the Eskimo (Mighty Quinn)", a song written by Bob Dylan and first released by Manfred Mann
- A Band Called Quinn

== See also ==
- Quin (disambiguation)
- Quinns (disambiguation)
- Harley Quinn (disambiguation)
