= Quincy Davis =

Quincy Davis may refer to:

- Quincy Davis (basketball) (born 1983), American-born Taiwanese basketball player
- Quincy Davis (musician) (born 1977), American drummer
- Quincy Davis (surfer) (born 1995), American surfer
