= Quin =

Quin may refer to:

- Quin (name), including a list of people with the name
- Quiñ, American singer Bianca Quiñones
- Quin (Sigilverse), a fictional planet
- Quin, County Clare, a village in County Clare, Ireland
- The Quin House, nickname for Algonquin Club, Boston, Massachusetts
- QUIN, or Quinolinic acid, a dicarboxylic acid with a pyridine backbone
- Quin-, a numeral prefix meaning "five"

== See also ==
- O'Quin
- Port Quin
- Quin Rose, Japanese video game development company
- Quin-Harkin
- Quinn (disambiguation)
- River Quin
- Wyndham-Quin
