= Quins =

Quins may refer to:

Quins is the nickname of two rugby teams who play under the name Harlequins and play their home games at the Twickenham Stoop:

- Harlequins RL, a rugby league team
- Harlequin F.C., a rugby union team

It may also refer to:

- Quintuplet quins is short for quintuplets meaning 5 in number as in multiple birth
- Quintuplets is a sitcom that aired twenty-two episodes on FOX from June 16, 2004, through January 12, 2005
- Quintuplets 2000 is episode 52 in the fourth season of the Comedy Central series South Park

Places

- Quins, Aveyron, a commune of France in the Aveyron department

== See also ==
- Quinns (disambiguation)
