= Steiner, Michigan =

- Ghost town
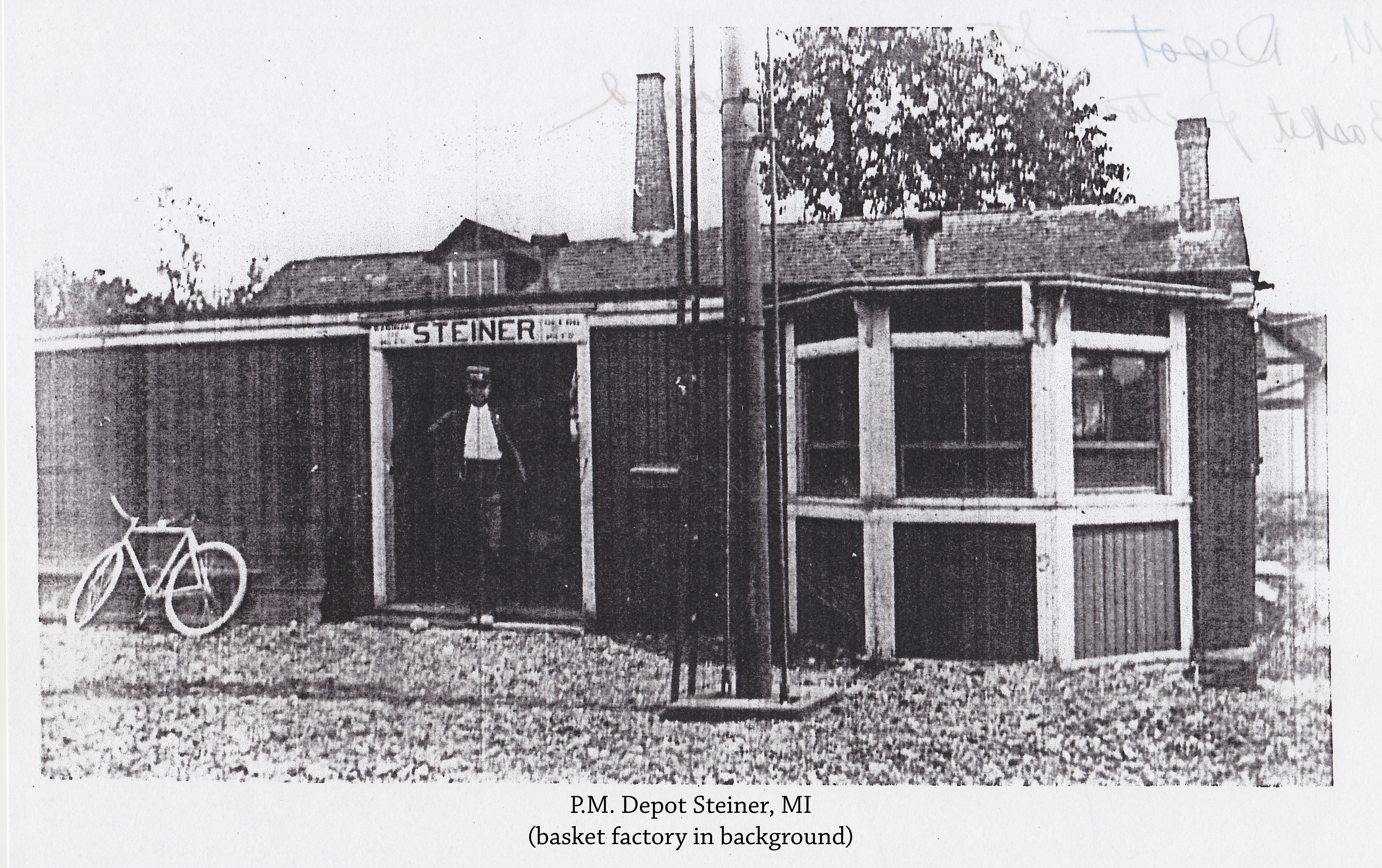
- Steiner Depot, Pere Marquette Railroad

- Location within the state of Michigan Location within the United States
- Coordinates: 41°59′20″N 83°23′15″W
- Country: United States
- State: Michigan
- County: Monroe
- Township: Frenchtown
- Founded: 1873
- Elevation: 617 ft (188 m)
- Time zone: UTC-5 (Eastern (EST))
  - Summer (DST): UTC-4 (EDT)
- GNIS feature ID: 638786

Steiner was a small farming settlement in what is now Frenchtown Charter Township, Monroe County in the U.S. state of Michigan. The village no longer exists but some structures remain and are in use. It was situated at the intersection of Steiner Road and Laduke Road near the current CSX Railroad crossing.

The village of Steiner was located about five miles north of Monroe, and was centered around the Steiner Depot of the Pere Marquette Railroad.

Steiner was founded by and named for William Steiner in 1873. At one time the town had a railroad depot, creamery, granary, freight scales, a sawmill, basket factory, pottery and brick works, a saloon (the Steiner Inn), the Laduke general store and the Steiner Post Office. The post office opened on September 7, 1886 with John Kohler as the first postmaster, and closed on July 31, 1925. For some years, the railroad maintained a spur extending west from a siding in Steiner to a sand quarry near Maybee.

The general store and other structures, located between Laduke Road and the railroad tracks, were destroyed in a fire on May 3, 1948. An elderly woman, Margaret Gibson, age 70 and Magadline Moyer, age 5 perished in the fire. There was a significant delay in the arrival of rescuers, as the closest fire department was located in Monroe.

Few obvious signs remain of the town except a cluster of several pre-1900 houses, the basket factory building near the railroad tracks, and the road name. Steiner is now one of the ghost towns of Michigan.

== Gallery ==
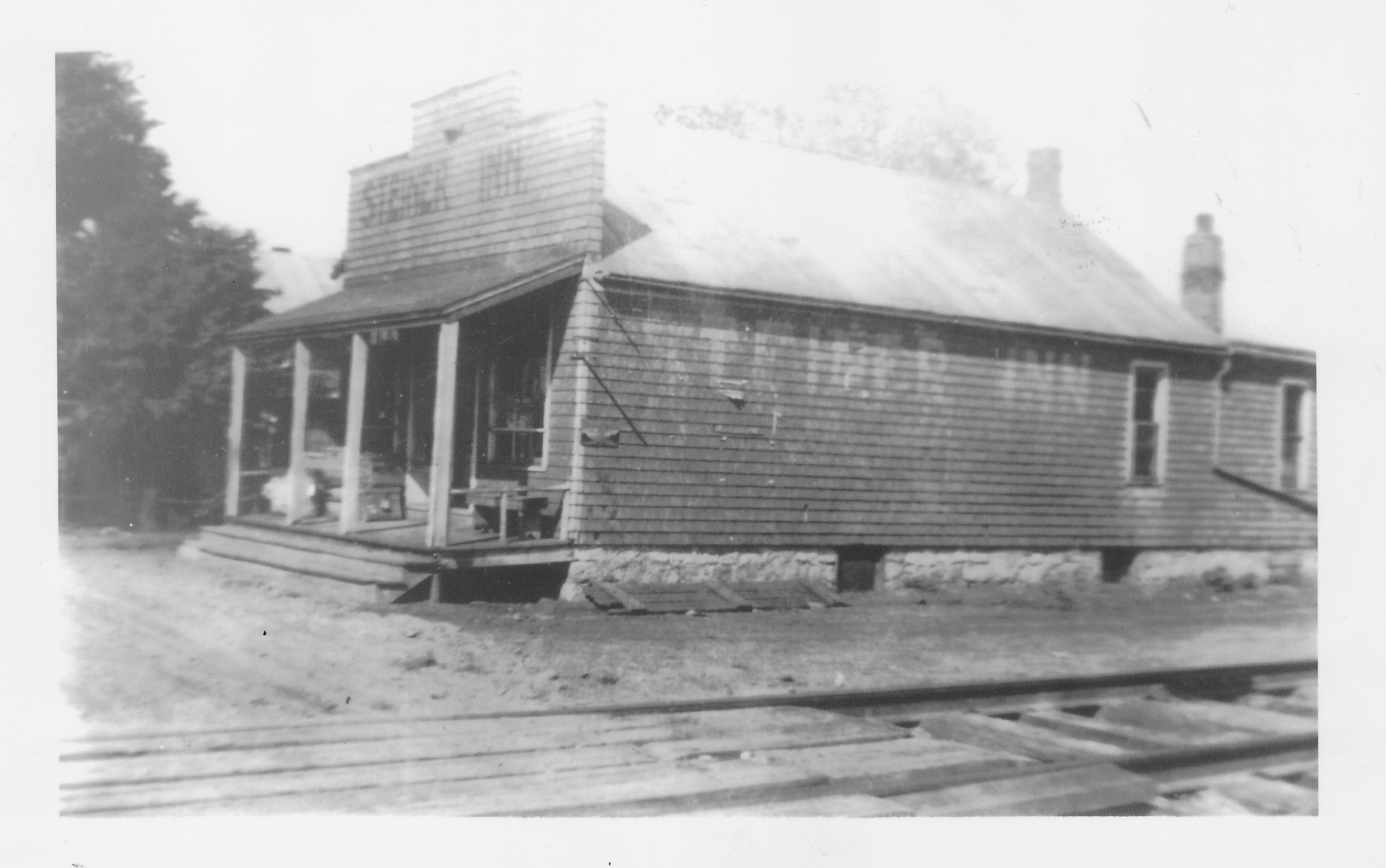
Steiner Inn

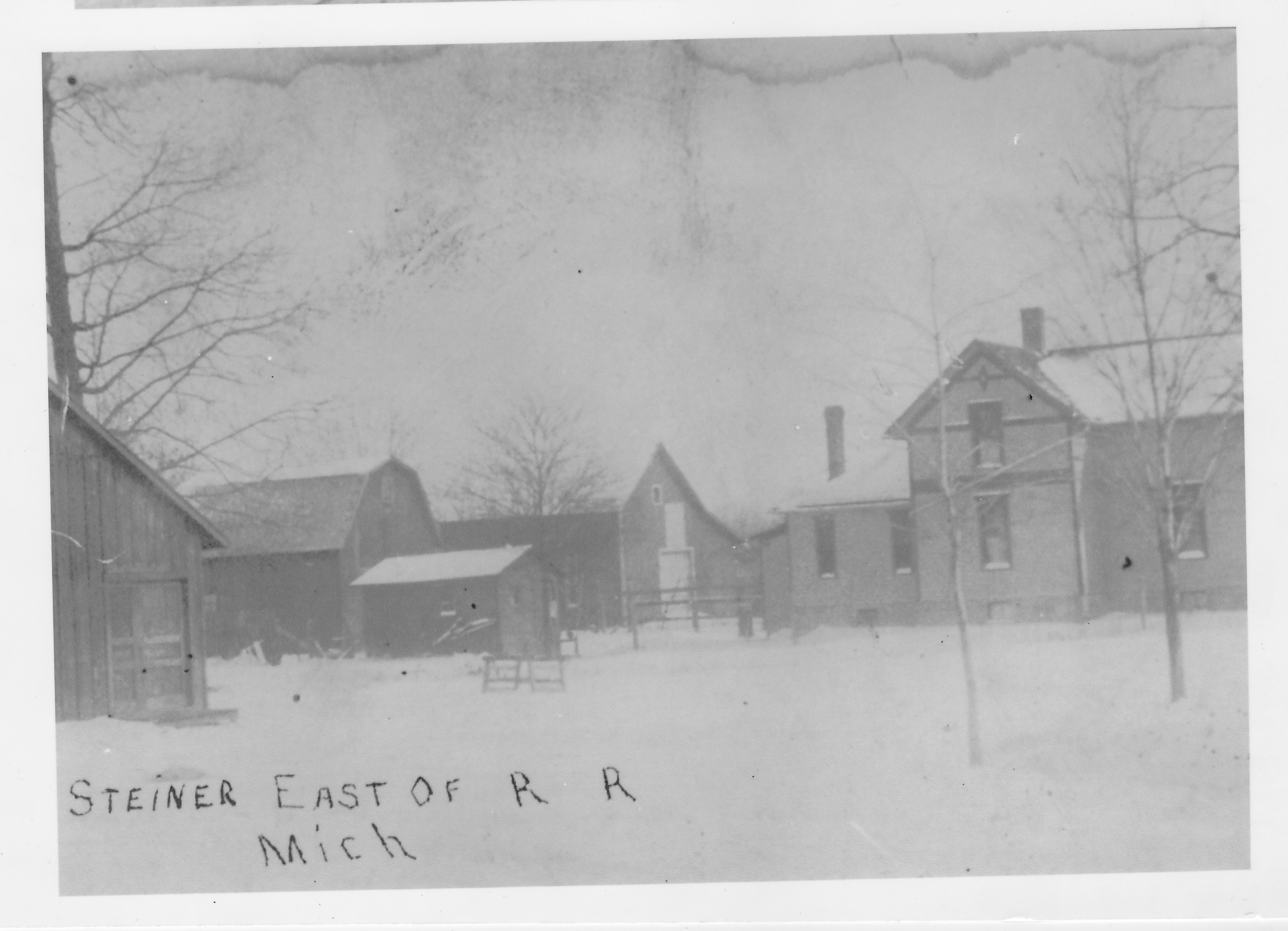
Steiner facing east from railroad

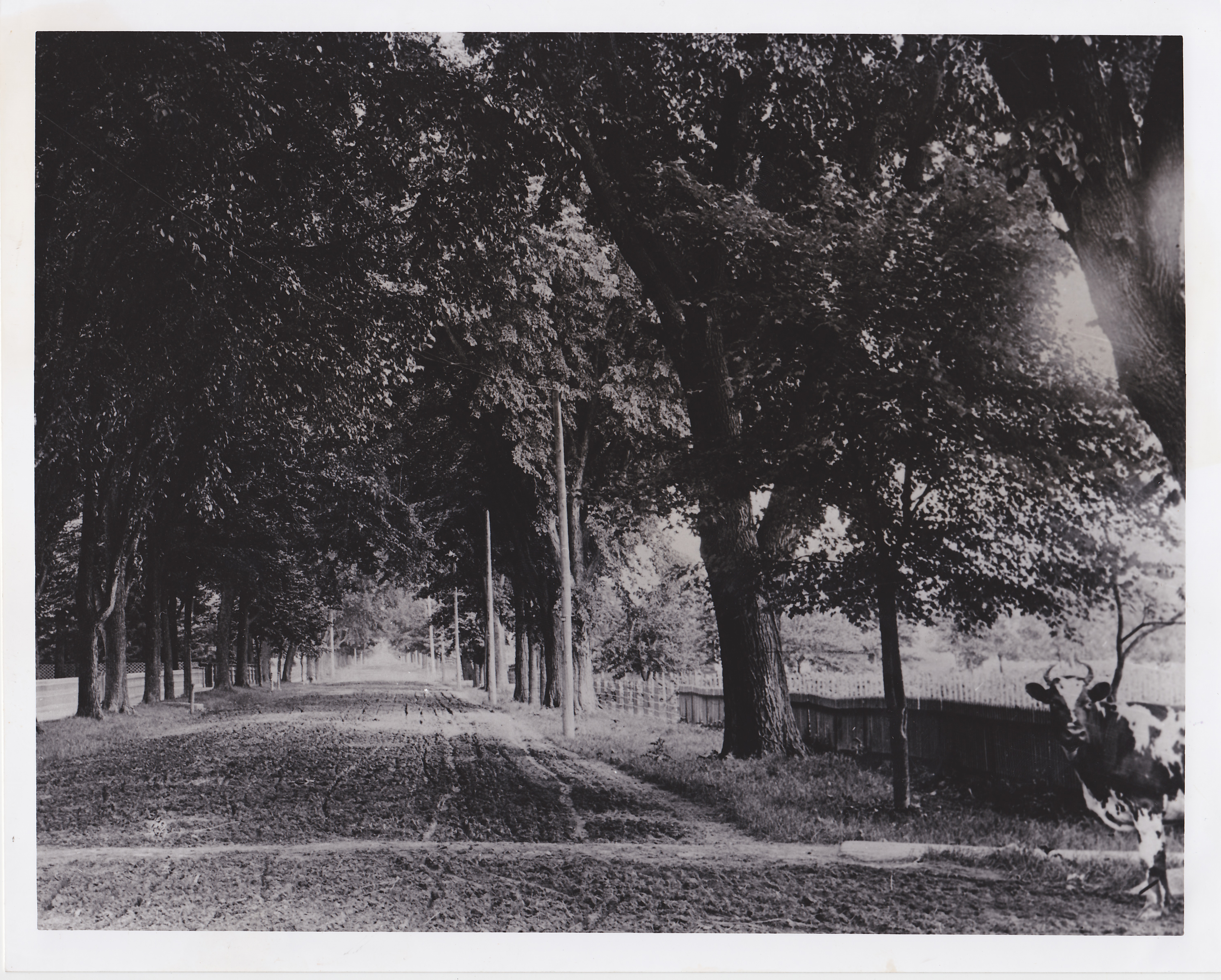
Steiner facing east from railroad towards picnic grounds

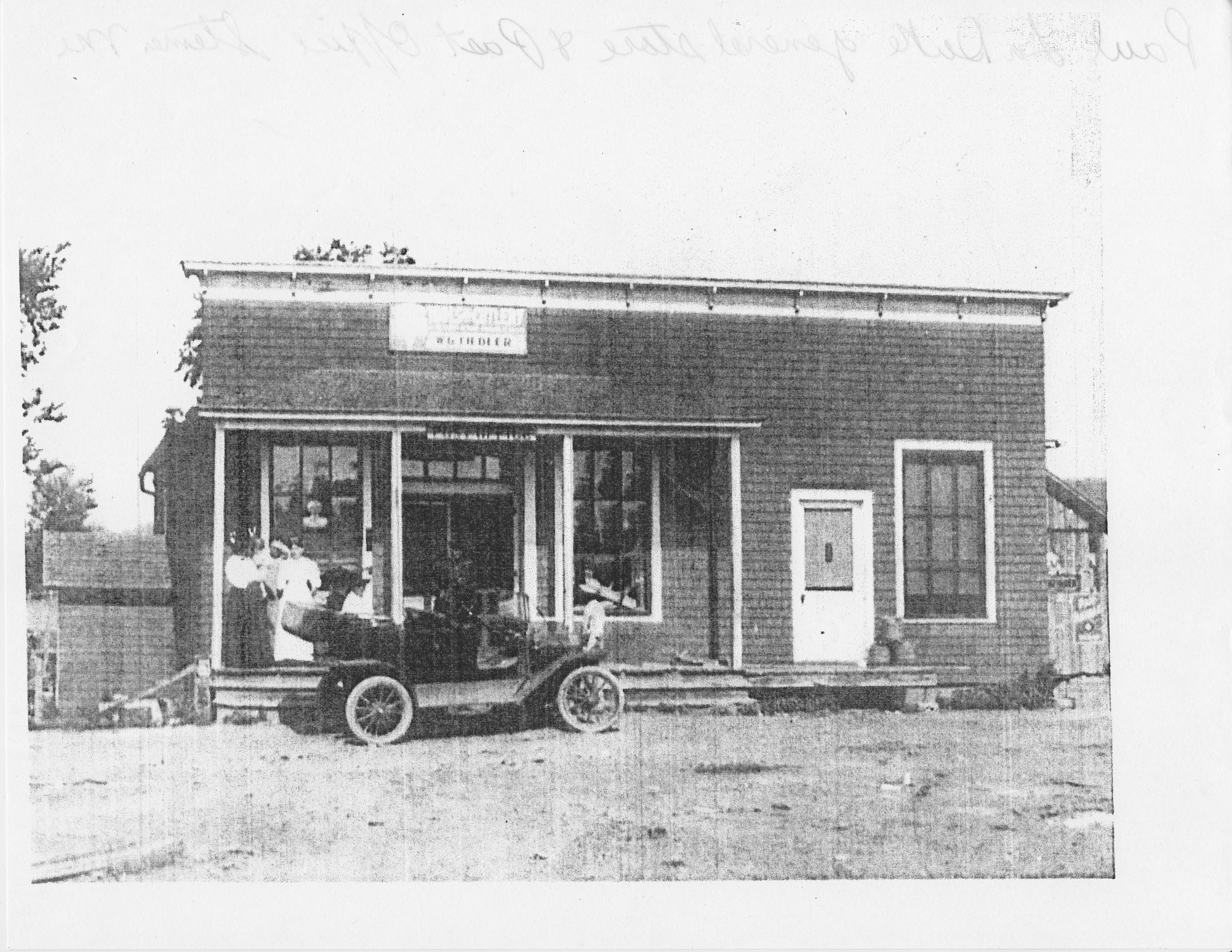
Paul Laduke Store

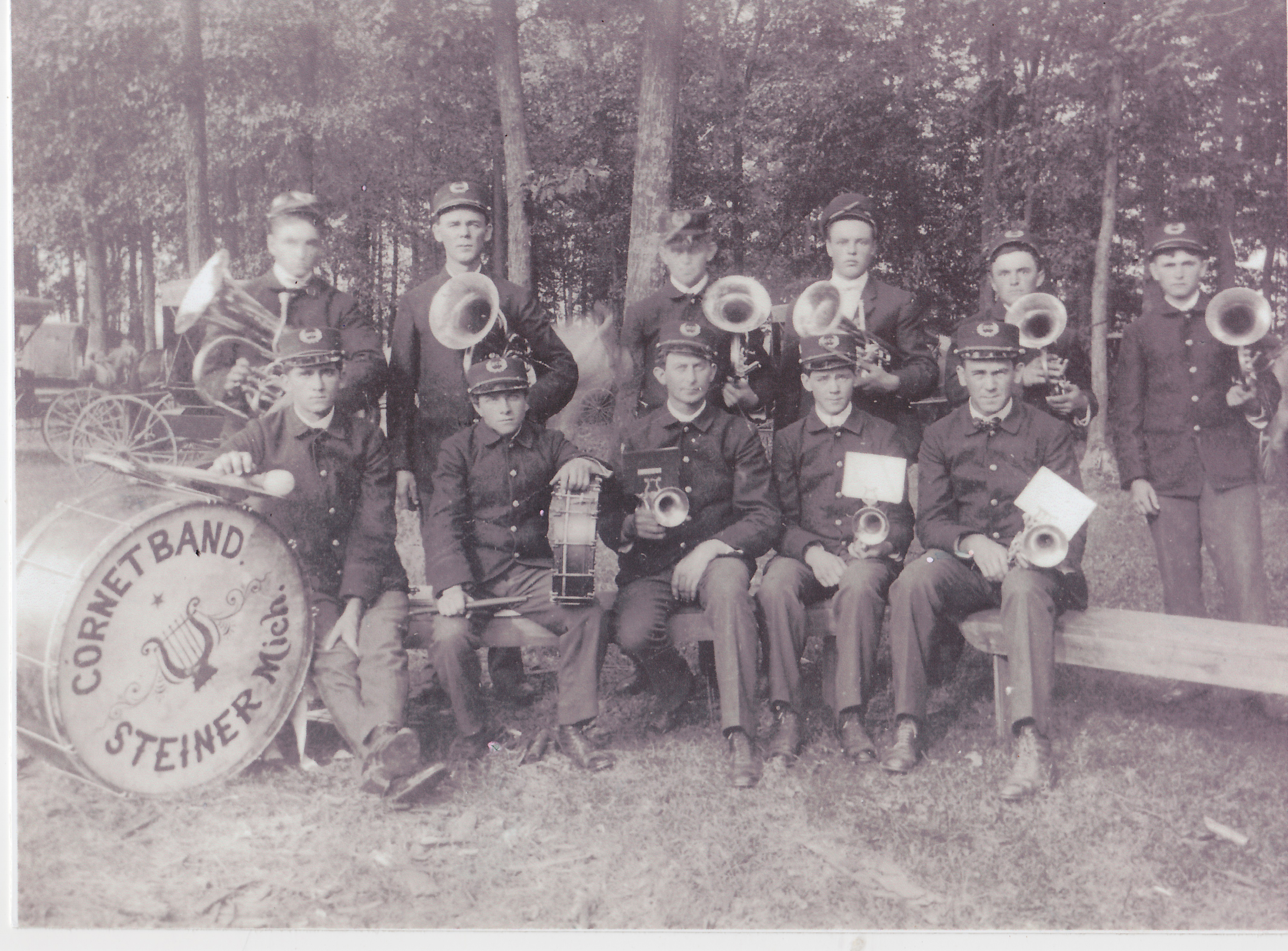
Steiner Cornet Band c. 1905

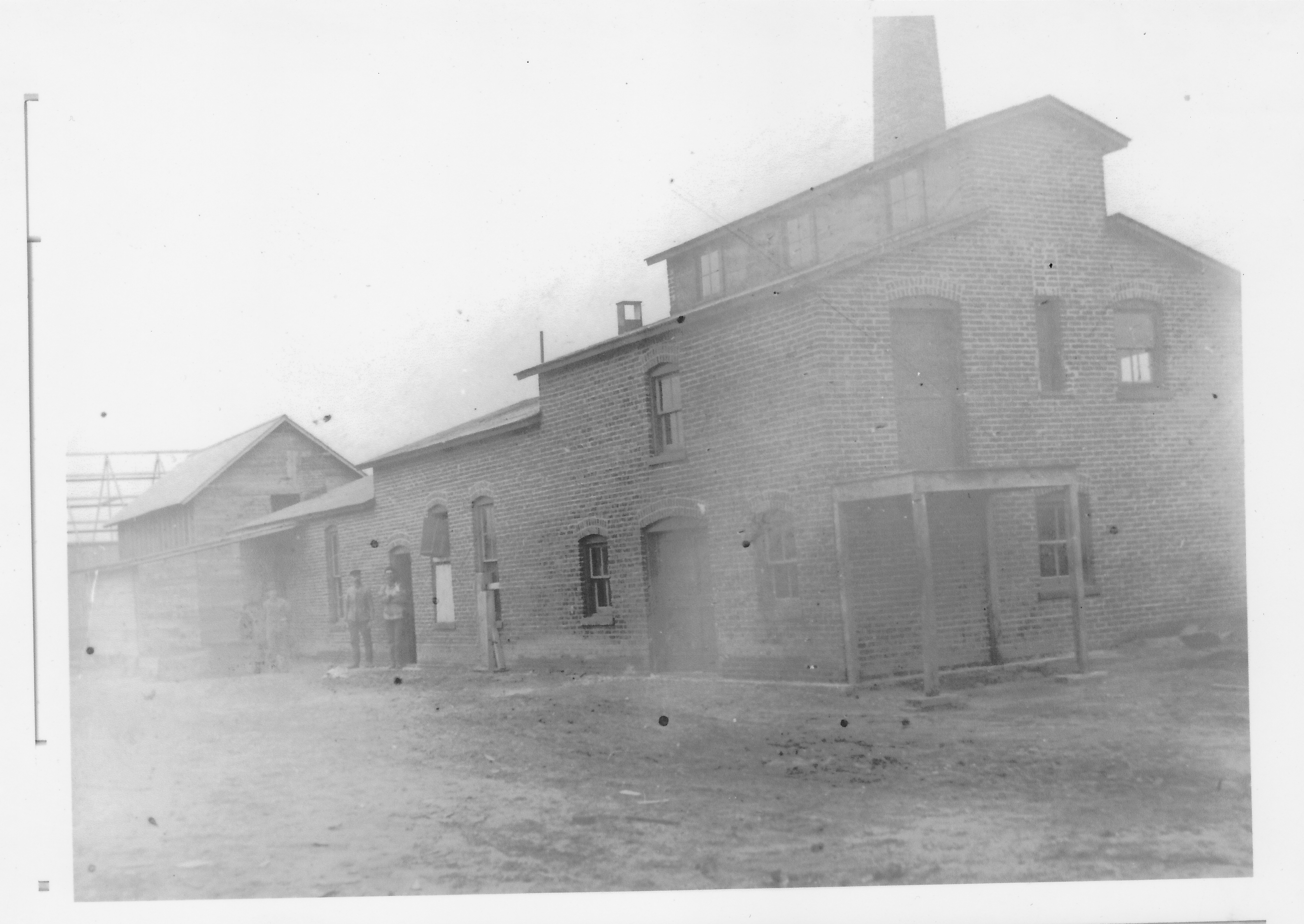
Block Factory

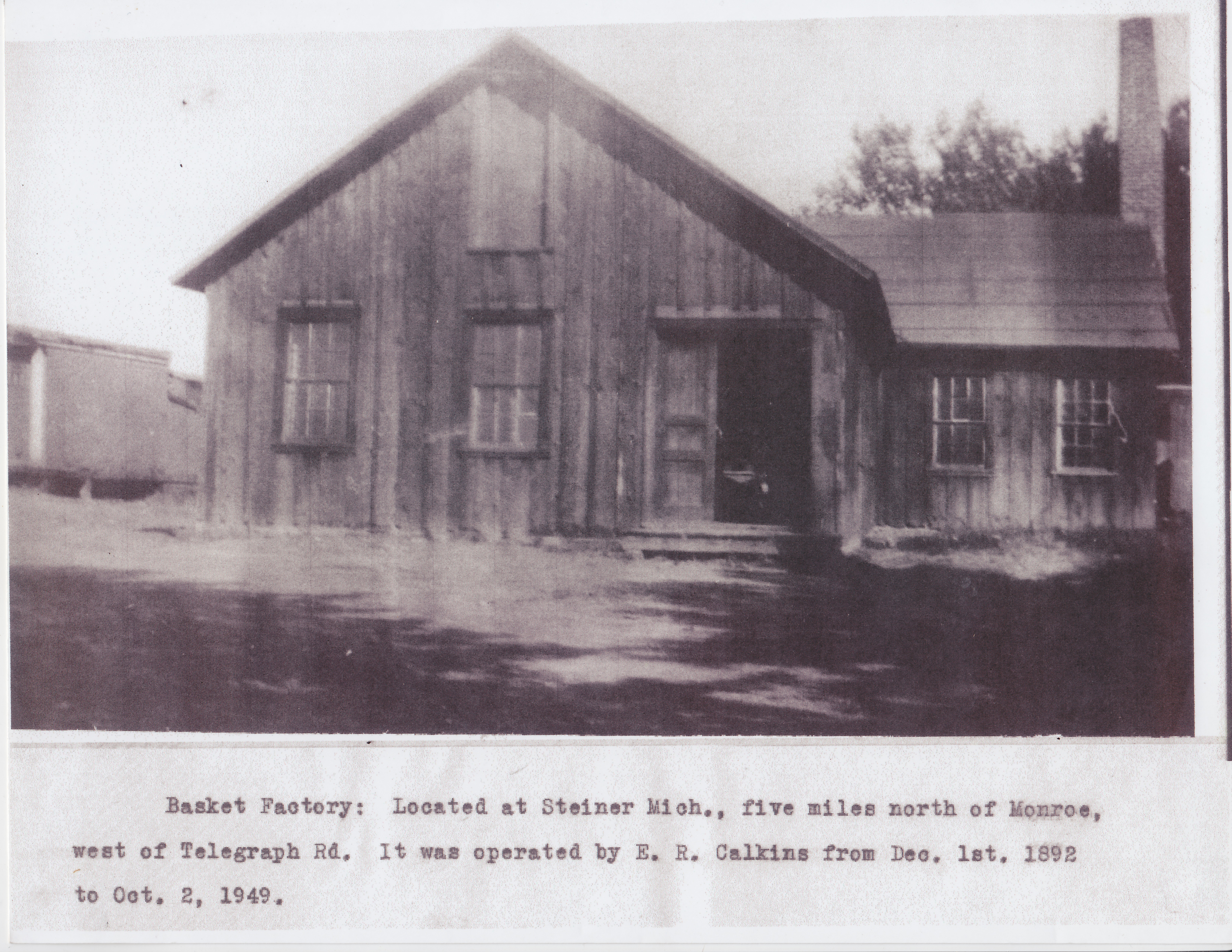
Calkins Basket Factory, which still remains Steiner

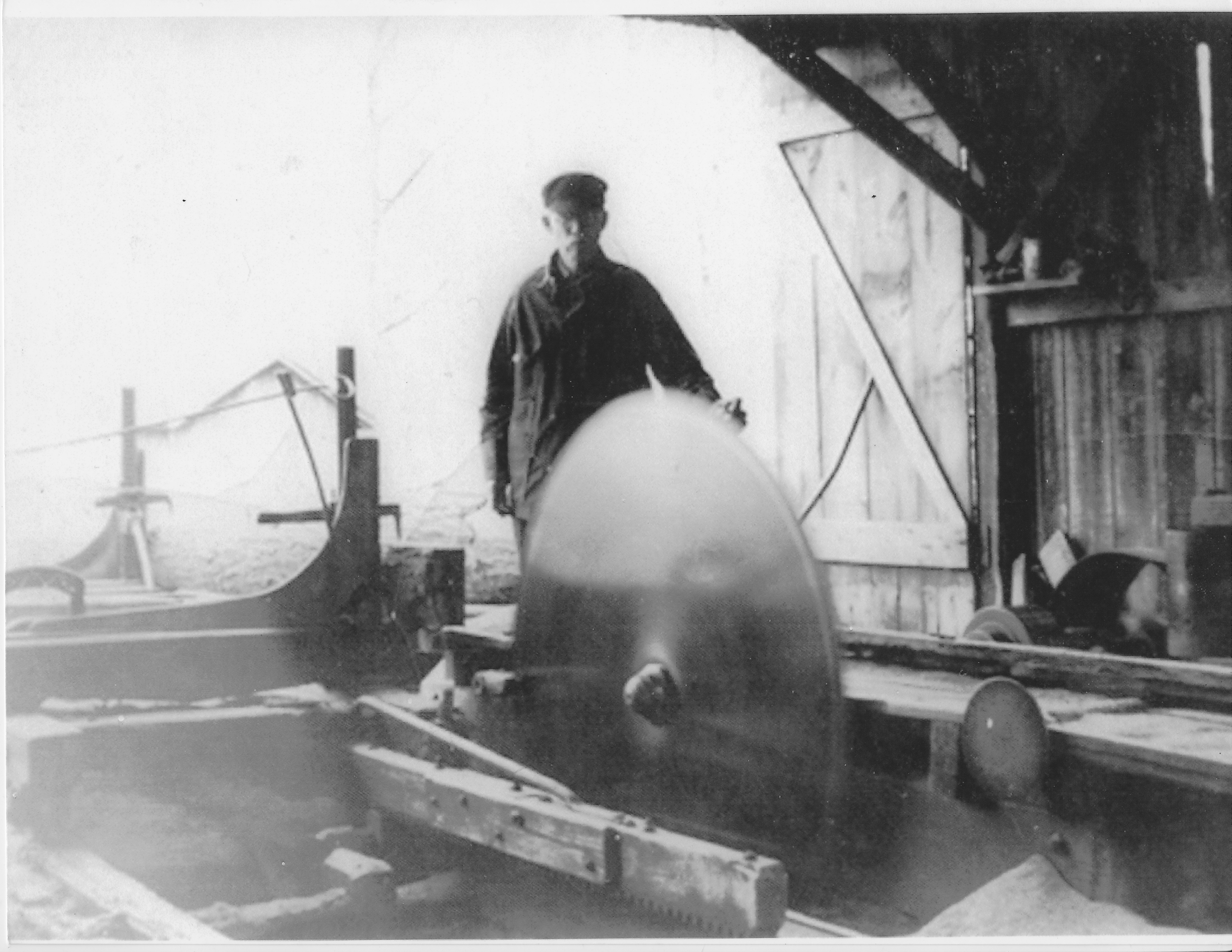
E. R. Calkins operating sawmill
