= Quin (name) =

Quin is a given name. It is often short for Quinlan.

Notable people with the name include:

== Given name ==
- Quin Blanding (born 1996), American football player
- Quin Epperly (1913–2001), American racing car constructor
- Quin Hillyer (born 1964), American newspaper columnist and writer
- Quin Houff (born 1997), American professional racing driver
- Quin Ivy (born 1937), American former disc jockey
- Quin Kruijsen (born 1990), Dutch footballer
- Quin Monson (born 1969), American associate professor of social science at Brigham Young University
- Quin Snyder (born 1966), American basketball coach

== Surname ==
- Andy Quin (born 1960), composer and jazz pianist
- Ann Quin (1936–1973), British writer
- Barry Quin (21st century), British-born actor
- Betty Quin (21st century), Australian script writer
- Edward Quin (journalist) (died 1823), Irish journalist
- Edward Quin (cartographer) (1794–1828), his son, cartographer
- Edward Quin (pastoralist) (died 1922), New South Wales politician
- Edwin Wyndham-Quin, 3rd Earl of Dunraven and Mount-Earl (1812–1871), 1st Baron Kenry, politician
- Francisco Quin Yat (died 2012), Guatemalan farmer shot in Belize
- Frederic Hervey Foster Quin (1799–1878), the first homeopathic physician in England
- Huston Quin (1876–1938), mayor of Louisville, Kentucky
- James Quin (1693–1766), English actor
- Jesse Quin (born 1981), English musician
- Joyce Quin, Baroness Quin (born 1944), Labour Party politician in the United Kingdom
- Liza Quin (born 1982), Cuban-American artist
- Mary Quin, American businesswoman
- Michael Joseph Quin (1796–1843), Irish author, journalist and editor
- Percy Quin (1872–1932), American politician
- Rebecca Quin (born 1987), Irish professional wrestler currently signed to WWE under the ring name Becky Lynch
- Sara Quin (born 1980), Canadian musician
- Tegan Quin (born 1980), Canadian musician
- Valentine Quin, 1st Earl of Dunraven and Mount-Earl (1752–1824), Earl in the Peerage of Ireland
- Vanessa Quin (born 1976), world champion BMX and downhill rider from New Zealand
- Walter Quin (1575?-1640), poet and royal tutor of Charles I of England
- William Quin (c. 1836–1880), plasterer and politician in South Australia
- Windham Quin, 2nd Earl of Dunraven and Mount-Earl (1782–1850), member of the United Kingdom Parliament

== Fictional characters ==
- Dugall Quin, a character in the folk ballad Dugall Quin
- Mr. Quin, a character in the short story collection The Mysterious Mr. Quin

== See also ==
- Qin (surname)
- Quinn (disambiguation)
- Quinn (given name)
- Quinn (surname)
