= Quinns =

Quinns or Quinn's may refer to:

- Quinns Rocks, Western Australia, a suburb of Perth
- Quinn's Post Commonwealth War Graves Commission Cemetery, near Gallipoli, Turkey

== See also ==
- Quins (disambiguation)
- Quinn (disambiguation)
