= Quinn Sutton =

American businessman

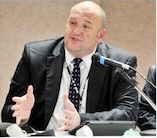
- Sutton on UN Panel at RIO+20 in 2012
- Born: United States
- Education: Brigham Young University, Pepperdine University, L'institut de Gestion Sociale
- Occupations: Business professional, educator
- Known for: Education Policy and advocate for digital inclusion

Quinn Sutton Quinn Sutton is an American technology executive, educator, and advocate for digital inclusion. He is the co-founder and executive director of the Digital Alliance Foundation, a nonprofit organization that focuses on bridging the digital divide and promoting access to information and communications technology (ICT) for underserved populations worldwide.

== Early life and education ==
Sutton earned a Bachelor of Arts in International Relations from Brigham Young University. He later completed an MBA at Pepperdine University and a Master's degree in International Business from Institut de Gestion Sociale in Paris, France.

== Career ==
In 2007, Sutton co-founded the Digital Alliance Foundation with the aim of using ICT to promote education, workforce development, and social inclusion. The foundation has worked internationally with governments, businesses, and NGOs on projects relating to ICT training and education for marginalized communities

Sutton has represented the organization at multiple United Nations events, including the World Summit on the Information Society (WSIS) and the Global Alliance for ICT and Development (UN-GAID), where he has spoken on the role of public–private partnerships in expanding access to technology.

Through his leadership at the foundation, Sutton has contributed to policy discussions around ICT for development (ICT4D), workforce readiness, and education in the digital age.

== International work ==
Some of his international engagement includes:

- Serving on advisory roles related to the UN's Global Alliance for ICT and Development (UNGAID)
- Participating on panels in forums such as the World Summit on the Information Society (WSIS)
- Working on education policy frameworks around ICT for development and "education for all in the digital age"
