= Quincy Wilson =

Quincy Wilson may refer to:

- Quincy Wilson (running back) (born 1981), former NFL running back
- Quincy Wilson (cornerback) (born 1996), NFL cornerback for the New York Giants
- Quincy Wilson (runner) (born 2008), American track and field athlete
