= O'Quinn =

O'Quinn is a surname. Notable people with the surname include:

- Danny O'Quinn, American professional stock car racer
- John O'Quinn, American lawyer
- John O'Quinn (football), American football player
- Kyle O'Quinn, American professional basketball player
- Terry O'Quinn, American actor

== See also ==
- O'Quinn, Texas, unincorporated community
