= Crescent, Michigan =

- Ghost town
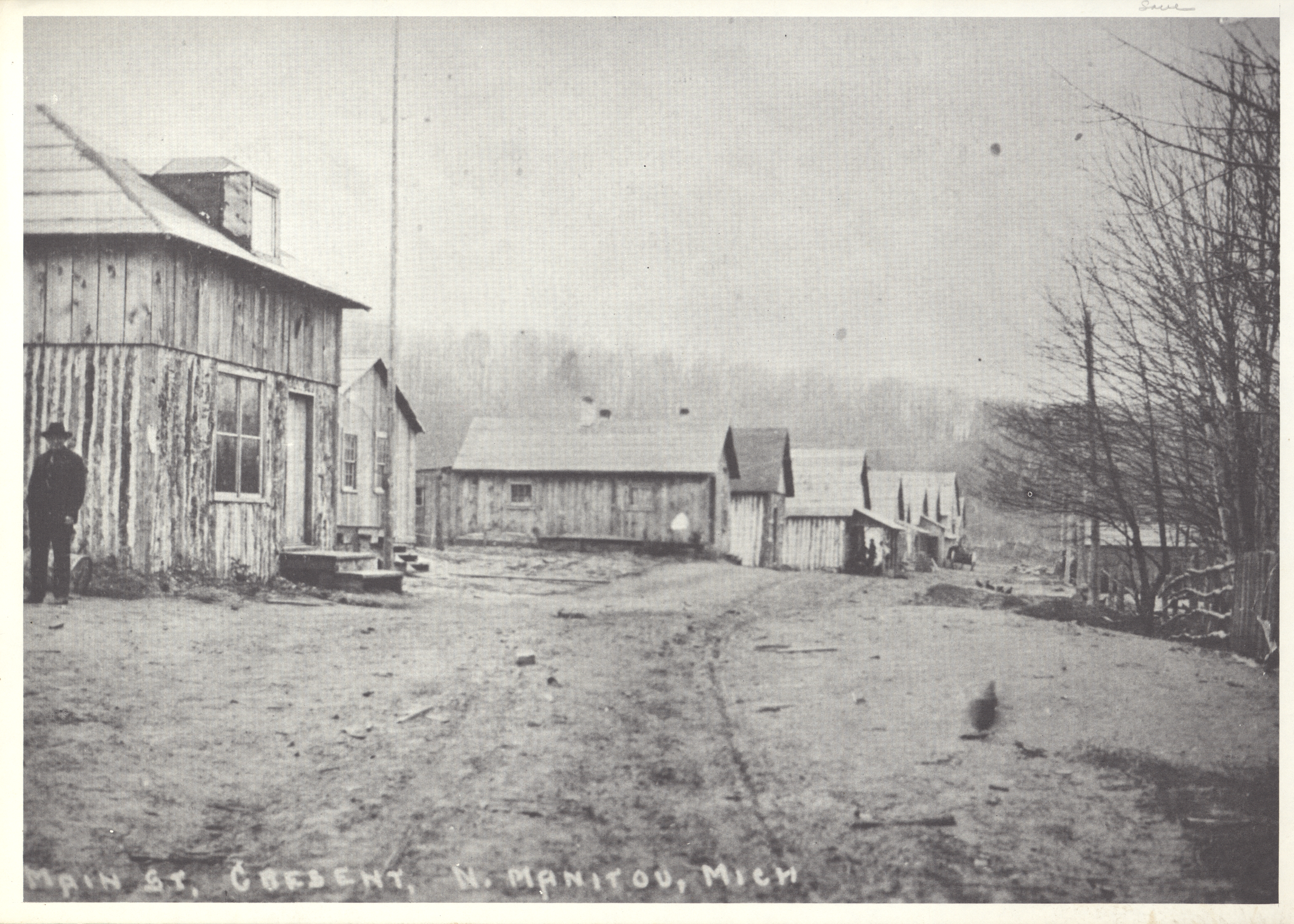
- Historic picture of the main street in the settlement of Crescent

- Location in the state of Michigan Crescent (the United States)
- Coordinates: 45°7′1.848″N 86°3′19″W
- Country: United States
- State: Michigan
- County: Leelanau
- Settled: 1860s
- Founded: 1906
- Abandoned: 1930s
- Named after: Shape of harbor
- Elevation: 630 ft (192 m)

Population (2022)
  - Total: 0
- Time zone: EST

Crescent is a ghost town located on the west shore of North Manitou Island off the Leelanau Peninsula, in Leelanau County, Michigan. The small town was first settled in the 1860s with the arrival of logging and farming industries and European immigrants, reaching its heyday in the early 1900s with the peak of the logging industry on the island. After the mills shut down in 1917, the town was abandoned with the island as a whole pivoting away from industry towards small scale tourism.

Buildings and other remnants of the town were torn down over the years, with the few remaining buildings currently under the purview of the National Park Service as part of Sleeping Bear Dunes National Lakeshore after the purchase of the island in 1983. Today, the ghost town is accessible via trails on the island reachable by ferry from Leland.

== History ==
=== Early history ===
The area that eventually became Crescent was first populated in the late 1860s with the construction of a dock in the natural bay, used mostly for supplying timber as fuel for passing ships as well as farm exports from the island. However, this first settlement was abandoned soon after the closure of the first dock in 1873. Interest in the site was rekindled in the 1880s as the west side of the island was more hospitable to a harbor and dock, with a second dock built sometime in the late 1880s or early 1890s. This second dock was used as a general port for the island, serving both passenger ferries from places such as Chicago as well as logging and produce exports.

=== Logging, Peak, and Decline ===
Crescent became a boomtown with the arrival of large-scale logging operations to North Manitou Island. In 1906 the Smith & Hull Lumber Company purchased 4,000 acres of forest on the west side of the island. The town quickly grew around the base of operations set up around the dock at Crescent, with multiple sawmills, a short line railroad, and a collection of buildings. Alongside the logging operations grew a small resort area was also formed, catering to Chicago residents looking for an escape from the summer heat. A school was formed in 1906 as a branch of the Leland Township school, which continued operations until 1941, only reaching a maximum number of 25 students at once. The Smith & Hull company ended logging operations in 1917, with most of the workers departing soon after to find new jobs. Most of the logging equipment and buildings remained well through World War II, with some of it still operational. A telephone system connecting to Crescent was added as part of an island-wide installation in 1927, servicing the few remaining residents. By the 1930s, the town was abandoned and slowly came apart until stabilization efforts in the 1980s under the National Park Service.

== Remnants ==
Today, there are few built remains of Crescent. The dock fell into disrepair and was eventually destroyed by a storm, along with almost all of the former buildings. The only extant building is Swenson's Barn on the southern end of the settled area. A large clearing and pathways still remain as legacies of human settlement, as well as the former railroad path which has been repurposed into a trail called the Old Grade. The wooden foundation posts of the dock still exist in the shallow parts of the shore, and can be seen today.

== See also ==
- North Manitou Island
- South Manitou Island
- Sleeping Bear Dunes National Lakeshore
