= Boardman Township, Michigan =

- Civil township
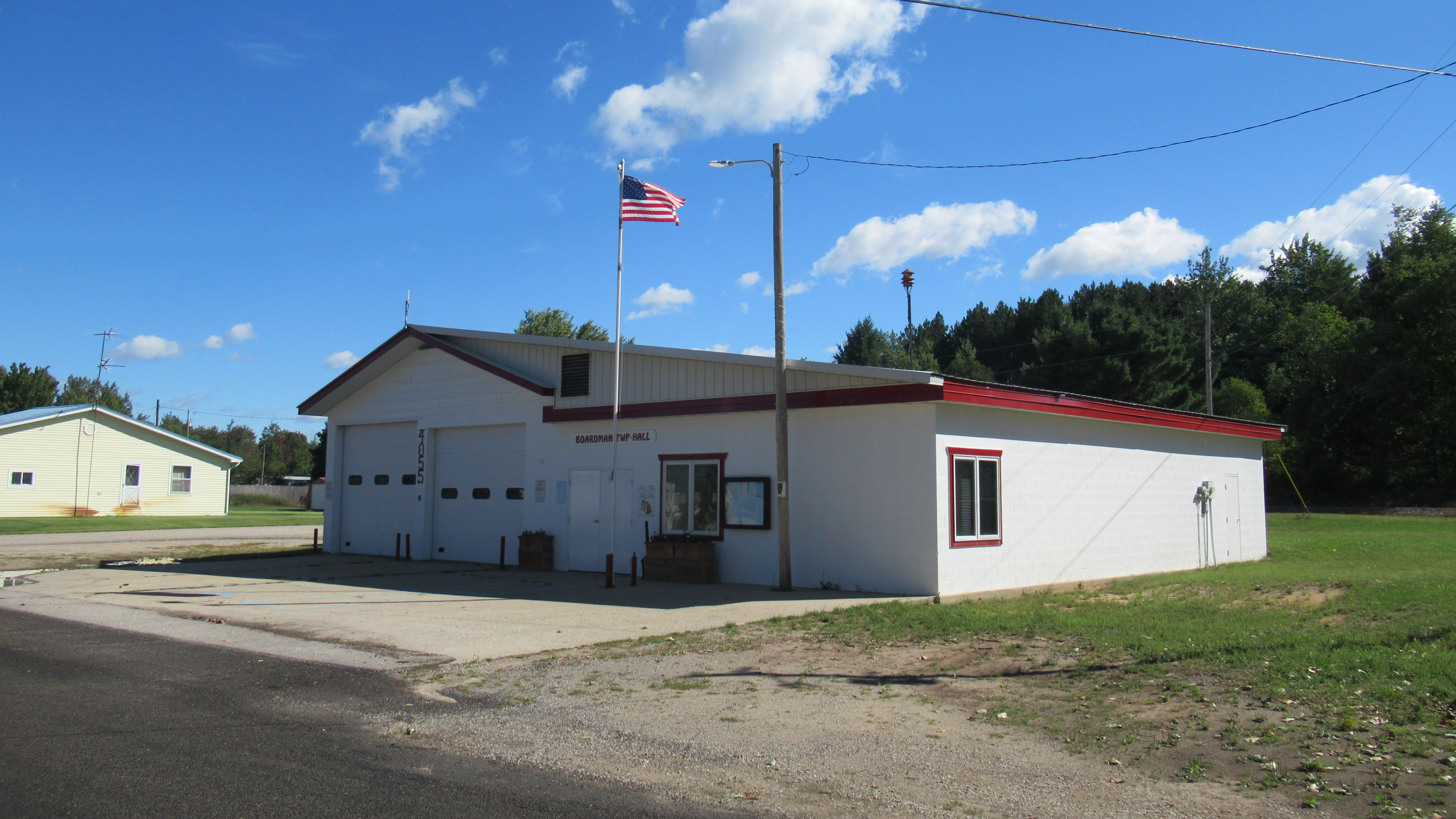
- Boardman Township Hall

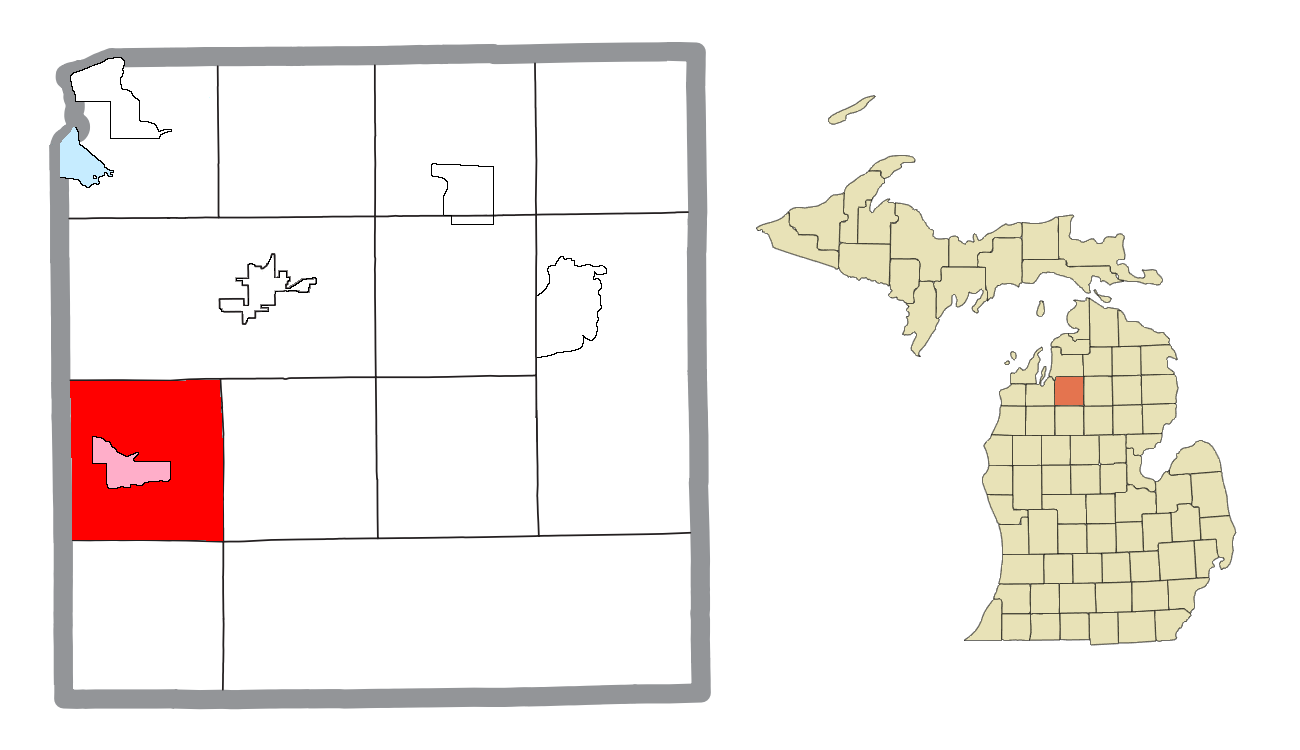
- Location within Kalkaska County (red) and the administered CDP of South Boardman (pink)

- Location within the state of Michigan Boardman Township (the United States)
- Coordinates: 44°38′44″N 85°16′41″W
- Country: United States
- State: Michigan
- County: Kalkaska

Government
  - Supervisor: Gerald Gaultier
  - Clerk: Tonya Hart

Area
  - Total: 36.23 sq mi (93.8 km^{2})
  - Land: 36.05 sq mi (93.4 km^{2})
  - Water: 0.18 sq mi (0.47 km^{2})
- Elevation: 1,010 ft (308 m)

Population (2020)
  - Total: 1,479
  - Density: 42.4/sq mi (16.4/km^{2})
- Time zone: UTC-5 (Eastern (EST))
  - Summer (DST): UTC-4 (EDT)
- ZIP code(s): 49633 (Fife Lake); 49680 (South Boardman)
- Area code: 231
- FIPS code: 26-09440
- GNIS feature ID: 1625958
- Website: Official website

Boardman Township is a civil township of Kalkaska County in the U.S. state of Michigan. As of the 2020 census, the township population was 1,479.

== Communities ==
- Crofton is an unincorporated community approximately 3 miles (4.8 km) northeast of South Boardman along US 131 at 44°40′24″N 85°14′12″W. It was founded and platted by Peter Duthie, David E. and Anna Meek, and John S. and Sarah Harper. They named it for E. Crofton Fox, from whom they had bought the land. A post office operated from October 1875 to November 1884 and again from March 1886 until January 1909. It was a station on the Grand Rapids and Indiana Railroad.
- Houseman is an unincorporated community at 44°36′47″N 85°18′30″W.
- South Boardman is an unincorporated community and census-designated place near the center of the township.

== Geography ==
According to the United States Census Bureau, the township has a total area of 36.23 square miles (93.84 km^{2}), of which 36.05 square miles (93.37 km^{2}) is land and 0.18 square miles (0.47 km^{2}) (0.50%) is water.

US Highway 131 runs diagonally northeast–southwest through the township.

== Demographics ==
As of the census of 2000, there were 1,373 people, 484 households, and 378 families residing in the township. The population density was 38.2 inhabitants per square mile (14.7/km^{2}). There were 630 housing units at an average density of 17.5 per square mile (6.8/km^{2}). The racial makeup of the township was 97.74% White, 0.15% African American, 1.02% Native American, 0.22% Asian, and 0.87% from two or more races. Hispanic or Latino of any race were 0.66% of the population.

There were 484 households, out of which 40.1% had children under the age of 18 living with them, 61.6% were married couples living together, 11.0% had a female householder with no husband present, and 21.9% were non-families. 16.7% of all households were made up of individuals, and 5.4% had someone living alone who was 65 years of age or older. The average household size was 2.84 and the average family size was 3.11.

In the township the population was spread out, with 30.4% under the age of 18, 7.4% from 18 to 24, 31.8% from 25 to 44, 20.1% from 45 to 64, and 10.3% who were 65 years of age or older. The median age was 34 years. For every 100 females, there were 100.1 males. For every 100 females age 18 and over, there were 94.9 males.

The median income for a household in the township was $35,850, and the median income for a family was $37,115. Males had a median income of $30,438 versus $19,118 for females. The per capita income for the township was $14,123. About 9.3% of families and 13.7% of the population were below the poverty line, including 19.1% of those under age 18 and 6.3% of those age 65 or over.
