= Windham Wyndham-Quin =

Windham Wyndham-Quin may refer to:

- Windham Wyndham-Quin, 4th Earl of Dunraven and Mount-Earl (1841 – 1926), Anglo-Irish journalist, landowner, entrepreneur, sportsman and politician
- Windham Wyndham-Quin, 5th Earl of Dunraven and Mount-Earl (1857 – 1952), British Army officer and MP
