= Louis-Emile Durandelle =

French architectural photographer

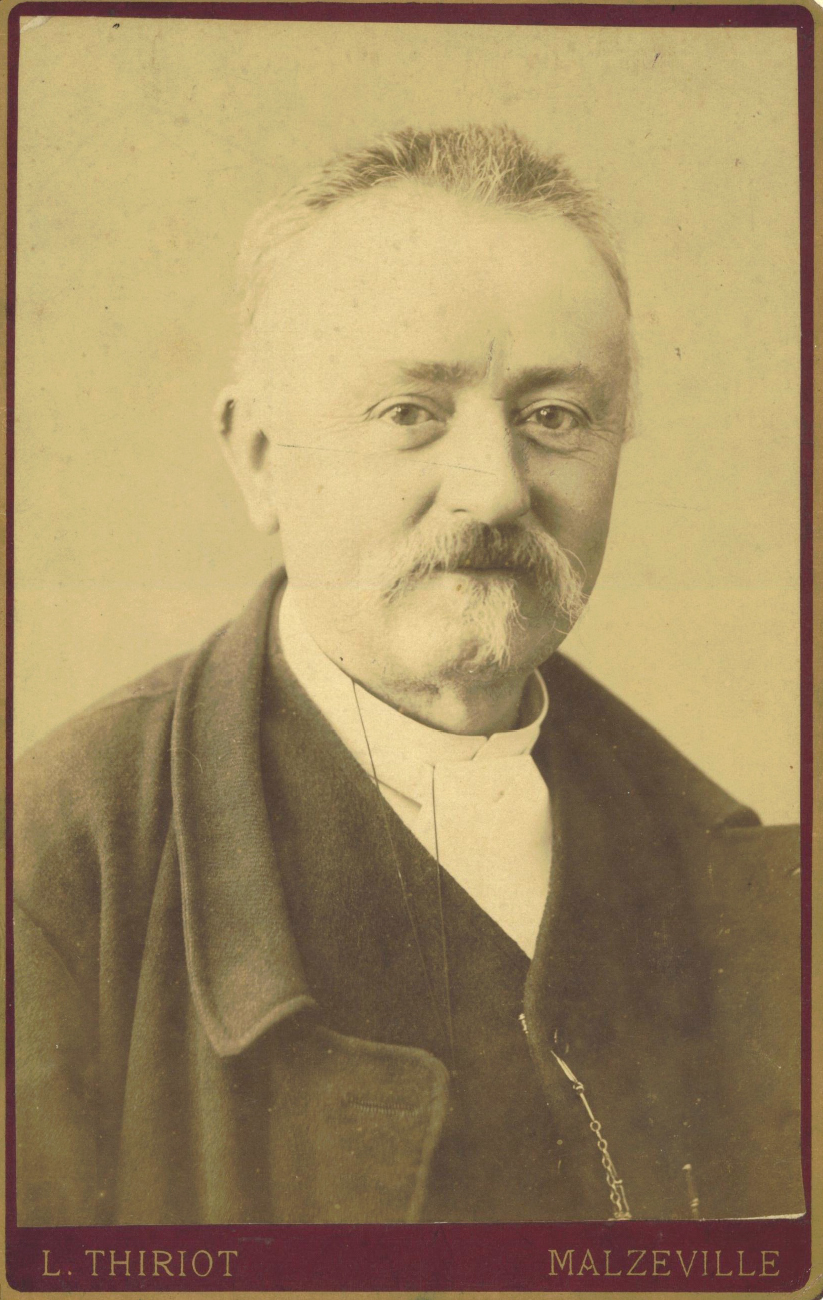
- Portrait of Louis Émile Durandelle by Louis Thiriot
- Born: February 14, 1839; Verdun
- Died: March 12, 1917 (aged 78); Bois-Colombes

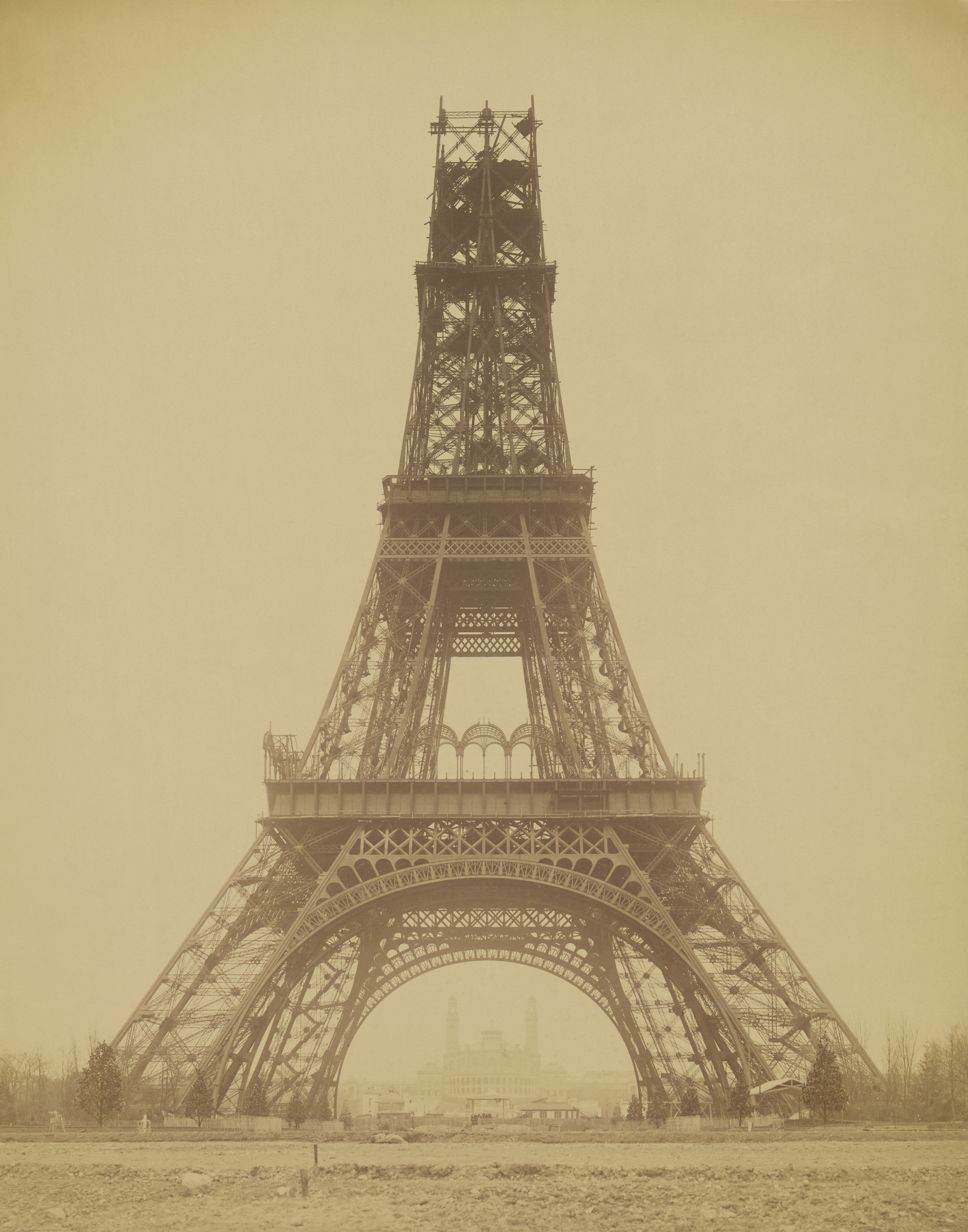
Louis-Emile Durandelle, The Eiffel Tower - State of the Construction, 1888

Louis-Emile Durandelle (14 February 1839 – 12 March 1917) was a French architectural photographer. Durandelle is best known for his documentary photographs of the construction of Parisian buildings, including the Eiffel Tower and the Paris Opera.

== Career ==
From 1854 to 1862 he worked with Hyacinthe César Delmaet and Dalmaet's wife Clémence Jacob as the company Delmaet & Durandelle. The trio lived and worked from 30-32 Chaussé de Cligancourt in Paris. After the death of Delmaet in 1862, Durandelle married Dalmaet's widow, who kept the name Clémence Jacob Dalmaet.

By 1868 the company was operating from 4 Rue du Faubourg Montmartre. Following Delmaet's death, Durandelle documented the construction of the Hotel-Dieu de Paris, Sacre Cour, the Bibliothèque nationale de France, the theater at Monte Carlo and the 1882-1884 excavations under the Louvre Museum. In 1871 Between 1870 and 1871 he photographed the Paris Commune, the insurrection against the government of Napoleon III.

Durandelle published a portfolio in 1876, in collaboration with Charles Garnier, titled Le Nouvel Opéra de Paris: Sculpture ornementale, documenting the Paris Opéra's sculptural decoration. He photographed the construction of the Eiffel Tower from 1887 until 1889.

After the death of his wife in 1890, Dandurelle sold the photography business, along with its negatives, to his assistant and stopped taking photographs.

== Collections ==
- Art Institute of Chicago
- Canadian Centre for Architecture
- Cité de l'Architecture et du Patrimoine, Paris
- Getty Museum
- Metropolitan Museum of Art
- Minneapolis Institute of Arts
- Nelson-Atkins Museum of Art
- Musée d'Orsay, Paris
- Museum of Modern Art, New York
- National Gallery of Art, Washington
- National Gallery of Canada
- San Francisco Museum of Modern Art

== Gallery ==
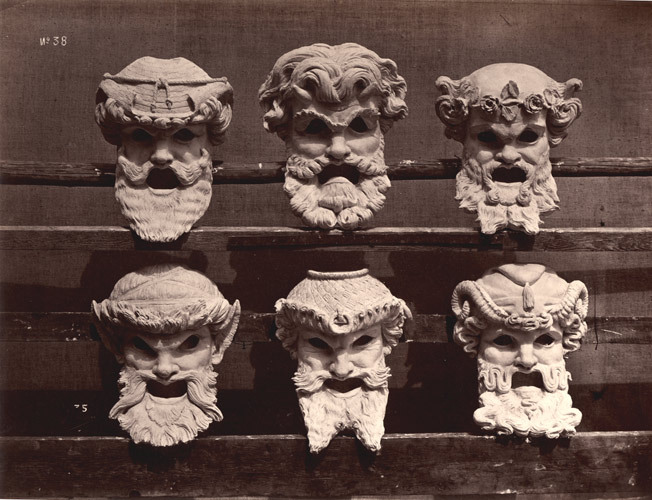
Ornamental Sculpture of the New Paris Opera

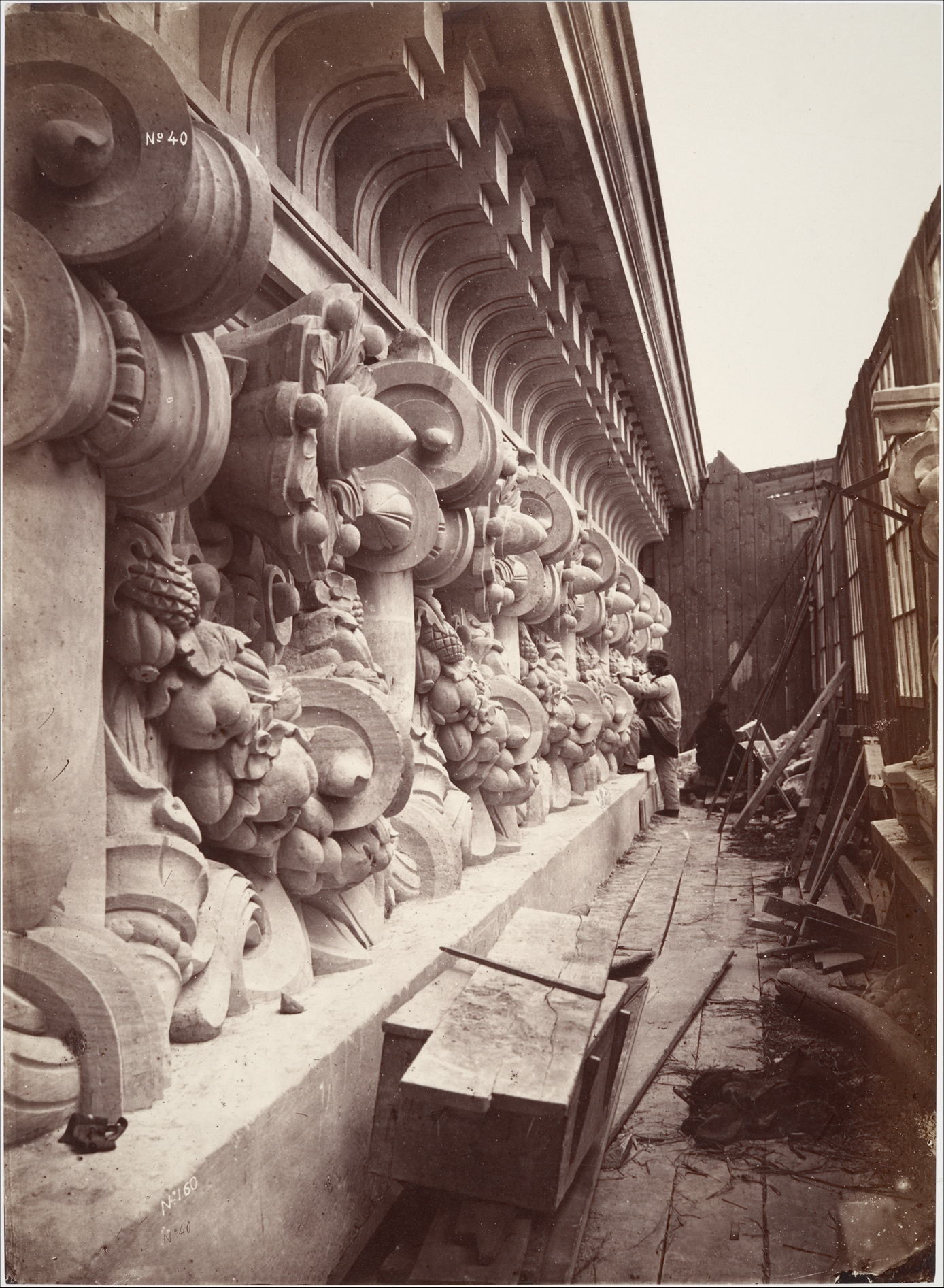
Ornamental Sculpture of the New Paris Opera

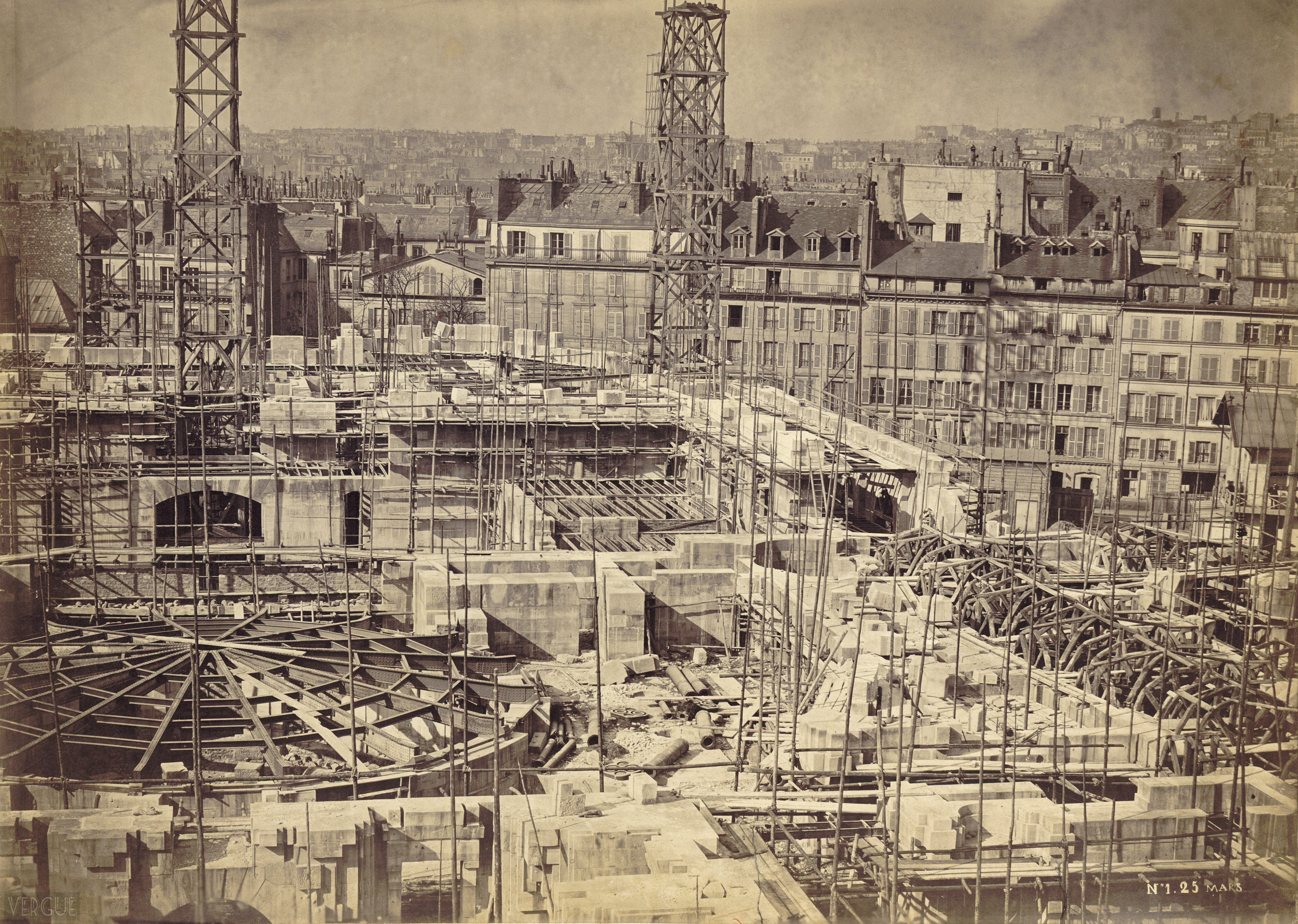
Construction of the Paris Opera, 1864

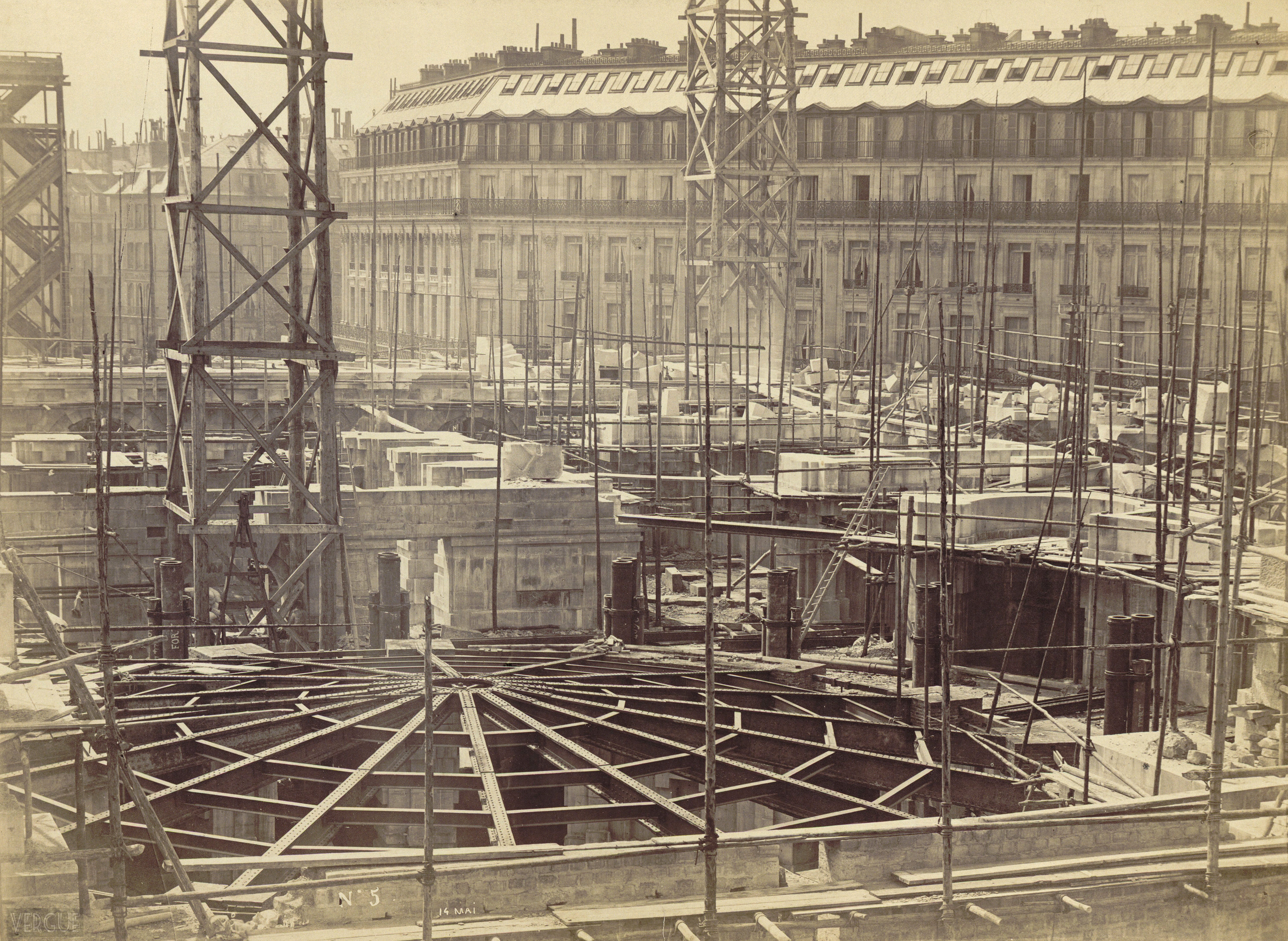
Construction of the Paris Opera, May 1864

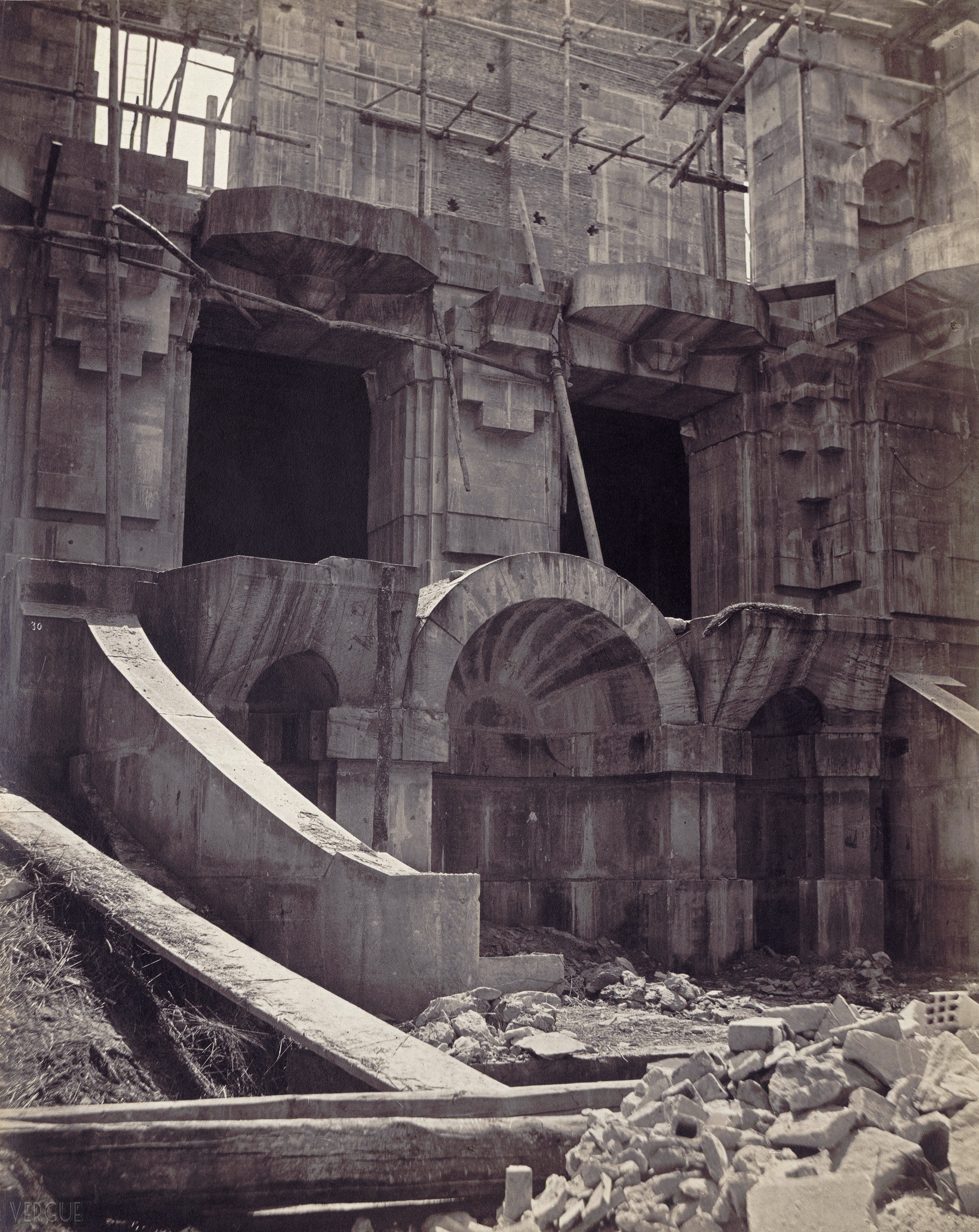
Great staircase of the Paris Opera, 1865

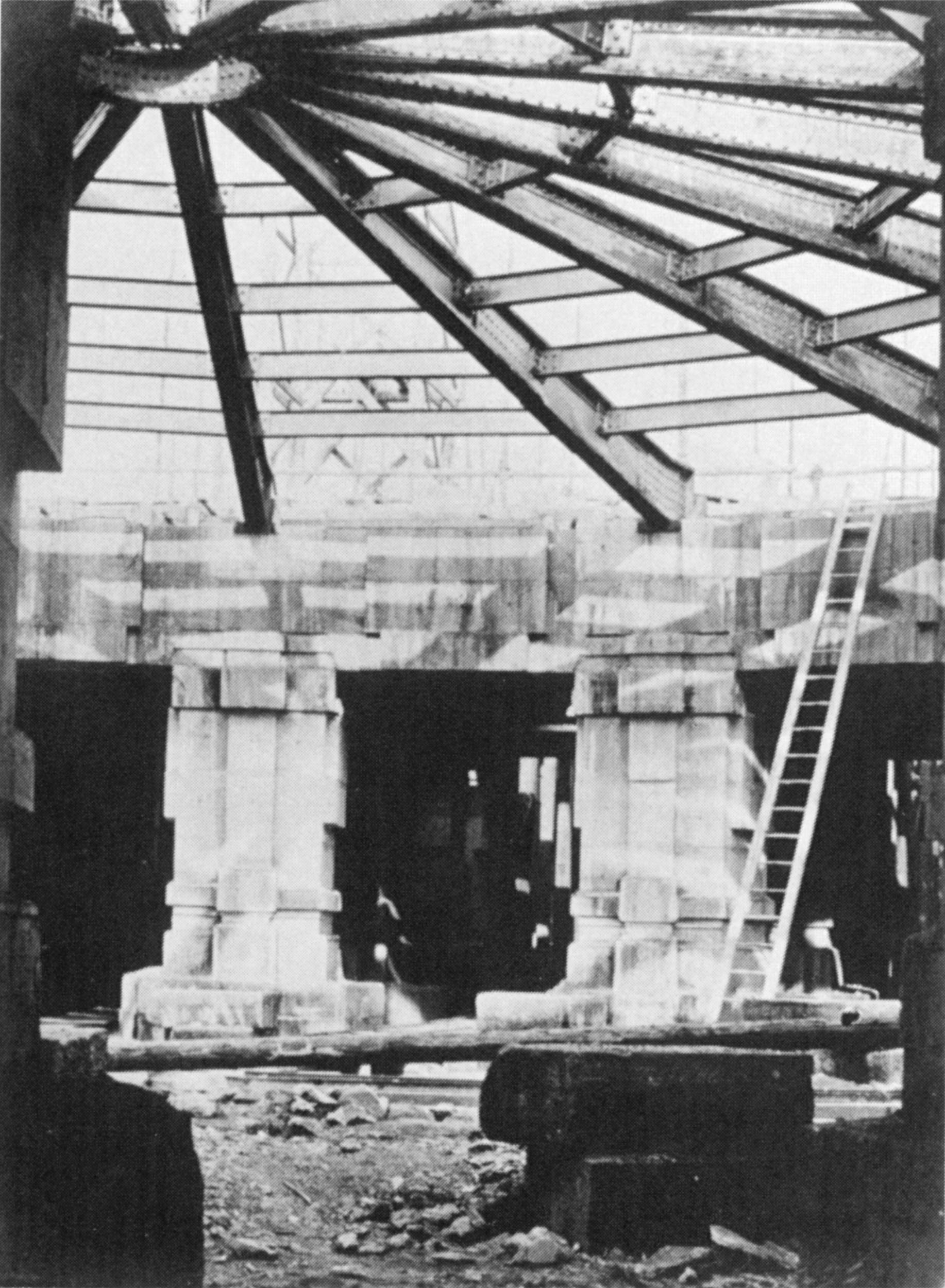
Circular vestibule of the Palais Garnier, 1864.

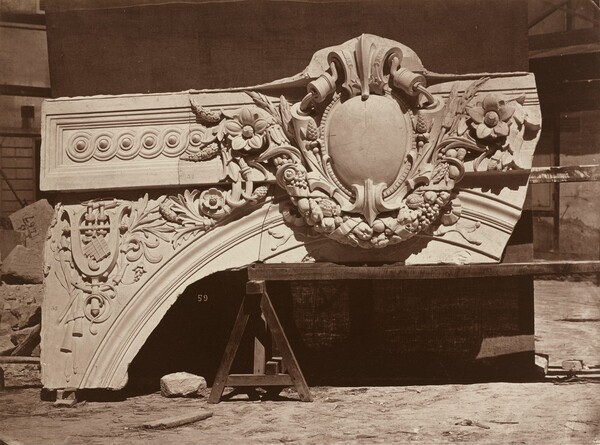
Paris Opera arch detail.

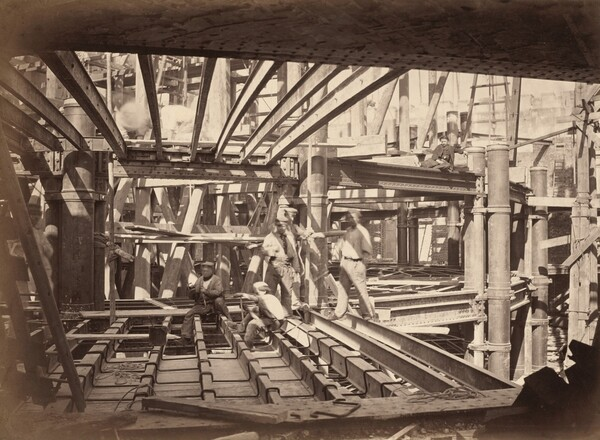
Workers on Girders of Auditorium, New Paris Opera.
