= Quincy Adams =

Quincy Adams may refer to:

== People ==
- John Quincy Adams (1767-1848), the president of the United States from 1825 to 1829
- John Quincy Adams II (1833-1894), American politician and army officer, grandson of John Quincy Adams
- R. J. Q. Adams (born 1943), full name Ralph James Quincy Adams, American historian
- Quincy Adams Gillmore (1825-1888), American civil engineer and army officer
- Quincy Adams Shaw (1825-1908), American businessman
- Quincy Adams Shaw McKean (1891-1971), husband of American tennis player Katherine Winthrop McKean

== Places ==
- John Quincy Adams Birthplace, a historic house in Quincy, Massachusetts, United States
- Quincy Adams station, a rapid transit station in Quincy, Massachusetts, United States
- Mount Quincy Adams (Fairweather Range), on the border between Canada and Alaska, United States
- Mount Quincy Adams, a subsidiary peak of Mount Adams (New Hampshire), New Hampshire, United States

== Fictional works and characters ==
- Quincy Adams Sawyer, a 1922 film
- Quincy Adams Wagstaff, a character in the 1932 Marx Brothers film Horse Feathers
