= Quincy Butler =

Quincy Butler may refer to:

- Quincy Butler (American football) (born 1981)
- Quincy Butler (soccer) (born 2001)
