= South Boardman, Michigan =

- Census-designated place (CDP) & unincorporated community
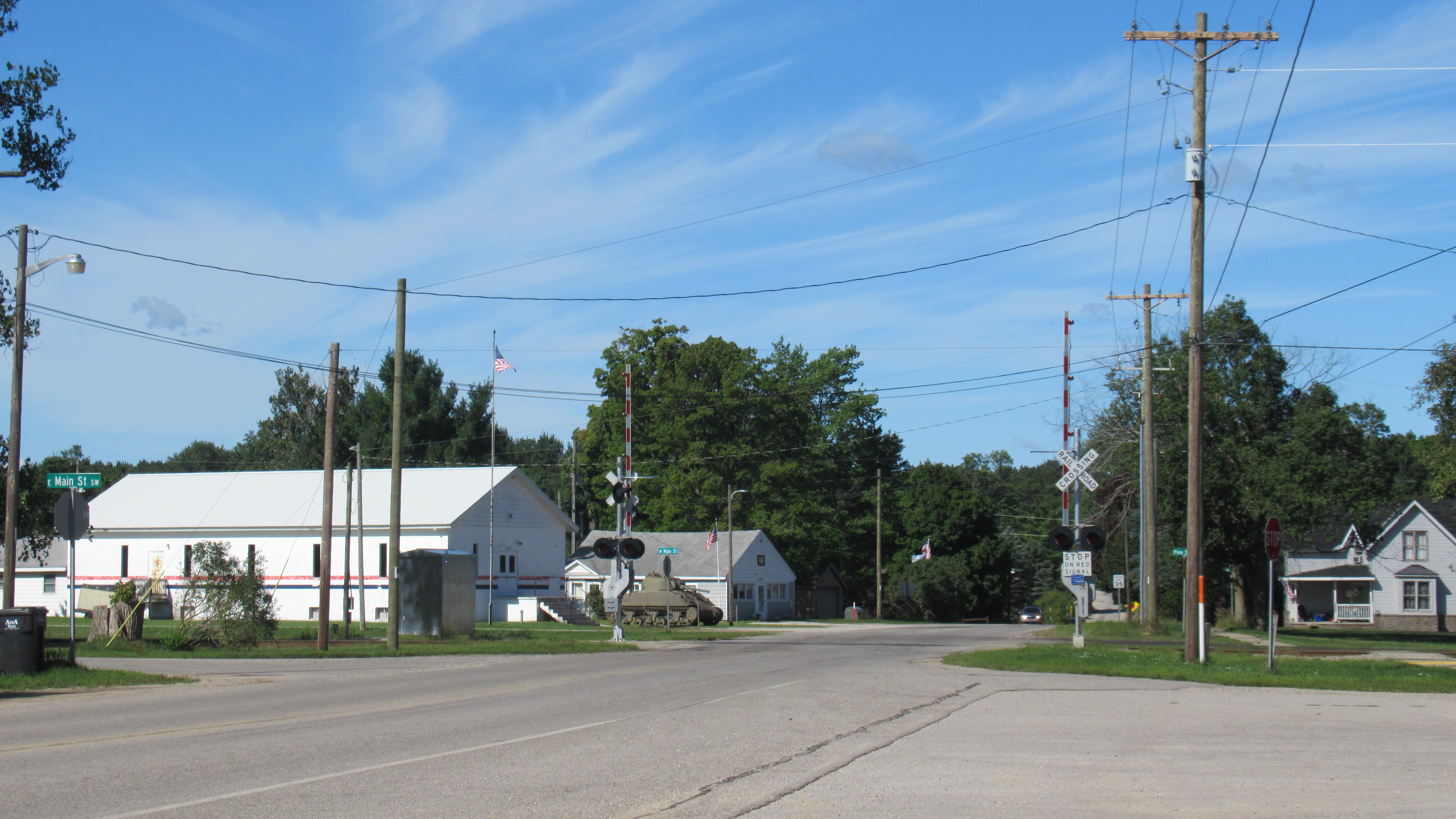
- Looking west along E. Boardman Road

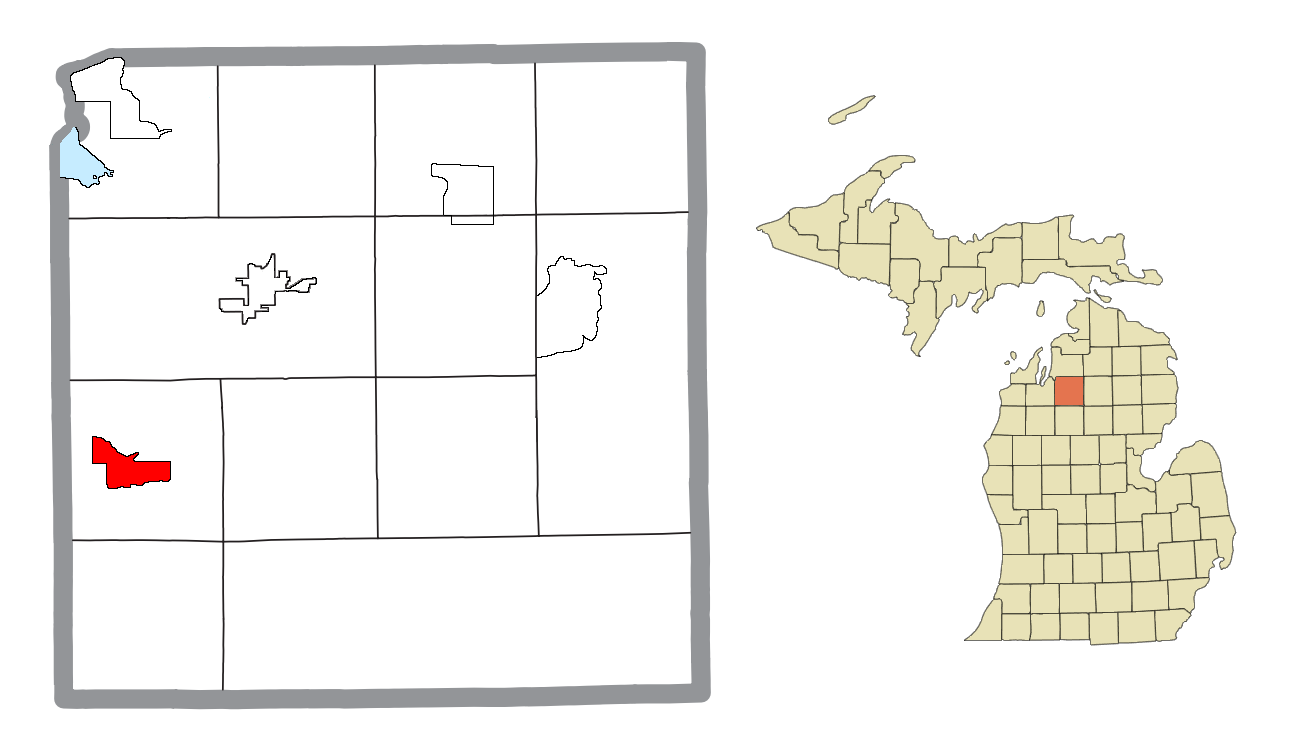
- Location within Kalkaska County

- Location within the state of Michigan South Boardman (the United States)
- Coordinates: 44°38′29″N 85°16′47″W
- Country: United States
- State: Michigan
- County: Kalkaska
- Township: Boardman

Area
  - Total: 3.34 sq mi (8.64 km^{2})
  - Land: 3.29 sq mi (8.53 km^{2})
  - Water: 0.042 sq mi (0.11 km^{2})
- Elevation: 1,007 ft (307 m)

Population (2020)
  - Total: 509
  - Density: 154.5/sq mi (59.67/km^{2})
- Time zone: UTC-5 (Eastern (EST))
  - Summer (DST): UTC-4 (EDT)
- ZIP code(s): 49680
- Area code: 231
- GNIS feature ID: 638270

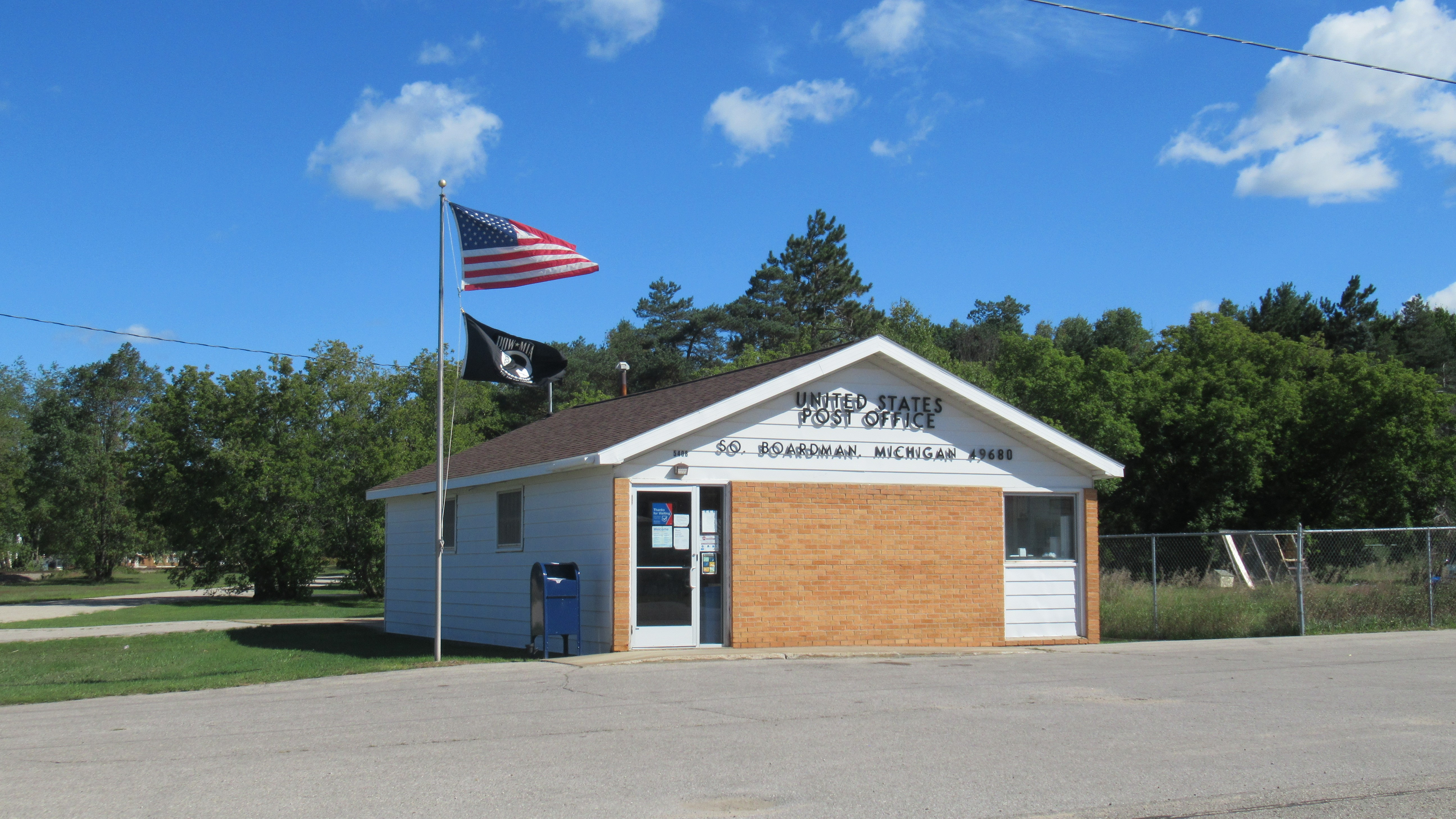
U.S. Post Office in South Boardman

South Boardman is an unincorporated community and census-designated place (CDP) in Kalkaska County in the U.S. state of Michigan. As of the 2020 census, South Boardman had a population of 509. South Boardman is located within Boardman Township.

== Geography ==
According to the United States Census Bureau, the community has an area of 3.34 square miles (8.65 km^{2}), of which 3.29 square miles (8.52 km^{2}) is land and 0.05 square miles (0.13 km^{2}) (1.50%) is water.

It is approximately 8 miles (13 km) southwest of Kalkaska along U.S. Route 131. South Boardman has its own post office with the 49680 ZIP Code.

== History ==
The Grand Rapids and Indiana Railroad was built through the area and platted South Boardman at the juncture of the rail line with the south branch of the Boardman River. Hamilton Stone bought the plat and with associates began operations in 1874, building a depot and hotel. A post office was established in June 1875.

The community of South Boardman was listed as a newly-organized census-designated place for the 2010 census, meaning it now has officially defined boundaries and population statistics for the first time. The CDP is organized for statistical purposes only and has no legal status as an incorporated municipality.

== Demographics ==
Historical population
Census	Pop.	Note	%±
2010	536		—
2020	509		−5.0%
U.S. Decennial Census
