= Quincy Davis (surfer) =

American surfer

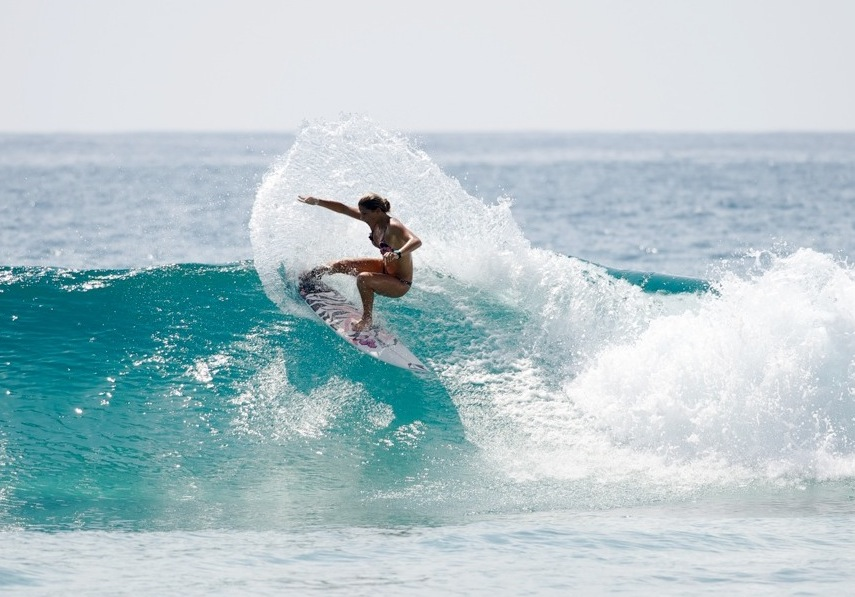

Personal information
- Born: May 18, 1995 (age 31) Montauk, New York, United States
- Height: 5 ft 7 in (1.70 m)
- Website: www.quincymtk.com

Surfing career
- Sport: Surfing
- Best year: 2022
- Sponsors: Volcom, Oakley

Surfing specifications
- Stance: Regular
- Shaper: Channel Islands
- Quiver: 5'6" fred rubble, 5'6" proton
- Favorite waves: Domes, Salina Cruz, Keramas
- Favorite maneuvers: Front side snap

Quincy Rose Davis (born May 18, 1995) is a surfer born in Montauk, New York.

== Early years ==
Davis was born in Montauk, New York. She started surfing when she was seven years old.(Some of her relatives are the Guido's, D'Onofrio's, Schaefer's, and Franza's) With the shore as her backyard, Davis spent long summer days at the beach with her family who were always surfing. After becoming bored of swimming and running around she decided to give surfing a try.

Davis started attending local surf events with older friends and would sometimes compete herself, but always against the boys because there weren't any other girls in her age division. Her amateur career started when she came home with trophies and her mother decided to enter her into more events. Davis credits her family and friends for her constant surfing inspiration and support. Her family has a home in Rincon, Puerto Rico where they spend their winters.

Davis has passions outside of the surf world that include music, Christmas movies and fashion. In 2013, Davis collaborated with her sponsor Volcom, inspiring and designing a clothing collection for Spring and Fall.

Davis currently curates clothing and accessories for her “seasoned outpost” Quincy x MTK located in Montauk, New York. The outpost is tucked away in a little alley, between her family's business, Happy Bowls, and a local Mexican restaurant. The surfer took her passions and turned them into products that resemble “her fun in the sun lifestyle.”

== Career highlights ==
- 2009: 1st NSSA Championships, Open Women
- 2009: 1st, Volcom Qualifying Series (Girls) – Long Beach, N.Y.
- 2010: 1st Corona Extra Pro Surf Circuit –Puerto Rico
- 2012: 1st, Corona Extra Pro Surf Circuit – Puerto Rico
- 2012: 3rd, Oakley World Pro Junior – Bali, Indonesia
- 2013: 3rd, U.S. Open, Pro Junior
- 2015: 1st, Corona Extra Pro Surf Circuit - Puerto Rico
