= Edward Quinn =

Irish photographer (1920–1997)

- Born: February 20, 1920; Dublin, Ireland
- Died: 1997 (aged 76–77); Altendorf, Switzerland
- Education: Irish
- Known for: Photography

Edward Quinn (1920–1997) was born in Ireland. He lived and worked as a photographer from the 1950s, on the Côte d'Azur, during the "golden fifties" the playground of the celebrities from the world of show biz, art and business.

The rich and the famous came to the French Riviera to relax. But the movie stars knew how much their off-screen image counted; Quinn was at the right place at the right time, making spontaneous images which caught their charm, sophistication and chic. Amongst celebrities and stars captured on film by Quinn were Audrey Hepburn, Grace Kelly, Brigitte Bardot, Marlon Brando, Sophia Loren, Aristotle Onassis, Maria Callas, Winston Churchill, and Somerset Maugham.

In 1951 Edward Quinn met and photographed Pablo Picasso for the first time. Their friendship lasted until Picasso's death in 1973. This encounter with Picasso was to be greatly influential to Quinn himself and to his subsequent work. Quinn is the author of several books and films about Picasso.

Since the 1960s Quinn concentrated his work on artists, amongst them Max Ernst, Alexander Calder, Francis Bacon, Salvador Dalí, Graham Sutherland, David Hockney.

In the late 1980s an intense relationship, similar to his friendship with Picasso, linked Quinn to Georg Baselitz.

From 1992 until his death in 1997, Edward Quinn lived near Zürich with his Swiss wife Gret, who died in 2011. Quinn's nephew Wolfgang Frei now manages the extensive photo archive and founded the Edward Quinn Archive Ltd.

== Exhibitions ==
- 1994: Edward Quinn. A Côte d’Azur Album. Museum für Gestaltung, Zürich
- 1994: Edward Quinn. Picasso live. Prinz Max Palais, Karlsruhe
- 1994-1995: Edward Quinn Photographs. Sotheby’s Zürich
- 1995: Edward Quinn. Picasso live. Quadrat Studio-Galerie, Bottrop
- 1996: Edward Quinn: Picasso. Museum der bildenden Künste, Leipzig
- 1996: Edward Quinn. Stars der fünfziger und sechziger Jahre. Scalo, Zürich
- 1996: Edward Quinn. Stars, Stars, Stars. Conolly, London
- 996: Edward Quinn. Gesamtwerk. Prinz Max Palais, Karlsruhe
- 1997: Edward Quinn: Stars und Sternchen. Josef Albers Museum, Bottrop
- 1997: Künstlerporträts. Galerie Stephan Röpke, Köln
- 1997: Edward Quinn. La Côte d’Azur des Stars. Musée d’Art Moderne et Contemporain, Nice
- 1997: Perpetual Emotion: An Affair with the Car in Pictures. (Group Exhibition). Conolly Ltd., London
- 1998: Edward Quinn, Künstlerphotograph. Bahnhof Rolandseck, Rolandseck
- 1998: Edward Quinn. The Charm of Portraits. Celebrities and ArtistsScalo Gallery, New York
- 1998: Hollywood Personalities 1951-1965. PaceWildensteinMacGill. Beverly Hills, California
- 1998: Edward Quinn. Stars und Sternchen. Prinz Max Palais, Karlsruhe
- 1998: La Guerre et la Paix. (Group Exhibition). Musée National Picasso de Vallauris
- 1999: Pablo Picasso – Der Reiz der Fläche. (Group Exhibition). Staatliches Museum Schwerin
- 2000: Edward Quinn. Stars, Stars, Stars. Festival de Télévision de Monte Carlo, Monaco
- 2006: Edward Quinn, Riviera Cocktail. Die 50er Jahre an der Côte d’Azur. Photography Monika Mohr Galerie, Hamburg, Germany
- 2006: Edward Quinn. Photographing Hollywood during the golden Fifties on the French Riviera. Scalo Guye Gallery, Los Angeles
- 2006: Edward Quinn - Riviera Cocktail. Galerie Abbt Projects, Zurich
- 2007: Edward Quinn - The Rich and Famous - Vintages und Later Prints, Ausstellung vom 12. September bis zum 13. Oktober 2007 im Stadtmuseum in Köln
- 2007: Edward Quinn and Picasso, Paintings and Photos. Galerie Pels-Leusden, Zurich,
- 2007: Edward Quinn. A day’s work. Vintage Prints. Michael Hoppen Gallery, London
- 2007: Ikonen der Leinwand. (Group Exhibition). Ernst Barlach Museum, Wedel, Germany
- 2007: Edward Quinn – The Rich and Famous. Vintage and Later Prints. Galerie Boisserée, Köln.
- 2008: Picasso & Women. (Group Exhibition). Arken Museum, DK
- 2008: Edward Quinn - Riviera Cocktail. Ludwig Museum, Koblenz/Germany
- 2008: Edward Quinn. Riviera Cocktail. Suite 59, Maastricht/NL 2008
- 2008: Pigozzi and the Paparazzi with Salomon, Weegee, Galella and Quinn. (Group Exhibition). Museum für Fotografie (Berlin)
- 2008: GOLDEN FIFTIES - Photographien von Edward Quinn. Kunst im Palais am Lenbachplatz, Credit Suisse, Munich
- 2009: Pablo Picasso - Kreativität und Schaffensfreude. Clemens-Sels-Museum, Neuss/Germany
- 2009: Edward Quinn, Stars and Cars of the ‚50s. Photography Monika Mohr Galerie. Hamburg.
- 2009: Stars and Cars von Edward Quinn. Reygers Galerie für Photographie. Munich
- 2009: Le Geste Picasso. (Group Exhibition). La Galerie d'art du Conseil Général des Bouches du Rhône, Aix en Provence.
- 2009: Edward Quinn: Stars and Cars. ZeitHaus, Autostadt Wolfsburg.
- 2010: The Picasso Story. Humboldt Carrée, Berlin
- 2010: Edward Quinn – Riviera Cocktail. Leica Galerie Frankfurt. Rahn Foto & Fine Art
- 2011: MeMyselfandI (Ich und Ich und Ich). Photo Portraits of Picasso. (Group Exhibition). Museum Ludwig, Köln
- 2012: Conmigo, Yo Mismo, Yo. Museo Picasso Malaga. Retratos fotográficos de Pablo Picasso. (Group Exhibition).
- 2012: Ich und Ich und Ich. Photo Portraits of Picasso. (Group Exhibition). Museum für Kunst und Gewerbe, Hamburg, Germany
- 2012: Edward Quinn. Pablo Picasso. Photography Monika Mohr Galerie, Hamburg, Germany
- 2013: Pablo Picasso: Arbeiten auf Papier. Edward Quinn Fotografien. Galerie des 20. Jahrhunderts, Basel
- 2013: Monaco fête Picasso. Picasso Côte d'Azur. (Group exhibition). Grimaldi Forum Monaco
- 2014: Sylvette, Sylvette, Sylvette. Picasso Und Das Modell. (Group Exhibition). Kunsthalle Bremen
- 2014: Picasso: Ich sehe die Dinge In anderer Art. Grafische Werke Sammlung Boisserée. (Group Exhibition). Galerie Boisserée, Köln und Galerie Reithalle Paderborn
- 2014: Edward Quinn. Celebrity Pets, Photography Monika Mohr Galerie. Hamburg
- 2014: Edward Quinn: Stars in Cannes, Reygers Galerie für Photographie. Munich
- 2014: Grace Kelly, Princess and Style Icon, Paleis Het Loo, Apeldoorn Nl (Group Exhibition)
- 2014: Picasso and the Camera, Curated By John Richardson. Gagosian Gallery New York. (Group Exhibition).
- 2014: The Legend of Art, Picasso Exhibition, Shanghai, China
- 2015: Picasso in the Studio, Cahiers d’art, Paris. (Group Exhibition)
- 2016: Picasso. Fenster zur Welt, Bucerius Kunstforum, Hamburg. (Group Exhibition)
- 2016: Picasso In China. Riverside Art Museum Beijing.
- 2016: Pablo Picasso, Légende de l’art, Picasso Ceramics and 83 Edward Quinn Photos, Saint-Tropez, Salle Jean Despas
- 2016: Edward Quinn - Stars & Cars, ArteF - Galerie für Kunstfotografie, Zurich
- 2016: Picasso, Regards croisés (Picasso, Fresh Perspectives), Château Palmer, Margaux, France
- 2016: Picasso's Picassos. Gagosian, Madison Av., New York (Group Exhibition)
- 2017: Picasso sans cliché. Photographies d’Edward Quinn, Musée Picasso Antibes
- 2017: Picasso and Maya. Father and Daughter. Gagosian Gallery. With 42 photos by Edward Quinn. (Group Exhibition)
- 2017: Edward Quinn - My Friend Picasso, Danubiana Meulensteen Art Museum, Bratislava: 125 Photos by Edward Quinn
- 2018: Des Animaux et des Stars – Stars and Pets. Musée de la Gendarmerie et du Cinéma, Saint-Tropez
- 2018: Edward Quinn – Mein Freund Picasso. 125 selten ausgestellte Fotografien. Kunstmuseum Picasso, Münster
- 2018: Picasso e l'altra metà del cielo. With 80 Photographs by Edward Quinn. Apulia/Italy: Palazzo Tanzarella Ostuni
- 2018: My Friend Picasso: 125 Photographs by Edward Quinn. Castletown House, Kildare, near Dublin, Ireland
- 2018: Picasso/Dominguin – une amitié. With 26 Photographs by Edward Quinn. Musée des Cultures Taurines, Nîmes
- 2018: Edward Quinn – Riviera Cocktail. Leica Galerie Salzburg
- 2018: Picasso. La scultura. Galleria Borghese, Roma. With photographs of Picasso's sculpture studio by Edward Quinn.
- 2018: Picasso - Ritratto intimo. Foto di Edward Quinn. Palazzo Buffalini - Piazza Duomo. Spoleto/Italia
- 2019: Picasso to Hockney. Edward Quinn, Photographer of Artists. ArteF Gallery, Zurich
- 2019: Monaco, 6 May 1955. Photos by Edward Quinn of the first meeting of Grace Kelly and Prince Rainier. Palace of Monaco
- 2019: Picasso e la fotografia. Le fotografie di Edward Quinn, 1951-1973. Palazzo Merulana, Roma
- 2019: Picasso. L'altra meta del cielo. Museo Mediceo di Palazzo Medici Riccardi, Firenze
- 2020: Von Picasso bis Hockney. Edward Quinn. Künstlerfotograf. Stadtturmgalerie Gmünd/A
- 2022: Maya Ruiz-Picasso, daughter of Pablo. 40 photos of Maya and Picasso. Musée nationale Picasso-Paris
- 2023: Picasso y los años dorados de la Costa Azul. 140 photos by Edward Quinn. Centro Cultural La Malagueta, Malaga, Spain
- 2023: Picasso y los años dorados de la Costa Azul. 140 photos by Edward Quinn. Centro de Historias, Zaragoza, Spain

== Literature ==
- Picasso. Werk und Tage. Manesse, Zürich 1965.
- Picasso at work. A photographic study. Text by Roland Penrose. New York 1964.
- James Joyce’s Dublin. Secker and Warburg, London 1974.
- Max Ernst. Atlantis, Zürich 1976
- Picasso. Photos 1951-1972. Barron’s, New York 1980.
- Graham Sutherland, Complete Graphic Work. Roberto Tossi, Edward Quinn. Barcelona 1978.
- Picasso avec Picasso. Pierre Bordas Art XX éme 1987
- The Private Picasso. Edward Quinn and Pierre Daix. Stuttgart, Paris, Boston 1987.
- Picasso. Mensch und Bild. Klett-Cotta, Stuttgart 1988.
- Georg Baselitz. Eine fotografische Studie von Edward Quinn. Benteli, Bern 1993.
- Edward Quinn, Fotograf Nizza. Hrsg. v. Martin Heller. Scalo, Zürich 1994.
- Picasso in 3D. Thames and Hudson, London 1995.
- Stars, Stars, Stars... Off the Screen. Scalo, Zürich 1996.
- Riviera Cocktail. teNeues 2007
- Stars and Cars of the'50s. teNeues 2008
- Celebrity Pets. teNeues 2014
- Picasso sans cliché. Hazan, Paris 2017
- Mein Freund Picasso. Wienand, Köln 2018
- Monaco Motor Racing. Delius Klasing, Bielefeld 2022
- Picasso, Friends and Family. Hatje Cantz, Berlin 2023

== Documentary film ==
- Riviera Cocktail : Edward Quinn – Photographer – Nice, a film by Heinz Bütler, Switzerland, 2006
