= Quinn Wilder =

Canadian author

Quinn Wilder is a Canadian author of contemporary romance novels. Thirteen of her novels were published in Harlequin Romance line. Her novels have been translated into several languages, including Swedish.

== Works ==
- That Man from Texas (1985)
- To Tame a Wild Heart (1987)
- Daughter of the Stars (1987)
- High Heaven (1989)
- Macnamara's Bride (1989)
- Outlaw Heart (1990)
- Ride a Storm (1991)
- Devon's Desire (1991)
- Build a Dream (1993)
- One Shining Summer (1993)
- Dream Man (1994)
- Heart's Refuge (1995)
- Untamed Melody (1995)
