= Edward Quin (journalist) =

Irish journalist (died 1823)

Edward Quin (died 1823) was an Irish journalist in London.

== Life ==
Born in Dublin, Quin seems to have spent some years in France, where he taught pugilism. Ultimately he followed the career of a journalist in London.

In about 1803, Quin started The Traveller, a journal intended to represent commercial travellers. It was one of the earliest professional journals, but it "was much more than a class journal, being ... a bold advocate of political reforms. 'If it has not much wit or brilliancy', said a contemporary critic, 'it is distinguished by sound judgment, careful information, and constitutional principles”’ (Fox Bourne, i. 288). As editor of the paper, Quin accepted some of the earliest of Leigh Hunt's essays. In 1823 The Traveller was merged in the Globe under the general title of The Globe and Traveller. Quin also owned and edited The Day until its amalgamation with the New Times. He was elected a common councilman for the ward of Farringdon Without in 1805, and developed a reputation for eloquence in the council.

Quin died of apoplexy at Sheerness on 7 July 1823. He published under his own name a Speech on Deputy Birch's Motion to petition Parliament against the Admission of Catholics into the Army, London, 1807; and Irish Charitable Society: a Letter advocating the Establishment of a Charity under the above Designation, with other Documents, London, 1812.

== Family ==
A son, Edward Quin (1794–1828), matriculated from Magdalen Hall, Oxford, in 26 November 1812; graduated B.A. in 1817, and M.A. in 1820, and was called to the bar at Lincoln's Inn in 1823. He published An Historical Atlas in a Series of Maps of the World, London, 1840, of which several editions were issued; and Universal History from the Creation, reprinted from preceding work, 12mo, London, 1838. He died at Hare Court, Temple, on 4 May 1828, aged 34.
