= Quinn, Michigan =

Former settlement in Michigan

Coordinates: 42°32′25″N 82°54′27″W

The former settlement of Quinn, Michigan, was located in Clinton Township, Macomb County, Michigan, United States, on Gratiot past mile marker 16, roughly in the area of 14 Mile and Quinn Road. Quinn Rd. is still a Clinton Township street crossing Gratiot.

== History ==
Theodore Kath became Quinn's first postmaster on December 10, 1869. The post office stayed open for just under four years, closing its doors on September 15, 1873. The 12th Michigan Infantry was begun under Colonel Francis Quinn at Niles in 1861. The Quinn family built a home on Gratiot in 1881 and the settlement and street was named for the family. There were also reports of Underground Railroad activity in the area prior to the Civil War.
