= Quinn (surname) =

- Language: Irish

Origin
- Meaning: Son of Conn
- Region of origin: Ireland

Quinn is an Anglicised form of the Irish Ó Coinn or Mac Cuinn. The latter surname means "descendant of Conn". The surname Quinn is also rendered Ó Cuinn or Mac Cuinn in Irish. The surname is borne by several unrelated families in Ireland, especially in Ulster and also in the counties of Clare, Longford, and Mayo. According to the historian C. Thomas Cairney, the O'Quins were part of the Conmaicne Rein tribe in Ireland who came from the Erainn tribe who were the second wave of Celts to settle in Ireland from about 500 and 100 BC. The most notable family of the name are that of Thomond, a Dalcassian sept, who derive their surname from Niall Ó Cuinn who was slain at the Battle of Clontarf in 1014. This family was formerly represented by the Earls of Dunraven. Another family is that seated in Annaly, who were related to the O'Farrell lords of Longford. Another Quinn family was seated at An Chraobh, County Tyrone and they were related to the O'Neill Kings of Tír Eoghain and for whom they acted as Hereditary Quartermasters. Other families include one seated in County Antrim; one seated in Raphoe; and one called Clann Cuain, seated near Castlebar. In the seventeenth century, the surname Quinn was common in Waterford. In 1890, the surname was numerous in Dublin and in counties Tyrone, Antrim, and Roscommon. Quinn is one of the twenty most common surnames in Ireland. The surname Quinn is sometimes associated with Catholics, while Quin is associated with Protestants.

== Surname ==
=== A ===
- Abby Quinn (born 1996), American actress
- Adam Quinn (born 1973), American bagpipe player
- Aidan Quinn (born 1959), American actor
- Aileen Quinn (born 1971), American actress, singer and dancer
- Alan Quinn (born 1979), Irish footballer
- Albert Quinn (1920–2008), English footballer
- Alex Quinn (racing driver) (born 2000), British racing driver
- Alexander Quinn (disambiguation), multiple people
- Alexandra Quinn (born 1973), Canadian former pornstar
- Alison Quinn (born 1977), Australian Paralympic athlete
- Alistair Quinn (born 1993), Australian footballer
- Andrea Quinn (born 1964), English conductor
- Andrew Quinn (born 1983), Irish hurler
- Anthony Quinn (disambiguation), multiple people
- Aodhan Quinn (born 1992), American soccer player
- Austin Quinn (1892–1974), Irish prelate
- Austin Quinn-Davidson (born 1979), American politician

=== B ===
- Barry Quinn (born 1979), Irish footballer
- Bart Quinn (1917–2013), American basketball player
- Bernard Quinn (born 1947), Scottish footballer
- Bernard J. Quinn (1888–1940), American priest
- Bertha Quinn (1873–1951), British suffragette
- Bill Quinn (1912–1994), American actor
- Billy Quinn (disambiguation), multiple people
- Bob Quinn (disambiguation), multiple people
- Bradley Quinn (born 1976), Northern Irish photographer
- Brady Quinn (born 1984), American football player
- Brandon Quinn (born 1977), American actor
- Brendan Quinn (born 1960), Irish runner
- Brian Quinn (disambiguation), multiple people

=== C ===
- Cameron Quinn, American lawyer and professor
- Carl Quinn, Canadian singer-songwriter
- Carmel Quinn (1925–2021), Irish-American entertainer
- Carolyn Quinn (born 1961), British journalist
- Celia Quinn, Irish camogie player
- Charles Quinn (1930–2013), American journalist
- Chris Quinn (born 1983), American basketball player
- Chris Quinn (rugby league) (born 1968), Australian rugby league footballer
- Christine Quinn (born 1966), American politician
- Christopher Quinn (disambiguation), multiple people
- Clare Quinn, Irish soprano
- Clark Quinn, American lieutenant general
- Colin Quinn (born 1959), American actor and comedian
- C. Patrick Quinn (1900–1969), American politician

=== D ===
- Daire Quinn, Irish sportsperson
- Damien Quinn (disambiguation), multiple people
- Damon Quinn (born 1964), Northern Irish actor
- Daniel Quinn (disambiguation), multiple people
- Danny Quinn (born 1964), Italian actor
- David Quinn (disambiguation), multiple people
- Declan Quinn (born 1957), American cinematographer
- Deirdre Quinn (born 1973), American model
- Deirdre Quinn (entrepreneur), American businesswoman
- Dennis Michael Quinn (1944–2021), American historian
- Derry Quinn (1918–1987), English novelist and screenwriter
- Don Quinn (1900–1967), American comedy writer
- Doris M. Quinn (1923–2003), American politician

=== E ===
- Ed Quinn (born 1968), American actor
- Eddie Quinn (1906–1965), American wrestling manager
- Edel Quinn (1907–1944), Irish missionary and saint
- Edmond Thomas Quinn (1868–1929), American sculptor
- Edward Quinn (1920–1997), Irish photographer
- Edward W. Quinn, American politician
- Eimear Quinn (born 1972), Irish singer
- Elmer F. Quinn (1895–1952), American politician
- Emmett Quinn (1877–1930), Canadian ice hockey executive and businessman
- Eric Shaw Quinn, American author
- Ethan Quinn (born 2004), American tennis player
- Evans Quinn (born 1983), Nicaraguan boxer

=== F ===
- Feargal Quinn (1936–2019), Irish politician and businessman
- Felix Patrick Quinn (1874–1961), Canadian industrialist and politician
- Fergal Quinn (snooker player) (born 2000), Northern Irish professional snooker player
- Frances Quinn (born 1981), British baker
- Frances Elizabeth Quinn, Irish-American soldier
- Francesco Quinn (1963–2011), American actor
- Francis Quinn (1921–2019), American prelate
- Francis Quinn (racing driver) (1903–1931), American racing driver
- Frank Quinn (disambiguation), multiple people
- Freddy Quinn (born 1931), Austrian singer and actor

=== G ===
- Gavin Quinn, Australian rugby league footballer
- Ged Quinn (born 1963), English artist
- Geraldine Quinn (born 1975), Australian songwriter
- Gerard Quinn, American law professor
- Gerry Quinn (hurler) (born 1980), Irish sportsperson
- Gerry Quinn (sportsman, born 1917) (1917–1968), Irish cricketer and rugby union footballer
- Glenn Quinn (1970–2002), Irish actor
- Gordon Quinn (born 1942), American documentary filmmaker
- Gordon Quinn (footballer) (1932–2018), English footballer
- Graham Quinn (disambiguation), multiple people

=== H ===
- Hayden Quinn (born 1986), Australian chef
- Helen Quinn (born 1943), Australian physicist

=== I ===
- I. T. Quinn (1887–1972), American conservationist
- Isaac N. Quinn (1795–1865), American politician
- Ivan Quinn (1899–1969), American football player

=== J ===
- Jack Quinn (disambiguation), multiple people
- Jacqueline Quinn (born 1965), Irish fashion designer
- James Quinn (disambiguation), multiple people, including
  - James H. Quinn (1857–1930), American judge
- Jamie Quinn (actor), Scottish actor
- Jane Bryant Quinn (born 1939), American financial journalist
- Jason Quinn (chef), American chef
- Jeanne Quinn (born 1953), American ceramic artist
- Jeff Quinn (born 1962), American college football coach
- Jennifer Quinn, American mathematician
- Jimmy Quinn (disambiguation), multiple people
- Joanna Quinn (born 1962), English film director
- Joanna R. Quinn (born 1973), Canadian political scientist
- Joe Quinn (disambiguation), multiple people
- John Quinn (disambiguation), multiple people
- Johnny Quinn (born 1983), American football player and bobsledder
- Jonathan Quinn (born 1975), American football player
- Jonny Quinn (born 1972), Irish drummer
- Joseph Quinn (disambiguation), multiple people
- Josephine Crawley Quinn, British archaeologist
- Judy Quinn (born 1974), Canadian writer
- Julia Quinn (born 1970), American author
- Justin Quinn (born 1968), Irish poet

=== K ===
- Karla Quinn (born 1988), British figure skater
- Kate Quinn, American writer
- Keith Quinn (disambiguation), multiple people
- Kellin Quinn (born 1986), American singer
- Kelly Quinn (born 1963), American football player
- Kenneth Quinn (cricketer) (born 1971), Antiguan cricketer
- Kenneth M. Quinn (born 1942), American diplomat
- Kermit Quinn, American singer
- Kerri Quinn, Northern Irish actress and singer
- Kevin Quinn (disambiguation), multiple people
- Kimberly Quinn (journalist) (born 1961), American journalist
- Kimberly Quinn (actress), American actress
- Klark Quinn (born 1982), Australian racing driver

=== L ===
- Larry Quinn (lacrosse) (born 1963), American lacrosse player
- Larry Quinn (ice hockey) (born 1952), American ice hockey executive
- Lawrie Quinn (born 1956), English politician
- Liam Quinn (born 1949), American-Irish army officer
- Lisa Quinn (born 1967), American television host
- Lochlann Quinn (born 1940), Irish businessman and philanthropist
- Lonnie Quinn (born 1963), American weatherman
- Lorenzo Quinn (born 1966), Italian artist and sculptor
- Louis Quinn (1915–1988), American actor
- Louis Joseph Quinn (1928–2007), English missionary
- Louise Quinn (born 1990), Irish footballer
- Lucy Quinn (born 1993), English footballer

=== M ===
- Maire Quinn (1872–1947), Irish actress
- Marc Quinn (born 1964), English artist
- Marcus Quinn (born 1959), American football player
- Marguerite Quinn, American politician
- Mark Quinn (born 1974), American baseball player
- Martha Quinn (born 1959), American media personality
- Martin Quinn (disambiguation), multiple people
- Marty Quinn (disambiguation), multiple people
- Mary Alice Quinn (1920–1935), American schoolgirl
- Mary Ellen Quinn (born 1949), American librarian
- Matt Quinn (born 1993), English-New Zealand cricketer
- Matthew Quinn (disambiguation), multiple people
- Maureen E. Quinn, American civil servant
- Maz Quinn (born 1976), New Zealand surfer
- Michael Quinn (disambiguation), multiple people
- Mickey Quinn, Irish Gaelic footballer
- Micky Quinn (born 1962), English footballer
- Mike Quinn (disambiguation), multiple people
- Molly Quinn (born 1993), American actress

=== N ===
- Nancy Quinn (1919–2014), American public figure
- Naomi Quinn (1939–2019), American anthropologist
- Ned Quinn (1923–2019), Irish hurler
- Nesanel Quinn (1910–2005), American rabbi and educator
- Neville Quinn (1908–1934), South African cricketer
- Niall Quinn (disambiguation), multiple people
- Nicholas Quinn (disambiguation), multiple people
- Noel Quinn (born 1962), British banking executive
- Noelle Quinn (born 1985), American basketball player

=== O ===
- Oisín Quinn (born 1969), Irish politician
- Ollie Quinn (1893–1949), American mob boss
- Owen J. Quinn (born 1941), American parachutist

=== P ===
- Padraig Quinn (1899–1974), Irish officer
- Paddy Quinn (disambiguation), multiple people
- Pat Quinn (disambiguation), multiple people
- Patricia Quinn (disambiguation), multiple people
- Paul Quinn (disambiguation), multiple people
- Paula Quinn (born 1961), American novelist
- Percy Quinn (1876–1944), Canadian athlete and ice hockey executive
- Peter Quinn (disambiguation), multiple people
- Philip L. Quinn (1940–2004), American philosopher

=== Q ===
- Quinn (born 1995), Canadian soccer player and Olympic gold medalist

=== R ===
- R. Joseph Quinn (born 1942), American lawyer, judge, and politician
- Raven Quinn (born 1984), American musician
- Ray Quinn (born 1988), English actor
- Ray Quinn (footballer) (1913–1973), Australian rules footballer
- Rebecca Quinn (disambiguation), multiple people
- Richard Quinn (disambiguation), multiple people
- Rick Quinn Jr. (born 1965), American politician
- Rob Quinn (born 1976), Irish footballer
- Robert Quinn (disambiguation), multiple people
- Rocco Quinn (born 1986), Scottish footballer
- Roderic Quinn (1867–1949), Australian poet
- Rodney Quinn (born 1960), Australian jockey
- Roman Quinn (born 1993), American baseball player
- Romaine Quinn (born 1990), American politician
- Ron Quinn (born 1961), Australian rugby league footballer
- Roseann Quinn (1944–1973), American teacher
- Roy Quinn (1919–2001), Australian rules footballer
- Ruairi Quinn (born 1946), Irish politician
- Ryan Quinn (born 1987), American martial artist
- Ryan Quinn (curler) (born 1978), American curler
- Ryder Quinn (born 2005), Australian racing driver

=== S ===
- Sally Quinn (born 1941), American journalist and author
- San Quinn (born 1977), American rapper
- Seabury Quinn (1889–1969), American author
- Seamus Quinn, Irish Gaelic footballer
- Sean Quinn (disambiguation), multiple people
- Shawn Quinn, American bridge player
- Sheila Quinn (1920–2016), British nurse
- Sinéad Quinn (born 1980), Irish singer
- Snoozer Quinn (1907–1949), American jazz guitarist
- Stephen Quinn (born 1986), Irish footballer
- Steve Quinn (born 1946), American football player
- Steve Quinn (rugby league) (1951–2016), English rugby league footballer
- Susan Quinn (born 1940), American writer

=== T ===
- Tad Quinn (1881–1946), American baseball player
- Tadhg Ó Cuinn (fl. October 1415), Irish scribe and author
- Talesha Quinn (born 1989), Australian rugby league footballer
- Ted Quinn (born 1958), American musician
- Teddy Quinn (born 1958), American performer
- Terence J. Quinn (1836–1878), American politician
- Thomas Quinn (disambiguation), multiple people
- Tim Quinn (born 1949), Australian politician
- TJ Quinn (born 2003), American football player
- T. J. Quinn, American investigative reporter
- Tom Quinn (disambiguation), multiple people
- Tomás Quinn, Irish Gaelic footballer
- Tommie Quinn (1927–1970), Argentine field hockey player
- Tommy Quinn (1908–1969), Australian rules footballer
- Tony Quinn (disambiguation), multiple people
- Trey Quinn (born 1995), American football player
- T. Vincent Quinn (1903–1982), American politician

=== W ===
- Wayne Quinn (born 1976), English footballer
- William Quinn (disambiguation), multiple people
- Wimpy Quinn (1918–1954), American baseball player

=== Z ===
- Zebb Quinn (1981–2000), American murder victim
- Zoë Quinn (born 1987), American video game developer

== Fictional characters ==
- Billy Quinn, a character in the 1989 American-Canadian fantasy drama movie Prancer
  - Rachel Quinn, Corbin's wife, a character in Chrononauts and Chrononauts: Futureshock
  - Matilda Quinn, Corbin's and Rachel's daughter, a character in Chrononauts: Futureshock
- Daniel Quinn, the main character in Paul Auster's City of Glass, the first of three novels in The New York Trilogy
- Doctor Quentin Q. Quinn in Sealab 2021
- Michaela A. Quinn, in the American television series Dr. Quinn, Medicine Woman
- Harley Quinn, a DC comics character
- Joey Quinn, a police detective in Dexter
- Jonas Quinn in the sci-fi television series Stargate SG-1
- Love Quinn, a character in the American psychological thriller television series You
- Roberta "Summer" Quinn, a character in the American action drama TV series Baywatch
- Robbie Quinn in the soap opera Fair City
- Tom Quinn (Spooks), the lead character in the British spy-thriller series Spooks

== See also ==
- Attorney General Quinn (disambiguation)
- General Quinn (disambiguation)
- Governor Quinn (disambiguation)
- Quinn (soccer) (born 1995), Canadian soccer player
- O'Quinn
- Quin (disambiguation)
- Quinn (given name)
- Irish clans
