= Uruguay names in space =

There are a number of objects in the Solar System that have been named after Uruguay people or places. Many of these are asteroids.

== Asteroids ==
As of October 2026, there are 4 asteroids named after Uruguayan people, all of which are located in the main asteroid belt between Mars and Jupiter

Near-Earth obj.	MBA (inner)	MBA (outer)	Centaur
Mars-crosser	MBA (middle)	Jupiter trojan	Trans-Neptunian obj.
Unclassified

back to top

Named minor planet	Provisional	This minor planet was named for...	Ref · Catalog
5088 Tancredi	1985 RS_{3} 1982 DP_{6} 1979 QZ_{1}	Gonzalo Tancredi (born 1963), Uruguayan astronomer from the Universidad de la República, and IAU member who obtained the body's first rotational lightcurve	· 5088
5996 Julioangel	1983 NR; 1979 OH_{14} 1961 CT	Julio Ángel Fernández (born 1946), Uruguayan astronomer from the Universidad de la República. He worked on the evolution of comet orbits and planetesimal scattering in the outer solar system, including the formation of the Oort Cloud. Since 1985, he has contributed to the reestablishment of Uruguayan astronomy by educating a vigorous group of young planetary scientists and dynamicists	· 5996
9478 Caldeyro	2148 P-L; 1996 ET_{8}	Roberto Caldeyro-Barcia (1921–1996), Uruguayan physiologist	· 9478
10691 Sans	1981 EJ_{19}	Juan Diego Sans (1922–2005) was a Uruguayan professor and public communicator of astronomy at the Universidad de la República. He was co-founder of the Asociación de Aficionados a la Astronomía and president of the Sociedad Uruguaya de Astronomía.	· 10691
