= Patrick Quinn =

Patrick Quinn may refer to:

- Patrick Quinn (actor) (1950–2006), American actor
- Patrick Quinn (priest) (fl. 1600s), Irish Roman Catholic priest
- Patrick Quinn (Metropolitan Police officer) (1855–1936), Irish police officer
- Patrick Quinn (Australian politician) (1862–1926), Australian politician
- Patrick Quinn (athlete) (1885–1946), British track and field athlete
- C. Patrick Quinn (1900–?), Member of the Michigan House of Representatives
- Patrick Quinn (Garda) (1904–1976), Irish police officer
- Patrick Quinn (Irish republican) (born 1962), member of the Irish Republican Army
- Patrick Quinn (ALS activist) (1983–2020), American activist

== See also ==
- Pádraig Ó Cuinn (1899–1974), Irish Republican Army General
- Paddy Quinn (disambiguation)
- Pat Quinn (disambiguation)
- Patricia Quinn (disambiguation)
