= Tom Quinn =

Tom Quinn may refer to:

- Tom Quinn (actor) (1934–2014), American actor in television and movies
- Tom Quinn (American football) (born 1968), American football coach
- Tom Quinn (astrophysicist), professor in the Department of Astronomy at the University of Washington (Seattle)
- Tom Quinn (baseball) (1864–1932), American baseball player
- Tom Quinn (footballer, born 1947), Australian rules footballer for Melbourne
- Tom Quinn (nurse), English nurse
- Tom Quinn (Spooks), a fictional television character
- Tom Quinn (runner) (born 1918), winner of the mile at the 1948 USA Indoor Track and Field Championships
- Tom Quinn, co-founder of American film production and distribution company Neon
- Tommy Quinn (1908–1969), Australian rules footballer for Geelong

== See also ==
- Thomas Quinn (disambiguation)
