= Thomas Quinn =

Thomas Quinn may refer to:

- Thomas Quinn (author) (born 1951), author of historical novels
- Thomas Quinn (MP) (1838–1897), Irish Nationalist politician and builder
- Thomas C. Quinn, American physician and infectious disease researcher
- T. Vincent Quinn (1903–1982), U.S. representative from New York
- T. J. Quinn (Thomas Joseph Quinn), American investigative reporter
- Thomas Emmett Quinn, Canadian ice hockey executive, coach and referee

== See also ==
- Tom Quinn (disambiguation)
