= John Quinn =

John or Jack Quinn may refer to:

== Politicians and lawyers ==
- John Quinn (advocate) (1954–2022), attorney general of the Isle of Man
- John Quinn (collector) (1870–1924), lawyer, collector of manuscripts and paintings, friend of T. S. Eliot and Ezra Pound
- John Quinn (Missouri politician) (born 1950), member of the Missouri House of Representatives
- John Quinn (New York politician) (1839–1903), congressman from New York
- John B. Quinn (born 1951), American lawyer
- John F. Quinn (born 1963), Massachusetts state representative
- John R. Quinn (politician) (1889–1979), served on the Los Angeles County Board of Supervisors
- Jack Quinn (lawyer) (1949–2024), White House counsel, 1995–1996
- Jack Quinn (politician) (born 1951), congressman from New York
- Jack Quinn III (born 1978), assemblyman from Erie County, New York and son of the congressman

== Sportsmen ==
- John Quinn (baseball executive) (1908–1976), baseball general manager
- John Quinn (Canterbury cricketer) (born 1970), New Zealand cricketer
- John Quinn (catcher) (1885–1956), baseball catcher for the 1911 Philadelphia Phillies
- John Quinn (footballer) (1938–2020), English professional footballer, 1959–1976
- John Quinn Sr. (1875–1954), Australian rules footballer
- John Quinn (umpire) (1897–1968), baseball umpire
- John Quinn (Wellington cricketer) (1889-1967), New Zealand cricketer
- John Quinn (wrestler) (1941–2019), Canadian professional wrestler
- Johnny Quinn (born 1983), American football wide receiver
- Jack Quinn (baseball) (1883–1946), baseball pitcher
- Jack Quinn (footballer, born 1874) (1874–1918), Australian footballer with Geelong
- Jack Quinn (footballer, born 1918) (1918–2006), Australian rules footballer with South Melbourne, Richmond and Melbourne
- Jack Quinn (Gaelic footballer) (born 1943), Meath Gaelic football player
- Jack Quinn (ice hockey) (born 2001), Canadian ice hockey forward
- Jack Quin (1890–1953), Scottish footballer

== Other occupations ==
- John Quinn (diplomat) (1919–1961), Australian diplomat
- John Quinn (physicist) (1933–2018), American theoretical physicist
- John Quinn (producer), American TV producer and game show showrunner
- John A. Quinn (1932–2016), professor of chemical and biomolecular engineering
- John C. Quinn (1925–2017), American journalist
- John M. Quinn (born 1945), Roman Catholic bishop
- John M. J. Quinn (1886–1955), monsignor
- John R. Quinn (bishop) (1929–2017), Roman Catholic archbishop
- Jonny Quinn (born 1972), drummer for Snow Patrol

== Characters ==
- John Quinn, character in The Southern Vampire Mysteries
- Jack Quinn, character in the 1997 action film Double Team
- John Quinn, a minor antagonist in the seventh season of 24

== See also ==
- Jonathan Quinn (born 1975), former American football quarterback
- John O'Quinn (1941–2009), Texas lawyer
- Sean Quinn (disambiguation)
