= Mary Quinn =

Mary Quinn may refer to:

- Mary Alice Quinn (1920–1935), girl from Chicago, Illinois, described as "Chicago's Miracle Child" and "Chicago's Unofficial Saint"
- Mary Ellen Quinn (born 1949), American librarian

== See also ==
- Mary Quin (fl. 1990s–2010s), United States-New Zealand executive, hostage, and author
