= 10476 Los Molinos =

Main-belt asteroid

Discovery
- Discovered by: S. J. Bus
- Discovery site: Siding Spring Obs.
- Discovery date: 2 March 1981

Designations
- Named after: Los Molinos Observatory (Uruguayan observatory)
- Alternative designations: 1981 EY_{38} · 1978 NB_{3}
- Minor planet category: main-belt · (inner) background

Orbital characteristics
- Epoch 23 March 2018 (JD 2458200.5)
- Uncertainty parameter 0
- Observation arc: 39.31 yr (14,358 days)
- Aphelion: 2.9165 AU
- Perihelion: 1.7185 AU
- Semi-major axis: 2.3175 AU
- Eccentricity: 0.2585
- Orbital period (sidereal): 3.53 yr (1,289 days)
- Mean anomaly: 95.559°
- Mean motion: 0° 16^{m} 45.84^{s} / day
- Inclination: 9.4472°
- Longitude of ascending node: 249.86°
- Argument of perihelion: 38.678°

Physical characteristics
- Dimensions: 2.853±0.014 km 2.96 km (calculated)
- Synodic rotation period: 267.906±1.9703 h
- Geometric albedo: 0.20 (assumed); 0.3424±0.0425
- Spectral type: S
- Absolute magnitude (H): 14.4 · 14.556±0.003 (R) · 14.6 · 15.01 · 15.33±0.50

10476 Los Molinos (provisional designation 1981 EY_{38}) is a stony background asteroid and slow rotator from the inner regions of the asteroid belt, approximately 2.9 kilometers (1.8 miles) in diameter. It was discovered on 2 March 1981, by American astronomer Schelte Bus at the Siding Spring Observatory in Australia. The asteroid was named for the Los Molinos Observatory in Uruguay.

== Orbit and classification ==
Los Molinos is a non-family asteroid from the main belt's background population. It orbits the Sun in the inner asteroid belt at a distance of 1.7–2.9 AU once every 3 years and 6 months (1,289 days; semi-major axis of 2.32 AU). Its orbit has an eccentricity of 0.26 and an inclination of 9° with respect to the ecliptic. The body's observation arc begins with its first observations as 1978 NB_{3} at Crimea–Nauchnij in July 1978.

== Physical characteristics ==
Based on its high albedo and its location within the asteroid belt, Los Molinos is an assumed S-type asteroid.

=== Rotation period ===
In August 2010, a rotational lightcurve of Los Molinos was obtained from photometric observations in the R-band by astronomers at the Palomar Transient Factory in California. Lightcurve analysis gave a rotation period of 267.906±1.9703 hours with a brightness amplitude of 0.33 magnitude (U=2). This makes Los Molinos one of the top 200 slow rotators known to exist.

=== Diameter and albedo ===
According to the survey carried out by the NEOWISE mission of NASA's Wide-field Infrared Survey Explorer, Los Molinos measures 2.853 kilometers in diameter and its surface has a high albedo of 0.34.

The Collaborative Asteroid Lightcurve Link assumes a standard albedo for stony asteroids of 0.20 and calculates a diameter of 2.96 kilometers based on an absolute magnitude of 15.01.

== Naming ==
This minor planet was named after the Los Molinos Observatory (844) located near Montevideo in Uruguay. The observatory is known for its astrometric follow-up observations of asteroids and comets. The official naming citation was published by the Minor Planet Center on 13 April 2017 (M.P.C. 103975/103976).
