= 1937 Major League Baseball All-Star Game =

1937 American baseball competition

	1	2	3	4	5	6	7	8	9	R	H	E
National League	0	0	0	1	1	1	0	0	0	3	13	0
American League	0	0	2	3	1	2	0	0	X	8	13	2
- Date: July 7, 1937
- Venue: Griffith Stadium
- City: Washington, D.C.
- Managers: Bill Terry (NYG); Joe McCarthy (NYY)
- Attendance: 31,391
- Ceremonial first pitch: President Franklin D. Roosevelt
- Radio: CBS; NBC; Mutual
- Radio announcers: France Laux, Bill Dyer and Arch McDonald (CBS); Tom Manning and Warren Brown (NBC); Bob Elson and Tony Wakeman (Mutual)

The 1937 Major League Baseball All-Star Game was the fifth playing of the midsummer classic between the All-Stars of the American League (AL) and National League (NL), the two leagues comprising Major League Baseball. The game was held on July 7, 1937, at Griffith Stadium in Washington, D.C., the home of the Washington Senators of the American League. The American League defeated the National League, 8 to 3.

The game, attended by President Franklin D. Roosevelt, is remembered because of a play in which Earl Averill of the Indians hit a ball that struck Cardinals pitcher Dizzy Dean on the toe, breaking it; complications from this injury shortened the career of the future Hall of Fame pitcher.

== Rosters ==
Players in italics have since been inducted into the National Baseball Hall of Fame.

=== National League ===
Starters
Position	Player	Team	All-Star Games
P	Dizzy Dean	Cardinals	4
C	Gabby Hartnett	Cubs	5
1B	Johnny Mize	Cardinals	1
2B	Billy Herman	Cubs	4
3B	Arky Vaughan	Pirates	4
SS	Dick Bartell	Giants	2
LF	Joe Medwick	Cardinals	4
CF	Frank Demaree	Cubs	2
RF	Paul Waner	Pirates	4

Pitchers
Position	Player	Team	All-Star Games
P	Cy Blanton	Pirates	1
P	Lee Grissom	Reds	1
P	Carl Hubbell	Giants	5
P	Van Mungo	Dodgers	3
P	Bucky Walters	Phillies	1

Reserves
Position	Player	Team	All-Star Games
C	Ernie Lombardi	Reds	2
C	Gus Mancuso	Giants	2
1B	Ripper Collins	Cubs	3
2B	Burgess Whitehead	Giants	2
SS	Billy Jurges	Cubs	1
OF	Pepper Martin	Cardinals	4
OF	Gene Moore	Bees	1
OF	Jo-Jo Moore	Giants	4
OF	Mel Ott	Giants	4

=== American League ===
Starters
Position	Player	Team	All-Star Games
P	Lefty Gomez	Yankees	5
C	Bill Dickey	Yankees	4
1B	Lou Gehrig	Yankees	5
2B	Charlie Gehringer	Tigers	5
3B	Red Rolfe	Yankees	1
SS	Joe Cronin	Red Sox	4
LF	Sam West	Browns	5
CF	Earl Averill	Indians	5
RF	Joe DiMaggio	Yankees	2

Pitchers
Position	Player	Team	All-Star Games
P	Tommy Bridges	Tigers	4
P	Wes Ferrell	Senators	2
P	Lefty Grove	Red Sox	4
P	Mel Harder	Indians	4
P	Johnny Murphy	Yankees	1
P	Monty Stratton	White Sox	1

Reserves
Position	Player	Team	All-Star Games
C	Rick Ferrell	Senators	5
C	Luke Sewell	White Sox	1
1B	Jimmie Foxx	Red Sox	5
1B	Hank Greenberg	Tigers	1
2B	Buddy Myer	Senators	2
3B	Harlond Clift	Browns	1
OF	Beau Bell	Browns	1
OF	Doc Cramer	Red Sox	2
OF	Wally Moses	Athletics	1
OF	Gee Walker	Tigers	1

== Game ==
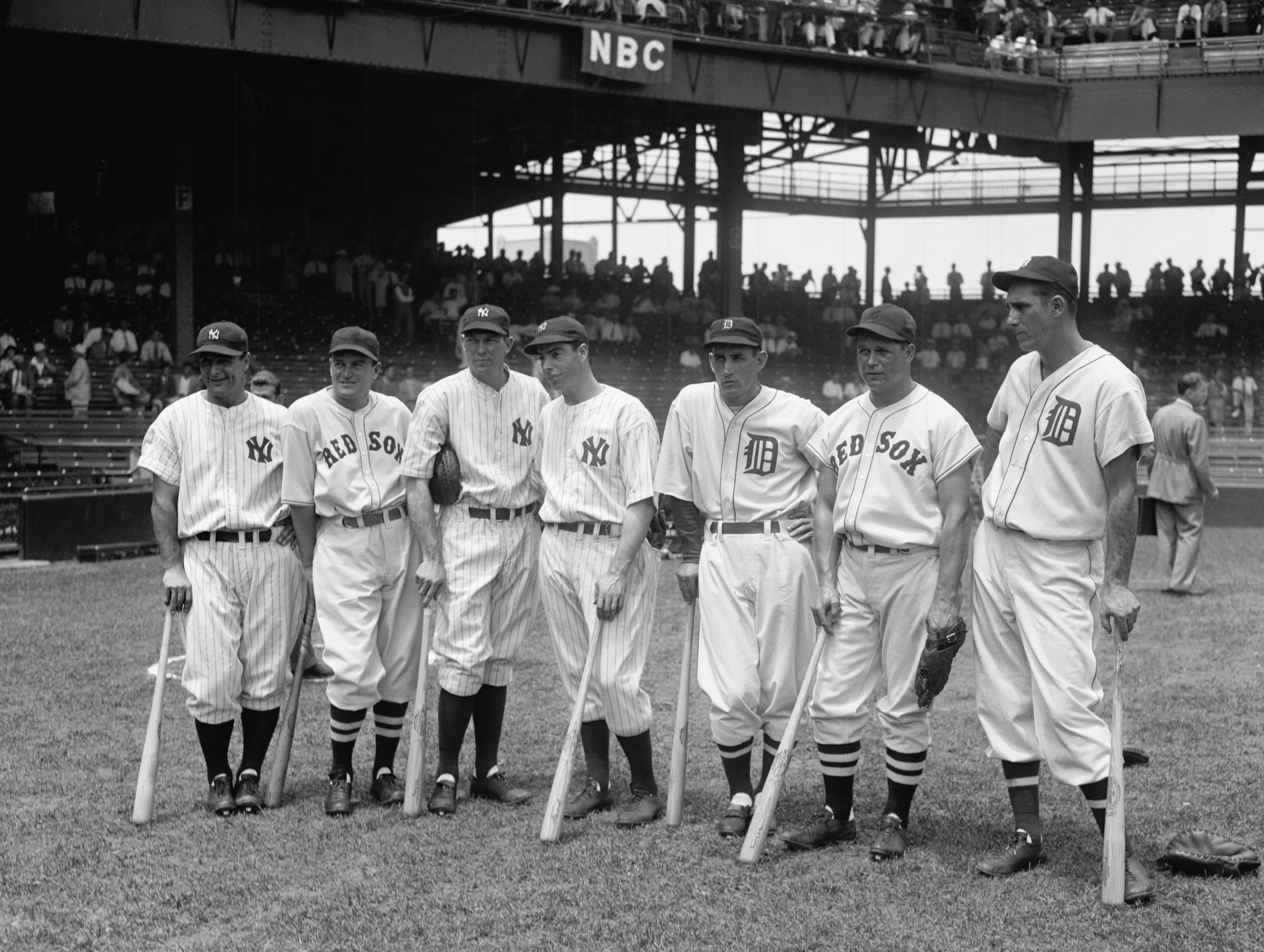
Seven of the American League All-Star players, from left to right Lou Gehrig, Joe Cronin, Bill Dickey, Joe DiMaggio, Charlie Gehringer, Jimmie Foxx, and Hank Greenberg. All seven would eventually be elected to the Hall of Fame.

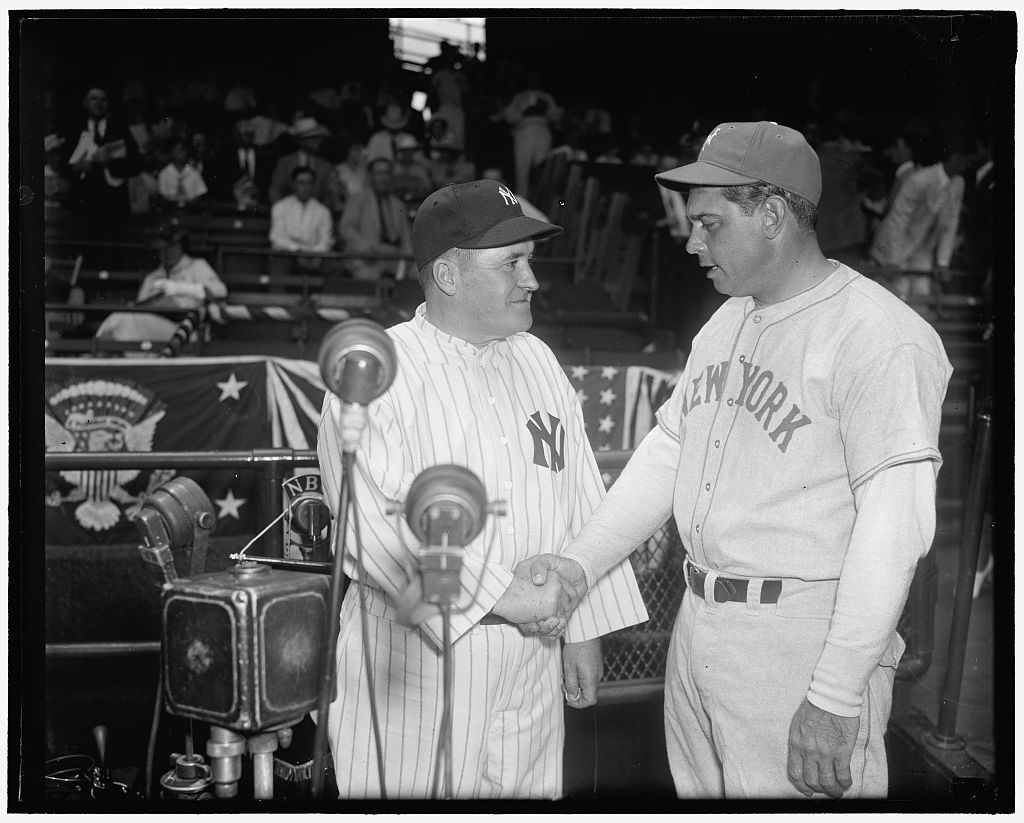
All-Star Game managers Joe McCarthy (left) and Bill Terry (right).

=== Umpires ===
Position	Umpire	League
Home Plate	Bill McGowan	American
First Base	Babe Pinelli	National
Second Base	John Quinn	American
Third Base	George Barr	National

The umpires changed assignments in the middle of the fifth inning – McGowan and Barr swapped positions, also Pinelli and Quinn swapped positions.

=== Starting lineups ===
National League				American League			
Order	Player	Team	Position	Order	Player	Team	Position
1	Paul Waner	Pirates	RF	1	Red Rolfe	Yankees	3B
2	Billy Herman	Cubs	2B	2	Charlie Gehringer	Tigers	2B
3	Arky Vaughan	Pirates	3B	3	Joe DiMaggio	Yankees	RF
4	Joe Medwick	Cardinals	LF	4	Lou Gehrig	Yankees	1B
5	Frank Demaree	Cubs	CF	5	Earl Averill	Indians	CF
6	Johnny Mize	Cardinals	1B	6	Joe Cronin	Red Sox	SS
7	Gabby Hartnett	Cubs	C	7	Bill Dickey	Yankees	C
8	Dick Bartell	Giants	SS	8	Sam West	Browns	LF
9	Dizzy Dean	Cardinals	P	9	Lefty Grove	Red Sox	P

=== Game summary ===
Wednesday, July 7, 1937 1:30 pm (ET) at Griffith Stadium in Washington, D.C.
Team	1	2	3	4	5	6	7	8	9	R	H	E
National League	0	0	0	1	1	1	0	0	0	3	13	0
American League	0	0	2	3	1	2	0	0	-	8	13	2
WP: Lefty Gomez (1–0) LP: Dizzy Dean (0–1) Sv: Mel Harder (1); Home runs: NL: None; AL: Lou Gehrig (1)
