= James Quinn =

James, Jim, or Jimmy Quinn may refer to:

== Sportspeople ==
- James Quinn (athlete) (1906–2004), gold medal-winning American athlete at the 1928 Summer Olympics
- James Quinn (footballer, born 1974), ex-Blackpool F.C. and Northern Irish international footballer
- Bob Quinn (baseball, born 1870) (James Aloysius Robert Quinn, 1870–1954), American executive in Major League Baseball
- Jim Quinn (Australian footballer) (1904–1986), Australian footballer for Essendon
- Jimmy Quinn (footballer, born 1878) (1878–1945), Celtic and Scotland centre-forward
- Jimmy Quinn (footballer, born 1947) (1947–2002), Scottish footballer, grandson of the footballer born 1878
- Jimmy Quinn (footballer, born 1959), Northern Ireland international footballer
- Jimmy Quinn (jockey) (born 1967), Irish jockey

== Other ==
- James Quinn (bishop) (1819–1881), the first Roman Catholic Archbishop of Brisbane
- James Quinn (director), American film and television director
- James Quinn (film administrator) (1919–2008), British film administrator, producer and exhibitor
- James Quinn (Irish criminal), Irish criminal who took part in the murder of Gary Hutch, starting the Hutch–Kinahan feud
- James Quinn (Jesuit) (1919–2010), Scottish priest and hymn writer
- James Aiden O'Brien Quinn, Irish-born lawyer and expatriate judge
- James Brian Quinn (1928–2012), American academic and author
- James H. Quinn (1857–1930), American jurist
- James J. Quinn (Irish Army officer) (1918–1982), general in Irish Army and United Nations
- James L. Quinn (editor), American science fiction editor and publisher
- James L. Quinn (politician) (1875–1960), U.S. Representative from Pennsylvania
- James O'Donnell Quinn (1906–?), politician in British Columbia, Canada
- James Peter Quinn (1869–1951), Australian World War I war artist
- James Quinn, maker of the documentary Nazi Pop Twins
- James Quinn, actor in British sitcom Early Doors
- Jim Quinn (1943–2025), American radio talk show host
- Jim Quinn (New Brunswick politician), Canadian Senator
- Jim Quinn, one of two Irish boys who discovered the Ardagh Hoard in 1868

== See also ==
- Alexander James Quinn (1932–2013), bishop of the Catholic Church in the United States
- James Quin (1693–1766), English actor of Irish descent
