= Sam West =

American baseball player (1904–1985)

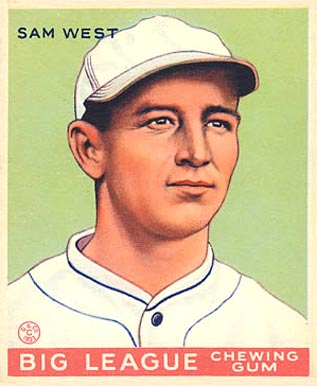
- Center fielder
- Born: October 5, 1904; Longview, Texas, U.S.
- Died: November 23, 1985 (aged 81); Lubbock, Texas, U.S.
- Batted: Left Threw: Left

MLB debut
- April 17, 1927, for the Washington Senators

Last MLB appearance
- September 24, 1942, for the Chicago White Sox

MLB statistics
- Batting average: .299
- Home runs: 75
- Runs batted in: 838
- Stats at Baseball Reference

Teams
- Washington Senators (1927–1932); St. Louis Browns (1933–1938); Washington Senators (1938–1941); Chicago White Sox (1942)

Career highlights and awards
- 4× All-Star (1933–1935, 1937)

Samuel Filmore West (October 5, 1904 – November 23, 1985) was an American professional baseball center fielder in Major League Baseball who played for three different teams from 1927 to 1942. Listed at 5 ft 11 in (1.80 m), 165 lb., West batted and threw left-handed. He was born in Longview, Texas.

West entered the majors in 1927 with the Washington Senators, playing six years for them before moving to the St. Louis Browns (1933–1938), again with Washington (1938–1941), and the Chicago White Sox (1942). His most productive season came in 1931 when he posted a career-high .333 batting average and reached career highs in slugging percentage (.481), hits (175), doubles (43), triples (13), and rbi (91). In 1933, he was selected to the first All-Star Game ever played, being selected again in 1934, 1935 and 1937.

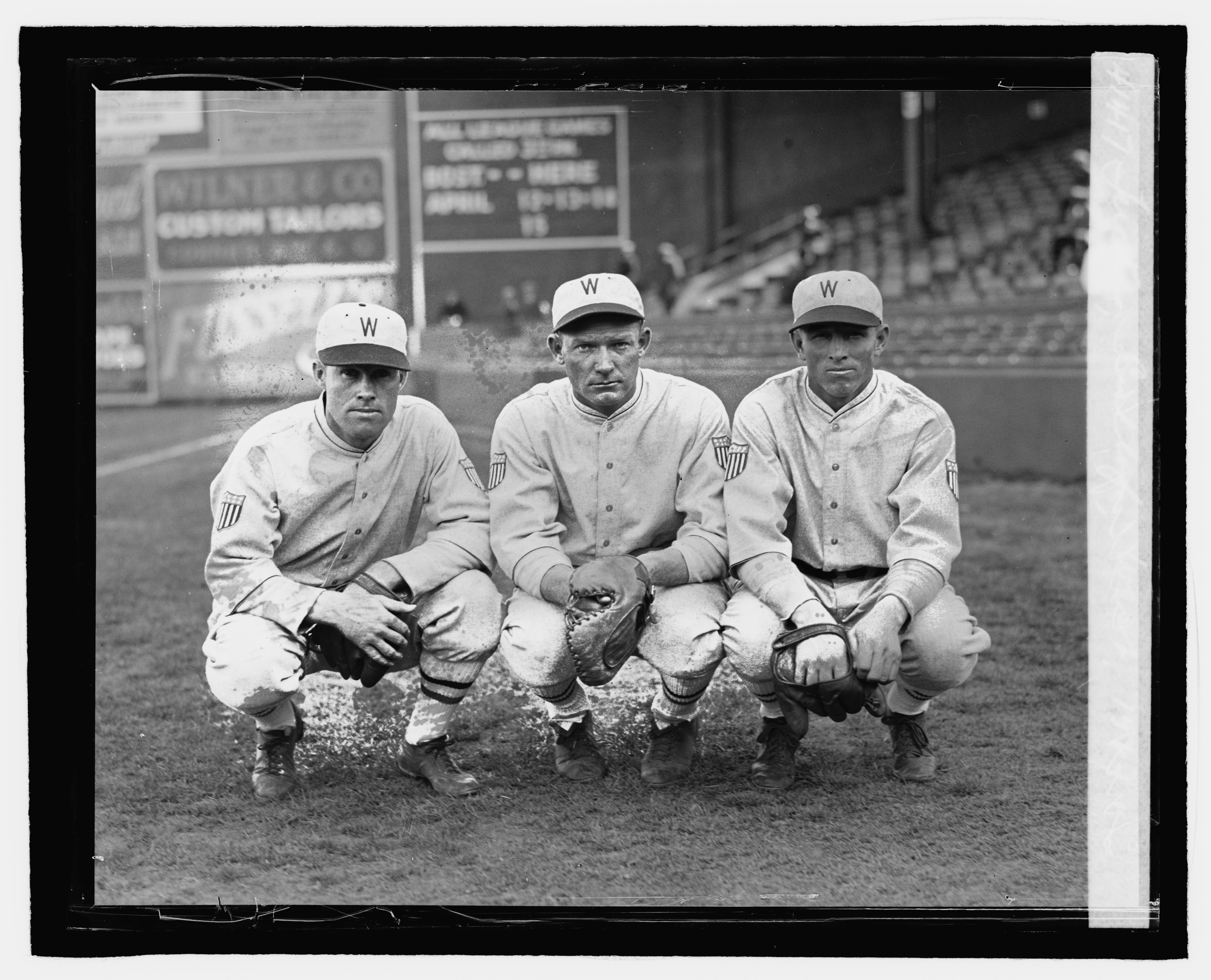

During his career, West collected a .300 average during eight seasons; led AL outfielders in putouts twice, double plays three times, and assists once, and four times was considered in the AL Most Valuable Player vote. Although he played with Washington during ten seasons, he missed the American League pennant-winning team that lost the 1933 World Series to the New York Giants after being traded to the Browns in exchange for Goose Goslin.

On April 13, 1933, as a member of the St. Louis Browns, West went 6-for-6 against the Chicago White Sox in a losing effort at Sportsman's Park.

In a sixteen-season career, West was a .299 hitter (1838-for-6148) with 75 home runs and 838 RBI in 1753 games, including 934 runs, 347 doubles, 101 triples, 53 stolen bases, 696 walks, a .371 on-base percentage, and a .425 slugging percentage. Defensively, he posted a .983 fielding percentage. Following his playing career, West served in the U.S. Army during World War II. After discharge from the service, he spent three years as a coach with the Senators.

West died in Lubbock, Texas at age 81.

== See also ==
- List of Major League Baseball career triples leaders
- List of Major League Baseball single-game hits leaders
