= Billy Quinn =

Billy Quinn may refer to:

- Billy Quinn (footballer) (1890–?), Australian footballer for Melbourne
- Billy Quinn (hurler) (1935–2016), Irish retired hurler
- William Quinn (actor) (1884–1965), Canadian actor, sometimes credited as Billy Quinn
