= 5088 Tancredi =

Asteroid in the outer region of the asteroid belt

Discovery
- Discovered by: C.-I. Lagerkvist
- Discovery site: La Silla Obs.
- Discovery date: 22 August 1979

Designations
- Named after: Gonzalo Tancredi (Uruguayan astronomer)
- Alternative designations: 1979 QZ_{1} · 1982 DP_{6} 1985 RS_{3}
- Minor planet category: main-belt · Themis

Orbital characteristics
- Epoch 4 September 2017 (JD 2458000.5)
- Uncertainty parameter 0
- Observation arc: 37.60 yr (13,733 days)
- Aphelion: 3.5929 AU
- Perihelion: 2.6160 AU
- Semi-major axis: 3.1045 AU
- Eccentricity: 0.1573
- Orbital period (sidereal): 5.47 yr (1,998 days)
- Mean anomaly: 225.83°
- Mean motion: 0° 10^{m} 48.72^{s} / day
- Inclination: 0.5844°
- Longitude of ascending node: 5.7375°
- Argument of perihelion: 84.766°

Physical characteristics
- Dimensions: 12.81 km (derived); 15.939±0.137 km
- Synodic rotation period: 5.0591±0.0001 h
- Geometric albedo: 0.0695±0.0122; 0.08 (assumed)
- Spectral type: C
- Absolute magnitude (H): 12.36±0.07 (S) · 12.5 · 12.81

5088 Tancredi, provisional designation 1979 QZ_{1}, is a carbonaceous Themistian asteroid from the outer region of the asteroid belt, approximately 15 kilometers in diameter. It was discovered on 22 August 1979, by Swedish astronomer Claes-Ingvar Lagerkvist at ESO's La Silla Observatory in northern Chile. It is named after Uruguayan astronomer Gonzalo Tancredi.

== Orbit and classification ==
Tancredi is a dark C-type asteroid and member of the Themis family, a dynamical family of outer-belt asteroids with nearly coplanar ecliptical orbits. It orbits the Sun in the outer main-belt at a distance of 2.6–3.6 AU once every 5 years and 6 months (1,998 days). Its orbit has an eccentricity of 0.16 and an inclination of 1° with respect to the ecliptic. As no precoveries were taken, the asteroid's observation arc begins with its discovery observation in 1979.

== Lightcurve ==
In February 2009, a rotational lightcurve of Tancredi was obtained from photometric observations by Gonzalo Tancredi at the Los Molinos Observatory near Montevideo, Uruguay. It gave a rotation period of 5.0591±0.0001 hours with a brightness amplitude of 0.31 magnitude (U=3-).

== Diameter and albedo ==
According to the survey carried out by the NEOWISE mission of NASA's Wide-field Infrared Survey Explorer, Tancredi measures 15.9 kilometers in diameter and its surface has an albedo of 0.07, while the Collaborative Asteroid Lightcurve Link assumes an albedo of 0.08 and calculates a diameter of 12.8 kilometers using an absolute magnitude of 12.81.

== Naming ==
This minor planet was named after Gonzalo Tancredi (born 1963), the Uruguayan astronomer who also obtained the body's first rotational lightcurve. In 1993, he did his PhD at Uppsala Observatory, Sweden, and is now a professor of astronomy at Uruguay University and an active member of the IAU.

Tancredi was also a director of the Los Molinos Observatory (2004–2012). Using both observations and theoretical modeling, he works on the dynamical and physical evolution of comets and their interactions with minor planets in the Solar System. The approved naming citation was published by the Minor Planet Center on 1 September 1993 (M.P.C. 22506).
