= Paddy Quinn =

Paddy Quinn may refer to:

- Paddy Quinn (American football)
- Paddy Quinn (baseball) (1849–1909), American baseball player
- Paddy Quinn (Irish republican) (born 1962), IRA activist

== See also ==
- Patrick Quinn (disambiguation)
- Pat Quinn (disambiguation)
