= Anthony Quinn (disambiguation) =

Anthony Quinn (1915–2001) was a Mexican/American actor

Anthony Quinn may also refer to:

- Anthony Quinn (boxer) (born 1949), Irish boxer
- Anthony Quinn (judge) (died 2013), American judge
- Anthony Quinn (rugby league) (born 1983), Australian rugby league player
- Anthony Tyler Quinn (born 1962), American actor
- Anthony Quinn Warner (1957–2020), American domestic terrorist
- Tony Quinn (businessman) (born 1944), Irish entrepreneur
- Tony Quinn (footballer) (born 1959), retired English footballer
