= Joanna R. Quinn =

Canadian political scientist (born 1973)

- Born: 1973 (age 52–53)

Academic background
- Education: University of Waterloo (BA, 1996); Acadia University (MA, 1997); McMaster University (PhD, 2003)
- Thesis: The politics of acknowledgement: truth commissions in Uganda and Haiti (2003)
- Doctoral advisor: Rhoda Howard-Hassmann

Academic work
- Institutions: University of Western Ontario

Joanna R. Quinn (born 1973) is a Canadian political scientist. She is a Professor of political science and director of the Centre for Transitional Justice and Post-Conflict Reconstruction at the University of Western Ontario.

== Education ==
Quinn earned her Bachelor of Arts degree with Honours from the University of Waterloo, her Master's degree from Acadia University, and PhD from McMaster University. She wrote her thesis under the guidance of Rhoda Howard-Hassmann titled The Politics of Acknowledgement: Truth Commissions in Uganda and Haiti. Upon completing her master's degree, Quinn began conducting research in Uganda and Haiti. She has since carried out research in Fiji and Solomon Islands.

== Career ==
As a member of the political science department at the University of Western Ontario, Quinn became the inaugural director of Western's Africa Institute in 2011. She formed agreements with nearly 40 African universities to orchestrate ongoing research and "act as an inter-disciplinary institute dedicated to the critical essences of Africa: its people, land and experience." During the 2012–13 academic year, Quinn was awarded funding from the Western Interdisciplinary Development Initiatives Program for her project Building Teaching and Research Excellence Through the Africa Institute.

Quinn also founded the Centre for Transitional Justice and Post-Conflict Reconstruction in 2009, a centre of excellence in scholarship on transitional justice and post-conflict reconstruction. The TJ Centre is home to an Undergraduate Minor in Transitional Justice and Post-Conflict Reconstruction and a Collaborative Graduate Specialization in Transitional Justice and Post-Conflict Reconstruction. In 2010, the TJ Centre received substantial funding from Western University to develop these programs.

She was inducted as a member of the College of New Scholars, Artists and Scientists of the Royal Society of Canada in 2015. In 2018, Quinn was elected President of the College of New Scholars for a two-year term.

Quinn has been awarded SSHRC funding for projects including "Comparing Traditional Forms of Acknowledgement in Uganda and Fiji: Understanding Traditional Institutions and Their Utility in Social Rebuilding"; and "Collective Unsettlement and the Politics of Acknowledgement."

Her edited book Reconciliation(s): Transitional Justice in Postconflict Societies was published by McGill-Queens University Press in 2009. In 2010, UBC Press published The Politics of Acknowledgement: Truth Commissions in Uganda and Haiti. In February 2020, Quinn published a co-edited book with Samar El-Masri and Tammy Lambert, titled Transitional Justice in Comparative Perspective: Preconditions for Success. The book focused on ameliorating the pre-conditions that exist in post-conflict societies to make them more conducive to transitional justice efforts. Her next book, Thin Sympathy: A Strategy to Thicken Transitional Justice, was published by the University of Pennsylvania Press in 2021.

In early 2025, Quinn was awarded the King Charles III Coronation Medal in recognition of “significant contributions to Canada.”
