= Frank Quinn =

Frank Quinn may refer to:

- Frank Quinn (Australian footballer) (1893–1973), St Kilda FC player
- Frank Quinn (cricketer) (1915–1996), Irish cricketer
- Frank Quinn (footballer, born 1926) (1926–2008), Scottish footballer (Celtic, Dundee United)
- Frank Quinn (mathematician) (born 1946), American mathematician and professor of mathematics
- Frank Quinn (outfielder) (1876–1920), American outfielder in Major League Baseball
- Frank Quinn (pitcher) (1927–1993), American pitcher in Major League Baseball
- Frank Quinn (rugby union) (born 1954), Irish rugby union player

== See also ==
- Francis Quinn (1921–2019), American Roman Catholic bishop
- Francis Quinn (racing driver) (1903–1931), American racing driver
- Fran Quinn, American golfer
