= Tony Wakeman =

American sportscaster (1909–1953)

Charles Anthony Wakeman (October 22, 1909 – November 17, 1953) was an American sportscaster in Washington D.C. from 1936 to 1952.

== Early life ==
Wakeman attended high school in Pittsburgh. His first radio job came when he was 16 years old when he worked as the announcer for a teenage dance band show. He paid for his studies at Duquesne University by working as a radio announcer. After three years at Duquesne, Wakeman moved to Pennsylvania State University, where he played on the school's football team during their 1929 season.

== Broadcasting career ==
=== Pittsburgh ===
After Penn State, Wakeman resumed his broadcasting career in Pittsburgh. In 1935, he won the H. P. Davis Memorial Announcers Award, which was awarded to the Pittsburgh announcer considered to have outstanding “personality, adaptability, diction, voice and versatility”. In 1936 he called Pittsburgh Pirates games for KQV.

=== Washington D.C. ===
In 1936, Wakeman joined WOL in Washington D.C. He became first the play by play announcer for the Washington Redskins, when the franchise relocated to the city in 1937. That same year he began announcing boxing and wrestling matches from Turner's Arena. During his time as a wrestling announcer, Wakeman feuded with Laverne Baxter, which led to the two coming to blows. In 1942, Wakeman moved to WINX. On August 21, 1944, he was assaulted on-air by fellow WINX personality Sam Brown. Brown hit Wakeman with a leg of a piano bench during a dispute over who should announce the results of a horse race. Brown alleged that he only hit Wakeman in self defense after Wakeman slapped him. Both men were let go by the station and Wakeman moved over to WWDC. Brown, who was indicted on a charge of assault with a deadly weapon, pleaded guilty to the lesser charge of simple assault and was given probation. Wakeman hosted the Tony Wakeman All Sports Parade on WWDC until 1950, when he returned to WOL. His return to WOL was short lived as he left that summer to host a television version of the All Sports Parade on WTTG.

=== National work ===
Wakeman called the 1935 Major League Baseball All-Star Game for CBS Radio. He also called games 1 and 5 of the 1936 World Series and the 1937 Major League Baseball All-Star Game for Mutual Broadcasting System. He was a congressional correspondent for Mutual and Capitol Broadcasting Company.

== Death ==
In 1952, Wakeman moved to Miami, where he worked as a sports announcer at a radio station. On November 17, 1953, Wakeman died in Miami after a 7-month illness. He was 44 years old.
