= Joseph Quinn (disambiguation) =

Joseph Quinn (born 1994) is a British actor.

Joseph or Joe Quinn may also refer to:

- Joe Quinn (catcher) (c. 1856–1893), American baseball player
- Joseph F. Quinn (1857–1929), Massachusetts state court judge
- Joseph Quinn (1861–1887), New York wrestler and murder victim, see Murder of Joseph Quinn
- Joe Quinn (second baseman) (1864–1940), Australian-born baseball player and manager
- Joseph Andrew Quinn (1886–1939), American politician and lawyer
- Joseph Quinn (rugby union) (1888–1955), Irish international rugby union player
- Joseph R. Quinn (1932–2023), associate justice and chief justice of the Colorado Supreme Court
- Joey Quinn, fictional character in the television series Dexter

== See also ==
- Joaquín
