= Julio Ángel Fernández =

Uruguayan astronomer and teacher

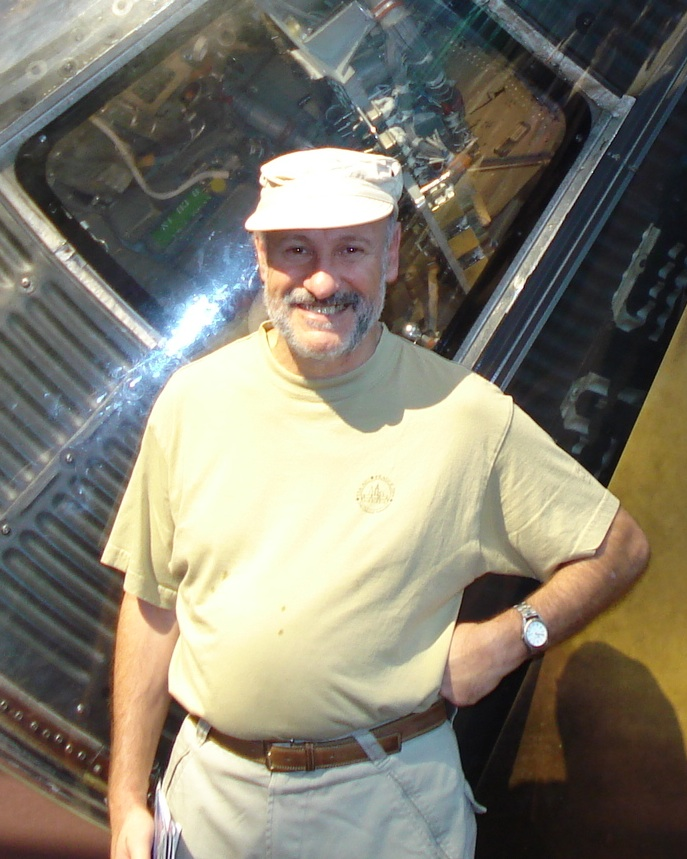
- Julio Ángel Fernández in 2008.
- Born: Julio Ángel Fernández Alves; 5 April 1946 (age 80); Montevideo
- Education: Universidad de la República
- Occupations: astronomer, teacher

Julio Ángel Fernández Alves (born 5 April 1946) is a Uruguayan astronomer and teacher, member of the department of astronomy at the Universidad de la República in Montevideo. He is also a member of PEDECIBA (the program for development of basic sciences in Uruguay) and the Uruguayan Society of Astronomy. From 2005 to 2010, he was the Dean of the Universidad de la Republica's Faculty of Sciences. The asteroid 5996 Julioangel, discovered in 1983, was named after him.

He is an active researcher of the Researchers National System of Uruguay.

Fernandez is member of the National Academy of Sciences of the United States.

== Kuiper belt ==
In 1980, in his paper On the existence of a comet belt beyond Neptune, Fernández proposed that periodic comets arrived too frequently into the inner Solar System to be accounted for solely by having arrived from the Oort cloud, and that a trans-Neptunian belt of comets at around 50 AU would be required to explain them. Subsequent computer models by Martin Duncan, Tom Quinn and Scott Tremaine in Canada supported the view, and led eventually to the discovery of the Kuiper belt. David C. Jewitt, who discovered the belt, believes that Fernández deserves more credit than anyone else, including Gerard Kuiper, for predicting its existence. He has subsequently published many papers on the trans-Neptunian population.

== Definition of planet ==
In 2006, Fernández was one of a number of dissenters at the IAU's meeting to establish the first definition of "planet." As an alternative to the IAU's draft proposal, which had included Pluto, its moon Charon and Ceres among the planets, Fernández with his Uruguayan colleague Gonzalo Tancredi proposed a definition where they reserved the term "planet" only for those objects in the Solar System which had cleared their neighbourhoods of planetesimals, describing those objects which had not cleared their orbits yet retained a spherical shape as "planetoids." The IAU's final definition incorporated much of Fernández and Tancredi's proposal, though the objects were christened "dwarf planets." The event originated the word "Plutoed," which was selected as the "word of the year 2006" by the American Dialect Society.

== Books ==
- Fernández, Julio Ángel (30 March 2006). Comets: Nature, Dynamics, Origin, and their Cosmogonical Relevance (e-book ed.). Springer. ISBN 978-1-4020-3495-4. Fernandez, Julio A. (2005). Comets: Nature, Dynamics, Origin, and their Cosmogonical Relevance (1st hardcover ed.). Springer. ISBN 978-1-4020-3490-9.
- Lazzaro, Daniela; Ferraz-Mello, Sylvio; Fernández, Julio Ángel, eds. (27 April 2006). Asteroids, Comets, and Meteors (IAU S229). Cambridge University Press. ISBN 9780521852005.
