= Roy Quinn =

Australian rules footballer

Personal information
- Full name: Royston Duggan Quinn
- Born: 18 June 1919; South Yarra, Victoria
- Died: 25 May 2001 (aged 81); Frankston, Victoria
- Original team: Ormond Amateur (VAFA)
- Height: 185 cm (6 ft 1 in)
- Weight: 81.5 kg (180 lb)

Playing career^{1}
Years	Club	Games (Goals)
1940-1941 & 1943–1944	Richmond	25 (25)
1945–1946	North Melbourne	19 (5)
Total		44 (30)
- ^{1} Playing statistics correct to the end of 1946.

Career highlights
- Richmond premiership player 1943

Royston Duggan Quinn (18 June 1919 – 25 May 2001) was an Australian rules footballer who played in the Victorian Football League (VFL) from 1940 to 1944 for the Richmond Football Club and then from 1945 until 1946 for the North Melbourne Football Club.

Quinn's father Billy Quinn played 11 VFL games for Melbourne Football Club in 1914.
