= Gonzalo Tancredi =

Uruguayan astronomer (born 1963)

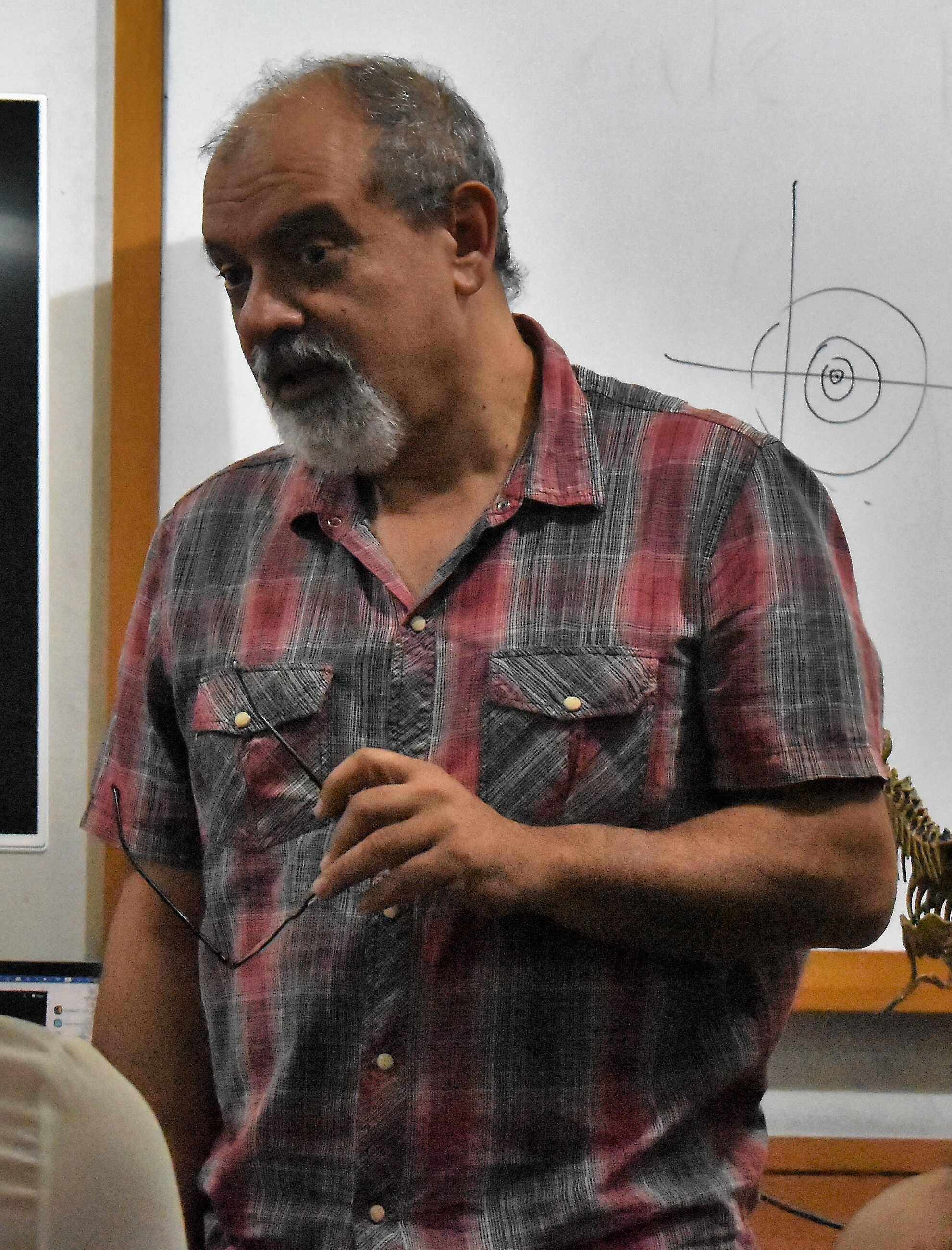
- Tancredi in 2022
- Born: March 8, 1963
- Known for: Often-cited list of dwarf planets
- Scientific career
- Fields: Astronomy
- Institutions: Los Molinos Observatory, Full Professor of Astronomy at the University of the Republic

Gonzalo Tancredi (born 8 March 1963) is a Uruguayan astronomer and full professor in the Department of Astronomy at the University of the Republic in Montevideo, Uruguay. He is an active member of the International Astronomical Union (IAU) and investigator at Los Molinos Observatory.

His 2010 evaluation of potential dwarf planets was considered by the IAU, though never acted on. The Themistian asteroid 5088 Tancredi has been named after him.

== Definition of planet ==
In 2006, Tancredi was one of a number of dissenters at the IAU's meeting to establish the first definition of "planet." As an alternative to the IAU's draft proposal, which had included Pluto, its moon Charon and Ceres among the planets, Tancredi with his Uruguayan colleague Julio Ángel Fernández proposed a definition where they reserved the term "planet" only for those objects in the Solar System which had cleared their neighbourhoods of planetesimals, describing those objects which had not cleared their orbits yet retained a spherical shape as "planetoids." The IAU's final definition incorporated much of Fernández and Tancredi's proposal, though the objects were christened "dwarf planets."
