= Marty Quinn =

Marty Quinn may refer to:

- Marty Quinn (footballer), Irish footballer and manager
- Marty Quinn (Illinois politician), alderman of the 13th ward in Chicago
- Marty Quinn (Oklahoma politician), American politician in Oklahoma
