= Keith Quinn =

Keith Quinn may refer to:

- Keith Quinn (broadcaster) (born 1946), New Zealand sports commentator
- Keith Quinn (footballer) (born 1988), Irish footballer

== See also ==
- Keith O'Quinn, American sports coach
