= Matthew Quinn =

Matthew Quinn may refer to:

- Matthew Quinn (bishop) (1821–1885), Australian suffragan bishop
- Matthew Quinn (sprinter) (born 1976), South African sprinter
- Matthew T. Quinn, American military officer and government official, Under Secretary of Veterans Affairs for Memorial Affairs

== See also ==
- Matt Quinn (born 1993), New Zealand cricketer
