= Nicholas Quinn (disambiguation) =

Nicholas Quinn (born 1993) is an Irish swimmer.

Nicholas Quinn may also refer to:

- Nicholas Quinn, the title character in The Silent World of Nicholas Quinn
- Nicholas Quinn, a character in High Stakes
- Nick Quinn, a character in Attorney for the Defense

== See also ==
- Nicholas Quinn Rosenkranz (born 1970), American Constitutional law scholar and Broadway producer
