= Michael Quinn =

Michael Quinn may refer to:

== Academics ==
- Michael Quinn (academic) (1922–2009), American academic and president of Saint Mary's College of California
- D. Michael Quinn (1944–2021), American historian
- Michael Quinn Patton (born 1945), American sociologist

== Performers ==
- Mick Quinn (born 1969), English musician
- Mike Quinn (puppeteer) (born 1964), English puppeteer and animator

== Sportspeople ==
- Michael Quinn (cricketer) (born 1962), Australian cricketer
- Michael Quinn (footballer) (born 1990), Gaelic football convert to Australian rules football
- Michael Quinn (Paralympian) (born 1963), Australian Paralympian
- Mick Quinn (rugby union) (born 1952), Irish former rugby union footballer
- Micky Quinn (born 1962), former English footballer, mainly for Portsmouth and Newcastle United
- Mike Quinn (born 1974), former American football quarterback
- Mike Quinn (ice hockey) (1874–1923), Canadian ice hockey coach and executive

== Other ==
- Michael Quinn (American politician), member of the Connecticut House of Representatives
- Michael Quinn (Australian politician) (1900–1965), Australian politician
- Michael Quinn (chef) (19??–2017), chef and charity worker
- Michael Quinn (judge), Irish High court judge and former solicitor
- Michael Joseph Francis Quinn, Canadian politician
- Michael Quinn Sullivan (born 1970), Texan columnist

== See also ==
- Mike Quin (1906–1947), CPUSA pen name of an American writer, born Paul William Ryan
