= John Quinn (umpire) =

American baseball umpire (1897-1968)

- Born: John Aloysius Quinn; August 29, 1897; Philadelphia, Pennsylvania, U.S.
- Died: July 4, 1968 (aged 70); Philadelphia, Pennsylvania, U.S.
- Occupation: Umpire
- Years active: 1935-1942
- Employer: American League
- Spouse: Marie Noble

John Aloysius Quinn (August 29, 1897 - July 4, 1968) was an American professional baseball umpire who worked in the American League from 1935 to 1942. Quinn was an umpire in the 1937 Major League Baseball All-Star Game. In his career, he umpired 1,247 Major League games.
