= Niall Quinn (disambiguation) =

Niall Quinn (born 1966), is an Irish former footballer and businessman.

Niall Quinn may also refer to:

- Niall Quinn (racing driver)
- Niall Quinn (born 1973), Irish musician, original singer of The Cranberries and drummer of The Hitchers
