= Joseph Quinn (rugby union) =

Irish rugby union player

Joseph Quinn MC
- Full name: Joseph Patrick Quinn
- Born: 23 November 1888 Dublin, Ireland
- Died: 9 June 1955 (aged 66) Nelson, Lancashire, England
- School: Trinity College Dublin
- Occupation: Medical doctor

Rugby union career
- Position: Wing three-quarter
International career
Years	Team	Apps	(Points)
1910–14	Ireland	15	(27)

Joseph Patrick Quinn (23 November 1888 — 9 June 1955) was an Irish international rugby union player.

Born in Dublin, Quinn was a resourceful wing three-quarter. He played his rugby for Dublin University and was capped 15 times for Ireland from 1910 to 1914, crossing for nine international tries. In 1913, Quinn became the first Ireland player to score a hat-trick against France, as part of a record 24–0 win at Mardyke Ground in Cork.

Quinn served with the Royal Army Medical Corps in World War I and was awarded the Military Cross.

A doctor, Quinn had a practice in Nelson, Lancashire.

== See also ==
- List of Ireland national rugby union players
