= Thomas Quinn (author) =

American novelist

- Born: 1951 (age 74–75); Newark, New Jersey, U.S.
- Education: Cornell University
- Occupation: Author
- Writing career
- Genres: Historical novels, political thriller
- Notable works: The Lion of St. Mark; The Sword of Venice; The Machiavelli Letter

Thomas Quinn (born 1951) is an author of historical novels.

== Biography ==
Quinn was born in Newark, New Jersey to Elmer and Barbara Quinn. He attended Cornell University 1969-1973 and graduated with a degree in Industrial and Labor Relations. He worked in sales and marketing for seventeen years for Procter & Gamble. Since then, he has been president of a division of the Irish Dairy Board and vice president for sales for Warner-Lambert Consumer Healthcare, CIGNA Healthcare, and Travel click. Quinn lives in Maryland.

He visited Venice in 1999 and decided to write his first book when he could not find a novel set there, similar to his favorite book, The Count of Monte Cristo. The first book in the trilogy, The Lion of St. Mark, took him four years to write and publish. It begins in 1452 with the attempt to save Constantinople from Turkish siege and ends in 1472. Much of the book concerns the rivalry between two powerful patrician families, the Zianis and the Soranzos and Venice's savage war with the Ottoman Turks. His second book, The Sword of Venice, spans the years 1473-1484 and chronicles the Ferrara War that pitted Venice against virtually all of her Italian rivals. The third book, working title: Venice Stands Alone, will continue the saga beginning in 1494 with French King Charles VIII's invasion of the Italian Peninsula, opposed by a Venice-led coalition of Italian states. Both are available in hard cover and eBook formats.

Quinn has recently completed his third novel, a modern-day political-action thriller entitled, The Machiavelli Letter. It was released in May 2012 as an eBook.

The first two books were published by Thomas Dunne Books, an imprint of St. Martin’s Press.

== The Venetian Trilogy ==
- The Lion of St. Mark (2005)
- The Sword of Venice (2007)

The first two books were published in Spanish: El león de san Marcos and La Espada De Venecia. The first book was also published in Greek: To Λιοντάρι του Αγίου Μάρκου.
