= Brian Quinn =

Brian Quinn may refer to:

- Brian Quinn (businessman), disgraced Australian businessman
- Brian Quinn (comedian) (born 1976), American comedian, television star and member of The Tenderloins
- Brian Quinn (economist) (born 1936), Scottish economist and former Celtic F.C. chairman
- Brian Quinn (hurler) (born 1972), Irish hurler
- Brian Quinn (soccer) (born 1960), Irish-American soccer player
