= Sean Quinn (disambiguation) =

Seán Quinn (born 1947) is an Irish businessman.

Sean Quinn may also refer to:

- Sean Quinn (cyclist) (born 2000), American cyclist
- Sean Quinn (writer) (born 1971)
- Sean Quinn, a character in Merry Happy Whatever

== See also ==
- John Quinn (disambiguation)
- San Quinn
- Shawn Quinn, bridge player
- Shawn Quinn (American football), American football coach
