= General Quinn =

General Quinn may refer to:

- Clark Quinn (fl. 1990s–2021s), U.S. Air Force major general
- James J. Quinn (Irish Army officer) (1918–1982), Irish Army major general
- Matthew T. Quinn (fl. 1990s–2021s), Montana National Guard general
- William Wilson Quinn (1907–2000), U.S. Army lieutenant general

== See also ==
- Attorney General Quinn (disambiguation)
