= Kevin Quinn =

Kevin Quinn may refer to:

- Kevin Quinn (actor) (born 1997), actor and singer, best known for Bunk'd
- Kevin Quinn (Jesuit) (born 1955), American Jesuit, lawyer and president of the University of Scranton
- Kevin Quinn (neo-Nazi) (born 1965), British neo-Nazi and leader of the November 9th Society
- Kevin Quinn (sportscaster) (born 1958), Canadian sportscaster for Rogers Sportsnet
- Kevin Quinn (sportsman) (1923–2002), Irish rugby union and cricket player
- Kevin Quinn (wrestler), American professional wrestler
- Kevin B. Quinn (born 1979 or 1980), American CEO of TransLink
- Kevin M. Quinn, U.S. Navy admiral
