= Tadhg Ó Cuinn =

Irish scribe and author (fl. October 1415)

Tadhg Ó Cuinn (fl. October 1415), was an Irish scribe and author. He is known for writing a Materia medica in October 1415. Little is known of his life apart from that.

== Materia medica ==
Ó Cuinn is chiefly known from a Materia medica he compiled in October 1415. According to the colophon at the end of the text, Tadhg Ó Chuinn, a bachelor in physics, completed the book on the feast of St. Luke in 1415, "drawn from the Antidotaries and Herbals of the city of Salerno, according to the united studium of the doctors of Montpellier". His "principal source, and the work whose format he followed, was the Liber de simplici medicina, usually known, from the opening words of the introduction, as Circa Instans. Joannes Platearius is named as the author of Circa Instans in the early printed versions of the text." His other sources were

- De Viribus Herbarum by Macer Floridus
- Liber dietarum particularium by Ysaac Israeli/Isaac Iudaeus)
- Book Two of the Liber aggregatus de medicinis singularibus of Avicenna's Canon de medicina.
- Book of Simple Medicines by Ibn Sarabi, otherwise Serapion the Younger.
- "Local sources. There is a number of items in the text for which no Latin sources have been found, and it is suggested in Chapter 4 that some of these may represent a purely Irish tradition."

This Materia Medica is of a high standard. At a rough check, it appears that, of the 208 plant simples and 29 plant products discussed, some two thirds are mentioned in the 12th edition of the Pharmacognosy of Trease and Evans as being relevant still or until recently, and another 15 were and are of nutritional value. That the author discusses only those drugs which he knew to be in use, is indicated by the drugs which are discussed in the Erlangen copy of Circa Instans, but which are not referred to in the Irish version. Of the 38 such drugs, 33 are foreign and obviously hard to come by, and only five are plants that occur in the Irish flora. The author was practical, too, in selecting information from his sources, He seems to give only those uses of the drug which he knew to be made in practice in this country. To mention an obvious case, he omits the numerous references to scorpion stings which occur in the Latin texts. On the other hand, he frequently mentions the mad dog when the Latin source does not.

The text appears to be no slavish rendering of the voice of ancient authority, but a sensible selection of information believed to be of practical use. It indicates the ailments that were known in the country at the time, and the drugs that were used in treating them.

== Editions ==
Prior to his death in July 1993, Micheál Ó Conchubhair spent his last five years making an edition of the text. At the time of his death, his translation and referencing of the Materia Medica was not quite complete, and he called his own manuscript an "interim edition". His family wanted his scholarship to be available to assist others researching the topic, and in 2018, it was made available online at the Corpus of Electronic Texts, and then launched at the Irish Conference of Medievalists in Cork on 27–29 June 2019.
