= Richard Quinn =

Richard Quinn may refer to:

- Richard Quinn (American football) (born 1986), American football tight end
- Richard Quinn (athlete) (1882–1925), British track and field athlete
- Richard Quinn (designer) (born 1990), British fashion and print designer
- Richard Quinn (jockey) (born 1961), Scottish jockey
- Richard Quinn (political consultant), Republican consultant from South Carolina
- Richard Quinn (born c. 1987), one of the Quinn brothers, killed in Northern Ireland, in 1998

== See also ==
- Richard Quine
