= Bob Quinn =

Bob, Rob, or Robert Quinn may refer to:

== Sportspeople ==
- Bob Quinn (American football) (born c. 1976), National Football League executive
- Bob Quinn (Australian footballer) (1915–2008), former Australian rules footballer with Port Adelaide in the SANFL
- Bob Quinn (baseball, born 1870) (1870–1954), American baseball executive
- Bob Quinn (baseball, born 1936), American baseball executive (and grandson of the above)
- Rob Quinn (born 1976), English footballer
- Robert Quinn (American football) (born 1990), American football defensive end

== Other uses ==
- Bob Quinn (Australian politician) (born 1947), Australian politician
- Bob Quinn (filmmaker) (born 1935), Irish filmmaker, writer and photographer
- Bob Quinn Lake Airport, British Columbia, Canada
- Robert E. Quinn (1894–1975), American politician from Rhode Island
- Robert H. Quinn (1928–2014), American politician from Massachusetts, active 1950s–1980s

== See also ==
- Robert Quine (1942–2004), American guitarist
