= Paul Quinn =

Paul Quinn may refer to:

- Paul Quinn (footballer, born 1961), Scottish footballer
- Paul Quinn (footballer, born 1985), Scottish footballer (Motherwell FC, Cardiff City, Aberdeen FC, Ross County)
- Paul Quinn (Missouri politician) (born 1943), member of the Missouri House of Representatives
- Paul Quinn (murder victim) (c. 1986–2007), murder victim.
- Paul Quinn (New Zealand politician), New Zealand rugby union player and politician
- Paul Quinn (rugby league, born 1938) (1938–2015), Australian rugby league footballer
- Paul Quinn (rugby league, born 1972), Australian rugby league footballer
- Paul Quinn (sex offender), British sex offender whose crimes led to another innocent man serving 17 years in prison.
- Paul Quinn (singer) (born 1959), Scottish singer, lead singer of Bourgie Bourgie
- Paul Quinn, English lead guitarist of the band Saxon
- Paul Quinn, Scottish drummer of the band The Soup Dragons

== See also ==
- Paul Quinn College, private, historically black college (HBCU) located in Dallas, Texas
- William Paul Quinn (1788–1873), African Methodist Episcopal bishop and namesake of Paul Quinn College
