= Governor Quinn =

Governor Quinn may refer to:

- Pat Quinn (politician) (born 1948), 41st Governor of Illinois
- Robert E. Quinn (1894–1975), 58th Governor of Rhode Island
- William F. Quinn (1919–2006), 12th Governor of the Territory of Hawaii and 1st Governor of Hawaii
