= Christopher Quinn =

Christopher Quinn may refer to:

- Christopher B. Quinn (born 1967), member of the Pennsylvania House of Representatives
- Christopher Dillon Quinn (born 1965), American film director, writer, and producer
- Chris Quinn (born 1983), American basketball player
- Chris Quinn (rugby league) (born 1968), Australian rugby league player
