= Frank Quinn (Australian footballer) =

Australian rules footballer (1893–1973)

Personal information
- Full name: Frank John Frederick Quinn
- Born: 11 July 1893; Cape Portland, Tasmania
- Died: 20 February 1973 (aged 79); Wonthaggi, Victoria

Playing career^{1}
Years	Club	Games (Goals)
1920	St Kilda	1 (1)
- ^{1} Playing statistics correct to the end of 1920.

Frank John Frederick Quinn (11 July 1893 – 20 February 1973) was an Australian rules footballer who played with St Kilda in the Victorian Football League (VFL).
