= Bernard Quinn =

Scottish footballer

Personal information
- Full name: Bernard Alexander Quinn
- Date of birth: 17 September 1947 (age 79)
- Place of birth: Govan, Scotland
- Position: Full back

Senior career*
Years	Team	Apps	(Gls)
1966	Queen of the South	1	(0)
- Ardeer Recreation
1967–1971	Queen's Park	22	(0)

International career
1968	Scotland Amateurs	2	(0)
- * Club domestic league appearances and goals

Bernard Alexander Quinn (born 17 September 1947) is a Scottish retired footballer who played as a full back in the Scottish League for Queen's Park and Queen of the South. He was capped by Scotland at amateur level.
