= Pat Quinn =

Pat Quinn may refer to:

- Pat Quinn (Australian rugby league) (died 1994), Australian rugby league footballer of the 1940s
- Pat Quinn (English rugby) (1930–1986), English rugby union and rugby league footballer of the 1950s
- Pat Quinn (businessman) (1935–2009), Irish businessman
- Pat Quinn (footballer) (1936–2020), Scottish footballer
- Pat Quinn (American actress) (born 1937), American actress
- Pat Quinn (ice hockey) (1943–2014), former NHL player and head coach
- Pat Quinn (writer) (born 1947), New Zealand children's author
- Pat Quinn (politician) (born 1948), Governor of Illinois from 2009 to 2015
- Pat Quinn (ALS activist) (1983–2020), American ALS activist

== See also ==
- Patricia Quinn (disambiguation)
- Patrick Quinn (disambiguation)
- Paddy Quinn (disambiguation)
