= John A. Quinn =

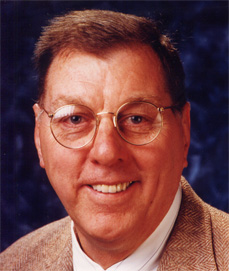
- Quinn in 2002
- Born: September 3, 1932; Springfield, IL
- Died: February 8, 2016 (aged 83)
- Citizenship: United States
- Education: University of Illinois; Princeton University
- Known for: Elucidation of mass transfer at interfaces and in membranes
- Spouse: Frances
- Children: 3
- Awards: National Academy of Engineering, 1978; American Academy of Arts and Sciences, 1992
- Scientific career
- Fields: Chemical Engineering
- Workplaces: University of Illinois; University of Pennsylvania
- Website: www.cbe.seas.upenn.edu/about-people/faculty/profile-quinn.php

John A. Quinn (3 September 1932 – 8 February 2016) was the Robert D. Bent Professor Emeritus of Chemical and Biomolecular Engineering at the University of Pennsylvania School of Engineering and Applied Science. He was a leader in the fields of mass transfer and membrane transport in synthetic membranes since the 1960s. In the early phase of his career at the University of Illinois, Quinn and his students devised simple, elegant experiments to elucidate the role of the interface in mass transfer between phases. In later work at Penn, he applied these insights to problems of engineering and biological significance involving chemical reaction and diffusion within and through both finely porous and reactive membranes. His chemical engineering science has informed matters as far afield as the separation of chiral pharmaceuticals and the behavior of cells at interfaces.

== Education and academic career ==
John Quinn received his B.S. in chemical engineering from the University of Illinois in 1954 and his Ph.D. in the same field from Princeton University in 1958 under Joe Elgin and Leon Lapidus. Upon receiving his doctorate, he returned to Illinois to join the faculty. Promotions to the ranks of associate professor followed in 1964, and then to full professor just two years later in 1966—the same year in which he was awarded the Allan P. Colburn Award of the American Institute of Chemical Engineers (AIChE) in recognition of his research publications. A dozen years later Quinn would receive AIChE's Alpha Chi Sigma Award.

In 1971, Quinn moved from Illinois to the University of Pennsylvania, where in 1978 he was designated the first recipient of its Robert D. Bent endowed professorship. He served Penn’s Department of Chemical and Biochemical Engineering as chairman from 1980 to 1985, a time that saw the early beginnings of a substantial shift in the field of chemical engineering to one that would eventually encompass and embrace many emerging areas of biology and biotechnology. Whereas the department had long been recognized as a center of classical biochemical/fermentation engineering due to the research programs of Arthur Humphrey (and subsequently Quinn) at Penn, Quinn was among the first of his peers to recognize the potential for applying the quantitative insights and methods of chemical engineering to the development and exploitation of a molecular-level understanding of biological components, systems, and processes. His tenure and leadership as chairman provided a platform for a substantial expansion of the departmental faculty and its areas of research into this “biomolecular” domain, culminating in 2003 with its name change to the “Department of Chemical and Biomolecular Engineering”.

AQuinn was visiting professor at Imperial College, London (1965-6 and 1986; visiting scientist at MIT (1980); Sherman Fairchild Scholar at Caltech (1985); and visiting professor at the University of Rome (1992). He also served as a member of several commissions and boards operating under the auspices of the National Research Council, including the Engineering Research Board, the Board of Chemical Sciences and Technology, the Committee on Separation Science and Technology, and the Amundson Committee on Chemical Engineering Frontiers.

== Scientific contributions ==
Quinn’s contributions to chemical engineering science and its applications pertain to a broad range of phenomena and processes:

The role of the interface in mass transfer: This work, largely conducted at Illinois, aimed at quantifying the magnitude of the mass transfer resistance hypothesized to exist at the nearly-infinitely-thin interface and to influence the rates of mass transport of species to and from bulk phases on either side of it. This very fundamental problem also engaged such contemporaries as Sherwood at M.I.T., Pigford and his then-student Scriven at Delaware, Danckwerts in the U.K., and Levich in the U.S.S.R. Quinn and his students distinguished themselves by fashioning a number of elegant experimental systems (e.g., the moving-band absorber) capable of producing the very “young” or fresh interfaces at which it was possible to probe interfacial mass transfer resistances associated with gas-liquid and liquid- liquid transport. These endeavors would ultimately expand to include exploration of the role of insoluble stagnant films at interfaces and of transport-induced convective instabilities arising on either side of them.

Transport fundamentals in finely porous membranes: Quinn’s investigations of transport in nano- and microporous membranes (both synthetic and biological) would be grounded in experiments conducted with track-etched porous mica membranes fabricated by a dozen of his students at both Illinois and Penn. Using this experimental platform to validate their analysis, Quinn and his student John L. Anderson developed and solved the fundamental hydrodynamic equations governing hindered diffusion of species (incorporating the effects of both steric exclusion and Brownian motion) in nanometer- and sub-micron pores in a way that avoided the restrictive assumptions necessary in prior (and simpler) treatments of this problem. This body of work would later expand to include analysis of electrodynamic/electrokinetic effects of various microsolutes, macromolecules, and colloids as they diffused across and/or adsorbed to the walls of neutral and electrically charged membrane pores.

Diffusion in reactive media and biological systems: Quinn’s fascination with biological membrane structure and function led naturally and directly to attempts to understand and utilize biomembrane phenomena in synthetic membrane constructs – e.g., in facilitated transport membranes with potential for the industrial-scale separations of reactive gases like CO_{2}. In experiments done in collaboration with investigators at Penn’s school of medicine, synthetic membranes were used to understand gas transport in and across the skin and in enzyme membrane reactors capable of resolving racemic mixtures of chiral pharmaceuticals into their pure-isomer components. In 1984 one of Quinn’s former students, Stephen Matson, co-founded Sepracor Inc. to commercialize this research and apply the technology to the manufacture of the calcium channel blocker diltiazem. Quinn would serve the company as a founding member of its Scientific Advisory Board. After going public in 1991, Sepracor brought a number of chiral and active-metabolite drugs to market, including Allegra, Xopenex, and Lunesta. In 2009 Dainippon Sumitomo Pharma purchased Sepracor, which currently operates as Sunovion, Inc.

Biomembrane-mediated cell adhesion and transport: Quinn later returned to basic research that focused on a related set of problems involving the surface adhesion and/or transport of cells – both bacterial and mammalian (e.g., endothelial) – in processes mediated by the interaction of the cell membrane with its environment. For example, Quinn and his students explored such phenomena as diffusiophoresis, bacterial chemotaxis and surface motility, and still other processes dependent on the kinetics and/or strength of interaction between cells and active ligands, whether present on the surface of cell membranes or on the ligand-activated surfaces of engineered devices. This work is significant not only for its insights into under-lying biological phenomena but also for its implications for designing devices to manipulate, separate, or assay various cell types.

== Honor and awards ==
- Allan P. Colburn Award, American Institute of Chemical Engineers (1966)
- Alpha Chi Sigma Award, American Institute of Chemical Engineers (1978)
- National Academy of Engineering (1978)
- American Academy of Arts and Sciences (1992)

In 2004, Quinn's students endowed an annual lectureship -- "The John A. Quinn Lecture in Chemical Engineering"—to be presented annually at the University of Pennsylvania by a distinguished chemical engineering colleague.
