= Anthony Quinn (judge) =

American judge

Anthony B. Quinn (died October 24, 2013) was a Utah Third Judicial District court judge for Salt Lake County, Utah. He was appointed to this position in September 1996 by Gov. Michael O. Leavitt.

== Early life and education ==
Quinn was born in Virginia and lived for some time in Greenwich, Connecticut. Sometime while in high school, his father retired, moving the family back to his family's roots, settling in Bountiful, Utah. He received his bachelor's degree in history from Brigham Young University in 1976 and served as Note and Comment editor of the Law Review. He then graduated from J. Reuben Clark Law School at BYU in 1980, where he graduated in the top 5% of his class.

== Legal career ==
After graduating from law school at BYU, Quinn went to work as a law clerk for Utah federal district court judge David K. Winder. He worked there for a year before joining the Salt Lake City, Utah law firm of Ray, Quinney and Nebeker. He worked there from January 1982 to January 1992. He then joined law firm of Wood, Quinn and Crapo. He worked there for five years before being appointed as a judge for Utah's Third Judicial District. As well as practicing law and being a professor, Quinn has served on the Supreme Court Advisory Committee on the Rules of Civil Procedure, the Executive Committee of the Salt Lake Area Safe at Home Coalition.

== Judicial career ==
In September 1997, Quinn was appointed by the Governor Michael O. Leavitt to the position of judge on Utah's Third Judicial District. He served for 18 years.

== Notable cases/rulings ==
Judge Quinn presided over a lawsuit filed against the Governor of the State of Utah and others in 2010 by a member of the Utah State Board of Education who was ousted from the Board in the nomination and selection process. Judge Quinn rejected the constitutional challenge to the selection process, but did rule the process was conducted in violation of the Utah Open and Public Meetings Act. However, Judge Quinn ruled that the violations could not be rectified by voiding the actions taken against the plaintiff.

Judge Quinn presided over a lawsuit in which a family sued the Utah Department of Transportation (UDOT) for wrongful death for failing to maintain a barrier on Interstate 15. The jury decided in favor of UDOT. In 2012, the Utah Supreme Court reversed the decision and ordered a new trial. The Supreme Court found that Judge Quinn had erred in failing to give a jury instruction that favored the family.

== Personal life ==
Quinn married a wife and they had three children.

When asked what he likes most about his job, Judge Quinn explained that he "enjoys engaging in discussion with good lawyers," and he "loves the variety of cases."

== Death ==
On October 24, 2013, while riding his bicycle up Millcreek Canyon in Salt Lake Valley, Utah, Quinn was hit head on by an elderly driver who became distracted behind the wheel, and crossed into oncoming traffic. Quinn was transported to an area hospital in critical condition where he later died from his injuries. 79-year-old David E. Bertelson, of Albuquerque, was allowed to plead guilty, and was sentenced to "six months' probation sentence [and] to pay a $670 fine." There was discussion in criminal justice circles to modify Utah's law to prevent such a plea bargain to a B misdemeanor, and the lenient sentence, in favor of a felony.
