= Rhoda Howard-Hassmann =

Canadian social scientist

- Born: Rhoda Howard; Scotland
- Education: McGill University
- Occupation: social scientist
- Awards: Order of Canada (2023); Fellow of the Royal Society of Canada (1993); Sir John William Dawson Medal for Interdisciplinary Research (2013); Outstanding Book in Human Rights Award (2004)

Rhoda E. Howard-Hassmann CM OOnt FRSC is a Canadian social scientist who specializes in international human rights.

== Biography ==
Howard-Hassmann was born Rhoda Howard in Scotland. Her mother (Mary Byrne) was Scottish, her father (Helmut Hassmann, later Michael Howard) was a refugee from Nazi Germany. She was brought to Canada at a young age and attended public schools in Quebec and southern Ontario. She is married and the mother of one son, born in 1981. In 1999 she changed her legal name from Rhoda E. Howard to Rhoda E. Hassmann, but she publishes her academic work as Rhoda E. Howard-Hassmann. She has lived in Hamilton, Ontario since 1976.

== Education ==
Howard-Hassmann attended four high schools: T.A. Blakelock (Oakville, Ontario); Bell High School (Ottawa, Ontario): Ripley District High School (Ripley, Ontario); and Stanford Collegiate and Vocational Institute (Niagara Falls, Ontario). She attended McGill University from 1965 to 1976, earning a BA in Political Science (1969), an MA in sociology (1972), and a PhD in sociology (1976). Her master's supervisor was Donald Von Eschen and her doctoral supervisor was Immanuel Wallerstein.

== Career ==
Howard-Hassmann taught in the Department of Sociology at the University of Calgary for one year (1975–76), after which she spent 27 years (1976–2003) as a professor in the Department of Sociology, McMaster University. She originated and directed McMaster's now-defunct undergraduate minor Theme School on International Justice and Human Rights (1993–99), one of the world's first undergraduate non-law programs in human rights.

From 2003 to 2016, Dr. Howard-Hassmann held a Canada Research Chair in International Human Rights at Wilfrid Laurier University in Waterloo, Ontario. There she held a joint appointment in the Department of Global Studies and the Balsillie School of International Affairs until 2014, when her appointment changed to the School of International Policy and Governance (part of the Balsillie School) and the Department of Political Science. She retired in 2017.

Howard-Hassmann has held several visiting research and teaching appointments. She conducted doctoral research in Ghana in 1974 and 1977 for her book, Colonialism and Underdevelopment in Ghana (1978). She was a visiting scholar at the Institute for Social and Economic Research, Rhodes University, South Africa in August 1992, and she was visiting scholar at the Netherlands Institute of Human Rights, University of Utrecht, from July through December 2000. She was Marsha Lilien Gladstein Distinguished Visiting professor of Human Rights at the University of Connecticut (2001); James Farmer Visiting professor of Human Rights at the University of Mary Washington, Fredericksburg, Virginia (2003); and Torgny Segerstedt Visiting professor of Human Rights, University of Goteborg, Sweden (2005).

== Honours ==
Howard-Hassmann has been a Fellow of the Royal Society of Canada since 1993. In 2014 she was named Distinguished Scholar of Human Rights by the Human Rights Section of the International Studies Association. In 2013 she received the Sir John William Dawson Medal for Interdisciplinary Research from the Royal Society of Canada. In 2006 she was named the first Distinguished Scholar of Human Rights by the Human Rights Section of the American Political Science Association.

In 2010, as a Senior Editor of the Encyclopedia of Human Rights, Howard-Hassmann shared in the honour of receiving the Dartmouth Medal from the Reference and User Services Association. In 2007 her co-edited (with Claude E. Welch Jr.) work Economic Rights in Canada and the United States was named a Notable Contribution to Human Rights by the United States Network of Human Rights, a coalition of 200 human rights non-governmental organizations. In 2004 Howard-Hassmann received the Outstanding Book in Human Rights Award from the Human Rights Section of the American Political Science Association for her book Compassionate Canadians: Civil Leaders Discuss Human Rights. In 1989 her book Human Rights in Commonwealth Africa received an Honourable Mention for the Joel Gregory Book Prize from the Canadian Association of African Studies.

Howard-Hassmann also won the 1993 Teaching Award in the Arts and Sciences Faculty of McMaster University.

She was appointed to the Order of Canada in June 2023 and the Order of Ontario in November 2023.

== Publications ==
Howard-Hassmann is the author and editor of several books and many articles on international human rights.

Her books include:

- Rhoda Howard-Hassmann (2018). In Defense of Universal Human Rights. Medford, MA: Polity Press. ISBN 9781509513536.
- Rhoda Howard-Hassmann (2016). State Food Crimes. Cambridge, UK: Cambridge University Press. ISBN 9781316459812.
- Rhoda Howard-Hassmann (2010). Can Globalization Promote Human Rights?. University Park, PA: Penn State University Press. ISBN 978-0271037394.
- Rhoda Howard-Hassmann; Anthony P. Lombardo (2008). Reparations to Africa. Philadelphia: University of Pennsylvania Press. ISBN 978-0812241013.
- Rhoda Howard-Hassmann (2003). Compassionate Canadians: Civic Leaders Discuss Human Rights. Toronto: University of Toronto Press. ISBN 0802036643.
- Rhoda Howard (1995). Human Rights and the Search for Community. Boulder, CO: Westview Press. ISBN 081332579X.
- Rhoda Howard (1986). Human Rights in Commonwealth Africa. Lanham, MD: Rowman & Littlefield Publishers. ISBN 0847674339.
- Rhoda Howard (1978). Colonialism and Underdevelopment in Ghana. Boulder, CO: Holmes & Meier Pub. ISBN 0841903875.

She is also co-editor of:

- The Human Right to Citizenship: A Slippery Concept. Philadelphia, PA: University of Pennsylvania Press. 2015. ISBN 978-0812247176.
- The Age of Apology: Facing Up to the Past. Philadelphia, PA: University of Pennsylvania Press. 2008. ISBN 978-0812240337.
- Economic Rights in Canada and the United States. Philadelphia, PA: University of Pennsylvania Press. 2006. ISBN 9780812220933.
- International Handbook of Human Rights. Westport, CT: Greenwood Press. 1987. ISBN 0313247889.

Howard-Hassmann's interests over the years have included African studies, human rights in Canada, Canadian foreign and refugee policy, development and globalization studies, comparative genocide studies, women's studies, gay and lesbian studies, reparative justice and official apologies, human security, and theoretical and methodological issues in human rights.

== Website, blog and poetry ==
From 2005 to 2015, Howard-Hassmann maintained a now-defunct website on political apologies, which contains descriptive documents on various apologies by governments, religious organizations, corporations and others, as well as links to the actual apologies themselves or to press reports about them.

Since 2012 she has maintained the blog Rights & Rightlessness: Rhoda Hassmann on Human Rights.

First as Rhoda Howard and then after 1999 as Rhoda Hassmann, she has published poetry, mostly in local journals such as The Tower Poetry Society and The Banister Poetry Anthology. She also has several poems in Canadian anthologies, including Tamaracks.

== Journal editing ==
From 1987 to 1992 Howard-Hassmann was co-editor and editor (in both English and French) of the Canadian Journal of African Studies. As of 2020, she was a member of the editorial boards of Human Rights Quarterly, Journal of Human Rights, and the Netherlands Quarterly of Human Rights.

== Consulting and volunteering ==
Howard-Hassmann has conducted human rights training sessions for the Canadian Human Rights Foundation and the Raoul Wallenberg Institute in Sweden. She also posted scenarios on cultural relativism and human rights on her now-defunct Wilfrid Laurier University professor website for other scholars to use in teaching. In the early 1990s she wrote two reports on human rights for Canada's then–Department of External Affairs. She also acted as a consultant for the establishment of undergraduate programs in human rights at the University of Connecticut, Emory University, University of Dayton and the University of Nebraska–Lincoln. In 1990 she took part in an American delegation to the Institute of State and Law, Moscow. In 2007 she was a member of a delegation on human rights from the now-defunct NGO, Rights and Democracy (Montreal) to the Communist Party School in Beijing.

Howard-Hassmann was a member of the Anti-Discrimination Committee of the City of Hamilton, 1991–1996. In 1999-2000 she taught citizenship classes for immigrants in Hamilton.
