= Alexander Quinn =

Alexander Quinn may refer to:

- Alexander M. Quinn (1866–1906), U.S. Army soldier and Medal of Honor recipient
- Alexander James Quinn (1932–2013), bishop of the Catholic Church in the United States
- Alex Quinn, racing driver

== See also ==
- Alexandra Quinn, pornographic actress
