= Tony Quinn =

Tony Quinn may refer to:

- Tony Quinn (businessman), Irish entrepreneur and founder of the Educo Seminar
- Tony Quinn (footballer), English footballer
