= Attorney General Quinn =

Attorney General Quinn may refer to:

- John Quinn (advocate) (born 1954), Attorney General of the Isle of Man
- Robert H. Quinn (1928–2014), Attorney General of Massachusetts

== See also ==
- General Quinn (disambiguation)
