= Thomas C. Quinn =

American physician

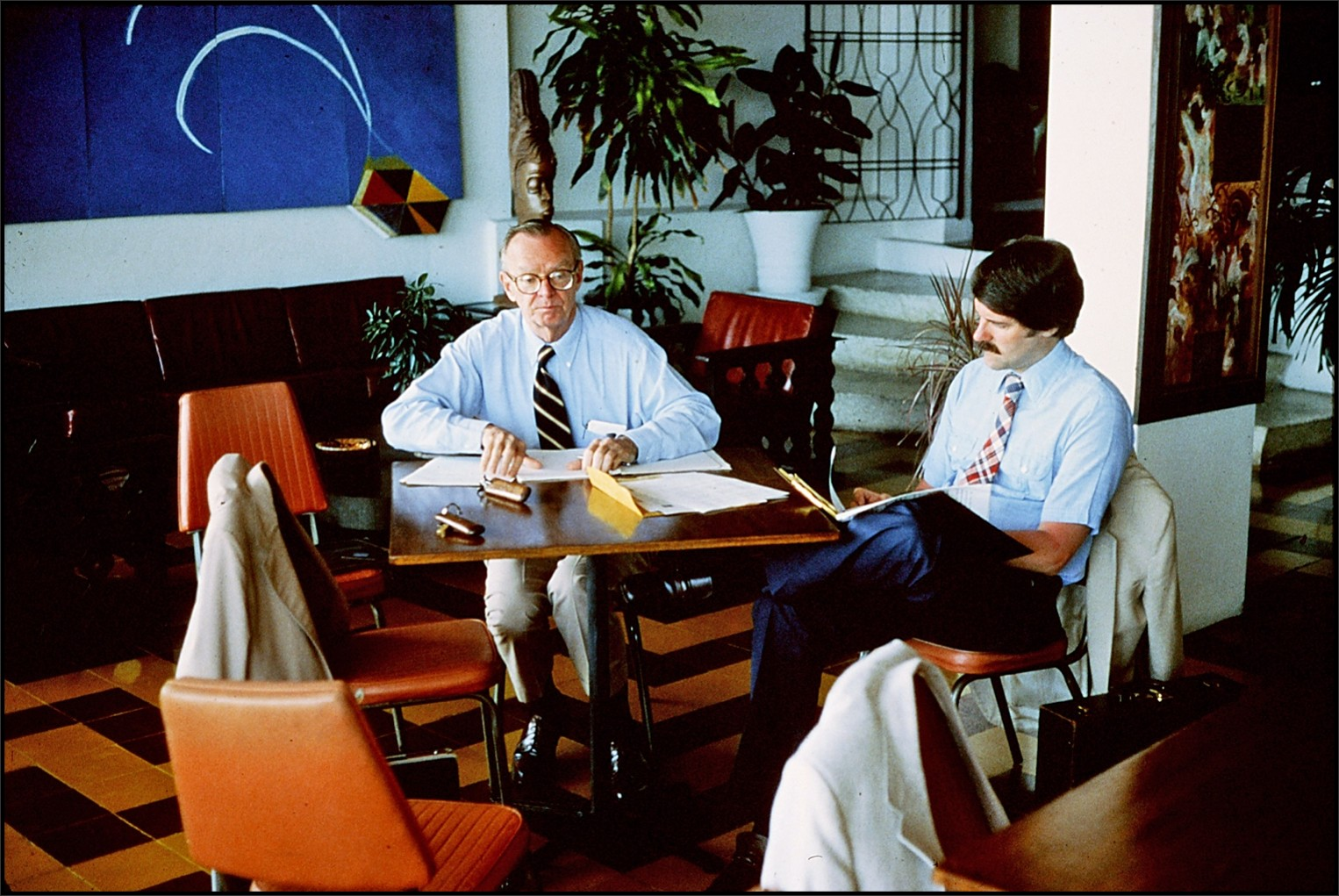
Dr. Richard Krause (left) and Dr. Thomas C. Quinn (right) in Port-au-Prince, Haiti in the 1980s.

Thomas C. Quinn is an American physician and infectious disease researcher specializing in the study of HIV/AIDS. He is a professor of medicine and pathology at the Johns Hopkins School of Medicine and director of the Johns Hopkins Center for Global Health. He is also a professor of international health, epidemiology, and molecular microbiology and immunology at the Johns Hopkins School of Public Health and a professor of nursing the Johns Hopkins School of Nursing. In addition, he serves as Associate Director for International Research at the National Institute of Allergy and Infectious Diseases.

== Education and career ==
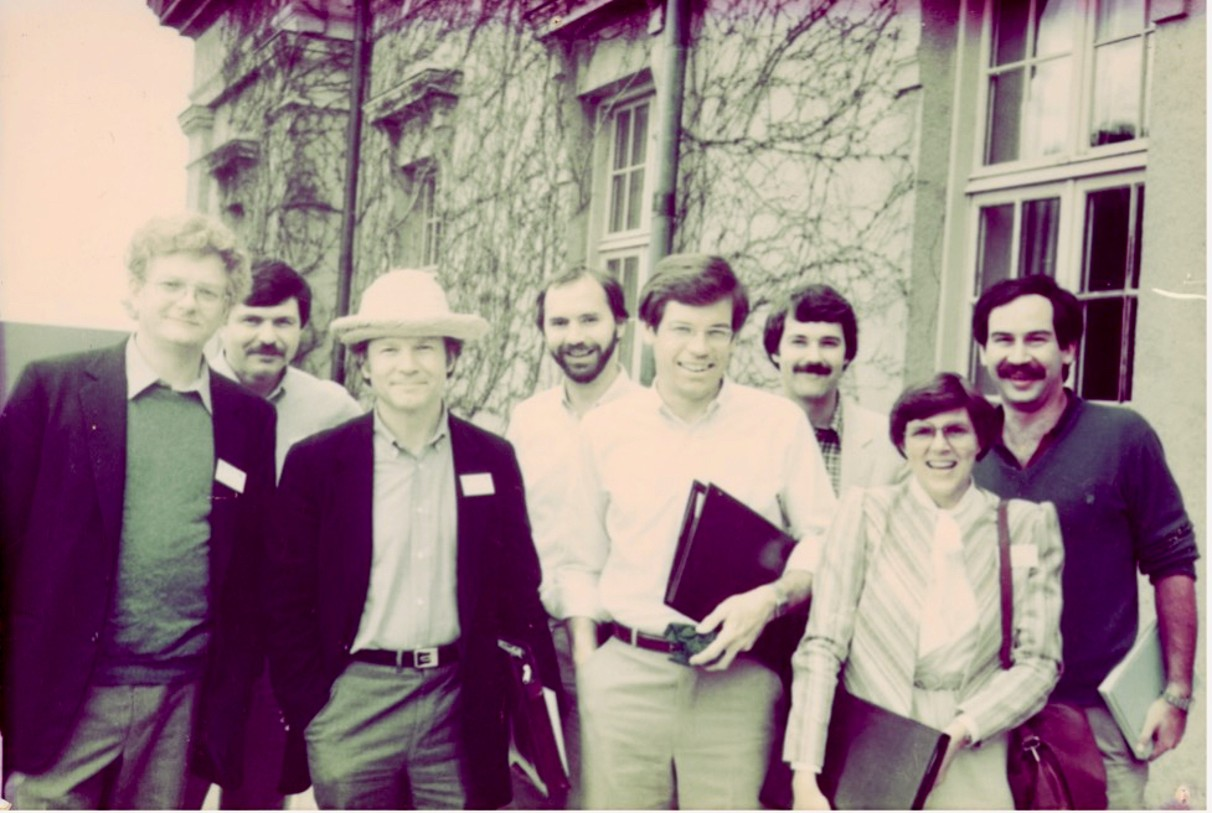
University of Washington Fellowship. From left to right: Per Anders Mardh, David Eschenbach, King Holmes, Peter Piot, Walter Stamm, Tom Quinn, Dorothy Patten, Mike Lovett

Quinn was educated at the University of Notre Dame, receiving his bachelor's and master's degrees from there in 1969 and 1970, respectively. In 1974, he received his M.D. from the Northwestern University Feinberg School of Medicine, and completed his fellowship in infectious disease at the University of Washington. He has been board-certified by the American Board of Internal Medicine in internal medicine since 1977 and in infectious disease since 1982. In 2004, he was elected to the Institute of Medicine of the National Academy of Sciences, and in 2006, he was named the founding director of the Johns Hopkins University Center for Global Health. He is also a fellow of the American Association for the Advancement of Science and the Infectious Diseases Society of America.
