= Tom Quinn (footballer, born 1947) =

Australian rules footballer

Personal information
- Full name: Tom Quinn
- Born: 31 October 1947 (age 79)
- Original team: Bentleigh
- Height: 191 cm (6 ft 3 in)
- Weight: 85.5 kg (188 lb)
- Position: Ruck

Playing career^{1}
Years	Club	Games (Goals)
1967	Melbourne	5 (0)
- ^{1} Playing statistics correct to the end of 1967.

Tom Quinn (born 31 October 1947) is a former Australian rules footballer who played with Melbourne in the Victorian Football League (VFL).
