= Martin Quinn =

Martin Quinn may refer to:

- Martin Quinn (actor) (born 1994), Scottish actor
- Martin Quinn (mayor) (born 1949), Irish Fianna Fáil politician
- Martin Quinn (senator), Irish senator
- Martin Quinn (Gaelic footballer) (1938–2021), Irish Gaelic footballer
- Martin Quinn (cyclist) (born c.1964), Northern Irish cyclist
- Martin–Quinn score, used to assess the ideological leanings of U.S. Supreme Court justices over time

== See also ==
- Quinn Martin (1922–1987), American television producer
