= Patricia Quinn (disambiguation) =

Patricia Quinn (born 1944) is a British actress.

Patricia Quinn may also refer to:

- Patricia Quinn (atmospheric chemist), American atmospheric chemist
- Pat Quinn (American actress) (born 1937), American actress

== See also ==
- Pat Quinn (disambiguation)
- Patrick Quinn (disambiguation)
