= James H. Quinn =

American judge (1857–1930)

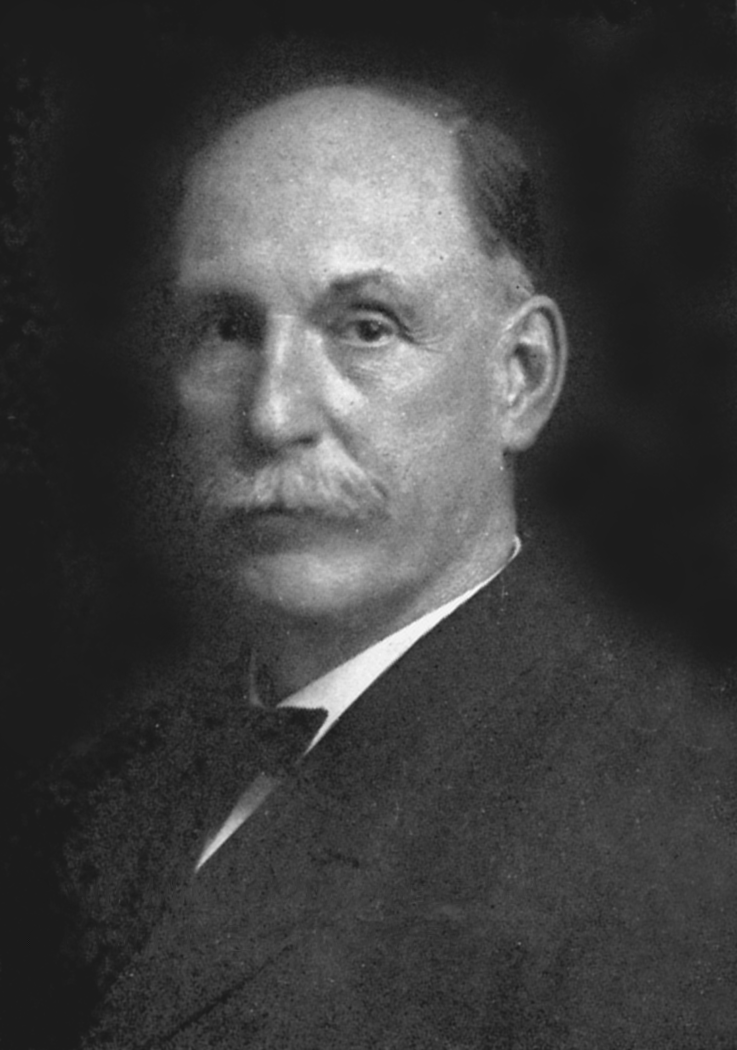
James H. Quinn

James H. Quinn (June 23, 1857 – February 15, 1930) was an American jurist.

Born in Kilbourn City, Wisconsin, Quinn moved with his parents to a farm in Blue Earth County, Minnesota in 1863. He graduated from an academy in Poynette, Wisconsin in 1880. Quinn then studied the law, in Mapleton, Minnesota, and was admitted to the Minnesota bar in 1885 in Mankato, Minnesota. He was elected county attorney for Faribault County, Minnesota in 1888. From 1897 until 1916, Quinn served as Minnesota District Court judge. Quinn was on the board of directors of the First National Bank of Wells, in Wells, Minnesota. Quinn served on the Minnesota Supreme Court from 1917 until his retirement in 1928. Quinn died of heart problems at his home in Saint Paul, Minnesota.
