= Los Molinos Observatory =

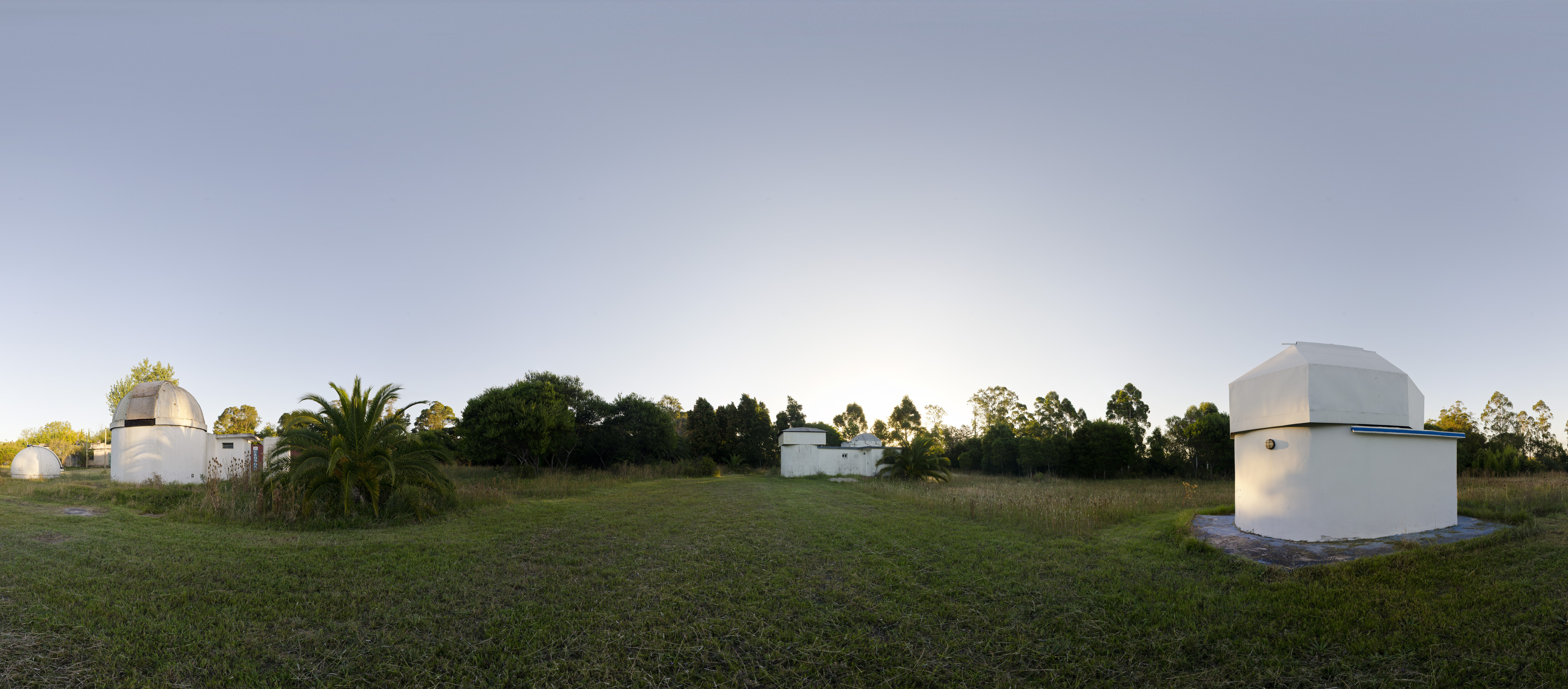
- Telescopes at Los Molinos Observatory
- Alternative names: Observatorio Astronómico Los Molinos
- Organization: University of the Republic
- Observatory code: 844
- Location: Montevideo, Montevideo Department, Uruguay
- Coordinates: 34°45′19″S 56°11′25″W
- Altitude: 28 m (92 ft)
- Established: 1994
- Website: www.oalm.gub.uy/en/index.html
- Location of Los Molinos Observatory
- Related media on Commons

Los Molinos Observatory (Spanish: Observatorio Astronómico Los Molinos, OALM; obs. code: 844) is an astronomical observatory owned by the Ministerio de Educación y Cultura de Uruguay and operated in collaboration with the University of the Republic's Astronomy Department. It is located near the city of Las Piedras, on the outskirts of Montevideo, Uruguay.

The observatory is actively involved in follow-up observations of small bodies in the Solar System such as asteroids and comets. It has the observatory code 844.

The main-belt asteroid 10476 Los Molinos, discovered by American astronomer Schelte Bus at the Siding Spring Observatory in 1981, was named after this observatory. The official naming citation was published on 13 April 2017 by the Minor Planet Center (M.P.C. 103975).

== Discoveries ==
- Main belt asteroid, 68853 Vaimaca, on 19 April 2002
- Main belt asteroid, 73342 Guyunusa, on 4 May 2002
- Variable star, VSX J034330.8-442815, on 18 November 2011
- Variable star, VSX J074722.4+220414, on 19 November 2011
