= Tom Quinn (astrophysicist) =

American astrophysicist

- Citizenship: United States of America
- Education: Lehigh University Princeton University
- Scientific career
- Fields: Astronomy, Astrophysics, Computational Astrophysics
- Workplaces: University of Washington
- Website: http://www-hpcc.astro.washington.edu/faculty/trq/

Tom Quinn is a professor in the Department of Astronomy at the University of Washington (UW) in Seattle. He is the leader of the N-Body Shop, a faculty member of the astrobiology program at UW, and an affiliate member at the eScience Institute. He assisted in generating the cosmological simulation code called ChaNGA.

== Early life and education ==
Quinn received his B.S. degree in engineering physics from Lehigh University, and went on to receive his Ph.D. in Astrophysics in 1986 from Princeton University. He started working at the University of Washington in 1993.

== Work ==
Quinn is the leader of the N-Body Shop, where their work is centered on n-body simulations. His research within that group is focused on simulating the structures of the universe and analyzing the structure formation that takes place. He is also interested in planet formation, solar and galactic dynamics. He is a faculty member of the astrobiology program at UW, where his research interests include exoplanet detection and planetary formation and evolution. Additionally, Quinn is an affiliate of the eScience Institute at UW.

Quinn and others at the University of Illinois, generated a computer code called CHArm++ N-body GrAvity, or ChaNGA, which allows scientists to simulate the universe and study cosmology. ChaNGA was designed to be scalable and uses the Smoothed-Particle Hydrodynamics (SPH) technique.
