= Paddy Quinn (Irish republican) =

Irish republican

Patrick Quinn (born 1952) was a volunteer with the 1st Battalion, South Armagh Brigade of the Provisional Irish Republican Army (IRA) who took part in the 1981 Irish hunger strike.

== Paramilitary activity ==
On 2 March 1977, Quinn and Raymond McCreesh were convicted and sentenced to fourteen years in prison for attempted murder, possession of a rifle and ammunition and a further five years for IRA membership. He was interned at HMP Maze, a high-security prison known for housing a significant concentration of IRA and other Irish nationalist prisoners. Quinn would later go on to describe some of the conditions which were experienced by political detainees during the late 1970s, where the only time prisoners would leave their cells would be to attend Sunday Mass. Quinn was at 'the Maze' during the Dirty Protest, designed to protest the 'special category status' faced by paramilitaries at that time.

On the 1st of March, 1981, Bobby Sands would announce a new protest to the conditions in HMP Maze, which came in the form of hunger strikes. Inspired, Quinn joined the hunger strike on 15 June 1981. Fellow members of the hunger strike recounted how his psychological state deteriorated over time, described as "terrible hallucinations". When he was close to death after 47 days (having slipped into a coma because of reported kidney issues) his mother signed a medical waiver which allowed him to be admitted to a hospital and, ultimately, doctors were able to save his life. He was the first hunger striker whose family intervened, and the second whose hunger strike ended overall. The behaviour of Quinn's mother provided a legal and moral precedent for the families of other strikers. The parents of Pat McGeown would also prevent their son's death through medical intervention once in a coma, ultimately spelling the end of 1981 Hunger Strikes. In recent years, there has been some speculation around the circumstances in which the waivers were signed. When addressing Grand Rapids Community College, fellow IRA activist Desmond Murphy confirmed that it was the Irish Catholic Church placing pressure on the mother, going on to describe the end of Quinn's hunger strike as 'involuntary'.

== Later years ==
Paddy Quinn and his mother would both go on to describe what happened in interviews for a BBC documentary on the Hunger Strikes in 1993. In 2006, a retrospective on the 1981 Hunger Strikes by the Guardian indicated that Quinn considered the Hunger Strikes to be a success, in large part because it introduced Sinn Féin to the prospects of electoral politics. He also confirmed the long-term effects of his strike – permanent damage to his eyesight and the need for a kidney transplant left him unemployed, living in a farmhouse in County Down with his family.
