= Billy Quinn (footballer) =

Australian rules footballer

Personal information
- Full name: William Andrew Quinn
- Born: 27 July 1890; Yarra Glen, Victoria
- Died: 1 November 1969 (aged 79); Ormond, Victoria
- Original team: Melbourne City

Playing career^{1}
Years	Club	Games (Goals)
1914	Melbourne	11 (2)
- ^{1} Playing statistics correct to the end of 1914.

William Andrew Quinn (27 July 1890 – 1 November 1969) was an Australian rules footballer who played with Melbourne in the Victorian Football League (VFL).
