= C. Patrick Quinn =

American politician

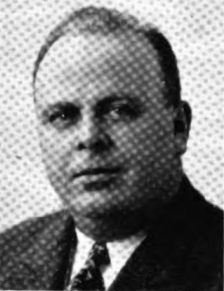

Member of the Michigan House of Representatives from the Wayne County 1st district
- In office January 1, 1945 – 1946

Personal details
- Born: April 19, 1900 County Donegal, Ireland
- Died: May 21, 1969 (aged 69) Sarasota, Florida, US
- Party: Democratic
- Spouse: Lilly

Cornelius Patrick Quinn (April 19, 1900 – May 21, 1969) was a Michigan politician.

Quinn was born to parents James and Rose Quinn on April 19, 1900 in Ireland, and immigrated to the United States in 1926. Quinn married Lilly Howley in 1930. On November 7, 1944, Quinn was elected as a member of the Michigan House of Representatives from the Wayne County 1st district. Quinn was sworn in on January 3, 1945. He served in this position until 1946, when he unsuccessfully ran for re-election.
