= Mary Ellen Quinn =

American librarian (born 1949)

Mary Ellen Quinn (born 1949) is an American librarian. From 1997 until retirement in 2011 she edited and then managed the Reference Book Bulletin section of Booklist for the American Library Association. She also wrote the column 'Librarian's Library' for American Libraries.

== Works ==
- 'Words and Languages' in Jack O'Gorman, ed., Reference Sources for Small and Medium-sized Libraries, 8th ed. 2014, pp. 83–98
- A Historical Dictionary of Librarianship, 2014.
