= National Route 22 (Vietnam) =

Road in Vietnam

National Route 22
- Quốc lộ 22
- Lê Quang Đạo (Hóc Môn District section); Phan Văn Khải (Củ Chi District section); National Route 22A (Gò Dầu – Mộc Bài Border Gate)
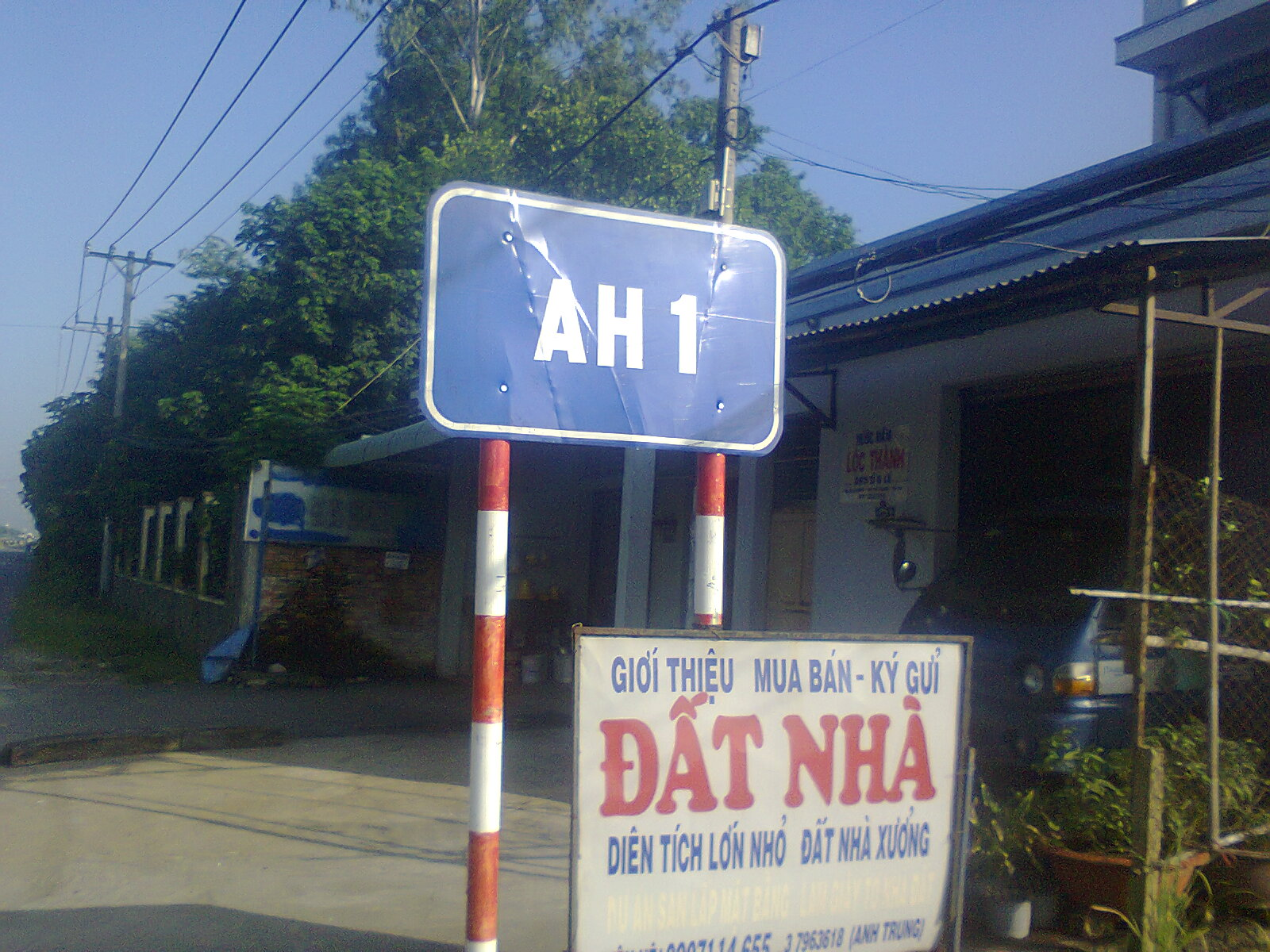
- Sign of AH1 on the route, marking this route is a part of the highway

Route information
- Part of AH1
- Length: 59 km (37 mi)

Major junctions
- South-East end: AH1 An Sương Junction, District 12, Ho Chi Minh City
- TL 8 in Củ Chi township junction, Củ Chi, Hồ Chí Minh city; TL 7 in Phước Thạnh, Củ Chi, Hồ Chí Minh city; at Gia Bình, Trảng Bàng, Tây Ninh; at Gò Dầu Y-junction roundabout in Gò Dầu, Tây Ninh
- North-West end: N1 at Mộc Bài International Border Gate, Cambodian border, Bến Cầu District, Tây Ninh

Location
- Country: Vietnam
- Provinces: Tây Ninh Province
- Districts: Ho Chi Minh City: District 12, Hóc Môn, Củ Chi; Tây Ninh: Gò Dầu, Bến Cầu
- Municipalities: Ho Chi Minh City
- Towns: Trảng Bàng, Tây Ninh

Highway system
- Transport in Vietnam
← QL 21B	→ QL 22B

National Route 22 (Vietnamese: Quốc lộ 22) is a highway in southern Vietnam stretching from the northwestern outskirts of Ho Chi Minh City, the commercial centre of the country, towards the Cambodian border to the northwest. It is the main route for trade and traffic between Cambodia and southern Vietnam. Under French administration and South Vietnam, this highway was designated National Road 1.

== Overall ==
=== Main route ===
The highway starts on the northwestern outskirts of Ho Chi Minh City, between District 12 and Hóc Môn. The highway passes through the town of Củ Chi before reaching Trảng Bàng and Gò Dầu near the Cambodian border. From Gò Dầu intersection, the route divided into 2 branches as Route 22A and 22B, the main route is Route 22A, diverges into the border town of Mộc Bài before crossing the border and becoming National Highway 1 in Cambodia at Bavet in Svay Rieng Province on the Cambodian border where it leads to Phnom Penh in the northwest.

=== National Route 22B ===
National Route 22B starts at Gò Dầu intersection with Route 22A, diverges into the Town of Hòa Thành, the heartland of the Cao Đài religion before reaching the provincial capital of Tây Ninh. The highway continues north, reaching the Xa Mat border crossing at the town of Trai Bi, becoming National Route 72 at Trapeang Phlong border crossing in Cambodia.

== Metro Line 2 ==
Ho Chi Minh City Metro Line 2 has a stretch of Ohase 2 and 3 runs along the route in District 12, Hóc Môn and Củ Chi, from the An Sương Terminus to Provincial Road 7 (adjacent to Trảng Bàng Town, Tây Ninh Province). Furthermore, the line will extend along the rest of the route in Tây Ninh.
