= Gò Dầu =

- Ward
- National Route 22, the Trans-Asia Road, through Gò Dầu ward
- Interactive map of Gò Dầu
- Coordinates: 11.087496504603136°N 106.26377818492092°E
- Country: Vietnam
- Province: Tây Ninh
- Region: Southeast
- Seat: Đường Nguyễn Hữu Thọ, Khu phố Rạch Sơn

Area
  - Total: 43.09 km^{2} (16.64 sq mi)

Population (31 December 2024)
  - Total: 66,340
  - Density: 1,539/km^{2} (3,990/sq mi)
- Website: godau.tayninh.gov.vn

Gò Dầu is a ward in Tây Ninh province, Vietnam. The ward inherited its name from the former Gò Dầu district.

On 16 June 2025, the Standing Committee of the National Assembly of Vietnam adopted Resolution No. 1682/NQ-UBTVQH15 on the reorganization of commune-level administrative units in Tây Ninh province in 2025. Under the resolution, the entire area and population of Gia Bình ward in Trảng Bàng town, Gò Dầu township and Thanh Phước commune in the former Gò Dầu district were consolidated to form a new ward named Gò Dầu.
