= Cambodia–Vietnam border =

International border

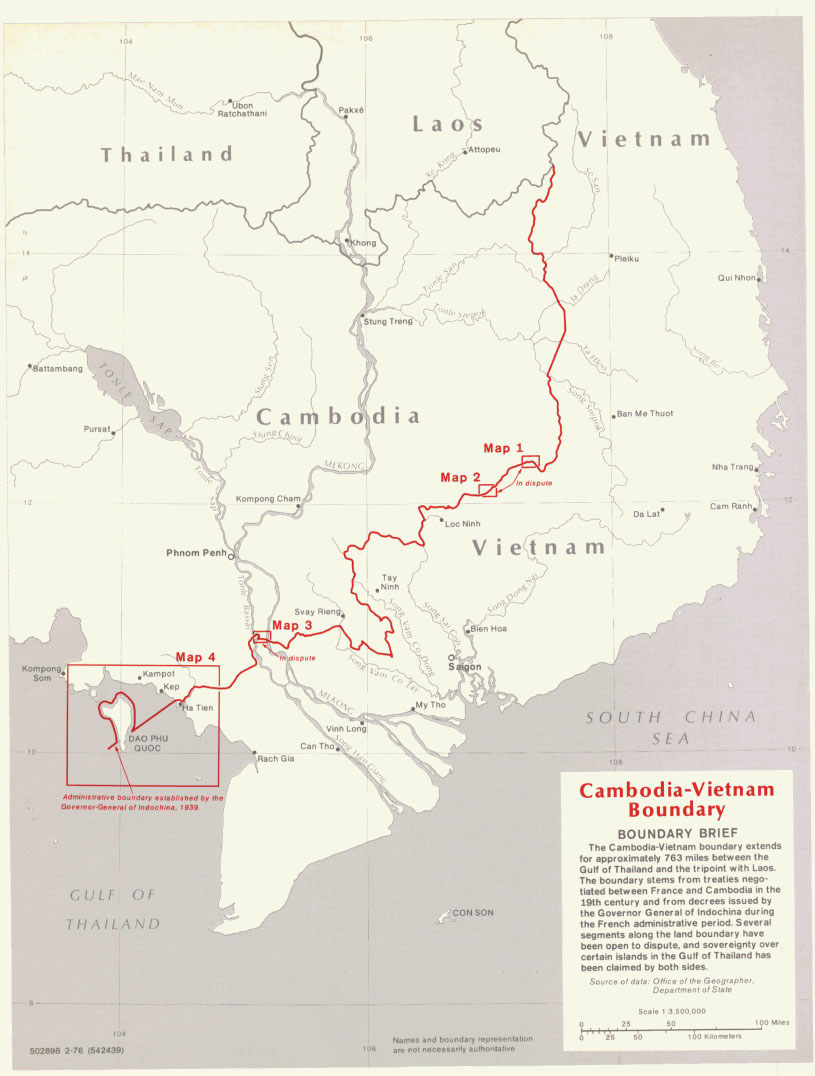
Map of the Cambodia–Vietnam border

The Cambodia–Vietnam border is the international border between the territory of Cambodia and Vietnam. The border is 1,158 km (720 mi) in length and runs from the tripoint with Laos in the north to Gulf of Thailand in the south.

== Description ==
The border starts in the north at the tripoint with Laos and then proceeds overland to the south, occasionally utilising rivers such as the Tonlé San. It then turns in a broad arc to the south-west, except for the Cambodian protrusion known as the Parrot's Beak, running mostly overland but also at times using rivers such as the Vàm Cỏ Đông and the Saigon. After cutting across the Mekong Delta it continues southwestwards, terminating at the Gulf of Thailand just west of Hà Tiên. The maritime boundary forms a loop, so Phú Quốc island belongs to Vietnam despite it being closer to the Cambodia shore.

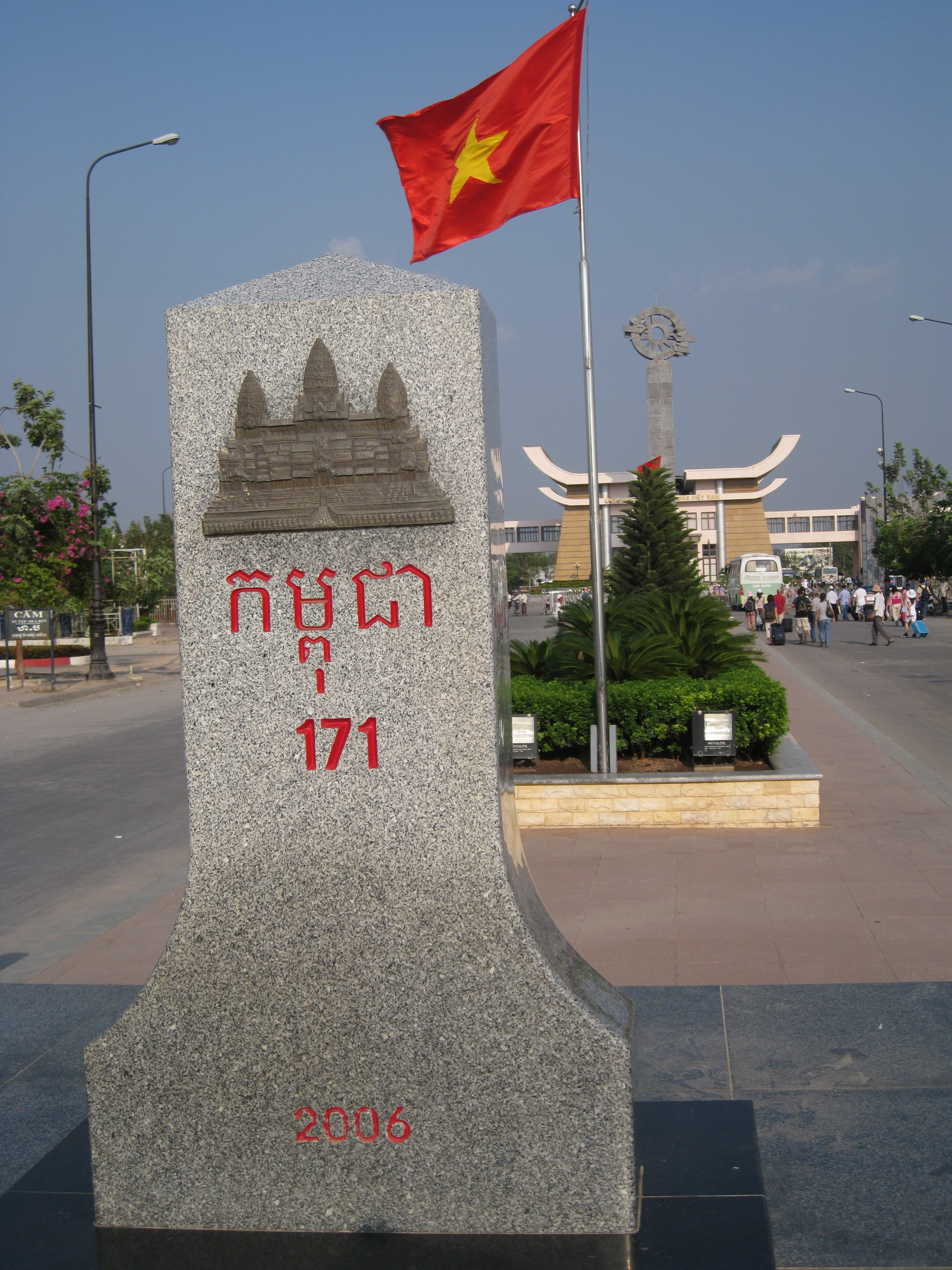
The boundary marker, looking from the Cambodian side towards Vietnam

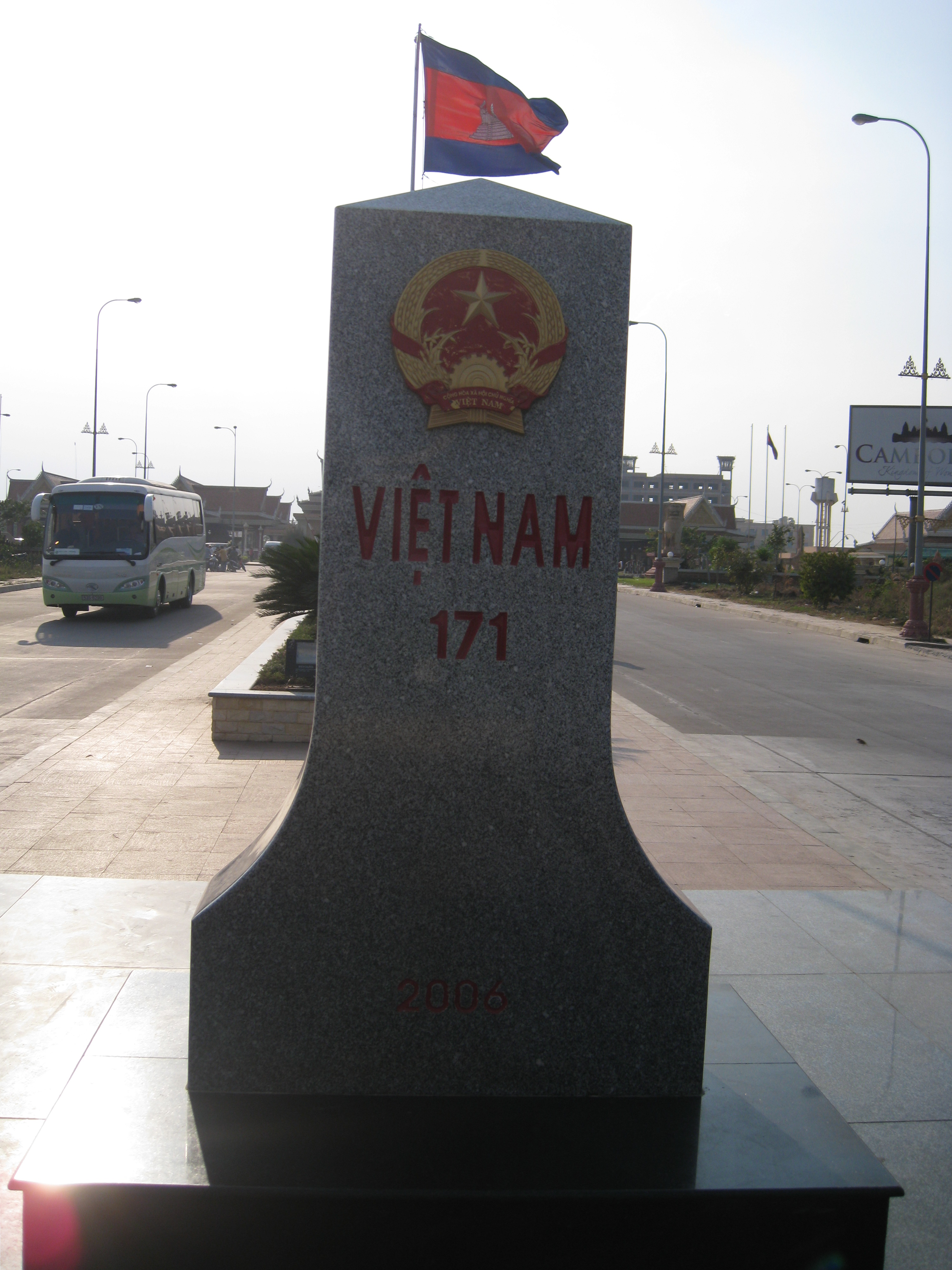
The boundary marker, looking from the Vietnamese side towards Cambodia

== History ==
Vietnamese people gradually migrated from northern Vietnam southwards during the 10th–18th centuries, eventually bringing them into contact with the Khmer kingdom. Relations were often tense, with Vietnam frequently invading Cambodian lands; in 1857 a joint Siamese-Vietnamese protectorate was established over Cambodia. From the 1860s France began establishing a presence in the region, initially in modern Cambodia and Vietnam, and the colony of French Indochina was created in 1887, also including Laos. A partial boundary between Cambodia and Cochinchina (southern Vietnam) in its southernmost section by the Gulf coast was drawn by the French in 1868–69 and then ratified in 1870. This boundary was then modified slightly in 1873. In 1904 Đắk Lắk was transferred from Laos to Annam (central Vietnam) and Stung Treng province transferred from Laos to Cambodia, with the rest of the Cambodia–Vietnam boundary as far north as the Srepok River then being delimited. Various small adjustments were made to the alignment after this in the years 1914, 1932, 1933, 1935 and 1936. In 1939 Jules Brévié, Governor-General of French Indochina, divided the islands in the Gulf of Thailand on a purely administrative basis with the so-called 'Brévié line', however a scheduled allocation of the islands between Cambodia and Vietnam never took place. In 1942 another small adjustment to the frontier was made in the vicinity of the Bassac River.

In 1954 both Cambodia and Vietnam gained full independence, however the latter was split into a Communist North and a capitalist South, with Cambodia bordering South Vietnam only. The border remained undemarcated and numerous areas, as well as the Gulf islands, remained in dispute. Furthermore, Khmer nationalists laid claim to much of the Mekong delta area of southern Vietnam (called Kampuchea Krom), based on the fact that historically these were Khmer lands.

During the Vietnam War the border was crossed by Viet Cong supply lines, most notably the southern stretch of the Ho Chi Minh Trail by the Communist Party of Vietnam (CPV), causing it to be heavily bombed by American forces. In return for tolerating the Viet Cong presence along the border, Cambodia attempted to extract territorial concessions, though with little success. On 17 April 1975, the totalitarian Khmer Rouge regime led by the Communist Party of Kampuchea (CPK) took over Cambodia including the capital Phnom Penh and made gaining some or all of Kampuchea Krom a priority as the Cambodian Civil War came to an end. A brief Khmer invasion occurring the day after Saigon fell to North Vietnam was repulsed on 30 April 1975 and has renamed Ho Chi Minh City, and border discussions then took place from 1976 to 1977. On 5 January 1976, Cambodia was renamed to Democratic Kampuchea under the Marxist-Leninist leaders of Pol Pot and Khieu Samphan. Vietnam was reunified on 2 July 1976. With relations deteriorating numerous skirmishes occurred along the border, with Vietnam eventually invading Cambodia in 1978 and ousting the Khmer Rouge by the Vietnamese Army on 7 January 1979. Discussions on the border thereafter reconvened in 1983, with both sides in 1985 pledging to recognise the border as it was at independence. Discussions continued into the early 1990s. A treaty was signed in 2005, followed by on-the-ground demarcation, which was completed in 2012.

Now, the Cambodian-Vietnam border is known for its economic activity, facilitating bilateral trade between Vietnam and Cambodia accounting to US$8.7 billion just in the first eight months of 2026. Much of these goods are cashew nuts, natural rubber, manufactured beverages, such as Angkor Beer and Oyoshi ready to be exported to the rest of Asia via Vietnam's ports and airways.

== Border crossings ==
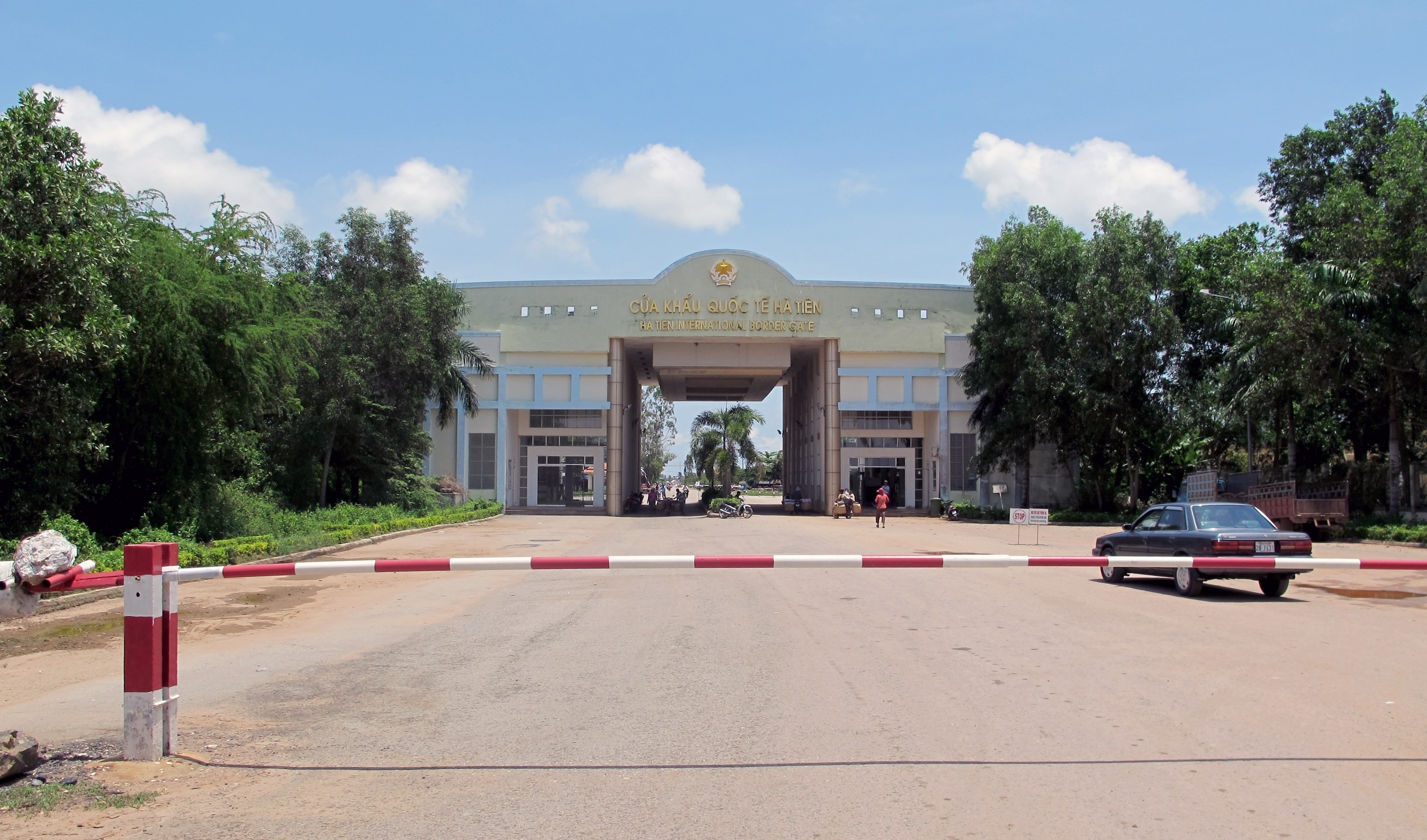
Border gate at Hà Tiên

There are several border crossings:

- Bavet (Bavet, Svay Rieng, Cambodia) – Mộc Bài (Bến Cầu, Tây Ninh, Vietnam)
- Prey Voa (Kampong Rou, Svay Rieng, Cambodia) – Bình Hiệp (Kiến Tường, Long An, Vietnam)
- Trapeang Sre (Snuol, Kratié, Cambodia) – Hua Lư (Lộc Ninh, Bình Phước, Vietnam)
- Trapeang Phlong (Trapeang Phlong, Tboung Khmum, Cambodia) – Xa Mát ( Tân Biên, Tây Ninh, Vietnam)
- Muern Chey ( Kamchay Mear, Prey Veng, Cambodia) – Tân Nam ( Tân Biên, Tây Ninh, Vietnam)
- Kaoh Roka (Peam Chor, Prey Veng, Cambodia) – Thường Phước ( Hồng Ngự, Đồng Tháp, Vietnam)
- Banteay Chakrei (Preah Sdach, Prey Veng, Cambodia) – Dinh Bà (Tân Hồng, Đồng Tháp, Vietnam)
- Kaam Samnor (Leuk Daek, Kandal, Cambodia) – Vĩnh Xương (Tân Châu, An Giang, Vietnam)
- Phnom Den (Kiri Vong, Takéo, Cambodia) – Tịnh Biên (Tịnh Biên, An Giang, Vietnam)
- Prek Chak (Kampong Trach, Kampot, Cambodia) – Hà Tiên (Hà Tiên, Kiên Giang, Vietnam)
- Oyadav (Ou Ya Dav, Ratanakiri, Cambodia) – Lệ Thanh (Đức Cơ, Gia Lai, Vietnam)

== See also ==
- Cambodia–Vietnam relations
- Communist Party of Kampuchea (CPK)
- Kampuchea Revolutionary Army (RAK)
- Kampuchean People's Representative Assembly
- Patriotic and Democratic Front of the Great National Union of Kampuchea (PDFGNUK)
