= The Terror of War =

1972 photograph

The Terror of War; Phan Thi Kim Phuc is the girl depicted running naked in the center of the image

The Terror of War, colloquially known as Napalm Girl, is a photograph taken on 8 June 1972. It shows a naked 9-year-old girl, Phan Thi Kim Phuc, running toward the camera from a South Vietnamese napalm strike that mistakenly hit Trảng Bàng village instead of nearby North Vietnamese troops. It is credited as one of the most famous images of the Vietnam War and an indictment of the effects of war on innocent victims in general.

Nick Ut was credited as the photographer, receiving several awards including World Press Photo of the Year. After the documentary The Stringer (2025) explored the possibility that stringer Nguyễn Thành Nghệ may have taken the photo, both the Associated Press (AP) and World Press Photo (WPP) conducted investigations. AP's conclusion was that "it is possible Nick Ut took the photo." WPP's conclusion was that Ut was unlikely to be the author. AP continues to credit Ut, while WPP suspended attribution of the image.

== Circumstances ==
Wain (right) assisting the children

On 8 June 1972, South Vietnamese forces advanced on Trảng Bàng, which was held by North Vietnamese forces. As a group of civilians and South Vietnamese soldiers fled from a Caodai temple to the safety of South Vietnamese–held positions, a pilot of the South Vietnamese Air Force, flying an A-1E Skyraider, mistook the group for enemy soldiers and diverted to drop napalm. According to a contemporaneous report by Fox Butterfield, the bombing burned five civilians and six soldiers, including nine-year-old Phan Thi Kim Phuc, who tore off her burning clothes. A photographer, initially identified as Nick Ut, captured an image of Phuc and other villagers fleeing the attack. Ut, ITN correspondent Christopher Wain, and South Vietnamese soldiers assisted Phuc, although descriptions vary as to the role of each. According to Denise Chong's The Girl in the Picture, Wain halted Phuc, Ut translated her request for water, and the soldiers doused her with their canteens. Other accounts include Wain or Ut extinguishing her.

By most accounts, Ut then took Phuc and at least one other victim to a hospital in Củ Chi or Saigon. Several days later she was transported to a specialist facility, thanks to parallel efforts by Wain and her father. Phuc sustained third-degree burns or worse over 30 to 35% of her body, including all of her left arm and almost all of her back. Two civilians were killed in the bombing, both of them children of Phuc's aunt Anh, including Phuc's three-year-old "favorite cousin" Danh. Phuc's brother Tam was superficially burned and recovered after a month.

== Composition and publication ==
The black-and-white photo depicts multiple children running toward the photographer. Closest to the photographer, on the extreme left of the image, is a boy, described by Barbie Zelizer as "crying in terror as his open mouth turned downward like a mask of human tragedy". Toward the center of the image, a bit behind him, Phuc runs with her arms stretched out to the side, fully naked, apparently screaming. Toward the right of the frame, slightly farther back, two children run holding each other's hands. Another child and several soldiers make up the middle background.

According to Ut, he had four cameras—a Leica M2, a Leica M3, and two Nikon Fs—and shot eight rolls of film in black-and-white. The M2 was historically credited as the one with which he took the photo. According to the AP's updated report, the photo was likely taken with a Pentax. An analysis of photos and motion pictures of Ut and Nghe at the scene concluded that Ut was carrying two Nikon F SLRs and two Leica M2 rangefinders but no Pentax, and that Nghe was carrying only a Pentax.

When the film was developed at AP's Saigon office, staff remarked that AP's unwritten policy was not to run photos of frontal nudity, especially of children. But Horst Faas, the head of the bureau's photo department, ordered the photo to be transmitted. The AP titled the photo Accidental Napalm Attack. At Faas's direction, a technician created an airbrushed print to avoid a shadow over Phuc's crotch being misinterpreted as pubic hair, but most publications chose to use the unaltered photo.

== Response ==
Audiotapes of then-president Richard Nixon in conversation with his chief of staff, H. R. Haldeman, show that Nixon doubted the veracity of the photograph, musing whether it may have been "fixed".

The photograph, attributed to Ut, won a number of major photographic awards.

Organizations	Year	Category	Result	Ref.
George Polk Awards	1972	News Photography	Won	
Overseas Press Club	1972	Best Photographs, Daily Newspaper or Wire Service	Won	
Pulitzer Prize	1973	Spot News Photography	Won	
World Press Photo	1973	Photo of the Year	Won	

== Legacy ==
In September 2016, a Norwegian newspaper published an open letter to Mark Zuckerberg after censorship was imposed on this photograph placed on the newspaper's Facebook page. Half of the ministers in the Norwegian government shared the photograph on their Facebook pages, among them prime minister Erna Solberg from the Conservative Party. Several of the Facebook posts, including the Prime Minister's post, were deleted by Facebook, but later that day, Facebook reinstated the picture and said, "The value of permitting sharing outweighs the value of protecting the community by removal". In 2022, Ut gave a copy of the photograph to Pope Francis.

== Authorship dispute ==
According to Ut, he set his camera aside to rescue Phuc and later delivered his film to the AP.

A 2025 documentary, The Stringer, directed by Gary Knight of the VII Foundation, investigates the authorship of the photo and states that it was not taken by Ut but by a Vietnamese stringer (freelancer) named Nguyễn Thành Nghệ. Ut and the AP both denied the claim, although AP later backed away from their previous full-throated denial. One review remarked, "Among the most compelling arguments put forth in the film is a visual timeline created using all available photographic and film evidence to place Ut out of position when the 'Terror of War' image would have been created, with Nghệ in the correct spot." World Press Photo also conducted an in-depth investigation which concluded based on an analysis of the location, distance and the camera used, that it was unlikely that Ut took the photo and that either Nghệ (who did claim authorship) or Huỳnh Công Phúc (a military photographer and sometime freelancer for the AP who died in 2009 and never claimed it) was likely to have taken the photo. The AP carried out its own investigation into the photographer and published its findings in an initial report based largely on witness statements and a second, larger report based on technical analysis. They concluded that "it is possible Nick Ut took the photo." The French forensic photography expert Tristan da Cunha identified the exact equipment that Ut and Nghe were carrying, reconstructed the order in which the extant images were taken, identified the film in each camera, and critiqued the prior reports. He concluded, "it becomes untenable to continue affirming that Nick Ut is the author of the NG photo."

Following their own investigation, World Press Photo announced that it would suspend the attribution of authorship to the photo going forwards. The AP did not change the credit to Ut, citing the absence of conclusive evidence.

Following the release of The Stringer, Nick Ut filed suit against Netflix and the VII Foundation for public defamation in March 2026; the suit will go to trial in France in 2027.

Of the people that were present when the photo was taken, Phan Thi Kim Phuc herself maintains that Nick Ut took the photo, as does former New York Times journalist Fox Butterfield, who was also present at the scene. David Burnett, another photojournalist who was present, also attests that Nick Ut took the photo, stating "He’s the only one who could have taken that picture."

== See also ==
- "Napalm Sticks to Kids" – Vietnam War-era song and cadence
- Saigon Execution – 1968 photograph by Eddie Adams
