= Bao Nguyen =

Vietnamese-American film director, cinematographer and producer

- Nguyen in 2026
- Born: Bao Nguyen; Silver Spring, Maryland, U.S.
- Occupations: Director; Cinematographer; Producer
- Years active: 2009–present

Bao Minh Nguyen (Vietnamese: Nguyễn Minh Bảo), known professionally is Bao Nguyen (Vietnamese: Bảo Nguyễn), is an American film director, cinematographer and producer. He is known for directing the feature documentaries Live from New York! (2015), Be Water (2020), The Greatest Night in Pop (2024), The Stringer (2025) and BTS: The Return (2026).

== Early life and education ==
Nguyen was born in Silver Spring, Maryland, to Vietnamese parents who arrived in the United States as refugees after the Vietnam War. His parents ran a small fabric store in Maryland, where he often worked during his youth. He earned a Bachelor of Arts degree in Politics and International Relations from New York University and a Master of Fine Arts in film from the School of Visual Arts in New York City. Since 2011, Nguyen has moved to live and work in Ho Chi Minh City, Vietnam.

== Career ==
Nguyen’s work often explores themes of identity, culture, and media, tracing how individuals and institutions shape collective memory and social meaning. His films have screened at the Sundance and Tribeca festivals and aired on HBO, NBC, PBS, ESPN, and Netflix.

=== 2030 (2014) ===
In 2014, Bao Nguyen worked in Ho Chi Minh City, Vietnam as a cinematographer and producer for the film 2030 (known in Vietnam as Nước), a science fiction romance written and directed by Nguyễn Võ Nghiêm Minh. The film screened at the Berlin International Film Festival.

=== Live from New York! (2015) ===
Nguyen’s debut feature documentary, Live from New York!, examines the then-40-year history of the television series Saturday Night Live and its cultural impact. The film premiered at the 2015 Tribeca Film Festival. Critics highlighted the ambitious archival scope of the project.

=== Be Water (2020) ===
In 2020, Nguyen directed Be Water, part of the ESPN 30 for 30 documentary series. The film explores the life and legacy of martial-arts legend Bruce Lee and situates that story within the broader context of Asian-American representation in media. It premiered at Sundance and later aired on ESPN/Disney+.

=== The Greatest Night in Pop (2024) ===
Nguyen’s 2024 feature documentary The Greatest Night in Pop chronicles the record-setting 1985 charity single We Are the World, which brought together dozens of the era’s biggest pop stars to record the song for African famine relief. The film premiered at Sundance on January 19, 2024, and was released globally on Netflix. The documentary received several major nominations and awards:

- Nominated for three 2024 Primetime Creative Arts Emmy Awards: Outstanding Documentary or Nonfiction Special; Outstanding Directing for a Documentary/Nonfiction Program (for Nguyen); Outstanding Sound Editing for a Nonfiction or Reality Program.
- Won the 2024 Critics’ Choice Documentary Award for Best Historical Documentary.
- Nominated for the 2025 Grammy Award for Best Music Film.
- Won the 2025 Producers Guild of America Award for Outstanding Producer of Televised or Streamed Motion Pictures.

=== The Stringer (2025) ===
In 2025, Nguyen directed The Stringer, a documentary investigating the authorship of the 1972 Vietnam War photograph popularly known as The Terror of War (“Napalm Girl”). The film follows photographer Gary Knight’s two-year investigation into whether the credited photographer was correct and explores issues around visual media, identity and conflict journalism. The film premiered at the 2025 Sundance Film Festival.

=== BTS: The Return (2026) ===
In 2026, Nguyen directed BTS: The Return, a documentary following the long-awaited return of South Korean boy band BTS as the seven members gathered in Los Angeles to create new music.

=== Other works ===
Alongside his work as a director, Bảo Nguyễn is one of the founding members of EAST Films—a production company established by Vietnamese filmmakers both within the country and abroad, such as Hàm Trần, Phan Gia Nhật Linh, Jenni Trang Lê, and Kenneth Nguyen, along with numerous collaborators, with a focus on attracting investment and developing Vietnamese film projects.

== Personal life ==
Bảo Nguyễn used to date Vietnamese rapper and singer-songwriter Suboi for seven years before proposing her in 2017. They have broken up in 2019.

== Filmography ==
=== Film ===
Year	Title	Director	Writer	Note
2015	Rhino Man	Yes	No	Short film
2015	The Poll Dance	Yes	No	Short film
2016	The Future of Social Security	Yes	No	Short film
2021	Together	Yes	Yes	Short film

As cinematographer

- Saigon Electric (2011)

As producer

- Ròm (2019)
- Maika (2022)
- Child of Dust (2025)

=== Documentary ===
Year	Title	Director	Note
2009	Motoo	Yes	Also editor
2010	A Tree Falls in the Forest	Yes	Also editor
2011	Julian	Yes	Also editor
2015	Live from New York!	Yes	
2019	Where Are You Really From?	Yes	Also writer
2020	Be Water	Yes	
2024	The Greatest Night in Pop	Yes	
2025	The Stringer	Yes	
2026	BTS: The Return	Yes	
2027	Spectacle: Michael Jackson at the Super Bowl	Yes	

As cinematographer

- Motoo (2009)
- A Tree Falls in the Forest (2010)
- It's a lonely life - Lillian Schwartz (2010)
- Julian (2011)
- Mr. Cao Goes to Washington (2012)
- Why Am I Still Alive (2012)
- Half the Sky (2012)
- Once in a Lullaby: PS 22 Chorus Documentary (2012)
- Where Heaven Meets Hell (2013)
- Monk by Blood (2013)
- 2030 (2014)
- Live from New York! (2015)
- Grit (2018)
- Broken Harmony (2019)

As producer

- Motoo (2009)
- A Tree Falls in the Forest (2010)
- Julian (2011)
- Once in a Lullaby: PS 22 Chorus Documentary (2012)
- Where Heaven Meets Hell (2013)
- Monk by Blood (2013)
- 2030 (2014)
- Be Water (2020)

=== Television ===
Year	Title	Director	Note
2015	Employed Identity	Yes	TV series
2019	We Gon' Be Alright	Yes	4 episodes

As cinematographer

- Black Market: Dispatches (2016)

As producer

- We Gon' Be Alright (2019)
- See Us Unite for Change (2021)
