= Mộc Bài =

Border crossing between Vietnam and Cambodia

Coordinates: 11°04′36″N 106°10′30″E

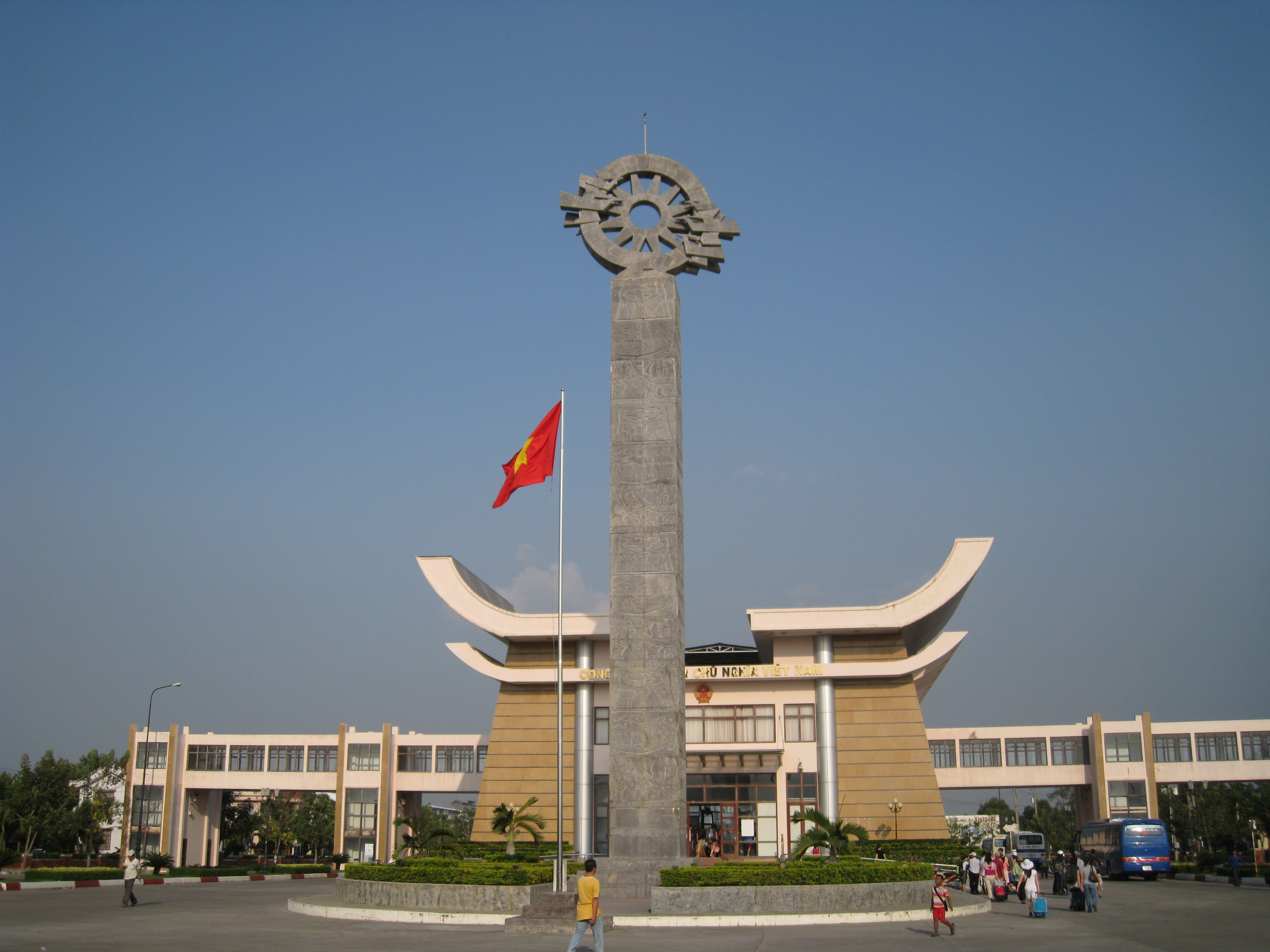
Mộc Bài border gate

Mộc Bài is an international border gate between Vietnam and Cambodia located in Tây Ninh Province, Vietnam. Its counterpart across the border is the Bavet border gate, Svay Rieng Province, Cambodia. As it is located on the main highway between Ho Chi Minh City and Phnom Penh, the border crossing is one of the busiest land entry points into Vietnam.

== Transportation ==
The border crossing is part of the Trans-Asia Highway connecting Phnom Penh and Ho Chi Minh City. In Vietnam, the border crossing is on Vietnam's National Highway 22 which goes through Củ Chi to Ho Chi Minh City 70 km away.

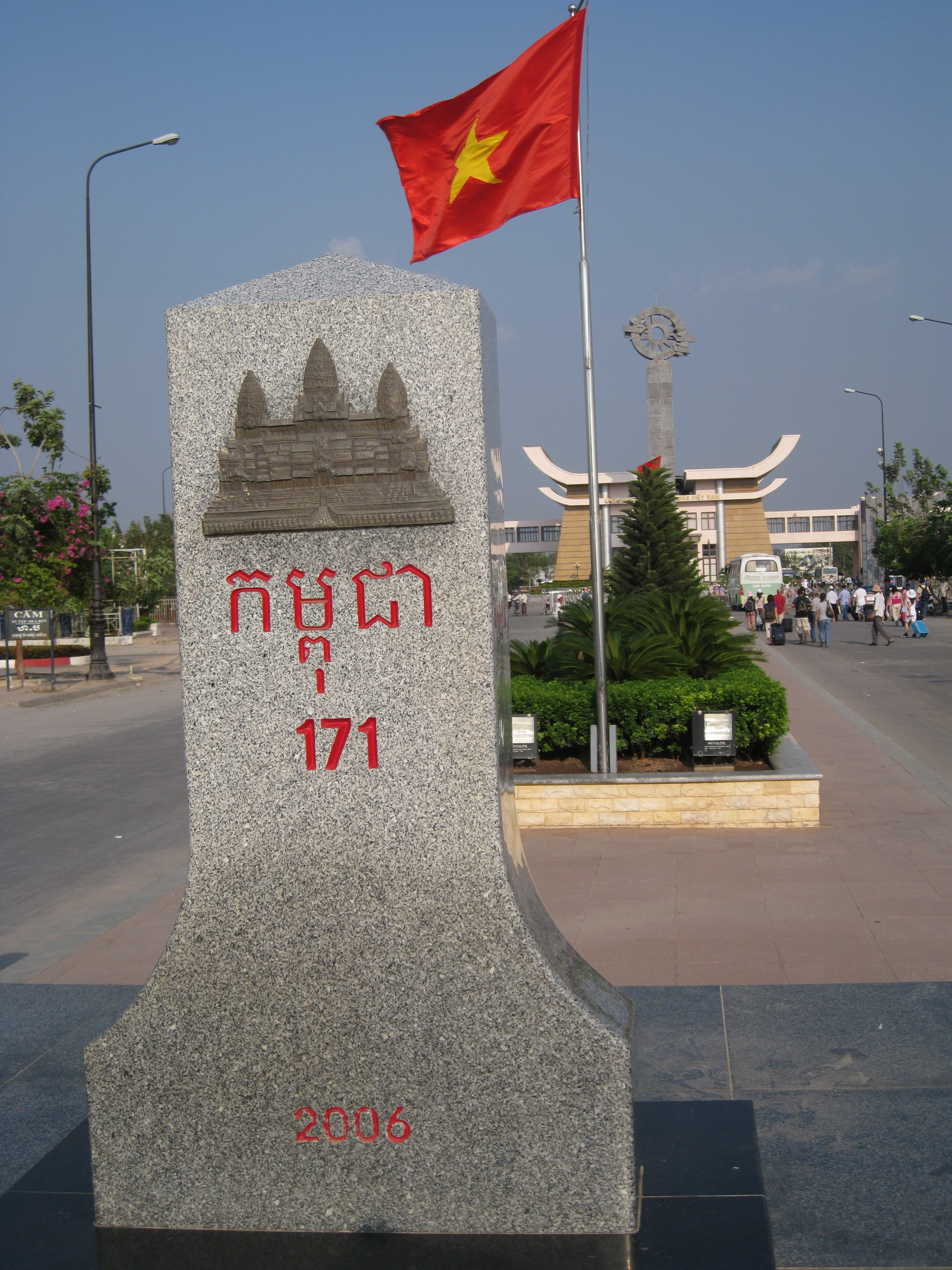
Looking from the Cambodian side towards Vietnam

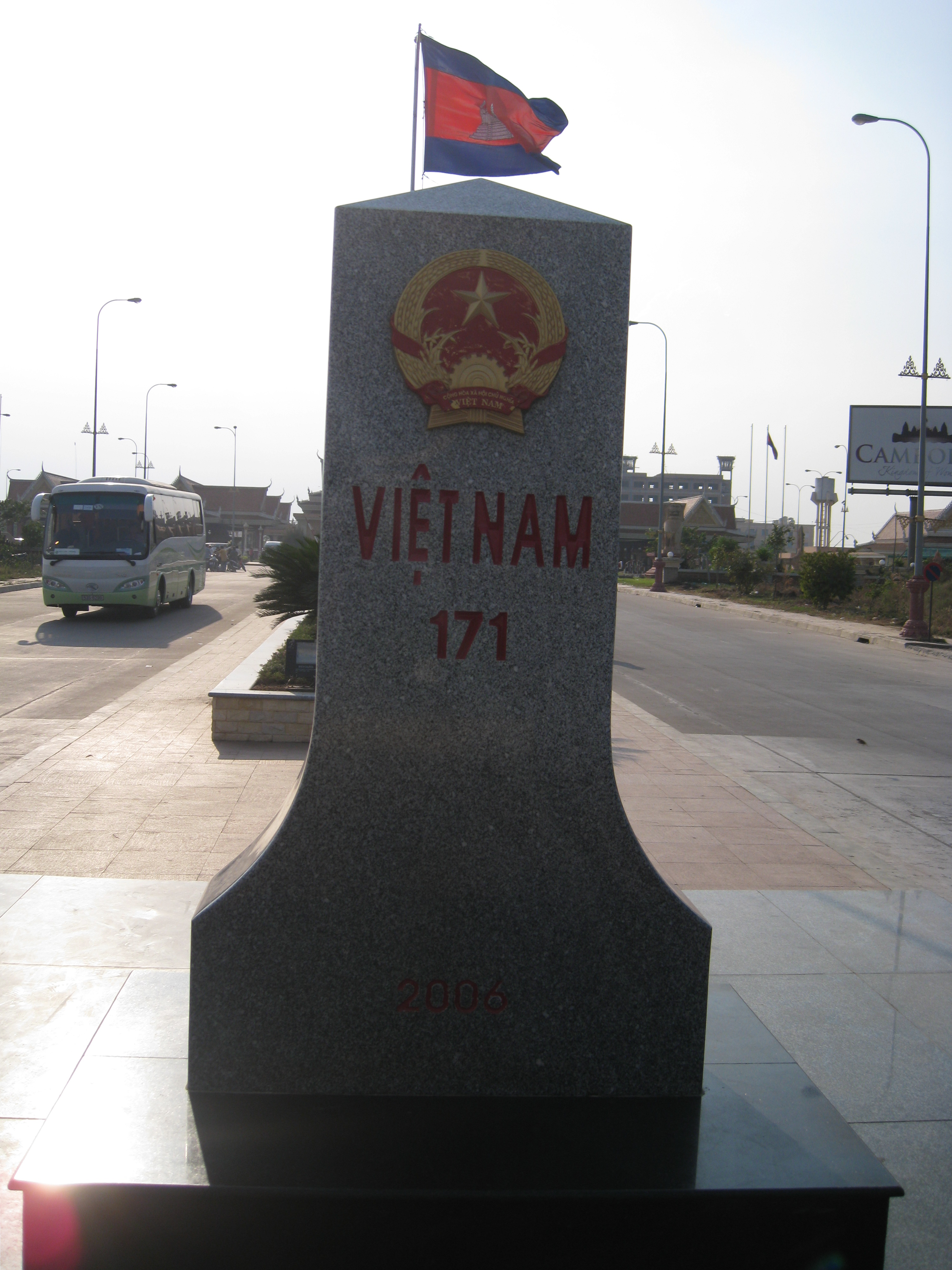
Looking from the Vietnamese side towards Cambodia

== Vietnamese E-visas ==
Besides the conventional visas for entering Vietnam, the checkpoint is also an entry point for Vietnamese E-visas.

== Economic zone ==
The Mộc Bài economic zone (BQL Khu kinh tế cửa khẩu Mộc Bài) is 21,284 hectares in area, and is included in Bến Cầu and Trảng Bàng districts, Tây Ninh Province. This area is 70 km from Ho Chi Minh City and 170 km from Phnom Penh.

== Gallery ==
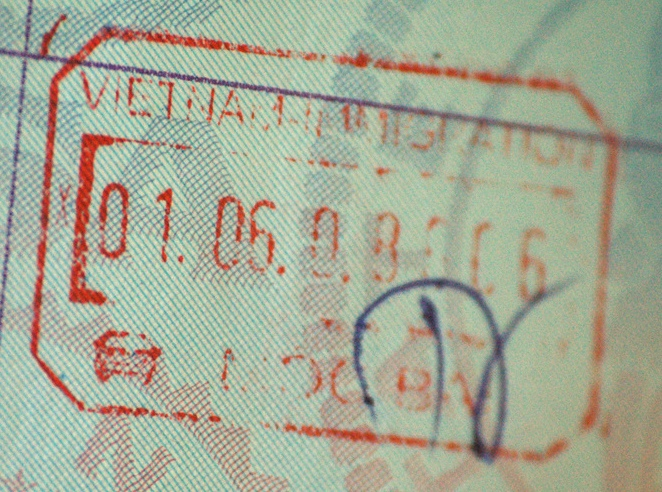
Exit stamp from Moc Bai.

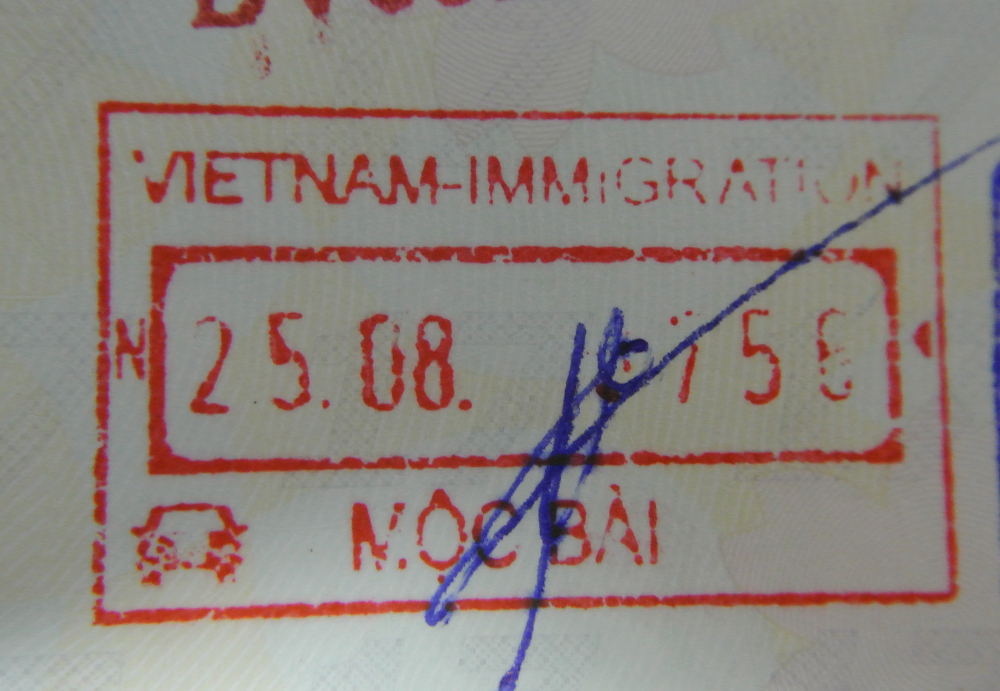
Entry stamp from Moc Bai.

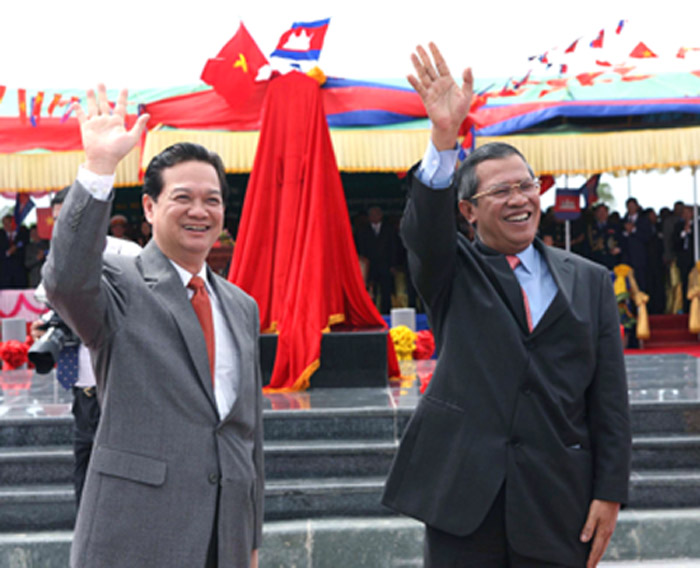
Nguyen Tan Dung Vietnam Prime Minister and Hun Sen, Cambodia Prime Minister opened ceremony of boundary stone at Mộc Bài-Bavet border.

== See also ==
- AH1
