= Napalm Sticks to Kids =

Vietnam War-era song and cadence

"Napalm Sticks to Kids" is a published track and informal US military cadence that originates from the Vietnam War, during which napalm—an incendiary gel—saw extensive use by the US military.

== Origin ==
John E. Woodruff, reporting for Baltimore's The Sun from Phước Vĩnh Base Camp in June 1970, wrote that "Napalm Sticks to Kids" was already a recorded song being played by soldiers, heard playing from military hooches and Army helicopters there; he credited the song to "a group of helicopter pilots". United States Senator Stephen M. Young corroborated that report two months later, submitting it into the Congressional Record.

Covered Wagon Musicians was a musical ensemble of active-duty military personnel stationed at Mountain Home Air Force Base. According to the band and Slow Death, United States Army and Air Force personnel assigned to the 1st Cavalry Division originally wrote the words to "Napalm Sticks to Kids" while stationed in South Vietnam. Each person wrote a verse about actions in which they participated, "express[ing] their collective bitterness toward the military that had turned them into murderers." The band claimed that Sergeant Mike Elliot, one of those Vietnam veterans, had the lyrics published in the first issue of Mountain Home's Helping Hand newsletter, and that it spread throughout the military world from there.

== Publications ==
"Napalm Sticks to Kids"

Song by Covered Wagon Musicians

from the album We Say No to Your War!
- Released: 1972
- Length: 4:18
- Label: Paredon Records

In 1972, Covered Wagon Musicians released their version as the twelfth song (sixth on the B-side) their album We Say No to Your War!; released by Paredon Records, the song is 4:18 long.

Versions of "Napalm Sticks to Kids" have also appeared in multiple military song books, including:

- 43d Tactical Fighter Squadron. "Flying and Fighting...". In Hunt, Jim; Seip, Norm (eds.). 43 TFS Song Book: Bawdy Ballads, Tasteless Toasts, Meaningless Miscellaneous – via Internet Archive.
- 497th Tactical Fighter Squadron. "Oldies but Goodies". The Hooter Songbook: Of Favorite Fighter Ballads, Love Songs, Bar Room Hymns and Other Indispensable Memorabilia. pp. 103–104 – via Internet Archive.
- 335th Fighter Squadron. "Selected Songs". 335th FS Chiefs Songbook. p. 27 – via Internet Archive.
- 44th Fighter Squadron (4 July 1999). "Songs!". Vampire Fighter Pilot Songbook. p. 54 – via Internet Archive.
- 37th Bomb Squadron (1 June 2002). "Old Standards". The Bone Drivers Handbook. pp. 78–80 – via Internet Archive.

== Cadence ==
By the late 1980s, the "Napalm" cadence had been taught at training to all branches of the United States Armed Forces.

Flyin' low and feelin' mean,
Find a family by the stream.
Pick off a pair and hear 'em scream,
Cause napalm sticks to kids.

Family of gooks are sittin' in a ditch,
Little baby suckin' on his mama's tit.
Chemical burns don't give a shit,
Cause napalm sticks to kids.

— An Officer and a Gentleman,
quoted from an active-duty DI

The cadence was employed at the United States Naval Academy (USNA) from the early 1970s until the late 1980s when efforts were made to prohibit its singing. During pre-production of the 1982 film An Officer and a Gentleman, the screenplay was sent to the US Navy for approval in the hopes that the military would support production of the film. The Navy refused, citing as inaccurate: the film's vulgarity, offensive language, and amorality—including saying that "Napalm Sticks to Kids" was no longer used. Writer and producer Douglas Day Stewart disagreed, not only as a former Naval officer, but having previously interviewed an active Naval-officer trainer who dictated "Napalm Sticks to Kids". In response, Stewart interviewed a group of officer candidates at Naval Air Station Pensacola, who all confirmed that the cadence was still in widespread use. An Officer and a Gentleman did not modify the script to suit the Navy, and the film features aviation candidates chanting the cadence.

== Analysis ==
Soldiers stationed in Vietnam, listening to the song in June 1970, were undecided on whether the song was meant to protest the war itself or was "mocking a 'bad image' that many helicopter pilots and gunners feel they have acquired unfairly in the course of the war." Music historian Justin Brummer, editor of the Vietnam War Song Project, wrote in History Today that the song provides "an unflinching picture of the war" in which 388,000 long tons (394,000 t) of Napalm B were dropped on Indochina between 1963 and 1973.

Its verses delight in the application of superior US technology that rarely if ever actually hits the enemy: "the [singer] fiendishly narrates in first person one brutal scene after another: barbecued babies, burned orphans, and decapitated peasants in an almost cartoonlike litany." Since the mid-19th century, military cadences have been for improving morale, unit cohesion, and the weight of military labor. Carol Burke, a professor at the USNA, observed that "offensiveness drives cadences", noting examples of insubordination, sexual objectification of women, and the celebration of collateral damage. General William Westmoreland explained these topics: "Gallows humor is, after all, merely a defense mechanism for men engaged in perilous and distasteful duties."

The Terror of War by Nick Ut

The phrase was used as a slogan by anti-war protesters in the US, often accompanied by Nick Ut's Pulitzer Prize-winning photo, The Terror of War (8 June 1972). Burke interpreted the military cadence as a rebuke thereof, an effort of servicemembers to transform "the protesters' image of the American slaughterer, the 'baby killer,' into the haunting voice of someone who has seen the slaughter and come back having enjoyed it—a protest against a protest."
