= The Stringer =

2025 documentary

- Film poster
- Directed by: Bao Nguyen
- Written by: Terri Lichstein; Fiona Turner; Gary Knight; Graham Taylor
- Produced by: Fiona Turner; Terri Lichstein
- Cinematography: Bao Nguyen; Andrew Yuyi Truong; Ray Lavers
- Edited by: Graham Taylor
- Music by: Gene Back
- Production companies: XRM Media; The VII Foundation; Linlay Productions
- Distributed by: Netflix
- Release date: January 25, 2025 (Sundance)
- Running time: 100 minutes
- Languages: English; Vietnamese

The Stringer: The Man Who Took the Photo is a 2025 documentary film directed by Bao Nguyen. Centered on the Vietnam War photograph The Terror of War, more commonly referred to as Napalm Girl, depicting Phan Thi Kim Phuc running from a napalm attack, the film examines whether it was credited to the right photographer. It presents a two-year investigation on the matter, arguing that a photo stringer named Nguyen Thanh Nghe actually took it rather than the officially credited photographer Nick Ut.

The film premiered at the Sundance Film Festival on January 25, 2025. It was a last-minute selection for the festival, having been added to the lineup on January 7. Nguyen Thanh Nghe was in attendance at the premiere screening. There, he said, "I took the photo."

The Associated Press (AP) has continuously presented rebutting claims and evidence against the film, primarily with a lengthy report written over the course of six months, as well as supporting statements from Ut, Phuc, and his colleagues. In 2026, Ut filed a defamation case in French court against Netflix, Gary Knight, and VII Photo Agency.

== Background and allegations ==
The Terror of War, the photograph at the center of the documentary film's investigation

The infamous photograph of Phuc, nine years old at the time, was taken on June 8, 1972, following a Republic of Vietnam Air Force napalm attack on the village of Trảng Bàng. Considered one of the most famous photographs of all time, it was and has remained attributed to Ut.

Nguyen's film investigates whether a stringer actually took the photograph, claiming that it was intentionally misattributed to Ut. Photographer and VII Photo Agency co-founder Gary Knight led the two-year investigation which culminated in The Stringer; he had heard rumors about the photograph's incorrect credit a decade prior "at a reunion of Vietnam veteran journalists." Specifically, Knight heard it from Carl Robinson, a photo editor in the AP's Saigon bureau in 1972.

For The Stringer, Knight and Robinson met in 2022, after which the film's argument began taking shape. Robinson claimed that he had "received film from Ut and two Vietnamese stringers, including one whose name he could not recall who wasn't a regular AP freelancer, and had labeled the negatives meticulously, per AP standards." The front-facing picture that would later become known as "Napalm Girl" was chosen by AP picture editor Horst Faas; according to Robinson, Faas said to attribute the front-facing picture to Ut, specifically saying, "make it Nick Ut." According to Robinson, the photograph's wrongful attribution was an open secret and cover-up at AP. Robinson speculated that Faas felt guilty for the death of Ut’s brother, who had been killed on an assignment which Faas had given him in 1965. The photograph was then circulated worldwide and went on to win a Pulitzer Prize for Breaking News Photography for Ut.

Knight discovered possible evidence that the "Napalm Girl" photograph was actually taken by Nghe, who then sold it and other photographs to AP for $20. (At the time, Nghe was a driver for NBC and also a freelancer.) His brother-in-law, Tran Van Than, who was interviewed for the film, corroborated that he went to the AP office with Nghe that day. Altogether, the film includes 55 interviews from many individuals, including journalists who were present at the village in 1972. However, it does not include interviews with Ut or Phuc. Knight reported, "Both Út and the AP declined to be interviewed for the film... Ut refused multiple requests to talk to me..." Phuc has no memory of who took it but credits Ut.

Knight then went to the AP office in London to discuss the film and its findings. Knight wanted to see the press' archives, but AP wanted to see the film's research first. Knight then asked for an agreement where AP could not report on the film until it premiered, which it refused.

== Associated Press response ==
Prior to the film's premiere at Sundance, AP released an initial, 23-page report dated January 15, 2025 rebutting Nguyen's claims; at the time, officials there had not seen it. It relied almost exclusively on seven interviews; all seven individuals claimed that Ut took the photograph. The report also contested several of Robinson's claims as well as his legitimacy to make them, i.e. Robinson's own oral confirmation of Ut's credit in 2005. The Press also created a timeline of events and collected Ut's "strong body of work from the day" to attest to his capacity to have taken it at the time.

Ultimately, the report concluded: "In the absence of new, convincing evidence to the contrary, the AP has no reason to believe anyone other than Ut took the photo." However, the AP wrote that it would continue to probe questions around the photograph's credit and "take appropriate remedial actions" in the event of more conclusive evidence.

Ut has reaffirmed the claim that he took the photograph. Another photojournalist, David Burnett, who was on the ground in 1972, also reaffirmed that he had seen Ut take it. Burnett also challenged Robinson's allegations that Faas said "Make it Nick Ut"; he countered by stating that Faas had actually said "You do good work today, Ut."

Ut's lawyer, James Hornstein, has considered litigating the matter, stating that "we have a strong case for defamation." Hornstein also shared, on behalf of Phuc, that Phuc considered Nguyen's film to be an "outrageous and false attack" on Ut and reaffirmed that Ut saved her life. Additionally, Ut sent a cease and desist letter to the film's distributor and Sundance, threatening them in a defamation case if they went through with the film's presentation. Phuc's uncle also defended Ut's credit.

AP issued an "updated," 97-page report dated May 6, 2025 detailing a more technical analysis that included an examination of the subtle but distinct differences in the film gate of the different candidate camera types. It showed that the photo was taken with a Pentax SLR—the type that Nghe carried—and not a Leica rangefinder—the type that Ut carried. That second report concluded "it is possible Nick Ut took the photo."

== Critical reception ==
On the review aggregator website Rotten Tomatoes, the film has a 92% "Fresh" rating, based on 24 reviews.

David Friend, writing for Vanity Fair, wrote that "the power of the film does not reside in the filmmakers' investigative ingenuity. The movie rises and falls on the testimony of Nghe—and the memories movingly recounted by his family members, including his daughters and his brother-in-law, Tran Van Than. These accounts are riveting." However, Friend also acknowledged some of the film's "missing pieces" such as a lack of testimony from Ut and Phuc. He also found it "unconvincing" that the AP intentionally covered up the photograph's wrongful credit while recognizing the strength of the AP's rebuttal. Ultimately, Friend concluded: "See the film and judge for yourself."

The Hollywood Reporter found Nguyen and Knight's account of the photograph "convincing" and concluded that "The story that Nguyen's film methodically but sensitively dismantles is an indelible part of the collective unconscious, and a key element of the story of AP... Its response, as reported by the filmmakers, will surprise no one who’s ever been gaslighted by an organization. It’s dispiriting nonetheless."

RogerEbert.com concluded that the film "builds to a scene of forensic investigation that is just phenomenal as a team of French experts takes photos and footage from that day to prove near-conclusively who took the shot... In an era when the very institution of journalism is in decline, it's almost comforting to see people like Knight fighting for its validity."

Flickering Myth gave the film four out of five stars, writing that "As much as the film is about questioning the Associated Press, who certainly seem guilty and powerful enough to cut any whistleblower down to size, there is something more insidious at play of trusted, mostly white journalists not only potentially toying with history but the lives of Vietnamese war correspondents." Moveable Fest similarly argued that the film's most "powerful conclusion" was demonstrating how Vietnamese media lacked acknowledgment for their contributions to the reportage of the Vietnam War.

Yunghi Kim, a photojournalist and Pulitzer Prize finalist, called the film an "attempted slander of a beloved trailblazing Asian photographer by a group of white producers." Nguyen countered by stating that the film had a team of mostly people of color and women.
