= Nick Ut =

Vietnamese-American photographer & photojournalist (born 1951)

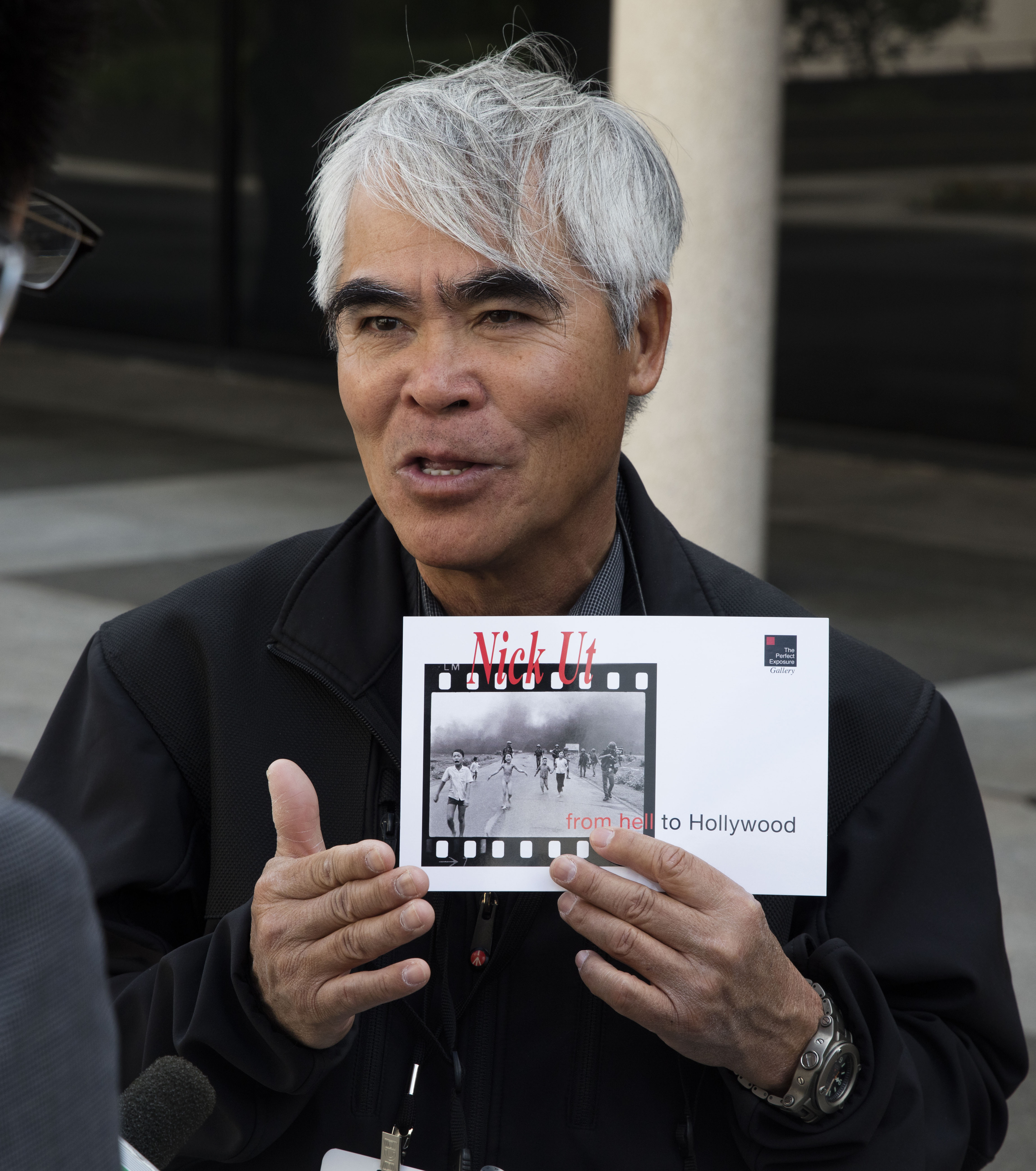
- Ut in 2016 holding a copy of The Terror of War
- Born: Huỳnh Công Út; March 29, 1951 (age 75); Bình Quới, Châu Thành, Long An, State of Vietnam, French Union
- Citizenship: American
- Occupation: Photojournalism
- Notable credit(s): Pulitzer Prize; World Press Photo - Withdrawn; National Medal of Arts

Huỳnh Công Út, known professionally as Nick Ut (born March 29, 1951), is a Vietnamese-American photographer who worked for the Associated Press in Los Angeles. He won both the 1973 Pulitzer Prize for Spot News Photography and the 1973 World Press Photo of the Year for the 1972 photograph The Terror of War, depicting children running away from a napalm bombing attack during the Vietnam War. Since the release of the documentary The Stringer in 2025, the authorship of the photograph has been disputed; the documentary identified Nguyễn Thành Nghệ as the author, AP stood with the attribution to Ut, and World Press Photo suspended the authorship attribution until more evidence is available. Ut retired in 2017. Examples of his work may be found in the collection of the National Gallery of Art in Washington, DC.

== Early life ==
Nick Ut was born on March 29, 1951, in Long An, Vietnam, which was then part of French Indochina.

== Career ==
Ut began to take photographs for the Associated Press when he was 15, just after his older brother Huynh Thanh My, another AP photographer, was killed in Vietnam. His closest friend in the Saigon bureau, Henri Huet, also died in 1971 after volunteering to take the weary Ut's place on an assignment.

After the fall of Saigon in 1975, Ut himself was wounded three different times in the war in his knee, arm, and stomach. He moved to Tokyo and arrived in Los Angeles two years later.

=== The Terror of War ===
The Terror of War was long credited to Nick Ut, but the authorship of the photograph is now disputed

The Terror of War, also colloquially called Napalm Girl, is a photograph that was long-credited to Ut but possibly taken by Nguyen Thanh Nghe or Huynh Cong Phuc, according to a World Press investigation. It features a naked 9-year-old girl, Phan Thi Kim Phuc, running toward the camera from a South Vietnamese napalm strike that mistakenly hit Trảng Bàng village instead of nearby North Vietnamese troops on June 8, 1972. It became one of the most famous images of the Vietnam War and an indictment of the effects of war on innocent victims in general.

The publication of the photograph was delayed due to the AP bureau's debate about transmitting a naked girl's photograph over the wire.

The photograph won many major photographic awards, including the World Press Photo for Photo of the Year, the George Polk Awards for News Photography, the 1973 Pulitzer Prize for Spot News Photography and the Overseas Press Club as Best Photograph, Daily Newspaper or Wire Service.

Before delivering his film with photographs, Ut set his camera aside to rush 9-year-old Kim Phuc to a hospital, where doctors saved her life. He said: "I cried when I saw her running... If I don’t help her, if something happened and she died, I think I’d kill myself after that".

... an editor at the AP rejected the photo of Kim Phuc running down the road without clothing because it showed frontal nudity. Pictures of nudes of all ages and sexes, and especially frontal views were an absolute no-no at the Associated Press in 1972 ... Horst argued by telex with the New York head-office that an exception must be made, with the compromise that no close-up of the girl Kim Phuc alone would be transmitted. The New York photo editor, Hal Buell, agreed that the news value of the photograph overrode any reservations about nudity.

— Nick Ut

In 2022, he gave a copy of the photograph to Pope Francis.

Audiotapes of then-president Richard Nixon in conversation with his chief of staff, H. R. Haldeman, show that Nixon doubted the veracity of the photograph, musing whether it may have been "fixed".

In September 2016, a Norway newspaper published an open letter to Mark Zuckerberg after censorship was imposed on this photograph placed on the newspaper's Facebook page. Half of the ministers in the Norwegian government shared the photograph on their Facebook pages, among them prime minister Erna Solberg from the Conservative Party. Several of the Facebook posts, including the Prime Minister's post, were deleted by Facebook, but later that day, Facebook reinstated the picture and said "the value of permitting sharing outweighs the value of protecting the community by removal".

A 2025 documentary, The Stringer investigates the authorship of the photo and claims that it was not taken by Ut but by a Vietnamese photographer named Nguyễn Thành Nghệ. Ut and Associated Press both deny the claim. After a year-long investigation into the authorship of the "Napalm Girl" photo, the Associated Press concluded there was no convincing evidence who the photographer is. World Press carried out its own investigation into the photographer and presented their findings on May 10 in Amsterdam. They concluded based on an analysis of the location, distance and the camera used, that it is more likely that the photo was taken by Nguyen Thanh Nghe or Huynh Cong Phuc, as they were in a better position than Ut. Given the remaining uncertainty, World Press announced that it would suspend the attribution of authorship to the photo going forwards. AP did not change the credit to Ut, citing the absence of conclusive evidence.

=== Later career ===
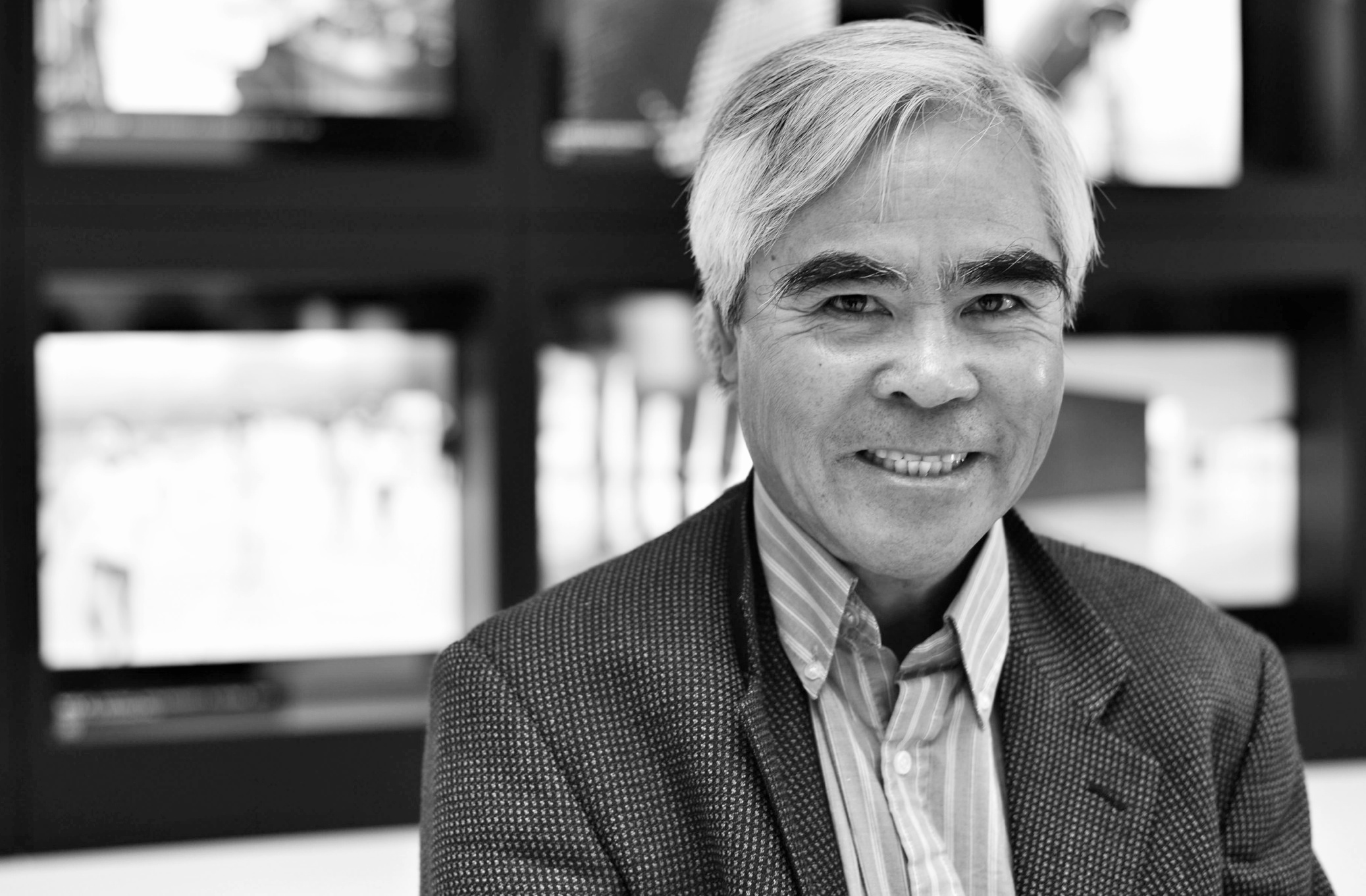
Nick Ut in 2015

His photos of a crying Paris Hilton in the back seat of a Los Angeles County Sheriff's cruiser on June 8, 2007, were published worldwide. However, Ut was photographing Hilton alongside photographer Karl Larsen. Two photographs emerged, the more famous of which showing Hilton was credited to Ut, despite being Larsen's photo.

After working for the Associated Press for 51 years, Ut retired in 2017. The photography community in Los Angeles held a retirement party to celebrate Ut's career and exhibit his work (including that iconic Pulitzer Prize-winning photo) at The Perfect Exposure Gallery in Los Angeles.

== Personal life ==
Ut is a United States citizen and is married with two children in Los Angeles.

== Accolades ==
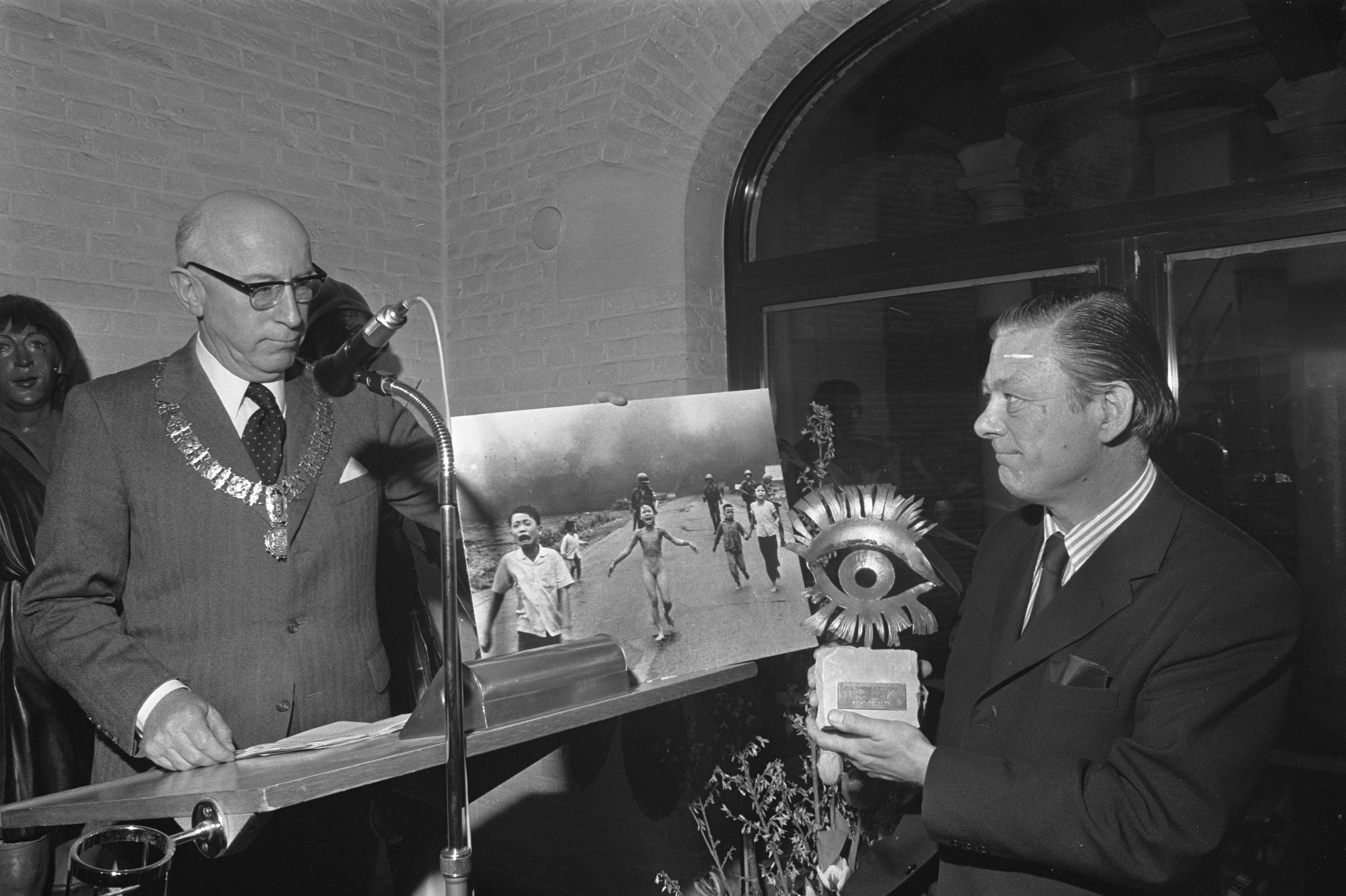
The Terror of War was awarded World Press Photo of the Year in 1973.

Ut was the 2014 Lucie Awards honoree for Achievement in Photojournalism. Kerala Media Academy in India presented him with the World Press Photographer Prize in 2019.

On the 40th anniversary of that Pulitzer Prize-winning photograph in September 2012, Ut became only the third person inducted into the Leica Hall of Fame for his contributions to photojournalism. In 2021, he became the first journalist to receive the National Medal of Arts, the highest award given to artists and arts patrons by the United States federal governments.

In 2021, Nick Ut was awarded the National Medal of Arts for his work during the Vietnam War. On the eve of receiving the award, Ut published an essay in Newsweek explaining why he decided to accept the medal from President Donald Trump despite political concerns surrounding the January 6 attack on the U.S. Capitol. The next day, while out to dinner with a friend, Nick Ut was attacked by a stranger in downtown Washington, DC. He fell to the ground, hit the metal fence surrounding the tree, and hurt his ribs, back, and leg. It is unclear whether this attack was for political reasons or just coincidental. After the incident, Ut received many calls asking about his health, including from Kim Phuc.

Organizations (Note: Awards, honors and other miscellaneous organizations are listed in alphabetical order.)	Year	Category	Result	Ref.
Asian American Journalists Association	2011	Lifetime Achievement Award	Honored	
Asian American Journalists Association	2017	Lifetime Achievement Award	Honored	
Federal government of the United States	2021	National Medal of Arts	Honored	
George Polk Awards	1972	News Photography	Won	
Kerala Media Academy	2019	World Photographer Prize	Won	
Leica Camera	2012	Leica Hall of Fame	Honored	
Los Angeles Press Club	2016	Joseph M. Quinn Award for Lifetime Achievement	Honored	
Lucie Awards	2014	Achievement in Photojournalism	Honored	
Overseas Press Club	1972	Best Photographs, Daily Newspaper or Wire Service	Won	
Pulitzer Prize	1973	Spot News Photography	Request withdrawn	
World Press Photo	1973	Photo of the Year	Request withdrawn	

== Collections ==
Ut's work is held in the National Gallery of Art, Washington, DC.
