= Horst Faas =

German photo- journalist (1933–2012)

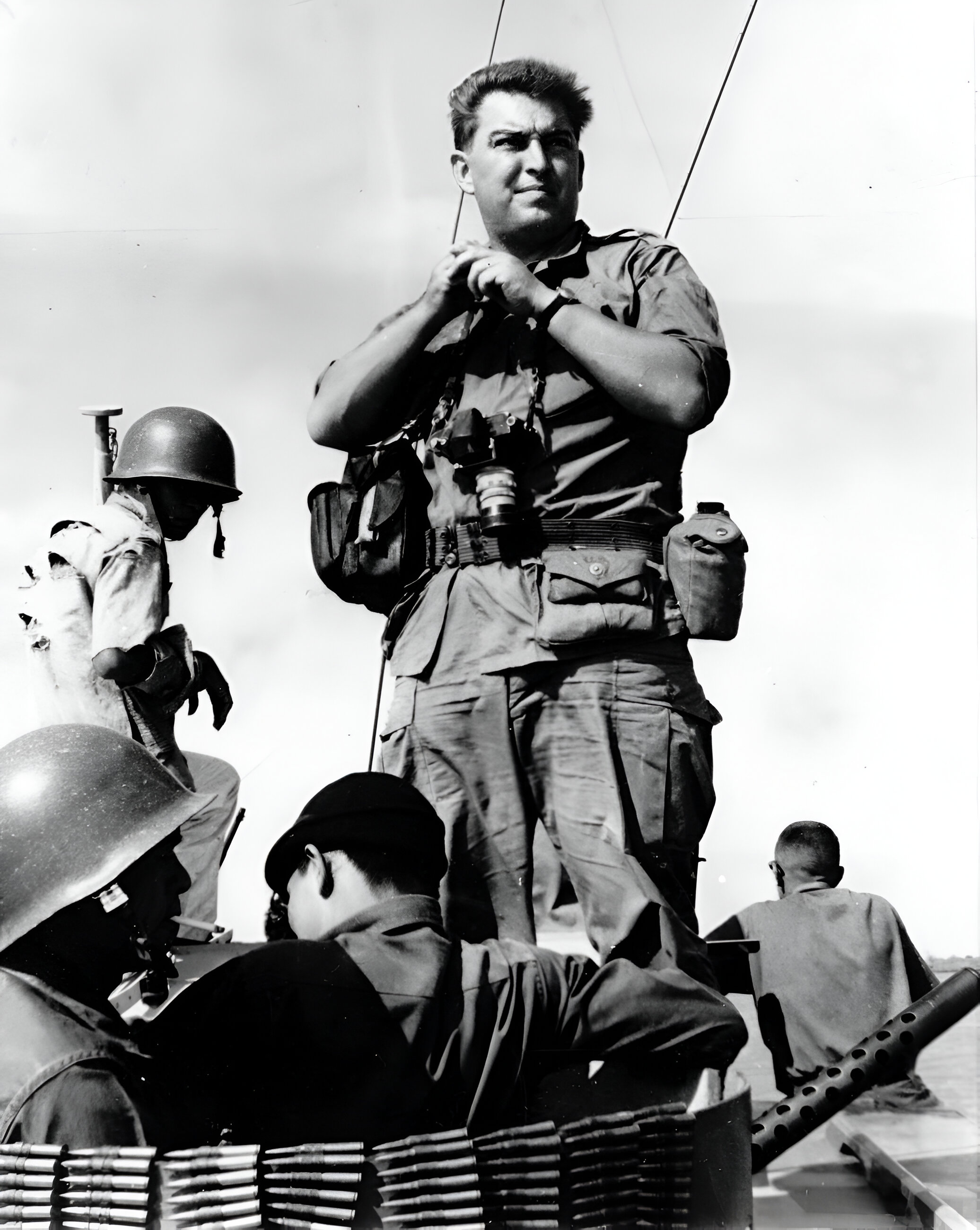
- Faas in March 1965
- Born: 28 April 1933; Berlin, Nazi Germany
- Died: 10 May 2012 (aged 79)
- Known for: Photojournalism
- Awards: Pulitzer Prize for Photography; Robert Capa Gold Medal; Dr. Erich Salomon Prize

Horst Faas (28 April 1933 – 10 May 2012) was a German photo-journalist and two-time Pulitzer Prize winner. He is best known for his images of the Vietnam War.

== Life ==
Horst Faas as born on 28 April 1933 in Berlin, which was then part of Nazi Germany. Faas began his photographic career in 1951 with the Keystone Agency, and by the age of 21 he was already covering major events concerning Indochina, including the peace negotiations in Geneva in 1954. In 1956 he joined the Associated Press (AP), where he acquired a reputation for being an unflinching hard-news war photographer, covering the wars in Vietnam and Laos, as well as in the Congo and Algeria. In 1962, he became AP's chief photographer for Southeast Asia, and was based in Saigon until 1974. His images of the Vietnam War won him a Pulitzer Prize in 1965. In 1967 he was severely wounded in the legs by a rocket-propelled grenade. In 1972, he collected a second Pulitzer, for his coverage of the conflict in Bangladesh. Inside Bangladesh, photographer Rashid Talukder considered it too dangerous to publish his photographs and he released them more than twenty years after Horst's photographs had appeared.

Faas is also famed for his work as a picture editor, and was instrumental in ensuring the publication of two of the most famous images of the Vietnam War. On 18 June 1965, during the Vietnam War with the 173rd Airborne Brigade on defense duty at Phuoc Vinh airstrip in South Vietnam he took the iconic photo of a soldier wearing a hand lettered "War Is Hell" slogan on his helmet. The notorious "Saigon Execution" photograph, showing the summary execution of a Viet Cong prisoner by Saigon police chief Nguyễn Ngọc Loan, taken by Eddie Adams in Saigon on 1 February 1968, was sent under his direction. Nick Ut's famous "Napalm Girl" photograph caused a huge controversy over at the AP bureau; an editor had objected to the photo, saying that the girl depicted was naked and that nobody would accept it. Faas ordered that Ut's photo be sent over the wire.

In September 1990, freelance photographer Greg Marinovich submitted a series of graphic photos of a crowd executing a man to the AP bureau in Johannesburg. Once again, AP editors were uncertain if the photos should be sent over the wire. One editor sent the images to Faas, who telegrammed back, "send all photos."

In 1976, Faas moved to London as AP's senior photo editor for Europe; he retired in 2004. In retirement he organised reunions of the wartime Saigon press corps and ran international photojournalism symposiums.

He produced four books on his career and other news photographers, including Requiem, a book about photographers killed on both sides of the Vietnam War, co-edited with fellow Vietnam War photojournalist Tim Page.

== Controversy over Ut photograph credit ==
Carl Robinson, a former Associated Press photo editor in Saigon during the Vietnam War, alleges that Faas had told him to change credit for the famous "Napalm Girl" image from having been taken by a photo stringer (freelance photographer) to AP photographer Nick Ut, who had also been at the scene and taken similar photographs. In the 2025 documentary film The Stringer, directed by Bao Nguyen, a group of journalists and investigators claim that the 'Napalm Girl' photograph was taken by Vietnamese stringer Nguyen Than Nghe.

Robinson speculates that Faas ordered the credit change to Ut because Faas felt guilty for the death of Ut's older brother, Huynh Thanh My, on an assignment Faas had given him. Shortly before the release of the documentary the AP released the results of its own investigation, concluding it sees no reason to change the credit.

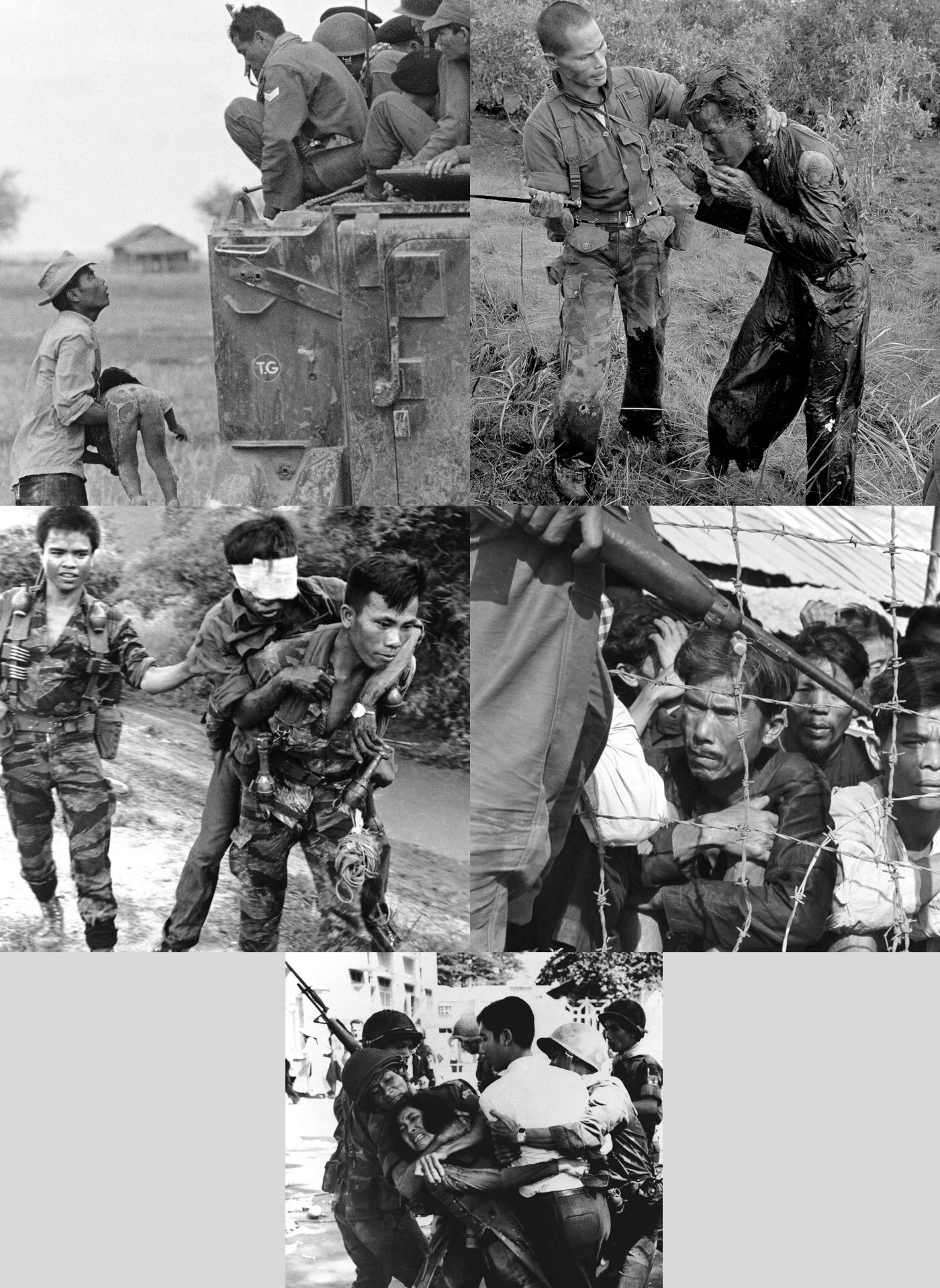
Selected images from Faas's 1965 Pulitzer Prize portfolio of Vietnam War photography

== Awards ==
- 1965: Pulitzer Prize (Photography): "For his combat photography of the war in South Viet Nam during 1964."
- 1964: Robert Capa Gold Medal for his "Coverage of Vietnam"
- 1972: Pulitzer-Prize (Spot News Photography) together with Michel Laurent: "For their picture series, 'Death in Dacca.'"
- 1997: Robert Capa Gold Medal together with Tim Page: "Requiem: By the Photographers Who Died in Vietnam and Indochina"
- 2005: Dr. Erich Salomon Prize of the German Society of Photography for his lifetime achievement
