= The Greatest Night in Pop =

- Film poster
- Directed by: Bao Nguyen
- Starring: Lionel Richie; Michael Jackson; Stevie Wonder; Diana Ross; Tina Turner; Bruce Springsteen; Huey Lewis; Cyndi Lauper; Sheila E.; Dionne Warwick
- Cinematography: Caleb Heller
- Production companies: Republic Pictures; Dorothy Street Pictures; MRC; MakeMake Entertainment
- Distributed by: Netflix
- Release date: January 29, 2024
- Running time: 96 minutes
- Countries: United States; United Kingdom
- Language: English

The Greatest Night in Pop is a 2024 documentary film directed by Bao Nguyen. The film is about the creation of the renowned pop song "We Are the World" and its recording in 1985. The film features interviews with various people involved in the song, including Lionel Richie, Michael Jackson, Stevie Wonder, Bruce Springsteen, Huey Lewis, Dionne Warwick, and Cyndi Lauper.

== Release and distribution ==
The world premiere of The Greatest Night in Pop took place on January 19, 2024, at the Sundance Film Festival as part of the Special Screenings. On January 29, 2024, Netflix released the film on its service.

== Reception ==
On the review aggregator website Rotten Tomatoes, 98% of 49 critics' reviews are positive, with an average rating of 7.7/10. The website's consensus reads: "A briskly paced celebration of a one-of-a-kind musical moment, The Greatest Night in Pop uncovers new stories while reminding viewers of the humanitarian vision that made it all happen." Metacritic, which uses a weighted average, assigned the film a score of 69 out of 100, based on 10 critics, indicating "generally favorable" reviews.

Richard Roeper of the Chicago Sun-Times gave the film three out of four stars and wrote, "Looking back all these years later, it's something of a miracle that, in the days before texts and emails, when you had to communicate by fax and messenger and landline phone calls, so many performers who were used to being the biggest star in the room agreed to get together on relatively short notice and figure out a path to record one of the most impactful singles in music history." Brian Tallerico of RogerEbert.com also gave the film three out of four stars and wrote, "Music bio-docs may be running out of steam, but The Greatest Night in Pop works by being specific and enlightening."

=== Accolades ===
Award	Date	Category	Recipient	Result	Ref.
Primetime Creative Arts Emmy Awards	September 7, 2024	Outstanding Documentary or Nonfiction Special	Amit Dey, Larry Klein, Harriet Sternberg, Lionel Richie, Bruce Eskowitz, George Hencken & Julia Nottingham	Nominated	
Primetime Creative Arts Emmy Awards	September 7, 2024	Outstanding Directing for a Documentary/Nonfiction Program	Bao Nguyen	Nominated	
Primetime Creative Arts Emmy Awards	September 7, 2024	Outstanding Sound Editing for a Nonfiction or Reality Program	Richard Gallagher	Nominated	
Critics' Choice Documentary Awards	November 10, 2024	Best Documentary Feature	The Greatest Night in Pop	Nominated	
Critics' Choice Documentary Awards	November 10, 2024	Best Archival Documentary	The Greatest Night in Pop	Nominated	
Critics' Choice Documentary Awards	November 10, 2024	Best Historical Documentary	The Greatest Night in Pop	Won	
Critics' Choice Documentary Awards	November 10, 2024	Best Music Documentary	The Greatest Night in Pop	Nominated	
Hollywood Music in Media Awards	November 20, 2024	Music Documentary – Special Program	Bao Nguyen, Julia Nottingham, George Hencken, Bruce Eskowitz, Lionel Richie, Harriet Sternberg & Larry Klein	Nominated	
Cinema Eye Honors	January 9, 2025	Outstanding Broadcast Editing	Nic Zimmerman, Will Znidaric and David Brodie	Nominated	
Grammy Awards	February 2, 2025	Best Music Film	Bao Nguyen, Bruce Eskowitz, George Hencken, Larry Klein, Julia Nottingham, Lionel Richie and Harriet Sternberg	Nominated	
Golden Reel Awards	February 23, 2025	Outstanding Achievement in Music Editing – Documentary	Gavin Allingham	Nominated	
