= BTS: The Return =

2026 documentary film by Bao Nguyen

- Film poster
- Directed by: Bao Nguyen
- Produced by: Bao Nguyen; Jane Cha Cutler; R. J. Cutler; Namjo Kim; Choongeon Lee; Se Jun Lee; Elise Pearlstein; Trevor Smith
- Cinematography: Bao Nguyen; Gwon Chourl; Caleb Heller
- Edited by: Stacy Kim; Susan E. Kim; Yeong-a Kim; Jean Rheem; Eugene Yi
- Production companies: Hybe; This Machine
- Distributed by: Netflix
- Release date: March 27, 2026
- Running time: 93 minutes
- Countries: South Korea; United States
- Languages: Korean; English

BTS: The Return is a 2026 documentary film directed by Bao Nguyen, featuring South Korean boy band BTS. The film is co-produced by Hybe and This Machine, and distributed by Netflix, and revolves around the group's return from military enlistment and their return to music. The documentary was released on Netflix on March 27, 2026.

== Synopsis ==
After completing South Korea's mandatory military service, BTS reunites in Los Angeles to record their fifth album, Arirang, as well as prepare for their comeback performance at Gwanghwamun Square in Seoul. The documentary underscores the group's individual struggles and collaborative efforts to rediscover their identity as a group after pursuing solo projects during their hiatus.

== Release ==
On March 7, Billboard announced several release dates from BTS to accompany the release of Arirang, which was March 20, 2026, stating: "A concert film titled The Comeback Live is scheduled to debut on March 21, offering fans a performance-focused companion to the new era. A documentary, The Return, will follow shortly after, with the film set to begin streaming on Netflix on March 27."

The trailer for BTS: The Return was released on March 16, 2026. A week after Arirang released, and nearly a week after the group's comeback concert, titled BTS The Comeback Live | Arirang, exclusively streamed on Netflix, the documentary was released on Netflix as scheduled, on March 27, 2026.

== Reception ==
On the review aggregator website Rotten Tomatoes, 100% of 14 critics' reviews are positive.

Brandon Yu of The New York Times states that the documentary "in short, as polished as you would expect of a work about a pop behemoth, a companion piece to their new album that’s less a revelatory look at the meaning of their time away than a sentimental welcome back for the group and its fans. For the BTS Army, that’s likely more than enough."

Writing for NME, Rhian Daly says, "Through it all, the overwhelming sense BTS: The Return gives is one of a group at a crossroads, figuring out which way to turn." Daly then says, "Whatever your conclusion, watching the journey to this point is thoroughly intriguing." Mashable's Crystal Bell concludes, "[Bao] Nguyen doesn't underline the point. He doesn't need to. It's already embedded in the film's pulse, in what it lingers on, in what it refuses to resolve." She then states that "the time they spent together was never just a means to an end. It was the thing they were trying to hold onto."
