= Huynh Thanh My =

Vietnamese photographer (1938–1965)

Huỳnh Thanh Mỹ
- Born: March 29, 1938; Long An, French Indochina
- Died: October 10, 1965 (aged 27); South Vietnam
- Cause of death: Killed in action
- Occupation: Photojournalism
- Children: 1
- Relatives: Nick Ut (brother)

Huỳnh Thanh Mỹ (March 29, 1938 – October 10, 1965) was a Vietnamese photographer working for the Associated Press. While covering a fight between the Viet Cong and ARVN Rangers in the Mekong Delta, Huynh Thanh My was wounded in the chest and arm. He was shot again while awaiting medical evacuation for his wounds when the Viet Cong overran the makeshift aid station of a South Vietnamese army position. Huynh left behind his 19-year-old widow and seven-month-old daughter. Later his wife and the then-10-year-old daughter were evacuated to Los Angeles when the war ended.

Huỳnh Thanh Mỹ was the older brother of photojournalist Nick Ut.
