= Adam Neuhaus =

American producer and entertainment executive

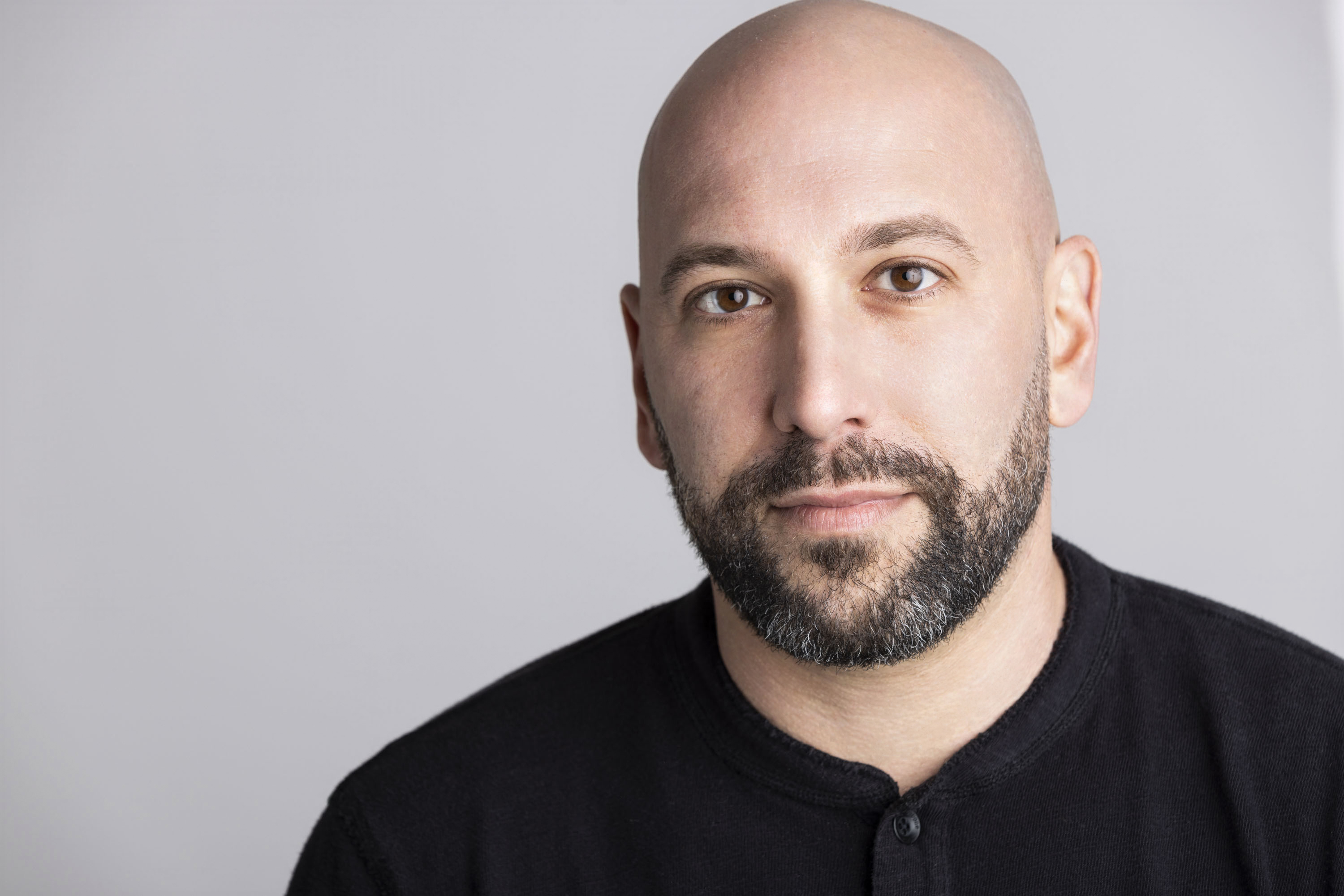
- Adam Neuhaus
- Occupations: Producer, executive

Adam Neuhaus is an American producer and entertainment executive noted for producing non-fiction television programming. He is Senior Director of Development for ESPN Films, leading creative development for the 30 for 30 documentary series, including feature documentaries, shorts, and podcasts. Neuhaus helped create 30 for 30 Podcasts, which launched in 2017.

He is the founder of Neuhaus Ideas, an ideas company serving the media industry, and the founder of NYC-based media networking group Headsets & Highballs. He has been an active member on the board of directors and advisory board for the Ghetto Film School, a Bronx-based nonprofit organization that teaches high school students about film-making.

Neuhaus's notable producer credits include Sterling Affairs, Be Water, Once Upon A Time in Queens, 144, and Lance of the 30 for 30 franchise, as well as the video game 1979 Revolution: Black Friday.

His past positions include senior director of development, media and entertainment at Radical Media, director of development at Original Media LLC, and roles in the motion picture literary departments of the Paradigm Talent Agency and William Morris Agency.

In 2025, Neuhaus founded the Nonfiction Hotlist, which he describes as “a curated slate of exceptional unproduced projects”. After sharing a post on LinkedIn about the challenging landscape of pitching documentary projects, Neuhaus organized a team of industry members including producers and network executives to curate and publish the first iteration of the Nonfiction Hotlist on March 7, 2025, selecting 23 entries from over 600 submissions. Neuhaus stated that one of his goals for the list, for which he cited The Black List as inspiration, is to “reverse the power dynamics for creators” by supporting and ideally generating buyer interest for quality non-fiction projects that might otherwise struggle to find financing. In January 2026, Yahoo Media Group announced a partnership with The Nonfiction Hotlist, who will curate 20 documentaries for Yahoo to promote and distribute across its properties. According to Neuhaus, the aim of the partnership is to develop “sustainable models where exceptional nonfiction finds its audience”, as well as provide “meaningful compensation” to filmmakers.
