= Rashid Talukder =

Bangladeshi photojournalist

- রশীদ তালুকদার
- Born: 24 October 1939; Baj Baj, Pargana, Bengal Presidency, British India
- Died: 25 October 2011 (aged 72); Dhaka, Bangladesh
- Resting place: Azimpur Graveyard, Dhaka
- Occupation: Photojournalist
- Employer: The Daily Ittefaq
- Organization: founder of the Bangladesh Photo Journalists' Association
- Known for: photographs of Bangladesh Liberation War of 1971
- Children: 3

Rashid Talukder (24 October 1939 – 25 October 2011) was a Bangladeshi photojournalist for The Daily Ittefaq, most known for capturing some of the defining images of the genocide during the Bangladesh Liberation War of 1971.

Talukder was a founder of the Bangladesh Photo Journalists' Association. He was awarded the Lifetime Achievement Award at the Chobi Mela, an international photography festival in Dhaka, in 2006, and the 2010 the 'Pioneer Photographer Award' given by National Geographic magazine.

== Early life and education ==
Born 24 October 1939 in Baj Baj, near Calcutta (now Kolkata) in Pargana (now 24 Parganas), Bengal Presidency, British India (now in West Bengal, India). He developed an interest in photography while still at school, and by the time he reached class 8 in 1945, he started working in the darkroom.

== Career ==
Talukdar started his career in 1962, as a press photographer with The Sangbad in Dhaka in the then East Pakistan. After working for a few years, he joined The Daily Ittefaq, where he worked for 29 years as a photojournalist and during his career he most notably shot the Bangladesh Liberation War of 1971 against Pakistan and the photograph of Sheikh Mujibur Rahman delivering his historic speech on 7 March 1971. As he feared for his safety, many of his photographs were not published until 1993 when he was approached by The Daily Star. Few photographers were able to film and publish an account of the events. Outside of Bangladesh, Horst Faas and Michel Laurent of the Associated Press won a Pulitzer Prize for Spot News Photography in 1972, which appeared in a print as "Death in Dacca".

Talukdar was the founder of the Bangladesh Photo Journalists' Association, and also a member of advisory councils of photographic organisations like Bangladesh Photographic Society. In 2006, he was awarded the Lifetime Achievement Award for contributions of photography at the Chobi Mela, an international photography festival in Dhaka, and in 2010 he became the first Bangladeshi photographer to have won the prestigious "Pioneer Photographer Award", part of the "All Roads Photography Programme" of National Geographic.

== List of notable photographs ==
- A photograph of a speech given by Sheikh Mujibur Rahman on 7 March 1971.

== Personal life ==
Talukder had a son and two daughters. He died on 25 October 2011 at a Dhaka hospital, after a brief illness at the age of 72. He was buried next to his wife at the Azimpur graveyard in Dhaka.

== Exhibitions ==
- Bangladesh 1971, Side Gallery, Newcastle upon Tyne, UK, 2008
- Where Three Dreams Cross, Whitechapel Gallery, London, 2010
