= Be Water =

2020 American documentary film

- Film poster
- Directed by: Bao Nguyen
- Produced by: Julia Nottingham; Bao Nguyen; Gentry Kirby; Erin Leyden; Adam Neuhaus
- Cinematography: Caleb Heller
- Edited by: Graham Taylor
- Music by: Goh Nakamura; Ton That An
- Production company: Dorothy Street Pictures
- Release date: January 2020 (Sundance)
- Running time: 104 minutes
- Country: United States
- Languages: English; Chinese

Be Water is a 2020 documentary film directed by Bao Nguyen. It premiered at the 2020 Sundance Film Festival. The film is about martial artist Bruce Lee. It uses significant amounts of archival footage, focusing on Lee's two years in Hong Kong spent filming four feature films. It is part of ESPN's 30 for 30 documentary series and the film tackles racism in America. In a GQ interview, Nguyen talks about how this film represents protest and fits the zeitgeist, with many more Asian-American films being released as contemporaries.

As of February 19, 2021, the film is on Netflix. It won the Gold List Award in 2021.

== Reception ==
On Rotten Tomatoes, the film has an aggregate score of 93% based on 28 positive and 2 negative critic reviews. The website's consensus reads: "If Be Water's surface level approach doesn't quite match its subject's depth, it still serves as an appropriate introduction to the almighty Bruce Lee."

David Rooney of The Hollywood Reporter praised the film as it serves as a respectful response to Bruce Lee's "demeaning portrayal" in Quentin Tarantino's film Once Upon a Time in Hollywood, where he was reduced to "a white he-man joke". Rooney wrote, "The film's strengths are its stimulating archive-rich historical content and its thoughtful examination of the systemic racism that blocked Lee's path in Hollywood until he had proved himself a commercial powerhouse in Hong Kong."
