= 2030 (film) =

- Directed by: Nghiem-Minh Nguyen-Vo
- Written by: Nghiem-Minh Nguyen-Vo
- Produced by: Đặng Tâm Chánh; Nguyễn Thế Thanh; Nghiem-Minh Nguyen-Vo; Bao Nguyen
- Starring: Quynh Hoa; Quy Binh
- Cinematography: Bao Nguyen
- Edited by: Julie Béziau
- Music by: Inouk Demers
- Production company: Saigon Media
- Release date: 6 February 2014 (Berlin)
- Running time: 98 minutes
- Country: Vietnam
- Language: Vietnamese

2030 (Vietnamese: Nước, lit. 'water') is a 2014 Vietnamese science fiction romance drama film written and directed by Nghiem-Minh Nguyen-Vo. The film was selected as the opening night film in the Panorama section at the 64th Berlin International Film Festival in February 2014. It was awarded the Tribeca Sloan Filmmaker Award from the Tribeca Film Institute and the Alfred P. Sloan Foundation.

== Plot ==
In the year 2030, water levels have risen due to global climate change. Southern Vietnam is one of the regions worst affected by climate change, which causes as much as half the farmland to be swallowed by water. To subsist, people have to live on houseboats and rely solely on fishing with a depleting supply. Huge multinational conglomerates compete to build floating farms equipped with desalination and solar power plants floating along the coastline to produce the needed vegetables that have become highly priced commodities. A young woman is on a journey to find out the truth about the murder of her husband whom she suspects has been killed by the people of a floating farm. In the process, she discovers the secret of that floating farm; it employs genetic engineering technology to cultivate vegetables that can be grown using salt water thus can be produced much cheaper. This untested technology can have dangerous health consequences for the consumers that the farm wants to keep as a secret. It turns out that the chief scientist of the floating farm in question; the main suspect of her husband's death was her ex-lover. She ends up finding out different versions of the “truth” about her husband's death and has to make a dramatic decision without knowing the absolute truth.

== Cast ==
- Quỳnh Hoa as Sáo
- Quý Bình as Giang
- Thạch Kim Long as Thi
- Hoàng Trần Minh Đức as Thủy
- Hoàng Phi as Thành
