= Trảng Bàng (town) =

Coordinates: 11.033°N 106.367°E

- District-level town (Class-4)
- Trảng Bàng Town; Thị xã Trảng Bàng
- /0/queryThe property query is required; /0/idsThe property ids is required; /0Failed to match at least one schema; /0/titleThe property title is required; /0/serviceDoes not have a value in the enumeration ["page"]; /0Failed to match exactly one schema; /0/geometriesThe property geometries is required; /0/typeDoes not have a value in the enumeration ["GeometryCollection"]; /0/typeDoes not have a value in the enumeration ["MultiPolygon"]; /0/typeDoes not have a value in the enumeration ["Point"]; /0/typeDoes not have a value in the enumeration ["MultiPoint"]; /0/typeDoes not have a value in the enumeration ["LineString"]; /0/typeDoes not have a value in the enumeration ["MultiLineString"]; /0/typeDoes not have a value in the enumeration ["Polygon"]; /0/coordinatesThe property coordinates is required; /0/geometryThe property geometry is required; /0/typeDoes not have a value in the enumeration ["Feature"]; /0/featuresThe property features is required; /0/typeDoes not have a value in the enumeration ["FeatureCollection"]
- Country: Vietnam
- Region: Southeast
- Province: Tây Ninh
- Establishment: 1 February 2020
- Dissolution: 1 July 2025

Area
  - Total: 131 sq mi (338 km^{2})

Population (2018)
  - Total: 183,385
- Time zone: UTC+7 (UTC + 7)
- Website: trangbang.tayninh.gov.vn

Trảng Bàng was a town in Tây Ninh Province, in the Southeast region of Vietnam. It has a traditional artisan industry, and recently has opened an industrial zone for foreign investment. Trảng Bàng is best known for its regional delicacies: bánh canh Trảng Bàng, a kind of pork noodle soup and "Trảng Bàng dew-wetted rice paper" (Vietnamese: Bánh tráng phơi sương Trảng Bàng), served with boiled pork, local herbs and Vietnamese fish sauce.

Outside Vietnam it is most famous for the iconic and Pulitzer Prize-winning image The Terror of War, depicting a nude Phan Thi Kim Phuc (who had torn off her burning clothes to survive the attack) and other Vietnamese children fleeing an accidental napalm bombing by Republic of Vietnam airplanes on the village of Trảng Bàng alongside ARVN soldiers.

The town of Trảng Bàng dissolved on the 1st of July, 2026, as a result of the 2025 Vietnamese administrative reforms, which eliminated all district-level units excluding wards and communes. The areas once part of Trảng Bàng now consist of 4 districts: Trảng Bàng, An Tịnh, Gia Lộc — and 2 communes: Hưng Thuận, and Phước Chỉ.

== Geography ==
Trảng Bàng covers an area of 338 km^{2} (131 sq mi).

== Demographics ==
As of 2018, Trảng Bàng had a population of 183,385.
