= Nguyễn Võ Nghiêm Minh =

Vietnamese-American film director (born 1956)

Nguyễn Võ Nghiêm Minh (Vietnam, 1956), known as Minh Nguyen-Vo, is a Vietnamese-American film director.

His films include Mùa len trâu (English title: The Buffalo Boy), for which he won many international awards. He spent 16 years as a physicist at the University of California in Los Angeles before completing cinematography studies at the same institution in 1998.

His latest film, Nước (English title: 2030), a futuristic feature film set in 2030 Vietnam, was selected as the opening night film of the Panorama section of the 64th Berlin International Film Festival.

== Awards ==
- New Directors Silver Hugo Award, 40th Chicago International Film Festival (2004)
- Grand Prix, Amiens International Film Festival (2004)
- Best film, Asian Marine Film Festival (2005)
- Best film and nomination for best director, 50th Asia-Pacific Film Festival (2005)
- Best director, Cape Town Film Festival, (2005)
- Most outstanding film, Vietnamese Entrepreneurs' Cultural Centre (2005)
- Best foreign language film, Palm Springs International Film Festival (2006)
- Best director, 15th Vietnam Film Festival (2007)
