= 1973 Pulitzer Prize =

Awards for journalism and related fields

The following are the Pulitzer Prizes for 1973.

== Journalism awards ==
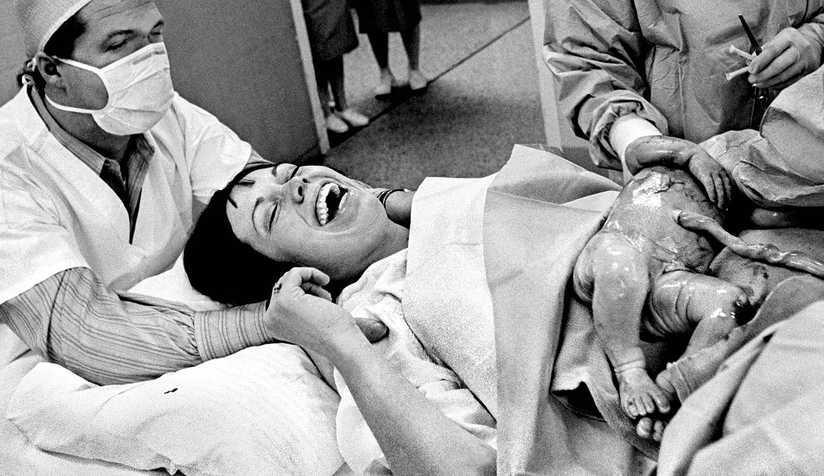
"Moment of Life", the exemplary image cited for the Feature Photography prize

"The Terror of War", the prize-winning Spot News photograph

- Public Service:
  - The Washington Post, for its investigation of the Watergate case.
- Local General or Spot News Reporting:
  - The Chicago Tribune, for uncovering flagrant violations of voting procedures in the primary election of March 21, 1972.
- Local Investigative Specialized Reporting:
  - The Sun Newspapers of Omaha, Nebraska, for uncovering the large financial resources of Boys Town, Nebraska, leading to reforms in this charitable organization's solicitation and use of funds contributed by the public.
- National Reporting:
  - Robert Boyd and Clark Hoyt of Knight Newspapers, for their disclosure of Senator Thomas Eagleton's history of psychiatric therapy, resulting in his withdrawal as the Democratic Vice Presidential nominee in 1972.
- International Reporting:
  - Max Frankel of The New York Times, for his coverage of President Nixon's visit to China in 1972.
- Commentary:
  - David S. Broder of The Washington Post, for his columns during 1972.
- Criticism:
  - Ronald Powers of the Chicago Sun-Times, for his critical writing about television during 1972.
- Editorial Writing:
  - Roger B. Linscott of The Berkshire Eagle (Pittsfield, Massachusetts), for his editorials during 1972.
- Editorial Cartooning:
  - No award given.
- Spot News Photography:
  - Huynh Cong Ut of the Associated Press, for his photograph, "The Terror of War", depicting children in flight from a napalm bombing.
- Feature Photography:
  - Brian Lanker of the Topeka Capital-Journal, for his sequence on child birth, as exemplified by his photograph, "Moment of Life".

== Letters, Drama and Music Awards ==
- Fiction:
  - The Optimist's Daughter by Eudora Welty (Random)
- Drama:
  - That Championship Season by Jason Miller (Atheneum)
- History:
  - People of Paradox: An Inquiry Concerning the Origins of American Civilization by Michael Kammen (Knopf)
- Biography or Autobiography:
  - Luce and His Empire by W.A. Swanberg (Scribner)
- Poetry:
  - Up Country by Maxine Kumin (Harper)
- General Nonfiction:
  - Fire in the Lake: The Vietnamese and the Americans in Vietnam by Frances FitzGerald (Little)
- General Nonfiction:
  - Children of Crisis, Vols. II and III by Robert Coles (Little)
- Music:
  - String Quartet No. 3 by Elliott Carter (Associated Music Publishers)
    premiered by the Juilliard String Quartet at Tully Hall, Lincoln Center, New York City, on January 23, 1973.

== Special Citations and Awards ==
- Letters:
  - James Thomas Flexner, a special citation to George Washington, Vols. I-IV, by James Thomas Flexner.
