= Gò Dầu district =

Coordinates: 11.117°N 106.050°E

Gò Dầu district Huyện Gò Dầu
- District
- Interactive map of Gò Dầu district
- Country: Vietnam
- Region: Southeast
- Province: Tây Ninh
- Capital: Gò Dầu

Area
  - Total: 97 sq mi (251 km^{2})

Population (2018)
  - Total: 140,661
- Time zone: UTC+7 (UTC + 7)

Gò Dầu is a former rural district in the south of Tây Ninh province, Southeast region, Vietnam. In 2003, the district had a population of 140,661. The district covers an area of 251 km^{2} (97 sq mi) and its capital is the town of Gò Dầu.
