= Phan Thi Kim Phuc =

Vietnamese-Canadian activist; subject of a famous 1972 Vietnam War photo (born 1963)

Phan Thị Kim Phúc OOnt
- The Terror of War, June 8, 1972: Kim Phúc, centre, running down a road naked near Trảng Bàng after a South Vietnam Air Force napalm attack
- Born: Phan Thị Kim Phúc; April 6, 1963 (age 63); Trảng Bàng, South Vietnam
- Other name: Kim Phúc
- Citizenship: South Vietnam (1963–1975); Vietnam (1975–1997); Canada (1997–present)
- Education: University of Havana, Cuba
- Occupations: author, UNESCO Goodwill Ambassador
- Known for: being "The Girl in the Picture" (Vietnam War)
- Spouse: Bui Huy Toan (m. 1992)
- Children: 2
- Awards: Order of Ontario

Phan Thị Kim Phúc OOnt (Vietnamese: [faːŋ tʰɪ̂ˀ kim fúk͡p̚]; born April 6, 1963), referred to informally as the girl in the picture and the napalm girl, is a South Vietnamese-born Canadian woman best known as the child depicted in the Pulitzer Prize–winning photograph, titled The Terror of War, taken at Trảng Bàng during the Vietnam War on June 8, 1972.

The image shows a nine-year-old Kim Phuc running naked on a road after being severely burned on her back by a South Vietnamese Air Force napalm attack. The image became one of the most iconic and powerful symbols of the war, influencing global public opinion and anti-war movements.

After years of medical treatment for her injuries, Kim Phúc eventually moved to Canada, where she became a citizen and later founded the Kim Foundation International, a nonprofit organization dedicated to helping child victims of war. She has since become a UNESCO Goodwill Ambassador and a prominent advocate for peace and reconciliation, frequently sharing her experiences to promote healing and understanding.

Her story has been widely documented in books, interviews, and documentaries, highlighting her journey from war victim to humanitarian. Despite enduring lifelong physical and emotional scars, Kim Phúc continues to use her platform to support survivors of conflict and raise awareness about the humanitarian impact of war.

== Vietnam War napalm attack ==
Phan Thi Kim Phúc and her family lived in Trảng Bàng in South Vietnam. On June 8, 1972, South Vietnamese planes dropped napalm on Trảng Bàng, which had been attacked and occupied by North Vietnamese forces. Kim Phúc joined a group of civilians and South Vietnamese soldiers who were fleeing from the Caodai Temple to the safety of South Vietnamese-held positions. The Republic of Vietnam Air Force pilot flying an A-1E Skyraider mistook the group for enemy soldiers and diverted to attack. The bombing killed two of Kim Phúc's cousins and two other villagers. Kim Phúc received third degree burns after her clothing was burned by the fire.

=== Images and rescue ===
Photographer Nick Ut sold the Associated Press (AP) a photograph of Kim Phúc running naked amid other fleeing villagers, South Vietnamese soldiers, and other press photographers. Ut was attributed as the photographer, but this has been contested since the release of The Stringer in 2025. In an interview many years later, Kim Phúc recalled she was yelling, Nóng quá, nóng quá ("So hot, so hot") in the picture. The New York Times editors were at first hesitant to consider the photo for publication because of the nudity, but they eventually approved it. A cropped version of the photo—with the press photographers to the right removed—was featured on the front page of The New York Times the next day. Titled "The Terror of War", it later earned a Pulitzer Prize and was chosen as the World Press Photo of the Year for 1973. In June 2025 World Press Photo rescinded their attribution of the photo to Nick Ut.

Ut took Kim Phúc and the other injured children to Barsky Hospital in Saigon, where it was determined that her burns were so severe that she probably would not survive. However, after a 14-month hospital stay and 17 surgical procedures, including skin grafts, she was able to return home. A number of the early operations were performed by Finnish plastic surgeon Aarne Rintala. It was only after treatment at a special hospital in Ludwigshafen, West Germany, in 1982, that Kim Phúc was able to properly move again. Ut continued to visit Kim Phúc until he was evacuated to the United States during the fall of Saigon.

Thumbnails of the film footage showing the events just before and after the photograph was taken

Less publicized is the film, shot by British television cameraman Alan Downes for the British Independent Television News (ITN) and his Vietnamese counterpart Le Phuc Dinh, who was working for the American television network NBC, which shows the events just before and after the photograph was taken. In the top-left frame, a man stands and appears to take photographs as a passing airplane drops bombs. A group of children, Kim Phúc among them, run away in fear. After a few seconds, she encounters the reporters dressed in military fatigues, including Christopher Wain (top-right frame), who gave her water and poured some over her burns. As she turns sideways, the severity of the burns on her arm and back can be seen (bottom-left frame). A crying woman, Kim Phúc's grandmother, Tao, runs in the opposite direction holding her badly burned grandchild, 3-year-old Danh, Kim Phúc's cousin, who died of his injuries (bottom-right frame). Sections of the film shot were included in Hearts and Minds (1974), the Academy Award-winning documentary about the Vietnam War directed by Peter Davis.

== Adult life ==
In 1982, Kim Phúc was removed from her university as a young adult studying medicine and used as a propaganda symbol by the communist government of Vietnam. Due to constant pain, she considered suicide, but later that year she found a New Testament in a library that led her to become a Christian and embrace forgiveness. In 1986, she was granted permission to continue her studies in Cuba, where she learned Spanish and was trained as a pharmacist. Kim Phúc met Ut for the first time in fourteen years in Havana in 1989, and the two have been meeting and speaking over telephone regularly ever since. Prime Minister of Vietnam Phạm Văn Đồng became her friend and patron. After arriving in Cuba, she met Bui Huy Toan, another Vietnamese student, whom she married in 1992.

In 1993, on the way to their honeymoon in Moscow, they left the plane during a refuelling stop in Gander, Newfoundland, and asked for political asylum in Canada, which was granted. The couple now live in Ajax, Ontario, and have two children. In 1996, Kim Phúc met the surgeons who had saved her life. The following year she became a Canadian citizen.

In 2015, it was reported that she was receiving laser treatment, provided free of charge at a hospital in Miami, US, to reduce the scarring on her left arm and back.

=== Activism ===
Forgiveness made me free from hatred. I still have many scars on my body and severe pain most days but my heart is cleansed. Napalm is very powerful, but faith, forgiveness, and love are much more powerful. We would not have war at all if everyone could learn how to live with true love, hope, and forgiveness. If that little girl in the picture can do it, ask yourself: Can you?

— Kim Phúc, NPR in 2008

In 1997, she established the first Kim Phúc Foundation in the U.S., with the aim of providing medical and psychological assistance to child victims of war. Later, other foundations were set up, with the same name, under an umbrella organization, Kim Phúc Foundation International.

In 2004, Kim Phúc spoke at the University of Connecticut about her life and experience, learning how to be "strong in the face of pain" and how compassion and love helped her heal.

On December 28, 2009, National Public Radio broadcast her spoken essay, "The Long Road to Forgiveness", for the This I Believe series. In May 2010, Kim Phúc was reunited by the BBC with ITN correspondent Christopher Wain, who helped to save her life. On May 18, 2010, Kim Phúc appeared on the BBC Radio 4 programme It's My Story. In the programme, Kim Phúc related how she was involved through her foundation in the efforts to secure medical treatment in Canada for Ali Abbas, who had lost both arms in a rocket attack on Baghdad during the invasion of Iraq in 2003.

In a December 21, 2017, article for The Wall Street Journal, Kim Phúc wrote that the physical trauma she suffered in the napalm strike still required treatment, but that "even worse than the physical pain was the emotional and spiritual pain." This led directly to her conversion to Christianity, which she credits with healing the psychological trauma of living over forty years being known to the world as "Napalm Girl". "My faith in Jesus Christ is what has enabled me to forgive those who had wronged me," she wrote, "no matter how severe those wrongs were."

In July 2022, Kim Phúc in person welcomed 236 Ukrainian refugees with children aboard a special flight, arranged by an organization called Solidaire, from Warsaw to Regina, Saskatchewan, Canada, in an airplane displaying her iconic 1972 photo on its side.

== Recognition ==
On November 10, 1994, Kim Phúc was named a UNESCO Goodwill Ambassador. In 1996, Kim Phúc gave a speech at the United States Vietnam Veterans Memorial on Veterans Day. In her speech, she said that one cannot change the past, but everyone can work together for a peaceful future. John Plummer, a pastor and Vietnam veteran who said he took part in coordinating the air strike with the Republic of Vietnam Air Force, met with Kim Phúc briefly and was publicly forgiven. Plummer later admitted he had lied about his supposed role in the bombing, saying he was "caught up in the emotion at the Vietnam Veterans Memorial on the day Phuc spoke". Canadian filmmaker Shelley Saywell made a documentary about their meeting.

Her biography, The Girl in the Picture, was written by Denise Chong and published in 1999.

In 2003, Belgian composer Eric Geurts wrote the song "The Girl in the Picture", dedicated to Kim Phúc. It was released on Flying Snowman Records, with all profits going to the Kim Phúc Foundation, and re-released in 2021 as part of Eric's album Leave a Mark.

=== Awards ===
On October 22, 2004, Kim Phúc was made a member of the Order of Ontario, and received an honorary Doctorate of Law from York University for her work supporting child victims of war around the world. On October 27, 2005, she was awarded an honorary degree in law from Queen's University in Kingston, Ontario. On June 2, 2011, she was awarded the honorary degree of Doctor of Laws from the University of Lethbridge. On May 19, 2016, she was awarded a Doctor of Civil Law, Honoris Causa by Saint Mary's University (Halifax).

On February 11, 2019, Kim Phúc was awarded the 2019 Dresden Peace Prize in recognition of her work with UNESCO and as an activist for peace.

== Retrospective works ==
The Girl in the Picture: The Kim Phúc Story, the Photograph and the Vietnam War, by Denise Chong, is a 1999 biographical and historical book tracing the life story of Kim Phúc. Chong's historical coverage emphasizes the life, especially the school and family life, of Kim Phúc from before the attack, through convalescence, and into the present time. The book deals primarily with Vietnamese and American relationships during the Vietnam War, while examining themes of war, racism, immigration, political turmoil, repression, poverty, and international relationships through the lens of family and particularly through the eyes and everyday lives of women. Kim Phúc and her mother, Nu, provide the lens through which readers of The Girl in the Picture experience war, strife, and the development of communism in Vietnam. Like Chong's first book, The Girl in the Picture was shortlisted for the Governor General's Award for English-language non-fiction.

== See also ==
- Execution of Nguyễn Văn Lém – 1968 photograph by Eddie Adams
- Thích Quảng Đức – Vietnamese Buddhist monk (1897–1963)
- List of photographs considered the most important
