= Củ Chi =

Củ Chi Xã Củ Chi Tân Phú Trung
- Commune
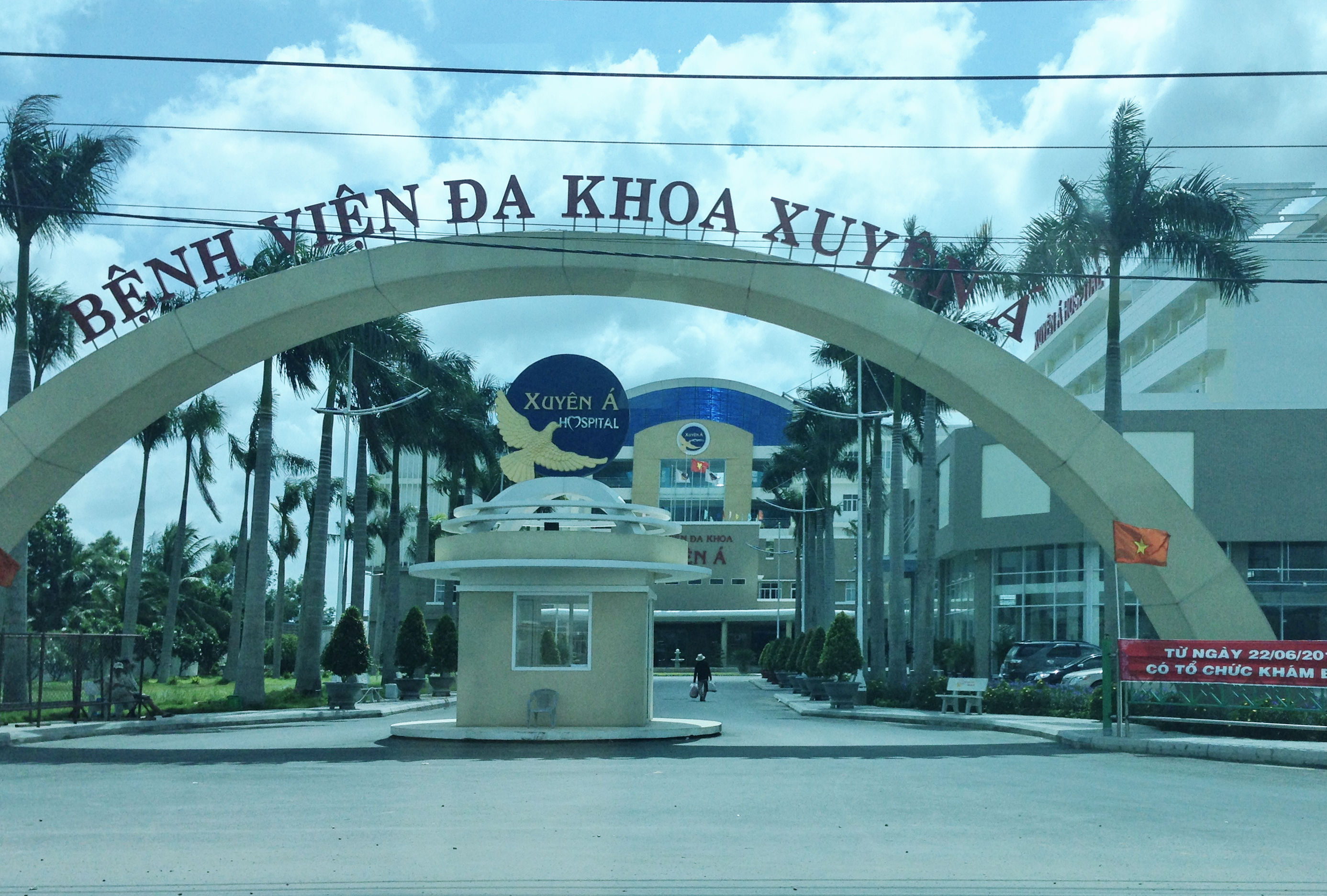
- Xuyên Á Hospital in Củ Chi
- Interactive map of Củ Chi
- Coordinates: 10°56′19″N 106°33′08″E
- Country: Vietnam
- Municipality: Ho Chi Minh City
- Established: June 16, 2025

Area
  - Total: 25.05 sq mi (64.88 km^{2})

Population (2024)
  - Total: 128,661
  - Density: 5,136/sq mi (1,983/km^{2})
- Time zone: UTC+07:00 (Indochina Time)
- Administrative code: 27553

Củ Chi (Vietnamese: Xã Củ Chi) is a commune of Ho Chi Minh City, Vietnam. It is one of the 168 new wards, communes and special zones of the city following the reorganization in 2025.

== History ==
On June 16, 2025, the National Assembly Standing Committee issued Resolution No. 1685/NQ-UBTVQH15 on the arrangement of commune-level administrative units of Ho Chi Minh City in 2025 (effective from June 16, 2025). Accordingly, the entire land area and population of Tân Phú Trung, Tân Thông Hội and Phước Vĩnh An communes of the former Củ Chi district will be integrated into a new commune named Củ Chi (Clause 123, Article 1).
