= Bến Cầu district =

Coordinates: 11.083°N 106.167°E

Bến Cầu District Huyện Bến Cầu
- District
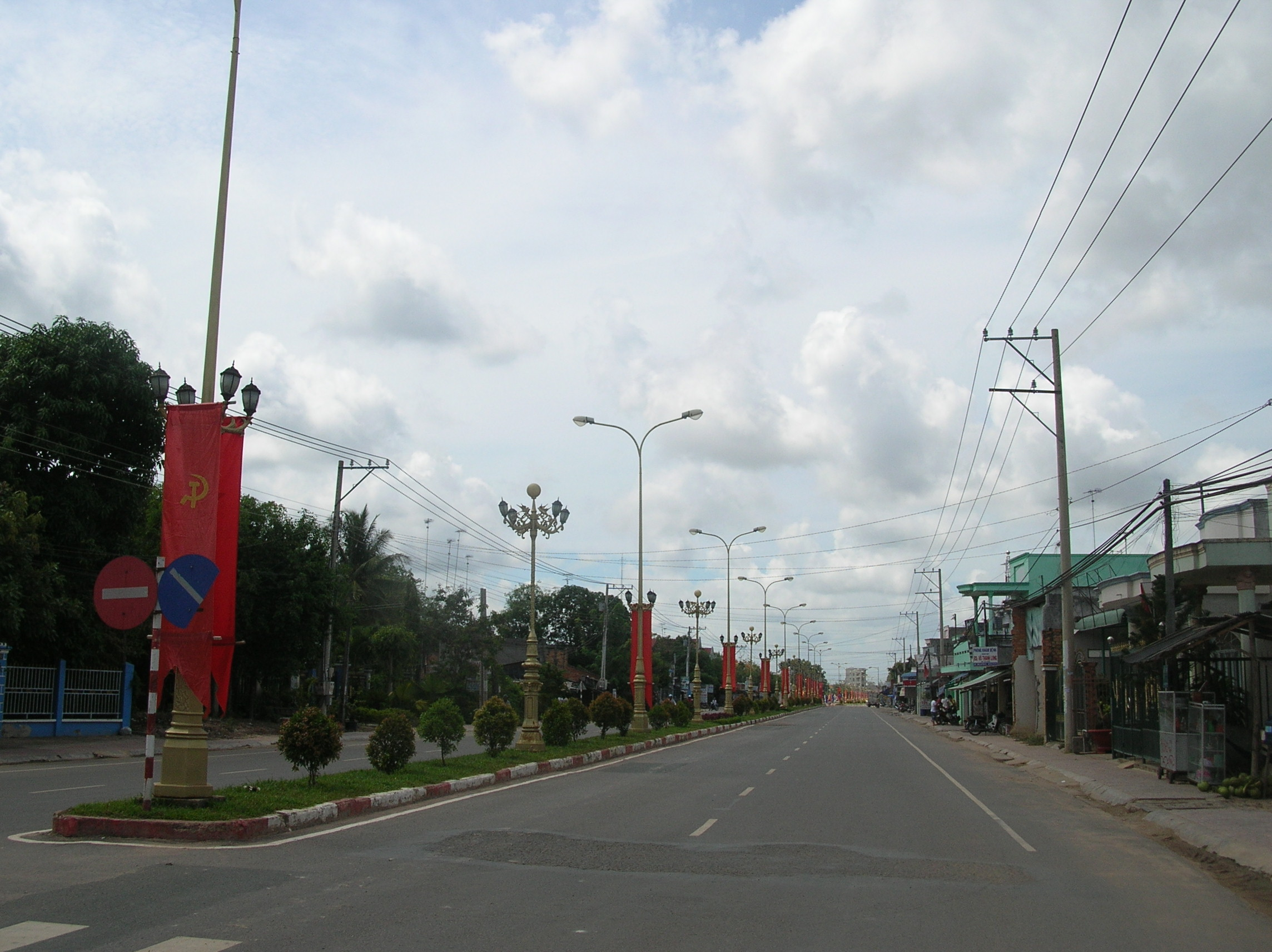
- Interactive map of Bến Cầu District
- Country: Vietnam
- Region: Southeast
- Province: Tây Ninh
- Capital: Bến Cầu

Area
  - Total: 88 sq mi (229 km^{2})

Population (2006)
  - Total: 62,664
- Time zone: UTC+07:00 (Indochina Time)

Bến Cầu is a former rural district of Tây Ninh province in the Southeast region of Vietnam. As of 2006, the district had a population of 62,664. The district covers an area of 229 km^{2}. The district capital lies at Bến Cầu.
