= Trảng Bàng =

- Ward
- Aerial view of Trảng Bàng ward
- Interactive map of Trảng Bàng
- Coordinates: 11.029728647844182°N 106.35885021665513°E
- Country: Vietnam
- Province: Tây Ninh
- Region: Southeast
- Established: 1 February 2020
- Seat: 1–3 Gia Long Street, Khu phố Lộc An

Area
  - Total: 36.97 km^{2} (14.27 sq mi)

Population (31 December 2024)
  - Total: 53,532
  - Density: 1,448/km^{2} (3,750/sq mi)
- Website: trangbang.tayninh.gov.vn

Trảng Bàng is a ward in Tây Ninh province, Vietnam.

On 16 June 2025, the Standing Committee of the National Assembly of Vietnam adopted Resolution No. 1682/NQ-UBTVQH15 on the reorganization of commune-level administrative units in Tây Ninh province in 2025. Under the resolution, the entire area and population of An Hòa ward and Trảng Bàng ward in the former Trảng Bàng town were consolidated to form a new ward named Trảng Bàng.
