= Gleb Garanich =

Ukrainian photographer (born 1969)

- Гліб Володимирович Гараніч
- Born: 1969 (age 56–57); Sakhalin, Russian SFSR, Soviet Union
- Other names: Hlib Volodymyrovych Haranich
- Occupation: Photojournalist
- Employer: Reuters
- Known for: War photography, World Press Photo award-winning photography of the Russo-Georgian War
- Awards: World Press Photo (2008, 3rd prize Spot News Singles)

Gleb Vladimirovich Garanich (Russian: Глеб Владимирович Гаранич, Hlib Volodymyrovych Haranich, Ukrainian: Гліб Володимирович Гараніч, born 1969) is a Ukrainian photographer.

Garanich was born in Sakhalin in Russia. He is based in Kyiv. Garanich is self-taught and was taking photographs since 1980.

In 2008, during the Russo-Georgian War, Garanich worked for Reuters. He was in Gori after the Russian army withdrew from the city it occupied for several days, and made photographs showing a man mourning his brother killed in the Russian bombing. In Russia, conspiracy theories that the photos were staged gained popularity, but both Garanich and Reuters denied that, and no proof was ever provided. One of the photographs eventually won the third prize in the Spot News Singles category of the 2008 World Press Photo of the Year photographic contest.

Garanich covered the Euromaidan in Kyiv in 2013. He was wounded but continued to take pictures. In 2015, still working for Reuters, Garanich was assigned to cover the Russo-Ukrainian war. In particular, he was working at the frontline and in Kramatorsk.

In 2022, his photo with the Commander-in-Chief of the Armed Forces of Ukraine Valerii Zaluzhnyi was featured on the cover of Time.
