= Antonio Faccilongo =

Italian photographer, filmmaker and educator (born 1979)

- Born: 1979 (age 46–47); Rome, Italy
- Occupations: Documentary photographer Filmmaker; University photography professor
- Notable work: Habibi
- Awards: 2021 World Press Photo Story of the Year
- Website: www.antoniofaccilongo.com

Antonio Faccilongo (born 1979) is an Italian documentary photographer, filmmaker, and educator. He is a professor of photography at Rome University of Fine Arts. Faccilongo won the World Press Photo Story of the Year in 2021.

== Career ==
Faccilongo started his career as news photographer at Il Messaggero, an Italian newspaper based in Rome. In 2008, he began to deal with stories of international interest and focused his attention on Asia and the Middle East, principally in Israel and Palestine, covering social, political and cultural issues.

Faccilongo developed his long-term photography series Habibi to cover the complicated contemporary conflicts of the Israeli–Palestinian conflict. According to Firstpost, the series "chronicles love stories set against the backdrop of one of the longest contemporary conflicts, the Israeli-Palestinian war. The story shows the impact of the conflict on Palestinian families and the difficulties they face in preserving their reproductive rights and human dignity." The Guardian writes, "Items left behind by inmates allow us to perceive the absence of men and to understand the emptiness they left in the life of their family members."

Habibi won both the World Press Photo Story of the Year from the World Press Photo Foundation and first prize in Long-term projects category. The work was mentioned in Verve magazine and published as a story at Vice. Habibi was selected to be published as a book by an international jury. The book is edited by Sarah Leen, designed by Ramon Pez and includes the poetry of Taha Muhammad Ali.

In 2016, for Vice he documented the illegal narcotics trade in Gaza, writing that his work "imposes a socio-anthropological lens to explore escapism and suffering in the face of social malaise."

Faccilongo's other long-term projects include Lose The Roots, and All For Love. His stories include "Atomic Rooms", "Fade Away", "Kaitseliit", "(Single) Women", "Wuchale", "Huaxi", and "I am Legend".

== Publications ==
- Faccilongo, Antonio (2020). Habibi. New York: FotoEvidence. ISBN 978-1-7324711-6-0. OCLC 1206454257.

== Films ==
- Digital Heroin – documentary
- My Brother is an Only Child – documentary
- The Chinese Dream – documentary
- Kaitseliit – documentary

== Awards ==
- 2011: 2nd prize, International Photography Awards in Political Category
- 2011: 1st prize, World Of Women
- 2011: 1st prize, Kuala Lumpur International PhotoAwards
- 2011: 1st prize, International Photography Awards in People
- 2011: 1st prize, Worldwide Photography Gala Awards
- 2011: 1st prize, Px3 in Feature Category
- 2015: Finalist, LensCulture Visual Storytelling Awards
- 2015: 1st prize, MIFA in Sport category
- 2016: Finalist, Fotoleggendo Premio Tabò
- 2016: Finalist, LensCulture Portrait Awards
- 2016: 3rd prize, Px3 in Feature Category
- 2016: 1st award, Umbria World Fest
- 2016: 1st award, LuganoPhotoDays
- 2016: Best Color Documentary work Gomma Grant
- 2017: Finalist, LensCulture Magnum Awards
- 2017: 2nd prize, PHMuseum Grant
- 2017: Getty Editorial Grant winner
- 2019: Winner, Pictures of the Year International (POYi) in World Understand Award category
- 2020: Winner, Photo District News in photojournalism category
- 2020: Fotoevidence Book Award with World Press Photo winner
- 2020: FotoEvidence Book Award with World Press Photo for Habibi
- 2021: World Press Photo Story of the Year from World Press Photo
- 2021: 1st prize in Long-Term Projects category at World Press Photo
- 2021: Feature Shoot winner
- 2021 Shortlist, Sony World Photography Awards (Lose the Roots)
- 2021: National Geographic Society's COVID-19 Emergency Fund
