= Finbarr O'Reilly =

Irish/Canadian independent photographer

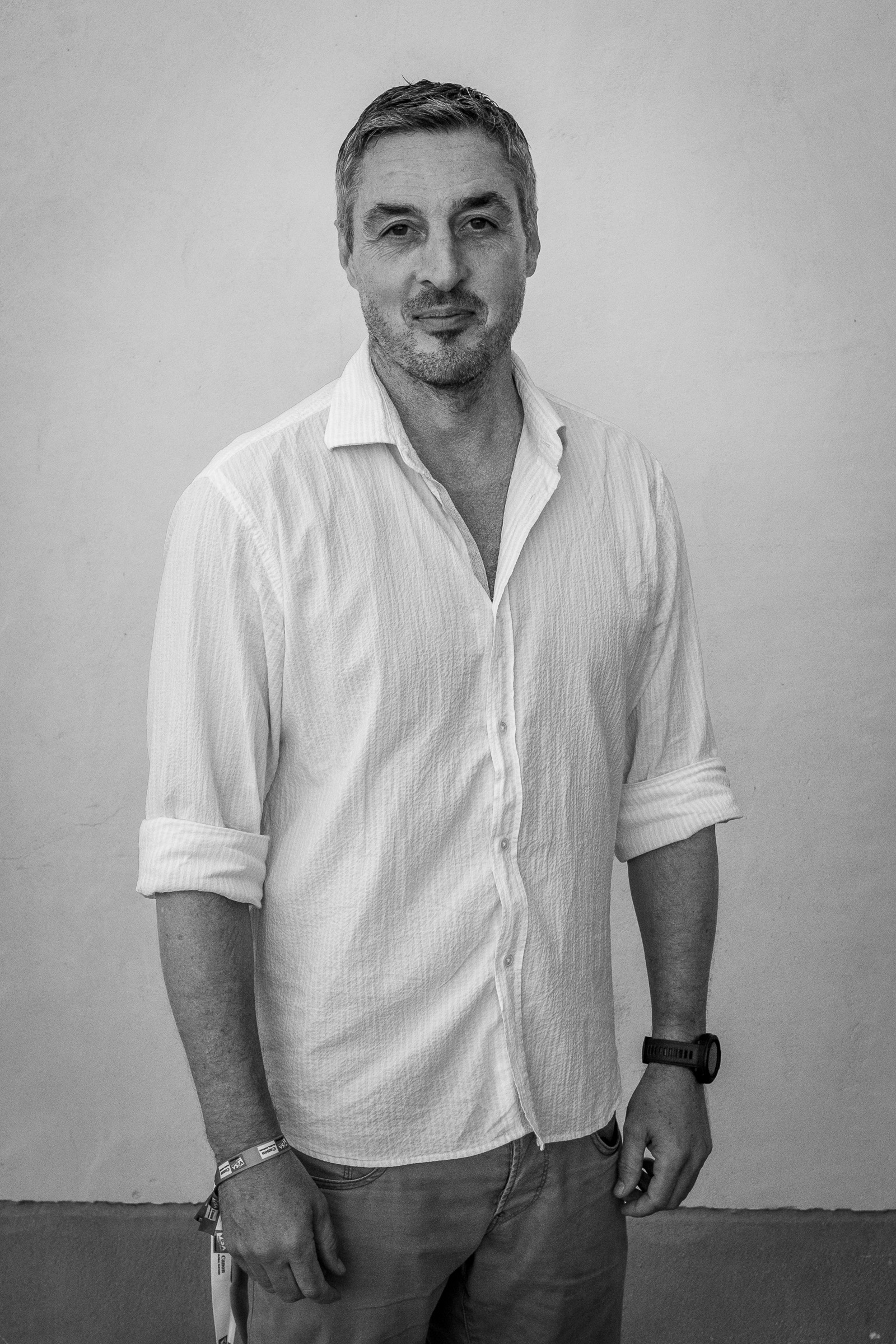
- Finbarr O'Reilly (2022)
- Born: 1971 (age 54–55); Swansea, United Kingdom
- Known for: Author and photographer
- Awards: World Press Photo of the Year 2005

Finbarr O'Reilly (born 1971) is a Welsh-born Irish/Canadian photographer. He is a regular contributor to The New York Times. O'Reilly won the 2019 World Press Photo First Place prize in the Portraits category, and also won the World Press Photo of the Year award in 2006. He is co-author of the joint memoir with U.S. Marine Sgt. Thomas James Brennan, Shooting Ghosts (2017).

== Early life and education ==
O'Reilly was born in Swansea in South Wales and raised in Dublin, Ireland until he moved with his family to Vancouver, British Columbia, Canada at the age of nine. He attended high school at Vancouver College.

== Life and work ==
After high school he became a Toronto-based arts correspondent for The Globe and Mail and then spent three years writing pop culture and entertainment pieces for the National Post.

He joined Reuters as a freelance correspondent based in Kinshasa, Congo in 2001 In 2003 he co-produced The Ghosts of Lomako, a documentary about conservation in the Democratic Republic of Congo. In the same year he co-directed the documentary, The Digital Divide about technology in the developing world.

From 2003 to 2005 he was the Reuters African Great Lakes correspondent in Kigali, Rwanda. He turned to photography in 2005 and from 2005 until 2012 was the Reuters Chief Photographer for West and Central Africa, based in Dakar, Senegal. In 2012 he took a sabbatical year off to study psychology as a Nieman Fellow at Harvard with a focus on conflict-induced trauma.

Upon returning to Reuters, he was posted to Tel Aviv as a Senior Photographer for Israel and the Palestinian Territories. He covered the 2014 Gaza War from inside the Strip before leaving Reuters in 2015.

O'Reilly is one of several journalists included in Under Fire: The Psychological Cost of Covering War, a documentary which won a 2013 Peabody Award. shortlisted for a 2012 Academy Award.

In 2014, he was an Ochberg Fellow at the DART Center for Journalism and Trauma at Columbia University's Graduate School of Journalism in New York, in 2015 a Yale World Fellows and in 2016 a MacDowell Colony Fellow and a writer in residence at the Carey Institute for Global Good.

Shooting Ghosts (2017) is a joint memoir with Sgt. Thomas James Brennan, a U.S. Marine who he had met during one of his assignments in Afghanistan. Their unlikely friendship helped heal them after war.

== Awards ==
- 2006: World Press Photo of the Year 2005 award of the annual World Press Photo contest. The color image shows the emaciated fingers of a one-year-old child pressed against the lips of his mother at an emergency feeding clinic in Niger.
- 2019: World Press Photo First Place prize in the Portraits category
- 2020: 11th Carmignac Photojournalism Award
