= John Moore (photographer) =

American photographer

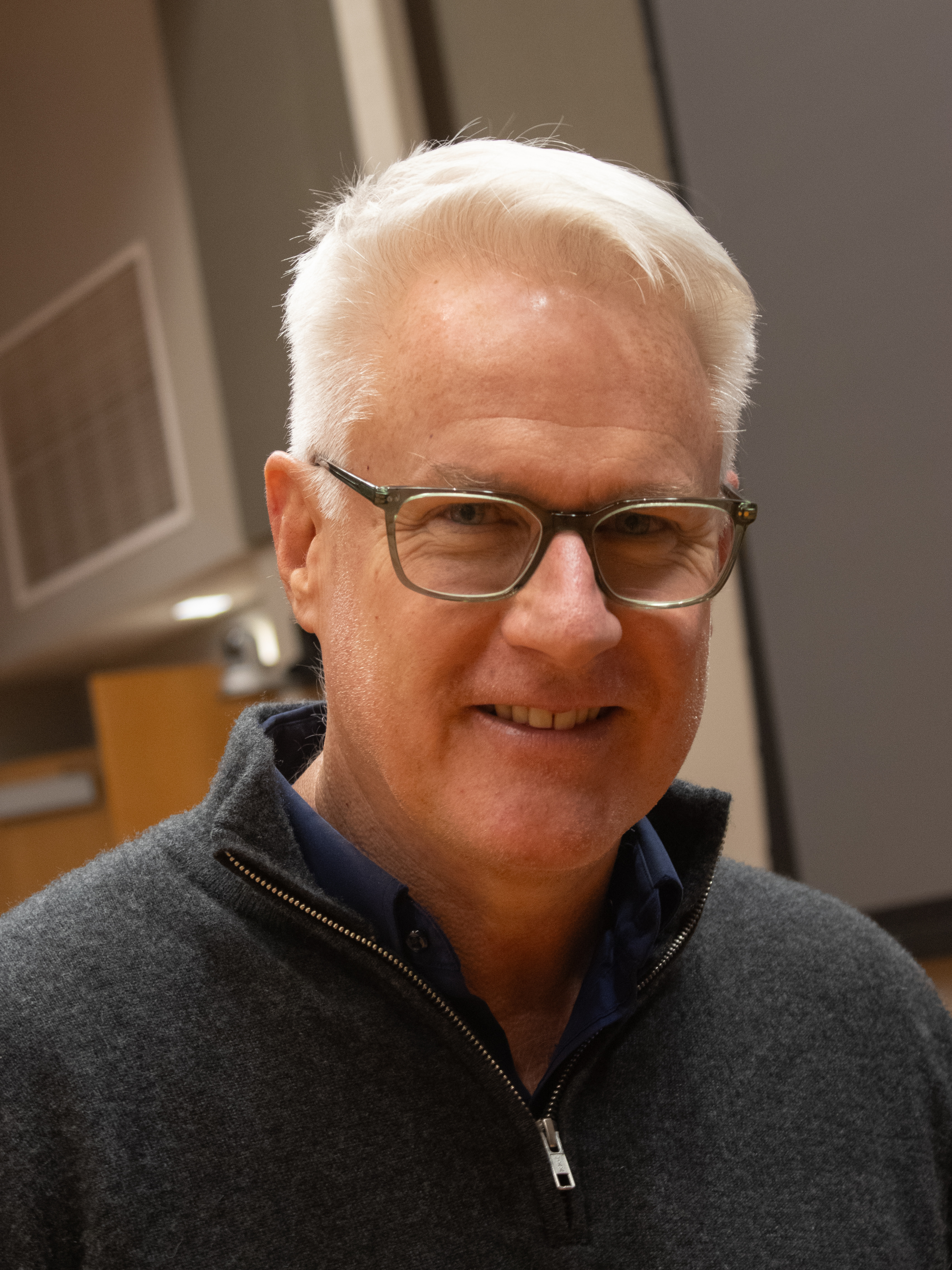
- Moore in 2025
- Education: University of Texas at Austin
- Website: https://www.instagram.com/jbmoorephoto/

John Moore (born 1967) is an American photographer. He works for Getty images among others. His work has received several awards, including a Pulitzer Prize in 2005. His photograph of a two-year-old girl, crying as US Border Patrol officers begin to search her mother prior to taking both of them into custody for illegally crossing the US-Mexican border, was named World Press Photo 2018.

== Life ==
John Moore studied at the University of Texas at Austin the study program Radio Television Film. Moore worked as a photographer in 70 countries, first in Nicaragua, then in India, South Africa, Mexico, Egypt and Pakistan. In 2008, he returned to the United States and focused his primary eye market on work on immigration and issues around the border. He lives with his family in Stamford, Connecticut.

== Awards ==

Moore won the Pulitzer Prize for Breaking News Photography in 2005, was honored at the World Press Photo and received the John Faber Award and the Robert Capa Gold Medal from Overseas Press Club, Photographer of the Year of Pictures of the Year International, the NPPA and Sony World Photography Organization.

On June 12, 2018, John Moore of Getty Images took a photograph of a Honduran child that would go viral as a depiction of Donald Trump's immigration policies. The photo was awarded the World Press Photo Award for 2018. His image shows "a different kind of violence that is psychological," explained the jury of the World Press Photo Award. The image depicts a two-year-old girl, crying as US Border Patrol officers begin to search her mother, Sandra Sanchez, an asylum seeker, prior to taking both of them into custody for illegally crossing the US-Mexican border near McAllen, Texas. Sanchez had been previously deported in July 2013.

Moore said that Border Patrol agents search people before taking them into custody. Prior to the search, the mother was told to put the child down. It was at this point that the child started crying, and Moore took a series of images, most of them shot at the approximate height of the child. In Moore's original caption for the photo, he wrote that they were "detained by U.S. Border Patrol agents before being sent to a processing center for possible separation."

The photo quickly went viral, appearing on Twitter, Facebook, and numerous media venues. The photograph was used as the lead image for a viral fundraiser for RAICES that raised more money than any other single donation campaign in Facebook's history. The toddler, was not separated from her mother after the two were taken into custody, although this fact was not widely known in the days immediately following publication of the image.

White House Press Secretary Sarah Huckabee Sanders posted on Twitter arguing Democrats and media were exploiting the photo to push an agenda, while Donald Trump Jr.'s tweet accused CNN of saying the child's father was lying.

== Time magazine cover ==
Time magazine cropped the photograph to create an illustration. Against a stark red background, the crying Yanela appears with President Trump towering over her. The headline, "Welcome to America", appears on the left in a small, traditional font.
