= Arko Datta =

Indian photojournalist

- Born: 4 February 1969 (age 57); Delhi, India
- Occupations: Photojournalist and Educator
- Awards: 2005 World Press Photo of the Year

Arko Datta (born 4 February 1969) is an Indian photojournalist. He won the 2005 World Press Photo of the Year.

== Life and work ==
Datta started his career with Indian Express in 1991, later working for The Telegraph, AFP and Reuters. He covered wars in Iraq and Afghanistan and other international events. His photograph of tsunami victims at Cuddalore, India drew responses from NGOs and charitable organisations worldwide.

He photographed the plight of victims of the 2002 Gujarat violence. One of his photos was seen as "the defining image of Gujarat carnage". The person captured in the picture, with folded hands begging for mercy, was forced to migrate first to Malegaon and then to Kolkata to avoid the press and sarcastic comments by society.

Datta's pictures have been published in The New York Times, The Washington Post, The Guardian, International Herald Tribune, and on the covers of Time, Newsweek, and The Economist.

Datta is the co-founder of Udaan School of Photography.

== Awards ==
- Winner, 2005 World Press Photo of the Year, World Press Photo, Amsterdam
- Pulitzer Prize nomination for Breaking News Photography in 2005
- Photographer of the year by Asian Photography magazine (twice) in 2003 and 2004
- Won 'Picture of the Year' and top prizes in four categories in 2004 in the Press Photo contest conducted by Mumbai Press Club
