= Paul Hansen =

Paul Hansen may refer to:

- Paul Hansen (basketball) (1928-1993), College basketball coach
- Paul Hansen (photographer) (born 1964), Swedish photographer
- Paul Hansen (tenor) (1886–1967), Danish opera singer and film actor
