= Burhan Ozbilici =

Turkish photojournalist

Burhan Özbilici is a Turkish photojournalist. In 2017, he won World Press Photo of the Year award for his image of the assassination of Andrei Karlov, the Russian Ambassador to Turkey.

== Life and work ==
Ozbilici grew up in Turkey. He joined Associated Press (AP) as a full-time photo stringer in 1989 and became a staff photographer in 1996.

== Awards ==
- 2017: Winner, World Press Photo of the Year, World Press Photo, Amsterdam for his image of the assassination of Andrei Karlov, the Russian Ambassador to Turkey.
- 2017: First prize, Spot News, Stories category, World Press Photo, Amsterdam

== See also ==
- The execution of Nguyễn Văn Lém by General Nguyễn Ngọc Loan, a photograph of which by AP photographer Eddie Adams won First Prize in the Spot News, Singles category of the 1968 World Press Photo contest, and the 1969 Pulitzer Prize for Spot News Photography
