= World Press Photo of the Year =

Dutch photography award

The World Press Photo of the Year award is part of the World Press Photo Awards, organized by the Dutch foundation World Press Photo.

Considered by many to be one of the most prestigious awards in photojournalism, the World Press Photo of the Year is awarded to "the single photograph that is not only the photojournalistic encapsulation of the year, but represents an issue, situation or event of great journalistic importance, and does so in a way that demonstrates an outstanding level of visual perception and creativity."

The jury, composed of 10 members, also assigns the World Press Photo Story of the Year to a multi-image story that explores a theme of social relevance distinguished by photographic intensity and importance of the content. The creators of the two main awards receive a cash prize corresponding to €5,000.

In addition to the two main prizes, 3 single photo prizes and 3 story prizes are also awarded in each of eight categories.

== List of Press Photos of the Year ==
The following is a list of all winners of the Press Photo of the Year, and information on the respective images.

Contest year	Photographer	Subject	Description	Web link
1955	(Denmark) Mogens von Haven	Motorcycle racing	On 28 August 1955, at Volk Mølle Racetrack in Assentoft, Denmark, a motorcyclist crashes during a competition.	Image
1956	(West Germany) Helmuth Pirath	Coming home from the war	A German World War II prisoner is released by the Soviet Union and reunited with his 12-year-old daughter in West Germany, who has not seen him since infancy.	Image
1957	(United States) Douglas Martin	Racial segregation in the United States	Accompanied by violence and harassment, Dorothy Counts becomes one of the first African American students at Harry P. Harding High School in Charlotte, North Carolina.	Image
1958	No award given.			
1959	(Czechoslovakia) Stanislav Tereba	Football	During a football game between the teams Sparta Praha and Červená Hviezda Bratislava, Sparta's goalkeeper Miroslav Čtvrtníček stands on the football field in pouring rain.	Image
1960	No award given.			
1961	(Japan) Yasushi Nagao	Assassination of Inejirō Asanuma	On 12 October 1960, the 17-year-old extreme right-wing student Otoya Yamaguchi kills the socialist politician Inejiro Asanuma with a sword during a speech in Tokyo's Hibiya Hall.	Image
1962	(Venezuela) Héctor Rondón Lovera	El Porteñazo uprising in Venezuela	During the El Porteñazo military rebellion, a dying soldier clings to a priest with sniper fire all around them.	Image
1963	(United States) Malcolm Browne	Suppression of Buddhists in Vietnam	The Vietnamese monk Thích Quảng Đức sets himself ablaze in protest against the persecution of Buddhists by the government of President Ngo Dinh Diem.	Image
1964	(United Kingdom) Don McCullin	Cyprus crisis of 1963–64	A Turkish woman mourns her dead husband, victim of the Greek–Turkish civil war.	Image
1965	(Japan) Kyōichi Sawada	Vietnam War	A mother and her children wade through a river in Loc Thuong in the South Vietnamese province of Binh Dinh to escape US bombing.	Image
1966	(Japan) Kyōichi Sawada	Vietnam War	On 24 February 1966, American troops drag the body of a Viet Cong fighter behind their M113 Armored Personnel Carrier for burial, after he was killed in a fierce night attack by several Viet Cong battalions against Australian forces during the Battle of Suoi Bong Trang.	Image
1967	(Netherlands) Co Rentmeester	Vietnam War	The gunner of an M48 Patton looks through his sight. This was the first color photograph to win the award.	Image
1968	(United States) Eddie Adams	Vietnam War	On 1 February 1968, the South Vietnamese police chief Nguyễn Ngọc Loan summarily executes Viet Cong prisoner Nguyễn Văn Lém on a street in Saigon with a bullet to the head.	Image
1969	(West Germany) Hanns-Jörg Anders	The Troubles	An Irish Catholic wearing a gas mask stands in front of a wall with the graffiti we want peace, moments before teargas is thrown by British troops.	Image
1970	No award given.			
1971	No award given.			
1972	(West Germany) Wolfgang Peter Geller	Bank robbery in Saarbrücken	After a bank robbery in Saarbrücken, a shootout takes place between police and the bank robbers.	Image
1973	Authorship disputed	Vietnam War	The young Phan Thị Kim Phúc and other children flee with severe burns caused by napalm, mistakenly dropped by South Vietnamese planes.	Image
1974	(Chile) Orlando Lagos	Coup in Chile	On 11 September 1973, president Salvador Allende appears shortly before his suicide in the presidential palace La Moneda during General Pinochet's military coup. Lagos's identity as the photographer was not revealed until February 2007, a month after his death.	Image
1975	(United States) Ovie Carter	Sahel famine, Niger	A small child suffers during a drought in Niger.	Image
1976	(United States) Stanley Forman	Fire Escape Collapse	During a fire in a Boston apartment building, the fire escape collapses and a woman falls down with her goddaughter. The woman died at the scene of impact.	Image
1977	(France) Françoise Demulder	Lebanese Civil War	In January 1976, a group of Palestinian refugees flees civil war in Beirut.	Image
1978	(South Africa) Leslie Hammond	Apartheid	The South African police tear-gas a group of demonstrators in Modderdam, near Cape Town.	Image
1979	(Japan) Sadayuki Mikami	Sanrizuka Struggle	After years of protests against the construction of Narita Airport, which is ready to open when on 26 March 1978 serious clashes break out between demonstrators and Riot Police Unit.	Image
1980	(United States) David Burnett	Fall of the Khmer Rouge in Cambodia	In November 1979, in a refugee camp in Sa Keo near the Thai–Cambodian border, a woman holds her child in her arms.	Image
1981	(United Kingdom) Mike Wells	Famine in Karamoja, Uganda	In April 1980, a white missionary in northeastern Uganda holds the comparatively tiny hand of a starving African boy.	Image
1982	(Spain) Manuel Pérez Barriopedro	23-F coup attempt in Madrid	On 23 February 1981 Lieutenant-Colonel Antonio Tejero speaks with a gun in his hand before the Spanish Congress of Deputies, holding hostage the government and MPs.	Image
1983	(United States) Robin Moyer	1982 Lebanon War	On 18 September 1982, Palestinian corpses lie in the street in the aftermath of the Sabra and Shatila massacre, when Phalangist Maronite Christian militias killed Palestinian refugees.	Image
1984	(Turkey) Mustafa Bozdemir	Earthquake in Turkey	On 30 October 1983, following a devastating earthquake in the vicinity of Erzurum and Kars, Zinnet Avcı finds her four children buried alive.	Image
1985	(India) Pablo Bartholomew	Bhopal disaster	The body of a child, killed in a chemical accident at the plant of US chemical company Union Carbide Corporation, is buried.	Image
1986	(France) Frank Fournier	Omayra Sánchez	Sánchez, a victim of the Armero volcanic disaster, died after being trapped in a mud hole for 60 hours.	Image
1987	(United States) / (Israel) Alon Reininger	AIDS	American AIDS patient Ken Meeks sits in a wheelchair. On his arms are numerous lesions caused by Kaposi's sarcoma.	Image
1988	(United States) Anthony Suau	Election in South Korea	On 18 December 1987, a desperate mother in Kuro, South Korea leans against a riot policeman's shield and begs for mercy for her son, arrested during a demonstration. After the November election there were protests against the government, accused of electoral fraud.	Image
1989	(United States) David Turnley	Earthquake in Armenia	In Leninakan, Boris Abgarzian grieves for his 17-year-old son, a victim of the Armenian earthquake.	Image
1990	(United States) Charlie Cole	Tiananmen Square Massacre	A protester, later dubbed Tank Man, stops a group of People's Liberation Army battle tanks during the massacre in Tiananmen, Beijing.	Image
1991	(France) Georges Merillon	Kosovo conflict	The family of Nashim Elshani grieves around his deathbed; he was killed while protesting for Kosovar autonomy.	Image
1992	(United States) David Turnley	Gulf War	US Sergeant Ken Kozakiewicz mourns the death of fellow soldier Andy Alaniz, killed by friendly fire.	Image
1993	(United States) James Nachtwey	Famine in Somalia	A Somali mother lifts up the body of her child, killed by malnutrition.	Image
1994	(Canada) Larry Towell	Palestinian territories	Palestinian children raise their toy guns in the air.	Image
1995	(United States) James Nachtwey	Rwandan genocide	Hutu man mutilated by the Hutu Interahamwe militia, who suspected him of sympathizing with the Tutsi rebels.	Image
1996	(United States) Lucian Perkins	First Chechen War	A boy peers out of a refugee-packed bus fleeing fighting near Shali, Chechnya and heading for Grozny.	Image
1997	(Italy) Francesco Zizola	Angolan Civil War	Young land mine victims play in the Angolan city of Kuito.	Image
1998	(Algeria) Hocine	Algerian Civil War	A woman mourns the victims of a massacre in Bentalha, Algeria.	Image
1999	(United States) Dayna Smith	Kosovo conflict	Relatives and friends comfort the widow of a KLA fighter, shot dead while on patrol the previous day.	Image
2000	(Denmark) Claus Bjørn Larsen	Kosovo War	A wounded Kosovar Albanian refugee walks the streets of Kukës, Albania.	Image
2001	(United States) Lara Jo Regan	Immigration to the United States	A Mexican immigrant works in order to feed her children.	Image
2002	(Denmark) Erik Refner	Refugee disaster in Afghanistan	In the Jalozai refugee camp, the body of an Afghan boy is prepared for burial.	Image
2003	(Armenia) / (United States) Eric Grigorian	Earthquake in Iran	A boy holds the trousers of his dead father, killed in the 22 June 2002 earthquake.	Image
2004	(France) Jean-Marc Bouju	Iraq War	An Iraqi prisoner of war with a hood over his head comforts his son at a holding centre.	Image
2005	(India) Arko Datta	Indian Ocean earthquake	Two days after the tsunami, a desperate Indian woman mourns a relative killed in Cuddalore, Tamil Nadu.	Image
2006	(Canada) Finbarr O'Reilly	Niger food crisis	A mother and her child wait for food in an emergency center in Tahoua, Niger.	Image
2007	(United States) Spencer Platt	Lebanon War	Five young Lebanese ride in a convertible through the rubble of a bombed South Beirut.	Image
2008	(United Kingdom) Tim Hetherington	Afghanistan War	An exhausted American soldier leans against a wall and keeps his eyes covered.	Image
2009	(United States) Anthony Suau	Subprime mortgage crisis	An armed officer moves through a home following residents' eviction as a result of mortgage foreclosure.	Image
2010	(Italy) Pietro Masturzo	2009 Iranian presidential election	An Iranian woman shouting from a rooftop in Tehran in protest against the result of Iranian presidential elections held in 2009.	Image
2011	(South Africa) Jodi Bieber	Taliban treatment of women	Bibi Aisha, 18, was disfigured as retribution for fleeing her husband's house in Oruzgan province, in the center of Afghanistan. At the age of 12, Aisha and her younger sister had been given to the family of a Taliban fighter under a Pashtun tribal custom for settling disputes.	Image
2012	(Spain) Samuel Aranda	Protests in Yemen, Arab Spring	A woman holds a wounded relative in her arms, inside a mosque used as a field hospital by demonstrators against the rule of President Ali Abdullah Saleh, during clashes in Sanaa, Yemen on 15 October 2011.	Image
2013	(Sweden) Paul Hansen	Victims of Operation Pillar of Defense	Grieving men carry to their funerals two-year-old Suhaib Hijazi and her three-year-old brother Muhammad, killed by an Israeli missile strike in Gaza City that killed their father, Fouad, and critically injured their mother. Taken 20 November 2012.	Image
2014	(United States) John Stanmeyer	African migrants	Migrants on the shore of Djibouti City raise their cell phones in an attempt to capture an inexpensive signal from neighboring Somalia.	Image
2015	(Denmark) Mads Nissen	Homophobia in Russia	The photo shows a gay couple during an intimate moment, reminding the beholder that life for lesbian, gay, bisexual or transgender (LGBT) people is becoming increasingly difficult in Russia.	Image
2016	(Australia) Warren Richardson	European migrant crisis	A nocturnal image showing a man passing a baby through a barbed wire fence on the Serbia–Hungary border, namely between Horgoš (Serbia) and Röszke (Hungary).	Image
2017	(Turkey) Burhan Ozbilici	Assassination of Andrei Karlov	The photo shows police officer Mevlüt Mert Altıntaş standing next to Andrei Karlov, the Russian Ambassador to Turkey, moments after he shot him in the back. Altıntaş shot Karlov to protest Russia's involvement in the Syrian Civil War.	Image
2018	(Venezuela) Ronaldo Schemidt	Crisis in Venezuela	José Salazar, 28, catches fire amid violent clashes with riot police during a protest against president Nicolás Maduro, in Caracas, Venezuela. Salazar was set alight when the gas tank of a motorbike exploded. He survived the incident with first and second-degree burns. President Maduro had announced plans to revise Venezuela's democratic system by forming a constituent assembly to replace the opposition-led National Assembly.	Image
2019	(United States) John Moore	Immigration policy of Donald Trump	A Honduran toddler cries as she and her mother are taken into custody by US border officials in McAllen, Texas.	Image
2020	(Japan) Yasuyoshi Chiba	Sudanese coup d'état	The photo shows a young man reciting protest poems during a nightly power cut in Khartoum on 19 June 2019. He is surrounded by numerous people who illuminate him with their mobile phones and chant slogans for the restoration of civilian rule. In a time of violence and conflict, the jury chairman deliberately chose a photo that symbolises hope and does not depict war and violence.	Image
2021	(Denmark) Mads Nissen	COVID-19 pandemic	The image shows the first hug Rosa received in five months due to the coronavirus. In March, nursing homes in Brazil closed their doors to all visitors due to the COVID-19 pandemic, preventing millions of Brazilians from visiting their elderly relatives. Assistants were ordered to keep physical contact with vulnerable people to a minimum. A cuddle curtain was used to safely allow hugging.	Image
2022	(Canada) Amber Bracken	Kamloops Residential School	The photo shows children's clothing hung on crosses commemorating the more than two hundred children who died of maltreatment, neglect and disease at the Kamloops Indian Residential School in British Columbia.	Image
2023	(Ukraine) Evgeniy Maloletka	Mariupol hospital airstrike	The photo shows a pregnant woman who was seriously injured in the shelling of the clinic and is carried away by helpers. Short time later, the woman and the unborn child are dead.	Image
2024	(Palestine) Mohammed Salem	Israeli invasion of the Gaza Strip	The photo shows a woman holding the body of her niece, who was killed by an Israeli airstrike in Khan Yunis.	Image
2025	(Palestine) Samar Abu Elouf	Israeli invasion of the Gaza Strip	The photo shows nine-year-old Mahmoud Ajjour, a Palestinian boy, who lost both arms in an Israeli airstrike in Gaza City in March 2024.	Image
2026	(United States) Carol Guzy	Immigration policy of Donald Trump	The photo shows the daughters of an Ecuadoran migrant named Luis grabbing to his shirt as he is detained by Immigration and Customs Enforcement agents after an immigration hearing at the Jacob K. Javits Federal Building in Manhattan.	Image

The list below contains all the winners of the World Press Photo Story of the Year award and information on their respective photo projects.
Contest year	Photographer	Subject	Description	Web link
2019	(Sweden) Pieter ten Hoopen	The Migrant Caravan	During October and November, thousands of Central American migrants joined a caravan heading to the United States border. The caravan, assembled through a grassroots social media campaign, left San Pedro Sula, Honduras, on 12 October, and as word spread drew people from Nicaragua, El Salvador and Guatemala.	Story
2020	(France) Romain Laurendeau	Kho, the Genesis of a Revolt	Young people make up more than half of Algeria's population, and according to a UNESCO report 72% of people under 30 in Algeria are unemployed. Pivotal moments in Algerian history, such as the 'Black October' revolt of 1988, have had angry youth at their core. Black October was harshly suppressed—more than 500 people were killed in five days—and was followed by a 'black decade' of violence and unrest.	Story
2021	(Italy) Antonio Faccilongo	Habibi	Habibi, which means 'my love' in Arabic, chronicles love stories set against the backdrop of one of the longest and most complicated conflicts in modern history. The photographer aims to show the impact of the conflict on Palestinian families, and the difficulties they face in preserving their reproductive rights and human dignity.	Story
2022	(Australia) Matthew Abbott	Saving Forests with Fire		
2023	(Denmark) Mads Nissen	The Price of Peace in Afghanistan		
2024	(South Africa) Lee-Ann Olwage	Valim-babena	Paul "Dada Paul" Rakotozandriny, a Malagasy man with dementia	Story

== Gallery ==
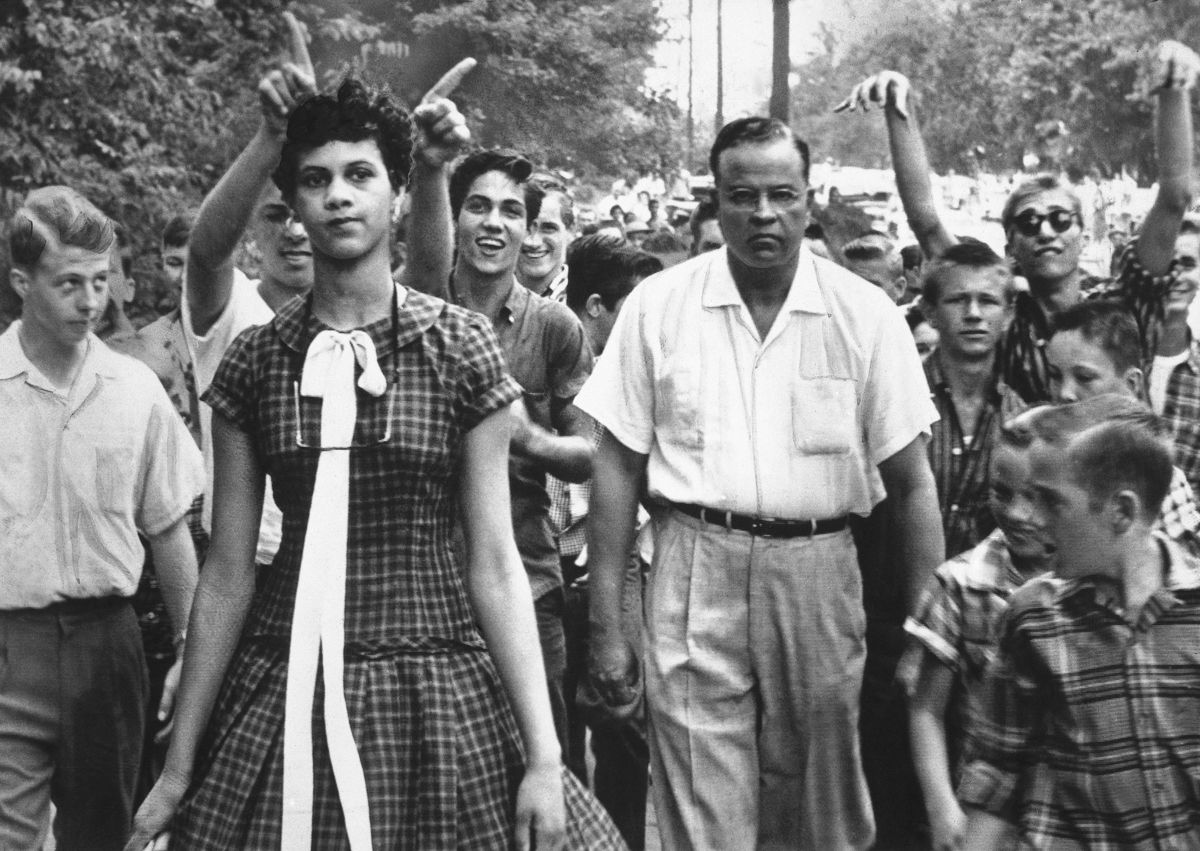
1957: Dorothy Counts

1961: Assassination of Inejirō Asanuma

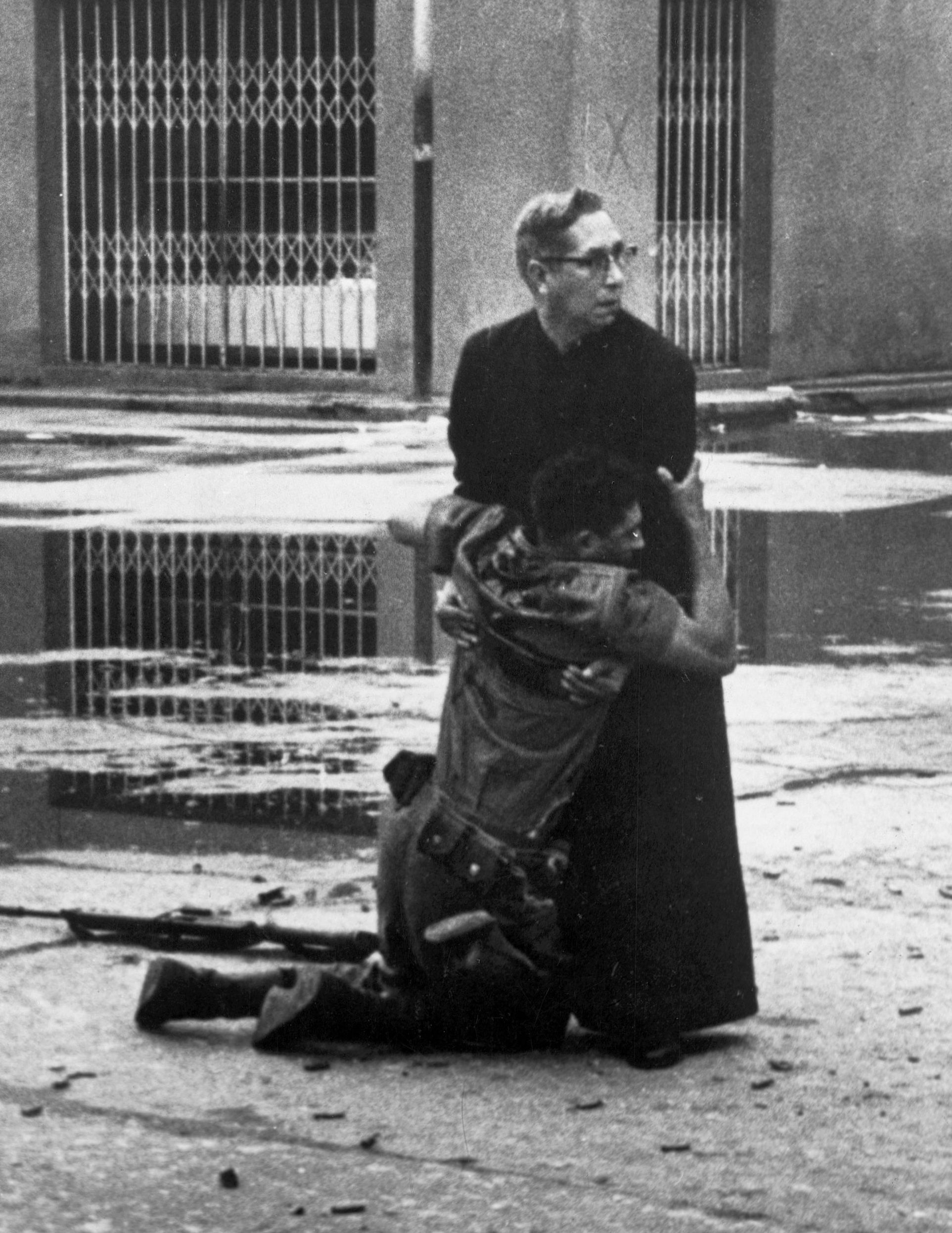
1962: El Porteñazo uprising

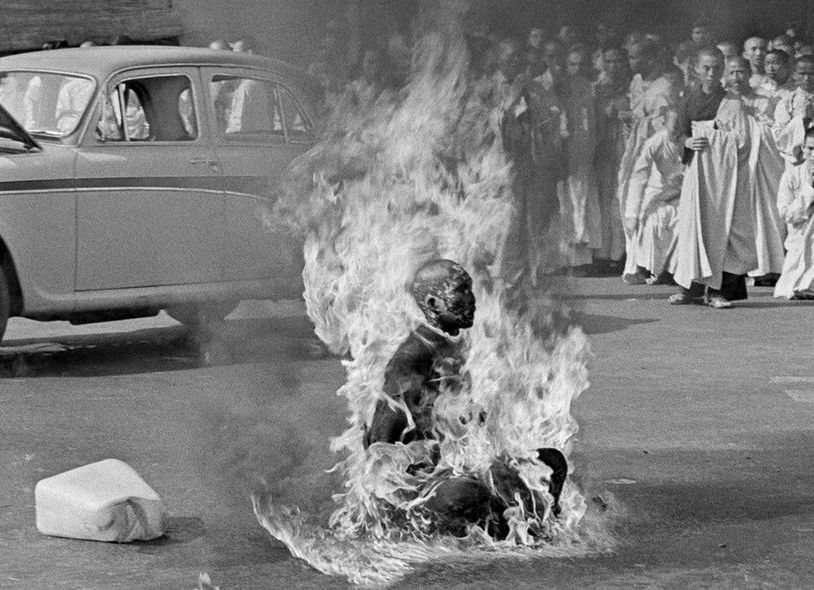
1963: Self-immolation of Thích Quảng Đức

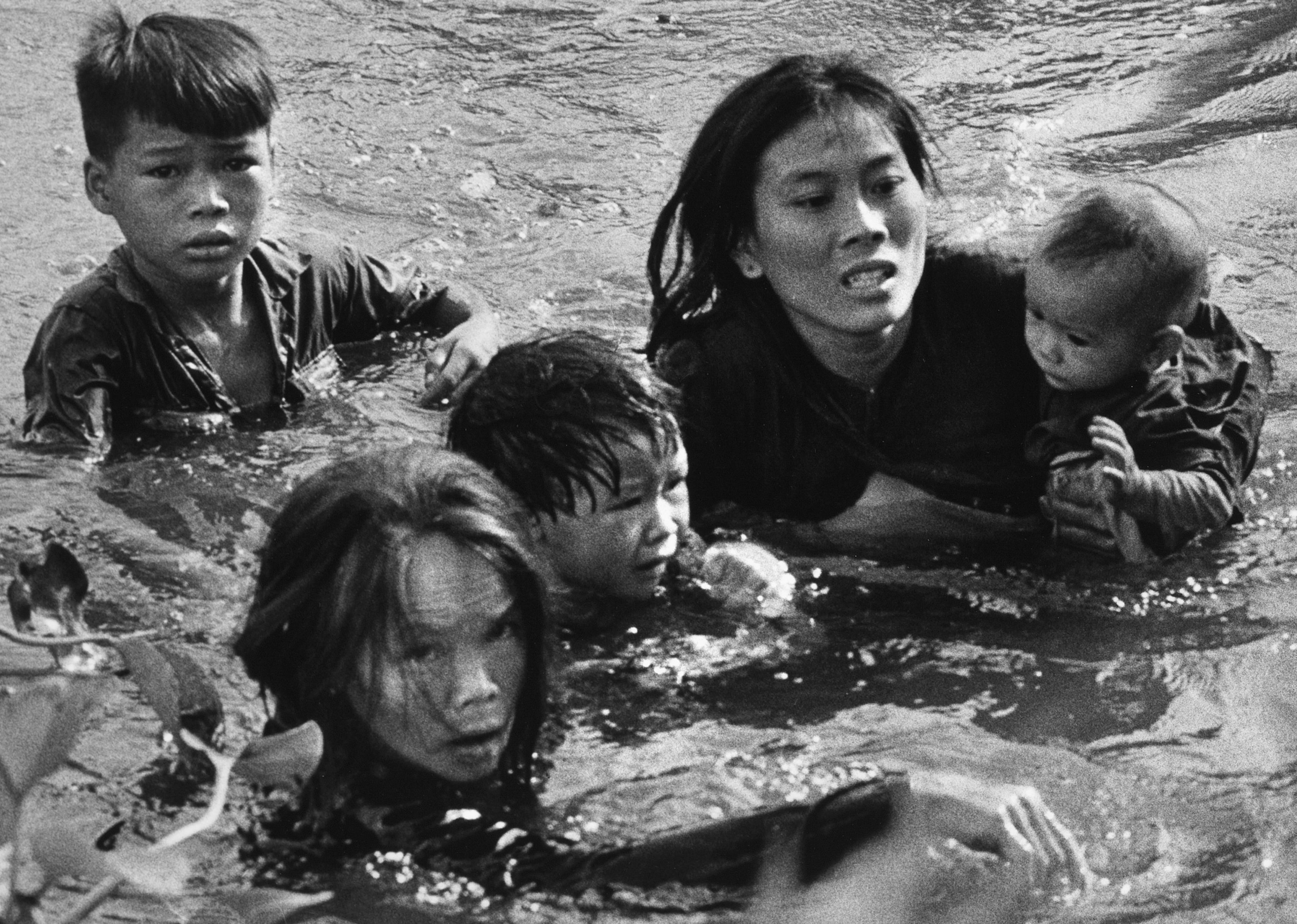
1965: "Flee to Safety"

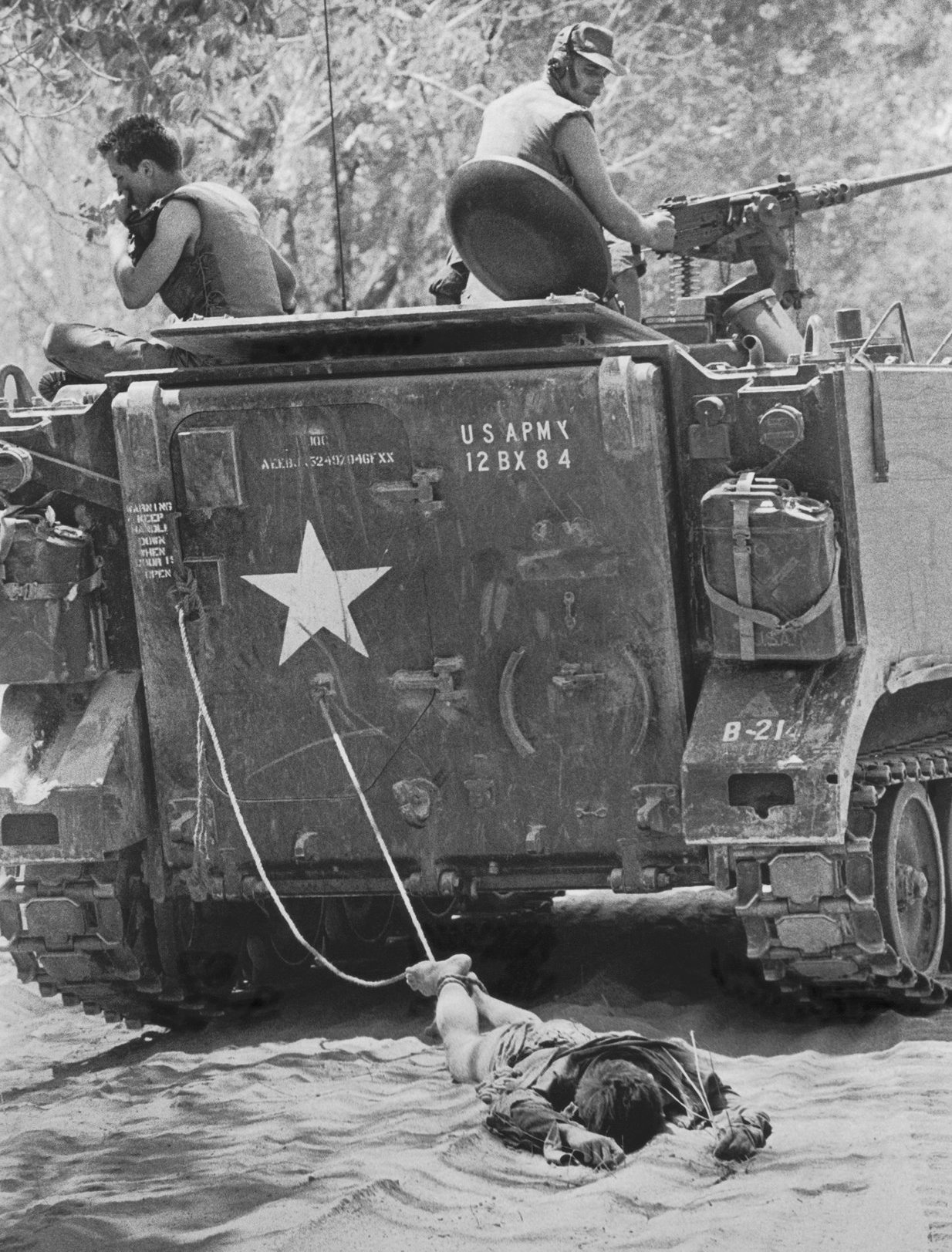
1966: "Dusty Death"

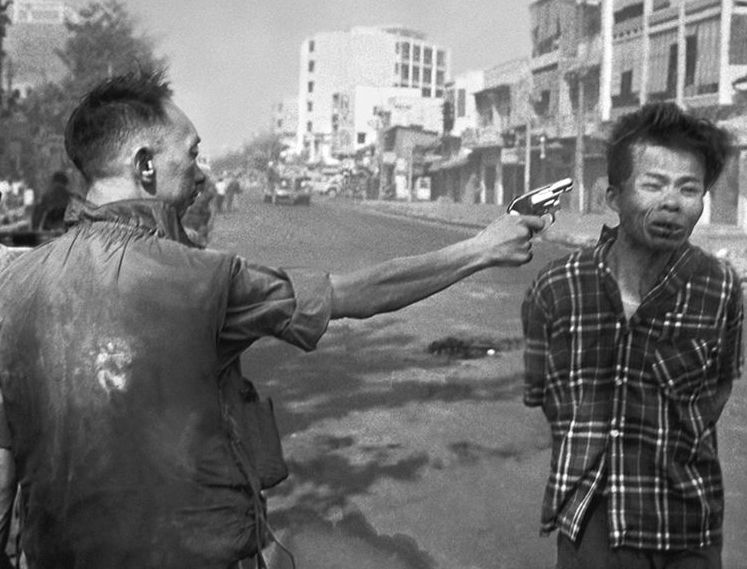
1968: Execution of Nguyễn Văn Lém

1973: "The Terror of War"

== See also ==
- List of European art awards
- List of photographs considered the most important
- Pulitzer Prize for Breaking News Photography
- Pulitzer Prize for Feature Photography
