= Hug curtain =

Device to enable close contact without transmitting diseases

A hug curtain, cuddle curtain or hug tunnel is an invention that was designed to allow people to hug each other while social distancing during the COVID-19 pandemic. They usually consisted of a transparent shower curtain fitted with pairs of sleeves on either side, and are designed to enable close contact without a risk of transferring disease.

The first recorded instance of these curtains was created by Antony Cauvin, a 29-year-old plasterer from Stratford-upon-Avon, England, in May 2020. A video of Cauvin and his grandmother using it subsequently went viral on Facebook. This was followed by similar curtains in the United Kingdom, Brazil, Spain and Belgium, with several appearing in nursing homes. One photograph of people using a hug curtain won the 2021 World Press Photo of the Year.

== History ==
=== Creation and internet virality ===
Antony Cauvin, a 29-year-old plasterer from Stratford-upon-Avon, England, had the idea to create the curtain so he could keep his grandmother Lily safe while hugging her. He purchased the materials for the device on the weekend of 9–10 May 2020. Cauvin himself has described the idea as "far-fetched and bonkers". Footage of Antony and Lily's first time hugging through the curtain was filmed by Cauvin's wife and uploaded to Facebook, where it gained 3.2 million views by 17 May and 160,000 shares by 20 May. They left the curtain at his grandparents' house to allow them to hug their seven other grandchildren and three great-grandchildren, with the device being disinfected between uses, as well as users being required to wear extra disposable gloves. Cauvin hoped for the invention to become obsolete due to the creation of a then-future vaccine for the disease.

=== Similar curtains ===
Cauvin's curtain was followed by several others in the subsequent months, with international reach. In May 2020 in Riverside, California in the United States, a 10-year-old girl created her own hug curtain after seeing another video, and used a shower curtain, Ziploc bags, a hot glue gun and disposable plates. On 14 June, Belgian retirement home Jardins de Picardie, which had not seen visitors for 11 weeks, installed a hug curtain which was decorated with flowers and bright colours. It proved popular with residents, and days later hug curtains were being used at a senior nursing home in São Paulo and at Geriatric Clinic Três Figueiras, both in Brazil. The latter of these formed a tunnel and was inspired by a viral video from the United States in which a woman created a plastic curtain to hug her mother. The same month, Westlands Care Home in Four Marks, England installed a cuddle curtain for families to use when visiting their relatives. The home had been closed to visitors since March that year due to the pandemic. Another curtain created in August allowed 90-year-old Freda France from South Yorkshire to have her first hug in 6 months, with her granddaughter, whereas a hug tunnel was also set up in an assisted living facility in Tucson, Arizona that month. Another curtain was used in Spain.

Upon their return to the British show This Morning on 1 September 2020 after a summer break, presenters Holly Willoughby and Phillip Schofield used the cuddle curtain to hug each other. Willoughby suggested that they "keep the cuddle curtain in the corner." Danish photographer Mads Nissen won the World Press Photo of the Year award in 2021 after capturing a photo titled "The First Embrace", of 85-year-old Rosa Luzia Lunardi receiving her first hug in five months from social worker Adriana Silva da Costa Souza through a hug curtain in Brazil. This curtain was hung in front of a church entrance, with the sun shining through it.

== See also ==
- Glove box
