= Karsten Thielker =

German journalist (1965–2020)

- Born: Karsten Thielker; 12 November 1965; Bensberg, West Germany
- Died: 3 October 2020 (aged 54); Berlin, Germany
- Occupations: Journalist, photographer

Karsten Thielker (12 November 1965 – 3 October 2020) was a German Pulitzer Prize–winning photographer and journalist. He focused primarily on exhibition design, photography and photojournalism.

== Life ==
He was born on 12 November 1965 in Bensberg in West Germany. He died on 3 October 2020 of esophageal cancer in Berlin.

== Work biography ==
Initially, he was interested in travel photography; but an assignment by Associated Press to cover the Yugoslavian War drove him to the war genre. He saw it as an opportunity to travel and to check his possible reactions in extreme situations, so he seized it: his career in conflict zones had started.

Thielker's most famous work is a photograph of Rwandan refugees carrying water back to a camp in Tanzania that won him a Pulitzer Prize in 1995. At that time, he reported the Hutus and Tutsis overwhelming civil war together with Jaqueline Artz, Javier Bauluz and Jean-Marc Bouju.

His works have been exhibited in various European countries, in Mexico and Nigeria and he has also conducted workshops for the Goethe Institute in Laos, Nigeria and Guadalajara, México.

Thielker worked for the Rhein-Zeitung from 1981 to 1990, and for the Associated Press from 1990 to 1996 and as a freelance photographer from Berlin since 1997. He is known to be one of those photo journalists who have worked surrounded by confrontations with death, ethical issues and the consequences they witness when they report from conflict zones.

Thielker also performed consultancy for the daily newspaper Tageszeitung and for Internet Image Database (www.piaxa.com).

== Awards ==
- 1995: Pulitzer Prize
- 2002: Platz Rückblende
