= Death Makes the News =

2017 book by Jessica M. Fishman

- The cover of the first edition, featuring the widely publicized photo of the assassination of Andrei Karlov
- Author: Jessica M. Fishman
- Language: English
- Subject: Media depiction of death
- Publisher: New York University Press
- Publication date: 2017
- Publication place: United States
- Pages: 281
- ISBN: 978-0-8147-7075-7
- OCLC: 982607558
- Dewey Decimal: 070.4
- LC Class: PN4784.D37 F57 2017

Death Makes the News: How the Media Censor and Display the Dead is a book by social and behavioral scientist Jessica M. Fishman. It was published in 2017 by New York University Press. The book focuses on the media's response to and portrayal of violent events, particularly when it comes to photographs. It also focuses on newsworthiness of tragedies, and comparisons in how different types of events, like natural disasters or mass murder, are covered, and the usage by relatives of victims of photos to attempt to get justice. The book itself contains photos of the dead in some cases, with the cover featuring the widely publicized photo of the assassination of Andrei Karlov.

Fishman based her research off of an analysis of the photos included in the coverage of four American news outlets, both tabloid and broadsheet, as well as interviews with several journalists in those and other publications. In her conclusion, she goes against the typical perception of the media's coverage of death, arguing that instead of using such photos to grab attention, American publications often actively resist publications of photos of the dead. She also presents evidence that, again contrary to public perception, tabloid newspapers are actually far less likely to publish photos of dead people than non-tabloid papers.

It received positive reviews, with praise for its evidence, theories and study of the role and presentation of death in the media. It was also praised for its usage of images, of which 67 are included in the book, though one reviewer believed their impact had been lessened by the monochrome printing and would have benefited from color. There was some criticism over its lack of context for the journalistic and historical information background, with some reviewers wishing it had provided more context. Another reviewer wished that the photographic analysis would have included a wider selection of publications, as they viewed the existing selection as leaving jarring omissions.

== Background and author ==
The book was published in 2017 by New York University Press. It has 281 pages and an index. The book's cover is the widely publicized photograph of the assassination of Andrei Karlov, censored by the text boxes.

Its author, Jessica M. Fishman, is a social and behavioral scientist. She holds research positions at the Annenberg School for Communication at the University of Pennsylvania as well as the Perelman School of Medicine. In researching for the book, she analyzed photos from four newspapers over the period of 1975 to 2005: the well-regarded papers The New York Times and The Washington Post, as well as the tabloid papers Philadelphia Daily News and the New York Post. Further she interviewed editors and photojournalists for the aforementioned papers, as well as other outlets: The Associated Press, CNN, ABC News, NBC News, The Philadelphia Inquirer, the Los Angeles Times, and The San Diego Union-Tribune. Most of the book's research is based on these interviews and the photo analysis.

== Contents ==
The book is split into two sections, "Death Concealed" and "Death Depicted". In total, the book includes 67 photographs, some of which include the photos of corpses, including some children. Fishman opens by discussing headline news, and how this relates to images taken by photojournalists. The first half of the book is focused on what Fishman perceives as the standard rules for how the media treats death, by concealing it. She argues that the common perception that the media showcases death imagery for attention often is false; she instead concludes that the American media resist publication of photos of corpses, viewing them in poor taste without adding much, and that when they do the photos are often of non-Americans (there were 30% Americans to 70% non-Americans in the photos Fishman examined). It also focuses on what makes individual tragedies newsworthy, and comparisons in how different types of events, like natural disasters or mass murder and school shootings, are covered. Several industry people interviewed by Fishman express their view that these images are distasteful and should not be used as the main focus of coverage.

The second half of the book, "Death Depicted", focuses on what Fishman identifies as the exception to the typical rules on not depicting death. She brings up several cases where the families of the victims sought visibility through photos of the dead, including the lynching of Emmett Till and a gang rape and murder in Utter Pradesh. She says that in these cases, the photos are considered motivating for political action, versus purely vulgar. When death is shown, she argues, it is usually shown indirectly, pixelated, or instead photos of the victims while living, survivors, or rescuers. She views this as ironic compared to photojournalist practice in topics that aren't death, saying that: "Normally, the camera is used to capture proof at any cost, but in reports on death, images are often newsworthy precisely because of what is not clearly seen". Fishman also presents evidence that contrary to public perception, tabloid publications are actually far less likely to publish image of corpses than more prestigious broadsheet papers.

== Reception ==
The book received largely positive reviews. A review from S. Lenig of Choice magazine recommended it. Sharon Wheeler writing for the magazine Times Higher Education called the book "fascinating, but flawed" and said it opened the way for future discussion, while Newspaper Research Journal's John P. Ferré praised it as a "significant study of value-laden dimensions of gatekeeping decisions, one that should stimulate discussions in classes on media sociology and media ethics", and called it "clearly written, liberally illustrated and compelling". David D. Perlmutter of the International Journal of Communication praised the book, calling it a "breakout study and milestone contribution", saying it was "likely to remain a highly cited standard source". The publication ProtoView noted that the book's usage of photos could distress some readers.

Matt Coward, in a review for the Canadian Journal of Sociology, called the book a "powerful and informed dissection of the presentation of both death and the corpse in contemporary American media", and a "carefully considered and thoughtful thesis". He praised its use not just for the discipline of sociology but for many different disciplines. He noted the cover censorship of the assassination image as "tongue-in-cheek", comparing this case to the book drawing attention to "the muffled noise of corpse photojournalism". Perlmutter viewed the book as demolishing "many fictions about the news business" and "upending a number of long-cherished assumptions" He considered as particularly shocking that it was "not so much the actual images recording the end of life, but rather the need to mitigate their cruel reality, which causes experienced practitioners to recoil when forced to deal with the subject of death." In particular he complimented the book for taking the reader "behind the curtain of newsrooms" through interviews, and called the examples and photographs used pertinent. Coward praised the book as "carefully crafted", with "meticulously copy-edited and beautifully type-set prose", and said it was a "holistic account of the role and treatment of the corpse in both historic and contemporary American media".

Coward praised her hypotheses, which he called innovative. Perlmutter did as well, calling her work "theoretically grounded" in a way that "uniquely reinforce[d] her conclusions" Perlmutter also perceived then-recent events as only reinforcing Fishman's thesis, listing as examples the Parkland high school shooting, the 2017 Las Vegas shooting, the Pulse nightclub shooting, and the 2017 Stockholm truck attack, of the sanitization of death prevailing in America but with photos being published with foreign cases. A lack of some context or background information was criticized. Wheeler pointed out as a particular criticism that the book's definition of tabloid was taken from Wikipedia, and criticized a lack of a "theoretical underpinning" of many tenets of journalism and newsworthiness, which she called the book's biggest weakness. Perlmutter viewed the book as lacking historical contextualization of the evolution of the perception of death. Wheeler also criticized that much information that she said should be in the text proper was "squirrelled away" in the endnotes of the book. She also said it would have been more useful had it had more discussion of how the images in question can be used to push for social change. Perlmutter wished the notes had been split into a separate bibliography instead of combining them. However, Ferré wished that Fishman had examined newsweekly publications, instead of only four daily papers, in her photo analysis. In Ferré's opinion this would have made her evidence stronger and would have included some photos that felt jarring to him in their omission. Coward wished the book would have used color photography for originally color photos instead of monochrome, viewing it as lessening the impact of several of the included photos; he praised the "cacophany of images".
