= Mevlüt =

Mevlüt (from Arabic: مولود, romanized: mawlūd) is a Turkish given name for males. People named Mevlüt include:

- Mevlüt Çavuşoğlu (born 1968), Turkish diplomat and politician; Minister of Foreign Affairs of Turkey (2015–2023)
- Mevlüt Erdinç (born 1987), Franco-Turkish footballer who played for Paris Saint-Germain as a defender
- Mevlüt Mert Altıntaş (1994–2016), assassin of Russian Ambassador to Turkey Andre Karlov
