= Palani Mohan =

Palani Mohan is a freelance Australian photographer currently based in Hong Kong.

== Biography ==
Mohan was born in Madras, India in 1967. He moved to Sydney, Australia as a child with his family. In 1985 he won a cadetship with the Sydney Morning Herald newspaper and spent the next ten years as a staff photographer covering news and sports. His work has been published by many of the world's leading publications including National Geographic magazine, Stern Magazine and Time Magazine. He is the author of four books and is completing a fifth on the Mongolian nomads who hunt with eagles.

== Awards ==
- World Press Photo
