= Yasuyoshi Chiba =

Japanese photographer

Yasuyoshi Chiba is a Japanese photojournalist, based in Nairobi, Kenya. In 2020 he won World Press Photo of the Year.

== Life and work ==
Chiba has worked for Agence France-Presse since 2011 and is currently its Chief Photographer for East Africa and the Indian Ocean. His photojournalism has mostly been made in Brazil and Kenya. He is based in Nairobi, Kenya.

== Publications ==
- Kenya Burning, Mgogoro Baada ya Uchaguzi 2007/8. Nairobi: GoDown Arts Centre, 2009. ISBN 978-9966718211. With Boniface Mwangi. Edited by Billy Kahora. In English and Swahili.

== Exhibitions ==
- Football as seen through the eyes of children in Cidade de Deus favela, with Christophe Simon, Visa pour l'Image, Perpignan, France

== Awards ==
- 2008: Public Prize, Bayeux Calvados-Normandy Award for war correspondents, Bayeux, France
- 2009: Winner, People in the News – Singles category, World Press Photo, Amsterdam
- 2012: Winner, People in the News – Stories category, World Press Photo, Amsterdam
- 2020: Winner, World Press Photo of the Year, World Press Photo, Amsterdam
- 2020: Winner, General News – Singles category, World Press Photo, Amsterdam
