= Mohammed Salem (photographer) =

Palestinian photographer

Mohammed Jadallah Salem (born 1985) is a Palestinian photojournalist living in the Gaza Strip. He won the World Press Photo of the Year in 2024. He has worked for Reuters since 2003.

== Awards ==
- 2010: 2nd prize, Spot News category, World Press Photo Contest
- 2024: World Press Photo of the Year, World Press Photo Contest
