= Ronaldo Schemidt =

Venezuelan photographer (born 1971)

Ronaldo Schemidt (born 1971) is a Venezuelan photographer. He won the 2018 World Press Photo of the Year award with a photo showing a protester, José Víctor Salazar Balza, catching fire during the crisis in Venezuela. The photo itself was taken in May 2017.

Schemidt was born in Venezuela and worked with Agence France-Presse since 2004. He was based in Mexico City since 2006.

== Awards ==
- 2018: World Press Photo of the Year award 2017, World Press Photo, Amsterdam
- 2018: First prize, spot news – singles category, World Press Photo, Amsterdam for the same photograph as won World Press Photo of the Year
