= Lara Jo Regan =

American photographer

Lara Jo Regan is an American photographer. Her work has spanned multiple fields of photography including photojournalism, documentary, magazine, books, and fine art. She is also a filmmaker.

The recipient of many of her field's top honors, the progressive hybrid nature of her work influenced the aesthetic direction of photojournalism documentary coverage of the entertainment industry and animal portraiture.

She contributed frequently to national publications including Time, Newsweek, LIFE, Los Angeles Times Magazine, Los Angeles Magazine, Premiere, and Entertainment Weekly and many others from the late 1980s to the mid Aughts.

Regan won the World Press Photo of the Year in 2000 and was the creator of the Mr. Winkle photo collection that achieved international cult popularity.

In subsequent years, she focused on long-term documentary and fine art projects while becoming a photography columnist for Artillery Magazine in 2011. Residing in Los Angeles since 1985, she has also built up one of the most extensive collections of Southern California street photography. and continues to author dog photography books

== Major projects and bodies of work ==
=== The Squat Culture of Runaway Teens (1990–1991) ===
Documented homeless youths and runaway teens in Hollywood, centering on life in the squalid and shadowy spaces where they lived and slept such as abandoned buildings and gas stations and inside the cement valuts of freeway underpasses.

=== Behind Oscar's Back (1993–1998) ===
Commissioned by the magazine Premiere over a four-year period, "Behind Oscar's Back" captured how the Oscar telecast is created from start to finish, featuring candid shots of the production team and stars photographed with backstage access.

=== A Street in America (1999–2000) ===
Documented life on an extremely diverse middle-class street in Los Angeles with each image representing a single household, the concept intending to give viewers the sense of walking down a street and seeing a snapshot of the life unfolding within each home while, as a whole, representing a microcosm of the melting pot at the turn of the century in America.

=== The UnCounted (1999–2000) ===
Commissioned by LIFE magazine, the extensive project documented poor, new and disenfranchised segments of the American population overlooked or vastly undercounted by the U.S. census as a means "to explore extreme poverty, new waves of immigration, remote and residual Native American enclaves and societal dropouts."

=== Drive-Thru (ongoing) ===
A large-scale installation depicting fast-food workers at night through their service portals with each image approximating the actual size of a drive-thru window so that the viewer experiences an immersive nocturnal drive-thru both "haunting and strangely seductive." The project relates to the photographer's longstanding interest in portraying disenfranchised members of society in unconventional ways while amplifying wealth inequity and the corporatization of the environment emblematic of the era.

=== Southern California Street Photography (1985–Present) ===
A large collection of Southern California street photography taken over four decades and straddling the millennium.

=== Dog Plays ===
Captures the comedy and drama of naturally occurring canine interaction from novel, intimate perspectives.

=== Dogs in Cars ===
A book of color photographs capturing a wide variety of dogs enjoying car rides.

=== Dogs on the Beach ===
A book of color photographs documenting canine life on the beach shot in multiple scenic dog locations throughout the United States.

=== The Mr. Winkle Photo Collection ===
Encompassed many different series of photos portraying the photographer's canine muse that became popular in books, calendars, cards and online and created one of the first viral internet celebrities.
