= Anthony Suau =

Anthony Suau is an American photojournalist and documentary filmmaker based in New York City.

== Life and work ==
Suau was born in Peoria, Illinois. He worked for the Chicago Sun-Times and The Denver Post, was a contract photographer for Time from 1991 to 2009, and has produced a number of stories for National Geographic magazine. He has dedicated his life and career to documenting the effects of international events on the lives of people around the world.

Suau has published five books, including Beyond the Fall, a ten-year photography project portraying the transition of the Eastern Bloc following the fall of the Berlin Wall, and Fear This, created with American journalist and author Chris Hedges and featuring blurbs by Howard Zinn and P. J. O'Rourke, about the war of images and slogans being played out in the United States while the country was at war in Iraq.

His work has appeared in National Geographic, Paris Match, Stern, The New York Times Magazine, The Sunday Times Magazine, Life, and elsewhere.

In 2009, he co-founded the nonprofit collective Facing Change: Documenting America with a group of socially minded photographers and writers to document the issues facing the United States during a period of economic uncertainty. As the project's president, he negotiated and signed agreements with the Library of Congress, Leica Camera, National Geographic, GEO, Le Monde, the Open Society Foundations, and PhotoShelter. Six months after a negligent board of directors took control of the organization's management, he resigned in June 2013 to work on several developing projects.

Suau directed his first feature documentary, Organic Rising, which examines the rise of the organic farming movement across the American agricultural landscape. The film's executive producer is Deepak Chopra, and its production company is Goldcrest Films. Elizabeth Kucinich, the wife of former U.S. representative Dennis Kucinich, is also a producer. The film was released in 2023.

== Publications ==
- On a Deux Yeux de Trop: Avec les Réfugiés Rwandais, Goma, Zaïre, 1994. Arles, France: Actes Sud, 1995. ISBN 978-2742705641. On the genocide in Rwanda.
- Dans les Montagnes où Vivent les Aigles: Grozny, Tchétchénie, Janvier 1995. Arles, France: Actes Sud, 1995. ISBN 978-2-7427-0565-8. On the war in Chechnya.
- Beyond the Fall: The Former Soviet Bloc in Transition, 1989-99. Network Photographers, 2000. ISBN 978-0953675609.
- Fear This: A Nation at War. New York: Aperture, 2004. ISBN 978-1931788533.

== Awards ==
- 1984: Pulitzer Prize for Feature Photography for his photographs of the famine in Ethiopia
- 1987: World Press Photo of the Year, from World Press Photo, Amsterdam, for a photograph taken during a demonstration in South Korea
- 1995: Robert Capa Gold Medal for his photographs from Chechnya
- 2008: World Press Photo of the Year for a photograph taken in Cleveland, Ohio, depicting an officer securing a home under foreclosure at gunpoint
- 2008: Infinity Award from the International Center of Photography, New York City
- 2010: Emmy at the 31st News & Documentary Emmy Awards in the New Approaches to News and Documentary Programming: Arts, Lifestyle and Culture category, for a web documentary using his photographs of the fall of the Berlin Wall in November 1989
