= The Manuel Rivera-Ortiz Foundation for Documentary Photography & Film =

- Abbreviation: MRO Foundation
- Formation: 2010
- Type: Charitable foundation
- Legal status: 501(c)(3) not for profit
- Purpose: Photography & Film
- Region served: Global
- Founder: Manuel Rivera-Ortiz
- Staff: 3
- Volunteers: 30
- Website: www.mrofoundation.org

The Manuel Rivera-Ortiz Foundation for Documentary Photography & Film is a non-profit private operating foundation headquartered in Rochester, New York. The foundation was established in 2010 by documentary photographer Manuel Rivera-Ortiz to support underrepresented photographers and filmmakers from less developed countries with grants, awards, exhibitions, and educational programs.

== Photography grant winners ==
- 2011 Mads Nissen
- 2012 Gustavo Jononovich
- 2013 Vivek Singh
- 2014 Mohamed Ali Eddin
- 2015 Pablo Ernesto Piovano
- 2016 : Enri Canaj and Ismail Ferdous

== Photography prize winners ==
- 2014 Camille Lepage
- 2015 Lucien Clergue
- 2015 Mo Yi

== Film prize winners ==
- 2013 Kannan Arunasalam
- 2014 Alfonso Moral
- 2015 Laurence Bonvin

== Exhibitions ==
- 2013 Rencontres d'Arles, Arles, France.
- 2013 Ikono Gallery, Brussels, Belgium.
- 2014 Rencontres d'Arles, Arles, France.
- 2015 Rencontres d'Arles, Arles, France.
- 2016 Rencontres d'Arles, Arles, France.
- 2022 Dress Code, Rencontres d'Arles, Arles, France.

== Publications ==
- A New Documentary, The Manuel Rivera-Ortiz Foundation for Documentary Photography & Film, New York 2013. ISBN 978-0-9896053-0-4.
- Dress Code, Kehrer Verlag, Heidelberg 2022. ISBN 978-3-9690008-2-3.
