= Orlando Lagos =

Chilean photographer

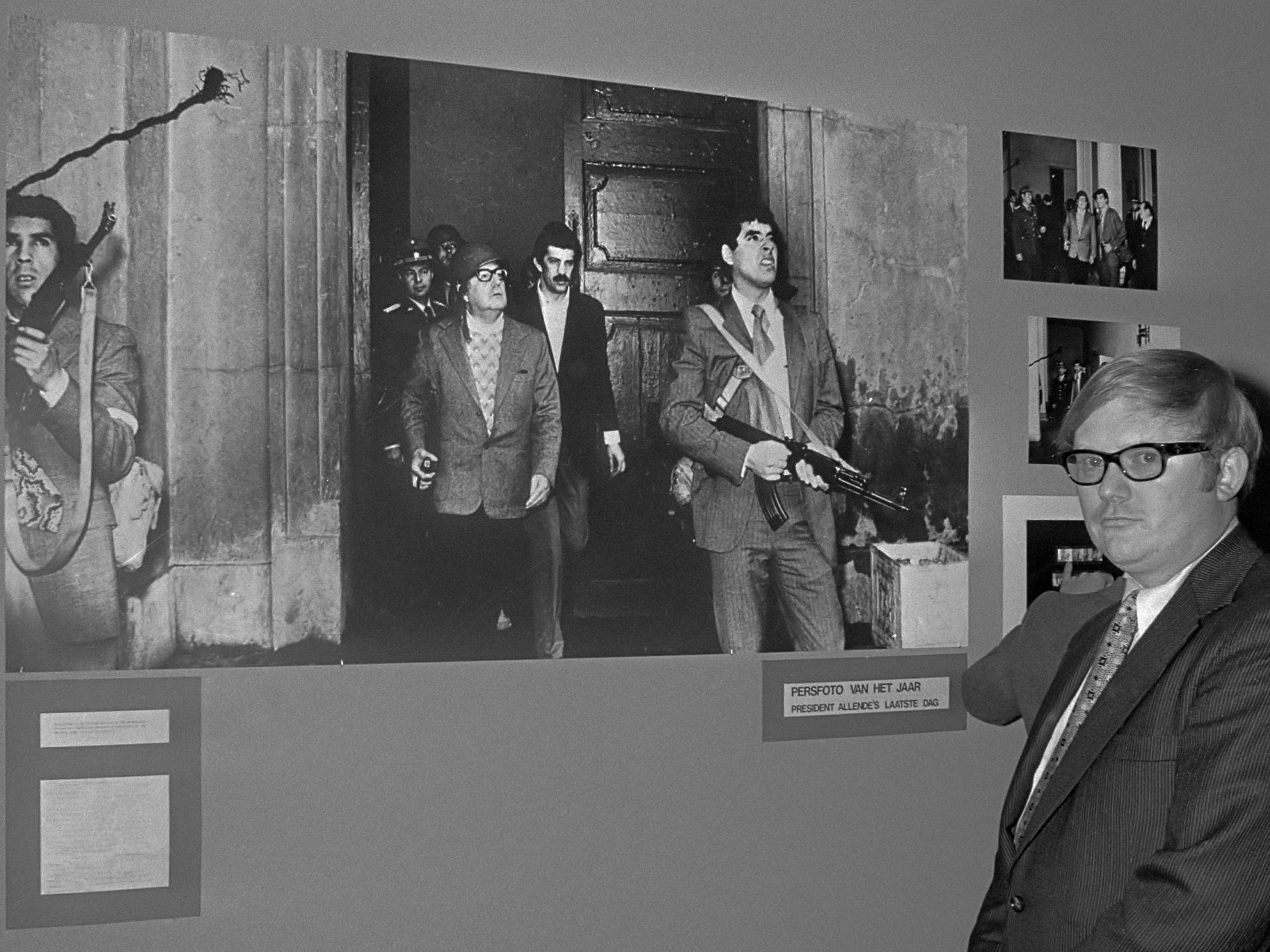
World Press Photo (1973): the last day of President Allende, by Orlando Lagos. The man to the right is Dane Bath of The New York Times, who distributed the image of an at that time still anonymous photographer

Luis Orlando Lagos Vásquez (January 17, 1913 – January 7, 2007), also known as "Chico Lagos", was a Chilean photographer best known for his work photographing Chilean president Salvador Allende.

Lagos worked with Allende in all his local and foreign political activities for over 20 years. It was only after his death that he was identified as the mysterious "Photographer of the Moneda Palace", who had taken one of the last photographs of the Chilean president during the 1973 coup d'état. One of these photographs won the 'World Press Photo' award in 1973, with the author labeled as 'unknown'. Lagos had signed a secret agreement with The New York Times not to disclose his authorship during his lifespan; the agreement included a US$12,000 payment for six photographs (which he never received) and a guarantee that upon his death his name would be revealed to the media. The New York Times did not complete the aforementioned agreement and simply 'forgot' it ever existed, leaving his authorship in the shadows until the year 2007 when the local Chilean newspaper 'La Nación' made a special report about him and his work with Allende.

== Sources ==
- La Nación, February 4, 2007 - La secreta historia del Chico Lagos
- World Press Photo, 1973 - 1973 World Press Photo Award
