= Pietro Masturzo =

Italian freelance photographer (born 1980)

Pietro Masturzo is an Italian freelance photographer. He was born in Naples, in 1980. He studied "International Relations" in Naples. After that he moved to Rome to study photography. He has been working as a professional photographer since 2007.

In February 2010, he was awarded the World Press Photo of the Year 2009. The winning picture depicts an Iranian woman shouting from a rooftop in Tehran in protest against the result of Iranian presidential elections held in 2009.
