= Dayna Smith =

American photojournalist (born 1962)

- Born: 1962 (age 63–64); Minot, North Dakota, U.S.
- Occupation: Photojournalist
- Awards: World Press Photo of the Year (1999)

Dayna Smith (born 1962) is an American photojournalist. She worked at The Washington Post for 21 years before going freelance. In 1999 she won World Press Photo of the Year.

== Life and work ==
Smith was born in Minot, North Dakota in 1962. She began her career at the Palm Beach Post in Florida and at the Washington Times. In 1985 she joined the staff of The Washington Post, where she worked for 21 years as a photographer, assignment editor and picture editor. In 2007 she went freelance.

Smith spent two weeks in Kosovo in October and November 1998 covering the Kosovo War for The Washington Post. A photograph from that time "of a grieving young woman whose husband had been killed the day before" won the 1999 World Press Photo of the Year. Smith is one of only four women to have won the award since it was first given in 1955.
