= Mr. Winkle =

Celebrity dog

Mr. Winkle (1995?–November 2017) was a very small dog of uncertain breed. He became a global marketing phenomenon and international cult figure representing homeless animals when a series of photographs of him were published in popular magazines and newspapers.

== Life ==
Mr. Winkle was rescued as a stray in Bakersfield, California, by Lara Jo Regan, an award-winning magazine photographer who remained his owner until the dog's death. Numerous calendars, books and cards were published featuring imaginative photos of Mr. Winkle in various settings, costumes, and poses.

After a long retirement, Mr. Winkle died of kidney failure in November 2017.

== In media ==
Mr. Winkle was the subject of many national and international newspaper and magazine articles and appeared on various television shows, including the September 1, 2002 episode of Sex and the City. Regan's book tours with Mr. Winkle from 2001 to 2005 – drew over 500 fans at each location, inspiring the producer of Sex and the City to incorporate him into an episode where he upstages the character Carrie Bradshaw at her first book signing.

Mr. Winkle appeared on the cover of Pet Life, Animal Wellness and Time for Kids. Time also named Mr. Winkle "Best Internet Celebrity of 2002" in their online supplement "On." By 2006, mrwinkle.com had garnered over 65 million hits. Mr. Winkle came to be known as the first animal celebrity meme whose fame was sparked by internet culture. By 2009, Regan had created over 150 "What is Mr. Winkle" photographic characters as well as an extensive fine art series of her muse, collected in the form of published works and art prints. A major museum retrospective of Regan's Mr. Winkle photographs took place from July 7, 2012, to October 7, 2012, at the Utah Museum of Contemporary Art in Salt Lake City.

== Bibliography ==
- What is Mr. Winkle?
- Winkle's World
- A Winkle in Time
- Mr. Winkle: The Complete Character Collection (2012)

== See also ==
- List of individual dogs
