= Camille Lepage =

French photojournalist

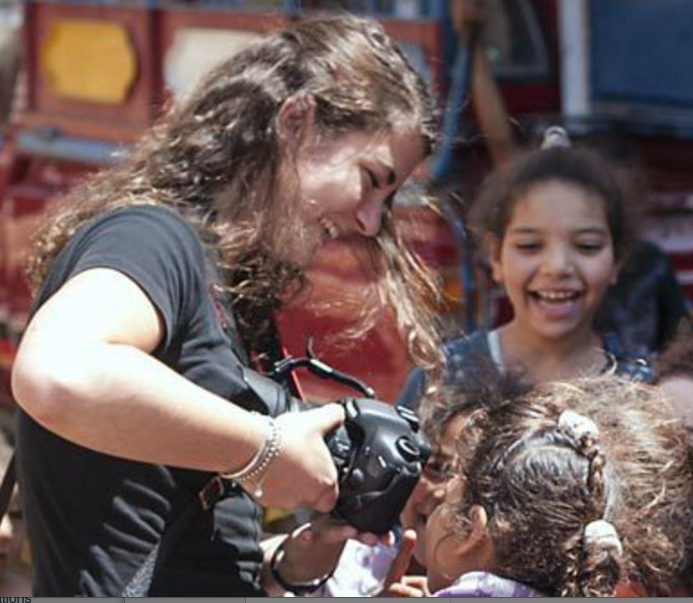
- Born: January 28, 1988; Angers, Maine-et-Loire, France
- Died: May 12, 2014 (aged 26); Near Bouar, Central African Republic
- Occupation: Photojournalist

Camille Lepage (January 28, 1988 – May 12, 2014) was a French photojournalist who was killed during the conflict in the Central African Republic in 2014. Her death was described as a murder by the French presidency and it marked the first death of a Western journalist in the conflict.

== Early life and career ==
After completing her secondary education in Collège Saint-Martin in Angers, Lepage went on to study journalism in Southampton Solent University, during which she completed an Erasmus year in Utrecht's University of Applied Sciences in the Netherlands.

She later specialized in photojournalism and worked independently in Africa, most notably in Egypt, South Sudan and the Central African Republic. After finishing her degree in Southampton, she moved and based herself in South Sudan's capital Juba in July 2012, a year and a half before arriving to Bangui (CAR's capital) where she spent the last few months of her life. She opened up about her interests in conflicts and photojournalism in an interview a year before her death, where she was asked about her top moments of her career to date and she responded, "Not sure I can talk about my 'career' just yet, I'm still just getting started! I find it amazing to be able to travel probably to some of the most remote areas, meet wonderful people everywhere and being able to document them." She was a well-known photojournalist and her work has been published in several news outlets, such as: The New York Times, The Guardian, Le Monde, The Washington Post, Der Spiegel, Libération, Le Nouvel Observateur, La Croix, The Sunday Times, The Wall Street Journal, Vice, Al Jazeera and was widely used by BBC. She had also worked for several non-governmental organizations including: WFP, Enough Project, UNESCO, Internews, Crown Agents, Deloitte, Amnesty International and Médecins sans Frontières.

Lepage spoke passionately about the seriousness of the news stories surrounding the Central African Republic conflict that are not covered by the mainstream media: "I can't accept that people's tragedies are silenced simply because no one can make money out of them", she said. "I decided to do it myself, and bring some light to them no matter what."

== Death ==
In November 2013, the UN warned the Central African Republic was at risk of spiraling into genocide, was "descending into complete chaos" and France described the country as "on the verge of genocide".

A week before her death, Lepage's last entries on Instagram and Twitter said that she was traveling by motorbike for hours with an anti-balaka militia down routes chosen to avoid checkpoints of African peacekeepers to Amada Gaza about 120 km away from Berbérati, where 150 people had been killed by Séléka rebels since March.

On May 13, 2014, Lepage's body was found by French peacekeeping troops patrolling in the Bouar region west of the country in a vehicle driven by anti-balaka rebels. Father Jean Maruis Zoumaldé, director of Radio Siriri in the region, said she had been in an area where there was intense fighting between the two sides. She had reportedly been traveling near the CAR border with Cameroon when she became caught up in fighting.

=== Reactions ===
- The Committee to Protect Journalists (CPJ) called for an immediate investigation into Lepage's death. "We call on the U.N. peacekeeping mission in Central African Republic as well as French authorities to ensure a thorough investigation into Camille Lepage's death", said CPJ Africa Advocacy Coordinator Mohamed Keita. In addition, the International Federation of Journalists (IFJ) and the European Federation of Journalists (EFJ) have urged the transitional government of the Central African Republic and all international forces based in the country to do everything in their power to ensure the murderers of French journalist, Camille Lepage, answer for their crimes.
- France - The Élysée said in a statement that French President François Hollande had ordered the immediate dispatch of a French team and police from the African force deployed in the country to the scene. "All necessary means will be deployed to shine light on the circumstances of this assassination and find the killers of our compatriot", the statement said, which also used the word assassinat ("assassination" in English) to suggest that Paris has information that Lepage was targeted deliberately. French Foreign Minister Laurent Fabius described Lepage as a "journalist and photographer of great courage".
- United Nations - The UN has condemned the murder of the French photojournalist:

- UNSC - The council condemned the killing of Lepage and said that "those responsible for the killing shall be held accountable." It also recalled in a statement that, in accordance with international humanitarian law, journalists, media professionals and associated personnel engaged in dangerous professional missions in areas of armed conflict are generally considered as civilians and shall be respected and protected as such.
- UNESCO - Irina Bokova, Director-General of the UN Educational, Scientific and Cultural Organization (UNESCO) said: "I condemn the killing of Camille Lepage, whose only desire was to show, through her work, the fate of marginalised populations", and called on the country's authorities to do everything possible to shed light on the circumstances of her death and bring the perpetrators to justice.

== See also ==
- List of unsolved murders (2000–present)

== Awards ==
- « Coup de cœur » from the National Photographers Association in the festival Visa pour l'image, in 2013
- Nominated finalist of the Bourse du talent #53, category Reportage 2014.
- 2nd place Pictures of the Year International 2014, category Portrait, for the series Vanishing Youth.
- Manuel Rivera-Ortiz Foundation Prize
- PhotoBoite 30 Under 30 Women Photographers - 2015 (posthumous)
