= Amber Bracken =

Canadian photojournalist (born 1984)

- Born: 1984 (age 41–42); Edmonton, Alberta
- Education: Southern Alberta Institute of Technology
- Known for: Photojournalism
- Awards: World Press Photo Award, Contemporary Issues, First Prize, 2017; World Press Photo Award, winner 2022

Amber Bracken (born 1984) is a Canadian photojournalist known for her reporting on issues affecting Indigenous peoples in North America.

She won a World Press Photo first prize in 2017 for Contemporary Issues and in 2022 won the overall World Press Photo of the Year.

She was arrested in 2021 while covering the 2020 Canadian pipeline and railway protests.

== Early life and education ==
Bracken is from Edmonton, Alberta and was born 1984. She obtained a diploma in photojournalism from Southern Alberta Institute of Technology in 2008.

== Career ==
Bracken's career started at the Edmonton Sun before she left to work freelance.

Her work featured in the Creative Endeavors exhibit in the Art Gallery of St. Albert in 2017. Her pictures have been published by outlets including The New York Times and Al Jazeera.

She also writes for the New York Times and other media on the plight of the Canadian indigenous peoples.

Bracken was arrested in 2021 while freelancing for The Narwhal and reporting on the 2020 Canadian pipeline and railway protests. She was released on bail soon after. Civil contempt charges were dropped by Coastal GasLink.

Her reporting on the Dakota Access Pipeline protests won her a World Press Photo first prize for contemporary issues in 2017. In 2022, Bracken was awarded a World Press Photo of the Year for her photo of Kamloops Residential School which appeared in The New York Times in 2021.

== Personal life ==
Bracken lives in Edmonton.
