= Assassination of Andrei Karlov =

2016 murder in Ankara, Turkey

- Part of Russian military intervention in the Syrian Civil War
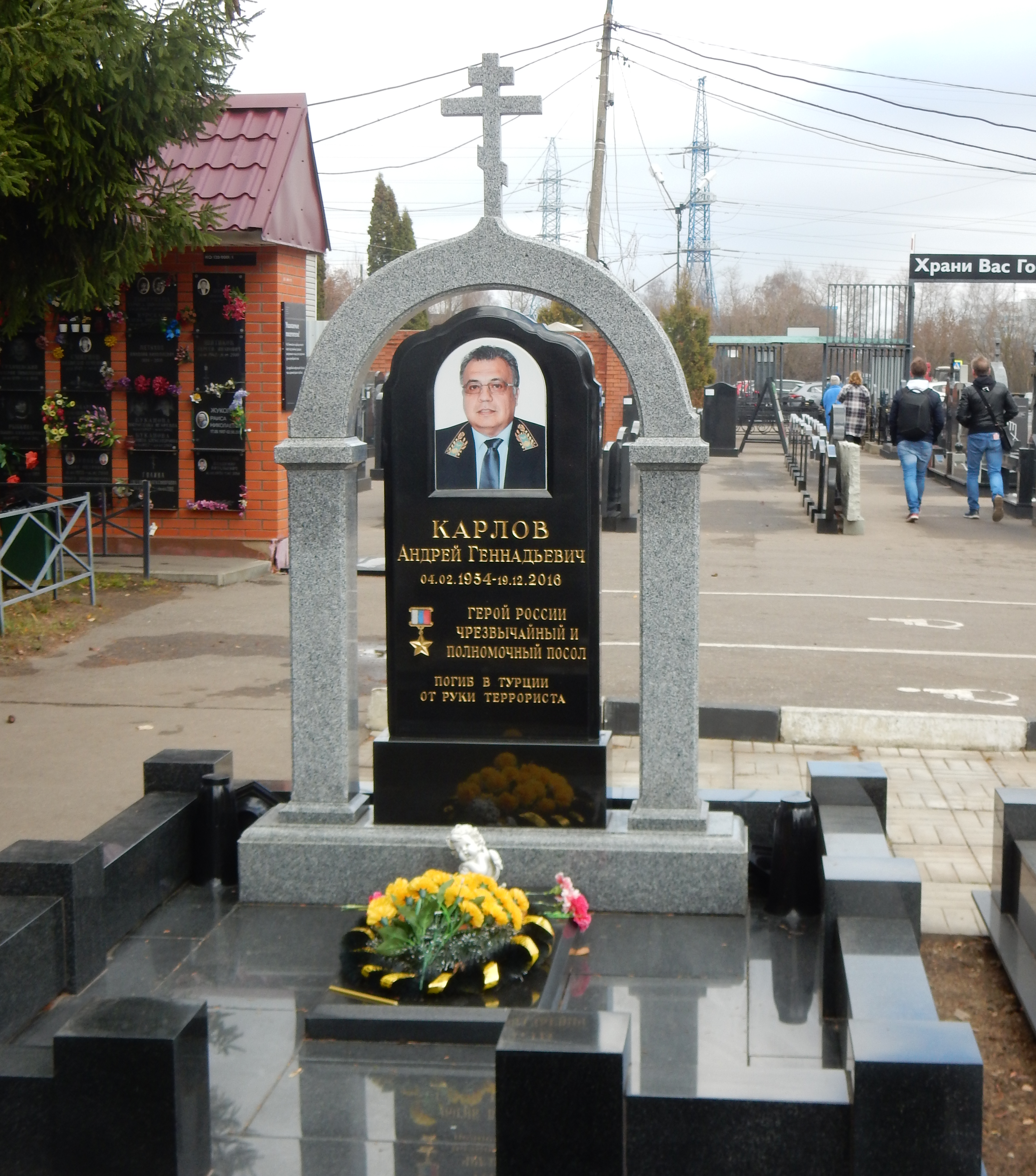
- Karlov's grave at the Khimkinskoe cemetery
- Location: 39.9086°N 32.8576°E; Çağdaş Sanatlar Merkezi, Ankara, Turkey
- Date: 19 December 2016; 9 years ago 20:15
- Target: Andrei Karlov
- Attack type: Shooting; assassination
- Weapon: Canik 55 TP9 Compact 9mm pistol
- Deaths: 2 (Karlov and the perpetrator)
- Injuries: 3
- Perpetrator: Mevlüt Mert Altıntaş
- Motive: Discontent at Russian involvement in the Syrian Civil War
- Accused: Gülen movement (according to Turkish officials)

Andrei Karlov, the Russian Ambassador to Turkey, was assassinated by Mevlüt Mert Altıntaş, an off-duty Turkish police officer, at an art exhibition in Ankara, Turkey, on the evening of 19 December 2016. The assassination took place after several days of protests in Turkey over Russian involvement in the Syrian Civil War and the battle over Aleppo.

External videos
- "Washington Post: Russian ambassador to Turkey assassinated in Ankara by off-duty police officer". The Washington Post.

== Background ==
The assassination took place after an extended period of a highly polarized political atmosphere in Turkey, and several days of protests by Turks against Russian involvement in the Syrian Civil War and in particular the battle over Aleppo. Russian and Turkish officials held talks on brokering a ceasefire in Syria during the evacuation of Aleppo. Russia, Turkey and Iran planned to meet to negotiate a settlement over the Syrian Civil War.

== Assassination ==
Karlov, the Russian Ambassador to Turkey, had been invited to deliver a speech at the opening of an exhibition of Turkish photography of the Russian countryside. The exhibition, "Russia through Turks' eyes", was being held at the municipality owned Çağdaş Sanat Merkezi centre for modern arts in Ankara's Çankaya District.

Altıntaş entered the hall using his police identification, leading gallery security and attendees to believe he was one of Karlov's personal bodyguards. Karlov had begun his speech when Altıntaş suddenly fired several shots at the Russian ambassador from the back, fatally wounding him and injuring several other people.

After shooting Karlov, Altıntaş circled the room, smashing pictures that were on display and shouting in Arabic and Turkish: "Allahu Akbar (God is great). We are the descendants of those who supported the Prophet Muhammad, for jihad. Do not forget Aleppo, do not forget Syria" and "We die in Aleppo, you die here". Shortly after, Altıntaş was fatally shot by Turkish security forces. Karlov was taken to the hospital, but died from his injuries.

=== Motivation ===
Turkish President Recep Tayyip Erdoğan declared that the shooting was designed to disrupt the warming of Russia–Turkey relations. The New York Times suggested a possible motive was revenge for the Russian Air Force's targeting of rebel-held areas in Aleppo.

Although seemingly an act of revenge against Russian military involvement in Aleppo as part of the ongoing Syrian civil war, some have suspected anti-Russian sentiment to be the cause of the attack. In a statement, President-elect of the United States Donald Trump accused the assassin of being "a radical Islamic terrorist".

In the immediate aftermath of the shooting, CNBC speculated that the killer may have been involved with Sunni anti-Assad groups, such as Daesh. Turkish authorities reportedly investigated Altıntaş' links to the Gülen movement; in a speech, Erdoğan said that the perpetrator was a member of "FETÖ". In contrast, Russian officials have accused the shooter of aiming to damage Russia–Turkey relations which had been normalizing since the 2016 Turkish coup attempt. Gülen described the killing as a "heinous act of terror" that pointed to a deterioration of security in Turkey.

The attack was praised by Islamic State- and al-Qaeda-affiliated accounts on social media. The words spoken by the assassin are similar to the unofficial anthem of Jabhat Fatah al-Sham.

President Tayyip Erdogan tried to attribute the assassination to the Gülen movement, but offered no evidence to support the claim. While Turkish and Russian officials alike condemned the killing, calling it an attempt to sabotage Turkish–Russian relations, Russian officials were hesitant to attribute the killing to the Gülen movement before further investigation.

== People involved ==
=== Victim ===
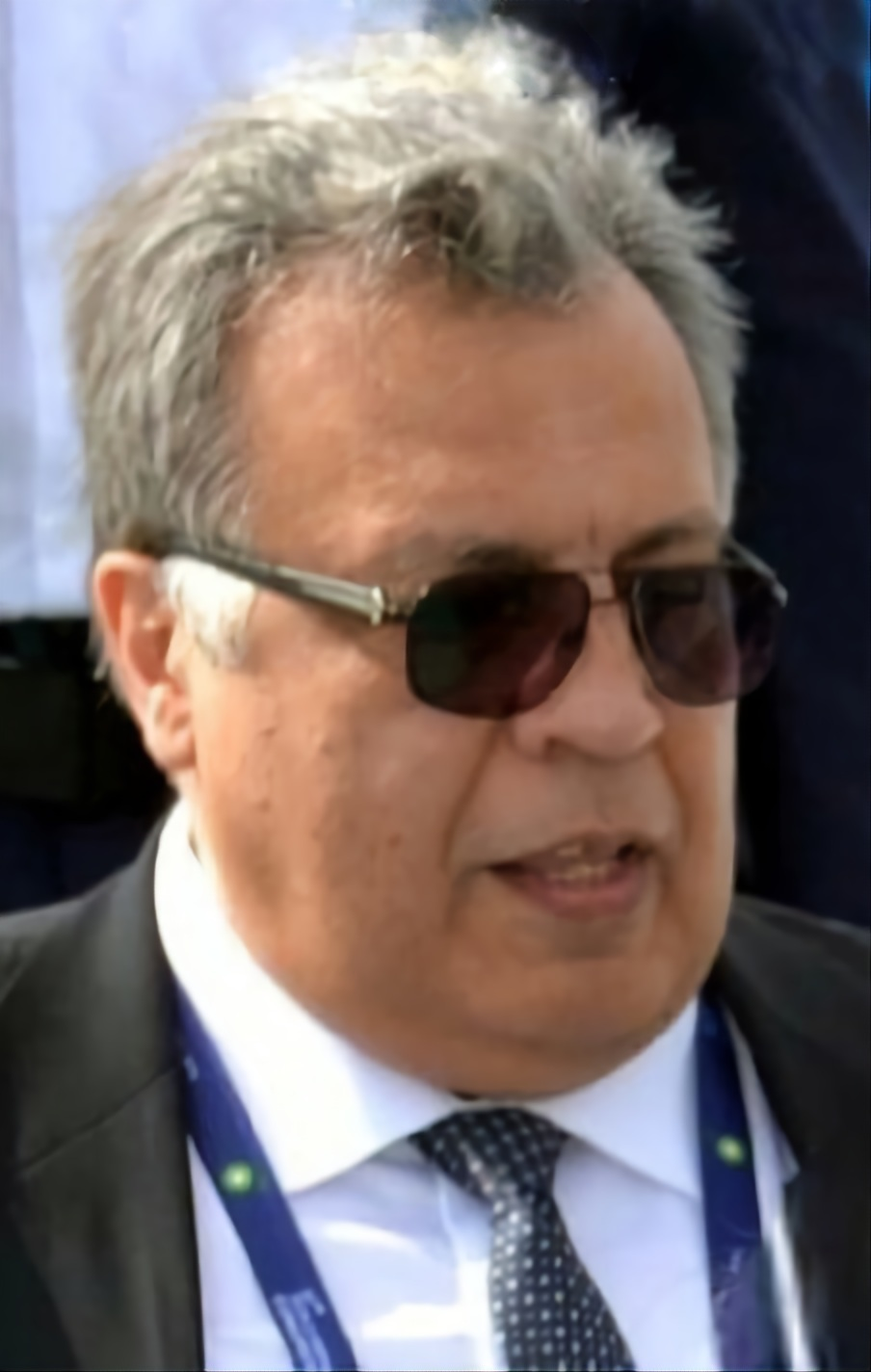
Andrei Karlov, the victim of the assassination, in 2016

Born in Moscow in 1954, Andrei Gennadyevich Karlov was educated at the Moscow State Institute of International Relations and the Diplomatic Academy. He began his career with the government at the Ministry of Foreign Affairs of the USSR in 1976. Karlov spoke fluent Korean and held various diplomatic positions at the Russian embassy to North Korea, including as Russian ambassador to North Korea from June 2001 to December 2006. He had been Russian ambassador to Turkey since July 2013.

Karlov was the fourth head of a Russian or Soviet diplomatic mission to be assassinated while serving abroad, after Imperial Russian ambassador to Qajar Persia Alexander Griboyedov in 1829, Soviet representative to the Lausanne Conference Vatslav Vorovsky in 1923, and Soviet ambassador to Poland Pyotr Voykov in 1927. Earlier, in 1903, the Russian consuls Grigoriy Shcherbina in Mitrovica and Alexander Rostkovsky in Bitola were also killed by Ottoman soldiers.

=== Perpetrator ===
The assassin was identified as Mevlüt Mert Altıntaş (Turkish: [mevˈlyt ˈmæɾt aɫˈtɯntaʃ]; 24 June 1994 – 19 December 2016), an off-duty Turkish riot police officer.

After failing the university placement exam twice, he graduated from İzmir Police School in 2014. His sister was quoted as saying that "he started to perform prayer five times a day in police school". He served on an elite Ankara riot police unit for two and a half years, and had been part of the security detail for Turkish President Recep Tayyip Erdoğan on eight occasions since July 2016.

A Turkish newspaper reported that Altıntaş had been suspended in early October 2016 for suspected involvement in the 2016 Turkish coup attempt, but returned to duty in mid-November.

Altıntaş had visited Qatar several times. Following the assassination, his activities in Qatar have been under investigation.

Altıntaş' body was rejected by his family; his parents stated that "We are ashamed of him because of the murder and we will not claim the body of a traitor." His body was buried in a cemetery for unclaimed corpses.

== Aftermath ==
Image by Associated Press photographer Burhan Ozbilici of Altıntaş shouting after shooting Karlov, who lies to his left.

The day after the killing, Turkish authorities arrested a number of Altıntaş' family members in his home province of Aydin, as well as his flatmate in Ankara, holding the family members for one day. Russian Foreign Minister Sergey Lavrov also confirmed that a Russian investigative team was scheduled to arrive in Turkey on 20 December to assist with the investigation.

On 29 January 2017, Turkish prosecutors said the entirety of Altıntaş' email had been deleted from his Gmail platform two-and-a-half hours after the assassination, by which point Altıntaş had been shot dead by police. In March 2017 Google told the Turkish prosecutors requesting the emails that all of Altıntaş' emails had been irrecoverably deleted.

Associated Press photographer Burhan Ozbilici was at the exhibition when the assassination occurred, and he reflexively took photos of the gunman, which were described as "iconic" and "[the] most powerful and shocking documentary photos of this year". The photo would later win the World Press Photo of the Year award. The 2017 book Death Makes the News by Jessica M. Fishman, which focuses on the media's representation of the dead, uses a censored version of the photo as its cover.

== Reactions ==
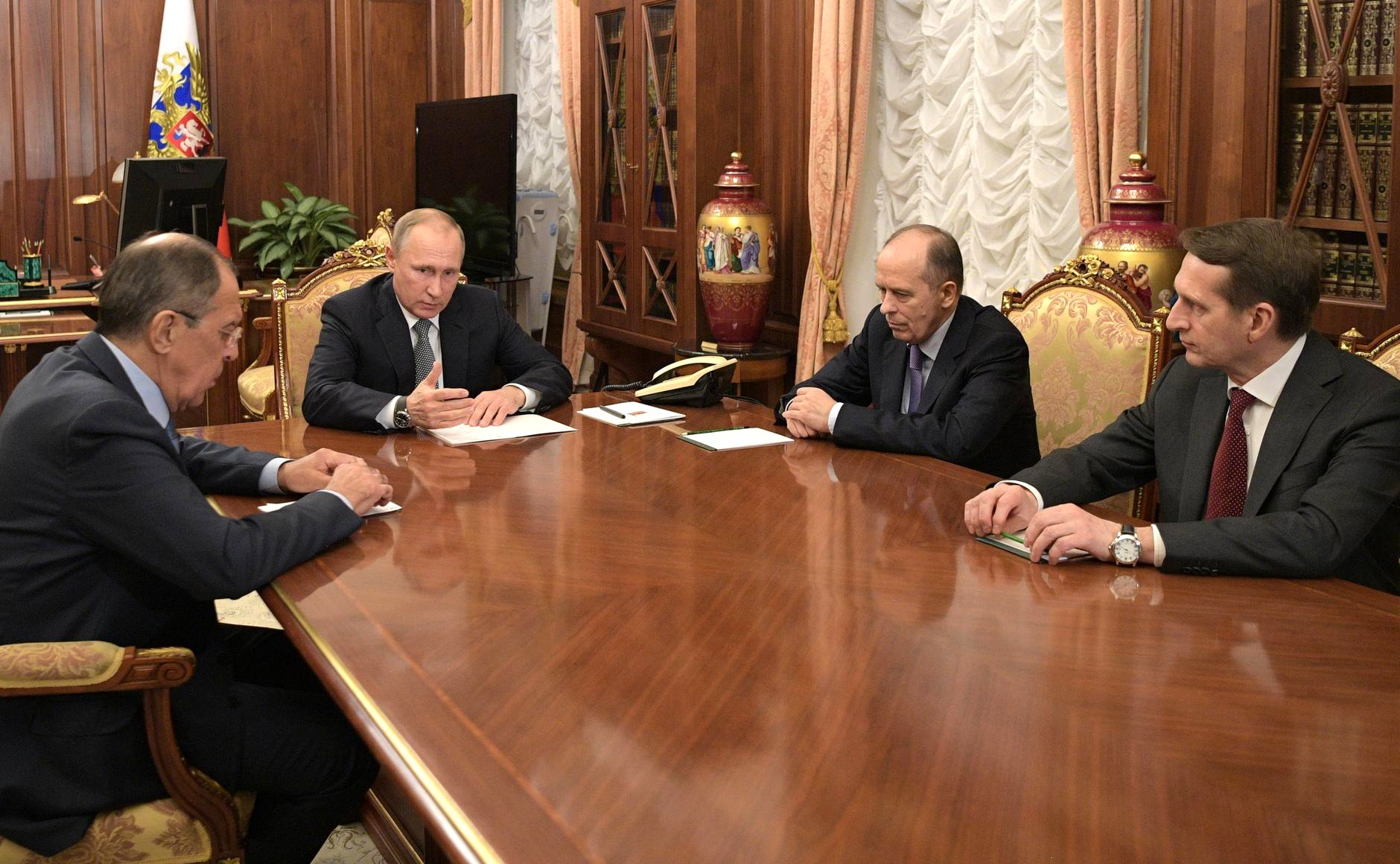
Russian president Vladimir Putin discussing countermeasures after the assassination

Many governments and heads of state condemned the attack and offered condolences to the family of Karlov and other victims of the shooting, as well as to the Russian people.

While ISIS did not claim responsibility for the assassination, it was celebrated by its supporters. The Islamist Jaish al-Fatah coalition, which includes the Jabhat Fatah al-Sham (formerly Al-Nusra Front), claimed responsibility for the assassination, according to the Egyptian newspaper Al-Youm Al-Sabea.

A Qatari journalist, Elham Badar, said the shooting was a "human" response to "Russian barbarism" in Aleppo and elsewhere in the conflict. New York Daily News columnist Gersh Kuntzman attracted criticism when he compared Karlov's murder to the assassination of Nazi German diplomat Ernst vom Rath by Jewish student Herschel Grynszpan, saying "justice has been served."

A woman on the board of Al Jazeera said that she believes the murder of Andrey Karlov was justified because of the bloodshed to which Russia has contributed in the Syrian civil war.

=== Turkish reaction ===
In Turkey, President Recep Tayyip Erdoğan said in a video message that "Turkey-Russia relations are vital for the region and those who aimed to harm ties were not going to achieve their goals", after having spoken to Russian president Vladimir Putin, adding that they "both agreed the assassination of Russia's ambassador to Ankara by a gunman was an act of provocation by those looking to harm relations of our countries." The Turkish Foreign Ministry pledged to spare no effort to not let "this attack cast a shadow on the Turkish-Russian friendship." Turkish Foreign Minister Mevlüt Çavuşoğlu announced that the street in which the Russian embassy is located would be named after the ambassador.

Turkey temporarily banned access to Facebook, Twitter, and WhatsApp after the attack. A week later, it also banned broadcasting images of the attack while an investigation was underway.

=== Russian reaction ===
Russian Foreign Ministry spokeswoman Maria Zakharova said: "Terrorism will not pass. We will fight it decisively." President Vladimir Putin stated he believes "a crime has been committed and it was without doubt a provocation aimed at spoiling the normalization of Russo-Turkish relations and spoiling the Syrian peace process which is being actively pushed by Russia, Turkey, Iran and others". He also ordered heightening of security measures at Russian embassies worldwide, and stated that "we need to know who guided the hand of the murderer".

Russian special protective unit Zaslon (ru) (Russian: «Заслон») was criticized for lack of proper protection of Karlov following his assassination.
