= Newspaper Research Journal =

- Discipline: Journalism
- Language: English
- Edited by: Kris Boyle

Publication details
- History: 1979-present
- Publisher: SAGE Publications (United States)
- Frequency: Quarterly

Standard abbreviations
- ISO 4: Newsp. Res. J.

Indexing
- ISSN: 0739-5329 (print); 2376-4791 (web)
- LCCN: 86647217
- OCLC no.: 42821649

Links
- Journal homepage; Online access; Online archive

The Newspaper Research Journal is a quarterly, peer-reviewed academic journal that publishes original social scientific (including newspaper management and media economics), historical and legal articles about all aspects of the global newspaper industry, including journalism. The editor-in-chief is Dane S. Claussen (Editor-in-Chief and executive director, Nonprofit Sector News). The journal is published by the Newspaper and Online News Division of the Association for Education in Journalism and Mass Communication in association with SAGE Publications.

Editors of the journal have been Gerald C. Stone (1979–88), Ralph Izard (1989-2000), Elinor Kelly Grusin and Sandra H. Utt (2001–17), and Dane S. Claussen (2017-2022). The current editor is Kris Boyle.

== Abstracting and indexing ==
Newspaper Research Journal is abstracted and indexed in EBSCO databases and ProQuest databases.
