= Jean-Marc Bouju =

French photographer

- Born: 1961 (age 64–65); Les Sables-d'Olonne
- Education: University of Texas at Austin; University of Nice
- Awards: World Press Photo of the Year 2004

Jean-Marc Bouju (born 1961) is a Los Angeles–based French photographer who won the World Press Photo of the Year award in 2004.

== Early life and education ==
Bouju was born in Les Sables d’Olonne, in France in 1961.

Has a master's degree in photojournalism from the University of Texas at Austin, having first been connected to Texas via an internship from his local University of Nice.

== Career ==
He has worked at the Daily Texan and the Associated Press where he won the Associated Press Managing Editors Award in 1995, 1996 and in 1997.

He has worked in Nicaragua, Rwanda, Liberia, Sierra Leone, Ethiopia, Eritrea, Zaire, and Iraq.

His photography of the Rwandan genocide co-won a 1995 Pulitzer prize for feature photography. In 1999, he was part of a team that won a Pulitzer prize for news photography for his photography of the 1998 United States embassy bombings.

In 2004, Bouju won the World Press Photo of the Year award for his 2003 photograph of US prisoner of war comforting his son while being held in near Najaf.

== Personal life ==
In 2003, Bouju was involved in a vehicle collision that damaged his spinal cord.

Bouju is based in Los Angeles where he lives with his wife and daughter.
