= Spencer Platt (photographer) =

American photojournalist (born 1970)

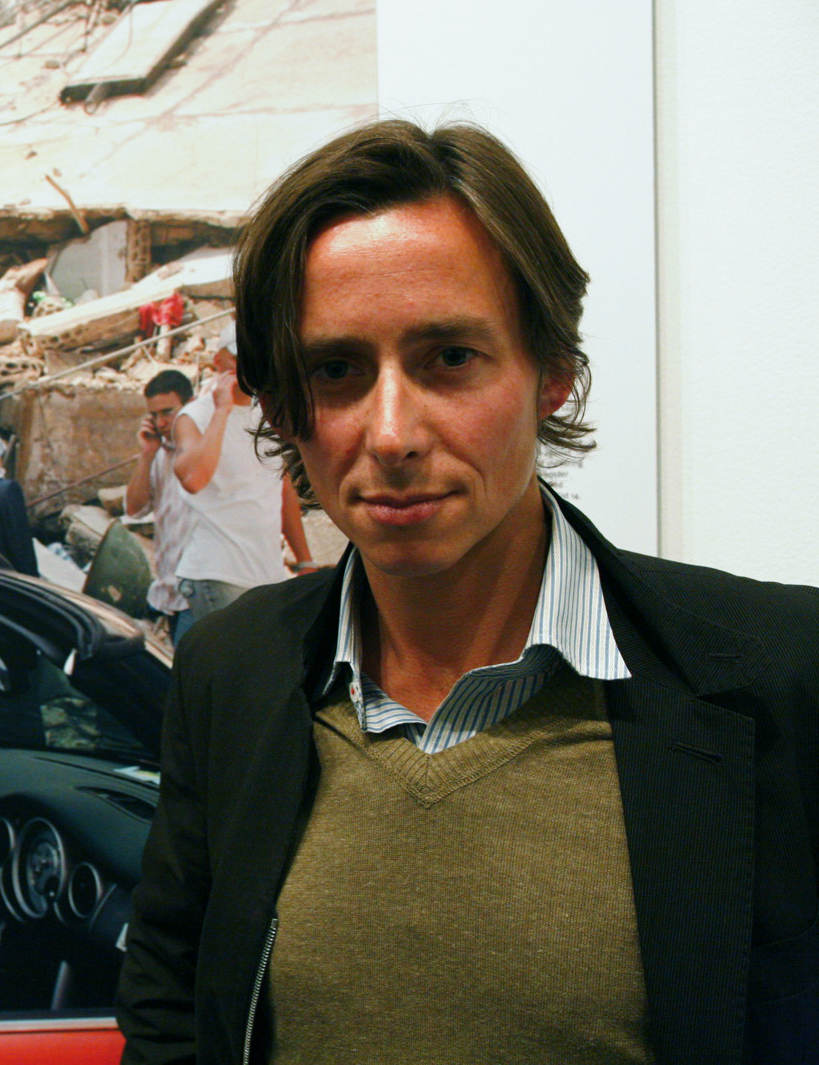
Platt in front of one of his photographs

Spencer Platt (born March 16, 1970) is an American photojournalist.

Since 2001, he has documented international conflicts for Getty Images in the Republic of Congo, Afghanistan, Liberia, Iraq, Ukraine and many other countries. At the end of the 2006 Lebanon War he photographed five young Lebanese driving through the rubble of the bombed South Beirut in a cabriolete. This image was named World Press Photo of the Year 2006. He was co-winner of the 2022 Pulitzer Prize for breaking news photography.

He was born in Darien, Connecticut. He has a sixteen year old daughter named Vivienne.
