= Paul Hansen (photographer) =

Swedish photographer

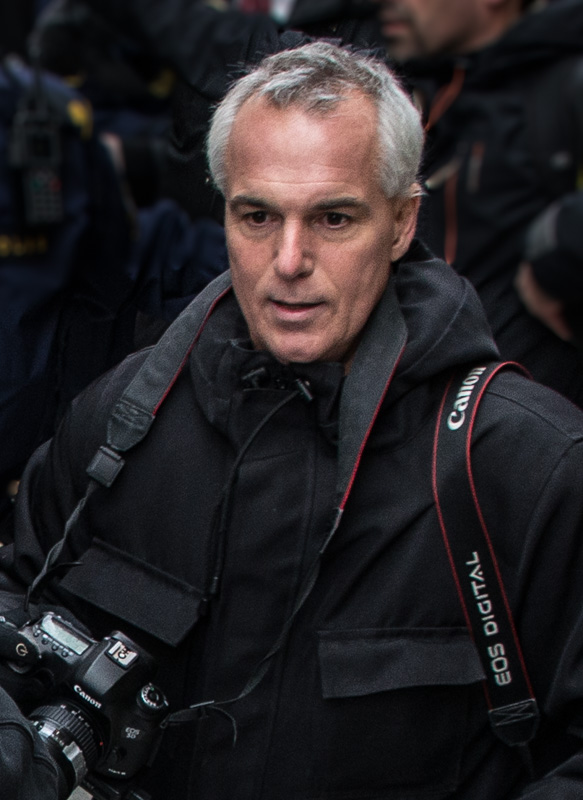
- Born: April 25, 1964 (age 61)

Paul Hansen (born April 25, 1964) is a Swedish journalistic photographer working for the newspaper Dagens Nyheter.

In 2013 he won World Press Photo of the Year for a photograph of the funeral procession carrying the bodies of two Palestinian children and their father of the Hijazi family killed during an Israeli air attack on their home. The picture, named "Gaza Burial" was shot on November 20, 2012 in Gaza City.

== Awards ==
- World Press Photo of the Year 2013
- World Press Photo 2nd Prize General news 2016
- "Picture of the Year" in Sweden 2 times
- "Photographer of the Year" in Sweden 9 times
- "Photographer of the Year," Pictures of the Year International (POYi), 2010 and 2012
- "Photographer of the Year," POYi, 2nd prize, 2015
- Second place in "Photographer of the Year in NPPA" 2024
- Award of Excellence in "Photographer of the Year" in POYi 2024
- First prize in "International news story of the year" in POYi 2024
- Award of Excellence in POYi 2024 "Israel-Hamas impact story"
- Second place in "General News" in NPPA 2024
- Second place in "Feature" in NPPA 2024
