= Mads Nissen =

Danish photographer (born 1979)

- Born: November 17, 1979 (age 46); Hobro, Denmark
- Education: Danish School of Journalism
- Occupation: Photojournalist
- Known for: World Press Photo Award 2015
- Website: www.madsnissen.com

Mads Nissen (born November 17, 1979) is a Danish documentary photographer and winner of 2015 and 2021 World Press Photo of the Year and 2023 World Press Photo Story of the Year.

== Life and work ==
Nissen was born on November 17, 1979, in Hobro, Denmark. He completed his studies with distinction at the Danish School of Journalism in 2007.

From 2004 to 2006 he worked as a staff photographer for the Danish newspaper Politiken, and subsequently as a freelance photojournalist for Newsweek, Time, Der Spiegel, Stern and The Sunday Times.

He moved to Shanghai, China (2007-2008) to document the human and social consequences of China's historic economic rise. Since 2014 he has worked as a staff photographer at the Danish daily Politiken, a newspaper internationally praised for its strong commitment to visual journalism. In addition to Politiken, his images have been published in Time, Newsweek, CNN, National Geographic, The Guardian, Stern, Der Spiegel and many publications.

He frequently gives lectures and workshop and has had solo-exhibitions across Europe and Latin America in such places as The Nobel Peace Center (Norway), The National Museum (Colombia), GAF (Germany), Frederiksborg Slot (Denmark) and Festival dela Fotografia Etica (Italy).

In 2015, his photograph of two gay men in St Petersburg, from a series on homophobia in Russia, was selected as World Press Photo of the Year. In 2021 he was nominated for the prize once again. In 2018 he was named ‘Photographer of the Year’ for the third time in Denmark. He has also twice been shortlisted as ‘Photographer of the Year’ at the Pictures of the Year International Award (POYi).

Nissen has published three photo books: The Fallen (People's Press), Amazonas (Gyldendal) and most recently We are Indestructible (GOST). This book provides a glimpse of the multi-layered seams of Colombia's past, present and future and is the culmination of many years of work in the country. It provides a portrait of a war-torn country navigating the complexities of newfound peace after more than 50-years of conflict.

== Publications ==
=== Books of work by Nissen ===
- The Fallen. Berlingske Media Forlag / Peoples, 2010. ISBN 9788799410101.
- Amazonas. Gyldendal, 2013. ISBN 978-8-7021361-0-4.
- We are Indestructible. GOST, 2018. ISBN 978-1-910401-23-1.

=== Books with contributions by Nissen ===
- A New Documentary. The Manuel Rivera-Ortiz Foundation for Documentary Photography & Film, 2013. ISBN 978-0-9896053-0-4.

== Awards ==
- 2006: Third Prize (with two others), Days Japan International Photojournalism Awards.
- 2007: Third Prize, Days Japan International Photojournalism Awards.
- 2007: Winner of the Scanpix-award and grant; Best bachelor project - Danish School of Journalism
- 2007: Danish Press Photo of the Year, Best Photo of the Year
- 2010: Picture of the Year: Issue Reporting Picture Story, Third Prize
- 2010: Picture of the Year: Photographer of the Year, Second Prize
- 2010: Danish Press Photo of the Year, News Picture of the Year, First Prize
- 2010: Danish Press Photo of the Year, Best Foreign News Picture story, First Prize
- 2010: Danish Press Photo of the Year, Best Foreign Picture Story, First Prize
- 2010: Danish Press Photo of the Year, Photographer of the Year
- 2011: Manuel Rivera-Ortiz Foundation Photography Grant.
- 2011: Best Of Photojournalism, Best Published Picture Story, Second Prize
- 2011: Danish Press Photo of the Year, Best Multimedia, First Prize
- 2011: World Press Photo, Daily Life Picture Story, Third Prize, for a Libyan fighter standing on a burning tank.
- 2012: Picture of the Year: News Picture Story, Second Prize
- 2012: Danish Press Photo of the Year, Best Foreign News Picture story, First Prize
- 2012: Danish Press Photo of the Year, Best Foreign Picture story, First Prize
- 2012: Danish Press Photo of the Year, Best Photo of the Year
- 2012: Danish Press Photo of the Year, Photographer of the Year
- 2014: Danish Press Photo of the Year, Best Foreign News Picture story, First Prize
- 2014: Picture of the Year: Issue Reporting Picture Story, Third Prize
- 2015: Picture of the Year: Feature Story, Third Prize
- 2015: Best Of Photojournalism, Portrait and Personality, First Prize
- 2015: Best Of Photojournalism, International News Picture Story, First Prize
- 2015: Best Of Photojournalism, Photojournalist of the Year (large markets), Third Prize
- 2015: World Press Photo, Contemporary Issues, Single, First Prize
- 2015: World Press Photo, Picture of the Year
- 2017: Danish Press Photo of the Year, Best Foreign Picture Story, First Prize
- 2018: Picture of the Year, Best Portrait, Second Prize
- 2018: Danish Press Photo of the Year, Best Foreign Picture Story, First Prize
- 2018: Danish Press Photo of the Year, Photographer of the Year
- 2018: Best of Photojournalism: Photographer of the Year, Award of Excellence
- 2018: Picture of the Year: Photographer of the Year, Award of Excellence
- 2019: PDN: Best Photobook, Winner
- 2019: Picture of the Year: Photography book of the Year, Finalist
- 2020: Picture of the Year: Daily Life, First Prize
- 2021: Best of Photojournalism: Photographer of the Year, Third Prize
- 2021: World Press Photo, Nominated General News, Single
- 2021: World Press Photo, Nominated for Picture of the Year
- 2023: World Press Photo Story of the Year
