= World Press Photo =

Dutch photojournalism organization and annual photo contest

- Abbreviation: WPP
- Formation: 1955 (71 years ago)
- Founded at: The Netherlands
- Type: Nonprofit
- Purpose: Photojournalism
- Headquarters: Amsterdam, Netherlands
- Region served: Global
- Method: Contest, Exhibition, Education, Research
- Key people: His Royal Highness Prince Constantijn of the Netherlands (Patron), Joumana El Zein Khoury (Executive Director), Janne Nijman (Supervisory Board Chair)
- Website: worldpressphoto.org
- The annual contest began in 1955; the World Press Photo Foundation was formally constituted as a non-profit organisation in 1960.

World Press Photo (WPP) is a Dutch non-profit organisation, based in Amsterdam, that runs the annual World Press Photo Contest — described by media scholar Marco Solaroli as "the largest and arguably most prestigious press photo competition in the world," language independently echoed by a 2007 United Nations note calling it "the world's largest and most prestigious annual press photography contest." Founded in 1955 as an international extension of the Dutch Zilveren Camera award, the organisation also runs an annual travelling exhibition seen at dozens of venues worldwide each year, publishes an annual yearbook in six languages, and operates education and development programmes for photojournalists, including the Joop Swart Masterclass.

Since 2022 the contest has organised entries by format across six world regions rather than by theme, a restructuring the organisation says was intended to correct historical underrepresentation of photographers from South America, Africa, and Southeast Asia and Oceania. The organisation's history also includes a documented series of image-manipulation scandals, prize revocations, and censorship disputes, and it is presently at the centre of a contested reattribution of The Terror of War, one of the best-known photographs it has ever honoured.

== History ==
=== Origins (1955–1960) ===
The World Press Photo Contest was first held in 1955, when the Dutch photojournalists' professional association, the Nederlandse Vereniging van Fotojournalisten, marked its twenty-fifth anniversary by opening its national Zilveren Camera award to international entrants. That year, 42 photographers from 11 countries submitted just over 300 photographs for judging, and a public exhibition of the winning work followed in December 1955. The contest's success led to the formal constitution of the World Press Photo Foundation as a non-profit organisation in Amsterdam in 1960.

=== Growth and internationalisation ===
Only News and Sport (single images) and Feature Stories and Photojournalism (picture series) were judged at first; a separate section for colour photography was introduced in 1965. Through the 1970s the Features category split into News Features and General Features, culminating in 1975 in the establishment of ten named categories and a one-off "Woman in View" prize marking the United Nations' International Women's Year. A separate Children's Jury prize ran from 1984 to 2003. By 1999, the contest drew 3,733 photographers from 116 countries submitting 36,836 photographs; specialised category juries were introduced from 2010. Entries later peaked at roughly 98,000 submissions in the 2015 contest before settling into the tens of thousands as the format changed; the 2026 contest drew 57,376 photographs from 3,747 photographers in 141 countries.

=== Restructuring (2021–present) ===
In 2021, entrants from South America, Southeast Asia and Oceania, and Africa each made up less than ten percent of the contest — 7%, 5% and 3% respectively. The following year's contest was restructured around six world regions to improve geographic representation. Executive director Joumana El Zein Khoury said of the change: "It is exhilarating to see the way in which the new regional contest set up has produced the changes that we were hoping for," and global jury chair Rena Effendi called it "an exciting new chapter." World Press Photo marked its 70th anniversary in 2025 with a retrospective exhibition and event in Amsterdam.

== Organization ==
=== Governance ===
World Press Photo is governed by an executive director and a Supervisory Board. Michiel Munneke served as managing director for over a decade before stepping down in November 2014; Maarten Koets served as acting managing director until Lars Boering was appointed in January 2015. Boering departed in June 2020 — a departure trade press described as sudden, and which followed several controversies including a high rate of contest disqualifications in 2016 and a potential defamation lawsuit — saying the coronavirus pandemic had upended the foundation's programmes and brought his exit forward. Arnoud van Dommele served as interim managing director from mid-2020 until Joumana El Zein Khoury, previously director of the Prince Claus Fund, was named executive director in November 2020 and took up the role on 1 February 2021.

The Supervisory Board has been chaired successively by Pieter Broertjes, a former editor-in-chief of de Volkskrant; Guido van Nispen, until he stepped down on 1 February 2021; and Marlou Banning, as interim chair, who remained on the board as treasurer. Janne Nijman was appointed chair effective 1 February 2022, with Jamila Aanzi joining the board as a member. Prince Constantijn of the Netherlands is patron of the foundation.

=== Funding ===
World Press Photo is funded through a combination of corporate partnerships, a lottery partnership, ticket revenue and grants. The Dutch Nationale Postcode Loterij has been a partner since 2004; in 2019 it renewed its worldwide partnership for five years with a total commitment of €2,500,000, and separately committed €1,190,000 to a multi-year programme linked to a planned World Press Photo exhibition space at the Westergasfabriek site in Amsterdam. Canon was a worldwide sponsor for 27 years, until the partnership ended on 31 December 2018; Fujifilm and PwC subsequently became strategic partners, with Fujifilm supplying camera equipment to the Photo of the Year winner. The foundation publishes annual financial reports; its 2021 report recorded 34,231 paying exhibition visitors that year, down from 82,707 in 2019 amid the COVID-19 pandemic, and disclosed a three-year lease on premises at Haarlemmerweg 4-6, Amsterdam.

== Contest ==
=== Format and categories ===
From the 2022 contest, World Press Photo replaced its long-standing thematic categories — which had included Spot News, General News, Contemporary Issues, Daily Life, Portraits, Sports, Nature and Environment — with a format-based structure judged across six world regions. Entries were initially divided into four categories:

- Singles – a single standalone photograph.
- Stories – a photo series of multiple images developing a single narrative.
- Long-Term Projects – a sustained body of work developed over more than one year.
- Open Format – introduced in 2022, admitting mixed storytelling media built around still photography; discontinued after the 2024 contest.

The six regions were originally Africa; Asia; Europe; North and Central America; South America; and Southeast Asia and Oceania. By the 2025 contest, the Open Format category had been discontinued and three categories remained — Singles, Stories, and Long-Term Projects — with three winners per region in Singles and Stories rather than one each. Under the structure used for the 2026 contest, the global jury selects 42 winners across three categories in six regions, from which the World Press Photo of the Year and two finalists are chosen.

=== Judging process ===
Judging takes place over approximately six weeks in January and February. In each region, a jury of five professionals from or working in that region makes an initial selection from the entries in each category. A global jury, composed of the six regional jury chairs plus a global jury chair, then selects the winners from those regional shortlists. The global jury is assisted by a secretary responsible for procedural matters, who takes no part in deliberating the merits of entries and holds no vote.

=== Entry rules and verification ===
Entrants whose work reaches the final stages of the contest must supply the files as recorded by the camera, which are examined confidentially by independent experts before prizes are confirmed. The organization's rules prohibit altering an image by adding, rearranging, reversing, distorting or removing people or objects within the frame, and require that all entered photographs be made with a camera; use of generative artificial-intelligence tools results in automatic disqualification.

== World Press Photo of the Year ==
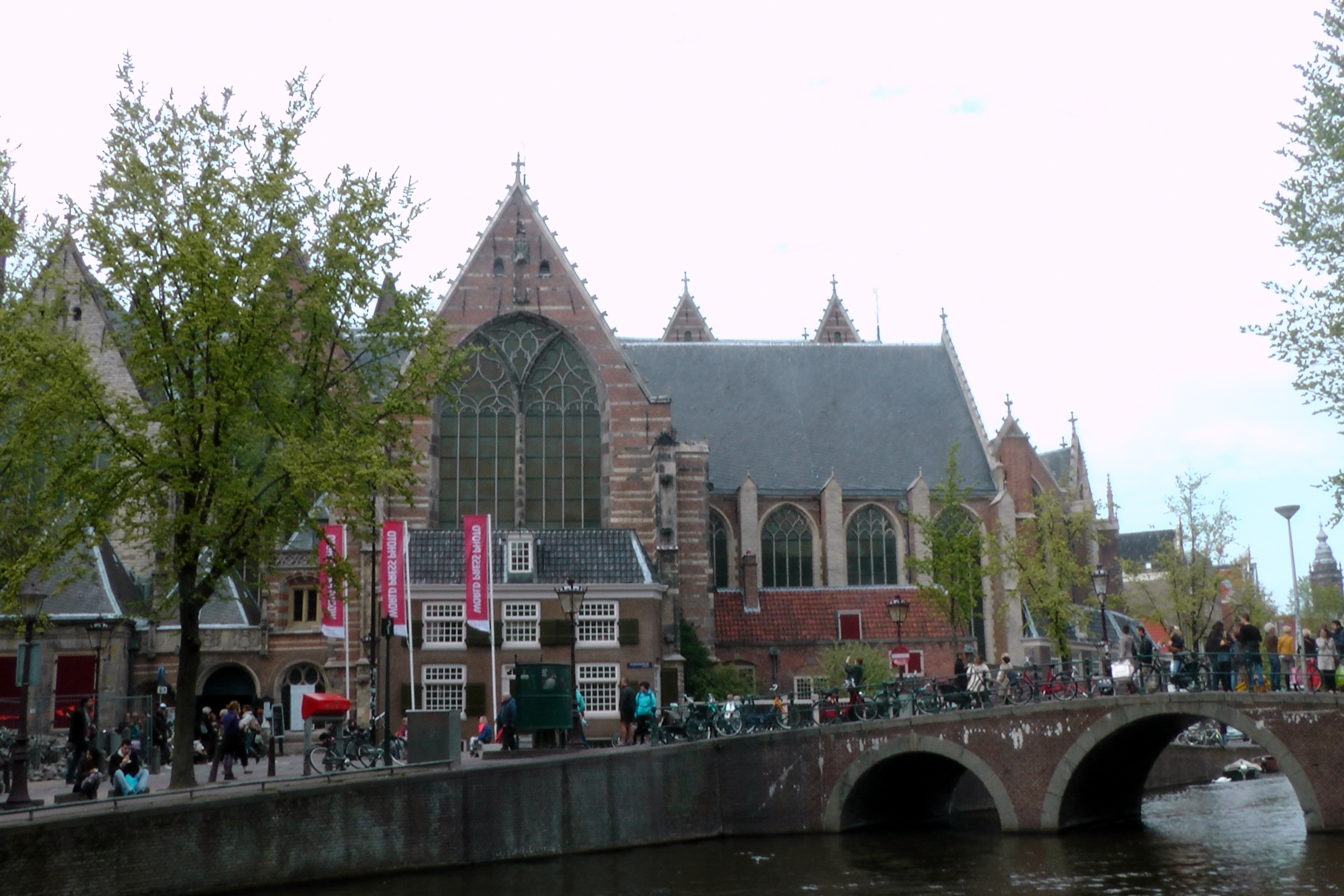
World Press Photo Exhibition in Amsterdam, May 2013

Each year's contest selects a single World Press Photo of the Year from among the category winners. Past winners have included Spencer Platt of Getty Images in 2006, for an image of young Lebanese driving through a Beirut neighbourhood devastated by Israeli bombing; Tim Hetherington in 2007; and Anthony Suau in 2008, his second win after 1987. More recent winners have included Mads Nissen (2014 and 2021), Ronaldo Schemidt (2018), John Moore (2019), Amber Bracken (2022) for an image commemorating Indigenous children who died at Kamloops Indian Residential School, Evgeniy Maloletka (2023) for the aftermath of the Mariupol maternity hospital airstrike, Mohammed Salem (2024), and Samar Abu Elouf (2025), whose portrait of nine-year-old Mahmoud Ajjour, wounded in an Israeli airstrike in Gaza City, was named winner by a jury chaired by Lucy Conticello, director of photography at M, Le magazine du Monde. The 2026 Photo of the Year, announced on 23 April 2026 under a global jury chaired by Kira Pollack, was Separated by ICE by Carol Guzy for ZUMA Press and the Miami Herald, showing a father detained by U.S. immigration agents in New York City while his daughters clung to him.

== Exhibitions ==
The exhibition in 2026 at the Marche Bonsecours in Montreal, Canada.

The prizewinning photographs from each contest are assembled into a travelling exhibition. In the years before the COVID-19 pandemic it was shown at around 100 venues in 45 countries to a combined annual audience of roughly four million visitors; the foundation has more recently described the exhibition as reaching millions of people at more than 80 locations each year. Since 2019, the flagship exhibition has been held at De Nieuwe Kerk in Amsterdam, under a five-year partnership announced in 2021; the ceremony and exhibition were previously associated with the Oude Kerk. In November 2017, the foundation held its largest US exhibition to that date, at Washington, D.C.'s Dupont Underground art space. In October 2023, World Press Photo partnered with Magnum Photos on a joint "Square Print Sale," titled Written by Light, pairing 31 contest winners with more than 75 Magnum photographers to sell over 100 signed prints; the organizations said the sale was conceived to spotlight photography made with a camera at a moment when the contest was also debating the admissibility of AI-generated images.

== Education and development programs ==
=== Joop Swart Masterclass ===
Since 1994, World Press Photo has organised the Joop Swart Masterclass, named for Joop Swart, who chaired the contest jury from 1966 to 1974 and served on the foundation's board from 1970 until his death in 1994. Held in Amsterdam, the programme brings together twelve early-career photojournalists selected to work with mentors on projects addressing "profound social, political, and cultural" subjects. The 2018 edition was the masterclass's 25th; the 2020 edition, themed "Reset," was held online because of the COVID-19 pandemic. Tim Hetherington was a participant in the 2002 class.

=== 6x6 Global Talent Program ===
Launched in 2018, the 6x6 Global Talent Program recognises six visual storytellers in each of six world regions per cycle. By 2020 the programme had completed a first cycle of 36 photographers and begun a second; several 6x6 participants have gone on to take part in the Joop Swart Masterclass or to win World Press Photo Contest prizes.

=== Other programs ===
World Press Photo created the African Photojournalism Database in 2016 with Everyday Africa to connect African photographers with the international media economy; by 2020 more than 500 visual storytellers were listed in the database. The foundation also runs the West Africa Visual Journalism Fellowship, a one-year fellowship for three emerging journalists. From 2011 to 2014, World Press Photo and Human Rights Watch jointly awarded the Tim Hetherington Grant, an annual €20,000 grant in memory of photojournalist Tim Hetherington to complete an existing human-rights project; winners included Stephen Ferry (2011), Fernando Moleres (2012), Olivier Jobard (2013), and William Daniels (2014). The grant was succeeded by the Tim Hetherington Fellowship.

== Research and publications ==
Between 2015 and 2018 the foundation co-produced The State of News Photography, a survey of the working lives of professional photojournalists conducted with the University of Stirling and the Reuters Institute for the Study of Journalism at the University of Oxford. The first edition drew responses from photographers who had entered the 2015 contest and examined working conditions, pay, technology use, security and professional ethics. Three editions were published, in 2015, 2016 and 2018; the authors of the final report cautioned that because respondents were drawn from contest entrants, the data should not be taken as representative of the profession as a whole. A related analysis of gender in professional photojournalism, drawing on the same survey data, found that women photojournalists faced more demanding working circumstances than their male counterparts despite comparable levels of training. The organization also publishes an annual technical report on the contest covering diversity, representation and verification data.

== Controversies ==
- 2011 – Beirut exhibition censorship. Amit Sha'al of Israel won third prize in the Arts and Entertainment: Stories category. During an exhibition in Lebanon that year, World Press Photo was asked to remove Sha'al's photographs because, according to the General Security Directorate, Lebanon and Israel were "in a state of war." WPP refused to remove the work and closed the exhibition ten days ahead of schedule; project manager Erik de Kruijf said, "We cannot allow censorship of any kind so that's why we decided to take everything down."
- 2010 – Stepan Rudik disqualification. Third-prize winner Stepan Rudik was disqualified from the Sports Features category after RAW files showed he had digitally removed part of a foot in the background of one image; it was the first year photographers were required to submit RAW files on suspicion of manipulation. Managing director Michiel Munneke said the foundation had found it "imperative to disqualify the photographer from the contest," since "the principle of World Press Photo is to promote high standards in photojournalism."
- 2013 – Gaza Burial manipulation dispute. The 2013 World Press Photo of the Year, Gaza Burial by Swedish photographer Paul Hansen for Dagens Nyheter, was alleged by forensic image analyst Neal Krawetz — amplified by the technology site ExtremeTech — to be a composite of three separate frames. Hansen denied the photograph was a composite, describing his process as developing the raw file at different densities to balance uneven light rather than dodging and burning. An independent forensic examination commissioned by World Press Photo, led by Dartmouth College computer scientist Hany Farid and Kevin Connor of Fourandsix Technologies, found the published image had been retouched for global and local colour and tone but reported no evidence of significant manipulation or compositing, and characterized the manipulation allegation as flawed.
- 2015 – mass disqualifications and the Troilo case. The 2015 contest produced the most serious integrity crisis in the organization's history: around 20 per cent of entries reaching the penultimate round were rejected after independent experts identified manipulation or heavy post-processing, more than double the roughly 8 per cent rejected the previous year. The Sports Stories category was affected badly enough that the jury awarded only two prizes instead of the customary three. Separately, the first prize in Contemporary Issues (Stories), awarded to Italian photographer Giovanni Troilo for La Ville Noire — The Dark Heart of Europe, a series on the Belgian city of Charleroi, was revoked in March 2015 after Charleroi's mayor, Paul Magnette, disputed the series' portrayal of the city and alleged staged images; World Press Photo disqualified the series after Troilo confirmed one photograph had actually been taken in Molenbeek, Brussels. Managing director Lars Boering said the case involved clearly misleading information that changed how the story was perceived; the second- and third-place stories were promoted accordingly and no third prize was awarded. Following the contest, the foundation introduced a code of ethics, acknowledging its criteria and guidance to entrants had not been sufficiently clear; the disqualification rate fell to 16 per cent of finalists the following year.
- 2023 – reversal of generative-AI rule. In November 2023, World Press Photo announced that AI-generated images would be admissible in the Open Format category of its 2024 contest. The decision drew immediate opposition from photojournalists, and within days the organization reversed it, prohibiting both fully generated images and generative fill across all categories.
- 2023 – Budapest exhibition censorship. In October 2023, the Hungarian government barred visitors under eighteen from the World Press Photo exhibition at the Hungarian National Museum in Budapest, after a complaint from a far-right member of parliament led the culture ministry to find that five photographs breached a Hungarian law restricting the display of LGBTQ content to minors. The affected images formed part of Home for the Golden Gays by Filipino photojournalist Hannah Reyes Morales, documenting a community of elderly LGBTQ people in the Philippines. El Zein Khoury described the restriction as the first instance of censorship faced by one of the organization's exhibitions in Europe.
- 2025 – Tbilisi jury controversy. Georgian photojournalists protested in an open letter in March 2025 after a photographer working for the Kremlin-funded news agency TASS won a World Press Photo award for coverage of anti-Russian demonstrations in Tbilisi. World Press Photo responded that photographs are judged anonymously and that it does not exclude photographers from any country, "even photographers working in places with little press freedom."
- 2025–present – attribution dispute over The Terror of War. The authorship of The Terror of War, the 1972 photograph of nine-year-old Phan Thị Kim Phúc fleeing a napalm attack at Trảng Bàng and World Press Photo of the Year for 1973, has been in dispute since 2025. It had been credited since it was taken to Associated Press photographer Nick Ut. That attribution was challenged by The Stringer, a documentary produced by the VII Foundation and directed by Bao Nguyen, which premiered at the Sundance Film Festival in January 2025 and argued the photograph was more likely taken by Nguyễn Thành Nghệ, a freelance driver working during the war. World Press Photo opened its own investigation and, on 16 May 2025, suspended the attribution to Ut. Its report concluded that analysis of location, distance and the camera likely used indicated Nguyễn Thành Nghệ or Huỳnh Công Phúc may have been better positioned to take the photograph, but that no evidence pointed conclusively to any one author. El Zein Khoury said the level of doubt was too significant to maintain the existing attribution while also being insufficient to reassign it; the organization stated the award itself stands and that Ut would not be asked to return his prize, with only the authorship under review. The Associated Press, which owns the image, conducted two separate investigations and said it had not found the definitive evidence its standards require to change the credit. After The Stringer was released on Netflix in November 2025, Ut filed a criminal defamation complaint in France in March 2026 against Netflix France and Gary Knight of the VII Foundation under French press law, seeking €100,000 in damages and €20,000 in costs; a trial was subsequently scheduled in Tarascon for February–March 2027.

== Criticism and academic study ==
The contest has been used repeatedly as a dataset for research into international photojournalism. A 2021 study by Rosanna Planer in the journal Journalism and Media analysed all photographs shown in the competition between 1960 and 2020, together with the national origins of jury members and entrants, and found that Africa, Asia and South America were significantly more likely than Australia, Europe and North America to be represented through conflict and through images the authors coded as negative, describing a "dominant Eurocentric view" in the contest's history. Earlier German-language scholarship by Alexander Godulla examined the thematic structure of contest-winning images from 1955 to 2006 and the power structures behind selection of the Photo of the Year.

Journalist Nina Berman, writing in the Columbia Journalism Review in 2015, was critical of the contest's judging culture, calling World Press Photo "one of the profession's most prestigious awards organizations" while questioning the standards by which its juries select winning images, and contrasting the contest with festival-format events such as Visa pour l'Image. A separate 2020 analysis by media scholar Marco Solaroli situated the contest within the broader field of photojournalism prizing, drawing on roughly two decades of archival material and interviews with jurors and winners. The United Nations independently used similar language in 2007, describing World Press Photo as organizing "the world's largest and most prestigious annual press photography contest."

== See also ==
- Zilveren Camera
- Pulitzer Prize for Photography
- Sony World Photography Awards
- Visa pour l'Image
- The Terror of War
- List of photography awards
