= Dana Stone =

American photojournalist (b. 1939– missing 1970)

- Stone (right) and Sean Flynn (left), riding motorcycles into Communist-held territory in Cambodia on April 6, 1970 – the day they disappeared
- Born: Dana Hazen Stone; April 18, 1939; Pomfret, Vermont, U.S.
- Disappeared: April 6, 1970 (aged 30); Highway One, Cambodia
- Status: Declared dead in absentia
- Spouse: Louise Smizer

Dana Hazen Stone (April 18, 1939; disappeared April 6, 1970) was an American photojournalist who worked for CBS, United Press International, and Associated Press during the Vietnam War.

== Biography ==
Stone first traveled to Vietnam in 1965. Before arriving he bought a Nikon, his first camera, in Hong Kong. After arriving in Saigon he met Henri Huet who showed him how to load film into the camera. He befriended fellow photographers and journalists including Sean Flynn, Tim Page, Henri Huet, John Steinbeck IV, Perry Deane Young, Nik Wheeler, Chas Gerretsen, John Olson and others. Dana started freelancing for UPI and later became a staffer with the AP. He soon became a combat photographer of note while going on missions with the Green Berets from his base in Da Nang.

He and his wife Louise Smizer left Saigon for Europe in 1969, driving a VW Camper from India overland to Lapland in Sweden where, for a short time, he became a lumberjack.

Stone was working as a freelancer for CBS News in Laos when he was called back to Saigon in March 1970 to work as a combat cameraman with John Laurence who was making a documentary that would become The World of Charlie Company. He spent 5 days working on the documentary before being sent by CBS to Phnom Penh on March 28 to cover the aftermath of the Cambodian coup.

== Disappearance ==
On April 6, 1970, a group of journalists left Phnom Penh to attend a government-sponsored press conference in Saigon. Stone (who was on assignment for CBS) and fellow photojournalist Sean Flynn (who was freelancing) chose to travel on motorcycles instead of the limousines that the majority of the other journalists were using for traveling.

Reporter Steve Bell, who was one of the last Westerners to see the two alive, later said that after the press conference, Flynn and Stone had received word that there was a makeshift checkpoint on Highway 1 manned by members of the Viet Cong. The checkpoint consisted of a white four-door sedan in which several missing journalists had been traveling, and which was now parked across the roadway. Flynn and Stone observed the checkpoint from some distance and spoke to several journalists already on scene. Surviving film footage captured both this moment as well as the sight of several people, believed to be Viet Cong, moving around on the far side of the vehicle.

Undaunted by the sight of a nearby platoon of government soldiers taking up defensive positions in a line perpendicular to the road, and eager to interview the Viet Cong, both Flynn and Stone chose to proceed alone to the checkpoint. Witnesses later reported that both Flynn and Stone were quickly relieved of their motorcycles, and marched into a nearby treeline. Neither was ever seen alive again. Before they left, Bell snapped the last known photo taken of Flynn and Stone.

Four other journalists, two Frenchmen and two Japanese, had been captured by the Viet Cong inside Cambodia on the same day. By June 1970, 25 journalists had been captured in Cambodia in the previous three weeks. Three had been killed, some returned, and others were missing. Flynn and Stone were never seen again and their bodies have never been found.

=== Later events ===
Investigations by fellow photojournalist Tim Page, reported in various U.K. and U.S. newspapers in 1991, indicate that Stone and Flynn were taken first to the village of Sangke Kaong, and then to other villages before being handed to the Khmer Rouge, who later executed them. Page tracked down an almost-empty grave in a village in Kampong Cham province in which two foreigners allegedly had been buried. Interviews with villagers suggested they belonged to a tall man and a short man—consistent with the appearance of Flynn and Stone, respectively. However, in 2003, the U.S. military's Central Identification Lab in Hawaii confirmed by DNA testing that the remains found by Tim Page were actually those of Clyde McKay, a merchant marine crew member and mutineer during the SS Columbia Eagle incident.

The duo's disappearance is chronicled in journalist Perry Deane Young's 1975 memoir, Two of the Missing. A 1991 film, Danger on the Edge of Town, recounted photographer Tim Page's decade's-long search to discover the fate of his friends Flynn and Stone.

Stone's younger brother, John Thomas Stone, joined the U.S. Army in 1971, soon after graduating from high school, reportedly due in part to a desire to discover what had happened to his brother. He later served as a medic in the Vermont National Guard and was killed by friendly fire on March 29, 2006, when the 52-year-old sergeant was on his third tour in the war in Afghanistan.

== See also ==
- Declared death in absentia
- John Dawson Dewhirst
- List of journalists killed and missing in the Vietnam War
- List of people who disappeared mysteriously: post-1970
- Mayaguez Incident
