= John Laurence =

American television correspondent, author, print reporter and documentary filmmaker

John (Jack) Laurence
- Born: Fairfield, Connecticut
- Occupations: TV news correspondent, author, print reporter, documentary filmmaker.
- Notable work: The World of Charlie Company (1970); The Cat from Huế: a Vietnam War Story (2002); I am an American Soldier: One Year in Iraq with the 101st Airborne (2007)

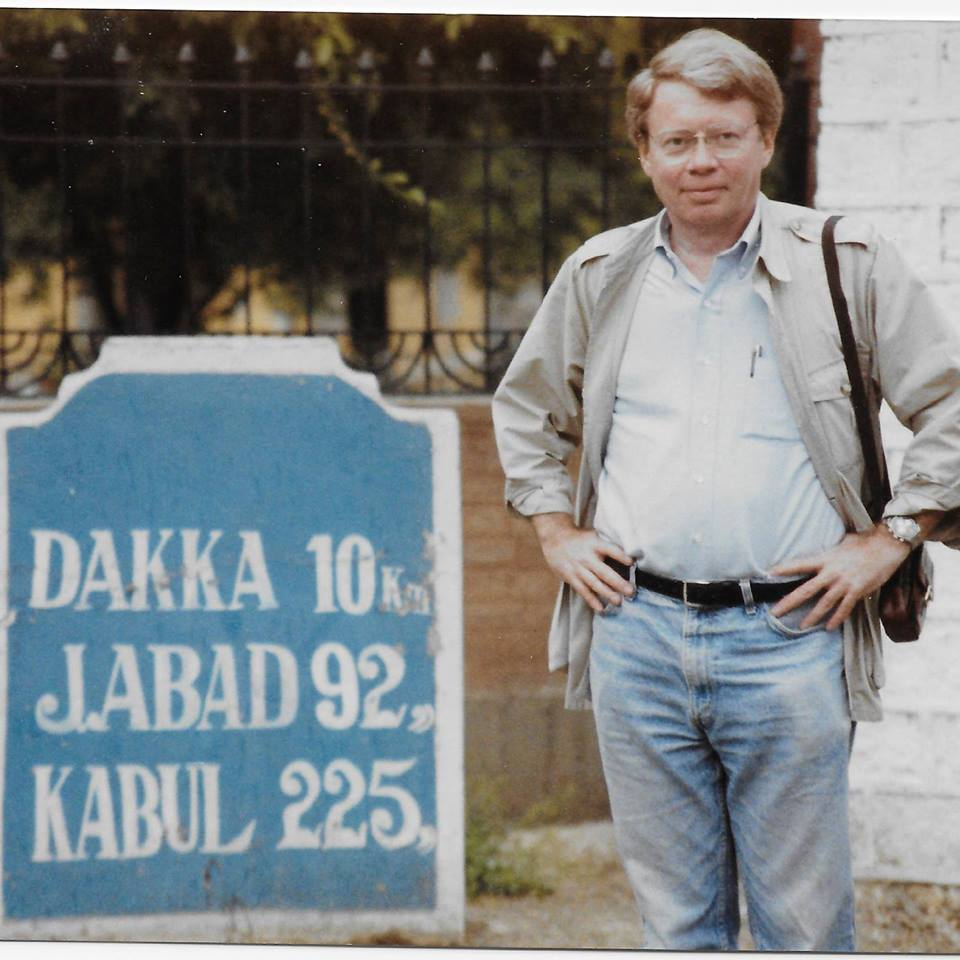
Laurence covered the Russian War in Afghanistan.

John Laurence (also known as Jack Laurence) (born January 01, 1940) is an American television correspondent, author, print reporter and documentary filmmaker. He is known for his work on the air at CBS News, London correspondent for ABC News, documentary work for PBS and CBS, and his book and magazine writing. He won the George Polk Memorial Award of the Overseas Press Club of America for "best reporting in any medium requiring exceptional courage and enterprise abroad" for his coverage of the Vietnam War in 1970. In 2003, he was described in Esquire Magazine as "the best war correspondent of his generation."

== Life and career ==
Laurence attended Fairfield College Preparatory School and then Rensselaer Polytechnic Institute before transferring to the University of Pennsylvania. While at the University of Pennsylvania, he started working at the campus radio station, WXPN which led to his career in broadcast journalism. He worked at WWDC (AM/FM) in Washington D.C. for a year and then at WNEW-AM/FM in New York from 1962 to 1964. He joined CBS News as a radio correspondent in January, 1965. He covered the U.S. intervention in the Dominican Civil War in April–May 1965 where he produced a radio documentary on the revolution.

=== Vietnam War ===
Laurence volunteered to go to South Vietnam in August 1965 as a radio reporter. An American camera crew, Jim Wilson and Bob Funk, was available, so Laurence started reporting for TV, beginning with an exclusive report on the arrival of the 1st Cavalry Division's advance party in South Vietnam. He covered Operation Piranha, the Battle of An Ninh, the Siege of Plei Me, the aftermath of the Battle of Ia Drang, and Operation Masher among other stories.

In December, 1965, Laurence was promoted from reporter to correspondent by Fred W. Friendly, the president of CBS News. This made him the youngest news correspondent in CBS News history. He had just become 26 years old.

Laurence was initially supportive of U.S. policy in Vietnam and gave favorable if neutral coverage in what was referred to by the U.S. Army public information officers as "being with the program". However, as he saw more and more of the war, witnessing the deaths of American GIs and Vietnamese civilians, the accidental bombing of a village in neutral Cambodia, coming under fire from friendly forces, and seeing the corruption endemic in South Vietnam, he became more critical of the U.S. presence and what might actually be achieved there.

Through his friendship with UPI photojournalist Steve Northup, Laurence became a regular visitor at 47 Bui Thi Xuan, Saigon, the home of Northup and fellow correspondents Tim Page, Martin Stuart-Fox, David Stuart-Fox, Simon Dring, Joseph Galloway, and later Sean Flynn. It was known as "Frankie's House" after the resident Vietnamese houseboy. Frankie's House became a social club for a small group of young correspondents and their friends who talked, listened to music and smoked marijuana between field assignments.

On 10 March 1966, following the Battle of A Sau, Laurence interviewed Marine Lieutenant colonel Charles House, commander of HMM-163, the helicopter squadron which had evacuated the survivors of the battle and who had himself been shot down and taken command of U.S. and Vietnamese forces. House stated that CIDG troops had panicked while trying to board the evacuation helicopters and overloaded them. The crews and Special Forces troops opened fire on the Vietnamese soldiers to restore order. The story caused controversy when broadcast and was investigated by Military Assistance Command, Vietnam (MACV) and III MAF, but no further action was taken other than a reprimand of Laurance and newspaper reporter Jim Lucas.

On 22 May 1966, Laurence's friend and Frankie's House regular, Sam Castan, a LOOK magazine correspondent, was killed during a North Vietnamese attack at Landing Zone Hereford, where an American platoon was overrun and all but four of its members killed. Castan was awarded the Army Commendation medal for helping to rescue a few of the U.S. survivors. Later, at a formal ceremony in New York, the medal was handed to Castan's widow by the commander of U.S. forces in Vietnam, General William Westmoreland. It was considered at the time to be the most courageous act of saving American lives by a civilian reporter. Laurence wrote Castan's obituary for LOOK.

Laurence left Vietnam in late May, 1966, returning to the U.S. and working out of CBS bureaus in New York, Chicago, Los Angeles and Atlanta. He covered racial/police violence in Cleveland, Ohio in 1966, the civil rights movement in the South and other domestic stories in the United States.

Laurence returned to Vietnam in August 1967. He covered the Battle of Dak To, the Tet Offensive, the siege of Con Thien, the Battle of Khe Sanh, the Battle of Hue, corruption among the Vietnamese, and the plight of South Vietnamese civilians among other combat stories. With cameraman Keith Kay, they were the first TV crew to report on the siege of Con Thien in September, 1967. Kay and Laurence received a cable from Walter Cronkite congratulating them on their work.

In February 1968, Laurence and Kay were among the first reporters to reach the city of Huế on the third day of the battle. Laurence had dinner with Walter Cronkite the night before the CBS anchorman returned to the U.S. following his two week tour of Vietnam to study the aftermath of the Tet Offensive. He tried to impress on Cronkite his belief that the war had reached a stalemate and that America was wasting the lives of its own troops and those of the Vietnamese people by continuing the war. Soon after, Cronkite broadcast a special report on CBS calling for negotiations to end the war.

Laurence reported the 1968 documentary "Hill 943", an hour-long special report on CBS News, recounting the lives (and death) of Company A, 3rd Battalion, 12th Infantry Regiment, 4th Infantry Division trying to capture Hill 943 during the Battle of Dak To. "The grim and unpublicized routine of the war in Vietnam—the dangerous assignment of an American company to penetrate the jungle and take Hill 943—was related with unusual intimacy in last night's news special of the Columbia Broadcasting System," New York Times TV reviewer Jack Gould wrote.

Laurence's second tour in Vietnam ended in May 1968. Based in New York, he covered racial violence in Chicago, Detroit, Newark, Kansas City and San Francisco.

Sigma Delta Chi, the U.S. professional journalism society, made its television reporting award for Distinguished Service in Journalism to Laurence for his coverage of the Vietnam war in 1967. Laurence received an Emmy Award from the Academy of Television Arts and Sciences for his 1968 series of investigative reports called "Police After Chicago" on the CBS Evening News.

In 1969, Laurence reported a one-hour documentary on what had become known in the United States as the Generation Gap, the difference in attitudes between young people and their parents. "People are so much more interesting than statistics, a fact demonstrated once again last night on the Columbia Broadcasting System's superb television study of the generation gap, "Fathers and Sons" wrote George Gent in the New York Times.

In March, 1970, Laurence returned to Vietnam to produce and report a documentary called The World of Charlie Company. Along with his cameraman, Keith Kay, and sound technician, James Clevenger, they spent four months recording the daily lives and experiences of Company C, 2nd Battalion, 7th Cavalry Regiment, in Tây Ninh Province in War Zone C near the Cambodian border. They lived, ate and patrolled with the troops while sending news reports for the CBS Evening News. In April 1970, Laurence accompanied C Company as it conducted a helicopter assault into Memot District at the start of the Cambodian Campaign, attempting to engage the North Vietnamese military headquarters known as COSVN. For his work, Laurence received a Columbia duPont Silver Baton award (the first of three), another Emmy (of eleven overall), and the George Polk Memorial award from the Overseas Press Club of America.

=== 1970–2006 ===
In 1970, Laurence moved to London to take over as bureau chief from Morley Safer. He and Keith Kay covered the Indo-Pakistani War of 1971 from East Pakistan. As a London-based correspondent, he covered the conflict in Northern Ireland for the next 20 years. He covered the October War (Yom Kippur War) between Syria, Egypt and Israel in 1973. In 1974, he covered the wars in Cyprus, Rhodesia and Ethiopia and the continuing artillery, air force and terrorist incidents between Syria, Lebanon and Israel. Other wars and revolutions he covered in the 1970s, 80s and 90s included Portugal, Angola, Lebanon, Iceland, Afghanistan, South Africa and Yugoslavia. He covered the first Gulf War in 1990–91 and reported from Kuwait for a month after the war for ABC News Nightline. In 2003, Laurence accompanied a rifle company from the 101st Airborne Division (Air Assault) into Iraq at the start of the Iraq War. He returned to Iraq with the same rifle company to make a documentary and was embedded with it for 16 months in 2005–06. The film was called, "I Am an American Soldier".

In 1977, Laurence left CBS News and began working on his book, "The Cat from Hue: a Vietnam War Story". In 1978, he joined ABC News as a London correspondent at a time when its new president, Roone Arledge, was building the TV news division to make it more competitive with CBS and NBC.

In July 1982 Laurence returned briefly to Vietnam for the first time since 1970.

Laurence's memoir of his years covering the war in Vietnam, The Cat from Hue: a Vietnam War Story, was published in 2002 by PublicAffairs Press in New York. It received positive reviews in The New York Times and in other major U.S. newspapers and magazines. The book received the Cornelius Ryan Award from the Overseas Press Club, its sole annual book award, for "Best Non-Fiction Reporting on International Affairs".

The documentary film Laurence produced and directed, "I am an American Soldier" was shown at film festivals in New York, Orlando and Traverse City, Michigan in 2007. It received a Founder's Award at Traverse City given by Michael Moore, and a Certificate of Appreciation from the 10th Mountain Division at its base in Louisiana for a screening of the film for troops about to embark for a year in Iraq.
