= Perry Deane Young =

American writer (1941–2019)

- Born: March 27, 1941; Woodfin, North Carolina, U.S.
- Died: January 1, 2019 (aged 77); Chapel Hill, North Carolina, U.S.
- Education: University of North Carolina at Chapel Hill
- Occupation: Writer
- Writing career
- Period: 1967–2018
- Genre: Non-fiction
- Website: www.authorperrydeaneyoung.com

Perry Deane Young (March 27, 1941 – January 1, 2019) was a journalist, author, playwright, historian, and professional gardener. He was the author of Two of the Missing, about fellow journalists Sean Flynn and Dana Stone, who went missing during the Vietnam War and whose fates remain unknown, and the co-author of The David Kopay Story, a biography of 1970's professional football player David Kopay, who revealed in 1975 that he was gay.

== Early life ==
Young was born on March 27, 1941, in Woodfin, North Carolina, near Asheville, the youngest of 13 children. His mother was Rheba Maphry Tipton Young. His father, Robert, died in 1958. He edited his high school newspaper and earned a scholarship to University of North Carolina at Chapel Hill in 1959. He graduated in 1994.

== Career ==
Dropping out of UNC, Young worked for several newspapers, including the Durham Morning Herald, the Raleigh News & Observer and the Chapel Hill Weekly. In 1963, he covered the N.C. General Assembly for UPI. He also worked as part of Richardson Preyer's unsuccessful gubernatorial campaign in 1964, and joined the Army Reserves in 1966. He then went to work for United Press International in 1967.

Young took an assignment with UPI in Vietnam, arriving in Saigon on January 29, 1968, and his first story was about the Tet Offensive, which began later that night. While covering the war, he roomed with fellow journalists Tim Page, Sean Flynn, and Nik Wheeler. He left after witnessing the near-fatal injuries to Page. In 1975, his book Two of the Missing was published. The memoir was based on a magazine article of the same name that Young wrote in Harper's Magazine in December 1972, with the intention of later writing a book about the disappearance of Flynn and Stone. He had met and worked with them in Vietnam covering the war, and they went missing after Young had left.

After reading of the American football player Dave Kopay's post-retirement revelation of being gay, Young offered to help Kopay write a book. The offer was accepted, and in 1977, the book appeared on the New York Times Best Seller list. For a time, Young and Kopay lived together in Washington, D.C.

A Killing Cure, about Evelyn Walker's malpractice suit against psychiatrist Zane Parzen, was published in 1982. In a 1998 profile, Young revealed that "[the] book made no money at all, and it was a disaster."

He was a columnist for The Chapel Hill Herald from 1996 to 2003.

In addition to the books, Young penned three plays with William Gregg. All three were produced by the Southern Appalachian Repertory Theatre: Frankie in 2001; Mountain of Hope in 2004; Home Again, 2009.

== Personal ==
Young long acknowledged that he was gay, writing candidly about it in Two of the Missing, and authored or co-authored books with gay-related themes, including The David Kopay Story and Lesbians and Gays and Sports. He lived in the basement of a non-profit counseling and support group in Chapel Hill, North Carolina, working around the building in lieu of rent, from 1993 until his death.

Young died from cancer on January 1, 2019, aged 77.

== Published works ==
=== Books ===
- Two of the Missing: Remembering Sean Flynn and Dana Stone. Coward, McCann & Geoghegan. 1975. ISBN 978-0698106024.
- Hanged by a Dream. iUniverse. 2005. ISBN 0-595-80734-8.
- Our Young Family. Overmountain Press. 2003. ISBN 1-57072-274-9.
- The David Kopay Story. Advocate Books. 2001. ISBN 978-1-55583-638-2. (with David Kopay; originally published in 1977)
- The Untold Story of Frankie Silver. Down Home Press. 1998. ISBN 0-595-37725-4. (reissued 2005 by iUniverse)
- Lesbians and Gays and Sports. Chelsea House. 1994. p. 196. ISBN 978-0-7910-2951-0.
- A Killing Cure. Henry Holt and Company. 1986. ISBN 0-03-069906-1. (with Evelyn Walker)
- God's Bullies; Native Reflections on Preachers and Politics. Holt, Rinehart and Winston. 1982. ISBN 0-03-059706-4.

=== Plays ===
- Frankie, Southern Appalachian Repertory Theatre August 2001 (with William Gregg)
- Mountain of Hope, SART, July 7, 2004 (with William Gregg)
- Home Again, July 29, 2009 (with William Gregg)
