= Robert Capa Gold Medal =

Photography award

The Robert Capa Gold Medal is an award for "best published photographic reporting from abroad requiring exceptional courage and enterprise". It is awarded annually by the Overseas Press Club of America (OPC). It was created in honor of the war photographer Robert Capa. The first Robert Capa Gold Medal was awarded in 1955 to Howard Sochurek.

== Winners ==
Year	Recipient	OPC	Awarded For	Organization
1955	Howard Sochurek	17	Coverage of North Vietnam	Magnum for Life
1956	John Sadovy	18	Hungarian Revolution	Life
1957	no award	19		
1958	Paul Bruck	20	"Coverage of Lebanon"	CBS News
1959	Mario Biasetti	21	"Recording the Nicaragua revolt from both sides at great risk"	CBS News
1960	Yung Su Kwon	22	"Coverage of Japanese riots at the time of James Hagerty's arrival"	NBC News
1961	no award	23		
1962	Peter Dehmel and Klaus Dehmel	24	"The Tunnel"	NBC News
1963	Larry Burrows	25	"Jungle War in Vietnam"	Life
1964	Horst Faas	26	Coverage of Vietnam	Associated Press
1965	Larry Burrows	27	"With a Brave Crew in a Deadly Flight"	Life
1966	Henri Huet	28	Vietnam	Associated Press
1967	David Douglas Duncan	29	"Inside the Cone of Fire - Con Thien, Vietnam"	Life and ABC News
1968	John Olson	30	"The Battle That Regained and Ruined Huế"	Life
1969	Anonymous Czech photographer (Later revealed to be Josef Koudelka)	31	"From A Death to Remember"	Look
1970	Kyoichi Sawada	32	"Coverage of war in Cambodia"	United Press International
1971	Larry Burrows	33	"Coverage of war in Laotian war zone"	Life
1972	Clive W. Limpkin	34	"Battle of Bogside"	Penguin Books
1973	David Burnett, Raymond Depardon, and Chas Gerretsen	35	"Chile"	Gamma Presse Images
1974	W. Eugene Smith	36	"Minamata, Japan: Life - Sacred and Profane"	Camera 35
1975	Dirck Halstead	37	Coverage of Vietnam	Time
1976	Catherine Leroy	38	Coverage of street fighting in Beirut.	Gamma for Time
1977	Eddie Adams	39	"The Boat of No Smiles"	The Associated Press
1978	Susan Meiselas	40	Nicaraguan Revolution	Time
1979	Kaveh Golestan	41	"Coverage of the Iranian Revolution"	Time
1980	Steve McCurry	42	"Undercover photography of Afghan rebels"	Time
1981	Rudi Frey	43	Coverage in Poland	Time
1982	Harry Mattison	44	"Coverage of guerilla warfare in El Salvador"	Time
1983	James Nachtwey	45	"Lebanon"	Time
1984	James Nachtwey	46	"Photos of El Salvador"	Black Star for Time
1985	Peter Magubane	47	"Cry for Justice: Cry for Peace"	Time
1986	James Nachtwey	48	"Island at War"	Time/GEO (German edition)
1987	Janet Knott	49	"Democracy: What Price?"	The Boston Globe
1988	Chris Steele-Perkins	50	"Graveside Terror"	Magnum for Time Magazine
1989	David Turnley	51	"Revolutions in China and Romania"	Black Star for The Detroit Free Press
1990	Bruce Haley	52	Civil war in Myanmar	Black Star for U.S. News & World Report
1991	Christopher Morris	53	"Slaughter in Vukovar"	Black Star for Time
1992	Luc Delahaye	54	"Sarajevo: Life in the War Zone"	Sipa Press
1993	Paul Watson	55	"Mogadishu"	The Toronto Star
1994	James Nachtwey	56	"Election Violence in South Africa"	Magnum for Time Magazine
1995	Anthony Suau	57	"Grozny: Russia's Nightmare"	Time
1996	Corinne Dufka	58	"Liberia: From a Dead Man's Wallet"	Reuters
1997	Horst Faas/Tim Page	59	"Requiem: By the Photographers Who Died in Vietnam and Indochina"	Random House
1998	James Nachtwey	60	"Indonesia: Descent into Madness"	Magnum for Time
1999	John Stanmeyer	61	"The Killing of Bernardino Guterres in Dili, East Timor"	SABA for Time
2000	Chris Anderson	62	"Desperate Passage"	Aurora for The New York Times Magazine,
2001	Luc Delahaye	63	"Afghanistan"	Magnum for Newsweek
2002	Carolyn Cole	64	"Church of the Nativity: In the Center of the Siege"	The Los Angeles Times
2003	Carolyn Cole	65	"Covering Conflict: Iraq and Liberia"	The Los Angeles Times
2004	Ashley Gilbertson	66	"The Battle for Fallujah"	Aurora for The New York Times
2005	Chris Hondros	67	"One Night In Tal Afar"	Getty Images
2006	Paolo Pellegrin	68	"True Pain: Israel & Hizbullah"	Magnum for Newsweek
2007	John Moore	69	"The Assassination of Benazir Bhutto"	Getty Images for Newsweek
2008	Shaul Schwarz	70	"Kenya: The Wreckage of a Democracy"	Getty Images for Newsweek
2009	Khalil Hamra	71	"War in Gaza"	Associated Press
2010	Agnes Dherbeys	72	Violence Erupts in Thailand	Freelance for The New York Times
2011	André Liohn	73	"Almost Dawn in Libya"	Prospekt Photographers for Newsweek - International Committee of the Red Cross
2012	Fabio Bucciarelli	74	"Battle to Death"	Freelance for AFP
2013	Tyler Hicks	75	"Attack on a Kenyan Mall"	The New York Times
2014	Marcus Bleasdale	76	"Central African Republic Inferno"	Human Rights Watch, National Geographic
2015	Bassam Khabieh	77	"Field Hospital Damascus"	Reuters
2016	Bryan Denton; Sergey Ponomarev	78	"What ISIS Wrought"	The New York Times
2017	Carol Guzy	79	"Scars Of Mosul: The Legacy of ISIS"	Zuma Press
2018	Carolyn Van Houten	80	"The road to Asylum: Inside the migrant caravans"	The Washington Post
2019	Dieu Nalio Chery	81	"Haiti: Nation on the Brink"	Associated Press
2020	Kiana Hayeri	82	"Where Prison Is a Kind of Freedom"	The New York Times Magazine
2021	Anonymous	83	"Myanmar in Turmoil"	Getty Images
2022	Marcus Yam	84	"The First 30 Days of the War in Ukraine"	Los Angeles Times
2023	Samar Abu Elouf	85	"Gaza"	The New York Times
2024	Laura Boushnak and Nariman El-Mofty	86	"Gaza's Injured Children"	The New York Times

== Bibliography ==
- Capa, Robert; Capa, Cornell; Karia, Bhupendra (30 September 1974). Robert Capa, 1913-1954. Vol. 1 of Icp Library of Photographers. Grossman. ISBN 978-0-67060-095-3.
- Chapnick, Howard (1994). Truth Needs No Ally: Inside Photojournalism. University of Missouri. ISBN 978-0-82620-955-9.
- Kershaw, Alex (31 May 2012). Blood & Champagne: The Life and Times of Robert Capa. Pan Macmillan. ISBN 978-0-33049-250-8.
