= Pamela Bellwood =

American actress

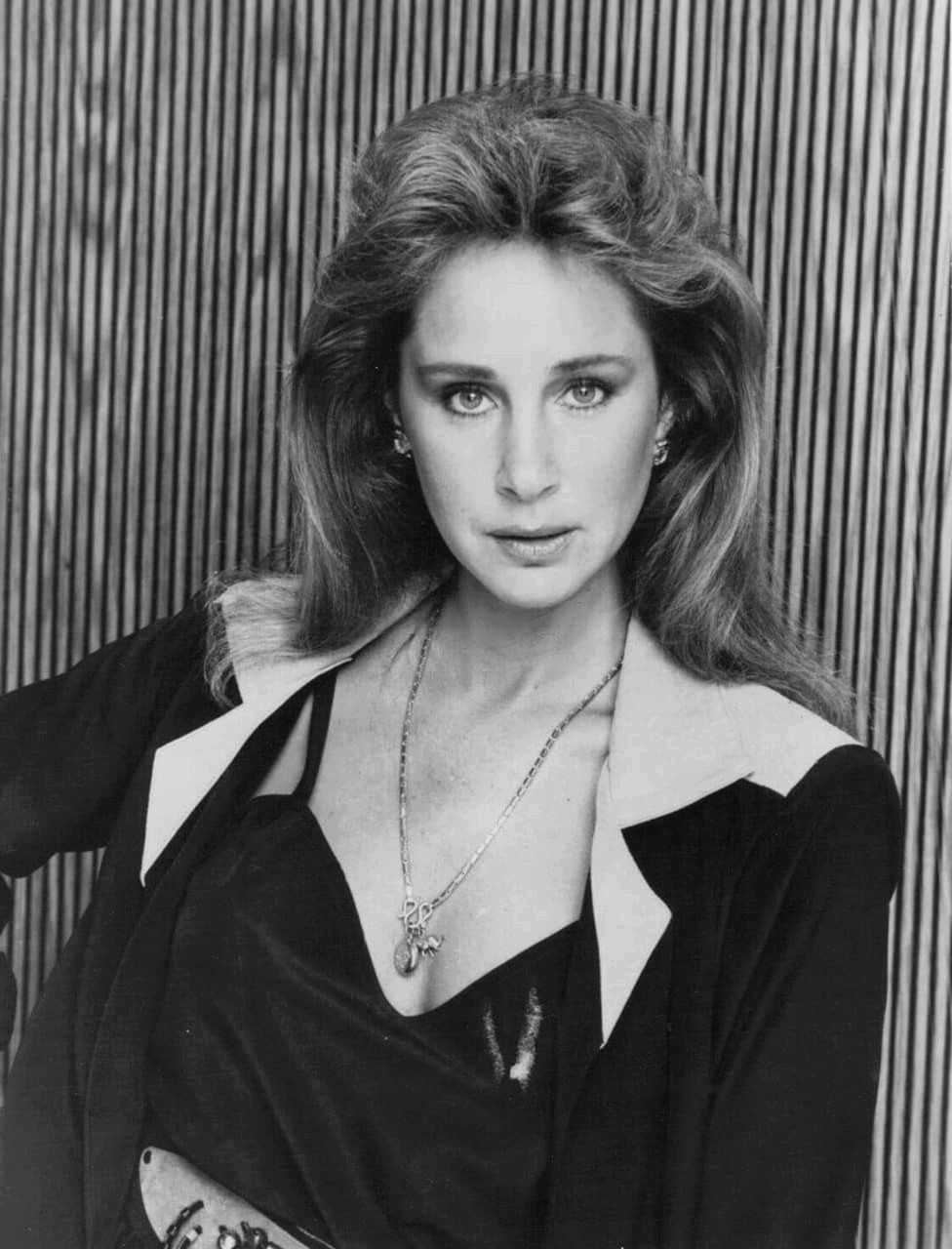
- Bellwood as Claudia Blaisdel Carrington in Dynasty (1983)
- Born: Pamela King; June 26, 1951 (age 75); New York City, New York, U.S.
- Other name: Pamela Bellwood-Wheeler
- Education: Neighborhood Playhouse School of the Theatre
- Occupation: Actress
- Years active: 1974–2005, 2013
- Known for: Dynasty; Butterflies Are Free
- Spouses: Peter Bellwood (m. 1967; div. 1971); Nik Wheeler (m. 1984)
- Children: 2
- Awards: Clarence Derwent Award

Pamela Bellwood (born Pamela King; June 26, 1951) is an American actress known for her role as Claudia Blaisdel Carrington on the 1980s prime time soap opera, Dynasty.

== Life and career ==
Bellwood was born in New York City. She became interested in an acting career when she portrayed Emily in Our Town. She studied acting in New York with Sanford Meisner at the Neighborhood Playhouse, and in London. In 1971, she starred as Jill Tanner in a production of Butterflies Are Free at the Parker Playhouse in Fort Lauderdale, Florida. By 1972, Bellwood was on Broadway, taking over from Blythe Danner as Jill in Butterflies Are Free at the Booth Theatre, and appearing with Barbara Bel Geddes in Finishing Touches. Her performance in Butterflies Are Free earned her a Clarence Derwent Award in 1972.

Early on, Bellwood was credited as Pamela Kingsley because there was already a working actress named Pamela King. In 1974, she appeared in an episode of Paul Sand in Friends and Lovers. Later in 1974, she appeared as Jill Martin in an episode of Rhoda entitled "9-E is available". In 1978, Bellwood played the starring role of TV executive Ellen Cunningham in W.E.B., an NBC drama about a fictional television network. Poor ratings led to the show being cancelled after only five episodes.

In her role of Claudia Blaisdel Carrington, Bellwood was an original cast member of Dynasty in January 1981, and was written out of the series early in the third season, in late 1982. She appeared once in March 1983 to help usher in Jack Coleman as a recast Steven Carrington, and later returned full-time in October 1983. She remained a key character for several seasons until leaving the series a final time in 1986 to become a full-time mother. Twenty years later, in 2006, she appeared with her former Dynasty castmates in the non-fiction special Dynasty Reunion: Catfights & Caviar.

Bellwood posed for an eight-page pictorial in the April 1983 edition of Playboy magazine.

Bellwood also appeared in such films as Two-Minute Warning, Airport '77 and The Incredible Shrinking Woman, as well as a number of TV movies. She continues to perform in film and on stage. She is now known and often credited as Pamela Bellwood-Wheeler.

== Personal life ==
In the early 1970s, Bellwood was married to British writer Peter Bellwood. In 1984, she married photographer Nik Wheeler. They have two sons, Kerry and Christian.

== Filmography ==
=== Film ===
Year	Title	Role	Notes
1976	Two-Minute Warning	Peggy Ramsay	
1977	Airport '77	Lisa Stevens	
1980	Serial	Carol	
1980	Hangar 18	Sarah Michaels	
1981	The Incredible Shrinking Woman	Sandra Dyson	
1988	Cellar Dweller	Amanda	
1997	Le zombie de Cap-Rouge	Patty	
1998	The Gardener	Mrs. Swenson	
1998	Joseph's Gift	Rachel Keller	
2001	Family Secrets		
2005	Going Shopping	Landlady	

=== Television ===
Year	Title	Role	Notes
1970	Mannix	Susan Miller	"Once Upon a Saturday" (season 3, episode 25)
1974	Ironside	Nancy	Episode: "Once More for Joey"
1974	The Wide World of Mystery	Mary	Episode: "The Book of Murder"
1974	Nourish the Beast	Sylvia	TV film
1974	Paul Sand in Friends and Lovers	Joanne	Episode: "Moran's the Man"
1974	Rhoda	Jill Martin	Episode: "9-E Is Available"
1975	Mannix	Miriam	Episode: "Man in a Trap" (season 8, episode 14)
1975	Police Story	Judy Bartlett	Episode: "Sniper"
1975	Matt Helm	Patricia	Episode: "Scavenger's Paradise"
1975	Baretta	Jenny	Episode: "When Dues Come Down"
1975	Cannon	Louise Bishop	Episode: "To Still the Voice"
1976	Insight	Thelma Mann	Episode: "All Out"
1976	The Nancy Walker Show	Darlene Rogers	Episode: "The Homecoming"
1976	The War Widow	Amy	TV film
1977	Serpico	Allison	Episode: "The Party of Your Choice"
1977	Emily, Emily	Emily Ward	TV film
1977	Westside Medical	Melissa Mapes	Episode: "The Witch of Four West"
1977	The Love Boat	Judy Watson	1 episode
1977	Big Hawaii		Episode: "Sarah"
1978	Deadman's Curve	Annie	TV film
1978	Switch	Andrea	Episode: "The Siege at Bouziki Bar"
1978	W.E.B.	Ellen Cunningham	Regular role (5 episodes)
1980	Hagen	Laurie	Episode: "The Straw Man"
1981–1986	Dynasty	Claudia Blaisdel Carrington	Regular role (117 episodes)
1982	The Wild Women of Chastity Gulch	Sarah	TV film
1983	Cocaine: One Man's Seduction	Robin Barstowe	TV film
1983	Baby Sister	Marsha Burroughs	TV film
1983	Sparkling Cyanide	Ruth Lessing	TV film
1983	Choices of the Heart	Sister Dorothy Kazel	TV film
1984	Finder of Lost Loves	Susan Blaine	Episode: "Losing Touch"
1987	Deep Dark Secrets	Anna	TV film
1988	Double Standard	Joan Harik	TV film
1989	The Twilight Zone	Andrea Moffatt	Episode: "Cat and Mouse"
1989	Boon	Rebecca Patterson	Episodes: "All in a Day's Pork", "The Eyes of Texas"
1989	Murder, She Wrote	Vivian Proctor	Episode: "Weave a Tangled Web"
1992	Life Goes On	Future Becca	Episode: "Bec to the Future"
1994	Murder, She Wrote	Vanessa Cross	Episode: "A Murderous Muse"
1997	Women: Stories of Passion	Myra	Episode: "Angel from the Sky"
1997	Heartless	Jennifer Chadway	TV film
2013	Criminal Minds	Wanda Sullivan	Episode: "Pay It Forward"
