= Bruce Haley =

American photographer (born 1957)

Bruce Haley (born 16 January 1957, Alameda, California) is the recipient of the Robert Capa Gold Medal, one of the most prestigious photography awards, for his 1990 coverage of Burma‘s bloody ethnic civil war.

He began his career in 1988, in Afghanistan and went on to photograph areas of conflict in Asia, Africa, Europe and the former Soviet Union. His images of a grisly execution by stabbing in Burma were particularly noteworthy. He wrote for the Baltimore Sun, helping to break the story of the famine in Somalia. Later, he transitioned to non-military subjects.

Haley‘s photographs have appeared worldwide in books, magazines and newspapers, as well as in corporate publications and on CD, video and DVD covers; his clients include Time Life, U.S. News & World Report, The London Sunday Times Magazine, Stern, Paris Match, GEO, Aperture, Georgia-Pacific and the Chevron Corporation. Profiles to Haley and his work, have appeared in American PHOTO, (French) PHOTO and B&W. His portfolio, "13 Million Tons of Pig Iron," was #1 on the Photo-Eye Bestseller List.

Haley‘s exhibition prints have been shown in museums and galleries all over the world.

His published photography books include Sunder (2010), Home Fires Volume 1 (2021) and Home Fires Volume 2 (2022), and Winter (2023).
