= Sean Flynn (photojournalist) =

American photojournalist (b. 1941 - missing 1970)

- Flynn (left) and Dana Stone riding motorcycles into Communist-held territory in Cambodia on April 6, 1970—the day they disappeared
- Born: Sean Leslie Flynn; May 31, 1941; Los Angeles, California, US
- Disappeared: April 6, 1970 (aged 28); Highway One, Cambodia
- Status: Declared presumed dead, 1984
- Education: Duke University
- Occupations: Photojournalist, actor
- Years active: 1956–1970
- Parent(s): Errol Flynn; Lili Damita
- Relatives: Theodore Thomson Flynn (paternal grandfather); Sean Flynn (nephew)

Sean Leslie Flynn (May 31, 1941 – disappeared April 6, 1970; declared legally dead in 1984) was an American actor and freelance photojournalist best known for his coverage of the Vietnam War.

Flynn was the only child of Australian-American actor Errol Flynn and his first wife, French-American actress Lili Damita. After studying briefly at Duke University, he embarked on an acting career. He retired by the mid-1960s to become a freelance photojournalist under contract to Time.

In search of exceptional images, Flynn traveled with US Army Special Forces units and irregulars operating in remote areas. While on assignment in Cambodia in April 1970, Flynn and fellow photojournalist Dana Stone were captured by communist guerrillas. Neither man was seen or heard from again. In 1984, Flynn's mother had him declared dead in absentia.

== Early life ==
Sean Leslie Flynn was born on 31 May 1941 in Los Angeles to Australian-American actor Errol Flynn and French-American singer and actress Lili Damita. His paternal grandfather, Theodore Thomson Flynn, was the first professor of biology in Tasmania and served as a marine biology and zoology professor at both the University of Tasmania and at Queen's University of Belfast, where he served as the chair of zoology. Flynn's parents separated when he was young, and he was raised by his mother; he rarely saw his father growing up. His father remarried several times and as a result, he had three half sisters. Flynn attended the Lawrenceville School in Lawrenceville, New Jersey, graduating in 1960. When his father died, he left his son $5,000 to help with his college education. Flynn enrolled at Duke University, but later he left to pursue an acting career.

== Entertainment career ==
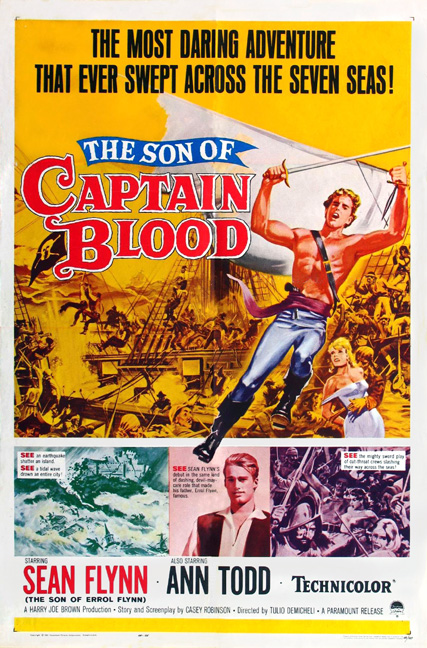
Original film poster – 1964 US release

Sean Flynn first appeared in front of the cameras at the age of 15, when he appeared in an episode of his father's television show, The Errol Flynn Theatre. The episode, "Strange Auction", was broadcast in the UK in 1956 and in the US in 1957.

Over a summer break in June 1960, Flynn visited his mother in Fort Lauderdale, Florida. At the suggestion of his friend, actor George Hamilton, Flynn filmed a scene in Hamilton's picture Where the Boys Are, which was shooting in Fort Lauderdale at the time. Most of his scenes ended up on the cutting-room floor, but he can still be seen in a scene walking past wearing a blue "Xavier University" sweatshirt.

In May 1961, at the age of 20, Flynn accepted a contract with Sage Western Pictures to appear in 1962's Il Figlio del Capitano Blood, a sequel to his father's hit film Captain Blood. He was paid $110 a week for the testing period, going up to $10,000 for 12 weeks' work in the film. As Flynn was still legally a minor, he needed his mother's permission, which was granted. The test was successful. The film was released in the US in 1964 as The Son of Captain Blood, on a double bill with Jerry Lewis' film, The Patsy. While not a great success in the U.S., it was a big hit in Europe.

In September 1961, Flynn was announced to have signed a recording contract for a company known as Hi-Fidelity R.V. Records; he had already recorded four songs for the business. Two were released: "Secret Love" b/w "Stay in My Heart". The songs were released as a 45 rpm single (Arvee A 5043, 1961, and HiFi Records R. 9003, 1962).

In 1962, Hamilton announced that he wanted to make The Brothers, based on a story by Hamilton, starring Flynn, Terry-Thomas, and himself, but the film was never made. Around this time, Flynn's fiancé was Julie Payne, daughter of actors John Payne and Anne Shirley. A few years later, he was engaged to Alessandra Panao.

Flynn made a few more films in Europe, including Il segno di Zorro (1963; released in 1964 as Duel at the Rio Grande), Verspätung in Marienborn with José Ferrer (1963; released in 1964 as Stop Train 349), Agent Special a Venise "Voir Venise et...Crever" (1964; sold to US television syndication as Mission to Venice), and Sandok, Il Maciste della Jungla (1964; released in 1966 as Temple of the White Elephant).

His movies did well in European markets, yet Flynn became bored with acting and went to Africa in late 1964 to try his hand at being a guide for safaris and big-game hunting. He also spent time as a game warden in Kenya. In the latter part of 1965, Flynn needed money, so he made two spaghetti Westerns in Spain and Italy that were released in 1966: Sette Magnifiche Pistole (Seven Guns for Timothy) and Dos Pistolas Gemelas (Sharp-Shooting Twin Sisters) co-starring the Spanish twin performers Pili and Mili. In the summer of 1966, Flynn went to Singapore to star in his eighth and final film, the French–Italian action film Cinq Gars Pour Singapour (1967; released in 1968 as Five Ashore in Singapore).

== Photojournalism career ==
=== Vietnam ===
Flynn arrived in South Vietnam in January 1966 as a freelance photojournalist, first for the French magazine Paris Match, then for Time Life, and finally for United Press International (UPI). Flynn's photos were soon published around the world. He made a name for himself as one of a group of high-risk photojournalists, which included Dana Stone, Tim Page, Henri Huet, John Steinbeck IV, Perry Deane Young, Nik Wheeler, and Chas Gerretsen, who would do anything to get the best pictures, even go into combat. In March 1966, Flynn was wounded in the knee while in the field.

In April 1966, Flynn was on patrol with some Green Berets and Nùng mercenaries, when they were ambushed by the Viet Cong. Flynn was carrying an M-16 rifle at the time and had to fight his way out, along with the other soldiers. "I thought not only me but all of us were greased." Flynn had been given the rifle by the Green Berets and been under fire with them before.

In June 1966, Flynn left Vietnam long enough to star in his last movie. Based on the 1959 novel Cinq Gars Pour Singapour by Jean Bruce, the film was shot in Paris and Singapore and was tentatively called OSS 117 Goes to Singapore, but was released as Cinq Gars Pour Singapour (Five Ashore in Singapore). He soon returned to Vietnam.

In November 1966, Flynn was credited with saving an Australian platoon from decimation by a mine by identifying the mine while photographing the troops near Vũng Tàu. He made a parachute jump with the 1st Brigade, 101st Airborne Division, the following month.

=== Israel ===
In 1967, Flynn went to Jordan to cover the Arab–Israeli war of 1967.

=== Return to Vietnam ===
Flynn returned to Vietnam in 1968, after the Tet Offensive. In September of that year, he was working as a cameraman for CBS News, when he was injured slightly by grenade fragments while shooting a battle between U.S. and North Vietnamese forces 85 miles south of Da Nang. Flynn went to Cambodia in early 1970 when news broke of North Vietnamese advances into that country.

== Disappearance ==
On April 6, 1970, Flynn and a group of journalists left Phnom Penh to attend a government-sponsored press conference in Saigon. Flynn (who was freelancing) and fellow photojournalist Dana Stone (who was on assignment for CBS) chose to travel on motorcycles instead of the limousines that the majority of the other journalists were using for traveling.

Reporter Steve Bell, who was one of the last Westerners to see the two alive, later said that after the press conference, Flynn and Stone had received word that there was a makeshift checkpoint on Highway 1 manned by members of the Viet Cong. The checkpoint consisted of a white four-door sedan in which several missing journalists had been traveling, and which was now parked across the roadway. Flynn and Stone observed the checkpoint from some distance and spoke to several journalists already on scene. Surviving film footage captured both this moment and the sight of several people, believed to be Viet Cong, moving around on the far side of the vehicle.

Undaunted by the sight of a nearby platoon of government soldiers taking up defensive positions in a line perpendicular to the road, and eager to interview the Viet Cong, both Flynn and Stone chose to proceed alone to the checkpoint. Witnesses later reported that both Flynn and Stone were quickly relieved of their motorcycles and marched into a nearby treeline. Neither was ever seen alive again. Before they left, Bell snapped the last known photo taken of Flynn and Stone.

Four other journalists, two Frenchmen and two Japanese, had been captured by the Viet Cong inside Cambodia on the same day. By June 1970, 25 journalists had been captured in Cambodia in the previous three weeks. Three had been killed, some returned, and others were missing. Flynn and Stone were never seen again and their bodies have never been found.

=== Later events ===
Although it is known that Flynn and Stone were captured by Viet Cong guerrillas at a checkpoint on Highway 1, their fate is unknown. Citing various government sources, it is believed that they were killed by factions of the Khmer Rouge. Flynn's mother spent an enormous amount of money searching for her son, to no avail. In 1984, she had Flynn declared legally dead. She died in 1994.

Investigations by fellow photojournalist Tim Page, reported in various UK and US newspapers in 1991, indicate that Stone and Flynn were taken first to the village of Sangke Kaong, and then to other villages before being handed to the Khmer Rouge, who later executed them. Page tracked down an almost-empty grave in a village in Kampong Cham province in which two foreigners allegedly had been buried. Interviews with villagers suggested they belonged to a tall man and a short man—consistent with the appearance of Flynn and Stone, respectively. However, in 2003, the US military's Central Identification Lab in Hawaii confirmed by DNA testing that the remains found by Tim Page were actually those of Clyde McKay, a merchant marine crew member and mutineer during the SS Columbia Eagle incident.

The duo's disappearance is chronicled in journalist Perry Deane Young's 1975 memoir, Two of the Missing. A 1991 film, Danger on the Edge of Town, recounted photographer Tim Page's decades-long search to discover the fate of his friends Flynn and Stone.

In March 2010, a team of two amateurs searching for Flynn's body uncovered partial remains in Kampong Cham province, believed to be of a Western hostage allegedly executed by the Khmer Rouge. Test results released in late June 2010 indicated they were not the remains of Flynn. A spokesman for the Joint POW/MIA Accounting Command said no match was found between DNA from the recovered remains and DNA samples they had on file from the Flynn family, and "the remains do not match any known Westerner."

== In popular culture ==
- Dennis Hopper's photojournalist character in the film Apocalypse Now is said to have been based on Sean Flynn.
- The story of Flynn was recounted by The Clash in the song "Sean Flynn" from the album Combat Rock.
- Flynn has a prominent role in Michael Herr's book about his experiences as a war correspondent, Dispatches.
- Flynn was portrayed by Kevin Dillon in the 1992 British/Australian miniseries Frankie's House, based on a book by Flynn's friend and colleague, photojournalist Tim Page.
- In August 2008, The Hollywood Reporter announced that Mythic Films had optioned the rights to the Perry Deane Young memoir, Two of the Missing. At that time, Young was working on a screenplay with director Ralph Hemecker.
- In 2011, a film inspired by Sean Flynn as a photojournalist entitled The Road to Freedom was filmed on location in Cambodia by director Brendan Moriarty.

== Filmography ==
- The Errol Flynn Theatre (1956 TV series) – episode "Strange Auction"
- Where the Boys Are (1960)
- The Son of Captain Blood (1962)
- Duel at the Rio Grande (1963)
- Stop Train 349 (1963)
- Mission to Venice (1964)
- Temple of the White Elephant (1964)
- Seven Guns for Timothy (1966)
- Sharp-Shooting Twin Sisters (1966)
- Five Ashore in Singapore a.k.a. Singapore, Singapore (1967)
- Wheel of Ashes (1968)

== See also ==
- John Dawson Dewhirst
- List of journalists killed and missing in the Vietnam War
- List of people who disappeared mysteriously (1910–1970)
- Mayaguez incident
