= The Son of Captain Blood =

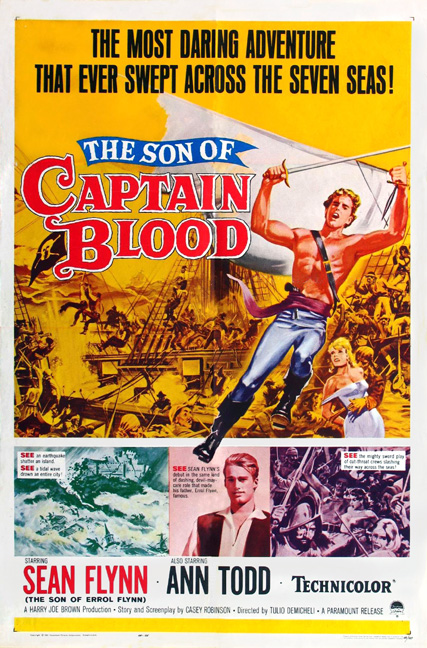
- U.S. theatrical release poster.
- Directed by: Tulio Demicheli
- Screenplay by: Casey Robinson; Giuseppe Masini; Mario Caiano
- Based on: Captain Blood; 1922 novel by Rafael Sabatini
- Produced by: Harry Joe Brown
- Starring: Sean Flynn; Ann Todd
- Cinematography: Alejandro Ulloa
- Edited by: Renato Cinquini; Antonio Ramirez
- Music by: Gregorio García Segura; Angelo Francesco Lavagnino
- Color process: Technicolor
- Production company: Compagnia Cinematografica Mondiale
- Distributed by: Paramount Pictures (United States)
- Release date: July 27, 1962
- Running time: 95 minutes
- Countries: Italy; Spain; United States
- Language: English

The Son of Captain Blood is a 1962 Italian/Spanish/American international co-production film. It is the first starring role in a film for Sean Flynn, the son of Errol Flynn, who played the title character in the 1935 film Captain Blood. The film was released in Great Britain in 1963 by Warner-Pathe (in some regions on a double bill with Hammer's The Scarlet Blade). Paramount Pictures released the film in the U.S. in 1964 on a double bill with the Jerry Lewis film The Patsy.

== Plot ==
Robert Blood, son of the great Captain Peter Blood, is restless to go to sea when his mother finally gives her consent. Robert is assigned a ship. On board he meets a beautiful young damsel named Abigail. At sea their ship is attacked by the pirate, Malagon, and they are taken prisoner. Malagon is an old enemy of Captain Blood and delights in mistreating Robert. With the help of some of Captain Blood's former shipmates, who are now part of Malagon's crew, Robert takes over Malagon's ship. Now captain of a pirate ship, Robert and his crew come across a slaver ship and rescue some of Robert's servants who have been taken to be sold as slaves.

Robert and his men return to his native Jamaica to battle the corrupt authorities. As Robert and his crew win their fight, the 1692 Jamaica earthquake and tidal wave strike the island. Robert and his men rescue his mother and others trapped in a church in Port Royal. They all survive. In the aftermath, Robert and Abigail are set to marry and live happily ever after.

== Cast ==
- Sean Flynn as Robert Blood
- Alessandra Panaro as Abigail 'Abby' McBride
- John Kitzmiller as Moses
- José Nieto as Capitan De Malagon
- Roberto Camardiel as Oliver Orguelthorpe
- Fernando Sancho as Timothy Thomas
- Ann Todd as Arabella Blood

== Production ==
Flynn tested for the role in May 1961 and the film was announced in September. Harry Joe Brown originally announced Casey Robinson would write and Nathan Juran would direct, but the film was directed by Argentine born Spanish director, Tulio Demicheli.

Several scenes were shot around the Dénia harbour in Spain respectively the Gulf of Valencia. Before leaving for Spain, Flynn enlisted stuntman and fellow actor Jock Mahoney who frequently stunt doubled for his father Errol to teach him how to fight, fence, and fall safely and convincingly on screen.

== Reception ==
When the film was released in Los Angeles in 1964 as part of a double bill with Law of the Lawless, a Los Angeles Times reviewer wrote that except for battle sequences and natural disasters, "the film is rudderless". Flynn was described as not "yet much of an actor", and "does not even have an echo of the romantic Flynn voice that could make the most inane dialogue in these epics sound vaguely Shakespearean."

== Biography ==
- Hughes, Howard (2011). Cinema Italiano – The Complete Guide From Classics To Cult. London – New York: I.B.Tauris. ISBN 978-1-84885-608-0.
