= Seven Guns for Timothy =

- Italian: 7 magnifiche pistole
- Directed by: Romolo Guerrieri
- Written by: Giovanni Simonelli; José Antonio de la Loma
- Story by: Alfonso Balcázar
- Starring: Sean Flynn; Evelyn Stewart; Fernando Sancho
- Cinematography: Angelo Filippini; Víctor Monreal
- Music by: Gino Peguri
- Production companies: Balcázar Producciones Cinematográficas; C.I.A. Cinematografica; N.B.S. Cinematografica
- Distributed by: Kora-Film; Filmax Distr. de Pelic. S.A.; Sunfilm Entertainment
- Release date: 8 April 1966 (Italy)
- Running time: 89 minutes
- Countries: Italy; Spain
- Language: English

Seven Guns for Timothy, also known as 7 magnifiche pistole, Siete Pistolas para Timothy and Seven Magnificent Guns, is a 1966 Italian-Spanish Western directed by Romolo Guerrieri, written by Giovanni Simonelli and José Antonio de la Loma and starring Sean Flynn.

== Plot ==
Timothy Benson, a young intellectual and greenhorn inherits a gold mine. Rodrigo Rodriguez, a bandido leader will stop at nothing to get Timothy to deed him the mine. It is up to Timothy's foreman and his friends to teach Timothy to be a tough hombre and with their help, stop the bandit, Rodrigo Rodriguez.

== Cast ==
- Sean Flynn as Timothy Hollister Benson
- Fernando Sancho as Sancho Rodrigo Rodriguez
- Evelyn Stewart as Coralie
- Daniel Martín as Slim
- Frank Oliveras as Bert
- Poldo Bendandi as Corky
- Tito García as Abel
- Spartaco Conversi as Brett Colton
- Rafael Albaicín as Grey Eagle
- Antonio Almorós as Sheriff Coleman
- Silvana Bacci
- Ivan Basta
- Mario Filippo
- Osvaldo Genazzani
- Maruska Rossetti
- Anita Todesco
- William Conroy as Cowboy
- Alberigo Donadeo as Man in Saloon
