= W.E.B. =

- Genre: Drama
- Starring: Pamela Bellwood; Richard Basehart; Alex Cord
- Country of origin: United States
- Original language: English
- No. of seasons: 1
- No. of episodes: 5

Production
- Producer: Lin Bolen
- Running time: 60 minutes
- Production company: 20th Century Fox Television

Original release
- Network: NBC
- Release: September 13 – October 5, 1978

W.E.B. is an American prime time drama series that aired on NBC for five episodes from September 13 until October 5, 1978.

== Cast ==
- Pamela Bellwood as Ellen Cunningham
- Alex Cord as Jack Kiley
- Lee Wilkof as Harvey Pearlstein
- Richard Basehart as Gus Dunlap

== Overview ==
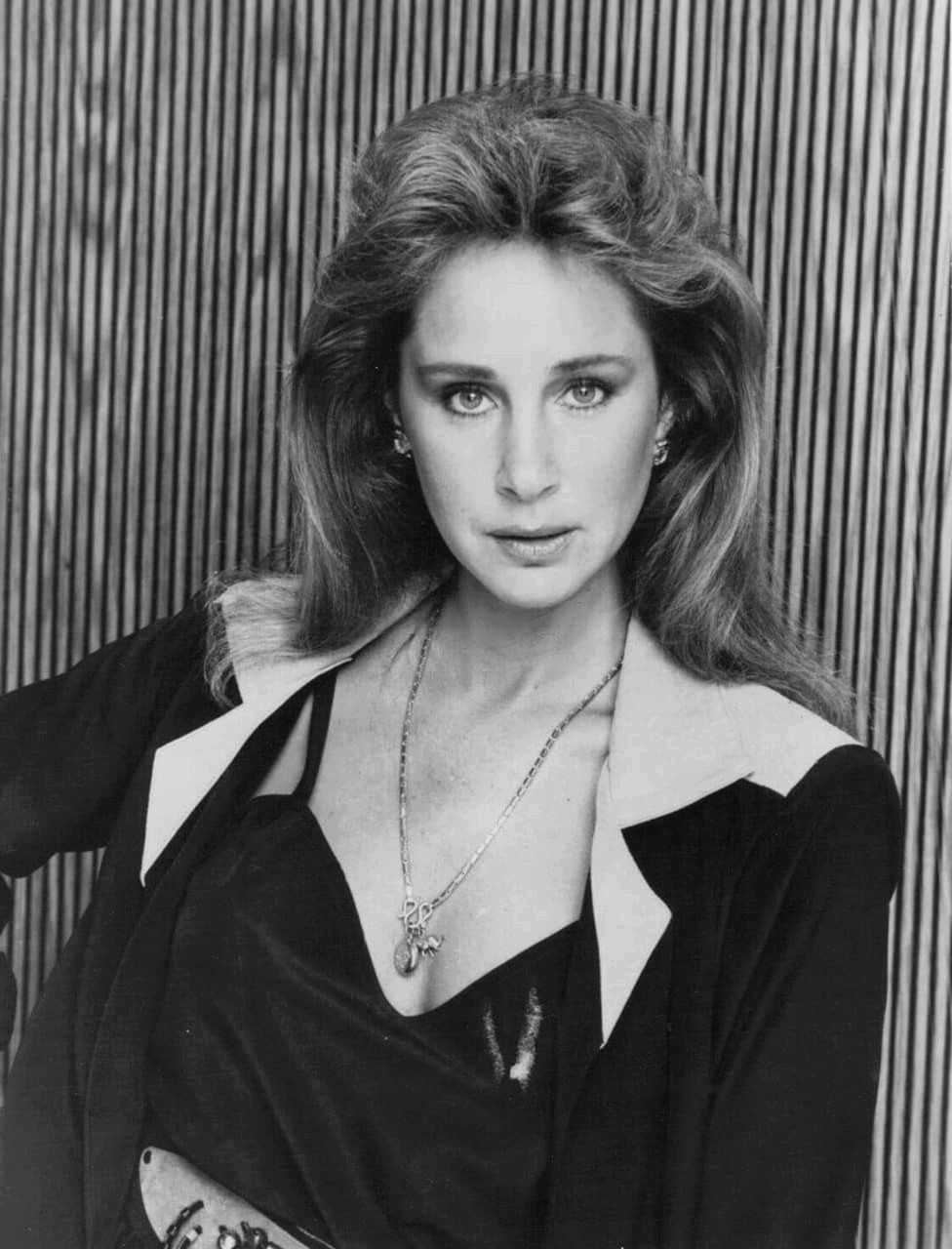
Pamela Bellwood portrays Ellen Cunningham in the series.

W.E.B. showed the inner workings of the TV industry, centering on brash female programming executive Ellen Cunningham (Pamela Bellwood) at fictional network Trans-American Broadcasting (TAB). As head of Special Events Programming, Ellen was confronted with a variety of obstacles, most notably her male colleagues, such as ruthless programming head Jack Kiley (Alex Cord), drunken has-been news chief Gus Dunlap (Richard Basehart), and ratings-obsessed research chief Harvey Pearlstein (Lee Wilkof).

The initials that comprised W.E.B. were never explained on the series; presumably, it referred to the fact that "web" is a slang term for a broadcast network. (In promotional spots, the show was called simply "web")

W.E.B. was originally scheduled to air on Wednesday nights at 10pm Eastern, and debuted on Wednesday, September 13, 1978. However, new NBC boss Fred Silverman's decision to scrap the proposed hour-long sitcom Coastocoast, originally announced for the Thursday 10pm slot, caused the network to move W.E.B. to Thursdays. W.E.B. aired four more episodes, the last on October 5, 1978. The show, the sixth lowest-rated network program of the entire 1978–79 season (10.1 rating, 18 share), was replaced with the police drama David Cassidy: Man Undercover.

In a case of life and art imitating each other, W.E.B. was at least partially inspired by the 1976 film Network, starring Faye Dunaway. Dunaway's role in the film (ratings-mad TV exec Diana Christensen) was said to have been based on NBC's former daytime programming chief Lin Bolen—who produced W.E.B. However, Bolen denied that the Network character was based on her.

== Reception ==
Tom Shales wrote that most of W.E.B. was "just dopey-dreadful in a half-entertaining way – no competition for respectable dramas like Lou Grant and Family but no real threat to one's bottom line of boredom, either." He described Ellen Cunningham by comparing her to the protagonist in Way Down East, saying that she was "perhaps the most put-upon and abused heroine since Lillian Gish carried a silent-movie baby across the ice floes with the hound dogs yappin' at her heels." He also mocked Trans-American Broadcasting by calling it "the only TV network ever to be named after a cola" because of its acronym. He only praised the performances of Bellwood, Basehart and Tisch Raye, who played Gus Dunlap's wife Christine.
