= Corinne Dufka =

American photojournalist, investigator, and social worker

- Education: University of California, Berkeley
- Occupations: Photojournalist, human rights researcher, criminal investigator, social worker
- Awards: 1st prize, Spot News stories – World Press Photo; 1996 Robert Capa Gold Medal – Overseas Press Club of America; 1996 Courage in Journalism Award – International Women's Media Foundation; 1997

Corinne Dufka is an American photojournalist, human rights researcher, criminal investigator, and social worker. She is the recipient of a MacArthur "genius grant" Fellowship.

== Early life and education ==
Dufka grew up in Utah and California received a bachelor's degree from San Francisco State University in 1979. In 1984, she graduated from the University of California, Berkeley with a master's degree in social work.

== Career ==
=== Social work ===
Following completion of her master's degree, Dufka worked as a humanitarian volunteer and social worker in Latin America. She volunteered with Nicaraguan refugees during the country's revolution, and with victims of the 1985 Mexico City earthquake. She then moved to El Salvador as a social worker with the Lutheran church. While in El Salvador, Dufka became close with local photojournalists, and was asked by the director of a local human rights organization to launch a program to document human rights abuses through photography. The director of the program was killed two weeks later, reportedly by death squads. Dufka's photos of his body ran in The New York Times, and she accepted the position.

=== Photojournalism ===
Dufka received her first contract as a photojournalist in 1989, with the Reuters news agency, covering the conflict in El Salvador. In 1992, she relocated to Sarajevo, where she covered the ethnic conflicts in the Balkans. Dufka remained in the region until 1993, when the vehicle in which she was traveling encountered an anti-tank mine. She was seriously injured, suffering facial lacerations, internal injuries, and ligament damage.

Following three weeks of rehabilitation in London, Dufka returned to the field on assignment for Reuters in Mogadishu, Somalia. She remained stationed in East Africa, covering much of the continent for the agency, including the Rwandan genocide. Her images from Rwanda were later used as evidence during the International Criminal Tribunal for Rwanda. She covered famine in Sudan, conflict in the Democratic Republic of Congo, and the Liberian civil war, among others.

In 1998, Dufka went to Nairobi, Kenya to cover the bombing of the American Embassy. She arrived hours after the blast, and was deeply frustrated by 'missing the scoop.' Later, upon watching the news coverage of the attack, Dufka realized that she had lost “compassion” for the subjects of her work, and resolved to end her career as a photojournalist.

=== Human rights ===
In 1999, Dufka left Nairobi to open a field office for Human Rights Watch in Freetown, Sierra Leone, where she documented human rights abuses associated with the country's ongoing civil war. In 2002 she took a leave of absence to work as a criminal investigator for the Chief of Investigations and the Prosecutor for the United Nations' Special Court for Sierra Leone.

In 2003, Dufka returned the United States. That same year she was awarded the MacArthur "genius grant" Fellowship for her journalistic and documentary work documenting the 'devastation' of Sierra Leone and the conflict's toll on human rights. Dufka returned to West Africa in 2005 to lead the Human Rights Watch field office in Dakar, Senegal until 2011. She worked as a senior researcher for the Africa division of Human Rights Watch, overseeing the organization's work on West Africa until 2022.

In 2012, Dufka testified before the United States Senate Foreign Relations Committee on the armed conflict in northern Mali.

== Publications ==
- This Is War: Photographs from a Decade of Conflict. G, 2023. ISBN 978-0986250033.

== Awards ==
- 1996: 1st prize, Spot News stories, World Press Photo
- 1996: Robert Capa Gold Medal, Overseas Press Club of America
- 1997: International Women's Media Foundation Courage in Journalism Award
- 1997: Finalist, Pulitzer Prize for Breaking News Photography
- 2003: MacArthur Fellows Program
