= Temple of the White Elephant =

- Directed by: Umberto Lenzi
- Starring: Sean Flynn
- Release date: 1964
- Running time: 85 minutes
- Countries: Italy; France
- Language: English

Temple of the White Elephant, also known as Sandok, il Maciste della Giungla, is a 1964 film directed by Umberto Lenzi and starring Sean Flynn.

== Plot ==
In British colonial India, Lt. Dick Ramsay is charged with secretly rescuing the kidnapped daughter of the British viceroy of India and her fiancée, a fellow British officer from a cult of murderers who worship a white elephant. While on his mission he meets Princess Dhara and her man servant and protector, Parvati/Sandok. Princess Dhara's brother has also been taken captive by the Cult of the White Elephant. Princess Dhara and Parvati/Sandok aid Lt. Ramsay in his mission to free the captives and put an end to the cult's reign of terror.

== Cast ==
- Sean Flynn as Lt. Dick Ramsay
- Marie Versini as Princess Dhara
- Alessandra Panaro as Cynthia, the viceroy's daughter
- Giacomo Rossi Stuart as Lt. Reginald Milliner, Cynthia's fiancée
- Mimmo Palmara as Parvati/Sandok

== Production ==
Filmed on location in what was then known as Ceylon, (now known as Sri Lanka). The film was a French/Italian co-production. Sean dubbed his own dialog in the English language prints. In the English and Italian language prints Alessandra Panaro's character is known as Cynthia Montague. In the Spanish and French prints she is known as Cynthia Patterson. Mimmo Palmara is known as Sandok in the Italian language prints. In the English, French and Spanish prints he is known as Parvati.
