= Duel at the Rio Grande =

1963 film

- Directed by: Mario Caiano
- Written by: Casey Robinson
- Produced by: Harry Joe Brown
- Starring: Sean Flynn
- Music by: Gregorio García Segura
- Release date: 25 December 1963
- Running time: 90 minutes
- Countries: Spain; Italy; France
- Language: English

Duel at the Rio Grande is a 1963 Italian/French/Spanish co-production film starring Sean Flynn. The film is loosely based on The Mark of Zorro. It was produced by Harry Joe Brown.

It is also known as Il Segno di Zorro (The Sign of Zorro).

== Plot ==
Ramon Martinez y Rayol, a half Basque/half Castilian caballero leaves his native Spain for Mexico at the request of his mother. She tells him that the father he was told was dead, is actually alive and living in Mexico and has asked for his son's help. When he arrives in Mexico he finds that his father has died under mysterious circumstances. Determining that his father has met with foul play, he uses "the sign of Zorro", to lead a campaign against a corrupt generalissimo. Along the way he wins the heart of a beautiful senorita.

== Cast ==
- Sean Flynn as Ramon Martinez y Rayol
- Folco Lulli as Jose
- Gaby André as Senora Guiterrez
- Danielle De Metz as Manuela
- Enrique Diosdado as Gobernador
- Armando Calvo as Gen. Gutiérrez
- Helga Liné as Mercedes
- Carlo Tamberlani as Alcalde
- Mino Doro as Don Luis
- Mario Petri as teniente Martino
- Walter Barnes as Mario
- Elena Barrios as Señora Martinez
- Mimo Billi
- Xan das Bolas as Mejicano
- Gigi Bonos as padre Diaz

== Production ==
The film's original title was Il Segno di Zorro which translates as "The Sign of Zorro". To avoid copyright issues (Disney had released a compilation film of their TV series with the title Sign of Zorro (1960)), Harry Joe Brown released the film under the less Zorro sounding title of "Duel at the Rio Grande" and had removed from the film almost any mention of Zorro.

Nathan Juran may have worked on the US release. In the English print credits, the director is listed as N. Juran.
