= André Liohn =

Brazilian photojournalist

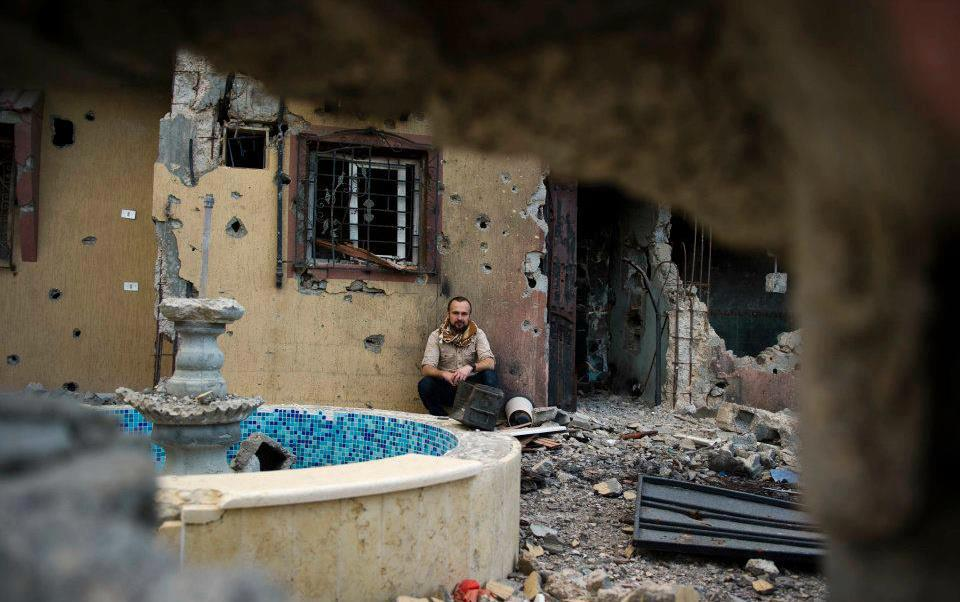
- André Liohn in Misuratah Libya April 2012
- Born: André L. Garcia de Oliveira; 9 November 1974 (age 51); Botucatu, Brazil
- Citizenship: Brazil, Norway
- Occupation: Photojournalist
- Known for: Robert Capa Gold Medal (2012)
- Children: Lyah Azzura, Anton Dannill, Léo Eskil

André Liohn (born November 9, 1974) is a freelance photojournalist born in Botucatu, Brazil, frequently contributing to the publications Der Spiegel, L'Espresso, Time, Newsweek, Le Monde, Veja, and others.

== Biography ==
André Liohn lived in Botucatu, Brazil, during his childhood. In his early 20s, he moved to Trondheim, Norway where he lived for 15 years. He started photographing at the age of 30. In his first years in photography, he met the Czech photographer Antonín Kratochvíl who became his personal friend and mentor, influencing his work and his views about photography.

In the 2015 article written for Vice, "A War Photographer Returns Home", Giancarlo Roma, son of American photographer Thomas Roma and grandson of photographer Lee Friedlander described André as follow: "For anyone who knows conflict photographer André Liohn, he's among the first people that comes to mind when asked the question, "Who would you want on your side in a bar fight?" Liohn is not tall, but it's clear upon meeting him that he possesses a strength, physically and otherwise, that only comes with living through true hardship. He also exclusively wears black, rides a Harley, and has a tattoo on his right forearm that reads "REFUGEE" in block letters."

In 2011 he became the first Latin American photojournalist to receive the prestigious Robert Capa Gold Medal from the Overseas Press Club for his work on the Libyan Civil War and nominated by the Prix Bayeux-Calvados des Correspondents de Guerre. His work documenting the challenges faced by health care personal working in conflict areas has been used by the ICRC's Health Care in Danger project, denouncing cases of violence against health care personal around the world

== Pulitzer Center on Crisis Reporting ==
In April 2010, Liohn made public the case where the Pulitzer Center on Crisis Reporting grantee and World Press Photo winner, Marco Vernaschi, forced a Ugandan mother to exhume her recently deceased child, offering payment after the fact. Liohn learned about the case after visiting Uganda to report on cases of human sacrifices and after observing vague photo captions written by Vernaschi, that he was not present at the time of burial and had, in essence, staged a photo and offered payment in return. After notifying the Pulitzer Center and the photojournalist Anne Holmes, who subsequently removed an interview with Vernaschi that had previously been on her blog, Liohn went public on the journalist's forum Lightstalkers. The story drew more attention when Roy Greenslade wrote it up in The Guardian. As of October 2011, the Pulitzer Center remains firmly behind Vernaschi's work, although it has withdrawn several images from this and another story (where questions were raised about the ethics of showing the face and genitalia of a child who had suffered genital mutilation) and hosted a debate and discussion about the photographer's working methods, journalistic integrity, and professional ethics.

== Assassination attempt ==
In the interview "Kevin Dawes on His Time in Libya" conducted by Eliot Higgins for the site Bellingcat, Kevin Dawes, an American freelance soldier who actively participated alongside the Libyan rebels during the 2011 Libyan civil war and later faced arrest in Syria for joining the Syrian rebels against the government in 2012, recounts a significant incident involving a conflict with a photographer whom he initially referred to as "Frank." However, it is later revealed that the photographer in question is André Liohn. This incident occurred in Sirte, a city in Libya, during the ongoing civil war.

According to Dawes, during their time in Sirte, tensions rose between him and Liohn. Dawes reveals that he contemplated taking Liohn's life during this encounter, reflecting their conflict's intensity and hostility. "I thought about blowing his fucking brains out. Kicking him hard and knocking him into the street and letting the PKT gunner do it. It would have been so damn easy and I was so angry."

== ADIL - Almost Dawn in Libya ==
In 2012, with fellow photographers Christopher Morris, Jehad Nga, Bryan Denton, Lynsey Addario, Eric Bouvet and Finbarr O'Reilly, he created the project Almost Dawn in Libya, four photo exhibits in the main Libyan cities of Tripoli, Benghazi, Misurata and Zintan. The project gained great media coverage and was funded partly by a crowdfunding campaign hosted by the website Emphas.is and partly by the international NGO International Medical Corps. The project's idea was to use photojournalism as a bridge for reconciliation in Libya after its civil war. The exhibits were curated by Italian curator Annalisa D'Angelo and photographer Paolo Pellegrin.

== Books ==
- 2016 - Correspondente de Guerra co-authorship with Diogo Schelp - Editora Contexto.
- 2021 - "Pandemia e Anarquia" brings together fifteen essays by researchers of libertarian practices that analyze the sociopolitical implications of the new coronavirus and its relationship with modes of existence. - Editora Hedra

== Documentary ==
"You are not a soldier" - 2021 - In an attempt to understand what drove her father's desires to be on the frontlines, documentary director Maria Carolina Telles dives into the story of award-winning war photographer André Liohn. André was a man who struggled with his own internal grief, often choosing to immerse himself in some of the world's most notorious conflict zones. Highly decorated for his work, including the prestigious Robert Capa Gold Medal, his life takes a drastic turning point shortly after the death of his colleagues Tim Hetherington, Chris Hondros, Marie Colvin and James Foley. Having witnessed immeasurable suffering and fear, he begins to question his motives for placing himself in such danger and examines the disturbing but fine line between the life and death he has witnessed and to what end he will go to reveal those truths.

== Theater ==
André Liohn's life story was the basis of the character Pedrinho in the 2014 play Fora da Ordem by Lelo Filho. Like, Liohn, the character in the play is a documentary filmmaker, and father of two who lives in Norway from where he leaves to cover historical events around the world. The play was inspired by a homonymous song by Caetano Veloso and went on to win the 2013 Myriam Muniz Award from FUNARTE.

== Political views ==
André Liohn is an anarchist who follows the Mutualism (economic theory) political and economic theory originated from the writings of philosopher Pierre-Joseph Proudhon.

== Exhibitions ==
- 2024 - KRIG - Trondheim - Norway
- 2024 - O Gosto da Guerra - Museu da Imagem e do Som - São Paulo - Brazil
- 2017 - REVOGO - SINTRA PRESS - Portugal
- 2017 - Na Linha de frente (Collective) - Museu da fotografia de Fortaleza - Brazil
- 2016 - REVOGO - lodi festival della fotografia etica - Italy
- 2015 - REVOGO - Instituto Caixa Cultural - São Paulo - Brazil
- 2015 - Assistência à Saúde em Perigo: Líbia e Somália no olhar de André Liohn" ICRC Biblioteca Parque Villa Lobos - São Paulo
- 2014 - FGW1414 exhibition MEMO THE FIRST GLOBAL WAR - Atlante delle Guerre e dei Conflitti del Mondo & Museo Storico del Trentino.
- 2014 - Assistência à Saúde em Perigo: Líbia e Somália no olhar de André Liohn" ICRC Museu Nacional Honestino Guimarães
- 2013 - Violence against health care through the ages - ICRC Geneve
- 2011 - Almost Dawn in Libya - Libya

== Awards ==
- 2010 - New York Photo Festival Photographic coverage of the 2010 Haiti earthquake Series category (winner)
- 2010 - New York Photo Festival Photographic coverage of the 2010 Haiti earthquake Singles category (finalist)
- 2011 - Prêmio ESSO de Jornalismo Somália - O Diário das Trevas - Finalist
- 2011 - Yonhap United Nations Millennium Awards
- 2012 - Robert Capa Gold Medal Award from the Overseas Press Club
- 2012 - National Press Photographers Association – Best of Photojournalism, 2nd in International News Picture Story
- 2012 - Webby Award official honoree
- 2012 - Bayeux-Calvados Awards for war correspondents
- 2017 - Prêmio Jabuti Correspondente de Guerra (Diogo Schelp e André Liohn / editora Contexto) - Finalist
- 2017 - Norwegian Picture of the year First Prize News Reports abroad
- 2018 - Norwegian Picture of the year First Prize News Reports abroad
- 2019 - Pictures of the Year International - IMPACT 2019–IMMIGRATION STATUS | Second place
- 2020 - National Press Photographers Association Best of Photojournalism - News and Issues - "Inside Libya's brutal battle for control of Tripoli" | Third Place
- 2021 - Norwegian Picture of the year First Prize News Reports abroad
- 2022 - Norwegian Picture of the year First Prize News Reports abroad
