= Carolyn Van Houten =

American photojournalist

Carolyn Van Houten is a Pulitzer Prize-winning independent photojournalist who previously worked for The Washington Post. She has won Newspaper Photographer of the Year, Pictures of the Year International (2016); Excellence in Photojournalism award from NLGJA: The Association of LGBTQ Journalists (2017), Robert Capa Gold Medal (2018), Pulitzer Prize in Explanatory Reporting (2020), and Photography - International category, Robert F. Kennedy Journalism Award (2019).

== Life and work ==
Van Houten grew up on a farm in rural North Carolina. She studied journalism at the University of North Carolina at Chapel Hill.

She has worked as a photo intern at National Geographic, and a staff photojournalist at the San Antonio Express-News covering south and west Texas. She worked in more than 50 countries as a staff photojournalist at The Washington Post, before becoming an independent photographer based out of Washington, DC.

== Awards ==
- 2016: Winner, Newspaper Photographer of the Year, Pictures of the Year International
- 2017: Excellence in Photojournalism award from NLGJA: The Association of LGBTQ Journalists
- 2018: Robert Capa Gold Medal, from the Overseas Press Club of America
- 2019: Winner, Photography - International category, Robert F. Kennedy Journalism Award from the Robert F. Kennedy Center for Justice and Human Rights
- 2020: Winner, Pulitzer Prize with The Washington Post for 2C: Beyond the Limit
