= Luc Delahaye =

French photographer

Luc Delahaye (born 1962) is a French photographer known for his large-scale color works depicting conflicts, world events or social issues. His pictures are characterized by detachment, directness and rich details, a documentary approach which is however countered by dramatic intensity and a narrative structure.

Delahaye has been awarded the Robert Capa Gold Medal twice, the Oskar Barnack Award, an Infinity Award from the International Center of Photography, the Deutsche Börse Photography Prize and the Prix Pictet.

== Career ==
Delahaye started his career as a photojournalist. He joined the photo agency Sipa Press in the mid-1980s and dedicated himself to war reporting. In 1994, he joined the Magnum Photos cooperative and Newsweek magazine (he left Magnum in 2004). He worked during the 1980s and 1990s as a war photographer in Afghanistan, Rwanda, Bosnia, Israel/Palestine, the Gulf, Chechnya, and Lebanon. His photography was characterized by its raw, direct recording of news and often combined a perilous closeness to events with an intellectual detachment in the questioning of his own presence. This concern was later mirrored in minimalist series published as books, notably Portrait/1, a set of photobooth portraits of homeless people and L'Autre, a series of candid portraits made with a hidden camera in the Paris subway. With Winterreise, he explored the social consequences of the economic depression in Russia, "travelling from Moscow to Vladivostok, during which he spent months in the hovels of Russia's underclass". In 2001, Delahaye conducted a radical formal change. Documenting conflicts, political events or social issues, his pictures are made using large or medium format cameras, sometimes edited on computers and are shown in museums. While exploring the boundaries between reality and the imaginary, they constitute documents-monuments of immediate history, and urge reflection "upon the relationships among art, history and information".

== Books ==
- Portraits/1 (Sommaire, 1996)
- Memo (Hazan, 1997)
- L'Autre (Phaidon, 1999)
- Winterreise (Phaidon, 2000)
- Une Ville (Xavier Barral, 2003)
- History (Chris Boot, 2003)
- Luc Delahaye 2006–2010 (Steidl, 2011)

== Awards ==
- 1992: Robert Capa Gold Medal
- 2000: Oskar Barnack Award
- 2001: Infinity Award: Photojournalism, International Center of Photography, New York
- 2001: Robert Capa Gold Medal
- 2002: Niepce Prize
- 2002: Photojournalism prize, Bayeux Calvados-Normandy Award for war correspondents
- 2005: Deutsche Börse Photography Prize
- 2012: Prix Pictet

== Collections ==
Delahaye's work is held in the following public collections:

- Chrysler Museum of Art, Norfolk, Virginia
- J. Paul Getty Museum, Los Angeles: 2 prints (as of June 2021)
- High Museum of Art, Atlanta
- Huis Marseille, Amsterdam
- International Center of Photography, New York: 1 print (as of June 2021)
- Los Angeles County Museum of Art: 7 prints (as of June 2021)
- Museum Helmond
- National Gallery of Canada, Ottawa: 1 print (as of June 2021)
- National Media Museum, Bradford, UK
- San Francisco Museum of Modern Art, San Francisco: 2 prints (as of June 2021)
- Tate, UK: 7 prints (as of June 2021)

== Exhibitions ==
=== Solo exhibitions ===
- Rencontres d'Arles festival (2001)
- Völklingen Ironworks (2002)
- Centre photographique d'Île-de-France (2002)
- Kunsthalle Rostock (2002)
- Kunsthal (Rotterdam, 2002)
- National Media Museum (Bradford, 2004)
- Huis Marseille (Amsterdam, 2004)
- Cleveland Museum of Art (2005)
- Sprengel Museum (Hanover, 2006)
- Recent History: Photographs by Luc Delahaye, J. Paul Getty Museum, Los Angeles, 2007

=== Group exhibitions ===
- 2014: Conflict, Time, Photography
  Tate Modern, London, 26 November 2014 – 15 March 2015
  Museum Folkwang, Essen, 10 April – 5 July 2015
  Staatliche Kunstsammlungen Dresden, Dresden, Germany, 31 July – 25 October 2015
