= Rudi Frey =

Austrian photographer (1941–2014)

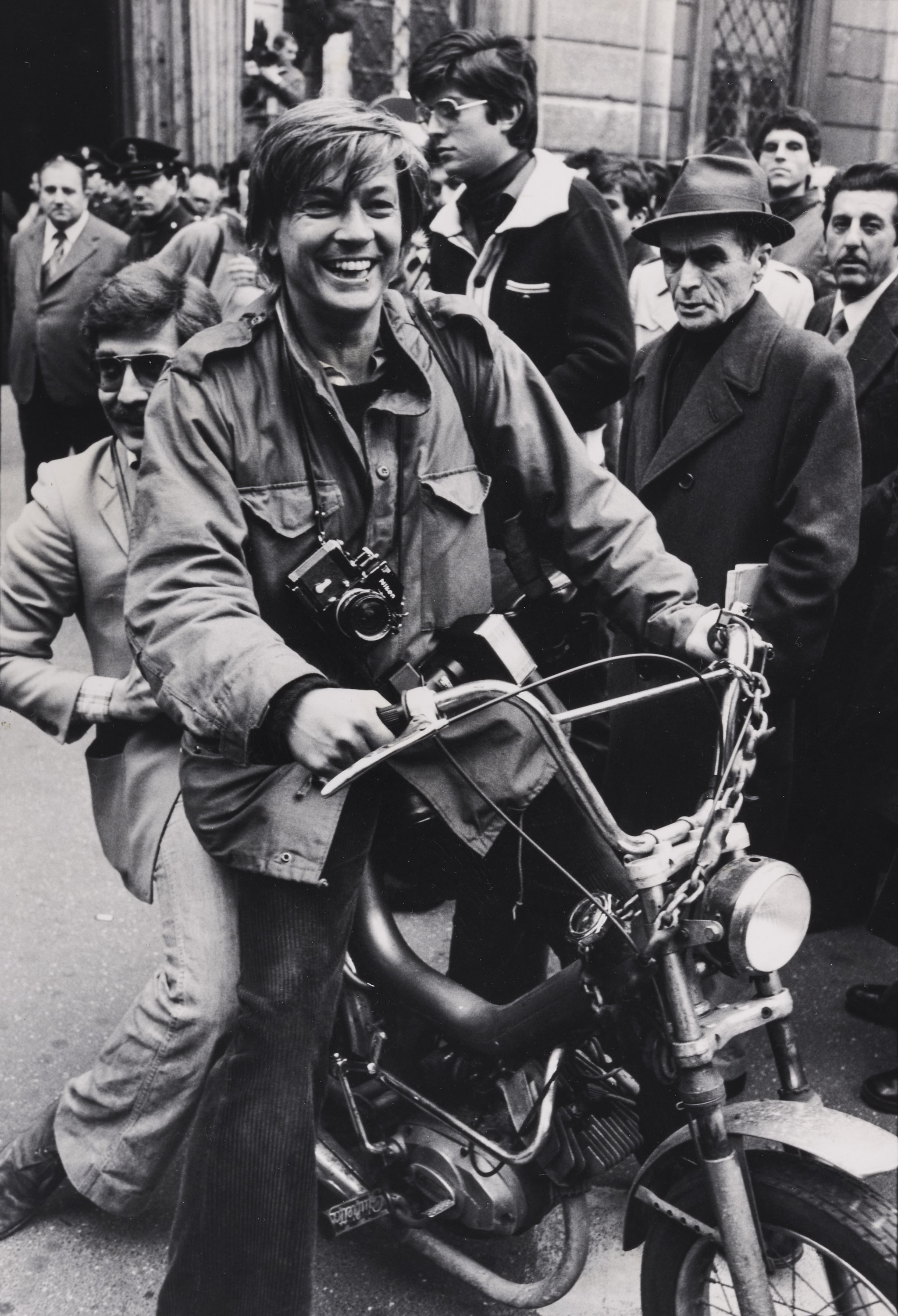
Rudi Frey. Image taken by unknown Photographer

Rudi Frey (21 December 1941 in Radebeul – 8 January 2014 in Rome) was an Austrian photographer and recipient of the Robert Capa Gold Medal who worked from Rome for international magazines.

== Life ==
Although Rudi Frey was born in Germany, he grew up in Salzburg. After leaving school, he left Salzburg and rarely returned there throughout his life. He first went to Paris to study film and began working as a photographer. He then assisted photographers Barry Lategan and David Bailey in London. In 1973, he got a job in Rome at the Italian magazine Panorama and moved to the Italian capital. Later he also worked for Time. It is said about his life that it almost ideally traces the biography of the independent, reckless photographer of the "golden age of press photography."[

According to Johnathan Beaty and S.C. Gwynn, Rudi Frey played a key role in exposing the BCCI banking scandal - getting the journalists a camera and then smuggling rolls of film from Poland to Rome, from where they were sent to the editorial office in New York.

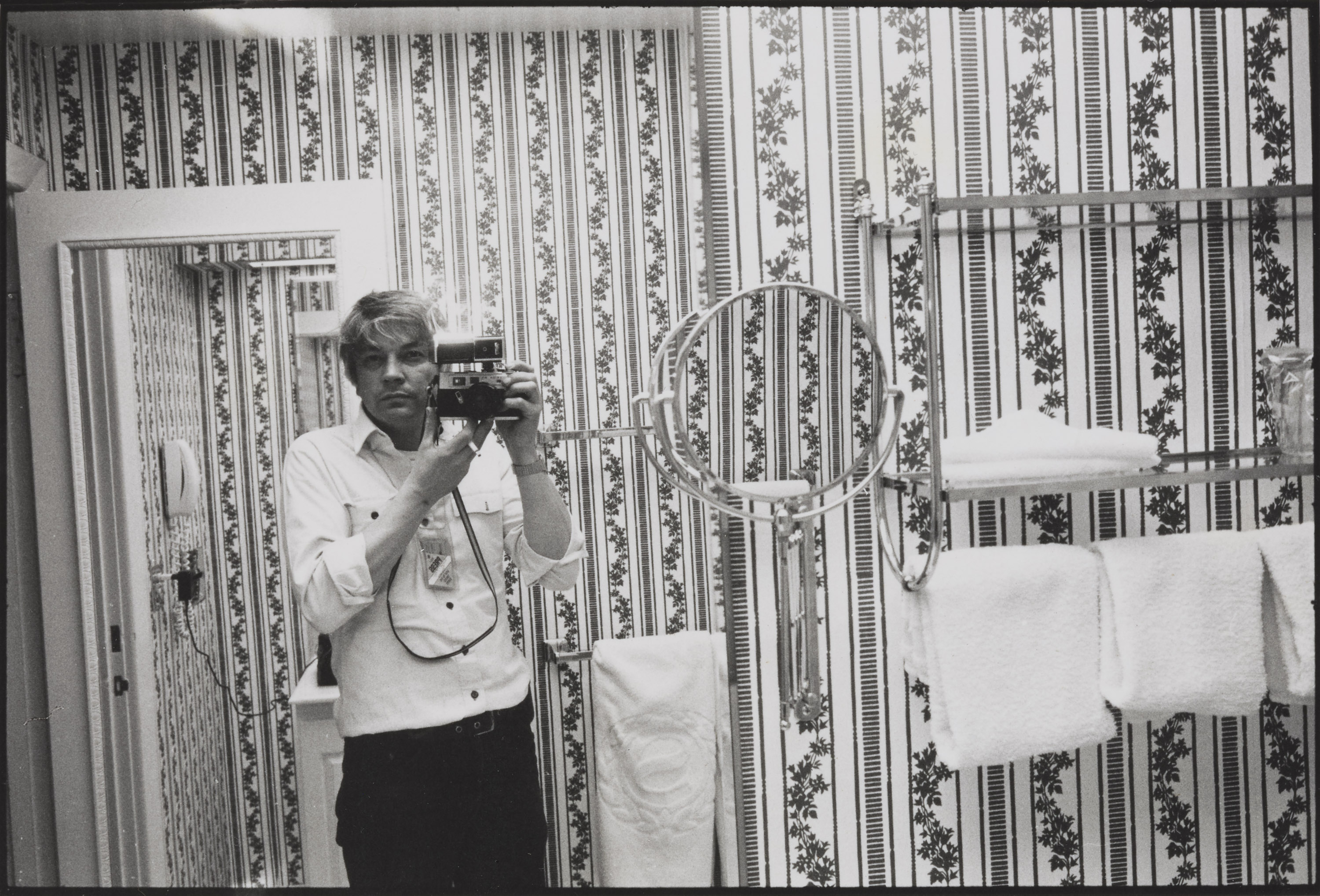
Rudi Frey -Self portrait in a hotel room

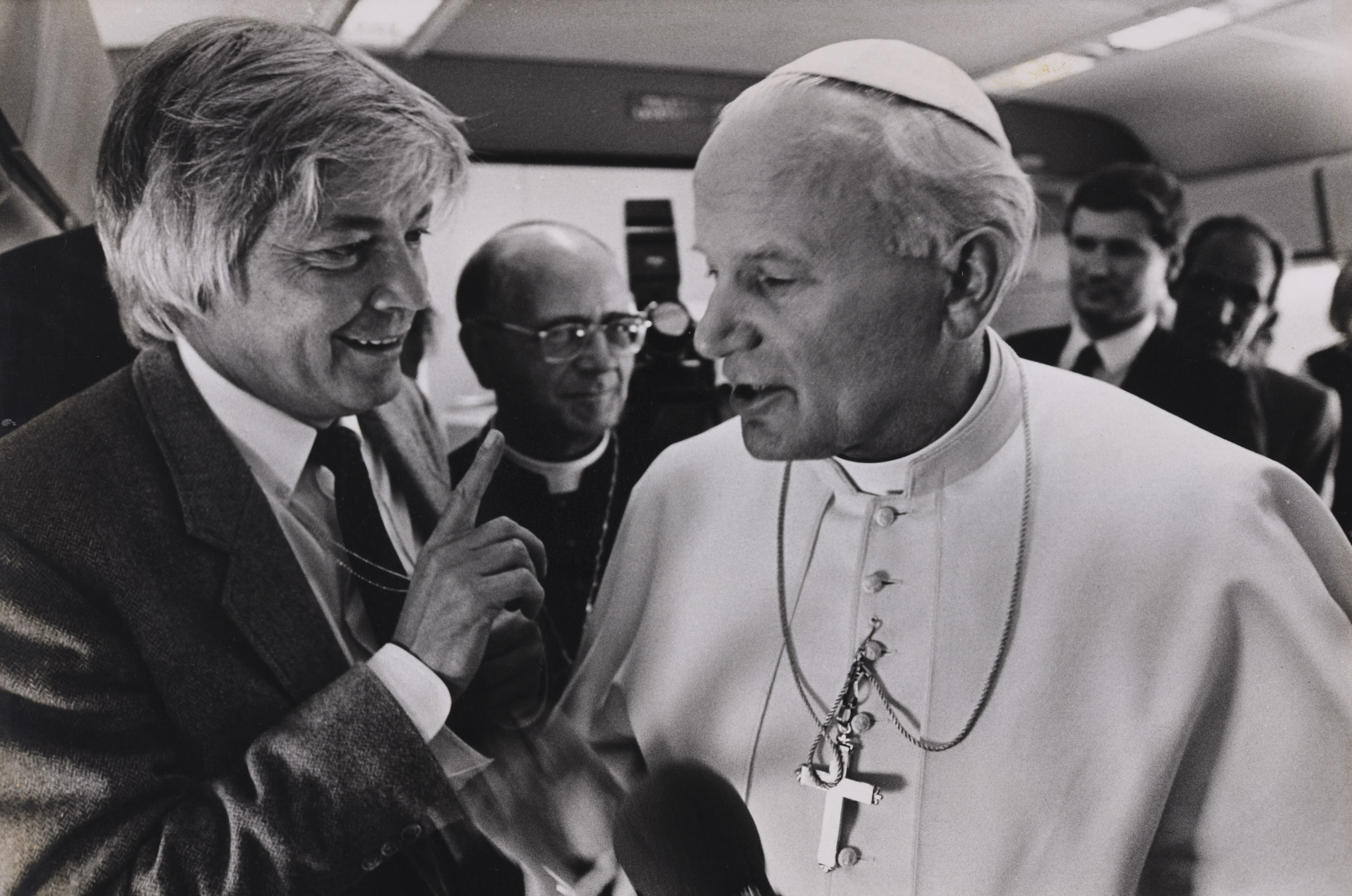
Rudi Frey with Pope John Paul II. Image taken by unknown Photographer

Rudi Frey reported from Beirut (Libanese War, 1982), Sarajevo (Winter Olympics 1984), Saudi-Arabia (1991), Kuwait (Iraqi invasion of Kuwait, 1991); he also regularly photographed in the Vatican and accompanied the pope on trips. He photographed the magazine covers of Time: 28 December 1981 (General Jaruzelski) and 9 September 1985 (Mikhail Gorbachev); Panorama: 13 November 1975 (Pier Paolo Pasolini).

For his photographic coverage from Poland in 1981, of the Solidarność movement - its beginnings, members until the proclamation of martial law – he was awarded the Robert Capa Gold Medal. His portrait of Wojciech Jaruzelski is part of the collection of the National Portrait Gallery.

Due to a donation by his heirs, Frey's photographic estate came to FOTOHOF>ARCHIV in 2019. In some books, primarily memoirs by fellow journalists and Vatican insiders, anecdotes about Rudi Frey can be found, but apart from that, very little is known about the time after he left Salzburg, about his life as a press photographer.

== Exhibitions ==
- 2022: Rudi Frey – Professione: Reporter. Fotohof, Salzburg.
