= The World of Charlie Company =

1970 CBS documentary film about the Vietnam War

The World of Charlie Company is a one-hour film documentary produced by CBS News in 1970 that shows what life was like in the jungles of South Vietnam for a rifle company of American soldiers fighting regular units of the North Vietnamese People's Army of Vietnam (PAVN).

The film was made by John Laurence, correspondent in Vietnam for CBS from 1965-70, his American camera team and a producer in New York. They spent more than five months embedded with a military unit. The photojournalist was Keith Kay, the sound technician was James L. Clevenger and the producer in New York was Russ Bensley. Dana Stone worked briefly on the film as a cameraman before being sent by CBS to Phnom Penh on 28 March to cover the aftermath of the Cambodian coup.

The documentary was broadcast in prime time on the CBS television network twice in July, 1970. It received the George Polk Memorial award of the Overseas Press Club of America for "best reporting in any medium requiring exceptional courage and enterprise abroad" as well as every major award for broadcast journalism in the United States.

== Outline ==
The documentary follows the 100+ soldiers of C (Charlie) Company, 2nd Battalion, 7th Cavalry Regiment, 1st Cavalry Division in 1970 during the Vietnam War.

The unit routinely patrols the harsh, heat-filled Vietnamese jungles in War zone C near the Cambodian border west of Saigon looking for enemy contact and supplies. The soldiers are worn down on every patrol by the exhausting conditions of heat, dense foliage and biting insects. The troops express diverse opinions about fighting the war. One soldier who opposes the war says he hasn't fired his weapon, a mortar, since arriving in South Vietnam. Others talk about killing the enemy as routine. "Killing gooks don't mean nothing," says one. The medic, a pacifist, says, "Killing for peace just don't make sense." The troops talk about their lives back in the United States that they commonly refer to as "back in the world."

The troops' company commander, Captain Robert Jackson of Sheffield, Alabama, has formed a close bond with the men and earned their respect because he is unwilling to take unnecessary chances with his soldiers' lives. He is experienced in jungle warfare and central to his tactics is never allowing his company to walk along trails in the jungle where the men can be ambushed by the PAVN. Only two soldiers have been killed under Jackson's command and he is seen as the prime reason the unit has survived so well. However, after six months in command, he suffers a cardiac problem in the field and has to be replaced.

The soldiers receive a new commander, Captain Al Rice, who orders them to walk down a trail wide enough to accommodate a motor vehicle. The men call it "a road." The night before, the soldiers had listened to a PAVN battalion of several hundred walk up the same road a short distance from their night defensive perimeter. The point squad, considered by Captain Jackson to be his best, refuses to go down the road and this leads to a revolt against Captain Rice's order. The men explain why they are refusing to walk the road. Rice criticizes his platoon leaders for not supporting his order.

Later, Charlie Company gets orders to make a combat assault into Cambodia at the start of the 1970 Cambodian Incursion. Because they are an experienced rifle company and perhaps because of their earlier rebellion, the soldiers are given the mission of attacking the command post of the PAVN in South Vietnam known as COSVN.

A detailed account of the making of the documentary appears in the Vietnam War memoir, "The Cat from Hue" by John Laurence.

== Reception ==
"It showed GIs close to mutiny, balking at orders that seemed to them unreasonable. This was something never seen on television before".

== Awards ==
The World of Charlie Company received the George Polk Memorial Award from the Overseas Press Club of America for "best reporting in any medium requiring exceptional courage and enterprise abroad." The recipients were John Laurence, Keith Kay, James Clevenger and Russ Bensley. It also received an Emmy, a Columbia DuPont and several other awards for broadcast journalism. When the Vietnam War was over, PBS chose "The World of Charlie Company" to lead off its series on the six best documentaries broadcast by CBS News about various subjects that included Edward R. Murrow's documentaries "A Report on Senator Joseph McCarthy" and "Harvest of Shame."

== See also ==
- The Anderson Platoon (documentary)
- The Mills of the Gods: Viet Nam (documentary)
- Basic Training (documentary)
