= John Sadovy =

Czech-born British photographer

- Born: Jan Sadový; 29 October 1925; Písek, Czechoslovakia
- Died: 21 December 2010 (aged 85); Chislehurst, England
- Resting place: Jablunkov, Czech Republic
- Occupations: Photographer, printer
- Spouse(s): Pamela (1953–1975), Gabrielle (1975–2010)
- Children: 2
- Website: johnsadovy.com

John Sadovy (born Jan Sadový; 29 October 1925 – 21 December 2010), was a Czech-born British photojournalist and commercial photographer particularly known for his iconic photographs of the Hungarian Revolution of 1956, published in Life and various other leading news magazines of the 1950s and early 1960s.

== Life and early recognition ==
Jan Sadový was born on 29 October 1925 in Písek, a small farming community in eastern Czechoslovakia (today Czech Republic). He was the youngest of two boys. He left school at age 14, later serving in the Polish 8th Army as a company photographer under British command in Italy. At the end of World War II, he travelled to a Polish resettlement camp in Helmsley, northern England. After demobilizing, he worked in Yorkshire and Sheffield taking portraits and wedding photos. He moved to London in 1950 to further build his portfolio and be closer to major news outlets. His first significant recognition came in 1951 with images of swans preening on Kensington Round Pond, published by Picture Post.

== Freelancing for Life and other publications ==
By 1952, Time and Life magazines regularly featured Sadovy's images and dispatched him on assignments. Throughout the 1950s and early 1960s, he freelanced for prominent magazines including Vogue (1954–1955), Paris Match, Lilliput, Stern, Photography, Sports Illustrated, and The Observer. His travels across the Middle East and Europe enabled him to cover major events, uprisings, celebrities, royalty, sportsmen, and fashion. He used a 1939 Leica (Model E) camera with a wide-angle lens, working close to subjects while remaining unobtrusive.

His work was featured in photography yearbooks (Photography Year Books, 1956–1960), the British Journal of Photography (1964), and The Image Graphics Arts Photography (1974). He was also interviewed by the BBC about photography and advertising.

== Hungarian Revolution ==
Sadovy's photographs taken during the Hungarian Revolution of 1956 in Budapest earned him international acclaim and several prestigious awards, including the Robert Capa Gold Medal.

He was cited as one of the few photojournalists to document the revolution.

Life correspondent Tim Foote, who worked with John in Budapest and Morocco, praised his calm bravery and photographic skills.

Sadovy captured 18 rolls of 35mm film over four intense days in Budapest, at the Hungarian–Austrian border, and at a refugee camp in Traiskirchen, Austria. His images have been widely analysed and featured in publications such as Cry Hungary, Les Héros de Budapest, and academic papers on Cold War photography.

== Mill House Press and later life ==
John's fresh and naturalistic photographic style proved valuable in advertising, notably winning him the Layton Trophy in 1961 for the "Drinka Pinta Milka Day" campaign. In the late 1960s, he founded Mill House Press in London, focusing on commercial photography and printing.

His work featured in exhibitions such as British Photography 1955–65 at The Photographers' Gallery in 1983, Freedom First in London (2016), and Among Freedom Fighters in Budapest (2023). After suffering multiple strokes beginning in 1983, he retired from photography. He died on 21 December 2010.

== Awards ==
- 1956 – Robert Capa Gold Medal, Overseas Press Club of America
- 1957 – 18th Annual Award – Overseas Press Club of America
- 1957 – NPPA and Encyclopedia Britannica Picture of the Year, Magazine Picture Story (1st Prize)
- 1957 – University of Missouri, 14th Annual Picture of the Year, Magazine Picture Sequence (1st Prize)
- 1957 – The Art Director's Club Medal – Special Medal Award
- 1957 – OPC Best Still Photojournalism Reporting from Abroad
- 1961 – Layton Trophy for Black and White Letterpress Advertising

== Exhibitions ==
- London 1983 – British Photography: The Master Craftsmen 1955–1965
- London 2016 – Freedom First: The 1956 Hungarian Revolution in Pictures
- 2016 – The Guardian feature 1956 Hungarian Revolution in Pictures
- Budapest 2023 – Among Freedom Fighters – Hungarian National Museum
