= Chas Gerretsen =

Dutch photographer

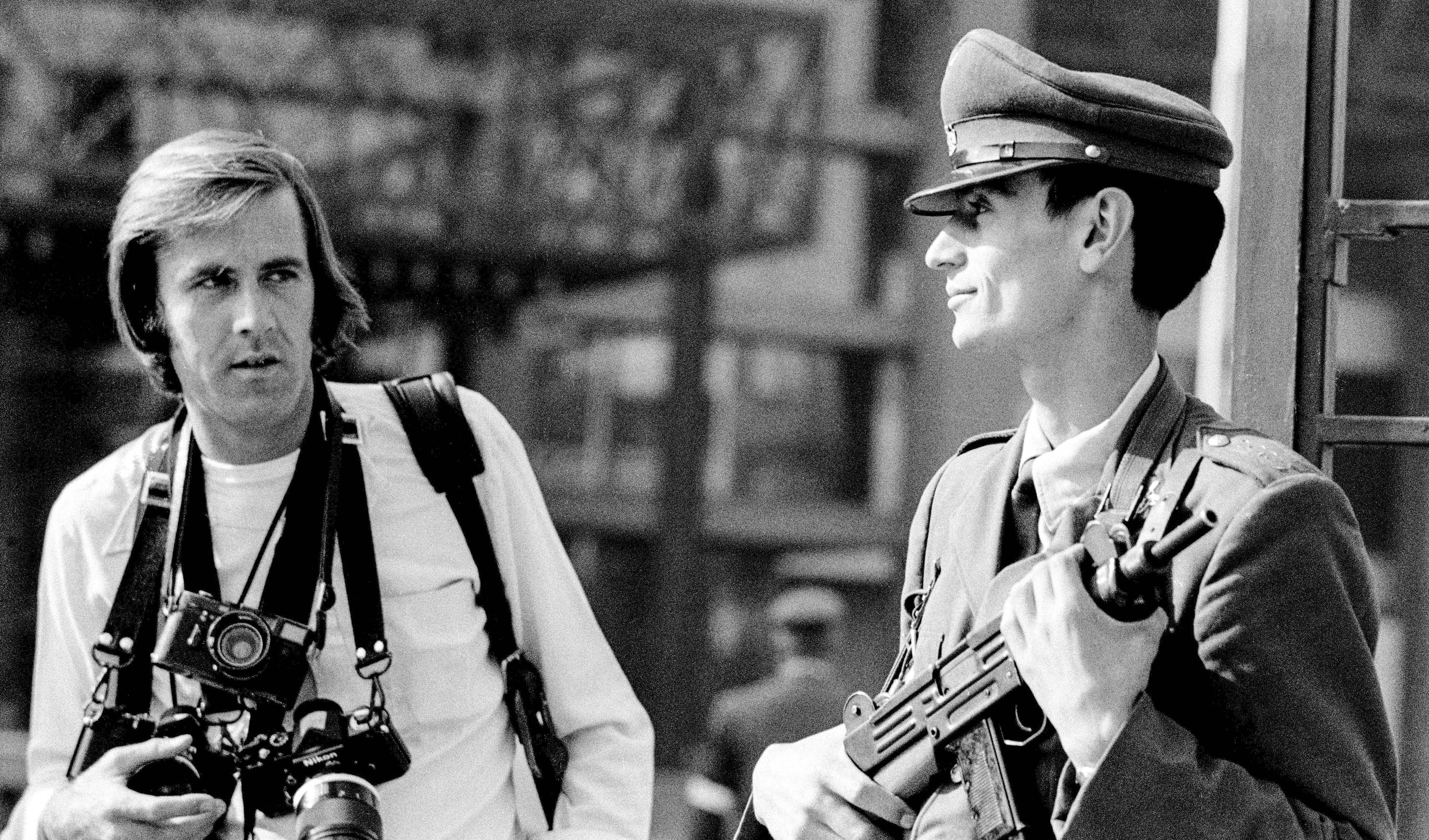
- Mutual Suspicion, Chas & Carabinero, Santiago, Chile
- Born: Charles Arthur Gerretsen; 22 July 1943 (age 83); Groningen, Netherlands
- Occupations: Photojournalism, Advertising, Documentary
- Years active: 1967–1989
- Spouse: Monika Pfandzelter
- Awards: Robert Capa Gold Medal; FELIFA Award 2023, winner Best Photobook, in International Category; Deutscher Fotobuchpreis 2024, Documentary Photography, Silver
- Website: chasgerretsen.com

Chas Gerretsen (born 22 July 1943) is a Dutch-born war photographer, photojournalist and film advertising photographer. His photographs of armed conflicts, Hollywood films and Celebrity Portraits have been published in major magazines.

== Life ==
Gerretsen left the Netherlands at the age of sixteen and after travelling through Europe for two years, immigrated to Australia in 1961. He first started to take pictures while working as a crocodile hunter in Cape York Peninsula, (Queensland, Australia)

In 1963 he immigrated to the U.S.A., landing in San Pedro, California, and while working as a cowboy in Falfurrias, Texas, bought a movie camera and shot his first film footage.

In 1967 he arrived in Singapore and hitch-hiked through Malaysia to Bangkok, (Thailand) and via Kanchanaburi to the Three Pagodas Pass where he spent three months with the pro-U Nu Burmese rebels under the command of General Bo Yan Naing. He traveled through Laos, Cambodia and entered South Vietnam, on 14 February 1968 with the equivalent of US $0.75 in his pocket.

In 1969, he left South Vietnam and in 1970 covered the devastating 1970 Bhola cyclone in East Pakistan before returning to Europe. From 1970 to 1975, Gerretsen would continue to photograph war, political upheavals, elections, droughts and conflicts in Cambodia, South Vietnam, Chile, Argentina, Colombia, Venezuela, Dominican Republic and Peru.

Between 1975 and 1989 he lived in Hollywood, working on feature films in, as well as outside the USA.

At the end of 1989 Gerretsen had had enough, he sold everything, his house, his studio and his cameras and bought a 44 ft sailboat. And for the next 33 years he went sailing—financially surviving with occasional paid charters. While sailing he wrote his autobiography and published several photo books.

== Vietnam (1968–1969) ==
On 14 February 1968, (during the Tet Offensive) he walked from Cambodia into South Vietnam (via Gò Dầu Ha) and soon thereafter started his career as a freelance photojournalist and cinematographer. He became friends with Dana Stone and his wife Louise and acquired his first Nikon F camera with a 105 mm lens from Dana as well as his first lessons in what not to do when out on patrol.

In April 1968, he became a staff cameraman for UPITN but after one month had enough of being told what to do and became a freelance cameraman for ABC TV and as a freelance photojournalist sold his still negatives to Time Life, Newsweek and U.P.I.

At the end of 1968 and beginning 1969, there was a relative quiet in South Vietnam and Gerretsen as well as many of the other "resident" war photographers, left (among others: Sean Flynn and Dana Stone), only to return upon the American invasion of Cambodia.

== Cambodia (1970–1972) ==
In 1970, when hearing of the American invasion of Cambodia Gerretsen bought a train ticket in Paris on the Orient Express to Istanbul, Turkey, and traveled on by bus through Iran, Afghanistan (Khyber Pass) to West Pakistan and from there, he flew to Phnom Penh, Cambodia. While in Cambodia, he continued working freelance and in addition started contributing articles (under the pseudonym of Bill Steiner) to the Copley News Service.

In 1972, he joined the French photo agency Gamma.

== Chile (1973) ==
General Augusto Pinochet, Sept. 1973 (Fiestas Patrias, Iglesia de la Gratitud Nacional in Santiago)

In 1973 he won the Robert Capa Gold Medal with David Burnett and Raymond Depardon. He is best known for his coverage of the 1973 Chilean coup d'état. His famous photograph of General Pinochet became the embodiment of the Latin American Dictator, the opposite side of the political spectrum to Alberto Korda photograph of Che Gueverra (Guerrillero Heroico).

The image of General Pinochet has an unusual history: it was used on posters, flyers and banners and was often reworked to portray the general as an inhuman monster. And over the years continued to be used by various political factions to illustrate the perceived inhumanity of some political leaders.

In 1982 a couple of art student in Concepción copied Gerretsen's photo of general Pinochet with the premonitory message, "NINGUNA CALLE LLEVARA SU NOMBRE" (No street will bear your name) It was plastered on walls on the evening before the days of national protests.

The first time Gerretsen photographed General Pinochet, unwittingly, was on 29 June 1973 during the failed "Coup d'Etat", known as El Tancazo, which the general, ironically, helped put down.

The images taken by Gerretsen on 11 September 1973 were used in the initial concept of the reconstruction of the coup d'état in the film The House of the Spirits based on the novel of the same name by Isabel Allende, a niece of the former president Salvador Allende.

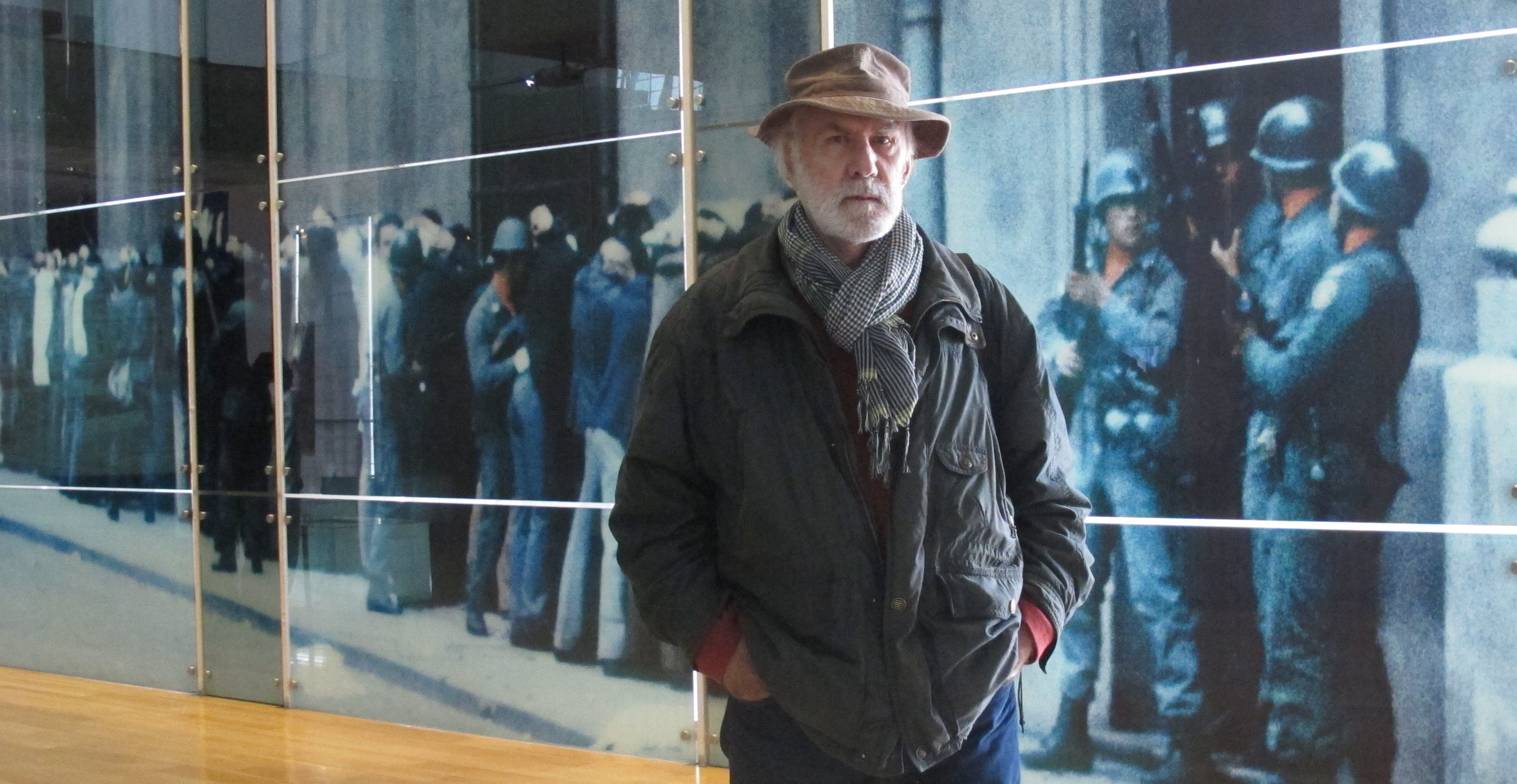
Chas Gerretsen in front of one of his best known images of the 1973 "Coup d'Etat", of which three are etched into a glass wall separating the halls in the "Museo de la Memoria y los Derechos Humanos" in Santiago, Chile. The walls were donated, in 2010, by the Dutch Government/Citizenry to the museum.

== Hollywood (1975–1989) ==
In 1975, while visiting Gamma offices in Paris, wondering where to go next, a fellow Gamma photographer suggested, sarcastically, "why don't you go and find yourself a war in Hollywood."

In June 1975, Chas started the Hollywood office for Gamma and in 1977 co-founded the photo agency Mega Productions Inc. In 1976 he was hired as the still photographer/special photographer for the war film Apocalypse Now.

Apart from his still photographs, his contribution to the film was the suggestion, during a lunch with Francis Ford Coppola regarding the scene where a TV correspondent (played by Coppola) yells at some passing soldiers, "Don't look at the camera." "..that if Francis wanted to mock TV correspondents in South Vietnam he should create a photojournalist because, "we were all crazy."

A couple of days later, after the arrival of Dennis Hopper, Gerretsen was asked by Jerry Ziesmer to report to Coppola: "on how to dress a combat photographer." From that moment on the role of Dennis Hopper as head honcho (Captain Colby) for Colonel Kurtz (Marlon Brando) was changed into that of a photojournalist. Gerretsen sold three of his old Nikon F]cameras with lenses to American Zoetrope and they were used by Dennis Hopper in the film. These cameras are now on display in Coppola Winery Movie Museum, in Geyserville, California

Lee Beaupre, publicist for "Apocalypse Now " until his murder in 1979, wrote in a publicity release on Gerretsen as a war photographer for Apocalypse Now, "From Real to Reel". "His (Chas Gerretsen's) photographic career had come full circle." The release was later withdrawn since it was decided that Sean Flynn, son of actor Errol Flynn had more publicity value.

In 1984 Gerretsen produced and directed a one-hour documentary "The Longest Holiday" a view on the Joys of Aging in Sun City, Arizona which was bought by RAI, ORTF and the BBC. During his time in Hollywood, he worked as a "special advertising and publicity photographer" on over a hundred feature films.

After leaving the French photo agency Gamma over 80.000 of his photographic negatives and slides were missing, including many from Chile. The remainder of his files, his negatives and slides are now stored in the archives of the Netherlands Photo Museum.

== Rediscovery ==
In June 2019, KINO Rotterdam made a short (32 min) documentary about Gerretsen's life and the images he had taken during the six months he worked as a still photographer on Apocalypse Now. The documentary was chosen for participation in the Il Cinema Ritrovato in Bologna, Italy. "The Dutch Angle: Chas Gerretsen & Apocalypse Now" created a lot of interest and was included in the Blu-ray release of 'Apocalypse Now Final Cut'. Gerretsen's photographs were 're-discovered' in 2020. A 256-page photobook, Apocalypse Now, The Lost Archives, with many never-before-published photographs, taken during his six-months stay on the set in the Philippines, was published by Prestel/Pinguin/Random House. The book was released worldwide in September 2021.

A retrospective exhibition of his work and life was exhibited 16 October 2021 – 8 May 2022 at the Nederlands Fotomuseum in Rotterdam. A 256 page catalogue, in English and Dutch, accompanied the exhibition.

In addition, his autobiography was released in the Netherlands on 11 September 2021, to excellent reviews by all the major Dutch newspapers.

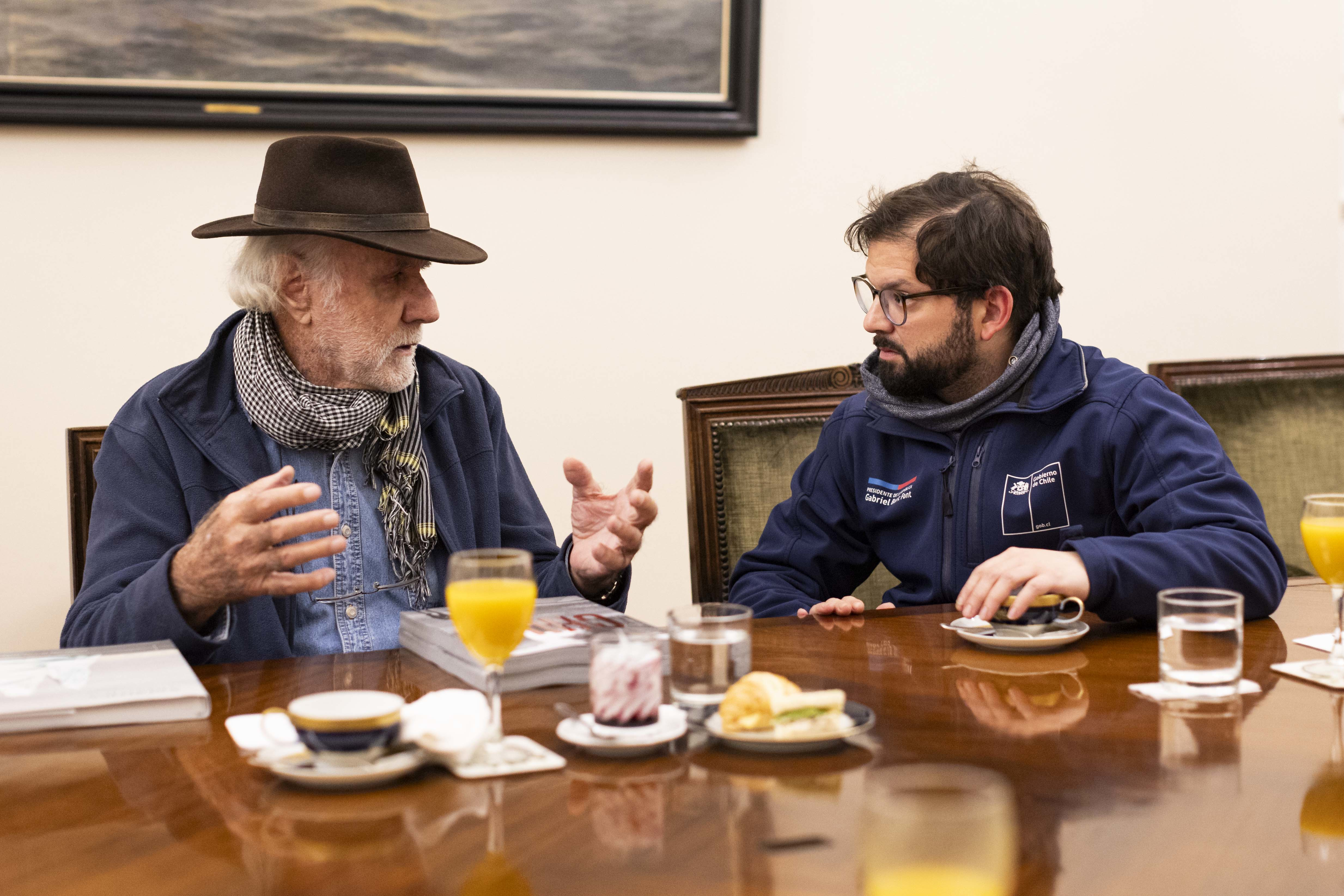
Gerretsen with Chilean President Gabriel Boric

In 2023, after several years of negotiations and with the help of the Dutch Embassy in Chile and others, the Chile part of his photo exhibition was moved to the Museum of Memory and Human Rights in Santiago and renamed: "Rebobinar, reimaginar, reportar" (Rewind, reimagine, report). In time for the commemoration of 50 years after the coup d'état of September 11, 1973: an exhibition of more than 800 of the images captured by the Dutch photographer in Chile in the months before, during and after the coup d'état, many of them never published before. At the emotional opening of his exhibition on August 18, he also introduced his photobook, 'Chile El archivo fotográfico 1973-74 (Chile The Photographic Archive 1973-74) Which became the number 1 non-fiction bestseller in Chile from 21-27 September, 2023.

On November 11, 2023 the Spanish edition of "Chile the Photo Archive 1973-74" received the FELIFA International Award for the best published photobook. The book will be exhibited in over a dozen locations throughout Latin America in 2024/25.

On July 4, 2025 Hicks of @developingTank published a 12 minute documentary on the highlights of Chas Gerretsen's career on YouTube. https://www.youtube.com/watch?v=jr9_A8Jwh_k

== Publications ==
- Apocalypse Now: The Lost Photo Archive (2021) English. ISBN 978-3791388083.
- Starring Chas Gerretsen (2021) English. ISBN 978-9462264069. Catalogue, published with the retrospective exhibition at the Nederlands Fotomuseum. With an essay by curator Iris Sikking.
- In de Hoofdrol Chas Gerretsen (2021) Dutch. Exhibition catalogue. With contributions by Iris Sikking, Gerretsen, Birgit Donker, Hedy van Erp, Markha Valenta, and Wilco Versteeg. ISBN 978-9462264090.
- Het wonderbaarlijke en vreemde leven van Chas Gerretsen (2021) Dutch. ISBN 978-9024434473. The autobiography was originally written in English (The marvelous and strange life of Chas Gerretsen) and translated into Dutch.
- Chile. El archivo fotográfico 1973-74 (2023) Spanish. ISBN 978-84-19233-62-2.
- Chile The Photo Archive 1973/74 (2023) English. ISBN 978-9462264847. A visual memory of Santiago of what life was like during the tumultuous year of 1973, the violent military overthrow of the democratically elected President Salvador Allende on September 11. And one year after, under the military junta of Gen. Augusto Pinochet.
- REAL to REEL: What I Saw and What Saw Me (2026) English ISBN 978-3-9829379-0-8. EPUB Chas Gerretsen's autobiography (2026-09-15) English Illustrated with 148 images.

== Literature ==
- Gerretsen, Chas. In: Wim van Sinderen et al.: Fotografen in Nederland : een anthologie 1852–2002. Ludion, Amsterdam; Fotomuseum, Den Haag 2002, ISBN 90-76588-35-X, S. 124–125.
- Veronica Hekking: Een foto als voertuig van de macht. Gebruik en hergebruik van Chas Gerretsens portret van Augusto Pinochet. In: Nelke Bartelings et al. (Hrsg.): Beelden in veelvoud. De vermenigvuldiging van het beeld in prentkunst en fotografie. Leids Kunsthistorisch Jaarboek 12, Leiden 2002, S. 409–426.
