= Landing Zone Hereford =

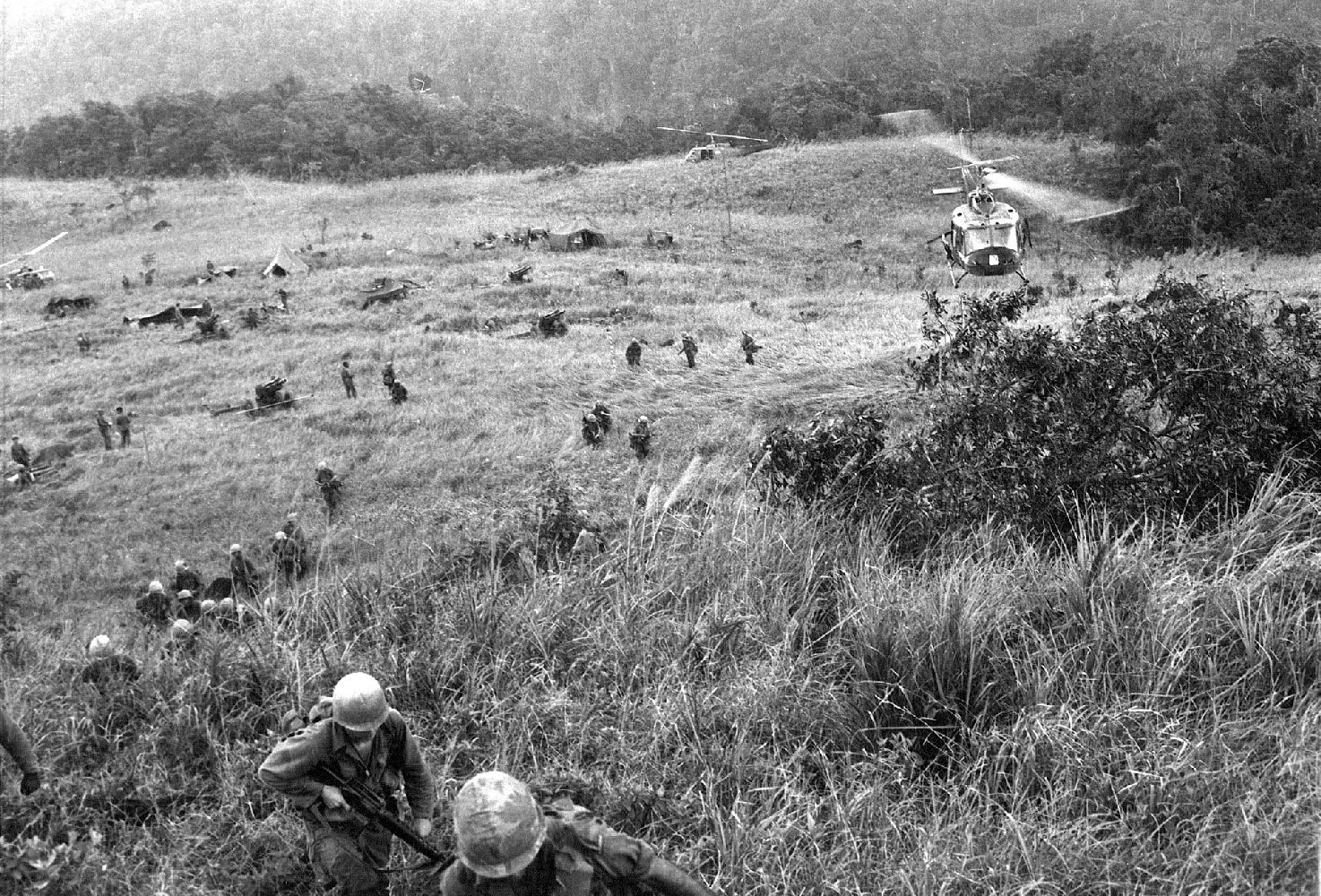
- American soldiers fan out from Landing Zone Hereford

Location
- Coordinates: 14.1297°N 108.831°E

Site history
- Built: 1966
- In use: 1966
- Battles/wars: Vietnam War

Garrison information
- Occupants: 1st Cavalry Division

Landing Zone Hereford was a U.S. Army base located northeast of Vĩnh Thạnh District, Bình Định in central Vietnam.

== History ==
Hereford was established by the 1st Cavalry Division on 21 May 1966 during Operation Crazy Horse and was located approximately 6m northeast of Vĩnh Thạnh and 26 km northeast of An Khê

On 22 May the under-strength mortar platoon of Company C 1st Battalion, 12th Cavalry was left on Hereford while the Company's rifle platoons searched the valley below. The mortar platoon was hit by People's Army of Vietnam (PAVN) mortars and then overrun by PAVN who killed 15 out of 21 men in the platoon within 35 minutes, withdrawing as the rifle platoons rushed back to Hereford. Also killed at Hereford was Look Magazine correspondent Sam Castan while leading three members of the mortar team to safety, an act of courage for which he was awarded an Army Commendation Medal posthumously by the commander of U.S. forces, General William Westmoreland.

== Current use ==
The base is abandoned and has returned to jungle.
