= John Olson (photographer) =

American photographer

John Olson (born 1947) is an American photographer, former combat photographer and Robert Capa Gold Medal winner for his photographs of the Battle of Hue during the Vietnam War. His photograph of a tank on which a group of wounded marines are piled is considered one of the most emblematic images of the conflict.

== Battle of Hue ==
While working as a combat photographer for Star and Stripes newspaper, Olson took a series of photographs of the Battle of Hue fighting while following the 1st Battalion, 5th Marine Regiment trying to take back the city. The photographs were published by Stars and Stripes and also in Life magazine. It is often attributed to the rawness of his images that they played a significant role in America's subsequent withdrawal from the Vietnam War. Olson was awarded the Robert Capa Gold Medal in 1968 for this work, for his "exceptional courage and initiative".
