= Nik Wheeler =

British-born photographer (born 1939)

Nik Wheeler (born 1939) is a British-born photographer, known for taking what for years was the only known photograph of Carlos the Jackal. He began his career as a photojournalist during the Vietnam War.

Wheeler was born in Hitchin, England in 1939. He was a war photographer for United Press International in Vietnam, and he photographed the fall of Saigon for Newsweek. He moved to Beirut, Lebanon in the early 1970s and freelanced throughout the Middle East for a number of European magazines. He is the co-founder of Traveler's Companion Guides, based in California.

== Personal life ==
Wheeler has been married to American actress Pamela Bellwood since 1984. He lives in Santa Barbara, California.
