= Charles Chellapah =

Singaporean photojournalist (1940–1966)

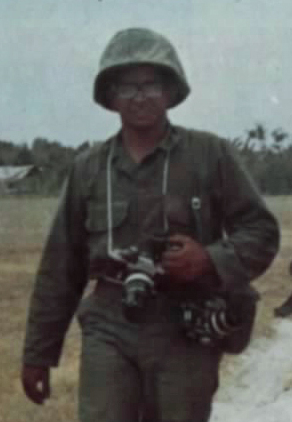
- Chellapah in Saigon on 9 February 1966, five days before his death
- Born: Chellapah s/o Canagaratnam; 2 May 1940; Singapore, Straits Settlements
- Died: 14 February 1966 (aged 25); Củ Chi, Saigon, South Vietnam
- Cause of death: Killed by claymore mine
- Other names: Charles; Charlie
- Occupation: Photojournalist

Chellapah s/o Canagaratnam (Note: Sometimes spelt as "Chellappah".) (2 May 1940 – 14 February 1966), also known as Charles Chellapah, was a Singaporean photojournalist for the Associated Press (AP) who was killed on assignment during the Vietnam War. Born in Singapore in the Straits Settlements, Chellapah studied at Monk's Hill Primary School and Gan Eng Seng School, becoming a reporter and freelance photographer after completing his education.

He worked with the Singapore Free Press and The Malayan Times, before joining AP as a freelance photographer. Chellapah then travelled to Saigon to report on the Vietnam War in the mid-1960s, but was killed by a claymore mine on 14 February 1966. Chellapah was one of three Singaporean journalists that were killed during the war. His photographs were featured in an exhibition that honoured journalists killed during the Vietnam War and his name is on the Reporters Memorial in Bayeux, France.

== Biography ==
=== Early life and career ===
Chellapah was born on 2 May 1940, the fourth of ten children. Of Sri Lankan descent, Chellapah's father worked as a water district supervisor in the City Council. Chellapah was born in Singapore, when it was a part of the Straits Settlements. In a 1997 Straits Times article, photographer Tay Kay Chin initially reported that Chellapah was born in the Dutch East Indies, but corrected himself in 2020. Known to be adventurous in his youth, Chellapah studied at Monk's Hill Primary School and Gan Eng Seng School.

After completing his secondary education, he joined the Singapore Free Press as a sports reporter and usually reported on soccer matches. He additionally taught himself photography and became a freelance photographer. Chellapah then moved to Malaya, working for The Malayan Times in Kuala Lumpur and subsequently for the Sabah Daily Express in Sabah. He was also a sportsman and participated in local Grand Prix races. Prior to covering the Vietnam War, Chellapah also worked in Hong Kong. While there, he grew interested in covering the war and joined the Associated Press (AP) as a freelance photographer.

=== Vietnam War and death ===
Chellapah arrived in Saigon, South Vietnam, on 21 January, in either 1965 or 1966. (Note: Nag 2016, p. 30, states that he arrived in 1965, while Tay 1997, ¶5, reported that it was 1966. Toh 2013, ¶11, interviewed Chellapah's brother, but he was uncertain and admitted that "the family was out of touch with him".) He followed American soldiers through jungles filled with Viet Cong (VC) tunnels. His parents were surprised to hear that he had travelled to Vietnam to cover the war. He took close-up photographs of casualties and combat, prompting his AP photo editor Horst Faas to warn him to be more cautious. On 14 February, Chellapah accompanied American soldiers to Củ Chi, northwest of Saigon, on a road-clearing mission. Củ Chi's dense forests were known to have multiple VC snipers and tunnels, and was termed "Hell's Half Acre". During the mission, a VC claymore mine was set off, injuring many. Chellapah, the company's commander, and a medic went to tend to the wounded before a second mine exploded, killing everyone instantly. The last photograph he took was of an American soldier holding a fellow wounded soldier. Faas reported Chellapah's death to the company's president.

== Aftermath and legacy ==
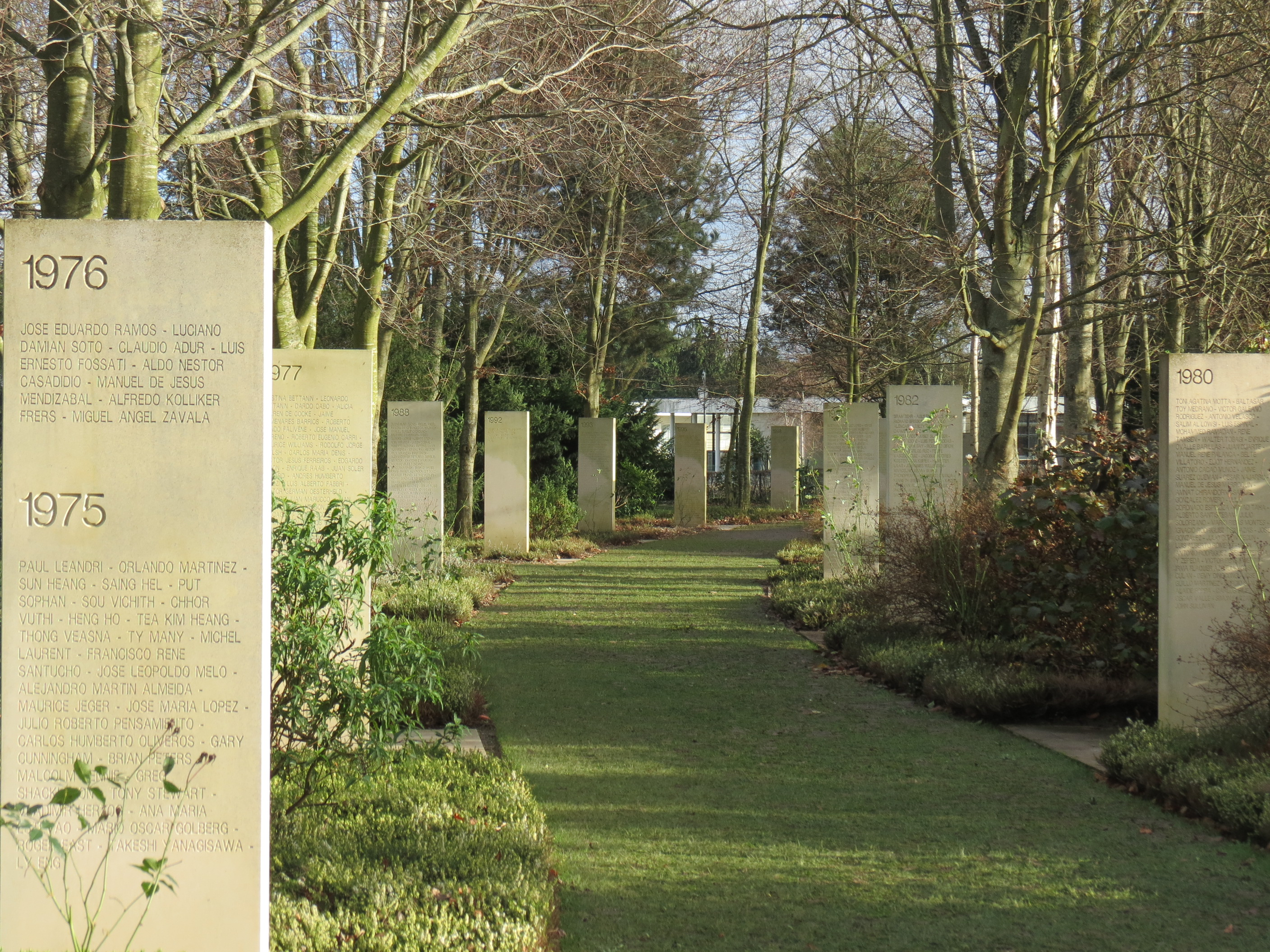
Chellapah's name is listed on the Reporters Memorial (pictured)

AP flew his body back to Singapore, where a funeral was held for him in Woodlands. Chellapah was later cremated and his ashes were scattered at sea off Bedok. His family first learnt of his death on a Tamil-language broadcast on Radio Singapore; an article by Shirlene Noordin suggests that it was instead the BBC World Service. Chellapah was the third AP photographer that died during the war in less than a year. He was one of four journalists from Singapore that covered the Vietnam War, alongside Terence "Terry" Khoo, Sam Kai Faye, and Chin Kah Chong. Khoo and Sam were killed during the war; they were both shot to death by snipers on 21 July 1972. Chellapah could have met Khoo, Sam, or Chin in South Vietnam – as they were all there around the same time – but there is no evidence to suggest he did.

A month after his funeral, a letter he sent to his family detailing his plans to travel to Hong Kong and get insurance arrived, along with his intention to return to Singapore a month earlier and set up a photo-agency business. Chellapah's photographs were featured internationally in newspapers covering the Vietnam War. In 1997, photographs by Chellapah, Khoo, and Sam were among those featured at an exhibition titled Requiem at the Newseum in Arlington, Virginia, which honoured journalists killed during the Vietnam War. A book of the same name was launched at the exhibition, that was edited by Faas and photographer Tim Page, which featured Chellapah's photographs. Requiem was later exhibited in Singapore in 2007.

Chellapah, Khoo, and Sam are also named on the Reporters Memorial in Bayeux, France, which was established by Reporters Without Borders in 2007 to commemorate journalists killed since the 1944 D-Day landings. Chellapah is in the 1966 section, though reporter Toh Yong Chuan wrote that his name was misspelt as "Charles Chellappah", as of 2013. In an interview by Toh with Chellapah's brother, C. Tharmalingam, he said that he believed Chellapah was killed by a sniper as "his body was clean – no injury at all." Tharmalingam also considered Chellapah someone who was "driven by a strong sense of purpose" and "destined to be at the heart of the action," with "the battle ground [seeming] to him where the action was".

== See also ==
- List of journalists killed and missing in the Vietnam War
