= Art Greenspon =

American war photographer (born 1942)

- Born: Arthur Greenspon; 1942 (age 83–84)
- Occupations: War photographer, social worker
- Years active: 1968–2007

Arthur Greenspon (born 1942) is an American retired photographer, notable for his coverage of the Vietnam War. Greenspon went to the war as a stringer for United Press International after selling his car to fund the air fare. He covered the Battle of Khe Sanh and Battle of Huế in early 1968 before being caught in an ambush in the jungle. A photograph Greenspon took of the arrival of a medical evacuation helicopter was published on the front page of The New York Times and has been called the "best photo from the war". Greenspon was wounded in May 1968 while covering fighting in Saigon and, finding he was unable to continue as a photographer, returned to the US. He afterwards worked for The New York Times and for New York's Channel 13. After leaving the media industry because of poor pay he studied for a degree and began a career in Wall Street finance. After his retirement he retrained as a social worker to work with military veterans.

== Early life ==
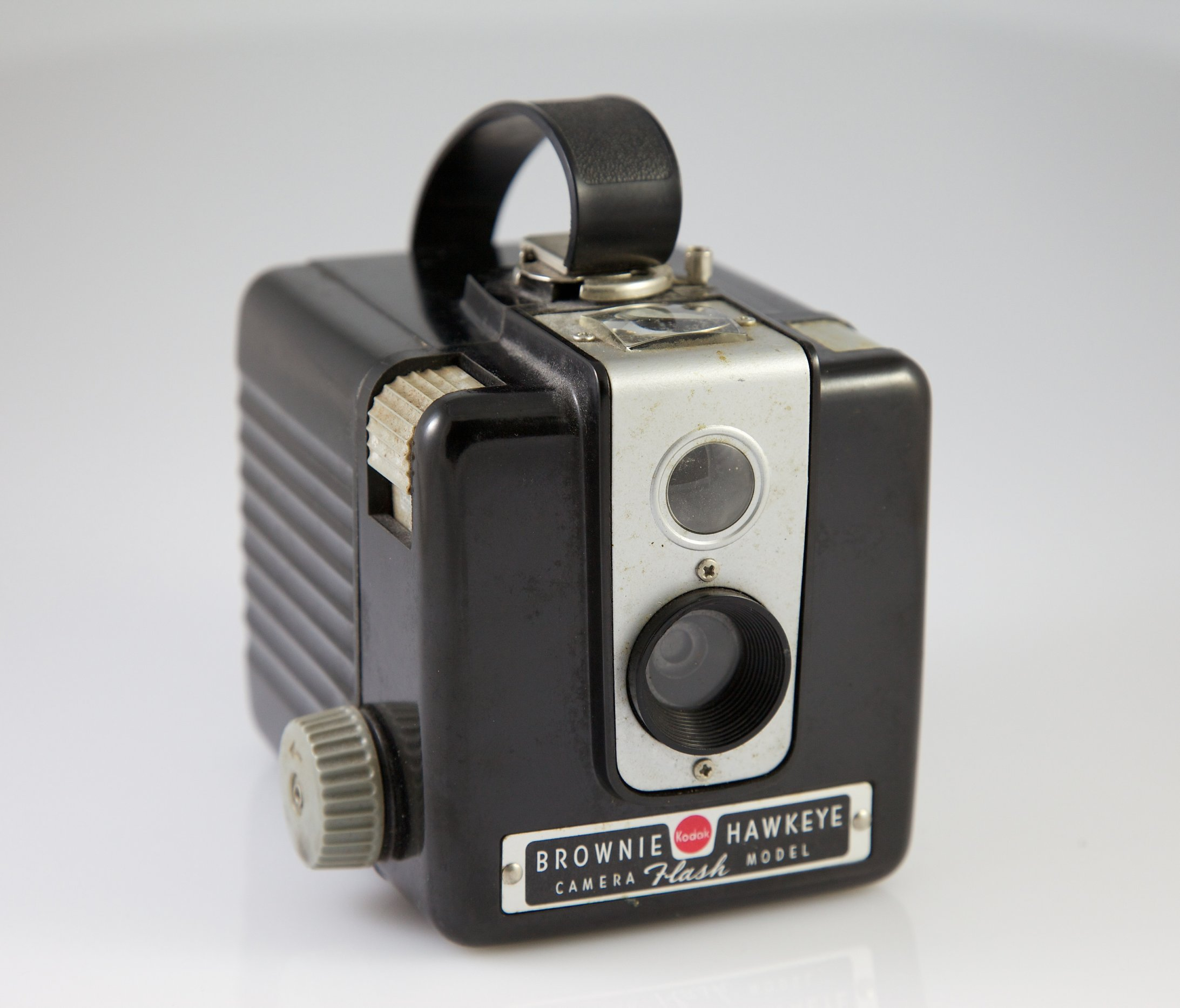
A Kodak Brownie Hawkeye produced c. 1950

Greenspon's father served in the American military during World War II and returned from the front with a Zeiss Ikon camera. Greenspon was fascinated by the camera but his father did not allow him to use it, instead purchasing a Kodak Brownie Hawkeye for Greenspon. He made much use of the Brownie as a child, converting his home's downstairs bathroom into a darkroom.

Greenspon found work as a reporter for the WCBS-TV station but wanted a career in photography and quit to become a darkroom assistant on lower pay. Through photographer Tim Page he was introduced to Bill Snead at United Press International (UPI). Snead agreed to give Greenspon work as a stringer if he could get to Vietnam to cover the Vietnam War. Greenspon sold his Volkswagen Beetle for $600 to fund a one-way ticket to Saigon where he arrived on Christmas Day 1967.

== Vietnam ==
Greenspon covered the Battle of Khe Sanh and Battle of Huế in early 1968. On March 31, 1968, he joined a company of the 101st Airborne Division in the A Sầu Valley near the border with Laos, arriving by a helicopter-borne ammunition delivery. The company was intended to carry out a two-day patrol in the jungle. It was ambushed while moving through a patch of dense elephant grass. The American casualties were so high that Greenspon chose not to take any photographs of the immediate aftermath. Bad weather delayed the helicopter evacuation of the wounded until the next day.

External image
- Help From Above
- Image hosted by Associated Press

The following morning Greenspon was near the landing site for the helicopter. The company's first sergeant was directing the helicopter to land, with raised arms, while medics assisted the wounded towards the landing site and, near to Greenspon, a wounded man lay on his back. Without time to prepare his Nikon camera Greenspon quickly took three photographs. He left on the next helicopter, carrying the bodies of men killed in the ambush.

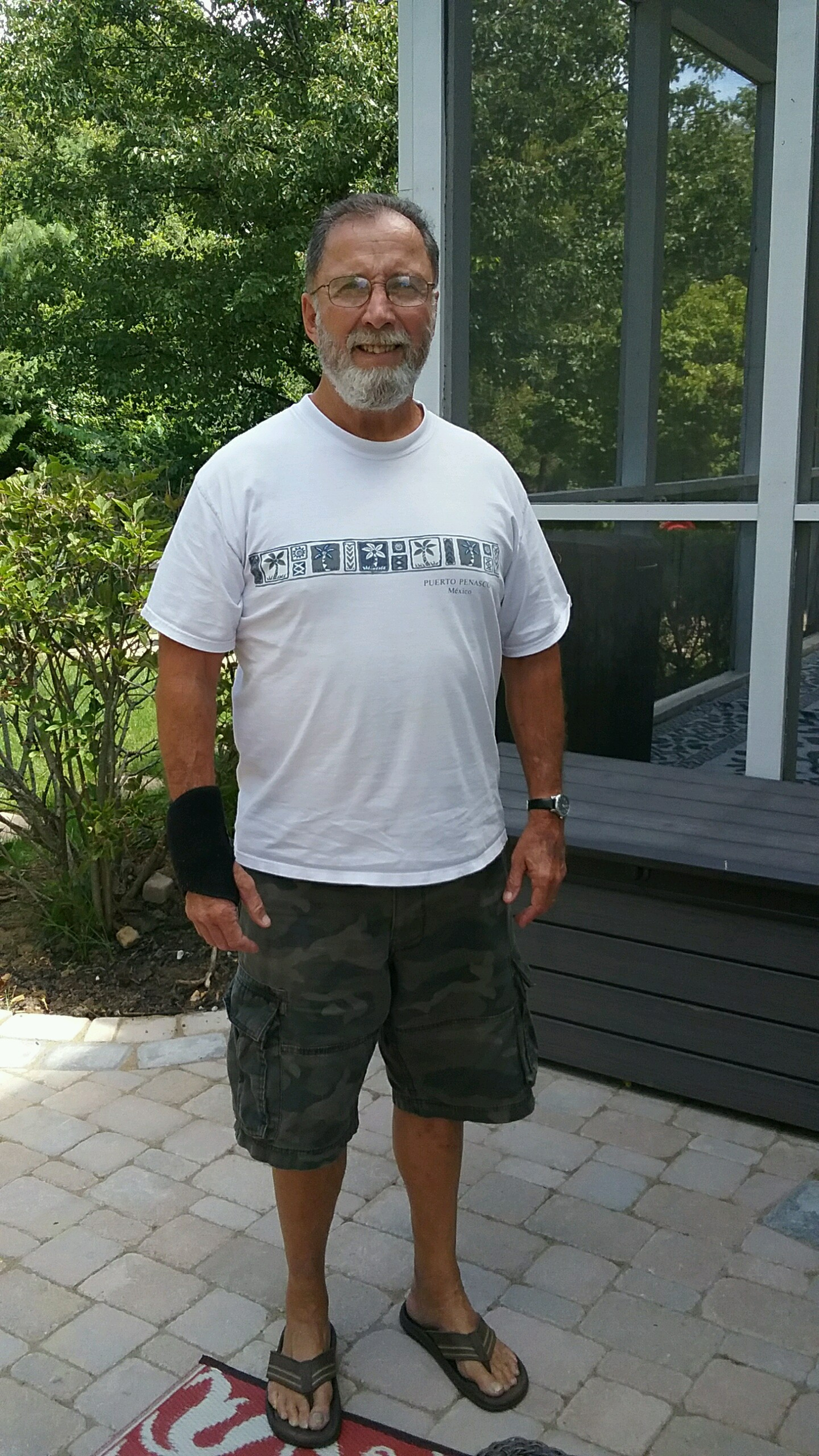
Tim Wintenburg

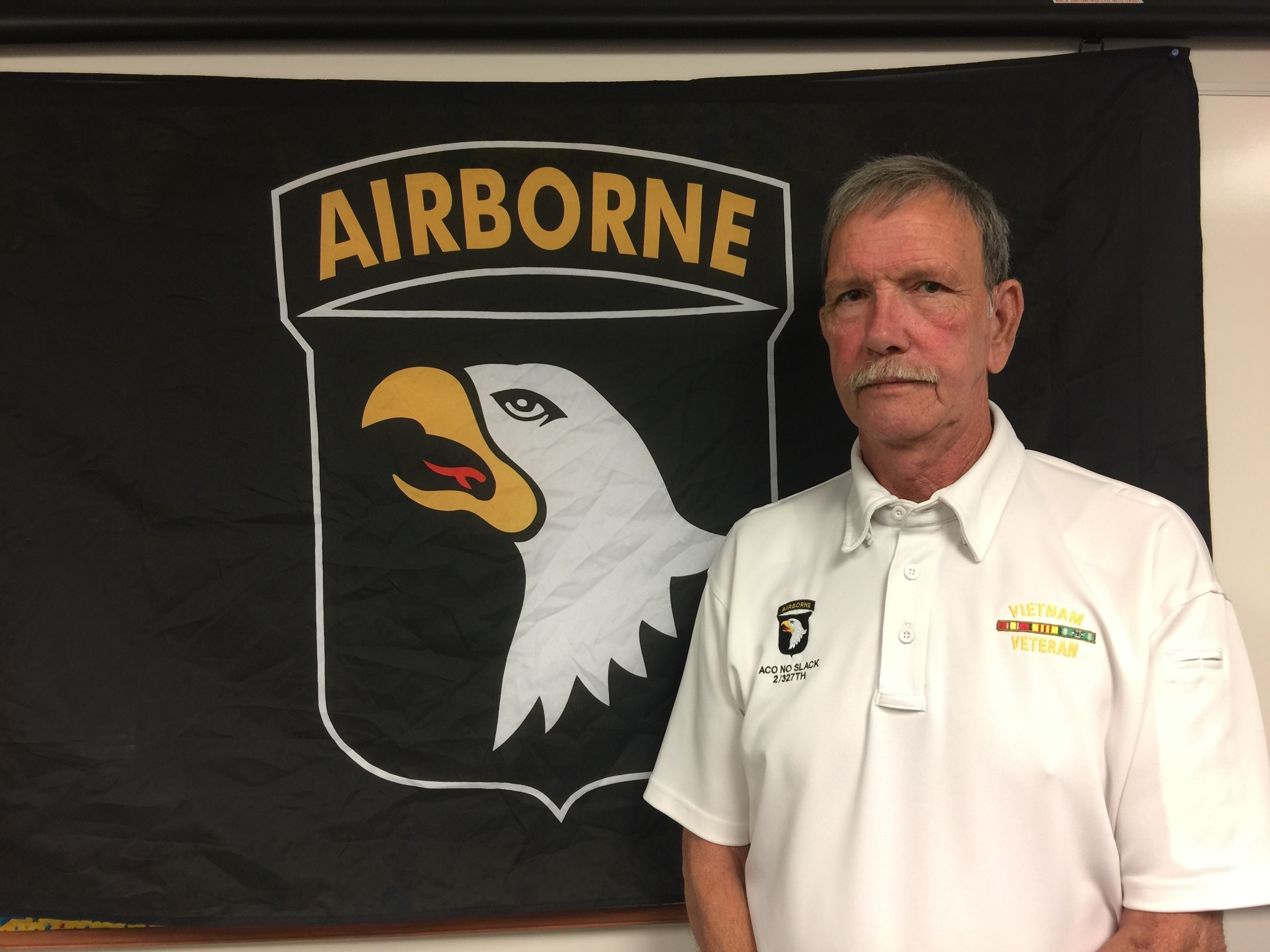
Dallas Brown

Two veterans who were in the Help From Above photo, portrayed in 2017. In the photo Wintenburg was carrying a comrade, and Brown was lying on the ground, wounded.

When he returned to base Greenspon found that his camera had become damp and the film had seized within it. Most of the film was unusable but some of the later photographs were saved, including those of the evacuation. One of the photographs, later titled Help From Above, was published on the front page of The New York Times. It has been called the "best photo from the war"; it was nominated for a Pulitzer Prize and was featured in the 2017 documentary The Vietnam War.

In May 1968, during Operation Toan Thang I, an American-led offensive against North Vietnamese and Viet Cong forces in Saigon, Greenspon was wounded in the face by a spent shell at Tan Son Nhut. The bullet that struck Greenspon had passed through photojournalist Co Rentmeester's hand. In the same engagement UPI photographer Charles Eggleston was killed. Greenspon was left with the round lodged in his sinus cavity and American military surgeons removed it from inside his mouth by breaking his cheekbone, to minimise scarring. Greenspon almost died from dysentery and fever after the operation. He tried to resume photography after the injury but found his hands trembling so badly he could not shoot. The magazine Life paid his hospital bills and Greenspon returned to the US after bribing South Vietnamese immigration officials (he had been working illegally in Vietnam, as he held only a 10-day tourist visa).

== Return to the US ==
After his return to the US Greenspon worked as a photographer for the New York Times from 1968 to 1971. He afterwards worked for New York's Channel 13 as a segment producer on their news program The 51st State. He left media because of financial difficulties and went on to drive a cab and work in sales. After achieving a bachelor of arts degree at night school Greenspon worked in finance on Wall Street through a graduate training program. He became a portfolio manager in a number of private banks before retiring in 2007. In 2011, at the age of 69, Greenspon was awarded a masters degree in clinical social work and went on to work with military veterans suffering from post-traumatic stress disorder and addiction.
