= Dickey Chapelle =

American photojournalist (1919–1965)

- Chapelle at the Don Phuc command post on the Vietnamese–Cambodian border, 1964
- Born: Georgette Louise Meyer; March 14, 1919; Milwaukee, Wisconsin U.S.
- Died: November 4, 1965 (aged 46) near Chu Lai, Quảng Ngãi province, South Vietnam
- Burial place: Forest Home Cemetery
- Education: Massachusetts Institute of Technology
- Occupation: Photojournalist
- Years active: 1941–1965

Georgette Louise Meyer (March 14, 1919 – November 4, 1965), known as Dickey Chapelle, was an American photojournalist known for her work as a war correspondent from World War II through to her death in the Vietnam War.

== Early life ==
Chapelle was born in Milwaukee, Wisconsin, and attended Shorewood High School. By the age of sixteen, she was attending aeronautical design classes at Massachusetts Institute of Technology. She soon returned home, where she worked at a local airfield, hoping to learn to pilot airplanes instead of designing them. However, when her mother learned that she was also having an affair with one of the pilots, Chapelle was forced to live with her grandparents in Coral Gables, Florida. There, she wrote press releases for an air show, which led to an assignment in Havana, Cuba.

A story on a Cuban air show disaster that Chapelle submitted to The New York Times got her noticed by an editor at Transcontinental and Western Air (TWA), which prompted her to move to New York City. Working at the TWA publicity bureau, she began to take weekly photography classes with Tony Chapelle, who became her husband in October 1940. She eventually quit her job at TWA to compile a portfolio, which she sold to Look magazine in 1941. In April 1941, she was hired by Lear Avia to handle press liaison work for the New York office, according to a press release from the company. Later, after fifteen years of marriage, she divorced Tony, and changed her first name to Dickey. She changed her name because she looked up to polar explorer Admiral Richard Byrd. Richard's nickname was Dickey.

== Breakthrough ==
Despite limited photographic credentials Chapelle managed to become a war correspondent photojournalist during World War II for National Geographic, and with one of her first assignments, was posted with the Marines during the battle of Iwo Jima. She covered the battle of Okinawa as well. By the end of the war, she had written many war-related articles in addition to nine books, mostly about women in aviation.

Known for being unafraid, she made her first parachute jump while in her 40s.

After the war, she traveled extensively and worked in many active war zones. During the Hungarian Revolution of 1956, Chapelle was captured and jailed for over seven weeks. She later learned to jump by parachute, and when in war zones preferred to travel directly with the troops. After being told, on jumping out of a helicopter, that there was no reason to close her eyes, she adopted the motto "Only you can frighten you". Chapelle won many awards for photojournalism, and earned the respect of both the military and journalistic community. Chapelle "was a tiny woman known for her refusal to kowtow to authority and her signature uniform: fatigues, an Australian bush hat, dramatic Harlequin glasses, and pearl earrings."

== Later life ==
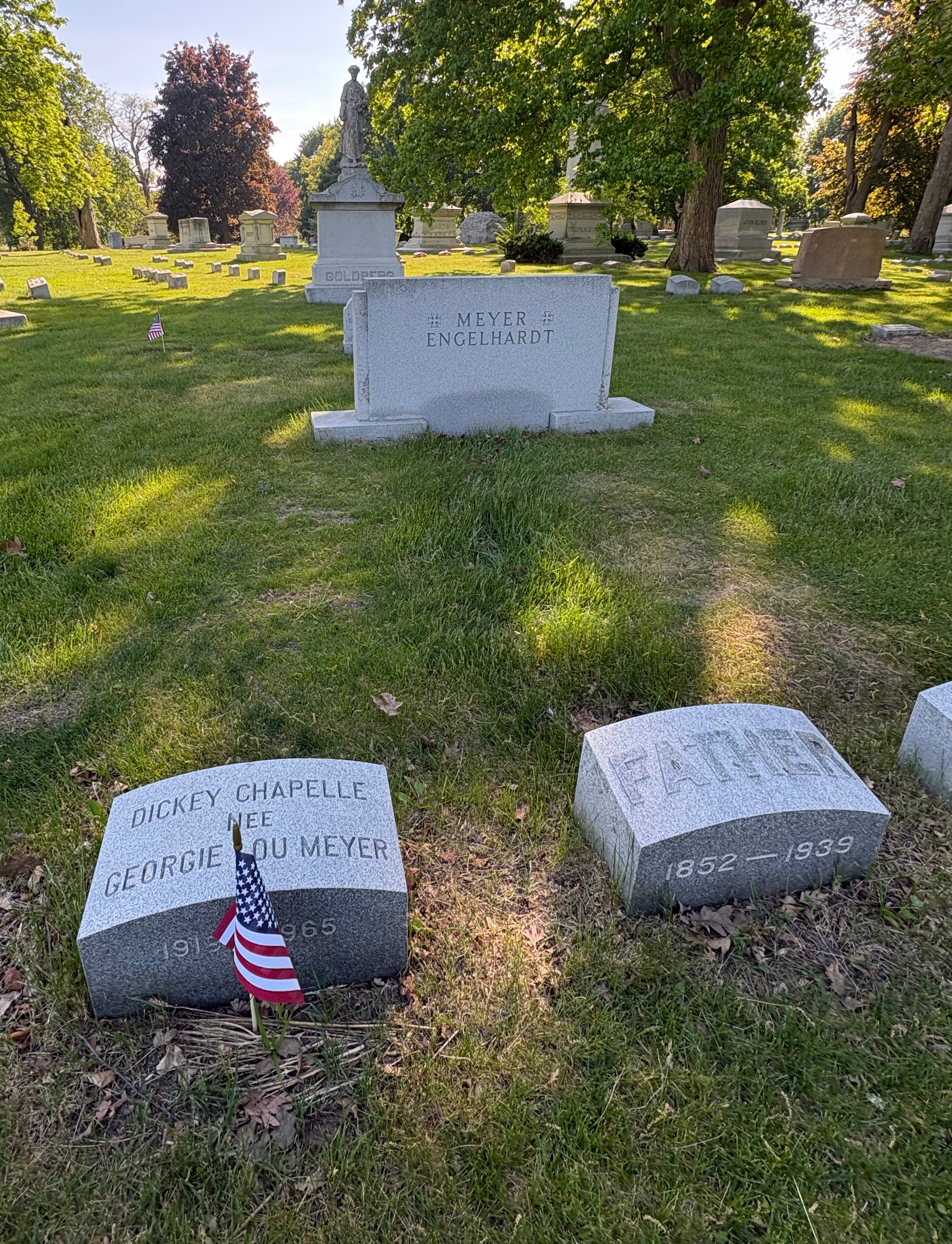
Chapelle's grave at Forest Home Cemetery

Despite early support for Fidel Castro, Chapelle was an outspoken anti-Communist, and loudly expressed these views at the beginning of the Vietnam War. Her stories in the early 1960s extolled the American military advisors who were already fighting and dying in South Vietnam, and the Sea Swallows, the anticommunist militia led by Father Nguyễn Lạc Hoá.

Chapelle was a member of the Citizens Committee for a Free Cuba, set up in 1963.

Dickey never got any special treatment because of her sex. Chapelle was killed on November 4, 1965, while on patrol with a Marine platoon during Operation Black Ferret, a search and destroy operation 16 km south of Chu Lai, Quảng Ngãi province, South Vietnam. The lieutenant in front of her kicked a tripwire boobytrap, consisting of a mortar shell with a hand grenade attached to the top of it. Chapelle was hit in the neck by a piece of shrapnel metal which severed her carotid artery and she died soon afterwards. Her last moments were captured in a photograph by Henri Huet. Her body was repatriated with an honor guard consisting of six Marines, and she was given a full Marine burial at Forest Home Cemetery in Milwaukee. There is now a monument near the site of her death. The group of Marines dedicated the memorial marker. It says "She was one of us and we will miss her."

She became the first female war correspondent to be killed in Vietnam, as well as the first American female reporter to be killed in action.

== Awards ==
- Overseas Press Club's George Polk Award for best reporting in any medium, requiring exceptional courage and enterprise abroad.
- National Press Photographers Association 1963 "Best Use of Photographs by a Newspaper" award for her photograph of a combat-ready Marine in Vietnam which appeared in the Milwaukee Journal newspaper.
- Distinguished Service Award, presented by the U.S. Marine Corps Combat Correspondents Association.
- Milwaukee Press Club inducted her into the hall of fame on the 50th anniversary of her death.

== Legacy ==
- The Marine Corps League, in conjunction with the United States Marine Corps, honors her memory by presenting the Dickey Chapelle Award annually to recognize the woman who has contributed most to the morale, welfare and well being of the men and women of the United States Marine Corps.
- In 1966, a memorial was put near the site of her death, with a plaque with the message: "She was one of us and we will miss her."
- Chapelle is one of the women featured in the documentary film No Job for a Woman: The Women Who Fought to Report WWII (2011).
- The Milwaukee Press Club inducted Chapelle into their Hall of Fame in October 2014.
- In 2015, Milwaukee PBS produced a documentary about her titled Behind the Pearl Earrings: The Story of Dickey Chapelle, Combat Photojournalist.
- The Marine Corps Combat Correspondents Association posthumously awarded her The Brigadier General Robert L. Denig Sr. Memorial Distinguished Service Award (DSA) in August 2015.
- In 2017, Chapelle was declared an honorary Marine at the Marine Corps Combat Correspondents Association's annual dinner.
- Chapelle is commemorated by the 2001 Nanci Griffith song Pearl's Eye View (The Life of Dickey Chapelle) from the album Clock Without Hands.
- In February, 1992, the first biography of Chapelle, Fire in the Wind: The Life of Dickey Chapelle, by Roberta Ostroff, was published by Ballantine Books.
- In July, 2023, another biography of Chapelle, First to the Front: The Untold Story of Dickey Chapelle, Trailblazing Female War Correspondent, by Lorissa Rinehart, was published by St. Martin's Press.

== Publications ==
=== Books ===
- Needed: Women in Government Service (as Dickey Meyer). New York: R. M. McBride (1942). OCLC 3119239.
- Girls at Work in Aviation (as Dickey Meyer). New York: Doubleday, Doran (1943). OCLC 612421869.
- How Planes Get There. Young America's Aviation Library. New York: Harper (1944). OCLC 2580901.
- What's a Woman Doing Here?: A Reporter's Report on Herself. Young America's Aviation Library. New York: William Morrow and Company (1962).

=== Contributions ===
- "How Castro Won" (1962). In: Osanka, Franklin Mark, and Samuel P. Eluntington (1962). Modern Guerrilla Warfare: Fighting Communist Guerrilla Movements, 1941-1961. New York: Free Press of Glencoe. pp. 325–335.

== See also ==
- List of journalists killed and missing in the Vietnam War
