= Marc Filloux =

French journalist

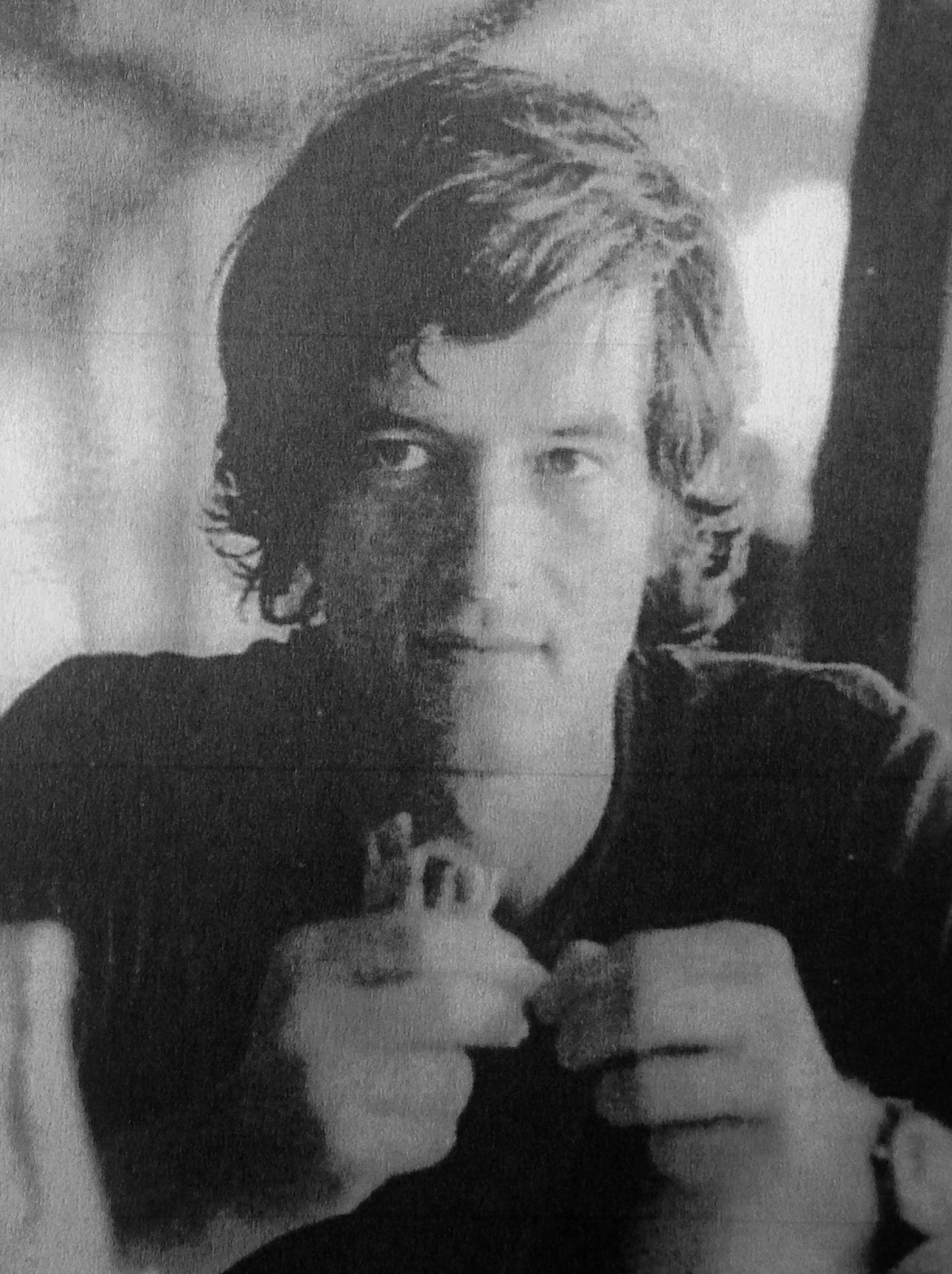
- Born: 2 November 1944; France
- Disappeared: 10 April 1974; National Highway 7, Stung Treng, Cambodia
- Died: ca. 14 April 1974 (Age 29); Houey Muang, Stung Treng, Cambodia
- Cause of death: Executed
- Employer: Agence France-Presse
- Known for: reporting during the Cambodian Civil War
- Partner: Manivanh

Marc Filloux (2 November 1944 – ca. 14 April 1974) was a French journalist based in Vientiane, Laos for Agence France-Presse who disappeared and was killed along with his translator and girlfriend in Cambodia when he attempted to be the first to obtain an interview with the Khmer Rouge's leaders during the Cambodian Civil War. Filloux was the 22nd journalist killed in Cambodia and one of 8 French journalists and one of 37 journalists overall.

== Personal ==
The names of Marc Filloux and Manivanh are on this Phnom Penh memorial to correspondents and journalists killed or missing in the 1970-1975 Cambodian war.

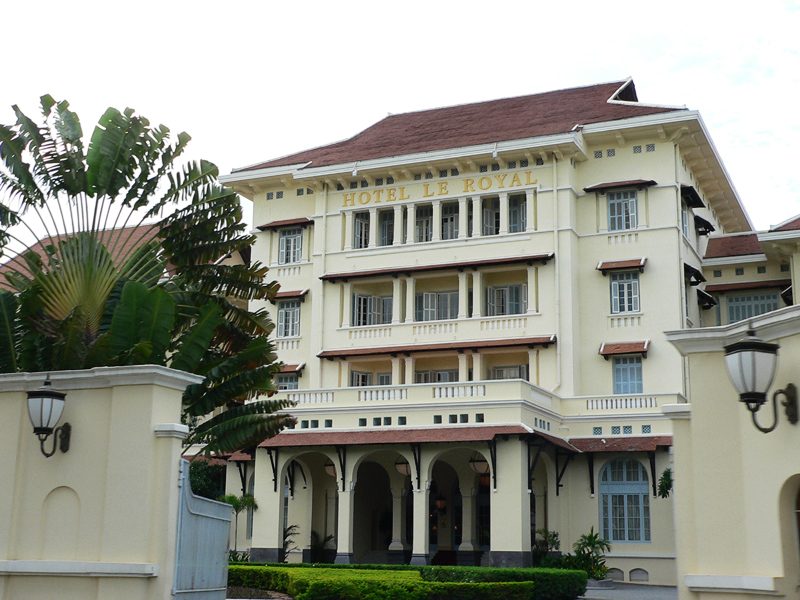
Dedicated in 2013, the journalist memorial in Phnom Penh originally stood across the street from Hotel Le Royal (above), but is now at a site near the Embassy of France.

Marc Filloux was 29 at the time of his death. While in Laos, he had a Laotian girlfriend named Manivanh who was also his translator. Filloux and Manivanh disappeared and were killed together.

== Career ==
Marc Filloux worked for the French agency, Agence France-Presse, in Vientiane, Laos. Filloux was hired in Southeast Asia to the AFP's main office in Paris, France, but went to Cambodia and was killed before he could assume his new post.

== Death ==
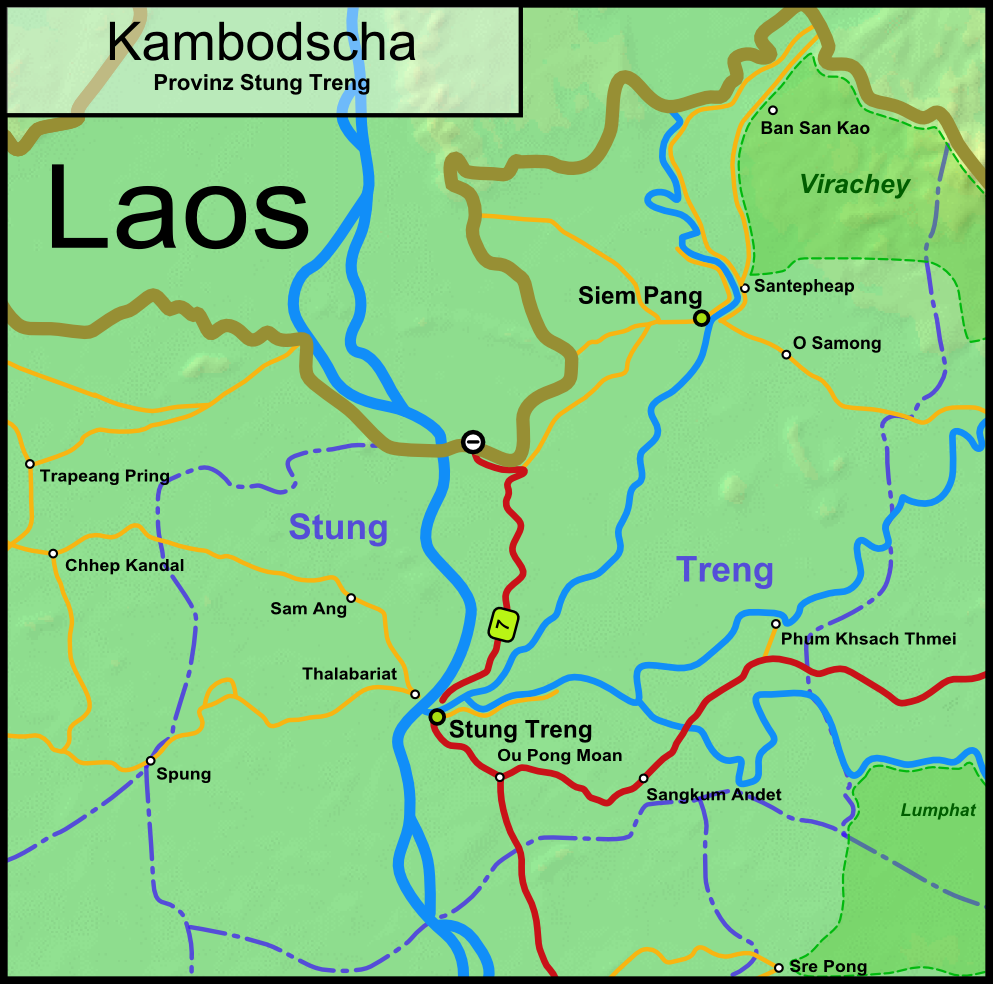
Stung Treng sits on the Mekong River and was where Filloux and Manivanh were last seen.

Filloux crossed over from Laos into Cambodia through Route 13 (Laos), as did other journalists at the time. Filloux and his Laotian girlfriend and translator Manivanh were last seen in Stung Treng, Cambodia on National Highway 7 (Cambodia), an important road that connected Vientiane with Cambodia. They were killed by the Khmer Rouge, even though Filloux had gone to them to request an interview with the movement's leaders. Tiziano Terzani, who knew Filloux and also reported on the same conflict, said it was a possibility that Filloux could have been killed as an accused spy but Terzani could never confirm the rumor. According to the Sydney Morning Herald, the story had some credibility because a flyer in the area was issued with the news that two spies were killed. Their disappearance and death occurred during military struggle between the US-backed Lon Nol government and the Khmer Rouge guerrillas.

== Context ==
Whereas journalists in Vietnam relied on the U.S. military for passage and access, journalists who were covering the Cambodian Civil War were acting independently and without support. The forces operating inside Cambodia at the time were Vietnamese communists, Khmer Rouge, and Cambodian and US military, and the shifting lines of battle added to the uncertainty. Those journalists who ended up in Khmer Rouge territory and were caught by them were known by the journalists at the time to not come back alive. Filloux and Manivanh were killed eight months before the attack on Phnom Penh beginning New Year's Day 1975.

== Impact ==
In 1974, Marc Filloux attempted to obtain the first interview with the Khmer Rouge leadership at a time when there were signs of their atrocities but they were largely unknown and their atrocities were also largely unknown. Japanese journalists Koki Ishiyama working for Kyodo News and freelance photojournalist Taicho Ichinose had already been killed by the Khmer Rouge at the time Filloux attempted the contact. The atrocities of the Khmer Rouge became publicly known by 1979. Pol Pot granted his first interview with journalists to a pair of Yugoslavians in 1978 and his last interview in 1998 to journalist Nate Thayer.

== Reactions ==
The names of the journalists who died reporting the Cambodian war are engraved on a memorial that in February 2013 was unveiled in a public park in front of Phnom Penh's Hotel Le Royal, which was a meeting place for foreign correspondents in the 1970s. In 2017, the memorial was moved to a site near the French embassy.

He was added to the list in The Freedom Forum Journalists Memorial at the Newseum in Washington, D.C., in 2010, which was 36 years after his death.

Tiziano Terzani dedicated the book "In Asien" (German) to the memory of Marc Filloux.

== Writings ==
Marc Filloux, "Les révolutionnaires et les neutralistes laotiens tiennent l’extrême droite en échec," Le Monde Diplomatique (April 1974).

== See also ==
- Indochina Media Memorial Foundation
- Cambodian Civil War

== Readings ==
- Kurt Volkert and T. Jeff Williams A Cambodian Odyssey: and The Deaths of 25 Journalists iUniverse, 2001. (ISBN 0595166067)
- Requiem: By the Photographers Who Died in Vietnam and Indochina editing by Tim Page and Horst Faas, Random House; 1st edition, 1997.
