= Media Foundation (disambiguation) =

Media Foundation is a COM-based multimedia framework pipeline and infrastructure platform for digital media in Windows Vista.

Media Foundation may also refer to:

- Media Foundation for West Africa, an international NGO based in Accra
- Adbusters Media Foundation, an anti-consumerist organization
- Educational Media Foundation, a radio broadcasting company
- International Women's Media Foundation, a journalism organization

== See also ==
- Indochina Media Memorial Foundation
- Media Preservation Foundation
