= Nguyễn Lạc Hoá =

Vietnamese Catholic priest (1901–1993)

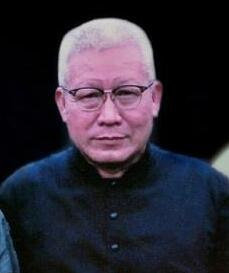

Augustinus Nguyễn Lạc Hóa (Chinese: 阮樂化; pinyin: Ruǎn Lèhuà; c. 1901–c. 1993) was a refugee Chinese Catholic priest, who arrived in South Vietnam in 1959 and led a militia called the Sea Swallows resisting the Viet Cong in the Ca Mau Peninsula. The "fighting priest" and his "village that refused to die" attracted admiring media stories in the United States, and in 1964 he received the Ramon Magsaysay Award in the Public Service category.

== Biography ==
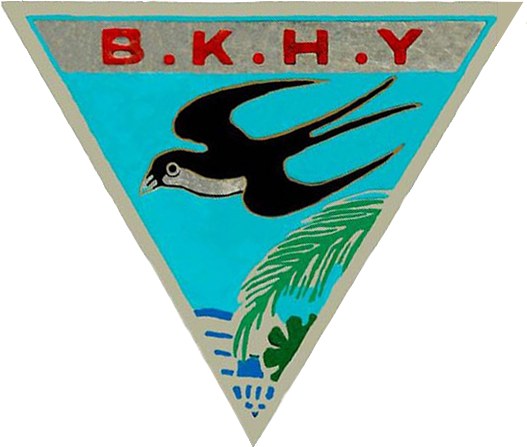
Insignia of Biệt khu Hải Yến

Nguyễn Lạc Hoá was born on 28 August 1908 in Móng Cái, Hải Ninh in a Chinese Nùng family.

Hoá fled from Guangxi Province in Communist China in 1950–51 with over 2,000 parishioners and ex-KMT soldiers, and spent eight years in Cambodia. In 1959, Hoá with 450 of the refugees were expelled by Norodom Sihanouk, then settled in Binh Hung on the Ca Mau Peninsula. They created a village and Hoá established a militia force – the Sea Swallows (Vietnamese: Biệt khu Hải Yến) – against the Viet Cong, who were active in the area.

Hoá's success inspired others to join his Sea Swallows, including a company of "Nung tribesmen." Declassified documents would reveal that the Nung fighters were actually a contingent of Nationalist soldiers from the Republic of China.

As the political situation in Saigon deteriorated, Hoá saw the battle turning and little chance of winning. Discouraged, he left Binh Hung, and retired to a parish in Taipei in 1973.

== Recognition in U.S. ==
In January 1961, Edward Lansdale visited Hoá and Binh Hung. Back in Washington, he was surprised to find that President John F. Kennedy had taken a personal interest in his report on Hoá, and wanted it published in the Saturday Evening Post. It was attributed to "an American officer." The town of Newburyport, Massachusetts adopted Binh Hung as a sister community, and the Post followed up with another story on Hoá. Other correspondents who took up the story of the Sea Swallows included Dickey Chapelle and Stan Atkinson, who remembered Hoá decades later as the "most unforgettable character" he met in his travels.
