= List of journalists killed and missing in the Vietnam War =

This article is a partial list of journalists killed and missing during the Vietnam War. The press freedom organization Reporters Without Borders tallied 63 journalists who died over a 20-year period ending in 1975 while covering the Vietnam War with the caveat that media workers were not typically counted at the time.

== List ==
Year and date killed/missing	Surname, First name(s)	Nationality	Agency	Operation/Battle Name	Location	Circumstances of loss	Burial
1954, May 25	Capa, Robert	American	Freelance, Magnum Freelance, Magnum		Vietnam, Thái Bình Province	Killed after stepping on land mine, while accompanying French Troops.	
1955, April 29	Reese, Everette Dixie	American	US Economic Cooperation Administration Office of the Special Representative		Vietnam, Saigon	Killed while documenting the First Battle of Saigon on board a plane which was shot down	
1965	Tran, Pham	North Vietnamese	Nhân Dân		Vietnam	Killed when his unit engaged US and ARVN forces	
1965, May 27	Van Thiel, Pieter	American	Freelancer		Vietnam, Mekong Delta	Captured by the Viet Cong during an ARVN attack, he was tortured then executed	
1965, September 16	Rose, Jerry	American	Freelancer		Vietnam	Killed when the plane he was travelling in crashed	
1965, October 2	Kolenberg, Bernard	American	Associated Press		Vietnam	Killed when the A-1 he was travelling in collided with another A-1 and crashed	
1965, October 10	Huynh, Thanh My	South Vietnamese	Associated Press		Vietnam, Cần Thơ	Wounded while photographing an engagement between the Viet Cong and Vietnamese Rangers, he was awaiting evacuation when the Viet Cong overran the landing zone and killed all the wounded	
1965, November 4	Chapelle, Dickey	American		Operation Black Ferret	Vietnam, Quảng Ngãi Province	Killed while on patrol with a United States Marine Corps unit when a landmine fragment severed her carotid artery.	
1966, February 10	Kermit H. Yoho	American	Department of the Army Special Photographic Office		Vietnam, Củ Chi district	Killed in a Vietcong ambush while on patrol with Company C, 1st Battalion, 27th Infantry Regiment	
1966, February 14	Chellapah, Charles	Singaporean	Associated Press		Vietnam, Củ Chi district	Killed by a claymore mine while on patrol with US forces.	
1966, May 21	Castan, Sam	American	Look magazine		Vietnam, Landing Zone Hereford	Killed by mortar fire with a unit of the 1st Cavalry Division.	
1967, February 21	Fall, Bernard	American		Operation Chinook II	Vietnam, Street Without Joy	Killed when he stepped on a Bouncing Betty mine while on patrol with the 1st Battalion 9th Marines.	
1967, February 21	Highland, Byron	American	Headquarters Company, 3rd Marine Division	Operation Chinook II	Vietnam, Street Without Joy	Killed by a Bouncing Betty mine while on patrol with the 1st Battalion 9th Marines.	
1967, March 11	Gallagher, Ronald	American	Freelancer		Vietnam,	Killed by friendly artillery fire	
1967, May 9	Schuyler, Philippa	American	Manchester Union Leader		Vietnam, Da Nang	Killed when the UH-1 helicopter she was travelling in crashed in the sea near Da Nang	
1968, March 4	Ellison, Robert	American	Newsweek	Battle of Khe Sanh	Vietnam, Khe Sanh	One of 44 passengers and crew killed when the C-123 #54-0590 he was travelling in was shot down by People's Army of Vietnam (PAVN) anti-aircraft fire.	
1968, March 5	Mine, Hiromishi	Japanese	UPI		Vietnam	Killed when the armored personnel carrier he was travelling in hit a land mine	
1968, May 5	Michael Birch	New Zealander	Australian Associated Press	May Offensive	Vietnam, Cholon	Killed when the Mini Moke he was travelling in was ambushed by Viet Cong forces.	
1968, May 5	Cantwell, John Leonard	Australian	Time magazine	May Offensive	Vietnam, Cholon	Killed when the Mini Moke he was travelling in was ambushed by Viet Cong forces.	
1968, May 5	Laramy, Ronald	British	Reuters	May Offensive	Vietnam, Cholon	Killed when the Mini Moke he was travelling in was ambushed by Viet Cong forces.	
1968, May 5	Piggott, Bruce	Australian	Reuters	May Offensive	Vietnam, Cholon	Killed when the Mini Moke he was travelling in was ambushed by Viet Cong forces.	
1968, May 6	Eggleston, Charles	American	UPI	May Offensive	Vietnam, Tan Son Nhut	Killed by Viet Cong fire.	
1968, May 8	Ezcurra, Ignacio	Argentinian	La Nación	May Offensive	Vietnam, Saigon	Killed by Viet Cong fire	
1968, August 22	Sakai, Tatsuo	Japanese	Nihon Keizai Shimbun		Vietnam, Saigon	Killed when his apartment was hit in a Viet Cong rocket attack	
1969	Saint-Paul, Alain	French	Agence France-Presse		Vietnam, Duc Lap	Killed during a PAVN rocket attack	
1969, April 18	Savanuck, Paul	American	Stars and Stripes		Vietnam	Killed during an engagement between PAVN forces and an American armored unit	
1969, August 16	Noonan, Oliver	American	Associated Press		Vietnam, Quảng Nam Province	Killed when the UH-1H #66-16303 he was travelling in was hit by enemy fire and crashed killing all on board	
1970, April 5	Caron, Gilles	French	Gamma	Cambodian Campaign	Cambodia, Svay Rieng Province	Captured by the PAVN while driving down Highway One.	Missing.
1970, April 6	Arpin, Claude	French	Newsweek	Cambodian Campaign	Cambodia, Svay Rieng Province	Captured by the PAVN while driving down Highway One.	Missing.
1970, April 6	Hannoteaux, Guy	French	L'Express	Cambodian Campaign	Cambodia, Svay Rieng Province	Captured by the PAVN while driving down Highway One.	Missing.
1970, April 6	Kusaka, Akira	Japanese	Fuji Television	Cambodian Campaign	Cambodia, Svay Rieng Province	Captured by the PAVN while driving down Highway One.	Missing.
1970, April 6	Takagi, Yujiro	Japanese	Fuji Television	Cambodian Campaign	Cambodia, Svay Rieng Province	Captured by the PAVN while driving down Highway One.	Missing.
1970, April 6	Flynn, Sean	American	Time magazine	Cambodian Campaign	Cambodia, Svay Rieng Province	Captured while motorcycling down Highway One, believed to have been executed by the Khmer Rouge in 1971	Missing.
1970, April 6	Stone, Dana	American	CBS News	Cambodian Campaign	Cambodia, Svay Rieng Province	Captured while motorcycling down Highway One, believed to have been executed by the Khmer Rouge in 1971	Missing.
1970, April 8	Bellendorf, Dieter	German	NBC	Cambodian Campaign	Cambodia, Svay Rieng Province	Captured by the PAVN while driving down Highway One.	Missing.
1970, April 8	Gensluckner, George	Austrian	Freelance	Cambodian Campaign	Cambodia, Svay Rieng Province	Captured by the PAVN while driving down Highway One.	Missing.
1970, April 16	Mettler, Willy	Swiss	Freelance	Cambodian Campaign	Cambodia, Kampot Province	Captured by the PAVN.	Missing.
1970, May 9	Childs, Christopher	American	221st Signal Company (Pictorial)	Cambodian Campaign	near Pleiku	Passenger on 189th Assault Helicopter Company UH-1D helicopter shot down by PAVN anti-aircraft fire	
1970, May 9	Itri, Douglas	American	221st Signal Company (Pictorial)	Cambodian Campaign	near Pleiku	Passenger on 189th Assault Helicopter Company UH-1D helicopter shot down by PAVN anti-aircraft fire	
1970, May 9	Lowe, Ronald	American	221st Signal Company (Pictorial)	Cambodian Campaign	near Pleiku	Passenger on 189th Assault Helicopter Company UH-1D helicopter shot down by PAVN anti-aircraft fire	
1970, May 9	Paradis, Raymond	American	221st Signal Company (Pictorial)	Cambodian Campaign	near Pleiku	Passenger on 189th Assault Helicopter Company UH-1D helicopter shot down by PAVN anti-aircraft fire	
1970, May 9	Young, Larry	American	221st Signal Company (Pictorial)	Cambodian Campaign	near Pleiku	Passenger on 189th Assault Helicopter Company UH-1D helicopter shot down by PAVN anti-aircraft fire	
1970, May 10	Yanagisawa, Takeshi	Japanese	Nippon Denpa	Cambodian Campaign	Cambodia, Kampot Province	Captured by the PAVN.	Missing.
1970, May 29	Nakajima, Teruo	Japanese	Omori Research	Cambodian Campaign	Cambodia	Captured by the PAVN.	Missing.
1970, May 31	Colne, Roger	French	NBC	Cambodian Campaign	Cambodia, Takéo Province	Captured by the PAVN and believed to have been executed the following day.	Body was found in 1992.
1970, May 31	Hangen, Welles	American	NBC	Cambodian Campaign	Cambodia, Takéo Province	Captured by the PAVN and believed to have been executed the following day.	Body was found in 1992, and buried at Arlington on January 29, 1993.
1970, May 31	Waku, Yoshihiko	Japanese	NBC	Cambodian Campaign	Cambodia, Takéo Province	Captured by the PAVN and believed to have been executed the following day.	Body was found in 1992.
1970, May 31	Ishii, Tomoharo	Japanese	CBS	Cambodian Campaign	Cambodia, Takéo Province	Captured by the PAVN and believed to have been executed the following day.	Missing.
1970, May 31	Lekhi, Ramnik	Indian	CBS	Cambodian Campaign	Cambodia, Takéo Province	Believed to have been killed by a PAVN RPG	Body was recovered on June 12, 1970.
1970, May 31	Miller, Gerald	American	CBS	Cambodian Campaign	Cambodia, Takéo Province	Believed to have been killed by a PAVN RPG	Body was recovered on June 12, 1970.
1970, May 31	Sakai, Kojiro	Japanese	CBS	Cambodian Campaign	Cambodia, Takéo Province	Captured by the PAVN and believed to have been executed the following day.	Body was found in 1992.
1970, May 31	Syvertsen, George	American	CBS	Cambodian Campaign	Cambodia, Takéo Province	Believed to have been killed by a PAVN RPG	Body was recovered on June 3, 1970.
1970, July 7	Puissesseau, René	French	ORTF		Cambodia, Siem Reap Province	Killed by the PAVN	Killed
1970, July 7	Meyer, Raymond	French	ORTF		Cambodia, Siem Reap Province	Killed by the PAVN	Missing.
1970, September 18	Duynisveld, Johannes	Dutch	Freelance		Cambodia	Captured by the Khmer Rouge.	Missing.
1970, October 28	Frosch, Frank	American	UPI		Cambodia, Takéo Province	Killed by the Khmer Rouge/PAVN	Killed
1970, October 28	Sawada, Kyoichi	Japanese	UPI		Cambodia, Takéo Province	Killed by the Khmer Rouge/PAVN	Killed
1971, February 10	Burrows, Larry	British	Life magazine	Operation Lam Son 719	Laos, Xépôn	Passenger on ARVN UH-1H helicopter shot down by PAVN anti-aircraft fire over the Ho Chi Minh Trail	Remains identified in 2002 and interred at the Newseum on 3 April 2008.
1971, February 10	Huet, Henri	French/Vietnamese	Associated Press	Operation Lam Son 719	Laos, Xépôn	Passenger on ARVN UH-1H helicopter shot down by PAVN anti-aircraft fire over the Ho Chi Minh Trail	Remains identified in 2002 and interred at the Newseum on 3 April 2008.
1971, February 10	Potter, Kent	American	UPI	Operation Lam Son 719	Laos, Xépôn	Passenger on ARVN UH-1H helicopter shot down by PAVN anti-aircraft fire over the Ho Chi Minh Trail	Remains identified in 2002 and interred at the Newseum on 3 April 2008.
1971, February 10	Shimamoto, Keizaburo	Japanese	Newsweek	Operation Lam Son 719	Laos, Xépôn	Passenger on ARVN UH-1H helicopter shot down by PAVN anti-aircraft fire over the Ho Chi Minh Trail	Remains identified in 2002 and interred at the Newseum on 3 April 2008.
1971, February	Sully, François	French	Newsweek	Operation Lam Son 719	Laos, Xépôn	Passenger on ARVN UH-1H command helicopter of General Đỗ Cao Trí shot down by PAVN anti-aircraft fire, he leapt from the burning wreckage but later died of injuries sustained in the fall	Buried at Mạc Đĩnh Chi Cemetery
1972, July 12	Shimkin, Alexander	American	Newsweek	Second Battle of Quảng Trị	Vietnam, Quảng Trị	Killed by a grenade during an ambush by PAVN forces	Body not recovered
1972, July 21	Kai Faye, Sam	Singaporean	ABC	Second Battle of Quảng Trị	Vietnam, Quảng Trị	Killed by PAVN forces when he strayed into the frontline area	
1972, July 21	Khoo, Terry	Singaporean	ABC	Second Battle of Quảng Trị	Vietnam, Quảng Trị	Killed by PAVN forces when he strayed into the frontline area	
1972, July 22	Hebert, Gerard		UPI	Second Battle of Quảng Trị	Vietnam, Quảng Trị	Killed by a stray artillery round	
1972, July	Gill, James	British	The Daily Telegraph	Easter Offensive	Vietnam, near Da Nang	Captured and executed by PAVN forces	
1973, March 19	Wakabayashi, Hiroo	Japanese	Freelancer		Vietnam, Buôn Ma Thuột		
1973, November 29	Ichinose, Taizo	Japanese	Freelancer		Cambodia, Angkor	Killed by Khmer Rouge while trying to photograph the Angkor temples	
1973, December 10	Trinh, Dinh, Hy	North Vietnamese	Vietnam News Agency		Vietnam, Da Nang		
1974	Nguyen, Man Hieu	South Vietnamese	Freelancer		Vietnam		
1974	Vu, Van Giang	South Vietnamese	Freelancer		Vietnam, Quảng Ngãi Province	Killed while photographing an ARVN attack	
1974	Vu, Hung Dung	North Vietnamese	Liberation News Agency		Vietnam, Cần Thơ	Killed when his unit was ambushed	
1974	Ishiyama, Koki	Japanese	Kyodo News		Cambodia, Oudong	Captured by Khmer Rouge on 10 October 1973. Died of disease/malnutrition	
1974, circa April 14	Filloux, Marc	French	Agence France-Presse	Cambodian War	Cambodia, Stung Treng Province	Captured after crossing border from Laos in attempt to interview Khmer Rouge, executed by Khmer Rouge	Missing
1974, circa April 14	Manivanh	Laotian	Agence France-Presse	Cambodian War	Cambodia, Stung Treng Province	Captured after crossing border from Laos in attempt to interview Khmer Rouge, executed by Khmer Rouge	Missing
1974, December 11	Do, Van Vu	South Vietnamese	Associated Press		Vietnam, Chuong Thien Province	Killed while covering combat in the Mekong Delta	
1975, March 13	Leandri, Paul	French	Agence France-Presse	Fall of Saigon	Vietnam, Saigon	Killed by Saigon police	
1975, April 17	Vichith, Sou	Cambodian	Gamma		Cambodia, Phnom Penh	Died in the Killing Fields	
1975, April 28	Laurent, Michel	French	Gamma	Fall of Saigon	Vietnam, Saigon	Killed while trying to rescue another correspondent	

== See also ==
- List of United States servicemembers and civilians missing in action during the Vietnam War (1961–65)
- List of United States servicemembers and civilians missing in action during the Vietnam War (1966–67)
- List of United States servicemembers and civilians missing in action during the Vietnam War (1968–69)
- List of United States servicemembers and civilians missing in action during the Vietnam War (1970–71)
- List of United States servicemembers and civilians missing in action during the Vietnam War (1972–75)
- Vietnam War POW/MIA issue
- Joint POW/MIA Accounting Command
- Defense Prisoner of War/Missing Personnel Office
