= Indochina Media Memorial Foundation =

UK-based foundation

The Indochina Media Memorial Foundation (IMMF) was founded in 1991 by British photographer Tim Page, who survived multiple wounds while covering the Vietnam War. The foundation was set up to honor the memory of the more than 320 journalists from all sides who died while covering the conflicts in Vietnam, Laos and Cambodia from 1945 to 1975. Its other main aim was to assist colleagues in a region that was emerging from decades of war, poverty and isolation-remembering the dead by helping the living.

Two legal entities were established, one based in Bangkok, Thailand, the other in the United Kingdom. Each operated entirely independently with separate, self-generated funding. IMMF-Thailand got seed funding when members of the Foreign Correspondents' Club of Thailand passed round a hat one evening after a program with Tim Page in 1991. Over US$40,000 was raised in 1992 at a sellout auction in Bangkok of over a hundred photographs from Indochina - old and new, at war and at peace. All the photographs were donated by the photographers themselves or their estates. Photographs sold from the Vietnam War era included work by James Caccavo, Greg Davis, Hubert Van Es, John Everingham, Horst Faas, Sean Flynn, Henri Huet, Luong Nghia Dung, Francoise de Mulder, Roland Neveau, Nguyen Van Bao, Tim Page, Dana Stone, Tiziano Terzani and Lance Woodruff. A similar auction a few years later, also in Bangkok, raised more funds.

IMMF-Thailand provided training for nearly 900 journalists from Vietnam, Laos, Cambodia, Thailand and Myanmar, conducting 23 regional training courses in Thailand and 25 workshops in the five countries from 1994 to 2009. It pioneered the concept of bringing journalists from the region together on courses as well as training media inside military-ruled Myanmar prior to 2010 and in remote areas of Laos. A number of IMMF-Thailand alumni have been promoted to senior positions in radio broadcast, television, photography and the print media. Outstanding alumni were assisted in obtaining scholarships and entry into media studies in Europe and the United States. IMMF-Thailand also commissioned, edited and published journalism training manuals in English and five of the vernaculars of mainland Southeast Asia. These continue to be widely used.

In 1995, IMMF-Thailand provided a grant to the Photo Archive Group in Cambodia to preserve archival photos of the Tuol Sleng Museum of Genocide in Phnom Penh. It commissioned reports on the state of historic films held in Vietnamese and Lao film archives. IMMF-Thailand also sponsored reports on the state of journalism and the media in the five countries it served and shared this information with other development organizations. IMMF-Thailand's courses focused on basic skills and sound journalistic practices and normally revolved around specific themes including the environment, agriculture, ethnic minorities, social issues and business-economics. Experts were invited as lecturers but IMMF-Thailand's emphasis was on an "outdoor classroom," with students spending segments of every course in the field. Trainers were all former or practicing journalists, and highly regarded in their fields. Many came through Britain's Thomson Foundation.

IMMF-Thailand's regional courses, conducted in English, averaged 16 students and lasted four weeks. The shorter in-country workshops, mainly in Laos and Myanmar, were taught through interpreters. Several exhibitions of photographs from the courses were staged and a number of articles by IMMF-Thailand alumni were published in Bangkok newspapers.

The organization was supported by major private organizations, government agencies and individual donors in 13 Asian, European and North American countries.

Co-presidents Dominic Faulder, a British correspondent, editor and writer, and Denis D. Gray, an Associated Press correspondent who covered the Vietnam War, headed IMMF-Thailand from 1994 to 2009 after founding president Charles Antoine de Nerciat of the news agency Agence France- Presse returned to France. Project Director Sarah McLean, a former official with the British Foreign Office, organized courses, obtained funding and handled administration.

IMMF-Thailand ceased active training on March 31, 2009, and dissolved its board and administrative staff, transferring its remaining funds to the Foreign Correspondents' Club of Thailand which continues to update IMMF training manuals, oversee its web site and conduct other legacy activities.

IMMF-United Kingdom has organized four workshops for photojournalists, all of them held in Vietnam. The first was held in Ho Chi Minh City in 2002 with more than 40 participants. The second was organized in Hanoi in 2005 with over 50 attendees. Others were conducted in 2007 and 2010. In 1997, two of its members, Tim Page and Pulitzer Prize-winning photographer Horst Faas, published Requiem, a collection of images by the photographers who died in Vietnam and Indochina.

== See also ==
List of journalists killed and missing in the Vietnam War
