= Month of Photography Asia =

Photography festival

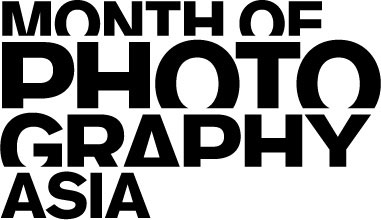
- Genre: Photography
- Inaugurated: 2002
- Most recent: 2011
- Leader: Shirlene Noordin
- Website: www.mopasia.com.sg

Month of Photography Asia (also known as MOPA and MOPAsia) was an international festival of photography in Singapore from 2002 to 2011.

The festival promoted photography both as an art form and as a creative industry. Each year, Month of Photography Asia was curated along a specific theme and presented works by international and Singaporean photographers in relation to this.

The festival's main line-up of exhibitions was complemented by both public programmes, which included round tables, master classes, talks, portfolio reviews, screenings, tours and workshops.

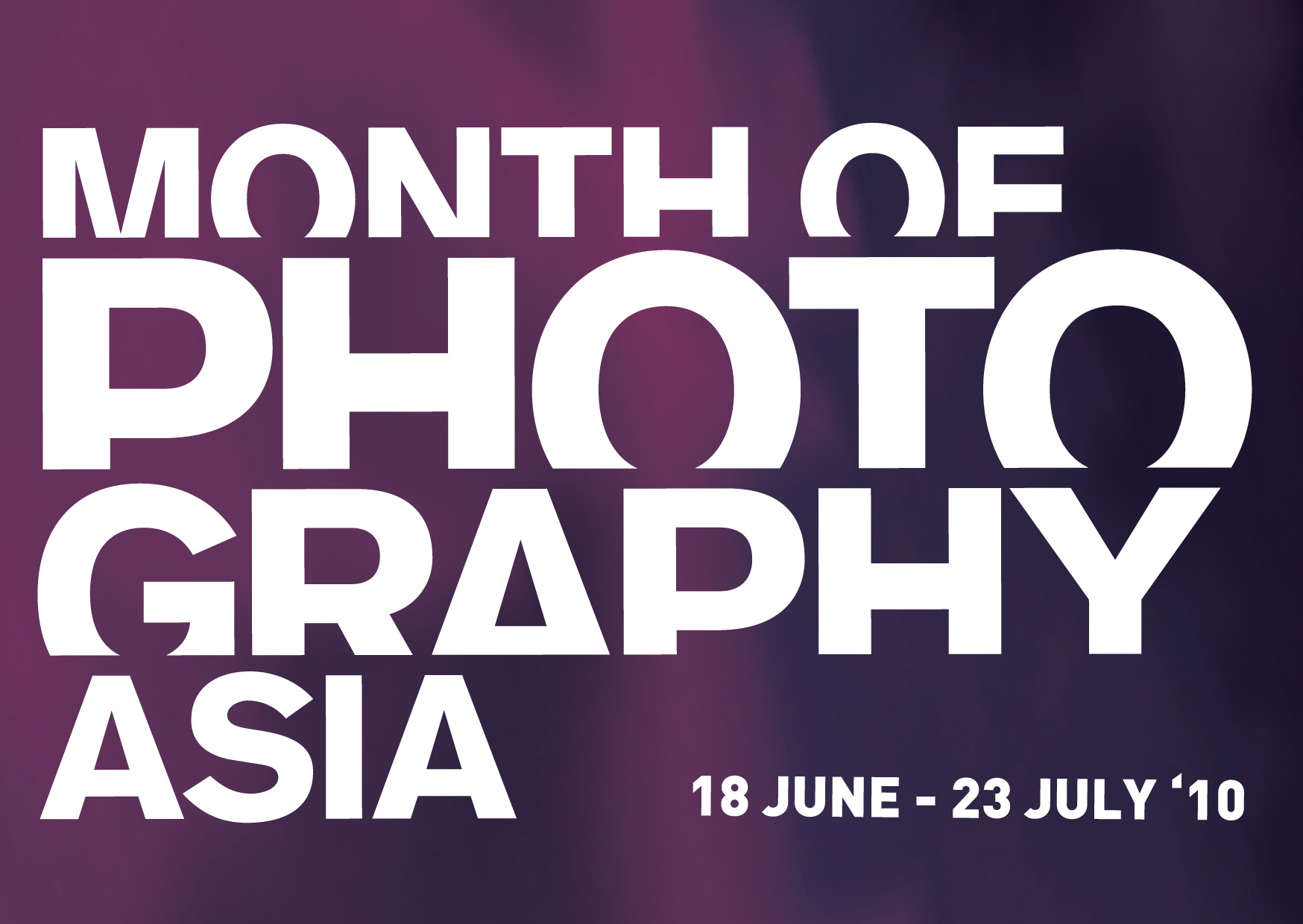
Logo of MOPAsia 2010

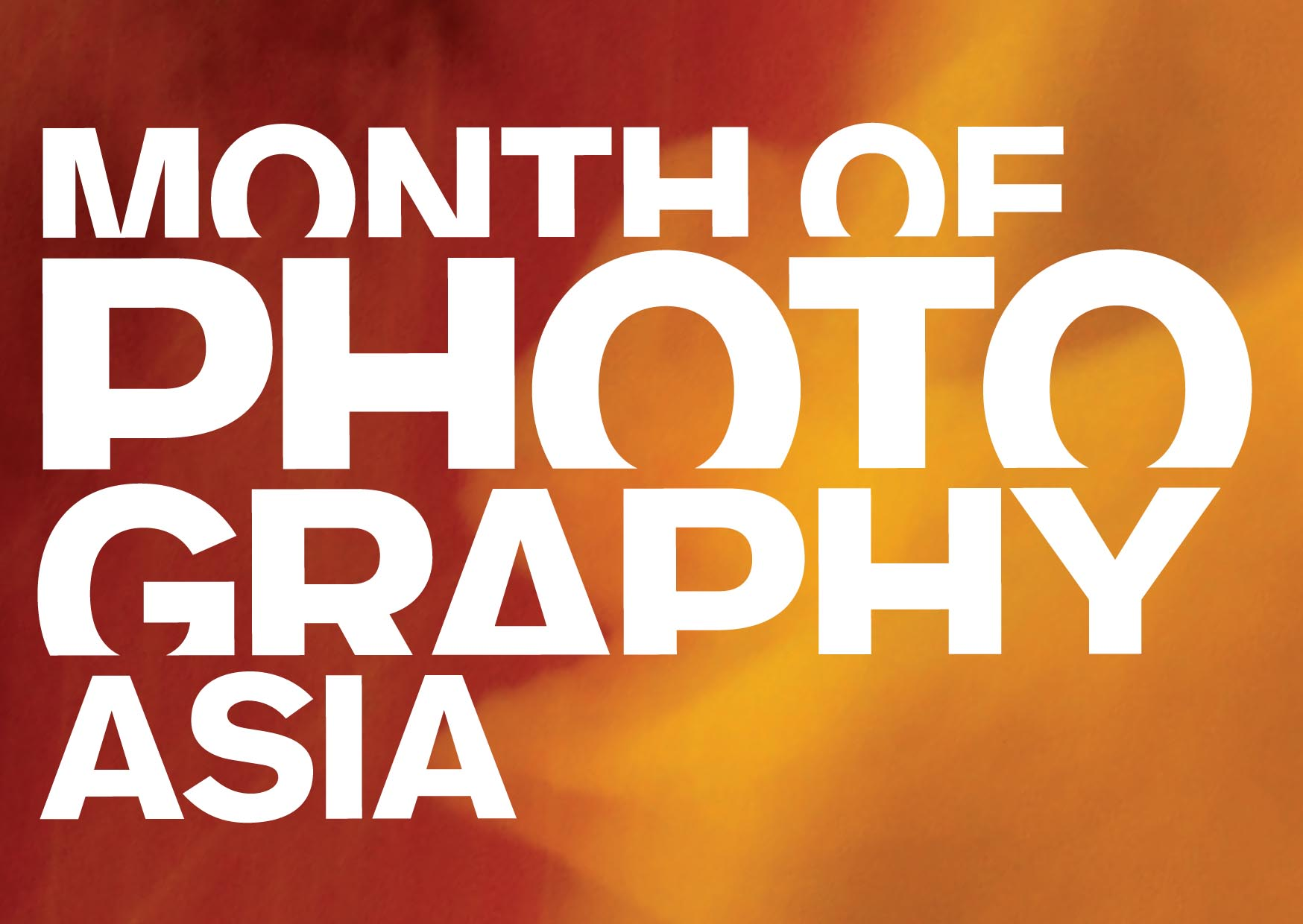
Logo of MOPAsia 2009

The festival was first established in 2002 as the Month of Photography in Singapore, on a joint initiative by the Alliance Française de Singapour and the National Arts Council. It was inaugurated in the presence of Jean-Luc Monterosso, director of the European House of Photography, MEP). Phish Communications managed the 2003, 2004 and 2006 editions of the festival. In 2007, the festival took the name of Month of Photography Asia (MOPA or MOPAsia).

== Curatorial themes ==
From 2004 onwards, a curatorial theme provided the backbone of each edition of the festival:

- 2004: Popular Pleasures through Photography
- 2006: Le Regard Documentaire
- 2007: Wanderings
- 2008: Still/Moving: Photography & Cinema
- 2009: Engaging Asia
- 2010: Praxis
- 2011: Memory

== Out of Focus ==
In 2006, the festival started a series of group shows titled Out of Focus dedicated to emerging Singaporean or Singapore-based photographers who had not yet had a solo show. The first of these was curated by Tay Kay Chin. Objectifs: Centre for Photography and Filmmaking curated in 2007 to 2009.

== Residency programme ==
In 2008, the festival initiated an artist residency programme in partnership with Lasalle College of the Arts, with the support of the French embassy. Alain Fleischer was the first photographer in residence in 2008, followed by Françoise Huguier in 2009.

== InsideOut ==
In 2009, the festival added InsideOut, a project that aimed to allow the audience to see Singapore through the eyes of migrant workers to foster mutual understanding. First launched in 2006 together with the M1 Singapore Fringe Festival, the project was revived in the 2009 edition of MOPAsia as InsideOut II and continued in 2010 as InsideOut III.

== ICON de Martell Cordon Bleu photography award ==
In 2010, the festival included the newly created ICON de Martell Cordon Bleu photography award. Established by Martell Cordon Bleu together with the Month of Photography Asia, this juried prize was aimed at recognizing the most outstanding photographer in Singapore who had shown originality of vision, presented thought-provoking ideas, explored new concepts and demonstrated a commitment to his/her photography.

In 2010 the jury included Martin Parr and Agnès de Gouvion Saint-Cyr. Sherman Ong was the winner, awarded a cash prize of $30,000 and publication of a book of their work.

In 2011 the winner was Sean Lee.

== Directors ==
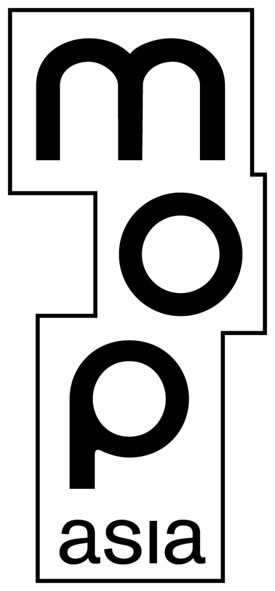
Logo of MOPAsia 2007 & 2008

- Shirlene Noordin, director from 2006 to 2010
- Shirlene Noordin and Raphaël Millet, co-directors in 2011

== Notable photographers having solo exhibitions, talks, master classes and residencies ==
- 2002: Marc Riboud, Laure Bonduelle, Lucas Jodogne, Gilles Massot, Keiichi Tahara, Jean-Christophe Ballot, Horst Wackerbarth, and Marie-Laure de Decker
- 2004: Pierre et Gilles
- 2006: Henri Cartier-Bresson and Robert Doisneau
- 2007: Martin Parr and Raymond Depardon
- 2008: Alain Fleischer, Abbas, Sherman Ong, Sean Lee, and Marcel Thomas
- 2009: Deanna Ng, Françoise Huguier, Steve McCurry, Marc Riboud, Bertrand Meunier, and Agnès de Gouvion Saint-Cyr
- 2010: Sherman Ong, Jing Quek, Francis Ng, Tay Wei Ling, Mattias Klum, Marcel Heijnen, Martin Parr, and Agnès de Gouvion Saint-Cyr
- 2011: Agan Harahap and Tim Page

== Partners ==
The festival collaborated closely with the European House of Photography (Maison Européenne de la Photographie) in its first year, and subsequently developed partnerships with photo agencies Magnum Photos and Rapho, as well as with the Henri Cartier-Bresson Foundation and the National Foundation for Contemporary Art (Fonds national d'art contemporain (FNAC)) in Paris, and the George Eastman House in Rochester, New York.

It worked locally with the National Arts Council (Singapore) (NAC), the Singapore Arts Festival, the Lasalle College of the Arts, Objectifs: Centre for Photography and Filmmaking, Migrant Voices, as well as the Cathay Organisation (with its Cathay Gallery).

It partnered with high commissions and embassies, the United States of America Embassy, the British High Commission and the French Embassy in Singapore.
