= Gilles Caron =

- Born: 8 July 1939; Neuilly-sur-Seine, France
- Died: 5 April 1970 (aged 30); Cambodia

Gilles Caron (8 July 1939 – 5 April 1970) was a French photographer and photojournalist.

== Biography ==
Gilles Caron was born in Neuilly-sur-Seine, Hauts-de-Seine, France, of a Scottish mother and a French father, Edouard Caron, an insurance company manager. After the divorce of his parents in 1946, Caron spent 7 years in a boarding school in Argentières, Haute-Savoie. A keen horserider, Gilles Caron briefly embraced a career in horse racing, before moving to Paris where he attended the lycée Jeanson de Sailly. He then moved on to study journalism at the École des Hautes Études Internationales, still in Paris.

He served his National Service in Algeria from 1959 as a paratrooper in the 3rd Marine Infantry Parachute Regiment (3e RPIMa). After nearly 2 years fighting a war he opposed, Caron refused to fight after the Generals' putsch, an aborted coup d'état attempted by 4 former French generals in April 1961. As a result, he spent 2 months in a military prison for insubordination before finishing his military service in 1962.

After returning to Paris Gilles Caron married Marianne, a long-time friend. They had two daughters, Marjolaine (born 9 March 1963) and Clémentine (born 8 December 1967).

In 1964 Gilles Caron started working with Patrice Molinard, a fashion and advertisement photographer. In 1965 he joined the APIS (Agence Parisienne d'Informations Sociales) where he met Raymond Depardon, then working for Dalmas agency. It was during this period that he had his first major success as a photojournalist, with one of his photos illustrating the leading article of France Soir (21 February 1966 issue, on the Ben Barka affair). After leaving the APIS and briefly working for a celebrity photography agency, Caron joined Depardon and the founders of the recently created Gamma agency in 1967.

For the next 3 years Caron covered most of the high-profile conflicts in the world in various countries.

- Israel in June 1967 during the Six-Day War.
- Vietnam in November and December 1967, where he was present during the infamous battle for Hill 875 in Dak To.
- Biafra in April 1968 where he returned twice (in July and November the same year), where he was with his very good friend Don McCullin and where he met Bernard Kouchner, future co-founder of Médecins Sans Frontières.
- France in May 1968 to cover the student upheaval in Paris.
- Mexico in September 1968, when the military and armed men shot student demonstrators in Mexico City days before the opening ceremony of the Olympics.
- Northern Ireland in August 1969 to cover The Troubles.
- Czechoslovakia in August 1969 for the anniversary of the end of the Prague Spring the year before.

In 1970 Gilles Caron went to Cambodia after king Norodom Sihanouk was deposed by Lon Nol on 18 March 1970. On 5 April Gilles Caron disappeared on Route 1, a road between Cambodia and Vietnam controlled by Pol Pot's Khmer Rouge.

== Exhibitions ==
- Gilles Caron, le conflit intérieur, Château de Tours, Tours, France, 21 June - 2 November 2014.

== See also ==
- List of journalists killed and missing in the Vietnam War
