= Larry Burrows =

English photojournalist (1926–1971)

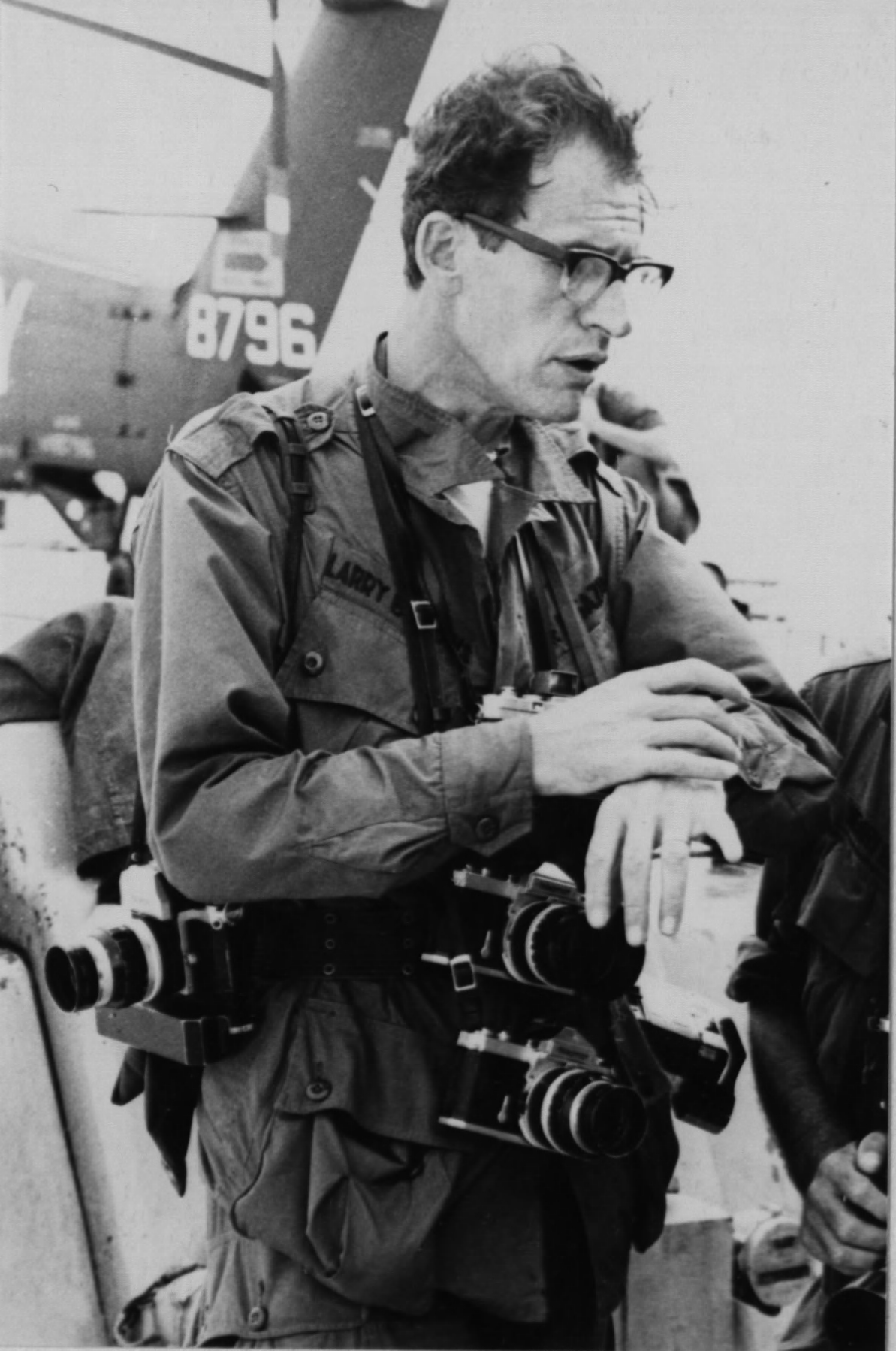
- Burrows in February 1967
- Born: Henry Frank Leslie Burrows; 29 May 1926; London, United Kingdom
- Died: 10 February 1971 (aged 44); Laos
- Occupation: Photojournalist
- Employer: Life Magazine
- Known for: photography

Henry Frank Leslie Burrows (29 May 1926 – 10 February 1971), known as Larry Burrows, was an English photojournalist. He spent 9 years covering the Vietnam War.

== Early career ==
Burrows began his career in the art department of the Daily Express newspaper in 1942 in London. He learned photography and moved to work in the darkrooms of the Keystone photography agency and Life Magazine. It was here that Burrows started to be called Larry to avoid confusion with another Henry working in the same office. It was not unknown for him to redo a whole day of work in order to secure the best result.

Some accounts blame Burrows for melting photographer Robert Capa's D-Day negatives in the drying cabinet, but in fact it was another technician, according to John G. Morris.

== Photojournalism ==
Burrows had an early success with his coverage of the demolition of the Heligoland U-Boat Pens in 1947. Working for the Associated Press, Burrows was a passenger in a De Havilland Dragon Rapide. Officially they were supposed to go no closer than 9 miles (14 km) to the island. However, Burrows persuaded the pilot to fly over at only 500 feet (150 m), knocking out the window perspex when it obscured his shot. For his efforts he was able to take eleven images and earned himself two pages in Life magazine.

Burrows would go on to cover stories in Suez, Lebanon, Cyprus, Central Africa, and Vietnam.

He was described in The Times as an "equipment man" and quoted as saying, "When I take the lot with me there are twenty-six cases".

In early 1971, Burrows was elected a fellow of the Royal Photographic Society.

=== Vietnam ===
Burrows went on to become a photographer and covered the war in Vietnam from 1962 until his death in 1971.

One of Burrows' most famous images was published first in a Life magazine article on 16 April 1965 named One Ride with Yankee Papa 13, about a mission on 31 March 1965.

Flying in a helicopter with the US Marines' Medium Helicopter Squadron 163, Burrows captured the death of Yankee Papa 3 co-pilot Lieutenant James Magel. At the landing zone Magel was assisted to Yankee Papa 13, where airborne door gunner Lance C. Farley gave first aid. It was to no avail and Burrows captured Farley's distress at the loss of his comrade.

Of the photograph Burrows said:

It's not easy to photograph a man dying in the arms of a fellow countryman... Was I simply capitalizing on the other men's grief? I concluded that what I was doing would penetrate the hearts of those at home who are simply too indifferent.

— Larry Burrows

Reaching Out was another famous image. It features US Marine Gunnery Sgt. Jeremiah Purdie, who while wounded, is seen reaching out to wounded Lance Corporal Roger Dale Treadway.

Life.com editor Ben Cosgrove said of the photograph:

Larry Burrows made a photograph that, for generations, has served as the most indelible, searing illustration of the horrors inherent in that long, divisive war — and, by implication, in all wars.

— Ben Cosgrove

Reaching Out was taken on 5 October 1966 after the Marines were ambushed on Mutter's Ridge. However, the image was not featured in Life until February 1971, following Burrows' death.

== Death ==
Burrows died on 10 February 1971 with fellow photojournalists Henri Huet (Associated Press), Kent Potter (United Press International) and Keisaburo Shimamoto (freelancer with Newsweek), when their helicopter was shot down over the Ho Chi Minh Trail in Laos as the group covered Operation Lam Son 719.

Following his death the Managing Editor of Life, Ralph Graves, said of Burrows:

I do not think it is demeaning to any other photographer in the world for me to say that Larry Burrows was the single bravest and most dedicated war photographer I know of.

— Ralph Graves

Of his work, Burrows himself said, "I cannot afford the luxury of thinking about what could happen to me".

In 1985, the Laurence Miller Gallery in New York published a portfolio of Burrows' prints, with the assistance of his son Russell Burrows. In 2002, Burrows' posthumous book Vietnam was awarded the Prix Nadar award.

In 2008 the remains of Burrows and fellow photographers Huet, Potter and Shimamoto were honoured and interred at the Newseum in Washington, D.C.

Journalist David Halberstam paid tribute to Burrows in the 1997 book Requiem: By the Photographers Who Died in Vietnam and Indochina:

I must mention Larry Burrows in particular. To us younger men who had not yet earned reputations, he was a sainted figure. He was a truly beautiful man, modest, graceful, a star who never behaved like one. He was generous to all, a man who gave lessons to his colleagues not just on how to take photographs but, more important, on how to behave like a human being, how to be both colleague and mentor. Our experience of the star system in photography was, until we met him, not necessarily a happy one; all too often talent and ego seemed to come together in equal amounts. We were touched by Larry: How could someone so talented be so graceful?

— David Halberstam, Requiem: By the Photographers Who Died in Vietnam and Indochina

In December 2019, the Newseum was closed due to financial difficulties and the remains of Burrows, Huet, Potter and Shimamoto were disinterred. Their remains are currently stored at the Defense POW/MIA Accounting Agency lab at Offutt Air Force Base awaiting a permanent burial place.

In 2021, Burrows was posthumously inducted into the International Photography Hall of Fame and Museum.

== See also ==
- List of journalists killed and missing in the Vietnam War
