= Charles Eggleston =

American journalist

Charles Richard Eggleston (November 1945 – May 6, 1968) was a photographer with United Press International who was killed in combat in Vietnam where he was covering the ongoing war.

== Early life ==
A graduate of Indian River Central High School in Philadelphia, New York, Eggleston moved to Gouverneur after he graduated from Auburn Community College, and enlisted in the US Navy where he became a journalist.

== Career ==
He was twice awarded as a Navy journalist. In 1966, he asked to be discharged, and became a UPI photographer in the country instead. Sometime before April 1968, he was wounded during a mortar attack against Camp Eagle where he was stationed with the 101st Airborne.

== Tet Offensive ==
In May 1968, a jeep carrying five journalists accidentally came across Viet Cong massing outside Saigon during the Tet Offensive. Despite the journalists' attempts to dissuade the startled Viet Cong soldiers, four out of the five were shot and killed. Twenty-three-year-old Eggleston swore vengeance, and announced his intention to kill as many Viet Cong as possible.

It remains disputed whether he was participating in the May 6th firefight on the Western outskirts of Saigon, or simply photographing it, when he was killed by a bullet to the skull. Most sources agree that he was at least carrying a rifle, if not actually using it. He was the 17th journalist killed in the war. His will had indicated that his possessions were to be given to war orphans.

On May 17, Time reported his death, stating that he had been photographing South Vietnamese paratroopers in a house-to-house search, at the time of the firefight. Other sources indicate that reporter Roger Norum was tape recording a conversation with him during the streetfight, and saw Eggleston shot by a sniper while lighting a cigarette.

== Awards ==
While serving in Vietnam, he was awarded two bronze stars, two Navy commendation medals and South Vietnam's Honor Medal.

== See also ==
- List of journalists killed and missing in the Vietnam War
