= Henri Huet =

French war photographer (1927–1971)

- Henri Huet
- Born: Henri Huet; April 4, 1927; Da Lat, French Indochina
- Died: February 10, 1971 (aged 43); Savannakhet Province, Laos
- Occupation: Combat photographer

Henri Huet (4 April 1927 – 10 February 1971) was a French war photographer, noted for his work covering the Vietnam War for the Associated Press (AP).

== Early life ==
Henri Huet was born in Da Lat, French Indochina, the son of a Breton engineer and Vietnamese mother. At age five he was sent to France, where he was educated at Saint-Malo in Brittany and studied at the art school in Rennes, beginning his adult career as a painter. Huet later joined the French Navy and received training in photography, returning to French Indochina in 1949 as a combat photographer in the First Indochina War. After discharge from the navy when the war ended in 1954, Huet remained in South Vietnam as a civilian photographer working for the French and U.S. governments. While employed by the United States Operation Mission (USOM) photo lab (1955–1960), he enjoyed the mentorship of lab director, Charles E. (Gene) Thomas, who himself had been a combat photographer in World War II. Several of Huet's photos reflect the influence of Thomas's work. He went on to work for United Press International (UPI), later transferring to the Associated Press (AP) in 1965, covering the Vietnam War.

== Photographic career ==
Huet's photographs of the war were influential in moulding American public opinion. One of his most memorable series of photographs featured Pfc Thomas Cole, a young medic of the 1st Cavalry Division, tending fellow soldiers despite his own wounds. The series of twelve photographs was published in the 11 February 1966 edition of Life magazine, with one of the haunting images featuring on the cover. In 1967 the Overseas Press Club awarded Huet the Robert Capa Gold Medal for the "best published photographic reporting from abroad, requiring exceptional courage and enterprise".

== Death ==
On February 10, 1971, during South Vietnam's invasion of southern Laos, known as Operation Lam Son 719, Huet and three other photojournalists joined the operation commander, Lt Gen Hoàng Xuân Lãm, on a helicopter inspection tour of the battlefront. The pilots of the Republic of Vietnam Air Force UH-1 Huey carrying the photojournalists lost their way and flew into the most heavily defended area of the Ho Chi Minh trail, where Huet's chopper and a second one were shot down by hidden North Vietnamese 37mm anti-aircraft guns, killing all eleven on the photographers' aircraft and four on the other. Huet was 43.

Huet's fellow photographers were Larry Burrows of Life magazine, Kent Potter of UPI, and Keizaburo Shimamoto of Newsweek. The crash site was rediscovered in 1996 and, two years later, a second search team from the Joint Task Force Full Accounting (JTFFA), the Pentagon unit responsible for recovering MIA remains in Indochina and elsewhere, excavated the mountainside. They discovered aircraft parts, camera pieces, 35mm film, along with traces of human remains, which proved too scant for laboratory identification.

In late 2002, the search unit, renamed the Joint POW/MIA Accounting Command (JPAC), declared the case closed on grounds of circumstantial group identification. After bureaucratic complications blocked efforts to bury the group remains on official ground, the Newseum in Washington, D.C. agreed to accept them and arranged in 2006 for their acquisition from JPAC. The ceremony on April 3, 2008, which preceded the Newseum's own official opening by a week, was attended by more than 100 guests including relatives of Huet, Burrows and Potter, and many former Vietnam War colleagues.

Speakers included Richard Pyle, Saigon bureau chief of the AP at the time of the crash, and Horst Faas, former AP Saigon photo chief. Pyle and Faas were co-authors of Lost Over Laos: A True Story of Tragedy, Mystery, and Friendship, published by Da Capo Press in 2003 and re-released in paperback in 2004, which recounts the personal stories of the four photographers, the events leading to their deaths, and how Pyle helped the JTFFA locate the crash site. Speakers in addition to Pyle and Faas included Newseum president Peter Prichard and AP president Tom Curley, and Burrows' son Russell spoke for the families.

A second book about Huet, titled Henri Huet: J'etais photographe de guerre au Vietnam, was published in Paris in 2006, authored by Helene Gedouin, a senior editor at Hachette Livre publishers of Paris, and Faas, with contributions from Pyle and other former Vietnam colleagues. The story of the shootdown also was told in Requiem, by the Photographers who died in Vietnam and Indochina, edited by Faas and Tim Page, and published by Random House, New York, in 1997.

Among his colleagues covering the war, Huet was respected for his dedication, bravery and skill in the field, and known for his sense of humor and kindness. Dirck Halstead, the Photo Chief of United Press International in 1965, remarked that he "always had a smile on his face".

== See also ==
- List of journalists killed and missing in the Vietnam War
