= Tay Kay Chin =

Singapore-based photographer (born 1965)

Tay Kay Chin (born July 8, 1965) is a Singapore-based photographer.

== Education ==
Tay studied photojournalism at the University of Missouri.

== Career ==
Tayspent the early part of his professional career at The Straits Times, where he held positions from photographer to picture editor. After leavingThe Straits Times, he worked as Presentation Editor of The Sun newspaper in Bremerton, Washington, United States where his frontpage design for the September 11 attacks was selected by Poynter Institute as one of the 10 best designs in the world, along with journalism giants like The New York Times.

Tay is a regular speaker and judge at regional photography events. He has exhibited widely and his photographs are collected by Singapore's Ministry of Foreign Affairs, the European House of Photography in Paris and private collectors.

A vocal advocate of photography in Singapore, he founded Southeast Asia's first photography workshop, Shooting Home with Objectifs; coordinated the exchange program for Sunderland-based International Photography Research Network; and curated Out of Focus, a series of exhibitions for Month of Photography Singapore 2006. He also wrote the introduction essay for Henri Cartier-Bresson's Early Works exhibition, which was shown in Singapore in June 2006. His other curatorial experience includes being picture editor for the Singapore History Museum SARS exhibition, as well as being director of photography for Mercy Relief's Glimpses of Light exhibition series.

Since 2003, he has been a regular member of the selection committee for the National Arts Council Singapore's (NAC) Cultural Medallion and Young Artist awards, the highest accolades for the arts in Singapore. He is also a member of the Resource Panel for Photography for NAC. In 2003, he was one of 12 Hasselblad Masters in the world, and since 2004, he has been an Epson Stylus Professional. His clients include Saveur Magazine, Time Asia, Newsweek, Hasselblad, Searay Living Magazine, South China Morning Post Magazine, Brutus Magazine, Asahi Weekly, Austrian Airlines, United Overseas Bank, MTV Asia, Singapore Tourism Board, WingTai, Land Transport Authority of Singapore, Singapore Youth Flying Club, Biopolis Singapore, Asia Business and Singapore Technologies. He is currently working on several personal photography projects, at the same time taking on selected commercial commissions.

In both 2005 and 2015, Chin carried out an "August 9 Babies" project, to celebrate Singapore's independence day, with one person from each year (40 and 50, respectively).

== Works ==
- 2001 September 11 cover for The Sun selected as one of 10 best designs by Poynter Institute
- 2002 Master speaker & exhibitor, Month of Photography Asia, Singapore
- 2002 Exhibitor, Chobi Mela
- 2003 Named Hasselblad Master, one of 12 in the world
- 2003 Founded Shooting Home Workshop with Objectifs
- 2003 Solo exhibitions - Panoramic Singapore - Objectifs & Esplanade Tunnel, Singapore
- 2003 Solo exhibition - Panoramic World -Kinokuniya Sydney
- 2003 Speaker, Clickart Singapore
- 2003 Selector, Cultural Medallion & Young Artist award panel, National Arts Council Singapore
- 2004 Picture editor, 38 degree, Remembering SARS exhibition, Singapore History Museum
- 2004 Olympus Visionary 2004 Epson Stylus Pro
- 2004 Exhibitor, Chobi Mela
- 2005 Director of photography & curator, Glimpses of Light exhibitions on Asian tsunami
- 2005 Invited contributor, World Press Photo 50th anniversary book - Things As They Are
- 2005 Completed personal project - National Day Babies - 40 people born on August 9
- 2005 Invited photographer Vision Beijing
- 2006 Co-ordinator, International Photography Research Network Singapore- UK Residency
- 2006 Solo exhibition - Unphotographable -Esplanade Tunnel, Singapore
- 2006 Co-founded Kay Ngee Tan Architects Gallery
- 2006 Published Panoramic Singapore
