= Tim Page (photographer) =

British photographer (1944–2022)

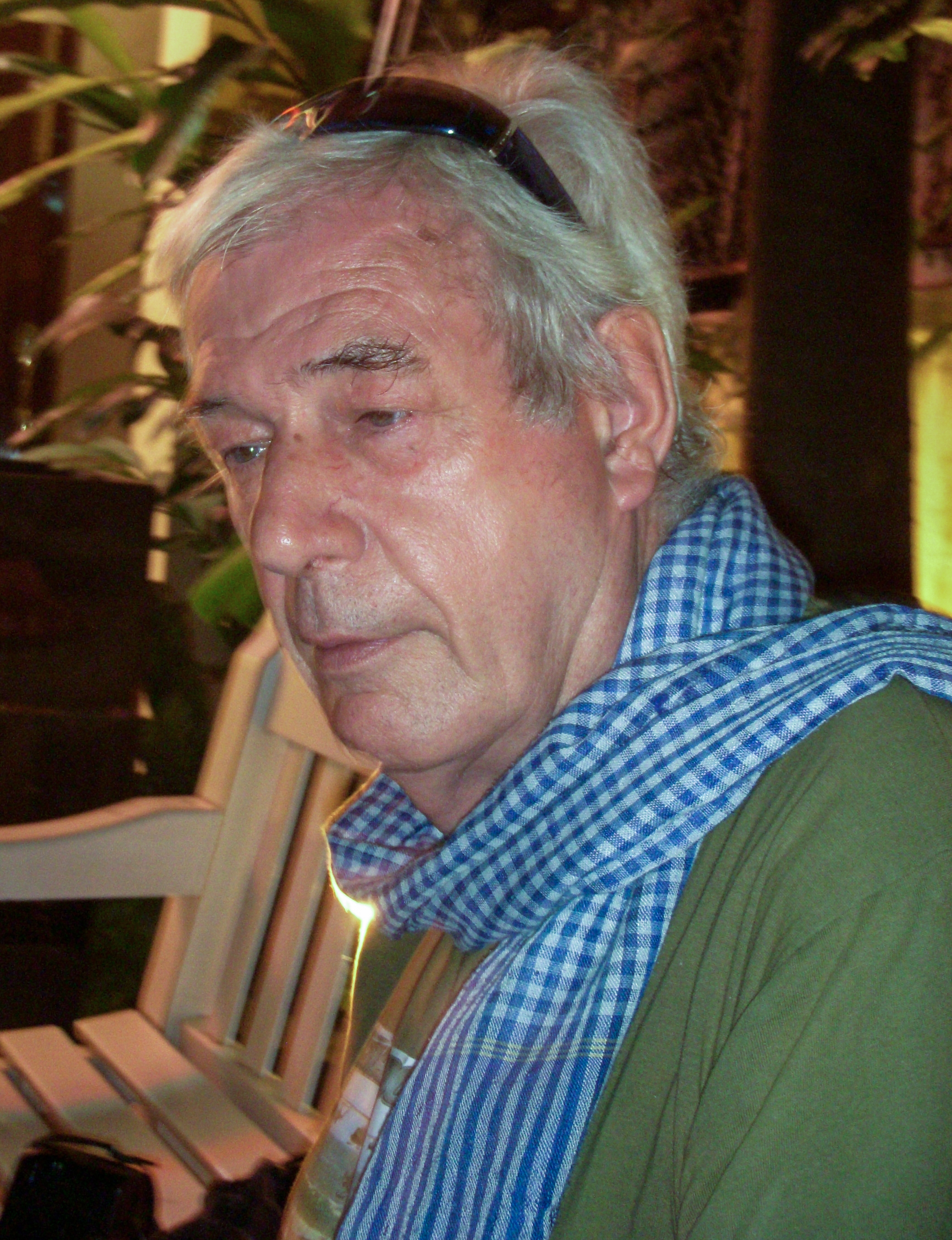
- Page at a 2009 exhibition in Phnom Penh, Cambodia
- Born: John Spencer Russell; 25 May 1944; Tunbridge Wells, England
- Died: 24 August 2022 (aged 78); Bellingen, New South Wales, Australia
- Occupations: Photographer, writer, war correspondent
- Notable work: Requiem (1997)

Timothy John Page (25 May 1944 – 24 August 2022) was a British photographer. He was noted for the photos he took of the Vietnam War, and was later based in Brisbane, Australia.

== Early life ==
Page was born John Spencer Russell in Tunbridge Wells, Kent, on 25 May 1944. He did not know his birth mother; his biological father was killed in a torpedo attack in the Arctic while serving in the Royal Navy during World War II and Page was put up for adoption after he was born. His adoptive father worked as an accountant; his adoptive mother was a housewife. Page was raised in Orpington, and left England in 1962 to make his way overland driving through Europe, Pakistan, India, Burma, Thailand and Laos. Without money in Laos, he found work as an agricultural advisor for USAID.

== Career ==
Page began work as a press photographer in Laos stringing for UPI and AFP, having taught himself photography. His exclusive photographs of an attempted coup d'état in Laos in 1965 for UPI got him a staff position in the Saigon bureau of the news agency. He is celebrated for his work as a freelance accredited press photographer in Vietnam and Cambodia during the 1960s, also finding time to cover the Six-Day War in the Middle East in 1967. Due to a near-death experience in the early 1960s, he came to view his life as "free time". This led him to take photographs in dangerous situations where other journalists would not venture. Similarly, Page was captivated by the excitement and glamour of warfare, which helped contribute to the style of photographs he is acclaimed for.

By late 1965 Page was sharing a house at 47 Bui Thi Xuan, Saigon, with Leonardo Caparros and fellow correspondents Simon Dring, Martin Stuart-Fox and Steve Northup, known as "Frankie's House" after the resident Vietnamese houseboy. Frankie's House became a social club for a group of correspondents between field assignments and their friends who smoked marijuana there. Page did not shy away from the drug culture he was involved in during his time in Vietnam, devoting a large amount of his book Page after Page to it. In Dispatches, Michael Herr wrote of Page as the most "extravagant" of the "wigged-out crazies running around Vietnam", due in most respects to the amount of drugs that he enjoyed taking. His unusual personality was part of the inspiration for the character of the journalist played by Dennis Hopper in Apocalypse Now.

In 1965, shortly after Page got his first publication in Life magazine, Beryl Fox was filming The Mills of the Gods: Vietnam for the CBC series Document. During three weeks of filming, Page was hired to shoot some of the documentary. At a time when the anti-war movement was in its infancy, the film helped to open conversations around the world. In 1966, the film won the George Polk Award for Best Television Documentary and the Canadian Film Award for Film of the Year.

Page was injured in action four times. The first, in September 1965, was in Chu Lai where he was struck by shrapnel in the legs and stomach; the second was in Da Nang during the 1966 Buddhist riots, where he received more shrapnel wounds to the head, back, and arms; the third in August 1966 happened in the South China sea, where he was on board the Coast Guard cutter Point Welcome, when it was mistaken for a Viet Cong ship, and U.S. Air Force pilots strafed the vessel, leaving Page adrift at sea with over two hundred wounds. Lastly, in April 1969, Page jumped out of a helicopter to help load wounded soldiers. At the same time, a sergeant stepped on a mine close by, sending a 2-inch piece of shrapnel into Page's head. This list of injuries led his colleagues in the field to joke that he would never make it to 23 years of age. He spent the next year in the United States undergoing extensive neuro-surgery. During recovery he became closely involved with the Vietnam Veterans Against the War and worked as a caregiver for amputees, traumatically shocked and stressed young men. One of these was Ron Kovic. Richard Boyle was also friends with Kovic and Page at this time.

On 9 December 1967, Page was arrested in New Haven, Connecticut, along with fellow journalists Mike Zwerin and Yvonne Chabrier at the infamous Doors concert where Jim Morrison was arrested onstage. Charges against all four were dropped due to lack of evidence.

Page had a part in the Papers on a war, which became the Pentagon Papers, released by Daniel Ellsberg who had stayed at Frankie's House. Ellsberg gave Page a copy inscribed "To Tim who may well have changed the course of the war".

In the 1970s Page worked as a freelance photographer for music magazines such as Crawdaddy and Rolling Stone. In January 1973 Page spent time with Bill Cardoso and Hunter S. Thompson, who was covering Super Bowl VII. Page photographed Thompson riding a Black Shadow Motorbike, but Rolling Stone lost the negatives. Rolling Stone wanted Page to go back to Vietnam with Thompson in 1975 but Thompson said Page was too crazy. During Page's recovery in the spring of 1970 he learnt of the capture of his best friend, roommate and fellow photo-journalist Sean Flynn in Cambodia. Throughout the 1970s and 80s he tried to discover Flynn's fate and final resting place and wanted to erect a memorial to all those in the media who either were killed or went missing in the war. This led him to found the Indochina Media Memorial Foundation and was the genesis for the book Requiem, co-edited with fellow Vietnam War photographer Horst Faas. Requiem won the George Polk Book Award and the Robert Capa Gold Medal in 1997. Page's quest to clear up the mystery of Flynn's fate continued into his later years.

Page's book Requiem contains photographs taken by all of the photographers and journalists killed during the Vietnamese wars against the Japanese, French and Americans. Requiem has become since early 2000 a travelling photographic exhibition placed under the custody of the George Eastman House International Museum of Photography and Film. The exhibition has been presented in Vietnam's War Remnants Museum in Ho Chi Minh City, as well as in New York City, Chicago, Atlanta, Washington, D.C., Tokyo, Hanoi, Lausanne, and London. In 2011, it was selected to be the main exhibition of the Month of Photography Asia in Singapore.

Page also covered wars in Israel, Bosnia and Afghanistan. As a peace activist he was patron of organisations such as Mine Action Group and Soldier On, a veterans' support group in Australia. He was keen to "highlight the folly of war", stating that "the only good war photograph is an anti-war photograph".

== Later years ==
Page was the subject of many documentaries and two films, and the author of many books. He lived in Brisbane, Australia, having retired from covering wars. He was an adjunct professor of photojournalism at Griffith University.

I had died. I lived. I had seen the tunnel. It was black. It was nothing. There was no light at the end. There was no afterlife. Nothing religious about any of it. And it did not seem scary. It was a long, flowing, no-colour wave which just disappeared. The mystery was partly resolved, all the fearful church propaganda took on its true, shameful meaning. I was content. I was alive. I was not dead, and it seemed very clear, very free. This was the dawning, the overture to losing a responsible part of my psyche. A liberation happened at that intersection. Anything from here on would be free time, a gift from the gods.

— concerning his near-death experience following a 1960 motorcycle accident

During the 2010–2011 Queensland floods, Page's archives in his basement were damaged, highlighting at the time the need for a longer-term home for what he estimated were three-quarters of a million images accumulated over his 45-year career.

The Australian War Memorial holds a collection of Page's photography.

== Personal life ==
Page's three marriages ended in divorce. He had one child, Kit, from his relationship with Clare Clifford.

Page died on 24 August 2022 at his home in Bellingen, New South Wales. He was 78, and had liver cancer prior to his death.

== Publications ==
- Tim Page's Nam (1983) ISBN 978-0-394-53005-5
- Sri Lanka (1984) ISBN 978-0-500-24120-2
- Ten Years After: Vietnam Today (1987) ISBN 978-0-394-56464-7
- Page after Page: Memoirs of a War-Torn Photographer (1988)
- Derailed in Uncle Ho's Victory Garden (1995) ISBN 978-0-684-81667-8
- Nam, the Vietnam Experience, 1965-75 (1995) ISBN 9781566199490
- Mid Term Report (1995) ISBN 978-0-500-27795-9
- Requiem (1997) ISBN 978-0-679-45657-5
- The Mindful Moment (2001) ISBN 978-0-500-54242-2
- Another Vietnam (2002) ISBN 978-0-7922-6465-1

== Films about Page ==
- Danger on the Edge of Town (1991) – a film on Page's search to discover the fate of his friends Sean Flynn and Dana Stone who disappeared in Cambodia in 1970
- Frankie's House – a 1992 British/Australian miniseries, portrayed by Iain Glen
- Vietnam's Unseen War (Pictures from the Other Side)
- Mentioned in Dispatches (BBC Arena, 1979)

The Final Page. A Clapper Sticks Production by Sarah George.
